= 2026–27 Atlético Madrid season =

Atlético Madrid
2026–27 season
- President: Enrique Cerezo
- Head coach: Diego Simeone
- Stadium: Riyadh Air Metropolitano
- La Liga: 2nd
- Copa del Rey: Round of 32
- Supercopa de España: Semi-finals
- UEFA Champions League: League phase
- Top goalscorer: League: Álex Baena (6); All: Álex Baena (6)
- Biggest win: 4–0 vs Osasuna (H)
- Biggest defeat: 0–3 vs Athletic Bilbao (A)
Home colours	Away colours	Third colours

The 2026–27 season is the 124th season in the history of Atlético Madrid, and the club's 25th consecutive season in La Liga. In addition to the domestic league, the club is participating in the Copa del Rey, the Supercopa de España and the UEFA Champions League.

This is the first season since 2020–21 without Antoine Griezmann, who departed the club to join Major League Soccer side Orlando City.

== Kits ==
Home	Away

== Players ==
As of 3 September 2026

Note: Flags indicate national team as defined under FIFA eligibility rules; some limited exceptions apply. Players may hold more than one non-FIFA nationality.

No.	Pos.	Nation	Player
1	GK	ARG	Juan Musso
3	MF	MEX	Obed Vargas
4	MF	ESP	Rodri Mendoza
5	MF	USA	Johnny Cardoso
6	MF	ESP	Koke (captain)
7	MF	KOR	Lee Kang-in
8	MF	ESP	Pablo Barrios (4th captain)
9	FW	NOR	Alexander Sørloth
10	MF	ESP	Álex Baena
11	FW	NGR	Ademola Lookman
13	GK	SLO	Jan Oblak (vice-captain)
14	MF	ESP	Marcos Llorente (3rd captain)
15	FW	CAN	Jonathan David (on loan from Juventus)

No.	Pos.	Nation	Player
16	MF	ESP	Arnau Ortiz
17	DF	SVK	Dávid Hancko
18	DF	ESP	Marc Pubill
19	FW	ARG	Julián Alvarez
20	MF	ARG	Giuliano Simeone
21	DF	ARG	Cristian Romero
22	DF	ESP	Álex Grimaldo
23	MF	DEN	Morten Hjulmand
24	DF	ESP	Robin Le Normand
25	GK	ESP	Salvi Esquivel
27	DF	ESP	Jorge Domínguez
30	DF	ESP	Dani Martínez

== Transfers ==
=== In ===
Date	Pos.	Age	Player	From	Type	Fee	Ref.
30 June 2026	GK	28	(Romania) Horațiu Moldovan	Oviedo	Loan return		
30 June 2026	MF	30	(France) Thomas Lemar	Girona	Loan return		
30 June 2026	FW	24	(Spain) Carlos Martín	Rayo Vallecano	Loan return		
30 June 2026	DF	30	(Spain) Álex Grimaldo	(Germany) Bayer Leverkusen	Transfer	€15,000,000	
11 July 2026	MF	27	(Denmark) Morten Hjulmand	(Portugal) Sporting CP	Transfer	€45,000,000	
25 July 2026	MF	25	(South Korea) Lee Kang-in	(France) Paris Saint-Germain	Transfer	€35,000,000	
15 August 2026	DF	28	(Argentina) Cristian Romero	(England) Tottenham Hotspur	Transfer	€35,000,000	
1 September 2026	FW	26	(Canada) Jonathan David	(Italy) Juventus	Loan		

Total expenditure: ▼€130 million (excluding potential add-ons, bonuses, undisclosed figures and future transfers)

=== Out ===
Date	Pos.	Age	Player	To	Type	Fee	Ref.
30 June 2026	FW	35	(France) Antoine Griezmann	(United States) Orlando City	Transfer	Free	
30 June 2026	MF	20	(Spain) Jano Monserrate	(Netherlands) Ajax	Transfer	Free	
30 June 2026	MF	28	(Argentina) Nicolás González	(Italy) Juventus	End of loan		
30 June 2026	DF	31	(France) Clément Lenglet	(Portugal) Benfica	Loan		
14 July 2026	GK	28	(Romania) Horațiu Moldovan	(Turkey) Eyüpspor	Loan		
28 July 2026	DF	21	(Spain) Julio Díaz	Sevilla	Transfer	€1,000,000	
6 August 2026	MF	20	(Spain) Javi Morcillo	Elche	Transfer	€1,500,000	
8 August 2026	MF	25	(Argentina) Thiago Almada	(Argentina) River Plate	Transfer	€20,000,000	
12 August 2026	DF	28	(Argentina) Nahuel Molina	(Italy) Roma	Transfer	€18,000,000	
19 August 2026	DF	24	(Italy) Matteo Ruggeri	(England) Aston Villa	Transfer	€25,000,000	
27 August 2026	DF	21	(Spain) Javier Boñar	Girona	Transfer	€2,000,000	
31 August 2026	MF	21	(Spain) Iker Luque	Racing Santander	Transfer	€1,500,000	
1 September 2026	MF	30	(France) Thomas Lemar	Elche	Loan		
1 September 2026	DF	31	(Uruguay) José Giménez	Deportivo A Coruña	Loan		
2 September 2026	FW	24	(Spain) Carlos Martín	(Croatia) Hajduk Split	Loan		
3 September 2026	FW	21	(Spain) Rayane Belaid	Rayo Vallecano	Transfer	€500,000	

Total expenditure: ▲€69.5 million (excluding potential add-ons, bonuses, undisclosed figures and future transfers)

== Pre-season and friendlies ==
Win Draw Loss Fixtures

29 July 2026 Friendly	Atlético Madrid	4–1	Getafe	Majadahonda, Spain
20:30 WEST (UTC+1)	Lookman 5', 35'; Ortiz 56'; Vargas 89' (pen.)	Report	Kittel 41'; Mady (yellow card) 54'	Stadium: Estadio Cerro del Espino; Attendance: 0 (Fan free ground match); Referee: Álvaro Rodríguez Prieto

1 August 2026 Snapdragon Cup	Manchester United	2–1	Atlético Madrid	Stockholm, Sweden
15:00 WEST (UTC+1)	Heaven (yellow card) 50'; Mbeumo 53' (pen.), 74'	Report	Ortiz 5'	Stadium: Nationalarenan; Attendance: 30,000; Referee: Adam Ladebäck (Sweden)

9 August 2026 2026 coupang play series	Manchester City	3–1	Atlético Madrid	Seoul, South Korea
13:00 WEST (UTC+1)	Marmoush 57', 59'; Gvardiol (yellow card) 89'; Aït-Nouri 90'	Report	Domínguez 43'; Hjulmand (yellow card) 55'	Stadium: Sangam Stadium; Attendance: 50,078; Referee: Kim Jong-hyeok (South Korea)

14 August 2026 Friendly	Marseille	1–2	Atlético Madrid	Marseille, France
17:30 WEST (UTC+1)	Paixão 22', (yellow card) 41'; Balerdi (yellow card) 48'; Kondogbia (yellow card) 62'	Report	Simeone (yellow card) 5'; Le Normand (yellow card) 17'; Mendoza 39'; Martín 78'	Stadium: Stade Vélodrome; Attendance: 45,000; Referee: Aurelien Petit (France)

== Competitions ==
=== Overall record ===
Competition	First match	Last match	Starting round	Final position	Record							
Competition	First match	Last match	Starting round	Final position	Pld	W	D	L	GF	GA	GD	Win %
La Liga	19 August 2026	28–30 May 2027	Matchday 1	TBD	11	9	1	1	22	8	+14	81.82
Copa del Rey	15–17 December 2026	TBD	Round of 32	TBD	0	0	0	0	0	0	+0	—
Supercopa de España	2 February 2027	February 2027	Semi-finals	TBD	0	0	0	0	0	0	+0	—
UEFA Champions League	9 September 2026	TBD	League phase	TBD	4	1	1	2	4	5	−1	25.00
Total					15	10	2	3	26	13	+13	66.67

Last updated: 3 November 2026
Source: Soccerway

=== La Liga ===
==== League table ====
Pos	Team	Pld	W	D	L	GF	GA	GD	Pts	Qualification or relegation
1	Barcelona	13	12	0	1	51	15	+36	36	Qualification for the UEFA Champions League league phase
2	Real Madrid	13	11	0	2	33	11	+22	33	Qualification for the UEFA Champions League league phase
3	Atlético Madrid	13	10	1	2	26	10	+16	31	Qualification for the UEFA Champions League league phase
4	Real Betis	13	8	3	2	21	16	+5	27	Qualification for the UEFA Champions League league phase
5	Real Sociedad	13	7	1	5	23	23	0	22	Qualification for the UEFA Europa League league phase

Updated to match(es) played on 22 November 2026. Source: LaLiga EA Sports
Rules for classification: 1) Points; 2) Head-to-head points; 3) Head-to-head goal difference; 4) Goal difference; 5) Goals scored; 6) Fair-play points (if three or more teams tied); 7) Play-off at neutral site.
(Note: Head-to-head record is used only after all the matches between the teams in question have been played)

==== Results summary ====
Overall								Home						Away					
Pld	W	D	L	GF	GA	GD	Pts	W	D	L	GF	GA	GD	W	D	L	GF	GA	GD
12	9	1	2	23	10	+13	28	4	1	0	12	5	+7	5	0	2	11	5	+6

Last updated: 31 October 2026.
Source: La Liga

==== Results by round ====
Round	1	2	3	4	5	6	7	8	9	10	11	12	13	14	15	16	17	18	19	20	21	22	23	24	25	26	27	28	29	30	31	32	33	34	35	36	37	38
Ground	H	H	A	A	A	H	H	A	A	H	A	H	A	A	H	H	A	A	H	H	A	H	A	A	H	A	H	A	H	A	H	H	A	H	A	H	H	A
Result	W	D	W	L	W	W	W	W	W	W	W	L																										
Position	3	6	3	6	5	4	2	2	2	2	2	3																										

Updated to match(es) played on 8 November 2026. Source: La Liga
A = Away; H = Home; W = Win; D = Draw; L = Loss

==== Matches ====
The match schedule was released on 30 June 2026.

19 August 2026 1	Atlético Madrid	2–0	Málaga	Madrid
21:00 CEST (UTC+2)	Hancko (yellow card) 15'; Domínguez (yellow card) 37'; Lee 70'; Baena 85'	Report	Puga (yellow card) 45+4'; Cruz (yellow card) 80'; Ramón (yellow card) 88'	Stadium: Riyadh Air Metropolitano; Attendance: 65,785; Referee: Adrián Cordero Vega

23 August 2026 2	Atlético Madrid	2–2	Villarreal	Madrid
17:00 CEST (UTC+2)	Baena (yellow card) 54'; Pubill 59'; Le Normand (red card) 76'; Hjulmand (yellow card) 77'; Simeone 85'; Giménez (yellow card) 90+1'	Report	Mouriño (yellow card) 50'; Gerard 66' (pen.); Mikautadze 78' (pen.); Foyth (yellow card) 90+10'	Stadium: Riyadh Air Metropolitano; Attendance: 61,978; Referee: Alejandro Hernández Hernández

29 August 2026 3	Sevilla	1–3	Atlético Madrid	Seville
21:30 CEST (UTC+2)	Sierra 66'; Romero (yellow card) 89'; Suazo (yellow card) 90+1'	Report	Baena 4', 33'; Lookman 26'; Llorente (yellow card) 45+4'; Pubill (yellow card) 90+6'	Stadium: Ramón Sánchez-Pizjuán; Attendance: 38,340; Referee: Javier Alberola Rojas

5 September 2026 4	Athletic Bilbao	3–0	Atlético Madrid	Bilbao
16:15 CEST (UTC+2)	N. Williams 46'; Navarro 48'; Sancet 90'	Report	Lee (yellow card) 39'	Stadium: San Mamés; Attendance: 48,425; Referee: José Luis Munuera Montero

13 September 2026 5	Real Sociedad	0–3	Atlético Madrid	San Sebastián
21:00 CEST (UTC+2)	Herrera (yellow card) 18'; Oyarzabal (yellow card) 78'	Report	Cardoso (yellow card) 75'; Grimaldo 84' (pen.); David 90'; Simeone 90+5'	Stadium: Anoeta; Attendance: 31,834; Referee: Juan Martínez Munuera

16 September 2026 6	Atlético Madrid	4–0	Osasuna	Madrid
19:00 CEST (UTC+2)	David 24'; Lookman (yellow card) 50'; Lee 54'; Le Normand 63'; Baena 82'	Report	Ru. García (yellow card) 86'; Bretones (yellow card) 90+3'	Stadium: Riyadh Air Metropolitano; Attendance: 60,869; Referee: Francisco José Hernández Maeso

20 September 2026 7	Atlético Madrid	2–1	Real Madrid	Madrid
16:15 CEST (UTC+2)	Pubill (yellow card) 35'; Romero (yellow card) 38'; Grimaldo 53' (pen.); David 59'	Report	Dumfries (yellow card) 49'; Huijsen (red card) 52'; Bellingham (yellow card) 78'; Rüdiger 89'	Stadium: Riyadh Air Metropolitano; Attendance: 70,514; Referee: Miguel Ángel Ortiz Arias

10 October 2026 8	Alavés	1–2	Atlético Madrid	Vitoria-Gasteiz
16:15 CEST (UTC+2)	Boyé 45+6' (pen.); Pérez (red card) 61'	Report	Grimaldo 33'; Lookman (yellow card) 45'; Le Normand (yellow card) 45+1'; Romero 87'; Cardoso (yellow card) 90+2'	Stadium: Mendizorrotza; Attendance: 17,741; Referee: Alejandro Quintero González

17 October 2026 9	Espanyol	0–1	Atlético Madrid	Cornellà de Llobregat
14:00 CEST (UTC+2)	Hinojo (yellow card) 81'; Nuñez (yellow card) 87'	Report	Hjulmand (yellow card) 22'; Lee (yellow card) 43'; Romero (yellow card) 66'; Baena (yellow card) 68', (goal) 89'; Mendoza (yellow card) 79'	Stadium: RCDE Stadium; Attendance: 30,882; Referee: Alejandro Hernández Hernández

24 October 2026 10	Atlético Madrid	1–0	Deportivo A Coruña	Madrid
21:00 CEST (UTC+2)	Pubill (yellow card) 26'; Alvarez 48'; Sørloth (yellow card) 85'; Baena (yellow card) 86'; Simeone (yellow card) 87'	Report	Hernández (yellow card) 75'; Quagliata (yellow card) 79'	Stadium: Riyadh Air Metropolitano; Attendance: 68,674; Referee: José María Sánchez Martínez

31 October 2026 11	Levante	0–2	Atlético Madrid	Valencia
14:00 CET (UTC+1)		Report	Grimaldo 36'; Simeone 62'	Stadium: Ciutat de València; Attendance: 20,513; Referee: Ricardo de Burgos Bengoetxea

8 November 2026 12	Atlético Madrid	1–2	Barcelona	Madrid
21:00 CET (UTC+1)	Simeone 10'; Baena (yellow card) 43'; Llorente (yellow card) 87'; Pubill (yellow card) 88'	Report	Fermín 45', 66'; Bernal (yellow card) 74'	Stadium: Riyadh Air Metropolitano; Attendance: 69,788; Referee: Javier Alberola Rojas

22 November 2026 13	Getafe	v	Atlético Madrid	Getafe
21:00 CET (UTC+1)		Report		Stadium: Coliseum

29 November 2026 14	Elche	v	Atlético Madrid	Elche
--:-- CET (UTC+1)		Report		Stadium: Martínez Valero

6 December 2026 15	Atlético Madrid	v	Real Betis	Madrid
--:-- CET (UTC+1)		Report		Stadium: Riyadh Air Metropolitano

13 December 2026 16	Atlético Madrid	v	Valencia	Madrid
--:-- CET (UTC+1)		Report		Stadium: Riyadh Air Metropolitano

20 December 2026 17	Celta Vigo	v	Atlético Madrid	Vigo
--:-- CET (UTC+1)		Report		Stadium: Abanca-Balaídos

3 January 2027 18	Rayo Vallecano	v	Atlético Madrid	Leganés
--:-- CET (UTC+1)		Report		Stadium: Butarque

10 January 2027 19	Atlético Madrid	v	Racing Santander	Madrid
--:-- CET (UTC+1)		Report		Stadium: Riyadh Air Metropolitano

17 January 2027 20	Atlético Madrid	v	Real Sociedad	Madrid
--:-- CET (UTC+1)		Report		Stadium: Riyadh Air Metropolitano

24 January 2026 21	Deportivo A Coruña	v	Atlético Madrid	A Coruña
--:-- CET (UTC+1)		Report		Stadium: ABANCA-Riazor

31 January 2027 22	Atlético Madrid	v	Espanyol	Madrid
--:-- CET (UTC+1)		Report		Stadium: Riyadh Air Metropolitano

7 February 2027 23	Barcelona	v	Atlético Madrid	Barcelona
--:-- CET (UTC+1)		Report		Stadium: Spotify Camp Nou

14 February 2027 24	Osasuna	v	Atlético Madrid	Pamplona
--:-- CET (UTC+1)		Report		Stadium: El Sadar

21 February 2027 25	Atlético Madrid	v	Elche	Madrid
--:-- CET (UTC+1)		Report		Stadium: Riyadh Air Metropolitano

28 February 2027 26	Málaga	v	Atlético Madrid	Málaga
--:-- CET (UTC+1)		Report		Stadium: La Rosaleda

7 March 2027 27	Atlético Madrid	v	Celta Vigo	Madrid
--:-- CET (UTC+1)		Report		Stadium: Riyadh Air Metropolitano

14 March 2027 28	Racing Santander	v	Atlético Madrid	Santander
--:-- CET (UTC+1)		Report		Stadium: El Sardinero

21 March 2027 29	Atlético Madrid	v	Getafe	Madrid
--:-- CET (UTC+1)		Report		Stadium: Riyadh Air Metropolitano

4 April 2027 30	Real Madrid	v	Atlético Madrid	Madrid
--:-- CEST (UTC+2)		Report		Stadium: Bernabéu

11 April 2027 31	Atlético Madrid	v	Levante	Madrid
--:-- CEST (UTC+2)		Report		Stadium: Riyadh Air Metropolitano

18 April 2027 32	Atlético Madrid	v	Sevilla	Madrid
--:-- CEST (UTC+2)		Report		Stadium: Riyadh Air Metropolitano

21 April 2027 33	Villarreal	v	Atlético Madrid	Villarreal
--:-- CEST (UTC+2)		Report		Stadium: Estadio de la Cerámica

2 May 2027 34	Atlético Madrid	v	Alavés	Madrid
--:-- CEST (UTC+2)		Report		Stadium: Riyadh Air Metropolitano

9 May 2027 35	Valencia	v	Atlético Madrid	Valencia
--:-- CEST (UTC+2)		Report		Stadium: Mestalla

16 May 2027 36	Atlético Madrid	v	Rayo Vallecano	Madrid
--:-- CEST (UTC+2)		Report		Stadium: Riyadh Air Metropolitano

23 May 2027 37	Atlético Madrid	v	Athletic Bilbao	Madrid
--:-- CEST (UTC+2)		Report		Stadium: Riyadh Air Metropolitano

30 May 2027 38	Real Betis	v	Atlético Madrid	Seville
--:-- CEST (UTC+2)		Report		Stadium: La Cartuja

=== Copa del Rey ===
Atlético entered the tournament in the round of 32, as they qualified for the 2027 Supercopa de España.

=== Supercopa de España ===
2 February 2027 Semi-finals	Barcelona	v	Atlético Madrid	Istanbul, Turkey
22:00 TRT (UTC+3)				Stadium: Şükrü Saracoğlu Stadium

=== UEFA Champions League ===
==== League phase ====
The league phase draw was held on 27 August 2026.

Pos	Team	Pld	W	D	L	GF	GA	GD	Pts	Qualification
21	(Ukraine) Shakhtar Donetsk	4	1	1	2	4	4	0	4	Advance to knockout phase play-offs (unseeded)
22	(Norway) Viking	4	1	1	2	9	10	−1	4	Advance to knockout phase play-offs (unseeded)
23	(Spain) Atlético Madrid	4	1	1	2	4	5	−1	4	Advance to knockout phase play-offs (unseeded)
24	(Netherlands) PSV Eindhoven	4	1	1	2	3	4	−1	4	Advance to knockout phase play-offs (unseeded)
25	(Norway) Bodø/Glimt	4	1	1	2	4	9	−5	4	

Updated to match(es) played on 4 November 2026. Source: UEFA
Rules for classification: League phase tiebreakers

Round	1	2	3	4	5	6	7	8
Ground	A	H	A	H	H	A	A	H
Result	L	W	D	L				
Position	25	15	16	23				

Updated to match(es) played on 3 November 2026. Source: UEFA
A = Away; H = Home; W = Win; D = Draw; L = Loss

9 September 2026 1	Liverpool (England)	2–1	(Spain) Atlético Madrid	Liverpool, England
20:00 BST (UTC+1)	Mac Allister (yellow card) 28', (goal) 50'; Szoboszlai 40'	Report	Llorente 17'; Pubill (yellow card) 52'	Stadium: Anfield; Attendance: 59,870; Referee: Davide Massa (Italy)

13 October 2026 2	Atlético Madrid (Spain)	2–0	(England) Manchester United	Madrid, Spain
21:00 CEST (UTC+2)	Barrios 1'; Lookman 79'; Le Normand (yellow card) 88'	Report	Rashford (yellow card) 52'; Yoro (red card) 74'	Stadium: Riyadh Air Metropolitano; Attendance: 69,493; Referee: Glenn Nyberg (Sweden)

20 October 2026 3	VfB Stuttgart (Germany)	1–1	(Spain) Atlético Madrid	Stuttgart, Germany
21:00 CEST (UTC+2)	Mittelstädt (yellow card) 17'; Leweling 36'	Report	Alvarez 47'; Hjulmand (red card) 64'	Stadium: MHPArena; Attendance: 58,000; Referee: Serdar Gözübüyük (Netherlands)

3 November 2026 4	Atlético Madrid (Spain)	0–2	(Germany) Bayern Munich	Madrid, Spain
21:00 CET (UTC+1)	Simeone (yellow card) 79'	Report	Karl 54'; Kimmich (yellow card) 57'; Laimer 74'; Stanišić (yellow card) 90+1'	Stadium: Riyadh Air Metropolitano; Attendance: 69,821; Referee: François Letexier (France)

25 November 2026 5	Atlético Madrid (Spain)	v	(Norway) Viking	Madrid, Spain
21:00 CET (UTC+1)		Report		Stadium: Riyadh Air Metropolitano

9 December 2026 6	PSV Eindhoven (Netherlands)	v	(Spain) Atlético Madrid	Eindhoven, Netherlands
21:00 CET (UTC+1)		Report		Stadium: Philips Stadion

19 January 2027 7	Bodø/Glimt (Norway)	v	(Spain) Atlético Madrid	Bodø, Norway
18:45 CET (UTC+1)		Report		Stadium: Aspmyra Stadion

27 January 2027 8	Atlético Madrid (Spain)	v	(Turkey) Fenerbahçe	Madrid, Spain
21:00 CET (UTC+1)		Report		Stadium: Riyadh Air Metropolitano

== Statistics ==
=== Squad statistics ===
No.	Pos	Nat	Player	Total		La Liga		Copa del Rey		Supercopa de España		Champions League	
No.	Pos	Nat	Player	Apps	Goals	Apps	Goals	Apps	Goals	Apps	Goals	Apps	Goals
Goalkeepers
1	GK	(Argentina) ARG	Juan Musso	0	0	0	0	0	0	0	0	0	0
13	GK	(Slovenia) SLO	Jan Oblak	17	0	13	0	0	0	0	0	4	0
25	GK	(Spain) ESP	Salvi Esquivel	0	0	0	0	0	0	0	0	0	0
Defenders
17	DF	(Slovakia) SVK	Dávid Hancko	17	0	11+2	0	0	0	0	0	4	0
18	DF	(Spain) ESP	Marc Pubill	14	1	9+1	1	0	0	0	0	3+1	0
21	DF	(Argentina) ARG	Cristian Romero	8	1	5+1	1	0	0	0	0	2	0
22	DF	(Spain) ESP	Álex Grimaldo	16	5	11+1	5	0	0	0	0	3+1	0
24	DF	(Spain) ESP	Robin Le Normand	12	1	5+3	1	0	0	0	0	1+3	0
27	DF	(Spain) ESP	Jorge Domínguez	1	0	1	0	0	0	0	0	0	0
30	DF	(Spain) ESP	Dani Martínez	2	0	2	0	0	0	0	0	0	0
Midfielders
3	MF	(Mexico) MEX	Obed Vargas	1	0	0	0	0	0	0	0	0+1	0
4	MF	(Spain) ESP	Rodri Mendoza	7	0	2+4	0	0	0	0	0	0+1	0
5	MF	(United States) USA	Johnny Cardoso	10	1	4+4	1	0	0	0	0	1+1	0
6	MF	(Spain) ESP	Koke	12	0	6+4	0	0	0	0	0	1+1	0
7	MF	(South Korea) KOR	Lee Kang-in	16	2	10+3	2	0	0	0	0	2+1	0
8	MF	(Spain) ESP	Pablo Barrios	14	1	9+1	0	0	0	0	0	4	1
10	MF	(Spain) ESP	Álex Baena	17	6	9+4	6	0	0	0	0	4	0
14	MF	(Spain) ESP	Marcos Llorente	17	1	10+3	0	0	0	0	0	4	1
16	MF	(Spain) ESP	Arnau Ortiz	5	0	1+4	0	0	0	0	0	0	0
20	MF	(Argentina) ARG	Giuliano Simeone	17	4	10+3	4	0	0	0	0	4	0
23	MF	(Denmark) DEN	Morten Hjulmand	14	0	7+4	0	0	0	0	0	1+2	0
Forwards
9	FW	(Norway) NOR	Alexander Sørloth	8	0	0+5	0	0	0	0	0	2+1	0
11	FW	(Nigeria) NGR	Ademola Lookman	15	2	9+2	1	0	0	0	0	0+4	1
15	FW	(Canada) CAN	Jonathan David	11	3	4+3	3	0	0	0	0	1+3	0
19	FW	(Argentina) ARG	Julián Alvarez	13	2	4+5	1	0	0	0	0	4	1
Players transferred/loaned out during the season
2	DF	(Uruguay) URU	José Giménez	2	0	0+2	0	0	0	0	0	0	0
12	FW	(Spain) ESP	Carlos Martín	1	0	1	0	0	0	0	0	0	0
15	MF	(France) FRA	Thomas Lemar	0	0	0	0	0	0	0	0	0	0

Last updated: 22 November 2026
Source: FBREF

=== Goalscorers ===
Rank	No.	Pos.	Nat.	Player	La Liga	Copa del Rey	Supercopa de España	Champions League	Total
1	10	MF	(Spain)	Álex Baena	6	0	0	0	6
2	22	DF	(Spain)	Álex Grimaldo	5	0	0	0	5
3	20	MF	(Argentina)	Giuliano Simeone	4	0	0	0	4
4	15	FW	(Canada)	Jonathan David	3	0	0	0	3
5	7	MF	(South Korea)	Lee Kang-in	2	0	0	0	2
5	11	FW	(Nigeria)	Ademola Lookman	1	0	0	1	2
5	19	FW	(Argentina)	Julián Alvarez	1	0	0	1	2
8	5	MF	(United States)	Johnny Cardoso	1	0	0	0	1
8	8	MF	(Spain)	Pablo Barrios	0	0	0	1	1
8	14	MF	(Spain)	Marcos Llorente	0	0	0	1	1
8	18	DF	(Spain)	Marc Pubill	1	0	0	0	1
8	21	DF	(Argentina)	Cristian Romero	1	0	0	0	1
8	24	DF	(Spain)	Robin Le Normand	1	0	0	0	1
Own goals					0	0	0	0	0
Totals					26	0	0	4	30

Source: FBREF

^{1}Player left the club during the season.
