= 2026 Copa del Rey final =

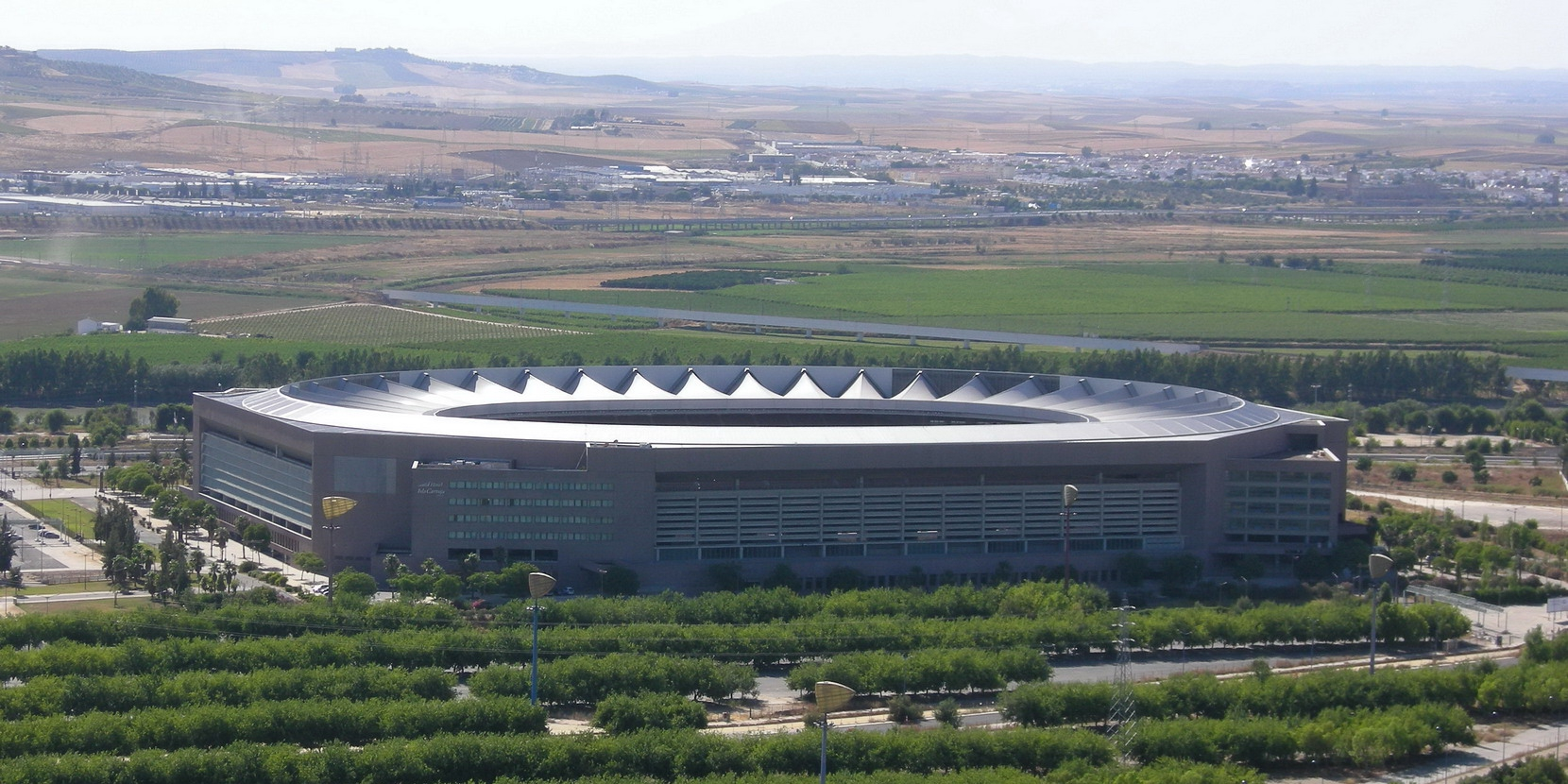
- Estadio de La Cartuja in Seville hosted the final.
- Event: 2025–26 Copa del Rey
Atlético Madrid	Real Sociedad
2	2
- After extra time Real Sociedad won 4–3 on penalties
- Date: 18 April 2026
- Venue: La Cartuja, Seville
- Man of the Match: Unai Marrero (Real Sociedad)
- Referee: Javier Alberola Rojas
- Attendance: 70,000

The 2026 Copa del Rey final was a football match to decide the winners of the 2025–26 Copa del Rey, the 124th edition of Spain's primary football cup (including two seasons where two rival editions were played). The match was played on 18 April 2026 at Estadio de La Cartuja in Seville between Atlético Madrid and Real Sociedad.

Real Sociedad won the match 4–3 on penalties following 2–2 after extra time, securing their fourth cup title.

== Route to the final ==
Atlético Madrid		Round	Real Sociedad
Opponent	Result		Opponent	Result
Bye		First round	Negreira	3–0 (A)
Bye		Second round	Reus FCR	2–0 (A)
Atlético Baleares	3–2 (A)	Round of 32	Eldense	2–1 (A)
Deportivo La Coruña	1–0 (A)	Round of 16	Osasuna	2–2 (4–3 p) (H)
Real Betis	5–0 (A)	Quarter-finals	Alavés	3–2 (A)
Barcelona	4–0 (H), 0–3 (A)	Semi-finals	Athletic Bilbao	1–0 (A), 1–0 (H)

Key: (H) = Home; (A) = Away

== Match ==
=== Details ===
18 April 2026
21:00 CEST

Atlético Madrid	2–2 (a.e.t.)	Real Sociedad
Lookman 18'; Alvarez 83'	Report	Barrenetxea 1'; Oyarzabal 45+1' (pen.)
Penalties
Sørloth (penalty missed); Alvarez (penalty missed); González (penalty scored); Almada (penalty scored); Baena (penalty scored)	3–4	(penalty scored) Soler; (penalty missed) Óskarsson; (penalty scored) Sučić; (penalty scored) Muñoz; (penalty scored) Marín

La Cartuja, Seville
Attendance: 70,000
Referee: Javier Alberola Rojas

Atlético Madrid	Real Sociedad

GK	1	(Argentina) Juan Musso	(yellow card) 44'
RB	16	(Argentina) Nahuel Molina		(substituted off) 79'
CB	18	(Spain) Marc Pubill
CB	24	(Spain) Robin Le Normand	(yellow card) 34'
LB	3	(Italy) Matteo Ruggeri		(substituted off) 63'
RM	20	(Argentina) Giuliano Simeone		(substituted off) 71'
CM	14	(Spain) Marcos Llorente		(substituted off) 102'
CM	6	(Spain) Koke (c)
LM	22	(Nigeria) Ademola Lookman		(substituted off) 63'
CF	7	(France) Antoine Griezmann		(substituted off) 71'
CF	19	(Argentina) Julián Alvarez
Substitutes:
GK	13	(Slovenia) Jan Oblak
DF	15	(France) Clément Lenglet		(substituted on) 102'
DF	32	(Spain) Javier Boñar
MF	4	(Spain) Rodrigo Mendoza
MF	5	(United States) Johnny Cardoso		(substituted on) 79'
MF	8	(Spain) Pablo Barrios
MF	10	(Spain) Álex Baena		(substituted on) 71'
MF	11	(Argentina) Thiago Almada		(substituted on) 71'
MF	21	(Mexico) Obed Vargas
MF	23	(Argentina) Nico González		(substituted on) 63'
FW	9	(Norway) Alexander Sørloth		(substituted on) 63'
Manager:
(Argentina) Diego Simeone

GK	13	(Spain) Unai Marrero
RB	2	(Venezuela) Jon Aramburu		(substituted off) 114'
CB	31	(Spain) Jon Martín
CB	16	(Croatia) Duje Ćaleta-Car
LB	17	(Spain) Sergio Gómez		(substituted off) 89'
CM	8	(Spain) Beñat Turrientes		(substituted off) 69'
CM	18	(Spain) Carlos Soler
RW	7	(Spain) Ander Barrenetxea		(substituted off) 69'
AM	24	(Croatia) Luka Sučić
LW	11	(Portugal) Gonçalo Guedes		(substituted off) 79'
CF	10	(Spain) Mikel Oyarzabal (c)	(yellow card) 32'	(substituted off) 79'
Substitutes:
GK	1	(Spain) Álex Remiro
DF	3	(Spain) Aihen Muñoz		(substituted on) 79'
DF	6	(Spain) Aritz Elustondo	(yellow card) 120+1'	(substituted on) 114'
DF	38	(Spain) Luken Beitia
MF	4	(Spain) Jon Gorrotxategi	(yellow card) 120'	(substituted on) 69'
MF	12	(Venezuela) Yangel Herrera
MF	14	(Japan) Takefusa Kubo		(substituted on) 89'
MF	15	(Spain) Pablo Marín		(substituted on) 69'
MF	23	(Spain) Brais Méndez
FW	9	(Iceland) Orri Óskarsson		(substituted on) 79'
FW	22	(Brazil) Wesley
Manager:
(United States) Pellegrino Matarazzo

Man of the Match:
Unai Marrero (Real Sociedad)

Assistant referees:
Alfredo Rodríguez
Jorge Bueno
Fourth official:
Adrián Cordero
Reserve assistant referee:
José Luis Martínez
Video assistant referee:
Jorge Figueroa
Assistant video assistant referees:
Daniel Trujillo
Luis Mario Milla

Match rules

- 90 minutes.
- 30 minutes of extra time if necessary.
- Penalty shoot-out if scores still level.
- Eleven named substitutes.
- Maximum of five substitutions, with a sixth allowed in extra time. (Note: Each team was given only three opportunities to make substitutions, with a fourth opportunity in extra time, excluding substitutions made at half-time, before the start of extra time and at half-time in extra time.)
