= 2025–26 Atlético Madrid season =

Atlético Madrid
2025–26 season
- President: Enrique Cerezo
- Head coach: Diego Simeone
- Stadium: Riyadh Air Metropolitano
- La Liga: 4th
- Copa del Rey: Runners-up
- Supercopa de España: Semi-finals
- UEFA Champions League: Semi-finals
- Top goalscorer: League: Alexander Sørloth (13); All: Julián Alvarez; Alexander Sørloth (20 each)
- Average home league attendance: 60,855
- Biggest win: 5–0 vs Real Betis (A)
- Biggest defeat: 0–4 vs Arsenal (A); 1–5 vs Villarreal (A)
Home colours	Away colours	Third colours

The 2025–26 season was the 123rd season in the history of Atlético Madrid, and the club's 24th consecutive season in La Liga. In addition to the domestic league, the club participated in the Copa del Rey, the Supercopa de España and the UEFA Champions League.

== Kits ==
Home	Home alt	Home alt 2	Away	Third	Retro Matchday Kit	Goalkeeper 1	Goalkeeper 2	Goalkeeper 3	Total 90 1.	Total 90 2.

== Players ==
As of 2 May 2026

Note: Flags indicate national team as defined under FIFA eligibility rules; some limited exceptions apply. Players may hold more than one non-FIFA nationality.

No.	Pos.	Nation	Player
1	GK	ARG	Juan Musso
2	DF	URU	José Giménez (3rd captain)
3	DF	ITA	Matteo Ruggeri
4	MF	ESP	Rodrigo Mendoza
5	MF	USA	Johnny Cardoso
6	MF	ESP	Koke (captain)
7	FW	FRA	Antoine Griezmann
8	MF	ESP	Pablo Barrios
9	FW	NOR	Alexander Sørloth
10	MF	ESP	Álex Baena
11	MF	ARG	Thiago Almada
13	GK	SLO	Jan Oblak (vice-captain)
14	MF	ESP	Marcos Llorente
15	DF	FRA	Clément Lenglet
16	DF	ARG	Nahuel Molina
17	DF	SVK	Dávid Hancko
18	DF	ESP	Marc Pubill

No.	Pos.	Nation	Player
19	FW	ARG	Julián Alvarez
20	MF	ARG	Giuliano Simeone
21	MF	MEX	Obed Vargas
22	FW	NGR	Ademola Lookman
23	MF	ARG	Nico González (on loan from Juventus)
24	DF	ESP	Robin Le Normand
27	MF	ESP	Jano Monserrate
28	MF	ESP	Taufik Seidu
29	FW	ESP	Rayane Belaid
30	DF	ESP	Dani Martínez
32	DF	ESP	Javier Boñar
34	DF	ESP	Julio Díaz
28	MF	ESP	Iker Luque
40	MF	SRB	Aleksa Purić
47	MF	ESP	Javi Morcillo
61	MF	ESP	Miguel Cubo

== Transfers ==
=== In ===
Date	Pos.	Player	From	Type	Fee	Ref.
9 June 2025	DF	(France) Clément Lenglet	Barcelona	Transfer	Free	
10 June 2025	GK	(Argentina) Juan Musso	(Italy) Atalanta	Transfer	€3M	
30 June 2025	GK	(Romania) Horațiu Moldovan	(Italy) Sassuolo	Loan return		
30 June 2025	MF	(Spain) Saúl	Sevilla	Loan return		
1 July 2025	DF	(Italy) Matteo Ruggeri	(Italy) Atalanta	Transfer	€17M	
2 July 2025	MF	(Spain) Álex Baena	Villarreal	Transfer	€42M	
16 July 2025	MF	(United States) Johnny Cardoso	Real Betis	Transfer	€30M	
17 July 2025	MF	(Argentina) Thiago Almada	(Brazil) Botafogo	Transfer	€21M	
23 July 2025	DF	(Spain) Marc Pubill	Almería	Transfer	€16M	
24 July 2025	DF	(Slovakia) Dávid Hancko	(Netherlands) Feyenoord	Transfer	€26M	
31 July 2025	DF	(Uruguay) Santiago Mouriño	Alavés	Transfer	€4M	
11 August 2025	FW	(Italy) Giacomo Raspadori	(Italy) Napoli	Transfer	€22M	
1 September 2025	FW	(Argentina) Nico González	(Italy) Juventus	Loan		
2 February 2026	FW	(Nigeria) Ademola Lookman	(Italy) Atalanta	Transfer	€35M	
2 February 2026	MF	(Mexico) Obed Vargas	(United States) Seattle Sounders	Transfer	€9M	
2 February 2026	MF	(Spain) Rodrigo Mendoza	Elche	Transfer	€16M	

Total expenditure: ▼€241 million (excluding potential add-ons, bonuses, undisclosed figures and future transfers)

=== Out ===
Date	Pos.	Player	To	Type	Fee	Ref.
30 June 2025	DF	(Mozambique) Reinildo Mandava	(England) Sunderland	End of contract		
30 June 2025	DF	(Spain) César Azpilicueta	Sevilla	End of contract		
30 June 2025	DF	(Belgium) Axel Witsel	Girona	End of contract		
4 July 2025	MF	(Spain) Rodrigo Riquelme	Real Betis	Transfer	€8M	
9 July 2025	FW	(Argentina) Ángel Correa	(Mexico) UANL	Transfer	€8M	
18 July 2025	GK	(Romania) Horațiu Moldovan	Oviedo	Loan		
23 July 2025	MF	(Spain) Saúl	(Brazil) Flamengo	Released		
25 July 2025	MF	(Argentina) Rodrigo De Paul	(United States) Inter Miami	Transfer	€15M	
30 July 2025	MF	(Brazil) Samuel Lino	(Brazil) Flamengo	Transfer	€22M	
30 July 2025	MF	(France) Thomas Lemar	Girona	Loan		
1 August 2025	DF	(Uruguay) Santiago Mouriño	Villarreal	Transfer	€10M	
24 December 2025	DF	(Spain) Javi Galán	Osasuna	Transfer	€0.5M	
2 January 2026	FW	(Spain) Carlos Martín	Rayo Vallecano	Loan		
14 January 2026	MF	(England) Conor Gallagher	(England) Tottenham Hotspur	Transfer	€41M	
15 January 2026	FW	(Italy) Giacomo Raspadori	(Italy) Atalanta	Transfer	€22M	

Total expenditure: ▲€126.5 million (excluding potential add-ons, bonuses, undisclosed figures and future transfers)

== Pre-season and friendlies ==
Win Draw Loss Fixtures

3 August 2025 Friendly	Porto	1–0	Atlético Madrid	Porto, Portugal
19:00 WEST (UTC+1)	Froholdt 45+1'	Report	Alvarez (yellow card) 44'; Griezmann (yellow card) 47'	Stadium: Estádio do Dragão; Attendance: 49,227; Referee: David Baquini da Silva (Brazil)

6 August 2025 Friendly	Atlético Madrid	1–1	Rayo Vallecano	Majadahonda, Spain
20:00 WEST (UTC+2)	Griezmann 15'	Report	De Frutos 7'	Stadium: Estadio Cerro del Espino; Attendance: 0 Referee: Álvaro Rodríguez Recio

9 August 2025 Sela Cup	Newcastle United	0–2	Atlético Madrid	Newcastle upon Tyne, England
16:00 BST (UTC+1)		Report	Hancko (yellow card) 33'; Alvarez 50'; Griezmann 63'; Seidu (yellow card) 78'	Stadium: St James' Park; Referee: Jarred Gillett (England)

10 October 2025 Reconstruction Cup-FDRL	Atlético Madrid	1–1 (4–2 p)	Inter Milan	Benghazi, Libya
18:20 EET (UTC+2)	Martín 35'; Ruggeri (yellow card) 63'	Report	Bisseck 59'; Acerbi (yellow card) 85'	Stadium: Benghazi International Stadium; Attendance: 42,000; Referee: Mustafa Al-Darsi (Libya)
	Penalties
	Griezmann (penalty scored); Koke (penalty missed); Ruggeri (penalty scored); Janneh (penalty scored); Lenglet (penalty scored)		(penalty scored) Venturini; (penalty scored) Lavelli; (penalty missed) Luis Henrique; (penalty missed) Acerbi

== Competitions ==
=== Overall record ===
Competition	First match	Last match	Starting round	Final position	Record							
Competition	First match	Last match	Starting round	Final position	Pld	W	D	L	GF	GA	GD	Win %
La Liga	17 August 2025	24 May 2026	Matchday 1	4th	38	21	6	11	62	44	+18	55.26
Copa del Rey	17 December 2025	18 April 2026	Round of 32	Runners-up	6	4	1	1	15	7	+8	66.67
Supercopa de España	8 January 2026		Semi-finals	Semi-finals	1	0	0	1	1	2	−1	0.00
UEFA Champions League	17 September 2025	5 May 2026	League phase	Semi-finals	16	7	3	6	35	28	+7	43.75
Total					61	32	10	19	113	81	+32	52.46

Source: Soccerway

=== La Liga ===
==== League table ====
Pos	Team	Pld	W	D	L	GF	GA	GD	Pts	Qualification or relegation
2	Real Madrid	38	27	5	6	77	35	+42	86	Qualification for the Champions League league phase (Note: La Liga gained an additional Champions League place as a result of Spain gaining one of the two European Performance Spots (EPS) awarded to the two associations with the highest UEFA coefficient points in 2025–26.)
3	Villarreal	38	22	6	10	72	46	+26	72	Qualification for the Champions League league phase
4	Atlético Madrid	38	21	6	11	62	44	+18	69	Qualification for the Champions League league phase
5	Real Betis	38	15	15	8	59	48	+11	60	Qualification for the Champions League league phase
6	Celta Vigo	38	14	12	12	53	48	+5	54	Qualification for the Europa League league phase

Source: LaLiga EA Sports
Rules for classification: 1) Points; 2) Head-to-head points; 3) Head-to-head goal difference; 4) Goal difference; 5) Goals scored; 6) Fair-play points
(Note: Head-to-head record is used only after all the matches between the teams in question have been played)

==== Results summary ====
Overall								Home						Away					
Pld	W	D	L	GF	GA	GD	Pts	W	D	L	GF	GA	GD	W	D	L	GF	GA	GD
38	21	6	11	62	44	+18	69	15	1	3	39	17	+22	6	5	8	23	27	−4

Source: La Liga

==== Results by round ====
Round	1	2	3	4	5	6	7	8	9	10	11	12	13	14	19^{1}	15	16	17	18	20	21	22	23	24	25	26	27	28	29	30	31	33	32	34	35	36	37	38
Ground	A	H	A	H	A	H	H	A	H	A	H	H	A	H	A	A	H	A	A	H	H	A	H	A	H	A	H	H	A	H	A	A	H	A	H	A	H	A
Result	L	D	D	W	D	W	W	D	W	W	W	W	W	W	L	L	W	W	D	W	W	D	L	L	W	W	W	W	L	L	L	L	W	W	L	W	W	L
Position	15	13	16	11	12	8	5	5	4	4	4	4	4	4	4	4	4	3	4	4	3	3	3	4	4	3	3	3	4	4	4	4	4	4	4	4	4	4

Source: La Liga
A = Away; H = Home; W = Win; D = Draw; L = Loss

^{1} Matchday 19 (vs Barcelona) was brought forward due to both clubs' involvement in the 2026 Supercopa de España.

==== Matches ====
The match schedule was released on 1 July 2025.

17 August 2025 1	Espanyol	2–1	Atlético Madrid	Cornellà de Llobregat
21:30 CEST (UTC+2)	Calero (yellow card) 54'; Rubio 73'; El Hilali (yellow card) 74'; Milla 84'; Salinas (yellow card) 90+3'	Report	Alvarez 37'; Cardoso (yellow card) 42'; Le Normand (yellow card) 67'; Llorente (yellow card) 72'	Stadium: RCDE Stadium; Attendance: 29,612; Referee: Mateo Busquets Ferrer

23 August 2025 2	Atlético Madrid	1–1	Elche	Madrid
19:30 CEST (UTC+2)	Sørloth 8'	Report	Mir 15'; Febas (yellow card) 29'; Mendoza (yellow card) 45'; Dituro (yellow card) 90'	Stadium: Riyadh Air Metropolitano; Attendance: 59,369; Referee: César Soto Grado

30 August 2025 3	Alavés	1–1	Atlético Madrid	Vitoria-Gasteiz
17:00 CEST (UTC+2)	Vicente 14' (pen.); Diarra (yellow card) 38'; Parada (yellow card) 84'	Report	Simeone 7'; Cardoso (yellow card) 29'; Sørloth (yellow card) 42'; Koke (yellow card) 90+4'	Stadium: Mendizorrotza; Attendance: 18,042; Referee: Víctor García Verdura

13 September 2025 4	Atlético Madrid	2–0	Villarreal	Madrid
21:00 CEST (UTC+2)	Barrios 9'; Alvarez (yellow card) 32'; González 52'; Ruggeri (yellow card) 73'	Report	Parejo (yellow card) 24'; Veiga (yellow card) 65'; Mouriño (yellow card) 84'; Pedraza (yellow card) 90+4'	Stadium: Riyadh Air Metropolitano; Attendance: 63,312; Referee: José Luis Munuera Montero

21 September 2025 5	Mallorca	1–1	Atlético Madrid	Palma
16:15 CEST (UTC+2)	Muriqi 85'	Report	Alvarez (penalty missed) 14'; Sørloth (red card) 72'; Gallagher 79'	Stadium: Estadi Mallorca Son Moix; Attendance: 21,027; Referee: Francisco José Hernández Maeso

24 September 2025 6	Atlético Madrid	3–2	Rayo Vallecano	Madrid
21:30 CEST (UTC+2)	Alvarez 15', 80', 88'; Koke (yellow card) 51'; Llorente (yellow card) 86'; Le Normand (yellow card) 90+6'	Report	Chavarría 45+1', (yellow card) 87'; Balliu (yellow card) 54'; García 77'; Ciss (yellow card) 90+2'; Rațiu (yellow card) 90+7'; Camello (yellow card) 90+8'	Stadium: Riyadh Air Metropolitano; Attendance: 54,098; Referee: Alejandro Hernández Hernández

27 September 2025 7	Atlético Madrid	5–2	Real Madrid	Madrid
16:15 CEST (UTC+2)	Le Normand 14'; Sørloth (yellow card) 22', (goal) 45+3'; González (yellow card) 40'; Alvarez 51' (pen.), 63'; Lenglet (yellow card) 56'; Simeone (yellow card) 82'; Griezmann 90+3'; Gallagher (yellow card) 90+5'	Report	Mbappé 25'; Güler 36', (yellow card) 50'; Asencio (yellow card) 58'; Carreras (yellow card) 62'; Mastantuono (yellow card) 90+6'	Stadium: Riyadh Air Metropolitano; Attendance: 69,167; Referee: Javier Alberola Rojas

5 October 2025 8	Celta Vigo	1–1	Atlético Madrid	Vigo
21:00 CEST (UTC+2)	Iglesias (yellow card) 65'; Aspas 68'	Report	Starfelt 6' (o.g.); Lenglet (yellow card) 25' (yellow-red card) 40'; Baena (yellow card) 78'	Stadium: Balaídos; Attendance: 20,877; Referee: César Soto Grado

18 October 2025 9	Atlético Madrid	1–0	Osasuna	Madrid
21:00 CEST (UTC+2)	Koke (yellow card) 30'; Almada 69'	Report	Catena (yellow card) 66'; Ra. García (yellow card) 81'; Boyomo (yellow card) 90'	Stadium: Riyadh Air Metropolitano; Attendance: 62,884; Referee: Ricardo de Burgos Bengoetxea

27 October 2025 10	Real Betis	0–2	Atlético Madrid	Seville
21:00 CET (UTC+1)	Lo Celso (yellow card) 85'; Amrabat (yellow card) 90+1'	Report	Simeone 3'; Baena 45+1'; González (yellow card) 84'	Stadium: La Cartuja; Attendance: 57,537; Referee: Juan Martínez Munuera

1 November 2025 11	Atlético Madrid	3–0	Sevilla	Madrid
16:15 CET (UTC+1)	Alvarez 64' (pen.); Almada 77'; Griezmann 90'	Report	Romero (yellow card) 54'; Nianzou (yellow card) 63'; Vlachodimos (yellow card) 77'	Stadium: Riyadh Air Metropolitano; Attendance: 66,119; Referee: Francisco José Hernández Maeso

8 November 2025 12	Atlético Madrid	3–1	Levante	Madrid
18:30 CET (UTC+1)	De la Fuente 12' (o.g.); Griezmann 61', 80'; Molina (yellow card) 84'; Llorente (yellow card) 87'; Giménez (yellow card) 90'	Report	Sánchez 21'; Olasagasti (yellow card) 40'	Stadium: Riyadh Air Metropolitano; Attendance: 60,119; Referee: Jesús Gil Manzano

23 November 2025 13	Getafe	0–1	Atlético Madrid	Getafe
18:30 CET (UTC+1)	Abqar (yellow card) 40'; Martín (yellow card) 79'	Report	Alvarez (yellow card) 49'; Giménez (yellow card) 57'; Duarte 82' (o.g.); Musso (yellow card) 90+1'	Stadium: Coliseum; Attendance: 9,783; Referee: Guillermo Cuadra Fernández

29 November 2025 14	Atlético Madrid	2–0	Oviedo	Madrid
21:00 CET (UTC+1)	Sørloth 16', 26'	Report	Carmo (yellow card) 54'	Stadium: Riyadh Air Metropolitano; Attendance: 61,305; Referee: Víctor García Verdura

2 December 2025 19	Barcelona	3–1	Atlético Madrid	Barcelona
21:00 CET (UTC+1)	Raphinha 26'; Lewandowski (penalty missed) 36'; Martín (yellow card) 45+2'; Olmo 65'; Torres 90+6'	Report	Baena 19', (yellow card) 41'	Stadium: Estadi Olímpic Lluís Companys; Attendance: 45,205; Referee: Ricardo de Burgos Bengoetxea
Note: The match date was pushed forward due to both clubs' involvement in the 2026 Supercopa de España.

6 December 2025 15	Athletic Bilbao	1–0	Atlético Madrid	Bilbao
21:00 CET (UTC+1)	Jauregizar (yellow card) 14'; Ruiz de Galarreta (yellow card) 20'; Laporte (yellow card) 28'; Berenguer 85'	Report	Gallagher (yellow card) 12'; Koke (yellow card) 90+4'	Stadium: San Mamés; Attendance: 48,904; Referee: Alejandro Muñiz Ruiz

13 December 2025 16	Atlético Madrid	2–1	Valencia	Madrid
14:00 CET (UTC+1)	Koke 17'; Pubill (yellow card) 32'; Sørloth (yellow card) 42'; Griezmann 74'; Almada (yellow card) 90'	Report	Beltrán 63'; Duro (yellow card) 88'	Stadium: Riyadh Air Metropolitano; Attendance: 61,011; Referee: César Soto Grado

21 December 2025 17	Girona	0–3	Atlético Madrid	Girona
14:00 CET (UTC+1)	Martínez (yellow card) 57'; Lemar (yellow card) 84'	Report	Koke 13'; Gallagher 38'; Griezmann 90+2'	Stadium: Montilivi; Attendance: 12,363; Referee: José Luis Guzmán Mansilla

4 January 2026 18	Real Sociedad	1–1	Atlético Madrid	San Sebastián
21:00 CET (UTC+1)	Guedes (yellow card) 13', (goal) 55'; Ćaleta-Car (yellow card) 45+2'; Oyarzabal (yellow card) 75'	Report	Ruggeri (yellow card) 44'; Sørloth 50'; Raspadori (yellow card) 78'	Stadium: Anoeta; Attendance: 31,576; Referee: Juan Martínez Munuera

18 January 2026 20	Atlético Madrid	1–0	Alavés	Madrid
16:15 CET (UTC+1)	Cardoso (yellow card) 27'; Sørloth 48'	Report	Ibáñez (yellow card) 6'	Stadium: Riyadh Air Metropolitano; Attendance: 61,192; Referee: Guillermo Cuadra Fernández

25 January 2026 21	Atlético Madrid	3–0	Mallorca	Madrid
14:00 CET (UTC+1)	Sørloth 22'; Giménez (yellow card) 55'; González (yellow card) 62'; López 75' (o.g.); Almada 87'	Report	López (yellow card) 86'	Stadium: Riyadh Air Metropolitano; Attendance: 55,028; Referee: José María Sánchez Martínez

31 January 2026 22	Levante	0–0	Atlético Madrid	Valencia
18:30 CET (UTC+1)	De la Fuente (yellow card) 84'; Olasagasti (yellow card) 90+2'	Report	Lenglet (yellow card) 21'	Stadium: Ciutat de València; Attendance: 20,573; Referee: Víctor García Verdura

8 February 2026 23	Atlético Madrid	0–1	Real Betis	Madrid
18:30 CET (UTC+1)	Ruggeri (yellow card) 25'; Lookman (yellow card) 56'; Baena (yellow card) 83'	Report	Antony 28'; Ezzalzouli (yellow card) 71'	Stadium: Riyadh Air Metropolitano; Attendance: 65,210; Referee: Mateo Busquets Ferrer

15 February 2026 24	Rayo Vallecano	3–0	Atlético Madrid	Leganés
16:15 CET (UTC+1)	Pérez 40'; Valentín 45'; Mendy 76'; García (yellow card) 90+2'	Report	Cardoso (yellow card) 29'; Mendoza (yellow card) 52'; Llorente (yellow card) 70'	Stadium: Butarque; Attendance: 5,335; Referee: Ricardo de Burgos Bengoetxea
Note: The match was played at Butarque in Leganés, instead of Rayo Vallecano's regular stadium, Vallecas in Madrid, due to the Vallecas pitch being deemed unsafe.

21 February 2026 25	Atlético Madrid	4–2	Espanyol	Madrid
21:00 CET (UTC+1)	Sørloth 21', 72'; Simeone 49'; Lookman 58'	Report	Carreras 6'; Expósito 80'; Ngonge (yellow card) 83'	Stadium: Riyadh Air Metropolitano; Attendance: 56,412; Referee: Alejandro Muñiz Ruiz

28 February 2026 26	Oviedo	0–1	Atlético Madrid	Oviedo
21:00 CET (UTC+1)	Vidal (yellow card) 42'; López (yellow card) 71'	Report	Le Normand (yellow card) 45'; Molina (yellow card) 71'; Alvarez 90+4'	Stadium: Carlos Tartiere; Attendance: 27,067; Referee: César Soto Grado

7 March 2026 27	Atlético Madrid	3–2	Real Sociedad	Madrid
18:30 CET (UTC+1)	Sørloth 5'; Hancko (yellow card) 20'; González 67', 81'	Report	Soler 9'; Óskarsson (yellow card) 49'; Oyarzabal 68'	Stadium: Riyadh Air Metropolitano; Attendance: 60,788; Referee: Adrián Cordero Vega

14 March 2026 28	Atlético Madrid	1–0	Getafe	Madrid
16:15 CET (UTC+1)	Molina 8', (yellow card) 90+8'; Sørloth (yellow card) 55'; Vargas (yellow card) 68'	Report	Abqar (red card) 55'; Romero (yellow card) 60'; Liso (yellow card) 77'; Satriano (yellow card) 90+10'	Stadium: Riyadh Air Metropolitano; Attendance: 58,893; Referee: Miguel Ángel Ortiz Arias

22 March 2026 29	Real Madrid	3–2	Atlético Madrid	Madrid
21:00 CET (UTC+1)	Vinícius 52' (pen.), 72'; Valverde 55', (red card) 77'; Pitarch (yellow card) 63'	Report	Cardoso (yellow card) 27'; Lookman 33'; Ruggeri (yellow card) 36'; Hancko (yellow card) 61'; Molina 66'; Llorente (yellow card) 68'	Stadium: Bernabéu; Attendance: 77,964; Referee: Juan Martínez Munuera

4 April 2026 30	Atlético Madrid	1–2	Barcelona	Madrid
21:00 CEST (UTC+2)	González (yellow card) 22' (yellow-red card) 45+7'; Simeone 39'; Koke (yellow card) 45'; Molina (yellow card) 45'; Musso (yellow card) 50'; Lenglet (yellow card) 53'; Seidu (yellow card) 90+3'	Report	Rashford 42'; López (yellow card) 45'; Martín (yellow card) 50'; Lewandowski 87'	Stadium: Riyadh Air Metropolitano; Attendance: 67,710; Referee: Mateo Busquets Ferrer

11 April 2026 31	Sevilla	2–1	Atlético Madrid	Seville
21:00 CEST (UTC+2)	Adams 10' (pen.); Bueno (yellow card) 36'; Gudelj 45+2', (yellow card) 88'; Juanlu (yellow card) 67'; Peque (yellow card) 90+6'	Report	Boñar 35'; Díaz (yellow card) 44'; Baena (yellow card) 75'; Griezmann (yellow card) 76'; Morcillo (yellow card) 90+5'	Stadium: Ramón Sánchez Pizjuán; Attendance: 29,723; Referee: Isidro Díaz de Mera Escuderos

22 April 2026 33	Elche	3–2	Atlético Madrid	Elche
19:00 CEST (UTC+2)	Affengruber 18'; Silva 33' (pen.), 75'; Febas (yellow card) 45+4'; Sangaré (yellow card) 45+4'	Report	González 10', 34'; Almada (red card) 30'; Lenglet (yellow card) 36'; Díaz (yellow card) 38'	Stadium: Martínez Valero; Attendance: 27,587; Referee: Guillermo Cuadra Fernández

25 April 2026 32	Atlético Madrid	3–2	Athletic Bilbao	Madrid
21:00 CEST (UTC+2)	Griezmann 49'; Sørloth 54', 90+3'	Report	Paredes 23'; Guruzeta 90+7'	Stadium: Riyadh Air Metropolitano; Attendance: 56,598; Referee: Jesús Gil Manzano

2 May 2026 34	Valencia	0–2	Atlético Madrid	Valencia
16:15 CEST (UTC+2)	Tárrega (yellow card) 67'	Report	Almada (yellow card) 29'; Mendoza (yellow card) 52'; Vargas (yellow card) 61'; Luque 74'; Cubo 82'	Stadium: Mestalla; Attendance: 45,889; Referee: José Luis Munuera Montero

9 May 2026 35	Atlético Madrid	0–1	Celta Vigo	Madrid
18:30 CEST (UTC+2)	Baena (yellow card) 66'	Report	Moriba (yellow card) 19'; Iglesias 62'; López (yellow card) 77'	Stadium: Riyadh Air Metropolitano; Attendance: 52,643; Referee: Iosu Galech Apezteguía

12 May 2026 36	Osasuna	1–2	Atlético Madrid	Pamplona
21:30 CEST (UTC+2)	Galán (yellow card) 14'; Ru. García (yellow card) 30'; Budimir (yellow card) 45+9'; Barja (yellow card) 57', (goal) 90+1'; Catena (yellow card) 85'; Boyomo (yellow card) 90+2'	Report	Lookman 15' (pen.); Llorente (yellow card) 52' (yellow-red card) 79'; Koke (yellow card) 57'; Pubill (yellow card) 59'; Sørloth 71'; Le Normand (yellow card) 85'	Stadium: El Sadar; Attendance: 18,647; Referee: José Luis Guzmán Mansilla

17 May 2026 37	Atlético Madrid	1–0	Girona	Madrid
19:00 CEST (UTC+2)	Lookman 21'; Le Normand (yellow card) 23'; Morcillo (yellow card) 85'	Report		Stadium: Riyadh Air Metropolitano; Attendance: 64,396; Referee: Alejandro Muñiz Ruiz

24 May 2026 38	Villarreal	5–1	Atlético Madrid	Villarreal
21:00 CEST (UTC+2)	Parejo 30' (pen.); Pérez 34', 54'; Mikautadze 40'; Gueye 45'	Report	Simeone (yellow card) 27'; Pubill 43'	Stadium: Estadio de la Cerámica; Attendance: 18,683; Referee: Miguel Sesma Espinosa

=== Copa del Rey ===
Atlético entered the tournament in the round of 32, as they qualified for the 2026 Supercopa de España.

17 December 2025 Round of 32	Atlético Baleares	2–3	Atlético Madrid	Palma de Mallorca
21:00 CET (UTC+1)	Bonet 28'; Tovar (penalty missed) 80'; Keita 90' (pen.)	Report	Griezmann 16', 72'; Raspadori 20'	Stadium: Estadi Balear; Attendance: 5,080; Referee: Alejandro Hernández Hernández

13 January 2026 Round of 16	Deportivo La Coruña	0–1	Atlético Madrid	A Coruña
21:00 CET (UTC+1)		Report	Griezmann 61'	Stadium: Riazor; Attendance: 28,577; Referee: Ricardo de Burgos Bengoetxea

5 February 2026 Quarter-finals	Real Betis	0–5	Atlético Madrid	Seville
21:00 CET (UTC+1)	Natan (yellow card) 53'; Llorente (yellow card) 81'	Report	Hancko 12'; Simeone 30'; Lookman 37'; Griezmann 62'; Almada 83'	Stadium: La Cartuja; Attendance: 66,810; Referee: César Soto Grado

12 February 2026 Semi-finals; First leg	Atlético Madrid	4–0	Barcelona	Madrid
21:00 CET (UTC+1)	E. García 6' (o.g.); Griezmann 14'; Lookman 33'; Alvarez 45+2'; Simeone (yellow card) 50'; Llorente (yellow card) 51'; Baena (yellow card) 79'; Pubill (yellow card) 86'; Ruggeri (yellow card) 90+8'	Report	Casadó (yellow card) 26'; E. García (red card) 85'; López (yellow card) 86'; Olmo (yellow card) 86'	Stadium: Riyadh Air Metropolitano; Attendance: 69,200; Referee: Juan Martínez Munuera

3 March 2026 Semi-finals; Second leg	Barcelona	3–0 (3–4 agg.)	Atlético Madrid	Barcelona
21:00 CET (UTC+1)	Bernal 29', 72'; Raphinha 45+5' (pen.); Olmo (yellow card) 66'; Cancelo (yellow card) 67'; Yamal (yellow card) 90+3'	Report	Baena (yellow card) 90+5'	Stadium: Camp Nou; Attendance: 45,398; Referee: Ricardo de Burgos Bengoetxea

18 April 2026 Final	Atlético Madrid	2–2 (a.e.t.) (3–4 p)	Real Sociedad	Seville
21:00 CEST (UTC+2)	Lookman 18'; Le Normand (yellow card) 33'; Musso (yellow card) 43'; Alvarez 83'	Report	Barrenetxea 1'; Oyarzabal (yellow card) 31', (goal) 45+1' (pen.); Gorrotxategi (yellow card) 120'; Elustondo (yellow card) 120+1'	Stadium: La Cartuja; Attendance: 70,000; Referee: Javier Alberola Rojas
	Penalties
	Sørloth (penalty missed); Alvarez (penalty missed); González (penalty scored); Almada (penalty scored); Baena (penalty scored)		(penalty scored) Soler; (penalty missed) Óskarsson; (penalty scored) Sučić; (penalty scored) Muñoz; (penalty scored) Marín

=== Supercopa de España ===
8 January 2026 Semi-finals	Atlético Madrid	1–2	Real Madrid	Jeddah, Saudi Arabia
22:00 SAST (UTC+3)	Sørloth 58'	Report	Valverde 2'; Rodrygo 55'; Vinícius (yellow card) 81'	Stadium: King Abdullah Sports City Stadium; Attendance: 55,651; Referee: Mateo Busquets Ferrer

=== UEFA Champions League ===
==== League phase ====
The league phase draw was held on 28 August 2025.

Pos	Team	Pld	W	D	L	GF	GA	GD	Pts	Qualification
12	(The Football Association) Newcastle United	8	4	2	2	17	7	+10	14	Advance to knockout phase play-offs (seeded)
13	(Italian Football Federation) Juventus	8	3	4	1	14	10	+4	13	Advance to knockout phase play-offs (seeded)
14	(Royal Spanish Football Federation) Atlético Madrid	8	4	1	3	17	15	+2	13	Advance to knockout phase play-offs (seeded)
15	(Italian Football Federation) Atalanta	8	4	1	3	10	10	0	13	Advance to knockout phase play-offs (seeded)
16	(German Football Association) Bayer Leverkusen	8	3	3	2	13	14	−1	12	Advance to knockout phase play-offs (seeded)

Source: UEFA
Rules for classification: League phase tiebreakers

Round	1	2	3	4	5	6	7	8
Ground	A	H	A	H	H	A	A	H
Result	L	W	L	W	W	W	D	L
Position	23	10	19	17	12	8	12	14

Source: UEFA
A = Away; H = Home; W = Win; D = Draw; L = Loss

17 September 2025 1	Liverpool (England)	3–2	(Spain) Atlético Madrid	Liverpool, England
20:00 BST (UTC+1)	Robertson 4'; Salah 6'; Bradley (yellow card) 71'; Van Dijk 90+2'	Report	Le Normand (yellow card) 32'; Llorente 45+3', 81'; Lenglet (yellow card) 45+4'	Stadium: Anfield; Attendance: 59,057; Referee: Maurizio Mariani (Italy)

30 September 2025 2	Atlético Madrid (Spain)	5–1	(Germany) Eintracht Frankfurt	Madrid, Spain
21:00 CEST (UTC+2)	Raspadori 4'; Lenglet (yellow card) 13'; Le Normand 33'; Griezmann 45+1'; Simeone 70'; Alvarez 82' (pen.)	Report	Brown (yellow card) 41'; Burkardt 57'	Stadium: Riyadh Air Metropolitano; Attendance: 59,401; Referee: Slavko Vinčić (Slovenia)

21 October 2025 3	Arsenal (England)	4–0	(Spain) Atlético Madrid	London, England
20:00 BST (UTC+1)	Zubimendi (yellow card) 38'; Gabriel 57'; Martinelli 64'; Gyökeres 67', 70'	Report	Giménez (yellow card) 33'; Le Normand (yellow card) 75'	Stadium: Emirates Stadium; Attendance: 59,200; Referee: Davide Massa (Italy)

4 November 2025 4	Atlético Madrid (Spain)	3–1	(Belgium) Union Saint-Gilloise	Madrid, Spain
21:00 CET (UTC+1)	Alvarez 39'; Molina (yellow card) 68'; Gallagher 72'; Llorente 90+6'	Report	Van de Perre (yellow card) 45'; Niang (yellow card) 66'; Sykes 80'; Mac Allister (yellow card) 81'	Stadium: Riyadh Air Metropolitano; Attendance: 59,347; Referee: Espen Eskås (Norway)

26 November 2025 5	Atlético Madrid (Spain)	2–1	(Italy) Inter Milan	Madrid, Spain
21:00 CET (UTC+1)	Alvarez 9'; Giménez 90+3'	Report	Dimarco (yellow card) 44'; Zieliński 54'	Stadium: Riyadh Air Metropolitano; Attendance: 68,069; Referee: François Letexier (France)

9 December 2025 6	PSV Eindhoven (Netherlands)	2–3	(Spain) Atlético Madrid	Eindhoven, Netherlands
21:00 CET (UTC+1)	Til 10'; Saibari (yellow card) 20'; Schouten (yellow card) 33'; Mauro Júnior (yellow card) 41'; Gasiorowski (yellow card) 54'; Pepi 85'	Report	Alvarez 37'; Simeone (yellow card) 47'; Barrios (yellow card) 50'; Hancko 52'; Sørloth 56'; Ruggeri (yellow card) 90+2'	Stadium: Philips Stadion; Attendance: 34,800; Referee: Michael Oliver (England)

21 January 2026 7	Galatasaray (Turkey)	1–1	(Spain) Atlético Madrid	Istanbul, Turkey
20:45 TRT (UTC+3)	Llorente 20' (o.g.); Osimhen (yellow card) 29'; Sallai (yellow card) 61'; Lemina (yellow card) 83'	Report	Simeone 4', (yellow card) 67'; Pubill (yellow card) 29'; Almada (yellow card) 41'; Barrios (yellow card) 49'	Stadium: Rams Park; Attendance: 48,443; Referee: István Kovács (Romania)

28 January 2026 8	Atlético Madrid (Spain)	1–2	(Norway) Bodø/Glimt	Madrid, Spain
21:00 CET (UTC+1)	Sørloth 15'; Llorente (yellow card) 63'; Almada (yellow card) 85'	Report	Sjøvold 34'; Høgh 59'; Haikin (yellow card) 67'; Määttä (yellow card) 90+5'	Stadium: Riyadh Air Metropolitano; Attendance: 58,910; Referee: Maurizio Mariani (Italy)

==== Knockout phase ====
===== Knockout phase play-offs =====
The knockout phase play-off draw was held on 30 January 2026.

18 February 2026 First leg	Club Brugge (Belgium)	3–3	(Spain) Atlético Madrid	Bruges, Belgium
21:00 CET (UTC+1)	Onyedika 52', (yellow card) 76'; Tresoldi 60'; Tzolis 89'	Report	Alvarez 8' (pen.); Lookman 45+4'; Pubill (yellow card) 48'; Ordóñez 79' (o.g.); Baena (yellow card) 90+5'	Stadium: Jan Breydel Stadium; Attendance: 25,235; Referee: Glenn Nyberg (Sweden)

24 February 2026 Second leg	Atlético Madrid (Spain)	4–1 (7–4 agg.)	(Belgium) Club Brugge	Madrid, Spain
18:45 CET (UTC+1)	Sørloth 23', 76', 87'; Cardoso 48'; Llorente (yellow card) 85'	Report	Ordóñez 36', (yellow card) 40'; Vermant (yellow card) 85'	Stadium: Riyadh Air Metropolitano; Attendance: 66,756; Referee: Clément Turpin (France)

===== Round of 16 =====
The round of 16 draw was held on 27 February 2026.

10 March 2026 First leg	Atlético Madrid (Spain)	5–2	(England) Tottenham Hotspur	Madrid, Spain
21:00 CET (UTC+1)	Llorente 6'; Griezmann 14'; Alvarez 15', 55'; Le Normand 22'	Report	Spence (yellow card) 4'; Porro 26'; Richarlison (yellow card) 60'; Gray (yellow card) 62'; Solanke 76'; Danso (yellow card) 80'; Romero (yellow card) 85'	Stadium: Riyadh Air Metropolitano; Attendance: 64,168; Referee: Serdar Gözübüyük (Netherlands)

18 March 2026 Second leg	Tottenham Hotspur (England)	3–2 (5–7 agg.)	(Spain) Atlético Madrid	London, England
20:00 GMT (UTC±0)	Kolo Muani 30'; Simons 52', 90' (pen.); Porro (yellow card) 57'; Vicario (yellow card) 58'; Romero (yellow card) 70'; Udogie (yellow card) 72'	Report	Ruggeri (yellow card) 28'; Alvarez 47'; Lookman (yellow card) 56'; Hancko 75'; Sørloth (yellow card) 90+2'	Stadium: Tottenham Hotspur Stadium; Attendance: 49,568; Referee: Daniel Siebert (Germany)

===== Quarter-finals =====
The quarter-final draw was held on 27 February 2026, after the round of 16 draw.

8 April 2026 First leg	Barcelona (Spain)	0–2	(Spain) Atlético Madrid	Barcelona, Spain
21:00 CEST (UTC+2)	Cubarsí (red card) 44'; Gavi (yellow card) 65'; Cancelo (yellow card) 90+4'	Report	Koke (yellow card) 31'; Alvarez 45'; Pubill (yellow card) 45+1'; Baena (yellow card) 63'; Sørloth 70'	Stadium: Camp Nou; Attendance: 59,522; Referee: István Kovács (Romania)

14 April 2026 Second leg	Atlético Madrid (Spain)	1–2 (3–2 agg.)	(Spain) Barcelona	Madrid, Spain
21:00 CEST (UTC+2)	Lookman 31'	Report	Yamal 4'; Torres 24'; Gavi (yellow card) 70'; E. García (red card) 79'	Stadium: Riyadh Air Metropolitano; Attendance: 69,268; Referee: Clément Turpin (France)

===== Semi-finals =====
The semi-final draw was held on 27 February 2026, after the quarter-final draw.

29 April 2026 First leg	Atlético Madrid (Spain)	1–1	(England) Arsenal	Madrid, Spain
21:00 CEST (UTC+2)	Alvarez 56' (pen.); Hancko (yellow card) 78'	Report	Gyökeres 44' (pen.)	Stadium: Riyadh Air Metropolitano; Attendance: 68,421; Referee: Danny Makkelie (Netherlands)

5 May 2026 Second leg	Arsenal (England)	1–0 (2–1 agg.)	(Spain) Atlético Madrid	London, England
20:00 BST (UTC+1)	Saka 45'; Arrizabalaga (yellow card) 90+5'	Report	Pubill (yellow card) 81'; Koke (yellow card) 90+4'	Stadium: Emirates Stadium; Attendance: 58,874; Referee: Daniel Siebert (Germany)

== Statistics ==
=== Squad statistics ===
No.	Pos	Nat	Player	Total		La Liga		Copa del Rey		Supercopa de España		Champions League	
No.	Pos	Nat	Player	Apps	Goals	Apps	Goals	Apps	Goals	Apps	Goals	Apps	Goals
Goalkeepers
1	GK	(Argentina) ARG	Juan Musso	18	0	8	0	6	0	0	0	4	0
13	GK	(Slovenia) SLO	Jan Oblak	43	0	30	0	0	0	1	0	12	0
Defenders
2	DF	(Uruguay) URU	José Giménez	25	1	13+3	0	1+2	0	0	0	4+2	1
3	DF	(Italy) ITA	Matteo Ruggeri	47	0	20+6	0	5	0	1	0	13+2	0
15	DF	(France) FRA	Clément Lenglet	24	0	17+2	0	1+1	0	0	0	3	0
16	DF	(Argentina) ARG	Nahuel Molina	46	2	13+13	2	4+2	0	0+1	0	7+6	0
17	DF	(Slovakia) SVK	Dávid Hancko	49	3	27+3	0	4+1	1	1	0	13	2
18	DF	(Spain) ESP	Marc Pubill	36	1	15+4	1	5	0	1	0	8+3	0
24	DF	(Spain) ESP	Robin Le Normand	46	3	16+12	1	2+1	0	0+1	0	9+5	2
30	DF	(Spain) ESP	Dani Martínez	1	0	1	0	0	0	0	0	0	0
32	DF	(Spain) ESP	Javier Boñar	4	1	3+1	1	0	0	0	0	0	0
34	DF	(Spain) ESP	Julio Díaz	4	0	4	0	0	0	0	0	0	0
Midfielders
4	MF	(Spain) ESP	Rodrigo Mendoza	10	0	8	0	0+1	0	0	0	0+1	0
5	MF	(United States) USA	Johnny Cardoso	30	1	12+3	0	3+1	0	0+1	0	5+5	1
6	MF	(Spain) ESP	Koke	56	2	25+9	2	4+1	0	1	0	11+5	0
8	MF	(Spain) ESP	Pablo Barrios	35	1	20+3	1	1+2	0	0	0	8+1	0
10	MF	(Spain) ESP	Álex Baena	46	2	21+6	2	2+3	0	1	0	4+9	0
11	MF	(Argentina) ARG	Thiago Almada	40	4	16+11	3	1+4	1	0+1	0	1+6	0
14	MF	(Spain) ESP	Marcos Llorente	49	4	25+4	0	5	0	1	0	13+1	4
20	MF	(Argentina) ARG	Giuliano Simeone	53	7	26+5	4	5+1	1	1	0	15	2
21	MF	(Mexico) MEX	Obed Vargas	13	0	8+4	0	0+1	0	0	0	0	0
23	MF	(Argentina) ARG	Nico González	37	5	18+6	5	0+2	0	0	0	4+7	0
27	MF	(Spain) ESP	Jano Monserrate	2	0	0+2	0	0	0	0	0	0	0
28	MF	(Spain) ESP	Taufik Seidu	1	0	0+1	0	0	0	0	0	0	0
40	MF	(Serbia) SRB	Aleksa Purić	2	0	0+2	0	0	0	0	0	0	0
47	MF	(Spain) ESP	Javi Morcillo	5	0	1+4	0	0	0	0	0	0	0
Forwards
7	FW	(France) FRA	Antoine Griezmann	56	14	13+21	7	6	5	0+1	0	10+5	2
9	FW	(Norway) NOR	Alexander Sørloth	54	20	20+15	13	0+4	0	1	1	5+9	6
19	FW	(Argentina) ARG	Julián Alvarez	49	20	22+7	8	4	2	1	0	15	10
22	FW	(Nigeria) NGR	Ademola Lookman	24	9	9+3	4	4	3	0	0	7+1	2
29	FW	(Spain) ESP	Rayane Belaid	2	0	2	0	0	0	0	0	0	0
37	FW	(Spain) ESP	Iker Luque	1	1	0+1	1	0	0	0	0	0	0
61	FW	(Spain) ESP	Miguel Cubo	2	1	0+2	1	0	0	0	0	0	0
Players transferred/loaned out during the season
4	MF	(England) ENG	Conor Gallagher	27	3	4+15	2	1	0	1	0	3+3	1
12	FW	(Spain) ESP	Carlos Martín	2	0	0	0	1	0	0	0	0+1	0
21	DF	(Spain) ESP	Javi Galán	7	0	1+4	0	1	0	0	0	1	0
22	FW	(Italy) ITA	Giacomo Raspadori	15	2	2+10	0	1	1	0	0	2	1

Source: FBREF

=== Goalscorers ===
Rank	No.	Pos.	Nat.	Player	La Liga	Copa del Rey	Supercopa de España	Champions League	Total
1	9	FW	(Norway)	Alexander Sørloth	13	0	1	6	20
1	19	FW	(Argentina)	Julián Alvarez	8	2	0	10	20
3	7	FW	(France)	Antoine Griezmann	7	5	0	2	14
4	22	FW	(Nigeria)	Ademola Lookman	4	3	0	2	9
5	20	MF	(Argentina)	Giuliano Simeone	4	1	0	2	7
6	23	MF	(Argentina)	Nico González	5	0	0	0	5
7	11	MF	(Argentina)	Thiago Almada	3	1	0	0	4
7	14	MF	(Spain)	Marcos Llorente	0	0	0	4	4
9	4	MF	(England)	Conor Gallagher^{1}	2	0	0	1	3
9	17	DF	(Slovakia)	Dávid Hancko	0	1	0	2	3
9	24	DF	(Spain)	Robin Le Normand	1	0	0	2	3
12	6	MF	(Spain)	Koke	2	0	0	0	2
12	10	MF	(Spain)	Álex Baena	2	0	0	0	2
12	16	DF	(Argentina)	Nahuel Molina	2	0	0	0	2
12	22	FW	(Italy)	Giacomo Raspadori^{1}	0	1	0	1	2
16	2	DF	(Uruguay)	José Giménez	0	0	0	1	1
16	5	MF	(United States)	Johnny Cardoso	0	0	0	1	1
16	8	MF	(Spain)	Pablo Barrios	1	0	0	0	1
16	18	DF	(Spain)	Marc Pubill	1	0	0	0	1
16	32	DF	(Spain)	Javier Boñar	1	0	0	0	1
16	37	FW	(Spain)	Iker Luque	1	0	0	0	1
16	61	FW	(Spain)	Miguel Cubo	1	0	0	0	1
Own goals					4	1	0	1	6
Totals					62	15	1	35	113

Source: FBREF

^{1}Player left the club during the season.
