= Salvi Esquivel =

Spanish footballer (born 2006)

Personal information
- Full name: Salvador Esquivel Gamez
- Date of birth: 30 September 2005 (age 21)
- Place of birth: Estepona, Spain
- Height: 1.93 m (6 ft 4 in)
- Position: Goalkeeper

Team information
- Current team: Atlético Madrid
- Number: 25

Youth career
- 2011–2018: Esteponense
- 2018–2019: Estepona
- 2019–2020: San Félix
- 2020–2021: Málaga
- 2021–2024: Atlético Madrid

Senior career*
Years	Team	Apps	(Gls)
2022–2026	Atlético Madrid B	28	(0)
2026–	Atlético Madrid	0	(0)

International career^{‡}
2021	Spain U17	2	(0)
2023	Spain U18	1	(0)
2025–	Spain U21	3	(0)
- * Club domestic league appearances and goals as of 25 May 2026 ‡ National team caps and goals as of 31 March 2026

Salvador Esquivel Gamez (born 30 September 2005) is a Spanish professional footballer who plays as a goalkeeper for Atlético Madrid.

== Early life ==
Born in Estepona, Andalusia, Esquivel also played basketball while growing up. He represented hometown sides CDF Esteponense and Estepona FB before joining the youth sides of Málaga in 2019, although initially a member of affiliate team CD San Félix.

== Club career ==
Esquivel joined the youth categories of Atlético Madrid in July 2021, and signed a professional deal until 2024 in October. After being mainly a member of the Juvenil team, he had a tachycardia episode during a UEFA Europa League match against Celtic on 7 November 2023; he underwent several examinations after the match, and was declared fit to play afterwards, returning to trainings ten days later.

In May 2024, Esquivel suffered a knee injury which sidelined him for most of the season. He still renewed his link until 2027 on 18 July, and made his senior debut with the reserves on 22 March 2025, starting in a 0–0 Primera Federación home draw against Betis Deportivo.

Esquivel then profitted from the departures of both Alejandro Iturbe and Antonio Gomis from the B-team to establish himself as an undisputed starter for the side, while also acting as a third-choice in the first team. On 1 September 2026, he was definitely promoted to the main squad of Atleti, being assigned the number 25 jersey.

== International career ==
Esquivel is a Spain youth international. During the autumn of 2025 and the spring of 2026, he played for the Spain national under-21 football team for 2027 UEFA European Under-21 Championship qualification.

== Style of play ==
Esquivel plays as a goalkeeper. Left-footed, he is known for his reflexes.

== Career statistics ==
As of match played 6 June 2026

Appearances and goals by club, season and competition
Club	Season	League			Copa del Rey		Europe		Other		Total	
Club	Season	Division	Apps	Goals	Apps	Goals	Apps	Goals	Apps	Goals	Apps	Goals
Atlético Madrid B	2024–25	Primera Federación	1	0	—		—		—		1	0
Atlético Madrid B	2025–26	Primera Federación	27	0	—		—		2	0	29	0
Atlético Madrid B	Total		28	0	—		—		2	0	30	0
Atlético Madrid	2025–26	La Liga	0	0	0	0	0	0	0	0	0	0
Atlético Madrid	2026–27	La Liga	0	0	0	0	0	0	0	0	0	0
Atlético Madrid	Total		0	0	0	0	0	0	0	0	0	0
Career total			28	0	0	0	0	0	2	0	30	0
