= Jorge Domínguez (footballer, born 2009) =

Spanish footballer (born 2009)

Personal information
- Full name: Jorge Domínguez Lituba
- Date of birth: 21 December 2009 (age 16)
- Place of birth: Madrid, Spain
- Height: 1.92 m (6 ft 4 in)
- Position: Centre-back

Team information
- Current team: Atlético Madrid B
- Number: 40

Youth career
- 2021–: Atlético Madrid

Senior career*
| Years | Team | Apps | (Gls) |
| 2026– | Atlético Madrid B | 1 | (0) |
| 2026– | Atlético Madrid | 1 | (0) |

International career^{‡}
| 2025– | Spain U17 | 8 | (1) |
- * Club domestic league appearances and goals as of 19 August 2026 ‡ National team caps and goals as of 23 April 2026

Jorge Domínguez Lituba (born 21 December 2009) is a Spanish professional footballer who plays as a centre-back for Atlético Madrileño.

== Early life ==
Born in Madrid to a Congolese mother from Brazzaville and a Spanish father, Domínguez joined Atlético Madrid's youth sides in 2021, aged ten.

== Club career ==
After impressing in the youth categories, Domínguez signed his first professional contract on 22 December 2025. He made his senior debut with the reserves on 10 April 2026, coming on as a late substitute for goalscorer Miguel Cubo in a 5–4 Primera Federación home win over Marbella FC.

After making the 2026 pre-season with the first team, Domínguez made his professional – and La Liga – debut on 19 August of that year, starting in a 2–0 home win over Málaga CF; aged 16 years and 241 days, he became Atleti's youngest debutant in the league.

== International career ==
Domínguez is a Spain youth international. During the spring of 2026, he played for the Spain national under-17 football team for 2026 UEFA European Under-17 Championship qualification.

== Style of play ==
Domínguez plays mainly as a centre-back. Spanish newspaper Diario AS wrote in 2026 that he "stands over 1.90 meters tall and knows how to use his body to his advantage in duels and physical battles".
