= Marc Pubill =

Spanish footballer (born 2003)

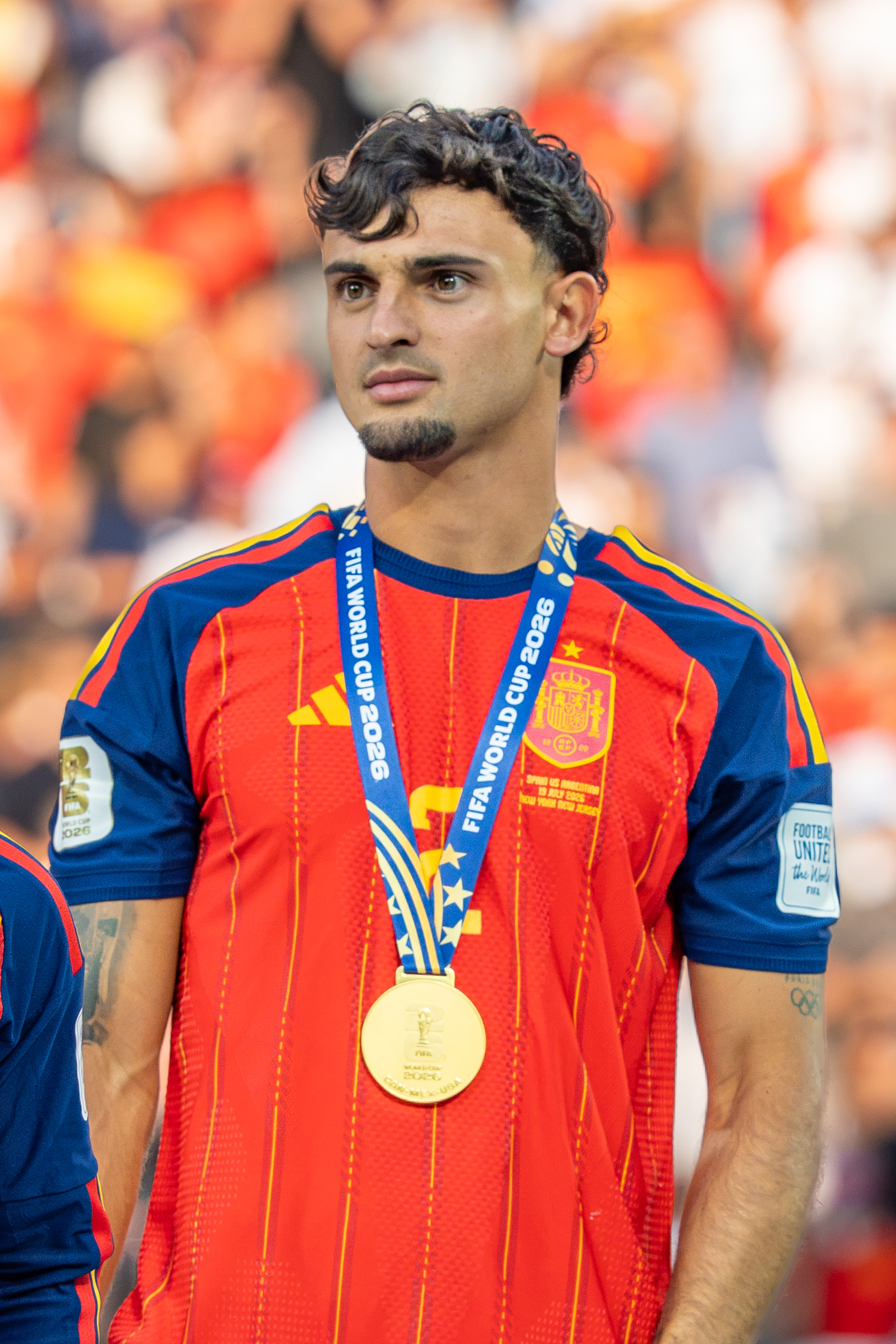
- Pubill with Spain in 2026

Personal information
- Full name: Marc Pubill Pagès
- Date of birth: 20 June 2003 (age 23)
- Place of birth: Terrassa, Spain
- Height: 1.90 m (6 ft 3 in)
- Position: Defender

Team information
- Current team: Atlético Madrid
- Number: 18

Youth career
- Manresa
- 2011–2017: Espanyol
- 2017–2020: Gimnàstic Manresa
- 2020–2021: Levante

Senior career*
Years	Team	Apps	(Gls)
2020–2022	Levante B	19	(1)
2021–2023	Levante	39	(1)
2023–2025	Almería	59	(2)
2025–	Atlético Madrid	29	(2)

International career^{‡}
2021	Spain U19	2	(0)
2024–2025	Spain U21	8	(1)
2024	Spain U23	5	(1)
2024–	Catalonia	1	(0)
2026–	Spain	8	(2)
Medal record
Men's football
Representing Spain
FIFA World Cup
Winner	2026 Canada–Mexico–US
Olympic Games
Gold medal – first place	2024 Paris	Team
- * Club domestic league appearances and goals as of 17:08, 8 November 2026 (UTC) ‡ National team caps and goals as of 22:05, 15 November 2026 (UTC)

Marc Pubill Pagès (born 20 June 2003) is a Spanish professional footballer who plays as a right-back or centre-back for La Liga club Atlético Madrid and the Spain national team.

== Club career ==
=== Levante ===
Born in Terrassa, Barcelona, Catalonia, Pubill represented CE Manresa, RCD Espanyol, Club Gimnàstic de Manresa and Levante UD as a youth. On 13 December 2020, while still a youth, he made his senior debut with the latter's reserves by playing the last 11 minutes of a 1–0 Segunda División B home loss against Hércules CF.

Pubill scored his first senior goal on 17 October 2021, netting the B's third in a 3–0 away win over the same opponent. On 3 December, he renewed his contract with the club until 2026.

Pubill made his first team – and La Liga – debut on 20 December 2021, starting in a 4–3 home loss against rivals Valencia CF. He scored his first professional goal on 5 February 2023, netting the opener in a 2–1 Segunda División away win over FC Cartagena.

=== Almería ===
On 9 August 2023, Pubill signed a six-year contract with UD Almería in the top tier. He scored his first La Liga goal in a 1–1 away draw with Granada on 18 February 2024. He was a regular starter during his first season at the club, suffering relegation.

=== Atlético Madrid ===
On 22 July 2025, Atlético Madrid announced that they had reached an agreement with Almería for the transfer of Pubill. He signed a five-year contract. He scored his first goal for the club in a 5–1 away defeat against Villarreal on the final matchday of the 2025–26 season.

== International career ==
Pubill represented Spain at under-19 level, receiving his first call-up to the side in October 2021.

He made his debut for the under-21 team in March 2024, featuring as a starter in a 2025 UEFA European Under-21 Championship qualification match against Belgium. In May 2025, he was included in the squad for the final tournament in Slovakia.

Pubill received a call-up to the Spain U23 team for the 2024 Summer Olympics in Paris. He scored the country's first goal in the Group C match against Uzbekistan. He later appeared as a starter in the gold medal match against the host, France, which Spain won 5–3 after extra time.

In May 2026, Pubill was named to Spain's squad for the 2026 FIFA World Cup. Spain went on to win the tournament, with Pubill's sole appearance coming as a stoppage time substitute in his side's 3–0 round of 32 victory against Austria.

== Career statistics ==
=== Club ===
As of match played 8 November 2026

Appearances and goals by club, season and competition
Club	Season	League			Copa del Rey		Europe		Other		Total	
Club	Season	Division	Apps	Goals	Apps	Goals	Apps	Goals	Apps	Goals	Apps	Goals
Atlético Levante	2020–21	Segunda División B	1	0	—		—		—		1	0
Atlético Levante	2021–22	Segunda División RFEF	18	1	—		—		—		18	1
Atlético Levante	Total		19	1	—		—		—		19	1
Levante	2021–22	La Liga	11	0	0	0	—		—		11	0
Levante	2022–23	Segunda División	28	1	3	1	—		—		31	2
Levante	Total		39	1	3	1	—		—		42	2
Almería	2023–24	La Liga	23	1	0	0	—		—		23	1
Almería	2024–25	Segunda División	36	1	4	0	—		—		40	1
Almería	Total		59	2	4	0	—		—		63	2
Atlético Madrid	2025–26	La Liga	19	1	5	0	11 (Note: Appearances in UEFA Champions League)	0	1 (Note: Appearance in Supercopa de España)	0	36	1
Atlético Madrid	2026–27	La Liga	10	1	0	0	4	0	0	0	14	1
Atlético Madrid	Total		29	2	5	0	15	0	1	0	50	2
Career total			146	6	12	1	15	0	1	0	174	7

=== International ===
As of match played 15 November 2026

Appearances and goals by national team and year
National team	Year	Apps	Goals
Spain	2026	8	2
Total		8	2

As of match played 12 November 2026
Spain score listed first, score column indicates score after each Pubill goal.

List of international goals scored by Marc Pubill
No.	Date	Venue	Cap	Opponent	Score	Result	Competition
1	29 September 2026	Ramón Sánchez-Pizjuán Stadium, Seville, Spain	5	Croatia	2–1	4–1	2026–27 UEFA Nations League A
2	12 November 2026	Fortuna Arena, Prague, Czech Republic	7	Czech Republic	2–0	2–0	2026–27 UEFA Nations League A

== Honours ==
Atlético Madrid

- Copa del Rey runner-up: 2025–26

Spain

- FIFA World Cup: 2026

Spain U23

- Summer Olympics gold medal: 2024
