= Robin Le Normand =

Footballer (born 1996)

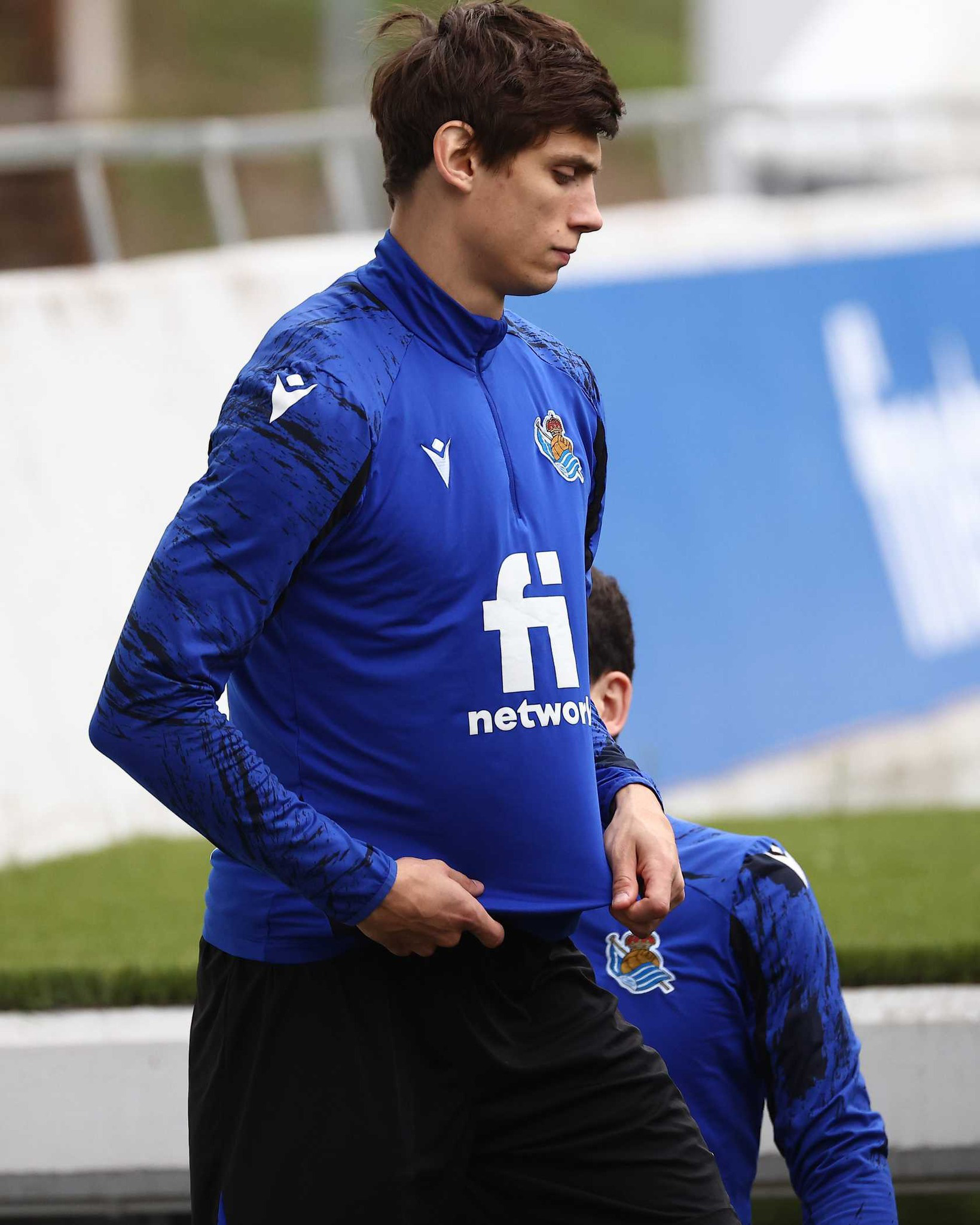
- Le Normand with Real Sociedad in 2022

Personal information
- Full name: Robin Aimé Robert Le Normand
- Date of birth: 11 November 1996 (age 30)
- Place of birth: Pabu, France
- Height: 1.87 m (6 ft 2 in)
- Position: Centre-back

Team information
- Current team: Atlético Madrid
- Number: 24

Youth career
- Brest

Senior career*
Years	Team	Apps	(Gls)
2013–2016	Brest II	39	(2)
2016	Brest	1	(0)
2016–2019	Real Sociedad B	82	(4)
2018–2024	Real Sociedad	167	(4)
2024–	Atlético Madrid	63	(3)

International career^{‡}
2023–	Spain	28	(1)
Medal record
Men's football
Representing Spain
UEFA European Championship
Winner	2024 Germany	Team
UEFA Nations League
Winner	2023 Netherlands	Team
Runner-up	2025 Germany	Team
- * Club domestic league appearances and goals as of 23:17, 22 November 2026 (UTC) ‡ National team caps and goals as of 22:40, 3 October 2026 (UTC)

Robin Aimé Robert Le Normand (born 11 November 1996) is a professional footballer who plays as a centre-back for La Liga club Atlético Madrid. Born in France, he plays for the Spain national team.

Le Normand started his professional career in France at Brest, where he made one first-team appearance, before joining Spanish side Real Sociedad in 2016. In 2024, he joined Atlético Madrid.

Le Normand obtained Spanish nationality in 2023, and was part of the Spain squads that won the 2023 UEFA Nations League and UEFA Euro 2024.

== Club career ==
=== Brest ===
Born in Pabu, Côtes-d'Armor, Le Normand represented Brest as a youth player. On 21 September 2013 he made his senior debut, starting with the reserve team in a 1–0 CFA 2 away loss against Lannion.

Le Normand scored his first senior goal on 19 March 2016, netting his team's third in a 3–3 draw at Fougères. On 15 April, he made his professional debut by starting in a 2–1 away loss against Sochaux for the Ligue 2. He was released at the end of the season.

=== Real Sociedad ===
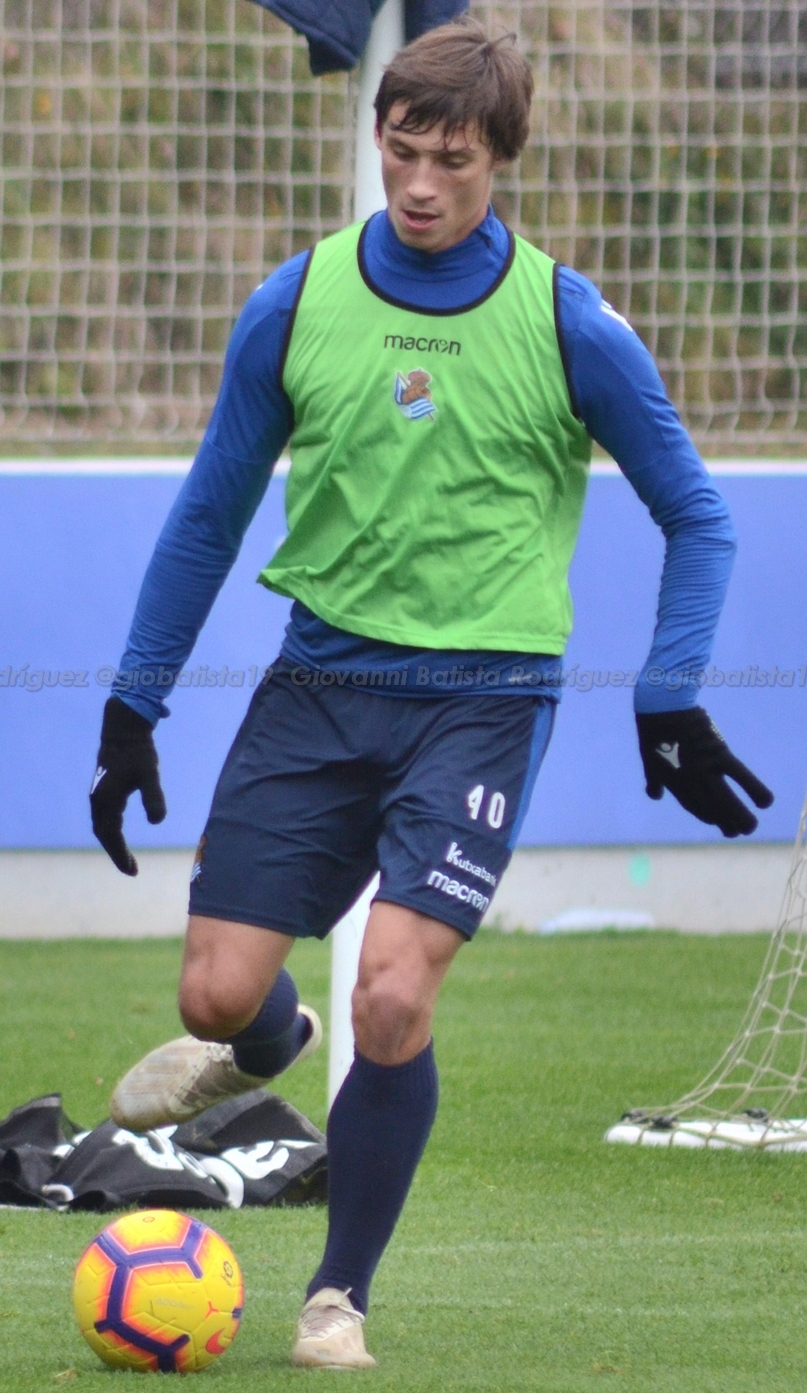
Le Normand training with Real Sociedad in 2018

On 5 July 2016, Le Normand signed a two-year deal with Real Sociedad, being assigned to the B-team in Segunda División B. He received a new contract in August 2018, for two more years.

Le Normand made his first team – and La Liga – debut on 26 November 2018, starting in a 2–1 home win against Celta Vigo. The following 12 February, he renewed his contract with the Txuri-urdin until 2022, and was definitely promoted to the main squad on 9 June.

After the departure of Héctor Moreno, Le Normand became an integral part of the starting XI. He scored his first La Liga goal on 30 November 2019, opening the scoring in a 4–1 home win against Eibar. He was rewarded with a contract extension until 2024 on 4 June 2020. On 19 December, he scored in an 8–0 win at Tercera División club Becerril in the first round of the Copa del Rey; he also played in the 1–0 win over Basque derby rivals Athletic Bilbao in the COVID-delayed final on 3 April 2021.

Le Normand was chosen as La Liga Player of the Month for October 2021, the first defender since Diego Godín of Atlético Madrid in 2014. He played 48 out of 51 games in 2021–22, missing only one league game by suspension, and then extended his contract until 2026.

=== Atlético Madrid ===
On 27 July 2024, Atlético Madrid announced an agreement with Real Sociedad for the signing of Le Normand. A week later, he signed a five-year contract. On 19 August, he made his debut for the club in a 2–2 draw against Villarreal in the league, and 18 May 2025, he scored his first goal for the club in a 4–1 win over Real Betis.

On 27 September 2025, Le Normand scored a header in a 5–2 win over rivals Real Madrid, their biggest derby win since November 1950. Three days later, he scored his first-ever UEFA Champions League goal in a 5–1 win against Eintracht Frankfurt.

== International career ==
In May 2023, the Spanish Council of Ministers granted Spanish nationality to Le Normand after living in Spain for almost seven years, meaning he would be eligible to play for the Spanish national team. On 2 June, he was included in their 23-man squad for the UEFA Nations League, debuting 13 days later in their 2–1 semi-final win over Italy, where he started in central defence alongside another naturalised Frenchman, Aymeric Laporte. On 18 June, he started in the final as Spain defeated Croatia in a penalty shootout to win their first Nations League title.

On 19 November 2023, Le Normand scored his first goal for Spain in their final UEFA Euro 2024 qualifier – a 3–1 win over Georgia.

In June 2024, Le Normand was named in Spain's squad for the UEFA Euro 2024 finals in Germany. He started the team's first group match, playing the full match in central defence as Spain beat Croatia 3–0 at Berlin's Olympiastadion. Spain won 2–1 against England in the final. He was not however part of the Spanish squad for the 2026 FIFA World Cup.

== Personal life ==
Le Normand's younger brother, Théo, is also a professional footballer, who made his debut for Guingamp in 2021. He also had a sister who died aged five.

== Career statistics ==
=== Club ===
As of match played 22 November 2026

Appearances and goals by club, season and competition
Club	Season	League			National cup (Note: Includes Copa del Rey)		Europe		Other		Total	
Club	Season	Division	Apps	Goals	Apps	Goals	Apps	Goals	Apps	Goals	Apps	Goals
Brest II	2013–14	CFA 2	7	0	—		—		—		7	0
Brest II	2014–15	CFA 2	13	0	—		—		—		13	0
Brest II	2015–16	CFA 2	19	2	—		—		—		19	2
Brest II	Total		39	2	—		—		—		39	2
Brest	2015–16	Ligue 2	1	0	0	0	—		0	0	1	0
Real Sociedad B	2016–17	Segunda División B	26	1	—		—		—		26	1
Real Sociedad B	2017–18	Segunda División B	38	2	—		—		—		38	2
Real Sociedad B	2018–19	Segunda División B	18	1	—		—		—		18	1
Real Sociedad B	Total		82	4	—		—		—		82	4
Real Sociedad	2018–19	La Liga	4	0	3	0	—		—		7	0
Real Sociedad	2019–20	La Liga	31	1	8 (Note: Includes appearance in 2020 Copa del Rey final (played in 2021))	1	—		—		39	2
Real Sociedad	2020–21	La Liga	33	0	2	0	7 (Note: Appearances in UEFA Europa League)	0	1 (Note: Appearance in Supercopa de España)	0	43	0
Real Sociedad	2021–22	La Liga	37	1	4	0	7	1	—		48	2
Real Sociedad	2022–23	La Liga	33	0	4	0	4	0	—		41	0
Real Sociedad	2023–24	La Liga	29	2	7	0	7 (Note: Appearances in UEFA Champions League)	0	—		43	2
Real Sociedad	Total		167	4	28	1	25	1	1	0	221	6
Atlético Madrid	2024–25	La Liga	27	1	5	0	5	0	3 (Note: Appearances in FIFA Club World Cup)	0	40	1
Atlético Madrid	2025–26	La Liga	28	1	3	0	14	2	1	0	46	3
Atlético Madrid	2026–27	La Liga	8	1	0	0	4	0	0	0	12	1
Atlético Madrid	Total		63	3	8	0	23	2	4	0	98	5
Career total			352	13	36	1	48	3	5	0	441	17

=== International ===
As of match played 3 October 2026

Appearances and goals by national team and year
National team	Year	Apps	Goals
Spain	2023	8	1
Spain	2024	11	0
Spain	2025	8	0
Spain	2026	1	0
Total		28	1

As of match played 14 October 2025
Spain score listed first, score column indicates score after each Le Normand goal.

List of international goals scored by Robin Le Normand
No.	Date	Venue	Cap	Opponent	Score	Result	Competition
1	19 November 2023	José Zorrilla, Valladolid, Spain	8	Georgia	1–0	3–1	UEFA Euro 2024 qualifying

== Honours ==
Real Sociedad

- Copa del Rey: 2019–20

Atlético Madrid

- Copa del Rey runner-up: 2025–26

Spain

- UEFA European Championship: 2024
- UEFA Nations League: 2022–23; runner-up: 2024–25

Individual

- La Liga Player of the Month: October 2021
