= Taufik Seidu =

Spanish footballer (born 2008)

Personal information
- Full name: Taufik Seidu Zanzi Awudu
- Date of birth: 20 January 2008 (age 18)
- Place of birth: Accra, Ghana
- Height: 1.82 m (6 ft 0 in)
- Position: Midfielder

Team information
- Current team: Atlético Madrid B
- Number: 27

Youth career
- Málaga
- 2018–: Atlético Madrid

Senior career*
Years	Team	Apps	(Gls)
2024–	Atlético Madrid B	2	(0)
2026–	Atlético Madrid	1	(0)

International career^{‡}
2023	Spain U15	4	(0)
2023–2024	Spain U16	5	(1)
2024–	Spain U17	9	(0)
- * Club domestic league appearances and goals as of 4 April 2026 ‡ National team caps and goals as of 15 June 2025

Taufik Seidu Zanzi Awudu (born 20 January 2008) is a footballer who plays as a midfielder for Atlético Madrileño. Born in Ghana, he is a youth international for Spain.

== Early life ==
Seidu was born in Accra, Ghana in 2008. He moved to Málaga, Spain, at a young age.

== Career ==
As a youth player, Seidu joined the youth academy of Spanish La Liga side Atlético Madrid. He captained the Spain national under-17 football team.

== Style of play ==
Seidu mainly operates as a midfielder. He has been described as a "midfielder with a strong stride and good ball handling".
