= Julio Díaz (footballer, born 2005) =

Spanish footballer (born 2005)

Personal information
- Full name: Julio Díaz del Romo
- Date of birth: 10 January 2005 (age 21)
- Place of birth: San Fernando de Henares, Spain
- Height: 1.70 m (5 ft 7 in)
- Position: Left-back

Team information
- Current team: Sevilla
- Number: 3

Youth career
- –2018: Rayo Vallecano
- 2018–2024: Atlético Madrid

Senior career*
Years	Team	Apps	(Gls)
2024–2026	Atlético Madrid B	56	(2)
2026	Atlético Madrid	4	(0)
2026–	Sevilla	0	(0)

International career
2022	Spain U18	5	(0)
2023–2024	Spain U19	12	(0)
2025	Spain U20	3	(0)
Medal record
Men's football
Representing Spain
UEFA European Under-19 Championship
Winner	2024 Northern Ireland
- * Club domestic league appearances and goals as of 23:04, 2 May 2026 (UTC)

Julio Díaz del Romo (born 10 January 2005) is a Spanish professional footballer who plays as a left-back for La Liga club Sevilla.

== Club career ==
=== Atlético Madrid ===
Born in San Fernando de Henares, Community of Madrid, Díaz is a product of the youth system of Atlético Madrid. He notably competed in the Youth League with the club's U19 team during the 2022-2023 season. He was voted second best player in the group stage during this competition.

On 26 January 2023, Díaz extended his contract with Atleti, keeping him tied to the club until June 2026. A regular with the Juvenil A team, he was instrumental in his team's title victory in the 2023-2024 season, being crowned champion of that category.

On 28 February 2026, Díaz made his official debut with the first team during the league match against Real Oviedo. He was part of the starting line-up and played 90 minutes.

=== Sevilla ===
On 28 July 2026, Sevilla announced the signing of Díaz on a five-year deal.

== International career ==
Díaz was called up to the Spanish U-19 national team to participate in the 2024 UEFA European Under-19 Championship. After beating Italy thanks to a goal from Pol Fortuny (0–1 after extra time), Spain reached the final of the tournament. He started in the final against France, against whom the Spanish won by 2 goals to nil, thus winning the tournament.

On 28 August 2025, Díaz was called up to the Spanish U-20 national team for the FIFA U-20 World Cup.

== Career statistics ==
=== Club ===
As of match played 2 May 2026

Appearances and goals by club, season and competition
Club	Season	League			Copa del Rey		Europe		Other		Total	
Club	Season	Division	Apps	Goals	Apps	Goals	Apps	Goals	Apps	Goals	Apps	Goals
Atlético Madrid B	2024–25	Primera Federación	32	2	—		—		—		32	2
Atlético Madrid B	2025–26	Primera Federación	24	0	—		—		—		24	0
Atlético Madrid B	Total		56	2	—		—		—		56	2
Atlético Madrid	2025–26	La Liga	4	0	0	0	0	0	0	0	4	0
Career total			60	2	0	0	0	0	0	0	60	2

== Honours ==
Atlético Madrid Juvenil

- División de Honor: 2024

Spain U19

- UEFA European Under-19 Championship: 2024
