= Miguel Cubo =

Spanish footballer (born 2008)

Personal information
- Full name: Miguel Llorente Cubo
- Date of birth: 8 February 2008 (age 18)
- Place of birth: Ortigosa del Monte, Spain
- Height: 1.84 m (6 ft 0 in)
- Position: Striker

Team information
- Current team: Atlético Madrid B
- Number: 18

Youth career
- Monteresma
- 2016–2025: Atlético Madrid

Senior career*
| Years | Team | Apps | (Gls) |
| 2025– | Atlético Madrid B | 33 | (5) |
| 2026– | Atlético Madrid | 2 | (1) |

International career^{‡}
| 2025–2026 | Spain U18 | 4 | (0) |
| 2026– | Spain U19 | 4 | (4) |
- * Club domestic league appearances and goals as of 25 May 2026 (UTC) ‡ National team caps and goals as of 20:15, 2 May 2026 (UTC)

Miguel Llorente Cubo (born 8 February 2008) is a Spanish professional footballer who plays as a striker for Primera Federación club Atlético Madrileño.

== Club career ==
Cubo joined the youth academy of Atlético Madrid in 2016 and worked his way up their youth categories, scoring 32 goals in 25 games for their B-youth side. On 22 February 2024, he signed his first professional contract with the club. He was promoted to their reserves, Atlético Madrileño, in the Primera Federación for the 2025–26 season. On 2 May 2026, he scored on his debut as a substitute with Atlético Madrid, a 2–0 La Liga win over Valencia.

== International career ==
Cubo is a youth international for Spain, having been called up to the Spain U19s in February 2026.
