= Ortigosa del Monte =

- Municipality
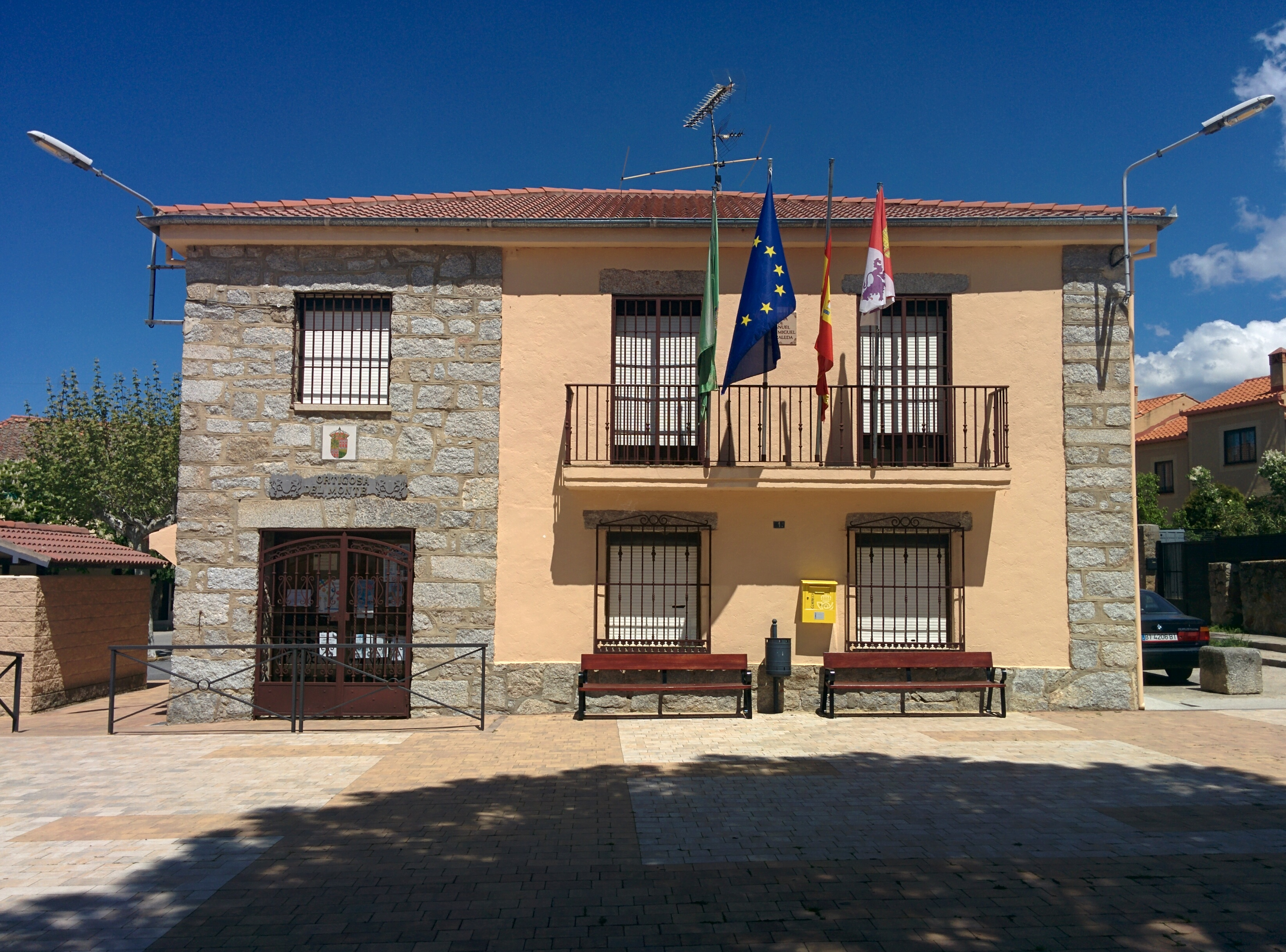

- Flag Coat of arms

- Location in Spain. Ortigosa del Monte (Spain)
- Coordinates: 40°50′35″N 4°10′35″W
- Country: Spain
- Autonomous community: Castile and León
- Province: Segovia
- Municipality: Ortigosa del Monte

Area
  - Total: 15.39 km^{2} (5.94 sq mi)
- Elevation: 1,094 m (3,589 ft)

Population (2025-01-01)
  - Total: 608
  - Density: 39.5/km^{2} (102/sq mi)
- Time zone: UTC+1 (CET)
  - Summer (DST): UTC+2 (CEST)
- Website: Official website

Ortigosa del Monte is a municipality located in the province of Segovia, Castile and León, Spain. According to the 2004 census (INE), the municipality has a population of 430 inhabitants.
