= Pablo Barrios (footballer) =

Spanish footballer (born 2003)

Personal information
- Full name: Pablo Barrios Rivas
- Date of birth: 15 June 2003 (age 23)
- Place of birth: Madrid, Spain
- Height: 1.83 m (6 ft 0 in)
- Position: Midfielder

Team information
- Current team: Atlético Madrid
- Number: 8

Youth career
- 2008–2011: Moratalaz
- 2011–2017: Real Madrid
- 2017–2022: Atlético Madrid

Senior career*
Years	Team	Apps	(Gls)
2022	Atlético Madrid B	12	(1)
2022–	Atlético Madrid	109	(2)

International career^{‡}
2022	Spain U19	3	(0)
2023–2024	Spain U21	8	(0)
2024	Spain U23	6	(0)
2024–	Spain	4	(0)
Medal record
Men's football
Representing Spain
Olympic Games
Gold medal – first place	2024 Paris
- * Club domestic league appearances and goals as of 17:16, 22 November 2026 (UTC) ‡ National team caps and goals as of 19:00, 15 November 2025 (UTC)

Pablo Barrios Rivas (born 15 June 2003) is a Spanish professional footballer who plays as a midfielder for La Liga club Atlético Madrid and the Spain national team.

== Club career ==
Barrios began his youth career in Real Madrid before moving to their city rivals, Atlético Madrid, in 2017. He became a central part of the club's under-19 team in the 2021–22 season, which reached the semi-finals in the UEFA Youth League for the first time in the club's history.

On 3 March 2022, Barrios signed his first professional contract with Atleti, keeping him until 2025. In the 2022–23 season, he advanced to playing for the reserve team, but was soon called up to the first team, making his professional La Liga debut on 29 October as a second half substitute to Geoffrey Kondogbia in a 3–2 away loss against Cádiz CF.

Barrios scored his first goal for Atleti on 22 December 2022, netting his team's second in a 3–1 away victory against CD Arenteiro, for the season's Copa del Rey. His first professional goal came on 4 January 2023, as he scored the second of Atlético's 2–0 victory at Oviedo in the same tournament.

On 25 January 2023, Barrios renewed his contract until 2028, and was officially promoted to the main squad, being assigned the number 24 jersey. After the departure of fellow Atleti youth product Saúl in the 2024–25 season, he was given his number 8 jersey, and further consolidated his position as a starter in Diego Simeone's squad.

== International career ==
Barrios is a youth international for Spain, having debuted for the under-19 team in 2022. He was also a member of the Spain under-23 squad that won a gold medal in football at the 2024 Paris Summer Olympics. Due to injuries of Martín Zubimendi and Álex Baena, Barrios received his first senior international call-up in November 2024 for a 2024–25 UEFA Nations League A match against Switzerland, debuting on 18 November in the same match.

== Career statistics ==
=== Club ===
As of match played 22 November 2026

Appearances and goals by club, season and competition
Club	Season	League			Copa del Rey		Europe		Other		Total	
Club	Season	Division	Apps	Goals	Apps	Goals	Apps	Goals	Apps	Goals	Apps	Goals
Atlético Madrid B	2022–23	Segunda Federación	12	1	—		—		—		12	1
Atlético Madrid	2022–23	La Liga	21	0	4	2	1 (Note: Appearance(s) in UEFA Champions League)	0	—		26	2
Atlético Madrid	2023–24	La Liga	24	0	4	0	7	1	0	0	35	1
Atlético Madrid	2024–25	La Liga	31	1	4	0	6	0	3 (Note: Appearances in FIFA Club World Cup)	2	44	3
Atlético Madrid	2025–26	La Liga	23	1	3	0	9	0	0	0	35	1
Atlético Madrid	2026–27	La Liga	10	0	0	0	4	1	0	0	14	1
Atlético Madrid	Total		109	2	15	2	27	2	3	2	154	8
Career total			121	3	15	2	27	2	3	2	166	9

=== International ===
As of match played 15 November 2025

Appearances and goals by national team and year
National team	Year	Apps	Goals
Spain	2024	1	0
Spain	2025	3	0
Total		4	0

== Honours ==
Spain U23

- Summer Olympics gold medal: 2024

Atlético Madrid

- Copa del Rey runner-up: 2025–26
