= Matteo Ruggeri =

Italian footballer (born 2002)

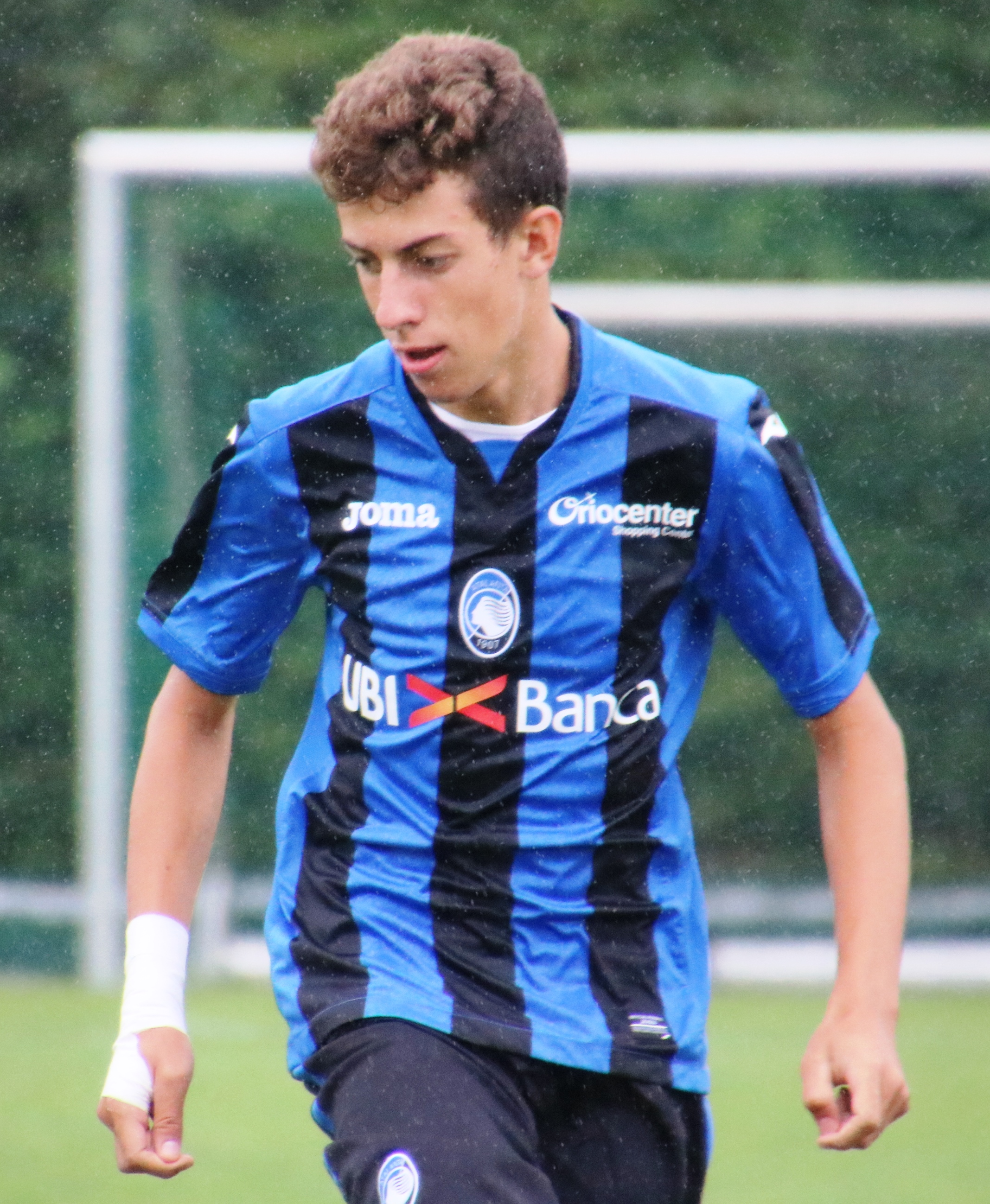
- Ruggeri with Atalanta in 2017

Personal information
- Full name: Matteo Ruggeri
- Date of birth: 11 July 2002 (age 24)
- Place of birth: San Giovanni Bianco, Italy
- Height: 1.87 m (6 ft 2 in)
- Position: Left-back

Team information
- Current team: Aston Villa
- Number: 13

Youth career
- 2011–2020: Atalanta

Senior career*
| Years | Team | Apps | (Gls) |
| 2020–2025 | Atalanta | 85 | (0) |
| 2021–2022 | → Salernitana (loan) | 14 | (0) |
| 2025–2026 | Atlético Madrid | 26 | (0) |
| 2026– | Aston Villa | 4 | (0) |

International career^{‡}
| 2018–2019 | Italy U17 | 16 | (0) |
| 2019–2020 | Italy U18 | 9 | (0) |
| 2020 | Italy U19 | 1 | (0) |
| 2021–2022 | Italy U20 | 3 | (0) |
| 2022–2025 | Italy U21 | 16 | (0) |
| 2026– | Italy | 2 | (0) |
Medal record
Men's football
Representing Italy
UEFA European Under-17 Championship
| Runner-up | 2019 Ireland |
- * Club domestic league appearances and goals as of 20:42, 10 October 2026 (UTC) ‡ National team caps and goals as of 5 October 2026

Matteo Ruggeri (Italian pronunciation: [matˈtɛ.o rudˈd͡ʒɛ.ri]; born 11 July 2002) is an Italian professional footballer who plays as a left-back for Premier League club Aston Villa and the Italy national team.

A product of the Atalanta academy, Ruggeri went on to make over 100 appearances for the club. He won the 2023–24 UEFA Europa League, where he was named in the 2023–24 Europa League Team of the Season. Ruggeri transferred to Atlético Madrid in July 2025, followed by Aston Villa in 2026.

Ruggeri has played for Italy at multiple youth team levels, including Italy under-21. He was called into the senior Italy squad for the first time in March 2025, and made his debut in September 2026.

== Club career ==
=== Atalanta ===
Ruggeri grew up in Zogno, Lombardy, Italy, where he started playing football before joining Atalanta's youth sector in 2011. He made his professional debut for Atalanta on 3 November 2020, coming on as a substitute in the 81st minute in a UEFA Champions League group stage match against Liverpool, which Atalanta lost 5–0 at home. Five days later, Ruggeri made his Serie A debut in a 1–1 home draw against Inter.

On 27 July 2021, Ruggeri joined newly-promoted Serie A club Salernitana on a season-long loan. On 22 May 2024, he started in Atalanta's 3–0 victory over German champions Bayer Leverkusen in the 2024 UEFA Europa League final.

=== Playing abroad ===
On 1 July 2025, Ruggeri joined La Liga club Atlético Madrid, signing a five-year contract. On 19 August 2026, he signed for Premier League club Aston Villa for an undisclosed transfer fee, reported to be around £17 million.

== International career ==
In March 2025, following regular appearances at multiple youth team levels, he was called up to the senior Italy squad for the 2024–25 UEFA Nations League quarter-final matches against Germany on 20 and 23 March 2025.

For the 2026–27 UEFA Nations League matches against Belgium, Turkey, and France in 2026, Ruggeri was called up with the Italy national team by head coach Roberto Mancini to replace the injured Federico Dimarco. He made his international debut on 28 September 2026, starting a 4–1 victory over Turkey.

== Career statistics ==
=== Club ===
As of match played 10 October 2026

Appearances and goals by club, season and competition
| Club | Season | League | | | National cup (Note: Includes Coppa Italia, Copa del Rey) | | League cup (Note: Includes EFL Cup) | | Europe | | Other | | Total | |
| Club | Season | Division | Apps | Goals | Apps | Goals | Apps | Goals | Apps | Goals | Apps | Goals | Apps | Goals |
|---|---|---|---|---|---|---|---|---|---|---|---|---|---|---|
| Atalanta | 2020–21 | Serie A | 6 | 0 | 0 | 0 | — | | 2 (Note: Appearances in UEFA Champions League) | 0 | — | | 8 | 0 |
| Atalanta | 2022–23 | Serie A | 15 | 0 | 0 | 0 | — | | — | | — | | 15 | 0 |
| Atalanta | 2023–24 | Serie A | 34 | 0 | 4 | 0 | — | | 10 (Note: Appearances in UEFA Europa League) | 2 | — | | 48 | 2 |
| Atalanta | 2024–25 | Serie A | 30 | 0 | 0 | 0 | — | | 6 | 0 | 2 (Note: One appearance in UEFA Super Cup, one appearance in Supercoppa Italiana) | 0 | 38 | 0 |
| Atalanta | Total | | 85 | 0 | 4 | 0 | — | | 18 | 2 | 2 | 0 | 109 | 2 |
| Salernitana (loan) | 2021–22 | Serie A | 14 | 0 | 1 | 0 | — | | — | | — | | 15 | 0 |
| Atlético Madrid | 2025–26 | La Liga | 26 | 0 | 5 | 0 | — | | 15 | 0 | 1 (Note: Appearance in Supercopa de España) | 0 | 47 | 0 |
| Aston Villa | 2026–27 | Premier League | 4 | 0 | 0 | 0 | 1 | 0 | 0 | 0 | — | | 5 | 0 |
| Career total | | | 129 | 0 | 10 | 0 | 1 | 0 | 33 | 2 | 3 | 0 | 176 | 2 |

=== International ===
As of match played 5 October 2026

Appearances and goals by national team and year
| National team | Year | Apps | Goals |
|---|---|---|---|
| Italy | 2026 | 2 | 0 |
| Total | | 2 | 0 |

== Honours ==
Atalanta

- UEFA Europa League: 2023–24
- Coppa Italia runner-up: 2020–21, 2023–24

Atlético Madrid

- Copa del Rey runner-up: 2025–26

Individual

- UEFA Europa League Team of the Season: 2023–24
