= Javier Boñar =

Spanish footballer (born 2005)

Personal information
- Full name: Javier Boñar Franco
- Date of birth: 3 June 2005 (age 21)
- Place of birth: Madrid, Spain
- Height: 1.78 m (5 ft 10 in)
- Position: Right-back

Team information
- Current team: Girona
- Number: 4

Youth career
- Metropolitano
- 2013–2022: Atlético Madrid

Senior career*
Years	Team	Apps	(Gls)
2022–2026	Atlético Madrid B	105	(8)
2026	Atlético Madrid	4	(1)
2026–	Girona	8	(0)

International career^{‡}
2019–2020	Spain U15	6	(1)
2021–2022	Spain U17	10	(3)
2022–2023	Spain U18	7	(4)
2023–	Spain U19	5	(0)
- * Club domestic league appearances and goals as of 22:11, 18 October 2026 (UTC) ‡ National team caps and goals as of 04:32, 8 March 2024 (UTC)

Javier Boñar Franco (born 3 June 2005) is a Spanish professional footballer who plays as a right-back for Girona FC.

== Club career ==
=== Atlético Madrid ===
Born in Madrid, Boñar started his career as a midfielder with local side Club Deportivo Metropolitano, listing former Brazilian international Kaká as one of his idols growing up. After moving to Atlético de Madrid in 2013, he transitioned to a central defender, and took to his new position well - playing at a youth level higher than his peers.

For the 2022–23 season, Boñar was promoted to Atlético's B-team, making his debut in a 4–2 Segunda Federación win against Atlético Paso on 30 October 2022. On 3 July 2025, he renewed his contract until 2028.

Boñar made his first team – and La Liga – debut with Atleti on 11 April 2026, starting and scoring the team's only goal in a 2–1 away loss to Sevilla.

=== Girona ===
On 27 August 2026, Boñar was announced at Segunda División side Girona on a four-year deal.

== International career ==
Boñar has represented Spain at youth international level.

== Career statistics ==
=== Club ===
As of match played 18 October 2026

Appearances and goals by club, season and competition
Club	Season	League			Copa del Rey		Europe		Other		Total	
Club	Season	Division	Apps	Goals	Apps	Goals	Apps	Goals	Apps	Goals	Apps	Goals
Atlético Madrid B	2022–23	Segunda Federación	11	0	—		—		4 (Note: Appearances in Segunda Federación play-offs)	1	15	1
Atlético Madrid B	2023–24	Primera Federación	28	0	—		—		—		28	0
Atlético Madrid B	2024–25	Primera Federación	33	4	—		—		—		33	4
Atlético Madrid B	2025–26	Primera Federación	33	4	—		—		—		33	4
Atlético Madrid B	Total		105	8	—		—		4	1	109	9
Atlético Madrid	2025–26	La Liga	4	1	0	0	0	0	0	0	4	1
Girona	2026–27	Segunda División	8	0	0	0	—		—		8	0
Career total			117	9	0	0	0	0	4	1	121	10

== Honours ==
Atlético Madrid

- Copa del Rey runner-up: 2025–26
