= Juan Musso =

Argentine footballer (born 1994)

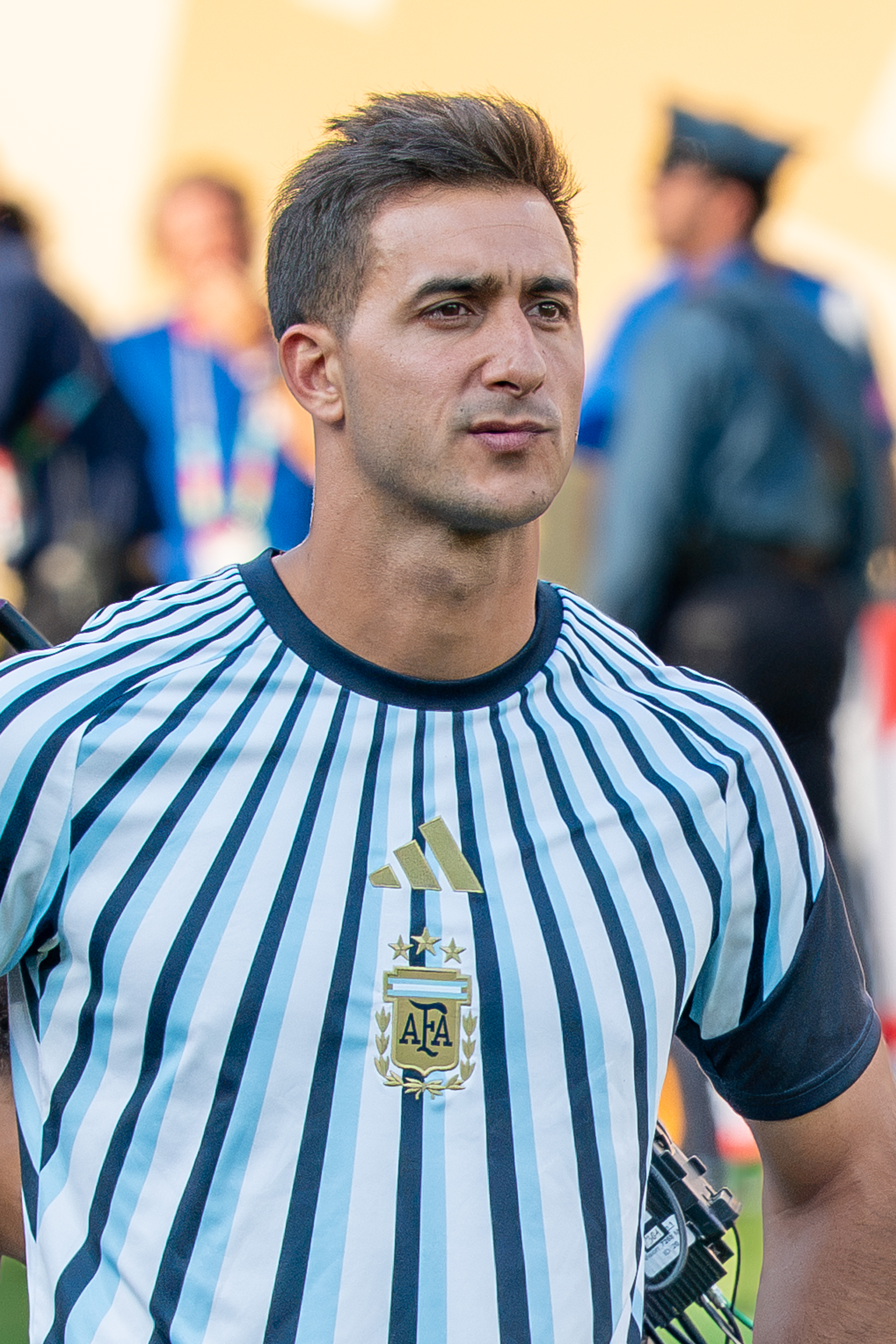
- Musso with Argentina in 2026

Personal information
- Full name: Juan Agustín Musso
- Date of birth: 6 May 1994 (age 32)
- Place of birth: San Nicolás, Argentina
- Height: 1.93 m (6 ft 4 in)
- Position: Goalkeeper

Team information
- Current team: Atlético Madrid
- Number: 1

Youth career
- Racing Club

Senior career*
| Years | Team | Apps | (Gls) |
| 2016–2018 | Racing Club | 23 | (0) |
| 2018–2021 | Udinese | 102 | (0) |
| 2021–2025 | Atalanta | 69 | (0) |
| 2024–2025 | → Atlético Madrid (loan) | 2 | (0) |
| 2025– | Atlético Madrid | 8 | (0) |

International career^{‡}
| 2012 | Argentina U20 | 1 | (0) |
| 2019– | Argentina | 4 | (0) |
Medal record
Men's football
Representing Argentina
FIFA World Cup
| Runner-up | 2026 Canada–Mexico–US |
Copa América
| Winner | 2021 Brazil |
CONMEBOL–UEFA Cup of Champions
| Winner | 2022 England |
- * Club domestic league appearances and goals as of 23:30, 24 May 2026 (UTC) ‡ National team caps and goals as of 7 June 2026 (UTC)

Juan Agustín Musso (born 6 May 1994) is an Argentine professional footballer who plays as a goalkeeper for La Liga club Atlético Madrid and the Argentina national team.

== Club career ==
Musso trained at the academy of Club de Regatas San Nicolas, before going on loan to Defensores de Belgrano de Villa Ramallo, with which he won the local championship at the age of 16. In the final, he saved three out of five penalties in the shoot-out.

=== Racing Club ===
Musso was the third-choice goalkeeper during Racing Club's 2014 Argentine Primera División championship, the team's first title in 13 years. He made his professional debut three years later, on 28 May 2017, in a 2–1 home win against San Lorenzo. Musso became the team's first-choice goalkeeper during the 2017–18 Argentine Primera División, in which Racing finished in 7th place and qualified for the 2019 Copa Sudamericana.

=== Udinese ===
In the summer of 2018, Musso was signed by Serie A side Udinese. Throughout the season, he established himself as the undisputed starter and became one of the team's key players. In three seasons, Musso accumulated a total of 102 appearances in the league.

=== Atalanta ===
On 2 July 2021, Musso was signed by Atalanta. On 22 May 2024, he clinched his first trophy with the club as Atalanta defeated Bayer Leverkusen to win the UEFA Europa League.

=== Atlético Madrid ===
On 27 August 2024, Musso joined La Liga club Atlético Madrid on a season-long loan for the 2024–25 season.

On 10 June 2025, Atlético Madrid made the transfer permanent and signed a three-season contract with Musso.

== International career ==
Musso was born in Argentina and is of Italian descent, holding both passports. He was part of the Argentina U20 national team's squad for the 2013 South American Youth Football Championship.

On 26 March 2019, Musso debuted for the Argentine senior squad in a friendly match against Morocco, coming as a 67th-minute substitute for Esteban Andrada. The same year on 14 June, Musso received a late call-up for the 2019 Copa América to replace the injured Andrada.

On 27 May 2026, Musso was selected in the 26-man squad for the 2026 FIFA World Cup.

== Career statistics ==
=== Club ===
As of match played 24 May 2026

Appearances and goals by club, season and competition
| Club | Season | League | | | National cup | | Continental | | Other | | Total | |
| Club | Season | Division | Apps | Goals | Apps | Goals | Apps | Goals | Apps | Goals | Apps | Goals |
|---|---|---|---|---|---|---|---|---|---|---|---|---|
| Racing | 2016–17 | Argentine Primera División | 1 | 0 | 2 | 0 | 5 (Note: Appearances in Copa Sudamericana) | 0 | — | | 8 | 0 |
| Racing | 2017–18 | Argentine Primera División | 22 | 0 | 0 | 0 | 6 | 0 | — | | 28 | 0 |
| Racing | Total | | 23 | 0 | 2 | 0 | 11 | 0 | — | | 36 | 0 |
| Udinese | 2018–19 | Serie A | 29 | 0 | 0 | 0 | — | | — | | 29 | 0 |
| Udinese | 2019–20 | Serie A | 38 | 0 | 1 | 0 | — | | — | | 39 | 0 |
| Udinese | 2020–21 | Serie A | 35 | 0 | 1 | 0 | — | | — | | 36 | 0 |
| Udinese | Total | | 102 | 0 | 2 | 0 | — | | — | | 104 | 0 |
| Atalanta | 2021–22 | Serie A | 33 | 0 | 2 | 0 | 12 (Note: Six appearances in UEFA Champions League, six appearances in UEFA Europa League) | 0 | — | | 47 | 0 |
| Atalanta | 2022–23 | Serie A | 24 | 0 | 2 | 0 | — | | — | | 26 | 0 |
| Atalanta | 2023–24 | Serie A | 11 | 0 | 1 | 0 | 12 (Note: Appearances in UEFA Europa League) | 0 | — | | 24 | 0 |
| Atalanta | 2024–25 | Serie A | 1 | 0 | — | | — | | 1 (Note: Appearance in UEFA Super Cup) | 0 | 2 | 0 |
| Atalanta | Total | | 69 | 0 | 5 | 0 | 24 | 0 | 1 | 0 | 99 | 0 |
| Atlético Madrid (loan) | 2024–25 | La Liga | 2 | 0 | 7 | 0 | 0 | 0 | 0 | 0 | 9 | 0 |
| Atlético Madrid | 2025–26 | La Liga | 8 | 0 | 6 | 0 | 4 (Note: Appearances in UEFA Champions League) | 0 | 0 | 0 | 18 | 0 |
| Atlético Madrid | Atlético total | | 10 | 0 | 13 | 0 | 4 | 0 | 0 | 0 | 27 | 0 |
| Career total | | | 204 | 0 | 22 | 0 | 39 | 0 | 1 | 0 | 266 | 0 |

=== International ===
As of match played 6 June 2026

Appearances and goals by national team and year
| National team | Year | Apps | Goals |
|---|---|---|---|
| Argentina | 2019 | 1 | 0 |
| Argentina | 2021 | 1 | 0 |
| Argentina | 2026 | 2 | 0 |
| Total | | 4 | 0 |

== Honours ==
Atalanta

- UEFA Europa League: 2023–24
- Coppa Italia runner-up: 2023–24

Atlético Madrid

- Copa del Rey runner-up: 2025–26

Argentina

- Copa América: 2021
- FIFA World Cup runner-up: 2026
