= Javi Morcillo =

Spanish footballer (born 2006)

Personal information
- Full name: Javier Morcillo Rodrigálvarez
- Date of birth: 15 March 2006 (age 20)
- Place of birth: Barcelona, Spain
- Height: 1.83 m (6 ft 0 in)
- Position: Midfielder

Team information
- Current team: Elche

Youth career
- Fundación Marcet
- 2021–2024: Sabadell

Senior career*
Years	Team	Apps	(Gls)
2024	Sabadell B	2	(0)
2024–2025	Sabadell	25	(2)
2025–2026	Atlético Madrid B	27	(0)
2026	Atlético Madrid	5	(0)
2026–	Elche	0	(0)
- * Club domestic league appearances and goals as of 24 May 2026

Javier "Javi" Morcillo Rodrigálvez (born 15 March 2006) is a Spanish professional footballer who plays as a midfielder for LaLiga club Elche.

== Career ==
Born in Barcelona, Catalonia, Morcillo joined CE Sabadell FC's youth sides in 2021, from Fundación Marcet. On 14 April 2024, while still a youth, he made his first team debut by coming on as a second-half substitute in a 2–0 Primera Federación away loss to CA Osasuna B.

On 23 April 2024, Morcillo renewed with the Arlequinats until 2027. Initially assigned to the reserves in Tercera Federación for the 2024–25 season, he soon became a starter with the main squad in Segunda Federación.

On 19 June 2025, Atlético Madrid reached an agreement with Sabadell for the transfer of Morcillo, who agreed to a three-year contract and was assigned to the B-team in the third division. He made his professional – and La Liga – debut the following 4 April, replacing Antoine Griezmann in a 2–1 home loss to FC Barcelona.

On 6 August 2026, Morcillo joined Elche CF in the top tier on a four-year contract.
