= Iker Luque =

Spanish footballer (born 2005)

Personal information
- Full name: Iker Luque Sierra
- Date of birth: 5 June 2005 (age 21)
- Place of birth: Madrid, Spain
- Height: 1.68 m (5 ft 6 in)
- Position: Winger

Team information
- Current team: Racing Santander

Youth career
- 2013–2014: Vallecas
- 2014–2024: Atlético Madrid

Senior career*
| Years | Team | Apps | (Gls) |
| 2024–2026 | Atlético Madrid B | 62 | (5) |
| 2026 | Atlético Madrid | 1 | (1) |
| 2026– | Racing Santander | 0 | (0) |
- * Club domestic league appearances and goals as of 25 May 2026 ‡ National team caps and goals as of 20:05, 21 April 2026 (UTC)

Iker Luque Sierra (born 5 June 2005) is a Spanish professional footballer who plays as a winger for Racing de Santander.

== Club career ==
Cubo joined the youth academy of Atlético Madrid in 2014 from Vallecas and worked his way up their youth categories. On 28 June 2023, he signed his first professional contract with the club until 2025. On 9 July 2024, he extended his contract until 2027 and was promoted to their reserves, Atlético Madrileño, in the Primera Federación for the 2024–25 season. On 18 December 2025, he extended his contract with the club until 2028. On 2 May 2026, he scored on his debut as a substitute with Atlético Madrid, a 2–0 La Liga win over Valencia.

On 31 August 2026, Luque signed a four-year contract with Racing de Santander also in the top tier.
