= Sequeira (disambiguation) =

Sequeira may refer to:

== Places ==
- Sequeira, Braga, Portugal
- Sequeira, Uruguay

== People ==
- Aarti Sequeira (born 1978), Indian chef and TV host
- Adélia Sequeira, Portuguese mathematician
- Aleixo Sequeira
- Alejandro Sequeira (born 1975), Costa Rican footballer
- Bárbara da Silva Sequeira (born 1996), Portuguese gymnast
- Bemvindo Sequeira (born 1947), Brazilian actor
- Bridget Sequeira (1905–1987), Indian Christian missionary
- Christopher Sequeira, Australian filmmaker
- Denzil Sequeira (born 1990), Indian-born Botswanan cricketer
- Diogo Lopes de Sequeira (1465–1530), Portuguese explorer
- Domingos Sequeira (1768–1837), Portuguese painter
- Douglas Sequeira (born 1977), Costa Rican footballer
- Edward Sequeira (born 1940), Indian athlete
- Erasmo de Sequeira (born 1997), Indian politician
- Germán Sequeira (1884–1951), Nicaraguan politician
- Gomes de Sequeira, 16th-century Portuguese explorer
- Horacio Sequeira (born 1995), Uruguayan footballer
- Isaac de Sequeira Samuda (1681–1729), British physician
- Isaac Henrique Sequeira (1738-1816), Portuguese physician
- Jack de Sequeira (1915–1989), Indian politician
- João Félix Sequeira (born 1999), Portuguese footballer
- Joel Sequeira (born 1988), Indian footballer
- Juanito Sequeira (born 1982), Dutch footballer
- Keith Sequeira (born 1983), Indian actor
- Luís Lopes de Sequeira (died 1681), Portuguese military commander
- Marlon Sequeira (born 1989), Canadian soccer player
- Maria de Fátima Silva de Sequeira Dias (1958–2013), Portuguese historian
- Mary D'Souza Sequeira, Indian athlete
- Naomi Sequeira (born 1994), Australian actress
- Stephanie Sequeira (born 1993), American bodybuilder
- Sequeira Costa (1929–2019), Portuguese pianist
- Valdir Sequeira (born 1981), Portuguese volleyball player
