= Aguilera (surname) =

Aguilera is a Spanish surname.

The name is related to Latin Aquilaria (eagles lair). Surnames with similar spellings are Aguilar, Aguiler, Aguiar, Aquilar, etc.

Aguilera may refer to the following people:

- Aaron Aguilera, American professional wrestler
- Ada Santana Aguilera (born 1998), Spanish politician
- Alberto Aguilera, Mexican singer better known as "Juan Gabriel"
- Ana María Aguilera, Spanish statistician
- Antonio Guzmán Aguilera (1894–1958), Mexican screenwriter
- Brandon Aguilera (born 2003), Costa Rican footballer
- Carlos Aguilera, Uruguayan former footballer
- Carolina Aguilera, Chilean journalist
- Christina Aguilera (born 1980), American pop/R&B singer-songwriter
- Dave Aguilera, guitarist for Bleed the Dream
- Diego Marín Aguilera (died 1799), Spanish inventor
- Diego de Aguilar, Spanish Renaissance painter
- Edward Aguilera (born 1976), Spanish singer
- Francisco Vicente Aguilera (1821–1877), Cuban patriot
- Germán Sequeira Aguilera (1884–1951), Nicaraguan politician
- Ian Aguilera (born 2007), Mexican racing driver
- Jaime Roldós Aguilera (1940–1981), President of Ecuador
- Jorge Aguilera (born 1966), Cuban sprinter
- José Aguilera Bernabé, Spanish chess player
- Juan Aguilera (disambiguation), several people
- Marián Aguilera (born 1977), Spanish film/television actress
- Rick Aguilera (born 1961), American baseball player
- Ventura Ruiz Aguilera (1820–1881), Spanish poet
