= João Félix =

Portuguese footballer (born 1999)

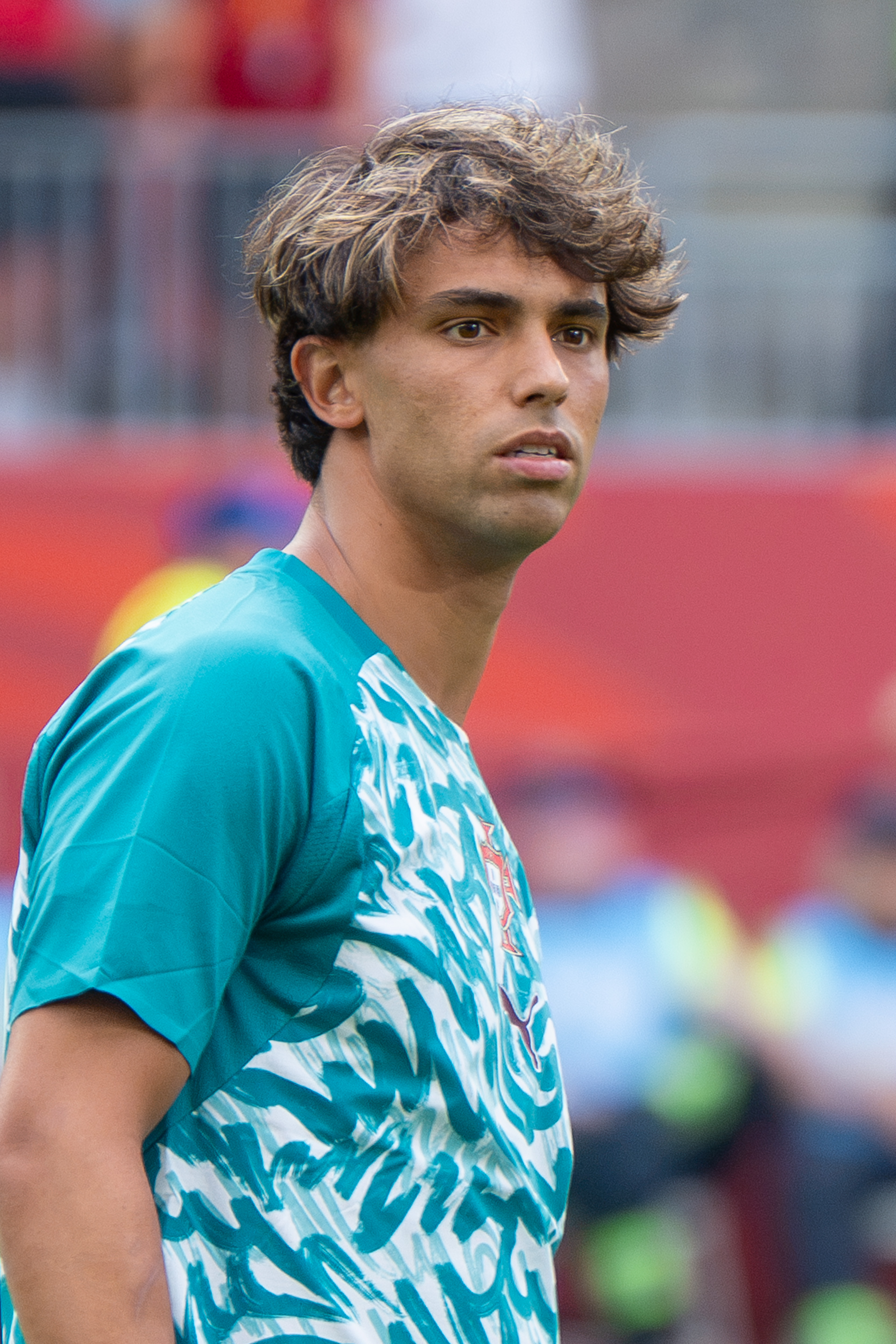
- Félix with Portugal in 2026

Personal information
- Full name: João Félix Sequeira
- Date of birth: 10 November 1999 (age 27)
- Place of birth: Viseu, Portugal
- Height: 1.81 m (5 ft 11 in)
- Positions: Attacking midfielder; forward

Team information
- Current team: Al-Nassr
- Number: 79

Youth career
- 2007–2008: Os Pestinhas
- 2008–2015: Porto
- 2014–2015: → Padroense (loan)
- 2015–2016: Benfica

Senior career*
Years	Team	Apps	(Gls)
2016–2018	Benfica B	30	(7)
2018–2019	Benfica	26	(15)
2019–2024	Atlético Madrid	96	(25)
2023	→ Chelsea (loan)	16	(4)
2023–2024	→ Barcelona (loan)	30	(7)
2024–2025	Chelsea	12	(1)
2025	→ AC Milan (loan)	15	(2)
2025–	Al-Nassr	44	(23)

International career^{‡}
2017	Portugal U18	2	(2)
2018	Portugal U19	2	(0)
2017–2018	Portugal U21	10	(4)
2019–	Portugal	63	(15)
Medal record
Men's football
Representing Portugal
UEFA Nations League
Winner	2019 Portugal
Winner	2025 Germany
- * Club domestic league appearances and goals as of 20:53, 20 November 2026 (UTC) ‡ National team caps and goals as of 23:08, 17 November 2026 (UTC)

João Félix Sequeira (/ˈʒwaʊn ˈfɛlɪks/ ZHWOWN FEH-liks; Portuguese pronunciation: [ʒuˈɐ̃w ˈfɛliks]; (Note: Félix himself pronounces this name as [ˈfɛliks], but this name is also pronounced [ˈfɛliʃ].) born 10 November 1999) is a Portuguese professional footballer who plays as an attacking midfielder or forward for Saudi Pro League club Al-Nassr and the Portugal national team.

Félix initially trained at Porto's youth academy, before moving to rivals Benfica in 2015. He began playing for the latter's reserve team a year later and was promoted to the first team in 2018, making his debut at age 17. He helped Benfica win the league title in his first and only season with them. In 2019, at age 19, Félix signed with Atlético Madrid for a club-record transfer worth €126 million (£113 million), the fourth-most expensive football transfer. With Atlético, he won the 2020–21 La Liga and over the following years, he had loan spells with Chelsea and Barcelona, before rejoining Chelsea permanently in 2024. After a brief loan spell with AC Milan, Félix joined Al-Nassr in 2025, helping them win the Saudi Pro League title and being named the league's Player of the Season in his first year.

Félix is a former Portugal youth international, representing his country at under-18, under-19, and under-21 levels. He earned his first senior cap in the 2019 UEFA Nations League Finals, winning the inaugural edition of the competition on home soil. He went on to represent his country at two UEFA European Championships (2020 and 2024) and two FIFA World Cups (2022 and 2026), and also won a second international trophy at the 2025 UEFA Nations League Finals.

== Club career ==
=== Early career ===
Félix started playing football at Os Pestinhas in 2007 before joining the youth ranks of FC Porto a year later at age eight. After Félix moved to Porto, he faced challenges such as extensive schedules including daily shuttle hours between Viseu and Porto. He moved out of his parents' house at age 12 to live near Porto's youth training grounds; in a later interview, Félix revealed that during this time he considered quitting football due to the lack of playing time, but his father convinced him to pursue his career. Félix was released by Porto in 2014 because of his slight frame (he denied these claims and said he left of his own volition) and moved to Lisbon rivals Benfica in 2015, at age 15, after a season-long loan at Padroense.

=== Benfica ===
==== 2016–2018: Youth career ====
Félix debuted professionally at age 16 for Benfica's reserve team in LigaPro on 17 September 2016, as an 83rd-minute substitute for Aurélio Buta in a goalless draw at Freamunde. At the time, he was the youngest player to debut for Benfica B, a record since been broken by Cher Ndour in May 2021. He played 13 matches and scored three goals over the season, the first being a consolation in a 2–1 loss to his hometown team Académico de Viseu on 15 February 2017. Later, on 30 January 2018, he scored a hat-trick in a 5–0 home win over Famalicão. During that season, Félix played in the 2016–17 UEFA Youth League, in which he was a key part of Benfica reaching the final of the competition, which it lost to Red Bull Salzburg (2–1), scoring six goals in the tournament.

==== 2018–19: Rise to the first team and league title ====
Félix was promoted to Benfica's first team for the 2018–19 season, making his debut in a 2–0 Primeira Liga win at Boavista on 18 August. A week later, he scored his first Primeira Liga goal, thus becoming the youngest player to score in the Lisbon derby, which ended in a 1–1 tie. On 16 January 2019, he scored the qualifying goal against Vitória de Guimarães in the Portuguese Cup quarter-finals.

After Bruno Lage took over as coach of Benfica, his first decision was to use Félix more regularly, partnering him with Haris Seferovic in the attack, taking advantage of the bad run of Facundo Ferreyra and Nicolás Castillo and the injury of Jonas. Later on, Félix was praised for his performance in a 4–2 away win over Sporting CP in the league on 3 February, subsequently sparking interest from several European clubs. A month later, he scored the equaliser in a 2–1 away comeback win over Porto in the O Clássico, allowing his side to overtake their rivals at the top of the Primeira Liga table.

On 11 April 2019, Félix scored a hat-trick in a 4–2 UEFA Europa League win over Eintracht Frankfurt. In doing so, he became the youngest ever player (aged 19 years and 152 days) to score a hat-trick in the competition, breaking Marko Pjaca's record by 67 days. Félix finished his first season with 20 goals for his team, including one on the final day of the league campaign, in a 4–1 win over Santa Clara to seal the title; his 15 league goals put him joint-fourth for the season. Across Europe's seven best leagues, he ranked second among teenagers for goals and assists, behind Kai Havertz and Jadon Sancho, respectively.

=== Atlético Madrid ===
On 3 July 2019, Félix signed a seven-year contract with Spanish club Atlético Madrid for a transfer fee of €126 million (£113 million), the fourth highest sum ever paid in football (this was also Benfica's biggest transfer and Atlético's most expensive signing ever) as well as the second highest fee ever paid for a teenager (after Kylian Mbappé), with the Spanish club initially paying €30 million and the rest €96 million via instalments, thus surpassing Félix's €120 million buyout clause, and with Benfica paying €12 million in mediation services. Upon his arrival to the club he was handed the number 7 shirt previously worn by Antoine Griezmann, who had departed to Barcelona.

==== 2019–20: Debut season ====
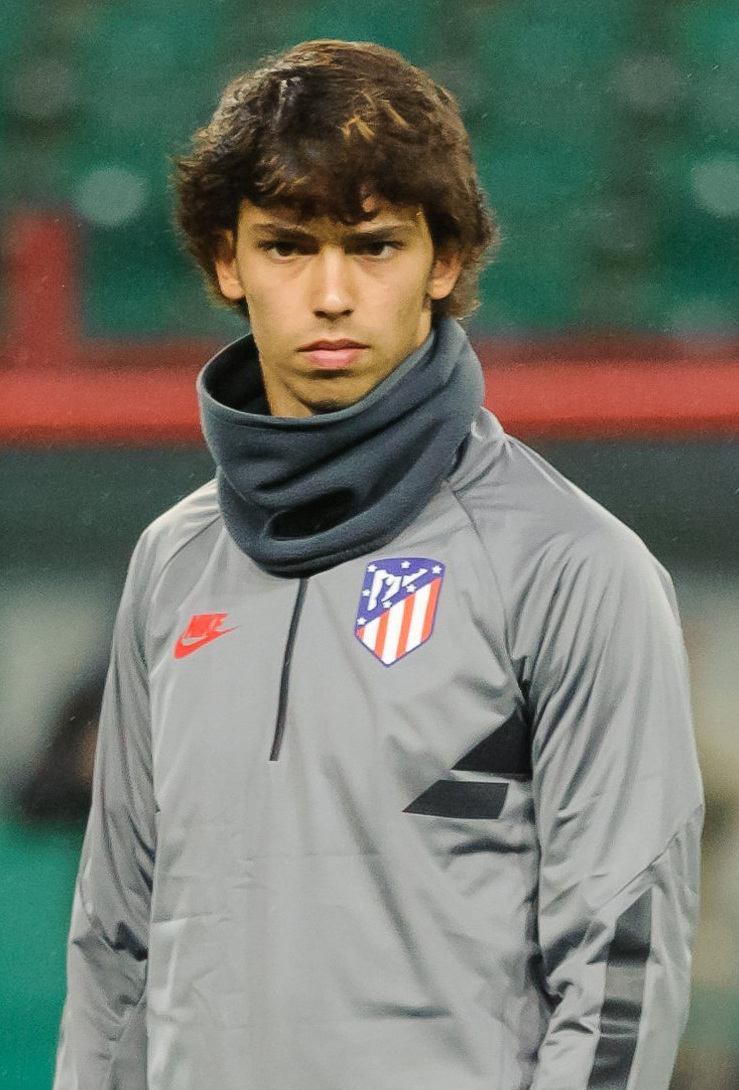
Félix with Atlético Madrid in 2019

Félix made his competitive debut on 19 August 2019, in a 1–0 victory over Getafe. Despite not scoring a goal, he managed to win a penalty for Atlético after being fouled inside the box which Álvaro Morata subsequently failed to convert. On 25 August, Félix provided an assist for Vitolo in a 1–0 away win against Leganés. He scored his first La Liga goal on 1 September, in a 3–2 victory over Eibar; he was later substituted in the 84th minute for Thomas Partey. On 1 October, Félix scored his first UEFA Champions League goal and set up another goal in a 2–0 away victory against Lokomotiv Moscow, becoming the youngest goalscorer for Atlético Madrid in the competition in the process, at 19 years of age.

On 19 October, Félix suffered an ankle injury against Valencia, after a rash challenge by Dani Parejo, leaving his team with only ten men on the pitch, as his coach Diego Simeone had already made the maximum number of allowed substitutions. Initially, Simeone thought that Félix's injury was not too serious, until the club's medical team revealed that the ankle injury could be severe, leading him to be sidelined for one month. Félix made his return on 23 November in a 1–1 away draw against Granada. During this time, Félix was one of the 30 candidates who was nominated for the 2019 Ballon d'Or.

On 27 November 2019, Félix became the second Portuguese player, after Renato Sanches, to win the Golden Boy award for the best player in Europe under the age of 21, ahead of Borussia Dortmund's Jadon Sancho. In December, Félix placed 28th place in the voting polls for the 2019 Ballon d'Or.

Over the following months, Félix started to have difficulties in adapting to Diego Simeone's playing style, with Simeone trying to find his ideal position either as a right winger or second striker; he also struggled with the fact that the forwards under Simeone were expected to press their opponents frequently when playing off the ball, which often left him drained during match, while when in possession, he was also unable to create scoring chances, leading Spanish newspaper Marca to name him one of the most disappointing transfers of the season.

On 9 January 2020, Félix made his debut in the Supercopa de España, starting in a 3–2 victory against Barcelona in the semi-finals of the competition. During the match, Félix was involved in an altercation with Jordi Alba and his teammates Lionel Messi and Luis Suárez. On 12 January, Atlético Madrid lost to their rivals Real Madrid 4–1 on penalties in the final. On 23 January, Félix made his Copa del Rey debut in the Round of 32, providing an assist for Ángel Correa in a 2–1 loss against Cultural Leonesa. Three days later, Félix suffered a second injury to his leg in a 0–0 home draw against Leganés, sidelining him once again for a month, and leading him to miss to Atlético Madrid's next three league matches, which included the second Madrid derby of the season and Atlético Madrid's first leg of their Champions League round of 16 tie against defending champions Liverpool. He made his return on 23 February, replacing Vitolo in the 57th minute, and scoring the third goal in a 3–1 home victory against Villarreal.

On 11 March 2020, during extra time in the second leg of Atlético's tie against Liverpool, Félix provided an assist for Marcos Llorente in an eventual 3–2 away win, which saw his team qualify to the quarter-finals of the competition. On 25 May, it was announced that Félix had suffered an injury on his left knee, requiring him to be sidelined for at least three weeks. On 13 August, Félix was substituted on in the second half against RB Leipzig in the Champions League quarter-finals, winning and converting a penalty to equalise for Atlético; the match would end in a 1–2 defeat that saw his side exit the competition.

==== 2020–21: La Liga title and injury struggles ====
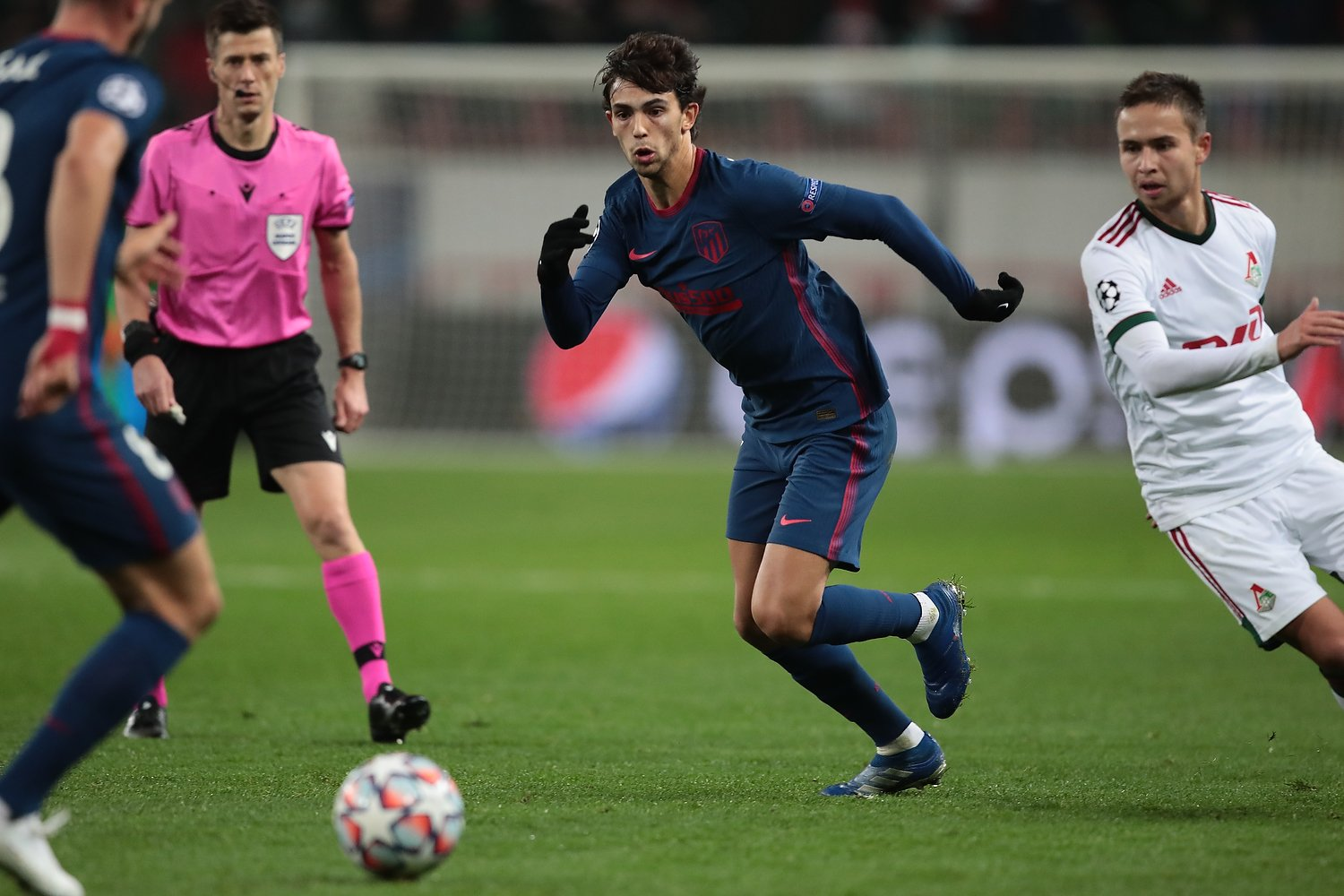
Félix dribbling in 2020

On 27 September 2020, in Atlético's La Liga opening fixture, Félix scored, provided an assist and managed to win a penalty for his side after being fouled inside the box (which Saúl Ñíguez subsequently failed to convert), in Atlético's 6–1 win against Granada. On 27 October, he scored a brace in a 3–2 win over Red Bull Salzburg in the 2020–21 UEFA Champions League group stage. Following back-to-back braces against Osasuna and Cádiz in La Liga, he was named the league's Player of the Month for November 2020. On 1 December, Félix scored against European champions Bayern Munich as his side drew 1–1. On 24 January 2021, he headed in a corner to equalise for Atlético in their 3–1 win over Valencia, scoring his first league goal in over two months. He was infected with COVID-19 in February, which forced him to miss Atlético's next fixtures against Celta Vigo and Granada. He returned on 17 February, appearing in a 1–1 away draw against Levante.

On 16 May, the penultimate matchday of the La Liga season, Félix provided a crucial assist to Renan Lodi of his side's 2–1 comeback victory over Osasuna, to ensure that Atlético would remain on top of the table. Due to a succession of injuries and lack of game time, Félix lost his starting place in attack to Ángel Correa, Luis Suárez, Thomas Lemar, and Yannick Carrasco, as he had been playing since November with an injury. At the end of the season, he had made 31 league appearances, scoring seven goals and providing six assists, as Atlético won their first La Liga title in seven years.

==== 2021–22: Atlético's Player of the Season ====
Félix missed Atlético's first three matches of the 2021–22 season, as he continued to rehabilitate from the ankle injury he had been suffering since November. He made his return from injury on 12 September, replacing Antoine Griezmann in the 58th minute in a 2–1 away victory against Espanyol. On 18 September, Félix was sent off in the 78th minute in a 0–0 home draw against Athletic Bilbao, for calling the referee "crazy", leading him to receive a two-match ban. Félix began regaining his place in the team, following his performances in Atlético's next three matches, creating both of Atlético goals, in a 2–0 home victory in La Liga against Barcelona on 2 October, as well assisting Antoine Griezmann second goal in a 2–3 home defeat against Liverpool in the Champions League on 19 October and assisting Luis Suárez first goal in a 2–2 home draw against Real Sociedad in La Liga on 24 October. He would score his first goal of the season on 31 October, in a 3–0 home win against Real Betis. For his performances in October, Félix was awarded Atlético Madrid Player of the Month by the club's supporters.

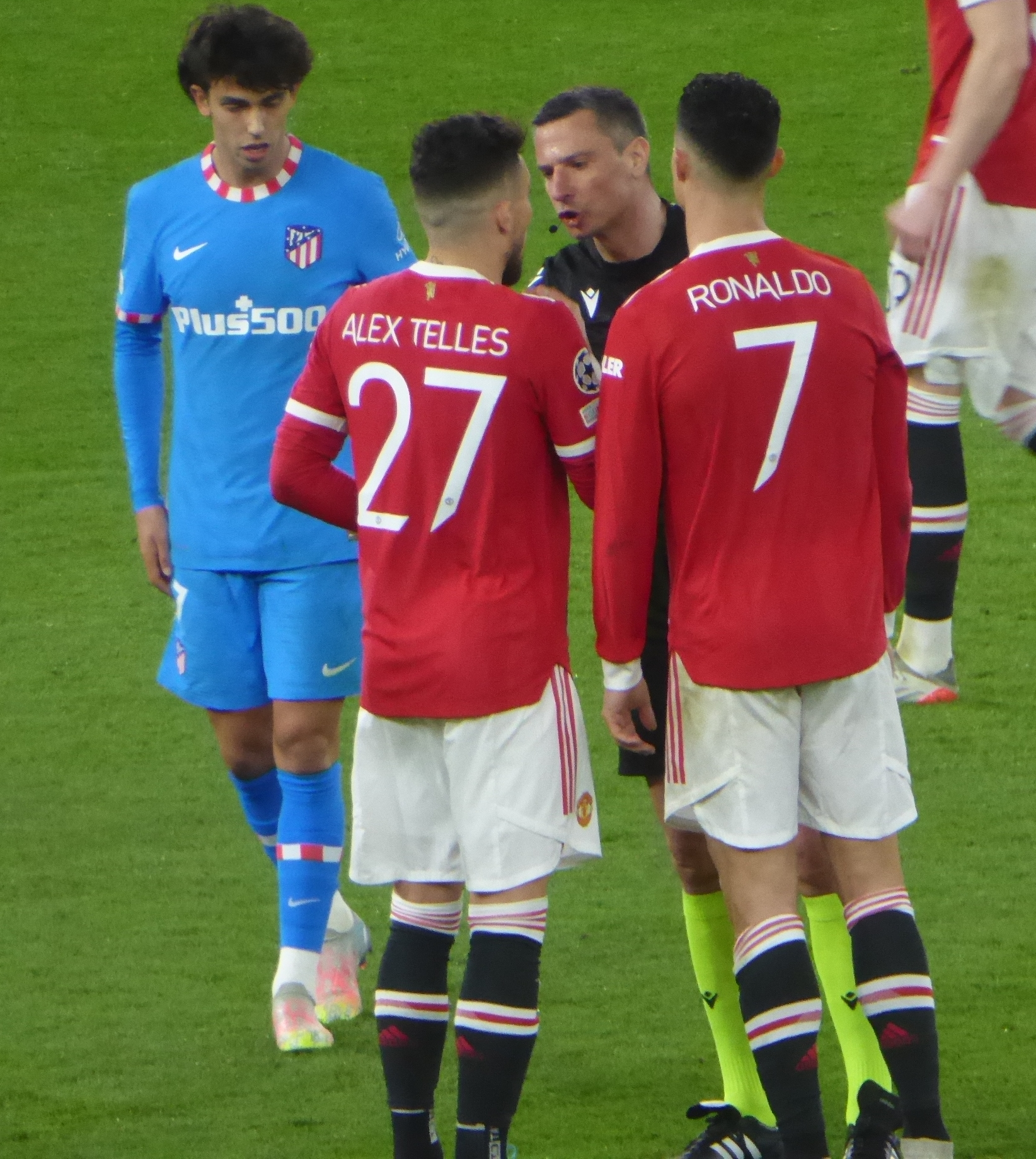
Félix (left) in a Champions League match in 2022

After suffering a hamstring injury following a league against Osasuna on 20 November, Félix began falling out with manager Diego Simeone, losing his place as a starter. This would lead to him being rumoured to a potential departure for the club in January, which Atlético Madrid's president Enrique Cerezo dismissed. Despite impressing in the 2–0 loss to rivals Real Madrid in the Madrid derby, after coming from the bench, on 17 December manager Diego Simeone stated that he was an "important player for the team, but "anything can happen" in January. He would be given an opportunity from the manager in the starting line against Granada on 22 December, scoring a goal and having another disallowed in a 2–1 loss.

On 19 February 2022, Félix made his 100th appearance for the club, opening the scoring and provided an assist in Atlético's 3–0 away win over Osasuna. The following match, on 23 February, Félix scored Atlético's opening goal in a 1–1 home draw over Manchester United at the first leg of Champions League round-of-16 tie. In the reverse fixture, on 15 March, Félix created Renan Lodi's goal, which was assisted by Antoine Griezmann, to help Atlético defeat Manchester United 1–0 at Old Trafford and qualify to the quarter-finals, securing a 2–1 aggregate win. The following six matches, after scoring six goals and providing two assists, Félix was awarded in March, the league's Player of the Month award. On 17 April, during a match against Espanyol, Félix suffered a hamstring injury, ruling him out for the remainder of the season. At the end of the season, Félix was awarded Atlético Madrid's Player of the Season award, named by the club's supporters, after finishing the campaign with 10 goals and six assists.

==== 2022–23: Desire to leave Atlético and loan to Chelsea ====
Félix started the 2022–23 season, on 15 August, providing a hat-trick of assists for the first time in his career as Atlético beat Getafe 3–0 away from home. In the process, he became the third Portuguese player to provide three assists in a match in La Liga. The following matches were preceded by a dispute over Félix's relationship with Diego Simeone, where Félix lost his place in the starting line-up and became the club's fifth choice attacker behind Ángel Correa, Antoine Griezmann, Alvaro Morata and Matheus Cunha. His relationship with his manager deteriorated further on 10 October, during a Champions League group stage match against Club Brugge, where in the second half of the match, Simeone sent him to warm up three times, only to leave him on the bench. Afterwards, he proceeded to ask his agent Jorge Mendes to find him a new club in the winter transfer window, with this episode sparking his desire to leave the club. After featuring sporadically for Atlético in the following matches, Félix came on as a 60th-minute substitute and scored his first two goals of the season on 29 October, as he was named man of the match in a 3–2 away loss to Cádiz.

During the 2022 FIFA World Cup, on 6 December, Atlético's CEO Miguel Ángel Gil Marín confirmed the club's intention to sell Félix stating that "Félix is the biggest bet the club has ever made. I think he's a high-performance player, one of the best in the world, but, for reasons that it's not worth naming now, the relationship between him and the coach is not good, nor is his motivation. I would love for it to continue, but that is not the player's intention."

On 11 January 2023, Félix joined Premier League club Chelsea on loan for the remainder of the 2022–23 season, extending his contract with Atlético to 2027 before the move. He made his debut the following day in a 2–1 defeat away to Fulham, in which he was sent off in the 58th minute for a tackle on Kenny Tete, later receiving a three-match ban. Returning after suspension on 11 February, Félix scored his first goal for the club in a 1–1 league draw at West Ham United. After scoring four goals in 20 appearances, Atlético's president Enrique Cerezo confirmed that Chelsea's new head coach, Mauricio Pochettino, did not want the club to sign Félix on a permanent deal following the expiration of his loan. This led Félix to return to Atlético.

==== 2023–24: Loan to Barcelona ====
Félix returned to pre-season training in July, where he almost immediately had a tense exchange with Atlético sporting director Andrea Berta and was forced to train with the reserves. The situation between Félix and Atlético, especially with the manager, had already deteriorated since last season, which was the motive behind his loan to Chelsea. His agent Jorge Mendes offered him to Paris Saint-Germain, but the club rejected the chance to sign him.

"I would love to play for Barça. Barcelona has always been my first choice and I would love to join Barça. It was always my dream since I was a kid. If it happens, it will be a dream come true for me”.

— Félix on his desire to join Barcelona in an interview with Fabrizio Romano in July 2023.

On 18 July, Félix stated his desire to join Barcelona in an interview with Fabrizio Romano. Both Atlético's directors and the supporters did not appreciate the statement released by Félix offering himself to one of his club's biggest rivals, leading him to not play a single minute of the club's pre-season in the summer, whilse also being the target of whistles by Atlético's supporters every time he was present at the Metropolitano Stadium. He also lost the number 7 shirt back to Antoine Griezmann, being assigned the number 18 shirt. Félix would receive an offer from Saudi Pro League side Al-Hilal to join them on a one-year loan deal, with their manager and compatriot Jorge Jesus trying to convince Félix to join them on multiple occasions. However, Atlético rejected Al-Hilal's loan offer, as they wanted a permanent deal for Félix. He would be called up for Atlético's first official match of the 2023–24 season against Granada, but only featured on the bench.

On 1 September, Félix joined Barcelona on loan for the 2023–24 season, alongside his Portugal teammate João Cancelo. Initially Barcelona was not interested in him, but after failed moves for Bernardo Silva and Neymar, the club turned to Félix, with manager Xavi giving his approval for the move. According to Matteo Moretto of Relevo, Barcelona covered 100% of his wages, which were restructured after Félix agreed a contract extension until 2029 before leaving Atlético, and as a consequence lowering his annual salary, which was crucial to make his deal fit within Barcelona's salary cap in La Liga.

He made his debut two days later as an 80th-minute substitute in a 2–1 away win over Osasuna. On 16 September, he scored on his first start for Barça, opening the score in the 25th minute of a 5–0 league victory against Real Betis with a sharp finish from a narrow angle. He was subsequently praised for his dictating play, and after the game he stated: "I'm very happy to be starting games again, the feelings are very good – it's easy to play in this team". On his next match, on 19 September, Félix made his Champions League debut for Barcelona, scoring twice and providing an assist in a 5–0 win over Antwerp, being named man of the match. After being eleven matches scoreless, on 28 November, he scored the winning goal in a 2–1 comeback at home against his first club's rivals Porto in the Champions League group stage to secure the club's spot in the round of sixteen for the first time since 2020–21 season.

On 3 December, he netted the only goal in a 1–0 victory over his parent club Atlético Madrid. At the reverse fixture at Metropolitano, on 17 March, Félix opened Barcelona's 3–0 victory over Atlético Madrid, helping his side move to the second spot in the La Liga table. He became the first player to score in both games against Atlético Madrid in the same league season since Lionel Messi in 2019–20.

=== Return to Chelsea ===
On 21 August 2024, Félix returned to Chelsea, signing for them on a seven-year contract for a fee of €52 million (£42 million) plus €5 million (£4.3 million) in add-ons, and Conor Gallagher moving in the other direction on a permanent transfer for a fee of €42 million (£35 million). He scored on his second debut, a 6–2 away win against Wolverhampton Wanderers on 25 August. Afterwards, he only started a small number of matches and was used more as a rotation option, playing mostly in the UEFA Conference League.

==== Loan to AC Milan ====
On 4 February 2025, Félix signed on a loan contract with AC Milan, for the remainder of the 2024–25 season, after struggling for minutes at Chelsea, where he had only started a few league games under Enzo Maresca. Milan were also in a difficult season and wanted extra creativity in attack under Sérgio Conceição, who had personally asked for his signing. A day later, he scored on his debut in a 3–1 victory over Roma in the Coppa Italia quarter-finals. He subsequently struggled to influence matches, leading him to be benched for Milan's final matches of the season, where on 29 May, they were defeated by Bologna in the Coppa Italia final and also finished eighth-place in Serie A, failing to qualify for any European competition. At the end of the season, Milan decided not to keep him beyond the loan, and he returned to Chelsea at the end of the season.

=== Al-Nassr ===
On 29 July 2025, Félix signed for Saudi Pro League club Al-Nassr for an initial fee of £26.2 million. The next month on 19 August, he made his debut for the club at the 2025 Saudi Super Cup and scored his first goal for them in a 2–1 victory over Al-Ittihad. On 29 August, Félix made his league debut against Al-Taawoun and scored a hat-trick in a 5–0 win. He finished his debut season with 20 goals and 13 assists, playing a key role in the club's Saudi Pro League title triumph. He was ultimately named the Saudi Pro League Player of the Season.

== International career ==
=== Youth ===
On 14 June 2017, Félix began his international career with Portugal's under-18 team, debuting against Norway, replacing Elves Baldé in the 58th minute. In this friendly match, Félix scored a brace in a 3–0 victory in Lisbon. On 10 October 2017, Félix debuted for Portugal's under-21 team for the qualification of the 2019 UEFA European Under-21 Championship, in a 3–1 defeat against Bosnia and Herzegovina, replacing Xadas in the 56th minute.

On 15 January 2018, Félix debuted for Portugal's under-19 team as a 27th-minute substitute for an injured Jorge Teixeira in a 2–1 win over Turkey. On 23 March 2018, Félix scored his first international goal for Portugal's under-21 team in a 7–0 win over Liechtenstein. In the end of the qualification process, he had scored four goals, helping guide Portugal to the play-offs. In the first leg of the play-offs, Portugal faced Poland in a 1–0 away victory, but eventually lost in the second leg in a 3–1 home defeat, failing to qualify for the tournament.

During his international youth career, Félix would go on to represent the under-18, under-19 and under-21 teams, amassing 14 youth caps and scoring six goals overall.

=== Senior ===
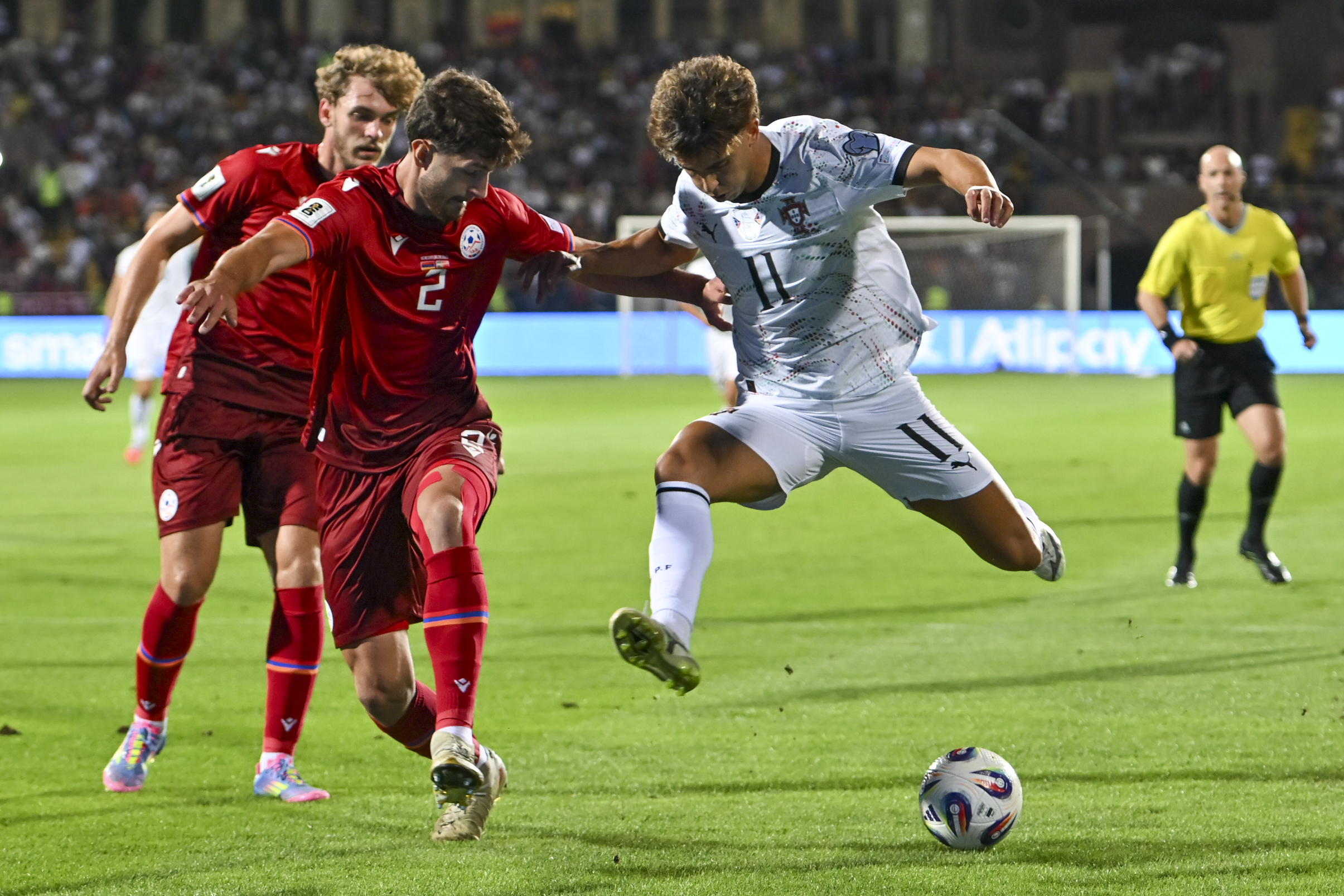
Félix with Portugal in 2025

On 15 March 2019, manager Fernando Santos called up Félix to the senior team for the first time, ahead of the opening UEFA Euro 2020 qualifying matches. During training with the national squad, Félix injured his foot and thus missed Portugal's match against Serbia on 25 March. Félix was also selected for the 2019 UEFA Nations League Finals squad on home soil. He made his international debut for the senior team on 5 June against Switzerland in the semi-finals, where he was substituted in the 71st minute of a 3–1 win. Four days later, Portugal defeated the Netherlands 1–0 in the tournament's final.

Félix scored his first international goal on 5 September 2020 in a 4–1 home win over Croatia in the 2020–21 UEFA Nations League. He was selected for UEFA Euro 2020, replacing João Moutinho in the 55th minute in a 1–0 loss to Belgium in the round of 16 on 27 June.

In October 2022, Félix was named in Portugal's preliminary 55-man squad for the 2022 FIFA World Cup in Qatar, being included in the final 26-man squad for the tournament. On 25 November, Félix scored his first World Cup goal in Portugal's 3–2 group stage win against Ghana. On 6 December, Félix provided two assists in Portugal's 6–1 win over Switzerland in the round of 16. Portugal were eliminated in the quarter-finals after losing 1–0 to Morocco.

On 11 September 2023, Félix scored the closing goal as Portugal defeated Luxembourg 9–0 at home in the UEFA Euro 2024 qualifiers, the biggest win in the team's history. In their quarter-final match against France in the final tournament, he was the only player to miss a penalty in the shoot-out which ended 5–3, resulting in Portugal's elimination from the tournament.

On September 6, 2025, Félix scored a brace as Portugal defeated Armenia 5–0 in their opening match of the FIFA 2026 World Cup Qualifiers.

On 19 May 2026, Félix was selected in the 26-man squad for the 2026 FIFA World Cup.

== Player profile ==
=== Style of play ===
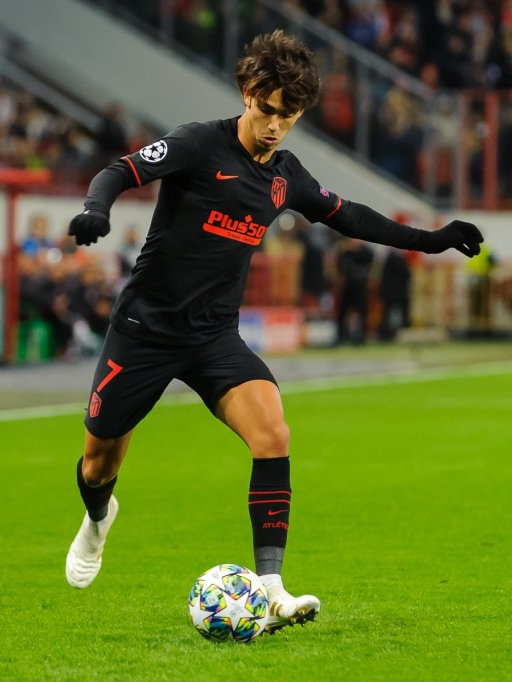
Félix playing for Atlético Madrid in 2019

Félix is regarded as a highly skilful and technical player capable of playing in several offensive positions, due to his versatility; throughout his career, he has been deployed as a striker, as a second striker, or even as a winger, although his primary position is that of an attacking midfielder. With Benfica, Félix usually played as a second striker in a 4–4–2 formation, where he was tasked with linking up the midfield with the attack, as well as creating opportunities for the team's main striker, while also being given the freedom to make runs into the box and score goals himself. With Atlético Madrid, he has occasionally played in a similar role, but has often been deployed as a winger on either flanks or the second striker in the team's 4–4–2 formation. A technical gifted and intelligent player, with an eye for goal, his primary traits are his creativity, finishing, touch on the ball, and dribbling skills, as well as his vision and precise passing.

=== Reception ===
Considered by Benfica to be one of the most promising players to have emerged from their youth ranks, Félix was also once regarded by pundits as one of the most talented young players in world football. His playing style has led him to be compared to Brazilian former playmaker Kaká and former Benfica players Rui Costa and João Pinto; he has also been likened by some in the media to compatriot Cristiano Ronaldo, as well as former Atlético Madrid forwards Sergio Agüero and Antoine Griezmann.

Regarding Félix's playing style in 2019, Rui Costa praised the youngster for his "understanding of the game," and his "ability to know where to be in front of goal." João Tralhão, his former youth coach at Benfica, praising Félix's versatility said, "He can play anywhere [in attack], because he always finds the spaces to do what the coach wants. He understands that positioning like few in the world, he's very clever."

== Personal life ==
Félix was born in Viseu. He is of Brazilian descent through his father who was born in Brazil. His parents, Carlos and Carla, are both teachers. He has a younger brother, Hugo, who plays for Benfica's youth ranks. Growing up, Félix's idols were Kaká and Rui Costa, the latter a player he looked to emulate. Félix was in a relationship with Portuguese actress Margarida Corceiro until May 2023. In 2025, Felix dated Colombian model Valentina Rueda.

In April 2020, Félix made a donation of equipment to a crowdfunding campaign for a hospital in his hometown in Viseu during the COVID-19 pandemic.

== Career statistics ==
=== Club ===
As of match played 2 November 2026

Appearances and goals by club, season and competition
Club	Season	League			National cup (Note: Includes Taça de Portugal, Copa del Rey, FA Cup, Coppa Italia, King's Cup)		League cup (Note: Includes Taça da Liga, EFL Cup)		Continental		Other		Total	
Club	Season	Division	Apps	Goals	Apps	Goals	Apps	Goals	Apps	Goals	Apps	Goals	Apps	Goals
Benfica B	2016–17	LigaPro	13	3	—		—		—		—		13	3
Benfica B	2017–18	LigaPro	17	4	—		—		—		—		17	4
Benfica B	Total		30	7	—		—		—		—		30	7
Benfica	2018–19	Primeira Liga	26	15	6	1	2	1	9 (Note: Three appearances in UEFA Champions League, six appearances and three goals in UEFA Europa League)	3	—		43	20
Atlético Madrid	2019–20	La Liga	27	6	1	0	—		6 (Note: Appearances in UEFA Champions League)	3	2 (Note: Appearance(s) in Supercopa de España)	0	36	9
Atlético Madrid	2020–21	La Liga	31	7	1	0	—		8	3	—		40	10
Atlético Madrid	2021–22	La Liga	24	8	2	1	—		8	1	1	0	35	10
Atlético Madrid	2022–23	La Liga	14	4	1	1	—		5	0	—		20	5
Atlético Madrid	Total		96	25	5	2	—		27	7	3	0	131	34
Chelsea (loan)	2022–23	Premier League	16	4	—		—		4	0	—		20	4
Barcelona (loan)	2023–24	La Liga	30	7	3	0	—		9	3	2	0	44	10
Chelsea	2024–25	Premier League	12	1	1	2	2	0	5 (Note: Appearances in UEFA Conference League)	4	—		20	7
AC Milan (loan)	2024–25	Serie A	15	2	4	1	—		2	0	—		21	3
Al-Nassr	2025–26	Saudi Pro League	33	20	2	1	—		10 (Note: Appearances in AFC Champions League Two)	4	2 (Note: Appearances in Saudi Super Cup)	1	47	26
Al-Nassr	2026–27	Saudi Pro League	10	3	1	2	—		3 (Note: Appearances in AFC Champions League Elite)	2	0	0	14	7
Al-Nassr	Total		43	23	3	3	—		13	6	2	1	61	33
Career total			268	84	22	9	4	1	69	23	7	1	370	118

=== International ===
As of match played 17 November 2026

Appearances and goals by national team and year
National team	Year	Apps	Goals
Portugal	2019	5	0
Portugal	2020	8	3
Portugal	2021	7	0
Portugal	2022	8	1
Portugal	2023	8	3
Portugal	2024	9	2
Portugal	2025	5	2
Portugal	2026	13	4
Total		63	15

As of match played 1 October 2026
Scores and results list Portugal's goal tally first, score column indicates score after each Félix goal.

List of international goals scored by João Félix
No.	Date	Venue	Cap	Opponent	Score	Result	Competition	Ref.
1	5 September 2020	Estádio do Dragão, Porto, Portugal	6	Croatia	3–0	4–1	2020–21 UEFA Nations League A	
2	11 November 2020	Estádio da Luz, Lisbon, Portugal	11	Andorra	7–0	7–0	Friendly	
3	17 November 2020	Stadion Poljud, Split, Croatia	13	Croatia	2–1	3–2	2020–21 UEFA Nations League A	
4	24 November 2022	Stadium 974, Doha, Qatar	25	Ghana	2–1	3–2	2022 FIFA World Cup	
5	26 March 2023	Stade de Luxembourg, Luxembourg City, Luxembourg	30	Luxembourg	2–0	6–0	UEFA Euro 2024 qualifying	
6	11 September 2023	Estádio Algarve, Algarve, Portugal	32	Luxembourg	9–0	9–0	UEFA Euro 2024 qualifying	
7	16 October 2023	Bilino Polje Stadium, Zenica, Bosnia and Herzegovina	34	Bosnia and Herzegovina	5–0	5–0	UEFA Euro 2024 qualifying	
8	11 June 2024	Estádio Municipal de Aveiro, Aveiro, Portugal	39	Republic of Ireland	1–0	3–0	Friendly	
9	18 November 2024	Stadion Poljud, Split, Croatia	45	Croatia	1–0	1–1	2024–25 UEFA Nations League A	
10	6 September 2025	Vazgen Sargsyan Republican Stadium, Yerevan, Armenia	46	Armenia	1–0	5–0	2026 FIFA World Cup qualification	
11	6 September 2025	Vazgen Sargsyan Republican Stadium, Yerevan, Armenia	46	Armenia	5–0	5–0	2026 FIFA World Cup qualification	
12	31 March 2026	Mercedes-Benz Stadium, Atlanta, United States	52	United States	2–0	2–0	Friendly	
13	24 September 2026	Estádio José Alvalade, Lisbon, Portugal	58	Wales	1–0	1–0	2026–27 UEFA Nations League A	
14	27 September 2026	Ullevaal Stadion, Oslo, Norway	59	Norway	1–0	2–1	2026–27 UEFA Nations League A	
15	1 October 2026	Parken Stadium, Copenhagen, Denmark	60	Denmark	4–2	4–2	2026–27 UEFA Nations League A	

== Honours ==
Benfica

- Primeira Liga: 2018–19

Atlético Madrid

- La Liga: 2020–21

Chelsea

- UEFA Conference League: 2024–25

Al-Nassr

- Saudi Pro League: 2025–26

Portugal

- UEFA Nations League: 2018–19, 2024–25

Individual

- Primeira Liga Player of the Month: January 2019
- SJPF Young Player of the Month: January 2019
- UEFA Europa League Squad of the Season: 2018–19
- CNID Best Revelation Footballer of the Year: 2019
- Primeira Liga Best Young Player of the Year: 2018–19
- Golden Globes: 2019 Best Newcomer
- A Bola Player of the Year: 2019
- Golden Boy: 2019
- Globe Revelation Player: 2019
- La Liga Player of the Month: November 2020, March 2022
- La Liga Goal of the Month: April 2024
- Atlético Madrid Player of the Year: 2021–22
- Saudi Pro League Player of the Month: September 2025, May 2026
- Saudi Pro League Player of the Season: 2025–26
