= Aguilera =

Aguilera may refer to:

- Aguilera (surname), people with the surname Aguilera
- Aguilera (volcano), a mountain in Chile
- La Aguilera, a village in Spain
- Aguilera (album), ninth studio album released by Christina Aguilera
