= Javi Serrano =

Spanish footballer (born 2003)

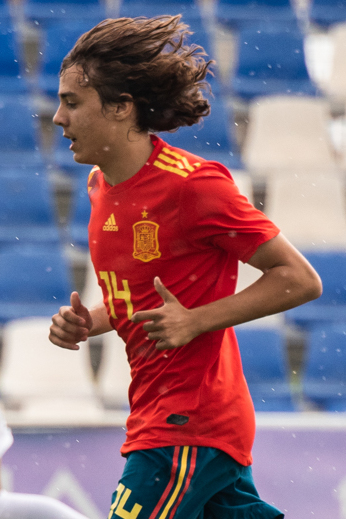
- Serrano playing for Spain U17 in 2019

Personal information
- Full name: Javier Serrano Martínez
- Date of birth: 16 January 2003 (age 23)
- Place of birth: Madrid, Spain
- Height: 1.78 m (5 ft 10 in)
- Position: Midfielder

Team information
- Current team: Atlético Madrid
- Number: 29

Youth career
- 2010–2021: Atlético Madrid

Senior career*
| Years | Team | Apps | (Gls) |
| 2021– | Atlético Madrid B | 64 | (1) |
| 2021– | Atlético Madrid | 5 | (0) |
| 2022–2023 | → Mirandés (loan) | 9 | (0) |
| 2023 | → Ibiza (loan) | 15 | (0) |
| 2023–2024 | → Sturm Graz (loan) | 8 | (0) |
| 2023–2024 | → Sturm Graz II (loan) | 5 | (0) |

International career^{‡}
| 2019 | Spain U16 | 8 | (0) |
| 2019–2020 | Spain U17 | 7 | (0) |
| 2019 | Spain U18 | 2 | (0) |
| 2021–2022 | Spain U19 | 6 | (0) |
- * Club domestic league appearances and goals as of 1 December 2025 ‡ National team caps and goals as of 29 March 2022

Javier "Javi" Serrano Martínez (born 16 January 2003) is a Spanish professional footballer who plays as a midfielder for La Liga club Atlético Madrid.

== Club career ==
Javi Serrano arrived in the Atlético Madrid academy as a 7 year old in 2010. There, he signed a five-year contract on the summer 2020.

During the 2020–21 season, Serrano was part of the Juvenil Atlético squad that came top of their group against Rayo Vallecano and Real Madrid, before being defeated by the latter in the Copa de Campeones.

Serrano made his debut for Atlético B in March 2021, later becoming a regular starter with their reserve during the second phase of the 2020–21 Segunda División B. At the end of the season he extended his contract with Atlético until 2026, while also being scouted by several other big European clubs such as Paris Saint-Germain.

During the 2021–22 pre-season, Serrano was selected by Diego Simeone to train with the first team, starting games such as their 2–1 win against VfL Wolfsburg. He and Giuliano Simeone were the only two players outside of the first team regulars to play all five games of the five friendlies before the start of the season.

After already making the professional squad for the early La Liga games, Serrano made his professional debut for Atlético Madrid on the 3 November 2021, replacing Ángel Correa in the 74th minute of a 2–0 away loss against Liverpool, during the group stage of the UEFA Champions League. Serrano made his debut in the starting lineup on 20 April 2022, in a home La Liga fixture against Granada.

On 26 August 2022, Serrano was loaned to Segunda División side CD Mirandés for the season. The following 31 January, after featuring sparingly, he moved to fellow league team UD Ibiza also in a temporary deal.

On 30 June 2023, Serrano moved abroad for the first time in his career, after agreeing to a one-year loan deal with SK Sturm Graz of the Austrian Football Bundesliga.

== International career ==
Serrano is a youth international for Spain, having been part of all the age groups since the under-16. After the COVID-19 break, that put on hold most junior international competitions, he became a regular with the Spain under-19 team, earning his first selection in late August 2021.

== Career statistics ==
As of match played 31 October 2024

Appearances and goals by club, season and competition
| Club | Season | League | | | National cup (Note: Includes Copa del Rey, Austrian Cup) | | Europe | | Other | | Total | |
| Club | Season | Division | Apps | Goals | Apps | Goals | Apps | Goals | Apps | Goals | Apps | Goals |
|---|---|---|---|---|---|---|---|---|---|---|---|---|
| Atlético Madrid B | 2020–21 | Segunda División B | 8 | 0 | — | | — | | — | | 8 | 0 |
| Atlético Madrid B | 2021–22 | Tercera Federación | 19 | 0 | — | | — | | — | | 19 | 0 |
| Atlético Madrid B | Total | | 27 | 0 | — | | — | | — | | 27 | 0 |
| Atlético Madrid | 2021–22 | La Liga | 5 | 0 | 1 | 0 | 1 (Note: Appearance in UEFA Champions League) | 0 | 0 | 0 | 7 | 0 |
| Atlético Madrid | 2024–25 | La Liga | 0 | 0 | 1 | 0 | 1 | 0 | 0 | 0 | 2 | 0 |
| Atlético Madrid | Total | | 5 | 0 | 2 | 0 | 2 | 0 | 0 | 0 | 9 | 0 |
| Mirandés (loan) | 2022–23 | Segunda División | 9 | 0 | 2 | 0 | — | | — | | 11 | 0 |
| Ibiza (loan) | 2022–23 | Segunda División | 15 | 0 | — | | — | | — | | 15 | 0 |
| Sturm Graz (loan) | 2023–24 | Austrian Bundesliga | 8 | 0 | 4 | 0 | 5 (Note: Two appearance in UEFA Champions League, three appearances in UEFA Europa League) | 0 | — | | 17 | 0 |
| Career total | | | 64 | 0 | 8 | 0 | 7 | 0 | 0 | 0 | 79 | 0 |

== Honours ==
Sturm Graz

- Austrian Cup: 2023–24
- Austrian Bundesliga: 2023-24
