= 2021–22 Atlético Madrid season =

115th season in existence of Atlético Madrid

Atlético Madrid
2021–22 season
- President: Enrique Cerezo
- Head coach: Diego Simeone
- Stadium: Wanda Metropolitano
- La Liga: 3rd
- Copa del Rey: Round of 16
- Supercopa de España: Semi-finals
- UEFA Champions League: Quarter-finals
- Top goalscorer: League: Ángel Correa (12); All: Ángel Correa; Luis Suárez (13 each)
- Highest home attendance: 60,594 vs Barcelona
- Lowest home attendance: 24,926 vs Elche
- Biggest win: Rayo Majadahonda 0–5 Atlético Madrid
- Biggest defeat: Barcelona 4–2 Atlético Madrid; Liverpool 2–0 Atlético Madrid; Real Madrid 2–0 Atlético Madrid; Real Sociedad 2–0 Atlético Madrid
Home colours	Away colours	Third colours

The 2021–22 season was the 115th season in the existence of Atlético Madrid and the club's 20th consecutive season in the top flight of Spanish football. In addition to the domestic league, Atlético Madrid participated in this season's editions of the Copa del Rey, the Supercopa de España, and the UEFA Champions League.

== Kits ==
Home	Home alt. 1	Home alt. 2 (Home Europe)	Away	Third	Fourth	Goalkeeper 1	Goalkeeper 2	Goalkeeper 3

== Players ==
=== First-team squad ===
As of 27 January 2022

Note: Flags indicate national team as defined under FIFA eligibility rules; some limited exceptions apply. Players may hold more than one non-FIFA nationality.

No.	Pos.	Nation	Player
1	GK	FRA	Benjamin Lecomte (on loan from Monaco)
2	DF	URU	José Giménez (3rd captain)
4	MF	CAF	Geoffrey Kondogbia
5	MF	ARG	Rodrigo De Paul
6	MF	ESP	Koke (captain)
7	FW	POR	João Félix
8	FW	FRA	Antoine Griezmann (on loan from Barcelona)
9	FW	URU	Luis Suárez
10	FW	ARG	Ángel Correa
11	MF	FRA	Thomas Lemar
12	DF	BRA	Renan Lodi

No.	Pos.	Nation	Player
13	GK	SLO	Jan Oblak (vice-captain)
14	MF	ESP	Marcos Llorente
15	DF	MNE	Stefan Savić
16	MF	MEX	Héctor Herrera
17	MF	DEN	Daniel Wass
18	DF	BRA	Felipe
19	FW	BRA	Matheus Cunha
21	MF	BEL	Yannick Carrasco
22	DF	ESP	Mario Hermoso
23	DF	MOZ	Reinildo Mandava
24	DF	CRO	Šime Vrsaljko

=== Reserve team ===
Note: Flags indicate national team as defined under FIFA eligibility rules; some limited exceptions apply. Players may hold more than one non-FIFA nationality.

No.	Pos.	Nation	Player
26	MF	ESP	Javi Serrano
27	FW	ARG	Giuliano Simeone
36	FW	ESP	Carlos Martín

=== Out on loan ===
Note: Flags indicate national team as defined under FIFA eligibility rules; some limited exceptions apply. Players may hold more than one non-FIFA nationality.

No.	Pos.	Nation	Player
—	GK	CRO	Ivo Grbić (at Lille until 30 June 2022)
—	DF	ESP	Manu Sánchez (at Osasuna until 30 June 2022)
—	DF	ARG	Nehuén Pérez (at Udinese until 30 June 2022)
—	DF	COL	Santiago Arias (at Granada until 30 June 2022)
—	MF	MAR	Abde Damar (at Espanyol B until 30 June 2022)
—	MF	ESP	Ismael Gutiérrez (at Málaga until 30 June 2022)
—	MF	URU	Juan Sanabria (at Atlético San Luis until 30 June 2022)
—	MF	ESP	Saúl (at Chelsea until 30 June 2022)

No.	Pos.	Nation	Player
—	MF	ESP	Rodrigo Riquelme (at Mirandés until 30 June 2022)
—	MF	ESP	Vitolo (at Getafe until 30 June 2022)
—	FW	ESP	Álvaro Morata (at Juventus until 30 June 2022)
—	FW	ESP	Borja Garcés (at Leganés until 30 June 2022)
—	FW	ESP	Germán Valera (at Real Sociedad B until 30 June 2022)
—	FW	POR	Marcos Paulo (at Famalicão until 30 June 2022)
—	FW	ESP	Sergio Camello (at Mirandés until 30 June 2022)
—	FW	ESP	Víctor Mollejo (at Tenerife until 30 June 2022)

== Transfers ==
=== In ===
Date	Player	From	Type	Fee	Ref.
30 June 2021	(Colombia) Santiago Arias	(Germany) Bayer Leverkusen	Loan return		
30 June 2021	(Spain) Diego Conde	Leganés	Loan return		
30 June 2021	(Argentina) Nicolás Ibáñez	(Mexico) Atlético San Luis	Loan return		
30 June 2021	(Spain) Víctor Mollejo	Mallorca	Loan return		
30 June 2021	(Spain) Javi Montero	(Turkey) Beşiktaş	Loan return		
30 June 2021	(Spain) Álvaro Morata	(Italy) Juventus	Loan return		
30 June 2021	(Argentina) Nehuén Pérez	Granada	Loan return		
30 June 2021	(Spain) Darío Poveda	Getafe	Loan return		
30 June 2021	(Spain) Rodrigo Riquelme	(England) Bournemouth	Loan return		
30 June 2021	(Spain) Manu Sánchez	Osasuna	Loan return		
30 June 2021	(Serbia) Ivan Šaponjić	Cádiz	Loan return		
30 June 2021	(Argentina) Axel Werner	(Mexico) Atlético San Luis	Loan return		
5 July 2021	(Portugal) Marcos Paulo	(Brazil) Fluminense	Transfer	Free	
12 July 2021	(Argentina) Rodrigo De Paul	(Italy) Udinese	Transfer	€35M	
19 August 2021	(France) Benjamin Lecomte	(France) Monaco	Loan		
25 August 2021	(Brazil) Matheus Cunha	(Germany) Hertha BSC	Transfer	€30M	
31 August 2021	(France) Antoine Griezmann	Barcelona	Loan		
27 January 2022	(Denmark) Daniel Wass	Valencia	Transfer	€2.5M	
31 January 2022	(Mozambique) Reinildo Mandava	(France) Lille	Transfer	Undisclosed	

=== Out ===
Date	Player	To	Type	Fee	Ref.
30 June 2021	(France) Moussa Dembélé	(France) Lyon	Loan return		
30 June 2021	(Uruguay) Lucas Torreira	(England) Arsenal	Loan return		
1 July 2021	(Argentina) Nicolás Ibáñez	(Mexico) Pachuca	Transfer	Undisclosed	
1 July 2021	(Spain) Álvaro Morata	(Italy) Juventus	Loan		
5 July 2021	(Spain) Vitolo	Getafe	Loan		
17 August 2021	(Spain) Manu Sánchez	Osasuna	Loan		
19 August 2021	(Croatia) Ivo Grbić	(France) Lille	Loan		
30 August 2021	(Colombia) Santiago Arias	Granada	Loan		
31 August 2021	(Spain) Saúl	(England) Chelsea	Loan		
7 January 2022	(England) Kieran Trippier	(England) Newcastle United	Transfer	Undisclosed	
22 January 2022	(Serbia) Ivan Šaponjić	(Slovakia) Slovan Bratislava	Transfer	Undisclosed	

== Pre-season and friendlies ==
Win Draw Loss

23 July 2021 Friendly	Numancia	1–1 (4–5 p)	Atlético Madrid	El Burgo de Osma, Spain
19:00 CEST (UTC+2)	Suárez 32'; Otero (yellow card) 86'; De Frutos (yellow card) 88'	Report	Soriano 4'; Guerrero (yellow card) 37'	Stadium: Estadio Municipal de El Burgo de Osma
	Penalties
	Muñoz (penalty missed); Martínez (penalty scored); Fernández (penalty scored); Tur (penalty missed); Gil (penalty scored); Sidibeh (penalty scored); De Frutos (penalty missed)		(penalty scored) Šaponjić; (penalty scored) Garcés; (penalty missed) Marcos Paulo; (penalty missed) Riquelme; (penalty scored) Arias; (penalty scored) Montero; (penalty scored) Camus

28 July 2021 Friendly	Red Bull Salzburg	1–0	Atlético Madrid	Wals-Siezenheim, Austria
19:45 CEST (UTC+2)	Adeyemi 34'	Report	Camus (yellow card) 23'; Saúl (yellow card) 35'	Stadium: Red Bull Arena; Attendance: 20,000

31 July 2021 Friendly	VfL Wolfsburg	1–2	Atlético Madrid	Wolfsburg, Germany
18:00 CEST (UTC+2)	Weghorst 39'; Mbabu (yellow card) 84'	Report	Simeone (yellow card) 33'; Garcés 69'; Arias (yellow card) 84'; Ricard 85', (yellow card) 89'	Stadium: AOK Stadion; Attendance: 1,750; Referee: Harm Osmers

4 August 2021 Ramón de Carranza Trophy	Cádiz	1–1 (4–2 p)	Atlético Madrid	Cádiz, Spain
20:00 CEST (UTC+2)	Alarcón (yellow card) 14'; Perea 86'	Report	Carrasco 41'; Montero (yellow card) 58'	Stadium: Nuevo Mirandilla; Referee: José Luis Munuera Montero
	Penalties
	José Mari (penalty scored); Carcelén (penalty scored); Akapo (penalty scored); Chapela (penalty scored)		(penalty missed) Saúl; (penalty scored) Kondogbia; (penalty scored) Arias; (penalty missed) Simeone

8 August 2021 Friendly	Feyenoord	2–1	Atlético Madrid	Rotterdam, Netherlands
17:00 CEST (UTC+2)	Linssen 18'; Trauner (yellow card) 45+2'; Bannis 90+3'	Report	Carrasco (red card) 41'; Correa 83'	Stadium: De Kuip; Referee: Dennis Higler

== Competitions ==
=== Overall record ===
Competition	First match	Last match	Starting round	Final position	Record							
Competition	First match	Last match	Starting round	Final position	Pld	W	D	L	GF	GA	GD	Win %
La Liga	15 August 2021	22 May 2022	Matchday 1	3rd	38	21	8	9	65	43	+22	55.26
Copa del Rey	6 January 2022	19 January 2022	Round of 32	Round of 16	2	1	0	1	5	2	+3	50.00
Supercopa de España	13 January 2022		Semi-finals	Semi-finals	1	0	0	1	1	2	−1	0.00
UEFA Champions League	15 September 2021	13 April 2022	Group stage	Quarter-finals	10	3	3	4	9	10	−1	30.00
Total					51	25	11	15	80	57	+23	49.02

Source: Soccerway

=== La Liga ===
==== League table ====
Pos	Team	Pld	W	D	L	GF	GA	GD	Pts	Qualification or relegation
1	Real Madrid (C)	38	26	8	4	80	31	+49	86	Qualification for the Champions League group stage
2	Barcelona	38	21	10	7	68	38	+30	73	Qualification for the Champions League group stage
3	Atlético Madrid	38	21	8	9	65	43	+22	71	Qualification for the Champions League group stage
4	Sevilla	38	18	16	4	53	30	+23	70	Qualification for the Champions League group stage
5	Real Betis	38	19	8	11	62	40	+22	65	Qualification for the Europa League group stage (Note: Since the winners of the 2021–22 Copa del Rey, Real Betis, qualified for European competition based on league position, the Europa League berth awarded to the Copa del Rey winners was passed to the sixth-placed team, and the Europa Conference League berth awarded to the sixth-placed team was passed to the seventh-placed team.)

Source: LaLiga Santander
Rules for classification: 1) Points; 2) Head-to-head points; 3) Head-to-head goal difference; 4) Goal difference; 5) Goals scored; 6) Fair-play points (Note: Head-to-head record is used only after all the matches between the teams in question have been played)
(C) Champions

==== Results summary ====
Overall								Home						Away					
Pld	W	D	L	GF	GA	GD	Pts	W	D	L	GF	GA	GD	W	D	L	GF	GA	GD
38	21	8	9	65	43	+22	71	12	5	2	33	16	+17	9	3	7	32	27	+5

Source: La Liga

==== Results by round ====
Round	1	2	3	4	5	6	7	8	9	10	11	12	13	14	15	16	17	18	19	20	21	22	23	24	25	26	27	28	29	30	31	32	33	34	35	36	37	38
Ground	A	H	H	A	H	A	A	H	A	H	A	H	A	H	A	H	A	A	H	A	H	H	A	H	A	H	A	H	A	H	A	H	H	A	H	A	H	A
Result	W	W	D	W	D	W	L	W	L	D	D	W	D	W	W	L	L	L	W	D	L	W	L	W	W	W	W	W	W	W	L	W	D	L	W	W	D	W
Position	4	2	5	3	2	2	4	2	4	4	6	4	4	4	2	4	4	5	4	4	5	4	5	5	5	5	4	4	4	3	4	4	4	4	4	3	3	3

Source: La Liga
A = Away; H = Home; W = Win; D = Draw; L = Loss

==== Matches ====
The league fixtures were announced on 30 June 2021.

15 August 2021 1	Celta Vigo	1–2	Atlético Madrid	Vigo
17:30 CEST (UTC+2)	Aspas 59' (pen.), (yellow card) 90+5'; Suárez (yellow card) 77'; Solari (yellow card) 86'; Fontán (yellow card) 90'; Mallo (red card) 90+5'	Report	Lemar (yellow card) 11'; Correa 23', 64'; Llorente (yellow card) 57'; Kondogbia (yellow card) 61'; Carrasco (yellow card) 90+2'; Hermoso (red card) 90+5'; Giménez (yellow card) 90+8'	Stadium: Balaídos; Attendance: 5,401; Referee: José Luis Munuera Montero

22 August 2021 2	Atlético Madrid	1–0	Elche	Madrid
19:30 CEST (UTC+2)	Correa 39'; Suárez (yellow card) 90'; Kondogbia (yellow card) 90+6'	Report	Verdú (yellow card) 65'; Benedetto (yellow card) 88'	Stadium: Wanda Metropolitano; Attendance: 24,926; Referee: Ricardo de Burgos Bengoetxea

29 August 2021 3	Atlético Madrid	2–2	Villarreal	Madrid
22:00 CEST (UTC+2)	Correa (yellow card) 28'; Lemar (yellow card) 45'; Suárez 56', (yellow card) 59'; De Paul (yellow card) 85'; Mandi 90+5' (o.g.)	Report	Trigueros 52'; Gerard (yellow card) 61'; Danjuma 74'; Rulli (yellow card) 85'	Stadium: Wanda Metropolitano; Attendance: 26,840; Referee: César Soto Grado

11 September 2021 4	Espanyol	1–2	Atlético Madrid	Cornellà de Llobregat
14:00 CEST (UTC+2)	De Tomás 40'; Melamed (yellow card) 90+11'	Report	Hermoso (yellow card) 31'; Carrasco 79', (yellow card) 90+8'; Kondogbia (yellow card) 82'; Lemar 90+9'; Félix (yellow card) 90+11'	Stadium: RCDE Stadium; Attendance: 15,321; Referee: Juan Martínez Munuera

18 September 2021 5	Atlético Madrid	0–0	Athletic Bilbao	Madrid
16:15 CEST (UTC+2)	Kondogbia (yellow card) 36'; Félix (yellow card) 78' (yellow-red card) 78'; Savić (yellow card) 79'; Cunha (yellow card) 90'	Report	D. García (yellow card) 30'; N. Williams (yellow card) 82'	Stadium: Wanda Metropolitano; Attendance: 38,798; Referee: Jesús Gil Manzano

21 September 2021 6	Getafe	1–2	Atlético Madrid	Getafe
19:30 CEST (UTC+2)	Mitrović 45'; Mata (yellow card) 65'; Aleñá (yellow card) 66', (red card) 74'; Maksimović (yellow card) 90'; Cuenca (yellow card) 90+5'	Report	Suárez (yellow card) 22', (goal) 78', 90'; Herrera (yellow card) 64'; Giménez (yellow card) 66'; Carrasco (yellow card) 90+3'; Cunha (yellow card) 90+7'	Stadium: Coliseum Alfonso Pérez; Attendance: 8,950; Referee: Guillermo Cuadra Fernández

25 September 2021 7	Alavés	1–0	Atlético Madrid	Vitoria-Gasteiz
14:00 CEST (UTC+2)	Laguardia 4'; Sylla (yellow card) 31'; Loum (yellow card) 36'	Report	Savić (yellow card) 17'; Trippier (yellow card) 53'; Kondogbia (yellow card) 55'	Stadium: Mendizorrotza; Attendance: 9,836; Referee: Antonio Mateu Lahoz

2 October 2021 8	Atlético Madrid	2–0	Barcelona	Madrid
21:00 CEST (UTC+2)	Lemar 23'; Suárez 44'; De Paul (yellow card) 45+1'; Koke (yellow card) 78'	Report	Gavi (yellow card) 20'	Stadium: Wanda Metropolitano; Attendance: 60,594; Referee: César Soto Grado

24 October 2021 10	Atlético Madrid	2–2	Real Sociedad	Madrid
21:00 CEST (UTC+2)	Felipe (yellow card) 31'; Suárez 61', 77' (pen.)	Report	Sørloth 7'; Zaldúa (yellow card) 41'; Isak 48'; Elustondo (yellow card) 68'; Merino (yellow card) 76'	Stadium: Wanda Metropolitano; Attendance: 50,032; Referee: José Luis Munuera Montero

28 October 2021 11	Levante	2–2	Atlético Madrid	Valencia
21:30 CEST (UTC+2)	Bardhi 37' (pen.), 90' (pen.); Pepelu (yellow card) 40'; Pier (yellow card) 90+6' (yellow-red card) 90+9'	Report	Griezmann 12'; Hermoso (yellow card) 18'; Felipe (yellow card) 25'; Koke (yellow card) 65'; Cunha 76'; Giménez (yellow card) 85'; Correa (yellow card) 87'	Stadium: Ciutat de València; Attendance: 16,298; Referee: Pablo González Fuertes

31 October 2021 12	Atlético Madrid	3–0	Real Betis	Madrid
16:15 CET (UTC+1)	Carrasco 26'; Pezzella 63' (o.g.); Félix 80'	Report		Stadium: Wanda Metropolitano; Attendance: 56,838; Referee: Javier Alberola Rojas

7 November 2021 13	Valencia	3–3	Atlético Madrid	Valencia
16:15 CET (UTC+1)	Savić 50' (o.g.); Guillamón (yellow card) 76'; Duro 90+2', 90+6'; Musah (yellow card) 90+4'	Report	Suárez 35'; Griezmann 58', (yellow card) 90+5'; Vrsaljko 60'; Carrasco (yellow card) 90'	Stadium: Mestalla; Attendance: 37,472; Referee: César Soto Grado

20 November 2021 14	Atlético Madrid	1–0	Osasuna	Madrid
18:30 CET (UTC+1)	Griezmann (yellow card) 45'; Felipe 87'; Martín (yellow card) 89'	Report	Torró (yellow card) 56'; D. García (yellow card) 82'	Stadium: Wanda Metropolitano; Attendance: 53,261; Referee: José María Sánchez Martínez

28 November 2021 15	Cádiz	1–4	Atlético Madrid	Cádiz
18:30 CET (UTC+1)	Fernández (yellow card) 24'; Jønsson (yellow card) 82'; Lozano 86'	Report	Lemar 56'; Griezmann 70'; Correa 76'; Cunha 86'	Stadium: Nuevo Mirandilla; Attendance: 16,861; Referee: Jesús Gil Manzano

4 December 2021 16	Atlético Madrid	1–2	Mallorca	Madrid
18:30 CET (UTC+1)	Cunha 68'; Felipe (yellow card) 79'; Lodi (yellow card) 84'	Report	Ruiz de Galarreta (yellow card) 14'; Maffeo (yellow card) 43'; Baba (yellow card) 66'; Russo 80'; Valjent (yellow card) 84'; Reina (yellow card) 89'; Kubo 90+1'	Stadium: Wanda Metropolitano; Attendance: 51,009; Referee: Juan Martínez Munuera

12 December 2021 17	Real Madrid	2–0	Atlético Madrid	Madrid
21:00 CET (UTC+1)	Benzema 16'; Mendy (yellow card) 45+1'; Asensio 57'; Alaba (yellow card) 88'	Report	Felipe (yellow card) 36'; Kondogbia (yellow card) 75'; Suárez (yellow card) 88'	Stadium: Santiago Bernabéu; Attendance: 51,024; Referee: Antonio Mateu Lahoz

18 December 2021 18	Sevilla	2–1	Atlético Madrid	Seville
21:00 CET (UTC+1)	Rakitić 7'; Rekik (yellow card) 66'; Gómez (yellow card) 68'; Montiel (yellow card) 69'; Ocampos 88'	Report	Felipe 33'; Cunha (yellow card) 36'	Stadium: Ramón Sánchez Pizjuán; Attendance: 33,241; Referee: Ricardo de Burgos Bengoetxea

22 December 2021 9	Granada	2–1	Atlético Madrid	Granada
19:00 CET (UTC+1)	Machís 17'; Molina 61'; Maximiano (yellow card) 66'; Ruiz (yellow card) 69'; Monchu (yellow card) 86'; Torrente (yellow card) 90+5'	Report	Félix 2'; De Paul (yellow card) 7'	Stadium: Nuevo Los Cármenes; Attendance: 13,034; Referee: Alejandro Hernández Hernández
Note: The match was originally scheduled for 17 October 2021, but was postponed for the 2022 FIFA World Cup qualification in South America due to postponed matches because of the COVID-19 pandemic and several players would not be able to return before the match.

2 January 2022 19	Atlético Madrid	2–0	Rayo Vallecano	Madrid
16:15 CET (UTC+1)	Suárez (yellow card) 26'; Correa 28', 53'; Giménez (yellow card) 63'; De Paul (yellow card) 73'	Report		Stadium: Wanda Metropolitano; Attendance: 43,029; Referee: Jorge Figueroa Vázquez

9 January 2022 20	Villarreal	2–2	Atlético Madrid	Villarreal
21:00 CET (UTC+1)	Gerard (penalty missed) 23'; Torres 29'; A. Moreno 58'	Report	Correa 10'; Kondogbia 67', (yellow card) 71' (yellow-red card) 90+2'	Stadium: Estadio de la Cerámica; Attendance: 14,127; Referee: Javier Alberola Rojas

22 January 2022 22	Atlético Madrid	3–2	Valencia	Madrid
21:00 CET (UTC+1)	Koke (yellow card) 27'; Hermoso (yellow card) 37', (goal) 90+3'; Cunha 64'; Suárez (yellow card) 82'; Herrera (yellow card) 84'; Correa 90+1'; Giménez (yellow card) 90+3'	Report	Correia (yellow card) 14'; Musah 25', (yellow card) 43'; Foulquier (yellow card) 37'; Duro 44'; Guillamón (yellow card) 62'; Lato (yellow card) 65'; Doménech (yellow card) 83'	Stadium: Wanda Metropolitano; Attendance: 44,999; Referee: Isidro Díaz de Mera Escuderos

6 February 2022 23	Barcelona	4–2	Atlético Madrid	Barcelona
16:15 CET (UTC+1)	Alba 10', (yellow card) 52'; Gavi 21'; Araújo 43'; Alves 49', (red card) 69'; F. de Jong (yellow card) 72'	Report	Carrasco 8'; Suárez 58'; Wass (yellow card) 89'; Herrera (yellow card) 90'	Stadium: Camp Nou; Attendance: 74,221; Referee: Jesús Gil Manzano

12 February 2022 24	Atlético Madrid	4–3	Getafe	Madrid
21:00 CET (UTC+1)	Savić (yellow card) 3'; Suárez (penalty missed) 9', (yellow card) 45+2'; Lecomte (yellow card) 13'; Correa 19', 45+4'; Cunha 27'; Koke (yellow card) 45'; Felipe (red card) 58'; Hermoso 89'	Report	Djené (yellow card) 15'; Maksimović (yellow card) 21'; Arambarri (yellow card) 22'; Mayoral 30'; Ünal 37' (pen.), 42' (pen.); Silva (yellow card) 90+5'	Stadium: Wanda Metropolitano; Attendance: 49,375; Referee: Ricardo de Burgos Bengoetxea

16 February 2022 21	Atlético Madrid	0–1	Levante	Madrid
19:00 CET (UTC+1)	De Paul (yellow card) 26'; Savić (yellow card) 85'; Correa (yellow card) 90+7'	Report	Melero 54'; Pepelu (yellow card) 70'; Gómez (yellow card) 76'; Miramón (yellow card) 85'; Son (yellow card) 90+7'	Stadium: Wanda Metropolitano; Attendance: 43,456; Referee: José Luis Munuera Montero

19 February 2022 25	Osasuna	0–3	Atlético Madrid	Pamplona
16:15 CET (UTC+1)	Ávila (yellow card) 34'	Report	Félix 3'; Vrsaljko (yellow card) 55'; Suárez 59'; Correa 89'; Serrano (yellow card) 90+1'	Stadium: El Sadar; Attendance: 20,040; Referee: Mario Melero López

26 February 2022 26	Atlético Madrid	2–0	Celta Vigo	Madrid
21:00 CET (UTC+1)	Savić (yellow card) 12'; Giménez (yellow card) 15'; Oblak (yellow card) 20'; Lodi 36', 60'; Mandava (yellow card) 50'	Report	Aspas (yellow card) 17'; Araujo (yellow card) 71'; Galhardo (yellow card) 84'	Stadium: Wanda Metropolitano; Attendance: 48,009; Referee: Alejandro Hernández Hernández

6 March 2022 27	Real Betis	1–3	Atlético Madrid	Seville
21:00 CET (UTC+1)	Iglesias (yellow card) 23'; Akouokou (yellow card) 40'; Tello 45+5', (yellow card) 71'; Bartra (yellow card) 50'; Ruibal (yellow card) 87'	Report	Félix 2', 61'; Herrera (yellow card) 34'; Carrasco (yellow card) 63'; Lemar 80'; Llorente (yellow card) 87'	Stadium: Benito Villamarín; Attendance: 44,383; Referee: Guillermo Cuadra Fernández

11 March 2022 28	Atlético Madrid	2–1	Cádiz	Madrid
21:00 CET (UTC+1)	Félix 3'; De Paul (yellow card) 30', (goal) 68'; Carrasco (yellow card) 35'; Mandava (yellow card) 41'; Serrano (red card) 88'; Savić (yellow card) 90+1'	Report	Sobrino (yellow card) 33'; Negredo 45'	Stadium: Wanda Metropolitano; Attendance: 50,573; Referee: Pablo González Fuertes

19 March 2022 29	Rayo Vallecano	0–1	Atlético Madrid	Madrid
21:00 CET (UTC+1)	Suárez (yellow card) 30'; Comesaña (yellow card) 42'; Trejo (yellow card) 65'	Report	Lodi (yellow card) 20'; Koke 49', (yellow card) 78'; Kondogbia (yellow card) 74'; Oblak (yellow card) 82'; Correa (red card) 85'; Savić (yellow card) 85'	Stadium: Campo de Fútbol de Vallecas; Attendance: 10,349; Referee: José Luis Munuera Montero

2 April 2022 30	Atlético Madrid	4–1	Alavés	Madrid
21:00 CEST (UTC+2)	Félix 11', 82'; Llorente (yellow card) 72'; Suárez 75' (pen.), 90'	Report	Escalante 63'	Stadium: Wanda Metropolitano; Attendance: 51,467; Referee: Mario Melero López

9 April 2022 31	Mallorca	1–0	Atlético Madrid	Palma
16:15 CEST (UTC+2)	Rodríguez (yellow card) 44'; Muriqi 68' (pen.)	Report	Vrsaljko (yellow card) 63'; Mandava (yellow card) 66'; Savić (yellow card) 80'; Kondogbia (yellow card) 84'	Stadium: Visit Mallorca Stadium; Attendance: 15,437; Referee: Juan Martínez Munuera

17 April 2022 32	Atlético Madrid	2–1	Espanyol	Madrid
16:15 CEST (UTC+2)	Kondogbia (yellow card) 37' (yellow-red card) 71'; Felipe (yellow card) 45'; Carrasco 52', 90+10' (pen.); Savić (yellow card) 76'; Llorente (yellow card) 88'	Report	Gil (yellow card) 30'; Di. López (yellow card) 33'; De Tomás 74'; Vilà (yellow card) 88'; Morlanes (yellow card) 90+3'; Vidal (yellow card) 90+9'	Stadium: Wanda Metropolitano; Attendance: 54,011; Referee: Jorge Figueroa Vázquez

20 April 2022 33	Atlético Madrid	0–0	Granada	Madrid
19:00 CEST (UTC+2)	Mandava (yellow card) 29'; Savić (yellow card) 45+4'; De Paul (yellow card) 78'; Vrsaljko (yellow card) 85'	Report	Quini (yellow card) 3'; Escudero (yellow card) 58'; Díaz (yellow card) 74'; Puertas (yellow card) 83'; Duarte (yellow card) 90+2'	Stadium: Wanda Metropolitano; Attendance: 43,517; Referee: Jesús Gil Manzano

30 April 2022 34	Athletic Bilbao	2–0	Atlético Madrid	Bilbao
21:00 CEST (UTC+2)	Hermoso 8' (o.g.); D. García (yellow card) 25'; I. Williams 56' (pen.), (yellow card) 68'; Berenguer (yellow card) 90+1'	Report	Hermoso (yellow card) 1'; Mandava (yellow card) 18'; Lodi (yellow card) 71'	Stadium: San Mamés; Attendance: 43,398; Referee: Antonio Mateu Lahoz

8 May 2022 35	Atlético Madrid	1–0	Real Madrid	Madrid
21:00 CEST (UTC+2)	Llorente (yellow card) 37'; Carrasco 40' (pen.); Savić (yellow card) 63'	Report	Jović (yellow card) 20'; Vázquez (yellow card) 28'; Vallejo (yellow card) 38'; Nacho (yellow card) 71'	Stadium: Wanda Metropolitano; Attendance: 63,874; Referee: César Soto Grado

11 May 2022 36	Elche	0–2	Atlético Madrid	Elche
21:30 CEST (UTC+2)	Milla (yellow card) 7'; Bigas (yellow card) 40'	Report	Cunha 28'; Lodi (yellow card) 35'; De Paul 62'; Koke (yellow card) 90+3'	Stadium: Estadio Manuel Martínez Valero; Attendance: 21,266; Referee: Pablo González Fuertes

15 May 2022 37	Atlético Madrid	1–1	Sevilla	Madrid
19:30 CEST (UTC+2)	Giménez 30'; Hermoso (yellow card) 45'; Kondogbia (yellow card) 79'; Koke (yellow card) 89'	Report	Montiel (yellow card) 41'; Gudelj (yellow card) 72'; En-Nesyri 85', (yellow card) 86'; Mir (yellow card) 88'; Acuña (yellow card) 90+5'	Stadium: Wanda Metropolitano; Attendance: 58,138; Referee: José María Sánchez Martínez

22 May 2022 38	Real Sociedad	1–2	Atlético Madrid	San Sebastián
22:00 CEST (UTC+2)	Le Normand (yellow card) 13'; Rafinha (yellow card) 36'; Merino (yellow card) 54'; Portu (yellow card) 76'; Guridi 90+3'	Report	Griezmann (yellow card) 45+2'; De Paul 50'; Correa 69'; Savić (yellow card) 90+2'	Stadium: Anoeta; Attendance: 23,586; Referee: Jesús Gil Manzano

=== Copa del Rey ===
6 January 2022 Round of 32	Rayo Majadahonda	0–5	Atlético Madrid	Madrid
21:30 CET (UTC+1)	Sánchez (yellow card) 59'	Report	Cunha 17'; Lodi 26'; Suárez 41'; Griezmann 67'; Félix 79'	Stadium: Wanda Metropolitano (Note: Rayo Majadahonda played its game at Wanda Metropolitano, in Madrid instead of their regular stadium Cerro del Espino in Majadahonda because the Royal Spanish Football Federation have granted permission for a ground change to facilitate more fans at the match.); Referee: Santiago Jaime Latre

19 January 2022 Round of 16	Real Sociedad	2–0	Atlético Madrid	San Sebastián
21:00 CET (UTC+1)	Muñoz (yellow card) 28'; Januzaj 33'; Sørloth 47'; Silva (yellow card) 59'	Report	Hermoso (yellow card) 31'; Felipe (yellow card) 39'; Cunha (yellow card) 90+2'	Stadium: Anoeta; Referee: Javier Alberola Rojas

=== Supercopa de España ===
13 January 2022 Semi-finals	Atlético Madrid	1–2	Athletic Bilbao	Riyadh, Saudi Arabia
22:00 SAST (UTC+3)	Simón 62' (o.g.); Vrsaljko (yellow card) 90+1'; Giménez (red card) 90+4'	Report	Yeray 77'; N. Williams 81'; Martínez (yellow card) 83'; Vesga (yellow card) 90'; I. Williams (yellow card) 90+1'	Stadium: King Fahd International Stadium; Attendance: 7,000; Referee: Guillermo Cuadra Fernández

=== UEFA Champions League ===
==== Group stage ====
The draw for the group stage was held on 26 August 2021.

Pos	Team	Pld	W	D	L	GF	GA	GD	Pts	Qualification	LIV	ATM	POR	MIL
1	(England) Liverpool	6	6	0	0	17	6	+11	18	Advance to knockout phase	—	2–0	2–0	3–2
2	(Spain) Atlético Madrid	6	2	1	3	7	8	−1	7	Advance to knockout phase	2–3	—	0–0	0–1
3	(Portugal) Porto	6	1	2	3	4	11	−7	5	Transfer to Europa League	1–5	1–3	—	1–0
4	(Italy) Milan	6	1	1	4	6	9	−3	4		1–2	1–2	1–1	—

Source: UEFA
Rules for classification: Group stage tiebreakers

15 September 2021 1	Atlético Madrid (Spain)	0–0	(Portugal) Porto	Madrid, Spain
21:00 CEST (UTC+2)	Félix (yellow card) 51'; Kondogbia (yellow card) 52'; Felipe (yellow card) 71'	Report	Díaz (yellow card) 16'; Sanusi (yellow card) 21'; Uribe (yellow card) 41'; Vitinha (yellow card) 67'; Corona (yellow card) 76'; Wendell (yellow card) 83'; Mbemba (red card) 90+5'	Stadium: Wanda Metropolitano; Attendance: 40,098; Referee: Ovidiu Hațegan (Romania)

28 September 2021 2	Milan (Italy)	1–2	(Spain) Atlético Madrid	Milan, Italy
21:00 CEST (UTC+2)	Kessié (yellow card) 15' (yellow-red card) 29'; Leão 20'; Rebić (yellow card) 29'; Hernandez (yellow card) 69'; Saelemaekers (yellow card) 79'	Report	Kondogbia (yellow card) 60'; Griezmann 84'; Suárez 90+7' (pen.)	Stadium: San Siro; Attendance: 35,374; Referee: Cüneyt Çakır (Turkey)

19 October 2021 3	Atlético Madrid (Spain)	2–3	(England) Liverpool	Madrid, Spain
21:00 CEST (UTC+2)	Griezmann 20', 34', (red card) 52'; Suárez (yellow card) 90+5'	Report	Salah 8', 78' (pen.); Keïta 13'; Milner (yellow card) 59'; Alexander-Arnold (yellow card) 63'	Stadium: Wanda Metropolitano; Attendance: 60,725; Referee: Daniel Siebert (Germany)

3 November 2021 4	Liverpool (England)	2–0	(Spain) Atlético Madrid	Liverpool, England
21:00 CET (UTC+1)	Jota 13', (yellow card) 85'; Mané (yellow card) 15', (goal) 21'; Matip (yellow card) 90+2'	Report	Hermoso (yellow card) 8'; Felipe (red card) 36'; Suárez (yellow card) 37'; Koke (yellow card) 38'; Félix (yellow card) 52'	Stadium: Anfield; Attendance: 51,347; Referee: Danny Makkelie (Netherlands)

24 November 2021 5	Atlético Madrid (Spain)	0–1	(Italy) Milan	Madrid, Spain
21:00 CET (UTC+1)	Llorente (yellow card) 60'	Report	Giroud (yellow card) 27'; Bakayoko (yellow card) 67'; Messias 87'; Hernandez (yellow card) 90+4'	Stadium: Wanda Metropolitano; Attendance: 61,019; Referee: Slavko Vinčić (Slovenia)

7 December 2021 6	Porto (Portugal)	1–3	(Spain) Atlético Madrid	Porto, Portugal
20:00 WET (UTC±0)	Taremi (yellow card) 32'; Otávio (yellow card) 67'; Pepe (yellow card) 69'; Wendell (red card) 70'; Marchesín (red card) 75'; Oliveira 90+6' (pen.)	Report	Griezmann 56'; Carrasco (red card) 67'; Correa (yellow card) 67', (goal) 90'; De Paul 90+2'	Stadium: Estádio do Dragão; Attendance: 38,830; Referee: Clément Turpin (France)

==== Knockout phase ====
===== Round of 16 =====
The draw for the round of 16 was held on 13 December 2021. (Note: Atlético Madrid were initially drawn against Bayern Munich.)

23 February 2022 First leg	Atlético Madrid (Spain)	1–1	(England) Manchester United	Madrid, Spain
21:00 CET (UTC+1)	Félix 7'; Herrera (yellow card) 45+1'; Mandava (yellow card) 63'; Llorente (yellow card) 77'; Giménez (yellow card) 78'	Report	Shaw (yellow card) 50'; Lindelöf (yellow card) 60'; Rashford (yellow card) 65'; Fred (yellow card) 74'; Elanga 80'; Telles (yellow card) 83'	Stadium: Wanda Metropolitano; Attendance: 63,273; Referee: Ovidiu Hațegan (Romania)

15 March 2022 Second leg	Manchester United (England)	0–1 (1–2 agg.)	(Spain) Atlético Madrid	Manchester, England
21:00 CET (UTC+1)	Matić (yellow card) 81'; Dalot (yellow card) 87'	Report	Lodi 41'; De Paul (yellow card) 43'; Herrera (yellow card) 81'	Stadium: Old Trafford; Attendance: 73,008; Referee: Slavko Vinčić (Slovenia)

===== Quarter-finals =====
The draw for the quarter-finals was held on 18 March 2022.

5 April 2022 First leg	Manchester City (England)	1–0	(Spain) Atlético Madrid	Manchester, England
20:00 BST (UTC+1)	De Bruyne 70'; Gabriel Jesus (yellow card) 85'; Ederson (yellow card) 90+2'	Report	De Paul (yellow card) 69'; Correa (yellow card) 83'; Vrsaljko (yellow card) 90+2'	Stadium: Etihad Stadium; Attendance: 52,018; Referee: István Kovács (Romania)

13 April 2022 Second leg	Atlético Madrid (Spain)	0–0 (0–1 agg.)	(England) Manchester City	Madrid, Spain
21:00 CEST (UTC+2)	Felipe (yellow card) 24' (yellow-red card) 90+1'; Llorente (yellow card) 80'; Savić (yellow card) 90+1'	Report	Rodri (yellow card) 85'; Aké (yellow card) 90+1'; Mahrez (yellow card) 90+5'; Foden (yellow card) 90+6'; Cancelo (yellow card) 90+7'	Stadium: Wanda Metropolitano; Attendance: 65,675; Referee: Daniel Siebert (Germany)
Note: Atlético Madrid manager Diego Simeone was cautioned (yellow card) in the 90+10th minute.

== Statistics ==
=== Squad statistics ===
No.	Pos	Nat	Player	Total		La Liga		Copa del Rey		Supercopa de España		Champions League	
No.	Pos	Nat	Player	Apps	Goals	Apps	Goals	Apps	Goals	Apps	Goals	Apps	Goals
Goalkeepers
1	GK	(France) FRA	Benjamin Lecomte	0	0	0	0	0	0	0	0	0	0
13	GK	(Slovenia) SLO	Jan Oblak	51	0	38	0	2	0	1	0	10	0
Defenders
2	DF	(Uruguay) URU	José Giménez	33	1	24	1	1	0	1	0	6+1	0
12	DF	(Brazil) BRA	Renan Lodi	42	4	13+16	2	2	1	0+1	0	4+6	1
15	DF	(Montenegro) MNE	Stefan Savić	33	0	28	0	0	0	0	0	5	0
17	DF	(Denmark) DEN	Daniel Wass	1	0	0+1	0	0	0	0	0	0	0
18	DF	(Brazil) BRA	Felipe	35	2	15+11	2	2	0	0	0	6+1	0
22	DF	(Spain) ESP	Mario Hermoso	34	2	21+5	2	1	0	1	0	6	0
23	DF	(Mozambique) MOZ	Reinildo Mandava	21	0	15+2	0	0	0	0	0	4	0
24	DF	(Croatia) CRO	Šime Vrsaljko	29	1	10+11	1	1+1	0	1	0	3+2	0
Midfielders
4	MF	(Central African Republic) CAF	Geoffrey Kondogbia	39	1	21+7	1	1	0	1	0	7+2	0
5	MF	(Argentina) ARG	Rodrigo De Paul	48	4	24+12	3	2	0	0+1	0	5+4	1
6	MF	(Spain) ESP	Koke	43	1	29+2	1	1+1	0	1	0	9	0
11	MF	(France) FRA	Thomas Lemar	35	4	17+7	4	1+1	0	1	0	5+3	0
14	MF	(Spain) ESP	Marcos Llorente	40	0	29	0	1	0	1	0	8+1	0
16	MF	(Mexico) MEX	Héctor Herrera	27	0	8+13	0	1	0	0+1	0	2+2	0
21	MF	(Belgium) BEL	Yannick Carrasco	44	6	28+6	6	2	0	1	0	6+1	0
26	MF	(Spain) ESP	Javi Serrano	7	0	1+4	0	0+1	0	0	0	0+1	0
Forwards
7	FW	(Portugal) POR	João Félix	35	10	13+11	8	1+1	1	1	0	7+1	1
8	FW	(France) FRA	Antoine Griezmann	36	8	21+5	3	0+1	1	0	0	6+3	4
9	FW	(Uruguay) URU	Luis Suárez	45	13	20+15	11	1+1	1	0+1	0	5+2	1
10	FW	(Argentina) ARG	Ángel Correa	49	13	21+15	12	1+1	0	1	0	3+7	1
19	FW	(Brazil) BRA	Matheus Cunha	37	7	8+21	6	1+1	1	0+1	0	0+5	0
27	FW	(Argentina) ARG	Giuliano Simeone	1	0	0+1	0	0	0	0	0	0	0
36	FW	(Spain) ESP	Carlos Martín	2	0	0+1	0	0+1	0	0	0	0	0
Players who have made an appearance this season but have left the club
8	MF	(Spain) ESP	Saúl	3	0	2+1	0	0	0	0	0	0	0
23	DF	(England) ENG	Kieran Trippier	18	0	12+3	0	0	0	0	0	3	0

=== Goalscorers ===
Rank	No.	Pos.	Nat.	Player	La Liga	Copa del Rey	Supercopa de España	Champions League	Total
1	9	FW	(Uruguay)	Luis Suárez	11	1	0	1	13
1	10	FW	(Argentina)	Ángel Correa	12	0	0	1	13
3	7	FW	(Portugal)	João Félix	8	1	0	1	10
4	8	FW	(France)	Antoine Griezmann	3	1	0	4	8
5	19	FW	(Brazil)	Matheus Cunha	6	1	0	0	7
6	21	MF	(Belgium)	Yannick Carrasco	6	0	0	0	6
7	5	MF	(Argentina)	Rodrigo De Paul	3	0	0	1	4
7	11	MF	(France)	Thomas Lemar	4	0	0	0	4
7	12	DF	(Brazil)	Renan Lodi	2	1	0	1	4
10	18	DF	(Brazil)	Felipe	2	0	0	0	2
10	22	DF	(Spain)	Mario Hermoso	2	0	0	0	2
12	2	DF	(Uruguay)	José Giménez	1	0	0	0	1
12	4	MF	(Central African Republic)	Geoffrey Kondogbia	1	0	0	0	1
12	6	MF	(Spain)	Koke	1	0	0	0	1
12	24	DF	(Croatia)	Šime Vrsaljko	1	0	0	0	1
Own goals					2	0	1	0	3
Totals					65	5	1	9	80
