= Juan Aguilera =

Juan Aguilera may refer to:

- Juan Aguilera (Chilean footballer) (1903–1979), Chilean footballer
- Juan Miguel Aguilera (born 1960), Spanish writer
- Juan Aguilera (tennis) (1962–2025), Spanish tennis player
- Juan Aguilera (Spanish footballer) (born 1985), Spanish footballer
