= Stephanie Sequeira =

American bodybuilder

Stephanie Sequeira (born June 30, 1993) is an American professional bodybuilder, model, personal trainer, and bodybuilding coach.

== Background ==
Sequeira was born in Medellin, Colombia to Cuban emigrants, Jose and Olga. The family moved to Venezuela shortly after birth. Sequeria spent four years running varsity track and cross-country in High School.

Sequeira became interested in bodybuilding and fitness modeling in college and began her first coached offseason in January 2014. In May 2014, she graduated from college with a bachelor's degree in Psychology. Over the next two years, she worked on her Masters of Science in Human Resources while continuing to compete in National Physique Committee and International Federation of Bodybuilding and Fitness Pro shows.

Sequeira became a professional IFBB Bikini athlete in November 2015 at the NPC National Championships in Miami. She trained at LA Fitness, XSport, and the Quads Gym in Chicago, IL while preparing for this contest. She has become Blackstone Labs sponsored athlete.

Sequeira is also a bodybuilding coach specializing in the Bikini Division. In this regard, she is an assistant coach on Team Long.

== Competitions ==
=== NPC Amateur ===
- Ancient City Classic 2015 - 2nd in Class
- Dextor Jackson Classic 2015 - 1st in Class
- NPC Junior National Championships 2015 - 16th in Class
- Wings of Strength Model Search, Chicago 2015 - 1st
- NPC National Championships 2015 - 1st in Class; earned pro card.

=== IFBB Pro Competitions ===
2016

- IFBB Prestige Crystal Cup - August 8, 2016 - 12th
- Naples Bikini Pro - August 27, 2016 - 11th
- Coastal USA's 2016 - November 27, 2016 - 13th

2017

- Optimum Classic - May 20, 2017 - 5th
- Omaha Pro - June 9, 2017 - 8th
- Ft. Lauderdale Cup - July 6, 2017 - 10th
- Chicago Pro - July 13, 2017 - 16th
- Iron Games - November 11, 2017 - 16th
- Ferrigno Legacy Pro - November 18, 2017 - 10th
