= Fabrizio Romano =

Italian sports journalist (born 1993)

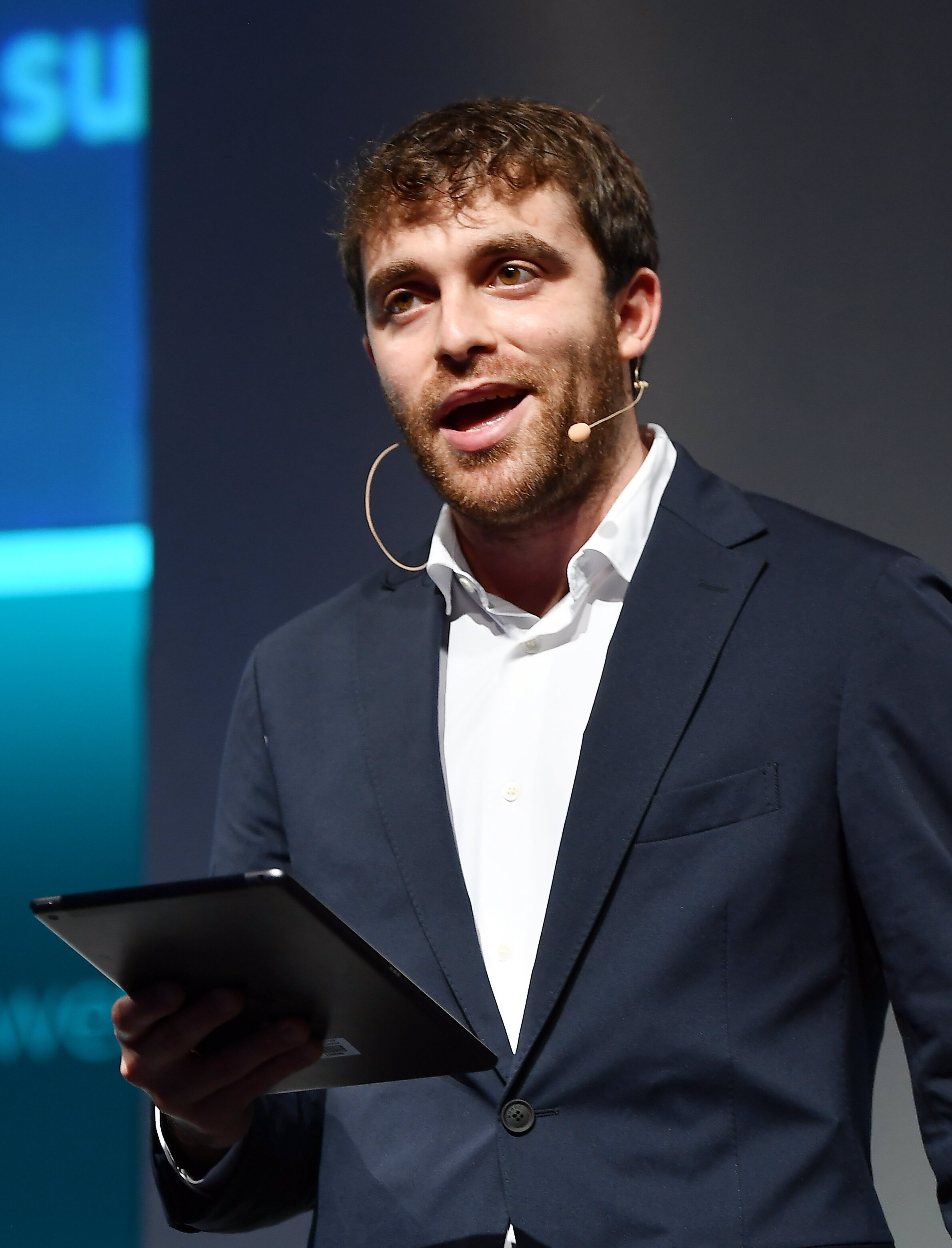
- Romano in 2021
- Born: 21 February 1993 (age 33); Naples, Italy
- Education: Università Cattolica del Sacro Cuore
- Occupation: Sports journalist
- Years active: 2011–present

YouTube information
- Channel: Fabrizio Romano
- Years active: 2021–present
- Genre: Association football
- Subscribers: 3.3 million
- Views: 479.5 million
- Last updated: 8 September 2026

Fabrizio Romano (born 21 February 1993) is an Italian sports journalist and influencer. He is primarily known for his football transfer news.

== Early and personal life ==
Romano was born in Naples on 21 February 1993 and attended Università Cattolica del Sacro Cuore in Milan. He is able to speak English, Spanish, and Italian. Romano is a supporter of English club Watford.

== Career ==
=== Beginnings ===
Romano began his career in football journalism in 2009 while still in high school, writing football news for FcInterNews.it. His breakthrough came in 2011 when he received insider information from an Italian agent in Barcelona about then-Barcelona youth player Mauro Icardi. Romano joined Sky Sport Italy in 2012, where he established extensive connections with clubs, agents, and intermediaries throughout Europe. He also contributes to The Guardian and CBS Sports and is based in Milan.

=== Recognition ===
Romano is known for his catchphrase "Here we go!", used to signal the confirmation of a transfer deal. According to 90min, he is considered one of the most reliable sources in the field of football transfers. His credibility and substantial social media following have led several football clubs to involve him in player announcement videos. In 2022, Romano was featured in the European Forbes 30 Under 30 list for media and marketing. He also received the Best Football Journalist award at the 2022 Globe Soccer Awards and the Best Digital Journalist award at the 2023 edition. His likeness and social media has been included in the video game series EA Sports FC, since the 2024 installment, FC 25, along with his signature catchphrase.

=== Criticisms ===
On 7 February 2023, he reported that Christian Atsu had been rescued alive from the rubble following the 2023 Turkey–Syria earthquakes; the claim was later found to be inaccurate, as he reportedly died the day before.

In February 2024, Tipsbladet reported that certain documentation had been obtained showing Romano's associated company had approached various football clubs, including those in Denmark, offering paid mentions on his social media platforms. Later in 2024, the Danish Press Council (Pressenævnet) criticised Tipsbladet's coverage, ruling it breached press ethics, and the outlet subsequently removed the article and issued a correction.

In March 2026, Romano promoted the charitable work of the authoritarian regime in Saudi Arabia, drawing criticism from The Telegraph. Romano has also been criticized for his promotional coverage of Mason Greenwood, who was released by Manchester United after he was charged with attempted rape, assault occasioning actual bodily harm, and controlling and coercive behaviour.

In July 2026, Romano was criticised by Florian Plettenberg from Sky Sport Germany, with Plettenberg claiming that Romano's report of a transfer between Yan Diomande and Real Madrid was false. Diomande later transferred to Real Madrid from RB Leipzig.
