= Ana María Aguilera =

Spanish statistician

Ana María Aguilera del Pino is a Spanish statistician whose research involves principal component analysis, functional data analysis, categorical data, and multi-dimensional contingency tables. She is University Professor in the Department of Statistics and Operations Research at the University of Granada.

== Education and career ==
Aguilera earned a Ph.D. at the University of Granada in 1993. Her doctoral dissertation, Métodos de aproximación de estimadores en el ACP de un proceso estocástico, was supervised by Mariano José Valderrama Bonnet.

She was named University Professor at the University of Granada in 2012. She was editor-in-chief of the Bulletin of Statistics and Operations Research, the academic journal of the Spanish Statistics and Operations Research Society, from 2013 to 2017.

== Books ==
Aguilera is the author of two Spanish-language books on contingency tables:

- Tablas de Contingencia Bidimensionales (2001)
- Modelización de Tablas de Contingencia Multidimensionales (2006)

== Recognition ==
Aguilera is an elected member of the International Statistical Institute.
