= Adélia Sequeira =

Portuguese applied mathematician

Adélia da Costa Sequeira is a Portuguese applied mathematician specializing in the mathematical modeling of blood flow and the circulatory system. She is a professor of mathematics at the Instituto Superior Técnico, part of the University of Lisbon, where she is coordinator for the Scientific Area on Numerical Analysis and Applied Analysis and director of the Research Center for Computational and Stochastic Mathematics.

== Education ==
Sequeira earned a doctorat de troisième cycle in France in 1981, at Pierre and Marie Curie University, in numerical analysis. Her dissertation, Couplage entre la méthode des éléments finis et la méthode des équations integrales: application au problème de Stokes stationnaire dans le plan, was supervised by Jean-Claude Nédélec. She has a second doctorate in mathematics, earned in 1985 at the University of Lisbon, where she also earned a habilitation in 2001.

== Books ==
Sequeira is a coauthor of the book Hemomath: the Mathematics of Blood (Springer, 2017), and is the editor of several edited volumes.

== Recognition ==
She is a corresponding member of the Lisbon Academy of Sciences, elected in 2018.
