= Diego de Aguilar =

Spanish painter

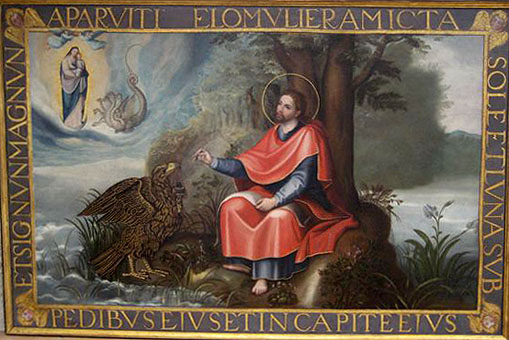
Diego de Aguilar picture

Diego de Aguilar (active 1587) was a Spanish painter, of the Renaissance period, active in Toledo. He painted mainly devotional works. Surviving information on the Toledan painter Diego de Aguilar is both scant and confused. With regard to his own artistic activities, his first documented work dates from 1597 when he was commissioned to paint and gild the monstrance in the parish church in Magán (Toledo). The Baptism of Christ in the monastery of San Clemente is Diego de Aguilar's earliest known painting. Diego de Aguilar deployed an archaic style in his paintings, including the application of gold leaf to the figures’ clothing. Works such as The Baptism of Christ and Saint John on Patmos (Toledo, monastery of San Clemente) reveal the influence of his activities as an illuminator and decorator in the careful rendering of details and precise technique. This is also evident in the taste for detail evident in his still lifes, explaining the comparison that has been made between him and Juan Sánchez Cotán. All these characteristics are clearly evident in the paintings for the Franciscan convent of the Conception in Toledo.
