= Marcos Llorente =

Spanish footballer (born 1995)

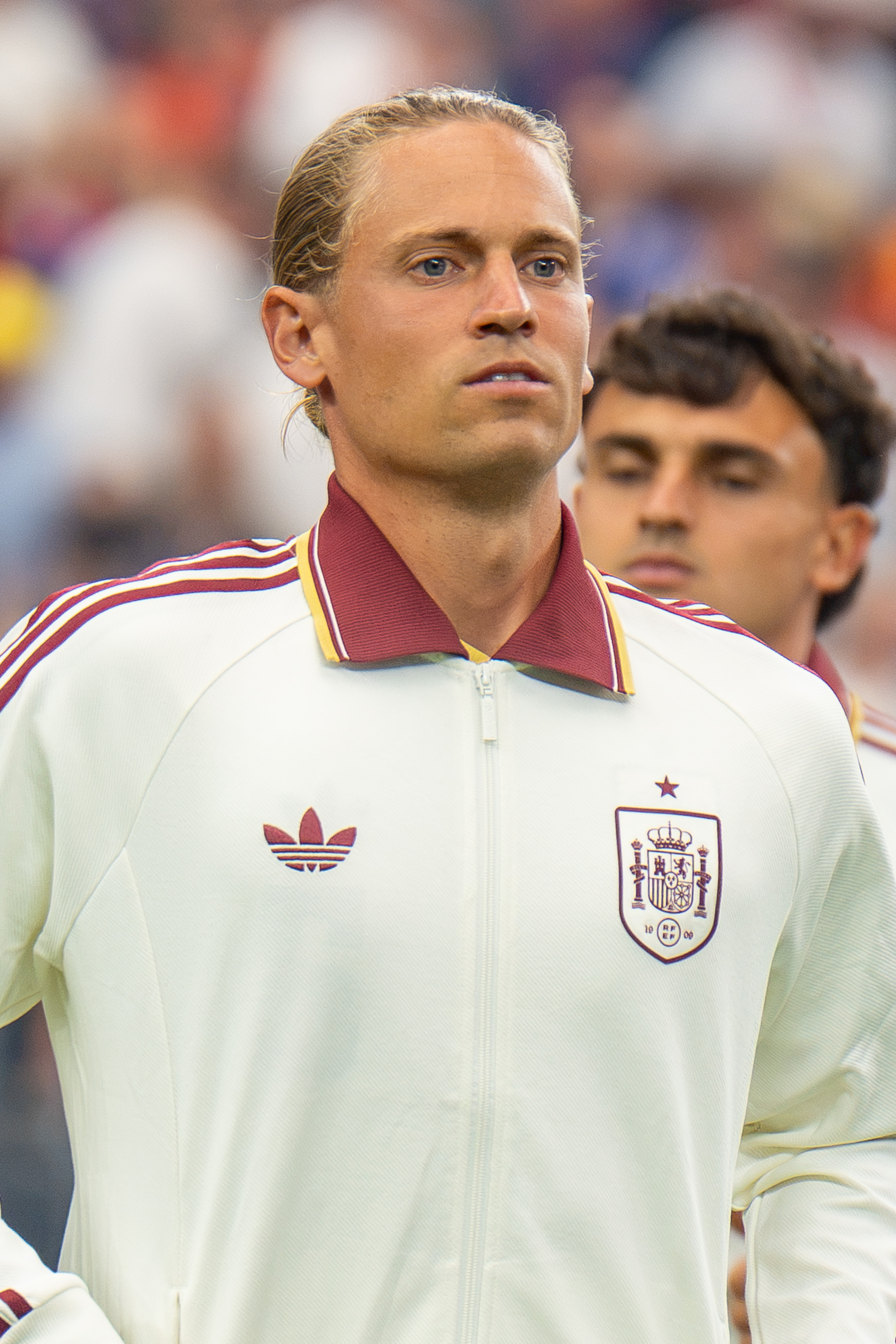
- Llorente with Spain in 2026

Personal information
- Full name: Marcos Llorente Moreno
- Date of birth: 30 January 1995 (age 31)
- Place of birth: Madrid, Spain
- Height: 1.84 m (6 ft 0 in)
- Positions: Midfielder; right-back

Team information
- Current team: Atlético Madrid
- Number: 14

Youth career
- 2002–2006: Las Rozas
- 2006–2007: Nueva Roceña
- 2007–2008: Rayo Majadahonda
- 2008–2014: Real Madrid

Senior career*
Years	Team	Apps	(Gls)
2014–2016	Real Madrid B	58	(3)
2015–2019	Real Madrid	22	(0)
2016–2017	→ Alavés (loan)	32	(0)
2019–	Atlético Madrid	229	(24)

International career
2014	Spain U19	4	(0)
2016–2017	Spain U21	9	(0)
2020–2026	Spain	27	(0)
Medal record
Men's football
Representing Spain
FIFA World Cup
Winner	2026 Canada–Mexico–US
UEFA European Championship
Bronze medal – third place	2020 Europe
UEFA European Under-21 Championship
Runner-up	2017 Poland
- * Club domestic league appearances and goals as of 17:15, 22 November 2026 (UTC)

Marcos Llorente Moreno (born 30 January 1995) is a Spanish professional footballer who plays as a midfielder or right-back for La Liga club Atlético Madrid.

Developed at Real Madrid, he appeared in 39 competitive matches over three seasons, also serving a loan at Alavés. He signed with Atlético Madrid in June 2019, winning the 2020–21 La Liga while being deployed in several positions.

Llorente made his full debut for Spain in 2020, and was part of the squads at UEFA Euro 2020 and two FIFA World Cups, winning the 2026 edition of the latter tournament.

== Club career ==
=== Real Madrid ===
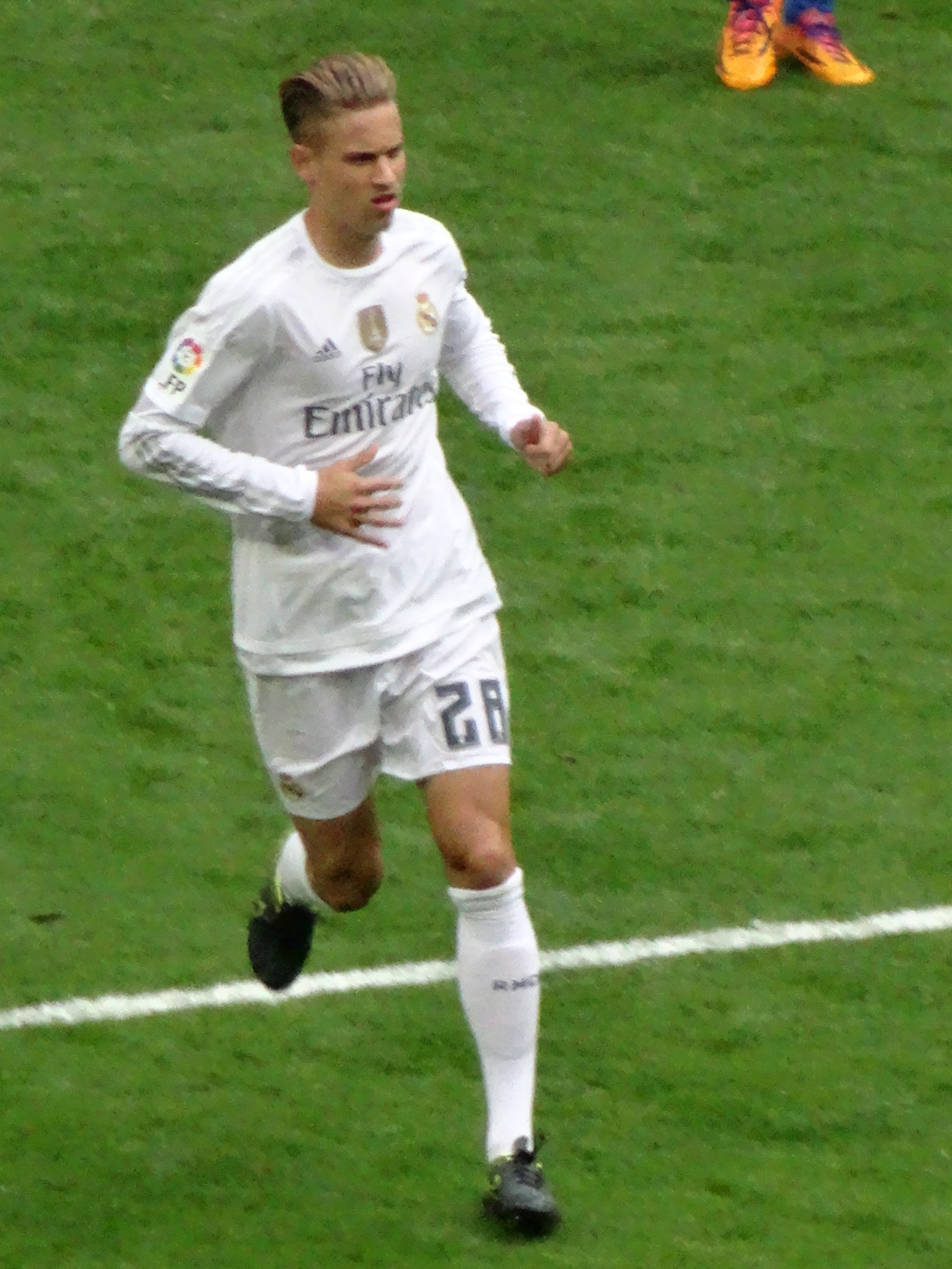
Llorente playing for Real Madrid in 2015

Born in Madrid, Llorente joined Real Madrid's youth setup in 2008, aged 13. In July 2014, after impressing with the Juvenil squad, he was promoted straight to the reserves by manager Zinedine Zidane.

On 24 August 2014, Llorente made his senior debut, starting in a 2–1 away loss against Atlético Madrid B in the Segunda División B. He appeared in 25 matches during the campaign, totalling 1,637 minutes of action.

Llorente spent the 2015 pre-season with the first team, appearing in friendlies against Manchester City, Inter Milan and Vålerenga. He made his professional – and La Liga – debut on 17 October of that year, coming on as a second-half substitute for Mateo Kovačić in the 3–0 home win over Levante.

On 10 August 2016, Llorente was loaned to Alavés for the season. On 10 September, he featured the full 90 minutes in a 2–1 victory at Barcelona.

On 23 September 2017, Llorente's contract was extended until 2021. He made one appearance in that campaign's UEFA Champions League, when Madrid won their third consecutive and 13th overall title in the tournament.

Llorente had played just 11 minutes in 2018–19 until late November, when Casemiro dropped out with an ankle injury. Interim coach Santiago Solari handed the former his first starts as a defensive midfielder, and he scored his first competitive goal for the team on 22 December, the second in the 4–1 defeat of Al Ain in the final of the FIFA Club World Cup to earn him player of the match honours.

At the start of 2019, Llorente was sidelined with adductor problems. During his recovery, Solari was replaced by Zidane, who preferred to use Federico Valverde in the holding midfielder role; additionally, Zidane stated that the player needed "more first-team minutes" in order to improve.

=== Atlético Madrid ===
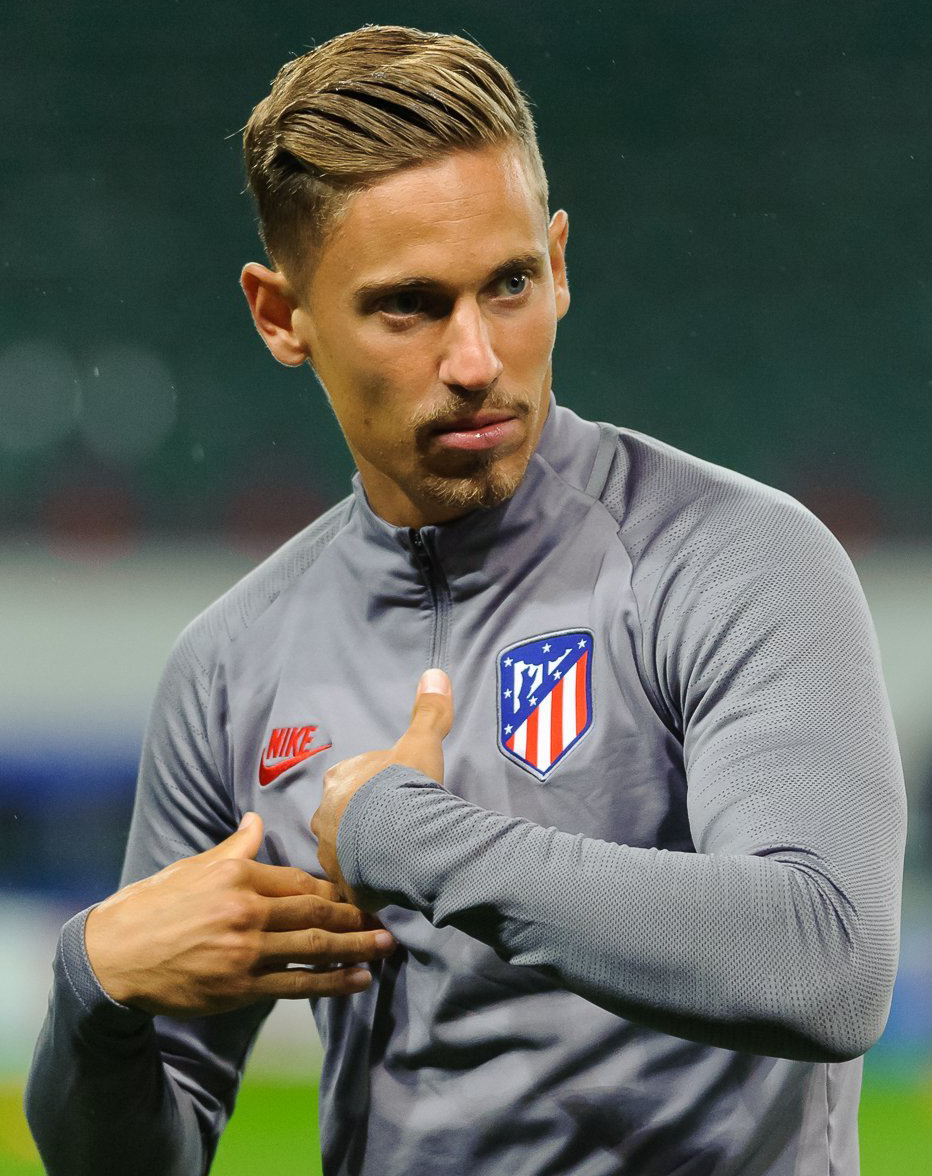
Llorente with Atlético Madrid in 2019

On 20 June 2019, Llorente was signed by local rivals Atlético Madrid on a five-year contract for a reported fee of £35 million; he was given shirt number 14, previously worn by Rodri who left for Manchester City during the same transfer window. He made his official debut on 18 August, playing 25 minutes in the 1–0 home win against Getafe.

In the first half of his debut campaign, Llorente was among the Atlético squad members with the fewest playing time. He became a regular starter in January 2020, scoring his first goal on 14 February when he put his team ahead in a 2–2 draw at Valencia.

On 11 March 2020, during extra time of the Champions League round-of-16 tie away to defending champions Liverpool, Llorente scored twice to tie the match 2–2 after replacing Diego Costa early into the second half, in an eventual 3–2 victory and qualification. On 17 June, he came off the bench in the 63rd minute to be named man of the match in the league game at Osasuna, scoring a solo goal and later assisting twice in the 5–0 rout.

Llorente scored a career-best 12 times in 2020–21 (second-best in the squad behind Luis Suárez's 21), adding 11 assists as the Colchoneros were crowned champions after a seven-year drought; in the process, he became the club's first player to register double digits in both categories since Diego Forlán in 2008–09.

== International career ==
Llorente with Spain at the 2026 FIFA World Cup

Llorente earned his first cap for the Spain under-21 side on 10 October 2016, featuring the entire 5–0 home defeat of Estonia in the 2017 UEFA European Under-21 Championship qualifiers, in Pontevedra. He was called up to the senior squad in November 2020, for a friendly with the Netherlands and UEFA Nations League qualifiers against Switzerland and Germany. He made his first appearance against the first opponent, replacing Sergio Canales for the last 18 minutes of the 1–1 draw in Amsterdam.

On 24 May 2021, Llorente was included in Spain's 24-man squad for UEFA Euro 2020. He was deployed as a right-back during the tournament.

Llorente was also picked for the 2022 FIFA World Cup. He only took part in one match in Qatar, the 3–0 penalty shootout loss against Morocco in the last 16.

Llorente was part of a 29-man preliminary squad for UEFA Euro 2024. However, he did not make the final cut.

On 25 May 2026, Llorente was selected for the year's World Cup. In the final group fixture, he assisted Álex Baena for the only goal in a win over Uruguay in Zapopan; he made three appearances for the champions, including two starts.

Llorente announced his international retirement in September 2026.

== Style of play ==
Originally a defensive midfielder or a playmaker in front of a back four, Llorente is also capable of playing in more advanced positions such as a central or box-to-box midfielder. At Atlético Madrid, under coach Diego Simeone, he was also fielded out of his regular position, first on the right side of the midfield in a 4–4–2 formation and later as a supporting forward in the same system.

At the conclusion of 2019–20, Llorente was the sixth fastest player in the competition, with his top running speed being recorded at 35.09 km/h. Apart from his physical attributes, such as pace, height, body fitness and stamina, his strengths also included excellent ball winning skills, visionary passing over both short and long distances, dribbling, first touch and shooting from just outside the penalty area, which led him to score several goals. The following season, as Atlético went through a tactical switch, he was usually deployed as either a box-to-box or an attacking midfielder in a 5–3–2 or 3–4–2–1 formations. On occasion, he also filled in as a right wingback for his club, or a right-back in a four-man defence for the national team.

For his training attitude and patience, Llorente was praised by Simeone and Jorge Valdano.

== Personal life ==
A boyhood supporter of Real Madrid, Llorente has ties in his family to both football and the club. His father Francisco and great uncle Francisco Gento were wingers, while his maternal grandfather Ramón Grosso was a forward.

In June 2013, Llorente began dating influencer Patricia "Paddy" Noarbe, who he met in high school. In July 2021, they were engaged in the Metropolitano Stadium, Atlético Madrid's home stadium. On 30 June 2023, they married at La Fortaleza in Pollença, Mallorca. On 12 September 2024, Llorente and Noarbe announced that they were expecting their first child, and revealed on 17 September that they were expecting a daughter. She was born on 13 February 2025. On 10 November 2026, they announced that they were expecting their second child, and revealed six days later that they were expecting a son.

In 2023, Llorente and former footballer Ibai Gómez co-founded the specialty coffee brand Irreverentes. In July 2024, after Llorente promoted the brand on social media, its logo drew criticism from social media users for its resemblance to the insignia of the Schutzstaffel, a paramilitary organisation of the Nazi Party.

Late in his career, Llorente drew public scrutiny and examination for promoting unconventional health practices, including a strict paleolithic diet and anti-science views on sun exposure and skin cancer, eliciting criticism from medical professionals and the media. He has also expressed belief in the chemtrail conspiracy theory.

== Career statistics ==
=== Club ===
As of match played 22 November 2026

Appearances and goals by club, season and competition
Club	Season	League			Copa del Rey		Europe		Other		Total	
Club	Season	Division	Apps	Goals	Apps	Goals	Apps	Goals	Apps	Goals	Apps	Goals
Real Madrid B	2014–15	Segunda División B	25	0	—		—		—		25	0
Real Madrid B	2015–16	Segunda División B	33	3	—		—		4 (Note: Appearances in Segunda División B play-offs)	0	37	3
Real Madrid B	Total		58	3	—		—		4	0	62	3
Real Madrid	2015–16	La Liga	2	0	1	0	0	0	—		3	0
Real Madrid	2017–18	La Liga	13	0	6	0	1 (Note: Appearance(s) in UEFA Champions League)	0	0	0	20	0
Real Madrid	2018–19	La Liga	7	0	5	1	2	0	2 (Note: Appearances in FIFA Club World Cup)	1	16	2
Real Madrid	Total		22	0	12	1	3	0	2	1	39	2
Alavés (loan)	2016–17	La Liga	32	0	6	0	—		—		38	0
Atlético Madrid	2019–20	La Liga	29	3	1	0	4	2	2 (Note: Appearance(s) in Supercopa de España)	0	36	5
Atlético Madrid	2020–21	La Liga	37	12	0	0	8	1	—		45	13
Atlético Madrid	2021–22	La Liga	29	0	1	0	9	0	1	0	40	0
Atlético Madrid	2022–23	La Liga	22	1	4	2	3	0	—		29	3
Atlético Madrid	2023–24	La Liga	37	6	5	0	9	0	1	0	52	6
Atlético Madrid	2024–25	La Liga	33	2	5	1	8	2	3	0	49	5
Atlético Madrid	2025–26	La Liga	29	0	5	0	14	4	1	0	49	4
Atlético Madrid	2026–27	La Liga	13	0	0	0	4	1	0	0	17	1
Atlético Madrid	Total		229	24	21	3	59	10	8	0	317	37
Career total			341	27	39	4	62	10	14	1	456	42

=== International ===
Appearances and goals by national team and year
National team	Year	Apps	Goals
Spain	2020	1	0
Spain	2021	11	0
Spain	2022	6	0
Spain	2023	0	0
Spain	2024	1	0
Spain	2025	3	0
Spain	2026	5	0
Total		27	0

== Honours ==
Real Madrid

- UEFA Champions League: 2017–18
- FIFA Club World Cup: 2017, 2018

Atlético Madrid

- La Liga: 2020–21
- Copa del Rey runner-up: 2025–26

Spain U21

- UEFA European Under-21 Championship runner-up: 2017

Spain

- FIFA World Cup: 2026

Individual

- La Liga Team of the Season: 2025–26
- UEFA Champions League Team of the Season: 2025–26

== See also ==
- List of Atlético Madrid players
- List of Real Madrid CF players
