= Germán Sequeira =

Nicaraguan politician

Mayor of El Sauce, León, Nicaragua
- Preceded by: Aquilino Aquedano
- Succeeded by: N/A
- In office 1924–1925
- In office 1945–1946

Personal details
- Born: 1884 El Sauce, León, Nicaragua
- Died: January 19, 1951 (aged 66–67) El Sauce, León, Nicaragua
- Party: Partido Liberal

Germán Sequeira Aguilera (1884 – January 19, 1951) was a Nicaraguan politician. He was the 79th and 82nd mayor of El Sauce, León, Nicaragua and a former deputy in the National Assembly of Nicaragua.

== Career ==
Before he was mayor, Sequeira attended medical school at the National Autonomous University of Nicaragua. He was appointed treasurer to the Road Board (Junta de Carreteras) for a route from El Sauce to El Ocotal about 1921.

Sequeira was the 79th and 82nd mayor of El Sauce, León, Nicaragua from 1924-1925 and again in 1945-1946.

In 1944, he was appointed treasurer to the Local Road Board (Junta Local de Caminos) of El Sauce, in the Department of León.

He was also deputy in the National Assembly of Nicaragua during the presidency of José Maria Moncada and vice deputy during the presidency of Juan Bautista Sacasa.

== Personal life and death ==
Sequeira was married to Graciela Delgado. Together, they had two children, Sabina and Germán. When Graciela died, Sequeira married second wife, Emerita Chavarria. They had eight children, Salvadora, Tomás, Noel, Maria de Lourdes, Pedro Alcides, Jesus, Anita, and Eli.

Germán Sequeira died on January 19, 1951, in El Sauce.
