= Deaths in February 2005 =

The following is a list of The following is a list of notable deaths in February 2005.

Entries for each day are listed alphabetically by surname. A typical entry lists information in the following sequence:

- Name, age, country of citizenship at birth, subsequent country of citizenship (if applicable), reason for notability, cause of death (if known), and reference.

== February 2005 ==
=== 1 ===
- Werner Arnold, 74, Swiss cyclist.
- John D. Bennett, 93, American politician and judge.
- Jean Chapdelaine, 91, Canadian diplomat
- James August Comiskey, 78, American district judge (United States District Court for the Eastern District of Louisiana).
- Edward D. Freis, 92, American physician.
- Andreas Heckmair, 98, Austrian mountaineer, made first ascent of the Eiger north face.
- Franco Mannino, 80, Italian film and classical composer.
- Christian Talli, 87, French swimmer and Olympian (1936).
- John Vernon, 72, Canadian-American actor (Animal House, Dirty Harry, The Outlaw Josey Wales), surgical complications.
- Richard Wolfson, 49, British musician and journalist, aortic aneurysm.

=== 2 ===
- Ali Mustafa Baghdady, 82, Egyptian air force commander and Olympic swimmer (1948).
- Birgitte Federspiel, 79, Danish actress (Babette's Feast).
- Anders Hveem, 80, Norwegian Olympic bobsledder (1952).
- Lee Hyeonggi, 72, South Korean poet.
- Miklós Kovacsics, 51, Hungarian Olympic handball player (1980).
- Svein Kvia, 57, Norwegian footballer, brain cancer.
- Goffredo Lombardo, 84, Italian film producer.
- Magomed Omarov, Russian politician, deputy Interior Minister of Dagestan, homicide.
- Max Schmeling, 99, German world heavyweight boxing champion.
- Yvonne Sherman, 74, American figure skater and Olympian (1948).
- Jerzy Wojnar, 74, Polish pilot and Olympic luger (1964, 1968).
- Edward Maitland Wright, 98, British mathematician.

=== 3 ===
- Corrado Bafile, 101, Italian cardinal.
- Mamdooh El-Attar, 78, Egyptian Olympic rower (1952).
- Louis Gillis, 80, American baseball player.
- Raymond Laurent, 87, Belgian herpetologist.
- Karl Linn, 81, American landscape architect and psychologist.
- Andreas Makris, 74, Greek-American composer and violinist.
- Jean-Jacques Martel, 78, Canadian politician, member of the House of Commons of Canada (1958-1962).
- Ernst Mayr, 100, German-American evolutionary biologist.
- James Patrick Sutton, 89, American politician, U.S. Representative from Tennessee (1949–1955).
- Zurab Zhvania, 41, Georgian politician, Prime Minister of Georgia (2004-2005), carbon monoxide poisoning.

=== 4 ===
- Ossie Davis, 87, American actor (Do the Right Thing, Evening Shade, The Client) and activist.
- Alfio Fontana, 72, Italian football player.
- Elia Frosio, 92, Italian cyclist.
- Stephen R. Gregg, 90, United States Army soldier and recipient the Medal of Honor.
- Peter Heine, 76, South African cricket player.
- Malcolm Kutner, 83, American football player (Texas Longhorns, Chicago Cardinals).
- Dorothy Locke, 93, American fencer and Olympian (1932, 1936).
- Danas Pozniakas, 65, Lithuanian amateur light-heavyweight boxer and Olympic champion (1968).
- Luis Sánchez, 51, Venezuelan Major League baseball player (Los Angeles Angels of Anaheim).

=== 5 ===
- Bob Brannum, 79, American basketball player (Sheboygan Red Skins, Boston Celtics), pancreatic cancer.
- Jean-Charles Cantin, 86, Canadian politician, member of the House of Commons of Canada (1962-1972).
- Étienne Gnassingbé Eyadéma, 67, Togolese politician, president of Togo (1967-2005), heart attack.
- Gerard Glaister, 89, British television producer and director.
- Veikko Helle, 93, American politician.
- Günter Reimann, 100, German economist.
- Henri Rochon, 80, Canadian tennis player.
- Sandra Valenti, 65, Italian sprinter and Olympian (1960).
- Michalina Wisłocka, 84, Polish sexologist.

=== 6 ===
- Michael Adams, 85, British journalist.
- Billy Baker, 84, Welsh footballer.
- Lazar Berman, 74, Russian classical pianist.
- Elbert N. Carvel, 94, American politician, Governor of Delaware.
- Adu Celso, 59, Brazilian motorcycle road racer, heart attack.
- Hubert Curien, 80, French researcher, first president of European Space Agency.
- Vasily Fedin, 78, Soviet Russian Olympic cyclist (1952).
- Alejandro Gómez, 96, Argentine educator and lawyer, stroke.
- Karl Haas, 91, American classical music radio program host.
- Merle Kilgore, 70, American country music manager and songwriter, heart failure.
- Mutsuo Minagawa, 69, Japanese baseball pitcher.
- Jack Webster, 88, Australian Olympic rower (1948).

=== 7 ===
- Laurie Aarons, 87, Australian politician.
- Nedžad Botonjič, 27, Slovenian footballer.
- Atli Dam, 72, Faroese politician, Prime Minister of the Faroe Islands (1991-1993).
- Leonid Gissen, 73, Russian rower and Olympic medalist (1952, 1956).
- Shep Mayer, 81, Canadian ice hockey player (Toronto Maple Leafs).
- Dennis McCord, 52, Canadian ice hockey player (Vancouver Canucks).
- V. C. Pande, 72, Indian political figure, former governor of three states.
- John Patterson, 64, American television director (The Sopranos, Hill Street Blues, Providence), prostate cancer.
- Paul Rebeyrolle, 78, French painter.
- Madeleine Rebérioux, 84, French historian.
- Narayan Sanyal, 80, Indian writer of modern Bengali literature.
- Jeremy Swan, 82, Irish cardiologist, co-inventor of the pulmonary artery catheter, heart attack.
- Bob Turner, 71, Canadian ice hockey player (Montreal Canadiens, Chicago Blackhawks).
- Zdravko Velimirović, 74, Yugoslavian film director and screenwriter.

=== 8 ===
- Gildo Arena, 83, Italian water polo player, swimmer and Olympic champion (1948, 1952).
- Mike Bishop, 46, American baseball player (New York Mets).
- Germund Dahlquist, 80, Swedish mathematician.
- Edward R. Dudley, 93, American diplomat.
- Helmut Eder, 88, Austrian composer.
- Parker Hall, 88, American gridiron football player (Cleveland Rams, San Francisco 49ers).
- George Herman, 85, American journalist and moderator of CBS' Face the Nation for 15 years.
- Keith Knudsen, 56, American drummer for rock band Doobie Brothers, pneumonia.
- Gaston Rahier, 58, Belgian 125cc Motocross World Champion (1975–1977), cancer.
- Jimmy Smith, 76, American jazz organist.
- Javier Tusell, 59, Spanish historian, writer and politician, leukemia.

=== 9 ===
- Tim Breslin, 37, American ice hockey player, appendix cancer.
- Tyrone Davis, 67, American R&B singer (Turn Back The Hands Of Time), complications of a stroke.
- Gustav Gocke, 85, German Olympic wrestler (1952).
- Robert Kearns, 77, American inventor of intermittent windshield wipers, brain cancer.
- Frank Klausen, 44, Danish footballer.
- Raisa Kyrychenko, 61, Ukrainian mezzo-soprano singer, cardiovascular disease.
- Richard Lupino, 75, American actor, member of the theatrical Lupino family, lymphoma.
- Frank Mathers, 80, Canadian ice hockey player (Toronto Maple Leafs, Hershey Bears).
- Paulistinha, 65, Brazilian footballer and manager.
- Kate Peyton, 39, British BBC producer, shot in Mogadishu, Somalia.
- Sylvia Rafael, 67, South African-born Israeli Mossad agent convicted of 1973 Lillehammer murder, leukemia.
- Josef Rasselnberg, 92, German football player and trainer.
- Gary Schull, 60, American basketball player (Florida State Seminoles, Fortitudo Bologna).
- Dariusz Świerczewski, 68, Polish Olympic basketball player (1960).

=== 10 ===
- Humbert Balsan, 50, French film producer, suicide by hanging.
- David Allan Bromley, 79, Canadian-American physicist, presidential advisor.
- Jean Cayrol, 93, French author.
- Pierre Chevalier, 89, French film director and screenwriter.
- Dave Goodman, 53, British music producer, heart attack.
- Ben Jones, 80, Grenadian politician, Prime Minister (1989-1990).
- Igor Ledogorov, 72, Soviet and Russian actor, cancer.
- Arthur Miller, 89, American playwright (Death of a Salesman, A View from the Bridge, The Crucible), congestive heart failure.
- Frederick W. Mote, 82, American sinologist.
- Fritz Scholder, 67, American native American artist.
- Jack Segal, 86, American pianist and composer.
- Ruth Williams, 78, American baseball player.

=== 11 ===
- Samuel W. Alderson, 90, American inventor of crash test dummies bone cancer.
- Jack L. Chalker, 60, American science fiction writer, kidney failure.
- Raymond Hermantier, 81, French actor.
- Mary Jackson, 83, American mathematician and aerospace engineer, first black female engineer at NASA.
- Vladimir Kotelnikov, 96, Information theory and radar astronomy pioneer from the Soviet Union.
- Dénes Kovács, 74, Hungarian classical violinist and academic teacher.
- Eva Magni, 98, Italian stage and film actress.
- Míla Myslíková, 71, 1933-2005 Czech actress and writer, stroke.
- Stan Richards, 74, British actor (Emmerdale), pulmonary emphysema.

=== 12 ===
- Archie Butterworth, 92, British racing driver and designer.
- Sir John Dacie, 92, British haematologist.
- Brian Kelly, 73, American actor, pneumonia.
- James McClure, 88, American international table tennis player.
- Monem Munna, 38, Bangladeshi footballer, kidney disease.
- Sammi Smith, 61, American country music singer, (Help Me Make It Through the Night), pulmonary emphysema.
- Dorothy Stang, 73, American nun, murdered in Anapu, Brazil.
- Marinus van der Goes van Naters, 104, Dutch politician.
- Rafael Vidal, 41, Venezuelan swimmer, Olympic medalist (1980, 1984), car crash.

=== 13 ===
- Saminini Arulappa, 80, Indian Roman Catholic archbishop.
- Harry Baird, 73, Guyanese-born British actor, cancer.
- Nelson Briles, 61, American baseball player, heart attack.
- Sixten Ehrling, 86, Swedish conductor.
- Mary Hallaren, 97, American soldier, first woman to join the United States Army.
- Sister Lúcia, 97, Portuguese nun, last survivor of the three shepherd children of the Fatima apparition in 1917.
- Dorothy Smith, 85, British Olympic gymnast (1948).
- Maurice Trintignant, 87, French racing driver, twice winner of the Monaco Grand Prix.
- Dick Weber, 75, American professional bowler, father of Pete Weber, respiratory failure.
- Peter White, 69, Australian politician.

=== 14 ===
- Ron Burgess, 87, Welsh footballer with Tottenham Hotspur and Wales.
- Sonya Dorman, 81, American science fiction writer and poet.
- Thabet El-Batal, 51, Egyptian Goalkeeper association football goalkeeper, cancer.
- Vic Emery, 84, Australian cricketer.
- Rafic Hariri, 60, Lebanese business tycoon and politician, twice Prime Minister of Lebanon, car bomb.
- Albert Harris, 89, English musician.
- Aubelin Jolicoeur, 81, Haitian journalist and columnist.
- Vidya Niwas Mishra, 79, Indian scholar, Hindi-Sanskrit littérateur, and journalist, traffic collision.
- Otto Plaschkes, 75, British film producer (Georgy Girl).
- Angel Scull, 76, Cuban baseball player.
- Pauli Toivonen, 75, Finnish rally car driver.
- Najai Turpin, 23, American boxer and reality show contestant (The Contender), suicide.
- Henry Wolf, 79, Austrian-American graphic designer, photographer and art director.

=== 15 ===
- Carlo Tullio Altan, 88, Italian anthropologist and sociologist.
- Pierre Bachelet, 60, French singer, lung cancer.
- Jean-François Dubessay, 83, French Olympic field hockey player (1948, 1952).
- Marc Eyraud, 80, French film actor.
- Samuel T. Francis, 57, American white supremacist writer, aortic aneurysm.
- Dudu Geva, 54, Israeli artist, writer, cartoonist, and illustrator, heart attack.
- Richard Grunberger, 80, British historian.
- David Leach, 93, English potter.
- Yury Morozov, 70, Soviet football player and coach.
- Bob Schafer, 71, American basketball player (Philadelphia Warriors, St. Louis Hawks, Syracuse Nationals).

=== 16 ===
- Michael Aikman, 71, Australian rower and Olympian (1956).
- Hans von Blixen-Finecke, 88, Swedish Army officer and Olympic equestrian (1952, 1956).
- Nicole DeHuff, 30, American actress (Meet the Parents, Suspect Zero, CSI: Miami), pneumonia.
- Bill Potts, 76, American jazz pianist and arranger, cardiac arrest.
- Jwani Riad Noseir, 92, Eygptian Olympic basketball player (1936).
- Narriman Sadek, (Nariman Sadeq), 71, Egyptian queen, ex-wife of King Farouk, cerebral hemorrhage.
- Marcello Viotti, 50, Italian conductor, stroke.
- Gerry Wolff, 84, German actor.

=== 17 ===
- F. M. Busby, 83, American science fiction writer.
- Jens Martin Knudsen, 74, Danish astrophysicist.
- César Marcelak, 92, French cycling champion.
- Miodrag Nikolić, 66, Serbian basketball player, coach, and Olympian (1960, 1964).
- Dan O'Herlihy, 85, Irish actor (RoboCop, Robinson Crusoe, Fail Safe).
- Omar Sívori, 69, Argentinian and Italian footballer, pancreatic cancer.

=== 18 ===
- Bonar Bain, 82, Canadian actor and twin brother of actor Conrad Bain.
- Uli Derickson, 60, German-American airline stewardess, protagonist in 1985 airplane hijacking, cancer.
- Marian Kamil Dziewanowski, 91, Polish-American historian.
- Marta Flores, 92, Spanish actress.
- Attilio Giovannini, 80, Italian football player.
- Greg Kehoe, 87, Australian politician.
- Gwendolyn Knight, 91, American artist.
- Robert R. Merhige Jr., 86, American district judge (United States District Court for the Eastern District of Virginia).
- Lim Por-yen, 90, Hong Kong industrialist.
- Harald Szeemann, 71, Swiss curator and art historian.

=== 19 ===
- Li Baohua, 95, Chinese politician.
- Huy Can, 85, Vietnamese poet.
- Hartvig Møller, 80, Danish footballer.
- Parsons Nabiula, 75, Filipino Olympic swimmer (1956).
- Kihachi Okamoto, 81, Japanese film director, esophageal cancer.
- Peter Pryor, 74, Australian Olympic cyclist (1952).
- Miao Tian, 79, Chinese film actor, lymphoma.

=== 20 ===
- Jacques Ploncard d'Assac, 94, French writer, journalist and political activist.
- Pam Bricker, 50, American jazz vocalist and music professor, suicide by hanging.
- Sandra Dee, 62, American actress (Gidget, Imitation of Life, Until They Sail), kidney failure and pneumonia.
- José Gómez, 88, Guatemalan Olympic sports shooter (1952).
- Josef Holeček, 84, Czech sprint canoeist and Olympic champion (1948, 1952).
- Dalene Matthee, 67, Afrikaans-South African author, heart failure.
- Raymond Mhlaba, 85, South African political leader and the first Premier of the Eastern Cape, liver cancer.
- John Raitt, 88, American classic Broadway star and father of Bonnie Raitt, pneumonia.
- Hunter S. Thompson, 67, American journalist, suicide by gunshot.
- J. Williams, 56, Indian film producer, director and cinematographer.
- Jimmy Young, 56, American boxer, heart failure.

=== 21 ===
- Zdzisław Beksiński, 75, Polish artist, homicide.
- Ara Berberian, 74, American bass with the New York City Metropolitan Opera.
- Gérard Bessette, 84, Canadian writer and academic.
- Wu Bo, 99, Chinese politician.
- Horst Drinda, 77, German actor.
- Justin Howes, 41, British historian of printing and lettering.
- Guillermo Cabrera Infante, 75, Cuban novelist, essayist, and screenwriter, sepsis.
- Royal Kahler, 86, American football player (Nebraska Cornhuskers, Pittsburgh Steelers, Green Bay Packers).
- Josef Metternich, 89, German operatic baritone.
- Nando Pajarola, 69, Swiss Olympic alpine skier (1960).
- Gene Scott, 75, American televangelist and author, stroke.
- Don Tolhurst, 75, Australian Olympic shooter (1956, 1960, 1964, 1968).
- Ernest Vandiver, 86, American politician, governor of the Georgia (1959–1963).

=== 22 ===
- Mikko Ala-Leppilampi, 61, Finnish Olympic middle-distance runner (1972).
- David Bradford, 66, American economist.
- Leo Brewer, 85, American physical chemist.
- Mladen Delić, 86, Croatian sports commentator.
- Lee Eun-ju (이은주), 24, South Korean actress, suicide by hanging.
- Luigi Giussani, 82, Italian Catholic priest, founder of the "Communion and Liberation" Catholic youth movement, Parkinson's disease.
- Ben Huffman, 90, American Major League Baseball player (St. Louis Browns).
- Renzo Imbeni, 60, Italian politician, mayor of Bologna (1983-1993).
- Kuntowijoyo, 61, Indonesian writer, meningoencephalitis.
- Heath Lamberts, 63, Canadian actor, cancer.
- Josette Rey-Debove, 75, French lexicographer and semiologist.
- Mario Ricci, 90, Italian cyclist.
- Reggie Roby, 43, American gridiron football player, heart attack.
- Harry Simeone, 94, American music arranger, conductor and composer (Little Drummer Boy).
- Simone Simon, 94, French actress.
- Ahmad Vafadar, 78, Iranian wrestler and Olympian (1952).

=== 23 ===
- All Along, 25, French racehorse.
- Josep María Cruxent, Venezuelan archaeologist.
- Wilson Fitts, 89, American basketball player.
- Tom Patterson, 84, Canadian founder of the Stratford Festival of Canada.
- Henk Zeevalking, 82, Dutch politician and co-founder of Democrats 66.

=== 24 ===
- John Barron, 75, American journalist.
- Jochen Bleicken, 78, German ancient historian.
- Thadée Cisowski, 78, Polish-French footballer.
- Álvaro Dias, 82, Portuguese Olympic high jumper (1948).
- Sumner Gerard, 88, American politician and diplomat.
- Goldie Hill, 72, American country music singer, cancer.
- Robin Jenkins, 92, Scottish novelist, author of "The Cone-Gatherers" and "Fergus Lamont".
- Coşkun Kırca, 77, Turkish diplomat, journalist and politician.
- András Kozák, 62, Hungarian film actor, brain tumor.
- Galina Kreft, 54, Soviet sprint canoer and Olympic champion (1976, 1980).
- Napoleón Medina, 85, Ecuadorian footballer.
- Leonard Miall, 90, British BBC broadcaster and administrator.
- Gustavo Vázquez Montes, 42, Mexican politician, incumbent governor of Colima, Mexico, aviation accident.
- Hugh Nibley, 94, American historian, focussing on the Church of Jesus Christ of Latter-day Saints.
- Glanmor Williams, 84, Welsh historian.
- Hans-Jürgen Wischnewski, 82, German politician and former cabinet minister.

=== 25 ===
- Abdulkareem Adisa, 56, Nigerian major general.
- Peter Benenson, 83, British lawyer and founder of Amnesty International, pneumonia.
- Nick Colosi, 79, American baseball umpire.
- Ian Colquhoun, 80, New Zealand cricket player.
- Francis E. Garchitorena, 67, Filipino lawyer and judge.
- Leo Labine, 73, Canadian ice hockey player (Boston Bruins, Detroit Red Wings), cancer.
- Don LeJohn, 70, American baseball player (Los Angeles Dodgers).
- Pappo, 54, Argentine blues and rock and roll guitarist and composer, traffic collision.
- Edward Patten, 65, American soul singer, member of Gladys Knight & the Pips, stroke.
- Jean Prat, 81, French rugby union football player.
- Atef Sedki, 74, Egyptian politician, Prime Minister (1986-1996).
- Noboru Sugimura, 56, Japanese television and video game writer.
- Jim Taylor, 70, American football player (Baylor Bears, Pittsburgh Steelers, Chicago Cardinals).

=== 26 ===
- Max Faulkner, 88, British golfer.
- Henry Grunwald, 82, Austrian-American journalist, editor and ambassador to Austria (1988–1990).
- Witness Mangwende, 59, Zimbabwean politician and diplomat, Minister of Foreign Affairs (1981–1987).
- Paolo Moffa, 89, Italian film director, producer and screenwriter.
- Jef Raskin, 61, American creator of the Apple Macintosh, pancreatic cancer.
- Pierre Trabaud, 82, French film actor.
- Johnny Williams, 77, American football player (USC Trojans, Washington Redskins, San Francisco 49ers).

=== 27 ===
- Haruna Abubakar, 52, Nigerian lawyer and politician.
- James Avati, 92, American illustrator.
- Franco Bracardi, 67, Italian actor, composer, pianist and stand-up comedian.
- Ed Clary, 88, American baseball and football player.
- Ted Hazelwood, 80, American football player (Chicago Hornets, Washington Redskins).
- Hiroyuki Nasu, 53, Japanese film director.
- Frank Vincent Ortiz, Jr., 78, American diplomat.
- Bruno Padulazzi, 77, Italian footballer.
- Pukazhenthi, 75, Indian music film director.
- Allan Rae, 82, Jamaican cricket player.
- Carl Taseff, 76, American NFL gridiron football player and assistant coach.

=== 28 ===
- Yevgeny Alekseyev, 85, Soviet/Russian basketball player and coach.
- Chris Curtis, 63, English drummer with The Searchers.
- Richard A. Fletcher, 60, British historian, heart attack.
- Giovanni Invernizzi, 73, Italian football player and coach.
- Mario Luzi, 90, Italian poet.
- Édouard Stern, 50, French banker, murdered.
- Vic Webber, 98, Australian rugby league footballer.
