= Jan Oblak =

Slovenian footballer (born 1993)

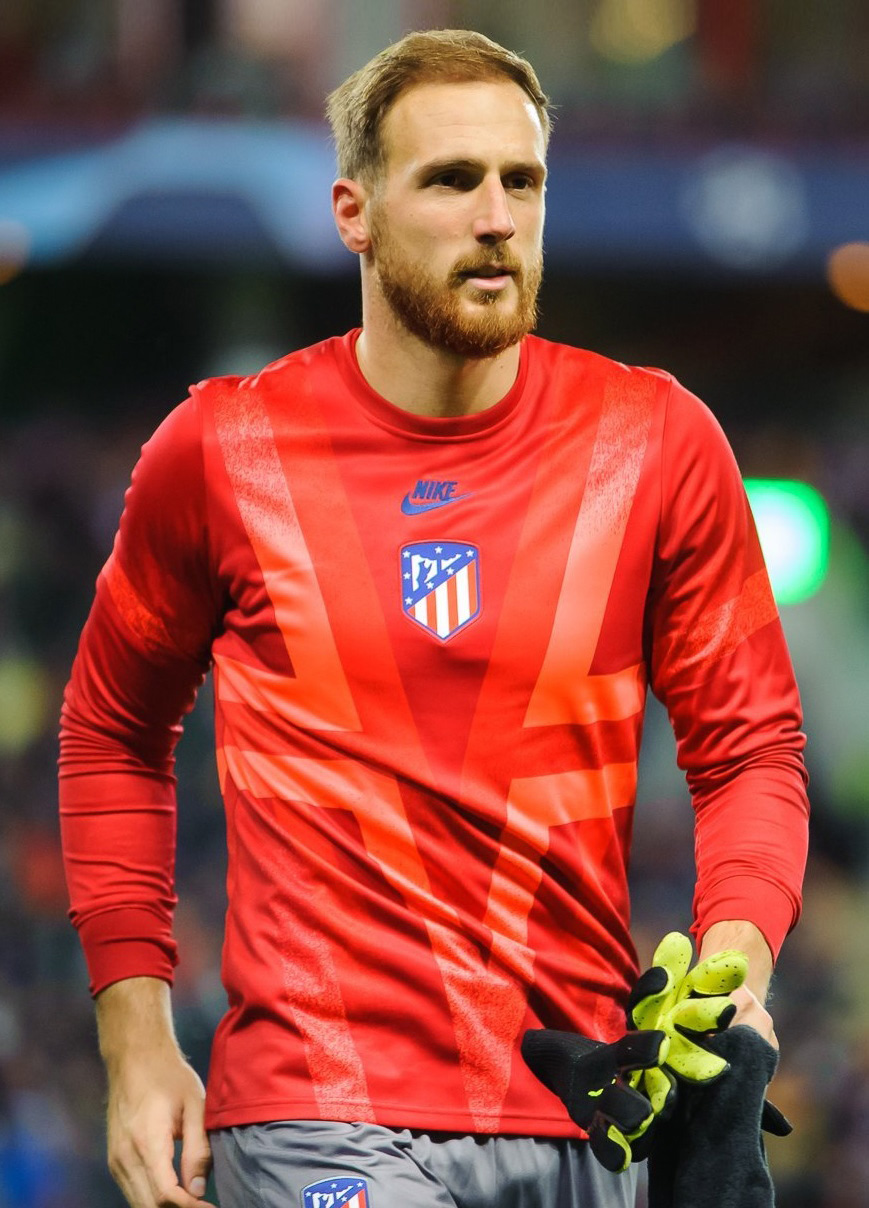
- Oblak warming up for Atlético Madrid in 2019

Personal information
- Full name: Jan Oblak
- Date of birth: 7 January 1993 (age 33)
- Place of birth: Škofja Loka, Slovenia
- Height: 1.88 m (6 ft 2 in)
- Position: Goalkeeper

Team information
- Current team: Atlético Madrid
- Number: 13

Youth career
- 1998–2003: Ločan
- 2003–2005: Olimpija
- 2005–2009: Olimpija Ljubljana

Senior career*
Years	Team	Apps	(Gls)
2009–2010	Olimpija Ljubljana	34	(0)
2010–2014	Benfica	16	(0)
2010	→ Beira-Mar (loan)	0	(0)
2011	→ Olhanense (loan)	0	(0)
2011–2012	→ União de Leiria (loan)	16	(0)
2012–2013	→ Rio Ave (loan)	28	(0)
2013	Benfica B	2	(0)
2014–	Atlético Madrid	412	(0)

International career^{‡}
2008	Slovenia U15	1	(0)
2009	Slovenia U16	2	(0)
2010–2012	Slovenia U20	4	(0)
2009–2013	Slovenia U21	18	(0)
2012–	Slovenia	90	(0)
- * Club domestic league appearances and goals as of 22 November 2026 ‡ National team caps and goals as of 16 November 2026

Jan Oblak (born 7 January 1993) is a Slovenian professional footballer who plays as a goalkeeper for La Liga club Atlético Madrid and captains the Slovenia national team.

Oblak signed for Portuguese club Benfica at the age of 17, and was part of the team that won the domestic treble in the 2013–14 season. In 2014 he moved to Atlético Madrid for a fee of €16 million, becoming La Liga's most expensive goalkeeper at the time. In the 2015–16 season, he won the Ricardo Zamora Trophy for best goalkeeper, conceding an all-time record low of 18 goals. He won the award again in the next three seasons, and two more in 2021 and 2025 for a record six trophies. Oblak was also nominated for the 2017 and 2018 Ballon d'Or awards, following his consistent performances with his club.

With over 550 appearances for Atlético Madrid, Oblak has won four trophies with the club, including the 2020–21 edition of La Liga.

Oblak made his senior international debut for Slovenia in 2012, and has been named Slovenian Footballer of the Year on nine occasions. He was also part of Slovenia's national youth teams, from the under-15 to under-21 sides. He represented the senior side at UEFA Euro 2024.

== Club career ==
=== Olimpija ===
"Robert Volk was a goalkeeper and a goalkeeper coach at the same time. He had young Jan Oblak and also Damir Botonjič, who wanted to return to football after his brother's death. One day Volk noticed Oblak's immense talent had outgrown everybody. He said "this kid is better than me" and gave up his spot in the team to a 16-year-old. We were a bit stunned, not to mention Oblak's father, who could not believe we took his son to training camp with the main squad. We quickly realized Volk is not mistaken."

— Former Olimpija Ljubljana coach Janez Pate about Jan Oblak's beginnings

Born in the Upper Carniolan town of Škofja Loka, Oblak started playing football at the age of five for his home town club Ločan. At the age of ten, he moved to the Olimpija youth academy, where he remained until the end of the 2004–05 season when the club was dissolved. He then moved to the newly founded Bežigrad, which, after a series of name changes, became Olimpija Ljubljana in 2008. The following year, Oblak rejected a contract from Italian club Empoli in favour of a trial at Fulham, but he eventually did not leave the club and committed his future with a contract extension until 2011. On 17 May 2009, Oblak, aged 16, made his professional debut for Olimpija Ljubljana in the 2008–09 Slovenian Second League in a 7–2 win against Mura 05. Olimpija Ljubljana earned promotion to PrvaLiga for the 2009–10 season as league winners. In the next season, Oblak was the team's main goalkeeper, only missing three league games as the club finished fourth in the league table.

=== Benfica ===
On 14 June 2010, Oblak signed a contract with Portuguese club Benfica, who loaned him to fellow top level club Beira-Mar in August 2010. He then joined Olhanense on loan in January 2011, until the end of the 2010–11 season.

Benfica loaned Oblak to another Portuguese team, União de Leiria, for the 2011–12 campaign. He made his league debut on 15 January 2012, in a 2–2 away draw against Nacional. On 29 April 2012, after most of the Leiria squad rescinded their contracts due to financial struggles within the club, Oblak was one of only eight players to take part in the league match at home against Feirense in an eventual 4–0 home defeat.

In July 2013, Oblak failed to present himself for pre-season training, claiming he had no contract with Benfica. Late into the following month, he signed a contract extension until 2018, describing the situation as a "misunderstanding."

After long-time starting goalkeeper Artur made a series of mistakes midway through the 2013–14 campaign, Benfica manager Jorge Jesus dropped him in favour of Oblak, and the latter went on to keep several clean sheets in his first starts, notably in a 2–0 home win against Porto and a 0–0 draw at Juventus in the semi-finals of the UEFA Europa League. He eventually won the league's Best Goalkeeper of the Year award on 6 July 2014.

=== Atlético Madrid ===
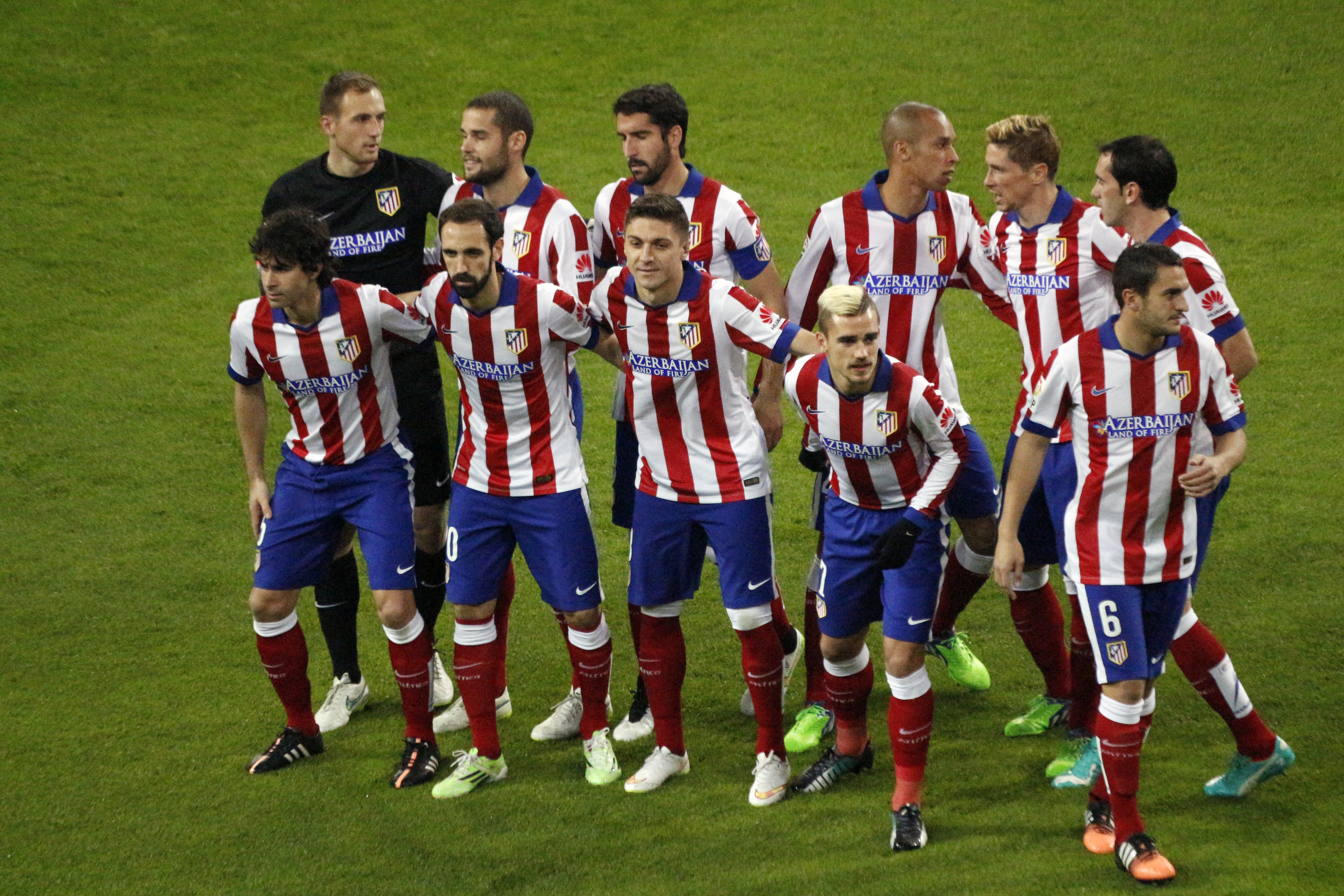
Oblak (in black) before a match with Atlético Madrid in 2015

On 16 July 2014, Atlético Madrid announced they had reached an agreement with Benfica for the transfer of Oblak, pending a medical examination. Atlético paid €16 million for the Slovenian player, making him the most expensive goalkeeper in La Liga history. Oblak moved to Madrid on a six-year deal as a replacement for Thibaut Courtois, who had returned to play for his parent club Chelsea following his loan expiration. During his presentation, on 22 July 2014, Oblak said, "I don't come to replace anyone. I come as another player. I'm here along with the rest of the players and goalkeepers. I'll do everything in my power to defend this shirt and achieve great results this season. I will do everything in my hand to help the team."

==== 2014–2016: First Zamora Trophy and Champions League final ====
Oblak was an unused substitute in his first competitive fixture on 19 August 2014, the first leg of the 2014 Supercopa de España against Real Madrid, with Miguel Ángel Moyà playing instead. He made his debut on 16 September 2014, in a 3–2 defeat away to Olympiacos in Atlético's first Champions League group match of the season. His first clean sheet came in his first Copa del Rey match, a 3–0 win away to L'Hospitalet in the first leg of the last 32 on 3 December 2014. On 17 March 2015, he replaced the injured Moyà in the 23rd minute of a Champions League last 16 second leg against Bayer Leverkusen, and kept a clean sheet in a 1–0 home victory. The tie went to a penalty shoot-out, in which he saved Leverkusen's first attempt by Hakan Çalhanoğlu in an eventual triumph. Four days later, due to the injury, he made his league debut, keeping a clean sheet in a 2–0 home win over neighbours Getafe.

In February 2016, Oblak was rewarded with a contract extension through 2021 with a reported release clause of £77.5 million. On 3 May 2016, Oblak saved Thomas Müller's penalty at the Allianz Arena in the second leg of the Champions League semi-finals; although Atlético lost the match 2–1, they advanced to the final on away goals. In the final, however, Atlético lost against Real Madrid 5–3 on penalties, with Oblak failing to save any of the five attempts. Despite this, he was included in the squad of the season of the 2015–16 Champions League. As the domestic season ended, he won the Ricardo Zamora Trophy for best goalkeeper, having conceded 18 goals in 38 games, equalling the 22-year-old record of Deportivo de La Coruña's Francisco Liaño.

==== 2016–2019: Europa League title and further Zamora awards ====
Oblak received attention on 15 March 2017, in a Champions League game against Bayer Leverkusen, where he made three saves in succession to ensure a goalless draw and passage to the quarter-finals. He told UEFA's website: "These are things that happen. Sometimes you save three efforts and other times they score all three." He was again included in the 2016–17 UEFA Champions League squad of the season and also won the second consecutive Ricardo Zamora Trophy. He was also shortlisted for the 2017 Ballon d'Or, where he finished 26th with 4 votes. On 28 January 2018, Oblak played his 100th league game for Atlético when he started the game against Las Palmas. In the 100 league games, he kept 59 clean sheets and conceded only 54 goals. In the 2018 UEFA Europa League Final, Oblak kept a clean sheet as his side won 3–0 against Olympique de Marseille, winning their third Europa League title in eight years. This was Oblak's first European title, having been a runner up twice before. As a result of his performances, he was included in the Europa League squad of the season. At the end of domestic season, he won the Ricardo Zamora Trophy for a third consecutive time, having conceded only 22 goals in 37 games. He was also awarded the La Liga Best Goalkeeper award for the third consecutive season, hence becoming the first goalkeeper to win the award three times. He was included into the 2018 Ballon d'Or shortlist again, this time receiving two votes as he finished 25th in the final list.

On 6 November 2018, Oblak kept a clean sheet in a 2–0 home win over Borussia Dortmund in the group stages of the UEFA Champions League. By doing so, he kept his 100th clean sheet for Atlético, a feat which he achieved in 178 official games. On 17 April 2019, Oblak agreed to a four-year contract extension with the club, keeping him at the club until 2023.

At the end of the season, Oblak won the Ricardo Zamora Trophy for the fourth consecutive season, hence equalling the record of Víctor Valdés for most consecutive Zamora Trophies won. He was also awarded the La Liga Best Goalkeeper of the season award for the fourth consecutive time.

==== 2019–2021: Clean sheets record and first La Liga title ====
Ahead of the 2019–20 season, he was named as vice-captain of the team, behind Koke. On 21 October 2019, Oblak was nominated for the inaugural edition of Yashin Trophy, the Ballon D'Or of goalkeepers. He finished in fourth place. On 6 December 2019, Oblak kept a clean sheet in a 0–0 away draw against Villarreal. By doing so, he broke the club record of Abel Resino for most clean sheets with his 96th clean sheet in his 169th league game.

On 11 March 2020, following Atlético Madrid's 3–2 away victory over defending champions Liverpool in the last 16 of the UEFA Champions League, Oblak, playing his fiftieth Champions League game, was awarded the Man of the Match award by UEFA, after making nine saves to help his team progress to the quarter-finals with a 4–2 aggregate victory. On 17 June 2020, Oblak kept a clean sheet in a 5–0 away win against Osasuna, his 182nd league game, and by doing so, became the fastest goalkeeper to achieve 100 clean sheets landmark in La Liga history, breaking an almost 50-year-old record of Miguel Reina who did the same in 222 league appearances. Oblak also became the first non-Spanish goalkeeper to keep 100 clean sheets in La Liga history. On 27 June 2020, Oblak played his 250th game for Atlético as his side beat Deportivo Alavés 2–1. He has reached the milestone just one week after equalling José Francisco Molina as the second goalkeeper with the most appearances in the club's history.

In 2020–21, Oblak won the La Liga title with Atlético Madrid. He managed to keep 18 clean sheets in 38 matches, in addition to achieving 80% save rate for the season. He also won the Zamora Trophy for the fifth time, equaling the record of both Antoni Ramallets and Victor Valdés. Furthermore, he was awarded La Liga Player of the Season for the first time in his career.

==== 2021–present: Appearance records and contract extension ====
On 15 August 2021, Oblak played his 304th competitive match for Atlético Madrid and became the goalkeeper with the most appearances for the club, breaking the previous record of Abel Resino. In July 2022, it was reported that Oblak had extended his contract with Atlético Madrid until 2028.

On 9 May 2023, Oblak made his 390th appearance for Atlético in a 2–1 away win over Rayo Vallecano, becoming the club's most-capped foreign player, breaking Diego Godín's previous record. On 24 September, he played his 300th La Liga match in a 3–1 victory over Real Madrid, becoming the seventh Atlético Madrid player to achieve this feat. He also became the fifth foreign goalkeeper to reach that milestone, following Carlos Fenoy, Dudu Aouate, Leo Franco and Carlos Kameni.

On 13 March 2024, Oblak saved two penalties in a penalty shoot-out win against Inter Milan in the Champions League round of 16, becoming the first goalkeeper in Champions League history to win three penalty shoot-outs with one club. In a league game against Real Sociedad on 6 October, Oblak made a double save to deny Martín Zubimendi and Nayef Aguerd, which would later earn him the La Liga Save of the Month award for October.

On 21 January 2026, he made his 100th Champions League appearance in a 1–1 away draw with Galatasaray.

== International career ==
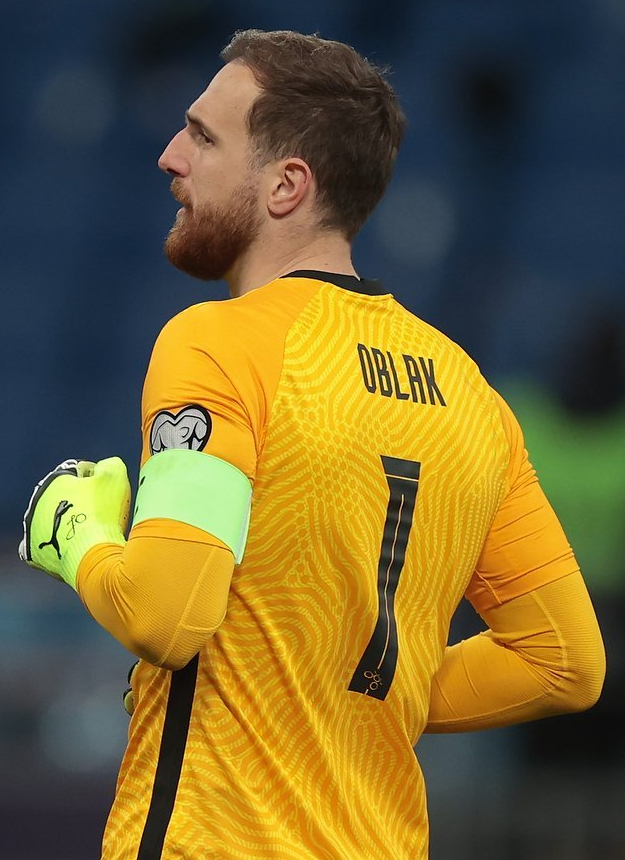
Oblak captaining Slovenia in 2021

Oblak was first called by the Slovenia under-21 team in August 2009, replacing the injured Jan Koprivec. He made his debut against France on 9 September of that year, in the 2011 UEFA European Under-21 Championship qualifiers.

On 11 September 2012, Oblak made his first appearance for the senior side, starting in a 2–1 away loss against Norway in the 2014 FIFA World Cup qualifiers.

He became the first-choice goalkeeper of the national team after the international retirement of Samir Handanović at the end of 2015; however, he took a break from his international duties during the 2018–19 UEFA Nations League, due to an arm injury he had been battling at the time.

On 6 September 2019, Oblak captained Slovenia for the first time.

== Style of play ==
Oblak is a tall, athletic, and physically fit keeper. He is mainly known for his speed, quick reflexes, and agility, as well as his reading of the game, and in particular, his excellent handling and ability to come off his line and collect crosses, which enables him to excel in the air and command his area effectively.

== Personal life ==
Oblak was born to a Slovenian father, Matjaž Oblak, and a mother, Stojanka Majkić, from Republika Srpska. His older sister, Teja Oblak (born 1990), is a professional basketball player and a member of the Slovenia national team.

Since 2023, Oblak is in a relationship with Serbian tennis player Olga Danilović.

== Career statistics ==
=== Club ===
As of match played 22 November 2026

Appearances and goals by club, season and competition
Club	Season	League			National cup (Note: Includes Taça de Portugal, Copa del Rey)		League cup (Note: Includes Taça da Liga)		Continental		Other		Total	
Club	Season	Division	Apps	Goals	Apps	Goals	Apps	Goals	Apps	Goals	Apps	Goals	Apps	Goals
Olimpija Ljubljana	2008–09	2. SNL	1	0	0	0	—		—		—		1	0
Olimpija Ljubljana	2009–10	1. SNL	33	0	0	0	—		—		—		33	0
Olimpija Ljubljana	Total		34	0	0	0	—		—		—		34	0
Benfica	2010–11	Primeira Liga	0	0	0	0	0	0	0	0	0	0	0	0
Benfica	2011–12	Primeira Liga	0	0	0	0	0	0	0	0	—		0	0
Benfica	2012–13	Primeira Liga	0	0	0	0	0	0	0	0	—		0	0
Benfica	2013–14	Primeira Liga	16	0	3	0	3	0	4 (Note: Appearances in UEFA Europa League)	0	—		26	0
Benfica	Total		16	0	3	0	3	0	4	0	0	0	26	0
Beira-Mar (loan)	2010–11	Primeira Liga	0	0	2	0	0	0	—		—		2	0
Olhanense (loan)	2010–11	Primeira Liga	0	0	0	0	0	0	—		—		0	0
União de Leiria (loan)	2011–12	Primeira Liga	16	0	1	0	0	0	—		—		17	0
Rio Ave (loan)	2012–13	Primeira Liga	28	0	0	0	3	0	—		—		31	0
Benfica B	2013–14	Segunda Liga	2	0	—		—		—		—		2	0
Atlético Madrid	2014–15	La Liga	11	0	6	0	—		4 (Note: Appearances in UEFA Champions League)	0	0	0	21	0
Atlético Madrid	2015–16	La Liga	38	0	0	0	—		13	0	—		51	0
Atlético Madrid	2016–17	La Liga	30	0	0	0	—		11	0	—		41	0
Atlético Madrid	2017–18	La Liga	37	0	0	0	—		12 (Note: Six appearances in UEFA Champions League, six appearances in UEFA Europa League)	0	—		49	0
Atlético Madrid	2018–19	La Liga	37	0	0	0	—		8	0	1 (Note: Appearance in UEFA Super Cup)	0	46	0
Atlético Madrid	2019–20	La Liga	38	0	0	0	—		9	0	2 (Note: Appearances in Supercopa de España)	0	49	0
Atlético Madrid	2020–21	La Liga	38	0	0	0	—		8	0	—		46	0
Atlético Madrid	2021–22	La Liga	38	0	2	0	—		10	0	1	0	51	0
Atlético Madrid	2022–23	La Liga	28	0	5	0	—		5	0	—		38	0
Atlético Madrid	2023–24	La Liga	38	0	5	0	—		10	0	1	0	54	0
Atlético Madrid	2024–25	La Liga	36	0	0	0	—		10	0	3 (Note: Appearances in FIFA Club World Cup)	0	49	0
Atlético Madrid	2025–26	La Liga	30	0	0	0	—		12	0	1	0	43	0
Atlético Madrid	2026–27	La Liga	13	0	0	0	—		4	0	0	0	17	0
Atlético Madrid	Total		412	0	18	0	—		116	0	9	0	555	0
Career total			508	0	24	0	6	0	120	0	9	0	667	0

=== International ===
As of match played 16 November 2026

Appearances and goals by national team and year
National team	Year	Apps	Goals
Slovenia	2012	1	0
Slovenia	2013	2	0
Slovenia	2014	1	0
Slovenia	2015	2	0
Slovenia	2016	6	0
Slovenia	2017	6	0
Slovenia	2018	0	0
Slovenia	2019	10	0
Slovenia	2020	5	0
Slovenia	2021	11	0
Slovenia	2022	10	0
Slovenia	2023	8	0
Slovenia	2024	12	0
Slovenia	2025	8	0
Slovenia	2026	8	0
Total		90	0

== Honours ==
Olimpija Ljubljana

- Slovenian Second League: 2008–09

Benfica

- Primeira Liga: 2013–14
- Taça de Portugal: 2013–14
- Taça da Liga: 2013–14

Atlético Madrid

- La Liga: 2020–21
- Copa del Rey runner-up: 2025–26
- Supercopa de España: 2014; runner-up: 2019–20
- UEFA Europa League: 2017–18
- UEFA Super Cup: 2018
- UEFA Champions League runner-up: 2015–16

Individual

- Primeira Liga Best Goalkeeper: 2013–14
- La Liga Zamora Trophy: 2015–16, 2016–17, 2017–18, 2018–19, 2020–21, 2024–25
- La Liga Team of the Season: 2015–16
- UEFA Champions League Squad of the Season: 2015–16, 2016–17, 2019–20
- La Liga Best Goalkeeper: 2015–16
- UEFA La Liga Team of the Season: 2015–16, 2016–17, 2017–18, 2018–19
- UEFA Europa League Squad of the Season: 2017–18
- Slovenian Footballer of the Year: 2015, 2016, 2017, 2018, 2020, 2021, 2023, 2024, 2025
- Slovenian Youth Footballer of the Year: 2012, 2013
- La Liga Player of the Month: May 2021
- La Liga Save of the Season: 2024–25
- La Liga Save of the Month: October 2024, October 2025, December 2025
- La Liga Player of the Season: 2020–21
- ESM Team of the Year: 2020–21
