= Spasoje Bulajič =

Slovenian footballer (born 1975)

Personal information
- Full name: Spasoje Bulajič
- Date of birth: 24 November 1975 (age 50)
- Place of birth: Slovenj Gradec, SFR Yugoslavia
- Height: 1.86 m (6 ft 1 in)
- Position: Defender

Youth career
- Šoštanj

Senior career*
Years	Team	Apps	(Gls)
1992–1994	Rudar Velenje	43	(1)
1994	Olimpija Ljubljana	1	(0)
1995–1996	Publikum Celje	43	(2)
1996–1998	Maribor	64	(3)
1998–2002	1. FC Köln	47	(3)
2002–2004	Mainz 05	23	(1)
2004	Mainz 05 II	13	(0)
2004–2005	Mura Murska Sobota	27	(0)
2005–2007	AEL Limassol	48	(3)
2007–2008	AEP Paphos	26	(3)
2008–2009	Celje	7	(1)
Total		342	(17)

International career
1998–2004	Slovenia	26	(1)
- * Club domestic league appearances and goals

Spasoje Bulajič (born 24 November 1975) is a Slovenian former footballer who represented his country at Euro 2000 and the 2002 World Cup.

== Club career ==
Born in Slovenj Gradec, Bulajič started his football career at his home club Rudar Velenje. In the 1994–95 season he had short spell at Olimpija Ljubljana. After two seasons in Celje, he moved to Maribor. He was named 1997 Slovenian Youth Footballer of the Year and 1998 Slovenian Footballer of the Year, as Maribor won two consecutive Slovenian Championships and one Slovenian Cup. Later he played for German Köln and Mainz 05, Slovenian Mura Murska Sobota and Cypriot AEL Limassol and AEP Paphos FC. In the 2008–09 season, he again played for Celje.

== International career ==
Bulajič made his debut for Slovenia in a March 1998 friendly match away against Poland, coming on as a 46th-minute substitute for Andrej Poljšak, and earned a total of 26 caps, scoring 1 goal. He was a participant at the Euro 2000 and World Cup 2002. His final international was an April 2004 friendly away against Switzerland.

=== International goals ===
Scores and results list Slovenia's goal tally first.

#	Date	Venue	Opponent	Score	Result	Competition
1	22 April 1998	Fazanerija, Murska Sobota	Czech Republic	1–0	1–3	Friendly match

== Honours ==
Maribor

- Slovenian PrvaLiga: 1996–97, 1997–98
- Slovenian Cup: 1996–97

AEP Paphos

- Cypriot Second Division: 2007–08

== See also ==
- Slovenian international players
- List of NK Maribor players
