= Freis =

Freis is a surname. Notable people with the surname include:

- Edward D. Freis (1912–2005), American physician and researcher
- Sebastian Freis (born 1985), German footballer
- James Freis (born 1970), American lawyer and financial industry executive
