= Kamal Riad Noseir =

Egyptian basketball player

Personal information
- Nationality: Egyptian
- Born: 8 January 1912

Sport
- Sport: Basketball

Kamal Riad Noseir (Arabic: كمال رياض نصير; 8 January 1912 – before 18 March 1996) was an Egyptian basketball player. He competed in the men's tournament at the 1936 Summer Olympics. His brother Jwani Riad Noseir was also a basketball player.
