= Damir Botonjič =

Slovenian footballer

Personal information
- Full name: Damir Botonjič
- Date of birth: 14 September 1981 (age 45)
- Place of birth: SFR Yugoslavia
- Height: 1.92 m (6 ft 3 1/2 in)
- Position: Goalkeeper

Youth career
- Svoboda

Senior career*
Years	Team	Apps	(Gls)
1998–1999	HIT Gorica	0	(0)
1999–2004	Gençlerbirliği	23	(0)
2001–2002	→ NK Ljubljana (loan)	29	(0)
2004–2005	NK Ljubljana	14	(0)
2005–2006	Svoboda	3	(0)
2009	Livar	11	(0)
2009–2011	Olimpija Ljubljana	32	(0)

International career
2001	Slovenia U20	3	(0)
2002–2003	Slovenia U21	9	(0)
2004	Slovenia	1	(0)
- * Club domestic league appearances and goals

Damir Botonjič (born 14 September 1981) is a retired Slovenian football goalkeeper.

== Club career ==
Botonjič started his career at local side Svoboda. After one year in Gorica, he signed with Turkish side Gençlerbirliği. The first two seasons he played in the PAF league, appearing in 52 matches. He made his Süper Lig debut in October 2002 against Denizlispor. Next season was his most successful in Turkey. He played in 19 Süper Lig and 5 Turkish Cup matches and had an important role in a successful Uefa Cup run. In February 2005, he signed with Ljubljana. He made 14 appearances in Prva Liga, before leaving for another Ljubljana side, Svoboda. He returned in the second part of the 2008-09 season, making 11 appearances for Livar. On 14 July 2009, he signed a contract with Olimpija Ljubljana.

== International career ==
Botonjič was a member of the Slovenia U21 team. He made his only appearance for Slovenia in a friendly match against Latvia on 31 March 2004, coming on as a 73rd-minute substitute for Marko Simeunovič.

== Personal life ==
His elder brother Nedžad, also a goalkeeper, died during a training session in February 2005.
