= Robert Volk =

Slovenian footballer (born 1965)

Personal information
- Date of birth: 30 August 1965 (age 61)
- Place of birth: Koper, SFR Yugoslavia
- Height: 1.84 m (6 ft 0 in)
- Position: Goalkeeper

Youth career
- –1991: Koper

Senior career*
Years	Team	Apps	(Gls)
1991–1994	Koper	48	(0)
1994–1997	Gorica	25	(0)
1994–1995	→ Mura (loan)	29	(0)
1996	→ Rudar Velenje (loan)	0	(0)
1997–1998	Primorje	24	(0)
1998–2000	Sint-Truiden	18	(0)
2000–2003	Koper	12	(0)
2005–2009	Olimpija Ljubljana	42+	(0)
Total		198+	(0)
- * Club domestic league appearances and goals

Robert Volk (born 30 August 1965) is a retired Slovenian footballer who played as a goalkeeper. He is the goalkeeping coach at Koper.

== Playing career ==
Volk had a spell abroad at Belgian side Sint-Truiden and was called up one time by the Slovenia national team, but was an unused substitute in a 1998 FIFA World Cup qualification match against Bosnia and Herzegovina.

At the end of his playing career, Volk was both playing and serving as the goalkeeping coach for Olimpija Ljubljana in the Slovenian lower tiers. In the spring of 2009, he decided to retire as a player in order to free up a first-team spot for Jan Oblak, who at the time was a 16-year-old academy goalkeeper. Volk made 156 top-flight appearances during his career, with 138 of those coming in the Slovenian PrvaLiga.
