= Samir Handanović =

Slovenian footballer (born 1984)

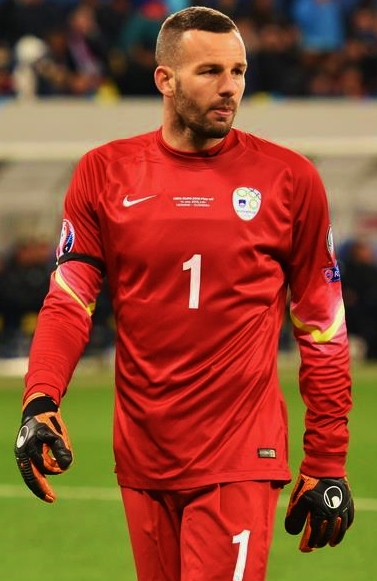
- Handanović with Slovenia in 2015

Personal information
- Date of birth: 14 July 1984 (age 42)
- Place of birth: Ljubljana, SR Slovenia, Yugoslavia
- Height: 1.93 m (6 ft 4 in)
- Position: Goalkeeper

Youth career
- –2003: Slovan

Senior career*
Years	Team	Apps	(Gls)
2003–2004	Domžale	7	(0)
2003	→ Zagorje (loan)	11	(0)
2004–2012	Udinese	182	(0)
2005–2006	→ Treviso (loan)	3	(0)
2006	→ Lazio (loan)	1	(0)
2006–2007	→ Rimini (loan)	39	(0)
2012–2023	Inter Milan	380	(0)
Total		623	(0)

International career
2001	Slovenia U17	3	(0)
2003–2004	Slovenia U20	4	(0)
2003–2006	Slovenia U21	9	(0)
2004–2015	Slovenia	81	(0)
- * Club domestic league appearances and goals

Samir Handanović (born 14 July 1984) is a Slovenian former professional footballer who played as a goalkeeper.

Before moving to Italy, Handanović played in his home country of Slovenia. In 2004, he was acquired by Udinese but spent the next few years on loan, playing for teams such as Treviso, Lazio and Rimini. Handanović returned to Udinese ahead of the 2007–08 season, where he played as a starter for the next five years. In the next season, he also played European football for the first time, making his debut in UEFA Cup. After five years as a starter and more than 200 appearances, Handanović joined Inter Milan in July 2012. In February 2019, he was named club captain, while in September, he made his 300th appearance for the club and subsequently went on to reach the 2020 UEFA Europa League final that season. He made his 500th Serie A appearance in February 2021, and won his first trophy that May by winning the title.

Having previously represented the Slovenia under-21 team, Handanović made his senior international debut for Slovenia in 2004. He went on to earn 81 caps for his country and played for them at the 2010 FIFA World Cup.

Nicknamed Batman, due to his acrobatic saves, he is regarded as one of the best goalkeepers of his generation, and is one of only four non-Italian keepers to be named Serie A Goalkeeper of the Year, winning the honour three times. A penalty saving specialist, during the 2010–11 Serie A season he saved a total of six penalty kicks, equalling an all-time league record set in the 1948–49 season. During the 2019–20 season, he equalled Gianluca Pagliuca's record of most penalties saved in Serie A with his 24th stop. He broke the record the following season on 17 October 2020.

== Club career ==
=== Early career ===
Handanović started his career at local side Slovan. He later joined Domžale, where he made his Slovenian PrvaLiga debut in the 2003–04 season. During the same season, he was also loaned to the Slovenian Second League side Zagorje.

=== Udinese ===
==== 2004–2006: First years as backup and loans ====
In the summer of 2004, at the age of 20, he was signed by Serie A side Udinese. However, his first spell with the Friuliani was short-lived as he was unable to cement his place in the starting line-up. His debut occurred on 20 November 2004 in a Coppa Italia match against Lecce, where he was sent-off in 91st minute for conceding a penalty after a foul on Mirko Vučinić; since Udinese had used all three substitutions, striker David Di Michele entered in goal in his place. Vučinić, however, failed to score from the penalty spot and Udinese won 5–4. He made his Serie A debut on 15 May 2005 in a 1–1 home draw against Sampdoria.

Handanović was on loan to Treviso in the summer of 2005, but in January 2006, he was exchanged with Matteo Sereni to Lazio. With Treviso, he received his first ever red card during the match against his next club, Lazio, on 18 September 2005 in an eventual 3–1 away loss. During his time with the Biancoceleste, Handanović played three matches and conceded six goals.

On 14 May 2006, in the last day of 2005–06 season, Handanović, with the number 24, played his first and last match for Lazio, keeping a clean sheet against Parma in a 1–0 home win.

==== 2006–2007: Loan to Rimini ====
In July 2006, Handanović was loaned to Rimini, with a pre-set price of €1.2 million. Thanks also to his saves, Rimini remained undefeated in both championship games played against Juventus. The club finished fifth in Serie B and conceded the fourth-fewest goals in the league. Handanović was considered the second best goalkeeper of that Serie B season, after Gianluigi Buffon. In June 2007, despite Rimini excising the option, Udinese also excised the option by paying Rimini €250,000 in net.

==== 2007–2010: Return to Udinese and established first choice ====
Handanović returned to Udinese in the summer of 2007 after Udinese excised the counter-option to reject the buying, where he replaced Morgan De Sanctis and signed a new and improved contract lasting until 30 June 2012.

Despite the arrival of the Venezuelan goalie Rafael Romo, Handanović retained his spot as the number one goalkeeper. He started his fourth season as a Udinese player by featuring full-90 minutes in team's opening league match of the season, a 2–2 home draw against Parma. He kept his goal intact for the first time this season on 19 September in matchday four against Napoli, which ended in a goalless draw.

During the 2009–10 campaign, Handanović was the most used player on the field, collecting a total of 40 appearances, including 37 in the league. In Serie A, he made a total of 130 saves as Udinese ended the season in 15th place.

==== 2010–2012: Most saved penalties in one season and departure ====
Before the start of the season, Handanović changed the squad number from 22 to 1. The squad started the 2010–11 season with four losses in its first four Serie A weeks, leaving Udinese in last place. Handanović kept his first clean sheet of the season on 26 September 2010 during a goalless draw against Sampdoria, helping the team to collect its first point of the season.

During a match against Lazio in May 2011, he saved a penalty from Mauro Zárate, his sixth saved penalty during the 2010–11 season that equalled the all-time league record set in the 1948–49 season for most penalties saved during the course of a single season. Due to his performances, he was named to the Serie A Team of the Year for 2010–11.

On 16 August 2011, he played his first ever UEFA Champions League match against Arsenal, in the first leg of the play-off round, being beaten by a Theo Walcott 4th-minute goal in a 1–0 away loss at Emirates Stadium. In the returning leg at Stadio Friuli after one week, Udinese was leading after 50 minutes, but Arsenal come back to beat Handanović twice in a span of 14 minutes with Bianconeri Friuliani being eliminated with the aggregate 3–1.

Handanović kept a clean sheet in team's opening league match against Lecce, helping the team to a 2–0 away win. Udinese and Handanović were unbeaten in their first seven Serie A games, and only conceded one goal in that period, which was the best defensive record in top European leagues at the time.

=== Inter Milan ===
==== Transfer ====
On 4 July 2012, Gino Pozzo, son of Udinese owner Giampaolo Pozzo, confirmed that an agreement had been reached for Handanović to join Inter Milan, with Inter paying a reported €11 million plus Davide Faraoni for his services; the transfer was made official by Inter five days later. Handanović was brought in to replace the Brazilian goalkeeper Júlio César to take over as first-choice goalkeeper. He signed a contract worth a reported €2 million per season, plus bonuses.

==== 2012–2015: Debut and team struggles ====
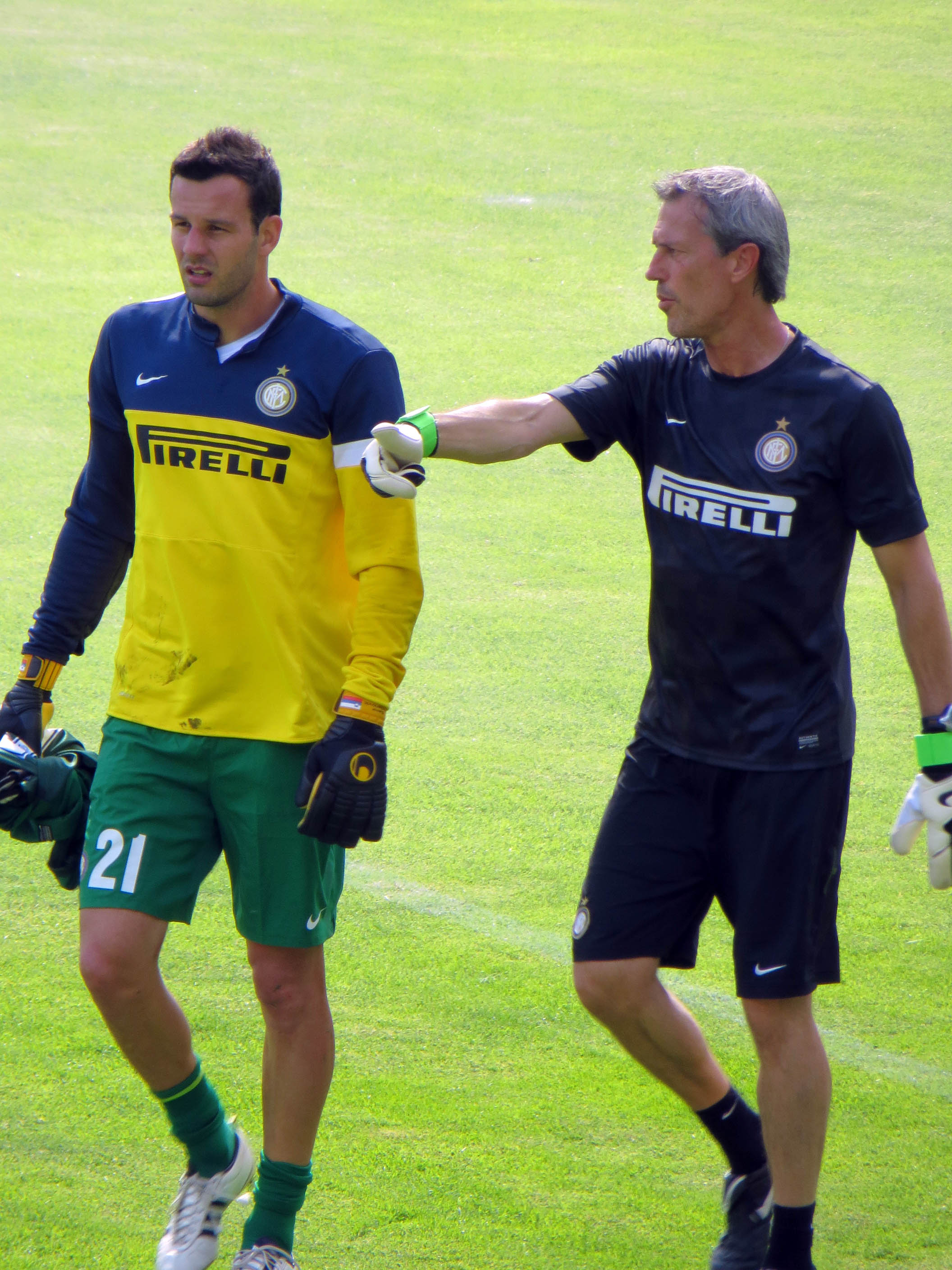
Handanović (left) in training with goalkeepers coach Alessandro Nista

He made his club debut on 2 August 2012, in a 3–0 win over Hajduk Split in the 2012–13 UEFA Europa League third qualifying round, then conceded two goals in the 2–0 return-leg loss at home on 2 August, but Inter advanced on a 3–2 aggregate. On 17 August, Handanović suffered a meniscus injury that delayed the start of his Serie A campaign until 16 September, in a 2–0 road win over Torino. Handanović kept crosstown rivals AC Milan at bay in his first Derby della Madonnina appearance on 7 October, won 1–0 by Inter. He made his 200th Serie A appearance in Inter's 2–1 home win over Napoli. Inter were held to a 1–1 draw in the second derby encounter on 25 February 2013, but Handanović was noted for performing several saves against Milan striker Mario Balotelli.

In 2012, Handanović was included for the first time in the top ten IFFHS Goalkeepers of the World, ranking eighth. After the end of 2012–13 season, thanks to his solid performances, Handanović was selected in Serie A Team of the Year for the second time in his career, being the goalkeeper with most appearances. He played 48 matches throughout the season, including 35 in Serie A and ten in the Europa League. Inter's season ended in disappointment, however, after failing to finish high in the Serie A table and the Europa League, earning a ninth-placed league finish (the worst position since the 1993–94 season), and a quarter-final exit in Europe.

On 19 June 2013, Inter acquired Handanović outright and sold Faraoni to Udinese for undisclosed fees.

In June, it was reported that Spanish side Barcelona offered to sign Handanović for €23 million, which was rejected by Inter owner Massimo Moratti; Handanović's agent also confirmed that his client will not move to Barcelona after the Catalan club opted instead to retain their incumbent starting goalkeeper Víctor Valdés for another year.

"Handanović is just unreal. He's carrying the team with his great saves. It almost seems like the norm, but I think it's certainly not normal. He should be given more acclaim, this goalkeeper, he really excels and doesn't get downhearted. He makes great saves. It's difficult for him, because the defence suffers at times, but he's always ready."

— Former Inter Milan goalkeeper Francesco Toldo.

On 18 August 2013, in Mazzarri's first match in charge, Handanović was in goal and kept his first clean sheet of the season in the Coppa Italia's third round match against Cittadella, where Inter progressed to the next round thanks to a 4–0 home win.

Handanović started the league season in strong fashion, keeping three clean sheets in the first four league matches. On 20 October, during the league encounter against Torino, he received his second-ever career red card for a foul on Alessio Cerci in the 5th minute; Inter however endured and drew 3–3. On 15 December, Handanović saved his first penalty as a Nerazzurri keeper in a 4–2 away loss against Napoli, saving a Goran Pandev penalty in the second half.

During the 2013–14 season, Inter returned to European competition after a year-long absence, finishing fifth in the league with 60 points. He played as a starter in Javier Zanetti's last competitive match at San Siro, in which Inter defeated Lazio 4–1 to secure a place in Europa League play-offs for the next season. Handanović managed 14 clean sheets in 36 appearances during the Serie A season, and conceded 32 goals.

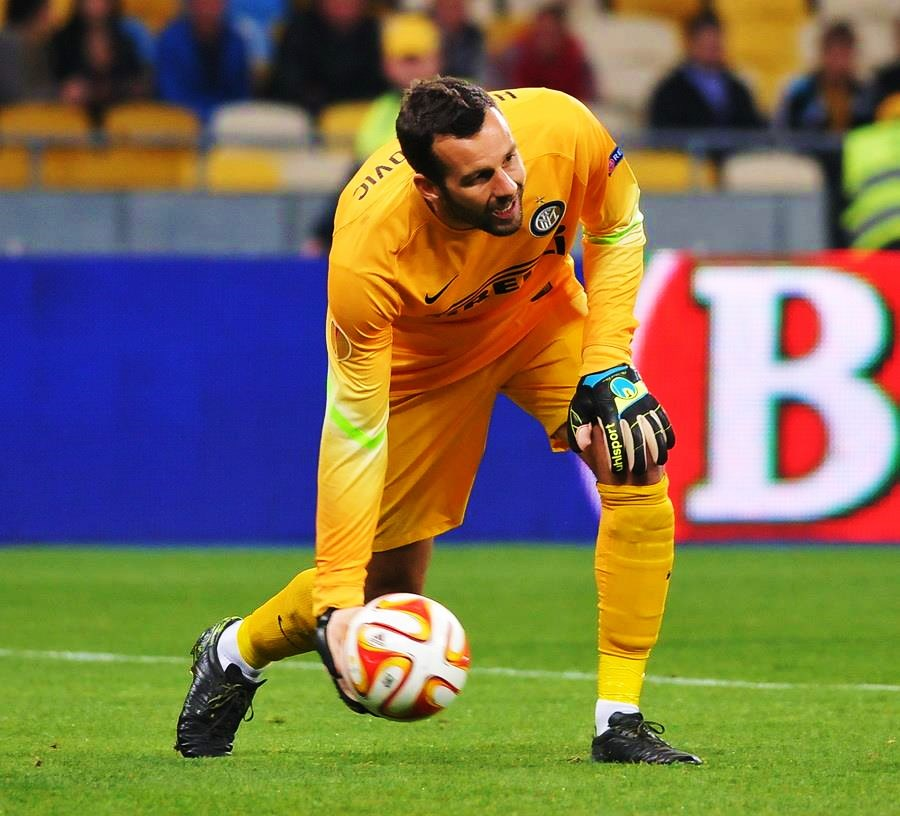
Handanović playing with Inter in Europa League

Inter opened the 2014–15 Serie A season with a disappointing goalless draw against Torino, with Handanović stopping a penalty kick from Marcelo Larrondo. After saving his last five Serie A penalties faced, Handanović saved from Yevhen Konoplyanka of Dnipro Dnipropetrovsk on 27 November 2014 in a game which Inter won to confirm top spot in their Europa League group with one game remaining. That was also his 100th appearance with Nerazzurri in all competitions.

Handanović played his 100th league match with Inter on 19 April 2015 in the Derby della Madonnina against Milan, keeping his goal intact as the match ended goalless. He ended his third season with Inter by playing 40 matches in all competitions, including 37 in Serie A, as Inter finished in eighth place, again failing to qualify for European competition. Handanović obtained 11 clean sheets in Serie A, the third-highest total in Serie A. Handanović also managed to have a shot-to-save ratio of better than 67 percent.

At the end of the season, it was reported that Handanović was the target of Premier League side Manchester United, but his agent turned down this opportunity by saying that his client will not move to the club.

==== 2015–2017: Champions League pursuits ====
Inter Milan commenced the 2015–16 season with a 1–0 home win against Atalanta, where Handanović kept his first clean sheet of the season. On 27 September 2015, in his 300th Serie A match, against Fiorentina, Handanović made perhaps his worst appearance by giving away a 3rd-minute penalty scored by Josip Iličić, later being beaten three times by Nikola Kalinić in an eventual 1–4 loss. The loss ended Inter's undefeated streak of the 2015–16 season. After the match, Handanović told the reporters that it was his fault for the way the match ended.

On 27 October, during the match against Bologna, Handanović made a crucial save by stopping a Mattia Destro shot in 94th minute to help Inter win 1–0 away at the Stadio Renato Dall'Ara. That was his sixth clean sheet in ten matches, and first win since one loss and three consecutive draws. He later dubbed it as his favourite save of the season. Four days later, in a match against Roma, Handanović was again decisive for his team, making nine saves, including a quadruple save in the 62nd minute, helping Inter to win the match 1–0 and to take the lead of the league with 24 points. He was selected Man of the Match for his performance.

Handanović ended 2015 with 26 decisive saves, 11 clean sheets, and only 11 goals conceded like no other goalkeeper in Serie A. Inter also ended 2015 at the top of the league.

Handanović agreed a contract extension until 2019, which was confirmed on 5 January 2016. Handanović began the new year with a clean-sheet in the team's 1–0 away win over Empoli, making several good saves throughout the match. On 16 January 2016, during an away match against Atalanta, Handanović was awarded the Man of the Match for an "outstanding" performance, as he made some fine saves. His save in the 61st minute, where he managed to stop Luca Cigarini's effort from point-blank range with his trailing foot, was deemed "save of the season" by European media.

Inter ended the 2015–16 season in fourth position, returning to UEFA Europa League after a one-year absence. Handanović managed 111 saves and 15 clean sheets in 36 appearances during the Serie A season and conceded 34 goals. He called "a shame" the failure to secure a spot in UEFA Champions League for the next season.

Handanović started his fifth Inter Milan season on 21 August in the 2–0 away lose to Chievo. He made his 150th Serie A appearance for Inter on 25 September in the 1–1 home draw against Bologna. On 2 October, during the 2–1 defeat at Roma, Handanović made several saves, including one against Edin Džeko in the 86th minute which was hailed as the "save of the year" by the media. He captained Inter for the first time on 19 February of the following year in his 193rd appearance, taking the armband following Rodrigo Palacio's substitution and keeping a clean sheet in the 1–0 win over Bologna at Stadio Renato Dall'Ara.

==== 2017–2020: Return to the Champions League and captain's armband ====
On 1 December 2017, Handanović signed a new contract until June 2021. Eight days later, he was named Man of the Match after an impressive performance at Juventus, helping Inter to earn a goalless draw and to keep them undefeated after 16 Serie A weeks. He played his 200th Serie A match for Inter on 30 December in the goalless draw against Lazio which ended the first part of the season. Handanović's 400th overall Serie A match came on 17 April 2018, keeping a clean-sheet, his 7th in last eight matches, in the 4–0 home win versus Cagliari in round 33. He finished 2017–18 season by being ever-present in league, playing in every minute as Inter finished fourth, meaning they will play in Champions League for the first time in six years. With 17 clean-sheets, Handanović was ranked second along with Roma's Alisson in the clean-sheets list, equaling his personal best set in 2011–12 season. He conceded only 30 goals, his lowest tally since debuting in Serie A (including seasons where he has played 30 or more games).

Handanović made his Champions League debut with Inter in their opening group stage match against Tottenham Hotspur. This match was also his 250th appearance for the Nerazzurri in all competitions. In the first part of 2018–19 Serie A, he was able to collect ten clean sheets in 19 matches, most than any other goalkeeper in the league, and second only behind Liverpool's Alisson in Europe top five leagues; in addition, he also had 4th best save success rate.

On 13 February 2019, Inter announced via their official Twitter account that Handanović has been named new team captain, replacing Mauro Icardi. On 7 March, in the 0–0 draw against Eintracht Frankfurt in the first leg of 2018–19 UEFA Europa League round of 16, Handanović kept his 100th clean sheet on his 281st official appearance for the Nerazzurri. As the season progressed, Handanović reached another landmark, as the clean sheet he achieved in the 4–0 away win against Genoa, the first since December 2011, was his 150th in Serie A.

In the final match of the championship, he played a vital role in Inter's 2–1 home win over Empoli, making two decisive stoppage-time saves to deny the visitors the equaliser. His saves proved decisive for Inter, who earned another Champions League spot for the next season while Empoli was relegated back to Serie B. Before the match, he was awarded the inaugural Lega Serie A Best Goalkeeper award for the first time in his career. Handanović concluded his seventh season at Inter by being ever-present in league, playing in all 38 matches and keeping 17 clean-sheets, more than any other goalkeeper. With 17 clean sheets, he also equalled the club's all-time record for most clean sheets in a single Serie A season, which had previously been set by Júlio César in the 2009–10 Treble-winning season.

"The goalkeeper, Handanović, is certainly very important."

— Former club president Massimo Moratti, when asked which players in the current squad would have made it into the Treble-winning side.

Handanović began his first full season as Inter captain on 26 August 2019 by keeping a clean sheet in the 4–0 home win over newly promoted side Lecce; by doing so, he achieved his 200th Serie A victory. On 25 September, he made his 300th appearance for the club in a 1–0 home win against Lazio, the fifth in five matches, also making three important saves in the first half. His performance in the match earned the praise of the team's manager Antonio Conte, who said that Handanović "made the difference."

In the seventh match-day encounter against rivals and title favourites Juventus, Handanović made his 450th appearance in Serie A (182 for Udinese, 3 for Treviso, 1 for Lazio, and 264 for Inter) as Inter suffered a 2–1 defeat at San Siro, losing the top spot in the league to the Turin side. Later that month, he was nominated for the inaugural Lev Yashin award, the Ballon d'Or of goalkeepers. His first UEFA Champions League clean-sheet of his career came on 23 October, in a 2–0 home win over German side Borussia Dortmund, in the third group match of the competition.

In December, Handanović won the AIC Serie A Goalkeeper of the Year Award for the third time in his career. On 6 December, in the goalless draw against Roma, Handanović reached another milestone, as his clean-sheet in the match was his 100th in Serie A for Inter. On 11 January 2020, he saved a penalty against Luis Muriel in a 1–1 home draw against Atalanta; this was his 24th penalty save in Serie A, which saw him equal Pagluca's record of the most penalties saved in Serie A. On 21 August, he started in Inter's 3–2 defeat to Sevilla in the 2020 UEFA Europa League Final.

==== 2020–2023: First trophies, all-time penalty-saving record and retirement ====
On 17 October 2020, Handanović overtook Pagliuca's record with his 25th penalty save in Serie A when he saved a spot kick from Zlatan Ibrahimović, who went on to score from the rebound in a 2–1 defeat against rivals Milan. He made his 500th Serie A appearance on 14 February 2021, in a 3–1 home win over Lazio, which allowed Inter to climb to the top of the league table; he became only the 15th player ever to achieve this milestone. On 2 May the club won the title for the first time since 2010, the first trophy of his career. On 23 May, in Inter's final league match of the season against Udinese, he made his 329th Serie A appearance for the club, overtaking Walter Zenga as the goalkeeper with the most appearances in the Italian top flight for Inter.

On 21 September 2021, Handanović made two decisive first-half saves in the away match against Fiorentina, with Inter winning 3–1 after conceding initially; this was the 1,500th win in the Serie A for the Nerazzurri. Later on, he made his 400th appearance for the club in all competitions in a 3–1 home win over Sheriff Tiraspol in the Champions League group stage, becoming the only goalkeeper to do so. On 12 January 2022, Handanović won his second career trophy, the Supercoppa Italiana, as Inter defeated Juventus 2–1 at San Siro thanks to a 120th-minute winner by Alexis Sánchez.

Handanović began his eleventh Inter Milan season as a starter, however, he received criticism for his performances. Later on throughout the season, he lost his place in the starting lineup in favor of newly acquired André Onana. On 23 April 2023, in a 3–0 away win over Empoli, Handanović made his 563rd Serie A appearance, tying with Pietro Vierchowod as the seventh most capped player in the competition.

Inter announced Handanović's departure on 12 July 2023, after his contract was not extended. He played a total of 455 matches for the nerazzurri. Handanović subsequently retired from professional football in September 2023.

== International career ==
=== Debut and the first years ===
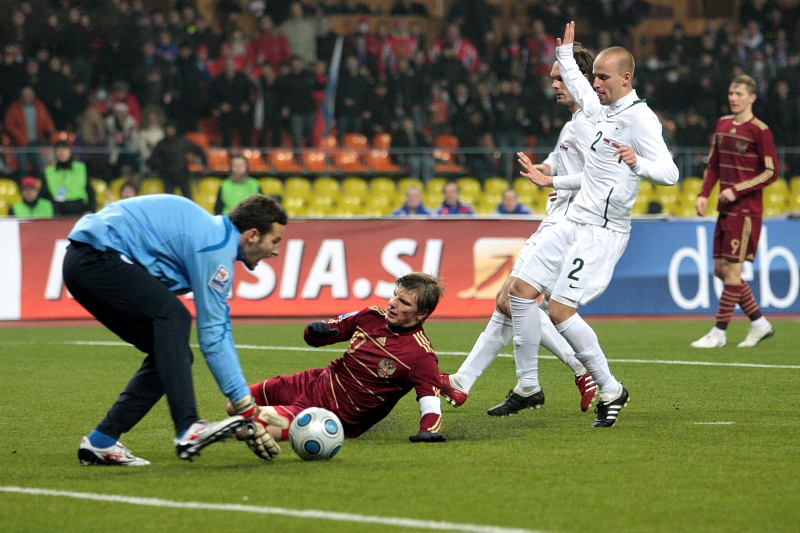
Handanović playing against Russia in the 2010 World Cup qualification

Handanović made his debut for Slovenia on 17 November 2004 in a friendly match against Slovakia, which ended in a goalless draw. He was a regular member of the team during the 2006 FIFA World Cup qualifying campaign, being used mostly as a backup for the veteran Borut Mavrič. However, in the second part of the qualifiers, he managed to play four matches, first being the 1–1 home draw against Belarus on 30 March 2005, failing to keep a clean sheet, as Slovenia finished the Group 5 in fourth place with twelve points, failing to secure a spot in the final tournament.

On 26 May 2008, Handanović captained Slovenia for the first time in his 23rd cap during the friendly match against Sweden, which won the game at Gamla Ullevi thanks to a Tobias Linderoth goal.

Ahead of the UEFA Euro 2008 qualifiers, Handanović was again the second-choice goalkeeper, with Mavrič retaining his spot. He started in Slovenia's fourth game of the qualifying campaign, a goalless draw away against Albania in March 2007. Handanović then played in the remaining eight matches, keeping his goal intact in three of them as Slovenia ended the qualifying campaign in the penultimate place with eleven points.

=== 2010 World Cup, Euro 2016 qualifying and retirement ===
Handanović was ever-presented in the 2010 FIFA World Cup qualifying, playing every single minute of the qualifying campaign. Slovenia began the qualifiers with a 1–1 away draw against Poland, where Handanović was beaten in 17th minute to a Michał Żewłakow penalty kick.

In June 2010, Handanović was named in Slovenia's final list of 23 players to represent the country at the 2010 FIFA World Cup. Slovenia was placed in Group C with Algeria, England and the United States. In the team's opening match against Algeria, Handanović debuted for the first time in a major tournament, keeping a clean sheet as Slovenia managed to win 1–0 at Peter Mokaba Stadium to grab their first three points. In the next match, against the United States at Ellis Park Stadium, Slovenia was leading 2–0 at half time, but in the second half Handanović was beaten by Landon Donovan and Michael Bradley, with the match finishing 2–2. Slovenia were eliminated from the tournament after finishing third in their group with four points, behind the United States and England, following a 1–0 defeat to the latter in their final match at Nelson Mandela Bay Stadium on 23 June.

On 18 November 2015, Handanović announced his retirement from the national team after Slovenia failed to qualify for UEFA Euro 2016, crashing out with a 3–1 aggregate defeat to Ukraine in the play-offs. He ended his eleven-year international career with 81 caps for Slovenia, being one of the most capped players of all time; his starting position was taken over by Jan Oblak.

== Style of play ==
"I definitely think that he'll surpass my record. He is young and he’s got many years in front of him. What’s more, his average is already superior to mine. My number of saves is greater just because of our ages, but he'll soon surpass me there too. After all, records are made to be broken and Handanović is a fantastic goalkeeper. So, when that happens, it will be a[n] honour to be surpassed."

— Gianluca Pagliuca, the former record holder for most penalties saved in Serie A, on Handanović.

Despite his large stature and imposing physique, which made him effective at handling crosses and a commanding presence inside the box, Handanović was an extremely agile and athletic goalkeeper, who was renowned in particular for his outstanding reflexes, acrobatic saves and excellent shot-stopping abilities, as well as his positional sense, leadership, and ability to organise his defence. Although he was not initially known for being particularly adept with the ball at his feet, during his time under managers Roberto Mancini and Luciano Spalletti, he was also able to improve his ability to play out and start attacks from the back, and successfully adapted to the team's more patient build-up play, while also allowing the team to maintain a high line; his change in playing style also continued under Inter's subsequent manager Antonio Conte, under whom he further developed his control and distribution of the ball, and often acted as a sweeper-keeper.

Regarded as one of the best goalkeepers in Europe and Italy due to his performances, Handanović was also known for his speed off his line and anticipation as a goalkeeper, which enabled him to clear the ball away from danger, as well as his ability to get to ground quickly to parry or collect the ball, attributes which also made him particularly adept at stopping spot-kicks. As a result, he developed a reputation as an exceptional penalty-kick-saving specialist, having stopped an Italian record of six consecutive penalties between 2013 and 2015.

With 26 saves, Handanović holds the record for most penalties stopped in Serie A, ahead of Gianluca Pagliuca, although Handanović had a superior success rate. Former Inter goalkeeper Giuliano Sarti also praised Handanović for his consistency. In a 2016 interview, Handanović stated that his main influences as a goalkeeper were his cousin Jasmin Handanović and Peter Schmeichel. In 2020, Pasquale Marino described Handanović as "one of the best goalkeepers in the world."

== Coaching career ==
After retirement, Handanović stayed at Inter Milan as a technical collaborator. On 1 August 2024, he was appointed in charge of the under-17 team.

== Personal life ==
Born in Ljubljana on 14 July 1984, Handanović is of Bosniak origin. His elder cousin, Jasmin Handanović, is also a former international football goalkeeper. Handanović's first son, Alen, was born in 2011. In May 2012, Handanović married Zoja Trobec, a former KK Olimpija cheerleader. In 2013, she gave birth to the couple's second son, named Ian.

== Career statistics ==
=== Club ===
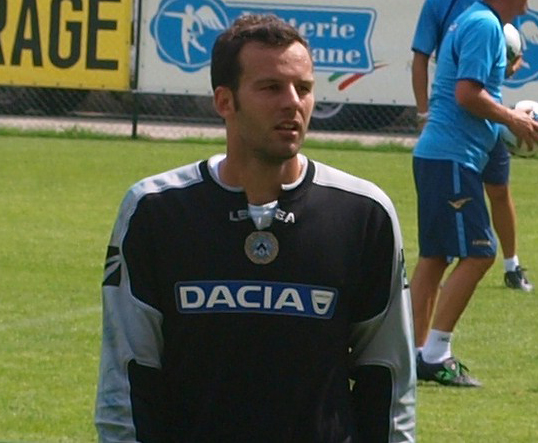
Handanović with Udinese in 2011

Appearances and goals by club, season and competition
Club	Season	League			National cup (Note: Includes Coppa Italia)		Continental		Other		Total	
Club	Season	Division	Apps	Goals	Apps	Goals	Apps	Goals	Apps	Goals	Apps	Goals
Domžale	2003–04	1. SNL	7	0	0	0	—		—		7	0
Zagorje (loan)	2003–04	2. SNL	11	0	—		—		—		11	0
Udinese	2004–05	Serie A	3	0	2	0	—		—		5	0
Udinese	2007–08	Serie A	35	0	1	0	—		—		36	0
Udinese	2008–09	Serie A	34	0	1	0	10 (Note: Appearance(s) in UEFA Cup)	0	—		45	0
Udinese	2009–10	Serie A	37	0	3	0	—		—		40	0
Udinese	2010–11	Serie A	35	0	0	0	—		—		35	0
Udinese	2011–12	Serie A	38	0	1	0	12 (Note: Two appearances in UEFA Champions League, ten appearances in UEFA Europa League)	0	—		51	0
Udinese	Total		182	0	8	0	22	0	—		212	0
Treviso (loan)	2005–06	Serie A	3	0	0	0	—		—		3	0
Lazio (loan)	2005–06	Serie A	1	0	0	0	—		—		1	0
Rimini (loan)	2006–07	Serie B	39	0	2	0	—		—		41	0
Inter Milan	2012–13	Serie A	35	0	3	0	10 (Note: Appearance(s) in UEFA Europa League)	0	—		48	0
Inter Milan	2013–14	Serie A	36	0	1	0	—		—		37	0
Inter Milan	2014–15	Serie A	37	0	0	0	3	0	—		40	0
Inter Milan	2015–16	Serie A	36	0	2	0	—		—		38	0
Inter Milan	2016–17	Serie A	37	0	1	0	5	0	—		43	0
Inter Milan	2017–18	Serie A	38	0	1	0	—		—		39	0
Inter Milan	2018–19	Serie A	38	0	1	0	10 (Note: Six appearances in UEFA Champions League, four appearances in UEFA Europa League)	0	—		49	0
Inter Milan	2019–20	Serie A	35	0	3	0	10	0	—		48	0
Inter Milan	2020–21	Serie A	37	0	4	0	6 (Note: Appearance(s) in UEFA Champions League)	0	—		47	0
Inter Milan	2021–22	Serie A	37	0	4	0	8	0	1 (Note: Appearance(s) in Supercoppa Italiana)	0	50	0
Inter Milan	2022–23	Serie A	14	0	2	0	0	0	0	0	16	0
Inter Milan	Total		380	0	22	0	52	0	1	0	455	0
Career total			623	0	32	0	74	0	1	0	730	0

=== International ===
Appearances and goals by national team and year
National team	Year	Apps	Goals
Slovenia
Slovenia	2004	1	0
Slovenia	2005	6	0
Slovenia	2006	2	0
Slovenia	2007	11	0
Slovenia	2008	9	0
Slovenia	2009	8	0
Slovenia	2010	11	0
Slovenia	2011	7	0
Slovenia	2012	5	0
Slovenia	2013	8	0
Slovenia	2014	6	0
Slovenia	2015	7	0
Total		81	0

== Honours ==
Inter Milan

- Serie A: 2020–21
- Coppa Italia: 2021–22, 2022–23
- Supercoppa Italiana: 2021, 2022
- UEFA Europa League runner-up: 2019–20
- UEFA Champions League runner-up: 2022–23

Individual

- Slovenian Footballer of the Year: 2009, 2011, 2012
- Serie A Team of the Year: 2010–11, 2012–13, 2018–19
- AIC Serie A Goalkeeper of the Year: 2011, 2013, 2019
- Lega Serie A Goalkeeper of the Year: 2018–19
- UEFA Europa League Squad of the Season: 2019–20
