= Benjamin Šeško =

Slovenian footballer (born 2003)

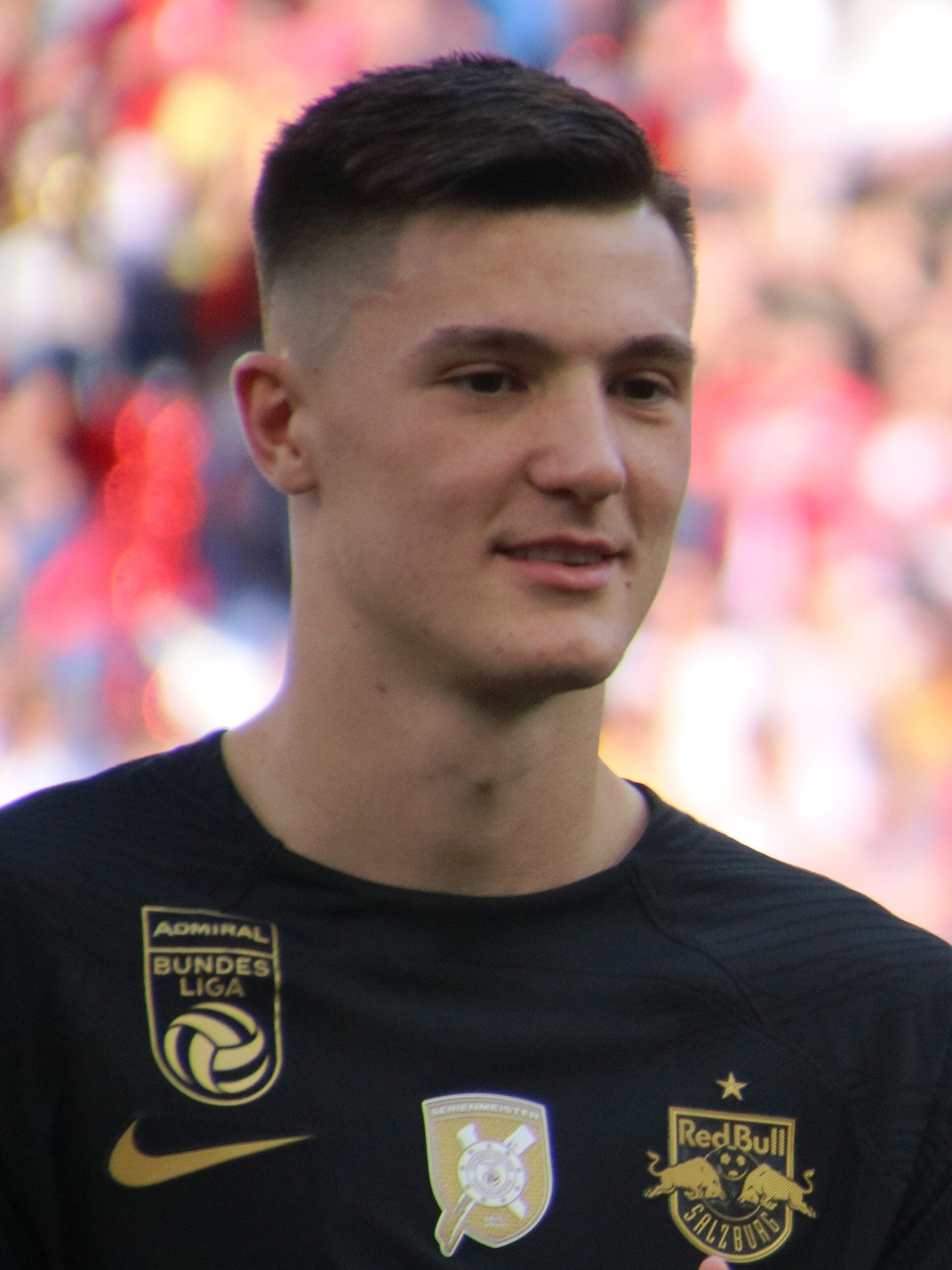
- Šeško with Red Bull Salzburg in 2023

Personal information
- Full name: Benjamin Šeško
- Date of birth: 31 May 2003 (age 23)
- Place of birth: Radeče, Slovenia
- Height: 1.95 m (6 ft 5 in)
- Position: Striker

Team information
- Current team: Manchester United
- Number: 30

Youth career
- 2010–2013: Radeče
- 2013–2014: Rudar Trbovlje
- 2014–2016: Radeče
- 2016–2018: Krško
- 2018–2019: Domžale

Senior career*
Years	Team	Apps	(Gls)
2019–2023	Red Bull Salzburg	55	(21)
2019–2021	→ FC Liefering (loan)	44	(22)
2023–2025	RB Leipzig	64	(27)
2025–	Manchester United	34	(12)

International career^{‡}
2017–2018	Slovenia U15	6	(4)
2018	Slovenia U16	4	(4)
2018–2019	Slovenia U17	14	(5)
2020	Slovenia U19	1	(0)
2021–	Slovenia	45	(16)
- * Club domestic league appearances and goals as of 17:25, 13 September 2026 (UTC) ‡ National team caps and goals as of 11:18, 14 October 2025 (UTC)

Benjamin Šeško (pronounced [ˈbeːnjamin ˈʃɛːʃkɔ], born 31 May 2003) is a Slovenian professional footballer who plays as a striker for Premier League club Manchester United and the Slovenia national team.

Šeško joined Red Bull Salzburg aged 16 in 2019 from Domžale. He was loaned to the Salzburg's reserve team FC Liefering for two seasons, where he scored 22 goals in 44 games in the second tier of Austrian football. He made his first-team debut for Red Bull Salzburg in January 2021 and went on to win three Austrian Bundesliga titles and one Austrian Cup. In July 2023, Šeško joined German club RB Leipzig, where he scored 39 goals in 87 appearances over two seasons, and won one DFL-Supercup.

Šeško represented Slovenia at youth international level, and made his senior debut in 2021 at the age of 18, becoming the youngest player to play for Slovenia at the time. That same year, he also scored his first national team goal, making him the youngest scorer in Slovenia's history.

== Club career ==
=== Early career ===
Šeško began his career at his hometown club Radeče when he was in the first grade. He then spent one year with Rudar Trbovlje in the under-11 selection, before returning to Radeče. In 2016 he transferred to Krško, where he played for the under-15s and under-17s. In the 2017–18 season, he scored 59 goals in 23 matches for the under-15s. In 2018, Šeško joined Domžale, where he stayed for one season.

=== Red Bull Salzburg ===
At the age of 16, on 3 June 2019, Šeško signed a three-year professional contract with Red Bull Salzburg. He debuted with Red Bull Salzburg in a 3–0 Austrian Football Bundesliga win over TSV Hartberg on 30 January 2021.

==== Loan to FC Liefering ====
Immediately after signing with Red Bull Salzburg, he was moved to their farm club FC Liefering, competing in the Austrian Second League. In the 2020–21 season, he scored 21 goals in 29 appearances and became the league's second-best goalscorer. He scored most of his goals in the final part of the season, scoring 13 goals in the last 7 rounds.

=== RB Leipzig ===
On 9 August 2022, RB Leipzig announced that Šeško would join them on 1 July 2023, on a five-year contract until 2028, for a reported transfer fee of around €24 million.

On 3 September 2023, Šeško scored his first goals for RB Leipzig by netting a brace in a 3–0 away win over Union Berlin, which ended their 24-match streak without loss at home. On 19 September, he scored his first UEFA Champions League goal (excluding qualifying rounds) as RB Leipzig defeated Young Boys 3–1 away from home in the matchday 1 of the 2023–24 edition. Šeško finished his first season with 18 goals across all competitions, and also became the youngest ever player to score in seven consecutive Bundesliga games at 20 years and 353 days.

In June 2024, Arsenal, Chelsea, Manchester United and AC Milan all pursued Šeško, but he decided to stay with RB Leipzig, extending his existing contract by another year until 2029. During the 2024–25 season, he emerged as RB Leipzig's top scorer, setting a personal record with 21 goals in all competitions.

=== Manchester United ===
On 9 August 2025, Premier League club Manchester United announced the signing of Šeško on a five-year contract until 2030, thus becoming the first-ever Slovenian to represent the club. The transfer fee was reported to be an initial €76.5 million, with an additional €8.5 million in performance related add-ons. On 17 August, he made his debut for the club, as a substitute, in a 1–0 loss against Arsenal in the opening round of the Premier League. A month later, on 27 September, he netted his first goal for the club in a 3–1 away defeat against Brentford.

In the first part of the 2025–26 season, Šeško scored just twice in 16 appearances under manager Ruben Amorim. However, at the beginning of January 2026, Amorim was dismissed from the head coach role of Manchester United and was replaced by interim manager Darren Fletcher in the short term, then Michael Carrick for the rest of the season. The managerial change coincided with Šeško entering a strong goalscoring run, with six goals throughout the months of January and February, which included stoppage time goals against Fulham and West Ham. For his performances, he won the Manchester United Player of the Month award for February. He concluded his debut season as the club's joint top scorer with 11 league goals, alongside Bryan Mbeumo.

== International career ==
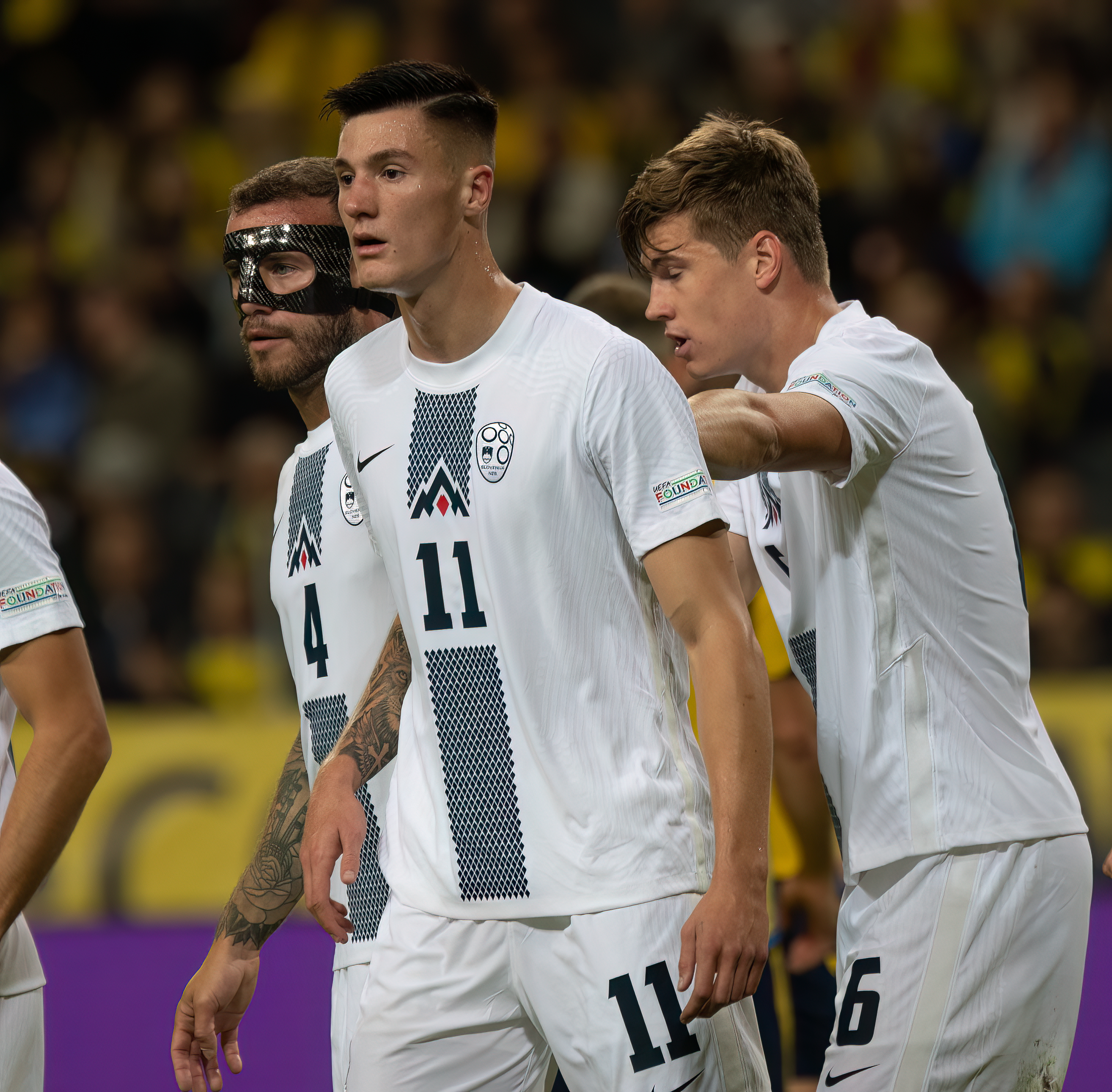
Šeško (number 11) with Slovenia in 2022

Eligible for Slovenia and Bosnia and Herzegovina (due to his mother hailing from Doboj), Šeško opted for the former, having represented the country at the under-15, under-16, under-17, and under-19 levels. He made his under-19 debut in a friendly game against Austria in September 2020.

In May 2021, Šeško was called up by the senior team manager Matjaž Kek for a pair of friendlies in June 2021. He debuted for Slovenia in a 1–1 friendly tie with North Macedonia on 1 June 2021. At the time he was 18 years and 1 day old and became the youngest debutant in the national team, surpassing the previous record set by Petar Stojanović seven years earlier. On 8 October 2021, Šeško scored his first goal for Slovenia in the 2022 FIFA World Cup qualification match against Malta, becoming Slovenia's youngest ever goalscorer at the age of 18 years, 4 months and 8 days.

"I have no doubt whatsoever that Šeško will surpass me. I look at my record like it's gone. It's the past. He will definitely correct those numbers."

— Slovenia's all-time top goalscorer Zlatko Zahovič (35 goals) in September 2022 about the then 19-year-old Šeško, who at the time scored four national team goals.

During the 2022–23 UEFA Nations League B campaign, Šeško helped Slovenia avoid relegation to League C with two decisive goals. He provided an assist and scored the winning goal in a 2–1 victory over Norway on 24 September 2022, and also scored in a 1–1 draw against Sweden three days later. The goal against Sweden was described as a "wonder goal" by the media, and was nominated as one of the best goals of the matchday by UEFA.

Šeško was Slovenia's top scorer in the UEFA Euro 2024 qualifiers, netting five goals from nine appearances in Group H as Slovenia qualified for its first European Championship since 2000. He was later named in the squad for the final tournament, where he played in all four Slovenia's matches. The team advanced to the knockout stages for the first time and was eliminated by Portugal in the round of 16 on penalties.

On 9 September 2024, Šeško scored his first international hat-trick in a 3–0 victory over Kazakhstan in the 2024–25 UEFA Nations League B.

== Style of play ==
Šeško is described as a tall, athletic centre-forward known for his powerful finishing, explosive pace, and aerial ability, standing at 1.95 m (6 ft 5 in). He has also recorded a top speed of 35.7 km/h, which is just 1.5 km/h slower than the fastest player in the Bundesliga.

Upon signing for Manchester United, Šeško was considered one of the most promising young strikers in Europe. His combination of physical strength and technical ability has led to comparisons with Zlatan Ibrahimović, who he cited as a role model during his formative years. Recruitment analysts have described Šeško as a clinical forward capable of dropping into space, holding off defenders, and linking effectively with teammates in advanced positions.

While he initially operated primarily as a penalty-box striker, Šeško has gradually expanded his involvement in the build-up phase, becoming more engaged in general play around the final third. He has shown improvement in his link-up play and movement off the ball, often dropping deeper to support attacking transitions and contribute to team possession beyond just finishing chances.

== Career statistics ==
=== Club ===
As of match played 16 September 2026

Appearances and goals by club, season and competition
Club	Season	League			National cup (Note: Includes Austrian Cup, DFB-Pokal, FA Cup)		League cup (Note: Includes EFL Cup)		Continental		Other		Total	
Club	Season	Division	Apps	Goals	Apps	Goals	Apps	Goals	Apps	Goals	Apps	Goals	Apps	Goals
FC Liefering (loan)	2019–20	Austrian 2. Liga	15	1	—		—		—		—		15	1
FC Liefering (loan)	2020–21	Austrian 2. Liga	29	21	—		—		—		—		29	21
FC Liefering (loan)	Total		44	22	—		—		—		—		44	22
Red Bull Salzburg	2020–21	Austrian Bundesliga	1	0	0	0	—		0	0	—		1	0
Red Bull Salzburg	2021–22	Austrian Bundesliga	24	5	5	5	—		8 (Note: Appearances in UEFA Champions League)	1	—		37	11
Red Bull Salzburg	2022–23	Austrian Bundesliga	30	16	4	2	—		7 (Note: Six appearances in UEFA Champions League, one appearance in UEFA Europa League)	0	—		41	18
Red Bull Salzburg	Total		55	21	9	7	—		15	1	—		79	29
RB Leipzig	2023–24	Bundesliga	31	14	2	2	—		8	2	1 (Note: Appearance in DFL-Supercup)	0	42	18
RB Leipzig	2024–25	Bundesliga	33	13	4	4	—		8	4	—		45	21
RB Leipzig	Total		64	27	6	6	—		16	6	1	0	87	39
Manchester United	2025–26	Premier League	30	11	1	1	1	0	—		—		32	12
Manchester United	2026–27	Premier League	4	1	0	0	1	0	1	1	—		6	2
Manchester United	Total		34	12	1	1	2	0	1	1	—		38	14
Career total			197	82	16	14	2	0	32	8	1	0	248	104

=== International ===
As of match played 13 October 2025

Appearances and goals by national team and year
National team	Year	Apps	Goals
Slovenia	2021	7	1
Slovenia	2022	10	4
Slovenia	2023	9	5
Slovenia	2024	13	6
Slovenia	2025	6	0
Total		45	16

Scores and results list Slovenia's goal tally first, score column indicates score after each Šeško goal

List of international goals scored by Benjamin Šeško
No.	Date	Venue	Cap	Opponent	Score	Result	Competition
1	8 October 2021	National Stadium, Ta' Qali, Malta	6	Malta	4–0	4–0	2022 FIFA World Cup qualification
2	12 June 2022	Stožice Stadium, Ljubljana, Slovenia	13	Serbia	2–2	2–2	2022–23 UEFA Nations League B
3	24 September 2022	Stožice Stadium, Ljubljana, Slovenia	14	Norway	2–1	2–1	2022–23 UEFA Nations League B
4	27 September 2022	Friends Arena, Solna, Sweden	15	Sweden	1–0	1–1	2022–23 UEFA Nations League B
5	17 November 2022	Cluj Arena, Cluj-Napoca, Romania	16	Romania	1–0	2–1	Friendly
6	26 March 2023	Stožice Stadium, Ljubljana, Slovenia	19	San Marino	1–0	2–0	UEFA Euro 2024 qualifying
7	7 September 2023	Stožice Stadium, Ljubljana, Slovenia	22	Northern Ireland	3–1	4–2	UEFA Euro 2024 qualifying
8	14 October 2023	Stožice Stadium, Ljubljana, Slovenia	23	Finland	1–0	3–0	UEFA Euro 2024 qualifying
9	14 October 2023	Stožice Stadium, Ljubljana, Slovenia	23	Finland	2–0	3–0	UEFA Euro 2024 qualifying
10	20 November 2023	Stožice Stadium, Ljubljana, Slovenia	26	Kazakhstan	1–0	2–1	UEFA Euro 2024 qualifying
11	21 March 2024	National Stadium, Ta' Qali, Malta	27	Malta	2–2	2–2	Friendly
12	6 September 2024	Stožice Stadium, Ljubljana, Slovenia	34	Austria	1–0	1–1	2024–25 UEFA Nations League B
13	9 September 2024	Stožice Stadium, Ljubljana, Slovenia	35	Kazakhstan	1–0	3–0	2024–25 UEFA Nations League B
14	9 September 2024	Stožice Stadium, Ljubljana, Slovenia	35	Kazakhstan	2–0	3–0	2024–25 UEFA Nations League B
15	9 September 2024	Stožice Stadium, Ljubljana, Slovenia	35	Kazakhstan	3–0	3–0	2024–25 UEFA Nations League B
16	14 November 2024	Stožice Stadium, Ljubljana, Slovenia	38	Norway	1–1	1–4	2024–25 UEFA Nations League B

== Honours ==
Red Bull Salzburg

- Austrian Bundesliga: 2020–21, 2021–22, 2022–23
- Austrian Cup: 2021–22

RB Leipzig

- DFL-Supercup: 2023

Individual

- Slovenian Footballer of the Year: 2022
- Slovenian Youth Footballer of the Year: 2021, 2022, 2023, 2024
- PFA Premier League Fans' Player of the Month: February 2026
