= Slovenian Footballer of the Year =

Annual Slovenian association football award by EkipaSN

The Slovenian Footballer of the Year is an association football award presented annually by the Slovenian magazine Ekipa.

== Slovenian Footballer of the Year ==
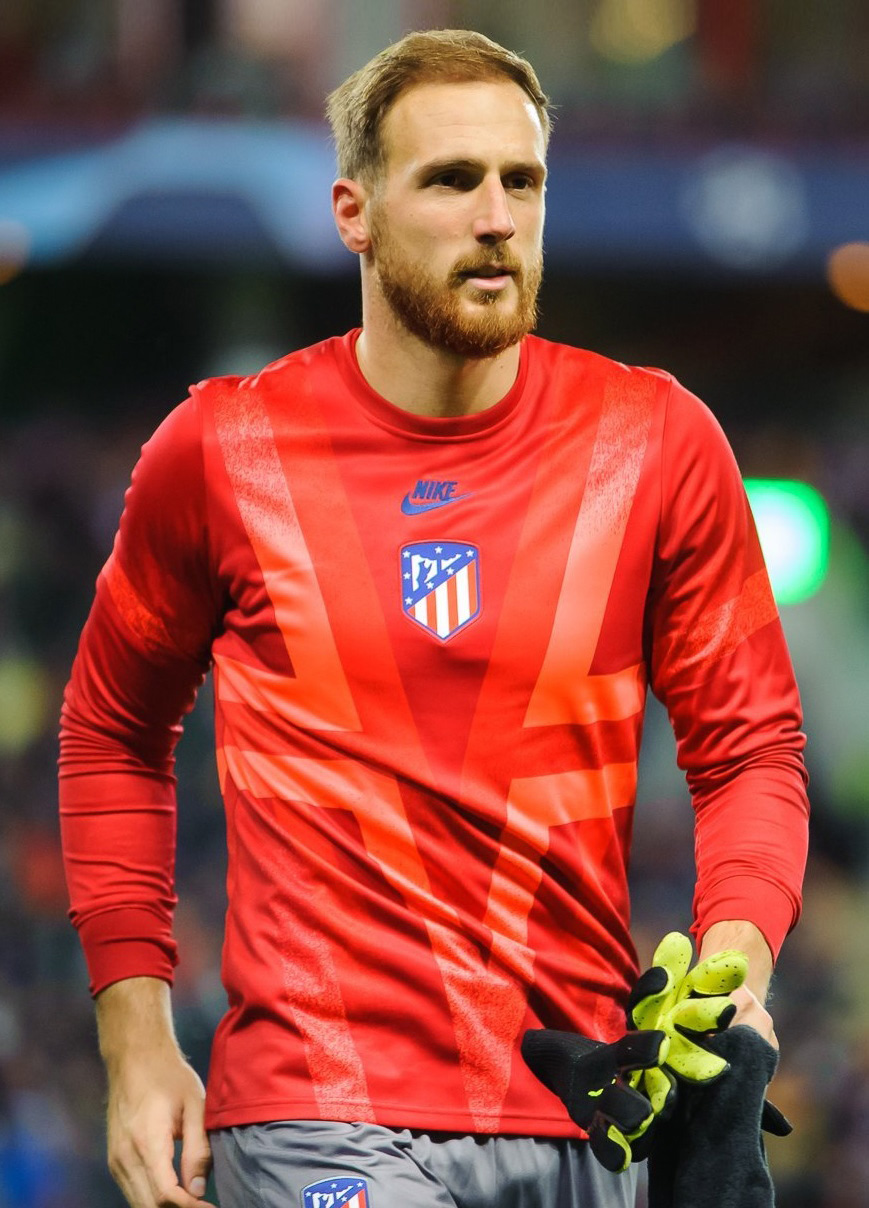
Jan Oblak has won the award nine times.

Year	Player	Club(s)
2008	Milivoje Novaković	(Germany) 1. FC Köln
2009	Samir Handanović	(Italy) Udinese
2010	Valter Birsa	(France) Auxerre
2011	Samir Handanović (2)	(Italy) Udinese
2012	Samir Handanović (3)	(Italy) Udinese and (Italy) Internazionale
2013	Kevin Kampl	(Austria) Red Bull Salzburg
2014	Kevin Kampl (2)	(Austria) Red Bull Salzburg
2015	Jan Oblak	(Spain) Atlético Madrid
2016	Jan Oblak (2)	(Spain) Atlético Madrid
2017	Jan Oblak (3)	(Spain) Atlético Madrid
2018	Jan Oblak (4)	(Spain) Atlético Madrid
2019	Josip Iličić	(Italy) Atalanta
2020	Jan Oblak (5)	(Spain) Atlético Madrid
2021	Jan Oblak (6)	(Spain) Atlético Madrid
2022	Benjamin Šeško	(Austria) Red Bull Salzburg
2023	Jan Oblak (7)	(Spain) Atlético Madrid
2024	Jan Oblak (8)	(Spain) Atlético Madrid
2025	Jan Oblak (9)	(Spain) Atlético Madrid

== Slovenian Youth Footballer of the Year ==
Year	Player	Club(s)
2008	Etien Velikonja	(Slovenia) Gorica
2009	Rene Krhin	(Italy) Internazionale
2010	Armin Bačinović	(Slovenia) Maribor and (Italy) Palermo
2011	Dejan Lazarević	(Italy) Torino and (Italy) Padova
2012	Jan Oblak	(Portugal) União de Leiria and (Portugal) Rio Ave
2013	Jan Oblak (2)	(Portugal) Rio Ave and (Portugal) Benfica
2014	Petar Stojanović	(Slovenia) Veržej and (Slovenia) Maribor
2015	Andraž Šporar	(Slovenia) Olimpija Ljubljana
2016	Luka Zahović	(Netherlands) Heerenveen and (Slovenia) Maribor
2017	Jan Repas	(Slovenia) Domžale and (France) Caen
2018	Jaka Bijol	(Slovenia) Rudar Velenje and (Russia) CSKA Moscow
2019	Jaka Bijol (2)	(Russia) CSKA Moscow
2020	Aljoša Matko	(Slovenia) Bravo and (Slovenia) Maribor
2021	Benjamin Šeško	(Austria) FC Liefering and (Austria) Red Bull Salzburg
2022	Benjamin Šeško (2)	(Austria) Red Bull Salzburg
2023	Benjamin Šeško (3)	(Austria) Red Bull Salzburg and (Germany) RB Leipzig
2024	Benjamin Šeško (4)	(Germany) RB Leipzig
2025	Luka Topalović	(Italy) Internazionale
