= Jwani Riad Noseir =

Egyptian basketball player

Personal information
- Nationality: Egyptian
- Born: 6 February 1913
- Died: 16 February 2005 (aged 92); Cairo, Egypt

Sport
- Sport: Basketball

Jwani Riad Noseir (Arabic: جواني رياض نصير; 6 February 1913 – 16 February 2005) was an Egyptian basketball player. He competed in the men's tournament at the 1936 Summer Olympics. His brother Kamal Riad Noseir was also a basketball player.
