= Jean-François Dubessay =

French field hockey player

Jean-François Dubessay (1 April 1921 – 15 February 2005) was a French field hockey player who competed in the 1948 Summer Olympics and in the 1952 Summer Olympics.
