= Vic Emery (cricketer) =

Australian cricketer

Personal information
- Full name: Victor Rupert Emery
- Born: 24 December 1920; Sydney, Australia
- Died: 14 February 2005 (aged 84); Sydney, Australia
- Source: ESPNcricinfo, 26 December 2016

Vic Emery (24 December 1920 – 14 February 2005) was an Australian cricketer. He played five first-class matches for New South Wales in 1948/49.

== See also ==
- List of New South Wales representative cricketers
