= Miklós Kovacsics =

Hungarian handball player (1953-2005)

Miklós Kovacsics (April 20, 1953 – February 2, 2005) was a Hungarian handball player who competed in the 1980 Summer Olympics. He was born in Pécs. In 1980 he played three matches as a member of the Hungarian team which finished fourth in the Olympic tournament.
