= Nedžad Botonjič =

Slovenian footballer

Personal information
- Date of birth: 25 August 1977
- Date of death: 7 February 2005 (aged 27)
- Height: 1.92 m (6 ft 4 in)
- Position: Goalkeeper

Senior career*
Years	Team	Apps	(Gls)
1993–1994	Optimizem Svoboda	1	(0)
1996–1997	Korotan Prevalje	22	(0)
1997–1998	HIT Gorica	15	(0)
1999–2000	Dravograd	42	(0)
2001–2003	Mura	64	(0)
2003–2005	NK Ljubljana	44	(0)
Total		188	(0)
- * Club domestic league appearances and goals

Nedžad Botonjič (25 August 1977 – 7 February 2005) was a Slovenian football goalkeeper. He played for NK Ljubljana when suffering a heart attack during a training session in 2005.
