= 2024–25 Atlético Madrid season =

Atlético Madrid
2024–25 season
- President: Enrique Cerezo
- Head coach: Diego Simeone
- Stadium: Cívitas Metropolitano (until 9 October); Riyadh Air Metropolitano (from 9 October)
- La Liga: 3rd
- Copa del Rey: Semi-finals
- UEFA Champions League: Round of 16
- FIFA Club World Cup: Group stage
- Top goalscorer: League: Alexander Sørloth (20); All: Julián Alvarez (29)
- Average home league attendance: 60,883
- Biggest win: 6–0 vs Sparta Prague (A)
- Biggest defeat: 0–4 vs Benfica (A); 0–4 vs Paris Saint-Germain (N)
Home colours	Away colours	Third colours

The 2024–25 season was the 122nd season in the history of Atlético Madrid, and the club's 23rd consecutive season in La Liga. In addition to the domestic league, the club participated in the Copa del Rey, the UEFA Champions League, and the FIFA Club World Cup.

Following the club's 1–0 win over Osasuna on 12 January 2025, Atlético broke its own all-time record of fourteen consecutive victories in all competitions.

== Kits ==
Home	Home alt	Away	Third	Home Club World Cup (2025–26 home)	Home alt. Club World Cup (2025–26 home)	Away Club World Cup (2025–26 away)

== Players ==
=== First-team squad ===
As of 27 August 2024.

Note: Flags indicate national team as defined under FIFA eligibility rules; some limited exceptions apply. Players may hold more than one non-FIFA nationality.

No.	Pos.	Nation	Player
1	GK	ARG	Juan Musso (on loan from Atalanta)
2	DF	URU	José Giménez (3rd captain)
3	DF	ESP	César Azpilicueta
4	MF	ENG	Conor Gallagher
5	MF	ARG	Rodrigo De Paul
6	MF	ESP	Koke (captain)
7	FW	FRA	Antoine Griezmann
8	MF	ESP	Pablo Barrios
9	FW	NOR	Alexander Sørloth
10	FW	ARG	Ángel Correa
11	MF	FRA	Thomas Lemar
12	MF	BRA	Samuel Lino

No.	Pos.	Nation	Player
13	GK	SLO	Jan Oblak (vice-captain)
14	MF	ESP	Marcos Llorente
15	DF	FRA	Clément Lenglet (on loan from Barcelona)
16	DF	ARG	Nahuel Molina
17	MF	ESP	Rodrigo Riquelme
19	FW	ARG	Julián Alvarez
20	DF	BEL	Axel Witsel
21	DF	ESP	Javi Galán
22	FW	ARG	Giuliano Simeone
23	DF	MOZ	Reinildo Mandava
24	DF	ESP	Robin Le Normand

=== Reserve team ===
Note: Flags indicate national team as defined under FIFA eligibility rules; some limited exceptions apply. Players may hold more than one non-FIFA nationality.

No.	Pos.	Nation	Player
27	DF	GRE	Ilias Kostis
28	MF	ESP	Aitor Gismera
29	MF	ESP	Javi Serrano
31	GK	ESP	Antonio Gomis
32	FW	ESP	Adrián Niño
33	GK	ESP	Alejandro Iturbe

No.	Pos.	Nation	Player
34	GK	ESP	Salvi Esquivel
38	MF	ESP	Taufik Seidu
40	MF	ESP	Rayane Belaid
41	DF	ESP	Carlos Giménez
43	DF	ARG	Gerónimo Spina
47	FW	ESP	Omar Janneh

=== Out on loan ===
Note: Flags indicate national team as defined under FIFA eligibility rules; some limited exceptions apply. Players may hold more than one non-FIFA nationality.

No.	Pos.	Nation	Player
—	GK	ROU	Horațiu Moldovan (at Real Oviedo until 30 June 2026)
—	MF	ESP	Saúl (at Sevilla until 30 June 2025)
—	FW	ESP	Carlos Martín (at Alavés until 30 June 2025)
—	FW	MAR	Salim El Jebari (at Cartagena until 30 June 2025)

== Transfers ==
=== In ===
Pos.	Player	From	Type	Fee	Date	Source
DF	(Spain) Javi Galán	(Spain) Real Sociedad	Loan return		30 June 2024	
FW	(Argentina) Giuliano Simeone	(Spain) Alavés	Loan return		30 June 2024	
FW	(Portugal) João Félix	(Spain) Barcelona	Loan return		30 June 2024	
DF	(Turkey) Çağlar Söyüncü	(Turkey) Fenerbahçe	Loan return		30 June 2024	
FW	(Spain) Samu Aghehowa	(Spain) Alavés	Loan return		30 June 2024	
DF	(Uruguay) Santiago Mouriño	(Spain) Zaragoza	Loan return		30 June 2024	
FW	(Spain) Germán Valera	(Spain) Zaragoza	Loan return		30 June 2024	
FW	(Spain) Carlos Martín	(Spain) Mirandés	Loan return		30 June 2024	
FW	(Spain) Borja Garcés	(Spain) Elche	Loan return		30 June 2024	
FW	(Spain) Víctor Mollejo	(Spain) Zaragoza	Loan return		30 June 2024	
MF	(Spain) Javi Serrano	(Austria) Sturm Graz	Loan return		30 June 2024	
DF	(Spain) Robin Le Normand	(Spain) Real Sociedad	Transfer	€34.5M	27 July 2024	
FW	(Norway) Alexander Sørloth	(Spain) Villarreal	Transfer	€32M	3 August 2024	
FW	(Argentina) Julián Alvarez	(England) Manchester City	Transfer	€75M	12 August 2024	
MF	(England) Conor Gallagher	(England) Chelsea	Transfer	€42M	21 August 2024	
DF	(France) Clément Lenglet	(Spain) Barcelona	Loan	€3M	26 August 2024	
GK	(Argentina) Juan Musso	(Italy) Atalanta	Loan	€1.5M	27 August 2024	

Total expenditure: ▼€188 million (excluding potential add-ons, bonuses and undisclosed figures)

=== Out ===
Pos.	Player	To	Type	Fee	Date	Source
DF	(Brazil) Gabriel Paulista	(Turkey) Beşiktaş	End of contract		1 July 2024	
FW	(Netherlands) Memphis Depay	(Brazil) Corinthians	End of contract		1 July 2024	
DF	(Spain) Mario Hermoso	(Italy) Roma	End of contract		1 July 2024	
DF	(Turkey) Çağlar Söyüncü	(Turkey) Fenerbahçe	Transfer	€8.5M	1 July 2024	
MF	(Spain) Saúl	(Spain) Sevilla	Loan		15 July 2024	
FW	(Spain) Álvaro Morata	(Italy) Milan	Transfer	€13M	19 July 2024	
DF	(Montenegro) Stefan Savić	(Turkey) Trabzonspor	Transfer	Free	26 July 2024	
FW	(Spain) Carlos Martín	(Spain) Alavés	Loan		17 August 2024	
FW	(Portugal) João Félix	(England) Chelsea	Transfer	€52M	21 August 2024	
GK	(Romania) Horațiu Moldovan	(Italy) Sassuolo	Loan	€0.5M	23 August 2024	
FW	(Spain) Samu Aghehowa	(Portugal) Porto	Transfer	€15M	24 August 2024	
MF	(Belgium) Arthur Vermeeren	(Germany) RB Leipzig	Loan	€3M	26 August 2024	
DF	(Uruguay) Santiago Mouriño	(Spain) Alavés	Transfer	€2M	27 August 2024	
FW	(Portugal) Marcos Paulo	(Belgium) Molenbeek	Loan		29 August 2024	
FW	(Spain) Germán Valera	(Spain) Valencia	Transfer	Free	30 August 2024	
MF	(Belgium) Arthur Vermeeren	(Germany) RB Leipzig	Transfer	€20M	17 January 2025	
FW	(Portugal) Marcos Paulo	(Portugal) Boavista	Transfer	Free	25 January 2025	

Total expenditure: ▲€114 million (excluding potential add-ons, bonuses and undisclosed figures)

== Pre-season and friendlies ==
Win Draw Loss Fixtures

27 July 2024 Jesús Gil Trophy	Atlético Madrid	1–1 (5–3 p)	Numancia	Burgo de Osma
18:00 CEST (UTC+2)	Riquelme 30'; Azpilicueta (yellow card) 35'; Correa (yellow card) 37'; Mouriño (yellow card) 40'; Giménez (yellow card) 86'	Report	Ribeiro 32'	Stadium: Estadio Municipal; Attendance: 4,000; Referee: Néstor Holgueras Castellanos
	Penalties
	Niño (penalty scored); Martín (penalty scored); Serrano (penalty scored); Galán (penalty scored); Seidu (penalty scored)		(penalty scored) Dieste; (penalty scored) Elosegi; (penalty missed) Conte; (penalty scored) Seguín

3 August 2024 Friendly	Getafe	1–3	Atlético Madrid	Getafe
21:00 CEST (UTC+2)	Uche 60'; Rico (yellow card) 82'; Fernández (red card) 88'	Report	Correa 38', 55'; Witsel (yellow card) 39'; Félix 45'	Stadium: Coliseum; Referee: Isidro Díaz de Mera Escuderos

7 August 2024 BOC Life Cup	Kitchee	1–6	Atlético Madrid	Hong Kong
20:00 HKT (UTC+8)	Temirov 67'	Report	Sørloth 7', 8'; Martín 53'; Mouriño 63'; Niño 71'; Lemar 87'	Stadium: Hong Kong Stadium; Referee: Fong-Hei Lau (Hong Kong)

11 August 2024 Friendly	Atlético Madrid	2–0	Juventus	Gothenburg, Sweden
15:00 CEST (UTC+2)	Lino (yellow card) 43'; Félix 48'; Serrano (yellow card) 68'; Correa 85' (pen.)	Report		Stadium: Ullevi; Attendance: 13,767; Referee: Mohammed Al-Hakim (Sweden)

== Competitions ==
=== Overall record ===
Competition	First match	Last match	Starting round	Final position	Record							
Competition	First match	Last match	Starting round	Final position	Pld	W	D	L	GF	GA	GD	Win %
La Liga	19 August 2024	25 May 2025	Matchday 1	3rd	38	22	10	6	68	30	+38	57.89
Copa del Rey	31 October 2024	2 April 2025	First round	Semi-finals	7	5	1	1	19	6	+13	71.43
UEFA Champions League	19 September 2024	12 March 2025	League phase	Round of 16	10	7	0	3	22	14	+8	70.00
FIFA Club World Cup	15 June 2025	23 June 2025	Group stage	Group stage	3	2	0	1	4	5	−1	66.67
Total					58	36	11	11	113	55	+58	62.07

Source: Soccerway

=== La Liga ===
==== League table ====
Pos	Team	Pld	W	D	L	GF	GA	GD	Pts	Qualification or relegation
1	Barcelona (C)	38	28	4	6	102	39	+63	88	Qualification for the Champions League league stage (Note: La Liga gained an additional Champions League place as a result of Spain gaining one of the two European Performance Spots (EPS) awarded to the two associations with the highest UEFA coefficient points in 2024–25.)
2	Real Madrid	38	26	6	6	78	38	+40	84	Qualification for the Champions League league stage
3	Atlético Madrid	38	22	10	6	68	30	+38	76	Qualification for the Champions League league stage
4	Athletic Bilbao	38	19	13	6	54	29	+25	70 (Note: Athletic Bilbao finished ahead of Villarreal on head-to-head points: Athletic Bilbao 2–0 Villarreal, Villarreal 0–0 Athletic Bilbao.)	Qualification for the Champions League league stage
5	Villarreal	38	20	10	8	71	51	+20	70	Qualification for the Champions League league stage

Source: LaLiga EA Sports
Rules for classification: 1) Points; 2) Head-to-head points; 3) Head-to-head goal difference; 4) Goal difference; 5) Goals scored; 6) Fair-play points
(Note: Head-to-head record is used only after all the matches between the teams in question have been played)
(C) Champions

==== Results summary ====
Overall								Home						Away					
Pld	W	D	L	GF	GA	GD	Pts	W	D	L	GF	GA	GD	W	D	L	GF	GA	GD
38	22	10	6	68	30	+38	76	14	4	1	42	15	+27	8	6	5	26	15	+11

Source: La Liga

==== Results by round ====
Round	1	2	3	4	5	6	7	8	9	10	11	12	13	14	15	16	17	18	19	20	21	22	23	24	25	26	27	28	29	30	31	32	33	34	35	36	37	38
Ground	A	H	H	A	H	A	A	H	A	H	A	H	A	H	A	H	H	A	H	A	H	H	A	H	A	H	A	H	A	A	H	A	H	A	H	A	H	A
Result	D	W	D	W	W	D	W	D	D	W	L	W	W	W	W	W	W	W	W	L	D	W	D	D	W	W	L	L	D	W	W	L	W	D	W	L	W	W
Position	5	4	5	3	2	4	3	4	3	3	4	3	3	3	3	3	2	1	1	2	2	2	2	3	3	2	3	3	3	3	3	3	3	3	3	3	3	3

Source: La Liga
A = Away; H = Home; W = Win; D = Draw; L = Loss

==== Matches ====
The match schedule was released on 18 June 2024.

19 August 2024 1	Villarreal	2–2	Atlético Madrid	Villarreal
21:30 CEST (UTC+2)	Pino (yellow card) 10'; Danjuma 18'; Koke 37' (o.g.)	Report	Llorente 20'; Le Normand (yellow card) 40'; Barrios (yellow card) 43'; Sørloth 45+5'; Lino (yellow card) 81'	Stadium: Estadio de la Cerámica; Attendance: 21,566; Referee: Guillermo Cuadra Fernández

25 August 2024 2	Atlético Madrid	3–0	Girona	Madrid
21:30 CEST (UTC+2)	De Paul (yellow card) 25'; Griezmann 39'; Llorente 48'; Koke 90+4'	Report	Ruiz (yellow card) 28'; Gazzaniga (yellow card) 37'; Romeu (yellow card) 55'	Stadium: Cívitas Metropolitano; Attendance: 60,414; Referee: Juan Martínez Munuera

28 August 2024 3	Atlético Madrid	0–0	Espanyol	Madrid
21:30 CEST (UTC+2)		Report	Puado (yellow card) 55'; El Hilali (yellow card) 82'	Stadium: Cívitas Metropolitano; Attendance: 56,669; Referee: Ricardo De Burgos Bengoetxea

31 August 2024 4	Athletic Bilbao	0–1	Atlético Madrid	Bilbao
19:00 CEST (UTC+2)	N. Williams (yellow card) 15'; Yeray (yellow card) 34'; Sancet (yellow card) 35'	Report	Koke (yellow card) 85'; Correa 90+2'	Stadium: San Mamés; Attendance: 48,617; Referee: Alejandro Hernández Hernández

15 September 2024 5	Atlético Madrid	3–0	Valencia	Madrid
21:00 CEST (UTC+2)	Koke (yellow card) 25'; Gallagher 39'; Griezmann 54'; Alvarez 90+4'	Report	Tárrega (yellow card) 10'; Guillamón (yellow card) 32'	Stadium: Cívitas Metropolitano; Attendance: 61,752; Referee: César Soto Grado

22 September 2024 6	Rayo Vallecano	1–1	Atlético Madrid	Madrid
21:00 CEST (UTC+2)	Palazón 35'	Report	Gallagher 49'	Stadium: Vallecas; Attendance: 13,646; Referee: Mario Melero López

26 September 2024 7	Celta Vigo	0–1	Atlético Madrid	Vigo
21:00 CEST (UTC+2)	Starfelt (yellow card) 33'; Rodríguez (yellow card) 90+2'	Report	Mandava (yellow card) 38'; Giménez (yellow card) 76'; Alvarez 90'	Stadium: Balaídos; Attendance: 21,533; Referee: Víctor García Verdura

29 September 2024 8	Atlético Madrid	1–1	Real Madrid	Madrid
21:00 CEST (UTC+2)	Le Normand (yellow card) 63'; Gallagher (yellow card) 70'; Alvarez (yellow card) 75'; Correa 90+5'; Llorente (red card) 90+9'	Report	Modrić (yellow card) 40'; Militão 64'	Stadium: Cívitas Metropolitano; Attendance: 70,112; Referee: Mateo Busquets Ferrer
Note: The match was temporarily suspended in the 69th minute after Atlético Madrid supporters threw objects onto the pitch.

6 October 2024 9	Real Sociedad	1–1	Atlético Madrid	San Sebastián
21:00 CEST (UTC+2)	Sučić 84'	Report	Alvarez 1'; Lenglet (yellow card) 55'; Galán (yellow card) 80'	Stadium: Anoeta; Attendance: 31,983; Referee: Isidro Díaz de Mera Escuderos

20 October 2024 10	Atlético Madrid	3–1	Leganés	Madrid
16:15 CEST (UTC+2)	Lenglet (yellow card) 30'; Sørloth 69', 90+9'; Galán (yellow card) 73'; Griezmann 81', (yellow card) 89'; Simeone (yellow card) 90+2'; De Paul (yellow card) 90+8'	Report	Neyou 34'; Cissé (yellow card) 80'	Stadium: Riyadh Air Metropolitano; Attendance: 60,122; Referee: José Luis Munuera Montero

27 October 2024 11	Real Betis	1–0	Atlético Madrid	Seville
18:30 CET (UTC+1)	Giménez 4' (o.g.); Perraud (yellow card) 75'; Ruibal (yellow card) 83'; Adrián (yellow card) 88'	Report	Mandava (yellow card) 7'; Koke (yellow card) 66'	Stadium: Benito Villamarín; Attendance: 52,621; Referee: Jesús Gil Manzano

3 November 2024 12	Atlético Madrid	2–0	Las Palmas	Madrid
14:00 CET (UTC+1)	Simeone 37'; Lenglet (yellow card) 73'; Sørloth 83'	Report	Viti (yellow card) 88'	Stadium: Riyadh Air Metropolitano; Attendance: 56,610; Referee: Ricardo De Burgos Bengoetxea

10 November 2024 13	Mallorca	0–1	Atlético Madrid	Palma
16:45 CET (UTC+1)	Costa (yellow card) 57'	Report	Lenglet (yellow card) 10'; Alvarez 61'; Mandava (yellow card) 83'; Correa (yellow card) 90+4'	Stadium: Estadi Mallorca Son Moix; Attendance: 19,500; Referee: José María Sánchez Martínez

23 November 2024 14	Atlético Madrid	2–1	Alavés	Madrid
16:15 CET (UTC+1)	Correa (yellow card) 45+3'; Griezmann 76' (pen.); Sørloth 86'; Alvarez (yellow card) 90'; De Paul (yellow card) 90+6'	Report	Guridi 7' (pen.); Blanco (yellow card) 58'; Sánchez (yellow card) 70'; Conechny (yellow card) 88'	Stadium: Riyadh Air Metropolitano; Attendance: 58,910; Referee: Víctor García Verdura

30 November 2024 15	Valladolid	0–5	Atlético Madrid	Valladolid
21:00 CET (UTC+1)	Pérez (yellow card) 32'	Report	Lenglet 26'; Alvarez 35'; De Paul 37'; Galán (yellow card) 41'; Griezmann 52'; Simeone (yellow card) 75'; Sørloth 90+2'	Stadium: José Zorrilla; Attendance: 23,482; Referee: Guillermo Cuadra Fernández

8 December 2024 16	Atlético Madrid	4–3	Sevilla	Madrid
21:00 CET (UTC+1)	De Paul 10'; Barrios (yellow card) 48'; Griezmann 62', 90+4', (yellow card) 90+5'; Alvarez (yellow card) 72'; Lino 79'; Galán (yellow card) 87'	Report	Lukebakio 12'; Romero 32'; Agoumé (yellow card) 49'; Juanlu 57'; Fernández (yellow card) 67'; Saúl (yellow card) 76'	Stadium: Riyadh Air Metropolitano; Attendance: 60,065; Referee: Javier Alberola Rojas

15 December 2024 17	Atlético Madrid	1–0	Getafe	Madrid
14:00 CET (UTC+1)	Sørloth 69'; Correa (yellow card) 72'; De Paul (yellow card) 90'; Koke (yellow card) 90+2'	Report	Iglesias (yellow card) 69'	Stadium: Riyadh Air Metropolitano; Attendance: 60,169; Referee: César Soto Grado

21 December 2024 18	Barcelona	1–2	Atlético Madrid	Barcelona
21:00 CET (UTC+1)	Pedri 30'	Report	Witsel (yellow card) 54'; De Paul 60'; Le Normand (yellow card) 77'; Sørloth 90+6'; Giménez (yellow card) 90+6'	Stadium: Estadi Olímpic Lluís Companys; Attendance: 46,249; Referee: Ricardo de Burgos Bengoetxea

12 January 2025 19	Atlético Madrid	1–0	Osasuna	Madrid
16:15 CET (UTC+1)	Simeone (yellow card) 34'; Lino (yellow card) 53'; Alvarez 55'	Report		Stadium: Riyadh Air Metropolitano; Attendance: 64,801; Referee: Isidro Díaz de Mera Escuderos

18 January 2025 20	Leganés	1–0	Atlético Madrid	Leganés
16:15 CET (UTC+1)	Nastasić 49'; Neyou (yellow card) 90'	Report	Barrios (yellow card) 43'; Galán (yellow card) 57'; Lenglet (yellow card) 70'; Griezmann (penalty missed) 90'	Stadium: Butarque; Attendance: 12,371; Referee: Mario Melero López

25 January 2025 21	Atlético Madrid	1–1	Villarreal	Madrid
16:15 CET (UTC+1)	Giménez (yellow card) 34'; De Paul (yellow card) 52'; Lino 58'; Le Normand (yellow card) 62'; Alvarez (yellow card) 63'	Report	Pino (yellow card) 22'; Gerard 29' (pen.); Femenía (yellow card) 76'	Stadium: Riyadh Air Metropolitano; Attendance: 63,596; Referee: José María Sánchez Martínez

1 February 2025 22	Atlético Madrid	2–0	Mallorca	Madrid
18:30 CET (UTC+1)	Lino 26'; Le Normand (yellow card) 70'; Gallagher (yellow card) 82'; Griezmann 90+3'	Report	Valjent (yellow card) 65'; Navarro (yellow card) 72'; Copete (yellow card) 85'	Stadium: Riyadh Air Metropolitano; Attendance: 60,710; Referee: Víctor García Verdura

8 February 2025 23	Real Madrid	1–1	Atlético Madrid	Madrid
21:00 CET (UTC+1)	Ceballos (yellow card) 25'; Mbappé 50'	Report	Alvarez 35' (pen.); Lenglet (yellow card) 45+4'; Galán (yellow card) 49'; Sørloth (yellow card) 90+2'	Stadium: Santiago Bernabéu; Attendance: 78,082; Referee: César Soto Grado

15 February 2025 24	Atlético Madrid	1–1	Celta Vigo	Madrid
18:30 CET (UTC+1)	Barrios (red card) 7'; De Paul (yellow card) 65'; Le Normand (yellow card) 67'; Giménez (yellow card) 67'; Sørloth 81'	Report	Domínguez (yellow card) 31'; Durán (yellow card) 47'; Aspas 68' (pen.); Alonso (yellow card) 72'; Losada (yellow card) 80'; Iglesias (yellow card) 90+3'	Stadium: Riyadh Air Metropolitano; Attendance: 64,211; Referee: Juan Martínez Munuera

22 February 2025 25	Valencia	0–3	Atlético Madrid	Valencia
18:30 CET (UTC+1)	Guerra (yellow card) 42'	Report	Alvarez 12', 30'; Correa 86'; Lino (yellow card) 23'; Lenglet (yellow card) 40'; Galán (yellow card) 64'	Stadium: Mestalla; Attendance: 46,297; Referee: Mateo Busquets Ferrer

1 March 2025 26	Atlético Madrid	1–0	Athletic Bilbao	Madrid
21:00 CET (UTC+1)	Sørloth (yellow card) 57'; Alvarez 66'; Barrios (yellow card) 68'	Report	Ruiz de Galarreta (yellow card) 32'; Gorosabel (yellow card) 62'; Yeray (yellow card) 87'	Stadium: Riyadh Air Metropolitano; Attendance: 63,810; Referee: Jesús Gil Manzano

9 March 2025 27	Getafe	2–1	Atlético Madrid	Getafe
14:00 CET (UTC+1)	Duarte (yellow card) 40'; Alderete (yellow card) 40'; Rodríguez (yellow card) 57'; Rico (yellow card) 74'; Djené (yellow card) 74'; Arambarri 88', 90+2'; Juanmi (yellow card) 90+11'	Report	Le Normand (yellow card) 40'; Sørloth 75' (pen.), (yellow card) 90+8'; Correa (red card) 88'	Stadium: Coliseum; Attendance: 12,862; Referee: Guillermo Cuadra Fernández

16 March 2025 28	Atlético Madrid	2–4	Barcelona	Madrid
21:00 CET (UTC+1)	Mandava (yellow card) 36'; Alvarez 45'; Sørloth 70'	Report	Koundé (yellow card) 26'; Balde (yellow card) 64'; Lewandowski 72'; Torres 78', 90+8'; Yamal 90+2', (yellow card) 90+3'	Stadium: Riyadh Air Metropolitano; Attendance: 67,602; Referee: Ricardo de Burgos Bengoetxea

29 March 2025 29	Espanyol	1–1	Atlético Madrid	Cornellà de Llobregat
16:15 CET (UTC+1)	Kumbulla (yellow card) 21'; Puado 71' (pen.); Véliz (yellow card) 73'	Report	Azpilicueta 38'; Giménez (yellow card) 90+1'	Stadium: RCDE Stadium; Attendance: 30,559; Referee: Javier Alberola Rojas

6 April 2025 30	Sevilla	1–2	Atlético Madrid	Seville
16:15 CEST (UTC+2)	Agoumé 7'; Salas (yellow card) 90+6'	Report	Alvarez 25' (pen.); Simeone (yellow card) 51'; Lenglet (yellow card) 57'; Le Normand (yellow card) 85'; Barrios 90+3'; Sørloth (yellow card) 90+6'	Stadium: Ramón Sánchez Pizjuán; Attendance: 34,505; Referee: César Soto Grado

14 April 2025 31	Atlético Madrid	4–2	Valladolid	Madrid
21:00 CEST (UTC+2)	Alvarez 25' (pen.), 71' (pen.); Simeone 27'; Lenglet (yellow card) 55'; Sørloth 79'	Report	Sylla 21'; Sánchez 56'; Anuar (yellow card) 63'	Stadium: Riyadh Air Metropolitano; Attendance: 55,936; Referee: Isidro Díaz de Mera Escuderos

19 April 2025 32	Las Palmas	1–0	Atlético Madrid	Las Palmas
20:00 WEST (UTC+1)	J. Muñoz (yellow card) 71', (goal) 90+3'; Essugo (yellow card) 77'; Mata (yellow card) 90+4'	Report	Galán (yellow card) 54'	Stadium: Gran Canaria; Attendance: 27,154; Referee: Víctor García Verdura

24 April 2025 33	Atlético Madrid	3–0	Rayo Vallecano	Madrid
17:00 CEST (UTC+2)	Sørloth 3'; Gallagher 45'; Alvarez 77'	Report	Rațiu (yellow card) 66'; Batalla (yellow card) 79'	Stadium: Riyadh Air Metropolitano; Attendance: 49,410; Referee: Pablo González Fuertes

3 May 2025 34	Alavés	0–0	Atlético Madrid	Vitoria-Gasteiz
14:00 CEST (UTC+2)	Guevara (yellow card) 28'; Mouriño (yellow card) 56'; Blanco (yellow card) 63'	Report	Azpilicueta (yellow card) 41'; Alvarez (yellow card) 42'	Stadium: Mendizorrotza; Attendance: 18,117; Referee: Juan Martínez Munuera

10 May 2025 35	Atlético Madrid	4–0	Real Sociedad	Madrid
21:00 CEST (UTC+2)	Sørloth 7', 10', 11', 30'	Report	Barrenetxea (yellow card) 54'	Stadium: Riyadh Air Metropolitano; Attendance: 59,612; Referee: José María Sánchez Martínez

15 May 2025 36	Osasuna	2–0	Atlético Madrid	Pamplona
19:00 CEST (UTC+2)	Catena 25'; Ibáñez (yellow card) 40'; Budimir 82'	Report	De Paul (yellow card) 26'	Stadium: El Sadar; Attendance: 21,171; Referee: Mario Melero López

18 May 2025 37	Atlético Madrid	4–1	Real Betis	Madrid
19:00 CEST (UTC+2)	Alvarez 10', 75'; Le Normand 45+3'; Molina (yellow card) 90+3'; Correa 90+6'	Report	Fornals 67'; Mendy (yellow card) 89'	Stadium: Riyadh Air Metropolitano; Attendance: 62,269; Referee: Adrián Cordero Vega

25 May 2025 38	Girona	0–4	Atlético Madrid	Girona
14:00 CEST (UTC+2)		Report	Sørloth 68', 90', 90+3'; Lenglet 87'	Stadium: Montilivi; Attendance: 11,546; Referee: Jesús Gil Manzano

=== Copa del Rey ===
31 October 2024 First round	Vic	0–2	Atlético Madrid	Vic
19:00 CET (UTC+1)	Maciá (yellow card) 48'; Senyé (yellow card) 74' (yellow-red card) 80'; Busquets (yellow card) 85'	Report	Alvarez 81' (pen.), 89'	Stadium: Hipòlit Planàs; Attendance: 6,300; Referee: Guillermo Cuadra Fernández

5 December 2024 Second round	Cacereño	1–3	Atlético Madrid	Cáceres
19:00 CET (UTC+1)	Merencio 30'; Nieves (yellow card) 80'; Sancho (yellow card) 82' (yellow-red card) 85'	Report	Le Normand (yellow card) 40'; Azpilicueta (yellow card) 45+3'; Lenglet 83'; Pérez 90+2' (o.g.); Alvarez 90+6'	Stadium: Príncipe Felipe; Attendance: 9,384; Referee: Isidro Díaz de Mera Escuderos

4 January 2025 Round of 32	Marbella	0–1	Atlético Madrid	Málaga
21:30 CET (UTC+1)	Olguín (yellow card) 85'	Report	Griezmann 16'; Lenglet (yellow card) 62'; Galán (yellow card) 73'; Koke (yellow card) 90'	Stadium: La Rosaleda; Attendance: 30,044; Referee: Alejandro Muñiz Ruiz

15 January 2025 Round of 16	Elche	0–4	Atlético Madrid	Elche
21:30 CET (UTC+1)	A. Álvarez (yellow card) 7'; Fernández (yellow card) 32' (yellow-red card) 50'; Nwankwo (yellow card) 34'	Report	Sørloth 8', 29' (pen.); Riquelme 61'; Le Normand (yellow card) 69'; Alvarez 75'	Stadium: Martínez Valero; Attendance: 26,405; Referee: Guillermo Cuadra Fernández

4 February 2025 Quarter-finals	Atlético Madrid	5–0	Getafe	Madrid
21:30 CET (UTC+1)	Simeone 8', 17'; Lino 42'; Gallagher (yellow card) 70'; Correa 78'; Sørloth 86'	Report	Uche (yellow card) 8'; Bekhoucha (yellow card) 77'	Stadium: Riyadh Air Metropolitano; Attendance: 60,000; Referee: Guillermo Cuadra Fernández

25 February 2025 Semi-finals; First leg	Barcelona	4–4	Atlético Madrid	Barcelona
21:30 CET (UTC+1)	Pedri 19'; Cubarsí 21'; Martínez 41'; Lewandowski 74'	Report	Alvarez 1'; Griezmann 6'; Galán (yellow card) 16'; Giménez (yellow card) 82'; Llorente 84'; Barrios (yellow card) 88'; Sørloth (yellow card) 90+1', (goal) 90+3'	Stadium: Estadi Olímpic Lluís Companys; Attendance: 40,915; Referee: Alejandro Hernández Hernández

2 April 2025 Semi-finals; Second leg	Atlético Madrid	0–1 (4–5 agg.)	Barcelona	Madrid
21:30 CEST (UTC+2)	Azpilicueta (yellow card) 6'; De Paul (yellow card) 13'; Mandava (yellow card) 31'; Alvarez (yellow card) 45+3'; Molina (yellow card) 59'	Report	Torres 27'; De Jong (yellow card) 35'; Balde (yellow card) 68'; Martín (yellow card) 90+3'	Stadium: Riyadh Air Metropolitano; Attendance: 69,014; Referee: José Luis Munuera Montero

=== UEFA Champions League ===
==== League phase ====
The draw for the league phase was held on 29 August 2024.

Pos	Team	Pld	W	D	L	GF	GA	GD	Pts	Qualification
3	(The Football Association) Arsenal	8	6	1	1	16	3	+13	19	Advance to round of 16 (seeded)
4	(Italian Football Federation) Inter Milan	8	6	1	1	11	1	+10	19	Advance to round of 16 (seeded)
5	(Royal Spanish Football Federation) Atlético Madrid	8	6	0	2	20	12	+8	18	Advance to round of 16 (seeded)
6	(German Football Association) Bayer Leverkusen	8	5	1	2	15	7	+8	16	Advance to round of 16 (seeded)
7	(French Football Federation) Lille	8	5	1	2	17	10	+7	16	Advance to round of 16 (seeded)

Source: UEFA
Rules for classification: League phase tiebreakers

Round	1	2	3	4	5	6	7	8
Ground	H	A	H	A	A	H	H	A
Result	W	L	L	W	W	W	W	W
Position	12	23	27	23	15	11	5	5

Source: UEFA
A = Away; H = Home; W = Win; D = Draw; L = Loss

19 September 2024 1	Atlético Madrid (Spain)	2–1	(Germany) RB Leipzig	Madrid, Spain
21:00 CEST (UTC+2)	Le Normand (yellow card) 10'; Griezmann 28'; De Paul (yellow card) 60'; Giménez (yellow card) 60', (goal) 90'	Report	Šeško 4'; Lukeba (yellow card) 39'; Baumgartner (yellow card) 49'; Henrichs (yellow card) 64'; Openda (yellow card) 90+4'	Stadium: Cívitas Metropolitano; Attendance: 57,856; Referee: Ivan Kružliak (Slovakia)

2 October 2024 2	Benfica (Portugal)	4–0	(Spain) Atlético Madrid	Lisbon, Portugal
20:00 WEST (UTC+1)	Aktürkoğlu 13'; Aursnes (yellow card) 22'; Di María 52' (pen.); Bah 75'; Kökçü 84' (pen.)	Report	Serrano (yellow card) 70'; Giménez (yellow card) 83'; Mandava (yellow card) 84'; Correa (yellow card) 90+5'	Stadium: Estádio da Luz; Attendance: 62,028; Referee: Serdar Gözübüyük (Netherlands)

23 October 2024 3	Atlético Madrid (Spain)	1–3	(France) Lille	Madrid, Spain
21:00 CEST (UTC+2)	Alvarez 8'; Galán (yellow card) 17'; Giménez (yellow card) 78'; Witsel (yellow card) 88'	Report	Touré (yellow card) 44'; Zhegrova 61'; David 74' (pen.), 89'; Meunier (yellow card) 78'	Stadium: Riyadh Air Metropolitano; Attendance: 61,197; Referee: Marco Guida (Italy)

6 November 2024 4	Paris Saint-Germain (France)	1–2	(Spain) Atlético Madrid	Paris, France
21:00 CET (UTC+1)	Zaïre-Emery 14'	Report	Molina 18'; Correa (yellow card) 87', (goal) 90+3'	Stadium: Parc des Princes; Attendance: 47,369; Referee: Szymon Marciniak (Poland)

26 November 2024 5	Sparta Prague (Czech Republic)	0–6	(Spain) Atlético Madrid	Prague, Czech Republic
18:45 CET (UTC+1)	Pešek (yellow card) 65'	Report	Alvarez 15', 59'; Llorente 43'; Barrios (yellow card) 67'; Griezmann 70'; Correa 85', 89'	Stadium: Stadion Letná; Attendance: 18,110; Referee: Danny Makkelie (Netherlands)

11 December 2024 6	Atlético Madrid (Spain)	3–1	(Slovakia) Slovan Bratislava	Madrid, Spain
18:45 CET (UTC+1)	Alvarez 16'; Griezmann 42', 57'	Report	Strelec 51' (pen.)	Stadium: Riyadh Air Metropolitano; Attendance: 59,134; Referee: Manfredas Lukjančukas (Lithuania)

21 January 2025 7	Atlético Madrid (Spain)	2–1	(Germany) Bayer Leverkusen	Madrid, Spain
21:00 CET (UTC+1)	Barrios (red card) 23'; Giménez (yellow card) 45+2'; Alvarez 52', 90'; Simeone (yellow card) 66'	Report	Wirtz (yellow card) 44'; Hincapié 45+1', (yellow card) 45+4' (yellow-red card) 76'; Tella (yellow card) 45+2'	Stadium: Riyadh Air Metropolitano; Attendance: 66,820; Referee: Davide Massa (Italy)

29 January 2025 8	Red Bull Salzburg (Austria)	1–4	(Spain) Atlético Madrid	Salzburg, Austria
21:00 CET (UTC+1)	Capaldo (yellow card) 58'; Blank (yellow card) 66'; Daghim 90+1'	Report	Simeone 5'; Griezmann 13', 45+1'; Llorente 63'	Stadium: Red Bull Arena; Attendance: 23,389; Referee: Anthony Taylor (England)

==== Knockout phase ====
===== Round of 16 =====
The draw for the round of 16 was held on 21 February 2025.

4 March 2025 First leg	Real Madrid (Spain)	2–1	(Spain) Atlético Madrid	Madrid, Spain
21:00 CET (UTC+1)	Rodrygo 4'; Brahim 55', (yellow card) 56'	Report	Alvarez 32'	Stadium: Santiago Bernabéu; Attendance: 77,261; Referee: Clément Turpin (France)

12 March 2025 Second leg	Atlético Madrid (Spain)	1–0 (a.e.t.) (2–2 agg.) (2–4 p)	(Spain) Real Madrid	Madrid, Spain
21:00 CET (UTC+1)	Gallagher 1'; Simeone (yellow card) 66'; Lenglet (yellow card) 68'; Azpilicueta (yellow card) 114'; Llorente (yellow card) 115'	Report	Tchouaméni (yellow card) 39'; Vinícius (yellow card) 59', (penalty missed) 70'; Vázquez (yellow card) 115'; Mbappé (yellow card) PSO	Stadium: Riyadh Air Metropolitano; Attendance: 69,304; Referee: Szymon Marciniak (Poland)
	Penalties
	Sørloth (penalty scored); Alvarez (penalty missed); Correa (penalty scored); Llorente (penalty missed)		(penalty scored) Mbappé; (penalty scored) Bellingham; (penalty scored) Valverde; (penalty missed) Vázquez; (penalty scored) Rüdiger

=== FIFA Club World Cup ===
==== Group stage ====
The draw for the group stage was held on 5 December 2024.

Pos	Team	Pld	W	D	L	GF	GA	GD	Pts	Qualification
1	(France) Paris Saint-Germain	3	2	0	1	6	1	+5	6 (Note: Tied on head-to-head points (3). Head-to-head goal difference: Paris Saint-Germain +3, Botafogo 0, Atlético Madrid –3.)	Advance to knockout stage
2	(Brazil) Botafogo	3	2	0	1	3	2	+1	6	Advance to knockout stage
3	(Spain) Atlético Madrid	3	2	0	1	4	5	−1	6	
4	(United States) Seattle Sounders FC	3	0	0	3	2	7	−5	0	

Source: FIFA
Rules for classification: Group stage tiebreakers
Notes:

15 June 2025 1	Paris Saint-Germain (France)	4–0	(Spain) Atlético Madrid	Pasadena, United States
12:00 PDT (UTC−7)	Fabián 19', (yellow card) 28'; Vitinha 45+1'; Marquinhos (yellow card) 62'; Mayulu 87'; Lee 90+7' (pen.)	Report	Lenglet (yellow card) 20' (yellow-red card) 78'; Le Normand (yellow card) 25'; Simeone (yellow card) 29'; Koke (yellow card) 48'; Correa (yellow card) 63'; Mandava (yellow card) 64'	Stadium: Rose Bowl; Attendance: 80,619; Referee: István Kovács (Romania)

19 June 2025 2	Seattle Sounders FC (United States)	1–3	(Spain) Atlético Madrid	Seattle, United States
15:00 PDT (UTC−7)	Rusnák 50'; Rothrock (yellow card) 63'	Report	Barrios 11', 55'; De Paul (yellow card) 42'; Witsel 47'; Gallagher (yellow card) 77'	Stadium: Lumen Field; Attendance: 51,636; Referee: Yael Falcón (Argentina)

23 June 2025 3	Atlético Madrid (Spain)	1–0	(Brazil) Botafogo	Pasadena, United States
12:00 PDT (UTC−7)	Griezmann 87'	Report	Gregore (yellow card) 90+5'	Stadium: Rose Bowl; Attendance: 22,992; Referee: César Ramos (Mexico)

== Statistics ==
=== Squad statistics ===
No.	Pos	Nat	Player	Total		La Liga		Copa del Rey		Champions League		Club World Cup	
No.	Pos	Nat	Player	Apps	Goals	Apps	Goals	Apps	Goals	Apps	Goals	Apps	Goals
Goalkeepers
1	GK	(Argentina) ARG	Juan Musso	9	0	2	0	7	0	0	0	0	0
13	GK	(Slovenia) SLO	Jan Oblak	49	0	36	0	0	0	10	0	3	0
31	GK	(Spain) ESP	Antonio Gomis	0	0	0	0	0	0	0	0	0	0
Defenders
2	DF	(Uruguay) URU	José Giménez	39	1	20+7	0	3	0	8	1	1	0
3	DF	(Spain) ESP	César Azpilicueta	20	1	10+4	1	3+1	0	1+1	0	0	0
15	DF	(France) FRA	Clément Lenglet	36	3	23	2	2+2	1	7	0	2	0
16	DF	(Argentina) ARG	Nahuel Molina	46	1	17+13	0	3+3	0	3+5	1	0+2	0
20	DF	(Belgium) BEL	Axel Witsel	22	1	9+5	0	3	0	3+1	0	0+1	1
21	DF	(Spain) ESP	Javi Galán	40	0	21+4	0	4+2	0	6	0	3	0
23	DF	(Mozambique) MOZ	Reinildo Mandava	30	0	10+9	0	2+2	0	3+3	0	0+1	0
24	DF	(Spain) ESP	Robin Le Normand	40	1	24+3	1	5	0	2+3	0	3	0
27	DF	(Greece) GRE	Ilias Kostis	1	0	0	0	1	0	0	0	0	0
Midfielders
4	MF	(England) ENG	Conor Gallagher	51	4	19+13	3	4+2	0	4+5	1	2+2	0
5	MF	(Argentina) ARG	Rodrigo De Paul	53	3	23+11	3	5+1	0	10	0	3	0
6	MF	(Spain) ESP	Koke	47	1	20+12	1	3+2	0	4+3	0	1+2	0
8	MF	(Spain) ESP	Pablo Barrios	44	3	28+3	1	3+1	0	6	0	3	2
11	MF	(France) FRA	Thomas Lemar	8	0	0+5	0	0+2	0	0+1	0	0	0
12	MF	(Brazil) BRA	Samuel Lino	47	4	21+10	3	3+1	1	3+7	0	1+1	0
14	MF	(Spain) ESP	Marcos Llorente	49	5	28+5	2	3+2	1	8	2	3	0
17	MF	(Spain) ESP	Rodrigo Riquelme	26	1	4+12	0	3+2	1	1+4	0	0	0
29	MF	(Spain) ESP	Javi Serrano	2	0	0	0	1	0	0+1	0	0	0
Forwards
7	FW	(France) FRA	Antoine Griezmann	56	17	29+9	8	4+1	2	9+1	6	1+2	1
9	FW	(Norway) NOR	Alexander Sørloth	53	24	15+20	20	3+4	4	2+6	0	2+1	0
10	FW	(Argentina) ARG	Ángel Correa	48	8	3+28	4	3+3	1	2+6	3	0+3	0
19	FW	(Argentina) ARG	Julián Alvarez	57	29	30+7	17	4+3	5	10	7	3	0
22	FW	(Argentina) ARG	Giuliano Simeone	50	5	26+7	2	5	2	7+2	1	3	0
32	FW	(Spain) ESP	Adrián Niño	1	0	0+1	0	0	0	0	0	0	0

Source: Competitions

=== Goalscorers ===
Rank	No.	Pos.	Nat.	Player	La Liga	Copa del Rey	Champions League	Club World Cup	Total
1	19	FW	(Argentina)	Julián Alvarez	17	5	7	0	29
2	9	FW	(Norway)	Alexander Sørloth	20	4	0	0	24
3	7	FW	(France)	Antoine Griezmann	8	2	6	1	17
4	10	FW	(Argentina)	Ángel Correa	4	1	3	0	8
5	14	MF	(Spain)	Marcos Llorente	2	1	2	0	5
5	22	FW	(Argentina)	Giuliano Simeone	2	2	1	0	5
7	4	MF	(England)	Conor Gallagher	3	0	1	0	4
7	12	MF	(Brazil)	Samuel Lino	3	1	0	0	4
9	5	MF	(Argentina)	Rodrigo De Paul	3	0	0	0	3
9	8	MF	(Spain)	Pablo Barrios	1	0	0	2	3
9	15	DF	(France)	Clément Lenglet	2	1	0	0	3
11	2	DF	(Uruguay)	José Giménez	0	0	1	0	1
11	3	DF	(Spain)	César Azpilicueta	1	0	0	0	1
11	6	MF	(Spain)	Koke	1	0	0	0	1
11	16	DF	(Argentina)	Nahuel Molina	0	0	1	0	1
11	17	MF	(Spain)	Rodrigo Riquelme	0	1	0	0	1
11	20	DF	(Belgium)	Axel Witsel	0	0	0	1	1
11	24	DF	(Spain)	Robin Le Normand	1	0	0	0	1
Own goals					0	1	0	0	1
Totals					68	19	22	4	113
