= Alejandro Iturbe =

Spanish footballer (born 2003)

Personal information
- Full name: Alejandro Iturbe Encabo
- Date of birth: 2 September 2003 (age 23)
- Place of birth: Madrid, Spain
- Height: 1.86 m (6 ft 1 in)
- Position: Goalkeeper

Team information
- Current team: Elche
- Number: 45

Youth career
- 2008–2022: Atlético Madrid

Senior career*
Years	Team	Apps	(Gls)
2022–2025	Atlético Madrid B	83	(0)
2025–	Elche	0	(0)

International career^{‡}
2019	Spain U17	3	(0)
2021	Spain U19	6	(0)
2023–	Spain U21	12	(0)
2024–	Spain U23	1	(0)
Medal record
Men's football
Representing Spain
Olympic Games
Gold medal – first place	2024 Paris	Team
- * Club domestic league appearances and goals as of 10 June 2025 ‡ National team caps and goals as of 23:56, 21 June 2025 (UTC)

Alejandro Iturbe Encabo (born 2 September 2003) is a Spanish professional footballer who plays as a goalkeeper for La Liga club Elche CF.

== Club career ==
=== Atlético Madrid ===
Born in Madrid, Iturbe joined Atlético Madrid's youth sides in 2008, aged five. He trained with the first team at the age of 14, and renewed his contract for three years on 18 July 2022, being promoted to the reserves in Segunda Federación.

Iturbe made his senior debut on 18 September 2022, starting in a 2–2 away draw against CD Coria. He overtook Antonio Gomis as the first-choice for the B's during the season, helping the side to achieve promotion to Primera Federación.

On 10 July 2024, Iturbe further extended his link until 2027.

=== Elche ===
On 16 July 2025, Iturbe signed a four-year contract with La Liga side Elche CF.

== International career ==
Iturbe represented Spain at under-17, under-19 and under-21 levels before being called up with the under-23s for the 2024 Summer Olympics. He was a third-choice behind Arnau Tenas and Joan García, playing in one match during the tournament as they won gold medal.

== Personal life ==
Iturbe is a supporter of Atlético Madrid. His grandfather was also a footballer and a goalkeeper, and played for RSD Alcalá, CD Los Yébenes and Getafe CF in the 1980s.

== Honours ==
Spain U23

- Summer Olympics gold medal: 2024

== Career statistics ==
=== Club ===
As of match played 24 May 2025

Appearances and goals by club, season and competition
Club	Season	League			National Cup		Continental		Other		Total	
Club	Season	Division	Apps	Goals	Apps	Goals	Apps	Goals	Apps	Goals	Apps	Goals
Atlético Madrid B	2022–23	Segunda Federación	17	0	—		—		4	0	21	0
Atlético Madrid B	2023–24	Primera Federación	32	0	—		—		—		32	0
Atlético Madrid B	2024–25	Primera Federación	34	0	—		—		—		34	0
Atlético Madrid B	Total		83	0	—		—		4	0	87	0
Atlético Madrid	2022–23	La Liga	0	0	0	0	0	0	—		0	0
Atlético Madrid	2024–25	La Liga	0	0	0	0	0	0	—		0	0
Atlético Madrid	Total		0	0	0	0	0	0	—		0	0
Elche	2025–26	La Liga	0	0	0	0	—		—		0	0
Elche	2026–27	La Liga	0	0	0	0	—		—		0	0
Elche	Total		0	0	0	0	—		—		0	0
Career total			83	0	0	0	0	0	4	0	87	0
