= 2022–23 Atlético Madrid season =

116th season in existence of Atlético Madrid

Atlético Madrid
2022–23 season
- President: Enrique Cerezo
- Head coach: Diego Simeone
- Stadium: Cívitas Metropolitano
- La Liga: 3rd
- Copa del Rey: Quarter-finals
- UEFA Champions League: Group stage
- Top goalscorer: League: Antoine Griezmann (15); All: Antoine Griezmann (16)
- Biggest win: 6–1 vs Sevilla (H)
- Biggest defeat: 0–2 vs Villarreal (H) vs Bayer Leverkusen (A) vs Club Brugge (A); 1–3 vs Real Madrid (A)
Home colours	Away colours	Third colours

2023–24 away kit, used for club's 120th anniversary

The 2022–23 season was the 116th season in the history of Atlético Madrid and their 21st consecutive season in the top flight. The club participated in La Liga, the Copa del Rey, and the UEFA Champions League.

== Kits ==
Home	Home alt	Away	Third	120 Years
Goalkeeper 1	Goalkeeper 2

== Players ==
As of 1 February 2023.

Note: Flags indicate national team as defined under FIFA eligibility rules; some limited exceptions apply. Players may hold more than one non-FIFA nationality.

No.	Pos.	Nation	Player
1	GK	CRO	Ivo Grbić
2	DF	URU	José Giménez (3rd captain)
3	DF	ESP	Sergio Reguilón (on loan from Tottenham Hotspur)
4	MF	CAF	Geoffrey Kondogbia
5	MF	ARG	Rodrigo De Paul
6	MF	ESP	Koke (captain)
8	FW	FRA	Antoine Griezmann
9	FW	NED	Memphis Depay
10	FW	ARG	Ángel Correa
11	MF	FRA	Thomas Lemar
12	DF	IRL	Matt Doherty
13	GK	SLO	Jan Oblak (vice-captain)
14	MF	ESP	Marcos Llorente

No.	Pos.	Nation	Player
15	DF	MNE	Stefan Savić (4th captain)
16	DF	ARG	Nahuel Molina
17	MF	ESP	Saúl
19	FW	ESP	Álvaro Morata
20	MF	BEL	Axel Witsel
21	MF	BEL	Yannick Carrasco
22	DF	ESP	Mario Hermoso
23	DF	MOZ	Reinildo Mandava
24	MF	ESP	Pablo Barrios
31	GK	ESP	Antonio Gomis

=== Other players under contract ===
Note: Flags indicate national team as defined under FIFA eligibility rules; some limited exceptions apply. Players may hold more than one non-FIFA nationality.

No.	Pos.	Nation	Player
7	FW	POR	João Félix
9	FW	BRA	Matheus Cunha
12	DF	BRA	Renan Lodi
26	FW	POR	Marcos Paulo

=== Out on loan ===
Note: Flags indicate national team as defined under FIFA eligibility rules; some limited exceptions apply. Players may hold more than one non-FIFA nationality.

No.	Pos.	Nation	Player
—	DF	ESP	Diego Espejo (at Atlético Ottawa until 30 November 2023)
—	DF	ESP	Manu Sánchez (at Osasuna until 30 June 2023)
—	DF	ARG	Mariano Gómez (at Badajoz until 30 June 2023)
—	DF	BRA	Renan Lodi (at Nottingham Forest until 30 June 2023)
—	DF	ESP	Sergio Camus (at Atlético Ottawa until 30 June 2023)
—	MF	ESP	Javi Serrano (at Ibiza until 30 June 2023)
—	MF	URU	Juan Sanabria (at Atlético San Luis until 30 June 2023)
—	MF	ESP	Rodrigo Riquelme (at Girona until 30 June 2023)
—	MF	ESP	Vitolo (at Las Palmas until 30 June 2023)
—	FW	ESP	Borja Garcés (at Tenerife until 30 June 2023)

No.	Pos.	Nation	Player
—	FW	ESP	Cedric Teguia (at Córdoba until 30 June 2023)
—	FW	ESP	Germán Valera (at Andorra until 30 June 2023)
—	FW	ARG	Giuliano Simeone (at Zaragoza until 30 June 2023)
—	FW	BRA	Samuel Lino (at Valencia until 30 June 2023)
—	FW	ESP	Sergio Camello (at Rayo Vallecano until 30 June 2023)
—	FW	ESP	Víctor Mollejo (at Zaragoza until 30 June 2023)
—	FW	BRA	Matheus Cunha (at Wolverhampton Wanderers until 30 June 2023)
—	FW	BRA	Marcos Paulo (at São Paulo until 31 December 2023)
—	FW	POR	João Félix (at Chelsea until 30 June 2023)

== Transfers ==
=== In ===
Date	Player	From	Type	Fee	Ref.
1 July 2022	(Spain) Álvaro Morata	(Italy) Juventus	Loan return		
1 July 2022	(Croatia) Ivo Grbić	(France) Lille	Loan return		
1 July 2022	(Colombia) Santiago Arias	(Spain) Granada	Loan return		
1 July 2022	(Brazil) Marcos Paulo	(Portugal) Famalicão	Loan return		
6 July 2022	(Belgium) Axel Witsel	(Germany) Borussia Dortmund	Transfer	Free	
8 July 2022	(Spain) Saúl	(England) Chelsea	Loan return		
8 July 2022	(Brazil) Samuel Lino	(Portugal) Gil Vicente	Transfer	€6.5M	
28 July 2022	(Argentina) Nahuel Molina	(Italy) Udinese	Transfer	€10M	
30 August 2022	(Spain) Sergio Reguilón	(England) Tottenham Hotspur	Loan		
28 December 2022	(Brazil) Marcos Paulo	(Spain) Mirandés	Loan return		
20 January 2023	(Netherlands) Memphis Depay	(Spain) Barcelona	Transfer	€3M	
31 January 2023	(Republic of Ireland) Matt Doherty	(England) Tottenham Hotspur	Transfer	Free	

=== Out ===
Date	Player	To	Type	Fee	Ref.
30 June 2022	(France) Benjamin Lecomte	(France) Monaco	End of loan		
1 July 2022	(Uruguay) Luis Suárez	(Uruguay) Nacional	Released		
2 July 2022	(Croatia) Šime Vrsaljko	(Greece) Olympiacos	Released		
4 July 2022	(Argentina) Giuliano Simeone	(Spain) Zaragoza	Loan		
7 July 2022	(Mexico) Héctor Herrera	(United States) Houston Dynamo	Released		
19 July 2022	(Spain) Vitolo	(Spain) Las Palmas	Loan		
28 July 2022	(Brazil) Samuel Lino	(Spain) Valencia	Loan		
29 July 2022	(Argentina) Nehuén Pérez	(Italy) Udinese	Transfer	Undisclosed	
1 August 2022	(Spain) Rodrigo Riquelme	(Spain) Girona	Loan		
12 August 2022	(Denmark) Daniel Wass	(Denmark) Brøndby	Transfer	€1.75M	
15 August 2022	(Colombia) Santiago Arias	Unattached	Released		
28 August 2022	(Brazil) Renan Lodi	(England) Nottingham Forest	Loan		
1 September 2022	(Brazil) Marcos Paulo	(Spain) Mirandés	Loan		
25 December 2022	(Brazil) Matheus Cunha	(England) Wolverhampton Wanderers	Loan		
28 December 2022	(Brazil) Marcos Paulo	(Brazil) São Paulo	Loan		
11 January 2023	(Portugal) João Félix	(England) Chelsea	Loan		
31 January 2023	(Brazil) Felipe	(England) Nottingham Forest	Transfer	€2.3M	

== Pre-season and friendlies ==
Win Draw Loss Fixtures

27 July 2022 Friendly	Numancia	0–4	Atlético Madrid	Burgo de Osma
19:00 CEST (UTC+2)	Carrillo (penalty missed) 4'; Sidibeh (yellow card) 62'	Report	Lemar 8'; Correa 32'; Kondogbia 45+1'; Cunha 52'	Stadium: Estadio Municipal de El Burgo de Osma; Referee: Eder Mallo Fernández

30 July 2022 Friendly	Manchester United	0–1	Atlético Madrid	Oslo, Norway
14:00 CEST (UTC+2)	Fred (yellow card) 28' (yellow-red card) 90+1'; McTominay (yellow card) 41'; Maguire (yellow card) 54'	Report	Lemar (yellow card) 23'; Mandava (yellow card) 35'; Oblak (yellow card) 41'; Saúl (yellow card) 84'; Félix 86'	Stadium: Ullevaal Stadion; Attendance: 26,129; Referee: Espen Eskås

4 August 2022 Ramón de Carranza Trophy	Cádiz	1–4	Atlético Madrid	Cádiz
21:00 CEST (UTC+2)	Cala (yellow card) 21'; Fali (yellow card) 45'; Gil (yellow card) 45'; Álvaro 87'	Report	Morata 13'; Saúl 45'; Wass 46'; Griezmann 51', (yellow card) 56'	Stadium: Nuevo Mirandilla; Referee: José Luis Munuera Montero

7 August 2022 Friendly	Juventus	0–4	Atlético Madrid	Turin, Italy
18:00 CEST (UTC+2)		Report	Morata 10', 43', 62'; Félix (penalty missed) 40'; Cunha 90+1'	Stadium: Juventus Training Center; Attendance: 0 Referee: Paride Tremoleda (Italy)
Note: The match was originally scheduled to be held in Tel Aviv, but was moved to Turin and played behind closed doors due to security concerns.

14 December 2022 Friendly	Ponferradina	2–4	Atlético Madrid	Ponferrada
18:00 CEST (UTC+2)	Tavares 31', 55'; Jaiteh (yellow card) 75'; Diéguez (yellow card) 87'	Report	Mandava 76'; Moreno 80'; Martín 83', 86'	Stadium: Estadio El Toralín; Referee: Oliver de la Fuente Ramos

12 April 2023 Friendly	Beşiktaş	2–0	Atlético Madrid	Istanbul, Turkey
20:30 TRT (UTC+3)	Fernandes 25'; Welinton (yellow card) 81'; Nkoudou 88'	Report		Stadium: Vodafone Park; Referee: Hüseyin Göçek (Turkey)

== Competitions ==
=== Overall record ===
Competition	First match	Last match	Starting round	Final position	Record							
Competition	First match	Last match	Starting round	Final position	Pld	W	D	L	GF	GA	GD	Win %
La Liga	15 August 2022	4 June 2023	Matchday 1	3rd	38	23	8	7	70	33	+37	60.53
Copa del Rey	12 November 2022	26 January 2023	First round	Quarter-finals	5	4	0	1	10	4	+6	80.00
UEFA Champions League	7 September 2022	1 November 2022	Group stage	Group stage	6	1	2	3	5	9	−4	16.67
Total					49	28	10	11	85	46	+39	57.14

Source: Soccerway

=== La Liga ===
==== League table ====
Pos	Team	Pld	W	D	L	GF	GA	GD	Pts	Qualification or relegation
1	Barcelona (C)	38	28	4	6	70	20	+50	88	Qualification for the Champions League group stage
2	Real Madrid	38	24	6	8	75	36	+39	78	Qualification for the Champions League group stage
3	Atlético Madrid	38	23	8	7	70	33	+37	77	Qualification for the Champions League group stage
4	Real Sociedad	38	21	8	9	51	35	+16	71	Qualification for the Champions League group stage
5	Villarreal	38	19	7	12	59	40	+19	64	Qualification for the Europa League group stage

Source: LaLiga Santander
Rules for classification: 1) Points; 2) Head-to-head points; 3) Head-to-head goal difference; 4) Goal difference; 5) Goals scored; 6) Fair-play points (Note: Head-to-head record is used only after all the matches between the teams in question have been played)
(C) Champions

==== Results summary ====
Overall								Home						Away					
Pld	W	D	L	GF	GA	GD	Pts	W	D	L	GF	GA	GD	W	D	L	GF	GA	GD
38	23	8	7	70	33	+37	77	13	3	3	41	15	+26	10	5	4	29	18	+11

Source: La Liga

==== Results by round ====
Round	1	2	3	4	5	6	7	8	9	10	11	12	13	14	15	16	17	18	19	20	21	22	23	24	25	26	27	28	29	30	31	32	33	34	35	36	37	38
Ground	A	H	A	A	H	H	A	H	A	H	A	A	H	A	H	H	A	H	A	H	A	H	A	H	A	H	H	A	H	A	H	A	H	A	H	A	H	A
Result	W	L	W	D	W	L	W	W	W	D	W	L	D	L	W	L	D	W	W	D	W	W	D	W	W	W	W	W	W	L	W	W	W	L	W	D	W	D
Position	1	8	6	7	7	7	5	4	3	4	3	3	3	5	4	5	4	4	4	4	4	4	4	3	3	3	3	3	3	3	3	3	2	3	2	3	3	3

Source: La Liga
A = Away; H = Home; W = Win; D = Draw; L = Loss

==== Matches ====
The league fixtures were announced on 23 June 2022.

15 August 2022 1	Getafe	0–3	Atlético Madrid	Getafe
19:30 CEST (UTC+2)	Ünal (yellow card) 19'; Aleñá (yellow card) 55'	Report	Morata 15', 59'; Griezmann 75'; Carrasco (yellow card) 90'	Stadium: Coliseum Alfonso Pérez; Attendance: 12,235; Referee: José María Sánchez Martínez

21 August 2022 2	Atlético Madrid	0–2	Villarreal	Madrid
19:30 CEST (UTC+2)	Félix (yellow card) 48'; Giménez (yellow card) 90+1'; Molina (red card) 90+4'	Report	Pino 73'; Parejo (yellow card) 90+3'; Baena (yellow card) 90+4'; Gerard 90+7', (yellow card) 90+9'	Stadium: Cívitas Metropolitano; Attendance: 57,033; Referee: Ricardo de Burgos Bengoetxea

29 August 2022 3	Valencia	0–1	Atlético Madrid	Valencia
22:00 CEST (UTC+2)	Marcos André (yellow card) 18'; Correia (yellow card) 42'; Cömert (yellow card) 76'; Pérez (yellow card) 83'	Report	Saúl (yellow card) 14'; Mandava (yellow card) 27'; Félix (yellow card) 55'; Griezmann 66'	Stadium: Mestalla; Attendance: 43,910; Referee: Guillermo Cuadra Fernández

3 September 2022 4	Real Sociedad	1–1	Atlético Madrid	San Sebastián
18:30 CEST (UTC+2)	Zubimendi (yellow card) 28'; Cho (yellow card) 35'; Sadiq 55'; Zubeldia (yellow card) 57'; Gorosabel (yellow card) 72'; Merino (yellow card) 90+7'	Report	Morata 5', (yellow card) 61'; Saúl (yellow card) 12'; De Paul (yellow card) 24'; Llorente (yellow card) 35'	Stadium: Anoeta; Attendance: 35,366; Referee: César Soto Grado

10 September 2022 5	Atlético Madrid	4–1	Celta Vigo	Madrid
21:00 CEST (UTC+2)	Correa 9'; Hermoso (yellow card) 16'; De Paul 50'; Koke (yellow card) 56'; Carrasco 66'; Núñez 82' (o.g.)	Report	Núñez (yellow card) 16'; Veiga 71', (yellow card) 90+4'; Aspas (yellow card) 90+4'	Stadium: Cívitas Metropolitano; Attendance: 52,247; Referee: Alejandro Hernández Hernández

18 September 2022 6	Atlético Madrid	1–2	Real Madrid	Madrid
21:00 CEST (UTC+2)	Mandava (yellow card) 28'; Koke (yellow card) 63'; Hermoso 83', (yellow card) 89' (yellow-red card) 90+1'	Report	Rodrygo 18'; Mendy (yellow card) 33'; Valverde 36'; Carvajal (yellow card) 88'	Stadium: Cívitas Metropolitano; Attendance: 66,881; Referee: José Luis Munuera Montero

1 October 2022 7	Sevilla	0–2	Atlético Madrid	Seville
18:30 CEST (UTC+2)	Isco (yellow card) 11'; Delaney (yellow card) 31'; Gudelj (yellow card) 81'	Report	Llorente 29'; Witsel (yellow card) 38'; Morata 57'; Félix (yellow card) 90+3'	Stadium: Ramón Sánchez Pizjuán; Attendance: 37,754; Referee: Ricardo de Burgos Bengoetxea

8 October 2022 8	Atlético Madrid	2–1	Girona	Madrid
16:15 CEST (UTC+2)	Correa 5', 48'; Giménez (yellow card) 45+1'; Cunha (yellow card) 49'; Savić (yellow card) 89'	Report	Hernández (yellow card) 55'; Riquelme 66'	Stadium: Cívitas Metropolitano; Attendance: 54,069; Referee: Juan Martínez Munuera

15 October 2022 9	Athletic Bilbao	0–1	Atlético Madrid	Bilbao
21:00 CEST (UTC+2)		Report	Giménez (yellow card) 36'; Griezmann 47'; Morata (yellow card) 57'; Oblak (yellow card) 68'; Saúl (yellow card) 85'; Witsel (yellow card) 90+2'; Grbić (yellow card) 90+5'	Stadium: San Mamés; Attendance: 48,391; Referee: Jorge Figueroa Vázquez

18 October 2022 10	Atlético Madrid	1–1	Rayo Vallecano	Madrid
21:00 CEST (UTC+2)	Morata 20'; Savić (yellow card) 47'; Saúl (yellow card) 88'; Giménez (yellow card) 90+1'	Report	Falcao 90+2' (pen.)	Stadium: Cívitas Metropolitano; Attendance: 46,803; Referee: Javier Iglesias Villanueva

23 October 2022 11	Real Betis	1–2	Atlético Madrid	Seville
16:15 CEST (UTC+2)	Rodríguez (yellow card) 58'; Fekir 84'; Silva (yellow card) 89'	Report	Molina (yellow card) 38'; Griezmann 54', 71'; Morata (yellow card) 57'; Kondogbia (yellow card) 69'	Stadium: Benito Villamarín; Attendance: 50,179; Referee: Jesús Gil Manzano

29 October 2022 12	Cádiz	3–2	Atlético Madrid	Cádiz
16:15 CET (UTC+1)	Bongonda 1'; San Emeterio (yellow card) 65'; Fernández 81'; Chust (yellow card) 87'; Sobrino 90+9'	Report	Kondogbia (yellow card) 62'; Saúl (yellow card) 78'; Félix 85', 89', (yellow card) 90+6'; Cunha (yellow card) 90'	Stadium: Nuevo Mirandilla; Attendance: 18,183; Referee: José María Sánchez Martínez

6 November 2022 13	Atlético Madrid	1–1	Espanyol	Madrid
14:00 CET (UTC+1)	Kondogbia (yellow card) 59'; Félix 78', (yellow card) 88'; Giménez (yellow card) 83'	Report	Cabrera (red card) 28'; Oliván (yellow card) 34'; Braithwaite (yellow card) 53'; Darder 62'; Lecomte (yellow card) 74'; Vidal (yellow card) 85'; Omar (yellow card) 90+5'	Stadium: Cívitas Metropolitano; Attendance: 50,007; Referee: Juan Luis Pulido Santana

9 November 2022 14	Mallorca	1–0	Atlético Madrid	Palma
21:30 CET (UTC+1)	Muriqi 16'; Baba (yellow card) 26'; Lee (yellow card) 36'; Ruiz de Galarreta (yellow card) 71'; Grenier (yellow card) 90+3'; Valjent (yellow card) 90+3'	Report	Molina (yellow card) 15'; De Paul (yellow card) 34'; Correa (yellow card) 90+6'	Stadium: Visit Mallorca Stadium; Attendance: 14,475; Referee: Mario Melero López

29 December 2022 15	Atlético Madrid	2–0	Elche	Madrid
21:30 CET (UTC+1)	Hermoso (yellow card) 50' (yellow-red card) 53'; Félix 56'; Morata 74'; Barrios (yellow card) 76'	Report	Verdú (red card) 45+1'; Rogelio (yellow card) 48'; Collado (yellow card) 80'; Quina (yellow card) 86' (yellow-red card) 90'	Stadium: Cívitas Metropolitano; Attendance: 38,119; Referee: Guillermo Cuadra Fernández

8 January 2023 16	Atlético Madrid	0–1	Barcelona	Madrid
21:00 CET (UTC+1)	Correa (yellow card) 79'; Molina (yellow card) 85'; Savić (red card) 90+2'	Report	Dembélé 22'; Araújo (yellow card) 56'; Christensen (yellow card) 82'; Raphinha (yellow card) 87'; Torres (red card) 90+2'	Stadium: Cívitas Metropolitano; Attendance: 63,493; Referee: José Luis Munuera Montero

15 January 2023 17	Almería	1–1	Atlético Madrid	Almería
16:15 CET (UTC+1)	Baptistão (yellow card) 17'; Touré 37'; Embarba (yellow card) 67'; Mendes (yellow card) 85'; Ely (yellow card) 90+3'	Report	Correa 18'; Kondogbia (yellow card) 40'; Reguilón (yellow card) 85' (yellow-red card) 89'; Saúl (yellow card) 90+2'	Stadium: Estadio de los Juegos Mediterráneos; Attendance: 14,128; Referee: José María Sánchez Martínez

21 January 2023 18	Atlético Madrid	3–0	Valladolid	Madrid
18:30 CET (UTC+1)	Morata 18'; Griezmann 23'; Hermoso 28'; Mandava (yellow card) 36'	Report	Kike (yellow card) 38'	Stadium: Cívitas Metropolitano; Attendance: 53,253; Referee: Ricardo de Burgos Bengoetxea

29 January 2023 19	Osasuna	0–1	Atlético Madrid	Pamplona
16:15 CET (UTC+1)	Brašanac (yellow card) 70'	Report	Saúl 74'	Stadium: El Sadar; Attendance: 20,934; Referee: Javier Alberola Rojas

4 February 2023 20	Atlético Madrid	1–1	Getafe	Madrid
18:30 CET (UTC+1)	Koke (yellow card) 57'; Correa 60'; Saúl (yellow card) 81'; Depay (yellow card) 90'	Report	Djené (yellow card) 2'; Portu (yellow card) 34'; Aleñá (yellow card) 45+2'; Ünal 83' (pen.); Munir (yellow card) 90+5'; Álvarez (yellow card) 90+6'	Stadium: Cívitas Metropolitano; Attendance: 56,079; Referee: Antonio Mateu Lahoz

12 February 2023 21	Celta Vigo	0–1	Atlético Madrid	Vigo
16:15 CET (UTC+1)	Aidoo (yellow card) 4'; Veiga (yellow card) 8'	Report	Mandava (yellow card) 41'; Savić (red card) 70'; Molina (yellow card) 87'; Depay 89'	Stadium: Balaídos; Attendance: 15,461; Referee: Jorge Figueroa Vásquez

19 February 2023 22	Atlético Madrid	1–0	Athletic Bilbao	Madrid
18:30 CET (UTC+1)	Giménez (yellow card) 36'; De Paul (yellow card) 45'; Griezmann 73'	Report	D. García (yellow card) 33'; Yeray (yellow card) 55'; Vivian (yellow card) 66'	Stadium: Cívitas Metropolitano; Attendance: 61,617; Referee: Juan Martínez Munuera

25 February 2023 23	Real Madrid	1–1	Atlético Madrid	Madrid
18:30 CET (UTC+1)	Militão (yellow card) 7'; Nacho (yellow card) 56'; Rodríguez 85'; Modrić (yellow card) 90'	Report	Koke (yellow card) 22'; Llorente (yellow card) 36'; Correa (red card) 64'; Molina (yellow card) 71'; Giménez 78'	Stadium: Santiago Bernabéu; Attendance: 64,721; Referee: Jesús Gil Manzano

4 March 2023 24	Atlético Madrid	6–1	Sevilla	Madrid
21:00 CET (UTC+1)	Depay 23', 26'; Giménez (yellow card) 40'; Griezmann 53'; Carrasco 69'; Morata 76', 90+2'	Report	Gueye (yellow card) 25' (yellow-red card) 80'; En-Nesyri 39'; Acuña (yellow card) 55'; Rakitić (penalty missed) 74'; Montiel (yellow card) 81'	Stadium: Cívitas Metropolitano; Attendance: 57,737; Referee: Guillermo Cuadra Fernández

13 March 2023 25	Girona	0–1	Atlético Madrid	Girona
21:00 CET (UTC+1)	Stuani (yellow card) 90+11'; Gazzaniga (yellow card) 90+12'	Report	Llorente (yellow card) 57'; Savić (yellow card) 66'; Morata 90+1'; De Paul (yellow card) 90+8'	Stadium: Estadi Montilivi; Attendance: 12,499; Referee: Mario Melero López

18 March 2023 26	Atlético Madrid	3–0	Valencia	Madrid
21:00 CET (UTC+1)	Griezmann (yellow card) 4', (goal) 23'; Llorente (yellow card) 42'; Carrasco 49'; Lemar 67'	Report		Stadium: Cívitas Metropolitano; Attendance: 58,317; Referee: José Luis Munuera Montero

2 April 2023 27	Atlético Madrid	1–0	Real Betis	Madrid
21:00 CEST (UTC+2)	Molina (yellow card) 36'; Correa 86'	Report	Pérez (yellow card) 61'; Willian José (yellow card) 90+2'	Stadium: Cívitas Metropolitano; Attendance: 61,623; Referee: Juan Martínez Munuera

9 April 2023 28	Rayo Vallecano	1–2	Atlético Madrid	Madrid
21:00 CEST (UTC+2)	Lejeune (red card) 62'; F. García 85'	Report	Molina 22'; Hermoso 24'	Stadium: Campo de Fútbol de Vallecas; Attendance: 13,512; Referee: Ricardo de Burgos Bengoetxea

16 April 2023 29	Atlético Madrid	2–1	Almería	Madrid
18:30 CEST (UTC+2)	Griezmann 5', 43'; Llorente (yellow card) 77'; Kondogbia (yellow card) 89'; Barrios (yellow card) 90+4'	Report	Babić (yellow card) 28'; Baptistão 37'; Ely (yellow card) 49'; Ramazani (yellow card) 90+4'	Stadium: Cívitas Metropolitano; Attendance: 59,204; Referee: Isidro Díaz de Mera Escuderos

23 April 2023 30	Barcelona	1–0	Atlético Madrid	Barcelona
16:15 CEST (UTC+2)	Alonso (yellow card) 28'; Torres 44'; Busquets (yellow card) 57'; Raphinha (yellow card) 78'; Gavi (yellow card) 90'	Report	Griezmann (yellow card) 75'; Savić (yellow card) 80'; Giménez (yellow card) 81'; Barrios (yellow card) 83'; Reguilón (yellow card) 84'; Morata (yellow card) 86'; Saúl (yellow card) 90+4'	Stadium: Camp Nou; Attendance: 80,965; Referee: José María Sánchez Martínez

26 April 2023 31	Atlético Madrid	3–1	Mallorca	Madrid
19:30 CEST (UTC+2)	De Paul 45+2'; Morata 47'; Carrasco 77'	Report	Nastasić 20'	Stadium: Cívitas Metropolitano; Attendance: 58,523; Referee: Juan Luis Pulido Santana

30 April 2023 32	Valladolid	2–5	Atlético Madrid	Valladolid
21:00 CEST (UTC+2)	Monchu (yellow card) 9'; Larin 42' (pen.); Kike (yellow card) 44'; Escudero 74'	Report	Molina 20'; Giménez 24'; Morata 38'; Hermoso (yellow card) 40'; Joaquín 86' (o.g.); Depay 90+3'	Stadium: José Zorrilla; Attendance: 23,321; Referee: Antonio Miguel Mateu Lahoz

3 May 2023 33	Atlético Madrid	5–1	Cádiz	Madrid
22:00 CEST (UTC+2)	Griezmann 2', 27'; Carrasco (yellow card) 21', (goal) 57' (pen.); Lemar (yellow card) 36'; Molina (yellow card) 44', (goal) 73'; Morata 49'	Report	Diarra (yellow card) 16'; Alejo (yellow card) 38'; Lozano 72'	Stadium: Cívitas Metropolitano; Attendance: 42,023; Referee: César Soto Grado

14 May 2023 34	Elche	1–0	Atlético Madrid	Elche
16:15 CEST (UTC+2)	Fidel (yellow card) 30', (goal) 41'; Blanco (yellow card) 36'	Report		Stadium: Estadio Manuel Martínez Valero; Referee: Alejandro Muñiz Ruiz

21 May 2023 35	Atlético Madrid	3–0	Osasuna	Madrid
16:15 CEST (UTC+2)	Carrasco 44'; Saúl 62'; Correa 82'	Report	Budimir (yellow card) 28'; Peña (yellow card) 65'	Stadium: Cívitas Metropolitano; Attendance: 57,012; Referee: Pablo González Fuertes

24 May 2023 36	Espanyol	3–3	Atlético Madrid	Cornellà de Llobregat
22:00 CEST (UTC+2)	Montes 64'; Vidal (yellow card) 66'; Joselu 76' (pen.); Vinícius 79', (yellow card) 80'	Report	Saúl 21'; Griezmann 44'; Carrasco 46'; Grbić (yellow card) 75'; Martín (yellow card) 89'; Giménez (yellow card) 90+4'	Stadium: RCDE Stadium; Attendance: 25,822; Referee: Mario Melero López

28 May 2023 37	Atlético Madrid	2–1	Real Sociedad	Madrid
19:00 CEST (UTC+2)	Griezmann 37'; De Paul (yellow card) 59'; Hermoso (yellow card) 63'; Molina 73'	Report	Merino (yellow card) 27'; Elustondo (yellow card) 54'; Sørloth 88'	Stadium: Cívitas Metropolitano; Attendance: 56,169; Referee: Juan Luis Pulido Santana

4 June 2023 38	Villarreal	2–2	Atlético Madrid	Villarreal
18:30 CEST (UTC+2)	Jackson 15'; Moreno (yellow card) 36'; Capoue (yellow card) 40'; Baena (yellow card) 75'; Pascual 90+2'	Report	Correa 18', 56', (yellow card) 76'; Barrios (yellow card) 69'; Witsel (red card) 70'	Stadium: Estadio de la Cerámica; Attendance: 18,226; Referee: Ricardo de Burgos Bengoetxea

=== Copa del Rey ===
12 November 2022 First round	Almazán	0–2	Atlético Madrid	Soria
22:00 CET (UTC+1)	García (yellow card) 16'; Caballero (yellow card) 26'; Tabernero (yellow card) 56'	Report	Correa 35'; Félix 63'; Giménez (yellow card) 77'	Stadium: Los Pajaritos; Referee: Isidro Díaz de Mera Escuderos

22 December 2022 Second round	Arenteiro	1–3	Atlético Madrid	O Carballiño
21:00 CET (UTC+1)	Marquitos 42'; Bueso (yellow card) 45'; Escobar (yellow card) 86'; Cruz (yellow card) 89'; Fernández (yellow card) 90+4'	Report	Giménez (yellow card) 18'; Carrasco 45+1' (pen.), 90+1'; Hermoso (yellow card) 49'; Morata (yellow card) 56'; Lemar (yellow card) 59'; Barrios 76'	Stadium: Espiñedo; Attendance: 4,000; Referee: Pablo González Fuertes

4 January 2023 Round of 32	Oviedo	0–2	Atlético Madrid	Oviedo
20:00 CET (UTC+1)		Report	Llorente 24'; Giménez (yellow card) 44'; Witsel (yellow card) 80'; Griezmann (yellow card) 82'; Barrios 83'	Stadium: Carlos Tartiere; Attendance: 27,303; Referee: Alejandro Muñiz Ruiz

18 January 2023 Round of 16	Levante	0–2	Atlético Madrid	Valencia
21:00 CET (UTC+1)	Muñoz (yellow card) 70'; Campaña (yellow card) 85'	Report	Morata 54'; Llorente 90+1'	Stadium: Ciutat de València; Attendance: 18,000; Referee: Jorge Figueroa Vázquez

26 January 2023 Quarter-finals	Real Madrid	3–1 (a.e.t.)	Atlético Madrid	Madrid
21:00 UTC+1	Ceballos (yellow card) 69'; Rodrygo 79'; Vinícius (yellow card) 97', (goal) 120+1'; Benzema 104'	Report	Morata 19'; De Paul (yellow card) 44'; Mandava (yellow card) 54'; Hermoso (yellow card) 62'; Savić (yellow card) 96' (yellow-red card) 99'; Koke (yellow card) 105+2'	Stadium: Santiago Bernabéu; Attendance: 68,000; Referee: César Soto Grado

=== UEFA Champions League ===
==== Group stage ====
The draw for the group stage was held on 25 August 2022.

Pos	Team	Pld	W	D	L	GF	GA	GD	Pts	Qualification	POR	BRU	LEV	ATM
1	(Portugal) Porto	6	4	0	2	12	7	+5	12	Advance to knockout phase	—	0–4	2–0	2–1
2	(Belgium) Club Brugge	6	3	2	1	7	4	+3	11	Advance to knockout phase	0–4	—	1–0	2–0
3	(Germany) Bayer Leverkusen	6	1	2	3	4	8	−4	5 (Note: Head-to-head points: Bayer Leverkusen 4, Atlético Madrid 1.)	Transfer to Europa League	0–3	0–0	—	2–0
4	(Spain) Atlético Madrid	6	1	2	3	5	9	−4	5		2–1	0–0	2–2	—

Source: UEFA
Rules for classification: Group stage tiebreakers
Notes:

7 September 2022 1	Atlético Madrid (Spain)	2–1	(Portugal) Porto	Madrid, Spain
21:00 CEST (UTC+2)	Koke (yellow card) 56'; Hermoso 90+1', (yellow card) 90+5'; Griezmann 90+11'	Report	Pepê (yellow card) 54'; Uribe (yellow card) 68', (goal) 90+6' (pen.); Taremi (yellow card) 71' (yellow-red card) 81'	Stadium: Cívitas Metropolitano; Attendance: 51,777; Referee: Szymon Marciniak (Poland)

13 September 2022 2	Bayer Leverkusen (Germany)	2–0	(Spain) Atlético Madrid	Leverkusen, Germany
21:00 CEST (UTC+2)	Kossounou (yellow card) 32'; Tah (yellow card) 39'; Andrich (yellow card) 77', (goal) 84'; Diaby 87'	Report		Stadium: BayArena; Attendance: 25,825; Referee: Michael Oliver (England)

4 October 2022 3	Club Brugge (Belgium)	2–0	(Spain) Atlético Madrid	Bruges, Belgium
21:00 CEST (UTC+2)	Sowah 36'; Odoi (yellow card) 37'; Onyedika (yellow card) 45+1'; Jutglà 62'; Buchanan (yellow card) 70'; Mignolet (yellow card) 75'; Sylla (yellow card) 88'	Report	Mandava (yellow card) 53'; Savić (yellow card) 61'; Griezmann (penalty missed) 76'	Stadium: Jan Breydel Stadium; Attendance: 25,667; Referee: István Kovács (Romania)

12 October 2022 4	Atlético Madrid (Spain)	0–0	(Belgium) Club Brugge	Madrid, Spain
18:45 CEST (UTC+2)	Savić (yellow card) 45+2'; Kondogbia (yellow card) 80'	Report	Buchanan (yellow card) 44'; Sowah (yellow card) 45+2' (yellow-red card) 82'; Vanaken (yellow card) 46'; Mignolet (yellow card) 90'	Stadium: Cívitas Metropolitano; Attendance: 60,810; Referee: Danny Makkelie (Netherlands)

26 October 2022 5	Atlético Madrid (Spain)	2–2	(Germany) Bayer Leverkusen	Madrid, Spain
21:00 CEST (UTC+2)	Carrasco 22', (penalty missed) 90+9'; De Paul 50'; Giménez (yellow card) 79'; Kondogbia (yellow card) 87'	Report	Diaby 9'; Hudson-Odoi 29'; Hrádecký (yellow card) 65'; Bakker (yellow card) 66'; Hincapié (yellow card) 78'	Stadium: Cívitas Metropolitano; Attendance: 63,803; Referee: Clément Turpin (France)

1 November 2022 6	Porto (Portugal)	2–1	(Spain) Atlético Madrid	Porto, Portugal
17:45 WET (UTC±0)	Taremi 5'; Eustáquio 24'; Grujić (yellow card) 39'; Cardoso (yellow card) 68'	Report	Mandava (yellow card) 42'; Savić (yellow card) 48'; De Paul (yellow card) 69'; Marcano 90+5' (o.g.)	Stadium: Estádio do Dragão; Attendance: 47,546; Referee: Daniele Orsato (Italy)

== Statistics ==
=== Squad statistics ===
No.	Pos	Nat	Player	Total		La Liga		Copa del Rey		Champions League	
No.	Pos	Nat	Player	Apps	Goals	Apps	Goals	Apps	Goals	Apps	Goals
Goalkeepers
1	GK	(Croatia) CRO	Ivo Grbić	13	0	10+2	0	0	0	1	0
13	GK	(Slovenia) SLO	Jan Oblak	38	0	28	0	5	0	5	0
31	GK	(Spain) ESP	Antonio Gomis	1	0	0+1	0	0	0	0	0
Defenders
2	DF	(Uruguay) URU	José Giménez	36	2	26+2	2	2+1	0	5	0
3	DF	(Spain) ESP	Sergio Reguilón	12	0	2+9	0	0+1	0	0	0
12	DF	(Republic of Ireland) IRL	Matt Doherty	2	0	0+2	0	0	0	0	0
15	DF	(Montenegro) MNE	Stefan Savić	29	0	22	0	4	0	3	0
16	DF	(Argentina) ARG	Nahuel Molina	43	4	33	4	4	0	6	0
22	DF	(Spain) ESP	Mario Hermoso	34	4	24+2	3	5	0	2+1	1
23	DF	(Mozambique) MOZ	Reinildo Mandava	33	0	22	0	3+2	0	6	0
Midfielders
4	MF	(Central African Republic) CAF	Geoffrey Kondogbia	27	0	10+10	0	1+3	0	2+1	0
5	MF	(Argentina) ARG	Rodrigo De Paul	38	3	24+6	2	2+1	0	1+4	1
6	MF	(Spain) ESP	Koke	42	0	30+3	0	4+1	0	4	0
11	MF	(France) FRA	Thomas Lemar	32	1	17+10	1	3	0	1+1	0
14	MF	(Spain) ESP	Marcos Llorente	29	3	20+2	1	4	2	3	0
17	MF	(Spain) ESP	Saúl	38	3	10+21	3	1+1	0	4+1	0
20	MF	(Belgium) BEL	Axel Witsel	43	0	25+8	0	3+1	0	5+1	0
21	MF	(Belgium) BEL	Yannick Carrasco	44	10	26+9	7	2+1	2	3+3	1
24	MF	(Spain) ESP	Pablo Barrios	26	2	6+15	0	2+2	2	0+1	0
32	MF	(Spain) ESP	Alberto Moreno	1	0	0	0	0+1	0	0	0
Forwards
8	FW	(France) FRA	Antoine Griezmann	48	16	31+7	15	4	0	4+2	1
9	FW	(Netherlands) NED	Memphis Depay	9	4	3+5	4	0+1	0	0	0
10	FW	(Argentina) ARG	Ángel Correa	44	10	12+22	9	2+2	1	3+3	0
19	FW	(Spain) ESP	Álvaro Morata	45	15	23+13	13	4	2	4+1	0
29	FW	(Spain) ESP	Carlos Martín	4	0	0+4	0	0	0	0	0
Players who have made an appearance this season but have left the club
7	FW	(Portugal) POR	João Félix	20	5	7+7	4	1	1	3+2	0
9	FW	(Brazil) BRA	Matheus Cunha	17	0	2+9	0	0+1	0	0+5	0
12	DF	(Brazil) BRA	Renan Lodi	0	0	0	0	0	0	0	0
18	DF	(Brazil) BRA	Felipe	4	0	2+1	0	0	0	1	0
26	FW	(Portugal) POR	Marcos Paulo	0	0	0	0	0	0	0	0

=== Goalscorers ===
Rank	No.	Pos.	Nat.	Player	La Liga	Copa del Rey	Champions League	Total
1	8	FW	(France)	Antoine Griezmann	15	0	1	16
2	19	FW	(Spain)	Álvaro Morata	13	2	0	15
3	10	FW	(Argentina)	Ángel Correa	9	1	0	10
3	21	MF	(Belgium)	Yannick Carrasco	7	2	1	10
5	7	FW	(Portugal)	João Félix^{1}	4	1	0	5
6	9	FW	(Netherlands)	Memphis Depay	4	0	0	4
6	16	DF	(Argentina)	Nahuel Molina	4	0	0	4
6	22	DF	(Spain)	Mario Hermoso	3	0	1	4
9	5	MF	(Argentina)	Rodrigo De Paul	2	0	1	3
9	14	MF	(Spain)	Marcos Llorente	1	2	0	3
9	17	MF	(Spain)	Saúl	3	0	0	3
12	2	DF	(Uruguay)	José Giménez	2	0	0	2
12	24	MF	(Spain)	Pablo Barrios	0	2	0	2
14	11	MF	(France)	Thomas Lemar	1	0	0	1
Own goals					2	0	1	3
Totals					70	10	5	85

^{1}Player left the club during the season.
