= Carlos Giménez (footballer) =

Spanish footballer (born 2003)

Personal information
- Full name: Carlos Giménez Bachiller
- Date of birth: 18 February 2003 (age 23)
- Place of birth: Sedaví, Spain
- Height: 1.82 m (6 ft 0 in)
- Position: Centre back

Team information
- Current team: Atletico Madrid B
- Number: 49

Youth career
- Valencia
- 2016–2019: Levante
- 2019–2020: Patacona
- 2020–2021: Levante

Senior career*
Years	Team	Apps	(Gls)
2021–2023	Levante B	49	(2)
2023–2024	Levante	1	(0)
2024–2025	→ Unionistas (loan)	36	(1)
2025–2026	Atlético Madrid B	25	(0)
2026	→ PAOK B (loan)	7	(0)
- * Club domestic league appearances and goals as of 20 April 2026

Carlos Giménez Bachiller (born 18 February 2003) is a Spanish footballer who plays as a central defender for Atletico Madrid B.

== Club career ==
Born in Sedaví, Valencian Community, Giménez joined Levante UD's youth setup in 2016, from cross-town rivals Valencia CF. Promoted to the reserves in Segunda División RFEF ahead of the 2021–22 season, he made his senior debut on 3 October 2021, coming on as a first-half substitute in a 1–0 away loss against CF La Nucía.

On 14 March 2022, after establishing himself as a regular starter for the B-team, Giménez renewed his contract with the Granotes until 2024. He scored his first senior goal on 2 October, netting the B's winner through a free kick in a 1–0 Tercera Federación away success over CF Gandía.

Giménez made his first team debut for Levante on 9 April 2023, replacing Marc Pubill in a 1–1 draw at SD Eibar in the Segunda División. On 17 July, he was loaned to Primera Federación side Unionistas de Salamanca CF, for one year.

On 31 May 2024, after being a regular starter for Unionistas, Giménez renewed his contract with the Granotas until June 2026. On 24 June, however, he moved to Atlético Madrid B on a three-year deal.
