= Giuliano Simeone =

Argentine footballer (born 2002)

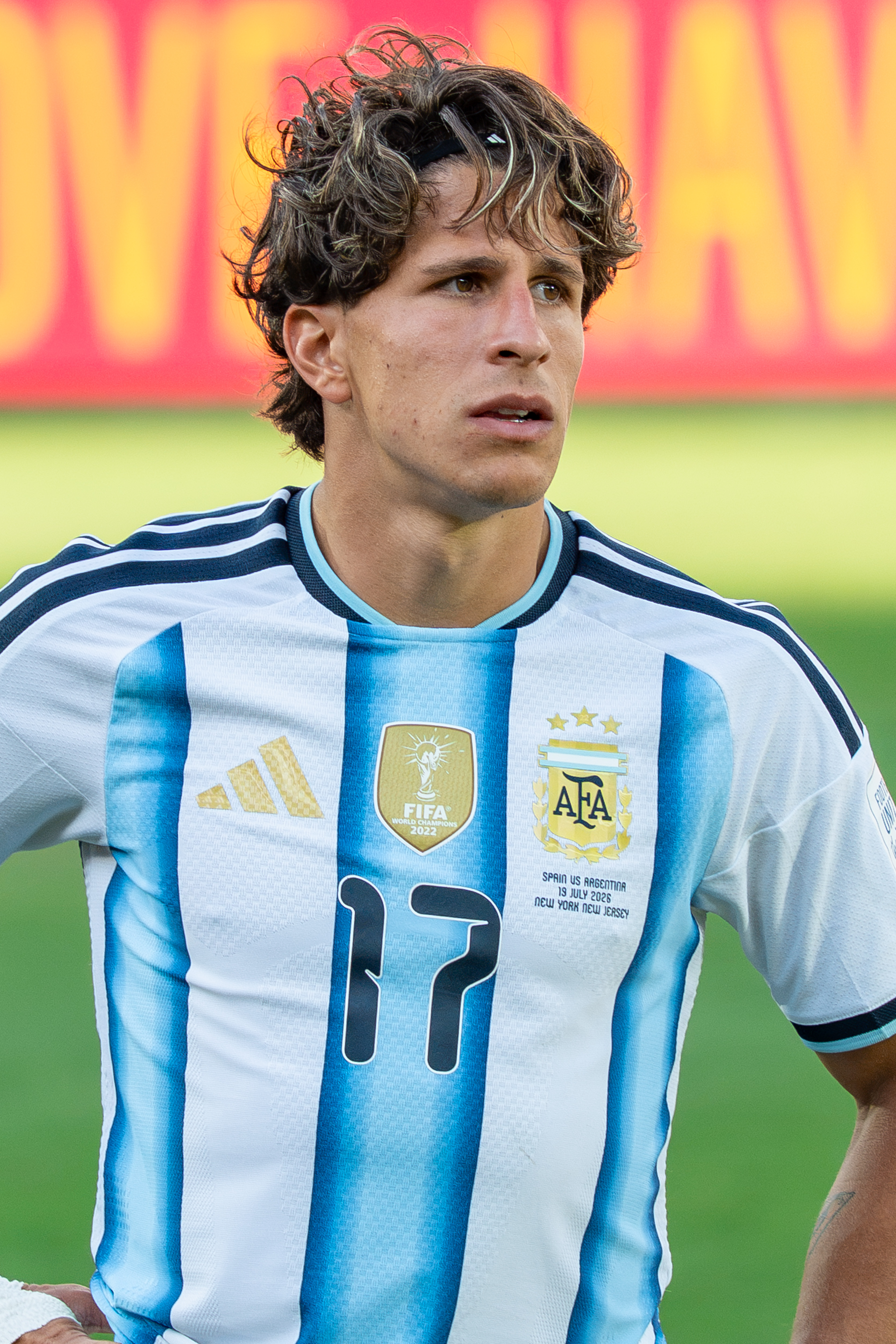
- Simeone with Argentina in 2026

Personal information
- Full name: Giuliano Simeone Baldini
- Date of birth: 18 December 2002 (age 23)
- Place of birth: Rome, Italy
- Height: 1.73 m (5 ft 8 in)
- Positions: Right midfielder; winger

Team information
- Current team: Atlético Madrid
- Number: 20

Youth career
- 2007–2019: River Plate
- 2019–2021: Atlético Madrid

Senior career*
Years	Team	Apps	(Gls)
2021–2022	Atlético Madrid B	51	(29)
2022–	Atlético Madrid	78	(10)
2022–2023	→ Zaragoza (loan)	36	(9)
2023–2024	→ Alavés (loan)	14	(1)

International career^{‡}
2024–	Argentina U23	2	(2)
2024	Argentina Olympic	5	(1)
2024–	Argentina	17	(3)
Medal record
Men's football
Representing Argentina
FIFA World Cup
Runner-up	2026 Canada–Mexico–US
- * Club domestic league appearances and goals as of 23:03, 22 November 2026 (UTC) ‡ National team caps and goals as of 03:07, 4 October 2026 (UTC)

Giuliano Simeone Baldini (Italian: [dʒuˈljaːno simeˈoːne]; born 18 December 2002) is an Argentinian professional footballer who plays as a right midfielder or winger for La Liga club Atlético Madrid and the Argentina national team.

== Early life ==
Born in Rome when his father, Diego Simeone, was playing for Lazio, Simeone returned to Argentina to live with his mother at the age of four, and began his career with River Plate. In September 2019, he moved to Atlético Madrid's youth categories; as he had not signed a professional contract with River, the club was unable to retain him, and the move was later approved by FIFA. He then joined the Juvenil squad that same year.

== Club career ==
=== Atlético Madrid B ===
Simeone made his senior debut with Atleti's B-team on 17 January 2021, starting and scoring the opener in a 1–1 Segunda División B away draw against UD Poblense. He scored three further goals in the season, but his team suffered relegation.

After spending the 2021 pre-season with the first team, Simeone returned to the B's now in Tercera División RFEF, scoring eight goals in 11 matches between the months of November and December.

He debuted with the senior Atlético Madrid side in a 0–0 La Liga tie with Granada on 20 April 2022, coming on as a sub in the 91st minute.

=== Loans to Real Zaragoza and Alavés ===
On 4 July 2022, Simeone was loaned to Segunda División side Real Zaragoza for the season. He scored his first professional goal two months later, netting the opener in a 2–1 home loss against CD Lugo.

On 21 July 2023, Simeone renewed his contract with Atleti until 2028, and subsequently moved on loan to Deportivo Alavés in the top tier, for one year. On 6 August, during a pre-season friendly against Burgos CF, he broke his fibula and also suffered an ankle injury after a tackle from José Joaquín Matos.

=== Return to Atlético Madrid ===
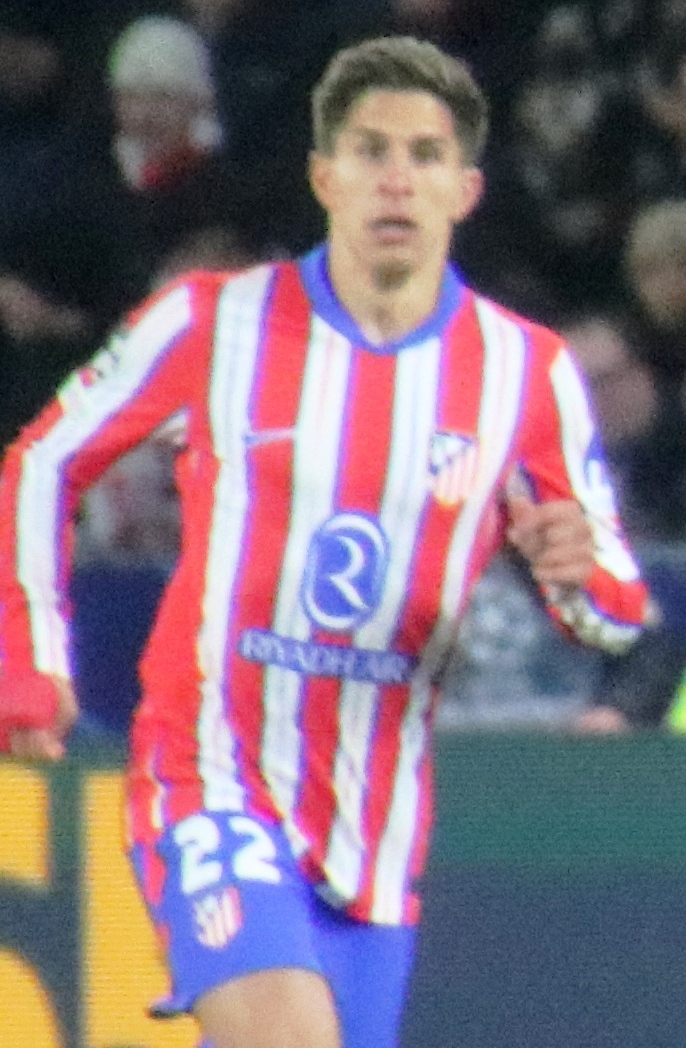
Simeone with Atlético Madrid in 2025

In July 2024, Simeone returned to his parent club, Atlético Madrid, ahead of the 2024–25 season. On 3 November, he scored his first goal for the club in a 2–0 win over Las Palmas. On 29 January 2025, he scored his first UEFA Champions League goal and provided an assist in a 4–1 away win over RB Salzburg.

On 15 January 2026, Simeone extended his contract with Atlético Madrid until 30 June 2030.

== International career ==
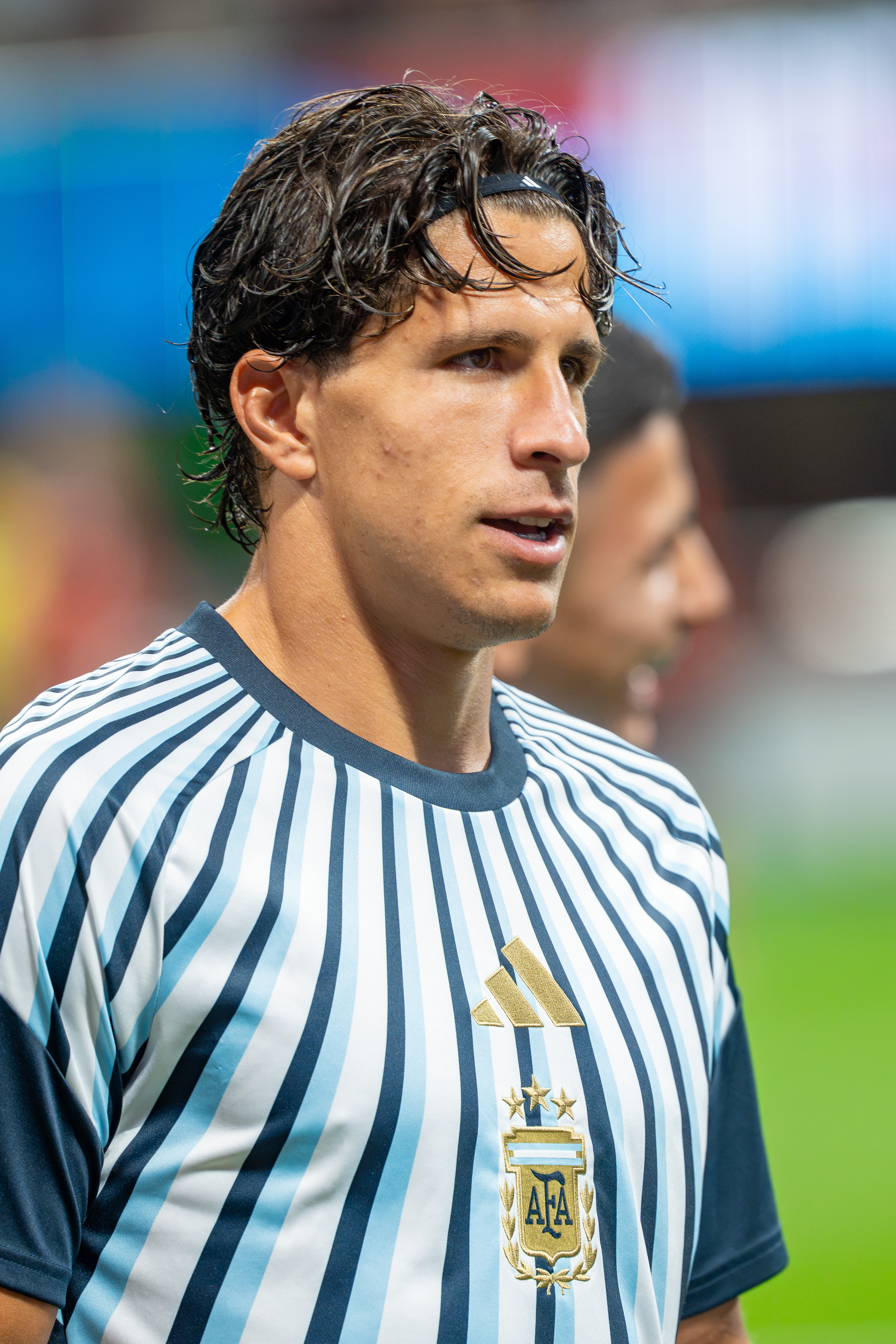
Simeone with Argentina in 2026

Simeone competed for Argentina at the 2024 Summer Olympics.

On 19 November 2024, Simeone debuted for Argentina against Peru in a 2026 FIFA World cup qualification. In doing so, he became the second son of Diego Simeone to play for Argentina after Giovanni Simeone. On 25 March 2025, Simeone scored his first goal for Argentina in a 4–1 victory in the same competition against Brazil.

On 27 May 2026, Simeone was selected in the 26-man squad for the 2026 FIFA World Cup by manager Lionel Scaloni. He started his first World Cup game in a 3–1 group stage win over Jordan a month later on 27 June. Regarding Argentina's meager attacking chances in the 2026 FIFA World Cup final, Simeone was the second most influential Argentine player in creating and executing them, behind Lionel Messi.

== Personal life ==
Simeone is the son of his current manager at Atlético Madrid, Diego. His brothers Giovanni and Gianluca were also footballers, with the former having also played for Argentina internationally, and the latter retiring in 2025.

== Career statistics ==
=== Club ===
As of match played 22 November 2026

Appearances and goals by club, season and competition
Club	Season	League			Copa del Rey		Europe		Other		Total	
Club	Season	Division	Apps	Goals	Apps	Goals	Apps	Goals	Apps	Goals	Apps	Goals
Atlético Madrid B	2020–21	Segunda División B	15	4	—		—		—		15	4
Atlético Madrid B	2021–22	Tercera División RFEF	36	25	—		—		—		36	25
Atlético Madrid B	Total		51	29	—		—		—		51	29
Atlético Madrid	2021–22	La Liga	1	0	0	0	0	0	0	0	1	0
Atlético Madrid	2024–25	La Liga	33	2	5	2	9 (Note: Appearances in UEFA Champions League)	1	3 (Note: Appearances in FIFA Club World Cup)	0	50	5
Atlético Madrid	2025–26	La Liga	31	4	6	1	15	2	1 (Note: Appearance in Supercopa de España)	0	53	7
Atlético Madrid	2026–27	La Liga	13	4	0	0	4	0	0	0	17	4
Atlético Madrid	Total		78	10	11	3	28	3	4	0	121	16
Zaragoza (loan)	2022–23	Segunda División	36	9	1	0	—		—		37	9
Alavés (loan)	2023–24	La Liga	14	1	2	0	—		—		16	1
Career total			179	47	14	3	28	3	4	0	225	53

=== International ===
As of match played 3 October 2026

Appearances and goals by national team and year
National team	Year	Apps	Goals
Argentina	2024	1	0
Argentina	2025	8	1
Argentina	2026	8	2
Total		17	3

As of match played 3 October 2026
Scores and results list Argentina's goal tally first, score column indicates score after each Simeone goal.

List of international goals scored by Giuliano Simeone
No.	Date	Venue	Cap	Opponent	Score	Result	Competition
1	25 March 2025	Estadio Monumental, Buenos Aires, Argentina	3	Brazil	4–1	4–1	2026 FIFA World Cup qualification
2	6 June 2026	Kyle Field, College Station, United States	12	Honduras	2–0	2–0	Friendly
3	3 October 2026	Estadio Monumental, Buenos Aires, Argentina	17	Burkina Faso	7–0	7–0	Friendly

== Honours ==
Atlético Madrid

- Copa del Rey runner-up: 2025–26

Argentina

- FIFA World Cup runner-up: 2026
