= Antonio Gomis =

Spanish footballer (born 2003)

Personal information
- Full name: Antonio Gomis Alemañ
- Date of birth: 20 May 2003 (age 23)
- Place of birth: Elche, Spain
- Height: 1.86 m (6 ft 1 in)
- Position: Goalkeeper

Team information
- Current team: Vizela
- Number: 1

Youth career
- 2008–2011: CF Celtic Elche
- 2011–2017: Elche
- 2017–2018: Real Madrid
- 2018–2019: Almería
- 2019–2021: Atlético Madrid

Senior career*
Years	Team	Apps	(Gls)
2021–2025	Atlético Madrid B	52	(0)
2023–2025	Atlético Madrid	1	(0)
2025–	Vizela	33	(0)
- * Club domestic league appearances and goals as of 19 May 2026

Antonio Gomis Alemañ (born 20 May 2003) is a Spanish footballer who plays as a goalkeeper for Liga Portugal 2 club Vizela.

== Club career ==
Gomis is a youth product of CF Celtic Elche, Elche, Real Madrid, and Almería before moving to the youth academy of Atlético Madrid in July 2019. He was promoted to Atlético Madrid B for the 2021–22 season in the Tercera Federación, and helped the team earn promotion to the Segunda Federación that season. On 17 December 2021, he signed his first professional contract with the club for 4 seasons. He was part of Atlético Madrid's preseason squad in the summer of 2022, and made his unofficial senior debut with them in a friendly with CD Numancia in July 2022 where he was brought on as an outfielder as an emergency replacement. He made his senior and professional debut with Atlético Madrid as a late substitute in a 2–2 La Liga tie with Villarreal on 4 June 2023.

On 26 June 2025, Gomis signed a two-year contract with Vizela in Portuguese second tier.

== International career ==
Gomis was called up to the Spain U19s for a set of trainings in January 2022.

== Career statistics ==
As of match played 14 April 2024

Appearances and goals by club, season and competition
Club	Season	League			National cup		Continental		Other		Total	
Club	Season	Division	Apps	Goals	Apps	Goals	Apps	Goals	Apps	Goals	Apps	Goals
Atlético Madrid B	2021–22	Tercera División	28	0	—		—		—		28	0
Atlético Madrid B	2022–23	Segunda Federación	15	0	—		—		0	0	15	0
Atlético Madrid B	2023–24	Primera Federación	6	0	—		—		—		6	0
Atlético Madrid B	Total		49	0	—		–		0	0	49	0
Atlético Madrid	2021–22	La Liga	0	0	0	0	0	0	—		0	0
Atlético Madrid	2022–23	La Liga	1	0	0	0	0	0	—		1	0
Atlético Madrid	2023–24	La Liga	0	0	0	0	0	0	0	0	0	0
Atlético Madrid	Total		1	0	0	0	0	0	0	0	1	0
Career total			50	0	0	0	0	0	0	0	50	0
