= Amaro da Cavada =

Portuguese footballer

Personal information
- Full name: Amaro Lopes
- Date of birth: 1925
- Place of birth: Paços de Ferreira, Portugal
- Date of death: 1992 (aged 66–67)
- Place of death: Mâcon, France
- Height: 1.75 m (5 ft 9 in)
- Position: Centre back

Senior career*
Years	Team	Apps	(Gls)
1951–1957	Paços de Ferreira		
- * Club domestic league appearances and goals

Amaro Lopes, known as Amaro da Cavada, (1925–1992) was a Portuguese footballer.

== Early life ==
He was known as Amaro da Cavada, in reference to the Cavada region in Portugal, where he was from.

== Club career ==
He began playing for Paços de Ferreira during the 1951-52 season. In 1957, he ended his playing career, emigrating to France to flee Portugal under the dictatorship of António de Oliveira Salazar, picking up a job in the construction industry.

== Personal ==
In France, he settled in Mâcon. In Mâcon, a local football club, Sporting Mâcon, which was founded by the Portuguese community in the town, together with the Mâcon Portuguese Association, hosts an annual futsal tournament hosts known as the Challenge Amaro Lopes, in honour of his importance to the community as after his arrival to the town, he was an important figure in the community, helping other Portuguese families immigrate to the area and helping find job and housing opportunities for the newcomers.

Lopes was the grandfather of French footballer Antoine Griezmann.
