= Antoine Griezmann: The Making of a Legend =

2019 documentary film by Alex Dell

- Film poster
- Directed by: Alex Dell
- Distributed by: Netflix
- Release date: March 21, 2019
- Running time: 60 minutes

Antoine Griezmann: The Making of a Legend is a 2019 documentary film directed by Alex Dell, following Antoine Griezmann's path from Real Sociedad in Spain, to Atletico Madrid, and all the way to winning the FIFA World Cup with France in 2018. It was released on Netflix on March 21, 2019.

== Premise ==
Antoine Griezmann: The Making of a Legend covers modern professional football through archival footage and interviews with Antoine and his father. The documentary shows his career up to his signing with Atlético Madrid.

== Release ==
The documentary was released on March 21, 2019 on Netflix streaming but was removed in March 2023.
