= Antoine Griezmann =

French footballer (born 1991)

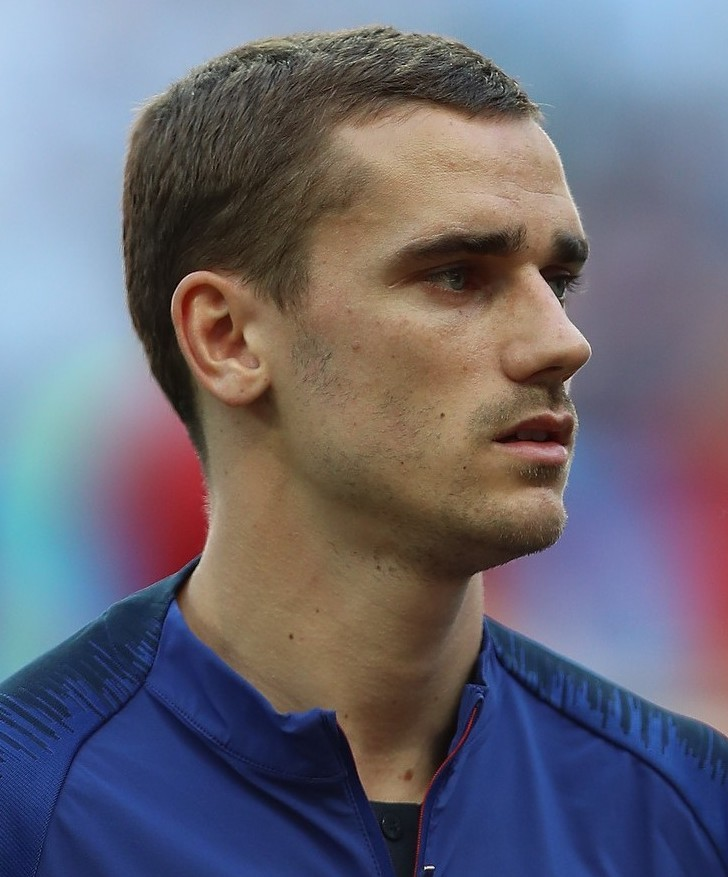
- Griezmann with France at the 2018 FIFA World Cup

Personal information
- Full name: Antoine Griezmann
- Date of birth: 21 March 1991 (age 35)
- Place of birth: Mâcon, France
- Height: 1.76 m (5 ft 9 in)
- Positions: Forward; attacking midfielder

Team information
- Current team: Orlando City
- Number: 7

Youth career
- 1997–1999: Entente Charnay et Mâcon 71
- 1999–2005: Mâcon
- 2005–2009: Real Sociedad

Senior career*
Years	Team	Apps	(Gls)
2009–2014	Real Sociedad	180	(46)
2014–2019	Atlético Madrid	180	(94)
2019–2022	Barcelona	74	(22)
2021–2022	→ Atlético Madrid (loan)	34	(5)
2022–2026	Atlético Madrid	135	(44)
2026–	Orlando City	18	(14)

International career
2010	France U19	7	(3)
2011	France U20	8	(1)
2010–2012	France U21	10	(3)
2014–2024	France	137	(44)
Medal record
Men's football
Representing France
FIFA World Cup
Winner	2018 Russia
Runner-up	2022 Qatar
UEFA European Championship
Runner-up	2016 France
Third place	2024 Germany
UEFA Nations League
Winner	2021 Italy
UEFA European Under-19 Championship
Winner	2010 France
- * Club domestic league appearances and goals as of 23:06, 7 November 2026 (UTC)

Antoine Griezmann (French pronunciation: [ɑ̃twan ɡʁijɛzman]; born 21 March 1991) is a French professional footballer who plays as a forward or attacking midfielder for Major League Soccer club Orlando City. Considered to be one of the best players of his generation, he is primarily known for his versatility, game intelligence, attacking output, and off-ball attributes.

Griezmann began his senior club career with Spanish side Real Sociedad in 2009, where he had previously been a youth graduate, and won the Segunda División in his first season. In 2014, he joined Atlético Madrid for a then-club record €30 million. In his second season, he was awarded La Liga Best Player and was integral to Atlético reaching the UEFA Champions League final, eventually finishing in third place for both the Ballon d'Or and Best FIFA Men's Player. Two years later, he won the UEFA Europa League and was named the competition's Player of the Season.

In 2019, after several years of speculation, he departed Atlético for Barcelona in a transfer worth €120 million, making him one of the most expensive players of all time. Despite winning his first major domestic title, the Copa del Rey in 2021, Griezmann experienced a decline in form. Ahead of 2021–2022, he returned to Atlético and became the club's all-time top goalscorer in early 2024. In his final season, Griezmann recorded his 200th goal and his 100th assist for Atlético, and scored five goals in six games to help the club reach the Copa del Rey final, which they lost. After 17 years in Spain, Griezmann relocated to the United States to join Orlando City.

Griezmann won the 2010 UEFA European Under-19 Championship with France and made his senior debut in 2014. He went on to earn 137 caps and score 44 goals, ranking as France's third-most capped player and fourth-highest goalscorer as well as the leading assist provider. Griezmann was the top goalscorer and named Player of the Tournament as hosts France finished runners-up at UEFA Euro 2016. He then won the Silver Boot, the Bronze Ball, and was named man of the match in the final as France won the 2018 FIFA World Cup. At the 2022 World Cup, Griezmann played as an attacking midfielder as France finished runners-up. He retired from international football in 2024.

== Early life ==
Antoine Griezmann was born on 21 March 1991 in the commune of Mâcon in the department of Saône-et-Loire. His father, Alain Griezmann, a town councillor, has distant German and Luxembourgish ancestry. The German ancestor, the father's great-great-grandfather, named Emmerich Grieszmann, migrated to France from Münster in the early 19th century. He was a basket maker who had married Maria Haas from Kehlen, Luxembourg. The family surname was originally spelled "Grieszmann", before being changed to "Griezmann". Griezmann's mother, Isabelle Lopes, a former hospital cleaning supervisor, is of Portuguese descent, and her father Amaro Lopes was a Portuguese footballer for Paços de Ferreira. Amaro Lopes moved from Portugal to France with his wife Carolina to work in construction in 1957, where Isabelle was born, and he died in 1992 when his grandson was an infant. As a child, Griezmann often spent his holidays in Paços de Ferreira, Portugal.

Griezmann began his career playing for hometown club UF Mâconnais. While there, he embarked on several trials with professional clubs, including Lyon, the club he supported as a child, to earn a spot in one of their youth academies, but was rejected because clubs questioned his small frame. In 2005, while on trial with Montpellier, Griezmann played in a friendly match against the youth academy of Paris Saint-Germain in Paris, and impressed several clubs, notably Spanish club Real Sociedad, whose French scout Éric Olhats was attending the event. Following the match, Olhats offered Griezmann a one-week trial in San Sebastián, which he accepted. He was later offered a second-week stay at the club. The club then contacted his parents and formally offered the player a youth contract. Griezmann's parents were initially reluctant to have their son move to Spain, but allowed him to make the move after positive reassurances.

== Club career ==
=== Real Sociedad ===
==== Early career ====
When he first arrived at Real Sociedad, Griezmann lodged with the club's French scout while attending school across the border in Bayonne, training in the evenings at the club's headquarters in San Sebastián. It took him time to break into Real Sociedad's first team, but after four years in the club's youth system he made his debut, called up by Martín Lasarte for Real Sociedad's 2009–10 pre-season campaign. In the pre-season, he scored five goals in four appearances and an injury to the team's regular left-winger led to Lasarte selecting him for the start of the season (unusually for a youth graduate, bypassing the reserve team altogether).

==== 2009–2011: Development and breakthrough ====
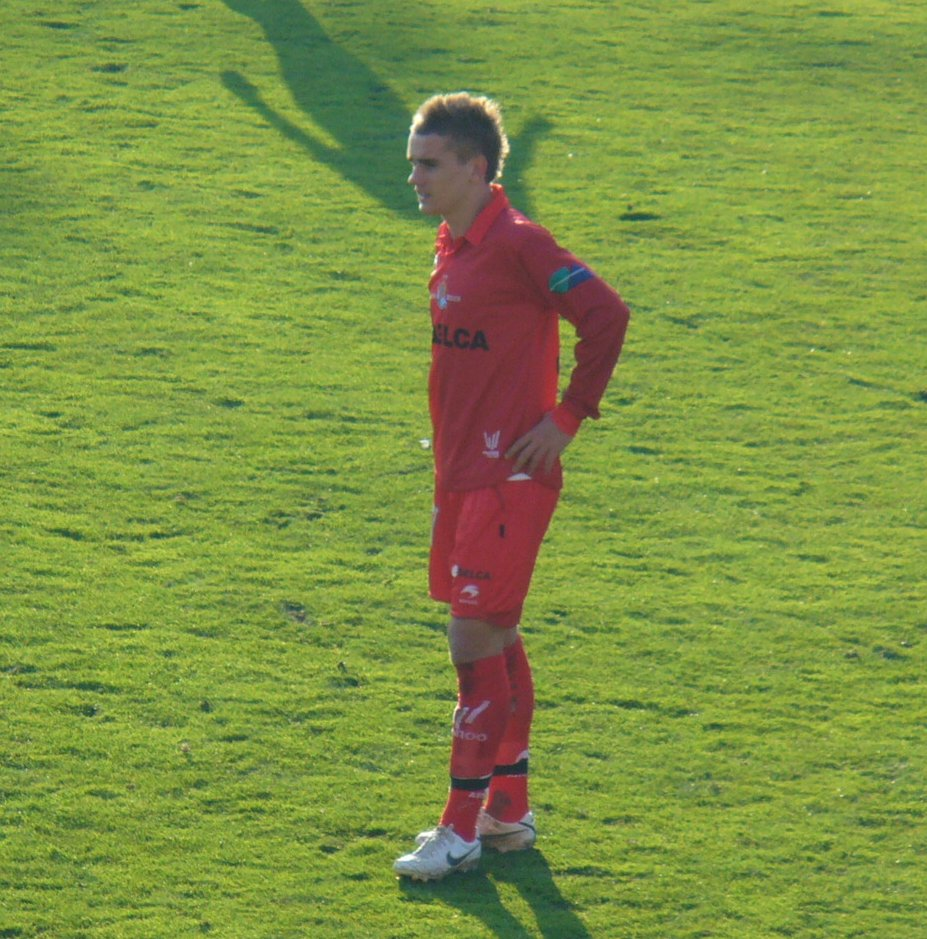
Griezmann playing for Real Sociedad in 2010

On 2 September 2009, Griezmann made his competitive debut in the team's Copa del Rey match against Rayo Vallecano appearing as a substitute in the 77th minute of a 2–0 defeat. Four days later, he made his league debut appearing as a substitute against Real Murcia. On 27 September, he made his first professional start and also scored his first professional goal against Huesca in a 2–0 win. Two weeks later, Griezmann scored his second goal of the campaign in a 2–0 win over Salamanca. In November 2009, he scored goals in back-to-back matches against Hércules and Recreativo de Huelva. The goal against the latter club was the only goal of the match. Griezmann appeared consistently in the team for the rest of the season, scoring two more goals in wins over Cádiz and Numancia as Real Sociedad earned promotion to La Liga for the 2010–11 season as league winners. On 8 April 2010, Griezmann signed his first professional contract agreeing to a five-year deal with the club until 2015 with a release clause of €30 million. Prior to signing the contract, he drew considerable interest from Ligue 1 clubs Lyon, Saint-Étienne and Auxerre. As he developed with a Basque club, he was also potentially available to play for local rivals Athletic Bilbao, in spite of being born and growing up in the non-Basque areas of France.

Griezmann made his debut in La Liga on 29 August 2010, in the season's first match. In a post-game interview, he described the occasion as "fulfilling his childhood dream". In the team's first match after the September international break, Griezmann assisted on the equalising goal scored by Raúl Tamudo against Real Madrid. Madrid later won the match 2–1 following a goal from Cristiano Ronaldo. On 25 October, Griezmann scored his first goal in the league in a 3–0 victory over Deportivo La Coruña. He celebrated the goal by pretending to drive a truck that was parked near the field. A week later, Griezmann scored the opening goal in a 2–1 win over Málaga. In November 2010, Griezmann scored the only goal in the team's 2–1 loss to Hércules. In the team's second match of the new year, he netted the second goal in the team's 4–0 victory over Getafe. After going scoreless in the next nine matches, Griezmann returned to his scoring form in March, scoring the only goal for Sociedad in the team's 2–1 defeat to Racing Santander.

==== 2011–2014: Individual success ====
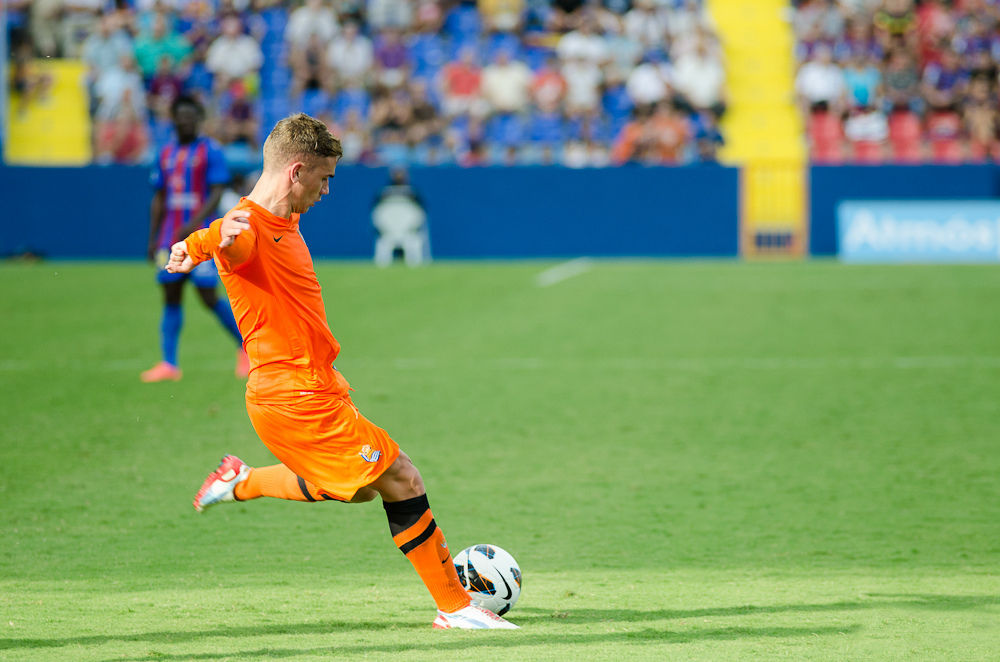
Griezmann playing for Real Sociedad in 2012

After sitting out the first league match of the 2011–12 campaign, in Griezmann's first competitive match of the season against the defending champions Barcelona two weeks later, he scored the equalising goal in a 2–2 draw.

In the final league game of the 2012–13 campaign, he scored the only goal of the game against Deportivo La Coruña, securing qualification for the UEFA Champions League for the first time since 2003–04 while also relegating Deportivo.

At the start of the following season, Griezmann scored on a volley against Lyon in his home nation of France which helped Real Sociedad qualify for the Champions League group stage (4–0 on aggregate). Another important goal was also on a volley, this time against Athletic Bilbao in a Basque derby league match at Anoeta Stadium in January 2014 which ended in a 2–0 victory for Real.

=== Atlético Madrid ===
==== 2014–15: Debut season ====
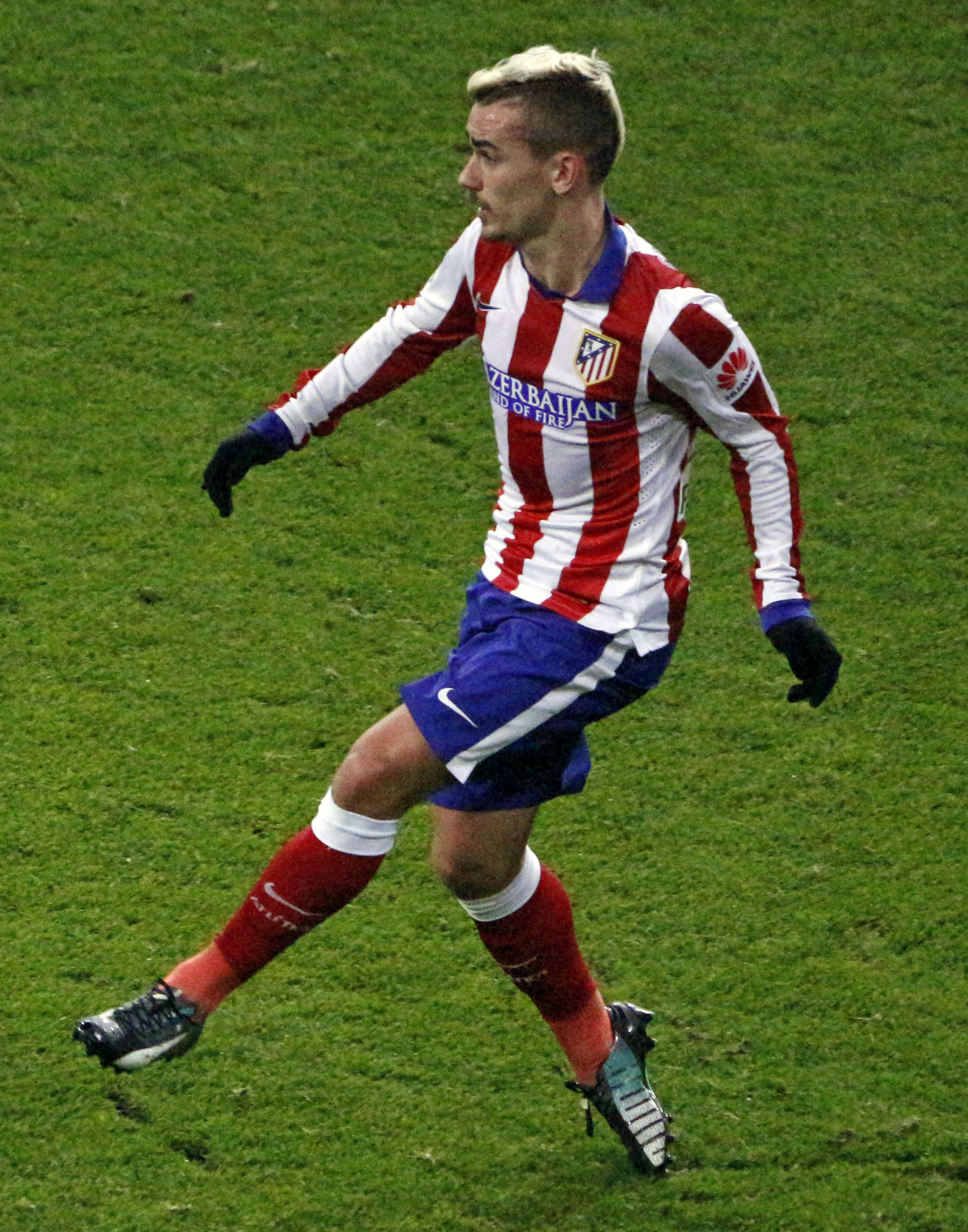
Griezmann playing for Atlético Madrid in 2015

On 28 July 2014, Atlético Madrid reached an agreement with Real Sociedad for the transfer of Griezmann, for a fee believed to be close to his €30 million (£24 million) buy-out clause. He passed the medical examination the same day and signed a six-year contract on 29 July. He made his debut in the first leg of the 2014 Supercopa de España on 19 August, a 1–1 draw away to Real Madrid, replacing Saúl after 57 minutes. On 17 September, he scored his first goal for the club, in a Champions League group stage match against Olympiacos, in a game which Atlético eventually lost 3–2. Griezmann netted a brace, his first league goals for the club, in a 4–2 win over Córdoba on 1 November. On 21 December 2014, he scored his first La Liga hat-trick as Atlético won 4–1 at Athletic Bilbao, having trailed at half-time. He was the La Liga Player of the Month for January 2015 despite appearing in only three of Atlético's five matches.

On 7 April 2015, Griezmann scored the second in a 2–0 home victory over Real Sociedad. Out of respect to his formative club, the celebrations were minimal. Two weeks later he scored a brace against Elche in a 3–0 home win, bringing him to a total of 22 goals in the league season, overtaking Karim Benzema for the highest total by a French player in a single Spanish top-division campaign. He finished the season with 22 goals in 37 games, and was selected as the only Atlético player and one of three forwards in the Team of the Year at the LFP Awards, alongside Cristiano Ronaldo and Lionel Messi.

==== 2015–2017: Rise to prominence ====
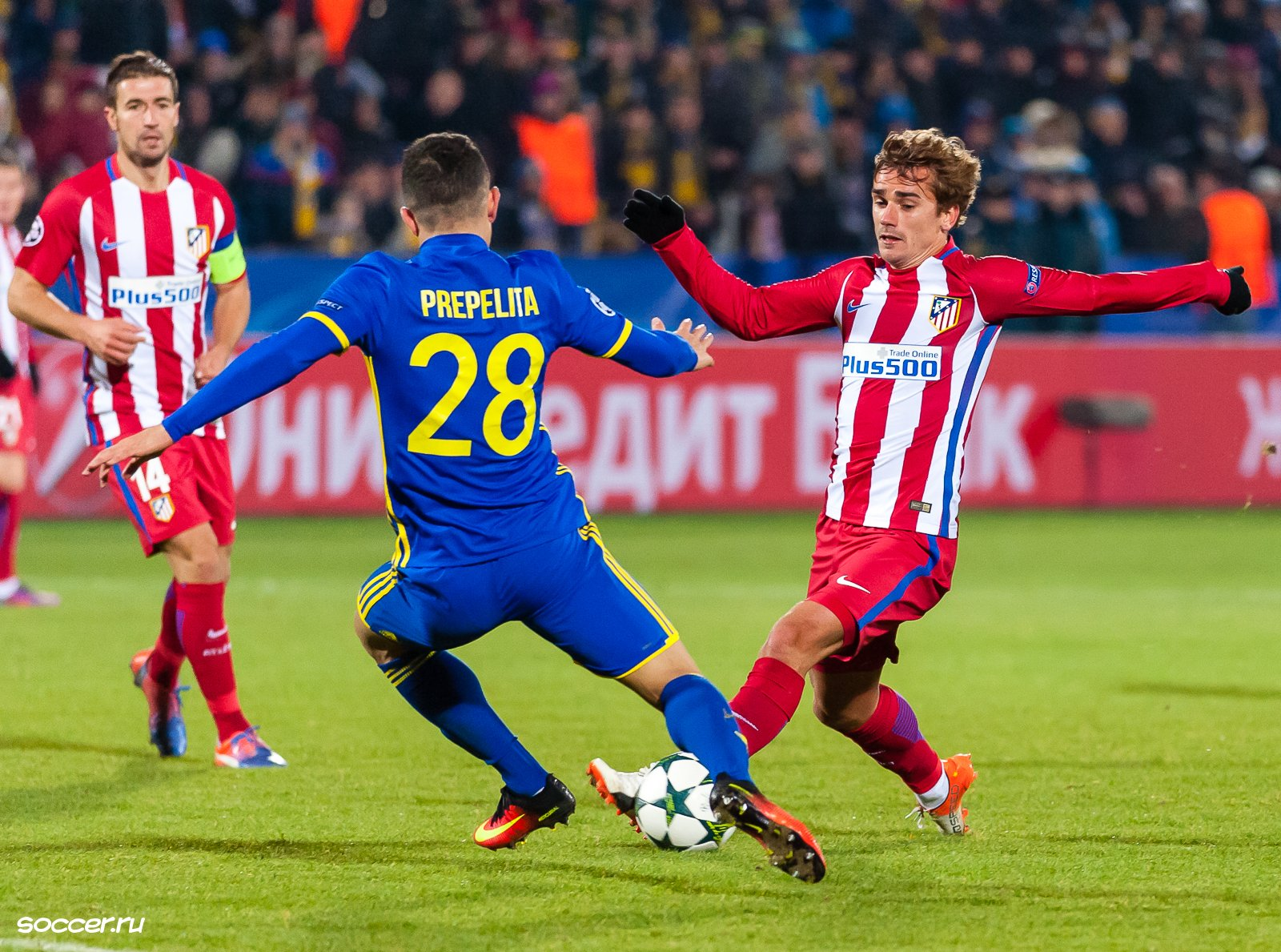
Griezmann (right) playing for Atlético Madrid against Rostov in 2016

On 22 August 2015, Griezmann scored the only goal as Atlético began the season with a home victory over promoted Las Palmas. He scored both of the goals on 15 September, as they won at Galatasaray in the Champions League group stage. A week later, he repeated the feat to defeat local neighbours Getafe and put Atlético on top of the league. On 18 October, in his return to Real Sociedad, Griezmann chipped goalkeeper Gerónimo Rulli in the ninth minute of a 2–0 away win (as in the fixture six months earlier, he did not celebrate the goal).

On 27 February 2016, Griezmann scored the only goal as Atlético won away to Real Madrid. On 13 April, he scored both goals in a 2–0 quarter-final second leg win at the Vicente Calderón Stadium that knocked holders Barcelona out of the Champions League. On 3 May, he scored the decisive away goal against Bayern Munich in the semi-final second leg at the Allianz Arena to send Atlético to the final. Griezmann hit the crossbar with a penalty two minutes into the second half with his team trailing 1–0 against Real Madrid in the Champions League final at San Siro on 28 May. He scored in the penalty shootout after the match had ended 1–1 after extra time, but Atlético ultimately lost 5–3.

On 23 June 2016, Griezmann signed a new contract with Atlético, which would keep him at the club until 2021. On 1 November 2016, Griezmann scored both of Atlético's goals (with his second in the 93rd minute) in their 2–1 home win against Rostov in a 2016–17 Champions League Group D match (in which he was voted the Player of the Match) to enable Atlético to progress to the round of 16 with two matches to spare. On 2 December 2016 Griezmann got third in the Ballon d'or ranking behind Lionel Messi and the winner Cristiano Ronaldo. On 22 April 2017, he scored the only goal of a win away to Espanyol, thus becoming the second Frenchman after Karim Benzema to score 100 La Liga goals, which he did in 247 games.

After another trophyless season, and amid speculation that he could leave Atlético for Manchester United after the conclusion of the 2016–17 season, he extended his contract at the club by one year in June 2017, after learning that Atlético was given a transfer ban and that it could not sign a replacement. His reported release price was also raised to €100 million (£87 million).

==== 2017–18: UEFA Europa League win ====
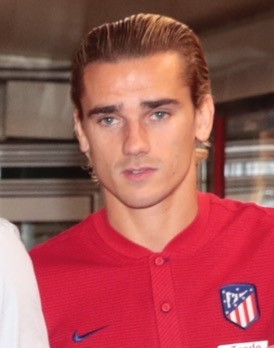
Griezmann with Atlético Madrid in 2017

On 19 August 2017, Griezmann earned his first red card during a draw against Girona and received a two-match ban. He was initially booked for diving in the penalty box, then his reaction of using foul language toward the referee earned him a second booking. He was named La Liga Player of the Month for February 2018 after registering eight goals and two assists during the period, including scoring seven in four days (a hat-trick against Sevilla and four against Leganés). His second in the 4–0 win against the latter was his 100th goal for Atlético, becoming only the third player of the 21st century to do so, after Sergio Agüero and Fernando Torres.

He scored in the first leg of the 2017–18 UEFA Europa League semi-final away to Arsenal and assisted Diego Costa for the only goal in the return, contributing to Atlético's 2–1 aggregate victory and progression to the final, held in Lyon and against French opposition in Marseille; he then scored twice in the final as his club claimed the trophy for the third time in nine years.

After months of speculation linking him with a move to Barcelona, which came after Atlético reported Barcelona to FIFA over an alleged illegal approach for Griezmann in December 2017, Griezmann signed a contract extension with Atlético on 19 June 2018 until 2023. This came days after he rejected a move to Barcelona. He wrote a message to Atlético on social media, "My fans, my team, MY HOME!!!" in Spanish, French and English along with a video in which he is seen walking around Madrid.

==== 2018–19: Final season of first stint with Atlético ====
On 15 August, Griezmann started in Atlético's 4–2 extra-time win over Real Madrid in the 2018 UEFA Super Cup in Tallinn. On Matchday 2 of the Champions League, Griezmann scored a goal in both halves to give his team a 3–1 home win over Belgian champions Club Brugge. Later on Matchday 4 he scored Atlético's second goal against German side Borussia Dortmund as Atlético Madrid won the reverse fixture at home by a 2–0 margin following a 4–0 defeat against the same opponents earlier in the competition at the Westfalenstadion. In the following game he again scored the second goal in a 2–0 win against French side Monaco, to ensure his team's qualification for the next round of the Champions League.

On 15 December, Griezmann played his 300th league contest in the Spanish top division, a game in which he scored twice while setting up another, as Atlético Madrid won 3–2 away to Real Valladolid. In the following week, he scored his 200th career goal, from the spot in a 1–0 win over Espanyol. On 26 January, in a league fixture at home against Getafe, he scored his 10th league goal of the season in a 2–0 win as Atlético closed the gap between league leaders Barcelona to just 2 points. On 10 February, he scored in a 3–1 derby defeat against Real Madrid, equalling Fernando Torres' record-which he later broke in the following week by scoring the only goal in a 1–0 win against Rayo Vallecano, to become the fifth highest goalscorer in Atlético history with 130 goals.

On 14 May 2019, Griezmann announced that he would be leaving Atlético Madrid after five seasons, after being heavily linked to Barcelona, who reportedly intended to pay the €120 million buy-out clause set by the club.

=== Barcelona ===
On 12 July 2019, Barcelona announced the signing of Griezmann to a five-year contract after activating his €120 million buy-out clause. Later that day, however, Atlético Madrid disputed Barcelona's deal to sign the player, stating that the fee paid falls €80 million short of his release clause, claiming that Griezmann had agreed to move to the Nou Camp before 1 July 2019, when his €200 million buy-out clause was lowered to €120 million. Atlético later stated they have "started the procedures it considers appropriate for the defense of its legitimate rights and interests" as a result of any deal, with reports in Spanish media suggesting the club planned to go to football's governing body FIFA to argue their case. On 14 July, he was presented at the Camp Nou and was handed the number 17 shirt, and made his debut in a pre-season friendly in Japan against Chelsea. On the same day, some Atlético Madrid fans defaced Griezmann's plaque outside the Metropolitano Stadium, as the club officially submitted a complaint to La Liga, whose president Javier Tebas later stated "it is possible to block [Griezmann's] transfer", but also noted "La Liga have [yet] to decide [the] course of action". The transfer was eventually upheld.

==== 2019–2021: Copa del Rey ====
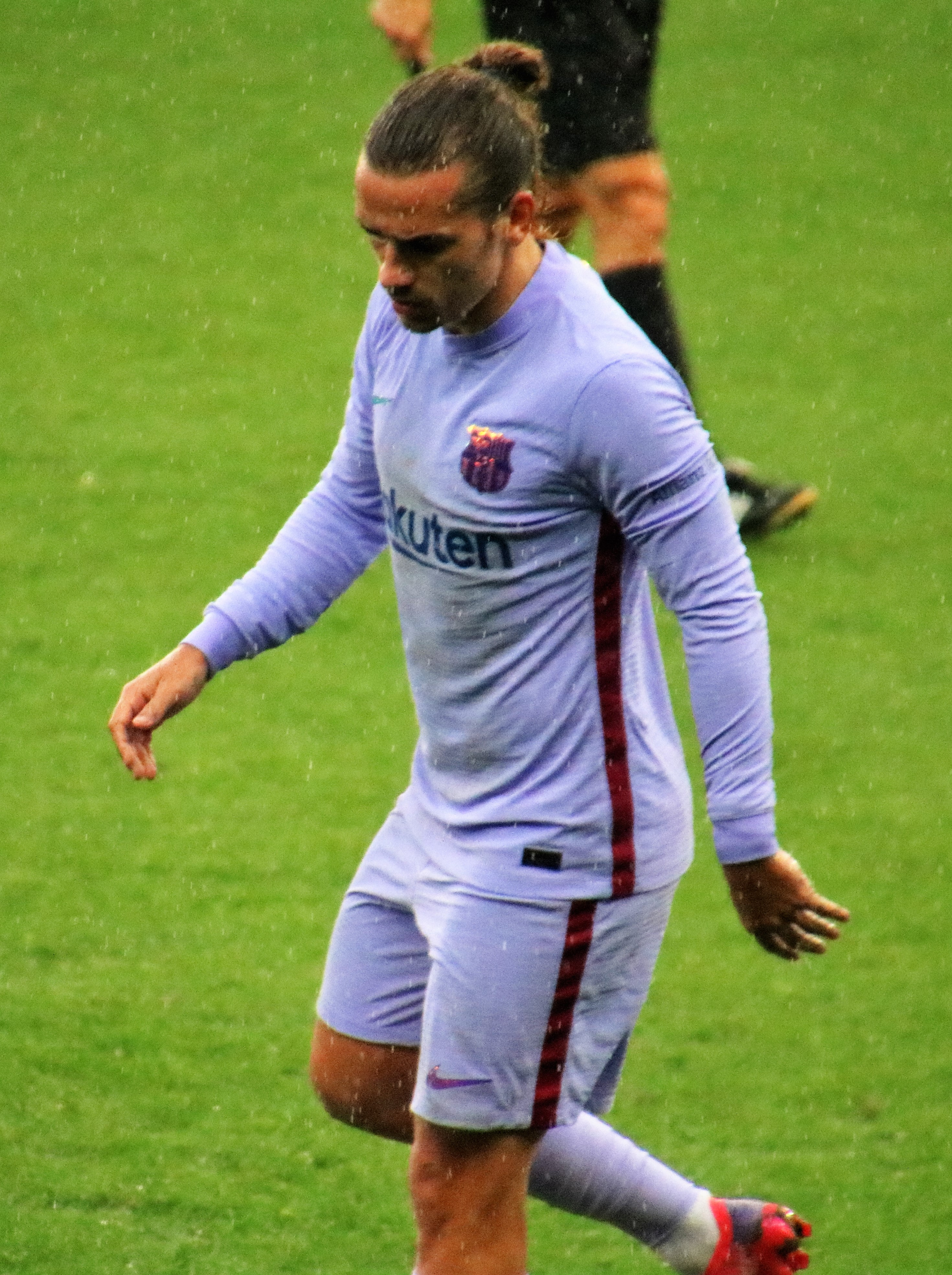
Griezmann playing for Barcelona in 2021

Griezmann made his debut for Barcelona on 16 August 2019 in a 1–0 defeat to Athletic Bilbao. On 25 August, Griezmann scored a brace and assisted during his home debut, which ended in a 5–2 win against Real Betis. After substituting injured Ousmane Dembélé after 26 minutes of the first half, he scored his first Champions League goal for the club on 27 November in a 3–1 win against Borussia Dortmund, assisted by Lionel Messi. In their 2019–20 Supercopa de España match against Atlético Madrid, Griezmann scored his side's second goal against his former club in an eventual 2–3 defeat. Griezmann became the first player of the season to score in every major competition for Barcelona when he netted a brace in the Copa del Rey against Ibiza in a narrow 2–1 win. On 25 February 2020, Griezmann scored Barcelona's equaliser in their 1–1 Champions League round of 16 draw against Napoli, becoming the first Barcelona player other than Messi to score a Champions League away goal in the knockout stage since 2015.

On 1 November 2020, Griezmann scored his first goal of the 2020–21 season in a 1–1 away draw against Alavés. On 17 January 2021, Griezmann scored a brace in a 3–2 loss against Athletic Bilbao in the 2021 Supercopa de España final. On 3 February, Griezmann scored and assisted twice as Barcelona made a comeback after being 2–0 down until the 88th minute to win 5–3 at the end of extra-time against Granada in the quarter-finals of the Copa del Rey. In the 2021 Copa del Rey final, Griezmann scored the first goal in a 4–0 victory over Athletic Bilbao and won his first trophy with Barcelona.

=== Return to Atlético Madrid ===
==== 2021–2023: Initial loan and La Liga's top assist provider ====
On 31 August 2021, Griezmann returned to Atlético Madrid on a one-year loan, with the option to extend the loan by a further year, and complete with a conditional permanent transfer clause worth €40 million to be activated by 2023. He scored his first goal in his second spell at the club on 28 September, in a 2–1 comeback victory away to AC Milan in the 2021–22 UEFA Champions League. On 19 October, in a Champions League group match against Liverpool at the Metropolitano Stadium, he scored a first half brace to level the score at 2–2, but was sent off in the 52nd minute for serious foul play on Roberto Firmino in an eventual 3–2 defeat.

At the start of the 2022–23 season, Atlético Madrid extended Griezmann's loan for a further year. Since the club did not want to trigger the appearance-based €40 million obligatory buy clause included in the loan deal, his game time became limited to thirty minutes per match. On 7 September 2022, he scored a 90+11th-minute winning goal in a 2–1 victory over Porto in the group stage of the 2022–23 UEFA Champions League. On 10 October 2022, Atlético reached an agreement with Barcelona over the transfer of Griezmann for a reported fee of €20 million, who signed a contract until 30 June 2026. He went on to record sixteen goals and eighteen assists across all competitions in the 2022–23 season, making him Atlético's top scorer, La Liga's best assist provider, and the only player in La Liga with double numbers for goals and assists. Griezmann was tied with Kevin De Bruyne and Lionel Messi for the most league assists in Europe's five major leagues.

==== 2023–2026: All-time Atlético top goalscorer ====
On 19 December 2023, Griezmann scored twice in a 3–3 draw with Getafe in La Liga. The strikes took him to 173 goals for Atlético Madrid, equalling the record held by club legend Luis Aragonés. On 10 January 2024, he became Atlético's all-time leading scorer with a goal against Real Madrid at the Al-Awwal Park in the 2023–24 Supercopa de España. Later that year, on 26 November, he scored a goal in his 100th Champions League match in a 6–0 away victory over Sparta Prague. On 29 March 2025, Griezmann overtook Lionel Messi and became the foreign player with the most La Liga appearances, having made his 521st in a match away at Espanyol. On 2 June 2025, he extended his contract with the club until 2027.

On 27 September 2025, he scored his first goal of the 2025–26 season in stoppage time, ending his 22-match scoreless run, as Atlético Madrid defeated rivals Real Madrid 5–2, handing them their worst derby loss since November 1950. Three days later, he netted his 200th goal for the club in a 5–1 victory over Eintracht Frankfurt in the Champions League. On 17 May 2026, he recorded his 100th assist for the club in a 1–0 victory over Girona during his final home appearance at Metropolitano Stadium. He also reached his 500th matches with the club, becoming the fourth player to achieve this feat following Adelardo Rodríguez, Koke and Jan Oblak. Griezmann played his final match for Atlético on 24 May, a 5–1 away defeat to Villarreal.

=== Orlando City ===
Griezmann with Orlando City in 2026

On 24 March 2026, Major League Soccer club Orlando City announced the signing of Griezmann. He officially joined the team on 13 July, following the conclusion of the 2025–26 season with Atlético as a designated player and extending through the 2027–28 season, with a team option for another season. On 7 July, Griezmann was officially introduced as an Orlando City player in front of a select group of supporters and team officials at the campus of Full Sail University. Griezmann said during his introduction that, "Since I was 18 years old, my dream was to come to Major League Soccer", and that it "was important for me to arrive physically and mentally well, and that's why I made the move".

Griezmann made his debut on 22 July in a match against the San Jose Earthquakes, scoring once to help secure a 4–0 win. The goal, which was Griezmann's 300th career club goal, developed from Justin Ellis intercepting a poor pass and then passing it to Griezmann, who scored past Angus Gunn at the near post. Griezmann's performance during his debut saw him named to the Team of the Matchday. On 22 August, Griezmann scored his first brace for Orlando City, securing a 2–1 comeback win over Real Salt Lake and ending the team's four-match winless streak, and was named the Player of the Matchday for the performance. On 12 September, Griezmann scored for the fifth consecutive game for Orlando City in a 3–0 win over Toronto FC, breaking the team's record for the most consecutive games with a goal scored, and helping to extend Orlando City's unbeaten streak to five games. Griezmann scored two goals and provided an assist in a 4–1 win over D.C. United on 17 October, a feat which would see him named the Player of the Matchday for the second time in his career. Griezmann was named the MLS Player of the Month for October/November 2026. During that period, he scored six goals and made four assists across seven games for Orlando City, and helped push Orlando City into the MLS Cup playoffs. After the conclusion of the regular season, Griezmann was named the 2026 MLS Newcomer of the Year.

== International career ==
=== 2010–2012: Youth career ===
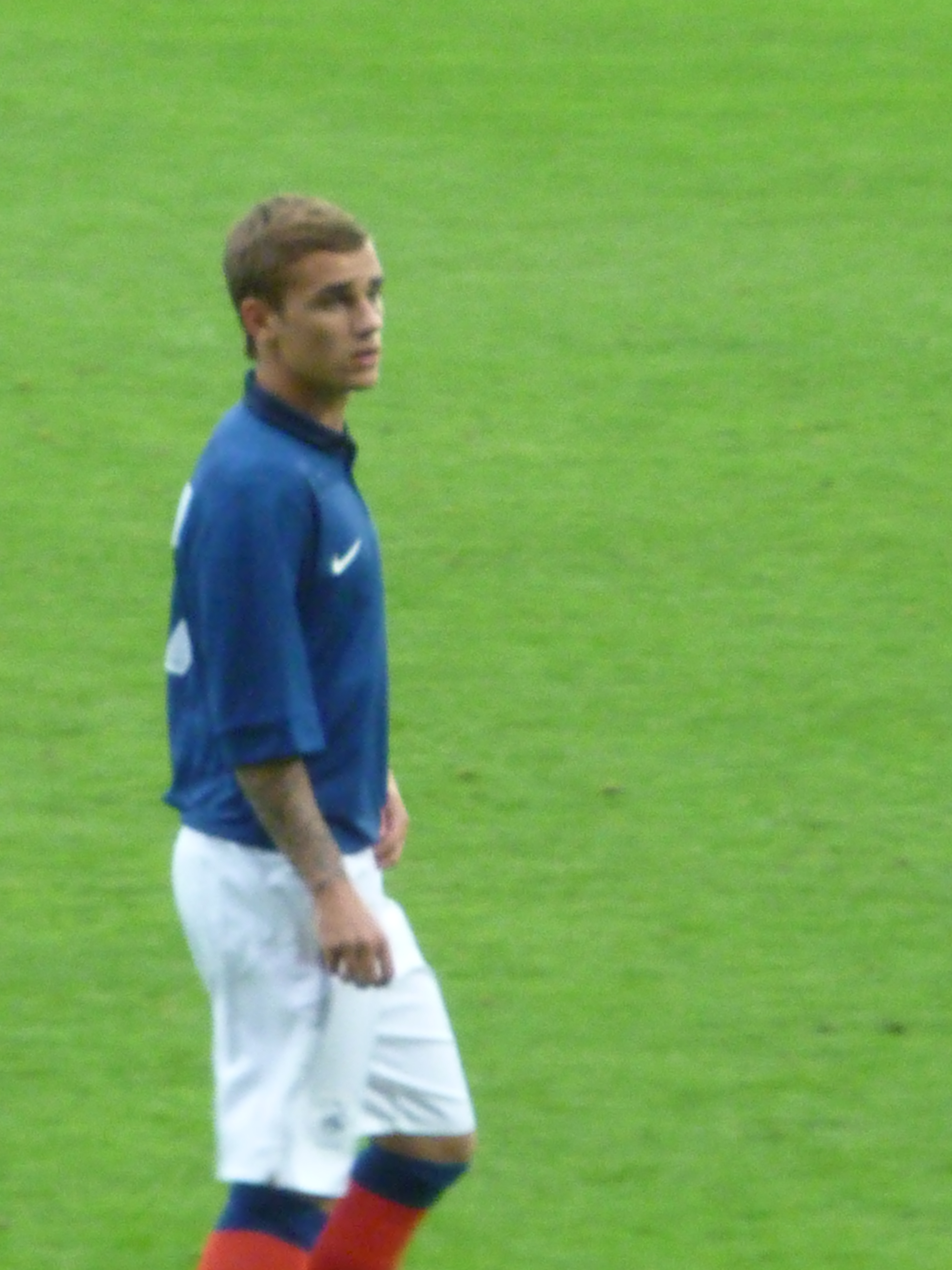
Griezmann playing for France U21s in 2011

Due to playing in Spain, Griezmann went unnoticed by several France youth international coaches. After his success with Real Sociedad, on 23 February 2010, he was named to the France under-19 team to play in two friendly matches against Ukraine. On 2 March, Griezmann made his youth international debut appearing in the team's 0–0 draw with Ukraine. In the return leg two days later, he scored the game-winning goal in the 88th minute to give France a 2–1 victory. On 7 June, Griezmann was named to coach Francis Smerecki's squad to participate in the 2010 UEFA European Under-19 Championship. In the tournament, he scored two goals and provided an assist in the team's second group stage match against Austria, a 5–0 win, as the national team eventually won the competition on home soil. He was named in the Team of the Tournament.

Due to France's victory at the UEFA Under-19 championship, the nation qualified for the 2011 FIFA U-20 World Cup, which merited under-20 team appearances for Griezmann. On 28 September 2010, he was called up to the team to participate in friendly matches against Portugal and the reserve team of Italian club Juventus. Griezmann, however, did not appear in either match due to being sent home early after suffering a thigh injury during a training session. The following month, despite still being eligible to appear at under-20 level, he was called up to the under-21 team by coach Erick Mombaerts as a replacement for the injured Gabriel Obertan to play in a friendly match against Russia. Griezmann made his under-21 debut in the match appearing as a second-half substitute in a 1–0 defeat.

After appearing in two matches with the under-21 team, Griezmann returned to under-20 level and made his debut with the team on 9 February 2011 in a 2–1 victory over England at the New Meadow, assisting Clément Grenier's equaliser. On 10 June 2011, he was named to the 21-man squad to participate in the U-20 World Cup. He made his debut in the competition on 30 July 2011 in the team's 4–1 defeat to the hosts Colombia. On 10 August, in France's Round of 16 match against Ecuador, Griezmann scored the game-winning goal in a 1–0 victory.

=== 2014–2016: Senior debut and Euro 2016 runner-up ===
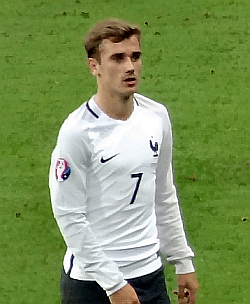
Griezmann playing for France at UEFA Euro 2016

On 27 February 2014, Griezmann received a call-up to France's senior squad by coach Didier Deschamps to play in a friendly against the Netherlands at the Stade de France. On 5 March, he debuted as a starter in the 2–0 home victory and playing the first 68 minutes. On 13 May, he was named in Deschamps' squad for the 2014 FIFA World Cup in Brazil. Against Paraguay in Nice on 1 June, he scored his first international goal for France, opening a 1–1 draw. He added two more as a late substitute for Olivier Giroud in France's final warm-up match, against Jamaica on 8 June, the final two in an 8–0 victory. On 15 June, he was selected to start in France's first match of the World Cup, replacing the injured Franck Ribéry on the left side of the team's attack as they defeated Honduras 3–0 in Porto Alegre. In the last 16 against Nigeria, his pressure led to Joseph Yobo scoring a late own goal for a 2–0 French victory. France were eliminated in the quarter-finals by eventual champions Germany.

Griezmann was chosen for France as they hosted UEFA Euro 2016, and started the opening game, a 2–1 win over Romania. For their performances, he and Paul Pogba were benched for the next game against Albania at the Stade Vélodrome; Griezmann came on in place of Giroud in the second half and headed Adil Rami's cross with the first shot on target in the last minute to open a 2–0 win. In the last 16 against the Republic of Ireland in Lyon, he scored twice as the French recovered from a half-time deficit to win 2–1, and was also fouled by Shane Duffy who was given a straight red card.

On 3 July, Griezmann assisted Pogba and Dimitri Payet before scoring himself in a 5–2 quarter-final win over Iceland; it was his first goal at the Stade de France. In the semi-finals against the country of his father's birth, Germany, he scored twice in a 2–0 victory to lead France to their third European Championship final. Following a 1–0 defeat to Portugal in the final on 10 July, Griezmann won the Golden Boot as the tournament's top scorer, with six goals and two assists in seven games, and was named the tournament's best player, also being named to the team of the tournament. His tally of six goals at the tournament was second only to the nine goals by compatriot Michel Platini at UEFA Euro 1984.

=== 2018–2021: FIFA World Cup triumph ===
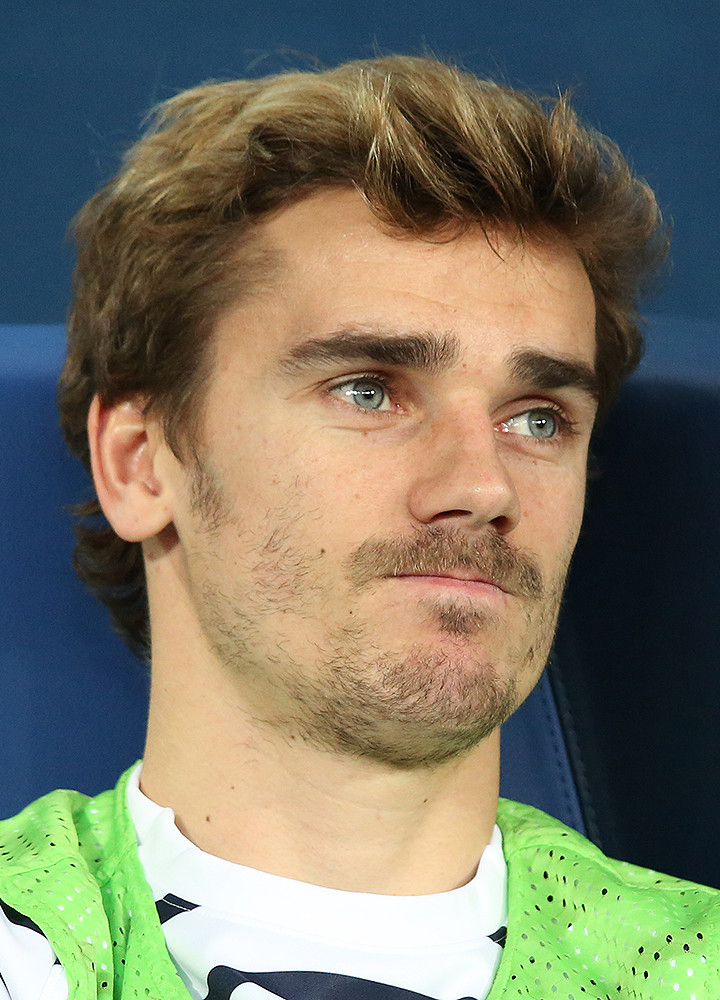
Griezmann with France in March 2018.

On 17 May 2018, Griezmann was named in the France squad for the 2018 FIFA World Cup in Russia. On 16 June 2018, he suffered a foul in the box and scored the resulting penalty kick to open the score in France's 2–1 over Australia in their opening match at the tournament, which was the first penalty decision ever to be awarded in a World Cup match with the assistance of the video assistant referee system. On 30 June, Griezmann scored a goal from the penalty kick given for a foul on Kylian Mbappé in a 4–3 victory over Argentina in their round of 16 match.

In France's 2–0 victory over Uruguay in quarter-finals of the tournament on 6 July, Griezmann first assisted Raphaël Varane's goal from a corner and later scored a goal himself with a strike from outside the area following an error by Uruguayan goalkeeper Fernando Muslera. Griezmann did not celebrate his goal against Uruguay out of respect for his Uruguayan mentor and Uruguayan club teammates. In the semi-final against Belgium at the Krestovsky Stadium, Saint Petersburg on 10 July, he set up the only goal of the game from a corner, which was headed in by Samuel Umtiti.

On 15 July, Griezmann was involved in several goals in the final against Croatia, which France won 4–2. With the score at 0–0 in the first half, France was awarded a foul on Griezmann after a challenge from Marcelo Brozović. Commentators called that Griezmann had dived as he began falling before Brozović made contact. Griezmann took the ensuing 30-yard (27 m) free kick, which was headed by Mario Mandžukić into his own net to give France the lead in the 18th minute. Croatia equalised, but Griezmann scored a 38th-minute penalty after the referee ruled for handball (via a video assistant review) to give France a 2–1 lead. In the second half, he passed to Paul Pogba in the build-up to the midfielder scoring the third goal for France. For his efforts, Griezmann was named man of the match, and was also voted the third best player in the tournament behind Luka Modrić and Eden Hazard, receiving the Bronze Ball.

=== 2021–2024: Nations League title and second consecutive World Cup final ===
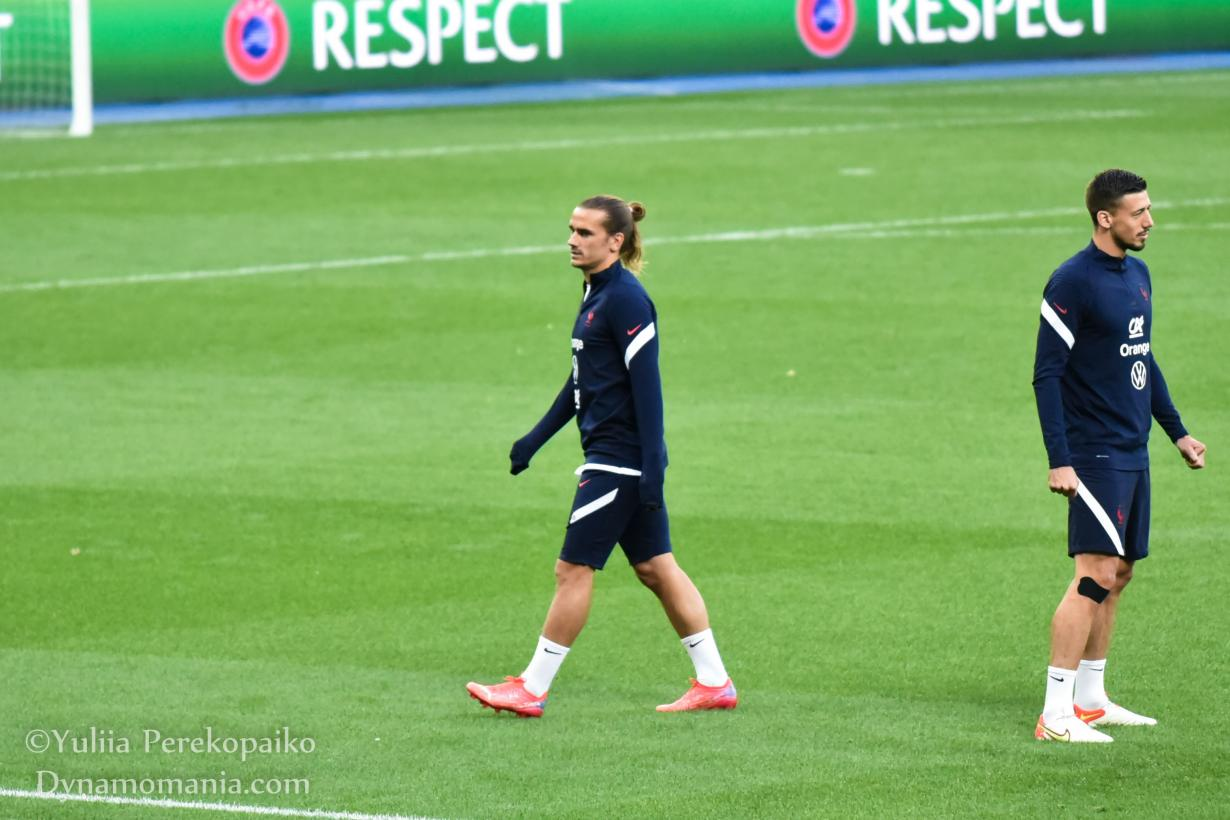
Griezmann in a pre-match training session with France in 2021

In May 2021, Griezmann received a call-up for the postponed UEFA Euro 2020. On 19 June, he scored a goal in a 1–1 draw against Hungary. They were eliminated from the tournament after losing to Switzerland in the round of 16 on penalties, following a 3–3 draw.

After, France topped their Nations League Group and qualified for the 2021 UEFA Nations League Finals, in the semi-final on 7 October, Griezmann managed to earn a penalty, which was converted by Kylian Mbappé to help France come from behind and defeat Belgium 3–2. Three days later, in the final, France defeated Spain 2–1 to clinch their first title.

In November 2022, he was included in the French squad for the 2022 FIFA World Cup in Qatar. On 26 November, Griezmann assisted Kylian Mbappé's winning goal in their 2–1 victory over Denmark, securing qualification to the knockout stages and thus breaking the "World Cup Champions' Curse". On 10 December, he assisted both of France's goals as they defeated England 2–1 in the quarter-finals. He was later named man of the match in a 2–0 semi-final win over Morocco. Although France lost to Argentina in the final on penalties after a 3–3 draw, Griezmann finished the tournament as the joint-top assister with three assists.

In March 2024, his record 84-game streak of consecutive appearances with France ended, having missed two friendly matches due to an ankle injury. Later that year, on 16 May, he was selected in the 25-man squad for UEFA Euro 2024.

Griezmann announced his retirement from international football on 30 September 2024.

== Player profile ==
=== Style of play ===
Griezmann is a versatile left-footed forward that's capable of playing several offensive positions, including as a main striker, in a central role as an attacking midfielder, as a second striker, as a false 9, or as a winger, on either flank. Known for his technical skills, vision, and ability to drop deep to link play between the midfield and main attacking line, he has frequently been described in the media as a team player. Despite his relatively small stature, Griezmann is proficient in air duels and accurate with headers. He is also noted as an accurate finisher from both inside and outside the penalty area/box.

In addition to his ability to score and create goals, he has also been praised for his work-rate, attacking movement, positional sense, defensive contribution and ability to interpret the game, which, combined with his pace, mobility and energy, enables him to make effective attacking runs to beat the defensive line. He has been noted by various sources as having a comparatively low rate of scoring from penalties. Since the 2022 World Cup, Griezmann has been used in a deeper role by France national team manager Deschamps, often playing as a central midfielder.

=== Reception ===
UEFA chief technical officer Ioan Lupescu, who led the panel of technical observers that named Griezmann as the best player of Euro 2016, said that he "works hard for his team and possesses technique, vision and quality finishing" and branded him "a threat in every game he played". While his club form for Barcelona remained sub-par, Griezmann's performances for the France national team prompted head coach Didier Deschamps to label him "one of the greatest players of all-time".

== Other ventures ==
=== Media and sponsorships ===
Griezmann had a sponsorship deal with German sportswear company Puma, and has appeared in commercials for the company. His 'Hotline Bling' goal celebration features in a 2016 Puma commercial. Puma unveiled Griezmann's own custom made football boots, PUMA Future 18.1 "Grizi", in December 2017.

Griezmann features in EA Sports' FIFA video game series: he appears on the cover of the French edition of FIFA 16 alongside global cover star Lionel Messi, having been selected for the role by public vote. Ahead of Euro 2016, Griezmann featured in advertisements for Beats Electronics headphones, alongside Harry Kane, Mario Götze and Cesc Fàbregas. He has a dance move named after him in the popular French novelty song "Logobitombo (Corde à sauter)".

In 2019, the documentary film Antoine Griezmann: The Making of a Legend, which depicted the player's career, was released.

Griezmann is a brand ambassador for Head & Shoulders shampoo and Gillette, and has featured in several football themed television commercials. In 2017 he became a global brand ambassador for Chinese technology company Huawei; however, in December 2020, Griezmann formally cut ties with the company, citing "strong suspicions that [Huawei] has contributed to the development of a 'Uighur alert' thanks to facial recognition software".

Griezmann became the brand ambassador for Yu-Gi-Oh! trading card games on 6 June 2021. Originally, a special card inspired by him would be released later the year. However, following the video where Griezmann was seen laughing at derogatory racial comments made by teammate Ousmane Dembélé that surfaced online in July 2021, Konami announced they had terminated Griezmann's contract as the brand ambassador.

In January 2025, Griezmann made a significant shift by partnering with the French brand Decathlon after 14 years with Puma.

=== Grizi Esport ===
In January 2020, Griezmann launched the esports organisation, Grizi Esport. The organisation has acquired Rainbow Six Siege, Fortnite, and FIFA players. On 11 October 2021, it was announced by Grizi Esport that the organisation would "Stop momentarily with all of their Esports-related activities." As of December 2025, the organisation has not posted an update regarding the future of Grizi Esport.

== Personal life ==
Griezmann is Catholic.

=== Marriage and family ===
Since 2011, Griezmann has been in a relationship with Erika Choperena, a Spanish native of the Basque Country. They got married on 15 June 2017. In April 2016, they had their first child, a daughter. The couple's second child, a boy, was born in April 2019. In April 2021, the couple had their third child, another daughter. All of the couple's children share a birthday that is 8 April until they welcomed their fourth child and second boy, Shai, on 15 June 2025.

Griezmann's father became the president of UF Mâconnais in 2020, the club for which Griezmann played in his youth. His sister was a survivor of the siege of the Bataclan theatre in the November 2015 Paris attacks, which took place as he was playing against Germany at the Stade de France, which was also site of an explosion in the same attacks.

=== Criticisms ===
On 17 December 2017, Griezmann caused controversy by sharing a photo of himself dressed as a Harlem Globetrotter on his social media accounts; the outfit included blackface and an afro wig. After severe criticism, Griezmann deleted the posts and made an apology.

In July 2021, video footage of Griezmann along with teammate Ousmane Dembélé circulated online, whereby he was seen laughing at derogatory racial comments made by Dembélé against the Japanese technicians in their hotel room. Griezmann apologised for the video on Twitter, but denied accusations of racism.

== Career statistics ==
=== Club ===
As of match played 19 November 2026

Appearances and goals by club, season and competition
Club	Season	League			National cup (Note: Includes Copa del Rey, U.S. Open Cup)		Continental		Other		Total	
Club	Season	Division	Apps	Goals	Apps	Goals	Apps	Goals	Apps	Goals	Apps	Goals
Real Sociedad	2009–10	Segunda División	39	6	1	0	—		—		40	6
Real Sociedad	2010–11	La Liga	37	7	2	0	—		—		39	7
Real Sociedad	2011–12	La Liga	35	7	3	1	—		—		38	8
Real Sociedad	2012–13	La Liga	34	10	1	1	—		—		35	11
Real Sociedad	2013–14	La Liga	35	16	7	3	8 (Note: Appearances in UEFA Champions League)	1	—		50	20
Real Sociedad	Total		180	46	14	5	8	1	—		202	52
Atlético Madrid	2014–15	La Liga	37	22	5	1	9	2	2 (Note: Appearance(s) in Supercopa de España)	0	53	25
Atlético Madrid	2015–16	La Liga	38	22	3	3	13	7	—		54	32
Atlético Madrid	2016–17	La Liga	36	16	5	4	12	6	—		53	26
Atlético Madrid	2017–18	La Liga	32	19	3	2	14 (Note: Six appearances and two goals in UEFA Champions League, eight appearances and six goals in UEFA Europa League)	8	—		49	29
Atlético Madrid	2018–19	La Liga	37	15	2	2	8	4	1 (Note: Appearance in UEFA Super Cup)	0	48	21
Atlético Madrid	Total		180	94	18	12	56	27	3	0	257	133
Barcelona	2019–20	La Liga	35	9	3	3	9	2	1	1	48	15
Barcelona	2020–21	La Liga	36	13	6	3	7	2	2	2	51	20
Barcelona	2021–22	La Liga	3	0	—		—		—		3	0
Barcelona	Total		74	22	9	6	16	4	3	3	102	35
Atlético Madrid (loan)	2021–22	La Liga	26	3	1	1	9	4	—		36	8
Atlético Madrid	2022–23 (Note: Part of this season was spent on loan from Barcelona)	La Liga	38	15	4	0	6	1	—		48	16
Atlético Madrid	2023–24	La Liga	33	16	4	1	10	6	1	1	48	24
Atlético Madrid	2024–25	La Liga	38	8	5	2	10	6	3 (Note: Appearances in FIFA Club World Cup)	1	56	17
Atlético Madrid	2025–26	La Liga	34	7	6	5	15	2	1	0	56	14
Atlético Madrid	Total		143	46	19	8	41	15	5	2	208	71
Orlando City	2026	Major League Soccer	18	14	1	0	—		4 (Note: Three appearances and one goal in Leagues Cup, one appearance in MLS Cup playoffs)	1	23	15
Career total			621	225	62	32	130	51	15	6	828	314

=== International ===
Appearances and goals by national team and year
National team	Year	Apps	Goals
France	2014	14	5
France	2015	10	1
France	2016	15	8
France	2017	10	5
France	2018	18	7
France	2019	11	4
France	2020	8	3
France	2021	16	9
France	2022	15	0
France	2023	10	2
France	2024	10	0
Total		137	44

Scores and results list France's goal tally first, score column indicates score after each Griezmann goal.

List of international goals scored by Antoine Griezmann
No.	Date	Venue	Cap	Opponent	Score	Result	Competition	Ref.
1	1 June 2014	Allianz Riviera, Nice, France	3	Paraguay	1–0	1–1	Friendly	
2	8 June 2014	Stade Pierre-Mauroy, Villeneuve-d'Ascq, France	4	Jamaica	7–0	8–0	Friendly	
3	8 June 2014	Stade Pierre-Mauroy, Villeneuve-d'Ascq, France	4	Jamaica	8–0	8–0	Friendly	
4	14 October 2014	Vazgen Sargsyan Republican Stadium, Yerevan, Armenia	12	Armenia	3–0	3–0	Friendly	
5	14 November 2014	Roazhon Park, Rennes, France	13	Albania	1–1	1–1	Friendly	
6	8 October 2015	Allianz Riviera, Nice, France	21	Armenia	1–0	4–0	Friendly	
7	25 March 2016	Amsterdam Arena, Amsterdam, Netherlands	25	Netherlands	1–0	3–2	Friendly	
8	15 June 2016	Stade Vélodrome, Marseille, France	29	Albania	1–0	2–0	UEFA Euro 2016	
9	26 June 2016	Parc Olympique Lyonnais, Décines-Charpieu, France	31	Republic of Ireland	1–1	2–1	UEFA Euro 2016	
10	26 June 2016	Parc Olympique Lyonnais, Décines-Charpieu, France	31	Republic of Ireland	2–1	2–1	UEFA Euro 2016	
11	3 July 2016	Stade de France, Saint-Denis, France	32	Iceland	4–0	5–2	UEFA Euro 2016	
12	7 July 2016	Stade Vélodrome, Marseille, France	33	Germany	1–0	2–0	UEFA Euro 2016	
13	7 July 2016	Stade Vélodrome, Marseille, France	33	Germany	2–0	2–0	UEFA Euro 2016	
14	7 October 2016	Stade de France, Saint-Denis, France	37	Bulgaria	3–1	4–1	2018 FIFA World Cup qualification	
15	25 March 2017	Stade Josy Barthel, Luxembourg City, Luxembourg	40	Luxembourg	2–1	3–1	2018 FIFA World Cup qualification	
16	2 June 2017	Roazhon Park, Rennes, France	42	Paraguay	5–0	5–0	Friendly	
17	31 August 2017	Stade de France, Saint-Denis, France	44	Netherlands	1–0	4–0	2018 FIFA World Cup qualification	
18	10 October 2017	Stade de France, Saint-Denis, France	47	Belarus	1–0	2–1	2018 FIFA World Cup qualification	
19	10 November 2017	Stade de France, Saint-Denis, France	48	Wales	1–0	2–0	Friendly	
20	1 June 2018	Allianz Riviera, Nice, France	53	Italy	2–0	3–1	Friendly	
21	16 June 2018	Kazan Arena, Kazan, Russia	55	Australia	1–0	2–1	2018 FIFA World Cup	
22	30 June 2018	Kazan Arena, Kazan, Russia	58	Argentina	1–0	4–3	2018 FIFA World Cup	
23	6 July 2018	Nizhny Novgorod Stadium, Nizhny Novgorod, Russia	59	Uruguay	2–0	2–0	2018 FIFA World Cup	
24	15 July 2018	Luzhniki Stadium, Moscow, Russia	61	Croatia	2–1	4–2	2018 FIFA World Cup	
25	16 October 2018	Stade de France, Saint-Denis, France	65	Germany	1–1	2–1	2018–19 UEFA Nations League A	
26	16 October 2018	Stade de France, Saint-Denis, France	65	Germany	2–1	2–1	2018–19 UEFA Nations League A	
27	22 March 2019	Zimbru Stadium, Chișinău, Moldova	68	Moldova	1–0	4–1	UEFA Euro 2020 qualification	
28	25 March 2019	Stade de France, Saint-Denis, France	69	Iceland	4–0	4–0	UEFA Euro 2020 qualification	
29	2 June 2019	Stade de la Beaujoire, Nantes, France	70	Bolivia	2–0	2–0	Friendly	
30	17 November 2019	Arena Kombëtare, Tirana, Albania	78	Albania	2–0	2–0	UEFA Euro 2020 qualification	
31	8 September 2020	Stade de France, Saint-Denis, France	80	Croatia	1–1	4–2	2020–21 UEFA Nations League A	
32	7 October 2020	Stade de France, Saint-Denis, France	81	Ukraine	7–1	7–1	Friendly	
33	14 October 2020	Stadion Maksimir, Zagreb, Croatia	83	Croatia	1–0	2–1	2020–21 UEFA Nations League A	
34	24 March 2021	Stade de France, Saint-Denis, France	87	Ukraine	1–0	1–1	2022 FIFA World Cup qualification	
35	31 March 2021	Stadion Grbavica, Sarajevo, Bosnia and Herzegovina	89	Bosnia and Herzegovina	1–0	1–0	2022 FIFA World Cup qualification	
36	2 June 2021	Allianz Riviera, Nice, France	90	Wales	2–0	3–0	Friendly	
37	8 June 2021	Stade de France, Saint-Denis, France	91	Bulgaria	1–0	3–0	Friendly	
38	19 June 2021	Puskás Aréna, Budapest, Hungary	93	Hungary	1–1	1–1	UEFA Euro 2020	
39	1 September 2021	Stade de la Meinau, Strasbourg, France	96	Bosnia and Herzegovina	1–1	1–1	2022 FIFA World Cup qualification	
40	7 September 2021	Parc Olympique Lyonnais, Décines-Charpieu, France	98	Finland	1–0	2–0	2022 FIFA World Cup qualification	
41	7 September 2021	Parc Olympique Lyonnais, Décines-Charpieu, France	98	Finland	2–0	2–0	2022 FIFA World Cup qualification	
42	13 November 2021	Parc des Princes, Paris, France	101	Kazakhstan	7–0	8–0	2022 FIFA World Cup qualification	
43	24 March 2023	Stade de France, Saint-Denis, France	118	Netherlands	1–0	4–0	UEFA Euro 2024 qualification	
44	12 September 2023	Signal Iduna Park, Dortmund, Germany	123	Germany	1–2	1–2	Friendly	

== Honours ==
Griezmann holding the FIFA World Cup Trophy in 2018

Real Sociedad

- Segunda División: 2009–10

Atlético Madrid

- Supercopa de España: 2014
- UEFA Europa League: 2017–18
- UEFA Super Cup: 2018
- Copa del Rey runner-up: 2025–26
- UEFA Champions League runner-up: 2015–16

Barcelona

- Copa del Rey: 2020–21
- Supercopa de España runner-up: 2021

France U19

- UEFA European Under-19 Championship: 2010

France

- FIFA World Cup: 2018; runner-up: 2022
- UEFA Nations League: 2020–21
- UEFA European Championship runner-up: 2016

Individual

- Ballon d'Or third place: 2016, 2018
- Onze d'Or: 2014–15
- Onze de Bronze: 2016–17
- La Liga Best Player: 2015–16
- La Liga Fan's Five-Star Player: 2015–16
- La Liga Player of the Month: January 2015, April 2015, September 2016, March 2017, February 2018, December 2018, March 2023, November 2023
- La Liga Team of the Season: 2014–15, 2022–23, 2023–24, 2024–25
- UEFA La Liga Team of the Season: 2015–16
- MLS Newcomer of the Year: 2026
- MLS Player of the Month: October/November 2026
- La Liga top assist provider: 2022–23
- UEFA Champions League Squad of the Season: 2015–16, 2016–17
- UEFA Europa League Squad of the Season: 2017–18
- UEFA Europa League Player of the Season: 2017–18
- UEFA European Championship Player of the Tournament: 2016
- UEFA European Championship Golden Boot: 2016
- UEFA European Championship Team of the Tournament: 2016
- UEFA European Under-19 Championship Team of the Tournament: 2010
- UEFA Team of the Year: 2016
- IFFHS Men's World Team: 2018
- French Player of the Year: 2016
- UNFP Best French Player Playing Abroad: 2016, 2024
- FIFA World Cup Bronze Ball: 2018
- FIFA World Cup Silver Boot: 2018
- FIFA World Cup Fantasy Team: 2018
- FIFA World Cup top assist provider: 2018, 2022

Orders

- Knight of the Legion of Honour: 2018
