= Éric Olhats =

French football scout

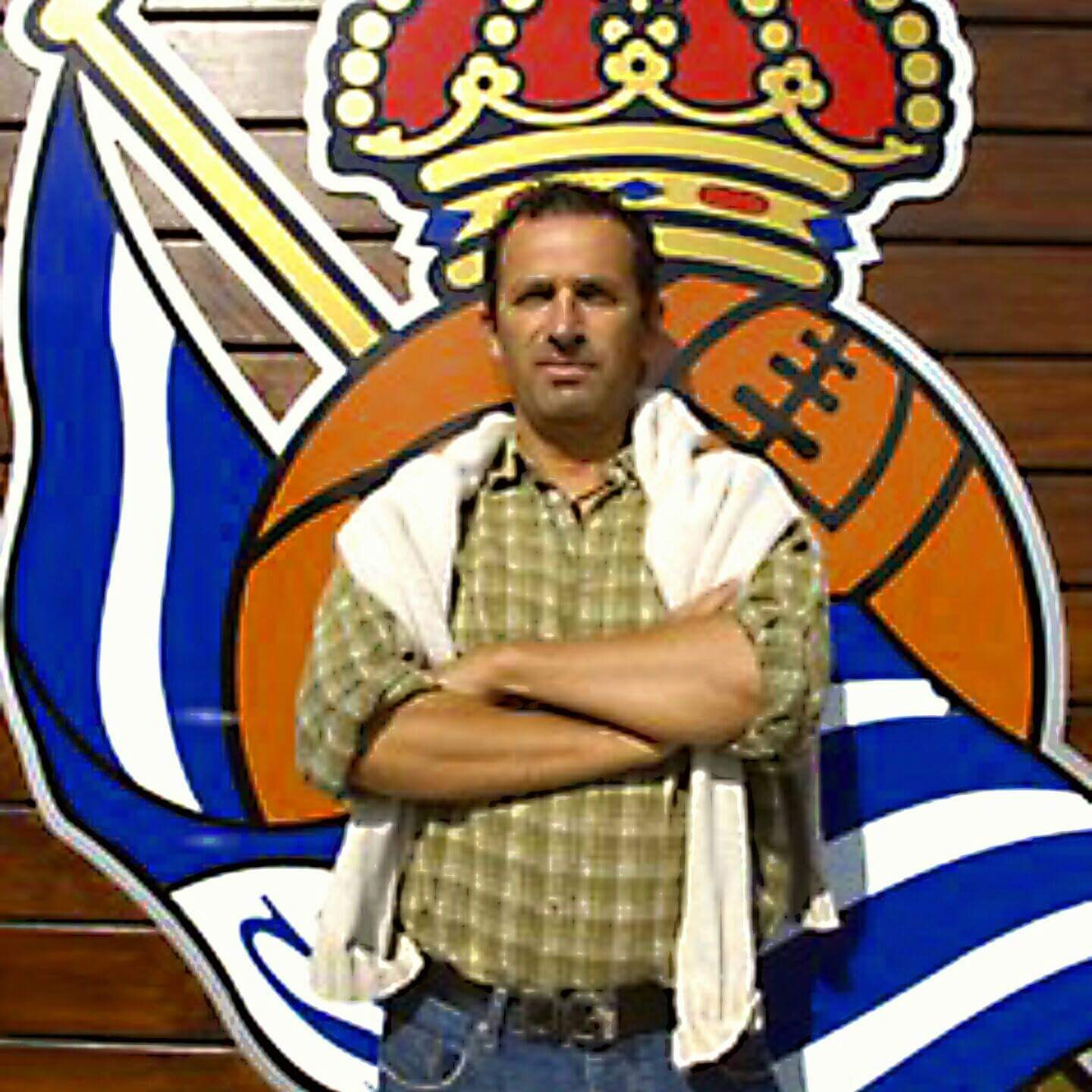
Olhats in 2016

Éric Olhats (born 1962) is a French football scout. He worked for La Liga clubs Real Sociedad (2003–2018) and Atlético Madrid (2018–2022), and scouted players including Antoine Griezmann.

Olhats was first convicted of child sexual abuse in 1991, but did not receive a criminal record. In 2025, he was sentenced to six years in prison for child sexual abuse.

== Career ==
Olhats was born in Hasparren and grew up in Bayonne, also in the department of Pyrénées-Atlantiques. He was the only child of a grocer father and beautician mother. After taking part in sports in his military training, he qualified as an instructor in 1983 and began coaching children at Les Genêts d'Anglet. In 1988 he moved to the youth teams of Pau FC, then in 1992 those of Aviron Bayonnais FC, where he became sporting director of the entire club.

In 2003, having forged a partnership between Aviron and Real Sociedad, based across the French–Spanish border in San Sebastián, Olhats became a scout for that club. He brought young French players to the club, starting with Giovanni Sio, and then Antoine Griezmann from UF Mâconnais. After Griezmann's departure to Atlético Madrid, Olhats remained as his agent until they fell out in 2017. In 2016, Olhats recruited Robin Le Normand, who had been released by Stade Brestois 29. Olhats's other French signings for Real Sociedad included Liassine Cadamuro, Kévin Rodrigues and Naïs Djouahra.

Olhats remained at Real Sociedad until July 2018, when he moved to Atlético Madrid as a scout on a five-year contract, and reunited with Griezmann. In the second half of the 2018–19 season, he worked for Stade Rennais FC in Ligue 1. He was dismissed by Atlético in May 2022, after being arrested and held on remand in France.

== Child sexual abuse cases ==
In 1990, Olhats worked at a summer camp in Soulac-sur-Mer and was accused of sexually assaulting two nine-year-old boys. He confessed, and on 31 January 1991 he was given a one-year suspended prison sentence that was not put on his criminal record.

Olhats was acquitted in October 2007, having been charged with sexually assaulting a boy at the camp in Soulac in 1989. The alleged victim testified that he was not entirely sure which coach had abused him.

In October 2009, Olhats was convicted in the first instance of child grooming, relating to a text message. He was given a three-month suspended sentence and banned from working with children for ten years. In September 2010, his sentence was overturned on appeal.

Olhats was arrested in May 2022 and held on remand for 11 months. In November 2025, he was found guilty of those charges; he was sentenced to six years in prison by a court in Bayonne, for sexual abuse of nine minors and grooming another, and was banned for life from working with children. The offences took place between 1997 and 2002, and 2021 to 2022.
