= Santiago Urkiaga =

Spanish footballer

Personal information
- Full name: Santiago Urkiaga Pérez
- Date of birth: 18 April 1958 (age 68)
- Place of birth: Barakaldo, Spain
- Height: 1.77 m (5 ft 10 in)
- Position: Right-back

Youth career
- 1970–1976: Athletic Bilbao

Senior career*
Years	Team	Apps	(Gls)
1976–1979	Bilbao Athletic	90	(1)
1979–1987	Athletic Bilbao	255	(3)
1987–1989	Español	46	(0)
Total		391	(4)

International career
1975–1976	Spain U18	5	(2)
1977	Spain U20	3	(0)
1978	Spain U21	2	(0)
1979–1980	Spain amateur	9	(0)
1980	Spain B	3	(0)
1980–1984	Spain	14	(0)

Managerial career
- 1991–1993: Santurtzi
- 1993–1994: Basconia
Medal record
Representing Spain
UEFA European Championship
Runner-up	1984 France
- * Club domestic league appearances and goals

Santiago Urkiaga Pérez (born 18 April 1958) is a Spanish former professional footballer who played as a right-back.

== Club career ==
Born in Barakaldo, Biscay, Urkiaga spent nine seasons of his career with local powerhouse Athletic Bilbao, being an ever-present fixture in the club's back-to-back La Liga conquests (1983–84) and starting in all the 67 games he appeared in during that timeframe. He made his debut in the competition on 13 May 1979, playing 26 minutes in a 4–0 away loss against Atlético Madrid, going on to total 345 official appearances with seven goals.

Urkiaga's final two seasons were spent with RCD Español where his former boss Javier Clemente was now the manager, helping the Catalan side to reach the final of the UEFA Cup in his first year, a penalty shootout loss to Germany's Bayer 04 Leverkusen. He retired in June 1989, at the age of 31.

== International career ==
Urkiaga earned 14 caps for the Spain national team in four years, and was included in the 1982 FIFA World Cup and UEFA Euro 1984 squads, being first-choice at the latter tournament as the nation finished second to hosts France. His first match occurred on 26 March 1980, in a 2–0 friendly defeat to England in Barcelona.

Urkiaga also competed at the 1980 Summer Olympics.

== Honours ==
Athletic Bilbao

- La Liga: 1982–83, 1983–84
- Copa del Rey: 1983–84
- Supercopa de España: 1984 (Athletic Bilbao were awarded the trophy as winners of the double)

Español

- UEFA Cup runner-up: 1987–88

Spain

- UEFA European Championship runner-up: 1984
