= Bayer 04 Leverkusen in European football =

German club in European football

Bayer 04 Leverkusen in international football competitions
- Club: Bayer 04 Leverkusen
- Seasons played: 32
- First entry: 1986–87 UEFA Cup
- Latest entry: 2026–27 UEFA Europa League

Titles
- Europa League: 1: 1988

Bayer 04 Leverkusen Fußball GmbH, also known as Bayer 04 Leverkusen, Bayer Leverkusen, or simply Leverkusen, is a German professional football club based in Leverkusen, North Rhine-Westphalia.

Bayer Leverkusen was founded in 1904 by employees of the German pharmaceutical company Bayer AG, whose headquarters are in Leverkusen and from which the club draws its name. The club has won one UEFA Cup, two DFB-Pokals, one DFL-Supercup, and won their first Bundesliga title in the 2023–24 season. They have also finished runners-up five times in the Bundesliga and once each in the UEFA Champions League and UEFA Europa League.

Bayer Leverkusen has competed in European competition for 30 seasons, first qualifying for the 1986–87 UEFA Cup through a sixth placed finish in the 1985–86 Bundesliga, being Germany's fourth representative at the tournament. The club has played in three European finals: they won the two-legged 1988 UEFA Cup final against Espanyol on penalties, lost 2–1 in the 2002 Champions League final against Real Madrid fourteen years later, and lost 3–0 to Atalanta in the 2024 Europa League final twenty-two years after.

== Overall record ==
As of 15 October 2026

=== By competition ===
| Competition | Pld | W | D | L | GF | GA | GD | Win % |
|---|---|---|---|---|---|---|---|---|
| UEFA Champions League | 137 | 51 | 32 | 54 | 196 | 207 | −11 | 37.23 |
| UEFA Cup/Europa League | 144 | 74 | 32 | 38 | 258 | 145 | +113 | 51.39 |
| UEFA Cup Winners' Cup | 6 | 3 | 2 | 1 | 15 | 8 | +7 | 50.00 |
| Total | 287 | 128 | 66 | 93 | 469 | 360 | +109 | 44.60 |

=== By country ===
| Country | Pld | W | D | L | GF | GA | GD | Win % |
|---|---|---|---|---|---|---|---|---|
| Austria | 5 | 4 | 1 | 0 | 17 | 1 | +16 | 80.00 |
| Azerbaijan | 4 | 3 | 1 | 0 | 11 | 5 | +6 | 75.00 |
| Belarus | 2 | 1 | 1 | 0 | 5 | 2 | +3 | 50.00 |
| Belgium | 9 | 4 | 4 | 1 | 12 | 5 | +7 | 44.44 |
| Bulgaria | 4 | 0 | 1 | 3 | 3 | 6 | −3 | 0.00 |
| Cyprus | 2 | 2 | 0 | 0 | 9 | 3 | +6 | 100.00 |
| Czech Republic | 8 | 5 | 2 | 1 | 13 | 2 | +11 | 62.50 |
| Denmark | 5 | 2 | 2 | 1 | 9 | 7 | +2 | 40.00 |
| England | 28 | 6 | 8 | 14 | 30 | 52 | −22 | 21.43 |
| France | 23 | 9 | 5 | 9 | 39 | 40 | −1 | 39.13 |
| Georgia | 2 | 1 | 0 | 1 | 6 | 2 | +4 | 50.00 |
| Germany | 6 | 2 | 1 | 3 | 4 | 8 | −4 | 33.33 |
| Greece | 11 | 4 | 3 | 4 | 16 | 17 | −1 | 36.36 |
| Hungary | 6 | 5 | 0 | 1 | 13 | 2 | +11 | 83.33 |
| Israel | 4 | 4 | 0 | 0 | 12 | 4 | +8 | 100.00 |
| Italy | 30 | 8 | 7 | 15 | 34 | 47 | −13 | 26.67 |
| Netherlands | 8 | 4 | 4 | 0 | 15 | 8 | +7 | 50.00 |
| Norway | 6 | 6 | 0 | 0 | 14 | 2 | +12 | 100.00 |
| Poland | 5 | 5 | 0 | 0 | 18 | 2 | +16 | 100.00 |
| Portugal | 21 | 10 | 4 | 7 | 33 | 26 | +7 | 47.62 |
| Romania | 1 | 0 | 0 | 1 | 1 | 2 | −1 | 0.00 |
| Russia | 13 | 5 | 4 | 4 | 15 | 15 | +0 | 38.46 |
| Scotland | 6 | 4 | 1 | 1 | 13 | 6 | +7 | 66.67 |
| Serbia | 2 | 1 | 1 | 0 | 3 | 0 | +3 | 50.00 |
| Slovenia | 3 | 2 | 1 | 0 | 4 | 0 | +4 | 66.67 |
| Spain | 45 | 14 | 10 | 21 | 58 | 69 | −11 | 31.11 |
| Sweden | 4 | 4 | 0 | 0 | 13 | 1 | +12 | 100.00 |
| Switzerland | 7 | 3 | 1 | 3 | 14 | 10 | +4 | 42.86 |
| Turkey | 5 | 4 | 1 | 0 | 11 | 4 | +7 | 80.00 |
| Ukraine | 12 | 6 | 3 | 3 | 24 | 12 | +12 | 50.00 |

== Results ==
| Season | Competition | Round | Opponent | Home | Away | Aggregate | Reference |
|---|---|---|---|---|---|---|---|
| 1986–87 | UEFA Cup | First round | (Sweden) Kalmar FF | 4–1 | 3–0 | 7–1 | |
| 1986–87 | UEFA Cup | Second round | (Czech Republic) Dukla Prague | 1–1 | 0–0 | 1–1 (a) | |
| 1987–88 | UEFA Cup | First round | Austria Wien | 5–1 | 0–0 | 5–1 | |
| 1987–88 | UEFA Cup | Second round | (France) Toulouse | 1–0 | 1–1 | 2–1 | |
| 1987–88 | UEFA Cup | Third round | (Netherlands) Feyenoord | 1–0 | 2–2 | 3–2 | |
| 1987–88 | UEFA Cup | Quarter-finals | (Spain) Barcelona | 0–0 | 1–0 | 1–0 | |
| 1987–88 | UEFA Cup | Semi-finals | (Germany) Werder Bremen | 1–0 | 0–0 | 1–0 | |
| 1987–88 | UEFA Cup | Final | (Spain) Espanyol | 3–0 (a.e.t.) | 0–3 | 3–3 (3–2 p) | |
| 1988–89 | UEFA Cup | First round | (Portugal) Belenenses | 0–1 | 0–1 | 0–2 | |
| 1990–91 | UEFA Cup | First round | (Netherlands) Twente | 1–0 | 1–1 (a.e.t.) | 2–1 | |
| 1990–91 | UEFA Cup | Second round | (Poland) GKS Katowice | 4–0 | 2–1 | 6–1 | |
| 1990–91 | UEFA Cup | Third round | (Denmark) Brøndby | 0–0 | 0–3 | 0–3 | |
| 1993–94 | Cup Winners' Cup | First round | (Czech Republic) Zbrojovka Brno | 2–0 | 3–0 | 5–0 | |
| 1993–94 | Cup Winners' Cup | Second round | (Greece) Panathinaikos | 1–2 | 4–1 | 5–3 | |
| 1993–94 | Cup Winners' Cup | Quarter-finals | (Portugal) Benfica | 4–4 | 1–1 | 5–5 (a) | |
| 1994–95 | UEFA Cup | First round | (Netherlands) PSV Eindhoven | 5–4 | 0–0 | 5–4 | |
| 1994–95 | UEFA Cup | Second round | (Hungary) Kispesti Honvéd | 5–0 | 2–0 | 7–0 | |
| 1994–95 | UEFA Cup | Third round | (Poland) GKS Katowice | 4–0 | 4–1 | 8–1 | |
| 1994–95 | UEFA Cup | Quarter-finals | (France) Nantes | 5–1 | 0–0 | 5–1 | |
| 1994–95 | UEFA Cup | Semi-finals | (Italy) Parma | 1–2 | 0–3 | 1–5 | |
| 1997–98 | UEFA Champions League | Second qualifying round | (Georgia (country)) Dinamo Tbilisi | 6–1 | 0–1 | 6–2 | |
| 1997–98 | UEFA Champions League | Group F | (Belgium) Lierse | 1–0 | 2–0 | 2nd | |
| 1997–98 | UEFA Champions League | Group F | (France) Monaco | 2–2 | 0–4 | 2nd | |
| 1997–98 | UEFA Champions League | Group F | (Portugal) Sporting CP | 4–1 | 2–0 | 2nd | |
| 1997–98 | UEFA Champions League | Quarter-finals | (Spain) Real Madrid | 1–1 | 0–3 | 1–4 | |
| 1998–99 | UEFA Cup | First round | (Italy) Udinese | 1–0 | 1–1 | 2–1 | |
| 1998–99 | UEFA Cup | Second round | (Scotland) Rangers | 1–2 | 1–1 | 2–3 | |
| 1999–2000 | UEFA Champions League | Group A | (Italy) Lazio | 1–1 | 1–1 | 3rd | |
| 1999–2000 | UEFA Champions League | Group A | (Slovenia) Maribor | 0–0 | 2–0 | 3rd | |
| 1999–2000 | UEFA Champions League | Group A | (Ukraine) Dynamo Kyiv | 1–1 | 2–4 | 3rd | |
| 1999–2000 | UEFA Cup | Third round | (Italy) Udinese | 1–2 | 1–0 | 2–2 (a) | |
| 2000–01 | UEFA Champions League | Group A | (Russia) Spartak Moscow | 1–0 | 0–2 | 3rd | |
| 2000–01 | UEFA Champions League | Group A | (Portugal) Sporting CP | 3–2 | 0–0 | 3rd | |
| 2000–01 | UEFA Champions League | Group A | (Spain) Real Madrid | 2–3 | 3–5 | 3rd | |
| 2000–01 | UEFA Cup | Third round | (Greece) AEK Athens | 4–4 | 0–2 | 4–6 | |
| 2001–02 | UEFA Champions League | Third qualifying round | (Serbia and Montenegro) Red Star Belgrade | 3–0 | 0–0 | 3–0 | |
| 2001–02 | UEFA Champions League | Group F | (France) Lyon | 2–4 | 1–0 | 2nd | |
| 2001–02 | UEFA Champions League | Group F | (Spain) Barcelona | 2–1 | 1–2 | 2nd | |
| 2001–02 | UEFA Champions League | Group F | (Turkey) Fenerbahçe | 2–1 | 2–1 | 2nd | |
| 2001–02 | UEFA Champions League | Group D | (Italy) Juventus | 3–1 | 0–4 | 1st | |
| 2001–02 | UEFA Champions League | Group D | (Spain) Deportivo La Coruña | 3–0 | 3–1 | 1st | |
| 2001–02 | UEFA Champions League | Group D | (England) Arsenal | 1–1 | 1–4 | 1st | |
| 2001–02 | UEFA Champions League | Quarter-finals | (England) Liverpool | 4–2 | 0–1 | 4–3 | |
| 2001–02 | UEFA Champions League | Semi-finals | (England) Manchester United | 1–1 | 2–2 | 3–3 (a) | |
| 2001–02 | UEFA Champions League | Final | (Spain) Real Madrid | 1–2 (N) | | | |
| 2002–03 | UEFA Champions League | Group F | (Greece) Olympiacos | 2–0 | 2–6 | 2nd | |
| 2002–03 | UEFA Champions League | Group F | (England) Manchester United | 1–2 | 0–2 | 2nd | |
| 2002–03 | UEFA Champions League | Group F | (Israel) Maccabi Haifa | 2–1 | 2–0 | 2nd | |
| 2002–03 | UEFA Champions League | Group A | (Spain) Barcelona | 1–2 | 0–2 | 4th | |
| 2002–03 | UEFA Champions League | Group A | (Italy) Internazionale | 0–2 | 2–3 | 4th | |
| 2002–03 | UEFA Champions League | Group A | (England) Newcastle United | 1–3 | 1–3 | 4th | |
| 2004–05 | UEFA Champions League | Group B | (Spain) Real Madrid | 3–0 | 1–1 | 1st | |
| 2004–05 | UEFA Champions League | Group B | (Ukraine) Dynamo Kyiv | 3–0 | 2–4 | 1st | |
| 2004–05 | UEFA Champions League | Group B | (Italy) Roma | 3–1 | 1–1 | 1st | |
| 2004–05 | UEFA Champions League | Round of 16 | (England) Liverpool | 1–3 | 1–3 | 2–6 | |
| 2005–06 | UEFA Cup | First round | (Bulgaria) CSKA Sofia | 0–1 | 0–1 | 0–2 | |
| 2006–07 | UEFA Cup | First round | (Switzerland) Sion | 3–1 | 0–0 | 3–1 | |
| 2006–07 | UEFA Cup | Group B | (Belgium) Club Brugge | —N/a | 1–1 | 3rd | |
| 2006–07 | UEFA Cup | Group B | (England) Tottenham Hotspur | 0–1 | —N/a | 3rd | |
| 2006–07 | UEFA Cup | Group B | (Romania) Dinamo București | —N/a | 1–2 | 3rd | |
| 2006–07 | UEFA Cup | Group B | (Turkey) Beşiktaş | 2–1 | —N/a | 3rd | |
| 2006–07 | UEFA Cup | Round of 32 | (England) Blackburn Rovers | 3–2 | 0–0 | 3–2 | |
| 2006–07 | UEFA Cup | Round of 16 | (France) Lens | 3–0 | 1–2 | 4–2 | |
| 2006–07 | UEFA Cup | Quarter-finals | (Spain) Osasuna | 0–3 | 0–1 | 0–4 | |
| 2007–08 | UEFA Cup | First round | (Portugal) União de Leiria | 3–1 | 2–3 | 5–4 | |
| 2007–08 | UEFA Cup | Group E | (France) Toulouse | 1–0 | —N/a | 1st | |
| 2007–08 | UEFA Cup | Group E | (Russia) Spartak Moscow | —N/a | 1–2 | 1st | |
| 2007–08 | UEFA Cup | Group E | (Czech Republic) Sparta Prague | 1–0 | —N/a | 1st | |
| 2007–08 | UEFA Cup | Group E | (Switzerland) Zürich | —N/a | 5–0 | 1st | |
| 2007–08 | UEFA Cup | Round of 32 | (Turkey) Galatasaray | 5–1 | 0–0 | 5–1 | |
| 2007–08 | UEFA Cup | Round of 16 | (Germany) Hamburger SV | 1–0 | 2–3 | 3–3 (a) | |
| 2007–08 | UEFA Cup | Quarter-finals | (Russia) Zenit Saint Petersburg | 1–4 | 1–0 | 2–4 | |
| 2010–11 | UEFA Europa League | Play-off round | (Ukraine) Tavriya Simferopol | 3–0 | 3–1 | 6–1 | |
| 2010–11 | UEFA Europa League | Group B | (Norway) Rosenborg | 4–0 | 1–0 | 1st | |
| 2010–11 | UEFA Europa League | Group B | (Spain) Atlético Madrid | 1–1 | 1–1 | 1st | |
| 2010–11 | UEFA Europa League | Group B | (Greece) Aris | 1–0 | 0–0 | 1st | |
| 2010–11 | UEFA Europa League | Round of 32 | (Ukraine) Metalist Kharkiv | 2–0 | 4–0 | 6–0 | |
| 2010–11 | UEFA Europa League | Round of 16 | (Spain) Villarreal | 2–3 | 1–2 | 3–5 | |
| 2011–12 | UEFA Champions League | Group E | (England) Chelsea | 2–1 | 0–2 | 2nd | |
| 2011–12 | UEFA Champions League | Group E | (Belgium) Genk | 2–0 | 1–1 | 2nd | |
| 2011–12 | UEFA Champions League | Group E | (Spain) Valencia | 2–1 | 1–3 | 2nd | |
| 2011–12 | UEFA Champions League | Round of 16 | (Spain) Barcelona | 1–3 | 1–7 | 2–10 | |
| 2012–13 | UEFA Europa League | Group K | (Ukraine) Metalist Kharkiv | 0–0 | 0–2 | 2nd | |
| 2012–13 | UEFA Europa League | Group K | (Norway) Rosenborg | 1–0 | 1–0 | 2nd | |
| 2012–13 | UEFA Europa League | Group K | (Austria) Rapid Wien | 3–0 | 4–0 | 2nd | |
| 2012–13 | UEFA Europa League | Round of 32 | (Portugal) Benfica | 0–1 | 1–2 | 1–3 | |
| 2013–14 | UEFA Champions League | Group A | (England) Manchester United | 0–5 | 2–4 | 2nd | |
| 2013–14 | UEFA Champions League | Group A | (Spain) Real Sociedad | 2–1 | 1–0 | 2nd | |
| 2013–14 | UEFA Champions League | Group A | (Ukraine) Shakhtar Donetsk | 4–0 | 0–0 | 2nd | |
| 2013–14 | UEFA Champions League | Round of 16 | (France) Paris Saint-Germain | 0–4 | 1–2 | 1–6 | |
| 2014–15 | UEFA Champions League | Play-off round | (Denmark) Copenhagen | 4–0 | 3–2 | 7–2 | |
| 2014–15 | UEFA Champions League | Group C | (France) Monaco | 0–1 | 0–1 | 2nd | |
| 2014–15 | UEFA Champions League | Group C | (Portugal) Benfica | 3–1 | 0–0 | 2nd | |
| 2014–15 | UEFA Champions League | Group C | (Russia) Zenit Saint Petersburg | 2–0 | 2–1 | 2nd | |
| 2014–15 | UEFA Champions League | Round of 16 | (Spain) Atlético Madrid | 1–0 | 0–1 (a.e.t.) | 1–1 (2–3 p) | |
| 2015–16 | UEFA Champions League | Play-off round | (Italy) Lazio | 3–0 | 0–1 | 3–1 | |
| 2015–16 | UEFA Champions League | Group E | (Belarus) BATE Borisov | 4–1 | 1–1 | 3rd | |
| 2015–16 | UEFA Champions League | Group E | (Spain) Barcelona | 1–1 | 1–2 | 3rd | |
| 2015–16 | UEFA Champions League | Group E | (Italy) Roma | 4–4 | 2–3 | 3rd | |
| 2015–16 | UEFA Europa League | Round of 32 | (Portugal) Sporting CP | 1–0 | 3–1 | 4–1 | |
| 2015–16 | UEFA Europa League | Round of 16 | (Spain) Villarreal | 0–0 | 0–2 | 0–2 | |
| 2016–17 | UEFA Champions League | Group E | (Russia) CSKA Moscow | 2–2 | 1–1 | 2nd | |
| 2016–17 | UEFA Champions League | Group E | (France) Monaco | 3–0 | 1–1 | 2nd | |
| 2016–17 | UEFA Champions League | Group E | (England) Tottenham Hotspur | 0–0 | 1–0 | 2nd | |
| 2016–17 | UEFA Champions League | Round of 16 | (Spain) Atlético Madrid | 2–4 | 0–0 | 2–4 | |
| 2018–19 | UEFA Europa League | Group A | (Bulgaria) Ludogorets Razgrad | 1–1 | 2–3 | 1st | |
| 2018–19 | UEFA Europa League | Group A | (Cyprus) AEK Larnaca | 4–2 | 5–1 | 1st | |
| 2018–19 | UEFA Europa League | Group A | (Switzerland) Zürich | 1–0 | 2–3 | 1st | |
| 2018–19 | UEFA Europa League | Round of 32 | (Russia) Krasnodar | 1–1 | 0–0 | 1–1 (a) | |
| 2019–20 | UEFA Champions League | Group D | (Russia) Lokomotiv Moscow | 1–2 | 2–0 | 3rd | |
| 2019–20 | UEFA Champions League | Group D | (Italy) Juventus | 0–2 | 0–3 | 3rd | |
| 2019–20 | UEFA Champions League | Group D | (Spain) Atlético Madrid | 2–1 | 0–1 | 3rd | |
| 2019–20 | UEFA Europa League | Round of 32 | (Portugal) Porto | 2–1 | 3–1 | 5–2 | |
| 2019–20 | UEFA Europa League | Round of 16 | (Scotland) Rangers | 1–0 | 3–1 | 4–1 | |
| 2019–20 | UEFA Europa League | Quarter-finals | (Italy) Internazionale | 1–2 (N) | | | |
| 2020–21 | UEFA Europa League | Group C | (France) Nice | 6–2 | 3–2 | 1st | |
| 2020–21 | UEFA Europa League | Group C | (Czech Republic) Slavia Prague | 4–0 | 0–1 | 1st | |
| 2020–21 | UEFA Europa League | Group C | (Israel) Hapoel Be'er Sheva | 4–1 | 4–2 | 1st | |
| 2020–21 | UEFA Europa League | Round of 32 | (Switzerland) Young Boys | 0–2 | 3–4 | 3–6 | |
| 2021–22 | UEFA Europa League | Group G | (Hungary) Ferencváros | 2–1 | 0–1 | 1st | |
| 2021–22 | UEFA Europa League | Group G | (Scotland) Celtic | 3–2 | 4–0 | 1st | |
| 2021–22 | UEFA Europa League | Group G | (Spain) Real Betis | 4–0 | 1–1 | 1st | |
| 2021–22 | UEFA Europa League | Round of 16 | (Italy) Atalanta | 0–1 | 2–3 | 2–4 | |
| 2022–23 | UEFA Champions League | Group B | (Belgium) Club Brugge | 0–0 | 0–1 | 3rd | |
| 2022–23 | UEFA Champions League | Group B | (Spain) Atlético Madrid | 2–0 | 2–2 | 3rd | |
| 2022–23 | UEFA Champions League | Group B | (Portugal) Porto | 0–3 | 0–2 | 3rd | |
| 2022–23 | UEFA Europa League | Knockout round play-offs | (France) Monaco | 2–3 | 3–2 (a.e.t.) | 5–5 (5–3 p) | |
| 2022–23 | UEFA Europa League | Round of 16 | (Hungary) Ferencváros | 2–0 | 2–0 | 4–0 | |
| 2022–23 | UEFA Europa League | Quarter-finals | (Belgium) Union Saint-Gilloise | 1–1 | 4–1 | 5–1 | |
| 2022–23 | UEFA Europa League | Semi-finals | (Italy) Roma | 0–0 | 0–1 | 0–1 | |
| 2023–24 | UEFA Europa League | Group H | (Sweden) BK Häcken | 4–0 | 2–0 | 1st | |
| 2023–24 | UEFA Europa League | Group H | (Norway) Molde | 5–1 | 2–1 | 1st | |
| 2023–24 | UEFA Europa League | Group H | (Azerbaijan) Qarabağ | 5–1 | 1–0 | 1st | |
| 2023–24 | UEFA Europa League | Round of 16 | (Azerbaijan) Qarabağ | 3–2 | 2–2 | 5–4 | |
| 2023–24 | UEFA Europa League | Quarter-finals | (England) West Ham United | 2–0 | 1–1 | 3–1 | |
| 2023–24 | UEFA Europa League | Semi-finals | (Italy) Roma | 2–2 | 2–0 | 4–2 | |
| 2023–24 | UEFA Europa League | Final | (Italy) Atalanta | 0–3 (N) | | | |
| 2024–25 | UEFA Champions League | League phase | (Netherlands) Feyenoord | —N/a | 4–0 | 6th | |
| 2024–25 | UEFA Champions League | League phase | (Italy) Milan | 1–0 | —N/a | 6th | |
| 2024–25 | UEFA Champions League | League phase | (France) Brest | —N/a | 1–1 | 6th | |
| 2024–25 | UEFA Champions League | League phase | (England) Liverpool | —N/a | 0–4 | 6th | |
| 2024–25 | UEFA Champions League | League phase | (Austria) Red Bull Salzburg | 5–0 | —N/a | 6th | |
| 2024–25 | UEFA Champions League | League phase | (Italy) Internazionale | 1–0 | —N/a | 6th | |
| 2024–25 | UEFA Champions League | League phase | (Spain) Atlético Madrid | —N/a | 1–2 | 6th | |
| 2024–25 | UEFA Champions League | League phase | (Czech Republic) Sparta Prague | 2–0 | —N/a | 6th | |
| 2024–25 | UEFA Champions League | Round of 16 | (Germany) Bayern Munich | 0–2 | 0–3 | 0–5 | |
| 2025–26 | UEFA Champions League | League phase | (Denmark) Copenhagen | —N/a | 2–2 | 16th | |
| 2025–26 | UEFA Champions League | League phase | (Netherlands) PSV Eindhoven | 1–1 | —N/a | 16th | |
| 2025–26 | UEFA Champions League | League phase | (France) Paris Saint-Germain | 2–7 | —N/a | 16th | |
| 2025–26 | UEFA Champions League | League phase | (Portugal) Benfica | —N/a | 1–0 | 16th | |
| 2025–26 | UEFA Champions League | League phase | (England) Manchester City | —N/a | 2–0 | 16th | |
| 2025–26 | UEFA Champions League | League phase | (England) Newcastle United | 2–2 | —N/a | 16th | |
| 2025–26 | UEFA Champions League | League phase | (Greece) Olympiacos | —N/a | 0–2 | 16th | |
| 2025–26 | UEFA Champions League | League phase | (Spain) Villarreal | 3–0 | —N/a | 16th | |
| 2025–26 | UEFA Champions League | Knockout phase play-offs | (Greece) Olympiacos | 0–0 | 2–0 | 2–0 | |
| 2025–26 | UEFA Champions League | Round of 16 | (England) Arsenal | 1–1 | 0–2 | 1–3 | |
| 2026–27 | UEFA Europa League | League phase | (Slovenia) Celje | 2–0 | —N/a | | |
| 2026–27 | UEFA Europa League | League phase | (Poland) Lech Poznań | —N/a | 4–0 | | |
| 2026–27 | UEFA Europa League | League phase | (Greece) OFI | —N/a | | | |
| 2026–27 | UEFA Europa League | League phase | (France) Marseille | | —N/a | | |
| 2026–27 | UEFA Europa League | League phase | (Croatia) Dinamo Zagreb | —N/a | | | |
| 2026–27 | UEFA Europa League | League phase | (Turkey) Beşiktaş | | —N/a | | |
| 2026–27 | UEFA Europa League | League phase | (Austria) Red Bull Salzburg | | —N/a | | |
| 2026–27 | UEFA Europa League | League phase | (France) Lyon | —N/a | | | |
