= 1988 UEFA Cup final =

- Event: 1987–88 UEFA Cup
Español	Bayer Leverkusen
(Spain)	(West Germany)
3	3
- on aggregate Bayer Leverkusen won 3–2 on penalties

First leg
Español	Bayer Leverkusen
3	0
- Date: 4 May 1988
- Venue: Estadi de Sarrià, Barcelona
- Referee: Dušan Krchňák (Czechoslovakia)
- Attendance: 31,180

Second leg
Bayer Leverkusen	Español
3	0
- After extra time
- Date: 18 May 1988
- Venue: Ulrich-Haberland-Stadion, Leverkusen
- Referee: Jan Keizer (Netherlands)
- Attendance: 21,600

The 1988 UEFA Cup Final was an association football tie played on 4 May 1988 and 18 May 1988 between RCD Español (Note: The Barcelona-based club had formerly been known as Reial Club Deportivo Espanyol, with the Catalan spelling reflecting its Catalonian roots. However, after the Spanish Civil War, they were forced to change their name to RCD Español (the Spanish spelling), due to Francisco Franco–– a Spanish nationalist–– ordering the abolishment of the Catalan language in Spain. This spelling of the team's name would last until 1995, when the club reverted to the original Catalan spelling; today the club is once again named RCD Espanyol.) of Spain and Bayer Leverkusen of West Germany, to determine the champion of the 1987–88 UEFA Cup competition. Leverkusen won 3–2 on penalties after a 3–3 draw on aggregate.

== Route to the final ==
Español				Round	Bayer Leverkusen			
Opponent	Agg.	1st leg	2nd leg		Opponent	Agg.	1st leg	2nd leg
(West Germany) Borussia Mönchengladbach	5–1	1–0 (A)	4–1 (H)	First round	Austria Wien	5–1	0–0 (A)	5–1 (H)
(Italy) A.C. Milan	2–0	2–0 (A)	0–0 (H)	Second round	(France) Toulouse	2–1	1–1 (A)	1–0 (H)
(Italy) Internazionale	2–1	1–1 (A)	1–0 (H)	Third round	(Netherlands) Feyenoord	3–2	2–2 (A)	1–0 (H)
(Czechoslovakia) TJ Vítkovice	2–0	2–0 (H)	0–0 (A)	Quarter-finals	(Spain) Barcelona	1–0	0–0 (H)	1–0 (A)
(Belgium) Club Brugge	3–2 (a.e.t.)	0–2 (A)	3–0 (a.e.t.) (H)	Semi-finals	(West Germany) Werder Bremen	1–0	1–0 (H)	0–0 (A)

== Match details ==
=== First leg ===
4 May 1988

Español (Spain)	3–0	(West Germany) Bayer Leverkusen
Losada 45', 56'; Soler 49'	Report Overview (archive) Overview

Sarria Stadium, Barcelona, Spain
Attendance: 31,180
Referee: Dušan Krchňák (Czechoslovakia)

Español	Bayer Leverkusen

GK	1	(Cameroon) Thomas N'Kono
DF	2	(Spain) Job
DF	5	(Spain) Miguel Ángel
DF	4	(Spain) Josep María Gallart
MF	3	(Spain) Miquel Soler
MF	6	(Spain) Diego Orejuela (c)	(substituted off) 66'
MF	7	(Spain) Santiago Urquiaga
MF	8	(Spain) Iñaki
FW	9	(Spain) Ernesto Valverde
FW	10	(Spain) Pichi Alonso	(substituted off) 69'
FW	11	(Spain) Sebastián Losada
Substitutes:
DF	12	(Spain) Joan Golobart	(substituted on) 66'
MF	14	(Denmark) John Lauridsen	(substituted on) 69'
Manager:
(Spain) Javier Clemente

GK	1	(West Germany) Rüdiger Vollborn
SW	2	(West Germany) Wolfgang Rolff (c)
CB	3	(West Germany) Jean-Pierre de Keyser
CB	4	(West Germany) Alois Reinhardt
CB	5	(West Germany) Florian Hinterberger
RM	7	(South Korea) Cha Bum-kun		(substituted off) 18'
CM	6	(Poland) Andrzej Buncol
CM	8	(West Germany) Ralf Falkenmayer		(substituted off) 75'
LM	10	(Brazil) Tita
CF	9	(West Germany) Herbert Waas
CF	11	(West Germany) Klaus Täuber	(yellow card) 54'
Substitutes:
MF	12	(East Germany) Falko Götz		(substituted on) 18'
MF	14	(West Germany) Knut Reinhardt		(substituted on) 75'
GK	13	(West Germany) Bernd Dreher
Manager:
(West Germany) Erich Ribbeck

=== Second leg ===
18 May 1988

Bayer Leverkusen (West Germany)	3–0 (a.e.t.)	(Spain) Español
Tita 57'; Götz 63'; Cha Bum-kun 81'	Report Overview (archive) Overview
Penalties
Falkenmayer (penalty missed); Rolff (penalty scored); Waas (penalty scored); Täuber (penalty scored)	3–2	(penalty scored) Alonso; (penalty scored) Job; (penalty missed) Urquiaga; (penalty missed) Zúñiga; (penalty missed) Losada

Ulrich-Haberland-Stadion, Leverkusen, West Germany
Attendance: 21,600
Referee: Jan Keizer (Netherlands)

Bayer Leverkusen	Español

GK	1	(West Germany) Rüdiger Vollborn
SW	2	(West Germany) Wolfgang Rolff (c)
CB	3	(West Germany) Erich Seckler
CB	4	(West Germany) Alois Reinhardt	(yellow card) 2'
CB	5	(West Germany) Knut Reinhardt	(yellow card) 88'
CM	11	(West Germany) Christian Schreier		(substituted off) 46'
CM	6	(Poland) Andrzej Buncol
CM	8	(West Germany) Ralf Falkenmayer
RF	7	(South Korea) Cha Bum-kun
CF	9	(East Germany) Falko Götz
LF	10	(Brazil) Tita		(substituted off) 62'
Substitutes:
FW	12	(West Germany) Herbert Waas		(substituted on) 46'
FW	14	(West Germany) Klaus Täuber		(substituted on) 62'
GK	13	(West Germany) Bernd Dreher
Manager:
(West Germany) Erich Ribbeck

GK	1	(Cameroon) Thomas N'Kono
DF	2	(Spain) Job
DF	6	(Spain) Josep María Gallart
DF	4	(Spain) Miguel Ángel	(yellow card) 65'
DF	5	(Spain) Santiago Urquiaga	(yellow card) 90'
MF	9	(Spain) Iñaki
MF	7	(Spain) Diego Orejuela		(substituted off) 66'
MF	8	(Spain) Joan Golobart		(substituted off) 73'
MF	3	(Spain) Miquel Soler
FW	10	(Spain) Pichi Alonso (c)
FW	11	(Spain) Sebastián Losada
Substitutes:
MF	12	(Spain) Javier Zubillaga		(substituted on) 66'
MF	14	(Spain) Manuel Zúñiga		(substituted on) 73'
Manager:
(Spain) Javier Clemente

== See also ==
- 1988 European Cup final
- 1988 European Cup Winners' Cup final
- Bayer 04 Leverkusen in European football
- RCD Espanyol in European football
