= Atalanta BC in European football =

Italian club in European football

- Club: Atalanta
- Seasons played: 12
- First entry: 1963–64 European Cup Winners' Cup
- Latest entry: 2026–27 UEFA Conference League

Titles
- Europa League: 1: 2024

These are the matches that Atalanta has played in European football competitions.

The club won the UEFA Europa League in 2024, its first European title, after defeating Bayer Leverkusen 3–0 in the final. All three final goals were scored by Ademola Lookman, who became the sixth player to score a hat-trick in a European cup final.

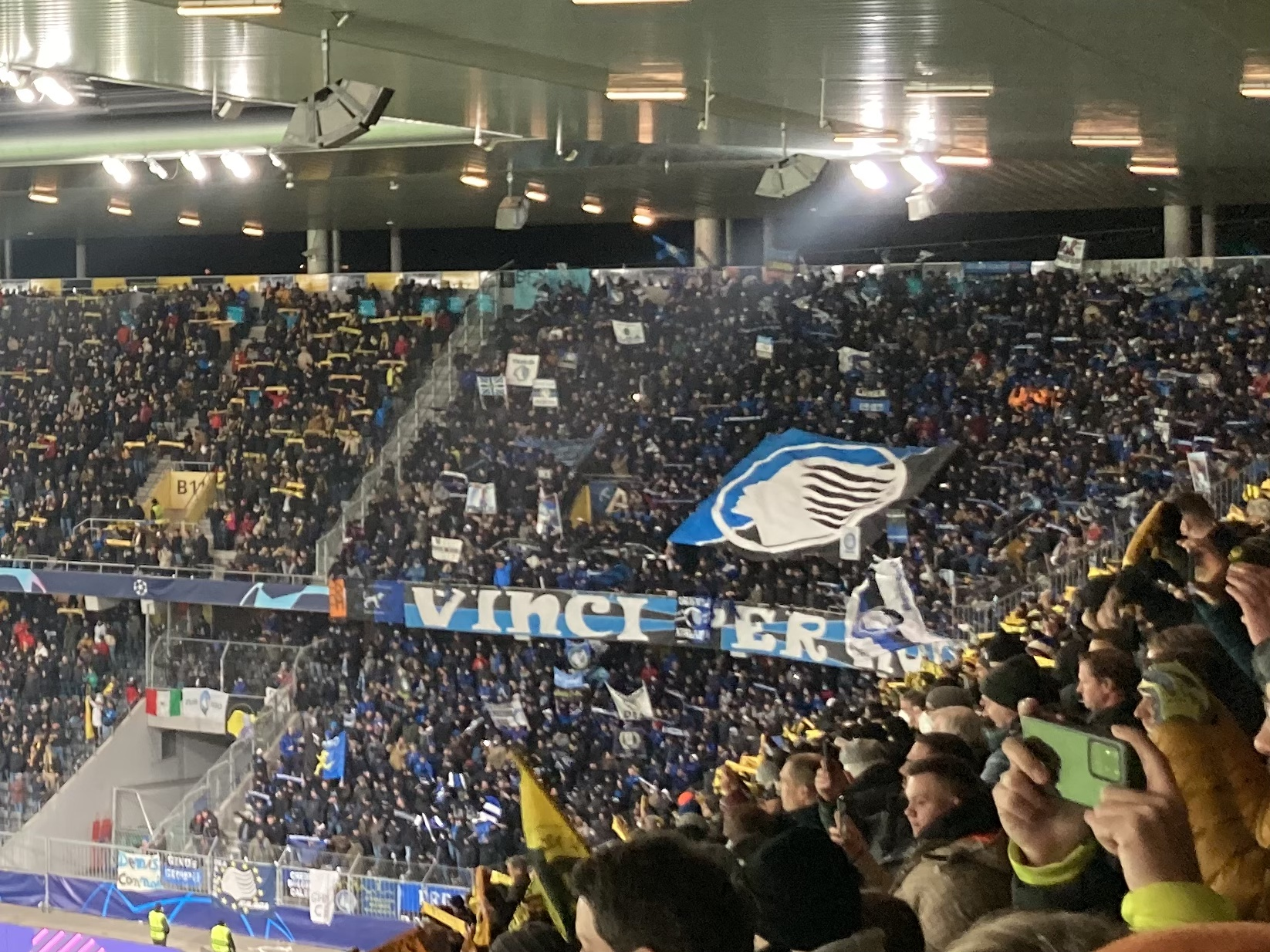
Atalanta fans before a Champions League match against Young Boys

== Matches ==
Atalanta's score listed first.

=== UEFA Champions League ===
Season	Round	Opposition	Home	Away	Aggregate	Ref.
2019–20	Group stage	(Ukraine) Shakhtar Donetsk	1–2	3–0	2nd	
2019–20	Group stage	(England) Manchester City	1–1	1–5	2nd	
2019–20	Group stage	(Croatia) Dinamo Zagreb	2–0	0–4	2nd	
2019–20	Round of 16	(Spain) Valencia	4–1	4–3	8–4	
2019–20	Quarter-finals	(France) Paris Saint-Germain	1–2			
2020–21	Group stage	(England) Liverpool	0–5	2–0	2nd	
2020–21	Group stage	(Netherlands) Ajax	2–2	1–0	2nd	
2020–21	Group stage	(Denmark) Midtjylland	1–1	4–0	2nd	
2020–21	Round of 16	(Spain) Real Madrid	0–1	1–3	1–4	
2021–22	Group stage	(Spain) Villarreal	2–3	2–2	3rd	
2021–22	Group stage	(Switzerland) Young Boys	1–0	3–3	3rd	
2021–22	Group stage	(England) Manchester United	2–2	2–3	3rd	
2024–25	League phase	(England) Arsenal	0–0	—N/a	9th	
2024–25	League phase	(Ukraine) Shakhtar Donetsk	—N/a	3–0	9th	
2024–25	League phase	(Scotland) Celtic	0–0	—N/a	9th	
2024–25	League phase	(Germany) VfB Stuttgart	—N/a	2–0	9th	
2024–25	League phase	(Switzerland) Young Boys	—N/a	6–1	9th	
2024–25	League phase	(Spain) Real Madrid	2–3	—N/a	9th	
2024–25	League phase	(Austria) Sturm Graz	5–0	—N/a	9th	
2024–25	League phase	(Spain) Barcelona	—N/a	2–2	9th	
2024–25	Knockout phase play-offs	(Belgium) Club Brugge	1–3	1–2	2–5	
2025–26	League phase	(France) Paris Saint-Germain	—N/a	0–4	15th	
2025–26	League phase	(Belgium) Club Brugge	2–1	—N/a	15th	
2025–26	League phase	(Czech Republic) Slavia Prague	0–0	—N/a	15th	
2025–26	League phase	(France) Marseille	—N/a	1–0	15th	
2025–26	League phase	(Germany) Eintracht Frankfurt	—N/a	3–0	15th	
2025–26	League phase	(England) Chelsea	2–1	—N/a	15th	
2025–26	League phase	(Spain) Athletic Bilbao	2–3	—N/a	15th	
2025–26	League phase	(Belgium) Union Saint-Gilloise	—N/a	0–1	15th	
2025–26	Knockout phase play-offs	(Germany) Borussia Dortmund	4–1	0–2	4–3	
2025–26	Round of 16	(Germany) Bayern Munich	1–6	1–4	2–10	

=== UEFA Cup / UEFA Europa League ===
Season	Round	Opposition	Home	Away	Aggregate	Ref.
1989–90	First round	(Soviet Union) Spartak Moscow	0–0	0–2	0–2	
1990–91	First round	(Socialist Federal Republic of Yugoslavia) Dinamo Zagreb	0–0	1–1	1–1 (a)	
1990–91	Second round	(Turkey) Fenerbahçe	4–1	1–0	5–1	
1990–91	Third round	(Germany) 1. FC Köln	1–0	1–1	2–1	
1990–91	Quarter-finals	(Italy) Internazionale	0–0	0–2	0–2	
2017–18	Group stage	(France) Lyon	1–0	1–1	1st	
2017–18	Group stage	(England) Everton	3–0	5–1	1st	
2017–18	Group stage	(Cyprus) Apollon Limassol	3–1	1–1	1st	
2017–18	Round of 32	(Germany) Borussia Dortmund	1–1	2–3	3–4	
2018–19	Second qualifying round	(Bosnia and Herzegovina) Sarajevo	2–2	8–0	10–2	
2018–19	Third qualifying round	(Israel) Hapoel Haifa	2–0	4–1	6–1	
2018–19	Play-off round	(Denmark) Copenhagen	0–0	0–0 (a.e.t.)	0–0 (3–4 p)	
2021–22	Knockout round play-offs	(Greece) Olympiacos	2–1	3–0	5–1	
2021–22	Round of 16	(Germany) Bayer Leverkusen	3–2	1–0	4–2	
2021–22	Quarter-finals	(Germany) RB Leipzig	0–2	1–1	1–3	
2023–24	Group stage	(Poland) Raków Częstochowa	2–0	4–0	1st	
2023–24	Group stage	(Portugal) Sporting CP	1–1	2–1	1st	
2023–24	Group stage	(Austria) Sturm Graz	1–0	2–2	1st	
2023–24	Round of 16	(Portugal) Sporting CP	2–1	1–1	3–2	
2023–24	Quarter-finals	(England) Liverpool	0–1	3–0	3–1	
2023–24	Semi-finals	(France) Marseille	3–0	1–1	4–1	
2023–24	Final	(Germany) Bayer Leverkusen	3–0			

=== European Cup Winners' Cup ===
Season	Round	Opposition	Home	Away	Aggregate	Ref.
1963–64	First round	(Portugal) Sporting CP	2–0	1–3	3–3 1–3 (replay, a.e.t.)	
1987–88	First round	(Wales) Merthyr Tydfil	2–0	1–2	3–2	
1987–88	Second round	(Greece) OFI	2–0	0–1	2–1	
1987–88	Quarter-finals	(Portugal) Sporting CP	2–0	1–1	3–1	
1987–88	Semi-finals	(Belgium) Mechelen	1–2	1–2	2–4	

=== UEFA Conference League ===
Season	Round	Opposition	Home	Away	Aggregate	Ref.
2026–27	Play-off round	(Israel) Hapoel Tel Aviv	0–0	1–0	1–0	
2026–27	League phase	(Cyprus) Pafos	3–1	—N/a		
2026–27	League phase	(Netherlands) Ajax	—N/a	0–2		
2026–27	League phase	(Kazakhstan) Kairat	1–1	—N/a		
2026–27	League phase	(Bosnia and Herzegovina) Borac Banja Luka	—N/a			
2026–27	League phase	(Latvia) Riga	—N/a			
2026–27	League phase	(Sweden) Mjällby AIF		—N/a		

=== UEFA Super Cup ===
Edition	Opposition	Score	Ref.
2024	(Spain) Real Madrid	0–2	

== Overall record ==
=== By competition ===
Accurate as of 5 November 2026

Competition	Pld	W	D	L	GF	GA	GD	Win%
UEFA Champions League	45	17	10	18	78	77	+1	37.78
UEFA Cup / UEFA Europa League	43	22	16	5	76	32	+44	51.16
European Cup Winners' Cup	11	4	1	6	14	14	+0	36.36
UEFA Conference League	5	2	2	1	5	4	+1	40.00
UEFA Super Cup	1	0	0	1	0	2	−2	0.00
Total	105	45	29	31	173	129	+44	42.86

Source: UEFA.com
Pld = Matches played; W = Matches won; D = Matches drawn; L = Matches lost; GF = Goals for; GA = Goals against; GD = Goal Difference.

=== By country ===
As of 5 November 2026
Key

Positive balance (more wins than losses)
Neutral balance (as many wins as losses)
Negative balance (more losses than wins)

Country	Pld	W	D	L	GF	GA	GD	Win%
Austria	3	2	1	0	8	2	+6	66.67
Belgium	6	1	0	5	6	11	−5	16.67
Bosnia and Herzegovina	2	1	1	0	10	2	+8	50.00
Croatia	4	1	2	1	3	5	−2	25.00
Cyprus	3	2	1	0	7	3	+4	66.67
Czech Republic	1	0	1	0	0	0	+0	0.00
Denmark	4	1	3	0	5	1	+4	25.00
England	12	5	3	4	21	19	+2	41.67
France	7	3	2	2	8	8	+0	42.86
Germany	15	7	3	5	24	23	+1	46.67
Greece	4	3	0	1	7	2	+5	75.00
Israel	4	3	1	0	7	1	+6	75.00
Italy	2	0	1	1	0	2	−2	0.00
Kazakhstan	1	0	1	0	1	1	+0	0.00
Poland	2	2	0	0	6	0	+6	100.00
Portugal	8	4	3	1	12	8	+4	50.00
Netherlands	3	1	1	1	3	4	−1	33.33
Russia	2	0	1	1	0	2	−2	0.00
Scotland	1	0	1	0	0	0	+0	0.00
Spain	10	2	2	6	19	23	−4	20.00
Switzerland	3	2	1	0	10	4	+6	66.67
Turkey	2	2	0	0	5	1	+4	100.00
Ukraine	3	2	0	1	7	2	+5	66.67
Wales	2	1	0	1	3	2	+1	50.00

=== By club ===
As of 5 November 2026
Key

Positive balance (more wins than losses)
Neutral balance (as many wins as losses)
Negative balance (more losses than wins)

Club	Pld	W	D	L	GF	GA	GD	Win%
(Austria) Sturm Graz	3	2	1	0	8	2	+6	66.67
(Belgium) Club Brugge	3	1	0	2	4	6	−2	33.33
(Belgium) Mechelen	2	0	0	2	2	4	−2	0.00
(Belgium) Union Saint-Gilloise	1	0	0	1	0	1	−1	0.00
(Bosnia and Herzegovina) Sarajevo	2	1	1	0	10	2	+8	50.00
(Croatia) Dinamo Zagreb	4	1	2	1	3	5	−2	25.00
(Cyprus) Apollon Limassol	2	1	1	0	4	2	+2	50.00
(Cyprus) Pafos	1	1	0	0	3	1	+2	100.00
(Czech Republic) Slavia Prague	1	0	1	0	0	0	+0	0.00
(Denmark) Copenhagen	2	0	2	0	0	0	+0	0.00
(Denmark) Midtjylland	2	1	1	0	5	1	+4	50.00
(England) Arsenal	1	0	1	0	0	0	+0	0.00
(England) Chelsea	1	1	0	0	2	1	+1	100.00
(England) Everton	2	2	0	0	8	1	+7	100.00
(England) Liverpool	4	2	0	2	5	6	−1	50.00
(England) Manchester City	2	0	1	1	2	6	−4	0.00
(England) Manchester United	2	0	1	1	4	5	−1	0.00
(France) Lyon	2	1	1	0	2	1	+1	50.00
(France) Marseille	3	2	1	0	5	1	+4	66.67
(France) Paris Saint-Germain	2	0	0	2	1	6	−5	0.00
(Germany) Bayer Leverkusen	3	3	0	0	7	2	+5	100.00
(Germany) Bayern Munich	2	0	0	2	2	10	−8	0.00
(Germany) Borussia Dortmund	4	1	1	2	7	7	+0	25.00
(Germany) Eintracht Frankfurt	1	1	0	0	3	0	+3	100.00
(Germany) 1. FC Köln	2	1	1	0	2	1	+1	50.00
(Germany) RB Leipzig	2	0	1	1	1	3	−2	0.00
(Germany) VfB Stuttgart	1	1	0	0	2	0	+2	100.00
(Greece) OFI	2	1	0	1	2	1	+1	50.00
(Greece) Olympiacos	2	2	0	0	5	1	+4	100.00
(Israel) Hapoel Haifa	2	2	0	0	6	1	+5	100.00
(Israel) Hapoel Tel Aviv	2	1	1	0	1	0	+1	50.00
(Italy) Internazionale	2	0	1	1	0	2	−2	0.00
(Kazakhstan) Kairat	1	0	1	0	1	1	+0	0.00
(Netherlands) Ajax	3	1	1	1	3	4	−1	33.33
(Poland) Raków Częstochowa	2	2	0	0	6	0	+6	100.00
(Portugal) Sporting CP	8	4	3	1	12	8	+4	50.00
(Scotland) Celtic	1	0	1	0	0	0	+0	0.00
(Soviet Union) Spartak Moscow	2	0	1	1	0	2	−2	0.00
(Spain) Athletic Bilbao	1	0	0	1	2	3	−1	0.00
(Spain) Barcelona	1	0	1	0	2	2	+0	0.00
(Spain) Real Madrid	4	0	0	4	3	9	−6	0.00
(Spain) Valencia	2	2	0	0	8	4	+4	100.00
(Spain) Villarreal	2	0	1	1	4	5	−1	0.00
(Switzerland) Young Boys	3	2	1	0	10	4	+6	66.67
(Turkey) Fenerbahçe	2	2	0	0	5	1	+4	100.00
(Ukraine) Shakhtar Donetsk	3	2	0	1	7	2	+5	66.67
(Wales) Merthyr Tydfil	2	1	0	1	3	2	+1	50.00
