= 2024 UEFA Europa League final =

- Match programme cover
- Event: 2023–24 UEFA Europa League
Atalanta	Bayer Leverkusen
(Italy)	(Germany)
3	0
- Date: 22 May 2024
- Venue: Aviva Stadium, Dublin
- Man of the Match: Ademola Lookman (Atalanta)
- Referee: István Kovács (Romania)
- Attendance: 47,135
- Weather: Cloudy; 14 °C (57 °F); 77% humidity

The 2024 UEFA Europa League final was the final match of the 2023–24 UEFA Europa League, the 53rd season of Europe's secondary club football tournament organised by UEFA, and the 15th season since it was renamed from the UEFA Cup to the UEFA Europa League. It was held at the Aviva Stadium in Dublin, Ireland, on 22 May 2024, between Italian club Atalanta and German club Bayer Leverkusen.

Atalanta won the match 3–0 for their first European trophy and their first trophy in 61 years courtesy of a hat-trick by Ademola Lookman. In doing so, he became the first hat-trick scorer in a Europa League final, the first in a major European final since Jupp Heynckes in the 1975 UEFA Cup final second leg and the first in a single-match major European final since Pierino Prati in the 1969 European Cup final. Atalanta also became the 30th different club to win the UEFA Cup/Europa League, the first Italian club since Parma in 1999 to win the trophy and the first Italian side to win the competition since its rebranding before the 2009–10 season. Leverkusen, who had been unbeaten in 51 matches across all competitions in the season, became the first German side to lose a UEFA Cup/Europa League final since Werder Bremen in 2009.

As winners, Atalanta earned the right to play against Real Madrid, the winners of the 2023–24 UEFA Champions League, in the 2024 UEFA Super Cup. Since Atalanta had already qualified to enter the league phase of the 2024–25 UEFA Champions League through their league performance, the access list was rebalanced.

== Background ==
This was Atalanta's first ever European final. Having lost the 2024 Coppa Italia final, Atalanta failed to win a cup double, but were still seeking a first major title since winning the 1962–63 Coppa Italia. For Bayer Leverkusen, this was their third ever European showpiece match, the first European final since losing the 2002 UEFA Champions League final, and the first UEFA Cup/Europa League final since winning it in 1988. Having won the 2023–24 Bundesliga title and secured passage to the 2024 DFB-Pokal final, Leverkusen were aiming for a treble.

The final was only the third time the teams had met. Their first two matches were in the 2021–22 UEFA Europa League round of 16. Atalanta won both legs, 3–2 at home and 1–0 in the away game.

=== Previous finals ===
In the following table, the finals until 2009 were in the UEFA Cup era, and since 2010 in the UEFA Europa League era.

Team	Previous final appearances (bold indicates winners)
(Italy) Atalanta	None
(Germany) Bayer Leverkusen	1 (**1988**)

== Venue ==
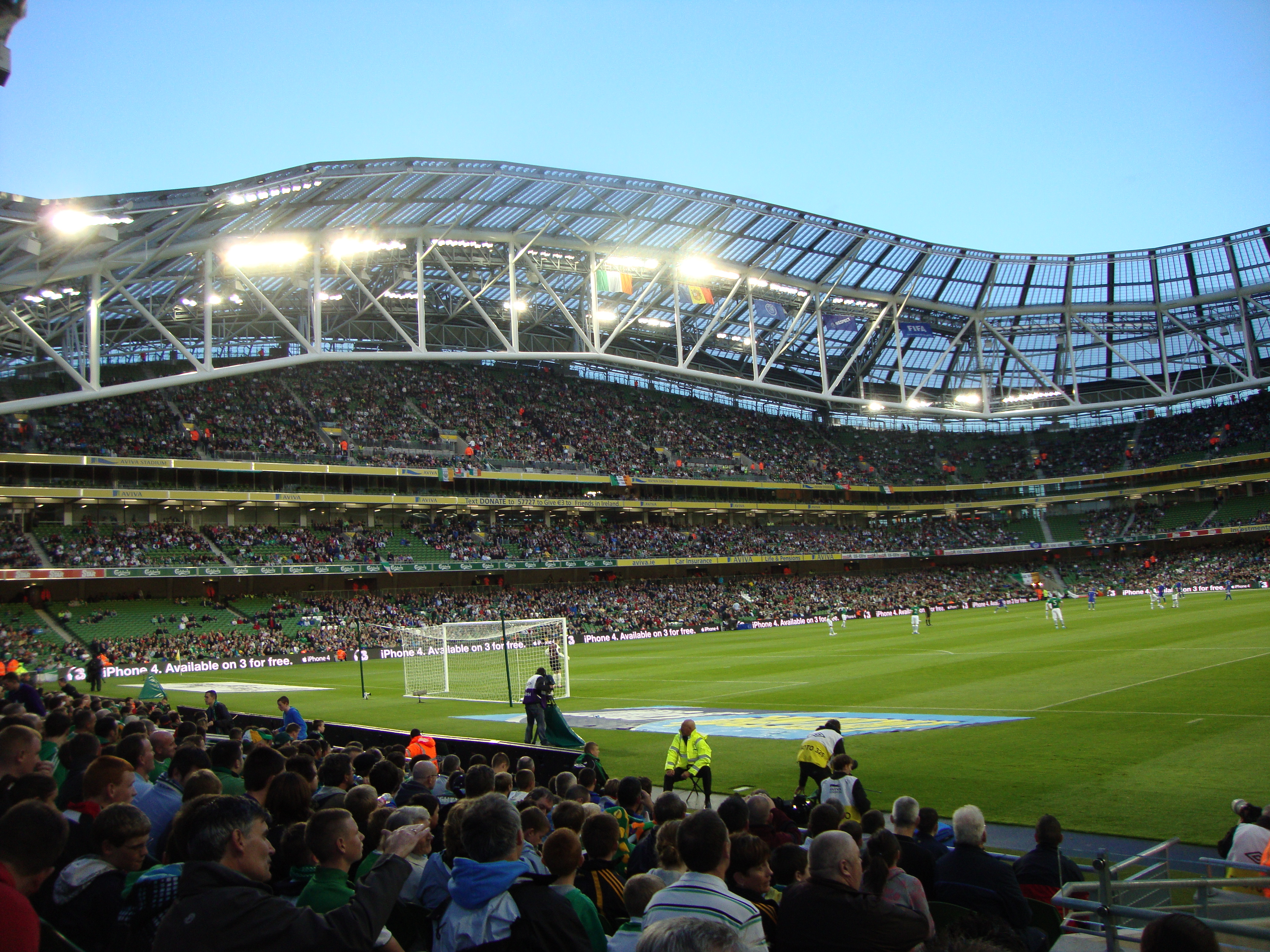
Aviva Stadium in Dublin hosted the final.

=== Host selection ===
On 16 July 2021, the UEFA Executive Committee announced that due to the withdrawal of hosting rights for UEFA Euro 2020, the Aviva Stadium in Dublin was given hosting rights for the 2024 final. This was part of a settlement agreement by UEFA to recognise the efforts and financial investment made to host UEFA Euro 2020.

It was the second time that the Europa League final has been held in the Aviva Stadium, having previously hosted the 2011 final.

== Route to the final ==
Note: In all results below, the score of the finalist is given first (H: home; A: away).

(Italy) Atalanta				Round	(Germany) Bayer Leverkusen			
Opponent	Result			Group stage	Opponent	Result		
(Poland) Raków Częstochowa	2–0 (H)			Matchday 1	(Sweden) BK Häcken	4–0 (H)		
(Portugal) Sporting CP	2–1 (A)			Matchday 2	(Norway) Molde	2–1 (A)		
(Austria) Sturm Graz	2–2 (A)			Matchday 3	(Azerbaijan) Qarabağ	5–1 (H)		
(Austria) Sturm Graz	1–0 (H)			Matchday 4	(Azerbaijan) Qarabağ	1–0 (A)		
(Portugal) Sporting CP	1–1 (H)			Matchday 5	(Sweden) BK Häcken	2–0 (A)		
(Poland) Raków Częstochowa	4–0 (A)			Matchday 6	(Norway) Molde	5–1 (H)		
Group D winners: Pos / Team / Pld / Pts; 1 / (Italy) Atalanta / 6 / 14; 2 / (Portugal) Sporting CP / 6 / 11; 3 / (Austria) Sturm Graz / 6 / 4; 4 / (Poland) Raków Częstochowa / 6 / 4; Source: UEFA				Final standings	Group H winners: Pos / Team / Pld / Pts; 1 / (Germany) Bayer Leverkusen / 6 / 18; 2 / (Azerbaijan) Qarabağ / 6 / 10; 3 / (Norway) Molde / 6 / 7; 4 / (Sweden) BK Häcken / 6 / 0; Source: UEFA			
Opponent	Agg.	1st leg	2nd leg	Knockout phase	Opponent	Agg.	1st leg	2nd leg
(Portugal) Sporting CP	3–2	1–1 (A)	2–1 (H)	Round of 16	(Azerbaijan) Qarabağ	5–4	2–2 (A)	3–2 (H)
(England) Liverpool	3–1	3–0 (A)	0–1 (H)	Quarter-finals	(England) West Ham United	3–1	2–0 (H)	1–1 (A)
(France) Marseille	4–1	1–1 (A)	3–0 (H)	Semi-finals	(Italy) Roma	4–2	2–0 (A)	2–2 (H)

=== Atalanta ===
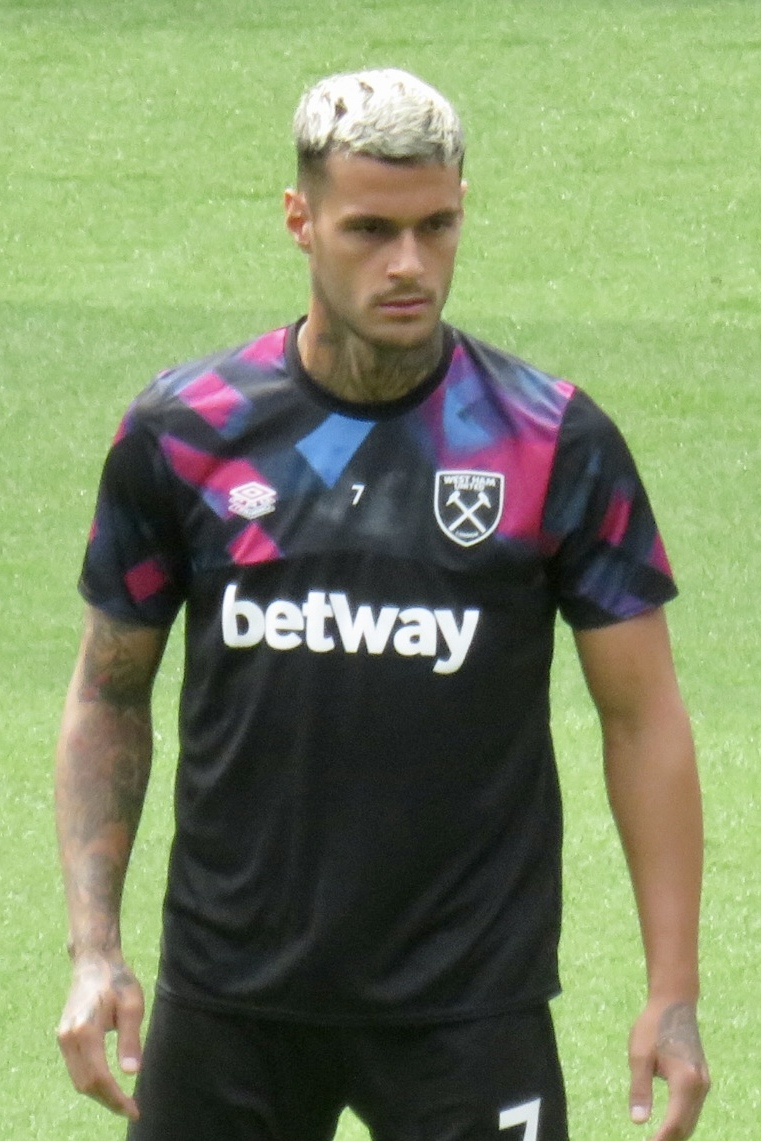
Atalanta forward Gianluca Scamacca was the top scorer in the competition for his club with 6 goals leading up to the final.

Atalanta qualified for the Europa League group stage by finishing 5th in the 2022–23 Serie A. They were drawn into Group D alongside Primeira Liga fourth-place team Sporting CP, Austrian Football Bundesliga second-place team Sturm Graz, and reigning Ekstraklasa champions Raków Częstochowa.

In Atalanta's opener of the group stage, they faced Raków Częstochowa at the Stadio di Bergamo and won 2–0, with goals from Charles De Ketelaere and Éderson. On matchday 2, Atalanta defeated Sporting CP away from home at the Estádio José Alvalade 2–1, with goals by Giorgio Scalvini and Matteo Ruggeri, and a goal from Viktor Gyökeres for the hosts. On matchday 3, Atalanta drew in a 2–2 stalemate at the Stadion Graz Liebenau against Sturm Graz. On matchday 4, Atalanta defeated Sturm Graz in the reverse fixture at the Stadio di Bergamo, with a goal from Berat Djimsiti. On matchday 5, Atalanta drew 1–1 with Sporting CP at home, with a goal from Gianluca Scamacca and Marcus Edwards for the visitors. On matchday 6 at the Zagłębiowski Park Sportowy, Atalanta grabbed a 4–0 away win against Raków Częstochowa, with two goals from Luis Muriel, and goals by Giovanni Bonfanti and Charles De Ketelaere.

In the round of 16, Atalanta were drawn against Sporting CP, a rematch from the group stage clash. In the first leg at the Estádio José Alvalade, Atalanta drew 1–1, with goals from Gianluca Scamacca and Paulinho. In the second leg, Atalanta defeated Sporting CP 2–1, with goals from Ademola Lookman and Gianluca Scamacca cancelling out Pedro Gonçalves' opener to win 3–2 on aggregate and advance to the quarter-finals.

In the quarter-finals, Atalanta were drawn against English club and tournament favourites Liverpool. In the first leg, Atalanta upset the English team 3–0 away at Anfield, with a brace from Gianluca Scamacca and a goal from Mario Pašalić, ending Liverpool's 34-game unbeaten run at home across all competitions. In the second leg, Atalanta lost 1–0 with a goal from Mohamed Salah, but the win in the second leg allowed Atalanta to advance 3–1 on aggregate.

In the semi-finals, Atalanta were drawn against French club Marseille. In the first leg at the Stade de Marseille, Atalanta drew 1–1, with goals from Gianluca Scamacca and Chancel Mbemba for the hosts. In the second leg at the Stadio di Bergamo, the hosts defeated Marseille 3–0, with goals from Ademola Lookman, Matteo Ruggeri, and El Bilal Touré. Atalanta won 4–1 on aggregate to qualify for their first European final.

=== Bayer Leverkusen ===
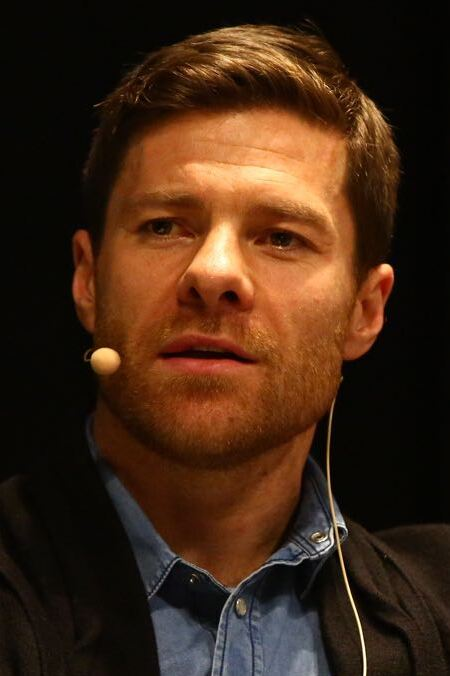
Bayer Leverkusen manager Xabi Alonso led his team to the longest unbeaten run across all competitions since the introduction of UEFA club competitions (1955–56), with a record of 51 matches unbeaten en route to the final.

Bayer Leverkusen qualified for the Europa League group stage by finishing 6th in the 2022–23 Bundesliga, due to RB Leipzig winning the 2022–23 DFB-Pokal while also qualifying for the Champions League based on league position, meaning the Europa League place was passed down to sixth place. Leverkusen were drawn into Group H alongside reigning Azerbaijan Premier League champions Qarabağ, Eliteserien fifth-place team Molde, and Allsvenskan third-place team BK Häcken.

In Leverkusen's opener of the group stage, they faced BK Häcken at the BayArena and won 4–0, with goals from Florian Wirtz, Amine Adli, Victor Boniface and Jonas Hofmann. On matchday 2, Leverkusen defeated Molde away from home at the Aker Stadion 2–1, with goals by Jeremie Frimpong and Nathan Tella, and a goal from Emil Breivik for the hosts. On matchday 3, Leverkusen were victorious again in a 5–1 thumping at home against Qarabağ. On matchday 4, Leverkusen defeated Qarabağ in the reverse fixture at the Tofiq Bahramov Republican Stadium, with a goal from Victor Boniface. On matchday 5, Leverkusen won 2–0 against BK Häcken at Ullevi, with goals from Victor Boniface and Patrik Schick for the visitors. On matchday 6 at the BayArena, Leverkusen grabbed a 5–1 win against Molde, with two goals from Adam Hložek, and goals by Patrik Schick and Edmond Tapsoba as well as an own goal by Martin Ellingsen.

In the round of 16, Leverkusen were drawn against Qarabağ, a rematch from the group stage clash. In the first leg at the Tofiq Bahramov Republican Stadium, Leverkusen drew 2–2, with goals from Florian Wirtz and Patrik Schick. In the second leg, Leverkusen defeated Qarabağ 3–2, with one goal from Jeremie Frimpong and two late goals from Patrik Schick cancelling out goals from Abdellah Zoubir and Juninho to win 5–4 on aggregate and advance to the quarter-finals.

In the quarter-finals, Leverkusen were drawn against English club and reigning Europa Conference League winners West Ham United. In the first leg, Leverkusen produced a 2–0 home win at BayArena, with two late goals coming from Jonas Hofmann and Victor Boniface. In the second leg, the match ended with a 1–1 draw, where despite Michail Antonio opened the scoring early for West Ham, Jeremie Frimpong equalised late on to ensure that the two goal advantage from the first leg was enough for Leverkusen to advance 3–1 on aggregate.

In the semi-finals, Leverkusen were drawn against Italian club Roma, runners-up of the previous edition. In the first leg at the Stadio Olimpico, Leverkusen won 2–0, with goals from Florian Wirtz and Robert Andrich enough for the away team to carry an advantage into the second leg. In the second leg at the BayArena, the hosts came from 2–0 down after 66 minutes, courtesy of a brace from Leandro Paredes, before scoring two goals late on via an own goal from Gianluca Mancini and a 97th minute goal from Josip Stanišić to draw the match 2–2. Leverkusen won 4–2 on aggregate and progressed to the Europa League final, while also setting a new European unbeaten record of 49 successive games, surpassing the Benfica side that was managed between December 1963 and February 1965.

== Pre-match ==
=== Identity ===
The original identity of the 2024 UEFA Europa League final was unveiled at the group stage draw on 1 September 2023.

=== Ambassador ===
The ambassador for the final was former Irish international John O'Shea who walked onto the pitch with the trophy before the match.

=== Ticketing ===
From a capacity of 48,000 seats, 36,000 were made available to the fans and the general public, of which both competing team's supporters received an allocation of 12,000 tickets each.

== Match ==
=== Summary ===
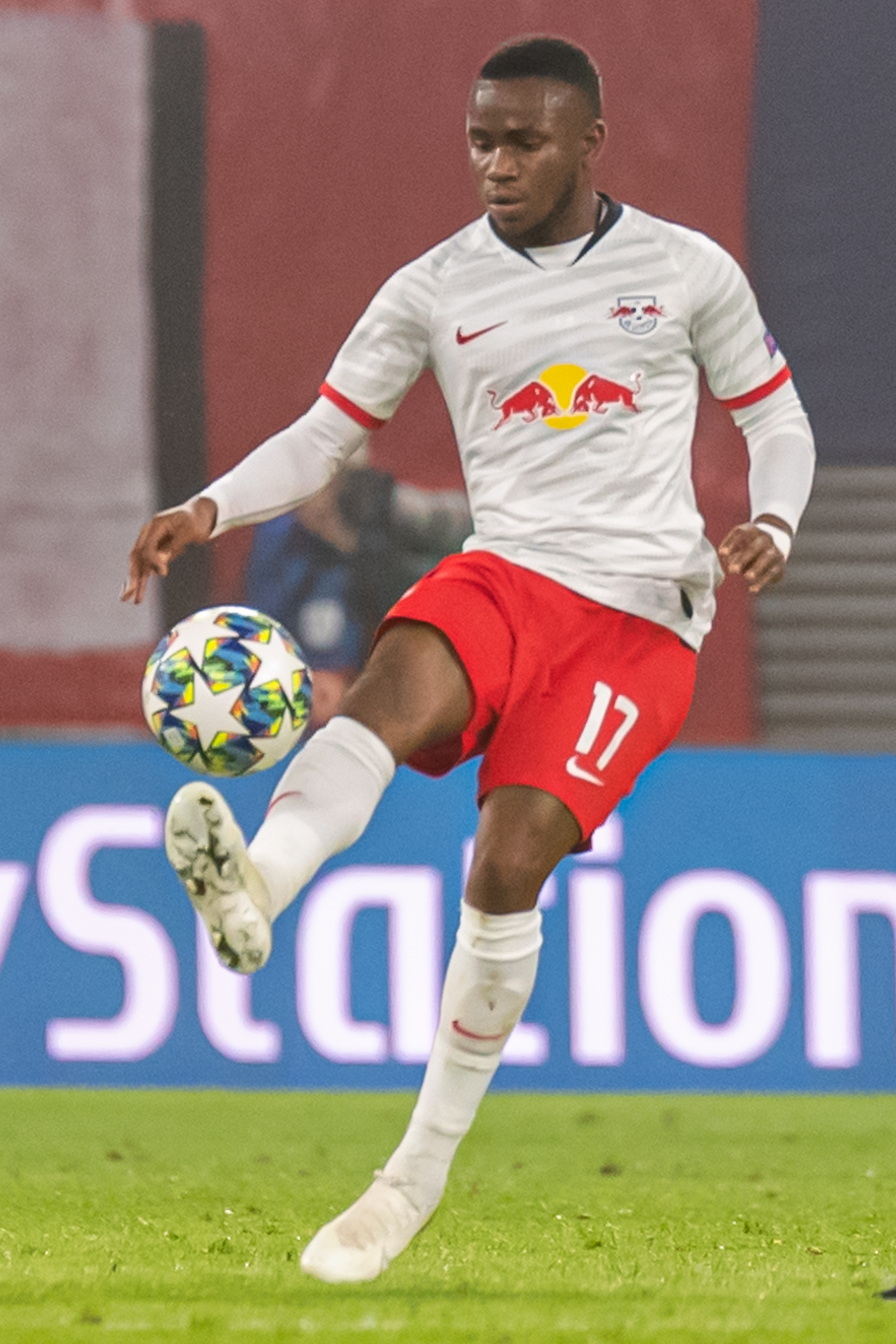
Atalanta forward Ademola Lookman was named man of the match after becoming the first person to score a hat-trick in a Europa League final.

In the 12th minute, Atalanta went in front after Teun Koopmeiners played a through-ball to Davide Zappacosta who then played the ball low across from the right where Ademola Lookman was lurking, and the Nigerian managed to run in front of Exequiel Palacios and strike the ball into the top left-hand corner of the net to give the Italian side the lead. Lookman doubled Atalanta's lead fourteen minutes later, after collecting the ball and dribbling past Granit Xhaka before striking his effort into the bottom right-hand corner of the net to make it 2–0. Leverkusen came close to getting a goal back after Álex Grimaldo was played through on goal by Palacios, but the Spaniard's attempted chip ended up safely in the hands of Juan Musso. Atalanta pushed for a third as the game progressed, with Charles De Ketelaere having an effort saved by Matěj Kovář, and Piero Hincapié forced to prevent a cross from Koopmeiners from reaching De Ketelaere. In the 75th minute, Lookman completed his hat-trick after receiving the ball from Gianluca Scamacca on the left before managing to find himself space and get a shot away, which ended up in the top right-hand corner of the net. The match ended with Atalanta winning 3–0, as they secured their first ever European title.

=== Details ===
The "home" team (for administrative purposes) was determined by an additional draw held after the quarter-final and semi-final draws.

22 May 2024
20:00 UTC+1

Atalanta (Italy)	3–0	(Germany) Bayer Leverkusen
Lookman 12', 26', 75'	Report

Aviva Stadium, Dublin
Attendance: 47,135
Referee: István Kovács (Romania)

Atalanta	Bayer Leverkusen

GK	1	(Argentina) Juan Musso
CB	19	(Albania) Berat Djimsiti (c)	(yellow card) 22'
CB	4	(Sweden) Isak Hien
CB	23	(Bosnia and Herzegovina) Sead Kolašinac		(substituted off) 46'
RM	77	(Italy) Davide Zappacosta	(yellow card) 60'	(substituted off) 84'
CM	13	(Brazil) Éderson
CM	7	(Netherlands) Teun Koopmeiners	(yellow card) 70'
LM	22	(Italy) Matteo Ruggeri		(substituted off) 90+1'
RF	17	(Belgium) Charles De Ketelaere		(substituted off) 57'
CF	90	(Italy) Gianluca Scamacca	(yellow card) 35'	(substituted off) 84'
LF	11	(Nigeria) Ademola Lookman
Substitutes:
GK	29	(Italy) Marco Carnesecchi
GK	31	(Italy) Francesco Rossi
DF	2	(Italy) Rafael Tolói		(substituted on) 90+1'
DF	42	(Italy) Giorgio Scalvini		(substituted on) 46'
MF	3	(Sweden) Emil Holm
MF	8	(Croatia) Mario Pašalić		(substituted on) 57'
MF	15	(Netherlands) Marten de Roon
MF	20	(Netherlands) Mitchel Bakker
MF	25	(France) Michel Ndary Adopo
MF	33	(Netherlands) Hans Hateboer		(substituted on) 84'
FW	10	(Mali) El Bilal Touré		(substituted on) 84'
FW	59	(Russia) Aleksei Miranchuk
Manager:
(Italy) Gian Piero Gasperini

GK	17	(Czech Republic) Matěj Kovář
CB	2	(Croatia) Josip Stanišić		(substituted off) 46'
CB	4	(Germany) Jonathan Tah (c)
CB	12	(Burkina Faso) Edmond Tapsoba	(yellow card) 67'
RM	30	(Netherlands) Jeremie Frimpong		(substituted off) 81'
CM	34	(Switzerland) Granit Xhaka
CM	25	(Argentina) Exequiel Palacios		(substituted off) 68'
LM	3	(Ecuador) Piero Hincapié
AM	10	(Germany) Florian Wirtz	(yellow card) 35'	(substituted off) 81'
CF	20	(Spain) Álex Grimaldo		(substituted off) 68'
CF	21	(Morocco) Amine Adli
Substitutes:
GK	1	(Finland) Lukas Hradecky
GK	36	(Germany) Niklas Lomb
DF	6	(Ivory Coast) Odilon Kossounou
DF	13	(Brazil) Arthur
MF	7	(Germany) Jonas Hofmann
MF	8	(Germany) Robert Andrich	(yellow card) 73'	(substituted on) 68'
MF	19	(Nigeria) Nathan Tella		(substituted on) 81'
MF	32	(Colombia) Gustavo Puerta
FW	9	(Spain) Borja Iglesias
FW	14	(Czech Republic) Patrik Schick		(substituted on) 81'
FW	22	(Nigeria) Victor Boniface		(substituted on) 46'
FW	23	(Czech Republic) Adam Hložek		(substituted on) 68'
Manager:
(Spain) Xabi Alonso

Man of the Match:
Ademola Lookman (Atalanta)

Assistant referees:
Vasile Marinescu (Romania)
Mihai Artene (Romania)
Fourth official:
Ivan Kružliak (Slovakia)
Reserve assistant referee:
Branislav Hancko (Slovakia)
Video assistant referee:
Pol van Boekel (Netherlands)
Assistant video assistant referee:
Cătălin Popa (Romania)
Support video assistant referee:
Rob Dieperink (Netherlands)

Match rules

- 90 minutes
- 30 minutes of extra time if necessary
- Penalty shoot-out if scores still level
- Maximum of twelve named substitutes
- Maximum of five substitutions, with a sixth allowed in extra time
- Maximum of three substitution opportunities, with a fourth allowed in extra time

=== Statistics ===
First half
Statistic	Atalanta	Bayer Leverkusen
Goals scored	2	0
Total shots	6	4
Shots on target	4	2
Saves	2	2
Ball possession	43%	57%
Corner kicks	1	1
Fouls committed	10	7
Offsides	0	0
Yellow cards	2	1
Red cards	0	0

Second half
Statistic	Atalanta	Bayer Leverkusen
Goals scored	1	0
Total shots	4	6
Shots on target	3	1
Saves	1	2
Ball possession	41%	59%
Corner kicks	1	4
Fouls committed	11	5
Offsides	1	0
Yellow cards	2	2
Red cards	0	0

Overall
Statistic	Atalanta	Bayer Leverkusen
Goals scored	3	0
Total shots	10	10
Shots on target	7	3
Saves	3	4
Ball possession	42%	58%
Corner kicks	2	5
Fouls committed	21	12
Offsides	1	0
Yellow cards	4	3
Red cards	0	0

== Post-match ==
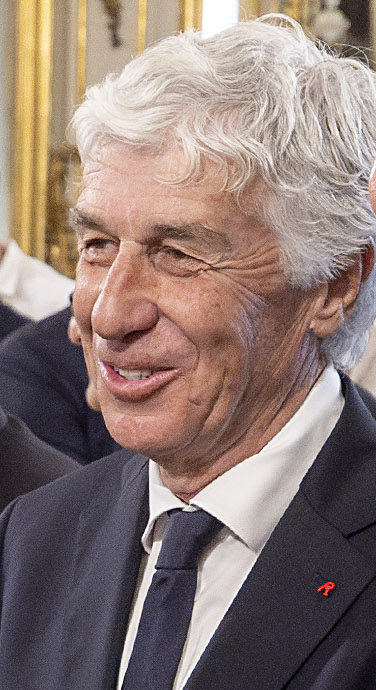
Atalanta manager Gian Piero Gasperini guided his team to their second major trophy, as well as his first.

With their victory, it gave Atalanta only the second major trophy in their 116-year history, over six decades after the Bergamo side had won the Coppa Italia in 1963. They were the tenth different Italian side to do so, second only to sides from England. Aged 66 years and 117 days, Atalanta manager Gian Piero Gasperini became the fourth oldest manager to win a major European trophy after Raymond Goethals, Jupp Heynckes, and Alex Ferguson. This was also the biggest margin of defeat for a German team in a major European final match since the 1993 UEFA Cup, when Borussia Dortmund lost 3–0 to Juventus in the second leg. In single-game only finals, it was the biggest margin of defeat for a German team since Eintracht Frankfurt lost 7–3 to Real Madrid in the 1960 European Cup final. Atalanta forward Ademola Lookman was selected as man of the match after scoring a hat-trick in the game. His treble was the sixth to be scored in a major UEFA final, and was the first since Heynckes' for Borussia Mönchengladbach against Twente in the 1975 second leg game, which was the only other one to be scored in a UEFA Cup/Europa League final. In a single-match major European final, it was the first hat-trick since Pierino Prati did so for another Italian side in Milan in the 1969 European Cup final.

Conversely, Bayer Leverkusen suffered their first and only defeat of their 2023–24 season. They had been unbeaten in all 51 of their matches in all competitions this term before the final. They nevertheless went on to win the 2024 DFB-Pokal final three days later, completing a domestic double.

The Mayor of Bergamo, Giorgio Gori said that an open top bus parade would be held to allow for celebrations in the city.

== See also ==
- 2024 UEFA Champions League final
- 2024 UEFA Europa Conference League final
- 2024 UEFA Women's Champions League final
- 2024 UEFA Super Cup
- Atalanta BC in European football
- Bayer 04 Leverkusen in European football
- 2023–24 Atalanta BC season
- 2023–24 Bayer 04 Leverkusen season
