= Diego Orejuela =

Spanish footballer (1962–2024)

Personal information
- Full name: Diego Orejuela Rodríguez
- Date of birth: 20 January 1962
- Place of birth: La Luisiana, Spain
- Date of death: 20 June 2024 (aged 62)
- Place of death: Barcelona, Spain
- Height: 1.85 m (6 ft 1 in)
- Position: Midfielder

Youth career
- 1976–1979: Español

Senior career*
Years	Team	Apps	(Gls)
1979–1991	Español	245	(14)
1979–1980	→ Figueres (loan)	29	(8)
1980–1981	→ Sabadell (loan)	16	(1)
1981–1982	→ Figueres (loan)		
1982	→ Lleida (loan)	5	(0)
1991–1993	Palamós	66	(7)
Total		361	(30)

International career
1978	Spain U18	3	(0)
1984	Spain U21	1	(0)
1984	Spain amateur	1	(0)
- * Club domestic league appearances and goals

Diego Orejuela Rodríguez (20 January 1962 – 20 June 2024) was a Spanish professional footballer who played as a midfielder.

He represented mainly Español in a 14-year career, making 303 competitive appearances and reaching the 1988 UEFA Cup final.

== Career ==
Born in La Luisiana, Province of Seville, Orejuela made his professional debut with RCD Español, being an undisputed starter since age 21 after serving four loans in the lower leagues, all in Catalonia, and remaining as such for the vast majority of his tenure. He scored two goals in the club's 1987–88 runner-up campaign in the UEFA Cup, against Inter Milan in the third round (1–0) and Club Brugge KV in the semi-finals (3–0 win following a 2–0 loss in Belgium), having also captained the team for a number of years.

After a last weak season in La Liga in 1990–91 – just 12 games, only two complete – Orejuela retired in 1993 at the age of 31, playing two years with Español neighbours Palamós CF in the Segunda División.

== Personal life and death ==
Orejuela's older brother, Jesús, was also a footballer; a striker, he represented in the top flight Espanyol (coinciding with Diego from 1982 to 1984), CA Osasuna and Real Zaragoza. Their cousin Antonio was also involved in the sport at the professional level.

Orejuela died in Barcelona on 20 June 2024 aged 62, from pancreatic cancer.

== Honours ==
Español

- UEFA Cup runner-up: 1987–88

Spain Under-21

- UEFA Under-21 European Championship runner-up: 1984
