= RCD Espanyol in European football =

Spanish club in European football

- Club: RCD Espanyol
- Seasons played: 10
- First entry: 1961–62 Inter-Cities Fairs Cup
- Latest entry: 2019–20 UEFA Europa League

RCD Espanyol in European football is an article about RCD Espanyol and their record in Europe football competitions. They have played the UEFA Cup/Europa League eight times, reaching the final twice and losing both on penalties. They also competed in the Inter-Cities Fairs Cup twice.

== History ==
Season	Competition	Round	Club	Home	Away	Play-off	Aggregate
1961–62	Inter-Cities Fairs Cup	First Round	(Germany) Hannover 96	2–0	1–0		3–0
1961–62	Inter-Cities Fairs Cup	Second Round	(England) Birmingham City	5–2	0–1		5–3
1961–62	Inter-Cities Fairs Cup	Quarter-finals	(Socialist Federal Republic of Yugoslavia) Red Star	2–1	0–5		2–6
1965–66	Inter-Cities Fairs Cup	First Round	(Portugal) Sporting CP	4–3	1–2	2–1	7–6
1965–66	Inter-Cities Fairs Cup	Second Round	(Romania) Steagul Roșu	3–1	2–4	1–0	6–5
1965–66	Inter-Cities Fairs Cup	Quarter-finals	(Spain) Barcelona	0–1	0–1		0–2
1973–74	UEFA Cup	First Round	(Belgium) RWD Molenbeek	0–3	2–1		2–4
1976–77	UEFA Cup	First Round	(France) Nice	3–1	1–2		4–3
1976–77	UEFA Cup	Second Round	(Germany) Eintracht Braunschweig	2–0	1–2		3–2
1976–77	UEFA Cup	Third round	(Netherlands) Feyenoord	0–1	0–2		0–3
1987–88	UEFA Cup	First Round	(Germany) Borussia Mönchengladbach	4–1	1–0		5–1
1987–88	UEFA Cup	Second Round	(Italy) Milan	0–0	2–0		2–0
1987–88	UEFA Cup	Third round	(Italy) Inter Milan	1–0	1–1		2–1
1987–88	UEFA Cup	Quarter-finals	(Czechoslovakia) Vítkovice	2–0	0–0		2–0
1987–88	UEFA Cup	Semi-finals	(Belgium) Club Brugge	3–0 (a.e.t.)	0–2		3–2
1987–88	UEFA Cup	Final	(Germany) Bayer 04 Leverkusen	3–0	0–3		3–3, 2–3 (p)
1996–97	UEFA Cup	First Round	(Cyprus) APOEL	1–0	2–2		3–2
1996–97	UEFA Cup	Second Round	(Netherlands) Feyenoord	0–3	1–0		1–3
1998	UEFA Intertoto Cup	Second Round	(Czech Republic) Zbrojovka Brno	2–0	3–5		5–5 (a)
1998	UEFA Intertoto Cup	Third round	(France) Auxerre	1–0	1–1		2–1
1998	UEFA Intertoto Cup	Semi–finals	(Spain) Valencia	0–1	0–2		0–3
1999	UEFA Intertoto Cup	Third round	(France) Montpellier	0–2	1–2		1–4
2000–01	UEFA Cup	First Round	(Slovenia) Olimpija Ljubljana	2–0	1–2		3–2
2000–01	UEFA Cup	Second Round	(Austria) Grazer AK	4–0	0–1		4–1
2000–01	UEFA Cup	Third Round	(Portugal) Porto	0–2	0–0		0–2
2005–06	UEFA Cup	First Round	(Czech Republic) Teplice	2–0	1–1		3–1
2005–06	UEFA Cup	Group B	(Russia) Lokomotiv Moscow	—N/a	1–0		2nd
2005–06	UEFA Cup	Group B	(Italy) Palermo	1–1	—N/a		2nd
2005–06	UEFA Cup	Group B	(Denmark) Brøndby	—N/a	1–1		2nd
2005–06	UEFA Cup	Group B	(Israel) Maccabi Petah Tikva	1–0	—N/a		2nd
2005–06	UEFA Cup	Round of 32	(Germany) Schalke 04	0–3	1–2		1–5
2006–07	UEFA Cup	First Round	(Slovakia) Petržalka	3–1	2–2		5–3
2006–07	UEFA Cup	Group F	(Czech Republic) Sparta Prague	—N/a	2–0		1st
2006–07	UEFA Cup	Group F	(Belgium) Zulte Waregem	6–2	—N/a		1st
2006–07	UEFA Cup	Group F	(Netherlands) Ajax	—N/a	2–0		1st
2006–07	UEFA Cup	Group F	Austria Wien	1–0	—N/a		1st
2006–07	UEFA Cup	Round of 32	(Italy) Livorno	2–0	2–1		4–1
2006–07	UEFA Cup	Round of 16	(Israel) Maccabi Haifa	4–0	0–0		4–0
2006–07	UEFA Cup	Quarter-finals	(Portugal) Benfica	3–2	0–0		3–2
2006–07	UEFA Cup	Semi-finals	(Germany) Werder Bremen	3–0	2–1		5–1
2006–07	UEFA Cup	Final	(Spain) Sevilla	2–2 (a.e.t.) (1–3 p.)			
2019–20	UEFA Europa League	QR2	(Iceland) Stjarnan	4–0	3–1		7–1
2019–20	UEFA Europa League	QR3	(Switzerland) Luzern	3–0	3–0		6–0
2019–20	UEFA Europa League	PO	(Ukraine) Zorya Luhansk	3–1	2–2		5–3
2019–20	UEFA Europa League	Group H	(Russia) CSKA Moscow	0–1	2–0		1st
2019–20	UEFA Europa League	Group H	(Bulgaria) Ludogorets Razgrad	6–0	1–0		1st
2019–20	UEFA Europa League	Group H	(Hungary) Ferencváros	1–1	2–2		1st
2019–20	UEFA Europa League	Round of 32	(England) Wolverhampton Wanderers	3–2	0–4		3–6

== Overall record ==
As of 11 July 2020

Competition	Pld	W	D	L	GF	GA	GD	Win%
UEFA Europa League	67	37	15	15	112	62	+50	55.22
UEFA Intertoto Cup	8	2	1	5	8	13	−5	25.00
Total	75	39	16	20	120	75	+45	52.00

Competition	Pld	W	D	L	GF	GA	GD	Win%
Non-UEFA competitions
Inter-Cities Fairs Cup	14	8	0	6	23	22	+1	57.14
Intertoto Cup	4	3	0	1	7	3	+4	75.00
Total	18	11	0	7	30	25	+5	61.11

== Other competitions ==
Season	Competition	Round	Club	Home	Away	Aggregate
1968	Intertoto Cup	Group A5	(Germany) 1860 Munich	2–0	1–2	1st
1968	Intertoto Cup	Group A5	Austria Wien	1–0	3–1	1st

== Year by Year Performance ==
Below is a table of the performance of RCD Espanyol in European competitions.

Season	Competition	Round	Against	Played	Won	Drew	Lost	Goals for	Goals against
1961–62	Inter-Cities Fairs Cup	Quarter final	(Socialist Federal Republic of Yugoslavia) Red Star Belgrade	6	4	0	2	10	9
1962–63 to 1964–65	Did not qualify For UEFA Competitions								
1965–66	Inter-Cities Fairs Cup	Quarter final	(Spain) Barcelona	8	4	0	4	13	13
1966–67 and 1967–68	Did not qualify For UEFA Competitions								
1968–69	Intertoto Cup	Winner (Group A5)	(Germany) 1860 Munich; Austria Wien	4	3	0	1	7	3
1969–70 to 1972–73	Did not qualify For UEFA Competitions								
1973–74	UEFA Cup	Last 64	(Belgium) Molenbeek	2	1	0	1	2	4
1974–75 and 1975–76	Did not qualify For UEFA Competitions								
1976–77	UEFA Cup	Last 16	(Netherlands) Feyenoord	6	2	0	4	7	8
1977–78 to 1986–87	Did not qualify For UEFA Competitions								
1987–88	UEFA Cup	Final	(Germany) Bayer Leverkusen	12	7	3	2	17	7
1988–89 to 1995–96	Did not qualify For UEFA Competitions								
1996–97	UEFA Cup	Last 32	(Netherlands) Feyenoord	4	2	1	1	4	5
1997–98	Did not qualify For UEFA Competitions								
1998–99	UEFA Intertoto Cup	Semi-finals	(Spain) Valencia	6	2	1	3	7	9
1999–00	UEFA Intertoto Cup	Third round	(France) Montpellier	2	0	0	2	1	4
2000–01	UEFA Cup	Last 32	(Portugal) Porto	6	2	1	3	7	5
2001–02 to 2004–05	Did not qualify For UEFA Competitions								
2005–06	UEFA Cup	Last 32	(Germany) Schalke 04	8	3	3	2	8	8
2006–07	UEFA Cup	Final	(Spain) Sevilla	15	11	4	0	34	11
2007–08 to 2018–19	Did not qualify For UEFA Competitions								
2019–20	UEFA Europa League	Last 32	(England) Wolverhampton Wanderers	14	9	3	2	33	15
