= Ivan Kružliak =

Slovak football referee

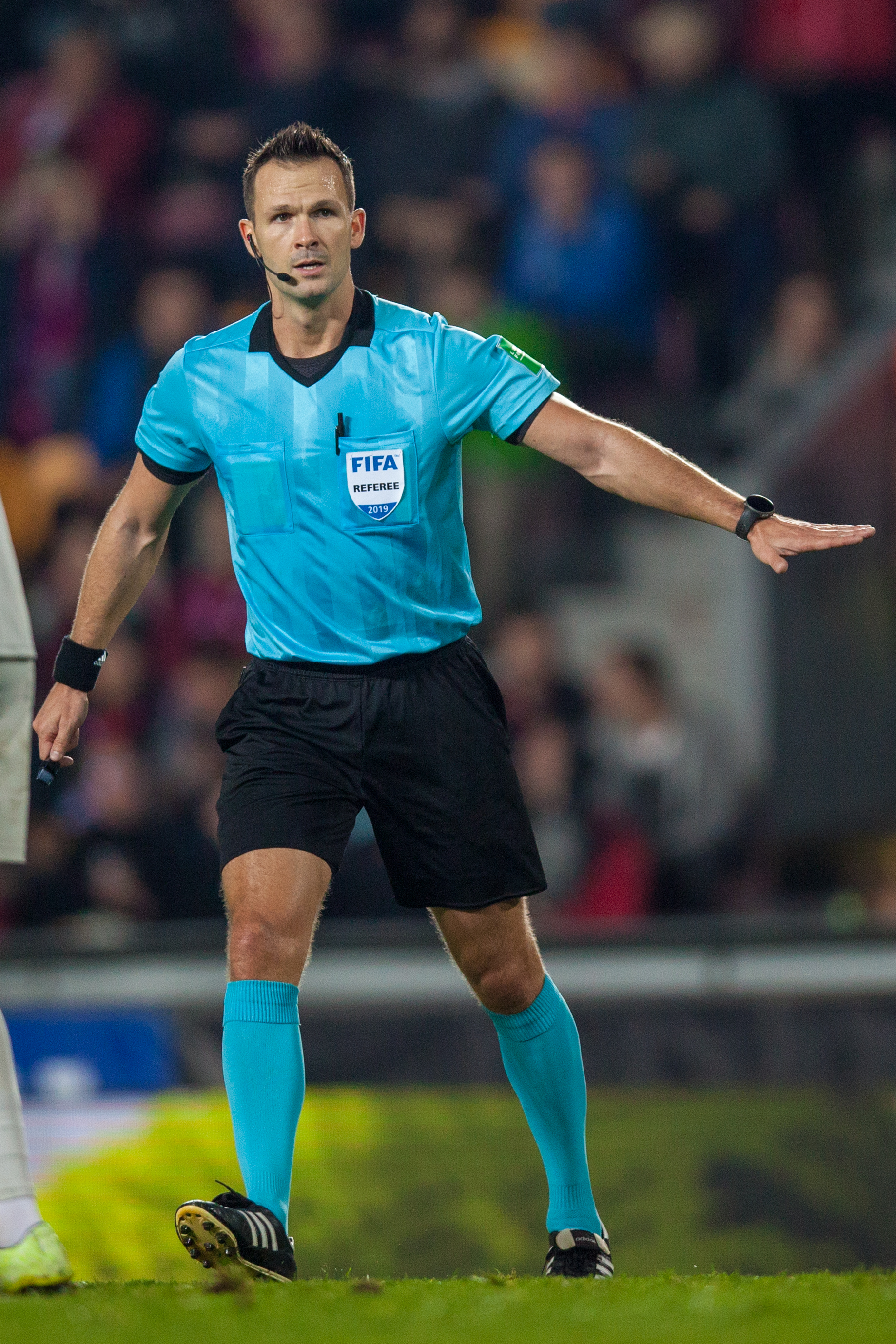
- Kružliak in 2019
- Born: 24 March 1984 (age 42); Bratislava, Czechoslovakia
- Citizenship: Slovak
- Occupation: Football referee

Ivan Kružliak (born 24 March 1984) is a Slovak football referee.

Kružliak mostly serves as referee in the Slovak First Football League and UEFA competitions: the Champions League, Europa League and Conference League. Kružliak has refereed in international matches, participating in World Cup Qualifiers in Europe, Euro Qualifications, UEFA Nations League and Euro 2024.

== Career ==
Kružliak served as referee in a 2014 FIFA World Cup qualification match between England and Moldova at the Wembley Stadium, which ended in a 4–0 victory for the former.

In May 2024, Kružliak was appointed by UEFA as the fourth official for the 2024 UEFA Europa League final between Atalanta and Bayer Leverkusen. Having taken charge of matches in UEFA club competitions including the Champions League and the Europa League, he was selected for his first major international tournament as a referee for Euro 2024. He is the only Slovak referee in UEFA's elite category for 2026.

== See also ==
- List of FIFA international referees
