= Joan Golobart =

Spanish footballer

Personal information
- Full name: Joan Golobart Serra
- Date of birth: 12 January 1961 (age 65)
- Place of birth: Barcelona, Spain
- Height: 1.84 m (6 ft 0 in)
- Position: Defensive midfielder

Youth career
- 1978–1980: AE Sarrià

Senior career*
Years	Team	Apps	(Gls)
1980–1983	Hospitalet		
1983–1985	Sabadell	65	(12)
1985–1990	Español	79	(4)
1985–1986	→ Hospitalet (loan)	19	(6)
Total		163+	(22+)
- * Club domestic league appearances and goals

Joan Golobart Serra (born 12 January 1961) is a Spanish former professional footballer who played mainly as a defensive midfielder.

== Playing career ==
Born in Barcelona, Catalonia, Golobart did not start playing organised football until he was 17, making his senior debut for local CE L'Hospitalet in the Tercera División as a winger. In 1985, after two seasons with neighbours CE Sabadell FC – helping to promotion to Segunda División in his first year and scoring five goals in 30 games in the second – he signed for another side in the region, RCD Español who he supported as a child.

During his five-season spell, Golobart was successfully reconverted from central defender to defensive midfielder. He only had one solid campaign, however, contributing 35 matches and four goals in 1986–87 as the Pericos finished third in La Liga and qualified for the UEFA Cup, reaching and losing the final to Bayer 04 Leverkusen on penalties.

Golobart scored a rare goal in the promotion/relegation playoffs of 1988–89 against RCD Mallorca, but his team went down 2–1 on aggregate. After achieving immediate promotion (although he only appeared in eight matches), he did not have his contract renewed and chose to retire rather than represent another club than Español; he was only 29.

== Post-retirement ==
After retiring, Golobart worked in dentistry. Additionally, he became a respected sports analyst, writing newspaper columns for La Vanguardia.

Golobart unsuccessfully ran for Espanyol's presidency in 2007.

== Personal life ==
Golobart's son, Román, was also a footballer. He spent most of his career with Wigan Athletic, having been brought up at Espanyol.
