= Jean-Pierre de Keyser =

German footballer

Personal information
- Date of birth: 13 April 1965 (age 61)
- Height: 1.83 m (6 ft 0 in)
- Position: Defender

Youth career
- TSC Euskirchen
- SV Siegburg 04
- Bayer 04 Leverkusen

Senior career*
Years	Team	Apps	(Gls)
–1986	Bayer 04 Leverkusen II		
1986–1990	Bayer 04 Leverkusen	81	(1)
1991–1992	VfL Osnabrück	35	(0)
- * Club domestic league appearances and goals

Jean-Pierre de Keyser (born 13 April 1965) is a retired German football player.

== Honours ==
- UEFA Cup winner: 1987–88
