= Klaus Täuber =

German footballer (1958–2023)

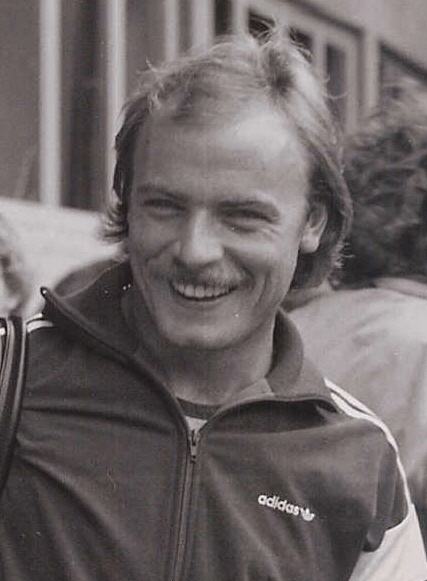
- Täuber in 1985

Personal information
- Date of birth: 17 January 1958
- Place of birth: Erlangen, Bavaria, West Germany
- Date of death: 1 July 2023 (aged 65)
- Height: 1.83 m (6 ft 0 in)
- Position: Forward

Youth career
- SpVgg Erlangen

Senior career*
| Years | Team | Apps | (Gls) |
| 1976–1980 | 1. FC Nürnberg | 79 | (24) |
| 1980–1983 | Stuttgarter Kickers | 99 | (49) |
| 1983–1987 | Schalke 04 | 125 | (58) |
| 1987–1989 | Bayer Leverkusen | 31 | (8) |
| Total | | 334 | (139) |

Managerial career
- 1991–1992: FC Rhade
- 1992–1993: Jahn Regensburg
- 1995–2002: Schalke 04 (A)
- 2004–2006: Schwarz-Weiß Essen
- 2007–2010: VfB Hüls
- 2010–2011: Westfalia Herne
- * Club domestic league appearances and goals

Klaus Täuber (17 January 1958 – 1 July 2023) was a German professional footballer who played as a forward for SpVgg Erlangen, 1. FC Nürnberg, Stuttgarter Kickers, Schalke 04, and Bayer Leverkusen. His brothers – Jürgen and Stephan – were also professional footballers.

Täuber died on 1 July 2023, at the age of 65.

== Honours ==
=== Player ===
Bayer Leverkusen

- UEFA Cup: 1987–88
