= Javier Clemente =

Spanish footballer

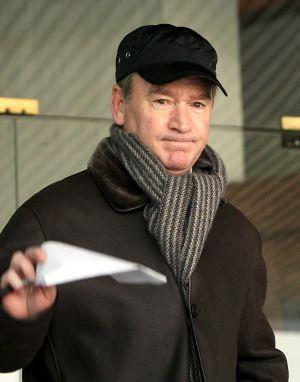
- Clemente in 2008

Personal information
- Full name: Javier Clemente Lázaro
- Date of birth: 12 March 1950 (age 76)
- Place of birth: Barakaldo, Spain
- Height: 1.71 m (5 ft 7 in)
- Position: Midfielder

Youth career
- Barakaldo
- 1966–1968: Athletic Bilbao

Senior career*
| Years | Team | Apps | (Gls) |
| 1968–1973 | Athletic Bilbao | 47 | (6) |
| 1973–1974 | Bilbao Athletic | 7 | (0) |
| Total | | 54 | (6) |

International career
| 1968 | Spain U18 | 2 | (0) |
| 1969–1970 | Spain U23 | 2 | (1) |

Managerial career
- 1975–1976: Arenas Getxo
- 1976–1978: Basconia
- 1979–1981: Bilbao Athletic
- 1981–1986: Athletic Bilbao
- 1986–1989: Español
- 1989–1990: Atlético Madrid
- 1990–1991: Athletic Bilbao
- 1991–1992: Español
- 1992–1996: Spain U21
- 1992–1998: Spain
- 1998–1999: Betis
- 1999–2000: Real Sociedad
- 2000–2001: Marseille
- 2002: Tenerife
- 2002–2003: Espanyol
- 2005–2006: Athletic Bilbao
- 2006–2007: Serbia
- 2008: Murcia
- 2010: Valladolid
- 2010–2011: Cameroon
- 2012: Sporting Gijón
- 2013–2016: Libya
- 2019–2021: Basque Country
- 2021–2022: Libya
Medal record
Men's football
Representing Spain (as manager)
UEFA European Under-21 Championship
| Runner-up | 1996 |
Representing Libya (as manager)
African Nations Championship
| Winner | 2014 |
- * Club domestic league appearances and goals

Javier Clemente Lázaro (Spanish pronunciation: [xaˈβjeɾ kleˈmente ˈlaθaɾo]; born 12 March 1950) is a Spanish football manager and former player who played as a midfielder.

Forced to retire from playing in his early 20s through injury, he embarked on a coaching career with his first managerial appointment coming in 1975. Over the next four decades, he took charge of several club and national teams, including Athletic Bilbao which he also represented as a player, as well as Espanyol and Spain. He won the La Liga championship in 1983 and 1984 with the former.

Nicknamed El rubio de Barakaldo (The blond from Barakaldo) per his hair colour and town of origin, Clemente coached the Spain national team in two World Cups and Euro 1996.

== Playing career ==
Born in Barakaldo, Biscay, Clemente joined Athletic Bilbao's youth system at the age of 16, from local Barakaldo CF. He was propelled to the first team at only 18 by manager Agustín Gaínza, making his official debut against Liverpool in that season's Inter-Cities Fairs Cup (2–1 home win, 3–3 aggregate triumph); along with fellow teenage newcomer José María Igartua, he was selected for the 1969 Copa del Generalísimo final, a 1–0 victory over Elche CF in Madrid.

Clemente's best La Liga output with his only club consisted of 18 games in the 1969–70 campaign. On 23 November 1969, during a league match against CE Sabadell FC, he suffered a serious leg injury (fibula and tibia) from which he never fully recovered; after four unsuccessful operations, he retired aged just 24.

== Coaching career ==
=== Beginnings and Athletic ===
Clemente started coaching immediately after retiring. His first stops were with local Arenas Club de Getxo, CD Basconia and Athletic's reserves.

In summer 1981, 31-year-old Clemente was appointed at Athletic Bilbao. He led the side to back-to-back national championships in his second and third years but, during this timeframe, also began a bitter rivalry with César Luis Menotti and his FC Barcelona – the Argentine criticised his playing style as authoritarian and his teams as defensive and destructive, and the Spaniard in turn dismissed Menotti as an ageing hippy and womaniser; the culmination of this was the 1984 final of the Copa del Rey, which ended in a massive brawl between the two sets of players.

Clemente left the Lions midway through the 1985–86 season, after a run-in with star player Manuel Sarabia. He was subsequently appointed at RCD Español in the same league, leading them to a best-ever third place in 1987 and the final of the UEFA Cup the next year, but being relieved of his duties in March 1989 after questioning his squad's desire – the campaign eventually ended in relegation for the Catalans.

In the following years, Clemente had incomplete top-flight spells with Atlético Madrid, a return to Athletic Bilbao and Español.

=== Spain national team ===
In 1992 Clemente was appointed manager of Spain, replacing Vicente Miera after the nation had failed to qualify for UEFA Euro 1992. His first game in charge was a 1–0 friendly win over England on 9 September, and he led the country to the following three major international tournaments, the 1994 and 1998 FIFA World Cups and Euro 1996, being eliminated in the group stage of the second competition and having a run of 31 matches without defeat.

Clemente's last game in charge was on 5 September 1998, a 3–2 defeat in Cyprus for the Euro 2000 qualifiers.

=== La Liga and France ===
Clemente returned to club action after his national team dismissal, working in the main division with Real Betis, Real Sociedad, CD Tenerife, Espanyol for a second time, a one-season spell in Ligue 1 with Olympique de Marseille, and back with Athletic Bilbao. He helped the latter avoid relegation in the 2005–06 season but, shortly before the new campaign started, was fired after a disagreement with chairman Fernando Lamikiz.

Over his three spells in charge at San Mamés, Clemente was manager in 289 official matches, which set a club record. This was broken in 2017 by Ernesto Valverde, who also surpassed his total of 211 league matches managed, finishing on 228, but was unable to match his record of victories: the former won 141 games – 102 in the league – while the latter came up one short, with 140 and 101.

=== Serbia ===
Clemente became manager of the Serbia national team on 21 July 2006, being brought in on initiative from Serbian Football Association president Zvezdan Terzić. According to local media his salary was €30,000 per month on a two-year contract, worth €720,000 in total – also, he was eligible for a €400,000 bonus if the country qualified for Euro 2008, and an additional €150,000 bonus for every round passed at the tournament; in an interview given to Serbian daily Politika, he claimed his current was the lowest wage he had earned in the last 20 years.

Clemente made his debut on 16 August 2006 in a 3–1 away friendly victory with Czech Republic. New players introduced into the squad included Danko Lazović, Marko Pantelić, Vladimir Stojković and Aleksandar Trišović, while previous mainstays such as Predrag Đorđević, Dragoslav Jevrić, Mateja Kežman, Savo Milošević and Albert Nađ were dropped. The continental qualification campaign started with three home wins, over Azerbaijan, Belgium and Armenia, and a draw in Poland from the first four matches; however, things started to go wrong with a 2–1 defeat in Kazakhstan in March 2007, and the nation eventually trailed Poland and Portugal in Group A, with the manager questioning the side's mental approach in the process.

Following the failure to qualify, Clemente was released from his contract on 6 December 2007.

=== Cameroon and return to Spain ===
On 17 August 2010, following spells in his country with Real Murcia CF (top tier and Segunda División) and Real Valladolid (eight games in charge, top-flight relegation), Clemente was named as the new coach of Cameroon, taking over from Paul Le Guen who stepped down after three losses in as many games in the 2010 World Cup. He made his debut with the Lions Indomptables on 4 September in a 3–1 away win against Mauritius in the first match of the 2012 Africa Cup of Nations qualifiers. However, the nation finished second behind Senegal and thus failed to reach the finals in Gabon and Equatorial Guinea, and he was dismissed on 25 October 2011.

On 13 February 2012, Clemente signed as the new manager of Sporting de Gijón, with a contract running until the end of the season. He left the Asturians in May, following their relegation; in the process he celebrated his 500th game in the Spanish first division, a 2–1 away loss to Granada CF.

=== Libya ===
On 20 September 2013, Clemente was named manager of Libya, taking over from Abdul-Hafeedh Arbeesh who was fired after a 1–0 defeat to Cameroon for the 2014 World Cup qualifying campaign. He led the nation to its first silverware, the 2014 African Nations Championship, with a penalty shootout win over Ghana in the final in Cape Town. Later that year, the team withdrew from their hosting duty for the 2017 Africa Cup of Nations due to civil war.

Clemente was sacked by the Mediterranean Knights in October 2016, having won only three of 14 matches.

=== Basque Country ===
On 6 March 2019, Clemente was appointed as manager for the unofficial national team of the Basque Country. At his presentation, he spoke of plans to invite players with Basque heritage to play for the team, in line with the grandfather rule used by FIFA national teams.

=== Return to Libya ===
Clemente was re-appointed as head coach of Libya in May 2021. After failing to qualify for the 2021 FIFA Arab Cup and the 2022 World Cup, his one-year contract was allowed to expire, with compatriot Ramón Catalá seeing out the final weeks.

== Managerial statistics ==
As of 29 March 2022

| Team | Nat | Year | Record | | | | |
| Team | Nat | Year | P | W | D | L | Win % |
|---|---|---|---|---|---|---|---|
| Arenas Getxo | (Spain) | 1975–1976 | 38 | 20 | 9 | 9 | 52.63 |
| Basconia | (Spain) | 1976–1978 | 76 | 26 | 11 | 39 | 34.21 |
| Bilbao Athletic | (Spain) | 1979–1981 | 76 | 30 | 21 | 25 | 39.47 |
| Athletic Bilbao | (Spain) | 1981–1986 | 213 | 117 | 44 | 52 | 54.93 |
| Español | (Spain) | 1986–1989 | 124 | 41 | 27 | 56 | 33.06 |
| Atlético Madrid | (Spain) | 1989–1990 | 32 | 15 | 8 | 9 | 46.88 |
| Athletic Bilbao | (Spain) | 1990–1991 | 31 | 11 | 3 | 17 | 35.48 |
| Español | (Spain) | 1992 | 22 | 10 | 4 | 8 | 45.45 |
| Spain U21 | (Spain) | 1992–1996 | 12 | 4 | 4 | 4 | 33.33 |
| Spain | (Spain) | 1992–1998 | 62 | 36 | 20 | 6 | 58.06 |
| Betis | (Spain) | 1998–1999 | 36 | 15 | 15 | 6 | 41.67 |
| Real Sociedad | (Spain) | 1999–2000 | 37 | 10 | 13 | 14 | 27.03 |
| Marseille | (France) | 2000–2001 | 27 | 8 | 5 | 14 | 29.63 |
| Tenerife | (Spain) | 2002 | 12 | 4 | 2 | 6 | 33.33 |
| Espanyol | (Spain) | 2002–2003 | 35 | 9 | 14 | 12 | 25.71 |
| Athletic Bilbao | (Spain) | 2005–2006 | 31 | 11 | 3 | 17 | 35.48 |
| Serbia | (Serbia) | 2006–2007 | 16 | 7 | 7 | 2 | 43.75 |
| Murcia | (Spain) | 2008 | 31 | 6 | 6 | 19 | 19.35 |
| Valladolid | (Spain) | 2010 | 8 | 3 | 3 | 2 | 37.50 |
| Cameroon | (Cameroon) | 2010–2011 | 8 | 4 | 3 | 1 | 50.00 |
| Sporting Gijón | (Spain) | 2012 | 16 | 5 | 3 | 8 | 31.25 |
| Libya | (Libya) | 2013–2016 | 13 | 3 | 6 | 4 | 23.08 |
| Basque Country | (Spain) | 2019–2021 | 2 | 1 | 1 | 0 | 50.00 |
| Libya | (Libya) | 2021–2022 | 11 | 4 | 1 | 6 | 36.36 |
| Career total | | | 969 | 400 | 233 | 336 | 41.28 |

== Honours ==
=== Player ===
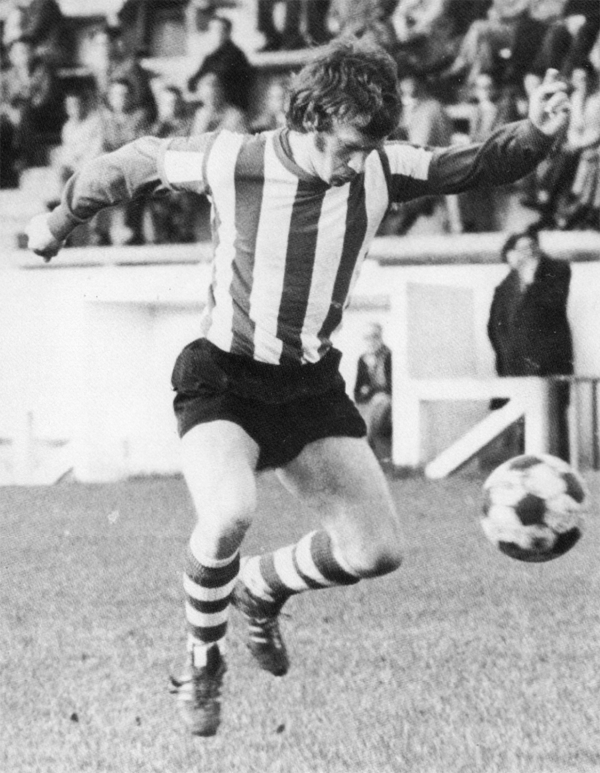
Clemente playing for Athletic Bilbao in 1970

Athletic Bilbao

- Copa del Rey: 1969

=== Manager ===
Athletic Bilbao

- La Liga: 1982–83, 1983–84
- Copa del Rey: 1983–84; runner-up: 1984–85
- Supercopa de España: 1984

Spain U21

- UEFA European Under-21 Championship runner-up: 1996

Libya

- African Nations Championship: 2014

Individual

- Don Balón Award: 1982–83, 1983–84, 1986–87
