= 2023–24 UEFA Europa League =

European football tournament

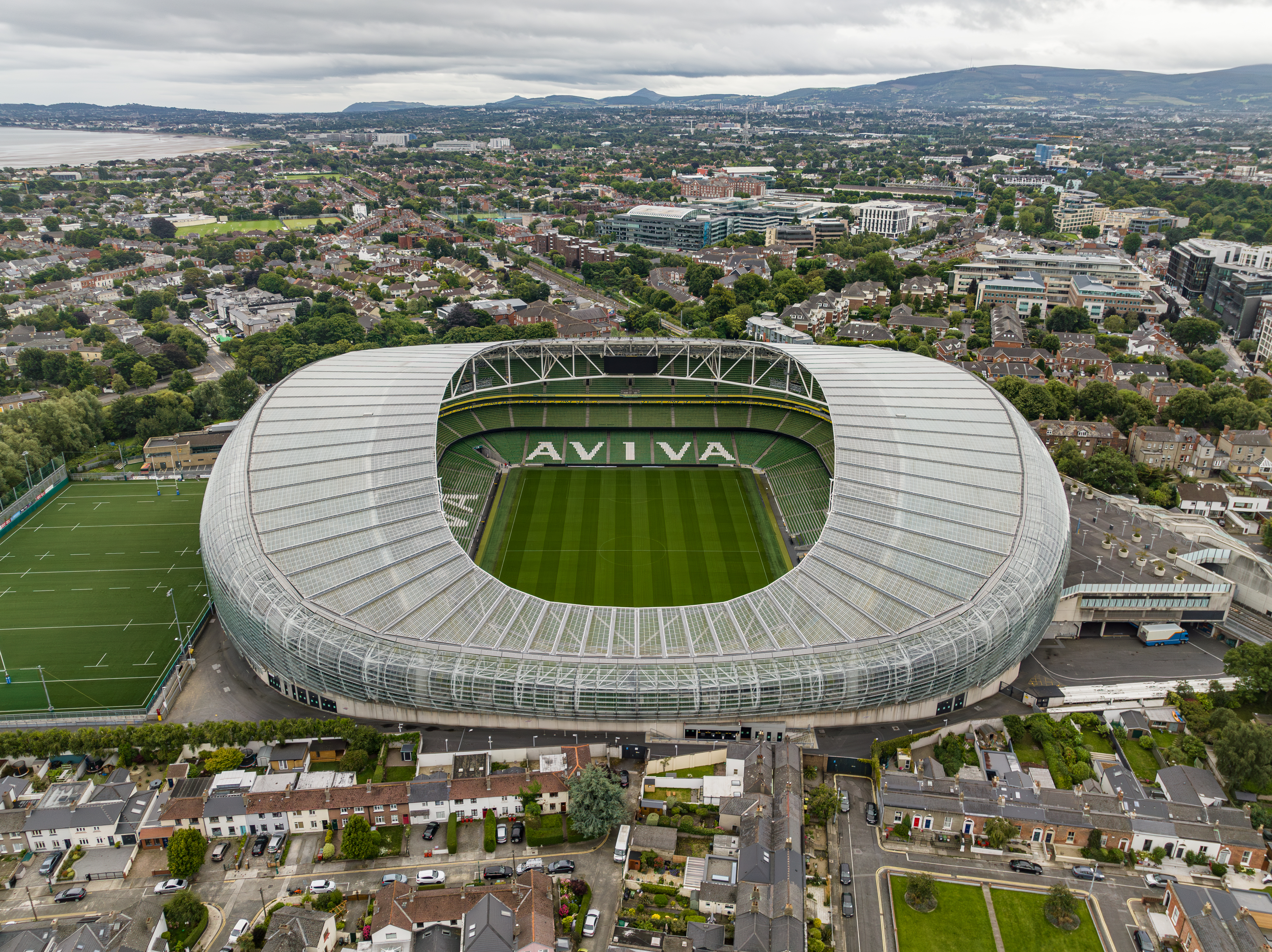
- The Aviva Stadium in Dublin hosted the final

Tournament details
- Dates: Qualifying: 8–31 August 2023; Competition proper: 21 September 2023 – 22 May 2024
- Teams: Competition proper: 32+8; Total: 21+36 (from 32 associations)

Final positions
- Champions: (Italy) Atalanta (1st title)
- Runners-up: (Germany) Bayer Leverkusen

Tournament statistics
- Matches played: 141
- Goals scored: 439 (3.11 per match)
- Attendance: 4,370,262 (30,995 per match)
- Top scorer(s): Pierre-Emerick Aubameyang (Marseille); 10 goals
- Best player: Pierre-Emerick Aubameyang (Marseille)
- Best young player: Florian Wirtz (Bayer Leverkusen)

The 2023–24 UEFA Europa League was the 53rd season of Europe's secondary club football tournament organised by UEFA, and the 15th season since it was renamed from the UEFA Cup to the UEFA Europa League.

The final was played at Aviva Stadium in Dublin, Republic of Ireland, with Italian club Atalanta defeating German club Bayer Leverkusen 3–0 to win their first European title. Atalanta became the first Italian team to win the competition since Parma in 1999. Their win also denied Leverkusen's bid to win a treble and complete the entire season unbeaten across all competitions. As winners of the tournament, Atalanta automatically qualified for the 2024–25 UEFA Champions League league stage and also earned the right to play against Real Madrid, the winners of the 2023–24 UEFA Champions League, in the 2024 UEFA Super Cup.

This edition was the final season with the format of 32 teams participating in the group stage, after UEFA announced that a brand new format would be introduced for the following edition. Due to the format change, no clubs can be transferred from the Champions League group stage to the UEFA Europa League under the Swiss format, and this edition's winners onwards will no longer be able to defend the title.

Sevilla were the defending champions, but could not defend their title after being eliminated in the group stage of the 2023–24 UEFA Champions League.

== Association team allocation ==
A total of 57 teams from 34 of the 55 UEFA member associations participated in the 2023–24 UEFA Europa League. Among them, 15 associations had teams directly qualifying for the Europa League, while for the other 40 associations that did not have any teams directly qualifying, 19 of them have teams playing after being transferred from the Champions League (the only member association which could not have a participant was Liechtenstein, which did not organise a domestic league, and could only enter their cup winner into the Europa Conference League given their association ranking). The association ranking based on the UEFA country coefficients was used to determine the number of participating teams for each association:

- The title holders of the UEFA Europa Conference League were given an entry in the Europa League (if they did not qualify for the Champions League through league performance).
- Associations 1–5 each had two teams qualify.
- Associations 6–16 (except Russia) each had one team qualify.
- 36 teams eliminated from the 2023–24 UEFA Champions League were transferred to the Europa League.

=== Association ranking ===
For the 2023–24 UEFA Europa League, the associations were allocated places according to their 2022 UEFA country coefficients, which took into account their performance in European competitions from 2017–18 to 2021–22.

Apart from the allocation based on the country coefficients, associations could have additional teams participating in the Europa League, as noted below:

- (UCL) – Additional teams transferred from the UEFA Champions League
- (UECL) – Additional berth for UEFA Europa Conference League title holders

Association ranking for 2023–24 UEFA Europa League

Rank	Association	Coeff.	Teams	Notes
1	England	106.641	2	+1 (UECL)
2	Spain	96.141	2	
3	Italy	76.902	2	+1 (UCL)
4	Germany	75.213	2	
5	France	60.081	2	+2 (UCL)
6	Portugal	53.382	1	+2 (UCL)
7	Netherlands	49.300	1	+1 (UCL)
8	Austria	38.850	1	+1 (UCL)
9	Scotland	36.900	1	+1 (UCL)
10	Russia	34.482	0	
11	Serbia	33.375	1	+1 (UCL)
12	Ukraine	31.800	1	+2 (UCL)
13	Belgium	30.600	1	+1 (UCL)
14	Switzerland	29.675	1	+2 (UCL)
15	Greece	28.200	1	+2 (UCL)
16	Czech Republic	27.800	1	+1 (UCL)
17	Norway	27.250	0	+1 (UCL)
18	Denmark	27.175	0	
19	Croatia	27.150	0	+1 (UCL)

Rank	Association	Coeff.	Teams	Notes
20	Turkey	27.100	0	+1 (UCL)
21	Cyprus	26.375	0	+1 (UCL)
22	Israel	24.375	0	+1 (UCL)
23	Sweden	22.875	0	+1 (UCL)
24	Bulgaria	19.500	0	+1 (UCL)
25	Romania	17.150	0	
26	Azerbaijan	17.000	0	+1 (UCL)
27	Hungary	16.375	0	
28	Poland	15.875	0	+1 (UCL)
29	Kazakhstan	15.750	0	+1 (UCL)
30	Slovakia	15.625	0	+1 (UCL)
31	Slovenia	15.000	0	+1 (UCL)
32	Belarus	12.500	0	+1 (UCL)
33	Moldova	11.250	0	+1 (UCL)
34	Lithuania	10.000	0	+1 (UCL)
35	Bosnia and Herzegovina	9.125	0	+1 (UCL)
36	Finland	8.875	0	+1 (UCL)
37	Luxembourg	8.750	0	
38	Latvia	8.625	0	

Rank	Association	Coeff.	Teams	Notes
39	Kosovo	8.166	0	
40	Republic of Ireland	8.125	0	
41	Armenia	8.125	0	
42	Northern Ireland	8.083	0	
43	Albania	8.000	0	
44	Faroe Islands	7.250	0	+1 (UCL)
45	Estonia	7.041	0	
46	Malta	7.000	0	
47	Georgia	7.000	0	
48	North Macedonia	7.000	0	
49	Liechtenstein	6.500	0	
50	Wales	5.500	0	
51	Gibraltar	5.416	0	
52	Iceland	5.375	0	+1 (UCL)
53	Montenegro	4.875	0	
54	Andorra	4.665	0	
55	San Marino	1.332	0	

=== Distribution ===
The following is the access list for this season.

Access list for 2023–24 UEFA Europa League
		Teams entering in this round	Teams advancing from previous round	Teams transferred from Champions League
Third qualifying round (14 teams)	Champions Path (10 teams)	—N/a	—N/a	10 teams eliminated from Champions League second qualifying round (Champions Path)
Third qualifying round (14 teams)	Main Path (4 teams)	2 domestic cup winners from associations 15–16	—N/a	2 teams eliminated from Champions League second qualifying round (League Path)
Play-off round (20 teams)		7 domestic cup winners from associations 7–14 (except Russia)	5 winners from the third qualifying round (Champions Path); 2 winners from the third qualifying round (Main Path)	6 teams eliminated from Champions League third qualifying round (Champions Path)
Group stage (32 teams)		Europa Conference League title holder; 6 domestic cup winners from associations 1–6; 1 domestic league fourth-placed team from association 5; 4 domestic league fifth-placed teams from associations 1–4	10 winners from the play-off round	4 teams eliminated from Champions League play-off round (Champions Path); 2 teams eliminated from Champions League play-off round (League Path); 4 teams eliminated from Champions League third qualifying round (League Path)
Preliminary knockout round (16 teams)		—N/a	8 group runners-up from the group stage	8 group third-placed teams from Champions League group stage
Knockout phase (16 teams)		—N/a	8 group winners from the group stage; 8 winners from the preliminary knockout round	

Due to the suspension of Russia for the 2023–24 European season, the following changes to the access list were made:

- The cup winners of associations 13 (Belgium) and 14 (Switzerland) entered the play-off round instead of the third qualifying round.
- The cup winners of association 16 (Czech Republic) entered the third qualifying round instead of the Europa Conference League second qualifying round.

=== Teams ===
The labels in the parentheses show how each team qualified for the place of its starting round:

- ECL: Europa Conference League title holders
- CW: Cup winners
- 3rd, 4th, 5th, etc.: League position of the previous season
- UCL: Transferred from the Champions League
  - GS: Third-placed teams from the group stage
  - CH/LP PO: Losers from the play-off round (Champions/League Path)
  - CH/LP Q3: Losers from the third qualifying round (Champions/League Path)
  - CH/LP Q2: Losers from the second qualifying round (Champions/League Path)

The third qualifying round was divided into Champions Path (CH) and Main Path (MP).

Qualified teams for 2023–24 UEFA Europa League
Entry round		Teams			
Knockout round play-offs		(Turkey) Galatasaray (UCL GS)	(France) Lens (UCL GS)	(Portugal) Braga (UCL GS)	(Portugal) Benfica (UCL GS)
Knockout round play-offs		(Netherlands) Feyenoord (UCL GS)	(Italy) Milan (UCL GS)	(Switzerland) Young Boys (UCL GS)	(Ukraine) Shakhtar Donetsk (UCL GS)
Group stage		(England) West Ham United (ECL)	(England) Liverpool (5th)	(England) Brighton & Hove Albion (6th)	(Spain) Villarreal (5th)
Group stage		(Spain) Real Betis (6th)	(Italy) Atalanta (5th)	(Italy) Roma (6th)	(Germany) SC Freiburg (5th)
Group stage		(Germany) Bayer Leverkusen (6th)	(France) Toulouse (CW)	(France) Rennes (4th)	(Portugal) Sporting CP (4th)
Group stage		(Scotland) Rangers (UCL LP PO)	(Greece) AEK Athens (UCL CH PO)	(Greece) Panathinaikos (UCL LP PO)	(Norway) Molde (UCL CH PO)
Group stage		(Israel) Maccabi Haifa (UCL CH PO)	(Poland) Raków Częstochowa (UCL CH PO)	(France) Marseille (UCL LP Q3)	(Austria) Sturm Graz (UCL LP Q3)
Group stage		(Serbia) TSC (UCL LP Q3)	(Switzerland) Servette (UCL LP Q3)		
Play-off round		(Netherlands) Ajax (3rd)	(Austria) LASK (3rd)	(Scotland) Aberdeen (3rd)	(Serbia) Čukarički (3rd)
Play-off round		(Ukraine) Zorya Luhansk (3rd)	(Belgium) Union Saint-Gilloise (3rd)	(Switzerland) Lugano (3rd)	(Czech Republic) Sparta Prague (UCL CH Q3)
Play-off round		(Croatia) Dinamo Zagreb (UCL CH Q3)	(Cyprus) Aris Limassol (UCL CH Q3)	(Slovakia) Slovan Bratislava (UCL CH Q3)	(Slovenia) Olimpija Ljubljana (UCL CH Q3)
Play-off round		(Faroe Islands) KÍ (UCL CH Q3)			
Third qualifying round	CH	(Sweden) BK Häcken (UCL CH Q2)	(Bulgaria) Ludogorets Razgrad (UCL CH Q2)	(Azerbaijan) Qarabağ (UCL CH Q2)	(Kazakhstan) Astana (UCL CH Q2)
Third qualifying round	CH	(Belarus) BATE Borisov (UCL CH Q2)	(Moldova) Sheriff Tiraspol (UCL CH Q2)	(Lithuania) Žalgiris (UCL CH Q2)	(Bosnia and Herzegovina) Zrinjski Mostar (UCL CH Q2)
Third qualifying round	CH	(Finland) HJK (UCL CH Q2)	(Iceland) Breiðablik (UCL CH Q2)		
Third qualifying round	MP	(Greece) Olympiacos (3rd)	(Czech Republic) Slavia Prague (CW)	(Ukraine) Dnipro-1 (UCL LP Q2)	(Belgium) Genk (UCL LP Q2)

Notes

1. Russia (RUS): On 28 February 2022, Russian football clubs and national teams were suspended from FIFA and UEFA competitions due to the Russian invasion of Ukraine. The tables reflect Russia's ongoing suspension from UEFA competitions.
2. Ukraine (UKR): Organization of the 2022–23 Ukrainian Cup was aborted and scratched due to the ongoing Russian invasion of Ukraine. The berth reserved for the cup winners was transferred to the third-placed team in the league, Zorya Luhansk.

== Schedule ==
The schedule of the competition was as follows. Matches were scheduled for Thursdays apart from the final, which took place on a Wednesday, though exceptionally could take place on Tuesdays or Wednesdays due to scheduling conflicts.

Schedule for 2023–24 UEFA Europa League
Phase	Round	Draw date	First leg	Second leg
Qualifying	Third qualifying round	24 July 2023	10 August 2023	17 August 2023
Play-offs	Play-off round	7 August 2023	24 August 2023	31 August 2023
Group stage	Matchday 1	1 September 2023	21 September 2023	
Group stage	Matchday 2	1 September 2023	5 October 2023	
Group stage	Matchday 3	1 September 2023	26 October 2023	
Group stage	Matchday 4	1 September 2023	9 November 2023	
Group stage	Matchday 5	1 September 2023	30 November 2023	
Group stage	Matchday 6	1 September 2023	14 December 2023	
Knockout phase	Knockout round play-offs	18 December 2023	15 February 2024	22 February 2024
Knockout phase	Round of 16	23 February 2024	7 March 2024	14 March 2024
Knockout phase	Quarter-finals	15 March 2024	11 April 2024	18 April 2024
Knockout phase	Semi-finals	15 March 2024	2 May 2024	9 May 2024
Knockout phase	Final	15 March 2024	22 May 2024 at Aviva Stadium, Dublin	

== Third qualifying round ==
The draw for the third qualifying round was held on 24 July 2023. The first legs were played on 8 and 10 August, and the second legs were played on 17 August 2023.

The winners of the ties advanced to the play-off round. The losers were transferred to the Europa Conference League play-off round of their respective path.

Team 1	Agg.	Team 2	1st leg	2nd leg
Champions Path
Žalgiris (Lithuania)	1–8	(Sweden) BK Häcken	1–3	0–5
Qarabağ (Azerbaijan)	4–2	(Finland) HJK	2–1	2–1
Zrinjski Mostar (Bosnia and Herzegovina)	6–3	(Iceland) Breiðablik	6–2	0–1
Sheriff Tiraspol (Moldova)	7–3	(Belarus) BATE Borisov	5–1	2–2
Astana (Kazakhstan)	3–6	(Bulgaria) Ludogorets Razgrad	2–1	1–5
Main Path
Olympiacos (Greece)	2–1	(Belgium) Genk	1–0	1–1
Slavia Prague (Czech Republic)	4–1	(Ukraine) Dnipro-1	3–0	1–1

== Play-off round ==
The draw for the play-off round was held on 7 August 2023. The first legs were played on 24 August and the second legs were played on 31 August 2023.

The winners of the ties advanced to the group stage. The losers were transferred to the Europa Conference League group stage.

Team 1	Agg.	Team 2	1st leg	2nd leg
Slavia Prague (Czech Republic)	3–2	(Ukraine) Zorya Luhansk	2–0	1–2
Olympiacos (Greece)	6–1	(Serbia) Čukarički	3–1	3–0
Union Saint-Gilloise (Belgium)	3–0	(Switzerland) Lugano	2–0	1–0
Ludogorets Razgrad (Bulgaria)	2–4	(Netherlands) Ajax	1–4	1–0
BK Häcken (Sweden)	5–3	(Scotland) Aberdeen	2–2	3–1
LASK (Austria)	3–2	(Bosnia and Herzegovina) Zrinjski Mostar	2–1	1–1
KÍ (Faroe Islands)	2–3	(Moldova) Sheriff Tiraspol	1–1	1–2
Olimpija Ljubljana (Slovenia)	1–3	(Azerbaijan) Qarabağ	0–2	1–1
Slovan Bratislava (Slovakia)	4–7	(Cyprus) Aris Limassol	2–1	2–6
Dinamo Zagreb (Croatia)	4–5	(Czech Republic) Sparta Prague	3–1	1–4

== Group stage ==
Location of teams of the 2023–24 UEFA Europa League group stage
Brown: Group A; Red: Group B; Orange: Group C; Yellow: Group D;
Green: Group E; Blue: Group F; Purple: Group G; Pink: Group H

The draw for the group stage was held on 1 September 2023, 13:00 CEST, in Monaco. The 32 teams were drawn into eight groups of four. For the draw, the teams were seeded into four pots each of eight teams, based on their club coefficients. As the winners of the 2022–23 UEFA Europa Conference League, West Ham United entered Pot 1 regardless of their club coefficient (CC). Teams from the same association could not be drawn into the same group.

Brighton & Hove Albion made their debut appearance in European football. Aris Limassol, BK Häcken, Raków Częstochowa, Servette and TSC made their debut appearances in the group stage and their debut appearances in a UEFA competition group stage.

A total of 21 national associations were represented in the group stage.

=== Group A ===
Pos	Team	Pld	W	D	L	GF	GA	GD	Pts	Qualification	WHU	FRE	OLY	TSC
1	(England) West Ham United	6	5	0	1	10	4	+6	15	Advance to round of 16	—	2–0	1–0	3–1
2	(Germany) SC Freiburg	6	4	0	2	17	7	+10	12	Advance to knockout round play-offs	1–2	—	5–0	5–0
3	(Greece) Olympiacos	6	2	1	3	11	14	−3	7	Transfer to Europa Conference League	2–1	2–3	—	5–2
4	(Serbia) TSC	6	0	1	5	6	19	−13	1		0–1	1–3	2–2	—

Source: UEFA

=== Group B ===
Pos	Team	Pld	W	D	L	GF	GA	GD	Pts	Qualification	BHA	MAR	AJA	AEK
1	(England) Brighton & Hove Albion	6	4	1	1	10	5	+5	13	Advance to round of 16	—	1–0	2–0	2–3
2	(France) Marseille	6	3	2	1	14	10	+4	11	Advance to knockout round play-offs	2–2	—	4–3	3–1
3	(Netherlands) Ajax	6	1	2	3	10	13	−3	5	Transfer to Europa Conference League	0–2	3–3	—	3–1
4	(Greece) AEK Athens	6	1	1	4	6	12	−6	4		0–1	0–2	1–1	—

Source: UEFA

=== Group C ===
Pos	Team	Pld	W	D	L	GF	GA	GD	Pts	Qualification	RAN	SPP	BET	ALI
1	(Scotland) Rangers	6	3	2	1	8	6	+2	11	Advance to round of 16	—	2–1	1–0	1–1
2	(Czech Republic) Sparta Prague	6	3	1	2	9	7	+2	10	Advance to knockout round play-offs	0–0	—	1–0	3–2
3	(Spain) Real Betis	6	3	0	3	9	7	+2	9	Transfer to Europa Conference League	2–3	2–1	—	4–1
4	(Cyprus) Aris Limassol	6	1	1	4	7	13	−6	4		2–1	1–3	0–1	—

Source: UEFA

=== Group D ===
Pos	Team	Pld	W	D	L	GF	GA	GD	Pts	Qualification	ATA	SCP	STU	RAK
1	(Italy) Atalanta	6	4	2	0	12	4	+8	14	Advance to round of 16	—	1–1	1–0	2–0
2	(Portugal) Sporting CP	6	3	2	1	10	6	+4	11	Advance to knockout round play-offs	1–2	—	3–0	2–1
3	(Austria) Sturm Graz	6	1	1	4	4	9	−5	4 (Note: Tied on head-to-head results. Overall goal difference used as a tiebreaker.)	Transfer to Europa Conference League	2–2	1–2	—	0–1
4	(Poland) Raków Częstochowa	6	1	1	4	3	10	−7	4		0–4	1–1	0–1	—

Source: UEFA

=== Group E ===
Pos	Team	Pld	W	D	L	GF	GA	GD	Pts	Qualification	LIV	TOU	USG	LAS
1	(England) Liverpool	6	4	0	2	17	7	+10	12	Advance to round of 16	—	5–1	2–0	4–0
2	(France) Toulouse	6	3	2	1	8	9	−1	11	Advance to knockout round play-offs	3–2	—	0–0	1–0
3	(Belgium) Union Saint-Gilloise	6	2	2	2	5	8	−3	8	Transfer to Europa Conference League	2–1	1–1	—	2–1
4	(Austria) LASK	6	1	0	5	6	12	−6	3		1–3	1–2	3–0	—

Source: UEFA

=== Group F ===
Pos	Team	Pld	W	D	L	GF	GA	GD	Pts	Qualification	VIL	REN	MHA	PAO
1	(Spain) Villarreal	6	4	1	1	9	7	+2	13	Advance to round of 16	—	1–0	0–0	3–2
2	(France) Rennes	6	4	0	2	13	6	+7	12	Advance to knockout round play-offs	2–3	—	3–0	3–1
3	(Israel) Maccabi Haifa	6	1	2	3	3	9	−6	5	Transfer to Europa Conference League	1–2	0–3	—	0–0
4	(Greece) Panathinaikos	6	1	1	4	7	10	−3	4		2–0	1–2	1–2	—

Source: UEFA

=== Group G ===
Pos	Team	Pld	W	D	L	GF	GA	GD	Pts	Qualification	SLP	ROM	SRV	SHE
1	(Czech Republic) Slavia Prague	6	5	0	1	17	4	+13	15	Advance to round of 16	—	2–0	4–0	6–0
2	(Italy) Roma	6	4	1	1	12	4	+8	13	Advance to knockout round play-offs	2–0	—	4–0	3–0
3	(Switzerland) Servette	6	1	2	3	4	13	−9	5	Transfer to Europa Conference League	0–2	1–1	—	2–1
4	(Moldova) Sheriff Tiraspol	6	0	1	5	5	17	−12	1		2–3	1–2	1–1	—

Source: UEFA

=== Group H ===
Pos	Team	Pld	W	D	L	GF	GA	GD	Pts	Qualification	LEV	QAR	MOL	HAC
1	(Germany) Bayer Leverkusen	6	6	0	0	19	3	+16	18	Advance to round of 16	—	5–1	5–1	4–0
2	(Azerbaijan) Qarabağ	6	3	1	2	7	9	−2	10	Advance to knockout round play-offs	0–1	—	1–0	2–1
3	(Norway) Molde	6	2	1	3	12	12	0	7	Transfer to Europa Conference League	1–2	2–2	—	5–1
4	(Sweden) BK Häcken	6	0	0	6	3	17	−14	0		0–2	0–1	1–3	—

Source: UEFA

== Knockout phase ==
In the knockout phase, teams played against each other over two legs on a home-and-away basis, except for the one-match final. The mechanism of the draws for each round was as follows:

- In the draw for the knockout round play-offs, the eight group runners-up were seeded, and the eight Champions League group third-placed teams were unseeded. The seeded teams were drawn against the unseeded teams, with the seeded teams hosting the second leg. Teams from the same association could not be drawn against each other.
- In the draw for the round of 16, the eight group winners were seeded, and the eight winners of the knockout round play-offs were unseeded. Again, the seeded teams were drawn against the unseeded teams, with the seeded teams hosting the second leg. Teams from the same association could not be drawn against each other.
- In the draws for the quarter-finals onwards, there were no seedings, and teams from the same association could be drawn against each other. As the draws for the quarter-finals and semi-finals were held together before the quarter-finals were played, the identity of the quarter-final winners was not known at the time of the semi-final draw. A draw was also held to determine which semi-final winner would be designated as the "home" team for the final (for administrative purposes as it was played at a neutral venue).

=== Bracket ===
Knockout round play-offs
(Portugal) Benfica	2	0	2
(France) Toulouse	1	0	1
(Ukraine) Shakhtar Donetsk	2	1	3
(France) Marseille	2	3	5
(Turkey) Galatasaray	3	1	4
(Czech Republic) Sparta Prague	2	4	6
(Switzerland) Young Boys	1	1	2
(Portugal) Sporting CP	3	1	4
(Italy) Milan	3	2	5
(France) Rennes	0	3	3
(Netherlands) Feyenoord	1	1	2 (2)
(Italy) Roma (p)	1	1	2 (4)
(Portugal) Braga	2	3	5
(Azerbaijan) Qarabağ (a.e.t.)	4	2	6
(France) Lens	0	2	2
(Germany) SC Freiburg (a.e.t.)	0	3	3

Round of 16
(Portugal) Benfica	2	1	3
(Scotland) Rangers	2	0	2
(France) Marseille	4	1	5
(Spain) Villarreal	0	3	3
(Czech Republic) Sparta Prague	1	1	2
(England) Liverpool	5	6	11
(Portugal) Sporting CP	1	1	2
(Italy) Atalanta	1	2	3
(Italy) Milan	4	3	7
(Czech Republic) Slavia Prague	2	1	3
(Italy) Roma	4	0	4
(England) Brighton & Hove Albion	0	1	1
(Azerbaijan) Qarabağ	2	2	4
(Germany) Bayer Leverkusen	2	3	5
(Germany) SC Freiburg	1	0	1
(England) West Ham United	0	5	5

Quarter-finals
(Portugal) Benfica	2	0	2 (2)
(France) Marseille (p)	1	1	2 (4)
(England) Liverpool	0	1	1
(Italy) Atalanta	3	0	3
(Italy) Milan	0	1	1
(Italy) Roma	1	2	3
(Germany) Bayer Leverkusen	2	1	3
(England) West Ham United	0	1	1

Semi-finals
(France) Marseille	1	0	1
(Italy) Atalanta	1	3	4
(Italy) Roma	0	2	2
(Germany) Bayer Leverkusen	2	2	4

Final
22 May – Dublin
(Italy) Atalanta	3
(Germany) Bayer Leverkusen	0

=== Knockout round play-offs ===
The draw for the knockout round play-offs was held on 18 December 2023, 13:00 CET. The first legs were played on 15 February, and the second legs were played on 22 February 2024.

Team 1	Agg.	Team 2	1st leg	2nd leg
Feyenoord (Netherlands)	2–2 (2–4 p)	(Italy) Roma	1–1	1–1 (a.e.t.)
Milan (Italy)	5–3	(France) Rennes	3–0	2–3
Lens (France)	2–3	(Germany) SC Freiburg	0–0	2–3 (a.e.t.)
Young Boys (Switzerland)	2–4	(Portugal) Sporting CP	1–3	1–1
Benfica (Portugal)	2–1	(France) Toulouse	2–1	0–0
Braga (Portugal)	5–6	(Azerbaijan) Qarabağ	2–4	3–2 (a.e.t.)
Galatasaray (Turkey)	4–6	(Czech Republic) Sparta Prague	3–2	1–4
Shakhtar Donetsk (Ukraine)	3–5	(France) Marseille	2–2	1–3

=== Round of 16 ===
The draw for the round of 16 was held on 23 February 2024, 12:00 CET. The first legs were played on 6 and 7 March, and the second legs were played on 14 March 2024.

Team 1	Agg.	Team 2	1st leg	2nd leg
Sparta Prague (Czech Republic)	2–11	(England) Liverpool	1–5	1–6
Marseille (France)	5–3	(Spain) Villarreal	4–0	1–3
Roma (Italy)	4–1	(England) Brighton & Hove Albion	4–0	0–1
Benfica (Portugal)	3–2	(Scotland) Rangers	2–2	1–0
SC Freiburg (Germany)	1–5	(England) West Ham United	1–0	0–5
Sporting CP (Portugal)	2–3	(Italy) Atalanta	1–1	1–2
Milan (Italy)	7–3	(Czech Republic) Slavia Prague	4–2	3–1
Qarabağ (Azerbaijan)	4–5	(Germany) Bayer Leverkusen	2–2	2–3

=== Quarter-finals ===
The draw for the quarter-finals was held on 15 March 2024, 13:00 CET. The first legs were played on 11 April, and the second legs were played on 18 April 2024.

Team 1	Agg.	Team 2	1st leg	2nd leg
Milan (Italy)	1–3	(Italy) Roma	0–1	1–2
Liverpool (England)	1–3	(Italy) Atalanta	0–3	1–0
Bayer Leverkusen (Germany)	3–1	(England) West Ham United	2–0	1–1
Benfica (Portugal)	2–2 (2–4 p)	(France) Marseille	2–1	0–1 (a.e.t.)

=== Semi-finals ===
The draw for the semi-finals was held on 15 March 2024, 13:00 CET, after the quarter-final draw. The first legs were played on 2 May, and the second legs were played on 9 May 2024.

Team 1	Agg.	Team 2	1st leg	2nd leg
Marseille (France)	1–4	(Italy) Atalanta	1–1	0–3
Roma (Italy)	2–4	(Germany) Bayer Leverkusen	0–2	2–2

=== Final ===
The final was played on 22 May 2024 at the Aviva Stadium in Dublin. A draw was held on 15 March 2024, after the quarter-final and semi-final draw, to determine the "home" team for administrative purposes.

22 May 2024
20:00 UTC+1

Atalanta (Italy)	3–0	(Germany) Bayer Leverkusen
Lookman 12', 26', 75'	Report

Aviva Stadium, Dublin
Attendance: 47,135
Referee: István Kovács (Romania)

== Statistics ==
Statistics exclude qualifying rounds and play-off round.

=== Top goalscorers ===
Rank	Player	Team	Goals	Minutes played
1	(Gabon) Pierre-Emerick Aubameyang	(France) Marseille	10	1030
2	(Belgium) Romelu Lukaku	(Italy) Roma	7	1082
3	(Italy) Gianluca Scamacca	(Italy) Atalanta	6	697
3	(Brazil) João Pedro	(England) Brighton & Hove Albion	6	436
5	(Brazil) Juninho	(Azerbaijan) Qarabağ	5	794
5	(Ghana) Mohammed Kudus	(England) West Ham United	5	771
5	(Nigeria) Ademola Lookman	(Italy) Atalanta	5	720
5	(Sweden) Viktor Gyökeres	(Portugal) Sporting CP	5	622
5	(Uruguay) Darwin Núñez	(England) Liverpool	5	459
5	(Greece) Fotis Ioannidis	(Greece) Panathinaikos	5	435
5	(Egypt) Mohamed Salah	(England) Liverpool	5	399
5	(Nigeria) Victor Boniface	(Germany) Bayer Leverkusen	5	379
5	(Austria) Michael Gregoritsch	(Germany) SC Freiburg	5	345
5	(Czech Republic) Patrik Schick	(Germany) Bayer Leverkusen	5	301

=== Team of the Season ===
The UEFA technical study group selected the following players as the team of the tournament.

Pos.	Player	Team
GK	(Serbia) Mile Svilar	(Italy) Roma
DF	(Italy) Gianluca Mancini	(Italy) Roma
DF	(Germany) Jonathan Tah	(Germany) Bayer Leverkusen
DF	(Albania) Berat Djimsiti	(Italy) Atalanta
MF	(Netherlands) Jeremie Frimpong	(Germany) Bayer Leverkusen
MF	(Netherlands) Teun Koopmeiners	(Italy) Atalanta
MF	(Switzerland) Granit Xhaka	(Germany) Bayer Leverkusen
MF	(Italy) Matteo Ruggeri	(Italy) Atalanta
FW	(Germany) Florian Wirtz	(Germany) Bayer Leverkusen
FW	(Gabon) Pierre-Emerick Aubameyang	(France) Marseille
FW	(Nigeria) Ademola Lookman	(Italy) Atalanta

=== Player of the Season ===
- (Gabon) Pierre-Emerick Aubameyang ( (France) Marseille)

=== Young Player of the Season ===
- (Germany) Florian Wirtz ( (Germany) Bayer Leverkusen)

== See also ==
- 2023–24 UEFA Champions League
- 2023–24 UEFA Europa Conference League
- 2024 UEFA Super Cup
- 2023–24 UEFA Women's Champions League
- 2023–24 UEFA Youth League
