= 2026–27 Bayer 04 Leverkusen season =

Bayer Leverkusen
2026–27 season
- Administration: Fernando Carro (CEO); Simon Rolfes (Managing Director Sports)
- Head coach: Carles Martínez Novell
- Stadium: BayArena
- Bundesliga: 5th
- DFB-Pokal: Round of 16
- UEFA Europa League: League phase
- Top goalscorer: League: Patrik Schick (8); All: Patrik Schick (12)
Home colours	Away colours	Third colours

The 2026–27 season is the 123rd season in the history of Bayer 04 Leverkusen, and the club's 48th consecutive season in the top flight of German football. In addition to the domestic league, the club is participating in this season's editions of the DFB-Pokal and the UEFA Europa League.

== Season summary ==
On 1 July 2026, Carles Martínez Novell was appointed manager of Bayer Leverkusen.

== Players ==
=== First team squad ===
As of 2 September 2026

Note: Flags indicate national team as defined under FIFA eligibility rules; some limited exceptions apply. Players may hold more than one non-FIFA nationality.

No.	Pos.	Nation	Player
1	GK	NED	Mark Flekken
2	DF	ARG	Facundo Medina
3	DF	ESP	Miguel Gutiérrez
4	DF	ENG	Jarell Quansah
5	DF	FRA	Loïc Badé
6	MF	ARG	Equi Fernández
7	MF	GER	Jonas Hofmann
8	MF	GER	Robert Andrich
9	FW	POR	Afonso Moreira
10	MF	USA	Malik Tillman
11	FW	FRA	Martin Terrier
12	DF	BFA	Edmond Tapsoba (captain)
14	FW	CZE	Patrik Schick
15	DF	GER	Tim Oermann

No.	Pos.	Nation	Player
17	DF	ESP	Lucas Vázquez
18	MF	GER	Kennet Eichhorn
19	FW	FRA	Moussa Diaby
20	DF	CIV	Guéla Doué
22	FW	NGR	Victor Boniface
23	FW	NGR	Nathan Tella
24	MF	ESP	Aleix García
28	GK	GER	Janis Blaswich
29	FW	MAR	Eliesse Ben Seghir
30	MF	ALG	Ibrahim Maza
35	FW	CMR	Christian Kofane
36	GK	GER	Niklas Lomb
42	MF	GER	Montrell Culbreath

=== Players out on loan ===
Note: Flags indicate national team as defined under FIFA eligibility rules; some limited exceptions apply. Players may hold more than one non-FIFA nationality.

No.	Pos.	Nation	Player
—	DF	BRA	Arthur (at Werder Bremen until 30 June 2027)
—	DF	FRA	Jeanuël Belocian (at Racing Santander until 30 June 2027)
—	DF	GER	Luca Erlein (at Energie Cottbus until 30 June 2027)
—	DF	FRA	Axel Tape (at Levante until 30 June 2027)
—	DF	MLI	Issa Traoré (at Trenčín until 30 June 2027)
—	DF	SEN	Abdoulaye Faye (at Celta Vigo Until 30 June 2027)

No.	Pos.	Nation	Player
—	MF	BEL	Noah Mbamba (at Lorient until 30 June 2027)
—	MF	GER	Francis Onyeka (at SV Elversberg until 30 June 2027)
—	FW	GER	Farid Alfa-Ruprecht (at Hertha BSC until 30 June 2027)
—	FW	NED	Ernest Poku (at Beşiktaş until 30 June 2027)
—	FW	UKR	Artem Stepanov (at Utrecht until 30 June 2027)

== Transfers ==
=== In ===
Pos.	Player	Transferred from	Fee	Date	Source
MF	(Germany) Kennet Eichhorn	(Germany) Hertha BSC	€9,000,000	1 July 2026	
FW	(Bosnia and Herzegovina) Kerim Alajbegović	(Austria) Red Bull Salzburg	€8,000,000	1 July 2026	
FW	(Mali) Ndjicoura Bomba	(Mali) CS Bamako	€1,500,000	1 July 2026	
FW	(Portugal) Afonso Moreira	(France) Lyon	€29,500,000	1 July 2026	
DF	(Germany) Luca Erlein	(Germany) TSG Hoffenheim	€2,000,000	25 July 2026	
DF	(Spain) Miguel Gutiérrez	(Italy) Napoli	€26,000,000	2 August 2026	
DF	(Argentina) Facundo Medina	(France) Lens	€23,000,000	11 August 2026	
DF	(Ivory Coast) Guéla Doué	(France) Strasbourg	€30,000,000	1 September 2026	
FW	(France) Moussa Diaby	(Saudi Arabia) Al-Ittihad	€28,000,000	1 September 2026	

Total expenditure: ▼€157 million (excluding potential add-ons, bonuses and undisclosed figures)

=== Out ===
Pos.	Player	Transferred to	Fee	Date	Source
GK	(Czech Republic) Matěj Kovář	(Netherlands) PSV Eindhoven	€5,000,000 (Note: Loan made permanent)	1 July 2026	
DF	(Spain) Álex Grimaldo	(Spain) Atlético Madrid	€15,000,000	1 July 2026	
DF	(Ecuador) Piero Hincapié	(England) Arsenal	€40,000,000	1 July 2026	
MF	(Germany) Francis Onyeka	(Germany) SV Elversberg	Loan (€750,000)	1 July 2026	
DF	(Mali) Issa Traoré	(Slovakia) Trenčín	Loan	6 July 2026	
FW	(Germany) Ken Izekor	(Germany) Alemannia Aachen	Undisclosed	9 July 2026	
FW	(Argentina) Alejo Sarco	(Spain) Sporting Gijón	€500,000	21 July 2026	
DF	(Germany) Luca Erlein	(Germany) Energie Cottbus	Loan	27 July 2026	
FW	(Bosnia and Herzegovina) Kerim Alajbegović	(Italy) Juventus	€32,000,000	2 August 2026	
DF	(Senegal) Abdoulaye Faye	(Spain) Celta Vigo	Loan (€300,000)	3 August 2026	
MF	(Belgium) Noah Mbamba	(France) Lorient	Loan (€500,000)	8 August 2026	
MF	(Germany) Jeremiah Mensah	(Netherlands) Roda JC	Loan	12 August 2026	
FW	(Germany) Farid Alfa-Ruprecht	(Germany) Hertha BSC	Loan	20 August 2026	
MF	(Argentina) Exequiel Palacios	(England) Ipswich Town	€22,500,000	27 August 2026	
FW	(Netherlands) Ernest Poku	(Turkey) Beşiktaş	Loan (€3,000,000)	27 August 2026	
DF	(France) Axel Tape	(Spain) Levante	Loan	31 August 2026	
DF	(Brazil) Arthur	(Germany) Werder Bremen	Loan	1 September 2026	
DF	(France) Jeanuël Belocian	(Spain) Racing Santander	Loan	1 September 2026	

Total income: ▲€119.55 million (excluding potential add-ons, bonuses and undisclosed figures)

== Competitions ==
=== Overall record ===
Competition	First match	Last match	Starting round	Final position	Record							
Competition	First match	Last match	Starting round	Final position	Pld	W	D	L	GF	GA	GD	Win %
Bundesliga	29 August 2026	22 May 2027	Matchday 1	TBD	10	6	1	3	24	17	+7	60.00
DFB-Pokal	22 August 2026	TBD	First round	TBD	2	2	0	0	9	2	+7	100.00
UEFA Europa League	16 September 2026	TBD	League phase	TBD	4	3	0	1	8	1	+7	75.00
Total					16	11	1	4	41	20	+21	68.75

Last updated: 21 November 2026
Source: Soccerway

=== Bundesliga ===
==== League table ====
Pos	Team	Pld	W	D	L	GF	GA	GD	Pts	Qualification or relegation
3	SC Freiburg	10	7	1	2	21	10	+11	22	Qualification for the Champions League league phase
4	RB Leipzig	10	7	0	3	32	14	+18	21	Qualification for the Champions League league phase
5	Bayer Leverkusen	10	6	1	3	24	17	+7	19	Qualification for the Europa League league phase (Note: The 2026–27 DFB-Pokal winners also qualify for the Europa League league stage (or the sixth-placed team if the DFB-Pokal winners finish in the top five of the Bundesliga). If the DFB-Pokal winners finish in the top six of the Bundesliga, the Conference League spot will be passed to the seventh-placed team.)
6	Werder Bremen	9	4	3	2	17	15	+2	15	Qualification for the Conference League play-off round
7	Eintracht Frankfurt	10	4	3	3	16	20	−4	15	

Updated to match(es) played on 21 November 2026. Source: Bundesliga
Rules for classification: 1) Points; 2) Goal difference; 3) Goals scored; 4) Head-to-head aggregate results; 5) Head-to-head away goals scored; 6) Away goals scored; 7) Play-off at neutral site.
(Rules 4–6 only apply after all home-and-away matches have been played between the tied teams. Rule 7 only applies after the completion of the season.)

==== Results summary ====
Overall								Home						Away					
Pld	W	D	L	GF	GA	GD	Pts	W	D	L	GF	GA	GD	W	D	L	GF	GA	GD
10	6	1	3	24	17	+7	19	4	0	1	14	5	+9	2	1	2	10	12	−2

Last updated: 21 November 2026.
Source: Kicker

==== Results by round ====
Round	1	2	3	4	5	6	7	8	9	10	11	12	13	14	15	16	17	18	19	20	21	22	23	24	25	26	27	28	29	30	31	32	33	34
Ground	A	H	A	H	A	H	A	H	A	H	A	H	A	H	A	A	H	H	A	H	A	H	A	H	A	H	A	H	A	H	A	H	H	A
Result	L	W	D	W	W	W	L	L	W	W																								
Position	12	7	7	5	4	4	4	6	5	5																								
Points	0	3	4	7	10	13	13	13	16	19																								

Updated to match(es) played on 8 November 2026. Source: Bundesliga
A = Away; H = Home; W = Win; D = Draw; L = Loss

==== Matches ====
The league fixtures were released in June 2026.

Win Draw Loss Fixtures

29 August 2026 1	SV Elversberg	3–2	Bayer Leverkusen	Spiesen-Elversberg
15:30 CEST (UTC+2)	Petkov 8'; Campbell 9', (yellow card) 41'; Rohr (yellow card) 29'; Mokwa 46'; Kristof (yellow card) 89'	Report	Maza (yellow card) 53'; Schick 77'; Medina (yellow card) 78'; Kofane 90+1'	Stadium: Ursapharm-Arena; Attendance: 9,307; Referee: Robert Hartmann

5 September 2026 2	Bayer Leverkusen	4–0	Union Berlin	Leverkusen
15:30 CEST (UTC+2)	Fernández 1'; Medina 28'; Schick 48'; Gutiérrez (yellow card) 61'; Maza 66', (yellow card) 88'	Report	Uduokhai (yellow card) 4'; Van Den Bosch (yellow card) 47'	Stadium: BayArena; Attendance: 29,629; Referee: Robin Braun

12 September 2026 3	FC Augsburg	2–2	Bayer Leverkusen	Augsburg
15:30 CEST (UTC+2)	Banks (yellow card) 38'; Gregoritsch 50', 55'	Report	Kofane 18'; Doué (yellow card) 72'; Schick 89'	Stadium: WWK Arena; Attendance: 29,775; Referee: Daniel Siebert

20 September 2026 4	Bayer Leverkusen	2–0	RB Leipzig	Leverkusen
15:30 CEST (UTC+2)	Schick 44'; Gutiérrez 57'; Tapsoba (yellow card) 81'; Moreira (yellow card) 90+1'	Report	Nusa (yellow card) 11'; El Aynaoui (yellow card) 74'; Henrichs (yellow card) 90+1'	Stadium: BayArena; Attendance: 29,573; Referee: Robert Schröder

10 October 2026 5	Mainz 05	3–4	Bayer Leverkusen	Mainz
15:30 CEST (UTC+2)	Tietz (yellow card) 20'; Caci 33', 42'; Becker (yellow card) 35'; Lee (yellow card) 76'; Hollerbach 90+2'	Report	Andrich 5'; Schick 9'; Quansah 55', (yellow card) 90+3'; Diaby 65'	Stadium: Mewa Arena; Attendance: 33,000; Referee: Max Burda

18 October 2026 6	Bayer Leverkusen	2–1	SC Freiburg	Leverkusen
15:30 CEST (UTC+2)	Maza 19'; Schick 76'	Report	Scherhant 14'; Treu (yellow card) 39'	Stadium: BayArena; Attendance: 30,210; Referee: Florian Badstübner

25 October 2026 7	TSG Hoffenheim	3–0	Bayer Leverkusen	Sinsheim
15:30 CET (UTC+1)	Prass (yellow card) 45' (yellow-red card) 90+1', (goal) 89'; Avdullahu (yellow card) 67'; Kramarić 79' (pen.); Daghim (yellow card) 82'; Moerstedt 90+6'	Report	Fernández (yellow card) 40'; Schick (yellow card) 58'; Medina (yellow card) 75'; Badé (yellow card) 90+3'	Stadium: SNP Arena; Attendance: 27,378; Referee: Daniel Siebert

31 October 2026 8	Bayer Leverkusen	2–4	VfB Stuttgart	Leverkusen
15:30 CET (UTC+1)	Fernández (yellow card) 17'; Schick 28'; Medina (yellow card) 40'; García (yellow card) 40'; Maza (yellow card) 53', (goal) 79'	Report	Demirović 14', 65', (yellow card) 64'; Leweling 22'; Chabot (yellow card) 40'; Jaquez (yellow card) 40'; El Khannouss 51'; Karazor (yellow card) 58'	Stadium: BayArena; Attendance: 30,210; Referee: Benjamin Brand

8 November 2026 9	1. FC Köln	1–2	Bayer Leverkusen	Cologne
15:30 CET (UTC+1)	Krauß (yellow card) 40'; Moore (yellow card) 46'; Maina (yellow card) 52'; Schmied (yellow card) 57'; Sosa (yellow card) 70'; El Mala 90+2'; Simpson-Pusey (yellow card) 90+5'	Report	García 7', (yellow card) 90+5'; Medina (yellow card) 34'; Moreira (yellow card) 52'; Tapsoba (yellow card) 53'; Schick 85'; Hofmann (yellow card) 90+6'	Stadium: RheinEnergieStadion; Attendance: 50,000; Referee: Felix Zwayer

21 November 2026 10	Bayer Leverkusen	4–0	SC Paderborn	Leverkusen
15:30 CET (UTC+1)	Moreira 14', 47'; Schick 51'; Fernández (yellow card) 54', (goal) 59'; Gutiérrez (yellow card) 55'	Report		Stadium: BayArena; Attendance: 29,500; Referee: Tobias Reichel

29 November 2026 11	Borussia Dortmund	v	Bayer Leverkusen	Dortmund
19:30 CET (UTC+1)		Report		Stadium: Signal Iduna Park

4–6 December 2026 12	Bayer Leverkusen	v	Borussia Mönchengladbach	Leverkusen
--:-- CET (UTC+1)		Report		Stadium: BayArena

11–13 December 2026 13	Werder Bremen	v	Bayer Leverkusen	Bremen
--:-- CET (UTC+1)		Report		Stadium: Weserstadion

18–20 December 2026 14	Bayer Leverkusen	v	Eintracht Frankfurt	Leverkusen
--:-- CET (UTC+1)		Report		Stadium: BayArena

8–10 January 2027 15	Hamburger SV	v	Bayer Leverkusen	Hamburg
--:-- CET (UTC+1)		Report		Stadium: Volksparkstadion

12–14 January 2027 16	Bayern Munich	v	Bayer Leverkusen	Munich
--:-- CET (UTC+1)		Report		Stadium: Allianz Arena

15–17 January 2027 17	Bayer Leverkusen	v	Schalke 04	Leverkusen
--:-- CET (UTC+1)		Report		Stadium: BayArena

22–24 January 2027 18	Bayer Leverkusen	v	SV Elversberg	Leverkusen
--:-- CET (UTC+1)		Report		Stadium: BayArena

29–31 January 2027 19	Union Berlin	v	Bayer Leverkusen	Berlin
--:-- CET (UTC+1)		Report		Stadium: Stadion An der Alten Försterei

5–7 February 2027 20	Bayer Leverkusen	v	FC Augsburg	Leverkusen
--:-- CET (UTC+1)		Report		Stadium: BayArena

12–14 February 2027 21	RB Leipzig	v	Bayer Leverkusen	Leipzig
--:-- CET (UTC+1)		Report		Stadium: Red Bull Arena

19–21 February 2027 22	Bayer Leverkusen	v	Mainz 05	Leverkusen
--:-- CET (UTC+1)		Report		Stadium: BayArena

26–28 February 2027 23	SC Freiburg	v	Bayer Leverkusen	Freiburg
--:-- CET (UTC+1)		Report		Stadium: Europa-Park Stadion

2–4 March 2027 24	Bayer Leverkusen	v	TSG Hoffenheim	Leverkusen
--:-- CET (UTC+1)		Report		Stadium: BayArena

5–7 March 2027 25	VfB Stuttgart	v	Bayer Leverkusen	Stuttgart
--:-- CET (UTC+1)		Report		Stadium: MHPArena

12–14 March 2027 26	Bayer Leverkusen	v	1. FC Köln	Leverkusen
--:-- CET (UTC+1)		Report		Stadium: BayArena

19–21 March 2027 27	SC Paderborn	v	Bayer Leverkusen	Paderborn
--:-- CET (UTC+1)		Report		Stadium: Home Deluxe Arena

2–4 April 2027 28	Bayer Leverkusen	v	Borussia Dortmund	Leverkusen
--:-- CEST (UTC+2)		Report		Stadium: BayArena

9–11 April 2027 29	Borussia Mönchengladbach	v	Bayer Leverkusen	Mönchengladbach
--:-- CEST (UTC+2)		Report		Stadium: Borussia-Park

16–18 April 2027 30	Bayer Leverkusen	v	Werder Bremen	Leverkusen
--:-- CEST (UTC+2)		Report		Stadium: BayArena

23–25 April 2027 31	Eintracht Frankfurt	v	Bayer Leverkusen	Frankfurt
--:-- CEST (UTC+2)		Report		Stadium: Deutsche Bank Park

7–9 May 2027 32	Bayer Leverkusen	v	Hamburger SV	Leverkusen
--:-- CEST (UTC+2)		Report		Stadium: BayArena

14–16 May 2027 33	Bayer Leverkusen	v	Bayern Munich	Leverkusen
--:-- CEST (UTC+2)		Report		Stadium: BayArena

22 May 2027 34	Schalke 04	v	Bayer Leverkusen	Gelsenkirchen
15:30 CEST (UTC+2)		Report		Stadium: Veltins-Arena

=== DFB-Pokal ===
22 August 2026 First round	Wehen Wiesbaden	0–4	Bayer Leverkusen	Wiesbaden
13:00 CEST (UTC+2)	Greilinger (yellow card) 22'; Fechner (yellow card) 64'	Report	Schick 43'; Vázquez 47'; Tella 69'; Kofane 79'	Stadium: BRITA-Arena; Attendance: 12,000; Referee: Christian Dingert

28 October 2026 Second round	Bayer Leverkusen	5–2	1. FC Nürnberg	Leverkusen
20:45 CET (UTC+1)	Tapsoba 41', 49'; Schick 70' (pen.); Fernández (yellow card) 73'; Hofmann 78'; Vázquez (yellow card) 86', (goal) 89'	Report	Lubach 13'; Haugen 30'; Masouras (yellow card) 81'	Stadium: BayArena; Attendance: 29,681; Referee: Felix Zwayer

2 December 2026 Round of 16	Bayer Leverkusen	v	RB Leipzig	Leverkusen
18:00 CET (UTC+1)		Report		Stadium: BayArena

=== UEFA Europa League ===
==== League phase ====
The draw for the league phase was held on 28 August 2026.

Pos	Team	Pld	W	D	L	GF	GA	GD	Pts	Qualification
5	(Italy) Juventus	4	3	1	0	11	4	+7	10	Advance to round of 16 (seeded)
6	(Greece) Olympiacos	4	3	1	0	4	1	+3	10	Advance to round of 16 (seeded)
7	(Germany) Bayer Leverkusen	4	3	0	1	8	1	+7	9	Advance to round of 16 (seeded)
8	(Turkey) Beşiktaş	4	2	1	1	11	8	+3	7	Advance to round of 16 (seeded)
9	(Croatia) Dinamo Zagreb	4	2	1	1	5	4	+1	7	Advance to knockout phase play-offs (seeded)

Updated to match(es) played on 5 November 2026. Source: UEFA
Rules for classification: League phase tiebreakers

Round	1	2	3	4	5	6	7	8
Ground	H	A	A	H	A	H	H	A
Result	W	W	W	L				
Position	8	2	2	7				
Points	3	6	9	9				

Updated to match(es) played on 5 November 2026. Source: UEFA
A = Away; H = Home; W = Win; D = Draw; L = Loss

16 September 2026 1	Bayer Leverkusen (Germany)	2–0	(Slovenia) Celje	Leverkusen
21:00 CEST (UTC+2)	Sešlar 15' (o.g.); Medina 74'	Report		Stadium: BayArena; Attendance: 27,945; Referee: Jasper Vergoote (Belgium)

15 October 2026 2	Lech Poznań (Poland)	0–4	(Germany) Bayer Leverkusen	Poznań, Poland
18:45 CEST (UTC+2)	Skrzypczak (yellow card) 40'	Report	Schick 29' (pen.), 41' (pen.); Tillman 32'; Andrich (yellow card) 68'; Diaby (yellow card) 80'; Maza 89'	Stadium: Poznań Stadium; Attendance: 40,116; Referee: Miloš Milanović (Serbia)

22 October 2026 3	OFI (Greece)	0–2	(Germany) Bayer Leverkusen	Heraklion, Greece
19:45 EEST (UTC+3)	González (yellow card) 87'	Report	García (yellow card) 25'; Hofmann 35', 38'; Quansah (yellow card) 79'; Fernández (yellow card) 86'	Stadium: Pankritio Stadium; Attendance: 16,750; Referee: Oleksiy Derevinskyi (Ukraine)

5 November 2026 4	Bayer Leverkusen (Germany)	0–1	(France) Marseille	Leverkusen
21:00 CET (UTC+1)	Gutiérrez (yellow card) 6'	Report	Paixão (yellow card) 39'; Garcia (yellow card) 54'; Gouiri 77'; Nnadi (yellow card) 90'	Stadium: BayArena; Attendance: 28,758; Referee: Orel Grinfeld (Israel)

26 November 2026 5	Dinamo Zagreb (Croatia)	v	(Germany) Bayer Leverkusen	Zagreb, Croatia
18:45 CET (UTC+1)		Report		Stadium: Maksimir Stadium

10 December 2026 6	Bayer Leverkusen (Germany)	v	(Turkey) Beşiktaş	Leverkusen
21:00 CET (UTC+1)		Report		Stadium: BayArena

21 January 2027 7	Bayer Leverkusen (Germany)	v	(Austria) Red Bull Salzburg	Leverkusen
21:00 CET (UTC+1)		Report		Stadium: BayArena

28 January 2027 8	Lyon (France)	v	(Germany) Bayer Leverkusen	Décines-Charpieu, France
21:00 CET (UTC+1)		Report		Stadium: Parc Olympique Lyonnais

== Statistics ==
=== Appearances and goals ===
No.	Pos	Nat	Player	Total		Bundesliga		DFB-Pokal		Europa League	
No.	Pos	Nat	Player	Apps	Goals	Apps	Goals	Apps	Goals	Apps	Goals
Goalkeepers
1	GK	(Netherlands) NED	Mark Flekken	0	0	0	0	0	0	0	0
28	GK	(Germany) GER	Janis Blaswich	0	0	0	0	0	0	0	0
36	GK	(Germany) GER	Niklas Lomb	0	0	0	0	0	0	0	0
Defenders
2	DF	(Argentina) ARG	Facundo Medina	0	0	0	0	0	0	0	0
3	DF	(Spain) ESP	Miguel Gutiérrez	0	0	0	0	0	0	0	0
4	DF	(England) ENG	Jarell Quansah	0	0	0	0	0	0	0	0
5	DF	(France) FRA	Loïc Badé	0	0	0	0	0	0	0	0
12	DF	(Burkina Faso) BFA	Edmond Tapsoba	0	0	0	0	0	0	0	0
15	DF	(Germany) GER	Tim Oermann	0	0	0	0	0	0	0	0
17	DF	(Spain) ESP	Lucas Vázquez	0	0	0	0	0	0	0	0
20	DF	(Ivory Coast) CIV	Guéla Doué	0	0	0	0	0	0	0	0
Midfielders
6	MF	(Argentina) ARG	Equi Fernández	0	0	0	0	0	0	0	0
7	MF	(Germany) GER	Jonas Hofmann	0	0	0	0	0	0	0	0
8	MF	(Germany) GER	Robert Andrich	0	0	0	0	0	0	0	0
10	MF	(United States) USA	Malik Tillman	0	0	0	0	0	0	0	0
18	MF	(Germany) GER	Kennet Eichhorn	0	0	0	0	0	0	0	0
24	MF	(Spain) ESP	Aleix García	0	0	0	0	0	0	0	0
30	MF	(Algeria) ALG	Ibrahim Maza	0	0	0	0	0	0	0	0
42	MF	(Germany) GER	Montrell Culbreath	0	0	0	0	0	0	0	0
Forwards
9	FW	(Portugal) POR	Afonso Moreira	0	0	0	0	0	0	0	0
11	FW	(France) FRA	Martin Terrier	0	0	0	0	0	0	0	0
14	FW	(Czech Republic) CZE	Patrik Schick	0	0	0	0	0	0	0	0
19	FW	(France) FRA	Moussa Diaby	0	0	0	0	0	0	0	0
22	FW	(Nigeria) NGR	Victor Boniface	0	0	0	0	0	0	0	0
23	FW	(Nigeria) NGR	Nathan Tella	0	0	0	0	0	0	0	0
29	FW	(Morocco) MAR	Eliesse Ben Seghir	0	0	0	0	0	0	0	0
35	FW	(Cameroon) CMR	Christian Kofane	0	0	0	0	0	0	0	0
Players transferred/loaned out during the season
25	MF	(Argentina) ARG	Exequiel Palacios	0	0	0	0	0	0	0	0

Source: Competitions
