= 2025–26 Bayer 04 Leverkusen season =

122nd season in existence of Bayer 04 Leverkusen

Bayer Leverkusen
2025–26 season
- Administration: Fernando Carro (CEO); Simon Rolfes (Managing Director Sports)
- Head coach: Erik ten Hag (until 1 September); Kasper Hjulmand (from 8 September)
- Stadium: BayArena
- Bundesliga: 6th
- DFB-Pokal: Semi-finals
- UEFA Champions League: Round of 16
- Top goalscorer: League: Patrik Schick (16); All: Patrik Schick (22)
- Average home league attendance: 30,016
- Biggest win: Bayer Leverkusen 6–0 1. FC Heidenheim; 8 November 2025; Bundesliga
- Biggest defeat: Bayer Leverkusen 2–7 Paris Saint-Germain; 22 October 2025; UEFA Champions League
Home colours	Away colours	Third colours

The 2025–26 season was the 122nd season in the history of Bayer 04 Leverkusen, and the club's 47th consecutive season in the top flight of German football. In addition to the domestic league, the club participated in this season's editions of the DFB-Pokal and the UEFA Champions League.

== Season summary ==
On 20 June 2025, attacking midfielder Florian Wirtz joined Premier League club Liverpool for a reported base fee of depending on the source £100 million (€117.5 million) or £107 million (€125 million), with £16 million (€18.8 million) or €25 million in bonuses. Wirtz became the sixth most expensive footballer of all time surpassing Enzo Fernández £106.8 million transfer to Chelsea in 2023. He also became the largest transfer in the history of the Bundesliga, replacing Ousmane Dembélé as record holder.

This season saw Dutchman Erik ten Hag become the new head coach of Bayer Leverkusen on 1 July, following Xabi Alonso's departure to Real Madrid.

On 1 September, Ten Hag was sacked by Bayer Leverkusen after two Bundesliga games and three total competitive games in charge, setting a new record for the fewest league matches in charge before being dismissed in Germany. On 8 September, former Denmark manager Kasper Hjulmand assumed head coach responsibilities.

== Players ==
=== First-team squad ===
As of 2 February 2026

Note: Flags indicate national team as defined under FIFA eligibility rules; some limited exceptions apply. Players may hold more than one non-FIFA nationality.

No.	Pos.	Nation	Player
1	GK	NED	Mark Flekken
4	DF	ENG	Jarell Quansah
5	DF	FRA	Loïc Badé
6	MF	ARG	Equi Fernández
7	MF	GER	Jonas Hofmann
8	MF	GER	Robert Andrich (captain)
10	MF	USA	Malik Tillman
11	FW	FRA	Martin Terrier
12	DF	BFA	Edmond Tapsoba
13	DF	BRA	Arthur
14	FW	CZE	Patrik Schick
16	DF	FRA	Axel Tape
17	MF	MAR	Eliesse Ben Seghir
18	GK	SUI	Jonas Omlin (on loan from Borussia Mönchengladbach)

No.	Pos.	Nation	Player
19	FW	NED	Ernest Poku
20	DF	ESP	Álex Grimaldo
21	DF	ESP	Lucas Vázquez
23	MF	NGR	Nathan Tella
24	MF	ESP	Aleix García
25	MF	ARG	Exequiel Palacios
27	MF	GER	Jeremiah Mensah
28	GK	GER	Janis Blaswich
30	MF	ALG	Ibrahim Maza
35	FW	CMR	Christian Kofane
36	GK	GER	Niklas Lomb
41	DF	MLI	Issa Traoré
42	FW	GER	Montrell Culbreath

=== Players out on loan ===
Note: Flags indicate national team as defined under FIFA eligibility rules; some limited exceptions apply. Players may hold more than one non-FIFA nationality.

No.	Pos.	Nation	Player
—	DF	FRA	Jeanuël Belocian (at VfL Wolfsburg until 30 June 2026)
—	DF	GER	Tim Oermann (at Sturm Graz until 30 June 2026)
—	DF	SEN	Abdoulaye Faye (at Lorient until 30 June 2026)
—	DF	ECU	Piero Hincapié (at Arsenal until 30 June 2026)
—	DF	ITA	Andrea Natali (at AZ until 30 June 2026)
—	MF	BEL	Noah Mbamba (at Dender until 30 June 2026)

No.	Pos.	Nation	Player
—	MF	GER	Francis Onyeka (at VfL Bochum until 30 June 2026)
—	FW	UKR	Artem Stepanov (at Utrecht until 30 June 2026)
—	FW	NGR	Victor Boniface (at Werder Bremen until 30 June 2026)
—	FW	GER	Farid Alfa-Ruprecht (at VfL Bochum until 30 June 2026)
—	FW	ARG	Alejo Sarco (at Borussia Mönchengladbach until 30 June 2026)

== Transfers ==
=== In ===
Pos.	Player	Transferred from	Fee	Date	Source
FW	(Algeria) Ibrahim Maza	(Germany) Hertha BSC	€12,000,000	1 July 2025	
GK	(Netherlands) Mark Flekken	(England) Brentford	€10,000,000	1 July 2025	
DF	(Senegal) Abdoulaye Faye	(Sweden) BK Häcken	€2,700,000	1 July 2025	
DF	(Germany) Tim Oermann	(Germany) VfL Bochum	€1,800,000	1 July 2025	
DF	(France) Axel Tape	(France) Paris Saint-Germain	Free	1 July 2025	
DF	(England) Jarell Quansah	(England) Liverpool	€35,000,000	2 July 2025	
FW	(Cameroon) Christian Kofane	(Spain) Albacete	€5,000,000	11 July 2025	
MF	(United States) Malik Tillman	(Netherlands) PSV Eindhoven	€35,000,000	12 July 2025	
FW	(Germany) Farid Alfa-Ruprecht	(England) Manchester City	Undisclosed	27 July 2025	
GK	(Germany) Janis Blaswich	(Germany) RB Leipzig	€2,000,000	11 August 2025	
FW	(Netherlands) Ernest Poku	(Netherlands) AZ	€10,000,000	12 August 2025	
MF	(Argentina) Claudio Echeverri	(England) Manchester City	Loan	21 August 2025	
DF	(France) Loïc Badé	(Spain) Sevilla	€25,000,000	21 August 2025	
DF	(Spain) Lucas Vázquez	—N/a (Note: Most recently played for Real Madrid)	Free	26 August 2025	
MF	(Morocco) Eliesse Ben Seghir	(France) Monaco	€30,000,000	31 August 2025	
MF	(Argentina) Equi Fernández	(Saudi Arabia) Al-Qadsiah	Undisclosed	1 September 2025	
DF	(Mali) Issa Traoré	(Mali) Djoliba	Undisclosed	1 January 2026	
GK	(Switzerland) Jonas Omlin	(Germany) Borussia Mönchengladbach	Loan	27 January 2026	

Total expenditure: ▼€168.5 million (excluding potential add-ons, bonuses and undisclosed figures)

=== Out ===
Pos.	Player	Transferred to	Fee	Date	Source
DF	(Germany) Jonathan Tah	(Germany) Bayern Munich	€800,000	1 June 2025	
MF	(Germany) Francis Onyeka	(Germany) VfL Bochum	Loan	1 July 2025	
DF	(Netherlands) Jeremie Frimpong	(England) Liverpool	€35,000,000	1 July 2025	
FW	(Germany) Florian Wirtz	(England) Liverpool	€117,500,000	1 July 2025	
DF	(Ivory Coast) Odilon Kossounou	(Italy) Atalanta	€20,000,000	1 July 2025	
GK	(Germany) Luca Novodomsky	(Germany) TSV Solingen	Free	1 July 2025	
DF	(Germany) Tim Oermann	(Austria) Sturm Graz	Loan	2 July 2025	
FW	(Ukraine) Artem Stepanov	(Germany) 1. FC Nürnberg	Loan	2 July 2025	
GK	(Czech Republic) Matěj Kovář	(Netherlands) PSV Eindhoven	Loan	15 July 2025	
DF	(Senegal) Abdoulaye Faye	(France) Lorient	Loan	29 July 2025	
MF	(Switzerland) Granit Xhaka	(England) Sunderland	€15,000,000	30 July 2025	
GK	(Finland) Lukas Hradecky	(France) Monaco	€2,000,000	8 August 2025	
MF	(Morocco) Amine Adli	(England) Bournemouth	€29,000,000	21 August 2025	
DF	(Ecuador) Piero Hincapié	(England) Arsenal	Loan	1 September 2025	
FW	(Nigeria) Victor Boniface	(Germany) Werder Bremen	Loan	1 September 2025	
MF	(Colombia) Gustavo Puerta	(Spain) Racing Santander	€3,500,000	1 September 2025	
FW	(Germany) Farid Alfa-Ruprecht	(Germany) VfL Bochum	Loan	1 September 2025	
DF	(Italy) Andrea Natali	(Netherlands) AZ	Loan	2 September 2025	
MF	(Argentina) Claudio Echeverri	(England) Manchester City	Loan recall	26 December 2025	
GK	(Czech Republic) Matěj Kovář	(Netherlands) PSV Eindhoven	€5,000,000	13 January 2026	
FW	(Argentina) Alejo Sarco	(Germany) Borussia Mönchengladbach	Loan	20 January 2026	
DF	(France) Jeanuël Belocian	(Germany) VfL Wolfsburg	Loan	2 February 2026	

Total income: ▲€227.8 million (excluding potential add-ons, bonuses and undisclosed figures)

== Pre-season and friendlies ==
The club's pre-season tour to Rio saw them become the first Bundesliga club to stage a pre-season tour in South America, along with also being the first Bundesliga club to open and operate a football academy in Brazil, nicknamed the "Bayer 04 Football Academy São Paulo," led by former Brazilian and Leverkusen forward Paulo Sérgio.

Win Draw Loss Fixtures

18 July 2025 Friendly	Flamengo U20	5–1	Bayer Leverkusen	Rio de Janeiro, Brazil
14:35 BRT (UTC−3)	Lorran 2'; Arthur 10' (o.g.); Gonçalves 39'; Pedro Leão 45'; Gusttavo 54'	Report	Tape (yellow card) 45+1'; Culbreath 71'	Stadium: Estádio da Gávea; Referee: Marcelo Henrique (Brazil)

27 July 2025 Friendly	VfL Bochum	0–2	Bayer Leverkusen	Bochum
17:00 CEST (UTC+2)	Vogt (yellow card) 59'; Sissoko (yellow card) 75'	Report	Hofmann 24'; Schick 45+1'; Kofane (yellow card) 49'	Stadium: Vonovia Ruhrstadion; Attendance: 15,788; Referee: Felix Weller

1 August 2025 Friendly	Fortuna Sittard	1–2	Bayer Leverkusen	Sittard, Netherlands
19:00 CEST (UTC+2)	Brittijn (yellow card) 60'; Tunjić 70'	Report	Quansah 32'; Adli 41'; Tella (yellow card) 60'	Stadium: Fortuna Sittard Stadion; Referee: Jannick van der Laan (Netherlands)

5 August 2025 Friendly	Bayer Leverkusen	3–0	Pisa	Leverkusen
17:00 CEST (UTC+2)	Andrich 4'; Kofane 19'; Palacios 45'; Tapsoba (red card) 53'	Report	Angori (yellow card) 71'	Stadium: BayArena; Attendance: 22,498; Referee: Sascha Stegemann (Germany)

8 August 2025 VisitMalta Weekender	Chelsea	2–0	Bayer Leverkusen	London, England
19:00 BST (UTC+1)	Chalobah (yellow card) 13'; Estêvão 18'; João Pedro 90'	Report	Andrich (yellow card) 7'; Quansah (yellow card) 26'	Stadium: Stamford Bridge; Attendance: 30,000; Referee: Stuart Attwell (England)

== Competitions ==
=== Overall record ===
Competition	First match	Last match	Starting round	Final position	Record							
Competition	First match	Last match	Starting round	Final position	Pld	W	D	L	GF	GA	GD	Win %
Bundesliga	23 August 2025	16 May 2026	Matchday 1	6th	34	17	8	9	68	47	+21	50.00
DFB-Pokal	15 August 2025	22 April 2026	First round	Semi-finals	5	4	0	1	12	4	+8	80.00
UEFA Champions League	18 September 2025	17 March 2026	League phase	Round of 16	12	4	5	3	16	17	−1	33.33
Total					51	25	13	13	96	68	+28	49.02

Source: Soccerway

=== Bundesliga ===
==== League table ====
Pos	Team	Pld	W	D	L	GF	GA	GD	Pts	Qualification or relegation
4	VfB Stuttgart	34	18	8	8	71	49	+22	62	Qualification for the Champions League league phase
5	TSG Hoffenheim	34	18	7	9	65	52	+13	61	Qualification for the Europa League league phase (Note: The 2025–26 DFB-Pokal winners qualified for the Europa League league phase. Since the DFB-Pokal winners, Bayern Munich, qualified for the Champions League, the Europa League spot passed to the sixth-placed team, and the Conference League spot passed to the seventh-placed team.)
6	Bayer Leverkusen	34	17	8	9	68	47	+21	59	Qualification for the Europa League league phase
7	SC Freiburg	34	13	8	13	51	57	−6	47	Qualification for the Conference League play-off round
8	Eintracht Frankfurt	34	11	11	12	61	65	−4	44	

Source: Bundesliga
Rules for classification: 1) Points; 2) Goal difference; 3) Goals scored; 4) Head-to-head results; 5) Head-to-head away goals scored; 6) Away goals scored; 7) Play-off.
(Rules 4–6 only apply after home and away matches have been played between the tied teams.)

==== Results summary ====
Overall								Home						Away					
Pld	W	D	L	GF	GA	GD	Pts	W	D	L	GF	GA	GD	W	D	L	GF	GA	GD
34	17	8	9	68	47	+21	59	9	4	4	38	19	+19	8	4	5	30	28	+2

Source: Kicker

==== Results by round ====
Round	1	2	3	4	5	6	7	8	9	10	11	12	13	14	15	16	18	19	20	21	22	23	24	17^{1}	25	26	27	28	29	30	31	32	33	34
Ground	H	A	H	H	A	H	A	H	A	H	A	H	A	H	A	H	A	H	A	A	H	A	H	A	A	H	A	H	A	H	A	H	A	H
Result	L	D	W	D	W	W	W	W	L	W	W	L	L	W	W	L	L	W	W	D	W	L	D	W	D	D	D	W	W	L	W	W	L	D
Position	12	12	10	11	6	5	5	5	5	5	3	4	4	4	3	4	6	6	6	6	6	6	6	6	6	6	6	6	5	6	6	4	6	6
Points	0	1	4	5	8	11	14	17	17	20	23	23	23	26	29	29	29	32	35	36	39	39	40	43	44	45	46	49	52	52	55	58	58	59

Source: Bundesliga
A = Away; H = Home; W = Win; D = Draw; L = Loss

^{1} Matchday 17 (vs Hamburger SV) was postponed due to weather-related safety concerns.

==== Matches ====
The league fixtures were released on 27 June 2025.

Win Draw Loss Fixtures

23 August 2025 1	Bayer Leverkusen	1–2	TSG Hoffenheim	Leverkusen
15:30 CEST (UTC+2)	Quansah 6'	Report	Asllani 25'; Kramarić (yellow card) 37'; Machida (yellow card) 42'; Avdullahu (yellow card) 45+2'; Lemperle 52'; Tohumcu (yellow card) 86'	Stadium: BayArena; Attendance: 29,390; Referee: Daniel Siebert

30 August 2025 2	Werder Bremen	3–3	Bayer Leverkusen	Bremen
15:30 CEST (UTC+2)	Lynen (yellow card) 37'; Schmid 44' (pen.); Stark (yellow card) 37' (yellow-red card) 63'; Schmidt 76'; Coulibaly 90'	Report	Schick 5', 64' (pen.); Tillman 35'; Kofane (yellow card) 57'; Tella (yellow card) 70'; Quansah (yellow card) 86'	Stadium: Weserstadion; Attendance: 42,100; Referee: Robin Braun

12 September 2025 3	Bayer Leverkusen	3–1	Eintracht Frankfurt	Leverkusen
20:30 CEST (UTC+2)	Grimaldo 10', 90+8'; Andrich (yellow card) 19' (yellow-red card) 59'; Schick 45+4' (pen.); Fernández (yellow card) 78' (yellow-red card) 90+2'; Vázquez (yellow card) 90+4'	Report	Uzun 52', (yellow card) 79'; Wahi (yellow card) 90+4'; Theate (yellow card) 90+7'	Stadium: BayArena; Attendance: 30,210; Referee: Deniz Aytekin

21 September 2025 4	Bayer Leverkusen	1–1	Borussia Mönchengladbach	Leverkusen
17:30 CEST (UTC+2)	Badé (yellow card) 37'; Quansah (yellow card) 39'; Ben Seghir (yellow card) 49'; Tillman 70'; Grimaldo (yellow card) 90+6'; Hofmann (yellow card) 90+6'	Report	Ullrich (yellow card) 8'; Scally (yellow card) 49'; Elvedi (yellow card) 74'; Diks (yellow card) 89'; Tabaković 90+2'; Ranos (yellow card) 90+4'	Stadium: BayArena; Attendance: 30,210; Referee: Felix Zwayer

27 September 2025 5	FC St. Pauli	1–2	Bayer Leverkusen	Hamburg
15:30 CEST (UTC+2)	Wahl 32'; Fujita (yellow card) 50'; Smith (yellow card) 86'; Ceesay (yellow card) 90+8'	Report	Quansah (yellow card) 21'; Tapsoba 25'; Poku 58'; Vázquez (yellow card) 60'; Fernández (yellow card) 90+2'; Badé (yellow card) 90+2'; Kofane (yellow card) 90+9'	Stadium: Millerntor-Stadion; Attendance: 29,546; Referee: Martin Petersen

4 October 2025 6	Bayer Leverkusen	2–0	Union Berlin	Leverkusen
15:30 CEST (UTC+2)	Poku 33'; Kofane (yellow card) 45+6', (goal) 49'	Report	Leite (yellow card) 66'; Trimmel (yellow card) 68'; Köhn (yellow card) 76'	Stadium: BayArena; Attendance: 30,210; Referee: Christian Dingert

18 October 2025 7	Mainz 05	3–4	Bayer Leverkusen	Mainz
15:30 CEST (UTC+2)	Lee 34'; Kohr (yellow card) 37'; Amiri 71' (pen.), (yellow card) 90+3'; Hanche-Olsen (yellow card) 78'; Sieb 90'; Bøving (yellow card) 90+10'	Report	Grimaldo 11' (pen.), 45+3', (yellow card) 68'; Kofane 24'; Tapsoba (yellow card) 67'; Badé (yellow card) 81'; Ben Seghir (yellow card) 83'; Terrier 87'	Stadium: Mewa Arena; Attendance: 33,305; Referee: Florian Exner

26 October 2025 8	Bayer Leverkusen	2–0	SC Freiburg	Leverkusen
15:30 CET (UTC+1)	Poku 22'; García (yellow card) 38'; Tapsoba 52'	Report	Lienhart (yellow card) 15' (yellow-red card) 74'	Stadium: BayArena; Attendance: 30,210; Referee: Harm Osmers

1 November 2025 9	Bayern Munich	3–0	Bayer Leverkusen	Munich
18:30 CET (UTC+1)	Gnabry 25'; Jackson 31'; Badé 44' (o.g.); Goretzka (yellow card) 90+1'	Report	Maza (yellow card) 65'	Stadium: Allianz Arena; Attendance: 75,000; Referee: Deniz Aytekin

8 November 2025 10	Bayer Leverkusen	6–0	1. FC Heidenheim	Leverkusen
15:30 CET (UTC+1)	Schick 2', 22'; Hofmann 16'; Poku 27'; Maza 45+1', 53'	Report	Schöppner (yellow card) 36'	Stadium: BayArena; Attendance: 29,257; Referee: Bastian Dankert

22 November 2025 11	VfL Wolfsburg	1–3	Bayer Leverkusen	Wolfsburg
15:30 CET (UTC+1)	Pejčinović (yellow card) 38'; Amoura (yellow card) 40'; Vavro 57'	Report	Hofmann 9'; Tapsoba 25'; Tillman 33'; Andrich (yellow card) 76'	Stadium: Volkswagen Arena; Attendance: 25,036; Referee: Robert Hartmann

29 November 2025 12	Bayer Leverkusen	1–2	Borussia Dortmund	Leverkusen
18:30 CET (UTC+1)	Tillman (yellow card) 30'; Tapsoba (yellow card) 40'; Kofane 83'; García (yellow card) 90+4'	Report	Schlotterbeck (yellow card) 11'; Anselmino 41'; Ryerson (yellow card) 54'; Adeyemi 65'; Silva (yellow card) 82'; Couto (yellow card) 88'	Stadium: BayArena; Attendance: 30,210; Referee: Tobias Welz

6 December 2025 13	FC Augsburg	2–0	Bayer Leverkusen	Augsburg
15:30 CET (UTC+1)	Giannoulis 6'; Banks (yellow card) 10'; Kade (yellow card) 17', (goal) 28'; Jakić (yellow card) 77'; Essende (yellow card) 90+3'	Report	Tapsoba (yellow card) 71'; Tella (yellow card) 77'; Quansah (yellow card) 78'	Stadium: WWK Arena; Attendance: 30,000; Referee: Sven Jablonski

13 December 2025 14	Bayer Leverkusen	2–0	1. FC Köln	Leverkusen
18:30 CET (UTC+1)	Arthur (yellow card) 51'; Terrier 66'; Andrich 72'; Quansah (yellow card) 74'	Report	Martel (yellow card) 5'	Stadium: BayArena; Attendance: 30,210; Referee: Harm Osmers

20 December 2025 15	RB Leipzig	1–3	Bayer Leverkusen	Leipzig
18:30 CET (UTC+1)	Schlager 35'; Lukeba (yellow card) 90+11'	Report	Arthur (yellow card) 31'; Terrier 40'; Schick 44'; Tape (yellow card) 87'; Culbreath 90+7'	Stadium: Red Bull Arena; Attendance: 46,053; Referee: Benjamin Brand

10 January 2026 16	Bayer Leverkusen	1–4	VfB Stuttgart	Leverkusen
18:30 CET (UTC+1)	Flekken (yellow card) 38'; Grimaldo 66' (pen.), (yellow card) 79'; Badé (yellow card) 70'; García (yellow card) 80'	Report	Leweling 7', 45', (yellow card) 38'; Mittelstädt 29' (pen.); Undav 45+2'; Jeltsch (yellow card) 77'	Stadium: BayArena; Attendance: 30,210; Referee: Felix Zwayer

17 January 2026 18	TSG Hoffenheim	1–0	Bayer Leverkusen	Sinsheim
15:30 CET (UTC+1)	Burger 9', (yellow card) 48'; Hranáč (yellow card) 62'	Report	Quansah (yellow card) 84'	Stadium: PreZero Arena; Attendance: 26,957; Referee: Daniel Schlager

24 January 2026 19	Bayer Leverkusen	1–0	Werder Bremen	Leverkusen
15:30 CET (UTC+1)	Vázquez 37'; Hofmann (yellow card) 78'; Badé (yellow card) 87'	Report	Friedl (yellow card) 78'; Malatini (yellow card) 88'; Deman (yellow card) 90+6'	Stadium: BayArena; Attendance: 30,210; Referee: Tobias Reichel

31 January 2026 20	Eintracht Frankfurt	1–3	Bayer Leverkusen	Frankfurt
15:30 CET (UTC+1)	Koch 50'; Kristensen (yellow card) 54'; Skhiri (yellow card) 69' (yellow-red card) 71'	Report	Arthur 26'; Tillman 33'; Grimaldo (yellow card) 63'; García 90+3'	Stadium: Deutsche Bank Park; Attendance: 59,000; Referee: Robert Schröder

7 February 2026 21	Borussia Mönchengladbach	1–1	Bayer Leverkusen	Mönchengladbach
18:30 CET (UTC+1)	Engelhardt 10'; Diks (yellow card) 27'; Stöger (yellow card) 68'	Report	Sander 44' (o.g.); Palacios (yellow card) 68'; Terrier (yellow card) 84'; Schick (yellow card) 85'	Stadium: Borussia-Park; Attendance: 47,599; Referee: Christian Dingert

14 February 2026 22	Bayer Leverkusen	4–0	FC St. Pauli	Leverkusen
15:30 CET (UTC+1)	Quansah 13'; Schick 14'; Tapsoba 52'; Poku 78'	Report	Mets (yellow card) 90+2'	Stadium: BayArena; Attendance: 30,210; Referee: Sven Jablonski

21 February 2026 23	Union Berlin	1–0	Bayer Leverkusen	Berlin
15:30 CET (UTC+1)	Nsoki (yellow card) 3'; Haberer (yellow card) 10'; Khedira 28'; Ilić (yellow card) 44'; Querfeld (yellow card) 60'; Rønnow (yellow card) 90+3'	Report	Hofmann (yellow card) 84'; Andrich (yellow card) 88'	Stadium: Stadion An der Alten Försterei; Attendance: 22,012; Referee: Harm Osmers

28 February 2026 24	Bayer Leverkusen	1–1	Mainz 05	Leverkusen
15:30 CET (UTC+1)	Tapsoba (yellow card) 66'; Quansah 88'	Report	Posch (yellow card) 66'; Becker 67'; Maloney (yellow card) 90+2'	Stadium: BayArena; Attendance: 30,210; Referee: Tobias Stieler

4 March 2026 17	Hamburger SV	0–1	Bayer Leverkusen	Hamburg
20:30 CET (UTC+1)		Report	García (yellow card) 40'; Kofane 73'; Palacios (yellow card) 90+5'	Stadium: Volksparkstadion; Attendance: 57,000; Referee: Sören Storks
Note: The match was originally scheduled for 13 January 2026, but was postponed due to weather-related safety concerns.

7 March 2026 25	SC Freiburg	3–3	Bayer Leverkusen	Freiburg
15:30 CET (UTC+1)	Grifo 34'; Suzuki 43'; Scherhant (yellow card) 70'; Irié (yellow card) 78'; Ginter 86'; Günter (yellow card) 90+3'	Report	Kofane 37'; Grimaldo 45+3', (yellow card) 51'; Terrier 52'; Quansah (yellow card) 82'; Andrich (yellow card) 90+2'	Stadium: Europa-Park Stadion; Attendance: 34,100; Referee: Benjamin Brand

14 March 2026 26	Bayer Leverkusen	1–1	Bayern Munich	Leverkusen
15:30 CET (UTC+1)	García 6'; Fernández (yellow card) 56'; Andrich (yellow card) 74'; Tapsoba (yellow card) 90+5'	Report	Tah (yellow card) 32'; Jackson (red card) 42'; Díaz 69', (yellow card) 74' (yellow-red card) 84'; Ulreich (yellow card) 90+7'	Stadium: BayArena; Attendance: 30,210; Referee: Christian Dingert

21 March 2026 27	1. FC Heidenheim	3–3	Bayer Leverkusen	Heidenheim
15:30 CET (UTC+1)	Schöppner (yellow card) 25'; Behrens 56'; Kerber (yellow card) 64'; Pieringer 72' (pen.), 85'; Beck (yellow card) 90'; Busch (yellow card) 90+6'	Report	Tillman 22'; Schick 35', 79', (yellow card) 39'; García (yellow card) 74'; Maza (yellow card) 83'; Quansah (yellow card) 89'	Stadium: Voith-Arena; Attendance: 15,000; Referee: Robin Braun

4 April 2026 28	Bayer Leverkusen	6–3	VfL Wolfsburg	Leverkusen
15:30 CEST (UTC+2)	Grimaldo 30' (pen.), 44'; Tapsoba (yellow card) 37', (goal) 68'; Schick 53' (pen.); Maza 73'; Tillman 90+6'	Report	Wind 16'; Mæhle (yellow card) 29', (goal) 31'; Eriksen 38' (pen.); Koulierakis (yellow card) 55'; Vavro (yellow card) 71'	Stadium: BayArena; Attendance: 29,619; Referee: Martin Petersen

11 April 2026 29	Borussia Dortmund	0–1	Bayer Leverkusen	Dortmund
15:30 CEST (UTC+2)	Bensebaini (yellow card) 5'; Guirassy (yellow card) 45'; Beier (yellow card) 63'	Report	Andrich 42'	Stadium: Signal Iduna Park; Attendance: 81,365; Referee: Deniz Aytekin

18 April 2026 30	Bayer Leverkusen	1–2	FC Augsburg	Leverkusen
15:30 CEST (UTC+2)	Schick 12'; Quansah (yellow card) 48'; García (yellow card) 86'	Report	Rieder 15', 90+7' (pen.), (yellow card) 52'	Stadium: BayArena; Attendance: 29,282; Referee: Benjamin Brand

25 April 2026 31	1. FC Köln	1–2	Bayer Leverkusen	Cologne
15:30 CEST (UTC+2)	Jóhannesson (yellow card) 45'; Waldschmidt 78'	Report	Tapsoba (yellow card) 10'; Schick 43' (pen.), 52'; Blaswich (yellow card) 90+5'	Stadium: RheinEnergieStadion; Attendance: 50,000; Referee: Robert Hartmann

2 May 2026 32	Bayer Leverkusen	4–1	RB Leipzig	Leverkusen
18:30 CEST (UTC+2)	Schick 25', 76', 90'; Tella 45'; Tillman (yellow card) 86'	Report	Finkgräfe (yellow card) 14'; Schlager (yellow card) 72'; Baumgartner 80'	Stadium: BayArena; Attendance: 30,210; Referee: Tobias Welz

9 May 2026 33	VfB Stuttgart	3–1	Bayer Leverkusen	Stuttgart
15:30 CEST (UTC+2)	Demirović 6'; Mittelstädt 45+7' (pen.); Undav 58'; Führich (yellow card) 80'; Tomás (yellow card) 90+7'	Report	García 1'; Palacios (yellow card) 90+7'	Stadium: MHPArena; Attendance: 60,000; Referee: Robert Schröder

16 May 2026 34	Bayer Leverkusen	1–1	Hamburger SV	Leverkusen
15:30 CEST (UTC+2)	Schick (penalty missed) 25'; Arthur (yellow card) 66'; Quansah 78'	Report	Torunarigha (yellow card) 24'; Vieira 61'; Capaldo (yellow card) 78'	Stadium: BayArena; Attendance: 30,210; Referee: Tobias Stieler

=== DFB-Pokal ===
The second round draw was held on 31 August 2025.

15 August 2025 First round	Sonnenhof Großaspach	0–4	Bayer Leverkusen	Aspach
18:00 CEST (UTC+2)	Kleinschrodt (yellow card) 61'; Çeliktaş (yellow card) 64' (yellow-red card) 66'; Tasdelen (red card)	Report	Schick 32'; Adli (yellow card) 43'; Tapsoba (yellow card) 47'; Arthur 74'; Kofane 84'; Grimaldo 87' (pen.)	Stadium: WIRmachenDRUCK Arena; Attendance: 8,850; Referee: Micheal Bacher
Note: The match initially kicked off at 18:00, but was suspended at 18:17 due to heavy hail hitting the pitch. The match continued from 19:00.

29 October 2025 Second round	SC Paderborn	2–4 (a.e.t.)	Bayer Leverkusen	Paderborn
18:00 CET (UTC+1)	Götze (red card) 58'; Marino 90', (yellow card) 110'; Michel 96'; Obermair (yellow card) 108'; Baur (yellow card) 119'	Report	García (yellow card) 44', (goal) 120+4'; Grimaldo 60'; Andrich (yellow card) 82'; Quansah 105+1'; Maza 120+2'	Stadium: Home Deluxe Arena; Attendance: 15,000; Referee: Patrick Ittrich

2 December 2025 Round of 16	Borussia Dortmund	0–1	Bayer Leverkusen	Dortmund
21:00 CET (UTC+1)	Anton (yellow card) 68'; Bellingham (yellow card) 71'; Can (yellow card) 90'	Report	Maza 34'; Andrich (yellow card) 75'; Tillman (yellow card) 87'	Stadium: Signal Iduna Park; Attendance: 81,365; Referee: Tobias Stieler

3 February 2026 Quarter-finals	Bayer Leverkusen	3–0	FC St. Pauli	Leverkusen
20:45 CET (UTC+1)	Terrier 32'; García (yellow card) 44'; Schick 63'; Hofmann 90+2'	Report	Fujita (yellow card) 19'; Ando (yellow card) 50'	Stadium: BayArena; Attendance: 30,210; Referee: Florian Badstübner

22 April 2026 Semi-finals	Bayer Leverkusen	0–2	Bayern Munich	Leverkusen
20:45 CEST (UTC+2)	Tapsoba (yellow card) 38'; Grimaldo (yellow card) 76'	Report	Kane 22'; Pavlović (yellow card) 43'; Díaz 90+3'	Stadium: BayArena; Attendance: 30,210; Referee: Felix Zwayer

=== UEFA Champions League ===
==== League phase ====
The draw for the league phase was held on 28 August 2025.

Pos	Team	Pld	W	D	L	GF	GA	GD	Pts	Qualification
14	(Royal Spanish Football Federation) Atlético Madrid	8	4	1	3	17	15	+2	13	Advance to knockout phase play-offs (seeded)
15	(Italian Football Federation) Atalanta	8	4	1	3	10	10	0	13	Advance to knockout phase play-offs (seeded)
16	(German Football Association) Bayer Leverkusen	8	3	3	2	13	14	−1	12	Advance to knockout phase play-offs (seeded)
17	(German Football Association) Borussia Dortmund	8	3	2	3	19	17	+2	11	Advance to knockout phase play-offs (unseeded)
18	(Hellenic Football Federation) Olympiacos	8	3	2	3	10	14	−4	11	Advance to knockout phase play-offs (unseeded)

Source: UEFA
Rules for classification: League phase tiebreakers

Round	1	2	3	4	5	6	7	8
Ground	A	H	H	A	A	H	A	H
Result	D	D	L	W	W	D	L	W
Position	17	25	30	21	17	20	20	16
Points	1	2	2	5	8	9	9	12

Source: UEFA
A = Away; H = Home; W = Win; D = Draw; L = Loss

18 September 2025 1	Copenhagen (Denmark)	2–2	(Germany) Bayer Leverkusen	Copenhagen, Denmark
18:45 CEST (UTC+2)	Larsson 9'; López (yellow card) 33'; Chatzidiakos (yellow card) 44'; Delaney (yellow card) 53'; Robert 87'	Report	Vázquez (yellow card) 62'; Grimaldo 82'; Tapsoba (yellow card) 89'; Hatzidiakos 90+1' (o.g.)	Stadium: Parken Stadium; Attendance: 34,504; Referee: Aliyar Aghayev (Azerbaijan)

1 October 2025 2	Bayer Leverkusen (Germany)	1–1	(Netherlands) PSV Eindhoven	Leverkusen
21:00 CEST (UTC+2)	Kofane 65'	Report	Til (yellow card) 64'; Saibari 72', (yellow card) 90+2'	Stadium: BayArena; Attendance: 30,210; Referee: Glenn Nyberg (Sweden)

21 October 2025 3	Bayer Leverkusen (Germany)	2–7	(France) Paris Saint-Germain	Leverkusen
21:00 CEST (UTC+2)	Grimaldo (penalty missed) 25'; Andrich (red card) 31'; García 38' (pen.), 54'; Echeverri (yellow card) 43'; Tapsoba (yellow card) 45+1'	Report	Pacho 7'; Zabarnyi (yellow card) 24', (red card) 37'; Doué 41', 45+3'; Kvaratskhelia 44'; Mendes 50'; Dembélé 66'; Vitinha 90'	Stadium: BayArena; Attendance: 30,210; Referee: Jesús Gil Manzano (Spain)

5 November 2025 4	Benfica (Portugal)	0–1	(Germany) Bayer Leverkusen	Lisbon, Portugal
20:00 WET (UTC+0)	Lukébakio (yellow card) 62'; Otamendi (yellow card) 78'	Report	Maza (yellow card) 41'; Tapsoba (yellow card) 55'; Schick 65'; Tillman (yellow card) 79'	Stadium: Estádio da Luz; Attendance: 55,796; Referee: Simone Sozza (Italy)

25 November 2025 5	Manchester City (England)	0–2	(Germany) Bayer Leverkusen	Manchester, England
20:00 GMT (UTC+0)		Report	Grimaldo 23', (yellow card) 60'; Schick 54'; Kofane (yellow card) 78'	Stadium: City of Manchester Stadium; Attendance: 50,592; Referee: João Pinheiro (Portugal)

10 December 2025 6	Bayer Leverkusen (Germany)	2–2	(England) Newcastle United	Leverkusen
21:00 CET (UTC+1)	Bruno Guimarães 13' (o.g.); Poku (yellow card) 47'; García (yellow card) 50'; Grimaldo 88'	Report	Thiaw (yellow card) 21'; Gordon 51' (pen.); Miley 74'; Ramsdale (yellow card) 82'	Stadium: BayArena; Attendance: 30,210; Referee: Serdar Gözübüyük (Netherlands)

20 January 2026 7	Olympiacos (Greece)	2–0	(Germany) Bayer Leverkusen	Piraeus, Greece
22:00 EET (UTC+2)	Costinha 2'; Retsos (yellow card) 5'; Taremi 45+1', (yellow card) 73'	Report	Kofane (yellow card) 29'	Stadium: Karaiskakis Stadium; Attendance: 32,400; Referee: Maurizio Mariani (Italy)

28 January 2026 8	Bayer Leverkusen (Germany)	3–0	(Spain) Villarreal	Leverkusen
21:00 CET (UTC+1)	Tillman 12', 35'; Grimaldo 57'	Report	Navarro (yellow card) 45+1'; Marín (yellow card) 52'; Pépé (yellow card) 56'	Stadium: BayArena; Attendance: 30,210; Referee: Espen Eskås (Norway)

==== Knockout phase ====
===== Knockout phase play-offs =====
The draw for the knockout phase play-offs was held on 30 January 2026.

18 February 2026 First leg	Olympiacos (Greece)	0–2	(Germany) Bayer Leverkusen	Piraeus, Greece
22:00 EET (UTC+2)	El Kaabi (yellow card) 13'	Report	García (yellow card) 42'; Schick 60', 63'	Stadium: Karaiskakis Stadium; Attendance: 32,300; Referee: João Pinheiro (Portugal)

24 February 2026 Second leg	Bayer Leverkusen (Germany)	0–0 (2–0 agg.)	(Greece) Olympiacos	Leverkusen
21:00 CET (UTC+1)		Report	Pirola (yellow card) 90+3'	Stadium: BayArena; Attendance: 30,210; Referee: Michael Oliver (England)

===== Round of 16 =====
The draw for the round of 16 was held on 27 February 2026.

11 March 2026 First leg	Bayer Leverkusen (Germany)	1–1	(England) Arsenal	Leverkusen
18:45 CET (UTC+1)	Andrich (yellow card) 2', (goal) 46'; Poku (yellow card) 58'; Palacios (yellow card) 63'; Grimaldo (yellow card) 90+4'	Report	Martinelli (yellow card) 26'; Zubimendi (yellow card) 69'; Havertz 89' (pen.), (yellow card) 90+4'	Stadium: BayArena; Attendance: 30,210; Referee: Halil Umut Meler (Turkey)

17 March 2026 Second leg	Arsenal (England)	2–0 (3–1 agg.)	(Germany) Bayer Leverkusen	London, England
20:00 GMT (UTC+0)	Eze 36'; Rice 63'	Report	Palacios (yellow card) 46'	Stadium: Emirates Stadium; Attendance: 57,537; Referee: Danny Makkelie (Netherlands)

== Statistics ==
=== Appearances and goals ===
No.	Pos	Nat	Player	Total		Bundesliga		DFB-Pokal		Champions League	
No.	Pos	Nat	Player	Apps	Goals	Apps	Goals	Apps	Goals	Apps	Goals
Goalkeepers
1	GK	(Netherlands) NED	Mark Flekken	34	0	24	0	4	0	6	0
18	GK	(Switzerland) SUI	Jonas Omlin	0	0	0	0	0	0	0	0
28	GK	(Germany) GER	Janis Blaswich	18	0	10+1	0	1	0	6	0
36	GK	(Germany) GER	Niklas Lomb	0	0	0	0	0	0	0	0
Defenders
4	DF	(England) ENG	Jarell Quansah	44	5	25+3	4	4+1	1	11	0
5	DF	(France) FRA	Loïc Badé	34	0	19+4	0	1+2	0	6+2	0
12	DF	(Burkina Faso) BFA	Edmond Tapsoba	44	5	29	5	5	0	9+1	0
13	DF	(Brazil) BRA	Arthur	31	2	13+7	1	2+1	1	3+5	0
15	DF	(Germany) GER	Tim Oermann	2	0	0+2	0	0	0	0	0
16	DF	(France) FRA	Axel Tape	8	0	2+4	0	0+1	0	1	0
20	DF	(Spain) ESP	Álex Grimaldo	46	14	29	8	4+1	2	12	4
21	DF	(Spain) ESP	Lucas Vázquez	19	0	6+6	0	2	0	5	0
Midfielders
6	MF	(Argentina) ARG	Equi Fernández	30	0	12+8	0	0+1	0	5+4	0
7	MF	(Germany) GER	Jonas Hofmann	28	3	11+12	2	3	1	1+1	0
8	MF	(Germany) GER	Robert Andrich	46	3	29+3	2	5	0	9	1
10	MF	(United States) USA	Malik Tillman	42	8	18+11	6	1+2	0	5+5	2
17	MF	(Morocco) MAR	Eliesse Ben Seghir	15	0	2+8	0	1	0	1+3	0
23	MF	(Nigeria) NGR	Nathan Tella	22	1	10+7	1	2+1	0	0+2	0
24	MF	(Spain) ESP	Aleix García	50	6	31+2	3	5	1	11+1	2
25	MF	(Argentina) ARG	Exequiel Palacios	25	0	12+6	0	2	0	4+1	0
27	MF	(Germany) GER	Jeremiah Mensah	2	0	0	0	0+1	0	0+1	0
Forwards
11	FW	(France) FRA	Martin Terrier	24	5	7+11	4	2+1	1	2+1	0
14	FW	(Czech Republic) CZE	Patrik Schick	43	22	23+5	16	4+1	2	7+3	4
19	FW	(Netherlands) NED	Ernest Poku	45	5	16+13	5	1+3	0	9+3	0
30	FW	(Algeria) ALG	Ibrahim Maza	44	5	20+8	3	3+1	2	9+3	0
35	FW	(Cameroon) CMR	Christian Kofane	44	7	12+17	5	1+3	1	7+4	1
42	FW	(Germany) GER	Montrell Culbreath	16	1	8+4	1	0+1	0	0+3	0
Players transferred/loaned out during the season
3	DF	(Ecuador) ECU	Piero Hincapié	2	0	1	0	1	0	0	0
9	MF	(Argentina) ARG	Claudio Echeverri	11	0	1+5	0	0	0	2+3	0
18	FW	(Argentina) ARG	Alejo Sarco	3	0	0+3	0	0	0	0	0
21	MF	(Morocco) MAR	Amine Adli	1	0	0	0	1	0	0	0
44	DF	(France) FRA	Jeanuël Belocian	11	0	3+5	0	1	0	1+1	0

Last updated: 16 May 2026
Source: Competitions
