= Robert Andrich =

German footballer (born 1994)

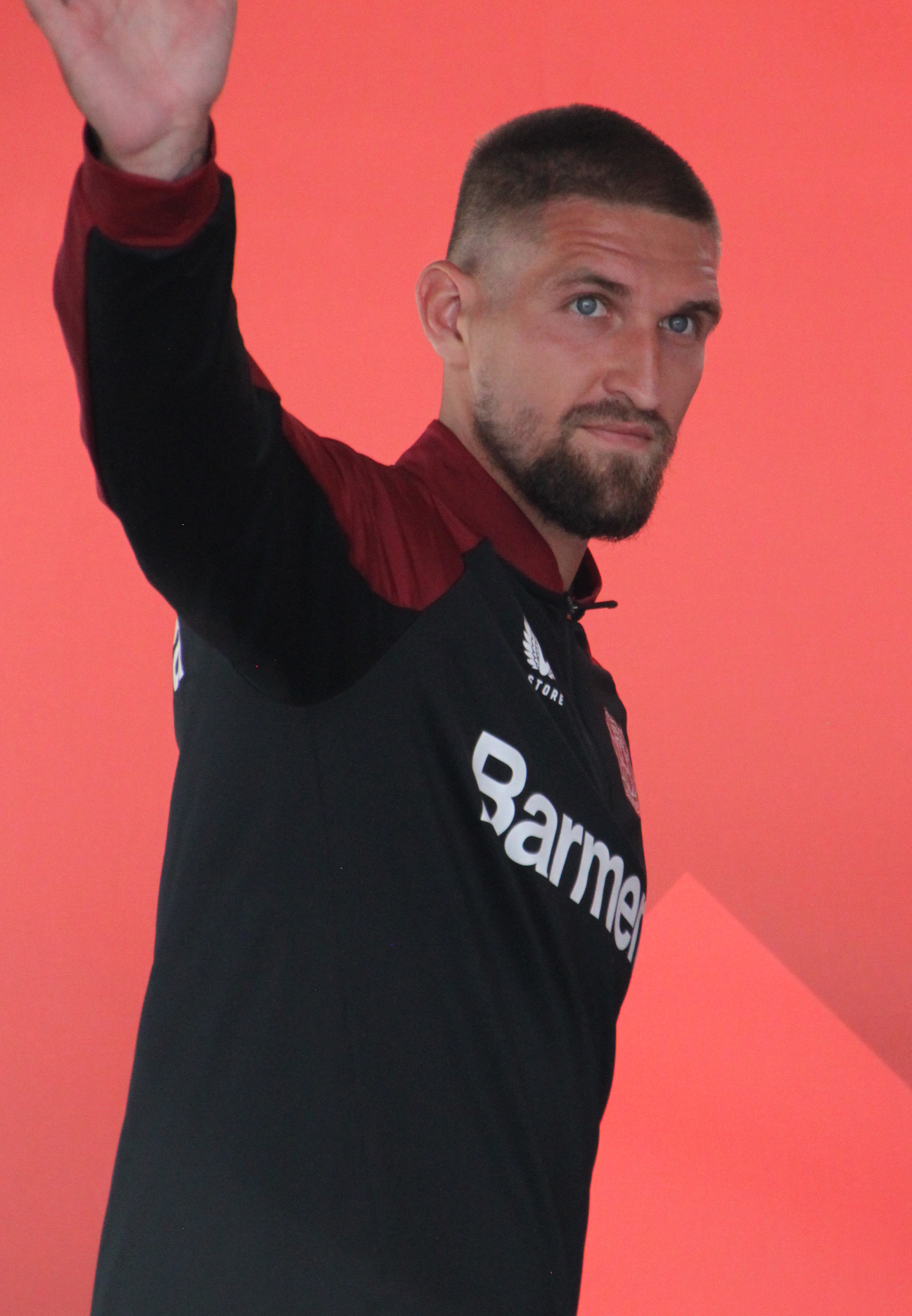
- Andrich with Bayer Leverkusen in 2022

Personal information
- Full name: Robert Andrich
- Date of birth: 22 September 1994 (age 32)
- Place of birth: Potsdam, Germany
- Height: 1.87 m (6 ft 2 in)
- Positions: Defensive midfielder; centre-back

Team information
- Current team: Bayer Leverkusen
- Number: 8

Youth career
- –2003: FV Turbine Potsdam
- 2003–2012: Hertha BSC

Senior career*
Years	Team	Apps	(Gls)
2012–2015	Hertha BSC II	52	(11)
2012–2015	Hertha BSC	0	(0)
2015–2016	Dynamo Dresden	21	(1)
2016–2018	SV Wehen Wiesbaden	59	(7)
2018–2019	1. FC Heidenheim	25	(4)
2019–2021	Union Berlin	59	(6)
2021–	Bayer Leverkusen	143	(15)

International career^{‡}
2011–2012	Germany U18	9	(0)
2012–2013	Germany U19	8	(0)
2013	Germany U20	2	(0)
2023–	Germany	19	(0)
- * Club domestic league appearances and goals as of 31 October 2026 ‡ National team caps and goals as of 15:45, 14 October 2025 (UTC)

Robert Andrich (German pronunciation: [ˈʁoːbɐt ˈandʁɪç]; born 22 September 1994) is a German professional footballer who plays as a defensive midfielder or centre-back for Bundesliga club Bayer Leverkusen and the Germany national team.

== Club career ==
Andrich started his career at FV Turbine Potsdam and moved to Hertha BSC in 2003. He played for Hertha's youth teams in the Under 17 Bundesliga and Under 19 Bundesliga. Starting from the 2012–13 season, he played for Hertha's second team in the Regionalliga Nordost, the fourth tier of German football. He was also included in Hertha's first team squad twice during the 2012–13 season, but did not make an appearance. In March 2013, he signed a professional contract until June 2015, but did not make any competitive appearances for the first team.

In February 2015, Andrich moved to 3. Liga side Dynamo Dresden, where he signed a contract until June 2017. He made his debut in professional football on 7 February 2016 in a 1–0 defeat against Rot-Weiß Erfurt. On 19 March 2016, he scored his first goal for Dresden in a 2–2 draw against Hansa Rostock. After only appearing in eight league matches in the 2015–16 season, he left Dresden and moved to 3. Liga rivals SV Wehen Wiesbaden in June 2016. In January 2018, it was announced that Andrich would join 2. Bundesliga team 1. FC Heidenheim for the 2018–19 season. He scored his first goal in the 2. Bundesliga in a 2–1 away win against Arminia Bielefeld on 22 December 2018.

For the 2019–20 season, he moved to newly-promoted Bundesliga side Union Berlin, where he signed a contract until 30 June 2022. He made his debut in Germany's top flight on 18 August 2019 in a 4–0 home defeat against RB Leipzig. He scored his first Bundesliga goal on 7 June 2020 in a 1–1 draw against Schalke 04. In total, he appeared in 59 league matches for Union, scoring six goals.

After two seasons with Union Berlin, Andrich moved to fellow Bundesliga side Bayer Leverkusen in summer 2021, signing a five-year-contract until 2026. On 13 September 2022, he scored his first Champions League goal in a 2–0 win over Atlético Madrid during the 2022–23 season. In May 2023, Andrich suffered a fracture to his foot, bringing his 2022–23 season to a premature end.

On 27 April 2024, he scored a goal in the 96th minute of stoppage time in a 2–2 draw against VfB Stuttgart, to extend Leverkusen's unbeaten streak in all competitions in their 2023–24 season. A few days later, on 2 May, he scored from outside the penalty area in a 2–0 away win over Roma in the Europa League semi-final first leg. At the end of the 2023–24 season, Andrich won the Bundesliga title and the German Cup with Leverkusen and also reached the Europa League final, in which his team lost 3–0 to Atalanta. On 16 August 2024, he extended his contract with Leverkusen until 2028. He was named as club's captain ahead of the 2025–26 season, succeeding Lukas Hradecky. Ahead of the 2026–27 season, head coach Carles Martínez Novell replaced Andrich as captain with Edmond Tapsoba and encouraged Andrich to seek a new club due to his reduced role in the team.

== International career ==
Andrich played for German youth national teams between 2011 and 2013.

In October 2023, he received his first call-up to the German senior national team for two friendly matches against the United States and Mexico. Later that year, on 21 November, he made his international debut in a friendly match against Austria.

Andrich was named in Germany's squad for UEFA Euro 2024. He appeared in all five of Germany's matches at the tournament until their elimination in the quarter-finals against Spain. His potential first international goal against Switzerland in the final group stage match of the tournament was disallowed by VAR, because his teammate Jamal Musiala committed a foul just before he took the shot from outside the box against Swiss goalkeeper Yann Sommer.

== Personal life ==
Andrich's uncle Frieder was also a footballer who played in the DDR-Oberliga.

Andrich is married since 2019 and has two children with his wife Alicia.

== Career statistics ==
=== Club ===
As of match played 31 October 2026

Appearances and goals by club, season and competition
Club	Season	League			DFB-Pokal		Europe		Other		Total	
Club	Season	Division	Apps	Goals	Apps	Goals	Apps	Goals	Apps	Goals	Apps	Goals
Hertha BSC II	2012–13	Regionalliga Nordost	16	1	—		—		—		16	1
Hertha BSC II	2013–14	Regionalliga Nordost	22	2	—		—		—		22	2
Hertha BSC II	2014–15	Regionalliga Nordost	14	8	—		—		—		14	8
Hertha BSC II	Total		52	11	—		—		—		52	11
Dynamo Dresden	2014–15	3. Liga	13	0	1	0	—		—		14	0
Dynamo Dresden	2015–16	3. Liga	8	1	—		—		3 (Note: Appearances in Saxony Cup)	0	11	1
Dynamo Dresden	Total		21	1	1	0	—		3	0	25	1
SV Wehen Wiesbaden	2016–17	3. Liga	31	3	—		—		4 (Note: Appearances in Hessian Cup)	0	35	3
SV Wehen Wiesbaden	2017–18	3. Liga	28	4	2	0	—		2	1	32	5
SV Wehen Wiesbaden	Total		59	7	2	0	—		6	1	67	8
1. FC Heidenheim	2018–19	2. Bundesliga	25	4	2	0	—		—		27	4
Union Berlin	2019–20	Bundesliga	30	1	4	3	—		—		34	4
Union Berlin	2020–21	Bundesliga	29	5	2	0	—		—		31	5
Union Berlin	2021–22	Bundesliga	0	0	1	0	—		—		1	0
Union Berlin	Total		59	6	7	3	—		—		66	9
Bayer Leverkusen	2021–22	Bundesliga	26	4	1	0	5 (Note: Appearances in UEFA Europa League)	3	—		32	7
Bayer Leverkusen	2022–23	Bundesliga	29	2	1	0	11 (Note: Five appearances and one goal in UEFA Champions League, six appearances in UEFA Europa League)	1	—		41	3
Bayer Leverkusen	2023–24	Bundesliga	28	4	6	1	11	1	—		45	6
Bayer Leverkusen	2024–25	Bundesliga	23	2	4	0	7 (Note: Appearances in UEFA Champions League)	0	1 (Note: Appearance in DFL-Supercup)	0	35	2
Bayer Leverkusen	2025–26	Bundesliga	32	2	4	0	9	1	—		45	3
Bayer Leverkusen	2026–27	Bundesliga	5	1	1	0	2	0	—		8	1
Bayer Leverkusen	Total		143	15	17	1	45	6	1	0	206	22
Career total			359	44	29	4	45	6	10	1	443	55

=== International ===
As of match played 13 October 2025

Appearances and goals by national team and year
National team	Year	Apps	Goals
Germany
Germany	2023	1	0
Germany	2024	15	0
Germany	2025	3	0
Total		19	0

== Honours ==
Dynamo Dresden

- 3. Liga: 2015–16

Wehen Wiesbaden

- Hessenpokal: 2017

Bayer Leverkusen

- Bundesliga: 2023–24
- DFB-Pokal: 2023–24
- DFL-Supercup: 2024
- UEFA Europa League runner-up: 2023–24
