= Equi Fernández =

Argentine footballer

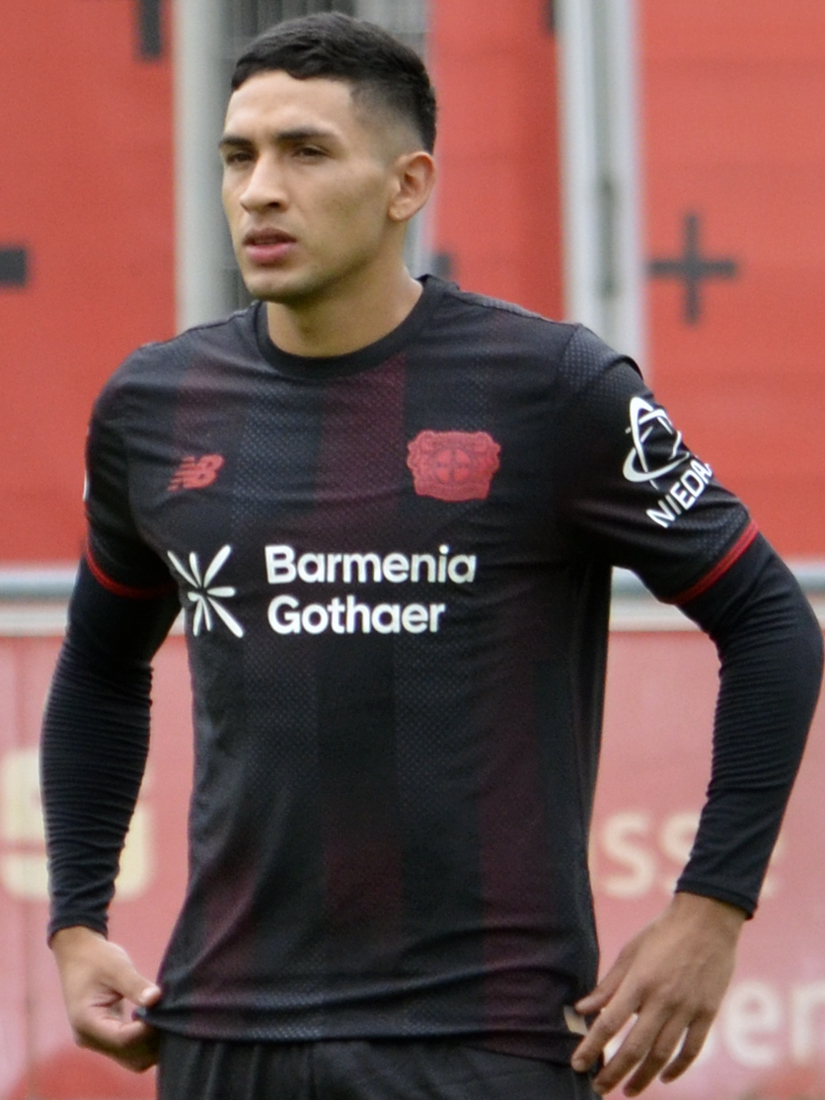
- Fernández with Bayer Leverkusen in 2025

Personal information
- Full name: Ignacio Ezequiel Agustín Fernández Carballo
- Date of birth: 25 July 2002 (age 24)
- Place of birth: Buenos Aires, Argentina
- Height: 1.78 m (5 ft 10 in)
- Position: Midfielder

Team information
- Current team: Bayer Leverkusen
- Number: 6

Youth career
- 2012-2021: Boca Juniors

Senior career*
Years	Team	Apps	(Gls)
2021–2024	Boca Juniors	26	(2)
2022	→ Tigre (loan)	25	(0)
2024–2025	Al-Qadsiah	32	(1)
2025–	Bayer Leverkusen	28	(1)

International career^{‡}
2019	Argentina U17	13	(1)
2023–2024	Argentina U23	11	(1)
2026–	Argentina	1	(0)
- * Club domestic league appearances and goals as of 17:30, 31 October 2026 (UTC) ‡ National team caps and goals as of 10:21, 1 October 2026 (UTC)

Ignacio Ezequiel Agustín Fernández Carballo (born 25 July 2002), better known as Equi Fernández, is an Argentine professional footballer who plays as a midfielder for Bundesliga club Bayer Leverkusen and the Argentina national team.

== Club career ==
=== Boca Juniors ===
Fernández started to play in Boca Juniors in 2012, after an agreement signed with Barcelona through which both clubs committed to collaborate in youth players training. He debuted as professional in May 2021, when Boca Juniors was defeated by Patronato 1–0, where he stayed 60 minutes on field.

He was traded to Tigre in February 2022 on loan for a year. The transaction was completed for an estimated fee of €450,000. Fernández played a total of 42 matches with that club. After the loan expired, Fernández returned to Boca Juniors in 2023.

=== Al-Qadsiah ===
In August 2024, he was transferred to Saudi Pro League club Al Qadsiah.

=== Bayer Leverkusen ===
On September 1, 2025, Fernández moved to Germany and signed with Bundesliga club Bayer Leverkusen. Later that month, on 13 September, he made his debut in a 3–1 victory over Eintracht Frankfurt, receiving a red card in the stoppage time.

== International career ==
Fernández was called up for the Argentina U17 then coached by Pablo Aimar to play the 2019 South American Championship in Peru, where the national side crowned champions. He also played for Argentina in the 2019 FIFA U-17 World Cup held in Brazil.

On 13 December 2023, Fernández made his debut for the Argentina U23 in 3–0 friendly match victory against Ecuador U23. Fernández was also a member of the Argentina national under-23 football team that played at the 2024 CONMEBOL Pre-Olympic Tournament and qualified for the 2024 Summer Olympics men's football tournament in France.

Fernández competed at the 2024 Summer Olympics. He was one of the key players of Argentina, where he scored a goal against Iraq.

On 30 September 2026, Fernández made his debut with the Argentina national team in a 4–0 friendly win against Bolivia.

== Career statistics ==
=== Club ===
As of match played 31 October 2026

Appearances and goals by club, season and competition
Club	Season	League			National cup (Note: Includes Copa Argentina, King's Cup)		League cup (Note: Includes Copa de la Liga)		Continental		Other		Total	
Club	Season	Division	Apps	Goals	Apps	Goals	Apps	Goals	Apps	Goals	Apps	Goals	Apps	Goals
Boca Juniors	2021	AFA Liga Profesional de Fútbol	2	0	—		1	0	—		—		3	0
Boca Juniors	2023	AFA Liga Profesional de Fútbol	19	0	5	0	10	0	8 (Note: Appearances in Copa Libertadores)	0	2 (Note: One appearance in Supercopa Argentina, one appearance in Supercopa Internacional)	0	44	0
Boca Juniors	2024	AFA Liga Profesional de Fútbol	5	2	2	0	8	0	5 (Note: Appearances in Copa Sudamericana)	0	0	0	20	2
Boca Juniors	Total		26	2	7	0	19	0	13	0	2	0	67	2
Tigre (loan)	2022	Argentine Primera División	25	0	1	0	15	0	—		1 (Note: Appearance in Trofeo de Campeones)	0	42	0
Al-Qadsiah	2024–25	Saudi Pro League	32	1	5	0	—		—		—		37	1
Bayer Leverkusen	2025–26	Bundesliga	20	0	1	0	—		9 (Note: Appearances in UEFA Champions League)	0	—		30	0
Bayer Leverkusen	2026–27	Bundesliga	8	1	2	0	—		3 (Note: Appearances in UEFA Europa League)	0	—		13	1
Bayer Leverkusen	Total		28	1	3	0	—		12	0	—		43	1
Career total			111	4	16	0	34	0	25	0	3	0	189	4

=== International ===
As of match played 1 October 2026

Appearances and goals by national team and year
National team	Year	Apps	Goals
Argentina	2026	1	0
Total		1	0

== Honours ==
Boca Juniors

- Supercopa Argentina: 2022

Argentina U17

- South American U-17 Championship: 2019
