= Christian Kofane =

Cameroonian footballer (born 2006)

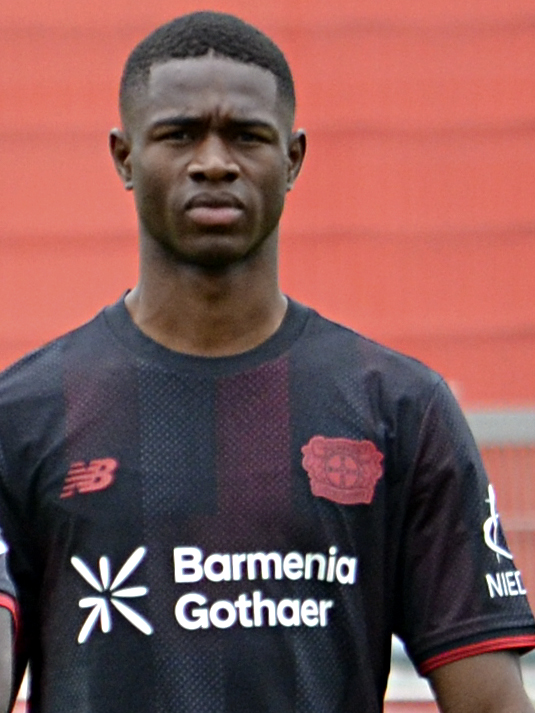
- Kofane with Bayer Leverkusen in 2025

Personal information
- Full name: Christian Michel Kofane
- Date of birth: 26 July 2006 (age 20)
- Place of birth: Douala, Cameroon
- Height: 1.89 m (6 ft 2 in)
- Position: Forward

Team information
- Current team: Bayer Leverkusen
- Number: 35

Youth career
- AS Vatican Sport Étude
- AS Nylon
- 2024–2025: Albacete

Senior career*
Years	Team	Apps	(Gls)
2025	Albacete	20	(8)
2025–	Bayer Leverkusen	33	(7)

International career^{‡}
2024–	Cameroon U20		
2025–	Cameroon	7	(2)
- * Club domestic league appearances and goals as of 20 September 2026 ‡ National team caps and goals as of 24 September 2026

Christian Michel Kofane (born 26 July 2006) is a Cameroonian professional footballer who plays as a forward for Bundesliga club Bayer Leverkusen and the Cameroon national team.

== Club career ==
=== Albacete ===
Born to Cameroonian parents, Kofane moved to France with his parents. Kofane holds dual Cameroonian-French citizenship. Kofane joined Albacete Balompié's youth sides in November 2024, after the club established a partnership with AS Nylon. After impressing with the Juvenil side by scoring six goals in six appearances, he was called up to train with the first team by manager Alberto González.

Kofane made his professional debut on 11 January 2025, starting and scoring the opener in a 2–2 Segunda División home draw against Racing de Santander. He finished the season with eight goals, attracting interest of several European clubs.

=== Bayer Leverkusen ===
On 11 July 2025, Albacete announced that Bayer 04 Leverkusen reached an agreement for the transfer of Kofane, paying a sum higher than his €5 million release clause. He signed a four-year contract with his new club. A month later, on 15 August, he recorded his first goal and assist in a 4–0 away win over Sonnenhof Großaspach in the DFB-Pokal. Later that year, on 1 October, he netted his first UEFA Champions League goal in a 1–1 draw with PSV Eindhoven. Hence, he became the club's youngest goalscorer in the European competition, aged 19 years and 67 days old. Three days later, he scored his first Bundesliga goal in a 2–0 win over Union Berlin.

== International career ==
In September 2024, Kofane played unofficial friendly matches with the Cameroon national under-20 team. He received another call-up to the side in May 2025.

On December 1, 2025, he was called up for the first time to the Cameroon national team by David Pagou to compete in the 2025 Africa Cup of Nations.

== Career statistics ==
=== Club ===
As of match played 20 September 2026

Appearances and goals by club, season and competition
Club	Season	League			National cup (Note: Includes DFB-Pokal)		Europe		Total	
Club	Season	Division	Apps	Goals	Apps	Goals	Apps	Goals	Apps	Goals
Albacete	2024–25	Segunda División	20	8	0	0	—		20	8
Bayer Leverkusen	2025–26	Bundesliga	29	5	4	1	11 (Note: Appearances in UEFA Champions League)	1	44	7
Bayer Leverkusen	2026–27	Bundesliga	4	2	1	1	1 (Note: Appearances in UEFA Europa League)	0	6	3
Bayer Leverkusen	Total		33	7	5	2	12	1	50	10
Career total			53	15	5	2	12	1	70	18

=== International ===
As of match played 24 September 2026

Appearances and goals by national team and year
National team	Year	Apps	Goals
Cameroon	2025	2	1
Cameroon	2026	5	1
Total		7	2

As of match played 4 January 2026
Cameroon score listed first, score column indicates score after each Kofane goal.

List of international goals scored by Christian Kofane
No.	Date	Venue	Opponent	Score	Result	Competition
1	31 December 2025	Adrar Stadium, Agadir, Morocco	Mozambique	2–1	2–1	2025 Africa Cup of Nations
2	4 January 2026	Al Medina Stadium, Rabat, Morocco	South Africa	2–0	2–1	2025 Africa Cup of Nations
