= Edmond Tapsoba =

Burkinabé footballer (born 1999)

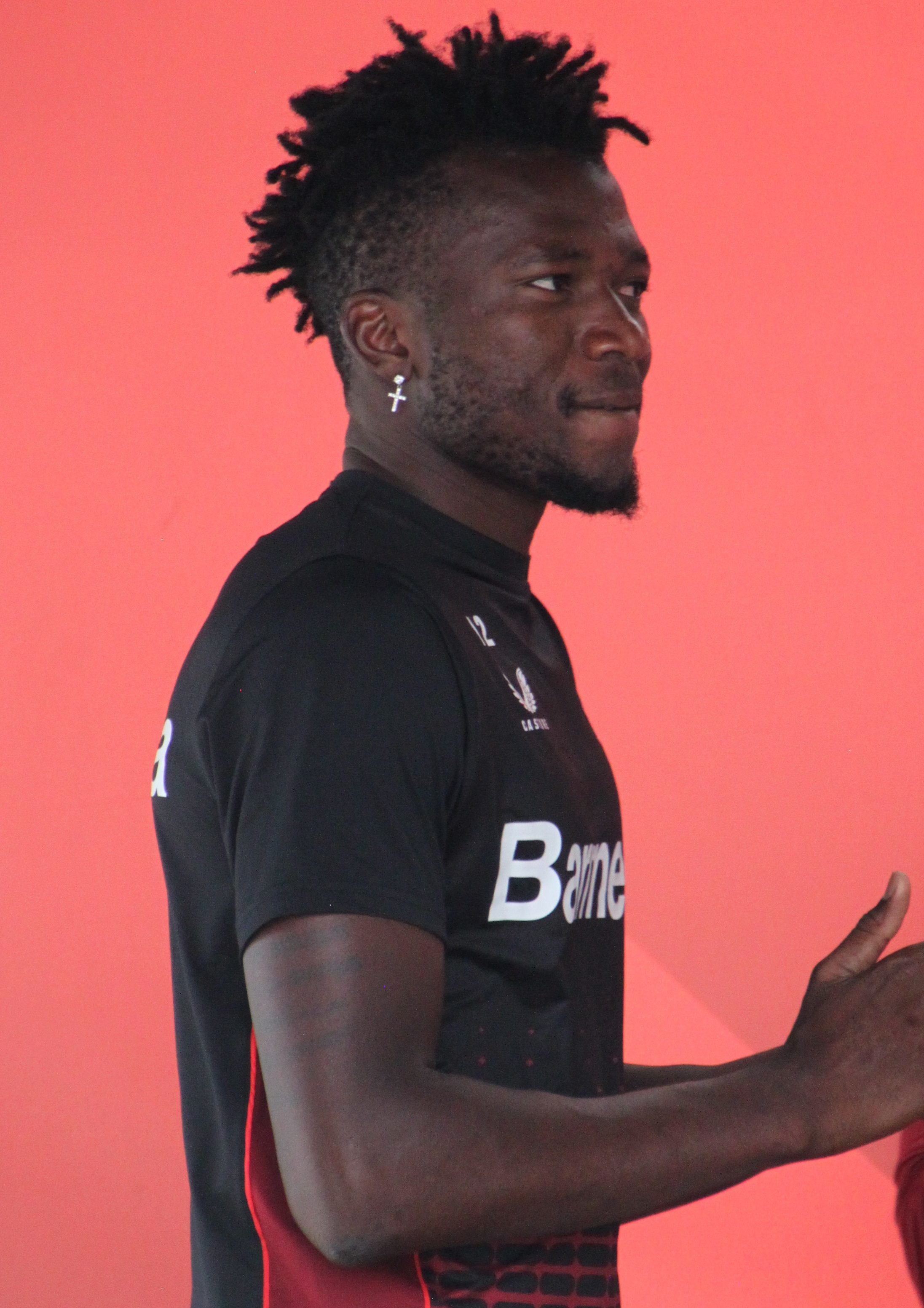
- Tapsoba with Bayer Leverkusen in 2022

Personal information
- Full name: Edmond Fayçal Tapsoba
- Date of birth: 2 February 1999 (age 27)
- Place of birth: Ouagadougou, Burkina Faso
- Height: 1.92 m (6 ft 4 in)
- Position: Centre-back

Team information
- Current team: Bayer Leverkusen
- Number: 12

Senior career*
Years	Team	Apps	(Gls)
2014–2015	Salitas		
2015–2017	US Ouagadougou		
2017–2018	Leixões	0	(0)
2018–2020	Vitória de Guimarães B	30	(7)
2019–2020	Vitória de Guimarães	16	(4)
2020–	Bayer Leverkusen	195	(8)

International career^{‡}
2016–	Burkina Faso	67	(4)
- * Club domestic league appearances and goals as of 17:30, 31 October 2026 (UTC) ‡ National team caps and goals as of 23:01, 28 September 2026 (UTC)

Edmond Fayçal Tapsoba (born 2 February 1999) is a Burkinabé professional footballer who plays as a centre-back for Bundesliga club Bayer Leverkusen, which he captains, and the Burkina Faso national team.

== Early and personal life ==
Tapsoba grew up in the Karpala section of Ouagadougou where he played football in the streets, but he never played organized football until the age of fourteen. As a child, he would often skip school to play football. He is represented by former Portugal international Deco. Tapsoba can speak some English, as well as French. During the COVID-19 pandemic, he donated masks, gloves, and hand sanitiser to a market in Ouagadougou.

== Club career ==
=== Early career ===
Tapsoba previously played for Salitas, US Ouagadougou, Leixões, Vitória de Guimarães B, and Vitória de Guimarães.

=== Bayer Leverkusen ===
On 31 January 2020, Tapsoba agreed to a five-and-a-half-year contract with German Bundesliga side Bayer Leverkusen for a fee of €18 million plus €7 million for additional objectives. On 21 February 2021, he scored his first Bundesliga goal for Bayer Leverkusen in the final seconds of stoppage time in a match against FC Augsburg, equalising for his side and extending Leverkusen's unbeaten streak against Augsburg to twenty matches.

Tapsoba was a member of the Leverkusen side that won the 2023–24 Bundesliga title undefeated.

Ahead of the 2026–27 season, Leverkusen head coach Carles Martínez Novell named Tapsoba as the club's new captain, succeeding Robert Andrich.

== International career ==
Tapsoba made his senior international debut for Burkina Faso in 2016.

In December 2021, he was selected to represent his country at the 2021 Africa Cup of Nations in Cameroon. Burkina Faso would reach the semi-finals of the tournament and Tapsoba was named in the best eleven along with teammate Blati Touré.

On 20 December 2023, Tapsoba was included in the final 27-man squad for the 2023 Africa Cup of Nations.

Tapsoba also represented Burkina Faso at the 2025 AFCON, scoring his first AFCON goal on 24 December 2025 against Equatorial Guinea in his 27th appearance in the competition.

== Style of play ==
Tapsoba has been compared to former Bayern Munich and Germany centre-back Jérôme Boateng for his speed, strength, passing ability, and composure. He is also known for his ability to score goals, especially from the penalty spot. He cites players such as John Stones, Per Mertesacker, and Virgil van Dijk as inspirations.

== Career statistics ==
=== Club ===
As of match played 31 October 2026

Appearances and goals by club, season and competition
Club	Season	League			National cup (Note: Includes Taça de Portugal, DFB-Pokal)		League cup (Note: Includes Taça da Liga)		Continental		Other		Total	
Club	Season	Division	Apps	Goals	Apps	Goals	Apps	Goals	Apps	Goals	Apps	Goals	Apps	Goals
Vitória de Guimarães B	2018–19	LigaPro	30	7	—		—		—		—		30	7
Vitória de Guimarães	2019–20	Primeira Liga	16	4	1	0	4	1	11 (Note: Appearances in UEFA Europa League)	3	—		32	8
Bayer Leverkusen	2019–20	Bundesliga	14	0	3	0	—		5	0	—		22	0
Bayer Leverkusen	2020–21	Bundesliga	31	1	3	1	—		5	0	—		39	2
Bayer Leverkusen	2021–22	Bundesliga	22	1	1	0	—		6	0	—		29	1
Bayer Leverkusen	2022–23	Bundesliga	33	1	1	0	—		13 (Note: Five appearances in UEFA Champions League, eight appearances and one goal in UEFA Europa League)	1	—		47	2
Bayer Leverkusen	2023–24	Bundesliga	28	0	6	1	—		12	2	—		46	3
Bayer Leverkusen	2024–25	Bundesliga	29	0	4	0	—		9 (Note: Appearances in UEFA Champions League)	0	1 (Note: Appearance in DFL-Supercup)	0	43	0
Bayer Leverkusen	2025–26	Bundesliga	29	5	4	0	—		10	0	—		43	5
Bayer Leverkusen	2026–27	Bundesliga	8	0	2	2	—		3	0	—		13	2
Bayer Leverkusen	Total		195	8	23	4	—		63	3	1	0	282	15
Career total			241	19	24	4	4	1	74	6	1	0	326	30

=== International ===
As of match played 28 September 2026

Appearances and goals by national team and year
National team	Year	Apps	Goals
Burkina Faso	2016	1	0
Burkina Faso	2017	2	0
Burkina Faso	2018	0	0
Burkina Faso	2019	5	0
Burkina Faso	2020	4	0
Burkina Faso	2021	7	0
Burkina Faso	2022	14	1
Burkina Faso	2023	5	0
Burkina Faso	2024	13	0
Burkina Faso	2025	10	3
Burkina Faso	2026	6	0
Total		67	4

Scores and results list Burkina Faso's goal tally first, score column indicates score after each Tapsoba goal.

List of international goals scored by Edmond Tapsoba
No.	Date	Venue	Opponent	Score	Result	Competition
1	19 November 2022	Marrakesh Stadium, Marrakesh, Morocco	Ivory Coast	2–1	2–1	Friendly
2	5 September 2025	Estádio 24 de Setembro, Bissau, Guinea-Bissau	Djibouti	3–0	6–0	2026 FIFA World Cup qualification
3	5 September 2025	Estádio 24 de Setembro, Bissau, Guinea-Bissau	Djibouti	4–0	6–0	2026 FIFA World Cup qualification
4	24 December 2025	Stade Mohammed V, Casablanca, Morocco	Equatorial Guinea	2–1	2–1	2025 Africa Cup of Nations

== Honours ==
Bayer Leverkusen

- Bundesliga: 2023–24
- DFB-Pokal: 2023–24
- DFL-Supercup: 2024

Individual

- Africa Cup of Nations Team of the Tournament: 2021
