= Aleix García =

Spanish footballer (born 1997)

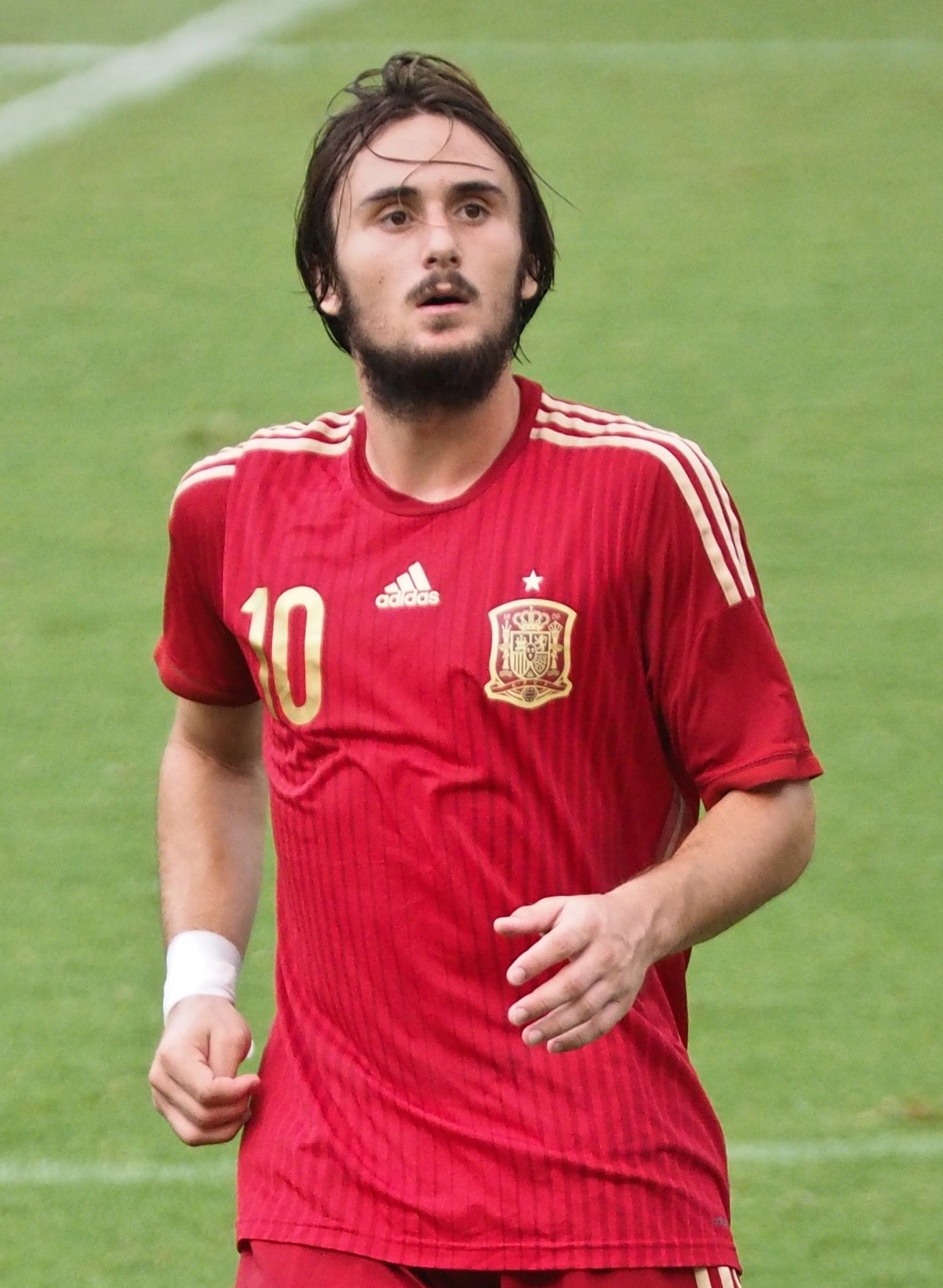
- García with Spain U18 in 2015

Personal information
- Full name: Aleix García Serrano
- Date of birth: 28 June 1997 (age 29)
- Place of birth: Ulldecona, Spain
- Height: 1.73 m (5 ft 8 in)
- Position: Central midfielder

Team information
- Current team: Bayer Leverkusen
- Number: 24

Youth career
- 2002–2005: Ulldecona
- 2005–2015: Villarreal
- 2015–2016: Manchester City

Senior career*
Years	Team	Apps	(Gls)
2015	Villarreal	1	(0)
2015–2020	Manchester City	4	(0)
2017–2019	→ Girona (loan)	51	(3)
2019–2020	→ Mouscron (loan)	23	(5)
2020–2021	Dinamo București	8	(0)
2021	Eibar	11	(0)
2021–2024	Girona	98	(4)
2024–	Bayer Leverkusen	69	(6)

International career^{‡}
2013	Spain U16	2	(0)
2013–2014	Spain U17	9	(1)
2015	Spain U18	2	(2)
2016	Spain U19	1	(0)
2018	Spain U21	1	(0)
2023–	Spain	8	(0)
2019–	Catalonia	2	(0)
- * Club domestic league appearances and goals as of 31 October 2026 ‡ National team caps and goals as of 18 November 2025

Aleix García Serrano (Catalan: [əˈleʒ ɣəɾˈsi.ə]; Spanish: [aˈleʃ ɣaɾˈθi.a]; (Note: In isolation, García is pronounced [ɡəɾˈsi.ə]/[ɡaɾˈθi.a], and Aleix [əˈleʃ].) born 28 June 1997) is a Spanish professional footballer who plays as a central midfielder for Bundesliga club Bayer Leverkusen and the Spain national team.

== Club career ==
=== Villarreal ===
Born in Ulldecona, Tarragona, Catalonia, García joined Villarreal's youth setup in 2005, aged eight, after starting out at CF Ulldecona. He made his senior debut with the reserves in Segunda División B on 26 April 2014 at only 16 years of age, coming on as a late substitute in a 1–0 away win against CF Badalona.

García featured for the C team in the 2014–15 season, also appearing for the B side in the same campaign. He made his first team – and La Liga – debut on 23 May 2015, replacing Antonio Rukavina in a 4–0 loss at Athletic Bilbao.

=== Manchester City ===
On 27 August 2015, García joined Premier League side Manchester City. He was selected by then-City manager Manuel Pellegrini against Chelsea on 21 February 2016 in the fifth round of the FA Cup.

García made his first Premier League appearance on 17 September 2016, coming on as a 75th-minute substitute in a 4–0 home win against Bournemouth. On 21 September, he started in an EFL Cup match against Swansea City, scoring his first goal for the club in the 2–1 away win. He next started a month later on 26 October, in another EFL Cup match, a 1–0 loss to Manchester United.

==== Girona (loan) ====
On 1 August 2017, García was loaned to newly promoted La Liga club Girona FC until the end of the season. He was loaned again for the 2018–19 season.

==== Royal Excel Mouscron (loan) ====
García was loaned to Belgian side Royal Excel Mouscron for the 2019–20 season.

=== Dinamo București & Eibar ===
On 8 October 2020, he signed a contract with Romanian club Dinamo București, until the end of the season. On 18 January 2021, after featuring sparingly, he returned to Spain and its top tier after signing for Eibar on a free transfer.

=== Return to Girona ===
On 23 July 2021, García returned to Girona on a two-year contract, with the club now in Segunda División. He made his return debut for the club on 14 August, the first matchday of the 2021–22 season, starting in a 2–0 victory against Amorebieta. On 2 December 2021, García scored his first goal for the club upon returning, closing the score in a 5–1 away win in the Copa del Rey over fourth tier Calvo Sotelo Puertollano. He made 45 total appearances for the club in his first season, helping the club reach promotion to La Liga in the play-offs.

On 26 February 2023, García opened the scoring in a historic 3–2 win over Athletic Bilbao, Girona's first ever win away against Athletic at San Mamés.

=== Bayer Leverkusen ===
On 13 June 2024, after a successful season for Girona, Garcia moved to Bayer Leverkusen for more than €18 million.

== International career ==
García was a youth international footballer for Spain. On 10 November 2023, he was called up for the senior national team for the upcoming UEFA Euro 2024 qualifying matches. On 16 November, he made his debut in a 3–1 away win over Cyprus.

On 27 May 2024, he was selected in the 29-man preliminary squad for the UEFA Euro 2024. However, on 7 June, he was excluded from the final squad prior to the tournament.

== Career statistics ==
=== Club ===
As of match played 31 October 2026

Appearances and goals by club, season and competition
Club	Season	League			National cup (Note: Includes FA Cup, Copa del Rey, Belgian Cup, Cupa României, DFB-Pokal)		League cup (Note: Includes EFL Cup)		Europe		Other		Total	
Club	Season	Division	Apps	Goals	Apps	Goals	Apps	Goals	Apps	Goals	Apps	Goals	Apps	Goals
Villarreal B	2013–14	Segunda División B	3	0	—		—		—		—		3	0
Villarreal B	2014–15	Segunda División B	7	0	—		—		—		—		7	4
Villarreal B	Total		10	0	—		—		—		—		10	0
Villarreal C	2014–15	Tercera División	27	4	—		—		—		—		27	4
Villarreal	2014–15	La Liga	1	0	0	0	—		0	0	—		1	0
Manchester City	2015–16	Premier League	0	0	1	0	0	0	0	0	—		1	0
Manchester City	2016–17	Premier League	4	0	2	0	2	1	0	0	—		8	1
Manchester City	Total		4	0	3	0	2	1	0	0	—		9	1
Girona (loan)	2017–18	La Liga	20	1	1	0	—		—		—		21	1
Girona (loan)	2018–19	La Liga	31	2	3	0	—		—		—		34	2
Girona (loan)	Total		51	3	4	0	—		—		—		55	3
Mouscron (loan)	2019–20	Belgian Pro League	23	5	2	0	—		—		—		25	5
Dinamo București	2020–21	Liga I	7	0	1	0	—		—		—		8	0
Eibar	2020–21	La Liga	11	0	0	0	—		—		—		11	0
Girona	2021–22	Segunda División	38	0	3	1	—		—		4 (Note: Appearances in Segunda División play-offs)	0	45	1
Girona	2022–23	La Liga	30	1	2	0	—		—		—		32	1
Girona	2023–24	La Liga	37	3	3	0	—		—		—		40	3
Girona	Total		98	3	8	1	—		—		4	0	110	4
Bayer Leverkusen	2024–25	Bundesliga	28	3	3	1	—		10 (Note: Appearances in UEFA Champions League)	1	1 (Note: Appearance in Franz Beckenbauer Supercup)	0	42	5
Bayer Leverkusen	2025–26	Bundesliga	33	3	4	1	—		12	2	—		49	6
Bayer Leverkusen	2026–27	Bundesliga	8	0	2	0	—		3 (Note: Appearances in UEFA Europa League)	0	—		13	0
Bayer Leverkusen	Total		69	6	9	2	—		25	3	1	0	104	11
Career total			301	21	27	3	2	1	25	3	5	0	360	28

=== International ===
As of match played 18 November 2025

Appearances and goals by national team and year
National team	Year	Apps	Goals
Spain	2023	1	0
Spain	2024	3	0
Spain	2025	4	0
Total		8	0

== Honours ==
Bayer Leverkusen

- DFL-Supercup: 2024

Girona

- Supercopa de Catalunya: 2019

Individual

- La Liga Team of the Season: 2023–24
