= Jarell Quansah =

English footballer (born 2003)

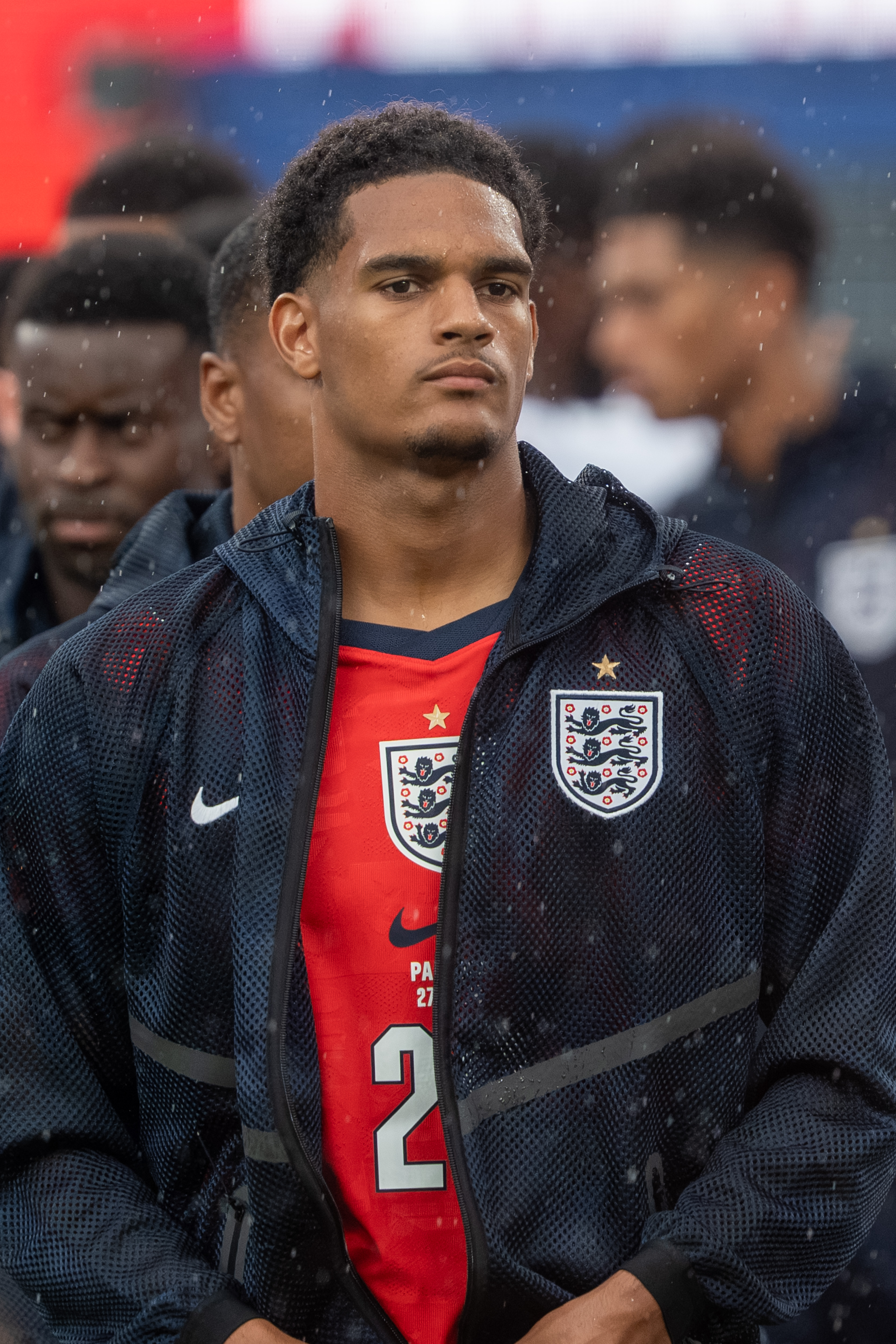
- Quansah with England in 2026

Personal information
- Full name: Jarell Amorin Quansah
- Date of birth: 29 January 2003 (age 23)
- Place of birth: Warrington, England
- Height: 6 ft 3 in (1.90 m)
- Position: Centre-back

Team information
- Current team: Bayer Leverkusen
- Number: 4

Youth career
- 2008–2023: Liverpool

Senior career*
| Years | Team | Apps | (Gls) |
| 2023–2025 | Liverpool | 30 | (2) |
| 2023 | → Bristol Rovers (loan) | 16 | (0) |
| 2025– | Bayer Leverkusen | 36 | (5) |

International career^{‡}
| 2018–2019 | England U16 | 3 | (1) |
| 2019–2020 | England U17 | 3 | (0) |
| 2021 | England U18 | 1 | (0) |
| 2021–2022 | England U19 | 8 | (2) |
| 2023 | England U20 | 7 | (1) |
| 2023–2025 | England U21 | 14 | (0) |
| 2025– | England | 11 | (0) |
Medal record
Men's football
Representing England
FIFA World Cup
| Third place | 2026 Canada–Mexico–US |
UEFA European Under-21 Championship
| Winner | 2025 Slovakia |
UEFA European Under-19 Championship
| Winner | 2022 Slovakia |
- * Club domestic league appearances and goals as of 17:30, 31 October 2026 ‡ National team caps and goals as of 21:50, 15 November 2026 (UTC)

Jarell Amorin Quansah (born 29 January 2003) is an English professional footballer who plays as a centre-back for Bundesliga club Bayer Leverkusen and the England national team.

== Early life ==
Quansah joined Liverpool at the age of six, from Woolston Rovers, in his native Warrington. He is of Ghanaian descent through his father. His grandfather Samuel played for Ghana before emigrating to England in the late 1950s.

== Club career ==
=== Liverpool ===
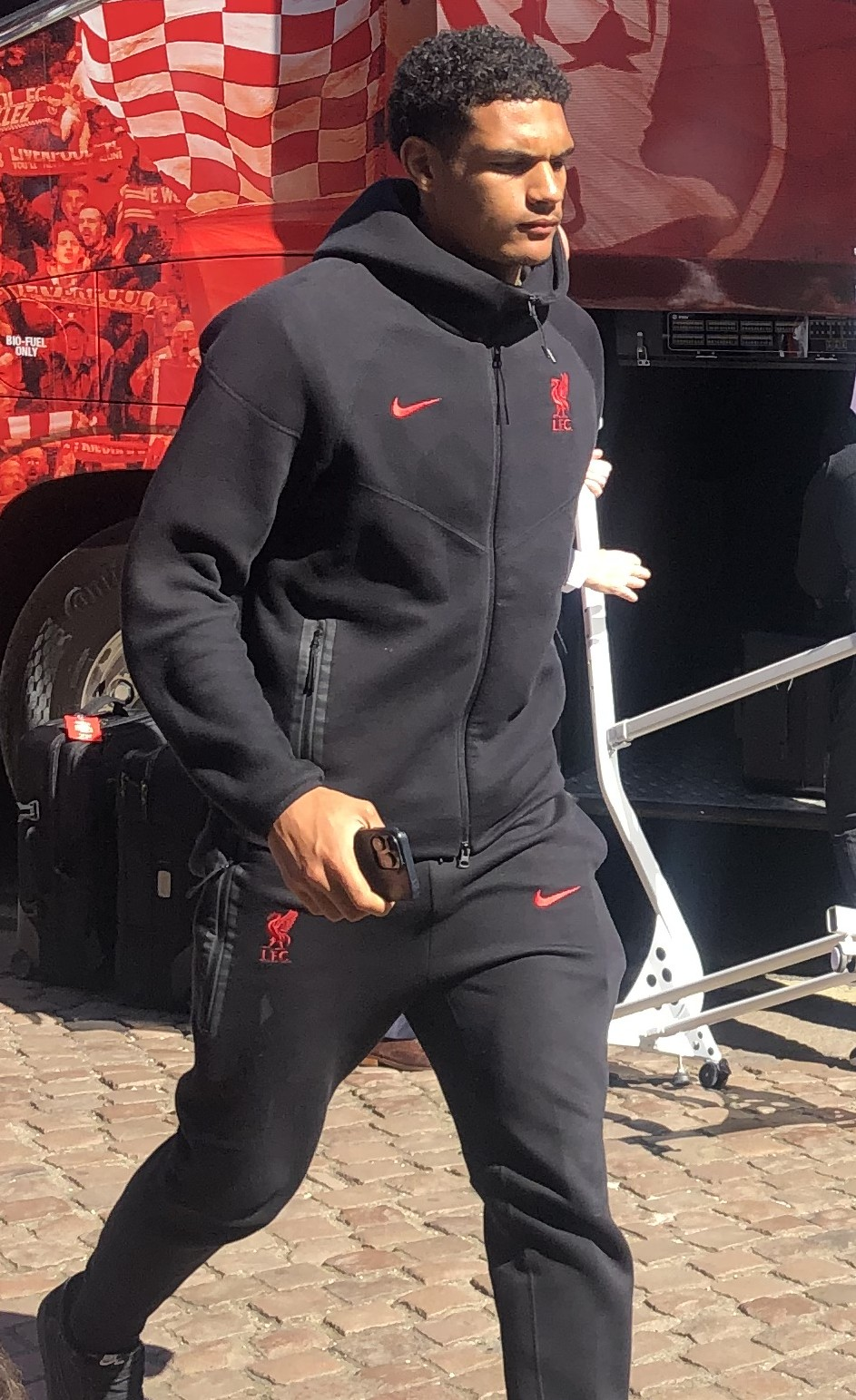
Quansah with Liverpool in 2025

Quansah signed his second contract with the Premier league giants 4 February 2021. During this 2020–21 season, he captained the Liverpool under-18 side that made it to the FA Youth Cup final, along with the likes of Billy Koumetio, Melkamu Frauendorf, Max Woltman, Conor Bradley and Luke Chambers.

The next season, Quansah captained the UEFA Youth League team, whilst also playing in the Premier League 2 with the reserves, and playing a key role with the latter during the Lancashire Senior Cup victory.

Quansah then made his first appearance on the team sheet with the senior team, in the Premier League and EFL Cup, not coming off the bench however as Liverpool won both domestic cups, finishing just two victories short from a historic quadruple.

On 20 January 2023, Quansah joined League One club Bristol Rovers on loan until the end of the season. He made his senior debut on 28 January, playing the duration of a 5–1 defeat to Morecambe, impressing despite the result. Following an impressive performance in a 0–0 draw with Ipswich Town, Rovers' manager Joey Barton predicted Quansah to be destined for the top level of the game, citing his ability on the ball as a key asset. On 18 March, he received a first career sending-off for violent conduct in the last minutes of a 2–0 home defeat to Portsmouth.

On 27 August 2023, Quansah made his professional debut for Liverpool, coming on as a substitute for Joël Matip in a 2–1 win over Newcastle United in the Premier League. On 14 December, Quansah scored his first goal for Liverpool against Union Saint-Gilloise in the UEFA Europa league in a 2–1 defeat.

On 25 February 2024, Liverpool played in the 2024 EFL Cup final against Chelsea at Wembley Stadium. During extra time, in the 106th minute of the game, Quansah was substituted on for Ibrahima Konaté. Liverpool went on to win the match 1–0 after extra time, earning Quansah his first trophy with the club. Later that year, on 13 May, he scored his first Premier League goal in a 3–3 away draw against Aston Villa, and then scored for a second successive game against Wolverhampton Wanderers in Jürgen Klopp's last game in charge of the club on 19 May 2024. On 7 October 2024, he signed a new long-term contract with Liverpool.

On 27 April 2025, Liverpool won the 2024–25 Premier League, after a 5–1 win against Tottenham Hotspur earning Quansah his second trophy at the club.

=== Bayer Leverkusen ===
On 2 July 2025, Quansah signed for Bundesliga side Bayer Leverkusen on a five-year deal for an initial fee of £30 million, with an additional £5 million in add-ons. On 23 August, he scored his first goal on his Bundesliga debut in a 2–1 home defeat against Hoffenheim; after scoring his first goal for Leverkusen, he did his former Liverpool teammate Diogo Jota's celebration as a tribute to him.

== International career ==
Quansah with England at the 2026 FIFA World Cup

Eligible to play for England as well as Scotland, Ghana, and Barbados through his grandparents, Jarell Quansah first played with England youth teams, from under-16s level to the under-19s.

In June 2022, Quansah was included in the England squad for the 2022 Under-19 Euros. Starting all games as a centre-back during the competition in Slovakia, he played a key role in England's successful campaign. Most notably he scored the winner in the 2–1 semi-final victory against Italy. On 1 July 2022, Quansah started in the final and provided an assist for Callum Doyle to score the equaliser as England went on to defeat Israel 3–1 in extra time to win the tournament. His performances during the competition led to his inclusion in the UEFA team of the tournament.

Quansah made his England U20 debut during a 2–0 win over Germany in Manchester on 22 March 2023. On 10 May 2023, Quansah was included in the England squad for the 2023 FIFA U-20 World Cup. He started all four of their games at the tournament including the round of sixteen elimination against Italy.

Quansah made his debut for the England U21s on 12 October 2023, coming on as a substitute in a 9–1 win against Serbia U21s. A year later he captained England in their last qualifier against Azerbaijan at Ashton Gate.

On 21 May 2024, Quansah was announced as a provisional member of the expanded 33-member England squad for UEFA Euro 2024, his first call-up to the senior team. On 6 June 2024, England manager Gareth Southgate left Quansah out of the final 26-man squad.

On 14 March 2025, Quansah was included in Thomas Tuchel's first England squad, for World Cup qualifying matches against Albania and Latvia.

Quansah was included in the England squad for the 2025 UEFA European Under-21 Championship. He played every minute of their tournament including the final on 28 June as England defeated Germany 3–2 after extra time to lift the trophy.

On 16 November 2025, Quansah made his senior debut for England in a 2–0 away win over Albania in the 2026 FIFA World Cup qualification.

On 22 May 2026, Quansah was selected to play in the 2026 FIFA World Cup. He started in the third group stage match against Panama following an injury to Reece James, but was himself substituted due to an injury during the match. In the second half of the round-of-16 match against Mexico on 5 July, Quansah performed a risky slide tackle on defender Jesús Gallardo. Despite play resuming, referee Alireza Faghani issued a red card to Quansah after a VAR check, for "violent conduct". England went on to win the match 3–2, advancing to the quarterfinals.

== Style of play ==
Quansah is a right-footed centre-back who also regularly played right-back during his youth years. He has been described as a ball-playing defender, able to break the lines with his long passes, while staying calm and focused in defence, and strong and quick-thinking in aerial duels.

== Personal life ==
Quansah's brother, Keenan, is also a footballer, who plays for National League South club Slough Town.

== Career statistics ==
=== Club ===
As of match played 31 October 2026

Appearances and goals by club, season and competition
| Club | Season | League | | | National cup (Note: Includes FA Cup, DFB-Pokal) | | League cup (Note: Includes EFL Cup) | | Europe | | Other | | Total | |
| Club | Season | Division | Apps | Goals | Apps | Goals | Apps | Goals | Apps | Goals | Apps | Goals | Apps | Goals |
|---|---|---|---|---|---|---|---|---|---|---|---|---|---|---|
| Liverpool U21 | 2021–22 | — | | | — | | — | | — | | 2 (Note: Appearances in EFL Trophy) | 0 | 2 | 0 |
| Liverpool U21 | 2022–23 | — | | | — | | — | | — | | 2 | 0 | 2 | 0 |
| Liverpool U21 | Total | | — | | — | | — | | — | | 4 | 0 | 4 | 0 |
| Bristol Rovers (loan) | 2022–23 | League One | 16 | 0 | — | | — | | — | | — | | 16 | 0 |
| Liverpool | 2023–24 | Premier League | 17 | 2 | 4 | 0 | 5 | 0 | 7 (Note: Appearances in UEFA Europa League) | 1 | — | | 33 | 3 |
| Liverpool | 2024–25 | Premier League | 13 | 0 | 2 | 0 | 6 | 0 | 4 (Note: Appearances in UEFA Champions League) | 0 | — | | 25 | 0 |
| Liverpool | Total | | 30 | 2 | 6 | 0 | 11 | 0 | 11 | 1 | — | | 58 | 3 |
| Bayer Leverkusen | 2025–26 | Bundesliga | 28 | 4 | 4 | 1 | — | | 11 | 0 | — | | 43 | 5 |
| Bayer Leverkusen | 2026–27 | Bundesliga | 8 | 1 | 2 | 0 | — | | 2 | 0 | — | | 12 | 1 |
| Bayer Leverkusen | Total | | 36 | 5 | 6 | 1 | — | | 13 | 0 | — | | 55 | 6 |
| Career total | | | 82 | 6 | 12 | 1 | 11 | 0 | 24 | 1 | 4 | 0 | 133 | 9 |

=== International ===
As of match played 15 November 2026

Appearances and goals by national team and year
| National team | Year | Apps | Goals |
|---|---|---|---|
| England | 2025 | 1 | 0 |
| England | 2026 | 10 | 0 |
| Total | | 11 | 0 |

== Honours ==
Liverpool

- Premier League: 2024–25
- EFL Cup: 2023–24; runner-up: 2024–25

England U19

- UEFA European Under-19 Championship: 2022

England U21

- UEFA European Under-21 Championship: 2025

England

- FIFA World Cup third place: 2026

Individual

- UEFA European Under-19 Championship Team of the Tournament: 2022
