= Montrell Culbreath =

German footballer (born 2007)

Personal information
- Full name: Montrell Amare Culbreath
- Date of birth: 29 August 2007 (age 19)
- Place of birth: Landstuhl, Germany
- Height: 1.72 m (5 ft 8 in)
- Position: Right wing-back

Team information
- Current team: Bayer Leverkusen
- Number: 42

Youth career
- –2016: SV Spesbach
- 2016–2023: 1. FC Kaiserslautern
- 2023–: Bayer Leverkusen

Senior career*
Years	Team	Apps	(Gls)
2025–	Bayer Leverkusen	12	(1)

International career^{‡}
2022	Germany U16	6	(1)
2022	United States U16	3	(2)
2023–2024	Germany U17	12	(3)
2024–2025	Germany U18	7	(1)
2025–	Germany U19	15	(3)
Medal record
Men's football
Representing Germany
UEFA European Under-19 Championship
Runner-up	2026 Wales
- * Club domestic league appearances and goals as of 16 May 2026 ‡ National team caps and goals as of 12 July 2026

Montrell Amare Culbreath (born 29 August 2007) is a German professional footballer who plays as a right wing-back for Bundesliga club Bayer Leverkusen.

== Club career ==
As a youth player, Culbreath joined the youth academy of SV Spesbach. Following his stint there, he joined the youth academy of 1. FC Kaiserslautern in 2016.

Ahead of the 2023–24 season, he joined the youth academy of Bundesliga side Bayer Leverkusen. On 20 December 2025, he made his senior debut, scoring a stoppage-time goal in a 3–1 away win over RB Leipzig.

On 29 January 2026, Culbreath extended his contract with Bayer Leverkusen to 30 June 2030.

== International career ==
Culbreath was born in Germany to an American father and German mother, and holds dual citizenship. He is a Germany and United States youth international. During October 2025, he played for the Germany national under-19 team for 2026 UEFA European Under-19 Championship qualification.

== Career statistics ==
As of match played 16 May 2026

Appearances and goals by club, season and competition
Club	Season	League			DFB-Pokal		Europe		Other		Total	
Club	Season	Division	Apps	Goals	Apps	Goals	Apps	Goals	Apps	Goals	Apps	Goals
Bayer Leverkusen	2025–26	Bundesliga	12	1	1	0	3 (Note: Appearances in UEFA Champions League)	0	—		16	1
Career total			12	1	1	0	3	0	0	0	16	1

== Honours ==
Germany U19

- UEFA European Under-19 Championship runner-up: 2026
