= Kennet Eichhorn =

German footballer (born 2009)

Personal information
- Date of birth: 27 July 2009 (age 17)
- Place of birth: Bernau bei Berlin, Germany
- Height: 1.86 m (6 ft 1 in)
- Position: Defensive midfielder

Team information
- Current team: Bayer Leverkusen
- Number: 18

Youth career
- 2017–2025: Hertha BSC

Senior career*
Years	Team	Apps	(Gls)
2025–2026	Hertha BSC	17	(1)
2026–	Bayer Leverkusen	0	(0)

International career^{‡}
2024	Germany U16	2	(0)
2025–	Germany U17	4	(2)
- * Club domestic league appearances and goals as of 19:57, 18 May 2026 (UTC) ‡ National team caps and goals as of 22:01, 11 October 2025 (UTC)

Kennet Eichhorn (German pronunciation: [ˈkɛnɛt ˈaɪ̯çhɔʁn]; born 27 July 2009) is a German professional footballer who plays as a defensive midfielder for Bundesliga club Bayer Leverkusen.

== Club career ==
A youth product of Hertha BSC since he was a U9 in 2017, Eichhorn signed his first professional contract with the club on 4 July 2025. On 10 August 2025, he made his senior and professional debut with Hertha in a goalless 2. Bundesliga tie with Karlsruher SC. At 16 years and 14 days old, he became the youngest ever debutant in the 2. Bundesliga taking the record from Efe-Kaan Sihlaroglu. Later that year, on 2 December, he scored his first goal for the club in a 6–1 win over Kaiserslautern in the DFB-Pokal, at 16 years and 128 days old, becoming the youngest scorer in the competition's history and surpassing Jude Bellingham's previous record, and also the youngest scorer in Hertha's history, breaking Ibrahim Maza's record. On 10 May 2026, Eichhorn scored his first 2. Bundesliga goal in a 2–1 win over Greuther Fürth, becoming the youngest player, aged 16 years and 287 days, to score in the league, surpassing the previous record set by Gunther Reeg in 1985.

On 10 June 2026, Eichhorn signed with Bundesliga club Bayer Leverkusen until 2031, after the club activated a release clause in his contract with Hertha BSC reportedly worth just under €10 million.

== International career ==
Eichhorn is a youth international for Germany, having played up to the Germany U17s.

== Playing style ==
Scouted describes Eichhorn as playing with the steadiness and composure of a much older player. Rather than relying on flair and trickery, he uses his physicality to protect the ball and run into space.

Eichhorn is described as having an elegance and composure on the ball that has already started to draw comparisons to Toni Kroos.

He has previously stated his idols as Kevin De Bruyne, Sergio Busquets and Toni Kroos.

== Career statistics ==
As of match played 17 May 2026

Appearances and goals by club, season and competition
Club	Season	League			DFB-Pokal		Other		Total	
Club	Season	Division	Apps	Goals	Apps	Goals	Apps	Goals	Apps	Goals
Hertha BSC	2025–26	2. Bundesliga	17	1	2	1	—		19	2
Career total			17	1	2	1	—		19	2

== Honours ==
Individual

- Fritz Walter Medal: U17 Gold Medal 2026
