= Ernest Poku =

Dutch footballer (born 2004)

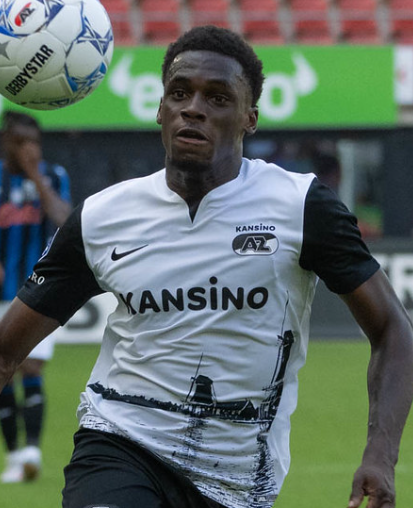
- Poku playing for AZ in 2024

Personal information
- Full name: Ernest Dillem Hais Poku
- Date of birth: 28 January 2004 (age 22)
- Place of birth: Hamburg, Germany
- Height: 1.72 m (5 ft 8 in)
- Positions: Winger; wing-back

Team information
- Current team: Beşiktaş (on loan from Bayer Leverkusen)
- Number: 17

Youth career
- –2019: FC Amsterdam
- 2019–2021: AZ

Senior career*
Years	Team	Apps	(Gls)
2021–2024	Jong AZ	54	(15)
2021–2025	AZ	50	(3)
2025–	Bayer Leverkusen	29	(5)
2026–	→ Beşiktaş (loan)	6	(1)

International career^{‡}
2020	Netherlands U16	2	(0)
2021	Netherlands U18	3	(2)
2022	Netherlands U19	6	(1)
2023–	Netherlands U21	25	(6)
- * Club domestic league appearances and goals as of 22:28, 22 November 2026 (UTC) ‡ National team caps and goals as of 22:12, 13 November 2026 (UTC)

Ernest Poku (born 28 January 2004) is a Dutch professional footballer who plays as a winger for Süper Lig club Beşiktaş, on loan from Bundesliga club Bayer Leverkusen. Born in Germany, he represents the Netherlands at the youth level.

== Club career ==
=== AZ ===
He started his young career at FC Amsterdam prior to joining the youth academy at AZ in the summer of 2019. He signed his first professional contract with AZ in February 2020, with the contract valid until mid-2023. On 30 April 2021, he made his debut for Jong AZ as a substitute in a 1–0 win over Roda JC. He trained with the club's first team during the pre-season for the 2021–22 season, and made his debut for AZ as a substitute in a 1–0 defeat to RKC Waalwijk in the opening match of the season on 14 August 2021.

On 28 January 2022, after a contract extension, he was promoted from Jong AZ to the first team of AZ. He scored his first goal in the Eredivisie for AZ Alkmaar on 28 April 2024, the third goal in a 3–0 away against NEC Nijmegen. He made his debut in the UEFA Europa League in October 2024, appearing as a substitute in a 2–0 defeat away against Athletic Bilbao. He played in the final of the KNVB Cup as AZ lost to Go Ahead Eagles on penalties on 21 April 2025. The game had ended 1–1 in normal time after Go Ahead Eagles scored a 98th-minute equaliser.

=== Bayer Leverkusen ===
On 12 August 2025, German Bundesliga club Bayer Leverkusen announced the signing of Poku for a reported fee of €10 million with an additional €2 million in add-ons. He signed a five-year deal until June 2030.

==== Loan to Beşiktaş ====
On 27 August 2026, Poku joined Turkish Süper Lig club Beşiktaş on a loan with obligation to buy at the end of the season.

== International career ==
Born in Germany, Poku is of Ghanaian descent. He made two appearances for the Netherlands national under-16 team in 2020. In 2022 he was named in the Dutch U19 squad. He scored his first goal for the Dutch U19 side against Ukraine U19 in June 2022. He was later promoted into the Dutch U21 side.

== Career statistics ==
As of match played 9 May 2026

Appearances and goals by club, season and competition
Club	Season	League			National cup (Note: Includes KNVB Cup, DFB-Pokal)		Europe		Total	
Club	Season	Division	Apps	Goals	Apps	Goals	Apps	Goals	Apps	Goals
Jong AZ	2020–21	Eerste Divisie	3	0	—		—		3	0
Jong AZ	2021–22	Eerste Divisie	22	2	—		—		22	2
Jong AZ	2022–23	Eerste Divisie	15	2	—		—		15	2
Jong AZ	2023–24	Eerste Divisie	14	11	—		—		14	11
Jong AZ	Total		54	15	—		—		54	15
AZ	2021–22	Eredivisie	4	0	0	0	2 (Note: Appearances in UEFA Europa League)	0	6	0
AZ	2022–23	Eredivisie	0	0	0	0	0	0	0	0
AZ	2023–24	Eredivisie	20	1	2	1	6 (Note: Appearances in UEFA Europa Conference League)	0	28	2
AZ	2024–25	Eredivisie	25	2	4	0	10	0	39	2
AZ	2025–26	Eredivisie	1	0	0	0	3	1	4	1
AZ	Total		50	3	6	1	21	1	77	5
Bayer Leverkusen	2025–26	Bundesliga	29	5	3	0	12 (Note: Appearances in UEFA Champions League)	0	44	5
Career total			133	23	9	1	33	1	175	25
