= Axel Tape =

French footballer (born 2007)

Personal information
- Full name: Axel Tape-Kobrissa
- Date of birth: 10 August 2007 (age 19)
- Place of birth: Bondy, France
- Height: 1.80 m (5 ft 11 in)
- Positions: Centre-back; right wing-back

Team information
- Current team: Levante (on loan from Bayer Leverkusen)
- Number: 16

Youth career
- 2015–2020: FC Bobigny
- 2020–2025: Paris Saint-Germain

Senior career*
Years	Team	Apps	(Gls)
2025	Paris Saint-Germain	2	(0)
2025–	Bayer Leverkusen	6	(0)
2026–	→ Levante (loan)	0	(0)

International career^{‡}
2024	France U18	2	(0)
2025–	France U19	4	(1)
- * Club domestic league appearances and goals as of 17:30, 28 February 2026 (UTC) ‡ National team caps and goals as of 31 March 2026

Axel Tape-Kobrissa (born 10 August 2007) is a French professional footballer who plays as a centre-back or right wing-back for La Liga club Levante, on loan from Bundesliga club Bayer Leverkusen.

== Club career ==
=== Paris Saint-Germain ===
Born in Bondy, Axel Tape joined the Paris Saint-Germain Academy as a teenager, where he became a standout for David Suarez's under-19, both in the national competition and the Youth League.

He was first called to the first team by Luis Enrique in November 2024 as a cover in defence, as both Marquinhos, Nuno Mendes, Presnel Kimpembe and Naoufel El Hannach where ruled out for the Ligue 1 game against Toulouse. He was an unused substitute during the 3–0 home win against Toulouse on 22 November.

Tape made his debut with Paris Saint-Germain on 15 January 2025, playing 72 minutes in a 2024–25 Coupe de France game against National 3 (5th tier) side Espaly, as PSG won the game 4–2. On 3 May, he made his Ligue 1 debut, by starting in a 2–1 away defeat against Strasbourg.

=== Bayer Leverkusen ===
On 11 June 2025, Tape signed a long-term contract with German Bundesliga club Bayer Leverkusen.

==== Loan to Levante ====
On 31 August 2026, Tape joined Spanish La Liga side Levante on a season-long loan.

== International career ==
Born in France, Tape is of Ivorian descent. He is a youth international for France, first receiving a call with the under-18 in November 2024, when he made his debut during a 1–0 loss to Turkey.

== Style of play ==
Able to play either as a box-to-box midfielder or a central defender, Tape is described as an athletic player with activity and forward projection.

== Career statistics ==
As of match played 28 February 2026

Appearances and goals by club, season and competition
Club	Season	League			National cup (Note: Includes Coupe de France, DFB-Pokal)		Europe		Other		Total	
Club	Season	Division	Apps	Goals	Apps	Goals	Apps	Goals	Apps	Goals	Apps	Goals
Paris Saint-Germain	2024–25	Ligue 1	2	0	1	0	0	0	0	0	3	0
Bayer Leverkusen	2025–26	Bundesliga	6	0	1	0	1 (Note: Appearance in UEFA Champions League)	0	—		8	0
Career total			8	0	1	0	1	0	0	0	10	0

== Honours ==
Paris Saint-Germain U19

- Championnat National U19: 2023–24, 2024–25

Paris Saint-Germain

- Ligue 1: 2024–25
- Coupe de France: 2024–25
