= Alejo Sarco =

Argentine footballer (born 2006)

Personal information
- Full name: Alejo Uriel Sarco Castro
- Date of birth: 6 January 2006 (age 20)
- Place of birth: Alberti, Argentina
- Height: 1.79 m (5 ft 10 in)
- Position: Forward

Team information
- Current team: Sporting Gijón

Youth career
- 2019–2022: Vélez Sarsfield

Senior career*
Years	Team	Apps	(Gls)
2022–2024	Vélez Sarsfield II	23	(12)
2024–2025	Vélez Sarsfield	8	(1)
2025–2026	Bayer Leverkusen	3	(0)
2026	→ Borussia Mönchengladbach (loan)	3	(0)
2026	→ Borussia Mönchengladbach II (loan)	5	(2)
2026–	Sporting Gijón	0	(0)

International career^{‡}
2022–2023	Argentina U17	20	(6)
2024–	Argentina U20	7	(4)
Medal record
Men's football
Representing Argentina
FIFA U-20 World Cup
Runner-up	2025 Chile
- * Club domestic league appearances and goals as of 9 May 2026 ‡ National team caps and goals as of 20 October 2025

Alejo Uriel Sarco Castro (born 6 January 2006) is an Argentine professional footballer who plays as a forward for Segunda División club Sporting Gijón.

== Club career ==
A youth product of Vélez Sarsfield since 2019, Sarco signed his first professional contract with the club on 29 March 2022 until 31 December 2024 and joined their reserves. He made his senior and professional debut with Vélez Sarsfield as a substitute in a 1–0 Argentine Primera División loss to Talleres de Córdoba on 30 March 2024. In July 2024, Bayer 04 Leverkusen expressed an interest in signing Sarco. Sarco refused to extend his contract with Vélez Sarsfield, and the club removed him from the first team. Sarco was released from Vélez Sarsfield in November 2024, and on 4 December 2024 it was announced that he had signed with Bayer Leverkusen on a free-transfer starting on 1 January 2025 for 4 seasons.

On 20 January 2026, Sarco was loaned by Borussia Mönchengladbach, also of Bundesliga. On 21 July, he moved to Spain after signing a contract with Segunda División side Sporting Gijón.

== International career ==
Born and raised in Argentina, Sarco is of Italian descent and holds dual-citizenship. He played for the Argentina U17s at the 2023 South American U-17 Championship.

== Playing style ==
Sarco is a left-footed forward who is dynamic and fast, and has a stocky build that allows him to assert himself on the field.

== Career statistics ==
As of match played 9 May 2026

Appearances and goals by club, season and competition
Club	Season	League			National cup (Note: Includes Copa Argentina)		Continental		Other		Total	
Club	Season	Division	Apps	Goals	Apps	Goals	Apps	Goals	Apps	Goals	Apps	Goals
Vélez Sarsfield II	2022	Copa Proyección	3	0	—		—		—		3	0
Vélez Sarsfield II	2023	Copa Proyección	15	7	—		—		—		15	7
Vélez Sarsfield II	2024	Copa Proyección	5	5	—		—		—		5	5
Vélez Sarsfield II	Total		23	12	—		—		—		23	12
Vélez Sarsfield	2024	AFA Liga Profesional de Fútbol	8	1	1	0	—		—		9	1
Bayer Leverkusen	2025–26	Bundesliga	3	0	0	0	0	0	—		3	0
Borussia Mönchengladbach (loan)	2025–26	Bundesliga	3	0	—		—		—		3	0
Borussia Mönchengladbach II (loan)	2025–26	Regionalliga West	5	2	—		—		—		5	2
Career total			42	15	1	0	0	0	0	0	43	15

== Honours ==
Vélez Sarsfield

- Argentine Primera División: 2024
