= Issa Traoré (footballer, born 2007) =

Malian footballer (born 2007)

Personal information
- Date of birth: 14 November 2007 (age 18)
- Place of birth: Mali
- Height: 1.89 m (6 ft 2 in)
- Position: Defender

Team information
- Current team: Trenčín (on loan from Bayer Leverkusen)
- Number: 4

Youth career
- –2025: Djoliba AC
- 2026–: Bayer Leverkusen

Senior career*
Years	Team	Apps	(Gls)
2026–	Bayer Leverkusen	0	(0)
2026–	→ Trenčín (loan)	0	(0)

International career^{‡}
2023	Mali U17	7	(0)
2025–	Mali U23	1	(0)
- * Club domestic league appearances and goals ‡ National team caps and goals as of 18 November 2025

Issa Traoré (born 14 November 2007) is a Malian professional footballer who plays as a defender for Slovak First Football League club Trenčín, on loan from Bundesliga club Bayer Leverkusen.

== Club career ==
As a youth player, Traoré joined the youth academy of Malian side Djoliba AC. Following his stint there, he joined the youth academy of German Bundesliga side Bayer Leverkusen in 2026.

On 6 July 2026, he moved on loan to Trenčín in the Slovak First Football League.

== International career ==
Traoré is a Mali youth international. During November 2023, he played for the Mali national under-17 football team at the 2023 FIFA U-17 World Cup.

== Style of play ==
Traoré plays as a defender. African news website Africafoot.com wrote in 2024 that he "quickly distinguished himself with his athletic and physical potential... standing over 1.90 meters tall, Issa Traoré possesses an impressive physique".
