= Abdoulaye Faye (footballer, born 2004) =

Senegalese footballer (born 2004)

Personal information
- Date of birth: 22 September 2004 (age 22)
- Place of birth: Kaolack, Senegal
- Height: 1.91 m (6 ft 3 in)
- Position: Centre-back

Team information
- Current team: Celta (on loan from Bayer Leverkusen)
- Number: 4

Youth career
- –2023: Diambars

Senior career*
Years	Team	Apps	(Gls)
2023–2025	Häcken	6	(0)
2024	→ Örgryte IS (loan)	22	(0)
2025–	Bayer Leverkusen	0	(0)
2025–2026	→ Lorient (loan)	17	(0)
2026–	→ Celta (loan)	0	(0)
- * Club domestic league appearances and goals as of 19 May 2026

Abdoulaye Faye (born 22 September 2004) is a Senegalese footballer who plays as a defender for La Liga club Celta Vigo, on loan from Bundesliga club Bayer Leverkusen.

== Career ==
A left-footed central defender, Faye joined Swedish Allsvenskan club BK Häcken in August 2023 from Senegalese youth academy Diambars FC as a 19 year-old, signing a three-year contract. The following year, he received regular game time during a loan spell at Örgryte IS in the Superettan, the Swedish second division. After returning to Hacken, he was a goalscorer in March 2025 as BK Häcken knocked Mjällby AIF out of the Swedish Cup at the quarterfinal stage.

On 27 June 2025, Faye signed a five-year contract with Bundesliga side Bayer Leverkusen. On 29 July 2025, he was loaned by Lorient in France for the season.

On 3 August 2026, Faye renewed his link with Bayer until 2031, and was loaned to La Liga side Celta Vigo for one year.

== Career statistics ==
=== Club ===
As of match played 1 June 2025

Club	Season	League			National cup		Continental		Other		Total	
Club	Season	Division	Apps	Goals	Apps	Goals	Apps	Goals	Apps	Goals	Apps	Goals
Örgryte IS	2023–24	Superettan	22	0	1	0	—		—		23	0
Häcken	2025	Allsvenskan	6	0	5	2	—		—		11	0
Häcken	Total		11	0	2	2	—		—		11	2
Career total			39	0	2	2	—		—		41	2
