= 2023–24 Bayer 04 Leverkusen season =

Bayer 04 Leverkusen
2023–24 season
- Administration: Fernando Carro (CEO); Simon Rolfes (Managing Director Sports)
- Head coach: Xabi Alonso
- Stadium: BayArena
- Bundesliga: 1st
- DFB-Pokal: Winners
- UEFA Europa League: Runners-up
- Top goalscorer: League: Victor Boniface (14); All: Victor Boniface (21)
Home colours	Away colours	Third colours

The 2023–24 season was Bayer 04 Leverkusen's 120th season in existence and 45th consecutive season in the Bundesliga. They also competed in the DFB-Pokal and the UEFA Europa League.

Following a 5–0 victory over Werder Bremen on 14 April 2024, Bayer Leverkusen won the Bundesliga title for the first time in the club's history. It also marked the club's first major trophy since 1993. In addition, they became the first team in history to win the Bundesliga without losing a single match, finishing the competition with 28 wins and 6 draws.

On 9 May 2024, following a 2–2 draw against Roma in the Europa League semi-final second leg, the club set a new European record for consecutive competitive matches without a loss (49), breaking Benfica's record of 48 games unbeaten set between 1963 and 1965. In the pursuit of achieving this record, the club succeeded in netting 17 goals during stoppage time and 34 goals from the 80th minute onwards, encompassing crucial last-minute match winners or equalizers. However, Leverkusen's unbeaten run would end at 51 matches, following a 3–0 defeat to Atalanta in the Europa League final on 22 May.

On 25 May, Leverkusen won the DFB-Pokal final against Kaiserslautern and completed an undefeated domestic double, finishing their campaign with just one defeat in 53 competitive matches.

== Players ==
=== First-team squad ===
As of 31 January 2024

Note: Flags indicate national team as defined under FIFA eligibility rules; some limited exceptions apply. Players may hold more than one non-FIFA nationality.

No.	Pos.	Nation	Player
1	GK	FIN	Lukas Hradecky (captain)
2	DF	CRO	Josip Stanišić (on loan from Bayern Munich)
3	DF	ECU	Piero Hincapié
4	DF	GER	Jonathan Tah (vice-captain)
6	DF	CIV	Odilon Kossounou
7	MF	GER	Jonas Hofmann
8	MF	GER	Robert Andrich
9	FW	ESP	Borja Iglesias (on loan from Real Betis)
10	MF	GER	Florian Wirtz
12	DF	BFA	Edmond Tapsoba
13	DF	BRA	Arthur
14	FW	CZE	Patrik Schick
17	GK	CZE	Matěj Kovář
18	MF	BEL	Noah Mbamba

No.	Pos.	Nation	Player
19	MF	NGR	Nathan Tella
20	DF	ESP	Álex Grimaldo
21	MF	MAR	Amine Adli
22	FW	NGR	Victor Boniface
23	FW	CZE	Adam Hložek
24	DF	NED	Timothy Fosu-Mensah
25	MF	ARG	Exequiel Palacios
30	DF	NED	Jeremie Frimpong
31	DF	BEL	Madi Monamay
32	MF	COL	Gustavo Puerta
34	MF	SUI	Granit Xhaka
36	GK	GER	Niklas Lomb
38	FW	GER	Ken Izekor
47	MF	MAR	Ayman Aourir

=== Players out on loan ===
Note: Flags indicate national team as defined under FIFA eligibility rules; some limited exceptions apply. Players may hold more than one non-FIFA nationality.

No.	Pos.	Nation	Player
—	GK	AUT	Patrick Pentz (at Brøndby until 30 June 2024)
—	DF	TOG	Sadik Fofana (at Fortuna Sittard until 30 June 2024)
—	MF	SWE	Jardell Kanga (at De Graafschap until 30 June 2024)

No.	Pos.	Nation	Player
—	FW	ESP	Iker Bravo (at Real Madrid Castilla until 30 June 2024)
—	FW	IRI	Sardar Azmoun (at Roma until 30 June 2024)

== Transfers ==
=== In ===
Pos.	Player	Transferred from	Fee	Date	Source
DF	(Spain) Álex Grimaldo	(Portugal) Benfica	Free	1 July 2023	
DF	(Brazil) Arthur	(Brazil) América Mineiro	€7,000,000	1 July 2023	
MF	(Germany) Jonas Hofmann	(Germany) Borussia Mönchengladbach	€10,000,000	5 July 2023	
MF	(Switzerland) Granit Xhaka	(England) Arsenal	€25,000,000	6 July 2023	
FW	(Nigeria) Victor Boniface	(Belgium) Union Saint-Gilloise	€20,000,000	22 July 2023	
GK	(Czech Republic) Matěj Kovář	(England) Manchester United	€5,000,000	15 August 2023	
DF	(Croatia) Josip Stanišić	(Germany) Bayern Munich	Loan	20 August 2023	
MF	(Nigeria) Nathan Tella	(England) Southampton	€23,300,000	27 August 2023	
FW	(Spain) Borja Iglesias	(Spain) Real Betis	Loan	27 January 2024	

=== Out ===
Pos.	Player	Transferred to	Fee	Date	Source
MF	(Morocco) Ayman Azhil	(Germany) Borussia Dortmund II	Free	1 July 2023	
FW	(Germany) Karim Bellarabi	Free agent	Free	1 July 2023	
GK	(Germany) Lennart Grill	(Germany) Union Berlin	Undisclosed	1 July 2023	
GK	(Russia) Andrey Lunyov	(Azerbaijan) Qarabağ	Free	1 July 2023	
FW	(Brazil) Paulinho	(Brazil) Atlético Mineiro	Free	1 July 2023	
DF	(Netherlands) Daley Sinkgraven	(Spain) Las Palmas	Free	1 July 2023	
DF	(Netherlands) Mitchel Bakker	(Italy) Atalanta	€10,000,000	7 July 2023	
FW	(France) Moussa Diaby	(England) Aston Villa	€55,000,000	22 July 2023	
MF	(Togo) Sadik Fofana	(Netherlands) Fortuna Sittard	Loan	25 July 2023	
MF	(Germany) Kerem Demirbay	(Turkey) Galatasaray	€3,700,000	3 August 2023	
MF	(Germany) Joshua Eze	(Germany) Fortuna Köln	Free	4 August 2023	
GK	(Austria) Patrick Pentz	(Denmark) Brøndby	Loan	18 August 2023	
FW	(Iran) Sardar Azmoun	(Italy) Roma	Loan	26 August 2023	
MF	(Germany) Nadiem Amiri	(Germany) Mainz 05	€1,000,000	31 January 2024	

== Competitions ==
=== Overall record ===
Competition	First match	Last match	Starting round	Final position	Record							
Competition	First match	Last match	Starting round	Final position	Pld	W	D	L	GF	GA	GD	Win %
Bundesliga	19 August 2023	18 May 2024	Matchday 1	Winners	34	28	6	0	89	24	+65	82.35
DFB-Pokal	12 August 2023	25 May 2024	First round	Winners	6	6	0	0	24	5	+19	100.00
UEFA Europa League	21 September 2023	22 May 2024	Group stage	Runners-up	13	9	3	1	31	13	+18	69.23
Total					53	43	9	1	144	42	+102	81.13

Source: Soccerway

=== Bundesliga ===
==== League table ====
Pos	Team	Pld	W	D	L	GF	GA	GD	Pts	Qualification or relegation
1	Bayer Leverkusen (C)	34	28	6	0	89	24	+65	90	Qualification for the Champions League league phase (Note: The Bundesliga gained an additional Champions League place as a result of Germany finishing as one of the two associations with the highest UEFA coefficient points in 2023–24.)
2	VfB Stuttgart	34	23	4	7	78	39	+39	73	Qualification for the Champions League league phase
3	Bayern Munich	34	23	3	8	94	45	+49	72	Qualification for the Champions League league phase
4	RB Leipzig	34	19	8	7	77	39	+38	65	Qualification for the Champions League league phase
5	Borussia Dortmund	34	18	9	7	68	43	+25	63	Qualification for the Champions League league phase

Source: DFB
Rules for classification: 1) Points; 2) Goal difference; 3) Goals scored; 4) Head-to-head results; 5) Head-to-head away goals scored; 6) Away goals scored; 7) Play-off.
(C) Champions

==== Results summary ====
Overall								Home						Away					
Pld	W	D	L	GF	GA	GD	Pts	W	D	L	GF	GA	GD	W	D	L	GF	GA	GD
34	28	6	0	89	24	+65	90	14	3	0	47	11	+36	14	3	0	42	13	+29

Source: DFB

==== Results by round ====
Round	1	2	3	4	5	6	7	8	9	10	11	12	13	14	15	16	17	18	19	20	21	22	23	24	25	26	27	28	29	30	31	32	33	34
Ground	H	A	H	A	H	A	H	A	H	A	H	A	H	A	H	H	A	A	H	A	H	A	H	A	H	A	H	A	H	A	H	A	A	H
Result	W	W	W	D	W	W	W	W	W	W	W	W	D	D	W	W	W	W	D	W	W	W	W	W	W	W	W	W	W	D	D	W	W	W
Position	5	3	1	1	2	1	1	1	1	1	1	1	1	1	1	1	1	1	1	1	1	1	1	1	1	1	1	1	1	1	1	1	1	1
Points	3	6	9	10	13	16	19	22	25	28	31	34	35	36	39	42	45	48	49	52	55	58	61	64	67	70	73	76	79	80	81	84	87	90

Source: DFB
A = Away; H = Home; W = Win; D = Draw; L = Loss

==== Matches ====
The league fixtures were unveiled on 30 June 2023.

19 August 2023 1	Bayer Leverkusen	3–2	RB Leipzig	Leverkusen
15:30 CEST (UTC+2)	Frimpong 24'; Tah 35'; Wirtz 64'; Boniface (yellow card) 69'	Report	Olmo 39'; Seiwald (yellow card) 62'; Openda 71'; Lukeba (yellow card) 81'	Stadium: BayArena; Attendance: 29,464; Referee: Felix Brych

26 August 2023 2	Borussia Mönchengladbach	0–3	Bayer Leverkusen	Mönchengladbach
18:30 CEST (UTC+2)	Čvančara (yellow card) 45+3'; Itakura (yellow card) 45+5'	Report	Boniface (yellow card) 16', (goal) 18', 53'; Frimpong (yellow card) 45+3'; Tah (yellow card) 45+4', (goal) 45+6'	Stadium: Borussia-Park; Attendance: 54,042; Referee: Christian Dingert

2 September 2023 3	Bayer Leverkusen	5–1	Darmstadt 98	Leverkusen
15:30 CEST (UTC+2)	Boniface 21', 61'; Tah (yellow card) 24'; Palacios (yellow card) 27', (goal) 49'; Xhaka (yellow card) 31'; Hofmann 67'; Hložek 83'	Report	Vilhelmsson 25', (yellow card) 53'; Klarer (yellow card) 80'	Stadium: BayArena; Attendance: 29,653; Referee: Sven Jablonski

15 September 2023 4	Bayern Munich	2–2	Bayer Leverkusen	Munich
20:30 CEST (UTC+2)	Kane 7'; Goretzka 86'	Report	Grimaldo 24'; Hofmann (yellow card) 34'; Wirtz (yellow card) 47'; Tapsoba (yellow card) 69'; Palacios 90+4' (pen.)	Stadium: Allianz Arena; Attendance: 75,000; Referee: Daniel Schlager

24 September 2023 5	Bayer Leverkusen	4–1	1. FC Heidenheim	Leverkusen
15:30 CEST (UTC+2)	Boniface 9', 74' (pen.); Palacios (yellow card) 31'; Hofmann 63'; Adli 82'	Report	Theuerkauf (yellow card) 37'; Dinkçi 58'	Stadium: BayArena; Attendance: 29,557; Referee: Christian Dingert

30 September 2023 6	Mainz 05	0–3	Bayer Leverkusen	Mainz
15:30 CEST (UTC+2)	Fernandes (yellow card) 58'; Gruda (yellow card) 75'; Richter (yellow card) 90+2'; Barreiro (yellow card) 90+4'	Report	Xhaka (yellow card) 4'; Van den Berg 18' (o.g.); Grimaldo 59'; Hofmann 65'	Stadium: Mewa Arena; Attendance: 33,305; Referee: Benjamin Brand

8 October 2023 7	Bayer Leverkusen	3–0	1. FC Köln	Leverkusen
15:30 CEST (UTC+2)	Hofmann 22'; Frimpong (yellow card) 23', (goal) 32'; Tapsoba (yellow card) 45+4'; Tah (yellow card) 61'; Boniface 67'	Report	Baumgart (yellow card) 24'	Stadium: BayArena; Attendance: 30,210; Referee: Felix Zwayer

21 October 2023 8	VfL Wolfsburg	1–2	Bayer Leverkusen	Wolfsburg
15:30 CEST (UTC+2)	Arnold (yellow card) 36'; Lacroix 41'; Baku (yellow card) 45'; Mæhle (yellow card) 65'	Report	Frimpong 13'; Palacios (yellow card) 37'; Xhaka (yellow card) 55'; Adli (yellow card) 56'; Grimaldo 62'; Hofmann (yellow card) 74'; Tapsoba (yellow card) 86'	Stadium: Volkswagen Arena; Attendance: 28,917; Referee: Marco Fritz

29 October 2023 9	Bayer Leverkusen	2–1	SC Freiburg	Leverkusen
17:30 CEST (UTC+2)	Wirtz 36'; Hofmann 60'	Report	Kübler (yellow card) 14'; Gulde 70'; Höler (yellow card) 90+4'	Stadium: BayArena; Attendance: 30,210; Referee: Daniel Siebert

4 November 2023 10	1899 Hoffenheim	2–3	Bayer Leverkusen	Hoffenheim
15:30 CET (UTC+1)	Weghorst (yellow card) 45+3', (goal) 58'; Kabak (yellow card) 48'; Stach 56'; Prömel (yellow card) 60'	Report	Wirtz 9'; Grimaldo 45+1', 70'; Hradecky (yellow card) 72'; Tah (yellow card) 81'	Stadium: Rhein-Neckar-Arena; Attendance: 30,150; Referee: Frank Willenborg

12 November 2023 11	Bayer Leverkusen	4–0	Union Berlin	Leverkusen
15:30 CET (UTC+1)	Grimaldo 23'; Kossounou 57'; Tah 73'; Tella 83'	Report	Rönnow (yellow card) 74'	Stadium: BayArena; Attendance: 29,387; Referee: Timo Gerach

25 November 2023 12	Werder Bremen	0–3	Bayer Leverkusen	Bremen
15:30 CET (UTC+1)	Bittencourt (yellow card) 14'; Friedl (yellow card) 36'; Deman (yellow card) 54'	Report	Deman 9' (o.g.); Frimpong 43'; Grimaldo 76', (yellow card) 76'	Stadium: Weserstadion; Attendance: 42,100; Referee: Martin Petersen

3 December 2023 13	Bayer Leverkusen	1–1	Borussia Dortmund	Leverkusen
17:30 CET (UTC+1)	Frimpong (yellow card) 12'; Palacios (yellow card) 74'; Boniface 74'; Kossounou (yellow card) 90+1'	Report	Ryerson 5'; Hummels (yellow card) 77'; Wolf (yellow card) 90+1'	Stadium: BayArena; Attendance: 30,210; Referee: Daniel Siebert

10 December 2023 14	VfB Stuttgart	1–1	Bayer Leverkusen	Stuttgart
15:30 CET (UTC+1)	Führich 40'; Karazor (yellow card) 65'	Report	Kossounou (yellow card) 6'; Wirtz 47'	Stadium: MHPArena; Attendance: 54,500; Referee: Deniz Aytekin

17 December 2023 15	Bayer Leverkusen	3–0	Eintracht Frankfurt	Leverkusen
17:30 CET (UTC+1)	Palacios (yellow card) 12'; Boniface 14'; Frimpong 51'; Wirtz 57'	Report	Götze (yellow card) 33'; Pacho (yellow card) 90+4'	Stadium: BayArena; Attendance: 30,210; Referee: Christian Dingert

20 December 2023 16	Bayer Leverkusen	4–0	VfL Bochum	Leverkusen
20:30 CET (UTC+1)	Schick 30' (pen.), 32', 45+1'; Boniface 69'	Report	Mašović (yellow card) 39'; Schlotterbeck (yellow card) 51'	Stadium: BayArena; Attendance: 30,210; Referee: Daniel Schlager

13 January 2024 17	FC Augsburg	0–1	Bayer Leverkusen	Augsburg
15:30 CET (UTC+1)	Vargas (yellow card) 18'; Iago (yellow card) 19'; Dorsch (yellow card) 44'	Report	Hofmann (yellow card) 45+1'; Palacios 90+4'	Stadium: WWK Arena; Attendance: 30,055; Referee: Sven Jablonski

20 January 2024 18	RB Leipzig	2–3	Bayer Leverkusen	Leipzig
18:30 CET (UTC+1)	Simons 7', (yellow card) 71'; Openda 56'; Schlager (yellow card) 87'	Report	Tah (yellow card) 12', (goal) 63'; Stanišić (yellow card) 38'; Tella 47'; Wirtz (yellow card) 66'; Hincapié 90+1'	Stadium: Red Bull Arena; Attendance: 46,529; Referee: Matthias Jöllenbeck

27 January 2024 19	Bayer Leverkusen	0–0	Borussia Mönchengladbach	Leverkusen
18:30 CET (UTC+1)	Xhaka (yellow card) 47'; Schick (yellow card) 66'; Stanišić (yellow card) 74'	Report	Weigl (yellow card) 81'	Stadium: BayArena; Attendance: 30,210; Referee: Deniz Aytekin

3 February 2024 20	Darmstadt 98	0–2	Bayer Leverkusen	Darmstadt
15:30 CET (UTC+1)	Zimmermann (yellow card) 49'; Franjić (yellow card) 68'	Report	Andrich (yellow card) 7'; Tella 33', 52'; Hložek (yellow card) 74'	Stadium: Merck-Stadion am Böllenfalltor; Attendance: 17,810; Referee: Tobias Reichel

10 February 2024 21	Bayer Leverkusen	3–0	Bayern Munich	Leverkusen
18:30 CET (UTC+1)	Stanišić 18'; Grimaldo 50'; Tapsoba (yellow card) 64'; Adli (yellow card) 77'; Hradecky (yellow card) 83'; Frimpong 90+5'	Report	Boey (yellow card) 36'; Goretzka (yellow card) 62'	Stadium: BayArena; Attendance: 30,210; Referee: Felix Zwayer

17 February 2024 22	1. FC Heidenheim	1–2	Bayer Leverkusen	Heidenheim
15:30 CET (UTC+1)	Föhrenbach (yellow card) 27'; Gimber (yellow card) 32'; Kleindienst 87'	Report	Frimpong 45+2'; Adli 81'; Andrich (yellow card) 90+2'	Stadium: Voith-Arena; Attendance: 15,000; Referee: Harm Osmers

23 February 2024 23	Bayer Leverkusen	2–1	Mainz 05	Leverkusen
20:30 CET (UTC+1)	Xhaka 3'; Frimpong (yellow card) 45+1'; Tah (yellow card) 49'; Andrich 68'; Wirtz (yellow card) 74'	Report	Kohr 7', (yellow card) 52'; Onisiwo (yellow card) 42'; Zentner (yellow card) 54'; Caci (yellow card) 66'; Ngankam (red card) 80'; Mwene (yellow card) 85'	Stadium: BayArena; Attendance: 30,210; Referee: Timo Gerach

3 March 2024 24	1. FC Köln	0–2	Bayer Leverkusen	Cologne
15:30 CET (UTC+1)	Thielmann (red card) 14'; Ljubičić (yellow card) 16'; Martel (yellow card) 30'	Report	Frimpong (yellow card) 23', (goal) 38'; Stanišić (yellow card) 59'; Grimaldo 73'	Stadium: RheinEnergieStadion; Attendance: 50,000; Referee: Tobias Stieler

10 March 2024 25	Bayer Leverkusen	2–0	VfL Wolfsburg	Leverkusen
19:30 CET (UTC+1)	Tella 37'; Adli (yellow card) 80'; Wirtz 86'	Report	Gerhardt (yellow card) 7'; Jenz (yellow card) 12' (yellow-red card) 28'	Stadium: BayArena; Attendance: 29,314; Referee: Daniel Siebert

17 March 2024 26	SC Freiburg	2–3	Bayer Leverkusen	Freiburg
15:30 CET (UTC+1)	Dōan 10'; Höfler (yellow card) 72'; Keitel 79'	Report	Wirtz 2'; Hložek 40'; Schick 53'	Stadium: Europa-Park Stadion; Attendance: 34,700; Referee: Harm Osmers

30 March 2024 27	Bayer Leverkusen	2–1	1899 Hoffenheim	Leverkusen
15:30 CET (UTC+1)	Andrich 88'; Schick 90+1'	Report	Drexler (yellow card) 19'; Beier 33'	Stadium: BayArena; Attendance: 30,210; Referee: Deniz Aytekin

6 April 2024 28	Union Berlin	0–1	Bayer Leverkusen	Berlin
15:30 CEST (UTC+2)	Gosens (yellow card) 9' (yellow-red card) 45+3'; Tousart (yellow card) 37'	Report	Wirtz 45+8' (pen.); Adli (yellow card) 64'; Andrich (yellow card) 82'	Stadium: Stadion An der Alten Försterei; Attendance: 22,012; Referee: Benjamin Brand

14 April 2024 29	Bayer Leverkusen	5–0	Werder Bremen	Leverkusen
17:30 CEST (UTC+2)	Boniface 25' (pen.); Adli (yellow card) 31'; Hincapié (yellow card) 47'; Xhaka 60'; Wirtz 68', 83', 90'	Report	Bittencourt (yellow card) 47'	Stadium: BayArena; Attendance: 30,210; Referee: Harm Osmers

21 April 2024 30	Borussia Dortmund	1–1	Bayer Leverkusen	Dortmund
17:30 CEST (UTC+2)	Maatsen (yellow card) 37'; Can (yellow card) 45+2'; Füllkrug (yellow card) 45+3', (goal) 81'; Schlotterbeck (yellow card) 88'	Report	Tella (yellow card) 28'; Frimpong (yellow card) 88'; Xhaka (yellow card) 90+1'; Stanišić 90+7'	Stadium: Signal Iduna Park; Attendance: 81,365; Referee: Daniel Siebert

27 April 2024 31	Bayer Leverkusen	2–2	VfB Stuttgart	Leverkusen
18:30 CEST (UTC+2)	Palacios (yellow card) 31'; Kossounou (yellow card) 41'; Andrich (yellow card) 58', (goal) 90+6'; Adli 61'; Hincapié (yellow card) 84'	Report	Undav (yellow card) 42', (goal) 57'; Führich 47'; Millot (yellow card) 69'; Mittelstädt (yellow card) 77'	Stadium: BayArena; Attendance: 30,210; Referee: Felix Zwayer

5 May 2024 32	Eintracht Frankfurt	1–5	Bayer Leverkusen	Frankfurt
17:30 CEST (UTC+2)	Ekitike 32'	Report	Xhaka 12'; Schick 44'; Palacios 58' (pen.); Frimpong 77'; Boniface 89' (pen.)	Stadium: Deutsche Bank Park; Attendance: 58,000; Referee: Christian Dingert

12 May 2024 33	VfL Bochum	0–5	Bayer Leverkusen	Bochum
19:30 CEST (UTC+2)	Passlack (red card) 15'; Schlotterbeck (yellow card) 45+1'; Ordets (yellow card) 63'	Report	Tella (yellow card) 27'; Schick 41'; Boniface 45+2' (pen.); Adli 76'; Stanišić 86'; Grimaldo 90+3'	Stadium: Ruhrstadion; Attendance: 26,000; Referee: Benjamin Brand

18 May 2024 34	Bayer Leverkusen	2–1	FC Augsburg	Leverkusen
15:30 CEST (UTC+2)	Boniface 12'; Andrich 27'	Report	Kömür 62'; Uduokhai (yellow card) 82'	Stadium: BayArena; Attendance: 30,210; Referee: Matthias Jöllenbeck

=== DFB-Pokal ===
12 August 2023 First round	Teutonia Ottensen	0–8	Bayer Leverkusen	Hamburg
15:30 CEST (UTC+2)	Maiolo (yellow card) 28'	Report	Tapsoba 16'; Boniface 42'; Wirtz 45+1'; Adli 59' (pen.); Frimpong 67'; Hložek 74', 89', (yellow card) 86'; Hofmann 81'	Stadium: Millerntor-Stadion; Attendance: 11,035; Referee: Tom Bauer
Note: The match took place at the Millerntor-Stadion instead of Teutonia Ottensen's home stadium, the Stadion Hoheluft in Ottensen.

1 November 2023 Second round	SV Sandhausen	2–5	Bayer Leverkusen	Sandhausen
18:00 CET (UTC+1)	Fuchs (yellow card) 20'; Evina (yellow card) 49'; Ehlich 50'; Ben Balla 57'	Report	Palacios 21' (pen.), (yellow card) 28'; Tah 54'; Grimaldo (yellow card) 71'; Hložek (yellow card) 76', (goal) 85'; Adli 88', 90+2'	Stadium: GP Stadion am Hardtwald; Attendance: 10,022; Referee: Richard Hempel

6 December 2023 Round of 16	Bayer Leverkusen	3–1	SC Paderborn	Leverkusen
18:00 CET (UTC+1)	Boniface 12'; Palacios 28'; Schick 87'	Report	Bilbija (yellow card) 44'; Klaas 83'; Kinsombi (yellow card) 85'	Stadium: BayArena; Attendance: 29,249; Referee: Tobias Stieler

6 February 2024 Quarter-finals	Bayer Leverkusen	3–2	VfB Stuttgart	Leverkusen
20:45 CET (UTC+1)	Andrich (yellow card) 18', (goal) 50'; Frimpong (yellow card) 34'; Adli 66'; Tah 90'	Report	Anton 11'; Mittelstädt (yellow card) 25'; Führich 58'	Stadium: BayArena; Attendance: 30,210; Referee: Daniel Schlager

3 April 2024 Semi-finals	Bayer Leverkusen	4–0	Fortuna Düsseldorf	Leverkusen
20:45 CEST (UTC+2)	Frimpong 7'; Adli 20'; Wirtz 36', 60' (pen.)	Report	Tzolis (yellow card) 37'	Stadium: BayArena; Attendance: 30,210; Referee: Christian Dingert

25 May 2024 Final	1. FC Kaiserslautern	0–1	Bayer Leverkusen	Berlin
20:00 CEST (UTC+2)	Elvedi (yellow card) 86'; Klement (yellow card) 90+6'	Report	Kossounou (yellow card) 3' (yellow-red card) 44'; Xhaka 17'; Hradecky (yellow card) 90+7'	Stadium: Olympiastadion; Attendance: 74,322; Referee: Bastian Dankert

=== UEFA Europa League ===
==== Group stage ====
The draw for the group stage was held on 1 September 2023.

Pos	Team	Pld	W	D	L	GF	GA	GD	Pts	Qualification	LEV	QAR	MOL	HAC
1	(Germany) Bayer Leverkusen	6	6	0	0	19	3	+16	18	Advance to round of 16	—	5–1	5–1	4–0
2	(Azerbaijan) Qarabağ	6	3	1	2	7	9	−2	10	Advance to knockout round play-offs	0–1	—	1–0	2–1
3	(Norway) Molde	6	2	1	3	12	12	0	7	Transfer to Europa Conference League	1–2	2–2	—	5–1
4	(Sweden) BK Häcken	6	0	0	6	3	17	−14	0		0–2	0–1	1–3	—

Source: UEFA
Rules for classification: Group stage tiebreakers

21 September 2023 1	Bayer Leverkusen (Germany)	4–0	(Sweden) BK Häcken	Leverkusen
18:45 CEST (UTC+2)	Wirtz 10'; Adli 16'; Tapsoba (yellow card) 30'; Boniface 66'; Hofmann 70'	Report		Stadium: BayArena; Attendance: 25,402; Referee: Manfredas Lukjančukas (Lithuania)

5 October 2023 2	Molde (Norway)	1–2	(Germany) Bayer Leverkusen	Molde, Norway
21:00 CEST (UTC+2)	Eriksen (yellow card) 42'; Løvik (yellow card) 67'; Breivik 87'	Report	Frimpong 14'; Tella 18'	Stadium: Aker Stadion; Attendance: 8,190; Referee: Anastasios Papapetrou (Greece)

26 October 2023 3	Bayer Leverkusen (Germany)	5–1	(Azerbaijan) Qarabağ	Leverkusen
21:00 CEST (UTC+2)	Wirtz 6', (yellow card) 15'; Grimaldo 29', 55'; Boniface 36'; Andrich (yellow card) 43'; Tapsoba 57'	Report	Bayramov 16' (pen.); Andrade (yellow card) 19'; Romão (yellow card) 45+1'; Cafarguliyev (yellow card) 77'	Stadium: BayArena; Attendance: 29,039; Referee: Horațiu Feșnic (Romania)

9 November 2023 4	Qarabağ (Azerbaijan)	0–1	(Germany) Bayer Leverkusen	Baku, Azerbaijan
21:45 AZT (UTC+4)	Medina (yellow card) 25'; Vešović (yellow card) 35'; Romão (yellow card) 69'; Gugeshashvili (yellow card) 90+3'	Report	Wirtz (yellow card) 68'; Xhaka (yellow card) 69'; Boniface 90+4' (pen.)	Stadium: Tofiq Bahramov Republican Stadium; Attendance: 30,005; Referee: Craig Pawson (England)

30 November 2023 5	BK Häcken (Sweden)	0–2	(Germany) Bayer Leverkusen	Gothenburg, Sweden
21:0 CET (UTC+1)		Report	Boniface 14', (yellow card) 25'; Schick 74'	Stadium: Ullevi; Attendance: 11,234; Referee: Julian Weinberger (Austria)
Note: The match was played at the Ullevi in Gothenburg, instead of BK Häcken's regular stadium, the Bravida Arena, which did not meet UEFA requirements.

14 December 2023 6	Bayer Leverkusen (Germany)	5–1	(Norway) Molde	Leverkusen
18:45 CET (UTC+1)	Schick 6'; Tapsoba 22'; Ellingsen 25' (o.g.); Tah (yellow card) 42'; Hložek 60', 70'; Grimaldo (yellow card) 78'	Report	Kitolano 75'	Stadium: BayArena; Attendance: 28,504; Referee: Robert Jones (England)

==== Knockout phase ====
===== Round of 16 =====
The draw for the round of 16 was held on 23 February 2024.

7 March 2024 First leg	Qarabağ (Azerbaijan)	2–2	(Germany) Bayer Leverkusen	Baku, Azerbaijan
21:45 AZT (UTC+4)	Juninho (yellow card) 8', (goal) 45+2'; Benzia 26'	Report	Wirtz 70'; Schick 90+2'	Stadium: Tofiq Bahramov Republican Stadium; Attendance: 30,423; Referee: Benoît Bastien (France)

14 March 2024 Second leg	Bayer Leverkusen (Germany)	3–2 (5–4 agg.)	(Azerbaijan) Qarabağ	Leverkusen
21:00 CET (UTC+1)	Schick (yellow card) 70', (goal) 90+3', 90+8'; Frimpong 72'	Report	Zoubir 58'; Cafarguliyev (red card) 63'; Juninho 67', (yellow card) 78'; Lunyov (yellow card) 90'	Stadium: BayArena; Attendance: 30,210; Referee: Anthony Taylor (England)

===== Quarter-finals =====
The draw for the quarter-finals was held on 15 March 2024.

11 April 2024 First leg	Bayer Leverkusen (Germany)	2–0	(England) West Ham United	Leverkusen
21:00 CEST (UTC+2)	Hofmann 83'; Boniface 90+1'	Report	Paquetá (yellow card) 21'; Emerson (yellow card) 56'	Stadium: BayArena; Attendance: 30,210; Referee: Artur Soares Dias (Portugal)

18 April 2024 Second leg	West Ham United (England)	1–1 (1–3 agg.)	(Germany) Bayer Leverkusen	London, England
20:00 BST (UTC+1)	Antonio 13', (yellow card) 31'; Bowen (yellow card) 72'; Coufal (yellow card) 79'; Zouma (yellow card) 79'; Souček (yellow card) 85'; Álvarez (yellow card) 90'	Report	Kossounou (yellow card) 5'; Tah (yellow card) 31'; Palacios (yellow card) 85'; Kovář (yellow card) 87'; Frimpong 89'; Adli (yellow card) 90'	Stadium: London Stadium; Attendance: 62,473; Referee: José María Sánchez Martínez (Spain)

===== Semi-finals =====
The draw for the semi-finals was held on 15 March 2024, after the draw for the quarter-finals.

2 May 2024 First leg	Roma (Italy)	0–2	(Germany) Bayer Leverkusen	Rome, Italy
21:00 CEST (UTC+2)	Pellegrini (yellow card) 30'; Spinazzola (yellow card) 75'; Cristante (yellow card) 78'	Report	Tah (yellow card) 16'; Wirtz 28'; Andrich 73', (yellow card) 76'; Xhaka (yellow card) 75'	Stadium: Stadio Olimpico; Attendance: 64,073; Referee: François Letexier (France)

9 May 2024 Second leg	Bayer Leverkusen (Germany)	2–2 (4–2 agg.)	(Italy) Roma	Leverkusen
20:00 BST (UTC+1)	Tapsoba (yellow card) 20'; Tah (yellow card) 42'; Mancini 82' (o.g.); Wirtz (yellow card) 89'; Stanišić 90+7'	Report	Mancini (yellow card) 20'; Pellegrini (yellow card) 21'; Paredes (yellow card) 27', (goal) 43' (pen.), 66' (pen.); Zalewski (yellow card) 29'	Stadium: BayArena; Attendance: 30,210; Referee: Danny Makkelie (Netherlands)

===== Final =====
22 May 2024 Final	Atalanta (Italy)	3–0	(Germany) Bayer Leverkusen	Dublin, Ireland
20:00 BST (UTC+1)	Lookman 12', 26', 75'; Djimsiti (yellow card) 22'; Scamacca (yellow card) 35'; Zappacosta (yellow card) 60'; Koopmeiners (yellow card) 70'	Report	Wirtz (yellow card) 35'; Tapsoba (yellow card) 67'; Andrich (yellow card) 73'	Stadium: Aviva Stadium; Attendance: 47,135; Referee: István Kovács (Romania)

== Statistics ==
=== Appearances and goals ===
No.	Pos	Nat	Player	Total		Bundesliga		DFB-Pokal		Europa League	
No.	Pos	Nat	Player	Apps	Goals	Apps	Goals	Apps	Goals	Apps	Goals
Goalkeepers
1	GK	(Finland) FIN	Lukas Hradecky	35	0	33	0	2	0	0	0
17	GK	(Czech Republic) CZE	Matěj Kovář	17	0	1	0	4	0	12	0
36	GK	(Germany) GER	Niklas Lomb	1	0	0	0	0	0	1	0
Defenders
2	DF	(Croatia) CRO	Josip Stanišić	38	4	13+7	3	3+2	0	9+4	1
3	DF	(Ecuador) ECU	Piero Hincapié	43	1	16+10	1	3+2	0	10+2	0
4	DF	(Germany) GER	Jonathan Tah	48	6	30+1	4	4+2	2	11	0
6	DF	(Ivory Coast) CIV	Odilon Kossounou	34	1	21+1	1	2+2	0	4+4	0
12	DF	(Burkina Faso) BFA	Edmond Tapsoba	46	3	23+5	0	5+1	1	11+1	2
13	DF	(Brazil) BRA	Arthur	5	0	2+2	0	0+1	0	0	0
20	DF	(Spain) ESP	Álex Grimaldo	51	12	31+2	10	5+1	0	9+3	2
24	DF	(Netherlands) NED	Timothy Fosu-Mensah	0	0	0	0	0	0	0	0
30	DF	(Netherlands) NED	Jeremie Frimpong	47	14	27+4	9	5+1	2	6+4	3
31	DF	(Belgium) BEL	Madi Monamay	0	0	0	0	0	0	0	0
Midfielders
7	MF	(Germany) GER	Jonas Hofmann	46	8	26+6	5	3+2	1	3+6	2
8	MF	(Germany) GER	Robert Andrich	45	6	18+10	4	5+1	1	8+3	1
10	MF	(Germany) GER	Florian Wirtz	49	18	26+6	11	5+1	3	8+3	4
18	MF	(Belgium) BEL	Noah Mbamba	6	0	0+3	0	0+1	0	0+2	0
19	MF	(Nigeria) NGR	Nathan Tella	39	6	8+16	5	1+3	0	8+3	1
21	MF	(Morocco) MAR	Amine Adli	42	10	8+15	4	4+2	5	11+2	1
25	MF	(Argentina) ARG	Exequiel Palacios	36	6	21+3	4	3	2	6+3	0
32	MF	(Colombia) COL	Gustavo Puerta	9	0	0+6	0	0	0	2+1	0
34	MF	(Switzerland) SUI	Granit Xhaka	50	4	32+1	3	5+1	1	10+1	0
47	MF	(Morocco) MAR	Ayman Aourir	1	0	0	0	0	0	0+1	0
Forwards
9	FW	(Spain) ESP	Borja Iglesias	10	0	2+5	0	0+1	0	2	0
14	FW	(Czech Republic) CZE	Patrik Schick	33	13	12+8	7	3+1	1	3+6	5
22	FW	(Nigeria) NGR	Victor Boniface	34	21	18+5	14	2+1	2	4+4	5
23	FW	(Czech Republic) CZE	Adam Hložek	36	7	5+18	2	1+3	3	5+4	2
38	FW	(Germany) GER	Ken Izekor	1	0	0	0	0	0	0+1	0
Players transferred out during the season
9	FW	(Iran) IRI	Sardar Azmoun	0	0	0	0	0	0	0	0
11	MF	(Germany) GER	Nadiem Amiri	9	0	1+7	0	1	0	0	0
28	GK	(Austria) AUT	Patrick Pentz	0	0	0	0	0	0	0	0

Source: Competitions

=== Goalscorers ===
Rank	Pos.	No.	Nat.	Player	Bundesliga	DFB-Pokal	Europa League	Total
1	FW	22	(Nigeria)	Victor Boniface	14	2	5	21
2	MF	10	(Germany)	Florian Wirtz	11	3	4	18
3	DF	30	(Netherlands)	Jeremie Frimpong	9	2	3	14
4	FW	14	(Czech Republic)	Patrik Schick	7	1	5	13
5	DF	20	(Spain)	Álex Grimaldo	10	0	2	12
6	MF	21	(Morocco)	Amine Adli	4	5	1	10
7	MF	7	(Germany)	Jonas Hofmann	5	1	2	8
8	FW	23	(Czech Republic)	Adam Hložek	2	3	2	7
9	DF	4	(Germany)	Jonathan Tah	4	2	0	6
9	MF	19	(Nigeria)	Nathan Tella	5	0	1	6
9	MF	25	(Argentina)	Exequiel Palacios	4	2	0	6
9	MF	8	(Germany)	Robert Andrich	4	1	1	6
13	DF	2	(Croatia)	Josip Stanišić	3	0	1	4
13	MF	34	(Switzerland)	Granit Xhaka	3	1	0	4
15	DF	12	(Burkina Faso)	Edmond Tapsoba	0	1	2	3
16	DF	3	(Ecuador)	Piero Hincapié	1	0	0	1
16	DF	6	(Ivory Coast)	Odilon Kossounou	1	0	0	1
Own goals					2	0	2	4
Totals					89	24	31	144
