= 2024–25 Bayer 04 Leverkusen season =

Bayer 04 Leverkusen
2024–25 season
- Administration: Fernando Carro (CEO); Simon Rolfes (Managing Director Sports)
- Head coach: Xabi Alonso
- Stadium: BayArena
- Bundesliga: 2nd
- DFB-Pokal: Semi-finals
- DFL-Supercup: Winners
- UEFA Champions League: Round of 16
- Top goalscorer: League: Patrik Schick (21); All: Patrik Schick (27)
- Average home league attendance: 29,961
| Home colours | Away colours | Third colours |

The 2024–25 season was the 121st season in the history of Bayer 04 Leverkusen, and the club's 46th consecutive season in the Bundesliga. In addition to the domestic league, the club participated in the DFB-Pokal, the DFL-Supercup, and the UEFA Champions League.

== Players ==
=== First-team squad ===
As of 31 January 2025

Note: Flags indicate national team as defined under FIFA eligibility rules; some limited exceptions apply. Players may hold more than one non-FIFA nationality.

| No. | Pos. | Nation | Player |
|---|---|---|---|
| 1 | GK | FIN | Lukas Hradecky (captain) |
| 3 | DF | ECU | Piero Hincapié |
| 4 | DF | GER | Jonathan Tah (vice-captain) |
| 5 | DF | ESP | Mario Hermoso (on loan from Roma) |
| 7 | MF | GER | Jonas Hofmann |
| 8 | MF | GER | Robert Andrich (3rd captain) |
| 10 | FW | GER | Florian Wirtz |
| 11 | MF | FRA | Martin Terrier |
| 12 | DF | BFA | Edmond Tapsoba |
| 13 | DF | BRA | Arthur |
| 14 | FW | CZE | Patrik Schick |
| 16 | MF | ARG | Emiliano Buendía (on loan from Aston Villa) |
| 17 | GK | CZE | Matěj Kovář |

| No. | Pos. | Nation | Player |
|---|---|---|---|
| 18 | FW | ARG | Alejo Sarco |
| 19 | MF | NGR | Nathan Tella |
| 20 | DF | ESP | Álex Grimaldo |
| 21 | MF | MAR | Amine Adli |
| 22 | FW | NGR | Victor Boniface |
| 23 | DF | FRA | Nordi Mukiele (on loan from Paris Saint-Germain) |
| 24 | MF | ESP | Aleix García |
| 25 | MF | ARG | Exequiel Palacios |
| 30 | DF | NED | Jeremie Frimpong |
| 34 | MF | SUI | Granit Xhaka (4th captain) |
| 36 | GK | GER | Niklas Lomb |
| 44 | DF | FRA | Jeanuël Belocian |

=== Players out on loan ===
Note: Flags indicate national team as defined under FIFA eligibility rules; some limited exceptions apply. Players may hold more than one non-FIFA nationality.

| No. | Pos. | Nation | Player |
|---|---|---|---|
| — | DF | CIV | Odilon Kossounou (at Atalanta until 30 June 2025) |
| — | MF | BEL | Noah Mbamba (at Fortuna Düsseldorf until 30 June 2025) |

| No. | Pos. | Nation | Player |
|---|---|---|---|
| — | MF | COL | Gustavo Puerta (at Hull City until 30 June 2025) |

== Transfers ==
=== In ===
| Pos. | Player | Transferred from | Fee | Date | Source |
|---|---|---|---|---|---|
| DF | (Togo) Sadik Fofana | (Netherlands) Fortuna Sittard | Loan return | 30 June 2024 | |
| FW | (Iran) Sardar Azmoun | (Italy) Roma | Loan return | 30 June 2024 | |
| DF | (France) Jeanuël Belocian | (France) Rennes | €15 million | 1 July 2024 | |
| DF | (Italy) Andrea Natali | (Spain) Barcelona | Free | 1 July 2024 | |
| MF | (Spain) Aleix García | (Spain) Girona | €18 million | 1 July 2024 | |
| FW | (France) Martin Terrier | (France) Rennes | €20 million | 18 July 2024 | |
| DF | (France) Nordi Mukiele | (France) Paris Saint-Germain | Loan | 28 August 2024 | |
| FW | (Argentina) Alejo Sarco | (Argentina) Vélez Sarsfield | Free | 1 January 2025 | |
| MF | (Argentina) Emiliano Buendía | (England) Aston Villa | Loan | 29 January 2025 | |
| DF | (Spain) Mario Hermoso | (Italy) Roma | Loan | 31 January 2025 | |

Total expenditure: ▼€53 million (excluding potential add-ons, bonuses and undisclosed figures)

=== Out ===
| Pos. | Player | Transferred to | Fee | Date | Source |
|---|---|---|---|---|---|
| FW | (Spain) Borja Iglesias | (Spain) Real Betis | Loan return | 30 June 2024 | |
| DF | (Croatia) Josip Stanišić | (Germany) Bayern Munich | Loan return | 30 June 2024 | |
| GK | (Austria) Patrick Pentz | (Denmark) Brøndby | €2.55 million | 1 July 2024 | |
| DF | (Germany) Anton Bäuerle | (Germany) SC Paderborn | Free | 1 July 2024 | |
| DF | (Netherlands) Timothy Fosu-Mensah | Free agent | End of contract | 1 July 2024 | |
| FW | (Iran) Sardar Azmoun | (United Arab Emirates) Shabab Al-Ahli | €5 million | 28 July 2024 | |
| FW | (Czech Republic) Adam Hložek | (Germany) TSG Hoffenheim | €18 million | 17 August 2024 | |
| MF | (Colombia) Gustavo Puerta | (England) Hull City | Loan | 27 August 2024 | |
| DF | (Ivory Coast) Odilon Kossounou | (Italy) Atalanta | Loan | 28 August 2024 | |

Total income: ▲€25.55 million (excluding potential add-ons, bonuses and undisclosed figures)

== Friendlies ==
=== Pre-season ===
| 26 July 2024 Friendly | Rot-Weiss Essen | 1–2 | Bayer Leverkusen | Essen |
| 19:00 CEST (UTC+2) | Vonić 89' | Report | Tella 44'; Schick 71' | Stadium: Stadion an der Hafenstraße; Attendance: 10,000; Referee: Thibaut Scheer |

| 3 August 2024 Friendly | Lens | 2–2 | Bayer Leverkusen | Lens, France |
| 16:00 CEST (UTC+2) | Medina (yellow card) 37'; Saïd 45'; Sotoca (yellow card) 60'; Gradit 84' | Report | Terrier 6'; Boniface (yellow card) 33'; Wirtz 51'; Hincapié (yellow card) 72' | Stadium: Stade Bollaert-Delelis; Attendance: 38,223; Referee: Marc Bollengier (France) |

| 7 August 2024 Friendly | Arsenal | 4–1 | Bayer Leverkusen | London, England |
| 20:00 BST (UTC+1) | Zinchenko 8'; Trossard 9'; Gabriel Jesus 38'; Havertz 65' | Report | Hložek 76'; Puerta (yellow card) 89' | Stadium: Emirates Stadium; Attendance: 50,000; Referee: Samuel Barrott (England) |

| 10 August 2024 Friendly | Bayer Leverkusen | 1–1 (3–1 p) | Real Betis | Leverkusen |
| 15:30 CEST (UTC+2) | Belocian 78' | Report | Carvalho (yellow card) 43'; Juanmi 52' | Stadium: BayArena; Attendance: 28,395; Referee: Sascha Stegemann (Germany) |
| | Penalties |
| | Schick (penalty scored); Adli (penalty scored); García (penalty missed); Andrich (penalty scored) | | (penalty scored) Juanmi; (penalty missed) Rodriguez; (penalty missed) Losada; (penalty missed) Rodri |

=== Mid-season ===
| 5 January 2025 Friendly | Bayer Leverkusen | 2–0 | Rot-Weiß Oberhausen | Leverkusen |
| 12:00 CET (UTC+1) | Wirtz 47' (pen.); Schick 58' | Report | | Stadium: Ulrich-Haberland-Stadion; Attendance: 2,100; Referee: Nico Fuchs |

== Competitions ==
=== Overall record ===
| Competition | First match | Last match | Starting round | Final position | Record | | | | | | | |
| Competition | First match | Last match | Starting round | Final position | Pld | W | D | L | GF | GA | GD | Win % |
|---|---|---|---|---|---|---|---|---|---|---|---|---|
| Bundesliga | 23 August 2024 | 17 May 2025 | Matchday 1 | 2nd | 34 | 19 | 12 | 3 | 72 | 43 | +29 | 55.88 |
| DFB-Pokal | 28 August 2024 | 1 April 2025 | First round | Semi-finals | 5 | 4 | 0 | 1 | 9 | 4 | +5 | 80.00 |
| DFL-Supercup | 17 August 2024 | | Final | Winners | 1 | 0 | 1 | 0 | 2 | 2 | +0 | 0.00 |
| UEFA Champions League | 19 September 2024 | 11 March 2025 | League phase | Round of 16 | 10 | 5 | 1 | 4 | 15 | 12 | +3 | 50.00 |
| Total | | | | | 50 | 28 | 14 | 8 | 98 | 61 | +37 | 56.00 |

Source: Soccerway

=== Bundesliga ===
==== League table ====
| Pos | Team | Pld | W | D | L | GF | GA | GD | Pts | Qualification or relegation |
|---|---|---|---|---|---|---|---|---|---|---|
| 1 | Bayern Munich (C) | 34 | 25 | 7 | 2 | 99 | 32 | +67 | 82 | Qualification for the Champions League league phase |
| 2 | Bayer Leverkusen | 34 | 19 | 12 | 3 | 72 | 43 | +29 | 69 | Qualification for the Champions League league phase |
| 3 | Eintracht Frankfurt | 34 | 17 | 9 | 8 | 68 | 46 | +22 | 60 | Qualification for the Champions League league phase |
| 4 | Borussia Dortmund | 34 | 17 | 6 | 11 | 71 | 51 | +20 | 57 | Qualification for the Champions League league phase |
| 5 | SC Freiburg | 34 | 16 | 7 | 11 | 49 | 53 | −4 | 55 | Qualification for the Europa League league phase |

Source: Bundesliga
Rules for classification: 1) Points; 2) Goal difference; 3) Goals scored; 4) Head-to-head results; 5) Head-to-head away goals scored; 6) Away goals scored; 7) Play-off.
(Rules 4–6 only apply after home and away matches have been played between the tied teams.)
(C) Champions

==== Results summary ====
| Overall | | | | | | | | Home | | | | | | Away | | | | | |
| Pld | W | D | L | GF | GA | GD | Pts | W | D | L | GF | GA | GD | W | D | L | GF | GA | GD |
|---|---|---|---|---|---|---|---|---|---|---|---|---|---|---|---|---|---|---|---|
| 34 | 19 | 12 | 3 | 72 | 43 | +29 | 69 | 10 | 4 | 3 | 38 | 24 | +14 | 9 | 8 | 0 | 34 | 19 | +15 |

Source: DFB

==== Results by round ====
| Round | 1 | 2 | 3 | 4 | 5 | 6 | 7 | 8 | 9 | 10 | 11 | 12 | 13 | 14 | 15 | 16 | 17 | 18 | 19 | 20 | 21 | 22 | 23 | 24 | 25 | 26 | 27 | 28 | 29 | 30 | 31 | 32 | 33 | 34 |
|---|---|---|---|---|---|---|---|---|---|---|---|---|---|---|---|---|---|---|---|---|---|---|---|---|---|---|---|---|---|---|---|---|---|---|
| Ground | A | H | A | H | A | H | H | A | H | A | H | A | H | A | H | A | H | H | A | H | A | H | A | A | H | A | H | A | H | A | H | A | H | A |
| Result | W | L | W | W | D | D | W | D | D | D | W | W | W | W | W | W | W | W | D | W | D | D | W | W | L | W | W | W | D | D | W | D | L | D |
| Position | 4 | 8 | 5 | 2 | 4 | 5 | 4 | 3 | 4 | 4 | 4 | 3 | 3 | 2 | 2 | 2 | 2 | 2 | 2 | 2 | 2 | 2 | 2 | 2 | 2 | 2 | 2 | 2 | 2 | 2 | 2 | 2 | 2 | 2 |
| Points | 3 | 3 | 6 | 9 | 10 | 11 | 14 | 15 | 16 | 17 | 20 | 23 | 26 | 29 | 32 | 35 | 38 | 41 | 42 | 45 | 46 | 47 | 50 | 53 | 53 | 56 | 59 | 62 | 63 | 64 | 67 | 68 | 68 | 69 |

Source: DFB
A = Away; H = Home; W = Win; D = Draw; L = Loss

==== Matches ====
The match schedule was released on 4 July 2024.

| 23 August 2024 1 | Borussia Mönchengladbach | 2–3 | Bayer Leverkusen | Mönchengladbach |
| 20:30 CEST (UTC+2) | Elvedi 59'; Kleindienst 85'; Lainer (yellow card) 90+13' | Report | Xhaka 12'; Wirtz 38', 90+11', (penalty missed) 90+11' | Stadium: Borussia-Park; Attendance: 54,042; Referee: Robert Schröder |

| 31 August 2024 2 | Bayer Leverkusen | 2–3 | RB Leipzig | Leverkusen |
| 18:30 CEST (UTC+2) | Boniface (yellow card) 12'; Frimpong (yellow card) 18', (goal) 39'; Grimaldo 45'; Tapsoba (yellow card) 82' | Report | Kampl 45+7'; Openda 57', 80'; Klostermann (yellow card) 61' | Stadium: BayArena; Attendance: 29,615; Referee: Matthias Jöllenbeck |

| 14 September 2024 3 | TSG Hoffenheim | 1–4 | Bayer Leverkusen | Sinsheim |
| 15:30 CEST (UTC+2) | Prass (yellow card) 35'; Berisha 37'; Geiger (yellow card) 68'; Akpoguma (yellow card) 90+1' | Report | Terrier 17', (yellow card) 39'; Boniface 30', 75'; Andrich (yellow card) 51'; Wirtz 72' (pen.) | Stadium: Rhein-Neckar-Arena; Attendance: 30,150; Referee: Daniel Schlager |

| 22 September 2024 4 | Bayer Leverkusen | 4–3 | VfL Wolfsburg | Leverkusen |
| 15:30 CEST (UTC+2) | Wirtz 14'; Tah 32'; Belocian (yellow card) 36'; Grimaldo (yellow card) 45+5'; Hincapié 49'; Adli (yellow card) 51'; Frimpong (yellow card) 88'; Boniface 90+3' | Report | Mukiele 5' (o.g.); Bornauw 37'; Svanberg 45+1'; Tomás (yellow card) 50'; Zesiger (yellow card) 80'; Gerhardt (red card) 88'; Grabara (yellow card) 90+1'; Arnold (yellow card) 90+1'; Kamiński (yellow card) 90+7' | Stadium: BayArena; Attendance: 29,250; Referee: Sascha Stegemann |

| 28 September 2024 5 | Bayern Munich | 1–1 | Bayer Leverkusen | Munich |
| 18:30 CEST (UTC+2) | Upamecano (yellow card) 23'; Pavlović 39' | Report | Andrich 31', (yellow card) 32'; Wirtz (yellow card) 57'; Grimaldo (yellow card) 71' | Stadium: Allianz Arena; Attendance: 75,000; Referee: Felix Zwayer |

| 5 October 2024 6 | Bayer Leverkusen | 2–2 | Holstein Kiel | Leverkusen |
| 15:30 CEST (UTC+2) | Boniface 4'; Hofmann 8'; Frimpong (yellow card) 68'; Tah (yellow card) 90+6' | Report | Geschwill 45+5'; Knudsen (yellow card) 60'; Arp 69' (pen.); Weiner (yellow card) 90+2' | Stadium: BayArena; Attendance: 30,210; Referee: Robert Hartmann |

| 19 October 2024 7 | Bayer Leverkusen | 2–1 | Eintracht Frankfurt | Leverkusen |
| 15:30 CEST (UTC+2) | Boniface (penalty missed) 9', 72'; Andrich 25'; Grimaldo (yellow card) 67'; Hincapié (yellow card) 70' | Report | Marmoush 16' (pen.); Tuta (yellow card) 28' | Stadium: BayArena; Attendance: 30,210; Referee: Felix Brych |

| 26 October 2024 8 | Werder Bremen | 2–2 | Bayer Leverkusen | Bremen |
| 18:30 CEST (UTC+2) | Weiser (yellow card) 50'; Ducksch 74'; Schmid 90' | Report | Boniface 30'; Agu 77' (o.g.); Hincapié (yellow card) 88' | Stadium: Weserstadion; Attendance: 42,100; Referee: Florian Badstübner |

| 1 November 2024 9 | Bayer Leverkusen | 0–0 | VfB Stuttgart | Leverkusen |
| 20:30 CET (UTC+1) | Andrich (yellow card) 30'; Mukiele (yellow card) 42'; Xhaka (yellow card) 51' | Report | Karazor (yellow card) 52'; Millot (yellow card) 56'; Chase (yellow card) 68'; Stiller (yellow card) 69' | Stadium: BayArena; Attendance: 30,210; Referee: Daniel Siebert |

| 9 November 2024 10 | VfL Bochum | 1–1 | Bayer Leverkusen | Bochum |
| 15:30 CET (UTC+1) | Miyoshi 89' | Report | Schick 18', (yellow card) 77' | Stadium: Ruhrstadion; Attendance: 26,000; Referee: Robert Hartmann |

| 23 November 2024 11 | Bayer Leverkusen | 5–2 | 1. FC Heidenheim | Leverkusen |
| 15:30 CET (UTC+1) | Palacios 30'; Schick 32', 52', 71'; Xhaka 82' | Report | Dorsch 10'; Honsak 21' | Stadium: BayArena; Attendance: 29,103; Referee: Bastian Dankert |

| 30 November 2024 12 | Union Berlin | 1–2 | Bayer Leverkusen | Berlin |
| 15:30 CET (UTC+1) | Rothe (yellow card) 28'; Jeong 29'; Querfeld (yellow card) 63'; Trimmel (yellow card) 67'; Skov (yellow card) 90+3' | Report | Frimpong 2'; Andrich (yellow card) 21'; Schick 71'; Mukiele (yellow card) 90+4' | Stadium: Stadion An der Alten Försterei; Attendance: 22,012; Referee: Christian Dingert |

| 7 December 2024 13 | Bayer Leverkusen | 2–1 | FC St. Pauli | Leverkusen |
| 15:30 CET (UTC+1) | Wirtz 6'; Tah 21'; Hincapié (yellow card) 28' | Report | Guilavogui (yellow card) 37', (goal) 84'; Saliakas (yellow card) 75'; Dźwigała (yellow card) 90+3' | Stadium: BayArena; Attendance: 30,210; Referee: Matthias Jöllenbeck |

| 14 December 2024 14 | FC Augsburg | 0–2 | Bayer Leverkusen | Augsburg |
| 15:30 CET (UTC+1) | Onyeka (yellow card) 12'; Gouweleeuw (yellow card) 44'; Tietz (yellow card) 54' | Report | Terrier 14'; Wirtz 40' | Stadium: Augsburg Arena; Attendance: 29,310; Referee: Felix Zwayer |

| 21 December 2024 15 | Bayer Leverkusen | 5–1 | SC Freiburg | Leverkusen |
| 18:30 CET (UTC+1) | Wirtz (penalty missed) 33', 51'; Schick 45+1', 67', 74', 77', (yellow card) 78' | Report | Kübler (yellow card) 24'; Grifo 55'; Röhl (yellow card) 90+1' | Stadium: BayArena; Attendance: 30,210; Referee: Tobias Stieler |

| 10 January 2025 16 | Borussia Dortmund | 2–3 | Bayer Leverkusen | Dortmund |
| 20:30 CET (UTC+1) | Gittens 12'; Guirassy 79' (pen.); Nmecha (yellow card) 90+5' | Report | Tella 1'; Schick 8', 19', (yellow card) 45+3'; Tapsoba (yellow card) 78' | Stadium: Signal Iduna Park; Attendance: 81,365; Referee: Tobias Stieler |

| 14 January 2025 17 | Bayer Leverkusen | 1–0 | Mainz 05 | Leverkusen |
| 20:30 CET (UTC+1) | Grimaldo 48'; Mukiele (yellow card) 69'; Xhaka (yellow card) 87' | Report | Sieb (yellow card) 17'; Bell (yellow card) 51'; Caci (yellow card) 68' | Stadium: BayArena; Attendance: 30,210; Referee: Tobias Welz |

| 18 January 2025 18 | Bayer Leverkusen | 3–1 | Borussia Mönchengladbach | Leverkusen |
| 18:30 CET (UTC+1) | Wirtz 32', 62' (pen.); Schick 74' | Report | Čvančara (yellow card) 59'; Kleindienst 90+1'; Lainer (yellow card) 90+4' | Stadium: BayArena; Attendance: 30,210; Referee: Harm Osmers |

| 25 January 2025 19 | RB Leipzig | 2–2 | Bayer Leverkusen | Leipzig |
| 15:30 CET (UTC+1) | Raum 41'; Simons (yellow card) 79'; Tapsoba 85' (o.g.); Baumgartner (yellow card) 88' | Report | Schick 18'; García 36'; Andrich (yellow card) 40'; Tapsoba (yellow card) 42' | Stadium: Red Bull Arena; Attendance: 46,793; Referee: Bastian Dankert |

| 2 February 2025 20 | Bayer Leverkusen | 3–1 | TSG Hoffenheim | Leverkusen |
| 17:30 CET (UTC+1) | Boniface 15'; Frimpong 19'; Grimaldo (yellow card) 45+2' (yellow-red card) 61'; Schick 51'; Tah (yellow card) 79'; García (yellow card) 90+5' | Report | Geiger (yellow card) 34'; Orban 62'; Yardımcı (yellow card) 79'; Bischof (yellow card) 79' | Stadium: BayArena; Attendance: 29,278; Referee: Robin Braun |

| 8 February 2025 21 | VfL Wolfsburg | 0–0 | Bayer Leverkusen | Wolfsburg |
| 15:30 CET (UTC+1) | Mæhle (yellow card) 75'; Koulierakis (yellow card) 90+7' | Report | Boniface (yellow card) 15'; Andrich (yellow card) 37'; Mukiele (yellow card) 77' | Stadium: Volkswagen Arena; Attendance: 28,198; Referee: Sascha Stegemann |

| 15 February 2025 22 | Bayer Leverkusen | 0–0 | Bayern Munich | Leverkusen |
| 18:30 CET (UTC+1) | Hincapié (yellow card) 11'; Tapsoba (yellow card) 90+4' | Report | Itō (yellow card) 39'; Pavlović (yellow card) 53'; Upamecano (yellow card) 74' | Stadium: BayArena; Attendance: 30,210; Referee: Daniel Siebert |

| 22 February 2025 23 | Holstein Kiel | 0–2 | Bayer Leverkusen | Holstein |
| 15:30 CET (UTC+1) | Knudsen (yellow card) 12'; Zec (yellow card) 24'; Javorček (yellow card) 75'; Komenda (yellow card) 82' | Report | Schick 9'; Adli 45'; Hincapié (yellow card) 78' | Stadium: Holstein-Stadion; Attendance: 15,034; Referee: Daniel Schlager |

| 1 March 2025 24 | Eintracht Frankfurt | 1–4 | Bayer Leverkusen | Frankfurt |
| 18:30 CET (UTC+1) | Ekitike 37'; Skhiri (yellow card) 80' | Report | Tella 26'; Mukiele 29'; Schick 33'; García 62'; Xhaka (yellow card) 69' | Stadium: Deutsche Bank Park; Attendance: 58,000; Referee: Felix Zwayer |

| 8 March 2025 25 | Bayer Leverkusen | 0–2 | Werder Bremen | Leverkusen |
| 15:30 CET (UTC+1) | Schick (yellow card) 21'; Adli (yellow card) 88'; Palacios (yellow card) 90+8' | Report | Schmid 7'; Lynen (yellow card) 18'; Weiser (yellow card) 53'; Burke (yellow card) 69'; Stage (yellow card) 72'; Njinmah 90+4' | Stadium: BayArena; Attendance: 30,210; Referee: Tobias Welz |

| 16 March 2025 26 | VfB Stuttgart | 3–4 | Bayer Leverkusen | Stuttgart |
| 19:30 CET (UTC+1) | Demirović 15'; Karazor (yellow card) 27'; Woltemade 48', (yellow card) 64'; Jeltsch (yellow card) 51'; Xhaka 62' (o.g.) | Report | Frimpong 56'; Hincapié 68', (yellow card) 77'; Andrich (yellow card) 74'; Stiller 88' (o.g.); Schick 90+4' | Stadium: MHPArena; Attendance: 59,000; Referee: Daniel Siebert |

| 28 March 2025 27 | Bayer Leverkusen | 3–1 | VfL Bochum | Leverkusen |
| 20:30 CET (UTC+1) | García 20'; Boniface 60'; Adli 87' | Report | Passlack 26'; Boadu (yellow card) 87' | Stadium: BayArena; Attendance: 30,210; Referee: Sven Jablonski |

| 5 April 2025 28 | 1. FC Heidenheim | 0–1 | Bayer Leverkusen | Heidenheim |
| 15:30 CEST (UTC+2) | Schöppner (yellow card) 42' | Report | Buendía 90+1' | Stadium: Voith-Arena; Attendance: 15,000; Referee: Tobias Stieler |

| 12 April 2025 29 | Bayer Leverkusen | 0–0 | Union Berlin | Leverkusen |
| 15:30 CEST (UTC+2) | Wirtz (yellow card) 90+3'; Hofmann (yellow card) 90+3' | Report | Preu (yellow card) 83' | Stadium: BayArena; Attendance: 30,210; Referee: Bastian Dankert |

| 20 April 2025 30 | FC St. Pauli | 1–1 | Bayer Leverkusen | Hamburg |
| 19:30 CEST (UTC+2) | Boukhalfa 78'; Smith (yellow card) 90+1' | Report | Schick 32'; Hincapié (yellow card) 63'; Hradecky (yellow card) 64'; Frimpong (yellow card) 64'; Tella (yellow card) 77' | Stadium: Millerntor-Stadion; Attendance: 29,546; Referee: Sören Storks |

| 26 April 2025 31 | Bayer Leverkusen | 2–0 | FC Augsburg | Leverkusen |
| 15:30 CEST (UTC+2) | Schick 13'; Buendía 45+1' | Report | Zesiger (yellow card) 83' | Stadium: BayArena; Attendance: 29,563; Referee: Christian Dingert |

| 4 May 2025 32 | SC Freiburg | 2–2 | Bayer Leverkusen | Freiburg |
| 17:30 CEST (UTC+2) | Manzambi (yellow card) 27'; Eggestein 44'; Hincapié 49' (o.g.) | Report | Adli (yellow card) 66'; Wirtz 82'; Grimaldo (yellow card) 88'; Tah 90+3' | Stadium: Europa-Park Stadion; Attendance: 34,700; Referee: Daniel Siebert |

| 11 May 2025 33 | Bayer Leverkusen | 2–4 | Borussia Dortmund | Leverkusen |
| 15:30 CEST (UTC+2) | Frimpong 30'; Hofmann 90+2' | Report | Groß (yellow card) 23'; Brandt 33'; Ryerson 43'; Nmecha (yellow card) 45+2'; Adeyemi 73'; Guirassy 77' | Stadium: BayArena; Attendance: 30,210; Referee: Deniz Aytekin |

| 17 May 2025 34 | Mainz 05 | 2–2 | Bayer Leverkusen | Rhineland-Palatinate |
| 15:30 CEST (UTC+2) | Nebel 35'; Bell (yellow card) 40'; Burkardt 63' (pen.); Hanche-Olsen (yellow card) 81' | Report | Palacios (yellow card) 40'; García (yellow card) 45+7'; Schick 49' (pen.), 54'; Hincapié (yellow card) 59'; Arthur (yellow card) 68'; Tah (yellow card) 83'; Wirtz (yellow card) 87' | Stadium: Mewa Arena; Attendance: 33,305; Referee: Tobias Reichel |

=== DFB-Pokal ===
| 28 August 2024 First round | Carl Zeiss Jena | 0–1 | Bayer Leverkusen | Jena |
| 18:00 CEST (UTC+2) | Reddemann (yellow card) 18'; Schau (yellow card) 37' | Report | Andrich (yellow card) 18'; Hofmann 52' | Stadium: Ernst-Abbe-Sportfeld; Attendance: 15,000; Referee: Tobias Welz |

| 29 October 2024 Second round | Bayer Leverkusen | 3–0 | SV Elversberg | Leverkusen |
| 18:00 CET (UTC+1) | Schick 2', 9'; García 36'; Tapsoba (yellow card) 81' | Report | Pinckert (yellow card) 84' | Stadium: BayArena; Attendance: 29,787; Referee: Benjamin Brand |

| 3 December 2024 Round of 16 | Bayern Munich | 0–1 | Bayer Leverkusen | Munich |
| 20:45 CET (UTC+1) | Upamecano (yellow card) 13'; Neuer (red card) 17'; Goretzka (yellow card) 52' | Report | Tapsoba (yellow card) 13'; Wirtz (yellow card) 22'; Tella 69'; Kovář (yellow card) 78' | Stadium: Allianz Arena; Attendance: 75,000; Referee: Harm Osmers |

| 5 February 2025 Quarter-finals | Bayer Leverkusen | 3–2 (a.e.t.) | 1. FC Köln | Leverkusen |
| 20:45 CET (UTC+1) | Schick 61', 90+6'; Xhaka (yellow card) 70'; Boniface 98'; Wirtz (yellow card) 104'; García (yellow card) 119' | Report | Heintz (yellow card) 19'; Downs 45+10'; Maina 54'; Hübers (yellow card) 64'; Thielmann (yellow card) 90+5' | Stadium: BayArena; Attendance: 30,210; Referee: Frank Willenborg |

| 1 April 2025 Semi-finals | Arminia Bielefeld | 2–1 | Bayer Leverkusen | Bielefeld |
| 20:45 CEST (UTC+2) | Wörl 20'; Großer 45+3'; Grodowski (yellow card) 63'; Schreck (yellow card) 64'; Russo (yellow card) 72' | Report | Tah 17'; Mukiele (yellow card) 41'; Hincapié (yellow card) 51'; Boniface (yellow card) 60'; Tella (yellow card) 87'; Grimaldo (yellow card) 90+1' | Stadium: Schüco-Arena; Attendance: 26,601; Referee: Harm Osmers |

=== DFL-Supercup ===
Bayer Leverkusen secured their spot by winning both the Bundesliga and the domestic cup.

| 17 August 2024 Final | Bayer Leverkusen | 2–2 (4–3 p) | VfB Stuttgart | Leverkusen |
| 20:30 CEST (UTC+2) | Boniface 11', (yellow card) 80'; Terrier (red card) 37'; Xhaka (yellow card) 61'; Tapsoba (yellow card) 71'; Wirtz (yellow card) 85'; Frimpong (yellow card) 86'; Schick 88' | Report | Millot 15', (yellow card) 78'; Stiller (yellow card) 44'; Undav 63'; Demirović (yellow card) 71'; Stenzel (yellow card) 82'; Chabot (yellow card) 86' | Stadium: BayArena; Attendance: 30,210; Referee: Tobias Stieler |
| | Penalties |
| | Schick (penalty scored); Grimaldo (penalty scored); García (penalty scored); Tapsoba (penalty scored) | | (penalty scored) Millot; (penalty scored) Demirović; (penalty missed) Krätzig; (penalty scored) Undav; (penalty missed) Silas |

=== UEFA Champions League ===
==== League phase ====
The draw for the league phase was held on 29 August 2024.

| Pos | Team | Pld | W | D | L | GF | GA | GD | Pts | Qualification |
|---|---|---|---|---|---|---|---|---|---|---|
| 4 | (Italian Football Federation) Inter Milan | 8 | 6 | 1 | 1 | 11 | 1 | +10 | 19 | Advance to round of 16 (seeded) |
| 5 | (Royal Spanish Football Federation) Atlético Madrid | 8 | 6 | 0 | 2 | 20 | 12 | +8 | 18 | Advance to round of 16 (seeded) |
| 6 | (German Football Association) Bayer Leverkusen | 8 | 5 | 1 | 2 | 15 | 7 | +8 | 16 | Advance to round of 16 (seeded) |
| 7 | (French Football Federation) Lille | 8 | 5 | 1 | 2 | 17 | 10 | +7 | 16 | Advance to round of 16 (seeded) |
| 8 | (The Football Association) Aston Villa | 8 | 5 | 1 | 2 | 13 | 6 | +7 | 16 | Advance to round of 16 (seeded) |

Source: UEFA
Rules for classification: League phase tiebreakers

| Round | 1 | 2 | 3 | 4 | 5 | 6 | 7 | 8 |
|---|---|---|---|---|---|---|---|---|
| Ground | A | H | A | A | H | H | A | H |
| Result | W | W | D | L | W | W | L | W |
| Position | 3 | 4 | 6 | 13 | 6 | 4 | 8 | 6 |
| Points | 3 | 6 | 7 | 7 | 10 | 13 | 13 | 16 |

Source: UEFA
A = Away; H = Home; W = Win; D = Draw; L = Loss

| 19 September 2024 1 | Feyenoord (Netherlands) | 0–4 | (Germany) Bayer Leverkusen | Rotterdam, Netherlands |
| 18:45 CEST (UTC+2) | Trauner (yellow card) 44' | Report | Wirtz 5', 36'; Grimaldo 30'; Wellenreuther 45' (o.g.) | Stadium: De Kuip; Attendance: 42,297; Referee: Davide Massa (Italy) |

| 1 October 2024 2 | Bayer Leverkusen (Germany) | 1–0 | (Italy) Milan | Leverkusen |
| 21:00 CEST (UTC+2) | García (yellow card) 8'; Boniface 51'; Frimpong (yellow card) 74' | Report | Morata (yellow card) 84'; Chukwueze (yellow card) 90+4'; Tomori (yellow card) 90+5' | Stadium: BayArena; Attendance: 30,210; Referee: Sandro Schärer (Switzerland) |

| 23 October 2024 3 | Brest (France) | 1–1 | (Germany) Bayer Leverkusen | Guingamp, France |
| 18:45 CEST (UTC+2) | Lees-Melou 39', (yellow card) 90+5'; Salah (yellow card) 84' | Report | Wirtz 24', (yellow card) 74'; Frimpong (yellow card) 72'; Tah (yellow card) 90+2'; Xhaka (yellow card) 90+8' | Stadium: Stade de Roudourou; Attendance: 15,510; Referee: Ivan Kružliak (Slovakia) |
Note: The match was played at Stade de Roudourou in Guingamp, instead of Brest's regular stadium, Stade Francis-Le Blé in Brest, which did not meet UEFA requirements.

| 5 November 2024 4 | Liverpool (England) | 4–0 | (Germany) Bayer Leverkusen | Liverpool, England |
| 20:00 GMT (UTC+0) | Díaz 61', 83', 90+2'; Gakpo 63' | Report | García (yellow card) 26'; Hradecky (yellow card) 60' | Stadium: Anfield; Attendance: 59,790; Referee: Danny Makkelie (Netherlands) |

| 26 November 2024 5 | Bayer Leverkusen (Germany) | 5–0 | (Austria) Red Bull Salzburg | Leverkusen |
| 21:00 CET (UTC+1) | Wirtz 8' (pen.), 30'; Grimaldo 11'; Schick 61'; Andrich (yellow card) 65'; García 72' | Report | Yeo (yellow card) 58' | Stadium: BayArena; Attendance: 29,211; Referee: Mykola Balakin (Ukraine) |

| 10 December 2024 6 | Bayer Leverkusen (Germany) | 1–0 | (Italy) Inter Milan | Leverkusen |
| 21:00 CET (UTC+1) | Mukiele 90' | Report | Çalhanoğlu (yellow card) 25'; Carlos Augusto (yellow card) 27' | Stadium: BayArena; Attendance: 30,210; Referee: Slavko Vinčić (Slovenia) |

| 21 January 2025 7 | Atlético Madrid (Spain) | 2–1 | (Germany) Bayer Leverkusen | Madrid, Spain |
| 21:00 CET (UTC+1) | Barrios (red card) 23'; Giménez (yellow card) 45+2'; Alvarez 52', 90'; Simeone (yellow card) 66' | Report | Wirtz (yellow card) 44'; Hincapié 45+1', (yellow card) 45+4' (yellow-red card) 76'; Tella (yellow card) 45+2' | Stadium: Metropolitano Stadium; Attendance: 66,280; Referee: Davide Massa (Italy) |

| 29 January 2025 8 | Bayer Leverkusen (Germany) | 2–0 | (Czech Republic) Sparta Prague | Leverkusen |
| 21:00 CET (UTC+1) | Wirtz 32'; Tella 64'; Xhaka (yellow card) 66'; Andrich (yellow card) 90+2' | Report | Birmančević (yellow card) 36'; Olatunji (yellow card) 63' | Stadium: BayArena; Attendance: 30,210; Referee: Georgi Kabakov (Bulgaria) |

==== Knockout phase ====
===== Round of 16 =====
The draw for the round of 16 was held on 21 February 2025.

| 5 March 2025 First leg | Bayern Munich (Germany) | 3–0 | (Germany) Bayer Leverkusen | Munich |
| 21:00 CET (UTC+1) | Kane 9', 75' (pen.); Laimer (yellow card) 39'; Goretzka (yellow card) 51'; Musiala 54' | Report | Mukiele (yellow card) 39' (yellow-red card) 62'; Tapsoba (yellow card) 73'; Tah (yellow card) 74' | Stadium: Allianz Arena; Attendance: 75,000; Referee: Michael Oliver (England) |

| 11 March 2025 Second leg | Bayer Leverkusen (Germany) | 0–2 (0–5 agg.) | (Germany) Bayern Munich | Leverkusen |
| 21:00 CET (UTC+1) | Hermoso (yellow card) 31'; Xhaka (yellow card) 51'; Schick (yellow card) 70'; Buendía (yellow card) 86' | Report | Laimer (yellow card) 8'; Coman (yellow card) 10'; Kane 52', (yellow card) 82'; Davies 71' | Stadium: BayArena; Attendance: 30,210; Referee: Slavko Vinčić (Slovenia) |

== Statistics ==
=== Appearances and goals ===
| No. | Pos | Nat | Player | Total | | Bundesliga | | DFB-Pokal | | DFL-Supercup | | Champions League | |
| No. | Pos | Nat | Player | Apps | Goals | Apps | Goals | Apps | Goals | Apps | Goals | Apps | Goals |
Goalkeepers
| 1 | GK | (Finland) FIN | Lukas Hradecky | 35 | 0 | 29 | 0 | 1 | 0 | 1 | 0 | 4 | 0 |
| 17 | GK | (Czech Republic) CZE | Matěj Kovář | 15 | 0 | 5 | 0 | 4 | 0 | 0 | 0 | 6 | 0 |
| 36 | GK | (Germany) GER | Niklas Lomb | 0 | 0 | 0 | 0 | 0 | 0 | 0 | 0 | 0 | 0 |
Defenders
| 3 | DF | (Ecuador) ECU | Piero Hincapié | 18 | 1 | 10+2 | 1 | 0 | 0 | 1 | 0 | 5 | 0 |
| 4 | DF | (Germany) GER | Jonathan Tah | 20 | 1 | 12 | 1 | 2 | 0 | 0+1 | 0 | 5 | 0 |
| 5 | DF | (Spain) ESP | Mario Hermoso | 0 | 0 | 0 | 0 | 0 | 0 | 0 | 0 | 0 | 0 |
| 12 | DF | (Burkina Faso) BFA | Edmond Tapsoba | 20 | 0 | 12 | 0 | 2 | 0 | 1 | 0 | 4+1 | 0 |
| 13 | DF | (Brazil) BRA | Arthur | 4 | 0 | 0+1 | 0 | 2 | 0 | 0 | 0 | 0+1 | 0 |
| 20 | DF | (Spain) ESP | Álex Grimaldo | 20 | 3 | 12 | 1 | 0+2 | 0 | 0+1 | 0 | 5 | 2 |
| 23 | DF | (France) FRA | Nordi Mukiele | 6 | 0 | 2+2 | 0 | 1 | 0 | 0 | 0 | 1 | 0 |
| 30 | DF | (Netherlands) NED | Jeremie Frimpong | 19 | 2 | 10+2 | 2 | 0+1 | 0 | 0+1 | 0 | 4+1 | 0 |
| 33 | DF | (Togo) TOG | Sadik Fofana | 0 | 0 | 0 | 0 | 0 | 0 | 0 | 0 | 0 | 0 |
| 44 | DF | (France) FRA | Jeanuël Belocian | 6 | 0 | 1+1 | 0 | 1 | 0 | 1 | 0 | 0+2 | 0 |
Midfielders
| 7 | MF | (Germany) GER | Jonas Hofmann | 8 | 2 | 3+1 | 1 | 2 | 1 | 0 | 0 | 1+1 | 0 |
| 8 | MF | (Germany) GER | Robert Andrich | 16 | 2 | 9+1 | 2 | 1 | 0 | 1 | 0 | 2+2 | 0 |
| 11 | MF | (France) FRA | Martin Terrier | 13 | 1 | 5+4 | 1 | 0 | 0 | 1 | 0 | 1+2 | 0 |
| 16 | MF | (Argentina) ARG | Emiliano Buendía | 0 | 0 | 0 | 0 | 0 | 0 | 0 | 0 | 0 | 0 |
| 19 | MF | (Nigeria) NGR | Nathan Tella | 15 | 0 | 1+7 | 0 | 2 | 0 | 1 | 0 | 1+3 | 0 |
| 21 | MF | (Morocco) MAR | Amine Adli | 12 | 0 | 2+5 | 0 | 1 | 0 | 1 | 0 | 1+2 | 0 |
| 24 | MF | (Spain) ESP | Aleix García | 18 | 2 | 4+6 | 0 | 2 | 1 | 1 | 0 | 3+2 | 1 |
| 25 | MF | (Argentina) ARG | Exequiel Palacios | 12 | 1 | 2+4 | 1 | 1 | 0 | 0 | 0 | 3+2 | 0 |
| 34 | MF | (Switzerland) SUI | Granit Xhaka | 20 | 2 | 12 | 2 | 1+1 | 0 | 1 | 0 | 4+1 | 0 |
Forwards
| 10 | FW | (Germany) GER | Florian Wirtz | 20 | 9 | 10+2 | 4 | 0+2 | 0 | 0+1 | 0 | 5 | 5 |
| 14 | FW | (Czech Republic) CZE | Patrik Schick | 17 | 9 | 4+6 | 5 | 2 | 2 | 0+1 | 1 | 2+2 | 1 |
| 22 | FW | (Nigeria) NGR | Victor Boniface | 15 | 8 | 8+2 | 6 | 0+1 | 0 | 1 | 1 | 3 | 1 |
| 29 | FW | (Ukraine) UKR | Artem Stepanov | 1 | 0 | 0 | 0 | 0 | 0 | 0 | 0 | 0+1 | 0 |
| 40 | FW | (Germany) GER | Francis Onyeka | 2 | 0 | 0 | 0 | 0+1 | 0 | 0 | 0 | 0+1 | 0 |
Players transferred out during the season

Last updated: 30 November 2024
Source: Competitions

=== Goalscorers ===
| Position | Player | Bundesliga | DFB-Pokal | DFL-Supercup | Champions League | Total |
|---|---|---|---|---|---|---|
| 1 | (Czech Republic) Patrik Schick | 21 | 4 | 1 | 1 | 27 |
| 2 | (Germany) Florian Wirtz | 10 | 0 | 0 | 6 | 16 |
| 3 | (Nigeria) Victor Boniface | 8 | 1 | 1 | 1 | 11 |
| 4 | (Netherlands) Jeremie Frimpong | 5 | 0 | 0 | 0 | 5 |
| 4 | (Spain) Álex Grimaldo | 2 | 0 | 0 | 2 | 4 |
| 6 | (Germany) Robert Andrich | 2 | 0 | 0 | 0 | 2 |
| 6 | (Ecuador) Piero Hincapié | 1 | 0 | 0 | 1 | 2 |
| 6 | (Germany) Jonas Hofmann | 1 | 1 | 0 | 0 | 2 |
| 6 | (Germany) Jonathan Tah | 2 | 0 | 0 | 0 | 2 |
| 6 | (Germany) Martin Terrier | 2 | 0 | 0 | 0 | 2 |
| 6 | (Switzerland) Granit Xhaka | 2 | 0 | 0 | 0 | 2 |
| Own goals | | 0 | 0 | 0 | 1 | 0 |
| Total | | 44 | 6 | 2 | 12 | 64 |
