= Florian Wirtz =

German footballer (born 2003)

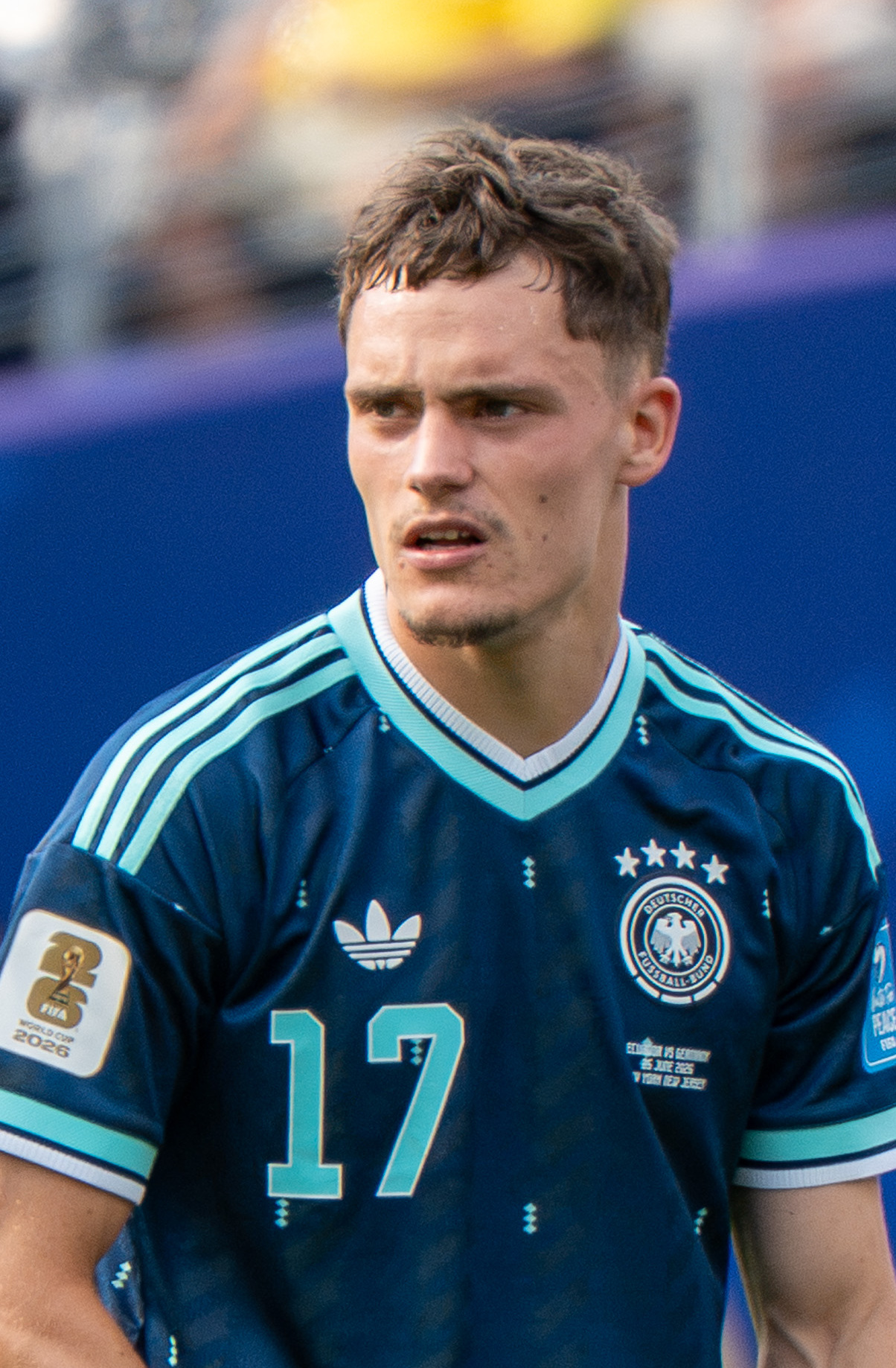
- Wirtz with Germany in 2026

Personal information
- Full name: Florian Richard Wirtz
- Date of birth: 3 May 2003 (age 23)
- Place of birth: Pulheim, Germany
- Height: 1.76 m (5 ft 9 in)
- Positions: Attacking midfielder; left midfielder

Team information
- Current team: Liverpool
- Number: 7

Youth career
- 2008–2010: SV Grün-Weiß Brauweiler
- 2010–2020: 1. FC Köln
- 2020: Bayer Leverkusen

Senior career*
Years	Team	Apps	(Gls)
2020–2025	Bayer Leverkusen	140	(35)
2025–	Liverpool	44	(7)

International career^{‡}
2018	Germany U15	1	(0)
2018–2019	Germany U16	5	(0)
2019–2020	Germany U17	4	(0)
2020–2021	Germany U21	6	(2)
2021–	Germany	50	(15)
Medal record
Men's Football
Representing Germany
UEFA European Under-21 Championship
Winner	2021 Hungary–Slovenia
- * Club domestic league appearances and goals as of 18:26, 22 November 2026 (UTC) ‡ National team caps and goals as of 21:40, 16 November 2026 (UTC)

Florian Richard Wirtz (Note: German pronunciation: [ˈfloːʁi̯aːn ˈvɪʁts]) (born 3 May 2003) is a German professional footballer who plays as an attacking midfielder or left midfielder for Premier League club Liverpool and the Germany national team.

Wirtz rose through the youth system at 1. FC Köln before moving to Bayer Leverkusen in 2020. He made his first team debut at the age of 17, becoming the youngest scorer in Bundesliga history. He played a pivotal role in Leverkusen's unbeaten domestic double in the 2023–24 season, earning Bundesliga Player of the Season honours and recording 18 goals in 49 appearances. In June 2025, Wirtz joined Liverpool for approximately £100 million plus bonuses, setting a then club-record fee and a new Premier League transfer record.

Internationally, Wirtz debuted for Germany in September 2021 after representing the country at various youth levels. He later became the youngest ever goalscorer for Germany in the history of the European Championships after he scored a goal against Scotland at UEFA Euro 2024. He also represented Germany at the 2026 FIFA World Cup.

== Early life ==
Wirtz was born on 3 May 2003 in the Brauweiler district of Pulheim, North Rhine-Westphalia.

== Club career ==
=== Early career ===
Regarded as a big talent in German football, Wirtz joined the youth team of 1. FC Köln in 2010, where he remained until he was signed by Bayer Leverkusen in January 2020. His transfer to Leverkusen was controversial, as Köln felt that Leverkusen violated a gentleman's agreement between the two clubs in signing Wirtz.

=== Bayer Leverkusen ===
==== 2020: Professional debut ====
After impressing for the under-17 team, Wirtz made his senior professional debut for Leverkusen in the Bundesliga on 18 May 2020, starting in an away match against Werder Bremen. In doing so, he overtook Kai Havertz as Leverkusen's youngest player in the league, at the age of 17 years and 15 days. On 6 June, Wirtz scored his first goal for Leverkusen in the 89th minute of their 4–2 home loss against Bayern Munich, making Wirtz the youngest goalscorer in Bundesliga history at the age of 17 years and 34 days. This record would later be surpassed by Youssoufa Moukoko less than a year later, aged 16 years and 28 days. On 22 October, he scored his first goal in European competitions in a 6–2 win over Nice during the 2020–21 Europa League.

==== 2020–23: Contract extension and long-term injury ====
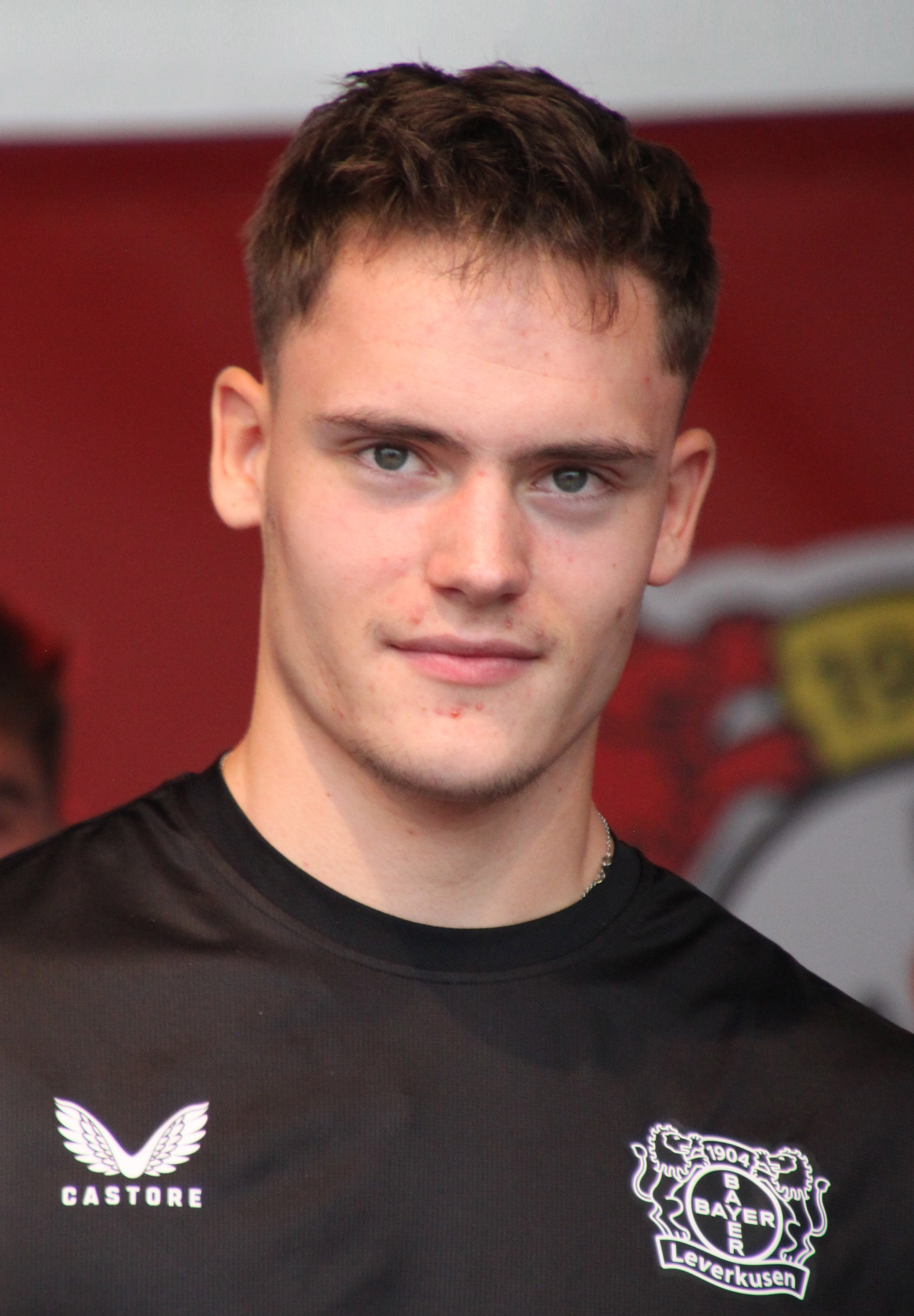
Wirtz with Bayer Leverkusen in 2022

Wirtz signed a contract extension with the club on 23 December 2020, extending his deal until 2023. On 19 January 2021, he scored the winner in the 80th minute of Leverkusen's 2–1 home victory over Borussia Dortmund. Wirtz scored his fifth career Bundesliga goal in a 5–2 win against VfB Stuttgart on 6 February, becoming the first player in league history to reach this benchmark before turning eighteen years old. He extended his contract until 2026 on 3 May 2021, the day of his 18th birthday. On 28 November 2021, Wirtz netted his fifth Bundesliga goal of the season in a 3–1 win against RB Leipzig to become the first player under the age of 19 to score more than ten Bundesliga goals. On 15 December, in a match against TSG Hoffenheim, he became the youngest player to reach 50 Bundesliga appearances at the age of 18 years and 223 days.

On 13 March 2022, Wirtz tore his anterior cruciate ligament in a 1–0 defeat against 1. FC Köln, resulting in him missing the rest of the 2021–22 Bundesliga season. On 22 January 2023, he played his first competitive match in ten months, coming off the bench in a 3–2 away win over Borussia Mönchengladbach.

==== 2023–24: Domestic double and player of the season award ====
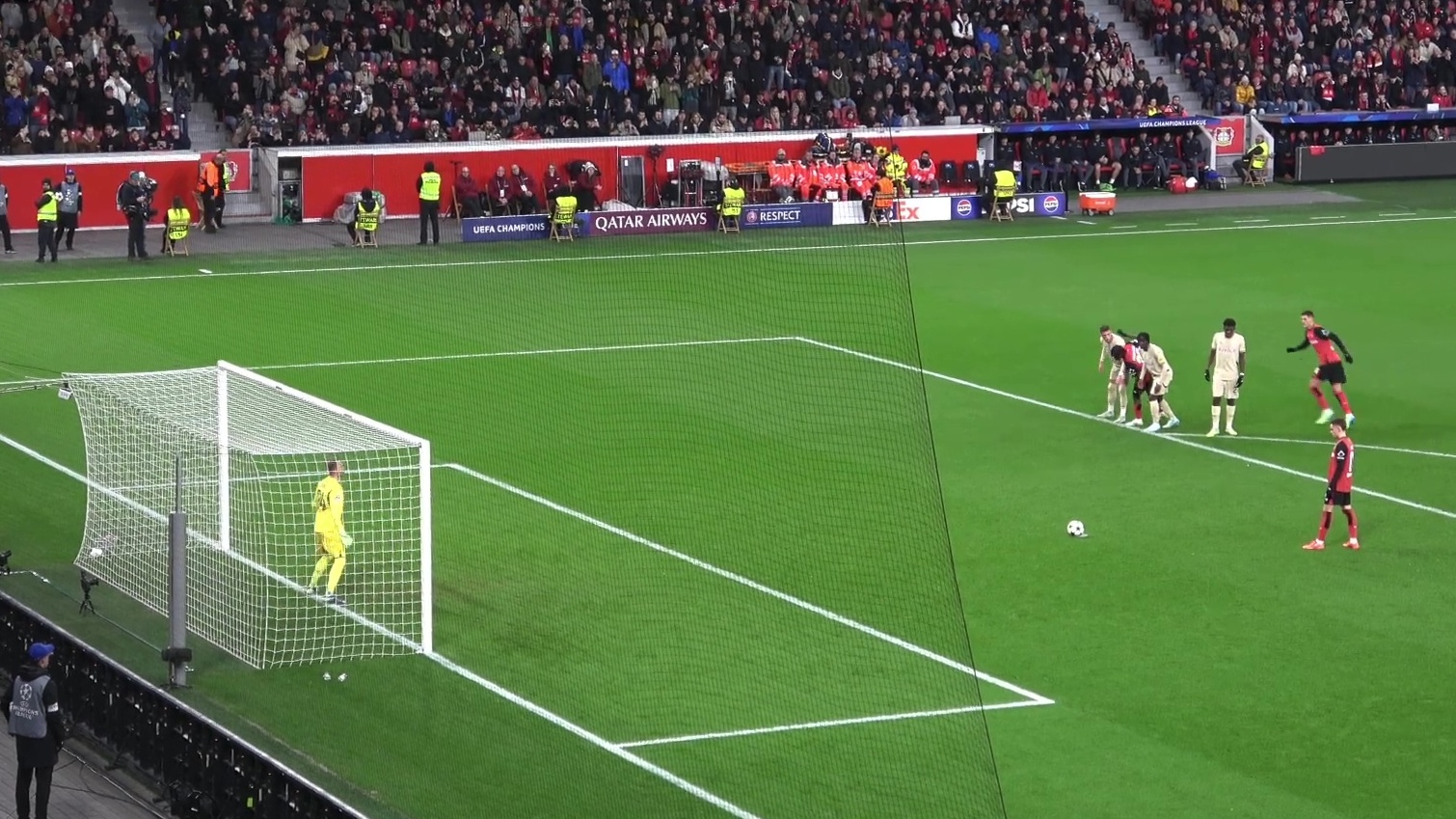
Wirtz taking a penalty in a UEFA Champions League game against Red Bull Salzburg in November 2024

On 26 October 2023, he scored a goal and provided a hat-trick of assists in a 5–1 victory over Qarabağ during the 2023–24 Europa League group stage. On 14 April 2024, Wirtz scored his first career hat-trick, leading his team to a historic 5–0 title-clinching win over Werder Bremen, which gave Bayer their first German championship. By the end of the season, he would win the DFB-Pokal final following a 1–0 victory over Kaiserslautern as well as reach the final of the UEFA Europa League. With twenty-two goal involvements throughout the season for his club in Bundesliga, he was voted player of the season.

==== 2024–25: DFL-Supercup title, Champions League debut and departure ====
In the beginning of the 2024–25 season, Wirtz would win the DFL-Supercup with his team against VfB Stuttgart on penalties. He made his UEFA Champions League debut on the first matchday in a 4–0 away victory over Feyenoord, in which he scored a first-half brace and was named man of the match. Wirtz would go on to achieve this honour in four further matches against AC Milan, Brest, Red Bull Salzburg and Sparta Prague, three of which he scored in; his five man of the match awards was more than any other player that season. He also became the first German player to score five goals in five Champions League matches. His side would eventually be knocked out in the round of 16 by fellow Bundesliga side Bayern Munich 5–0 on aggregate, of which he missed the second leg match due to injury.

=== Liverpool ===
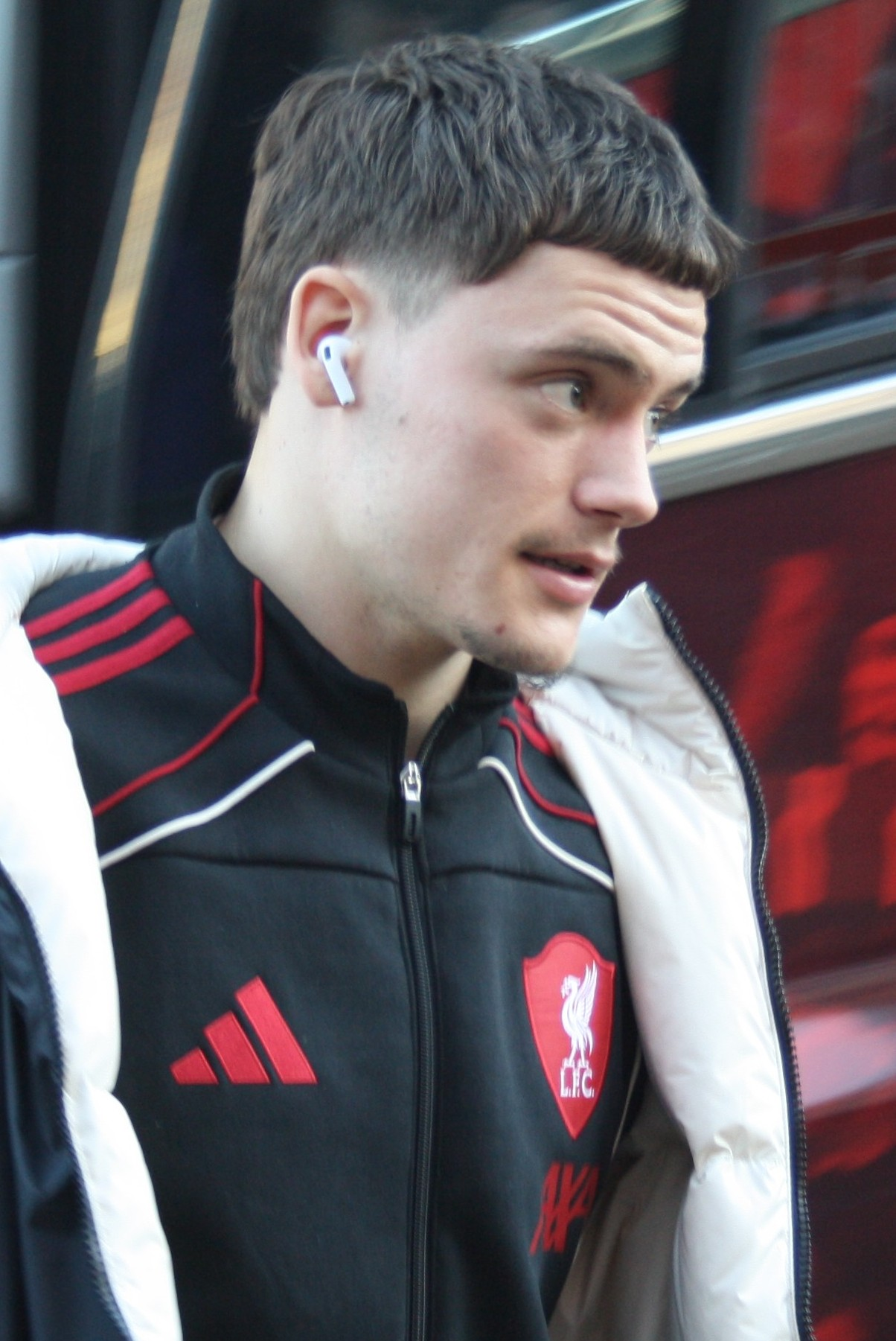
Wirtz with Liverpool in 2026

On 20 June 2025, Wirtz joined Premier League club Liverpool on a long-term contract for a reported fee of depending on the source £100 million (€117.5 million) or £107 million (€125 million), with £16 million (€18.8 million) or €25 million in bonuses. Wirtz became the sixth most expensive footballer of all time, and also became the largest transfer in the history of the Bundesliga, replacing Ousmane Dembélé as record holder. His transfer represented a club record fee for Liverpool, succeeding Darwin Núñez's move from Benfica in 2022, as well as a potential British record transfer, should the add-ons be activated.

Wirtz made his debut for Liverpool on 10 August in the FA Community Shield against Crystal Palace, recording an assist in a 2–2 draw in normal time, though his side would eventually lose 3–2 on penalties. On 15 August, he made his league debut for Liverpool in a late 4–2 win over Bournemouth. Later that year, on 22 October, he provided his first two assists in a 5–1 away victory over Eintracht Frankfurt in the Champions League. Two months later, on 20 December, he recorded his first Premier League assist in a 2–1 away win over Tottenham Hotspur. A week later, on 27 December, he scored his first goal for the club in a 2–1 victory over Wolverhampton Wanderers.

== International career ==
=== Youth ===
Wirtz represented Germany at under-15, under-16, under-17 and under-21 levels. While playing for the U21 side at the 2021 UEFA European Under-21 Championship, he scored twice in a 2–1 semi-final victory against the Netherlands as Germany went on to win the tournament.

=== Senior ===
==== 2020–24: Debut and first goals ====
In March 2021, Wirtz received his first call up to the German senior team from manager Joachim Löw for 2022 FIFA World Cup qualifying matches against Iceland, Romania and North Macedonia. He later made his debut on 2 September in another World Cup qualifier against Liechtenstein, coming on as a substitute for Joshua Kimmich in a 2–0 away victory for the Germans.

In May 2022, coach Hansi Flick expressed his willingness to name Wirtz in the final squad for the 2022 FIFA World Cup, though he ultimately missed the tournament due to his ACL injury.

On 23 March 2024, he scored his first senior goal for Germany seven seconds into a friendly match against France, a 2–0 away victory, breaking Lukas Podolski's record, also becoming the second fastest goalscorer in international football history behind Austrian footballer Christoph Baumgartner, who scored a goal in just six seconds in another friendly match against Slovakia on the same day.

==== 2024–25: Euros and Nations League ====
On 7 June 2024, Wirtz was named in Germany's squad for UEFA Euro 2024. On 14 June, he netted the opener of the tournament in a 5–1 victory over Scotland, becoming the youngest German player to score in the European Championship, aged 21 years and 42 days, breaking the previous record set by Kai Havertz. In the quarter-final against Spain, Wirtz replaced Leroy Sané at half-time and scored an 89th-minute equalising goal which took the match to extra time. Spain went on to win 2–1 with a 119th-minute goal, knocking Germany out of the tournament.

On 7 September 2024, Wirtz made his UEFA Nations League debut in their opening group match against Hungary, scoring a goal and providing an assist in a 5–0 victory. On matchday five of the competition, he netted the first free kick of his professional career as he scored a brace in a 7–0 win over Bosnia and Herzegovina. He would eventually top the group stage with his country and qualify for the quarter-finals against Italy, which he missed due to injury, but which Germany went on to win. In the semi-finals, he scored to give Germany the lead against Portugal, though his side were eventually eliminated from the tournament following a 2–1 defeat.

==== 2025–26: World Cup season ====
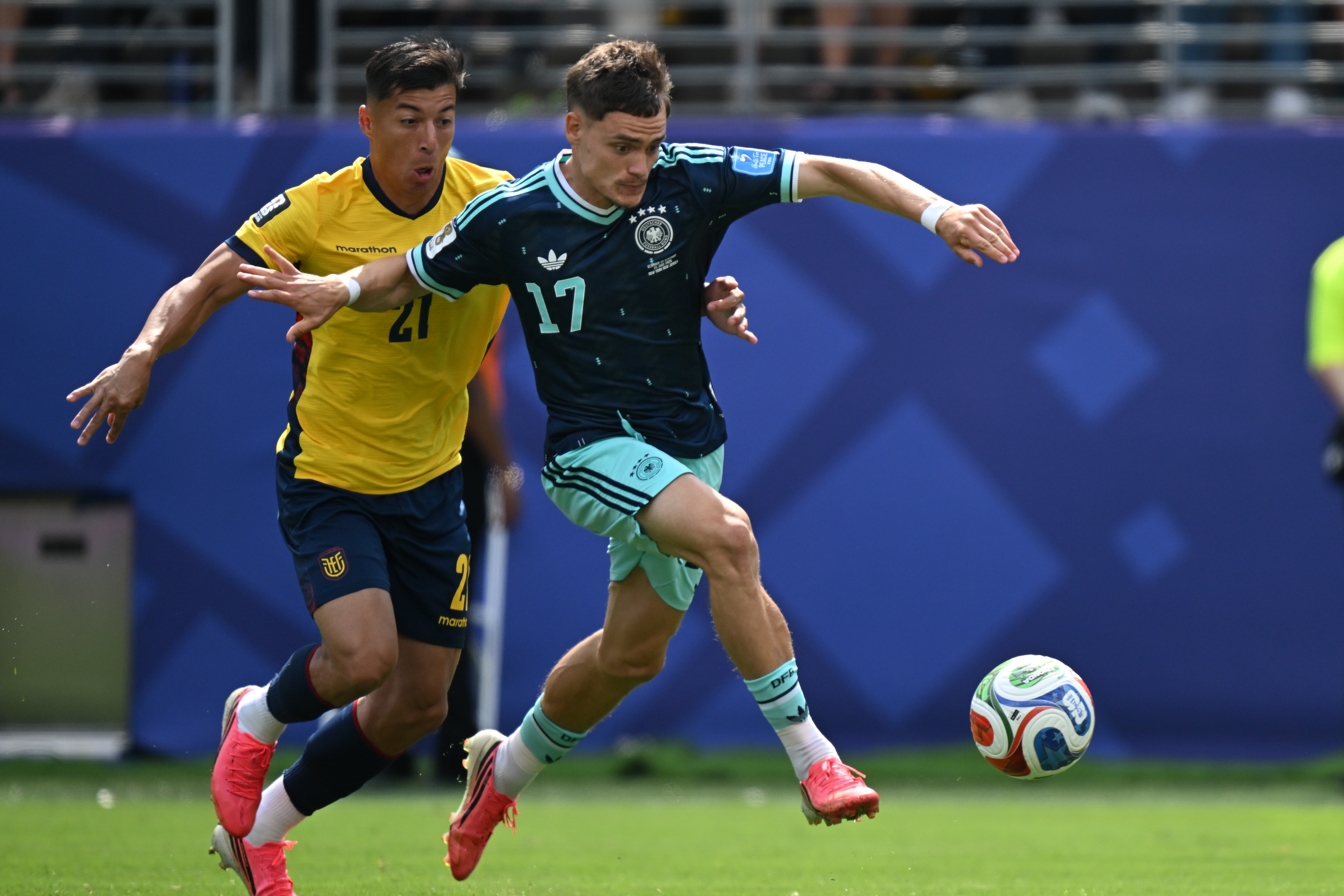
Wirtz playing against Ecuador at the 2026 FIFA World Cup

After failing to secure bronze at the Nations League, Wirtz and his country would qualify themselves for the 2026 FIFA World Cup in USA, Mexico and Canada. During the qualifiers in late 2025, Wirtz would score a freekick and assist two further goals in six matches.

On 27 March 2026, he'd secure his country the first victory of the year in a pre-tournament friendly in Basel against Switzerland, with the match ending 3–4. Having been involved in all goals, his two goals and assists were marked by technical quality and composure. On 21 May 2026, he was selected in Germany’s 26-man squad for the 2026 FIFA World Cup.

== Player profile ==
Wirtz is a versatile attacking midfielder, although he can also play wide as an inverted winger. He was also sometimes used as a forward or a false nine by Xabi Alonso at Bayer Leverkusen. His outstanding technique helps him to quickly find solutions to set up his teammates while simultaneously having an offensive drive himself. He combines this with a good sense of space and the right pass or cross, but also poses a potent threat himself. Wirtz has been noted particularly for his off-the-ball movement and high work rate, covering a lot of ground and playing in many areas of the pitch.

== Personal life ==
Wirtz's parents are his agents; his father, Hans-Joachim, is also chairman of Grün-Weiß Brauweiler, the club that Wirtz played for as a child before joining Köln. Wirtz has nine siblings, four brothers and five sisters. His older sister Juliane is a professional footballer as well.

Wirtz has been dating model and influencer Aaliyah Cloßen Mohamed since about 2022. The relationship has generated minor controversy given the fact that Cloßen Mohamed is Muslim, while Wirtz is not.

== Career statistics ==
=== Club ===
As of match played 22 November 2026

Appearances and goals by club, season and competition
Club	Season	League			National cup (Note: Includes DFB-Pokal, FA Cup)		League cup (Note: Includes EFL Cup)		Europe		Other		Total	
Club	Season	Division	Apps	Goals	Apps	Goals	Apps	Goals	Apps	Goals	Apps	Goals	Apps	Goals
Bayer Leverkusen	2019–20	Bundesliga	7	1	1	0	—		1 (Note: Appearance(s) in UEFA Europa League)	0	—		9	1
Bayer Leverkusen	2020–21	Bundesliga	29	5	2	1	—		7	2	—		38	8
Bayer Leverkusen	2021–22	Bundesliga	24	7	1	0	—		6	3	—		31	10
Bayer Leverkusen	2022–23	Bundesliga	17	1	0	0	—		8	3	—		25	4
Bayer Leverkusen	2023–24	Bundesliga	32	11	6	3	—		11	4	—		49	18
Bayer Leverkusen	2024–25	Bundesliga	31	10	4	0	—		9 (Note: Appearances in UEFA Champions League)	6	1 (Note: Appearance in DFL-Supercup)	0	45	16
Bayer Leverkusen	Total		140	35	14	4	—		42	18	1	0	197	57
Liverpool	2025–26	Premier League	33	5	4	1	0	0	11	1	1 (Note: Appearance in FA Community Shield)	0	49	7
Liverpool	2026–27	Premier League	11	2	0	0	1	0	4	1	—		16	3
Liverpool	Total		44	7	4	1	1	0	15	2	1	0	65	10
Career total			184	42	18	5	1	0	57	20	2	0	262	67

=== International ===
As of match played 16 November 2026

Appearances and goals by national team and year
National team	Year	Apps	Goals
Germany
Germany	2021	4	0
Germany	2023	10	0
Germany	2024	15	6
Germany	2025	8	2
Germany	2026	13	7
Total		50	15

As of match played 16 November 2026
Scores and results list Germany's goal tally first.

List of international goals scored by Florian Wirtz
No.	Date	Venue	Cap	Opponent	Score	Result	Competition	Ref.
1	23 March 2024	Parc Olympique Lyonnais, Lyon, France	15	France	1–0	2–0	Friendly	
2	14 June 2024	Allianz Arena, Munich, Germany	19	Scotland	1–0	5–1	UEFA Euro 2024	
3	5 July 2024	MHPArena, Stuttgart, Germany	23	Spain	1–1	1–2 (a.e.t.)	UEFA Euro 2024	
4	7 September 2024	Merkur Spiel-Arena, Düsseldorf, Germany	24	Hungary	3–0	5–0	2024–25 UEFA Nations League A	
5	16 November 2024	Europa-Park Stadion, Freiburg, Germany	28	Bosnia and Herzegovina	4–0	7–0	2024–25 UEFA Nations League A	
6	16 November 2024	Europa-Park Stadion, Freiburg, Germany	28	Bosnia and Herzegovina	5–0	7–0	2024–25 UEFA Nations League A	
7	4 June 2025	Allianz Arena, Munich, Germany	30	Portugal	1–0	1–2	2025 UEFA Nations League Finals	
8	7 September 2025	RheinEnergieStadion, Cologne, Germany	33	Northern Ireland	3–1	3–1	2026 FIFA World Cup qualification	
9	27 March 2026	St. Jakob-Park, Basel, Switzerland	38	Switzerland	3–2	4–3	Friendly	
10	27 March 2026	St. Jakob-Park, Basel, Switzerland	38	Switzerland	4–3	4–3	Friendly	
11	31 May 2026	Mewa Arena, Mainz, Germany	40	Finland	2–0	4–0	Friendly	
12	1 October 2026	Allianz Arena, Munich, Germany	47	Serbia	2–0	2–0	2026–27 UEFA Nations League A	
13	13 November 2026	Red Star Stadium, Belgrade, Serbia	49	Serbia	2–0	3–1	2026–27 UEFA Nations League A	
14	16 November 2026	Olympiastadion, Berlin, Germany	50	Netherlands	2–0	5–0	2026–27 UEFA Nations League A	
15	16 November 2026	Olympiastadion, Berlin, Germany	50	Netherlands	4–0	5–0	2026–27 UEFA Nations League A	

== Honours ==
Bayer Leverkusen

- Bundesliga: 2023–24
- DFB-Pokal: 2023–24
- DFL-Supercup: 2024
- UEFA Europa League runner-up: 2023–24

Germany U21

- UEFA European Under-21 Championship: 2021

Individual

- UEFA Europa League Young Player of the Season: 2022–23, 2023–24
- UEFA Europa League Team of the Season: 2023–24
- German Footballer of the Year: 2025
- Bundesliga Player of the Season: 2023–24
- Bundesliga Team of the Season: 2021–22, 2023–24, 2024–25
- Bundesliga Player of the Month: September 2021, October 2023, December 2023, February 2024, December 2024, January 2025
- Bundesliga Goal of the Month: January 2025
- VDV Player of the Season (Silver Boot): 2023–24, 2024–25
- VDV Newcomer of the Season (Silver Arrow): 2021–22
- VDV Team of the Season: 2021–22, 2023–24, 2024–25
- ESM Team of the Year: 2023–24
- Fritz Walter Medal U19 Gold: 2022
- Fritz Walter Medal U17 Gold: 2020
