= Arthur (footballer, born 2003) =

Brazilian footballer (born 2003)

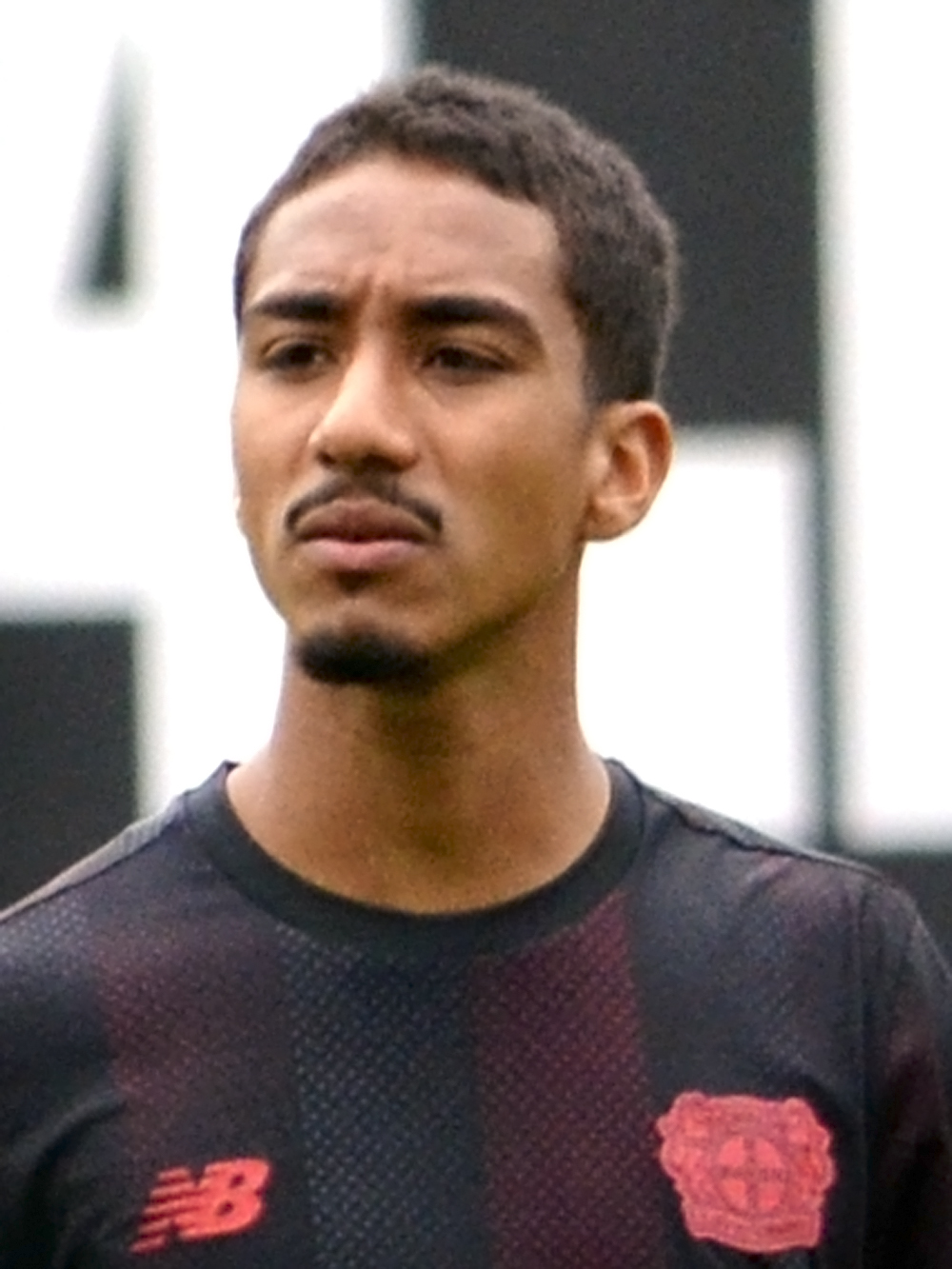
- Arthur with Bayer Leverkusen in 2025

Personal information
- Full name: Arthur Augusto de Matos Soares
- Date of birth: 17 March 2003 (age 23)
- Place of birth: Belo Horizonte, Brazil
- Height: 1.73 m (5 ft 8 in)
- Position: Right back

Team information
- Current team: Werder Bremen (on loan from Bayer Leverkusen)
- Number: 13

Youth career
- Dínamo de Araxá
- 2019–2021: América Mineiro
- 2020: → Flamengo (loan)

Senior career*
Years	Team	Apps	(Gls)
2022–2023	América Mineiro	22	(0)
2023–	Bayer Leverkusen	44	(1)
2026–	→ Werder Bremen (loan)	7	(0)

International career^{‡}
2023	Brazil U20	12	(0)
2023–	Brazil	1	(0)
Medal record
Men's football
Representing Brazil
South American U-20 Championship
Winner	2023 Colombia
- * Club domestic league appearances and goals as of 31 October 2026 ‡ National team caps and goals as of 19:24, 27 June 2023 (UTC)

Arthur Augusto de Matos Soares (born 17 March 2003), simply known as Arthur, is a Brazilian professional footballer who plays as a right back for Bundesliga club Werder Bremen, on loan from Bayer Leverkusen, and the Brazil national team.

== Club career ==
=== América Mineiro ===
Born in Belo Horizonte, Minas Gerais, Arthur joined América Mineiro's youth setup in 2019, after starting it out at Dínamo de Araxá. On 29 November of that year, he was loaned to Flamengo, with a buyout clause.

Arthur returned to América in 2021, and was promoted to the first team in December 2021. He made his senior debut on 25 January 2022, starting in a 1–2 Campeonato Mineiro away loss against Caldense.

Arthur made his Série A debut on 15 May 2022, coming on as a half-time substitute for Índio Ramírez in a 0–1 away loss against Coritiba.

=== Bayer Leverkusen ===
On 3 April 2023, Arthur signed a five-year contract with German club Bayer Leverkusen, effective in July.

On 1 September 2026, Arthur was loaned by Werder Bremen for the 2026–27 season.

== International career ==
Arthur won the 2023 South American U-20 Championship with Brazil's U20s. On 25 March 2023, he made his debut for the senior national team in a friendly against Morocco.

== Career statistics ==
=== Club ===
As of match played 31 October 2026

Appearances and goals by club, season and competition
Club	Season	League			State league (Note: Includes Campeonato Mineiro)		National cup (Note: Includes Copa do Brasil, DFB-Pokal)		Continental		Total	
Club	Season	Division	Apps	Goals	Apps	Goals	Apps	Goals	Apps	Goals	Apps	Goals
América Mineiro	2022	Série A	7	0	8	0	1	0	0	0	16	0
América Mineiro	2023	Série A	1	0	6	0	3	0	1 (Note: Appearance in Copa Sudamericana)	0	11	0
América Mineiro	Total		8	0	14	0	4	0	1	0	27	0
Bayer Leverkusen	2023–24	Bundesliga	4	0	—		1	0	0	0	5	0
Bayer Leverkusen	2024–25	Bundesliga	20	0	—		3	0	5 (Note: Appearances in UEFA Champions League)	0	28	0
Bayer Leverkusen	2025–26	Bundesliga	20	1	—		3	1	8	0	31	2
Bayer Leverkusen	Total		44	1	—		8	1	12	0	64	2
Werder Bremen	2026–27	Bundesliga	7	0	—		1	0	—		8	0
Career total			59	1	14	0	13	1	13	0	99	2

=== International ===
As of match played 25 March 2023

Appearances and goals by national team and year
National team	Year	Apps	Goals
Brazil	2023	1	0
Total		1	0

== Honours ==
Bayer Leverkusen

- Bundesliga: 2023–24
- DFL-Supercup: 2024

Brazil U20

- South American U-20 Championship: 2023
