= Amine Adli =

Morocco international footballer (born 2000)

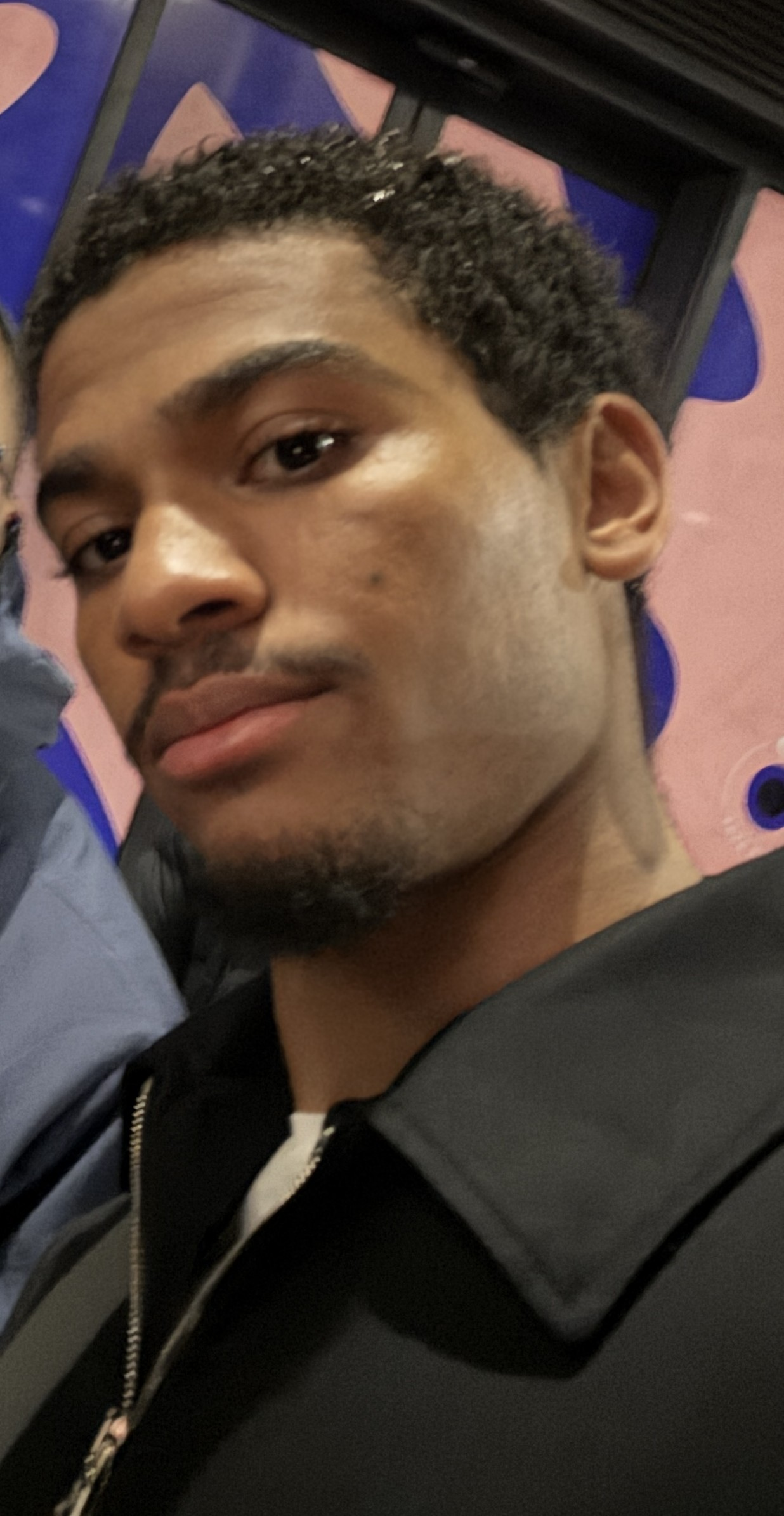
- Adli with Bournemouth in 2025

Personal information
- Date of birth: 10 May 2000 (age 26)
- Place of birth: Béziers, France
- Height: 1.74 m (5 ft 9 in)
- Positions: Attacking midfielder; winger; forward

Team information
- Current team: Bournemouth
- Number: 21

Youth career
- 2007–2012: Paulhan-Pézenas
- 2012–2015: Béziers
- 2015–2018: Toulouse

Senior career*
Years	Team	Apps	(Gls)
2018–2020	Toulouse II	30	(5)
2019–2021	Toulouse	38	(8)
2021–2025	Bayer Leverkusen	94	(14)
2025–	Bournemouth	34	(4)

International career^{‡}
2017–2018	France U18	6	(0)
2021–2023	France U21	12	(3)
2023–	Morocco	17	(1)
- * Club domestic league appearances and goals as of 20:54, 31 October 2026 (UTC) ‡ National team caps and goals as of 31 March 2026

Amine Adli (Arabic: أَمِين عَدْلِيّ; born 10 May 2000) is a professional footballer who plays as an attacking midfielder, winger, or forward for Premier League club Bournemouth. Born in France, he plays for the Morocco national team.

== Club career ==
=== Toulouse ===
On 30 October 2018, Adli signed his first professional contract with Toulouse. He made his professional debut with the club in a 3–1 Coupe de la Ligue loss to Lyon on 18 December 2019.

Adli helped Toulouse reach the playoffs in the 2020–21 Ligue 2 season, with 7 goals and 8 assists. He was then voted Ligue 2 player of the season.

=== Bayer Leverkusen ===
On 26 August 2021, Adli transferred to German club Bayer Leverkusen signing a five-year contract. He scored his first goal for the club on 30 September 2021 in a Europa League group stage match against Celtic; a 91st-minute goal to round off a 4–0 away win. On 20 November 2021, he scored his first Bundesliga goal, scoring the only goal after three minutes in a 1–0 win over VfL Bochum. On 18 March 2023, he was booked twice for simulation in the penalty area, but both were overturned by the referee after VAR. The resulting penalty kicks provided both goals in a 2–1 victory over eventual Bundesliga champions Bayern Munich.

In the last game of the 2021–22 season, Adli was sent off 8 minutes into Leverkusen's match against Bochum. Leverkusen lost 3–0, which could have caused them to drop out of the European qualification spots.

Adli was part of the Leverkusen squad that won the unbeaten 2023–24 Bundesliga title.

=== Bournemouth ===
On 21 August 2025, Adli joined Premier League club Bournemouth, signing a five-year contract in a deal reported to be £25.1 million. He made his debut for the club as a substitute on 23 August in a 1–0 home win against Wolverhampton Wanderers, and made his start for the club a month later in a 2–2 away draw against Leeds United. He scored his first goal for the club in a 3–2 defeat to Sunderland on 29 November 2025. On 24 January 2026, he scored a dramatic 95th-minute winner in a 3–2 win against Liverpool to hand their first win over the Reds since 11 March 2023.

== International career ==
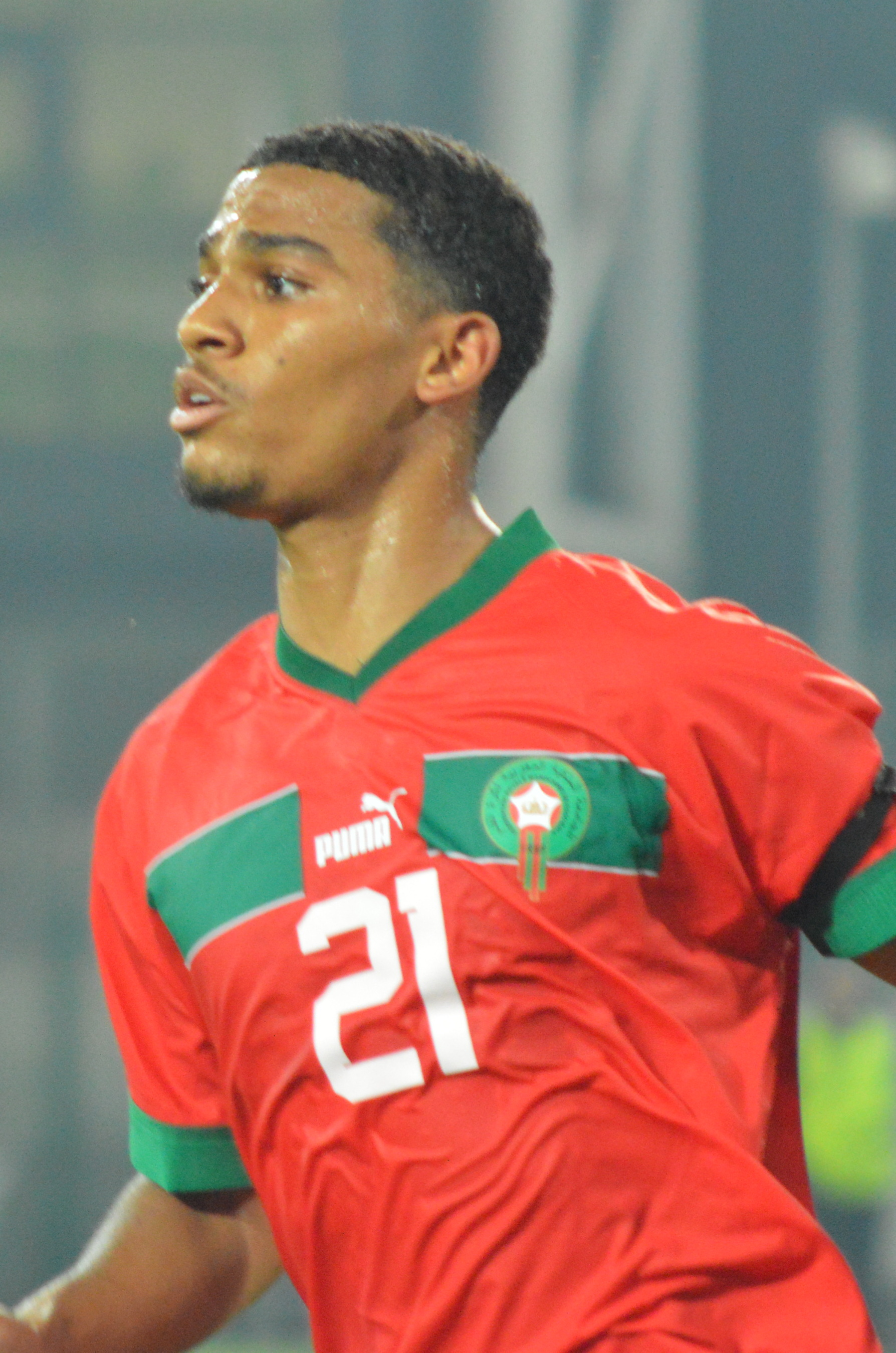
Adli with Morocco in 2023

Born in France, Adli holds French and Moroccan nationalities. He was a youth international for France, but has chosen to represent Morocco as a senior instead.

In August 2023, Adli was called up for the first time to join the Moroccan national team, for the upcoming games against Liberia and Burkina Faso.

On 17 October 2023, Adli scored his first goal for the national team in a 3–0 victory against Liberia. Two months later, on 28 December, he was named in the 27-man squad for the 2023 Africa Cup of Nations in Ivory Coast.

== Career statistics ==
=== Club ===
As of match played 31 October 2026

Appearances and goals by club, season and competition
Club	Season	League			National cup (Note: Includes Coupe de France, DFB-Pokal, FA Cup)		League cup (Note: Includes Coupe de la Ligue, EFL Cup)		Europe		Other		Total	
Club	Season	Division	Apps	Goals	Apps	Goals	Apps	Goals	Apps	Goals	Apps	Goals	Apps	Goals
Toulouse II	2017–18	National 3	3	0	—		—		—		—		3	0
Toulouse II	2018–19	National 3	18	4	—		—		—		—		18	4
Toulouse II	2019–20	National 3	9	1	—		—		—		—		9	1
Toulouse II	Total		30	5	—		—		—		—		30	5
Toulouse	2019–20	Ligue 1	4	0	1	0	1	0	—		—		6	0
Toulouse	2020–21	Ligue 2	33	8	0	0	—		—		3 (Note: Appearances in Ligue 2 promotion play-offs)	0	36	8
Toulouse	2021–22	Ligue 2	1	0	—		—		—		—		1	0
Toulouse	Total		38	8	1	0	1	0	—		3	0	43	8
Bayer Leverkusen	2021–22	Bundesliga	25	3	1	0	—		8 (Note: Appearances in UEFA Europa League)	1	—		34	4
Bayer Leverkusen	2022–23	Bundesliga	26	5	0	0	—		12 (Note: Four appearances in UEFA Champions League, eight appearances and two goals in UEFA Europa League)	2	—		38	7
Bayer Leverkusen	2023–24	Bundesliga	23	4	6	5	—		13	1	—		42	10
Bayer Leverkusen	2024–25	Bundesliga	20	2	2	0	—		5 (Note: Appearances in UEFA Champions League)	0	1 (Note: Appearance in DFL-Supercup)	0	28	2
Bayer Leverkusen	2025–26	Bundesliga	—		1	0	—		—		—		1	0
Bayer Leverkusen	Total		94	14	10	5	—		38	4	1	0	143	23
Bournemouth	2025–26	Premier League	31	3	1	0	1	0	—		—		33	3
Bournemouth	2026–27	Premier League	3	1	0	0	1	1	2	1	—		6	3
Bournemouth	Total		34	4	1	0	2	1	2	1	—		39	6
Career total			193	30	12	5	3	1	40	5	4	0	251	41

=== International ===
As of match played 31 March 2026

Appearances and goals by national team and year
National team	Year	Apps	Goals
Morocco	2023	4	1
Morocco	2024	10	0
Morocco	2025	2	0
Morocco	2026	1	0
Total		17	1

As of match played 31 March 2026
Morocco score listed first, score column indicates score after each Adli goal

List of international goals scored by Amine Adli
No.	Date	Venue	Opponent	Score	Result	Competition
1	17 October 2023	Adrar Stadium, Agadir, Morocco	Liberia	3–0	3–0	2023 Africa Cup of Nations qualification

== Honours ==
Bayer Leverkusen

- Bundesliga: 2023–24
- DFB-Pokal: 2023–24
- DFL-Supercup: 2024
- UEFA Europa League runner-up: 2023–24

Individual

- Ligue 2 Player of the Year: 2020–21
- Ligue 2 Team of the Year: 2020–21
- DFB-Pokal Top Goalscorer: 2023–24
