= Nathan Tella =

Nigeria international footballer (born 1999)

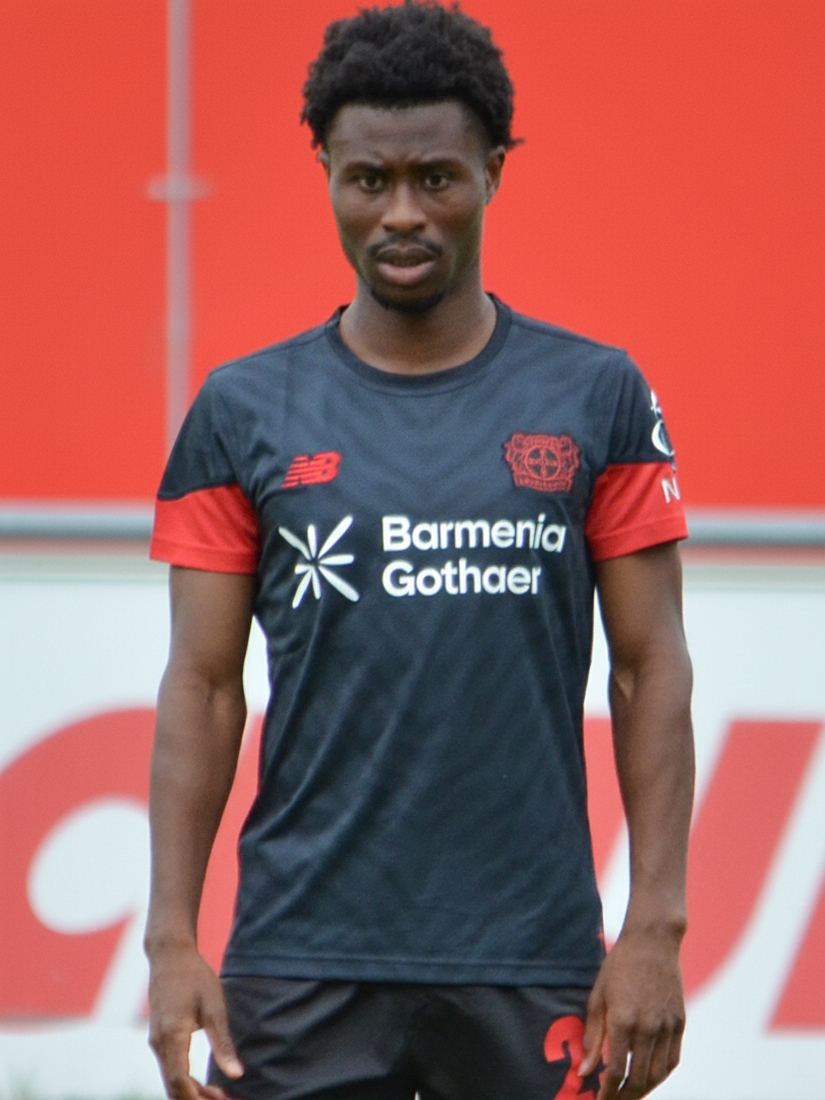
- Tella with Bayer Leverkusen in 2025

Personal information
- Full name: Nathan Adewale Temitayo Tella
- Date of birth: 5 July 1999 (age 27)
- Place of birth: Stevenage, England
- Height: 1.73 m (5 ft 8 in)
- Positions: Right winger; forward

Team information
- Current team: Bayer Leverkusen
- Number: 23

Youth career
- 2007–2017: Arsenal
- 2017–2020: Southampton

Senior career*
| Years | Team | Apps | (Gls) |
| 2020–2023 | Southampton | 36 | (2) |
| 2022–2023 | → Burnley (loan) | 39 | (17) |
| 2023– | Bayer Leverkusen | 71 | (8) |

International career^{‡}
| 2023– | Nigeria | 2 | (0) |
- * Club domestic league appearances and goals as of 17:30, 25 October 2026 (UTC) ‡ National team caps and goals as of 31 May 2025

Nathan Adewale Temitayo Tella (born 5 July 1999) is a professional footballer who plays as a right winger or forward for Bundesliga club Bayer Leverkusen. Born in England, he plays for the Nigeria national team.

== Club career ==
=== Early career ===
Tella grew up in Stevenage, Hertfordshire and was educated at Edwinstree Middle School and then Freman College, both in the town of Buntingford. He left following his GCSE exams in 2015. After ten years with Arsenal, Tella spent time on trial at Reading and Norwich City, before joining Southampton in April 2017.

=== Southampton ===
In July 2019, he extended his contract with the club for a further year, before signing a further three-year extension in July 2020. On 19 June 2020, Tella made his senior debut as a substitute in a 3–0 victory against Norwich City. On 11 February 2021, he made his first goal contribution by providing an assist to Stuart Armstrong's goal in a 2–0 FA Cup fifth round win against Wolverhampton Wanderers. On 23 February, Tella made his first Premier League start in a 3–0 defeat to Leeds United. On 15 May, Tella scored his first Premier League goal in a 3–1 win against Fulham.

On 6 January 2022, Tella signed a new three-and-a-half year contract with Southampton.

==== Burnley (loan) ====
On 11 August 2022, Tella joined Burnley on a season-long loan. On 11 February 2023, he scored a first career hat-trick in a 3–0 victory over Preston North End, his side's tenth consecutive league victory, and a month later scored a second hat-trick in a 3–1 victory over Hull City.

=== Bayer Leverkusen ===
On 27 August 2023, Bundesliga club Bayer Leverkusen announced the signing of Tella on a five-year contract, for a reported fee of £20 million. He made his first appearance for the club on 2 September 2023 in a 5–1 victory against Darmstadt 98, replacing Jeremie Frimpong in the 72nd minute. On 5 October 2023, Tella scored his first goal for Bayer Leverkusen in a 1–2 victory against Molde in the Europa League.

== International career ==
On 10 November 2023, Tella was called up by Nigeria head coach, José Peseiro for the 2026 FIFA World Cup qualifiers against Lesotho and Zimbabwe.

== Personal life ==
Born in England, Tella is of Nigerian descent.

== Career statistics ==
=== Club ===
As of match played 28 October 2026

Appearances and goals by club, season and competition
| Club | Season | League | | | National cup (Note: Includes FA Cup, DFB-Pokal) | | League cup (Note: Includes EFL Cup) | | Europe | | Other | | Total | |
| Club | Season | Division | Apps | Goals | Apps | Goals | Apps | Goals | Apps | Goals | Apps | Goals | Apps | Goals |
|---|---|---|---|---|---|---|---|---|---|---|---|---|---|---|
| Southampton U23 | 2017–18 | — | | | — | | — | | — | | 2 (Note: Appearance(s) in EFL Trophy) | 0 | 2 | 0 |
| Southampton U23 | 2018–19 | — | | | — | | — | | — | | 3 | 0 | 3 | 0 |
| Southampton U23 | 2020–21 | — | | | — | | — | | — | | 1 | 0 | 1 | 0 |
| Southampton U23 | Total | | — | | — | | — | | — | | 6 | 0 | 6 | 0 |
| Southampton | 2019–20 | Premier League | 1 | 0 | 0 | 0 | 0 | 0 | — | | — | | 1 | 0 |
| Southampton | 2020–21 | Premier League | 18 | 1 | 3 | 0 | 1 | 0 | — | | — | | 22 | 1 |
| Southampton | 2021–22 | Premier League | 14 | 0 | 1 | 0 | 3 | 1 | — | | — | | 18 | 1 |
| Southampton | 2023–24 | Championship | 3 | 1 | — | | — | | — | | — | | 3 | 1 |
| Southampton | Total | | 36 | 2 | 4 | 0 | 4 | 1 | — | | — | | 44 | 3 |
| Burnley (loan) | 2022–23 | Championship | 39 | 17 | 5 | 2 | 1 | 0 | — | | — | | 45 | 19 |
| Bayer Leverkusen | 2023–24 | Bundesliga | 24 | 5 | 4 | 0 | — | | 11 (Note: Appearances in UEFA Europa League) | 1 | — | | 39 | 6 |
| Bayer Leverkusen | 2024–25 | Bundesliga | 27 | 2 | 5 | 1 | — | | 7 (Note: Appearances in UEFA Champions League) | 1 | 1 (Note: Appearance in DFL-Supercup) | 0 | 40 | 4 |
| Bayer Leverkusen | 2025–26 | Bundesliga | 17 | 1 | 2 | 0 | — | | 2 | 0 | — | | 21 | 1 |
| Bayer Leverkusen | 2026–27 | Bundesliga | 3 | 0 | 2 | 1 | — | | 0 | — | | 7 | 1 | |
| Bayer Leverkusen | Total | | 71 | 8 | 13 | 2 | — | | 22 | 2 | 1 | 0 | 107 | 12 |
| Career total | | | 146 | 27 | 22 | 4 | 5 | 1 | 22 | 2 | 7 | 0 | 202 | 34 |

=== International ===
As of match played 31 May 2025

Appearances and goals by national team and year
| National team | Year | Apps | Goals |
|---|---|---|---|
| Nigeria | 2023 | 1 | 0 |
| Nigeria | 2025 | 1 | 0 |
| Total | | 2 | 0 |

== Honours ==
Burnley

- EFL Championship: 2022–23

Bayer Leverkusen

- Bundesliga: 2023–24
- DFB-Pokal: 2023–24
- DFL-Supercup: 2024

Individual

- PFA Championship Fans' Player of the Month: March 2023
- EFL Championship Team of the Season: 2022–23
- PFA Team of the Year: 2022–23 Championship
