= Ayman Aourir =

Moroccan footballer (born 2004)

Personal information
- Date of birth: 6 October 2004 (age 22)
- Place of birth: Cologne, Germany
- Height: 1.72 m (5 ft 8 in)
- Position: Attacking midfielder

Team information
- Current team: Rot-Weiß Oberhausen
- Number: 27

Youth career
- 2009–2016: SSV Ostheim
- 2016–2018: Viktoria Köln
- 2018–2023: Bayer Leverkusen

Senior career*
Years	Team	Apps	(Gls)
2023–2024	Bayer Leverkusen	0	(0)
2024–2025	Alemannia Aachen	2	(0)
2025	Eintracht Hohkeppel	16	(3)
2025–	Rot-Weiß Oberhausen	21	(3)

International career^{‡}
2021	Morocco U17	2	(0)
- * Club domestic league appearances and goals as of 24 June 2026 ‡ National team caps and goals as of 03:15, 1 December 2023 (UTC)

Ayman Aourir (Arabic: أيمن أورير; born 6 October 2004) is a professional footballer who plays as an attacking midfielder for Regionalliga club Rot-Weiß Oberhausen. Born in Germany, he is a youth international for Morocco.

== Club career ==
Aourir is a youth product of SSV Ostheim and Viktoria Köln, before moving to Bayer Leverkusen's academy in 2018. On 25 January 2023, he signed his first professional contract with Bayer Leverkusen. He made his professional debut with them as a late substitute in a 2–0 UEFA Europa League win over Häcken on 30 October 2023.

On 20 September 2024, Aourir signed with 3. Liga club Alemannia Aachen after being released from his contract by Bayer in late August.

== International career ==
Born in Germany, Aourir was born to a Moroccan father and Algerian mother and is eligible for all three national teams. He made two appearances for the Morocco U17s in 2021. In September 2022, he was called up to the Morocco U20s.
