= Fernando Carro (businessman) =

Spanish businessman (born 1964)

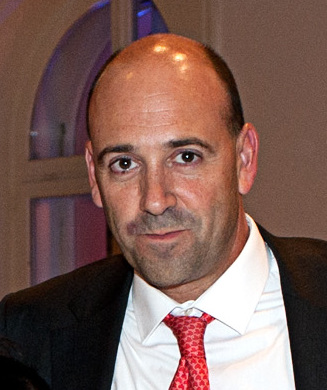
- Born: 27 July 1964 (age 62); Barcelona, Spain
- Education: Karlsruhe Institute of Technology
- Occupation: Businessman
- Website: bundesliga-group.com

Fernando Carro de Prada (born 27 July 1964) is a Spanish football director who is the CEO of Bayer Leverkusen. He was appointed chairman and CEO of the Arvato AG from 2015 to 2017.

== Early life ==
Carro is the son of a Spanish teacher mother. Carro grew up in Barcelona. He attended the German School of Barcelona, graduating in 1982. He then trained as a technical sales representative with BASF in Spain, and went on to study industrial engineering and management at the Karlsruhe Institute of Technology in Germany. During his time as a university student and in his first years after it, Fernando was President of AIESEC International.

== Career ==
After completing his university studies, he joined Bertelsmann in Gütersloh in 1993. He held various positions there for 24 years, including a position on the Group Executive Board. In 2015, the Supervisory Board of Arvato AG, appointed him chairman and CEO. Shortly afterwards, following an internal reorganization, he became managing director of the company and oversaw the reintegration of AG into Bertelsmann's global structure in 2016.

In 2018, Carro was appointed CEO of German Bundesliga side Bayer Leverkusen. He is credited with helping the club win the league.

Since 2021, Carro has also been a member of the executive board of the European Club Association.

== Personal life ==
Carro has been married. He has three children.
