= Jonathan Tah =

German footballer (born 1996)

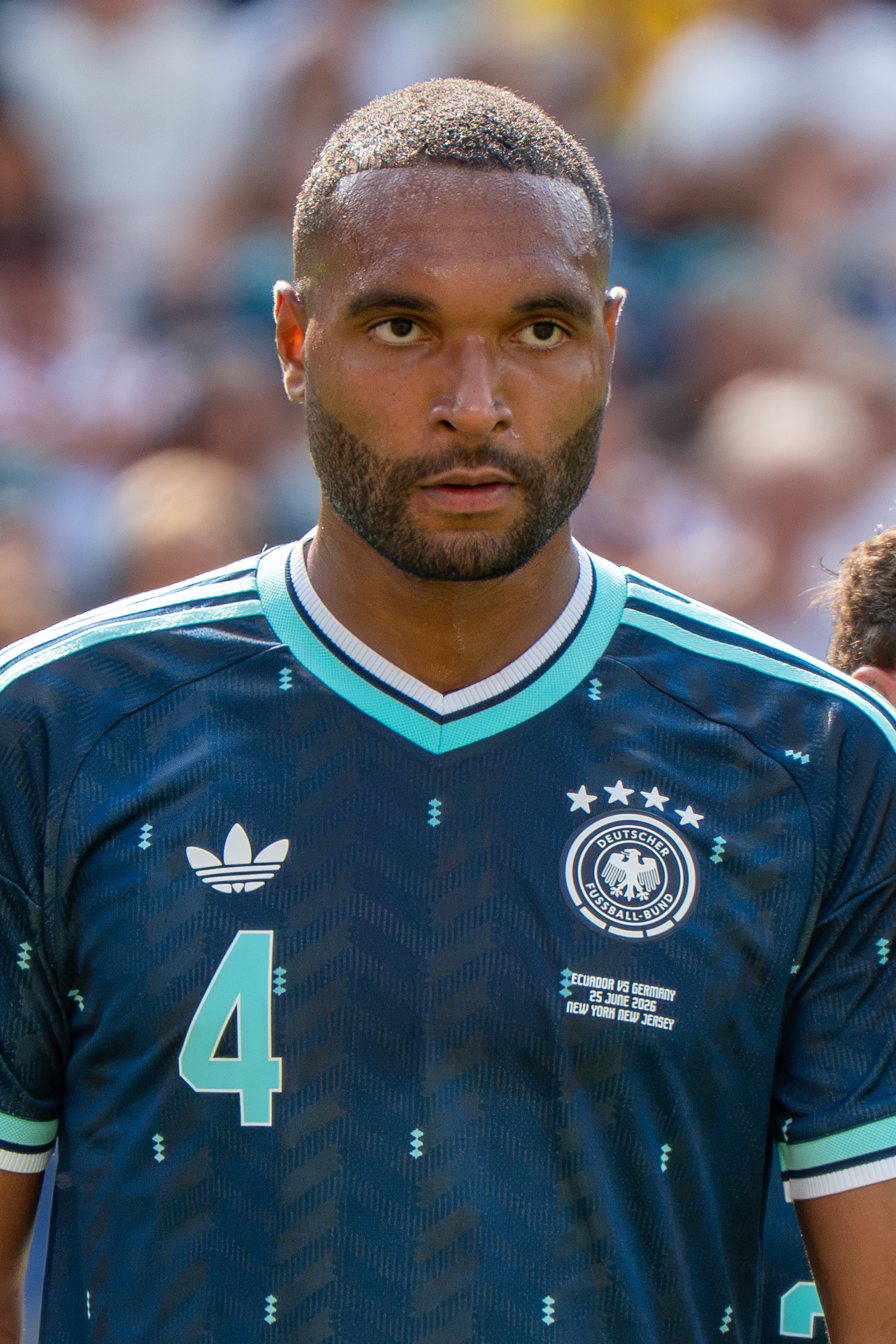
- Tah with Germany in 2026

Personal information
- Full name: Jonathan Glao Tah
- Date of birth: 11 February 1996 (age 30)
- Place of birth: Hamburg, Germany
- Height: 1.95 m (6 ft 5 in)
- Position: Centre-back

Team information
- Current team: Bayern Munich
- Number: 4

Youth career
- 2000–2008: Altona 93
- 2008–2009: SC Concordia
- 2009–2014: Hamburger SV

Senior career*
Years	Team	Apps	(Gls)
2013–2014	Hamburger SV II	8	(0)
2013–2015	Hamburger SV	16	(0)
2014–2015	→ Fortuna Düsseldorf (loan)	23	(0)
2015–2025	Bayer Leverkusen	291	(15)
2025–	Bayern Munich	35	(2)

International career^{‡}
2011–2012	Germany U16	5	(1)
2012–2013	Germany U17	13	(0)
2014–2015	Germany U19	6	(1)
2015–2019	Germany U21	14	(0)
2016–	Germany	55	(1)
- * Club domestic league appearances and goals as of 21:24, 20 November 2026 (UTC) ‡ National team caps and goals as of 21:40, 16 November 2026 (UTC)

Jonathan Glao Tah (German pronunciation: [ˈjoːnatan ˈtaː]; born 11 February 1996) is a German professional footballer who plays as a centre-back for Bundesliga club Bayern Munich and the Germany national team.

Tah began his professional career with Hamburger SV, making his debut for the club in August 2013, and making his Bundesliga debut a month later. After a brief loan spell with Fortuna Düsseldorf in the 2014–15 season, he signed for Bayer Leverkusen in July 2015. He was a part of the Leverkusen squad that won the 2023–24 Bundesliga championship in an unbeaten run, and during his decade-long tenure with the club, made 402 total appearances for Leverkusen. In May 2025, he moved to fellow German side Bayern Munich.

== Early life ==
Tah was born in Hamburg, to an Ivorian father and a German mother. He grew up in the Hamburg district of Altona. His cousin Mikael Baza is also a professional footballer.

== Club career ==
=== Hamburger SV and loan out ===
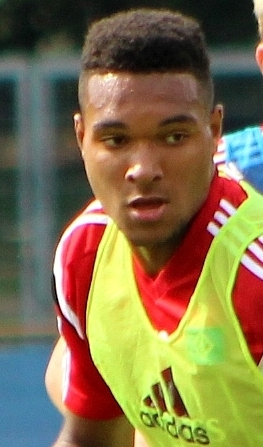
Tah training with Hamburger SV in 2014

Tah started playing football at local clubs Altona 93 and SC Concordia before being scouted by Hamburger SV. On 4 August 2013, Tah made his competitive debut for Hamburg in a DFB-Pokal match against SV Schott Jena. He made his Bundesliga debut on 21 September 2013 in a 2-0 home loss against Werder Bremen.

On 1 September 2014, Tah was loaned to Fortuna Düsseldorf for a year.

=== Bayer Leverkusen ===
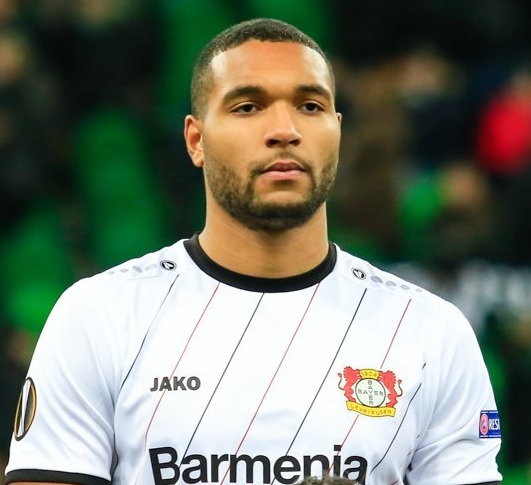
Tah with Bayer Leverkusen in 2019

On 15 July 2015, Tah signed a five-year contract with Bundesliga club Bayer Leverkusen for a fee of €7.5 million. On 28 January 2017, he scored his first senior career goal in a 3–2 defeat against Borussia Mönchengladbach.

On 26 February 2018, Bayer Leverkusen announced the extension of his contract with the club until 2023. Tah made his 100th Bundesliga appearance for the club on 10 March 2019.

In September 2021, Tah signed a contract extension with the club until 2025.

Tah was part of the Leverkusen side that won their first Bundesliga title ever during the 2023–24 season, clinching the league with a win against Werder Bremen on 14 April 2024. On 3 May, he was included in the Bundesliga team of the season along with five of his Leverkusen teammates.

In September 2024, Tah announced that he would not renew his contract with Leverkusen. He left the club as a free agent when his contract expired following the conclusion of the 2024–25 season.

=== Bayern Munich ===
On 29 May 2025, Tah joined fellow Bundesliga side Bayern Munich, signing a deal until 30 June 2029. It was reported that Bayern paid a fixed fee of €800,000, not including bonuses, to have him available for the 2025 FIFA Club World Cup prior to the expiration of his contract with Leverkusen. On 26 September, he scored his first goal for the club in a 4–0 victory over Werder Bremen. Later that year, on 9 December, he netted his first UEFA Champions League goal in a 3–1 victory over Sporting CP.

== International career ==
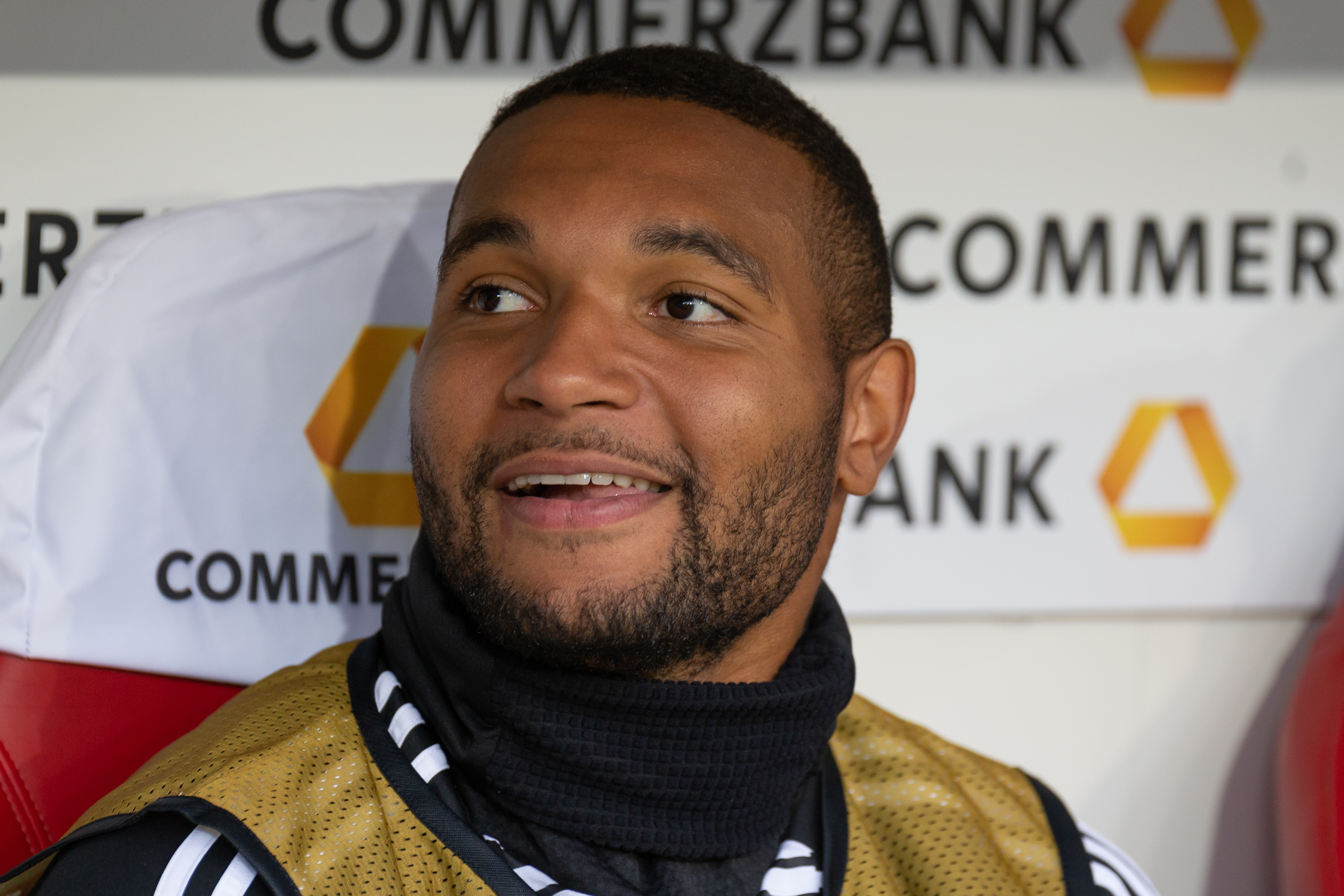
Tah with Germany in 2019

After playing for the Germany youth sides from U16 to U21, Tah received his first call up to the senior Germany squad in March 2016 for friendlies against England and Italy. He made his debut in the former, coming on at half-time for Mats Hummels in a 2–3 loss. He was called up to replace Antonio Rüdiger at UEFA Euro 2016, but didn't play in the tournament.

Tah was not included in the Germany squads for the 2018 or 2022 editions of the FIFA World Cup, but was named in Germany's squad for UEFA Euro 2024, which was announced to be held in Germany.

On 27 March 2026, Tah scored his first international goal for Germany in a 4–3 away victory against Switzerland.

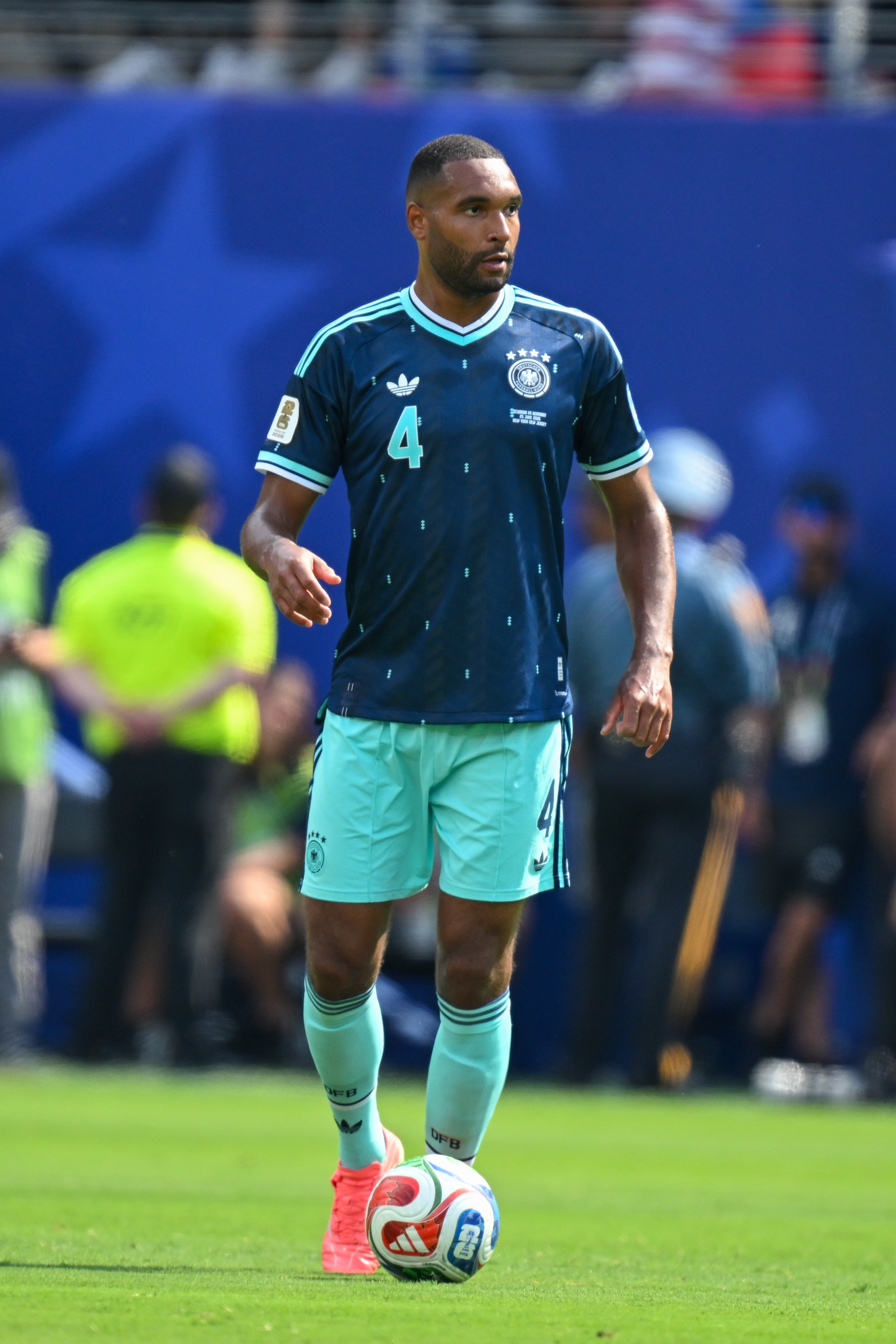
Tah playing for Germany at the 2026 FIFA World Cup

On 21 May 2026, Tah was selected to Germany's 2026 FIFA World Cup squad by manager Julian Nagelsmann. In the Round of 32 against Paraguay, he scored the apparent lead-taking header via a corner in extra time, however it was controversially disallowed by VAR due to a foul against the goalkeeper by Waldemar Anton. In the subsequent penalty shootout, Tah missed his penalty over the goal in sudden death, as Germany were defeated on penalties in the World Cup for the first time.

== Career statistics ==
=== Club ===
As of match played 20 November 2026

Appearances and goals by club, season and competition
Club	Season	League			DFB-Pokal		Europe		Other		Total	
Club	Season	Division	Apps	Goals	Apps	Goals	Apps	Goals	Apps	Goals	Apps	Goals
Hamburger SV	2013–14	Bundesliga	16	0	4	0	—		0	0	20	0
Fortuna Düsseldorf (loan)	2014–15	2. Bundesliga	23	0	0	0	—		—		23	0
Bayer Leverkusen	2015–16	Bundesliga	29	0	4	0	12 (Note: Eight appearances in UEFA Champions League, four appearances in UEFA Europa League)	0	—		45	0
Bayer Leverkusen	2016–17	Bundesliga	19	1	2	0	5 (Note: Appearances in UEFA Champions League)	0	—		26	1
Bayer Leverkusen	2017–18	Bundesliga	28	0	5	0	—		—		33	0
Bayer Leverkusen	2018–19	Bundesliga	33	3	2	0	3 (Note: Appearances in UEFA Europa League)	0	—		38	3
Bayer Leverkusen	2019–20	Bundesliga	25	0	5	0	9 (Note: Five appearances in UEFA Champions League, four appearances in UEFA Europa League)	0	—		39	0
Bayer Leverkusen	2020–21	Bundesliga	27	1	1	0	7	0	—		35	1
Bayer Leverkusen	2021–22	Bundesliga	33	2	1	0	8	0	—		42	2
Bayer Leverkusen	2022–23	Bundesliga	33	1	0	0	14 (Note: Six appearances in UEFA Champions League, eight appearances in UEFA Europa League)	0	—		47	1
Bayer Leverkusen	2023–24	Bundesliga	31	4	6	2	11	0	—		48	6
Bayer Leverkusen	2024–25	Bundesliga	33	3	5	1	10	0	1 (Note: Appearance in DFL-/Franz Beckenbauer Supercup)	0	49	4
Bayer Leverkusen	Total		291	15	31	3	79	0	1	0	402	18
Bayern Munich	2024–25	Bundesliga	—		—		—		5 (Note: Appearances in FIFA Club World Cup)	0	5	0
Bayern Munich	2025–26	Bundesliga	28	2	6	0	14	1	1	0	49	3
Bayern Munich	2026–27	Bundesliga	7	0	2	0	4	0	1	0	14	0
Bayern Munich	Total		35	2	8	0	18	1	7	0	68	3
Career total			365	17	44	3	96	1	7	0	513	21

=== International ===
As of match played 16 November 2026

Appearances and goals by national team and year
National team	Year	Apps	Goals
Germany
Germany	2016	4	0
Germany	2019	5	0
Germany	2020	4	0
Germany	2021	1	0
Germany	2022	2	0
Germany	2023	5	0
Germany	2024	12	0
Germany	2025	10	0
Germany	2026	12	1
Total		55	1

As of match played 27 March 2026
Germany score listed first, score column indicates score after each Tah goal

List of international goals scored by Jonathan Tah
No.	Date	Venue	Cap	Opponent	Score	Result	Competition	Ref.
1	27 March 2026	St. Jakob-Park, Basel, Switzerland	44	Switzerland	1–1	4–3	Friendly	

== Honours ==
Bayer Leverkusen

- Bundesliga: 2023–24
- DFB-Pokal: 2023–24
- DFL-Supercup: 2024

Bayern Munich

- Bundesliga: 2025–26
- DFB-Pokal: 2025–26
- Franz Beckenbauer Supercup: 2025, 2026

Individual

- Fritz Walter Medal U19 Gold: 2015
- UEFA Europa League Team of the Season: 2019–20, 2022–23, 2023–24
- Bundesliga Team of the Season: 2023–24, 2024–25, 2025–26
- VDV Bundesliga Team of the Season: 2023–24, 2024–25, 2025–26
- The Athletic Bundesliga Team of the Season: 2023–24
