= 2022–23 Bayer 04 Leverkusen season =

Bayer 04 Leverkusen
2022–23 season
- Owner: Bayer AG
- Administration: Fernando Carro (CEO); Rudi Völler (Managing Director Sports)
- Head coach: Gerardo Seoane (until 5 October); Xabi Alonso (from 5 October)
- Stadium: BayArena
- Bundesliga: 6th
- DFB-Pokal: First round
- UEFA Champions League: Group stage
- UEFA Europa League: Semi-finals
- Top goalscorer: League: Moussa Diaby (9); All: Moussa Diaby (14)
Home colours	Away colours	Third colours

The 2022–23 season was the 119th season in the history of Bayer 04 Leverkusen and their 44th consecutive season in the top flight. The club participated in the Bundesliga, DFB-Pokal, UEFA Champions League and UEFA Europa League.

== Players ==
=== First-team squad ===
As of 2 April 2023

Note: Flags indicate national team as defined under FIFA eligibility rules; some limited exceptions apply. Players may hold more than one non-FIFA nationality.

No.	Pos.	Nation	Player
1	GK	FIN	Lukas Hradecky (captain)
3	DF	ECU	Piero Hincapié
4	DF	GER	Jonathan Tah (3rd captain)
5	DF	NED	Mitchel Bakker
6	DF	CIV	Odilon Kossounou
8	MF	GER	Robert Andrich
9	FW	IRI	Sardar Azmoun
10	MF	GER	Kerem Demirbay
11	MF	GER	Nadiem Amiri
12	DF	BFA	Edmond Tapsoba
14	FW	CZE	Patrik Schick
17	FW	ENG	Callum Hudson-Odoi (on loan from Chelsea)
18	DF	BEL	Noah Mbamba
19	FW	FRA	Moussa Diaby

No.	Pos.	Nation	Player
21	FW	FRA	Amine Adli
22	DF	NED	Daley Sinkgraven
23	FW	CZE	Adam Hložek
24	DF	NED	Timothy Fosu-Mensah
25	MF	ARG	Exequiel Palacios
27	MF	GER	Florian Wirtz
28	GK	AUT	Patrick Pentz
30	DF	NED	Jeremie Frimpong
32	MF	MAR	Ayman Azhil
35	MF	GER	Joshua Eze
36	GK	GER	Niklas Lomb
38	FW	GER	Karim Bellarabi
40	GK	RUS	Andrey Lunyov

=== Players out on loan ===
Note: Flags indicate national team as defined under FIFA eligibility rules; some limited exceptions apply. Players may hold more than one non-FIFA nationality.

No.	Pos.	Nation	Player
—	FW	ESP	Iker Bravo (at Real Madrid until 30 June 2023)
—	DF	TOG	Sadik Fofana (at 1. FC Nürnberg until 30 June 2024)
—	GK	GER	Lennart Grill (at Union Berlin until 30 June 2023)
—	FW	BRA	Paulinho (at Atlético Mineiro until 30 June 2023)
—	MF	COL	Gustavo Puerta (at 1. FC Nürnberg until 30 June 2024)

== Transfers ==
=== In ===
No.	Pos.	Player	Transferred from	Fee	Date	Source
23	FW	Adam Hložek (CZE)	Sparta Prague (CZE)	€13,000,000	1 July 2022	
17	FW	Callum Hudson-Odoi (ENG)	Chelsea (ENG)	Loan	30 August 2022	
18	DF	Noah Mbamba (BEL)	Club Brugge (BEL)	€100,000	14 January 2023	
28	GK	Patrick Pentz (AUT)	Reims (FRA)	Undisclosed	27 January 2023	
	MF	Gustavo Puerta (COL)	Bogotá (COL)	€2,000,000	31 January 2023	

=== Out ===
No.	Pos.	Player	Transferred to	Fee	Date	Source
13	FW	Lucas Alario (ARG)	Eintracht Frankfurt (GER)	€6,000,000	1 July 2022	
15	MF	Julian Baumgartlinger (AUT)	FC Augsburg (GER)	Free	1 July 2022	
21	GK	Lennart Grill (GER)	Union Berlin (GER)	Loan	1 July 2022	
	DF	Sadik Fofana (TOG)	1. FC Nürnberg (GER)	Loan	2 July 2022	
23	DF	Mitchell Weiser (GER)	Werder Bremen (GER)	Free	15 July 2022	
17	FW	Joel Pohjanpalo (FIN)	Venezia (ITA)	€2,500,000	19 August 2022	
28	FW	Iker Bravo (ESP)	Real Madrid (ESP)	Loan	29 August 2022	
7	FW	Paulinho (BRA)	Atlético Mineiro (BRA)	Loan	1 January 2023	
	MF	Gustavo Puerta (COL)	1. FC Nürnberg (GER)	Loan	31 January 2023	
29	MF	Zidan Sertdemir (DEN)	Nordsjaelland (DEN)	Undisclosed	31 January 2023	
20	MF	Charles Aránguiz (CHI)	Internacional (BRA)	Free	2 April 2023	

== Pre-season and friendlies ==
Win Draw Loss Fixtures

9 July 2022 Friendly	Bayer Leverkusen	6–1	MSV Duisburg	Velbert
15:30 CEST (UTC+2)	Bravo 3', 49', 50'; Aourir 9'; Fosu-Mensah 22'; Sinkgraven 44'	Report	Hettwer 41'	Stadium: IMS Arena; Attendance: 2,011; Referee: Nico Fuchs

17 July 2022 Friendly	Bayer Leverkusen	0–0	Panathinaikos	Zell am See, Austria
17:00 CEST (UTC+2)		Report	Šarlija (yellow card) 56'; Alexandropoulos (yellow card) 58'	Stadium: Alois Latini Stadion; Attendance: 400; Referee: Stefan Eder (Austria)

21 July 2022 Friendly	Udinese	1–2	Bayer Leverkusen	Zell am See, Austria
18:00 CEST (UTC+2)	Silvestri (yellow card) 22'; Nestorovski (yellow card) 47'; Nuytinck (yellow card) 51'; Pereyra 82' (pen.); Soppy (yellow card) 84'	Report	Andrich (yellow card) 47'; Tah (yellow card) 52'; Tapsoba 55'; Paulinho 76'	Stadium: Alois Latini Stadion; Attendance: 600; Referee: Samuel Sampl (Austria)

16 November 2022 Friendly	St. Louis City SC 2	0–3	Bayer Leverkusen	St. Louis, United States
21:00 CST (UTC−6)	Pidro (yellow card) 17'	Report	Hudson-Odoi 36'; Eze (yellow card) 38'; Hložek 44', 51'; Sertdemir (yellow card) 58'	Stadium: Citypark; Attendance: 22,500; Referee: Jervis Atagana (United States)

10 December 2022 Friendly	Rangers	3–0	Bayer Leverkusen	Glasgow, Scotland
12:00 GMT (UTC±0)	Tillman 15', 21'; Tavernier (penalty missed) 81'; Arfield 84'	Report		Stadium: Ibrox Stadium; Attendance: 26,192; Referee: Don Robertson (Scotland)

17 December 2022 Friendly	Bayer Leverkusen	4–1	Zürich	Leverkusen, Germany
13:00 CET (UTC+1)	Diaby 38'; Wirtz 45'; Azmoun 63'; Adli 86'	Report	Condé 64'	Stadium: BayArena; Attendance: 3,000; Referee: Nico Fuchs (Germany)

7 January 2023 Friendly	Bayer Leverkusen	2–1	Venezia	Leverkusen, Germany
15:00 CET (UTC+1)	Wirtz 37'; Adli 44'	Report	Novakovich 68'	Stadium: BayArena; Attendance: 1,400; Referee: Mitja Stegemann (Germany)

15 January 2023 Friendly	Bayer Leverkusen	1–0	Copenhagen	Leverkusen, Germany
13:00 CET (UTC+1)	Palacios (yellow card) 26'; Adli 69'	Report	Diks (yellow card) 55'	Stadium: BayArena; Attendance: 8,096; Referee: Martin Thomsen (Germany)

== Competitions ==
=== Overall record ===
Competition	First match	Last match	Starting round	Final position	Record							
Competition	First match	Last match	Starting round	Final position	Pld	W	D	L	GF	GA	GD	Win %
Bundesliga	6 August 2022	27 May 2023	Matchday 1	6th	34	14	8	12	57	49	+8	41.18
DFB-Pokal	30 July 2022		First round	First round	1	0	0	1	3	4	−1	0.00
UEFA Champions League	7 September 2022	1 November 2022	Group stage	Group stage	6	1	2	3	4	8	−4	16.67
UEFA Europa League	16 February 2023	18 May 2023	Knockout round play-offs	Semi-finals	8	4	2	2	14	8	+6	50.00
Total					49	19	12	18	78	69	+9	38.78

Source: Soccerway

=== Bundesliga ===
==== League table ====
Pos	Team	Pld	W	D	L	GF	GA	GD	Pts	Qualification or relegation
4	Union Berlin	34	18	8	8	51	38	+13	62	Qualification for the Champions League group stage
5	SC Freiburg	34	17	8	9	51	44	+7	59	Qualification for the Europa League group stage (Note: Since the 2022–23 DFB-Pokal winners, RB Leipzig, qualified for the Champions League based on league position, the Europa League group stage spot was passed to the sixth-placed team, and the Europa Conference League play-off round spot was passed to the seventh-placed team.)
6	Bayer Leverkusen	34	14	8	12	57	49	+8	50	Qualification for the Europa League group stage
7	Eintracht Frankfurt	34	13	11	10	58	52	+6	50	Qualification for the Europa Conference League play-off round
8	VfL Wolfsburg	34	13	10	11	57	48	+9	49	

Source: DFB
Rules for classification: 1) Points; 2) Goal difference; 3) Goals scored; 4) Head-to-head results; 5) Head-to-head away goals scored; 6) Away goals scored; 7) Play-off.

==== Results summary ====
Overall								Home						Away					
Pld	W	D	L	GF	GA	GD	Pts	W	D	L	GF	GA	GD	W	D	L	GF	GA	GD
34	14	8	12	57	49	+8	50	8	3	6	35	23	+12	6	5	6	22	26	−4

Source: DFB

==== Results by round ====
Round	1	2	3	4	5	6	7	8	9	10	11	12	13	14	15	16	17	18	19	20	21	22	23	24	25	26	27	28	29	30	31	32	33	34
Ground	A	H	H	A	H	A	H	A	H	A	H	A	H	A	H	A	H	H	A	A	H	A	H	A	H	A	H	A	H	A	H	A	H	A
Result	L	L	L	W	L	D	D	L	W	L	D	L	W	W	W	W	W	L	L	W	L	D	W	W	W	W	W	D	W	D	L	D	D	L
Position	13	18	17	13	14	17	15	17	15	16	15	16	14	13	12	9	8	9	10	8	10	11	9	9	8	7	6	6	6	6	6	7	6	6

Source: DFB
A = Away; H = Home; W = Win; D = Draw; L = Loss

==== Matches ====
The league fixtures were announced on 17 June 2022.

6 August 2022 1	Borussia Dortmund	1–0	Bayer Leverkusen	Dortmund
15:30 CEST (UTC+2)	Reus 10'; Hazard (yellow card) 43'; Schlotterbeck (yellow card) 72'	Report	Tah (yellow card) 27'; Palacios (yellow card) 37'; Hincapié (yellow card) 56'; Hradecky (red card) 90+2'; Bakker (yellow card) 90+5'	Stadium: Signal Iduna Park; Attendance: 81,365; Referee: Felix Brych

13 August 2022 2	Bayer Leverkusen	1–2	FC Augsburg	Leverkusen
15:30 CEST (UTC+2)	Aránguiz 43'; Azmoun (yellow card) 79'	Report	Jensen 15'; Valentin (yellow card) 35'; Demirović (yellow card) 42'; Gouweleeuw (yellow card) 70'; Rexhbeçaj (yellow card) 75'; Gikiewicz (yellow card) 82'; Hahn 82'; Bauer (yellow card) 89'	Stadium: BayArena; Attendance: 22,903; Referee: Benjamin Cortus

20 August 2022 3	Bayer Leverkusen	0–3	1899 Hoffenheim	Leverkusen
15:30 CEST (UTC+2)	Diaby (yellow card) 56'	Report	Baumgartner 9'; Kramarić 34'; Kabak (yellow card) 57'; Rutter (yellow card) 74', (goal) 78'; Akpoguma (yellow card) 86'	Stadium: BayArena; Attendance: 26,300; Referee: Tobias Reichel

27 August 2022 4	Mainz 05	0–3	Bayer Leverkusen	Mainz
15:30 CEST (UTC+2)	Burgzorg (yellow card) 70'	Report	Hincapié (yellow card) 3' (yellow-red card) 77'; Palacios 29'; Frimpong 39', 41', (yellow card) 60'; Andrich (yellow card) 45'; Bakker (yellow card) 77' (yellow-red card) 90+4'	Stadium: Mewa Arena; Attendance: 28,500; Referee: Christian Dingert

3 September 2022 5	Bayer Leverkusen	2–3	SC Freiburg	Leverkusen
15:30 CEST (UTC+2)	Tah (yellow card) 5'; Demirbay 16'; Schick 65'; Amiri (yellow card) 82'	Report	Höfler (yellow card) 34'; Ginter 48'; Gregoritsch 50', (yellow card) 53'; Dōan 71'	Stadium: BayArena; Attendance: 26,853; Referee: Sascha Stegemann

10 September 2022 6	Hertha BSC	2–2	Bayer Leverkusen	Berlin
15:30 CEST (UTC+2)	Serdar (yellow card) 26', (goal) 55'; Šunjić (yellow card) 48'; Richter 74'; Selke (yellow card) 86'	Report	Demirbay 49'; Aránguiz (yellow card) 52'; Schick 79'	Stadium: Olympiastadion; Attendance: 40,643; Referee: Benjamin Brand

17 September 2022 7	Bayer Leverkusen	1–1	Werder Bremen	Leverkusen
15:30 CEST (UTC+2)	Demirbay (yellow card) 24', (goal) 57'; Tah (yellow card) 90+6'	Report	Schmid (yellow card) 26'; Veljković 82'; Pieper (yellow card) 88'; Weiser (yellow card) 90+6'	Stadium: BayArena; Attendance: 30,210; Referee: Tobias Welz

30 September 2022 8	Bayern Munich	4–0	Bayer Leverkusen	Munich
20:30 CEST (UTC+2)	Sané 3'; Musiala 17'; Mané 39'; Müller 84'	Report		Stadium: Allianz Arena; Attendance: 75,000; Referee: Tobias Stieler

8 October 2022 9	Bayer Leverkusen	4–0	Schalke 04	Leverkusen
15:30 CEST (UTC+2)	Diaby 38'; Frimpong 41', 52'; Hincapié (yellow card) 55'; Paulinho 90'	Report	Yoshida (yellow card) 13'	Stadium: BayArena; Attendance: 30,210; Referee: Tobias Reichel

15 October 2022 10	Eintracht Frankfurt	5–1	Bayer Leverkusen	Frankfurt
15:30 CEST (UTC+2)	Kamada 45+5' (pen.), 72' (pen.); Kolo Muani 58'; Lindstrøm 65'; Alario 86'	Report	Andrich (yellow card) 11'; Hincapié (yellow card) 42' (yellow-red card) 76', (goal) 56'; Tapsoba (yellow card) 45'	Stadium: Deutsche Bank Park; Attendance: 49,700; Referee: Frank Willenborg

22 October 2022 11	Bayer Leverkusen	2–2	VfL Wolfsburg	Leverkusen
15:30 CEST (UTC+2)	Diaby (penalty missed) 10', 17'; Tah (yellow card) 49'; Frimpong 75'; Andrich (yellow card) 80'; Fosu-Mensah (yellow card) 90'	Report	Andrich 28' (o.g.); Arnold 54' (pen.); F. Nmecha (yellow card) 60'	Stadium: BayArena; Attendance: 26,294; Referee: Felix Brych

29 October 2022 12	RB Leipzig	2–0	Bayer Leverkusen	Leipzig
15:30 CEST (UTC+2)	Nkunku 32'; Kampl (yellow card) 35'; Diallo (yellow card) 76'; Werner 83'; Henrichs (yellow card) 86'	Report	Tapsoba (yellow card) 26'; Hincapié (yellow card) 31'	Stadium: Red Bull Arena; Attendance: 45,598; Referee: Sven Jablonski

6 November 2022 13	Bayer Leverkusen	5–0	Union Berlin	Leverkusen
15:30 CET (UTC+1)	Amiri (yellow card) 19'; Andrich 46'; Diaby 56', 58'; Hložek 68'; Bakker 76'	Report	Khedira (yellow card) 24'; Pefok (yellow card) 26'; Thorsby (yellow card) 41'; Leite (yellow card) 85'	Stadium: BayArena; Attendance: 30,210; Referee: Robert Schröder

9 November 2022 14	1. FC Köln	1–2	Bayer Leverkusen	Cologne
18:30 CET (UTC+1)	Schmitz 30'; Thielmann (yellow card) 84'	Report	Amiri 65'; Diaby 71'; Andrich (yellow card) 84'; Demirbay (yellow card) 89'	Stadium: RheinEnergieStadion; Attendance: 50,000; Referee: Tobias Stieler

12 November 2022 15	Bayer Leverkusen	2–0	VfB Stuttgart	Leverkusen
15:30 CET (UTC+1)	Diaby 30'; Amiri (yellow card) 69'; Tah 82'; Hložek (yellow card) 90+2'	Report	Zagadou (yellow card) 39'; Führich (yellow card) 61'; Tomás (yellow card) 65'	Stadium: BayArena; Attendance: 30,210; Referee: Florian Badstübner

22 January 2023 16	Borussia Mönchengladbach	2–3	Bayer Leverkusen	Mönchengladbach
17:30 CET (UTC+1)	Koné (yellow card) 44'; Stindl 82', 90+3', (yellow card) 90+6'; Weigl (yellow card) 89'	Report	Bakker 21', (yellow card) 90+6'; Adli 43'; Amiri 67'; Sinkgraven (yellow card) 90+5'	Stadium: Borussia-Park; Attendance: 53,336; Referee: Harm Osmers

25 January 2023 17	Bayer Leverkusen	2–0	VfL Bochum	Leverkusen
20:30 CET (UTC+1)	Tapsoba 8' (pen.); Diaby (yellow card) 39'; Andrich (yellow card) 45'; Hložek 53'	Report	Soares (yellow card) 51'; Mašović (yellow card) 61'; Osei-Tutu (yellow card) 71'; Lampropoulos (yellow card) 81'	Stadium: BayArena; Attendance: 25,820; Referee: Timo Gerach

29 January 2023 18	Bayer Leverkusen	0–2	Borussia Dortmund	Leverkusen
15:30 CET (UTC+1)	Tapsoba (yellow card) 28'; Wirtz (yellow card) 60'	Report	Adeyemi 33', (yellow card) 34'; Tapsoba 53' (o.g.); Özcan (yellow card) 60'; Modeste (yellow card) 84'; Ryerson (yellow card) 90'	Stadium: BayArena; Attendance: 30,210; Referee: Tobias Welz

3 February 2023 19	FC Augsburg	1–0	Bayer Leverkusen	Augsburg
20:30 CET (UTC+1)	Beljo (yellow card) 37'; Berisha 55'; Maier (yellow card) 59'; Engels (yellow card) 72'	Report	Hincapié (yellow card) 27'; Adli (yellow card) 60'	Stadium: WWK Arena; Attendance: 27,318; Referee: Marco Fritz

11 February 2023 20	1899 Hoffenheim	1–3	Bayer Leverkusen	Sinsheim
15:30 CET (UTC+1)	Geiger (yellow card) 28'; Brooks (yellow card) 36'; Akpoguma (yellow card) 50'; Nsoki 77'	Report	Andrich 6'; Frimpong (yellow card) 28'; Diaby 47'; Hložek 56'	Stadium: PreZero Arena; Attendance: 20,619; Referee: Tobias Stieler

19 February 2023 21	Bayer Leverkusen	2–3	Mainz 05	Leverkusen
19:30 CET (UTC+1)	Tapsoba (penalty missed) 23'; Amiri 32'; Schick 58'; Hincapié (yellow card) 62'; Adli (red card) 81'; Frimpong (yellow card) 83'; Tah (yellow card) 87'; Hložek (yellow card) 88'; Andrich (yellow card) 88'	Report	Caci 26'; Bell (yellow card) 45'; Barreiro 45+4', (yellow card) 79'; Hanche-Olsen (yellow card) 55'; Ingvartsen 82' (pen.); Kohr (yellow card) 87'	Stadium: BayArena; Attendance: 27,002; Referee: Robert Schröder

26 February 2023 22	SC Freiburg	1–1	Bayer Leverkusen	Freiburg
15:30 CET (UTC+1)	Sallai (yellow card) 26'; Grifo 29'; Gregoritsch (yellow card) 33'	Report	Demirbay (yellow card) 27'; Azmoun 67'	Stadium: Europa-Park Stadion; Attendance: 34,000; Referee: Daniel Siebert

5 March 2023 23	Bayer Leverkusen	4–1	Hertha BSC	Leverkusen
15:30 CET (UTC+1)	Azmoun 12'; Frimpong 21'; Diaby 60'; Adli 73'; Tah (yellow card) 75'	Report	Lukebakio 67' (pen.); Ngankam (yellow card) 75'; Kenny (yellow card) 87'	Stadium: BayArena; Attendance: 30,210; Referee: Patrick Ittrich

12 March 2023 24	Werder Bremen	2–3	Bayer Leverkusen	Bremen
17:30 CET (UTC+1)	Ducksch 30'; Stark (yellow card) 76'; Schmidt (yellow card) 79'; Füllkrug 86' (pen.)	Report	Bakker 34'; Frimpong 56'; Hložek 83'; Kossounou (yellow card) 89'	Stadium: Wohninvest Weserstadion; Attendance: 41,000; Referee: Deniz Aytekin

19 March 2023 25	Bayer Leverkusen	2–1	Bayern Munich	Leverkusen
17:30 CET (UTC+1)	Frimpong (yellow card) 39'; Palacios 55' (pen.), 73' (pen.); Hincapié (yellow card) 83'	Report	Kimmich 22'; Pavard (yellow card) 43'; Stanišić (yellow card) 64'; Upamecano (yellow card) 73'	Stadium: BayArena; Attendance: 30,210; Referee: Tobias Stieler

1 April 2023 26	Schalke 04	0–3	Bayer Leverkusen	Gelsenkirchen
15:30 CEST (UTC+2)	Matriciani (yellow card) 51'; Balanta (yellow card) 56'	Report	Palacios (yellow card) 39'; Frimpong 50'; Wirtz 61'; Azmoun 90+2'	Stadium: Veltins-Arena; Attendance: 62,271; Referee: Deniz Aytekin

8 April 2023 27	Bayer Leverkusen	3–1	Eintracht Frankfurt	Leverkusen
15:30 CEST (UTC+2)	Adli 10'; Diaby 34'; Tapsoba (yellow card) 44'; Azmoun 90+5'	Report	Götze (yellow card) 42'; Borré (yellow card) 45+1'; Knauff (yellow card) 48'; Sow 74'; Dina Ebimbe (yellow card) 89'; Jakić (yellow card) 90+1'	Stadium: BayArena; Attendance: 30,210; Referee: Robert Hartmann

16 April 2023 28	VfL Wolfsburg	0–0	Bayer Leverkusen	Wolfsburg
19:30 CEST (UTC+2)		Report	Amiri (yellow card) 61'; Hincapié (yellow card) 72'; Kossounou (yellow card) 77'; Diaby (yellow card) 85'; Wirtz (yellow card) 88'	Stadium: Volkswagen Arena; Attendance: 20,137; Referee: Sascha Stegemann

23 April 2023 29	Bayer Leverkusen	2–0	RB Leipzig	Leverkusen
17:30 CEST (UTC+2)	Hložek 40'; Hincapié (yellow card) 70'; Amiri 86' (pen.), (yellow card) 87'; Andrich (yellow card) 89'	Report	Szoboszlai (yellow card) 67' (yellow-red card) 85'; Simakan (yellow card) 70'; Haidara (yellow card) 71'; Laimer (yellow card) 75'	Stadium: BayArena; Attendance: 29,085; Referee: Daniel Schlager

29 April 2023 30	Union Berlin	0–0	Bayer Leverkusen	Berlin
15:30 CEST (UTC+2)	Leite (yellow card) 64'	Report	Kossounou (yellow card) 74'	Stadium: Stadion An der Alten Försterei; Attendance: 22,012; Referee: Marco Fritz

5 May 2023 31	Bayer Leverkusen	1–2	1. FC Köln	Leverkusen
20:30 CEST (UTC+2)	Adli 28', (yellow card) 80'	Report	Selke 14', 36', (yellow card) 71'; Thielmann (yellow card) 45'; Olesen (yellow card) 69'; Chabot (yellow card) 80'; Maina (yellow card) 80'; Schmitz (yellow card) 83'	Stadium: BayArena; Attendance: 30,210; Referee: Felix Zwayer

14 May 2023 32	VfB Stuttgart	1–1	Bayer Leverkusen	Stuttgart
15:30 CEST (UTC+2)	Guirassy 57' (pen.); Anton (yellow card) 64'; Bredlow (yellow card) 68'; Coulibaly (yellow card) 70'	Report	Bakker (yellow card) 50'; Hincapié (yellow card) 60'; Palacios 70' (pen.); Wirtz (yellow card) 75'; Demirbay (yellow card) 90'	Stadium: Mercedes-Benz Arena; Attendance: 46,300; Referee: Frank Willenborg

21 May 2023 33	Bayer Leverkusen	2–2	Borussia Mönchengladbach	Leverkusen
19:30 CEST (UTC+2)	Adli 15'; Demirbay 20', (yellow card) 45'; Palacios (yellow card) 77'; Amiri (yellow card) 81'; Hincapié (red card) 90+4'	Report	Koné (yellow card) 35'; Friedrich (yellow card) 47'; Hofmann 58'; Stindl (yellow card) 70', (goal) 90'	Stadium: BayArena; Attendance: 30,210; Referee: Daniel Siebert

27 May 2023 34	VfL Bochum	3–0	Bayer Leverkusen	Bochum
15:30 CEST (UTC+2)	Förster 19', (yellow card) 28'; Stöger (yellow card) 21', (goal) 86'; Asano 34'; Hofmann (yellow card) 73'; Osterhage (yellow card) 84'; Zoller (yellow card) 89'	Report	Adli (red card) 8'; Tapsoba (yellow card) 63'; Wirtz (yellow card) 66'; Bakker (yellow card) 69'; Diaby (yellow card) 71'; Palacios (yellow card) 89'	Stadium: Vonovia Ruhrstadion; Attendance: 26,000; Referee: Tobias Welz

=== DFB-Pokal ===
30 July 2022 First round	SV Elversberg	4–3	Bayer Leverkusen	Spiesen-Elversberg
15:31 CEST (UTC+2)	Rochelt 2'; Koffi 17' (pen.); Schnellbacher 37'; Conrad 74'; Mustafa (yellow card) 90+5'	Report	Hložek 5'; Aránguiz 30'; Diaby (yellow card) 64'; Schick 89'; Demirbay (yellow card) 90+5'	Stadium: Waldstadion an der Kaiserlinde; Attendance: 7,500; Referee: Martin Petersen

=== UEFA Champions League ===
==== Group stage ====
The draw for the group stage was held on 25 August 2022.

Pos	Team	Pld	W	D	L	GF	GA	GD	Pts	Qualification	POR	BRU	LEV	ATM
1	(Portugal) Porto	6	4	0	2	12	7	+5	12	Advance to knockout phase	—	0–4	2–0	2–1
2	(Belgium) Club Brugge	6	3	2	1	7	4	+3	11	Advance to knockout phase	0–4	—	1–0	2–0
3	(Germany) Bayer Leverkusen	6	1	2	3	4	8	−4	5 (Note: Head-to-head points: Bayer Leverkusen 4, Atlético Madrid 1.)	Transfer to Europa League	0–3	0–0	—	2–0
4	(Spain) Atlético Madrid	6	1	2	3	5	9	−4	5		2–1	0–0	2–2	—

Source: UEFA
Rules for classification: Group stage tiebreakers
Notes:

7 September 2022 1	Club Brugge (Belgium)	1–0	(Germany) Bayer Leverkusen	Bruges, Belgium
21:00 CEST (UTC+2)	Sylla 42'; Sowah (yellow card) 78'	Report	Palacios (yellow card) 59'; Andrich (yellow card) 62'; Demirbay (yellow card) 68'	Stadium: Jan Breydel Stadium; Attendance: 21,235; Referee: Irfan Peljto (Bosnia and Herzegovina)

13 September 2022 2	Bayer Leverkusen (Germany)	2–0	(Spain) Atlético Madrid	Leverkusen, Germany
21:00 CEST (UTC+2)	Kossounou (yellow card) 32'; Tah (yellow card) 39'; Andrich (yellow card) 77', (goal) 84'; Diaby 87'	Report		Stadium: BayArena; Attendance: 25,825; Referee: Michael Oliver (England)

4 October 2022 3	Porto (Portugal)	2–0	(Germany) Bayer Leverkusen	Porto, Portugal
21:00 CEST (UTC+2)	João Mário (yellow card) 50'; Uribe (yellow card) 61'; Sanusi 69'; Galeno 87'; Carmo (yellow card) 90+1'	Report	Hincapié (yellow card) 40'; Schick (penalty missed) 45'; Frimpong (yellow card) 53' (yellow-red card) 88'; Andrich (yellow card) 56'	Stadium: Estádio do Dragão; Attendance: 42,399; Referee: Anthony Taylor (England)

12 October 2022 4	Bayer Leverkusen (Germany)	0–3	(Portugal) Porto	Leverkusen, Germany
21:00 CEST (UTC+2)	Demirbay (penalty missed) 16'; Hincapié (yellow card) 63'; Bakker (yellow card) 65'; Paulinho (yellow card) 84'	Report	Galeno 6'; João Mário (yellow card) 32'; Taremi 53' (pen.), 64' (pen.); Borges (yellow card) 90+3'	Stadium: BayArena; Attendance: 30,210; Referee: István Kovács (Romania)

26 October 2022 5	Atlético Madrid (Spain)	2–2	(Germany) Bayer Leverkusen	Madrid, Spain
21:00 CEST (UTC+2)	Carrasco 22', (penalty missed) 90+9'; De Paul 50'; Giménez (yellow card) 79'; Kondogbia (yellow card) 87'	Report	Diaby 9'; Hudson-Odoi 29'; Hradecky (yellow card) 65'; Bakker (yellow card) 66'; Hincapié (yellow card) 78'	Stadium: Metropolitano Stadium; Attendance: 63,803; Referee: Clément Turpin (France)

1 November 2022 6	Bayer Leverkusen (Germany)	0–0	(Belgium) Club Brugge	Leverkusen, Germany
18:45 CET (UTC+1)	Palacios (yellow card) 43'; Andrich (yellow card) 63'	Report	Sobol (yellow card) 36'; Boyata (yellow card) 82'; Nielsen (yellow card) 84'	Stadium: BayArena; Attendance: 30,210; Referee: Maurizio Mariani (Italy)

=== UEFA Europa League ===
==== Knockout phase ====
===== Knockout round play-offs =====
The draw for the knockout round play-offs was held on 7 November 2022.

16 February 2023 First leg	Bayer Leverkusen (Germany)	2–3	(France) Monaco	Leverkusen, Germany
21:00 CET (UTC+1)	Tapsoba (yellow card) 14'; Diaby 48'; Wirtz (yellow card) 50', (goal) 59'; Adli (yellow card) 64'	Report	Hradecky 9' (o.g.); Camara (yellow card) 63'; Diatta 74', (yellow card) 90+7'; Maripán (yellow card) 84'; Disasi 90+2'	Stadium: BayArena; Attendance: 27,864; Referee: Orel Grinfeld (Israel)

23 February 2023 Second leg	Monaco (France)	2–3 (a.e.t.) (5–5 agg.) (3–5 p)	(Germany) Bayer Leverkusen	Monaco
18:45 CET (UTC+1)	Ben Yedder 19' (pen.); Fofana (yellow card) 41'; Embolo 84'; Caio Henrique (yellow card) 119'; Jakobs (yellow card) 120'	Report	Wirtz 13'; Palacios 21', (yellow card) 99'; Adli 58'; Andrich (yellow card) 65'	Stadium: Stade Louis II; Attendance: 8,504; Referee: Alejandro Hernández Hernández (Spain)
	Penalties
	Disasi (penalty scored); Matazo (penalty missed); Embolo (penalty scored); Volland (penalty scored)		(penalty scored) Azmoun; (penalty scored) Amiri; (penalty scored) Tapsoba; (penalty scored) Schick; (penalty scored) Diaby

===== Round of 16 =====
The draw for the round of 16 was held on 24 February 2023.

9 March 2023 First leg	Bayer Leverkusen (Germany)	2–0	(Hungary) Ferencváros	Leverkusen, Germany
18:45 CET (UTC+1)	Demirbay 10', (yellow card) 38'; Wirtz (yellow card) 75'; Kossounou (yellow card) 83'; Tapsoba 86'	Report	Marquinhos (yellow card) 45'; Zachariassen (yellow card) 49'; Botka (yellow card) 75'; Ćivić (yellow card) 90+3'	Stadium: BayArena; Attendance: 25,001; Referee: Davide Massa (Italy)

16 March 2023 Second leg	Ferencváros (Hungary)	0–2 (0–4 agg.)	(Germany) Bayer Leverkusen	Budapest, Hungary
21:00 CET (UTC+1)		Report	Diaby 3'; Adli 81'	Stadium: Puskás Aréna; Attendance: 50,675; Referee: Artur Soares Dias (Portugal)

===== Quarter-finals =====
The draw for the quarter-finals was held on 17 March 2023.

13 April 2023 First leg	Bayer Leverkusen (Germany)	1–1	(Belgium) Union Saint-Gilloise	Leverkusen, Germany
21:00 CEST (UTC+2)	Hincapié (yellow card) 76'; Wirtz 82'	Report	Van der Heyden (yellow card) 25'; Boniface 51'; Lapoussin (yellow card) 84'; Moris (yellow card) 90+3'	Stadium: BayArena; Attendance: 30,210; Referee: Ivan Kružliak (Slovakia)

20 April 2023 Second leg	Union Saint-Gilloise (Belgium)	1–4 (2–5 agg.)	(Germany) Bayer Leverkusen	Brussels, Belgium
21:00 CEST (UTC+2)	Terho 64'; Teuma (yellow card) 75'	Report	Diaby 2'; Bakker 38'; Frimpong 60'; Hložek 79'	Stadium: Constant Vanden Stock Stadium; Attendance: 17,069; Referee: Antonio Mateu Lahoz (Spain)
Note: Union Saint-Gilloise played their home match at the Constant Vanden Stock Stadium in Brussels, instead of their regular stadium, the Joseph Marien Stadium in Brussels, which did not meet UEFA requirements.

===== Semi-finals =====
The draw for the semi-finals was held on 17 March 2023, after the draw for the quarter-finals.

11 May 2023 First leg	Roma (Italy)	1–0	(Germany) Bayer Leverkusen	Rome, Italy
21:00 CEST (UTC+2)	Mancini (yellow card) 58'; Bove 63'; Abraham (yellow card) 76'; Ibañez (yellow card) 89'; Spinazzola (yellow card) 90+3'	Report	Andrich (yellow card) 50'; Diaby (yellow card) 57'; Tah (yellow card) 58'	Stadium: Stadio Olimpico; Attendance: 63,123; Referee: Michael Oliver (England)

18 May 2023 Second leg	Bayer Leverkusen (Germany)	0–0 (0–1 agg.)	(Italy) Roma	Leverkusen, Germany
21:00 CEST (UTC+2)	Hincapié (yellow card) 45+3'; Palacios (yellow card) 56'; Bakker (yellow card) 70'; Diaby (yellow card) 90'; Tapsoba (yellow card) 90+7'	Report	Ibañez (yellow card) 70'; Cristante (yellow card) 89'; Abraham (yellow card) 90+9'	Stadium: BayArena; Attendance: 30,210; Referee: Slavko Vinčić (Slovenia)

== Statistics ==
=== Appearances and goals ===
No.	Pos	Nat	Player	Total		Bundesliga		DFB-Pokal		Champions League		Europa League	
No.	Pos	Nat	Player	Apps	Goals	Apps	Goals	Apps	Goals	Apps	Goals	Apps	Goals
Goalkeepers
1	GK	(Finland) FIN	Lukas Hradecky	48	0	33	0	1	0	6	0	8	0
28	GK	(Austria) AUT	Patrick Pentz	0	0	0	0	0	0	0	0	0	0
36	GK	(Germany) GER	Niklas Lomb	0	0	0	0	0	0	0	0	0	0
40	GK	(Russia) RUS	Andrey Lunyov	1	0	1	0	0	0	0	0	0	0
Defenders
3	DF	(Ecuador) ECU	Piero Hincapié	43	1	27+3	1	0	0	5	0	8	0
4	DF	(Germany) GER	Jonathan Tah	47	1	28+5	1	0	0	5+1	0	8	0
5	DF	(Netherlands) NED	Mitchel Bakker	40	4	19+9	3	1	0	4+1	0	5+1	1
6	DF	(Ivory Coast) CIV	Odilon Kossounou	35	0	17+7	0	1	0	5	0	2+3	0
12	DF	(Burkina Faso) BFA	Edmond Tapsoba	47	2	32+1	1	1	0	4+1	0	8	1
18	DF	(Belgium) BEL	Noah Mbamba	1	0	0+1	0	0	0	0	0	0	0
22	DF	(Netherlands) NED	Daley Sinkgraven	12	0	4+8	0	0	0	0	0	0	0
24	DF	(Netherlands) NED	Timothy Fosu-Mensah	15	0	1+10	0	0	0	0+3	0	0+1	0
30	DF	(Netherlands) NED	Jeremie Frimpong	48	9	32+2	8	1	0	4+1	0	8	1
Midfielders
8	MF	(Germany) GER	Robert Andrich	41	3	28+1	2	1	0	5	1	6	0
10	MF	(Germany) GER	Kerem Demirbay	36	5	17+8	4	0+1	0	2+3	0	2+3	1
11	MF	(Germany) GER	Nadiem Amiri	36	4	9+16	4	0	0	1+4	0	3+3	0
25	MF	(Argentina) ARG	Exequiel Palacios	34	5	19+6	4	0+1	0	1+1	0	6	1
27	MF	(Germany) GER	Florian Wirtz	25	4	11+6	1	0	0	0	0	8	3
32	MF	(Morocco) MAR	Ayman Azhil	1	0	0+1	0	0	0	0	0	0	0
32	MF	(Germany) GER	Joshua Eze	0	0	0	0	0	0	0	0	0	0
Forwards
9	FW	(Iran) IRI	Sardar Azmoun	33	4	8+15	4	1	0	0+2	0	3+4	0
14	FW	(Czech Republic) CZE	Patrik Schick	23	4	10+4	3	1	1	5	0	0+3	0
17	FW	(England) ENG	Callum Hudson-Odoi	21	1	7+7	0	0	0	6	1	0+1	0
19	FW	(France) FRA	Moussa Diaby	48	14	33	9	1	0	6	2	7+1	3
21	FW	(France) FRA	Amine Adli	38	7	16+10	5	0	0	1+3	0	2+6	2
23	FW	(Czech Republic) CZE	Adam Hložek	44	7	16+13	5	1	1	3+3	0	4+4	1
38	FW	(Germany) GER	Karim Bellarabi	10	0	1+7	0	0+1	0	0	0	0+1	0
Players transferred out during the season
7	FW	(Brazil) BRA	Paulinho	7	1	1+3	1	0+1	0	0+2	0	0	0
17	FW	(Finland) FIN	Joel Pohjanpalo	2	0	0+1	0	0+1	0	0	0	0	0
20	MF	(Chile) CHI	Charles Aránguiz	15	2	4+6	1	1	1	3+1	0	0	0
28	FW	(Spain) ESP	Iker Bravo	0	0	0	0	0	0	0	0	0	0
29	MF	(Denmark) DEN	Zidan Sertdemir	0	0	0	0	0	0	0	0	0	0

Source: Competitions

=== Goalscorers ===
Rank	Pos.	No.	Nat.	Player	Bundesliga	DFB-Pokal	Champions League	Europa League	Total
1	FW	19	(France)	Moussa Diaby	9	0	2	3	14
2	DF	30	(Netherlands)	Jeremie Frimpong	8	0	0	1	9
3	FW	21	(France)	Amine Adli	5	0	0	2	7
3	FW	23	(Czech Republic)	Adam Hložek	5	1	0	1	7
5	MF	10	(Germany)	Kerem Demirbay	4	0	0	1	5
5	MF	25	(Argentina)	Exequiel Palacios	4	0	0	1	5
7	DF	5	(Netherlands)	Mitchel Bakker	3	0	0	1	4
7	FW	9	(Iran)	Sardar Azmoun	4	0	0	0	4
7	MF	11	(Germany)	Nadiem Amiri	4	0	0	0	4
7	FW	14	(Czech Republic)	Patrik Schick	3	1	0	0	4
7	MF	27	(Germany)	Florian Wirtz	1	0	0	3	4
12	MF	8	(Germany)	Robert Andrich	2	0	1	0	3
13	DF	12	(Burkina Faso)	Edmond Tapsoba	1	0	0	1	2
13	MF	20	(Chile)	Charles Aránguiz	1	1	0	0	2
15	DF	3	(Ecuador)	Piero Hincapié	1	0	0	0	1
15	DF	4	(Germany)	Jonathan Tah	1	0	0	0	1
15	FW	7	(Brazil)	Paulinho	1	0	0	0	1
15	FW	17	(England)	Callum Hudson-Odoi	0	0	1	0	1
Own goals					0	0	0	0	0
Totals					57	3	4	14	78
