= Mikael Baza =

German footballer (born 2010)

Personal information
- Full name: Mikael Gueada Yaotl Baza
- Date of birth: 12 January 2010 (age 16)
- Place of birth: Germany
- Height: 1.90 m (6 ft 3 in)
- Position: Defender

Team information
- Current team: Barcelona

Youth career
- –2024: FC Süderelbe
- 2024–2026: Hamburger SV
- 2026–: Barcelona

Senior career*
Years	Team	Apps	(Gls)
2026	Hamburger SV II	1	(0)

International career^{‡}
2025–	Germany U16	11	(0)
- * Club domestic league appearances and goals ‡ National team caps and goals as of 30 March 2026

Mikael Gueada Yaotl Baza (born 12 January 2010) is a German professional footballer who plays as a defender for La Liga club Barcelona.

== Early life ==
Baza was born on 12 January 2010. Born in Germany, he is of Ivorian descent through his parents and is the cousin of Germany international Jonathan Tah.

== Club career ==
As a youth player, Baza joined the youth academy of FC Süderelbe. Following his stint there, he joined the youth academy of Hamburger SV during the summer of 2024, where he was regarded to have established himself as a regular starter while playing for the club's under-17 team and was promoted to their reserve team ahead of the 2026–27 season, where he made one league appearance and scored zero goals.

On 7 August 2026, he debuted for them during a 3–2 away loss to Kickers Emden in the league. Subsequently, he joined the youth academy of Spanish La Liga side Barcelona in 2026.

== International career ==
Baza has represented Germany internationally at youth level and has represented the country internationally at under-16 level and captained the team. Besides Germany, he is eligible to represent Ivory Coast internationally through his parents.

On 11 October 2025, he debuted for the Germany national under-16 football team during a 7–0 home friendly win over the Romania national under-16 football team. On 15 November 2025, he first started for the Germany national under-16 football team during a 1–1 away friendly draw with the Denmark national under-16 football team.

== Style of play ==
Baza plays as a defender and is left-footed. Spanish newspaper Sport wrote in 2026 "in addition to his imposing stature, the Hamburg academy product stands out for his speed".
