= Callum Hudson-Odoi =

English footballer (born 2000)

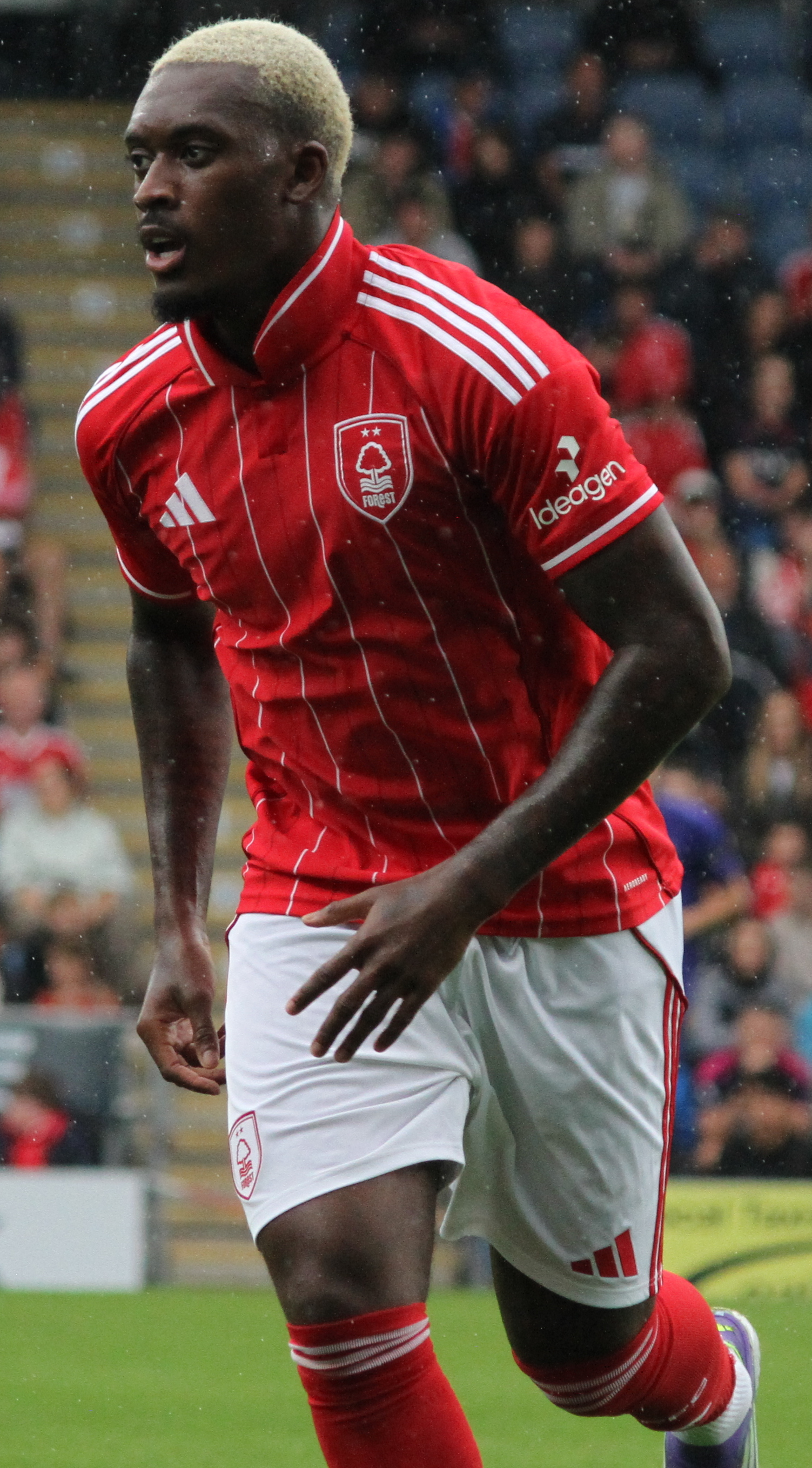
- Hudson-Odoi playing for Nottingham Forest in 2025

Personal information
- Full name: Callum James Hudson-Odoi
- Date of birth: 7 November 2000 (age 26)
- Place of birth: Wandsworth, England
- Height: 5 ft 9 in (1.75 m)
- Position: Winger

Team information
- Current team: Nottingham Forest
- Number: 7

Youth career
- 2006–2007: Charlton Athletic
- 2007–2018: Chelsea

Senior career*
Years	Team	Apps	(Gls)
2018–2023	Chelsea	72	(4)
2022–2023	→ Bayer Leverkusen (loan)	14	(0)
2023–	Nottingham Forest	94	(16)

International career
2015–2016	England U16	4	(0)
2016–2017	England U17	23	(6)
2018	England U18	2	(1)
2018	England U19	7	(2)
2019–2021	England U21	9	(4)
2019	England	3	(0)
Medal record
Men's football
Representing England
FIFA U-17 World Cup
Winner	2017
UEFA European Under-17 Championship
Runner-up	2017
- * Club domestic league appearances and goals as of 22:02, 23 October 2026 (UTC)

Callum James Hudson-Odoi (born 7 November 2000) is an English professional footballer who plays as a winger for Premier League club Nottingham Forest.

During his time with Chelsea's academy, Hudson-Odoi was part of the squads which won the U18 Premier League in 2017 as well as back-to-back FA Youth Cup titles. His form at youth level was rewarded in January 2018 when he was handed his senior debut, making over 110 appearances for the club ever since. He was a member of the Chelsea team that won the UEFA Europa League in 2019, UEFA Champions League in 2021, and reached runners-up at two FA Cup finals (2020 and 2021). He moved to German side Bayer Leverkusen on loan for the 2022–23 season. Upon returning to Chelsea at the end of his loan deal, Hudson-Odoi signed for fellow Premier League side Nottingham Forest in September 2023.

Hudson-Odoi also enjoyed considerable success at youth level for England, being part of the squad which ended as runners-up in the UEFA European Under-17 Championship and which won the FIFA U-17 World Cup in the same year. In March 2019, he became the youngest player to debut in a competitive match for England, doing so in UEFA Euro 2020 qualifier against the Czech Republic.

== Early and personal life ==
Callum James Hudson-Odoi was born on 7 November 2000 in Wandsworth, Greater London, where he was raised. He is the second son of former Ghana international midfielder Bismark Odoi and younger brother of former Ghana youth international striker Bradley Hudson-Odoi He has a younger brother. Hudson-Odoi was educated at independent Whitgift School in Croydon.

On 20 April 2026 Hudson-Odoi was fined for failing to tax his McLaren 675LT sports car.

== Club career ==
=== Chelsea ===
==== Early career ====
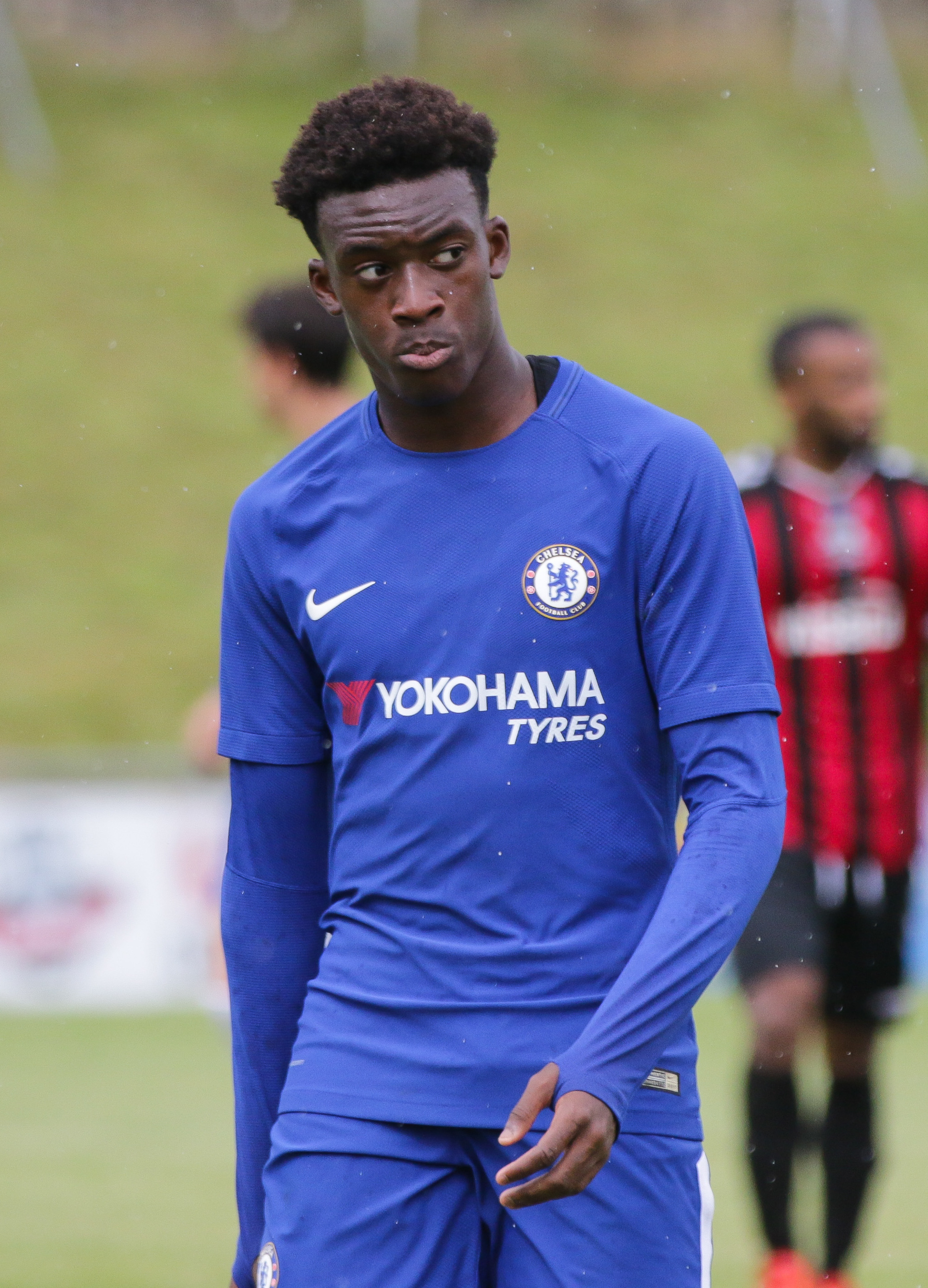
Hudson-Odoi playing for Chelsea in 2017

Hudson-Odoi joined Chelsea in 2007 from Charlton Athletic and made his under-18 debut in August 2016. He went on to net eight times in twenty-five appearances in his debut campaign, assisting the under-18s to their eight FA Youth Cup triumph. Following this, Hudson-Odoi was promoted to the under-23 team at the age of sixteen and went on to score four times in three games during their EFL Trophy campaign, including a double in their 2–2 draw with League One team Plymouth Argyle.

On 20 December 2017, Hudson-Odoi first appeared in Chelsea's matchday squad in their EFL Cup tie against AFC Bournemouth, remaining as an unused substitute in the 2–1 victory. On 28 January 2018, Hudson-Odoi made his first-team debut in the FA Cup match against Newcastle United. He came off the bench in the 81st minute, replacing Pedro in a 3–0 home victory. His Premier League debut came as a substitute on 31 January in a 3–0 home loss to Bournemouth.

==== 2018–19 season ====
Following an impressive 2018–19 pre-season under the newly appointed Maurizio Sarri, the Italian announced that Hudson-Odoi would stay with the Chelsea first-team squad for the forthcoming campaign. Following this, Hudson-Odoi was handed the number 20 jersey. On 5 August 2018, Hudson-Odoi made his first start for the club during their FA Community Shield defeat to Manchester City, featuring for 59 minutes in the 2–0 loss. In his first Europa League start against PAOK, he scored his first goal for the senior team, which went on to win 4–0 at home on 29 November.

On 5 January 2019, in Chelsea's FA Cup third-round opener against Nottingham Forest, he assisted both of Álvaro Morata's goals in a 2–0 win. During the January transfer window Hudson-Odoi was reportedly the subject of multiple transfer bids from Bayern Munich, with Chelsea's assistant manager Gianfranco Zola and Bayern's director of sport Hasan Salihamidžić both confirming the interest. Chelsea boss Maurizio Sarri criticised Bayern Munich's public conduct. On 26 January 2019, it was announced that Hudson-Odoi had put in an official transfer request. However, he was selected for Chelsea's next match the following day, a home tie in the FA Cup against Sheffield Wednesday. Hudson-Odoi played 90 minutes, scoring in a 3–0 win. Two days later, Sarri confirmed that Hudson-Odoi would be staying at the club.

In March 2019, Chelsea complained about alleged racism aimed at Hudson-Odoi during a match against Dynamo Kyiv. He was later offered counselling for the incident. On 3 April, he made his first league start for Chelsea and assisted Olivier Giroud for the opening goal in a 3–0 win over Brighton & Hove Albion. In doing so, he became the youngest player to assist a goal on his first start for the club in the Premier League era, aged 18 years and 146 days. On 22 April 2019, Hudson-Odoi was removed in the first half of a match against Burnley with an injury to his Achilles tendon, ruling him out for the rest of the season.

==== 2019–20 season ====
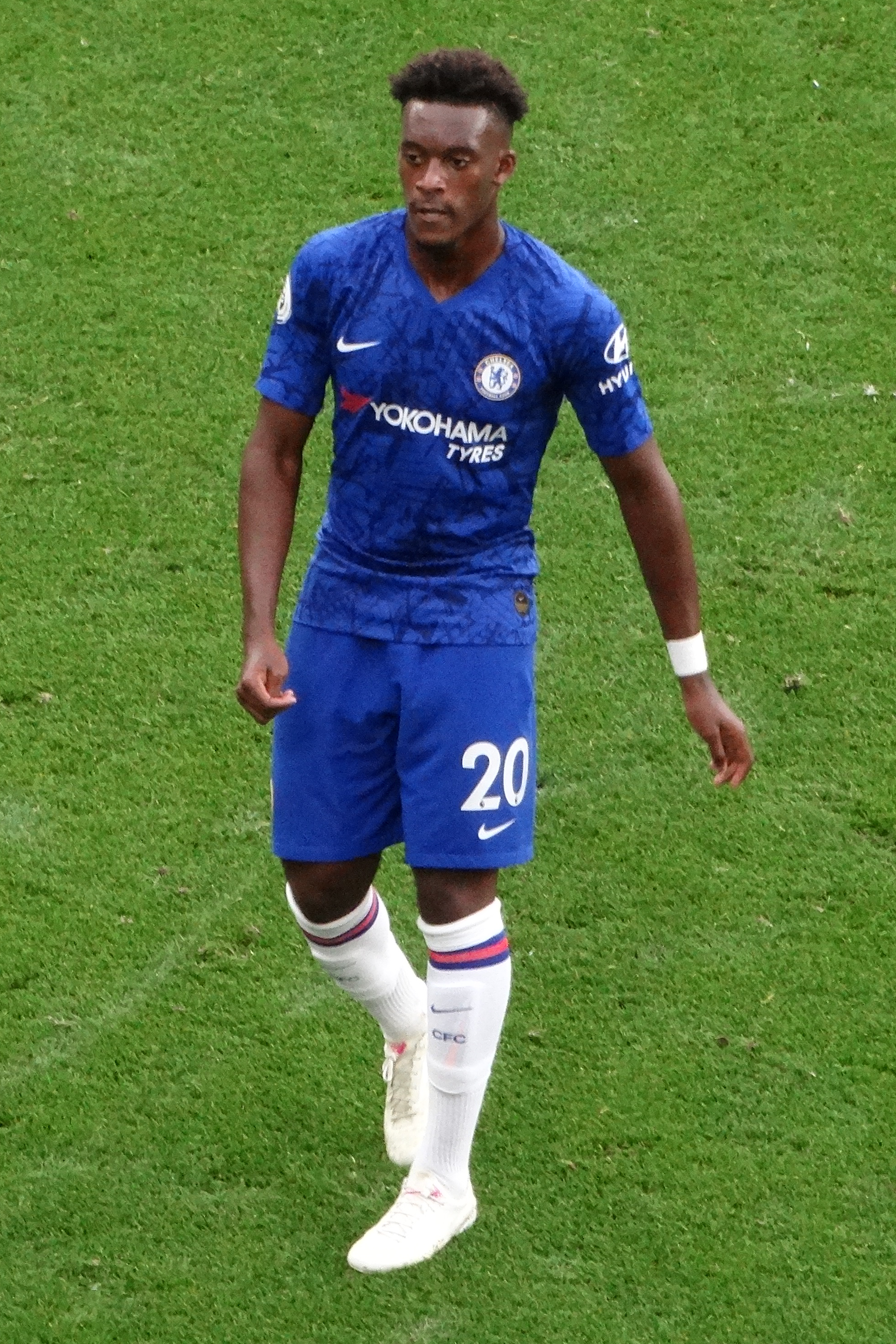
Hudson-Odoi playing for Chelsea in 2019

Hudson-Odoi was again pursued by Bayern Munich in the summer of 2019, with Chelsea rejecting a £22.5 million bid, compared to the £35 million offer in January.

In July 2019, after Frank Lampard was appointed as Chelsea head coach, Lampard said of Hudson-Odoi: "He can show, right here at Chelsea, the team he came through the academy at, that he is going to be a world-class player – because I truly believe that." Following much speculation about Hudson-Odoi's future, he signed a new five-year contract with Chelsea on 20 September 2019. In October 2019 he said he had made the right choice in staying with the club, and in November 2019 he said he was convinced to stay following a conversation with Lampard.

On 11 January 2020, he scored his first Premier League goal in Chelsea's 3–0 home win against Burnley.

==== 2020–21 season ====
Hudson-Odoi scored his first goal of the new season, coming off the bench to net Chelsea's second in an eventual 3–3 draw away to West Bromwich Albion on 26 September. Chelsea came back from 3–0 down to draw the match. A month later on 28 October, Hudson-Odoi scored his first-ever goal in the UEFA Champions League, opening the scoring in a 4–0 away win at Krasnodar.

Following the departure of Frank Lampard, and the subsequent appointment of Thomas Tuchel, Hudson-Odoi began playing more regularly. He started the first three matches under Tuchel, who immediately began to deploy him as a wing-back. Hudson-Odoi said "It was something new for me. It was my first time trying it [in training] and I felt alright playing in it, it wasn't a problem for me. It was good trying to play that position." Hudson-Odoi was named Man of the Match in Chelsea's 2–0 win against Burnley on 31 January 2021, also providing the assist for César Azpilicueta's goal.

On 20 February 2021, Hudson-Odoi was brought on as a half-time substitute replacing Tammy Abraham with Chelsea trailing 1–0 to Southampton. However, Tuchel opted to substitute Hudson-Odoi back off just 31 minutes after halftime, replacing him with Hakim Ziyech. Following the match, Tuchel said, "I was not happy with his attitude, energy and counter-pressing. I took him off and we demand 100%, I feel he is not in the right shape to help us. It was a hard decision but tomorrow it is forgotten." Tuchel reportedly apologized to Hudson-Odoi following the match, saying "Maybe it is even unfair, but it was my feeling." Hudson-Odoi went on to start the next match, a 1–0 win against Atlético Madrid in the Champions League. On 29 May, Hudson-Odoi was part of the Chelsea squad that beat Manchester City 1–0 in the 2021 Champions League final.

==== 2021–2023 ====
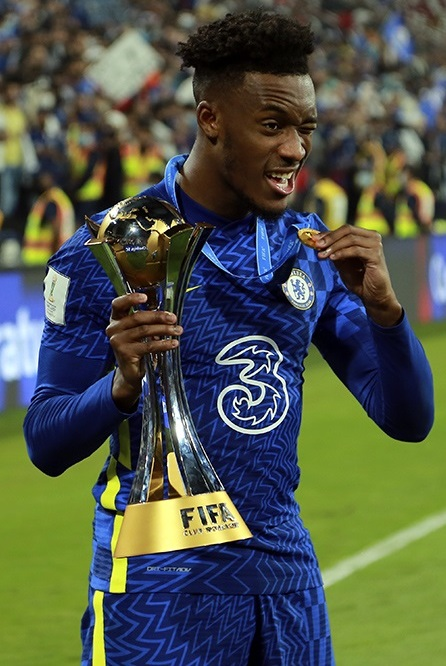
Hudson-Odoi with the FIFA Club World Cup trophy in 2022

On 23 October 2021, Hudson-Odoi scored his first goal of the season in Chelsea's 7–0 win against Norwich City.

On 30 August 2022, Hudson-Odoi joined Bundesliga club Bayer Leverkusen on a season-long loan. He scored his first goal for Leverkusen on 26 October in a 2–2 draw away to Atlético Madrid in the Champions League.

=== Nottingham Forest ===
On 1 September 2023, Hudson-Odoi signed for Premier League club Nottingham Forest on a three-year contract. The transfer fee was reported to be £3 million with a potential £2 million in add-ons. He scored on his debut on 18 September against Burnley in a 1–1 home draw. In February 2024, he scored in three consecutive Premier League matches; a 1–1 draw with Bournemouth, a 3–2 loss to Newcastle United and a 2–0 win over West Ham United. On 4 May, he scored twice in a 3–1 win against Sheffield United that ultimately ensured the team would avoid relegation. In the following fixture, Hudson-Odoi scored against his former club Chelsea to register his eighth goal of the 2023–24 Premier League season.

Hudson-Odoi's first goal of the 2024–25 Premier League season came on 14 September 2024, as he scored the only goal in a 1–0 away victory over Liverpool, securing his club's first win at Anfield since February 1969. On 30 August 2025, he extended his contract with the club until 2028.

== International career ==
Eligible for both England and Ghana, Hudson-Odoi has represented England at every age group from under-16 to under-19 level. In April 2017, he was included in the squad for the 2017 UEFA European Under-17 Championship. He scored in the semifinal against Turkey and again in the final, although England eventually lost to Spain on a penalty shoot-out. His performances led to him being included in the team of the tournament. Hudson-Odoi was also an influential figure during England's 2017 FIFA U-17 World Cup campaign, netting once in seven appearances and featuring for the entire 90 minutes during their 5–2 final victory over Spain.

He was called up by the England under-21 team for the first time in March 2019. A few days later, following injury to some of the senior squad players, he was called up to the senior squad for UEFA Euro 2020 qualifiers against Czech Republic and Montenegro. Upon receiving his maiden call-up, Hudson-Odoi said he was "shocked" and described it as "a dream come true". He made his debut on 22 March as a 70th-minute substitute in a 5–0 win over the Czech Republic at Wembley Stadium. Upon doing so, he became the youngest player to make his debut in a competitive match for England, aged 18 years and 135 days, breaking the record set by Duncan Edwards in 1955 by 40 days.

Three days later, he made his first competitive start for England and impressed in a 5–1 win over Montenegro, registering an assist for his Chelsea teammate Ross Barkley's two goals. Upon making his full debut, he became the second youngest player to start a competitive match for England, after Wayne Rooney in April 2003, and following the match manager Gareth Southgate praised him for his application.

Hudson-Odoi made his England under-21 debut on 11 October 2019 during a 2–2 draw against Slovenia in Maribor. In August 2021, Hudson-Odoi turned down the opportunity to play for the England under-21 team against Romania and Kosovo. His Chelsea manager questioned his decision.

== Career statistics ==
=== Club ===
As of match played 23 October 2026

Appearances and goals by club, season and competition
Club	Season	League			National cup (Note: Includes FA Cup)		League cup (Note: Includes EFL Cup)		Europe		Other		Total	
Club	Season	Division	Apps	Goals	Apps	Goals	Apps	Goals	Apps	Goals	Apps	Goals	Apps	Goals
Chelsea U23	2017–18	—			—		—		—		6 (Note: Appearance(s) in EFL Trophy)	4	6	4
Chelsea	2017–18	Premier League	2	0	2	0	0	0	0	0	0	0	4	0
Chelsea	2018–19	Premier League	10	0	2	1	2	0	9 (Note: Appearances in UEFA Europa League)	4	1 (Note: Appearance in FA Community Shield)	0	24	5
Chelsea	2019–20	Premier League	22	1	4	1	2	1	5 (Note: Appearances in UEFA Champions League)	0	0	0	33	3
Chelsea	2020–21	Premier League	23	2	5	1	2	0	7	2	—		37	5
Chelsea	2021–22	Premier League	15	1	3	1	3	0	5	1	2 (Note: One appearance in UEFA Super Cup, one appearance in FIFA Club World Cup)	0	28	3
Chelsea	Total		72	4	16	4	9	1	26	7	3	0	126	16
Bayer Leverkusen (loan)	2022–23	Bundesliga	14	0	—		—		7 (Note: Six appearances and one goal in UEFA Champions League, one appearance in UEFA Europa League)	1	—		21	1
Nottingham Forest	2023–24	Premier League	29	8	5	0	—		—		—		34	8
Nottingham Forest	2024–25	Premier League	31	5	4	0	1	0	—		—		36	5
Nottingham Forest	2025–26	Premier League	30	3	1	2	1	0	11	1	—		43	6
Nottingham Forest	2026–27	Premier League	4	0	0	0	1	0	—		—		5	0
Nottingham Forest	Total		94	16	10	2	3	0	11	1	—		118	19
Nottingham Forest U21	2023–24	—			—		—		—		1	0	1	0
Career total			180	20	26	6	12	1	44	9	10	4	272	40

=== International ===
Appearances and goals by national team and year
National team	Year	Apps	Goals
England	2019	3	0
Total		3	0

== Honours ==
Chelsea U18

- U18 Premier League: 2016–17
- FA Youth Cup: 2016–17, 2017–18

Chelsea

- UEFA Champions League: 2020–21
- UEFA Europa League: 2018–19
- UEFA Super Cup: 2021
- FIFA Club World Cup: 2021
- FA Cup runner-up: 2019–20, 2020–21
- EFL Cup runner-up: 2018–19, 2021–22

England U17

- FIFA U-17 World Cup: 2017
- UEFA European Under-17 Championship runner-up: 2017

Individual

- UEFA European Under-17 Championship Team of the Tournament: 2017
- Chelsea Young Player of the Year: 2018–19
