= List of Bayer 04 Leverkusen seasons =

This is a summary of the season results of the Bayer 04 Leverkusen football club across all competitions spanning from 1946 to the present.

== Key ==
Key to league record:

- Pld – Matches played
- W – Matches won
- D – Matches drawn
- L – Matches lost
- GF – Goals for
- GA – Goals against
- Pts – Points
- Pos – Final position

Key to colours and symbols:
Symbol	Meaning
1st or W	Championship winners
RU	Championship runners-up
↑	Promoted
↓	Relegated
EC	European Cup / Champions League
EC	UEFA Cup / Europa League
♦	Top league scorer in Bayer Leverkusen's division

Key to rounds:

- Prel. – Preliminary round
- QR1 – First qualifying round
- QR2 – Second qualifying round, etc.
- Inter – Intermediate round (between qualifying rounds and rounds proper)
- GS – Group stage
- 1R – First round
- 2R – Second round, etc.
- R64 – 1/32 Final (round of 64)
- R32 – 1/16 Final (round of 32)
- R16 – 1/8 Final (round of 16)
- QF – Quarter-finals
- SF – Semi-finals
- F – Final
- W – Winners
- DNE – Did not enter

== Seasons ==
Results of league and cup competitions by season
Season	Division	Pld	W	D	L	GF	GA	Pts	Pos	DFB-Pokal	DFL-Supercup	Cup	Result	Player(s)	Goals
Season	League									DFB-Pokal	DFL-Supercup	UEFA – FIFA		Top goalscorer(s)	
1946–47	Rheinbezirksliga (2)	30	12	6	12	49	61	30	11th	Not played				N/A	-
1947–48	Rheinbezirksliga (2)	24	-	-	-	48	44	25	5th	Not played				N/A	-
1948–49	Rheinbezirksliga (2)	26	-	-	-	79	29	41	1st	Not played				N/A	-
1949–50	Rheinbezirksliga (2)	30	-	-	-	56	39	35	5th	Not played				N/A	-
1950–51	Rheinbezirksliga (2)	30	-	-	-	69	36	47	1st ↑	Not played				N/A	-
1951–52	Oberliga (1)	30	10	12	8	49	41	32	6th	Not played				N/A	-
1952–53	Oberliga (1)	30	10	9	11	50	68	29	10th	DNE				N/A	-
1953–54	Oberliga (1)	30	13	5	12	58	67	31	7th	DNE				N/A	-
1954–55	Oberliga (1)	30	13	10	7	54	42	36	3rd	DNE				N/A	-
1955–56	Oberliga (1)	30	7	3	20	37	65	17	15th ↓	DNE				N/A	-
1956–57	2. Oberliga (2)	30	-	-	-	48	29	25	4th	DNE				N/A	-
1957–58	2. Oberliga (2)	30	-	-	-	68	39	38	4th	DNE				N/A	-
1958–59	2. Oberliga (2)	30	-	-	-	63	46	37	4th	DNE				N/A	-
1959–60	2. Oberliga (2)	30	-	-	-	58	52	31	5th	DNE				N/A	-
1961–62	2. Oberliga (2)	30	-	-	-	93	40	45	1st ↑	DNE				N/A	-
1962–63	Oberliga (1)	30	10	10	10	50	54	30	9th	DNE				Hans-Otto Peters	13
1963–64	Regionalliga (2)	38	13	9	16	62	62	35	12th	DNE				N/A	-
1964–65	Regionalliga (2)	38	8	10	16	48	55	25	16th	DNE				N/A	-
1965–66	Regionalliga (2)	38	9	8	17	49	75	26	14th	DNE				N/A	-
1966–67	Regionalliga (2)	34	12	8	14	57	62	32	10th	DNE				N/A	-
1967–68	Regionalliga (2)	34	22	8	4	70	32	52	1st	R32				N/A	-
1968–69	Regionalliga (2)	34	12	12	10	48	35	36	8th	DNE				N/A	-
1969–70	Regionalliga (2)	34	10	11	13	48	65	31	11th	DNE				N/A	-
1970–71	Regionalliga (2)	34	13	7	14	64	62	33	7th	DNE				N/A	-
1971–72	Regionalliga (2)	34	15	5	14	41	49	35	8th	R32				N/A	-
1972–73	Regionalliga (2)	34	6	7	21	38	76	19	17th ↓	DNE				N/A	-
1973–74	Verbandsliga (3)	28	-	-	-	65	30	39	1st	DNE				N/A	-
1974–75	Verbandsliga (3)	32	-	-	-	67	33	44	1st ↑	R32				N/A	-
1975–76	2. Bundesliga (2)	38	12	8	18	46	61	32	15th	R64				Wilfried Klinge	10
1976–77	2. Bundesliga (2)	38	14	12	12	59	58	40	10th	R32				Frank-Michael Schonert	18
1977–78	2. Bundesliga (2)	38	16	7	15	58	51	39	8th	R32				Dieter Herzog	14
1978–79	2. Bundesliga (2)	38	24	11	3	87	34	59	1st ↑	QF				Matthias Brücken	24
1979–80	Bundesliga (1)	34	12	8	14	45	61	32	12th	R64				Dietmar Demuth	10
1980–81	Bundesliga (1)	34	10	10	14	52	53	30	11th	R64				Arne Larsen Økland	16
1981–82	Bundesliga (1)	34	9	7	18	45	72	25	16th	R32				Arne Larsen Økland	19
1982–83	Bundesliga (1)	34	10	9	15	43	66	29	11th	R32				Arne Larsen Økland Herbert Waas	14
1983–84	Bundesliga (1)	34	13	8	13	50	50	34	7th	R32				Herbert Waas	15
1984–85	Bundesliga (1)	34	9	13	12	52	54	31	13th	QF				Cha Bum-kun Herbert Waas	14
1985–86	Bundesliga (1)	34	15	10	9	63	51	40	6th	QF				Cha Bum-kun	17
1986–87	Bundesliga (1)	34	16	7	11	56	38	39	6th	R32		UC	R32	Herbert Waas	18
1987–88	Bundesliga (1)	34	10	12	12	53	60	32	8th	R64		UC	W	Christian Schreier	14
1988–89	Bundesliga (1)	34	10	14	10	45	44	34	8th	SF		UC	R64	Christian Schreier	15
1989–90	Bundesliga (1)	34	12	15	7	40	32	39	5th	R64				Marek Leśniak	9
1990–91	Bundesliga (1)	34	11	13	10	47	46	35	8th	R32		UC	R16	Ulf Kirsten	15
1991–92	Bundesliga (1)	38	15	13	10	53	39	43	6th	SF				Andreas Thom	13
1992–93	Bundesliga (1)	34	14	12	8	64	45	40	5th	W				Ulf Kirsten ♦	23
1993–94	Bundesliga (1)	34	14	11	9	60	47	39	3rd	QF	RU	CWC	QF	Paulo Sérgio	21
1994–95	Bundesliga (1)	34	13	10	11	62	51	36	7th	R32		UC	SF	Ulf Kirsten	25
1995–96	Bundesliga (1)	34	8	14	12	37	38	38	14th	SF				Rudi Völler	13
1996–97	Bundesliga (1)	34	21	6	7	69	41	69	2nd	R64				Ulf Kirsten ♦	22
1997–98	Bundesliga (1)	34	14	13	7	66	39	55	3rd	QF		UCL	QF	Ulf Kirsten ♦	27
1998–99	Bundesliga (1)	34	17	12	5	61	30	63	2nd	R32		UC	R32	Ulf Kirsten	24
1999–2000	Bundesliga (1)	34	21	10	3	74	36	73	2nd	R32		UCL UC	GS1 R32	Ulf Kirsten	23
2000–01	Bundesliga (1)	34	17	6	11	54	40	57	4th	R16		UCL UC	GS1 R32	Ulf Kirsten	17
2001–02	Bundesliga (1)	34	21	6	7	77	38	69	2nd	RU		UCL	RU	Michael Ballack	23
2002–03	Bundesliga (1)	34	11	7	16	47	56	40	15th	SF		UCL	GS2	Daniel Bierofka	9
2003–04	Bundesliga (1)	34	19	8	7	73	39	65	3rd	R16				Dimitar Berbatov	19
2004–05	Bundesliga (1)	34	16	9	9	65	44	57	6th	R32		UCL	R16	Dimitar Berbatov	26
2005–06	Bundesliga (1)	34	14	10	10	64	49	52	5th	R16		UC	1R	Dimitar Berbatov	24
2006–07	Bundesliga (1)	34	15	6	13	54	49	51	5th	R32		UC	QF	Andriy Voronin	12
2007–08	Bundesliga (1)	34	15	6	13	57	40	51	7th	R64		UC	QF	Stefan Kießling	16
2008–09	Bundesliga (1)	34	14	7	13	59	46	49	9th	RU				Patrick Helmes	24
2009–10	Bundesliga (1)	34	15	14	5	65	38	59	4th	R32				Stefan Kießling	21
2010–11	Bundesliga (1)	34	20	8	6	64	44	68	2nd	R32		UEL	R16	Arturo Vidal	14
2011–12	Bundesliga (1)	34	15	9	10	52	44	54	5th	R64		UCL	R16	Stefan Kießling	17
2012–13	Bundesliga (1)	34	19	8	7	65	39	65	3rd	R16		UEL	R32	Stefan Kießling ♦	27
2013–14	Bundesliga (1)	34	19	4	11	60	41	61	4th	QF		UCL	R16	Stefan Kießling	14
2014–15	Bundesliga (1)	34	17	10	7	62	37	61	4th	QF		UCL	R16	Stefan Kießling	18
2015–16	Bundesliga (1)	34	18	6	10	56	40	60	3rd	QF		UCL UEL	GS R16	Javier Hernández	26
2016–17	Bundesliga (1)	34	11	8	15	53	55	41	12th	R32		UCL	R16	Javier Hernández	13
2017–18	Bundesliga (1)	34	15	10	9	58	44	55	5th	SF				Kevin Volland	14
2018–19	Bundesliga (1)	34	18	4	12	69	52	58	4th	R16		UEL	R32	Kai Havertz	19
2019–20	Bundesliga (1)	34	19	6	9	61	44	63	5th	RU		UCL UEL	GS QF	Kai Havertz	18
2020–21	Bundesliga (1)	34	14	10	10	53	39	52	6th	R16		UEL	R32	Lucas Alario Leon Bailey	15
2021–22	Bundesliga (1)	34	19	7	8	80	47	64	3rd	R32		UEL	R16	Patrik Schick	24
2022–23	Bundesliga (1)	34	14	8	12	57	49	50	6th	R1		UCL UEL	GS SF	Moussa Diaby	14
2023–24	Bundesliga (1)	34	28	6	0	89	24	90	1st	W		UEL	RU	Victor Boniface	21
2024–25	Bundesliga (1)	34	19	12	3	72	43	69	2nd	SF	W	UCL	R16	Patrik Schick	27
2025–26	Bundesliga (1)	34	17	8	9	68	47	59	6th	SF		UCL	R16	Patrik Schick	22
