= Patrik Schick =

Czech footballer (born 1996)

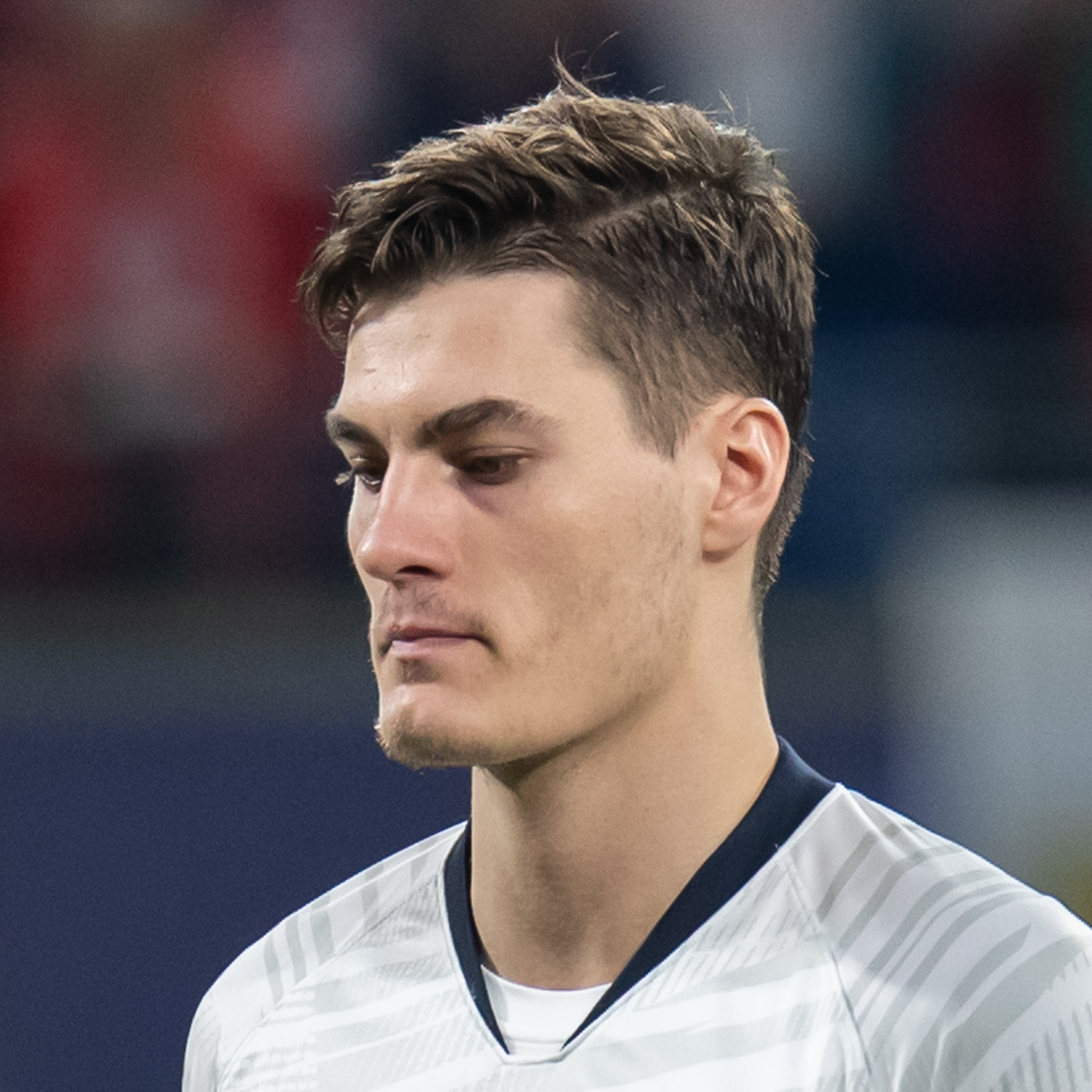
- Schick with RB Leipzig in 2020

Personal information
- Full name: Patrik Schick
- Date of birth: 24 January 1996 (age 30)
- Place of birth: Prague, Czech Republic
- Height: 1.91 m (6 ft 3 in)
- Position: Striker

Team information
- Current team: Bayer Leverkusen
- Number: 14

Youth career
- 2007–2014: Sparta Prague

Senior career*
Years	Team	Apps	(Gls)
2014–2016	Sparta Prague	4	(0)
2015–2016	→ Bohemians 1905 (loan)	27	(8)
2016–2017	Sampdoria	32	(11)
2017–2020	Roma	46	(5)
2019–2020	→ RB Leipzig (loan)	22	(10)
2020–	Bayer Leverkusen	158	(88)

International career
2011	Czech Republic U16	2	(0)
2012–2013	Czech Republic U17	11	(7)
2013–2014	Czech Republic U18	9	(2)
2014–2015	Czech Republic U19	13	(7)
2015–2017	Czech Republic U21	12	(11)
2016–2026	Czech Republic	56	(26)
- * Club domestic league appearances and goals as of 23:11, 8 November 2026 (UTC)

Patrik Schick (born 24 January 1996) is a Czech professional footballer who plays as a striker for Bundesliga club Bayer Leverkusen.

Born in Prague, Schick began his career with local club Sparta Prague, rising through their youth ranks, before making his senior debut as a teenager. He spent the 2015–16 season on loan with Bohemians 1905, from where he moved at the age of 20 to Sampdoria in Italy. After his debut season in Italy, he moved to Roma in 2017. Having spent three years in Italy, Schick moved to Germany in 2019 to join RB Leipzig on a season-long loan before moving to Bayer Leverkusen on a permanent basis in September 2020. There he won a domestic double of the Bundesliga and the DFB-Pokal in 2024.

Formerly an international at under-16, under-17, under-18, under-19, and under-21 levels, Schick made his senior debut for the Czech Republic in May 2016 at the age of 20. He has since helped the national team reach the quarter-finals of the European Championship in 2020, where he won both the Goal of the Tournament and the Silver Boot awards as the joint-highest goalscorer of the tournament.

== Club career ==
=== Sparta Prague ===
Schick was born in Prague and spotted by Sparta Prague when he was 11 years old. He made his top-flight debut for Sparta on 3 May 2014 in a 3–1 away loss at Teplice. Sparta would win the domestic double that campaign but four appearances over two campaigns meant Schick crossed town to join Bohemians 1905 on loan for the 2015–16 season. He scored 8 goals in 27 outings for Bohemians during a relegation battle. Schick returned to Sparta and was expected to feature prominently for the club during the 2016–17 season, but David Lafata was preferred and when Sparta offered Schick a new contract, his agent turned it down.

=== Sampdoria ===
Schick signed for Serie A club Sampdoria in June 2016 for a reported fee of €4 million. In his first season in Italy, he appeared in 32 league matches and scored 11 goals for Sampdoria. He started 14 times and was able to score once every 137 minutes.

In May 2017, Schick refused to extend his contract, expecting a transfer to another club. In June 2017, Juventus triggered the release clause of a reported €30 million on Schick's contract. Schick failed two separate medicals and Juventus backed out of the deal on 18 July.

=== Roma ===
On 29 August 2017, Schick joined Roma on loan for a fee of €5 million with an option to buy for a further €9 million, once certain sporting objectives had been achieved, that could be rising up to a club record €40 million fee, which turn out to be unavailable. Upon signing, Roma sporting director Monchi described Schick as "one of the brightest prospects in international football." Schick spent most of his spell at Roma playing out on the right wing or left up front by himself, and he scored only eight times in 58 games.

==== 2019–20: Loan to RB Leipzig ====
On 2 September 2019, Bundesliga club RB Leipzig announced the signing of Schick on a season-long loan deal with an option to buy him permanently. His first goal for Leipzig came in a 3–2 defeat of SC Paderborn on 11 November 2019. This started a run of three goals in four league appearances including coming off the bench to complete the comeback and secure a 3–3 draw with Borussia Dortmund. Alongside Timo Werner, Schick rekindled his form with 10 goals in 28 games for Leipzig as the club finished in third place in the Bundesliga and reached the semi-finals of the Champions League.

=== Bayer Leverkusen ===
==== 2020–21: Debut season ====
On 8 September 2020, Schick joined Bayer Leverkusen on a five-year contract for a reported fee of €26.5 million plus bonuses, getting the number 14 on his jersey.

Schick scored his first goal in a UEFA competition on 26 November 2020, coming in a 4–1 victory over Israeli club Hapoel Be'er Sheva in the group stage of the Europa League. On 19 December 2020, Schick scored a volley against Bayern Munich in a 2–1 loss for Leverkusen. He was the preferred centre-forward for much of the 2020–21 campaign at the BayArena and finished with nine strikes across 29 league games.

==== 2021–22: Record breaking season ====
On 4 October 2021, Schick scored his first brace for Leverkusen and provided an assist against Arminia Bielefeld which ended a 4–0 win. Schick continued his goalscoring threat scoring once in the next two league games against 1. FC Köln and Bayern Munich before he tore his ankle ligament. On 4 December 2021, Schick scored four goals and provided an assist – all in the second half – in a 7–1 victory against Greuther Fürth, which is the most goals in a single game from an individual in Leverkusen's history. He continued his good form in Leverkusen's next two league games, scoring a brace in each match against Eintracht Frankfurt (not only a brace but also the 5000th penalty scored in the Bundesliga's history), and TSG Hoffenheim respectively. Because of this, Schick won Bundesliga Player of the month by scoring eight goals and one assist in the four matches he played. In the first half of the season, Schick scored 16 goals in 14 games, while also missing a few games due to injury, and was only behind Robert Lewandowski in the top goalscoring charts.

Following the mid-season winter break, Schick scored four times in six league matches. In the sixth game against Mainz 05 he scored from a long range shot outside the box, but in the 49th minute of the same game, he tore his muscle fibre in the calf region, causing him to miss the following six games. He scored four goals and provided two assists in the last four matchdays of the 2021–22 season, most notably a double against Hoffenheim, which secured his club's place for Champions League for the following season, and just missing out on the goalscoring record held by Stefan Kießling by a single goal. He ended the season as the league's second highest scorer with 24 goals in 27 matches, while winning Leverkusen's player of the season award, then extended his contract with the club until 2027.

==== 2022–23: Injury crisis ====
On 3 September 2022, Schick scored his first goal of the season against Freiburg. On 7 September, in the 2022-23 UEFA Champions League match against Club Brugge, Schick scored a header which was controversially ruled out from VAR, ten minutes after Schick scored a bicycle kick which was ruled out for offside. Schick made it back to back games scoring and this time was against Hertha BSC. Schick received an adductor injury. On 19 February 2023 he scored immediately off the bench after being out for several weeks against Mainz. He again was involved in a goal and provided an assist in a 4–1 victory against Hertha Berlin. Schick got an adductor injury again, which meant he would miss the rest of the season and the first half of the next season, overall missing 34 matches due to injury in this season.

==== 2023–24: Comeback and historic success ====
On 30 November 2023, Schick returned from a long-time injury with a goal in a 2–0 away victory against BK Häcken in the 2023–24 Europa League, then went on to score five more goals and provide one assist in six more matches in all competitions. On 3 December, he came on as a substitute in the 79th minute and went on to assist a vital goal in the same minute to Victor Boniface against Borussia Dortmund to extend Leverkusen's unbeaten streak. On 20 December, he scored a first-half hat-trick against VfL Bochum, with the game finishing in a 4–0 victory.

In March 2024, Schick scored three critical goals to keep Bayer Leverkusen in the Europa League in their round of 16 tie against Qarabağ FK. During the first leg in Baku, he scored the equalizing stoppage-time goal for Leverkusen, ending in a 2–2 draw. In the following leg, he scored two stoppage-time goals to end the game in a 3–2 victory. On 30 March, he scored a stoppage-time winner in a 2–1 victory over Hoffenheim, which secured his club's qualification for the UEFA Champions League league phase. On 5 May, against Eintracht Frankfurt, Schick scored a header in a 5–1 victory for Leverkusen to extend their 48-game unbeaten streak. On 12 May, against VfL Bochum, Schick scored the opening goal of a 5–0 Leverkusen win, making history as the club's 50th game unbeaten. On 18 May 2024, in the final day of the season Schick was a part of the first ever unbeaten Bundesliga season with Bayer Leverkusen. In the DFB-Pokal final Schick helped his team win 1–0 against Kaiserslautern, to make it a special double trophy winning season, then he prepared for the upcoming Euro 2024 tournament.

==== 2024–25: Defending champions ====
In the 2024 DFL-Supercup at the start of the season against VfB Stuttgart, Schick scored an equaliser in the 88th minute to make the score 2–2 and bring on a penalty shoot-out, during which he scored and Leverkusen won 4–3 to win their first ever Supercup. On 23 November, Schick scored a hat-trick against Heidenheim in a 5–2 comeback victory. Three days later, he netted his first UEFA Champions League goal in a 5–0 victory over Red Bull Salzburg. On Schick's 100th league appearance in a match against Union Berlin on 30 November, Schick scored in a 2–1 victory. On 21 December, Schick scored four goals in a 5–1 win over Freiburg, surpassing Jan Koller's 61 goal record for Czech players in the league. On 5 February 2025, he netted a brace, including a stoppage-time equalizer, against 1. FC Köln in the DFB-Pokal quarter-final, which ended in a 3–2 victory after extra time. Schick ended the 2024–25 season as top goal scorer for Leverkusen across all competitions with 27 goals and behind only Harry Kane as the top-scorer in the league.

==== 2025–26 ====
On 4 August 2025, Schick extended his contract with Leverkusen until 2030. On 15 August, in a DFB-Pokal match against Großaspach, Schick scored Leverkusen's first goal under Erik ten Hag. On 30 August, Schick scored a brace in a 3–3 draw against Werder Bremen which concluded Ten Hag's era at Leverkusen. Schick continued his good form and scored a penalty against Eintracht Frankfurt in Kasper Hjulmand's first game to earn Leverkusen their first Bundesliga win of the season. On 14 March 2026, he featured in his 200th match for Leverkusen in a 1–1 draw with Bayern Munich. On 25 April, he scored his 100th goal for Leverkusen in all competitions, in a 2–1 victory over Cologne, in the Rheinisches Derby.

== International career ==
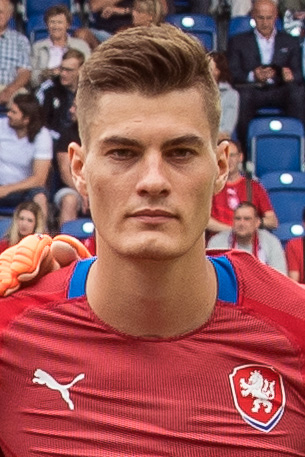
Schick with the Czech Republic in 2018

Schick was called up to the Czech Republic senior side for the first time at their pre-UEFA Euro 2016 training camp. He made his national team debut in a friendly match against Malta on 27 May 2016, scoring after coming on as a second-half substitute in a 6–0 victory.

=== UEFA Euro 2020 ===
On 25 May 2021, Schick was included in the Czech Republic's final 26-man squad for the postponed UEFA Euro 2020 tournament. In the first group stage match against Scotland on 14 June at Hampden Park in Glasgow, Schick scored both goals as the Czech Republic won 2–0. The second strike from the halfway line was the longest-recorded goal at the Euros since 1980 at 45 metres (49 yd). The goal was later voted as the "goal of the tournament", and was nominated for the FIFA Puskás Award. He became the first Czech footballer since Tomáš Rosický at the 2006 FIFA World Cup to score a brace at a major tournament and Milan Baroš in 2004 to do so at the European Championship.

Against Croatia on 18 June, Schick scored from a penalty to help his nation earn a 1–1 draw. On 27 June, he scored his fourth goal of the tournament in the Czech Republic's victory over the Netherlands in the round of 16. On 3 July, he scored in a 2–1 controversial defeat against Denmark in the quarter-finals to equal Milan Baroš' record of five goals for the Czech Republic in a European Championship tournament. Alongside Cristiano Ronaldo, he was the UEFA Euro 2020 joint top scorer with five goals, with the higher number of goals scored from open play.

=== 2022 FIFA World Cup qualifying ===
In the 2022 World Cup Qualifiers against Belarus, Schick scored and provided Hlozek's first goal for the national team, and it ended a comfortable 2–0 win. He was injured for the remaining fixtures and the Czechs failed to qualify. On 27 September 2022, in a match against Switzerland in the Nations League, Schick scored a goal after being injured for many months and sidelined away from the national team for almost one year, but the Czechs lost 2–1.

=== UEFA Euro 2024 ===
On 29 May 2024, Schick was included in the final Czech squad for the UEFA Euro 2024. On 10 June, the nation's final pre-tournament match against North Macedonia, Schick had a goal ruled offside, but went on to score from the penalty spot in a 2–1 victory for the Czechs. In the tournament, he scored the equaliser against Georgia in a 1–1 group stage draw, which was also his 20th goal for the national team, only to suffer from a calf injury ten minutes later.

=== 2026 FIFA World Cup qualifying ===
On 22 March 2025, Schick scored both of his nation's goals against Faroe Islands in a 2–1 victory to start the Czech Republic's campaign. On 25 March, he scored once against Gibraltar in a 4–0 victory. By doing so, he became the top scorer at that point in the 2026 FIFA World Cup qualification with three goals. The Czech Republic eventually finished second in Group L behind Croatia, qualifying for the play-offs.

=== 2026 FIFA World Cup and retirement ===
On 31 May 2026, Schick was selected in the 26-man squad for the 2026 FIFA World Cup. He announced his retirement from international football after the Czechs were eliminated in the group stage, ending his decade-long career with the national team.

== Style of play ==
Although Schick mostly plays in a central role as a main striker, he is also capable of playing as a second striker or as a right winger. He can hold up the ball with his back to goal, but is also an agile player, who possesses technique and dribbling skills, which enables him to play the ball first time, participate in the build-up of attacking plays and provide assists. Schick is also known for his signature celebration: every time he scores a goal, he flexes his muscles in front of the fans.

== Personal life ==
Schick has an older sister, Kristýna Schicková (born 31 July 1994), who is a model and a social media influencer. In his teenage years, Schick considered a career as a model but focused on competitive football instead. Growing up, his footballing hero was Manchester United player Wayne Rooney.

In July 2020, Schick married his long-time girlfriend Hana Běhounková (born 1996). They have two children named Victoria and Nico, born in October 2020 and 2021 respectively.

== Career statistics ==
=== Club ===
As of match played 8 November 2026

Appearances and goals by club, season and competition
Club	Season	League			National cup (Note: Includes Czech Cup, Coppa Italia, DFB-Pokal)		Europe		Other		Total	
Club	Season	Division	Apps	Goals	Apps	Goals	Apps	Goals	Apps	Goals	Apps	Goals
Sparta Prague	2013–14	Czech First League	2	0	1	0	0	0	—		3	0
Sparta Prague	2014–15	Czech First League	2	0	3	1	2 (Note: Appearances in UEFA Europa League)	0	—		7	1
Sparta Prague	Total		4	0	4	1	2	0	—		10	1
Bohemians 1905 (loan)	2015–16	Czech First League	27	8	1	0	—		—		28	8
Sampdoria	2016–17	Serie A	32	11	3	2	—		—		35	13
Roma	2017–18	Serie A	22	2	1	1	3 (Note: Appearances in UEFA Champions League)	0	—		26	3
Roma	2018–19	Serie A	24	3	2	2	6	0	—		32	5
Roma	Total		46	5	3	3	9	0	—		58	8
RB Leipzig (loan)	2019–20	Bundesliga	22	10	1	0	5	0	—		28	10
Bayer Leverkusen	2020–21	Bundesliga	29	9	2	1	5	3	—		36	13
Bayer Leverkusen	2021–22	Bundesliga	27	24	1	0	3	0	—		31	24
Bayer Leverkusen	2022–23	Bundesliga	14	3	1	1	8 (Note: Five appearances in UEFA Champions League, three appearances in UEFA Europa League)	0	—		23	4
Bayer Leverkusen	2023–24	Bundesliga	20	7	4	1	9	5	—		33	13
Bayer Leverkusen	2024–25	Bundesliga	31	21	5	4	8	1	1 (Note: Appearance in DFL-Supercup)	1	45	27
Bayer Leverkusen	2025–26	Bundesliga	28	16	5	2	9	4	—		42	22
Bayer Leverkusen	2026–27	Bundesliga	9	8	2	2	4	2	—		15	12
Bayer Leverkusen	Total		158	88	20	11	46	15	1	1	225	115
Career total			289	122	32	18	63	15	1	1	384	156

=== International ===
Appearances and goals by national team and year
National team	Year	Apps	Goals
Czech Republic	2016	3	1
Czech Republic	2017	2	0
Czech Republic	2018	9	4
Czech Republic	2019	8	4
Czech Republic	2020	0	0
Czech Republic	2021	11	8
Czech Republic	2022	2	1
Czech Republic	2023	0	0
Czech Republic	2024	7	2
Czech Republic	2025	8	4
Czech Republic	2026	6	2
Total		56	26

Scores and results list Czech Republic's goal tally first, score column indicates score after each Schick goal.

List of international goals scored by Patrik Schick
No.	Date	Venue	Cap	Opponent	Score	Result	Competition
1	27 May 2016	Kufstein Arena, Kufstein, Austria	1	Malta	6–0	6–0	Friendly
2	26 March 2018	Guangxi Sports Center, Nanning, China	7	China	2–1	4–1	2018 China Cup
3	6 September 2018	Městský fotbalový stadion, Uherské Hradiště, Czech Republic	10	Ukraine	1–0	1–2	2018–19 UEFA Nations League B
4	13 October 2018	Štadión Antona Malatinského, Trnava, Slovakia	11	Slovakia	2–1	2–1	2018–19 UEFA Nations League B
5	19 November 2018	Sinobo Stadium, Prague, Czech Republic	14	Slovakia	1–0	1–0	2018–19 UEFA Nations League B
6	7 June 2019	Stadion Letná, Prague, Czech Republic	17	Bulgaria	1–1	2–1	UEFA Euro 2020 qualifying
7	7 June 2019	Stadion Letná, Prague, Czech Republic	17	Bulgaria	2–1	2–1	UEFA Euro 2020 qualifying
8	10 June 2019	Andrův stadion, Olomouc, Czech Republic	18	Montenegro	3–0	3–0	UEFA Euro 2020 qualifying
9	7 September 2019	Fadil Vokrri Stadium, Pristina, Kosovo	19	Kosovo	1–0	1–2	UEFA Euro 2020 qualifying
10	24 March 2021	Arena Lublin, Lublin, Poland	23	Estonia	1–1	6–2	2022 FIFA World Cup qualification
11	8 June 2021	Stadion Letná, Prague, Czech Republic	26	Albania	1–0	3–1	Friendly
12	14 June 2021	Hampden Park, Glasgow, Scotland	27	Scotland	1–0	2–0	UEFA Euro 2020
13	14 June 2021	Hampden Park, Glasgow, Scotland	27	Scotland	2–0	2–0	UEFA Euro 2020
14	18 June 2021	Hampden Park, Glasgow, Scotland	28	Croatia	1–0	1–1	UEFA Euro 2020
15	27 June 2021	Puskás Aréna, Budapest, Hungary	30	Netherlands	2–0	2–0	UEFA Euro 2020
16	3 July 2021	Olympic Stadium, Baku, Azerbaijan	31	Denmark	1–2	1–2	UEFA Euro 2020
17	11 October 2021	Central Stadium, Kazan, Russia	33	Belarus	1–0	2–0	2022 FIFA World Cup qualification
18	27 September 2022	Kybunpark, St. Gallen, Switzerland	35	Switzerland	1–2	1–2	2022–23 UEFA Nations League A
19	10 June 2024	Malšovická aréna, Hradec Králové, Czech Republic	38	North Macedonia	1–0	2–1	Friendly
20	22 June 2024	Volksparkstadion, Hamburg, Germany	40	Georgia	1–1	1–1	UEFA Euro 2024
21	22 March 2025	Malšovická aréna, Hradec Králové, Czech Republic	43	Faroe Islands	1–0	2–1	2026 FIFA World Cup qualification
22	22 March 2025	Malšovická aréna, Hradec Králové, Czech Republic	43	Faroe Islands	2–1	2–1	2026 FIFA World Cup qualification
23	25 March 2025	Estádio Algarve, Faro/Loulé, Portugal	44	Gibraltar	2–0	4–0	2026 FIFA World Cup qualification
24	6 June 2025	Doosan Arena, Plzeň, Czech Republic	45	Montenegro	2–0	2–0	2026 FIFA World Cup qualification
25	26 March 2026	Fortuna Arena, Prague, Czech Republic	51	Republic of Ireland	1–2	2–2 (a.e.t.) (4–3 p)	2026 FIFA World Cup qualification
26	4 June 2026	Sports Illustrated Stadium, Harrison, United States	53	Guatemala	1–0	3–1	Friendly

== Honours ==
Sparta Prague

- Czech First League: 2013–14
- Czech Cup: 2013–14
- Czech Supercup: 2014

Bayer Leverkusen

- Bundesliga: 2023–24
- DFB-Pokal: 2023–24
- DFL-Supercup: 2024

Individual

- Czech Footballer of the Year: 2021, 2022
- Czech Golden Ball: 2022, 2026
- Czech Talent of the Year: 2016
- UEFA European Championship Silver Boot: 2020
- UEFA European Championship Goal of the Tournament: 2020
- Bundesliga Player of the Month: December 2021
- kicker Bundesliga Team of the Season: 2021–22
