= Germany national under-16 football team =

National U-16 association football team

- Nickname: Manashaft
- Association: German Football Association
- Confederation: UEFA
- Head coach: Michael Prus
- Home stadium: Variable

Germany national under-16 football team is the official representative of Germany in European competitions in its category and is managed by the German football Association.

It plays European championship in his class and friendly matches and played games until 2014.

== Players ==
=== Current squad ===
The following players were named in the squad for the friendly matches against Italy on 27 and 30 March 2026.

Caps and goals correct as of 30 March 2026, after the match against Italy.

| No. | Pos. | Player | Date of birth (age) | Caps | Goals | Club |
|---|---|---|---|---|---|---|
| | GK | David Podar-Știube | 31 May 2010 (age 16) | 5 | 0 | (German Football Association) Bayern Munich |
| 12 | GK | Jacob Esser | 14 February 2010 (age 16) | 4 | 0 | (German Football Association) 1. FC Köln |
| 1 | GK | Nick Hartung | 19 April 2010 (age 16) | 2 | 0 | (German Football Association) Mainz 05 |
| 4 | DF | Filip Pavić (captain) | 19 January 2010 (age 16) | 11 | 0 | (German Football Association) Bayern Munich |
| | DF | Jonas Berkhoff | 19 June 2010 (age 16) | 11 | 0 | (German Football Association) Mainz 05 |
| 22 | DF | Benjamin Freiberger | 12 April 2010 (age 16) | 11 | 0 | (German Football Association) Eintracht Frankfurt |
| 15 | DF | Mikael Baza | 12 January 2010 (age 16) | 10 | 0 | (German Football Association) Hamburger SV |
| 3 | DF | Vincent Clair | 4 May 2010 (age 16) | 10 | 2 | (German Football Association) RB Leipzig |
| | DF | Noel Motta | 1 May 2010 (age 16) | 6 | 1 | (German Football Association) Eintracht Frankfurt |
| 5 | DF | Max Gordon | 16 January 2010 (age 16) | 6 | 0 | (German Football Association) Bayer Leverkusen |
| | DF | Jona Strub | 27 February 2010 (age 16) | 6 | 0 | (German Football Association) Mainz 05 |
| | DF | Ben Nwachukwu | 25 April 2010 (age 16) | 5 | 0 | (German Football Association) 1. FC Köln |
| | DF | Tom Hagmeister | 5 July 2010 (age 16) | 4 | 0 | (German Football Association) VfB Stuttgart |
| | DF | Finn Schröder | 2 January 2010 (age 16) | 3 | 0 | (German Football Association) Eintracht Frankfurt |
| 2 | DF | Timo Dachgruber | 4 January 2010 (age 16) | 1 | 0 | (German Football Association) Bayern Munich |
| | DF | Nino Debitsch | 18 February 2010 (age 16) | 0 | 0 | (German Football Association) 1. FC Magdeburg |
| 14 | DF | Nwabueze Ehiwario | 6 July 2010 (age 16) | 0 | 0 | (German Football Association) RB Leipzig |
| | DF | Ben Exner | 30 June 2010 (age 16) | 0 | 0 | (German Football Association) FC Augsburg |
| 8 | MF | Gabriel Minutillo | 13 January 2010 (age 16) | 11 | 3 | (German Football Association) Bayer Leverkusen |
| 16 | MF | Konrad Alfes | 3 March 2010 (age 16) | 10 | 0 | (German Football Association) Schalke 04 |
| 10 | MF | Eymen Demir | 2 May 2010 (age 16) | 8 | 2 | (German Football Association) Hannover 96 |
| 20 | MF | Niko Iličević | 30 October 2010 (age 16) | 6 | 2 | (German Football Association) Eintracht Frankfurt |
| | MF | Marko Soldić | 6 January 2010 (age 16) | 6 | 2 | (German Football Association) 1. FC Nürnberg |
| | MF | Leonhard Richert | 7 April 2010 (age 16) | 5 | 0 | (German Football Association) Bayern Munich |
| | MF | Roko Ciglar | 25 February 2010 (age 16) | 4 | 0 | (German Football Association) Bayern Munich |
| | MF | Kurt Budzinski | 8 March 2010 (age 16) | 4 | 0 | (German Football Association) RB Leipzig |
| 6 | MF | Damian Galun | 4 March 2010 (age 16) | 1 | 0 | (German Football Association) FC Augsburg |
| | MF | Enrico Wiehle | 6 January 2010 (age 16) | 0 | 0 | (German Football Association) VfB Stuttgart |
| 19 | FW | Vedad Turbić | 12 August 2010 (age 16) | 10 | 8 | (German Football Association) Bayern Munich |
| 21 | FW | Linus Ludwig | 2 February 2010 (age 16) | 10 | 4 | (German Football Association) Bayern Munich |
| 7 | FW | Kevin Baldwin | 13 August 2010 (age 16) | 10 | 1 | (German Football Association) Mainz 05 |
| 17 | FW | William Recupero | 11 January 2010 (age 16) | 8 | 2 | (German Football Association) VfB Stuttgart |
| 9 | FW | Milo Barde | 25 April 2010 (age 16) | 7 | 3 | (German Football Association) Hannover 96 |
| 11 | FW | Samuel Passariello | 9 February 2010 (age 16) | 6 | 2 | (German Football Association) TSG Hoffenheim |
| | FW | Metehan Eksiner | 14 February 2010 (age 16) | 1 | 0 | (German Football Association) 1. FC Nürnberg |
| | FW | Daniel Abade | 14 January 2010 (age 16) | 0 | 0 | (German Football Association) Bayern Munich |
| | FW | Alexandro Hinz | 8 May 2010 (age 16) | 0 | 0 | (German Football Association) Werder Bremen |
| | FW | Skender Nuraj | 26 February 2010 (age 16) | 0 | 0 | (German Football Association) Bayern Munich |

== Notes ==
1-This article differs from the article on the Germany national youth football team, which is the U19 category, this is U16.
