= 2020–21 Chelsea F.C. season =

English football club season

Chelsea
2020–21 season
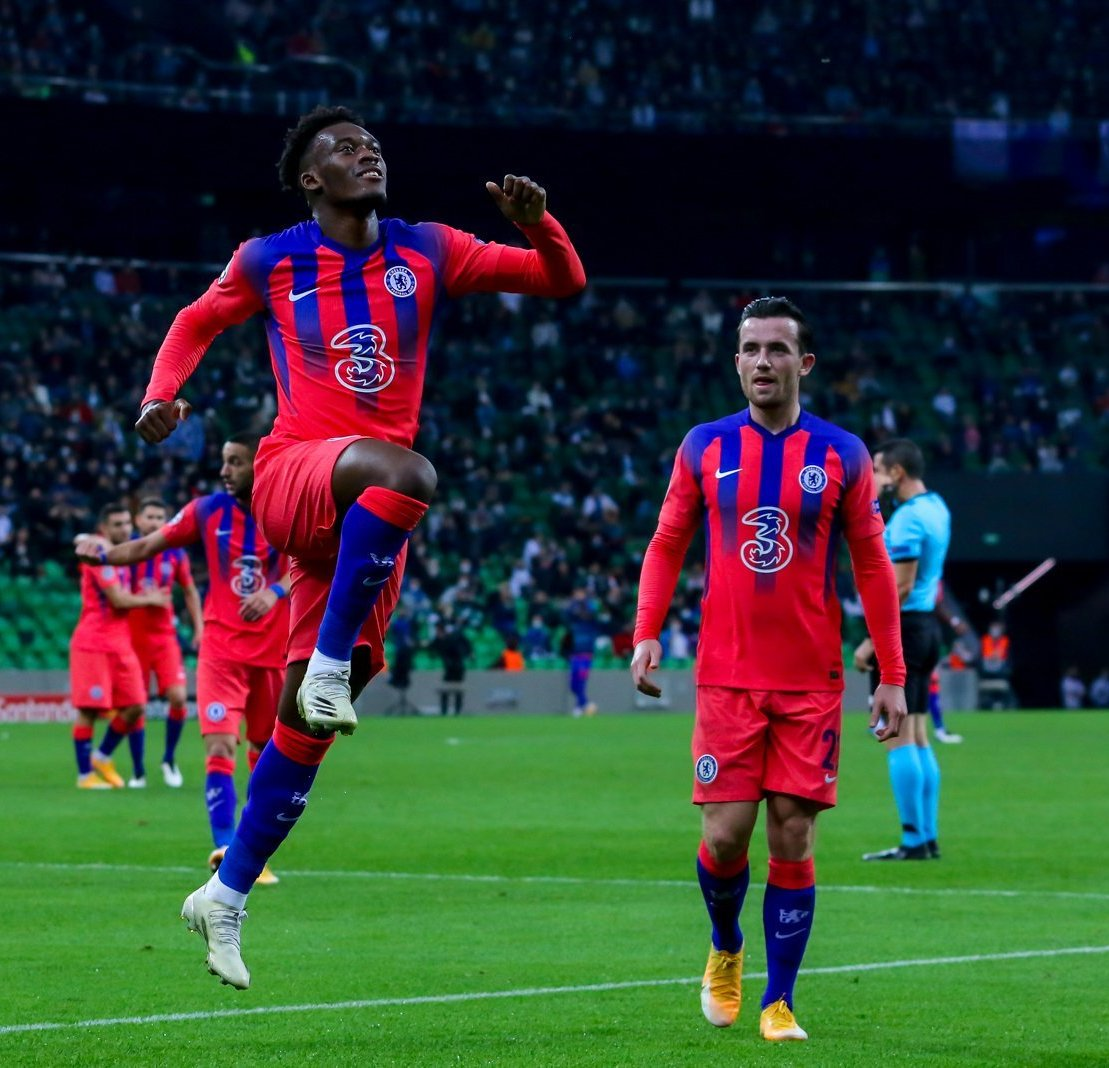
- Chelsea players celebrating a goal scored against FC Krasnodar at a UEFA Champions League match
- Owner: Roman Abramovich
- Chairman: Bruce Buck
- Head coach: Frank Lampard (until 25 January 2021); Thomas Tuchel (from 26 January 2021)
- Stadium: Stamford Bridge
- Premier League: 4th
- FA Cup: Runners-up
- EFL Cup: Fourth round
- UEFA Champions League: Winners
- Top goalscorer: League: Jorginho (7); All: Tammy Abraham; Timo Werner (12 each)
- Biggest win: 6–0 (vs. Barnsley, 23 September 2020, EFL Cup)
- Biggest defeat: 2–5 (vs. West Bromwich Albion, 3 April 2021, Premier League)
Home colours	Away colours	Third colours

The 2020–21 season was Chelsea's 107th competitive season, 32nd consecutive season in the top flight of English football, 29th consecutive season in the Premier League, and 115th year in existence as a football club. The season covered the period from 1 July 2020 to 30 June 2021.

Prior to the 2020–21 season, Chelsea made numerous high-profile signings in the transfer market, bringing in the likes of Timo Werner, Kai Havertz, Ben Chilwell, Hakim Ziyech, and Thiago Silva in the close-season, as well as Édouard Mendy shortly after the season began. The Blues began this season under the management of former Chelsea player Frank Lampard, in his second season at the club. However, Lampard was sacked in January and replaced by German manager Thomas Tuchel, who guided the club to European glory, as on 29 May, Chelsea defeated fellow English side Manchester City in the Champions League final, their second title in the competition, and their first since 2012.

The season was the first since 2012–13 without Willian, who departed to Arsenal.

== Kits ==
Home	Home alt.	Home 2021–22	Away	Away alt.	Third	Third alt.	Third alt. 2

Goalkeeper 1	Goalkeeper 2	Goalkeeper 3	Goalkeeper 2021–22

Starting with this season, Three UK replaced the Yokohama Rubber Company as Chelsea's shirt sponsor.

== Season overview ==
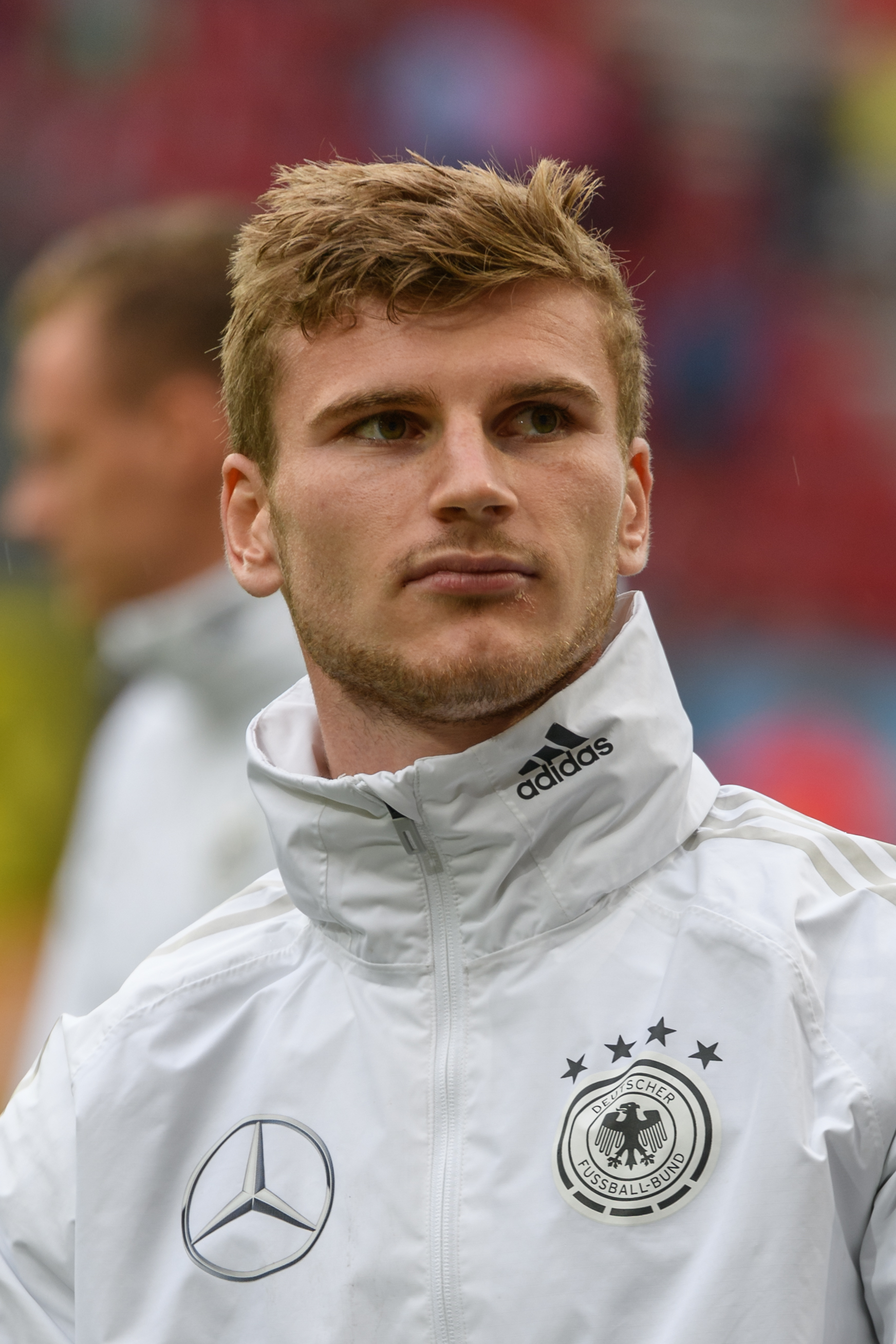
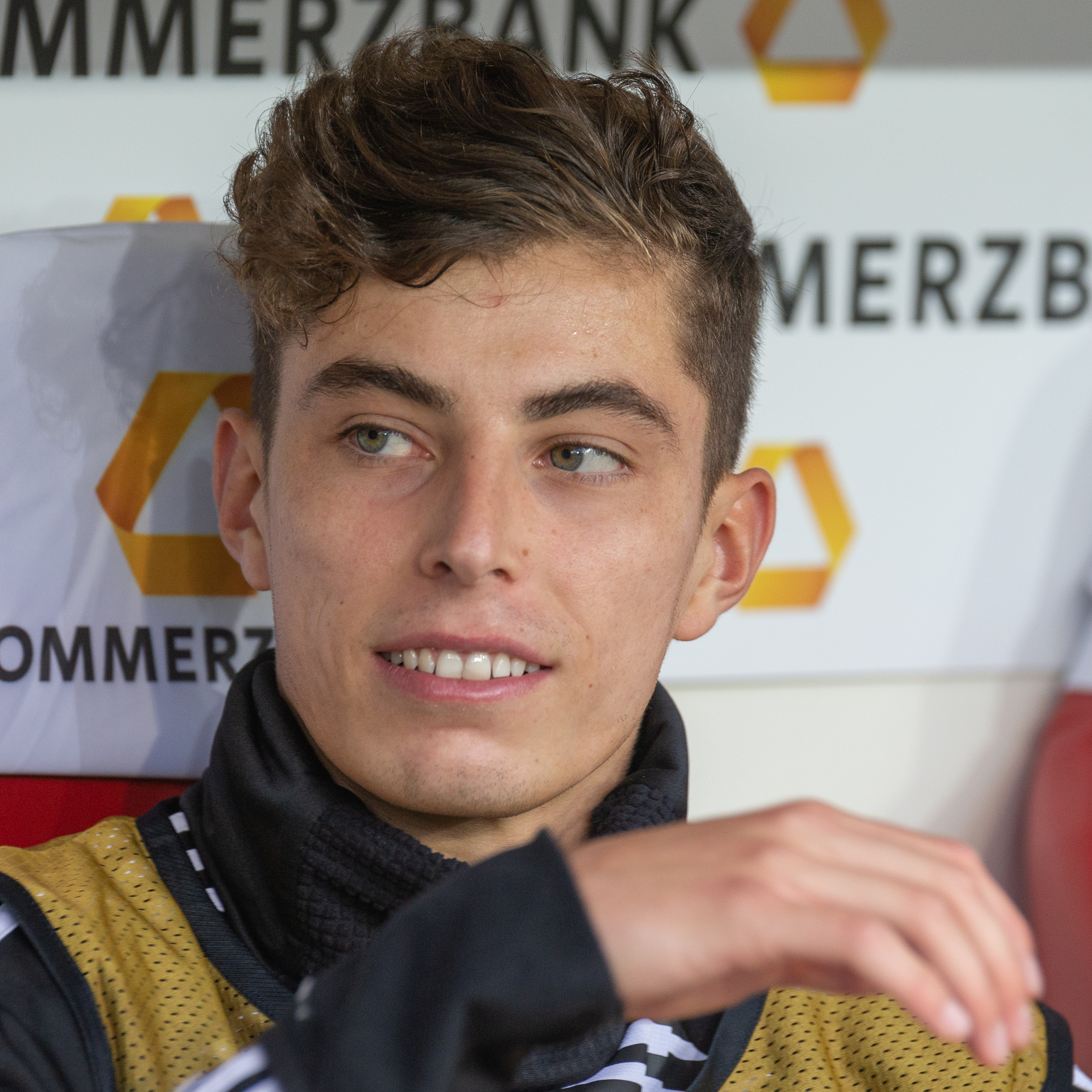
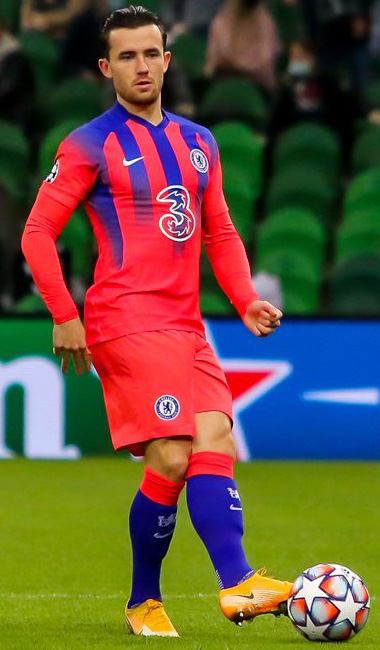
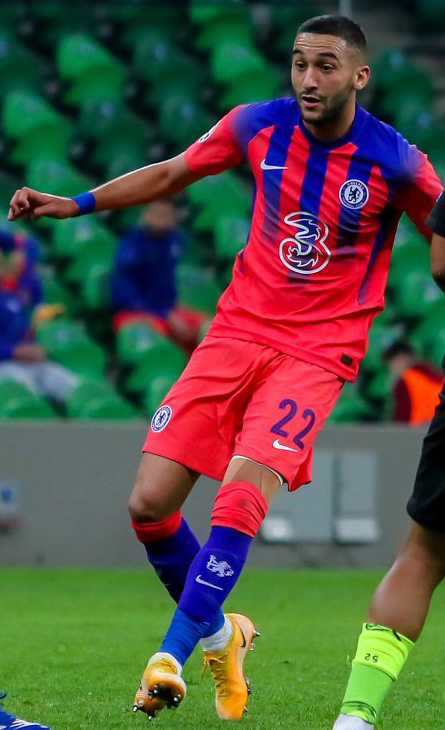
Timo Werner, Kai Havertz, Ben Chilwell and Hakim Ziyech were the fresh signings of this club. Frank Lampard bought them to Stamford Bridge prior to his sacking.

=== September ===
Chelsea played their first game of the new Premier League season on 14 September 2020, travelling to Brighton & Hove Albion and earning a 3–1 away victory, courtesy of goals from Jorginho, Kurt Zouma and Reece James. On 20 September, Chelsea welcomed defending champions Liverpool to Stamford Bridge. Andreas Christensen was dismissed in the first half after a naive challenge on Sadio Mané, who then proceeded to score two goals inside four minutes for Liverpool, with goalkeeper Kepa Arrizabalaga making a crucial mistake for Mané's second goal. New signing Timo Werner managed to win a penalty for Chelsea, but Jorginho had his effort saved by Alisson, his first penalty miss in nine attempts, as the match ended in a 2–0 defeat for Chelsea.

Three days later, Chelsea faced Barnsley in the EFL Cup, which ended in a 6–0 win for Chelsea, with Kai Havertz scoring a hat-trick for the Blues. Chelsea then travelled to The Hawthorns to play West Bromwich Albion. Chelsea were 3–0 down at half-time, but goals from Mason Mount, Callum Hudson-Odoi, and Tammy Abraham in stoppage-time managed to seal a draw as the match ended 3–3. On 29 September, Chelsea took on London rivals Tottenham Hotspur in the round of 16 in the EFL Cup. Timo Werner scored his first Chelsea goal to put the Blues ahead, but Erik Lamela managed to equalise in the second half. Chelsea would go on to lose 5–4 on penalties, with Mason Mount missing the decisive penalty and Chelsea finding themselves eliminated from the EFL Cup.

Reece James' goal against Brighton was nominated for the Premier League Goal of the Month award, but was won by Leicester City's James Maddison.

Position at the end of September
Pos	Team	Pld	W	D	L	GF	GA	GD	Pts
7	Leeds United	3	2	0	1	8	7	+1	6
8	Tottenham Hotspur	3	1	1	1	6	4	+2	4
9	Chelsea	3	1	1	1	6	6	0	4
10	Newcastle United	3	1	1	1	3	4	−1	4
11	West Ham United	3	1	0	2	5	4	+1	3

=== October ===
Chelsea's first match of October was against Crystal Palace at home. After no goals in the first half, Chelsea managed to win 4–0, as Ben Chilwell registered a goal and an assist on his Premier League debut for Chelsea. Two weeks later, on 17 October, Chelsea welcomed Southampton to Stamford Bridge. Timo Werner scored his first Premier League goals for Chelsea as the Blues were leading 2–0 inside 28 minutes, with Danny Ings managing to pull a goal back for the Saints before half-time. Che Adams scored an equaliser for Southampton 57 minutes in, but Chelsea instantly responded with a Kai Havertz goal two minutes later, his first in the Premier League. Chelsea were pegged back again in the 92nd minute, with Jannik Vestergaard levelling the game, as Chelsea managed to come out of the game with a frustrating 3–3 draw. In their next two games, Chelsea drew back-to-back games 0–0, first against Sevilla at home in their first Champions League group stage game of the season, and then again away at Manchester United in the Premier League.

Chelsea then defeated Krasnodar 4–0 away in the Champions League, with Callum Hudson-Odoi, Timo Werner, Hakim Ziyech, and Christian Pulisic all on target for the Blues. In Chelsea's final game of the month on 31 October, they defeated Burnley 3–0 away, with Hakim Ziyech scoring and assisting on his first Premier League start, with additional goals from Kurt Zouma and Timo Werner sealing the win for Chelsea.

As a result of his performances throughout the month, Thiago Silva was nominated for the Premier League Player of the Month award, which was eventually won by Tottenham Hotspur's Heung-min Son, and Timo Werner's first goal against Southampton was nominated for Premier League Goal of the Month, but was instead given to West Ham United's Manuel Lanzini.

Position at the end of October
Pos	Team	Pld	W	D	L	GF	GA	GD	Pts	Qualification
2	Everton	6	4	1	1	13	8	+5	13	Qualification for the Champions League group stage
3	Wolverhampton Wanderers	7	4	1	2	8	8	0	13	Qualification for the Champions League group stage
4	Chelsea	7	3	3	1	16	9	+7	12	Qualification for the Champions League group stage
5	Aston Villa	5	4	0	1	12	5	+7	12	Qualification for the Europa League group stage
6	Leicester City	6	4	0	2	13	8	+5	12	

=== November ===
Chelsea begun November with a 3–0 home victory over Rennes in the Champions League, with the goals coming from two Timo Werner penalties and a Tammy Abraham strike. Three days later, in Chelsea's last match before the November international break, Chelsea faced bottom of the league Sheffield United at home, who had lost seven out of their first eight Premier League games this season. The match ended in a comfortable 4–1 win for the Blues, which saw Hakim Ziyech pick up two assists.

After the international break, Chelsea returned on 21 November to face Newcastle United at St James' Park. Chelsea ran out 2–0 winners, with a Federico Fernández own goal and a goal from Tammy Abraham sealing the win for Chelsea, marking the first time Chelsea were top of the Premier League under Frank Lampard. Chelsea won their sixth consecutive game in a row in their next match against Rennes in the Champions League, which saw Callum Hudson-Odoi and Olivier Giroud on the scoresheet in a 2–1 away victory, sealing qualification for the Champions League round of 16. Chelsea next had inform London rivals Tottenham Hotspur to play at Stamford Bridge, who had already eliminated Chelsea from the EFL Cup back in September. The match ended in goalless 0–0 draw, which saw Tottenham ascend to the top of the league.

Ben Chilwell's performances throughout November earned a nomination for the Premier League Player of the Month award, which was by Manchester United's Bruno Fernandes, and Frank Lampard's managerial duties saw him nominated for Premier League Manager of the Month, which was instead by Tottenham Hotspur's José Mourinho.

Position at the end of November
Pos	Team	Pld	W	D	L	GF	GA	GD	Pts	Qualification
1	Tottenham Hotpsur	10	6	3	1	21	9	+12	21	Qualification for the Champions League group stage
2	Liverpool	10	6	3	1	17	12	+5	21	Qualification for the Champions League group stage
3	Chelsea	10	5	4	1	22	10	+12	19	Qualification for the Champions League group stage
4	Leicester City	10	6	0	4	19	14	+5	18	Qualification for the Champions League group stage
5	West Ham United	10	5	2	3	13	7	+6	17	Qualification for the Europa League group stage

=== December ===
Chelsea's first game of the busy December period was at Sevilla in the Champions League group stage. Frank Lampard's Blues ran out 4–0 winners, with Olivier Giroud scoring all four goals for Chelsea, ensuring that the Blues' top spot in their group was secured. On December 5, they welcomed bitter rivals Leeds United to Stamford Bridge, in Chelsea's first home game with 2,000 fans in attendance. Leeds took a shock lead just five minutes through Patrick Bamford, but the Blues managed to equalise with an Olivier Giroud goal and defeated their rivals 3–1 to go top of the Premier League, with Kurt Zouma and Christian Pulisic also adding to the goals. Chelsea played out a 1–1 home draw three days later against Krasnodar, in their final group stage game of the Champions League.

Next, Chelsea travelled to Goodison Park to play Everton on 12 December. The match ended in a 1–0 loss for Chelsea, their first away defeat of the season, putting an end to their 17-game unbeaten run and losing ground in the title race, with Tottenham and Liverpool both ahead of Chelsea, and with a game in hand. Chelsea then followed this up by losing again away to Wolverhampton Wanderers, with a 95th-minute winner from Pedro Neto sealing a 2–1 win for Wolves. Chelsea returned to winning ways in a 3–0 home victory against West Ham United, with a header from Thiago Silva and a brace from Tammy Abraham sealing an emphatic victory.

On 26 December, Chelsea travelled to North London to play out-of-form Arsenal at the Emirates Stadium; Arsenal were in 15th place and were winless in the last seven matches entering this game. The Gunners took a shock 2–0 lead at half-time, courtesy of an Alexandre Lacazette penalty and a Granit Xhaka free kick, before Bukayo Saka added to Arsenal's shock lead in the 56th minute. Tammy Abraham scored a consolation goal in the 85th minute, and Jorginho had a penalty saved in added time by Bernd Leno, to ensure no comeback was to happen for the Blues, in a humiliating 3–1 defeat. Chelsea closed out 2020 with a 1–1 home draw against Aston Villa, with Olivier Giroud and Anwar El Ghazi scoring the only goals of the game.

Position at the end of December
Pos	Team	Pld	W	D	L	GF	GA	GD	Pts	Qualification
4	Everton	15	9	2	4	25	18	+7	29	Qualification for the Champions League group stage
5	Aston Villa	14	8	2	4	28	14	+14	26	Qualification for the Europa League group stage
6	Chelsea	16	7	5	4	31	18	+13	26	
7	Tottenham Hotpsur	15	7	5	3	26	15	+11	26	
8	Manchester City	14	7	5	2	21	12	+9	26	

=== January ===
Chelsea's first match of 2021 was at home against Manchester City on 3 January. Chelsea struggled greatly throughout the game and were 3–0 down inside 34 minutes, with the goals coming from İlkay Gündoğan, Phil Foden, and former Chelsea man Kevin De Bruyne. Callum Hudson-Odoi scored a consolation goal in the 92nd minute, as the Blues suffered another embarrassing 3–1 defeat. The next week, Chelsea begun their quest for the FA Cup after coming up short the previous year, starting off their journey with a comfortable 4–0 home victory against League Two side Morecambe in the third round, with Mason Mount, Timo Werner, Callum Hudson-Odoi, and Kai Havertz finding the net for Chelsea.

Chelsea then made a trip to Craven Cottage to take on West London rivals Fulham. The game saw Fulham fullback Antonee Robinson being shown a red card after a dangerous challenge on César Azpilicueta. Mason Mount managed to score the only goal of the match in the 78th minute, as Chelsea earned a hard-fought 1–0 win against their rivals. Chelsea's next match was away at high-flying Leicester City, who at this point were second in the league. Chelsea went on to lose this match 2–0, with first-half goals from Wilfred Ndidi and James Maddison piling more misery on the Blues' bad run of form. Frank Lampard's final game took place on 24 January, as Chelsea defeated Luton Town 3–1 in the FA Cup. However, this wasn't enough to save Lampard's job, as the very next day, Chelsea announced the sacking of Lampard after their poor run of form that included only two wins from their past eight league matches.

The following day, it was announced that former Borussia Dortmund and Paris Saint-Germain manager Thomas Tuchel would be replacing Lampard as the manager of Chelsea. Tuchel's first match in charge took place two days later, with Chelsea taking on Wolverhampton Wanderers at Stamford Bridge. The match ended in a frustrating 0–0 stalemate, with Chelsea having 79% possession of the ball but were unable to find the net. Tuchel stated after the match that "we will build a team nobody wants to play against". Chelsea's final match of the month was against Burnley at home, which saw Tuchel claim his first win as Chelsea manager, as goals from César Azpilicueta and Marcos Alonso sealed a 2–0 victory for the Blues. Alonso's strike against the Clarets earned him a nomination for the Premier League Goal of the Month award, eventually won by Liverpool's Mohamed Salah.

Position at the end of January
Pos	Team	Pld	W	D	L	GF	GA	GD	Pts	Qualification
5	West Ham United	21	10	5	6	31	27	+4	35	Qualification for the Europa League group stage
6	Tottenham Hotpsur	20	9	6	5	34	21	+13	33	
7	Chelsea	21	9	6	6	35	23	+12	33	
8	Everton	19	10	3	6	28	23	+5	33	
9	Aston Villa	19	10	2	7	34	21	+13	32	

=== February ===
Chelsea opened February with three consecutive away victories at Tottenham Hotspur and Sheffield United in the league, and Barnsley in the FA Cup. On 15 February, Chelsea welcomed Newcastle United to Stamford Bridge, with Chelsea winning 2–0 to claim their fifth victory in a row in all competitions, as Timo Werner ended his 14-game goal drought in the Premier League, dating back to November.

Chelsea then took the trip to St Mary's Stadium to take on Southampton on 20 February, who had lost their last six Premier League matches in a row, including a 9–0 defeat at Manchester United. The Blues could only manage a 1–1 draw, with Takumi Minamino opening the scoring in the first half before Mason Mount equalised with a penalty in the second half. Three days later, Chelsea travelled to Spain to play Atlético Madrid in the first leg of their Champions League round of 16 tie. Chelsea won the match 1–0, with an Olivier Giroud bicycle kick sealing the first leg win and a crucial away goal for Chelsea. Chelsea returned to Premier League action on 28 February, playing out a dull goalless stalemate against Manchester United at Stamford Bridge.

Chelsea's league performances under Thomas Tuchel in February earned the German a nomination for the Premier League Manager of the Month award, which was won by Manchester City's Pep Guardiola.

Position at the end of February
Pos	Team	Pld	W	D	L	GF	GA	GD	Pts	Qualification
3	Leicester City	26	15	4	7	45	30	+15	49	Qualification for the Champions League group stage
4	West Ham United	26	13	6	7	40	31	+9	45	Qualification for the Champions League group stage
5	Chelsea	26	12	8	6	41	25	+16	44	Qualification for the Europa League group stage
6	Liverpool	26	12	7	7	42	29	+13	43	
7	Everton	24	12	4	8	36	32	+4	40	

=== March ===
Chelsea's first match of the month saw them take on Liverpool at Anfield, who had lost their last four home games after going on a 68-game home unbeaten run between April 2017 and January 2021, the second-longest in league history, with the record belonging to Chelsea themselves after going unbeaten at home for 86 games between March 2004 and October 2008. Chelsea defeated the Reds 1–0, with a superb Mason Mount strike in the 42nd minute condemning Liverpool to their fifth home loss in a row, and Tuchel extending his unbeaten run to 10 games. Next, Chelsea defeated Everton 2–0, with an own goal form Ben Godfrey and a Jorginho penalty sealing the victory for the Blues.

The Blues then travelled to Elland Road to play bitter rivals Leeds United on 13 March, which ended in a 0–0 draw. Chelsea then played the second leg of their Champions League round of 16 tie against Atlético Madrid, this time at home, with the Blues heading into the game with a 1–0 advantage and an away goal. Chelsea earned a 2–0 victory, with goals from Hakim Ziyech and Emerson Palmieri ensuring Chelsea's progression to the quarter finals of the Champions League, the first time they had done so since the 2013–14 season. The victory also meant that Tuchel became the first Chelsea manager to go unbeaten in his first 13 matches in charge of the club, surpassing the previous record of 12 held by Luiz Felipe Scolari. Chelsea followed this up by defeating Sheffield United in the quarter finals of the FA Cup, sending the Blues through to the semi-finals. Chelsea then went on a brief hiatus for the March international break.

Chelsea were nominated for all three Premier League awards in March, with Andreas Christensen's defensive performances earning him a nomination for the Premier League Player of the Month award, and Mason Mount's goal against Liverpool also being nominated for Premier League Goal of the Month. Thomas Tuchel was nominated for the Premier League Manager of the Month award for the second consecutive month, this time being honoured with the award.

Position at the end of March
Pos	Team	Pld	W	D	L	GF	GA	GD	Pts	Qualification
2	Manchester United	29	16	9	4	56	32	+24	57	Qualification for the Champions League group stage
3	Leicester City	29	17	5	7	53	32	+21	56	Qualification for the Champions League group stage
4	Chelsea	29	14	9	6	44	25	+19	51	Qualification for the Champions League group stage
5	West Ham United	29	14	7	8	45	35	+10	49	Qualification for the Europa League group stage
6	Tottenham Hotspur	29	14	6	9	49	30	+19	48	

=== April ===
Chelsea's first match after the international break saw them welcome relegation-fighting West Bromwich Albion to Stamford Bridge. Christian Pulisic gave Chelsea the lead 27 minutes in but just two minutes later, Thiago Silva was sent off after receiving a second yellow card. The Blues found themselves 2–1 down at half-time via a stoppage-time brace from Matheus Pereira. Goals from Callum Robinson and Mbaye Diagne gave the Baggies a shocking 4–1 lead. Mason Mount managed to pull one back for Chelsea, but another goal from Callum Robinson in added time capped off an embarrassing 2–5 defeat for Chelsea, ending Thomas Tuchel's 14-game unbeaten streak as manager. It was the first time Chelsea had conceded 5 goals at home since a 3–5 defeat against Arsenal in 2011, and was also the first time they had lost to West Bromwich Albion at Stamford Bridge since 1978. Chelsea bounced back from the humiliation in their next game, which was the first leg of their Champions League quarter final tie against Porto away, which saw a fine Mason Mount strike and a late Ben Chilwell goal give Chelsea a 2–0 victory with two crucial away goals.

Chelsea then travelled to South London to take on Crystal Palace away on 10 April. Goals from Kai Havertz, Kurt Zouma and a brace from Christian Pulisic saw Chelsea run out 4–1 winners, the first time they had scored more than two goals under Tuchel. The Blues then played Porto in the second leg of the Champions League quarter finals, heading into the game with a 2–0 advantage and two away goals. Chelsea were defeated 1–0 thanks to a late Mehdi Taremi overhead kick, but did enough to make it through to the Champions League semi-finals, winning 2–1 on aggregate. Four days later, Chelsea defeated Manchester City in the FA Cup semi-finals, with Hakim Ziyech scoring the winner to help Chelsea advance to the FA Cup Final for the second consecutive year.

On 18 April, it was announced that Chelsea would be a founding member of the newly formed European Super League, a proposed annual club football competition to be contested by twenty of Europe's most elite football clubs. On 20 April, after two days of widespread backlash from the United Kingdom government including Prime Minister Boris Johnson, FIFA, UEFA, the FA, other Premier League clubs, supporters, players, and broadcasters, and after Chairman Bruce Buck met with players, Chelsea announced their intention to withdraw from the competition. This led to the five other English clubs all pulling out later that night. By 21 April, the Super League announced it was suspending its operations.

On 20 April, Chelsea played out a 0–0 home draw against Brighton & Hove Albion, losing some ground in the top four race. Four days later, the Blues defeated West Ham United 1–0 away, with a Timo Werner goal sealing the win for Chelsea. Chelsea's final match of April was against Real Madrid away in the first leg of the Champions League semi-finals. Chelsea took the lead through Christian Pulisic, but Karim Benzema equalised for Real Madrid later in the first half, as the match ended in a 1–1 draw, with Chelsea entering the second leg at home a crucial away goal.

Position at the end of April
Pos	Team	Pld	W	D	L	GF	GA	GD	Pts	Qualification
2	Manchester United	33	19	10	4	64	35	+29	67	Qualification for the Champions League group stage
3	Leicester City	34	19	6	9	61	39	+22	63	Qualification for the Champions League group stage
4	Chelsea	33	16	10	7	51	31	+20	58	Qualification for the Champions League group stage
5	West Ham United	33	16	7	10	53	43	+10	55	Qualification for the Europa League group stage
6	Liverpool	33	15	9	9	50	34	+16	54	Qualification for the Europa Conference League play-off round

=== May ===
Chelsea's first fixture of May saw them defeat West London rivals Fulham 2–0, thanks to a brace from Kai Havertz. On 5 May, Chelsea welcomed Real Madrid to Stamford Bridge for the second leg of their semi-final, with the score being level at 1–1 and Chelsea heading into the match with an away goal. Timo Werner gave Chelsea the lead in the 28th minute, before a late tap-in from Mason Mount booked Chelsea their place in the Champions League Final in Istanbul. Their win set up an all-English affair after Manchester City had secured their maiden appearance in the final the day before, defeating Paris Saint-Germain over two legs.

Chelsea's next match in the Premier League was against their Champions League final opponents, Manchester City, at the City of Manchester Stadium. Raheem Sterling scored first for the Citizens 44 minutes in, with Sergio Agüero having a penalty saved by Édouard Mendy just before half-time. Hakim Ziyech scored the equaliser for the Blues in the 63rd minute, before a stoppage-time goal from Marcos Alonso saw Chelsea run out 2–1 winners, as Thomas Tuchel made it two consecutive victories against Pep Guardiola. Next, Chelsea took on ninth-placed Arsenal at home, with Mikel Arteta's Gunners already enduring a poor season. Chelsea were shockingly defeated 1–0, with a poor back pass from Jorginho allowing Emile Smith Rowe to score the winner for Arsenal, with Christian Pulisic also having a goal disallowed by VAR due to a handball. This was the first time had Chelsea had lost to Arsenal at home in nearly a decade, since a 3–5 defeat in October 2011.

On 15 May, Chelsea faced Leicester City in the FA Cup Final, which was Chelsea's first chance of winning silverware this season. It was a frustrating game for Tuchel's Blues, as they were denied by Kasper Schmeichel multiple times throughout the game, with a Youri Tielemans stunner in the 63rd minute putting Leicester 1–0 up. Chelsea thought they had found their equaliser through Ben Chilwell in the 88th minute, but was ruled out by VAR for offside, as the Foxes won their first ever FA Cup and Chelsea had lost the FA Cup Final for the second straight year. Chelsea had an immediate rematch against Leicester City three days later in the Premier League, with goals from Antonio Rüdiger and Jorginho giving Chelsea a 2–1 victory and strengthening their top four hopes, while leaving Leicester's Champions League hopes in danger. Chelsea's final Premier League match of the season saw them travel to Birmingham to face Aston Villa, on 23 May. Chelsea would go on to lose 2–1, but still finished fourth and secured their place in next season's Champions League, as elsewhere, Leicester City lost to Tottenham Hotspur.

On 29 May, Chelsea faced Manchester City in the Champions League Final. It was the third time in Chelsea's 116-year history that they had competed in the Champions League final, losing against Manchester United in 2008 and defeating Bayern Munich in 2012. Chelsea went into the match as the underdogs, similarly to 2012, and defeated Manchester City 1–0 to win the Champions League, with Kai Havertz's goal in the first-half goal sealing Chelsea's second Champions League title. Chelsea became the third English club to win the Champions League multiple times, after Liverpool (2005, 2019) and Manchester United (1999, 2008).

==== Final league position ====
Pos	Team	Pld	W	D	L	GF	GA	GD	Pts	Qualification or relegation
2	Manchester United	38	21	11	6	73	44	+29	74	Qualification for the Champions League group stage
3	Liverpool	38	20	9	9	68	42	+26	69	Qualification for the Champions League group stage
4	Chelsea	38	19	10	9	58	36	+22	67	Qualification for the Champions League group stage
5	Leicester City	38	20	6	12	68	50	+18	66	Qualification for the Europa League group stage (Note: Since the winners of the 2020–21 FA Cup, Leicester City, also qualified for the Europa League based on league position, the second Europa League group stage berth allocated to England was transferred to the sixth-placed team.)
6	West Ham United	38	19	8	11	62	47	+15	65	Qualification for the Europa League group stage

Source: Premier League
Rules for classification: 1) Points; 2) Goal difference; 3) Goals scored; 4) If the champions, relegated teams or qualified teams for UEFA competitions cannot be determined by rules 1 to 3, rules 4.1 to 4.3 are applied – 4.1) Points gained in head-to-head record between such teams; 4.2) Away goals scored in head-to-head record between such teams; 4.3) Play-offs

== Management team ==
Position	Name
Head coach	(Germany) Thomas Tuchel
Assistant head coach	(Germany) Arno Michels
Assistant coaches	(Hungary) Zsolt Lőw
Assistant coaches	(England) Anthony Barry
Assistant coaches	(England) Joe Edwards
Goalkeeper coach	(Portugal) Henrique Hilário
Assistant goalkeeper coach	(England) James Russell
Loan Player Technical Coach	(Italy) Carlo Cudicini

== Players ==
=== Squad information ===
Players and squad numbers last updated on 29 May 2021. Appearances include all competitions.
Note: Flags indicate national team as has been defined under FIFA eligibility rules. Players may hold more than one non-FIFA nationality.

No.	Name	Nat	Position(s)	Date of birth (age)	Signed in	Contract ends	Signed from	Transfer Fee	Apps.	Goals
Goalkeepers
1	Kepa Arrizabalaga	(Spain)	GK	3 October 1994 (aged 26)	2018	2025	(Spain) Athletic Bilbao	£71.5M	109	0
13	Willy Caballero	(Argentina)	GK	28 September 1981 (aged 39)	2017	2021	(England) Manchester City	Free	38	0
16	Édouard Mendy	(Senegal)	GK	1 March 1992 (aged 29)	2020	2025	(France) Rennes	£22M	44	0
Defenders
2	Antonio Rüdiger	(Germany)	CB	3 March 1993 (aged 28)	2017	2022	(Italy) Roma	£29M	149	7
3	Marcos Alonso	(Spain)	LWB / LB	28 December 1990 (aged 30)	2016	2023	(Italy) Fiorentina	£24M	166	24
4	Andreas Christensen	(Denmark)	CB	10 April 1996 (aged 25)	2013	2022	(England) Chelsea Academy	N/A	127	0
6	Thiago Silva (3rd captain)	(Brazil)	CB	22 September 1984 (aged 36)	2020	2022	(France) Paris Saint-Germain	Free	34	2
15	Kurt Zouma	(France)	CB	24 October 1994 (aged 26)	2014	2023	(France) Saint-Étienne	£12M	150	10
21	Ben Chilwell	(England)	LB / LWB	21 December 1996 (aged 24)	2020	2025	(England) Leicester City	£45M	42	4
24	Reece James	(England)	RB / RWB	8 December 1999 (aged 21)	2018	2025	(England) Chelsea Academy	N/A	84	3
28	César Azpilicueta (captain)	(Spain)	RB / CB / LB	29 August 1989 (aged 31)	2012	2022	(France) Marseille	£7M	429	14
33	Emerson	(Italy)	LB / LWB	3 August 1994 (aged 26)	2018	2022	(Italy) Roma	£18M	70	2
Midfielders
5	Jorginho (vice-captain)	(Italy)	CM / DM	20 December 1991 (aged 29)	2018	2023	(Italy) Napoli	£50M	141	17
7	N'Golo Kanté (4th captain)	(France)	CM / DM	21 March 1991 (aged 30)	2016	2023	(England) Leicester City	£32M	218	11
17	Mateo Kovačić	(Croatia)	CM	6 May 1994 (aged 27)	2018	2024	(Spain) Real Madrid	£45M	140	2
19	Mason Mount (5th captain)	(England)	CM / AM / CF / LW	10 January 1999 (aged 22)	2017	2024	(England) Chelsea Academy	N/A	107	17
22	Hakim Ziyech	(Morocco)	AM / RW	19 March 1993 (aged 28)	2020	2025	(Netherlands) Ajax	£37M	39	6
23	Billy Gilmour	(Scotland)	CM	11 June 2001 (aged 20)	2019	2023	(England) Chelsea Academy	N/A	22	0
29	Kai Havertz	(Germany)	AM / CF	11 June 1999 (aged 22)	2020	2025	(Germany) Bayer Leverkusen	£62M^{a}	45	9
55	Tino Anjorin	(England)	AM	23 November 2001 (aged 19)	2019	2025	(England) Chelsea Academy	N/A	5	0
Forwards
9	Tammy Abraham	(England)	ST	2 October 1997 (aged 23)	2016	2022	(England) Chelsea Academy	N/A	82	30
10	Christian Pulisic	(United States)	LW / RW	18 September 1998 (aged 22)	2019	2024	(Germany) Borussia Dortmund	£58M	77	17
11	Timo Werner	(Germany)	ST / LW	6 March 1996 (aged 25)	2020	2024	(Germany) RB Leipzig	£47.5M	52	12
18	Olivier Giroud	(France)	ST	30 September 1986 (aged 34)	2018	2022	(England) Arsenal	£18M	119	39
20	Callum Hudson-Odoi	(England)	RW / LW / RWB	7 November 2000 (aged 20)	2018	2024	(England) Chelsea Academy	N/A	98	13

a. Additional costs of £10 million to be paid.

== Transfers ==
=== In ===
==== Summer ====
Date	No.	Pos.	Player	From	Fee	Source
1 July 2020
1 July 2020		MF	(Sweden) Edwin Andersson	(Sweden) IFK Göteborg	£40,000	
1 July 2020		FW	(England) Malik Mothersille	(England) Leyton Orient	Free	
1 July 2020	22	MF	(Morocco) Hakim Ziyech	(Netherlands) Ajax	£36,000,000	
1 July 2020		MF	(Finland) Jimi Tauriainen	(Finland) HJK	Undisclosed	
1 July 2020	11	FW	(Germany) Timo Werner	(Germany) RB Leipzig	£47,700,000	
20 August 2020		DF	(Netherlands) Xavier Mbuyamba	(Spain) Barcelona	Free	
26 August 2020	21	DF	(England) Ben Chilwell	(England) Leicester City	£45,180,000	
27 August 2020		DF	(France) Malang Sarr	(France) Nice	Free	
28 August 2020	6	DF	(Brazil) Thiago Silva	(France) Paris Saint-Germain	Free	
4 September 2020	29	MF	(Germany) Kai Havertz	(Germany) Bayer Leverkusen	£72,000,000	
6 September 2020		GK	(England) Teddy Sharman-Lowe	(England) Burton Albion	Undisclosed	
24 September 2020	16	GK	(Senegal) Édouard Mendy	(France) Rennes	£21,600,000	
24 September 2020		FW	(Finland) Aleksi Heino	(Finland) Inter Turku	Undisclosed	

==== Winter ====
Date	No.	Pos.	Player	From	Fee	Source
6 October 2020		GK	(Morocco) Sami Tlemcani	(France) Paris FC	Undisclosed	
4 May 2021		MF	(England) Declan Frith	Unattached	Free	

=== Out ===
==== Summer ====
Date	No.	Pos.	Player	To	Fee	Source
1 July 2020
1 July 2020		MF	(Brazil) Nathan	(Brazil) Atlético Mineiro	£2,700,000	
1 July 2020		GK	(Northern Ireland) Josh Clarke	(England) Bournemouth	Free	
1 July 2020		FW	(England) Adrian Akande	(Wales) Swansea City	Free	
18 July 2020		DF	(England) Josh Grant	(England) Bristol Rovers	Free	
3 August 2020	50	GK	(Ivory Coast) Nicolas Tié	(Portugal) Vitória de Guimarães	Undisclosed	
12 August 2020		MF	(England) Jacob Maddox	(Portugal) Vitória de Guimarães	Undisclosed	
14 August 2020	10	MF	(Brazil) Willian	(England) Arsenal	Free	
1 September 2020		MF	(Croatia) Mario Pašalić	(Italy) Atalanta	£13,500,000	
1 September 2020	11	MF	(Spain) Pedro	(Italy) Roma	Free	
3 October 2020	49	DF	(Portugal) Marcel Lavinier	(England) Tottenham Hotspur	Free	
5 October 2020	60	GK	(England) Jake Askew	(England) Wealdstone	Free	
6 October 2020	54	DF	(England) Jordan Aina	(England) Fulham	Free	
13 October 2020	73	GK	(England) Kelechi Chibueze	Unattached (Note: Chibueze joined Leicester City on 6 February 2021)		
24 November 2020		DF	(England) Richard Nartey	(England) Burnley	Free	
27 November 2020	58	DF	(England) James Clark	(England) Wycombe Wanderers	Free	

==== Winter ====
Date	No.	Pos.	Player	To	Fee	Source
13 January 2021	38	FW	(England) Charlie Brown	(England) Milton Keynes Dons	Undisclosed	
14 January 2021		MF	(Brazil) Lucas Piazon	(Portugal) Braga	Undisclosed	
February 2021		FW	(England) Amani Richards	(England) Arsenal	Free	

=== Loan out ===
==== Summer ====
Date	Until	No.	Pos.	Player	To	Fee	Source
1 July 2020	14 January 2021		MF	(Brazil) Lucas Piazon	(Portugal) Rio Ave	Free	
2 July 2020	6 October 2020		FW	(England) Charlie Brown	(Belgium) Union SG	Free	
12 August 2020	End of season		MF	(Serbia) Danilo Pantić	(Serbia) Čukarički	Free	
17 August 2020	End of season	31	GK	(England) Jamie Cumming	(England) Stevenage	Free	
18 August 2020	End of season		DF	(England) Trevoh Chalobah	(France) Lorient	Free	
18 August 2020	End of season		FW	(England) Ike Ugbo	(Belgium) Cercle Brugge	Free	
20 August 2020	End of season		FW	(England) Izzy Brown	(England) Sheffield Wednesday	Free	
21 August 2020	End of season	57	FW	(Albania) Armando Broja	(Netherlands) Vitesse	Free	
24 August 2020	End of season		GK	(England) Jamal Blackman	(England) Rotherham United	Free	
26 August 2020	End of season		DF	(England) Marc Guehi	(Wales) Swansea City	Free	
6 September 2020	4 January 2021		GK	(England) Teddy Sharman-Lowe	(England) Burton Albion	Free	
7 September 2020	End of season	46	MF	(England) Tariq Uwakwe	(England) Accrington Stanley	Free	
7 September 2020	End of season		DF	(Wales) Ethan Ampadu	(England) Sheffield United	Free	
8 September 2020	End of season		MF	(Brazil) Kenedy	(Spain) Granada	Free	
10 September 2020	End of season	23	FW	(Belgium) Michy Batshuayi	(England) Crystal Palace	Free	
17 September 2020	End of season		MF	(England) Conor Gallagher	(England) West Bromwich Albion	Free	
18 September 2020	End of season		MF	(England) Lewis Baker	(Turkey) Trabzonspor	Free	
19 September 2020	End of season		DF	(Italy) Davide Zappacosta	(Italy) Genoa	Free	
21 September 2020	End of season	41	MF	(England) Luke McCormick	(England) Bristol Rovers	Free	
27 September 2020	24 January 2021	70	GK	(United States) Ethan Wady	(England) Dartford	Free	
30 September 2020	End of season	8	MF	(England) Ross Barkley	(England) Aston Villa	Free	
2 October 2020	End of season	44	MF	(England) Jon Russell	(England) Accrington Stanley	Free	
3 October 2020	End of season		DF	(United States) Matt Miazga	(Belgium) Anderlecht	Free	
5 October 2020	End of season		MF	(France) Tiémoué Bakayoko	(Italy) Napoli	£1,800,000	
5 October 2020	End of season	12	MF	(England) Ruben Loftus-Cheek	(England) Fulham	Free	
6 October 2020	End of season		DF	(France) Malang Sarr	(Portugal) Porto	Free	
6 October 2020	12 December 2020		MF	(England) George McEachran	(Netherlands) Maastricht	Free	
6 October 2020	End of season		MF	(Netherlands) Marco van Ginkel	(Netherlands) PSV	Free	
6 October 2020	11 January 2021		DF	(Netherlands) Juan Castillo	(Netherlands) AZ	Free	
9 October 2020	End of season	31	GK	(England) Nathan Baxter	(England) Accrington Stanley	Free	
13 October 2020	End of season	52	DF	(Netherlands) Ian Maatsen	(England) Charlton Athletic	Free	
15 October 2020	End of season		MF	(Nigeria) Victor Moses	(Russia) Spartak Moscow	Free	
16 October 2020	End of season		DF	(England) Jake Clarke-Salter	(England) Birmingham City	Free	

==== Winter ====
Date	Until	No.	Pos.	Player	To	Fee	Source
11 January 2021	End of season		DF	(Netherlands) Juan Castillo	(Netherlands) ADO Den Haag	Free	
18 January 2021	End of season		MF	(England) Danny Drinkwater	(Turkey) Kasımpaşa	Free	
22 January 2021	End of season	14	DF	(England) Fikayo Tomori	(Italy) Milan	Undisclosed	
30 January 2021	End of season		DF	(Ghana) Baba Rahman	(Greece) PAOK	Free	
1 February 2021	End of season	43	DF	(England) Jack Wakely	(England) Brighton & Hove Albion	Free	
1 February 2021	End of season		FW	(England) Malik Mothersille	(England) Derby County	Free	

=== Overall transfer activity ===
==== Expenditure ====
Summer: ▼£222,520,000

Winter: ▼£0

Total: ▼£222,520,000

==== Income ====
Summer: ▲£68,400,000

Winter: ▲£0

Total: ▲£68,400,000

==== Net totals ====
Summer: ▼£154,120,000

Winter: £0

Total: ▼£154,120,000

== Pre-season friendlies ==
Win Draw Loss Fixtures

29 August 2020 Friendly	Brighton & Hove Albion	1–1	Chelsea	Falmer
15:00 BST	Groß 90' (pen.)	Report	Werner 4'; Alonso (yellow card) 34'	Stadium: Falmer Stadium; Attendance: 2,524; Referee: Stuart Attwell (England)

== Competitions ==
=== Premier League ===
==== League table ====
Pos	Team	Pld	W	D	L	GF	GA	GD	Pts	Qualification or relegation
2	Manchester United	38	21	11	6	73	44	+29	74	Qualification for the Champions League group stage
3	Liverpool	38	20	9	9	68	42	+26	69	Qualification for the Champions League group stage
4	Chelsea	38	19	10	9	58	36	+22	67	Qualification for the Champions League group stage
5	Leicester City	38	20	6	12	68	50	+18	66	Qualification for the Europa League group stage (Note: Since the winners of the 2020–21 FA Cup, Leicester City, also qualified for the Europa League based on league position, the second Europa League group stage berth allocated to England was transferred to the sixth-placed team.)
6	West Ham United	38	19	8	11	62	47	+15	65	Qualification for the Europa League group stage

Source: Premier League
Rules for classification: 1) Points; 2) Goal difference; 3) Goals scored; 4) If the champions, relegated teams or qualified teams for UEFA competitions cannot be determined by rules 1 to 3, rules 4.1 to 4.3 are applied – 4.1) Points gained in head-to-head record between such teams; 4.2) Away goals scored in head-to-head record between such teams; 4.3) Play-offs

==== Results summary ====
Overall								Home						Away					
Pld	W	D	L	GF	GA	GD	Pts	W	D	L	GF	GA	GD	W	D	L	GF	GA	GD
38	19	10	9	58	36	+22	67	9	6	4	31	18	+13	10	4	5	27	18	+9

Source: Soccerway

==== Results by matchday ====
Matchday	1	2	3	4	5	6	7	8	9	10	11	12	13	14	15	16	17	18	19	20	21	22	23	24	25	26	27	28	29	30	31	32	33	34	35	36	37	38
Ground	A	H	A	H	H	A	A	H	A	H	H	A	A	H	A	H	H	A	A	H	H	A	A	H	A	H	H	A	A	H	A	H	A	H	A	H	H	A
Result	W	L	D	W	D	D	W	W	W	D	W	L	L	W	L	D	L	W	L	D	W	W	W	W	D	D	W	W	D	L	W	D	W	W	W	L	W	L
Position	3	11	9	7	8	10	7	5	3	3	3	5	7	5	8	6	9	9	9	8	7	6	5	4	5	5	4	4	4	5	5	4	4	4	3	4	3	4

A = Away; H = Home; W = Win; D = Draw; L = Loss

==== Score overview ====
Win Draw Loss

Opposition	Home score	Away score	Aggregate score	Double
Arsenal	0–1	1–3	1–4	No
Aston Villa	1–1	1–2	2–3	No
Brighton	0–0	3–1	3–1	No
Burnley	2–0	3–0	5–0	Yes
Crystal Palace	4–0	4–1	8–1	Yes
Everton	2–0	0–1	2–1	No
Fulham	2–0	1–0	3–0	Yes
Leeds United	3–1	0–0	3–1	No
Leicester City	2–1	0–2	2–3	No
Liverpool	0–2	1–0	1–2	No
Manchester City	1–3	2–1	3–4	No
Manchester United	0–0	0–0	0–0	No
Newcastle United	2–0	2–0	4–0	Yes
Sheffield United	4–1	2–1	6–2	Yes
Southampton	3–3	1–1	4–4	No
Tottenham Hotspur	0–0	1–0	1–0	No
West Bromwich Albion	2–5	3–3	5–8	No
West Ham United	3–0	1–0	4–0	Yes
Wolves	0–0	1–2	1–2	No

==== Matches ====
14 September 2020 1	Brighton & Hove Albion	1–3	Chelsea	Falmer
20:00 BST	Trossard 54'; Lamptey (yellow card) 81'	Report	Jorginho 23' (pen.); James 56'; Zouma 66'	Stadium: Falmer Stadium; Attendance: 0 Referee: Craig Pawson

20 September 2020 2	Chelsea	0–2	Liverpool	London
16:30 BST	Christensen (red card) 45+1'; Jorginho (penalty missed) 75'	Report	Mané 50', 54'	Stadium: Stamford Bridge; Attendance: 0 Referee: Paul Tierney

26 September 2020 3	West Bromwich Albion	3–3	Chelsea	West Bromwich
17:30 BST	Robinson 4', 25'; Bartley 27'; Furlong (yellow card) 82'	Report	Alonso (yellow card) 8'; James (yellow card) 27'; Mount 54'; Hudson-Odoi 70'; Christensen (yellow card) 86'; Abraham 90+3'	Stadium: The Hawthorns; Attendance: 0 Referee: Jonathan Moss

3 October 2020 4	Chelsea	4–0	Crystal Palace	London
12:30 BST	Chilwell 50'; Azpilicueta (yellow card) 64'; Zouma 66'; Kanté (yellow card) 70'; Jorginho 78' (pen.), 82' (pen.)	Report		Stadium: Stamford Bridge; Attendance: 0 Referee: Michael Oliver

17 October 2020 5	Chelsea	3–3	Southampton	London
16:00 BST	Werner 15', 28'; Chilwell (yellow card) 48'; Havertz 59'	Report	Ings 43'; Adams 57'; Romeu (yellow card) 84'; Vestergaard 90+2'	Stadium: Stamford Bridge; Attendance: 0 Referee: Peter Bankes

24 October 2020 6	Manchester United	0–0	Chelsea	Manchester
17:30 BST	Shaw (yellow card) 39'; Fred (yellow card) 46'; Rashford (yellow card) 76'	Report	Havertz (yellow card) 45+1'	Stadium: Old Trafford; Attendance: 0 Referee: Martin Atkinson

31 October 2020 7	Burnley	0–3	Chelsea	Burnley
15:00 GMT	Long (yellow card) 49'	Report	Ziyech 26'; Zouma 63'; Werner 70'	Stadium: Turf Moor; Attendance: 0 Referee: David Coote

7 November 2020 8	Chelsea	4–1	Sheffield United	London
15:00 GMT	Abraham 23'; Chilwell 34'; Thiago Silva 77'; Werner 80'	Report	McGoldrick 9'; Egan (yellow card) 37'; Berge (yellow card) 75'	Stadium: Stamford Bridge; Attendance: 0 Referee: Jonathan Moss

21 November 2020 9	Newcastle United	0–2	Chelsea	Newcastle
12:30 GMT	Hayden (yellow card) 39'; Murphy (yellow card) 45'	Report	Fernández 10' (o.g.); Abraham 65'	Stadium: St James' Park; Attendance: 0 Referee: Craig Pawson

29 November 2020 10	Chelsea	0–0	Tottenham Hotspur	London
16:30 GMT	Ziyech (yellow card) 29'; James (yellow card) 53'; Zouma (yellow card) 55'; Mount (yellow card) 76'	Report	Bergwijn (yellow card) 50'; Reguilón (yellow card) 89'	Stadium: Stamford Bridge; Attendance: 0 Referee: Paul Tierney

5 December 2020 11	Chelsea	3–1	Leeds United	London
20:00 GMT	Giroud 27'; Zouma 61'; Pulisic 90+3'	Report	Bamford 4'; Llorente (yellow card) 74'; Raphinha (yellow card) 90+5'	Stadium: Stamford Bridge; Attendance: 2,000; Referee: Kevin Friend

12 December 2020 12	Everton	1–0	Chelsea	Liverpool
20:00 GMT	Sigurðsson 22' (pen.); Richarlison (yellow card) 24'; Doucouré (yellow card) 80'	Report	Kanté (yellow card) 45+3'; James (yellow card) 59'; Thiago Silva (yellow card) 65'	Stadium: Goodison Park; Attendance: 2,000; Referee: Jonathan Moss

15 December 2020 13	Wolverhampton Wanderers	2–1	Chelsea	Wolverhampton
18:00 GMT	Podence 66', (yellow card) 77'; Semedo (yellow card) 90+4'; Neto 90+5'	Report	Giroud 49'; Mount (yellow card) 60'; Kanté (yellow card) 85'	Stadium: Molineux; Attendance: 0 Referee: Stuart Attwell

21 December 2020 14	Chelsea	3–0	West Ham United	London
20:00 GMT	Thiago Silva 10'; Abraham 78', 80'	Report		Stadium: Stamford Bridge; Attendance: 0 Referee: Chris Kavanagh

26 December 2020 15	Arsenal	3–1	Chelsea	London
17:30 GMT	Marí (yellow card) 16'; Lacazette 34' (pen.); Xhaka 44'; Saka 56'; Tierney (yellow card) 83'	Report	Thiago Silva (yellow card) 73'; Abraham 85'; Jorginho (penalty missed) 90+1	Stadium: Emirates; Attendance: 0 Referee: Michael Oliver

28 December 2020 16	Chelsea	1–1	Aston Villa	London
17:30 GMT	Giroud 34', (yellow card) 71'; Azpilicueta (yellow card) 45+2'; Kanté (yellow card) 74'	Report	El Ghazi 50', (yellow card) 71'	Stadium: Stamford Bridge; Attendance: 0 Referee: Stuart Attwell

3 January 2021 17	Chelsea	1–3	Manchester City	London
16:30 GMT	Pulisic (yellow card) 45+1'; Kanté (yellow card) 53'; Kovačić (yellow card) 71'; Hudson-Odoi 90+2'	Report	Gündoğan 18'; Foden 21'; De Bruyne 34'; Silva (yellow card) 90'	Stadium: Stamford Bridge; Attendance: 0 Referee: Anthony Taylor

16 January 2021 18	Fulham	0–1	Chelsea	London
17:30 GMT	Robinson (red card) 44'; Reid (yellow card) 69'; Lookman (yellow card) 88'	Report	Ziyech (yellow card) 72'; Mount 78'; Thiago Silva (yellow card) 82'; Azpilicueta (yellow card) 90+4'	Stadium: Craven Cottage; Attendance: 0 Referee: Peter Bankes

19 January 2021 19	Leicester City	2–0	Chelsea	Leicester
20:15 GMT	Ndidi 6'; Maddison 41'; Fofana (yellow card) 85'	Report	Havertz (yellow card) 29'; Kovačić (yellow card) 51'; Ziyech (yellow card) 89'	Stadium: King Power; Attendance: 0 Referee: Craig Pawson

27 January 2021 20	Chelsea	0–0	Wolverhampton Wanderers	London
18:00 GMT	Chilwell (yellow card) 62'	Report	Neto (yellow card) 51'	Stadium: Stamford Bridge; Attendance: 0 Referee: Andrew Madley

31 January 2021 21	Chelsea	2–0	Burnley	London
12:00 GMT	Azpilicueta 40'; Alonso 84'	Report	Westwood (yellow card) 60'	Stadium: Stamford Bridge; Attendance: 0 Referee: Graham Scott

4 February 2021 22	Tottenham Hotspur	0–1	Chelsea	Tottenham
20:00 GMT	Alderweireld (yellow card) 50'; Højbjerg (yellow card) 63'	Report	Jorginho 24' (pen.); Pulisic (yellow card) 79'; Kanté (yellow card) 81'; Azpilicueta (yellow card) 88'	Stadium: Tottenham Hotspur Stadium; Attendance: 0 Referee: Andre Marriner

7 February 2021 23	Sheffield United	1–2	Chelsea	Sheffield
19:15 GMT	Basham (yellow card) 17'; Rüdiger 54' (o.g.)	Report	Mount 43'; Jorginho 58' (pen.)	Stadium: Bramall Lane; Attendance: 0 Referee: Kevin Friend

15 February 2021 24	Chelsea	2–0	Newcastle United	London
20:00 GMT	Giroud 31'; Werner 39'	Report		Stadium: Stamford Bridge; Attendance: 0 Referee: Peter Bankes

20 February 2021 25	Southampton	1–1	Chelsea	Southampton
12:30 GMT	Minamino 33'; McCarthy (yellow card) 90+2'	Report	Mount 54' (pen.); Alonso (yellow card) 80'	Stadium: St. Mary's; Attendance: 0 Referee: Anthony Taylor

28 February 2021 26	Chelsea	0–0	Manchester United	London
16:30 GMT	Chilwell (yellow card) 62'	Report	Fred (yellow card) 50'; Maguire (yellow card) 79'	Stadium: Stamford Bridge; Attendance: 0 Referee: Stuart Attwell

4 March 2021 27	Liverpool	0–1	Chelsea	Liverpool
20:15 GMT		Report	Mount 42'	Stadium: Anfield; Attendance: 0 Referee: Martin Atkinson

8 March 2021 28	Chelsea	2–0	Everton	London
18:00 GMT	Godfrey 31' (o.g.); Jorginho 65' (pen.)	Report	Holgate (yellow card) 17'; Digne (yellow card) 50'; Davies (yellow card) 90'	Stadium: Stamford Bridge; Attendance: 0 Referee: David Coote

13 March 2021 29	Leeds United	0–0	Chelsea	Leeds
12:30 GMT	Roberts (yellow card) 23'; Alioski (yellow card) 71'; Rodrigo (yellow card) 75'	Report		Stadium: Elland Road; Attendance: 0 Referee: Kevin Friend

3 April 2021 30	Chelsea	2–5	West Bromwich Albion	London
12:30 BST	Thiago Silva (yellow card) 5' (yellow-red card) 29'; Pulisic 27'; Kovačić (yellow card) 66'; Mount 71'	Report	Diagne (yellow card) 14', (goal) 68'; Pereira 45+2', 45+4'; Robinson 63', 90+1'	Stadium: Stamford Bridge; Attendance: 0 Referee: David Coote

10 April 2021 31	Crystal Palace	1–4	Chelsea	London
17:30 BST	Kouyaté (yellow card) 29'; Benteke 63'	Report	Havertz 8'; Pulisic 10', 78'; Zouma 30'	Stadium: Selhurst Park; Attendance: 0 Referee: Michael Oliver

20 April 2021 32	Chelsea	0–0	Brighton & Hove Albion	London
20:00 BST	Jorginho (yellow card) 35'; Zouma (yellow card) 35'	Report	White (yellow card) 73' (yellow-red card) 90+2'	Stadium: Stamford Bridge; Attendance: 0 Referee: Stuart Attwell

24 April 2021 33	West Ham United	0–1	Chelsea	London
17:30 BST	Balbuena (red card) 81'	Report	Werner (yellow card) 35', (goal) 43'; Christensen (yellow card) 42'; Mendy (yellow card) 90+4'; Kanté (yellow card) 90+5'	Stadium: London; Attendance: 0 Referee: Chris Kavanagh

1 May 2021 34	Chelsea	2–0	Fulham	London
17:30 BST	Havertz 10', 49'; Zouma (yellow card) 41'	Report	Aina (yellow card) 90+4'	Stadium: Stamford Bridge; Attendance: 0 Referee: Kevin Friend

8 May 2021 35	Manchester City	1–2	Chelsea	Manchester
17:30 BST	Sterling (yellow card) 12', (goal) 44'; Agüero (penalty missed) 45+3'; Gabriel Jesus (yellow card) 90'	Report	Ziyech 63'; Alonso 90+2'	Stadium: City of Manchester Stadium; Attendance: 0 Referee: Anthony Taylor

12 May 2021 36	Chelsea	0–1	Arsenal	London
20:15 BST		Report	Smith Rowe 16'; Partey (yellow card) 90+4'	Stadium: Stamford Bridge; Attendance: 0 Referee: Andre Marriner

18 May 2021 37	Chelsea	2–1	Leicester City	London
20:15 BST	Rüdiger 47'; Jorginho 66' (pen.); Azpilicueta (yellow card) 87'; Mendy (yellow card) 90+1'	Report	Pérez (yellow card) 32'; Iheanacho 76'; Fofana (yellow card) 82'; Ndidi (yellow card) 89'; Pereira (yellow card) 90+4'; Amartey (yellow card) 90+5'	Stadium: Stamford Bridge; Attendance: 7,195; Referee: Mike Dean

23 May 2021 38	Aston Villa	2–1	Chelsea	Birmingham
16:00 BST	Traoré 43'; El Ghazi 52' (pen.); McGinn (yellow card) 65'; Nakamba (yellow card) 74'; Martínez (yellow card) 81'	Report	Jorginho (yellow card) 45'; Werner (yellow card) 45+2'; Kovačić (yellow card) 49'; Chilwell 70'; Azpilicueta (red card) 89'; Arrizabalaga (yellow card) 90+5'	Stadium: Villa Park; Attendance: 10,000; Referee: Stuart Attwell

=== FA Cup ===
Chelsea got the right to enter the 2020–21 FA Cup in the third round proper along with the other Premier League and Championship clubs. The third round draw was made on 30 November, and Chelsea were drawn against League Two side Morecambe. The draw for the fourth and fifth round were made on 11 January, conducted by Peter Crouch. In the fourth round, Chelsea overcame Championship club Luton Town by a score of 3–1, with Tammy Abraham scoring all three goals for his side. In doing so, Abraham became the first Englishman to a score a hat-trick for Chelsea in the FA Cup since manager Frank Lampard in 2007, and he became the first Chelsea youth team product to score ten or more goals in back-to-back seasons since Mike Fillery in 1982–83. The match against Luton Town was Lampard's last in charge as he was sacked the following day. The draw for the quarter-finals was made, live on BT Sport by Karen Carney on 11 February. The draw for the semi-finals was made, live on BBC One by Dion Dublin on 21 March. Chelsea reached the 2021 FA Cup Final after defeating Manchester City 1–0 in the semi-final with a goal from Hakim Ziyech. However, Chelsea would end up losing the final 1–0 to Leicester City following a controversial goal from Youri Tielemans.

10 January 2021 Third round	Chelsea	4–0	Morecambe	London
13:30 GMT	Mount 18'; Werner 44'; Hudson-Odoi 49'; Havertz 85'	Report	Gibson (yellow card) 78'	Stadium: Stamford Bridge; Attendance: 0 Referee: Darren England

24 January 2021 Fourth round	Chelsea	3–1	Luton Town	London
12:00 GMT	Abraham 11', 17', 74'; Werner (penalty missed) 86'	Report	Clark 30', (yellow card) 85'	Stadium: Stamford Bridge; Attendance: 0 Referee: David Coote

11 February 2021 Fifth round	Barnsley	0–1	Chelsea	Barnsley
20:00 GMT		Report	Abraham 64'	Stadium: Oakwell; Attendance: 0 Referee: Martin Atkinson

21 March 2021 Quarter-finals	Chelsea	2–0	Sheffield United	London
13:30 GMT	Norwood 24' (o.g.); Ziyech 90+2'	Report		Stadium: Stamford Bridge; Attendance: 0 Referee: Andrew Madley

17 April 2021 Semi-finals	Chelsea	1–0	Manchester City	London
17:30 BST	James (yellow card) 34'; Ziyech 55'; Azpilicueta (yellow card) 90'	Report	Fernandinho (yellow card) 65'; Laporte (yellow card) 90+2'; Dias (yellow card) 90+5'	Stadium: Wembley Stadium; Attendance: 0 Referee: Mike Dean

15 May 2021 Final	Chelsea	0–1	Leicester City	London
17:30 BST	Werner (yellow card) 40'	Report	Fofana (yellow card) 36'; Tielemans 63'	Stadium: Wembley Stadium; Attendance: 20,000; Referee: Michael Oliver

=== EFL Cup ===
The draw for both the second and third round were confirmed on September 6, live on Sky Sports by Phil Babb. In the third round, Chelsea were drawn at home against Championship side Barnsley. Tammy Abraham opened the scoring in the 19th minute, slotting past former Blues keeper Brad Collins. New signing Kai Havertz then latched on to Mason Mount's pass after a clever Abraham dummy and slid left-footed effort into the bottom corner to open his Chelsea account. Ross Barkley made it three after the break before Abraham's neat flick teed Havertz up for a simple finish inside the area. Abraham then found Havertz for his hat-trick goal in the 65th minute and Olivier Giroud finished the scoring to make it 6–0 with seven minutes to go.

The fourth round draw was conducted on 17 September 2020 by Laura Woods and Lee Hendrie live on Sky Sports; Chelsea were handed an away game against Tottenham Hotspur, led by former manager José Mourinho. Chelsea went in front against Spurs with new signing Timo Werner netting his first goal for the club in the 19th minute. However, Erik Lamela would equalize for Tottenham with six minutes to go and the hosts would go on to win in the penalty shoot-out after a solitary miss from Chelsea midfielder Mason Mount.

23 September 2020 Third round	Chelsea	6–0	Barnsley	London
19:45 BST	Abraham 19'; Havertz 28', 55', 65'; Barkley 49'; Giroud 83'	Report	Collins (yellow card) 45' (yellow-red card) 65'	Stadium: Stamford Bridge; Attendance: 0 Referee: Darren Bond

29 September 2020 Fourth round	Tottenham Hotspur	1–1 (5–4 p)	Chelsea	London
19:45 BST	Aurier (yellow card) 59'; Tanganga (yellow card) 61'; Lamela 84'	Report	Werner 19'; Kovačić (yellow card) 45+2'; Jorginho (yellow card) 83'	Stadium: Tottenham Hotspur Stadium; Attendance: 0 Referee: Lee Mason
	Penalties
	Dier (penalty scored); Lamela (penalty scored); Højbjerg (penalty scored); Lucas (penalty scored); Kane (penalty scored)		(penalty scored) Abraham; (penalty scored) Azpilicueta; (penalty scored) Jorginho; (penalty scored) Emerson; (penalty missed) Mount

=== UEFA Champions League ===
The group stage draw was held on 1 October 2020 with Chelsea being placed in Group E along with Europa League holders Sevilla and two competition debutants in Krasnodar of Russia and Stade Rennes of France. Chelsea progressed as group winners having won four matches and drawing the other two. This included a convincing 4–0 away win versus Sevilla with Olivier Giroud scoring all four. In the draw for the round of 16, Chelsea were pitted against Spanish side Atlético Madrid, setting up the eighth and ninth matches between the clubs in just over a decade, following group stage clashes in 2009–10, a solitary matchup in the 2012 UEFA Super Cup, a semi-final tie in 2013–14, and another group stage meeting in the Champions League in 2017–18. Chelsea would go on to win the first leg 1–0 after a goal from Olivier Giroud. Chelsea moved on to the quarter-finals after a 2–0 second-leg win, with a goal in each half from Hakim Ziyech and Emerson, and were drawn against FC Porto. It was the ninth meeting between the two clubs, the most recent being a 2–0 Chelsea victory in the group stage of the 2015–16 UEFA Champions League. Chelsea defeated Porto 2–0 in the first match. They advanced 2–1 on aggregate despite losing 1–0 in the second leg to Porto. By doing this, Chelsea reached the Semi-finals, a feat they had not accomplished since 2013–14 campaign. Chelsea were drawn against Real Madrid in the Semi-finals. The first leg was played in the Alfredo Di Stéfano. Christian Pulisic gave Chelsea the lead before Karim Benzema equalized for the home side, the match ended in a 1–1 draw. In the second leg at Stamford Bridge, Timo Werner and Mason Mount gave Chelsea a 2–0 win (3–1 on aggregate). This meant that Chelsea would be in the final, the first time Chelsea had reached the final since the 2011–12 campaign. In the final at the Estádio do Dragão, Chelsea would emerge victorious against Manchester City 1–0 with a goal from Kai Havertz sealing their first Champions League title since the 2011–12 campaign.

==== Group stage ====
Group E
Pos	Team	Pld	W	D	L	GF	GA	GD	Pts	Qualification
1	(England) Chelsea	6	4	2	0	14	2	+12	14	Advance to knockout phase
2	(Spain) Sevilla	6	4	1	1	9	8	+1	13	Advance to knockout phase
3	(Russia) Krasnodar	6	1	2	3	6	11	−5	5	Transfer to Europa League
4	(France) Rennes	6	0	1	5	3	11	−8	1	

Source: UEFA
Rules for classification: Group stage tiebreakers

20 October 2020 1	Chelsea (England)	0–0	(Spain) Sevilla	London, England
20:00 BST	Jorginho (yellow card) 14'; Mount (yellow card) 36'; Chilwell (yellow card) 64'	Report	Acuña (yellow card) 43'; Jordán (yellow card) 87'	Stadium: Stamford Bridge; Attendance: 0 Referee: Davide Massa (Italy)

28 October 2020 2	Krasnodar (Russia)	0–4	(England) Chelsea	Krasnodar, Russia
18:55 CET	Olsson (yellow card) 22'; Martynovich (yellow card) 76'	Report	Jorginho (penalty missed) 14'; Hudson-Odoi 37'; Werner 76' (pen.); Ziyech 80'; Pulisic 90'	Stadium: Krasnodar Stadium; Attendance: 10,544; Referee: Ali Palabıyık (Turkey)

4 November 2020 3	Chelsea (England)	3–0	(France) Rennes	London, England
20:00 GMT	Werner 10' (pen.), 41' (pen.); Kanté (yellow card) 26'; Ziyech (yellow card) 32'; Abraham 50'; Jorginho (yellow card) 65'; Kovačić (yellow card) 79'	Report	Dalbert (yellow card) 9' (yellow-red card) 40'; Del Castillo (yellow card) 89'	Stadium: Stamford Bridge; Attendance: 0 Referee: Felix Zwayer (Germany)

24 November 2020 4	Rennes (France)	1–2	(England) Chelsea	Rennes, France
18:55 CET	Guirassy 85'; Grenier (yellow card) 87'; Bourigeaud (yellow card) 90+3'	Report	Hudson-Odoi 22'; Giroud 90+1'	Stadium: Roazhon Park; Attendance: 0 Referee: Björn Kuipers (Netherlands)

2 December 2020 5	Sevilla (Spain)	0–4	(England) Chelsea	Seville, Spain
21:00 CET	Gudelj (yellow card) 15'; Idrissi (yellow card) 41'; Gómez (yellow card) 82'; Jordán (yellow card) 90+1'	Report	Giroud 8', 54', 74', 83' (pen.); Kovačić (yellow card) 37'; Pulisic (yellow card) 43'; Mount (yellow card) 90+1'; Ziyech (yellow card) 90+1'	Stadium: Ramón Sánchez Pizjuán; Attendance: 0 Referee: Artur Soares Dias (Portugal)

8 December 2020 6	Chelsea (England)	1–1	(Russia) Krasnodar	London, England
20:00 GMT	Jorginho 28' (pen.); Azpilicueta (yellow card) 82'	Report	Cabella 24'	Stadium: Stamford Bridge; Attendance: 2,000; Referee: Pavel Královec (Czech Republic)

==== Knockout phase ====
===== Round of 16 =====
The round of 16 draw was held on 14 December 2020.

23 February 2021 First leg	Atlético Madrid (Spain)	0–1	(England) Chelsea	Bucharest, Romania
21:00 CET (UTC+1)	Llorente (yellow card) 63'; Lemar (yellow card) 90+3'	Report	Mount (yellow card) 1'; Jorginho (yellow card) 64'; Giroud 68'	Stadium: Arena Națională; Attendance: 0 Referee: Felix Brych (Germany)
Note: The match, originally to be played at the Metropolitano Stadium in Madrid, was moved to Arena Națională in Bucharest, due to restrictions related to the COVID-19 pandemic imposed by Spain on travelers from the United Kingdom out of concern of the variant B.1.1.7.

17 March 2021 Second leg	Chelsea (England)	2–0 (3–0 agg.)	(Spain) Atlético Madrid	London, England
20:00 GMT (UTC±0)	Havertz (yellow card) 30'; Ziyech 34'; Emerson 90+4'	Report	Lodi (yellow card) 31'; Saúl (yellow card) 51'; Giménez (yellow card) 60'; Koke (yellow card) 72'; Savić (red card) 82'	Stadium: Stamford Bridge; Attendance: 0 Referee: Daniele Orsato (Italy)

===== Quarter-finals =====
The draw for the quarter-finals was held on 19 March 2021.

7 April 2021 First leg	Porto (Portugal)	0–2	(England) Chelsea	Seville, Spain
20:00 WEST (UTC+1)	Mbemba (yellow card) 63'; Grujić (yellow card) 79'	Report	Mount 32'; Chilwell 85'	Stadium: Ramón Sánchez Pizjuán; Attendance: 0 Referee: Slavko Vinčić (Slovenia)
Note: The match was played at Ramón Sánchez Pizjuán in Seville, due to travel restrictions related to the COVID-19 pandemic between Portugal and the United Kingdom.

13 April 2021 Second leg	Chelsea (England)	0–1 (2–1 agg.)	(Portugal) Porto	Seville, Spain
20:00 BST (UTC+1)		Report	Oliveira (yellow card) 46'; Corona (yellow card) 74'; Pepe (yellow card) 82'; Díaz (yellow card) 88'; Taremi 90+4', (yellow card) 90+5'	Stadium: Ramón Sánchez Pizjuán; Attendance: 0 Referee: Clément Turpin (France)
Note: The match was played at Ramón Sánchez Pizjuán in Seville, due to travel restrictions related to the COVID-19 pandemic between Portugal and the United Kingdom.

===== Semi-finals =====
The draw for the semi-finals was held on 19 March 2021, after the quarter-final draw.

27 April 2021 First leg	Real Madrid (Spain)	1–1	(England) Chelsea	Madrid, Spain
21:00 CEST (UTC+2)	Vinícius (yellow card) 27'; Benzema 29'; Kroos (yellow card) 60'; Marcelo (yellow card) 65'; Varane (yellow card) 78'; Odriozola (yellow card) 89'	Report	Pulisic 14', (yellow card) 38'	Stadium: Alfredo Di Stéfano; Attendance: 0 Referee: Danny Makkelie (Netherlands)
Note: Real Madrid played their home match at Alfredo Di Stéfano, Madrid, instead of their regular stadium Santiago Bernabéu, Madrid.

5 May 2021 Second leg	Chelsea (England)	2–0 (3–1 agg.)	(Spain) Real Madrid	London, England
20:00 BST (UTC+1)	Jorginho (yellow card) 14'; Werner 28'; Christensen (yellow card) 39'; Mount 85', (yellow card) 87'	Report	Ramos (yellow card) 36'; Nacho (yellow card) 62'; Kroos (yellow card) 72'; Valverde (yellow card) 90'	Stadium: Stamford Bridge; Attendance: 0 Referee: Daniele Orsato (Italy)

===== Final =====
29 May 2021 Final	Manchester City (England)	0–1	(England) Chelsea	Porto, Portugal
20:00 WEST PTT (UTC+1)	Gündoğan (yellow card) 35'; Gabriel Jesus (yellow card) 88'	Report	Havertz 42'; Rüdiger (yellow card) 57'	Stadium: Estádio do Dragão; Attendance: 14,110; Referee: Antonio Mateu Lahoz (Spain)
Note: The final was originally scheduled to be played in Atatürk Olympic Stadium in Istanbul. However, on 12 May, UEFA announced it had been moved to Portugal since the high COVID-19 infection rates in Turkey had led the UK government to place travel to Turkey on its red-list, meaning fans would have had to quarantine for ten days in a hotel at their expense on their return. Portugal at the same time was on the green-list which meant no travel restrictions at either end for those attending the final.

== Statistics ==
=== Appearances and goals ===
No.	Pos.	Player	Premier League		FA Cup		EFL Cup		UEFA Champions League		Total	
No.	Pos.	Player	Apps	Goals	Apps	Goals	Apps	Goals	Apps	Goals	Apps	Goals
1	GK	(Spain) Kepa Arrizabalaga	7	0	6	0	0	0	1	0	14	0
2	DF	(Germany) Antonio Rüdiger	19	1	4	0	0	0	11	0	34	1
3	DF	(Spain) Marcos Alonso	13	2	2	0	0	0	2	0	17	2
4	DF	(Denmark) Andreas Christensen	17	0	3	0	0	0	7	0	27	0
5	MF	(Italy) Jorginho	28	7	2	0	1	0	12	1	43	8
6	DF	(Brazil) Thiago Silva	23	2	2	0	1	0	8	0	34	2
7	MF	(France) N'Golo Kanté	30	0	4	0	1	0	13	0	48	0
9	FW	(England) Tammy Abraham	22	6	3	4	2	1	5	1	32	12
10	FW	(United States) Christian Pulisic	27	4	6	0	0	0	10	2	43	6
11	FW	(Germany) Timo Werner	35	6	4	1	1	1	12	4	52	12
13	GK	(Argentina) Willy Caballero	1	0	0	0	1	0	0	0	2	0
15	DF	(France) Kurt Zouma	24	5	5	0	2	0	5	0	36	5
16	GK	(Senegal) Édouard Mendy	31	0	0	0	1	0	12	0	44	0
17	MF	(Croatia) Mateo Kovačić	27	0	3	0	2	0	10	0	42	0
18	FW	(France) Olivier Giroud	17	4	4	0	2	1	8	6	31	11
19	MF	(England) Mason Mount	36	6	5	1	2	0	11	2	54	9
20	FW	(England) Callum Hudson-Odoi	23	2	5	1	2	0	7	2	37	5
21	DF	(England) Ben Chilwell	27	3	3	0	2	0	10	1	42	4
22	FW	(Morocco) Hakim Ziyech	23	2	6	2	0	0	10	2	39	6
23	MF	(Scotland) Billy Gilmour	5	0	4	0	0	0	2	0	11	0
24	DF	(England) Reece James	32	1	5	0	0	0	10	0	47	1
28	DF	(Spain) César Azpilicueta	26	1	4	0	2	0	11	0	43	1
29	MF	(Germany) Kai Havertz	27	4	5	1	1	3	12	1	45	9
33	DF	(Italy) Emerson	2	0	5	0	2	0	6	1	15	1
40	GK	(Croatia) Karlo Žiger	0	0	0	0	0	0	0	0	0	0
55	MF	(England) Tino Anjorin	0	0	2	0	0	0	1	0	3	0
Players have left the club
8	MF	(England) Ross Barkley	2	0	0	0	1	1	0	0	3	1
12	MF	(England) Ruben Loftus-Cheek	1	0	0	0	0	0	0	0	1	0
14	DF	(England) Fikayo Tomori	1	0	1	0	2	0	0	0	4	0

Last updated: 29 May 2021.
Source: FBref.com

=== Goalscorers ===
Rank	No.	Pos.	Player	Premier League	FA Cup	EFL Cup	UEFA Champions League	Total
1	9	FW	(England) Tammy Abraham	6	4	1	1	12
1	11	FW	(Germany) Timo Werner	6	1	1	4	12
3	18	FW	(France) Olivier Giroud	4	0	1	6	11
4	19	MF	(England) Mason Mount	6	1	0	2	9
4	29	MF	(Germany) Kai Havertz	4	1	3	1	9
6	5	MF	(Italy) Jorginho	7	0	0	1	8
7	10	FW	(United States) Christian Pulisic	4	0	0	2	6
7	22	MF	(Morocco) Hakim Ziyech	2	2	0	2	6
9	15	DF	(France) Kurt Zouma	5	0	0	0	5
9	20	FW	(England) Callum Hudson-Odoi	2	1	0	2	5
11	21	DF	(England) Ben Chilwell	3	0	0	1	4
12	3	DF	(Spain) Marcos Alonso	2	0	0	0	2
12	6	DF	(Brazil) Thiago Silva	2	0	0	0	2
14	2	DF	(Germany) Antonio Rüdiger	1	0	0	0	1
14	8	MF	(England) Ross Barkley	0	0	1	0	1
14	24	DF	(England) Reece James	1	0	0	0	1
14	28	DF	(Spain) César Azpilicueta	1	0	0	0	1
14	33	DF	(Italy) Emerson	0	0	0	1	1
Own goals				2	1	0	0	3
Totals				58	11	7	23	99

Last updated: 29 May 2021.
Source: FBref.com

=== Top assists ===
Rank	No.	Pos.	Player	Premier League	FA Cup	EFL Cup	UEFA Champions League	Total
1	11	FW	(Germany) Timo Werner	8	1	0	3	12
2	19	MF	(England) Mason Mount	5	0	1	2	8
3	21	DF	(England) Ben Chilwell	5	1	1	0	7
3	29	MF	(Germany) Kai Havertz	3	1	0	3	7
5	20	FW	(England) Callum Hudson-Odoi	3	2	0	0	5
5	24	DF	(England) Reece James	2	2	0	1	5
7	9	FW	(England) Tammy Abraham	1	0	2	1	4
7	10	MF	(United States) Christian Pulisic	2	0	0	2	4
7	22	MF	(Morocco) Hakim Ziyech	3	1	0	0	4
10	7	MF	(France) N'Golo Kanté	2	0	0	1	3
10	28	DF	(Spain) César Azpilicueta	2	1	0	0	3
12	5	MF	(Italy) Jorginho	1	0	0	1	2
12	17	MF	(Croatia) Mateo Kovačić	1	0	0	1	2
14	2	DF	(Germany) Antonio Rüdiger	0	0	0	1	1
Totals				38	9	4	16	67

Last updated: 29 May 2021.
Source: FBref.com

=== Clean sheets ===
Rank	No.	Pos.	Player	Premier League	FA Cup	EFL Cup	UEFA Champions League	Total
1	16	GK	(Senegal) Édouard Mendy	16	0	0	9	25
2	1	GK	(Spain) Kepa Arrizabalaga	2	4	0	0	6
3	13	GK	(Argentina) Willy Caballero	0	0	1	0	1
Totals				18	4	1	9	32

Last updated: 29 May 2021.
Source: FBref.com

=== Discipline ===
No.	Pos.	Player	Premier League			FA Cup			EFL Cup			UEFA Champions League			Total		
No.	Pos.	Player	Yellow card	(yellow card) (yellow-red card)	Red card	Yellow card	(yellow card) (yellow-red card)	Red card	Yellow card	(yellow card) (yellow-red card)	Red card	Yellow card	(yellow card) (yellow-red card)	Red card	Yellow card	(yellow card) (yellow-red card)	Red card
1	GK	(Spain) Kepa Arrizabalaga	1	0	0	0	0	0	0	0	0	0	0	0	1	0	0
2	DF	(Germany) Antonio Rüdiger	0	0	0	0	0	0	0	0	0	1	0	0	1	0	0
3	DF	(Spain) Marcos Alonso	2	0	0	0	0	0	0	0	0	0	0	0	2	0	0
4	DF	(Denmark) Andreas Christensen	2	0	1	0	0	0	0	0	0	1	0	0	3	0	1
5	MF	(Italy) Jorginho	2	0	0	0	0	0	1	0	0	4	0	0	7	0	0
6	DF	(Brazil) Thiago Silva	4	1	0	0	0	0	0	0	0	0	0	0	4	1	0
7	MF	(France) N'Golo Kanté	7	0	0	0	0	0	0	0	0	1	0	0	8	0	0
10	FW	(United States) Christian Pulisic	2	0	0	0	0	0	0	0	0	2	0	0	4	0	0
11	FW	(Germany) Timo Werner	2	0	0	1	0	0	0	0	0	0	0	0	3	0	0
15	DF	(France) Kurt Zouma	3	0	0	0	0	0	0	0	0	0	0	0	3	0	0
16	GK	(Senegal) Édouard Mendy	2	0	0	0	0	0	0	0	0	0	0	0	2	0	0
17	MF	(Croatia) Mateo Kovačić	4	0	0	0	0	0	1	0	0	2	0	0	7	0	0
18	FW	(France) Olivier Giroud	1	0	0	0	0	0	0	0	0	0	0	0	1	0	0
19	MF	(England) Mason Mount	2	0	0	0	0	0	0	0	0	4	0	0	6	0	0
21	DF	(England) Ben Chilwell	3	0	0	0	0	0	0	0	0	1	0	0	4	0	0
22	MF	(Morocco) Hakim Ziyech	3	0	0	0	0	0	0	0	0	2	0	0	5	0	0
24	DF	(England) Reece James	3	0	0	1	0	0	0	0	0	0	0	0	4	0	0
28	DF	(Spain) César Azpilicueta	5	0	1	1	0	0	0	0	0	1	0	0	7	0	1
29	MF	(Germany) Kai Havertz	2	0	0	0	0	0	0	0	0	1	0	0	3	0	0
Totals			50	1	2	3	0	0	2	0	0	20	0	0	75	1	2

Last updated: 29 May 2021.
Source: FBref.com

=== Summary ===
Competition	Pld	W	D	L	GF	GA	CS	Yellow card	(yellow card) (yellow-red card)	Red card
Premier League	38	19	10	9	58	36	18	50	1	2
FA Cup	6	5	0	1	11	2	4	3	0	0
EFL Cup	2	1	1	0	7	1	1	2	0	0
UEFA Champions League	13	9	3	1	23	4	8	20	0	0
Totals	59	34	14	11	99	43	31	75	1	2

Last updated: 29 May 2021.
Source: FBref.com

== Awards ==
=== Players ===
No.	Pos.	Player	Award	Source
2	DF	(Germany) Antonio Rüdiger	UEFA Champions League Squad of the Season	
5	MF	(Italy) Jorginho	UEFA Champions League Squad of the Season	
7	MF	(France) N'Golo Kanté	UEFA Champions League Final Man of the Match	
7	MF	(France) N'Golo Kanté	UEFA Champions League Squad of the Season	
16	GK	(Senegal) Édouard Mendy	UEFA Champions League Squad of the Season	
19	MF	(England) Mason Mount	Chelsea Player of the Year	
19	MF	(England) Mason Mount	Premier League Academy Graduate of the Year	
19	MF	(England) Mason Mount	UEFA Champions League Squad of the Season	
21	DF	(England) Ben Chilwell	UEFA Champions League Squad of the Season	
28	DF	(Spain) César Azpilicueta	UEFA Champions League Squad of the Season	

=== Manager ===
Manager	Award	Source
(Germany) Thomas Tuchel	Premier League Manager of the Month (March)	
