= Mason Mount =

English footballer (born 1999)

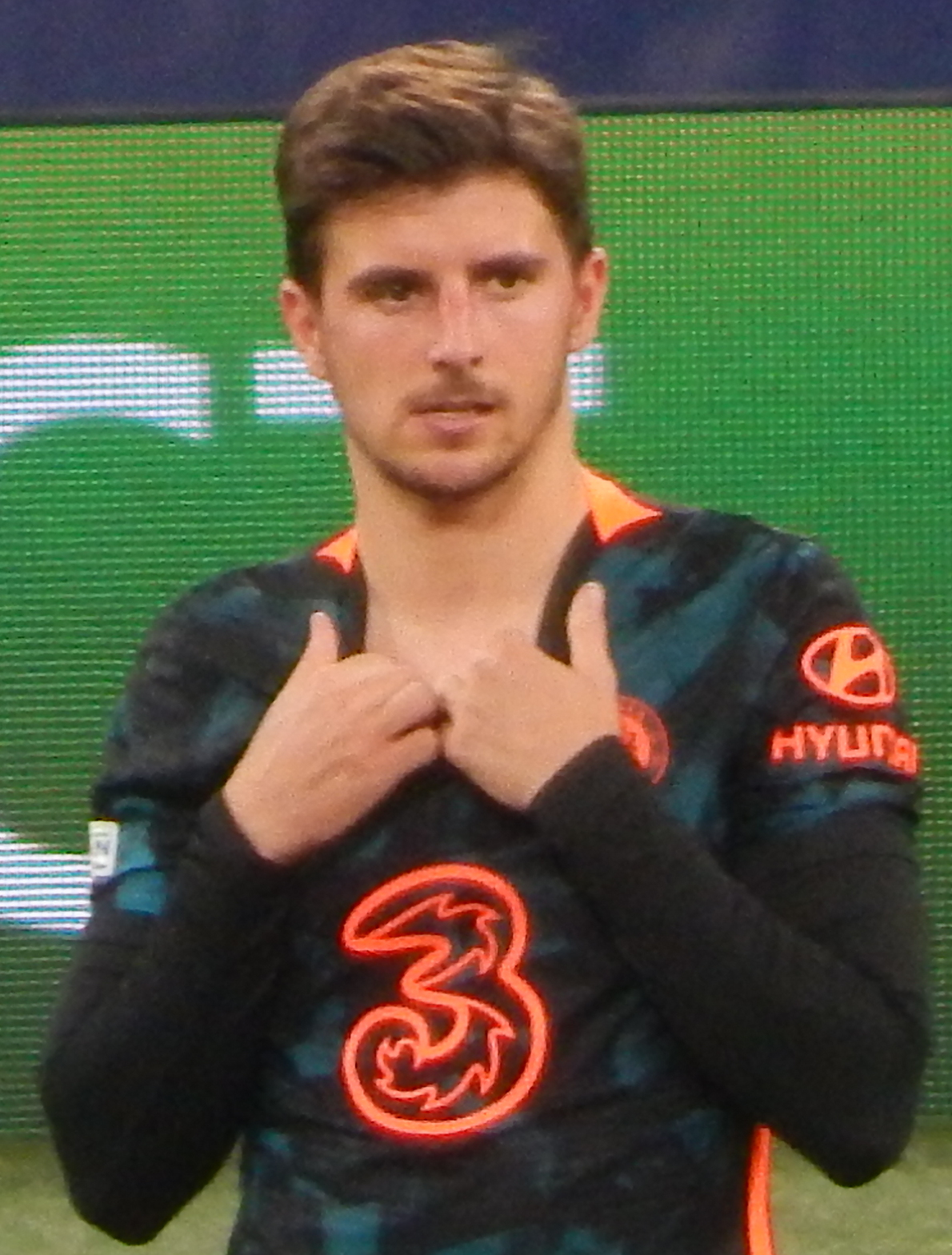
- Mount with Chelsea in 2021

Personal information
- Full name: Mason Tony Mount
- Date of birth: 10 January 1999 (age 27)
- Place of birth: Portsmouth, Hampshire, England
- Height: 5 ft 11 in (1.81 m)
- Position: Midfielder

Team information
- Current team: Manchester United
- Number: 7

Youth career
- Boarhunt Rovers
- United Services Portsmouth
- 2005–2017: Chelsea

Senior career*
Years	Team	Apps	(Gls)
2017–2023	Chelsea	129	(27)
2017–2018	→ Vitesse Arnhem (loan)	29	(9)
2018–2019	→ Derby County (loan)	35	(8)
2023–	Manchester United	60	(5)

International career
2014–2015	England U16	5	(0)
2015–2016	England U17	9	(2)
2016	England U18	5	(3)
2017–2018	England U19	17	(7)
2018–2019	England U21	4	(1)
2019–2022	England	36	(5)
Medal record
Men's football
Representing England
UEFA European Championship
Runner-up	2020 Europe
UEFA European Under-19 Championship
Winner	2017 Georgia
- * Club domestic league appearances and goals as of 20:54, 22 November 2026 (UTC)

Mason Tony Mount (born 10 January 1999) is an English professional footballer who plays as a midfielder for Premier League club Manchester United.

Mount began his senior club career with Chelsea, and joined Vitesse Arnhem and Derby County on consecutive loans between 2017 and 2019. He established himself as an integral player for Chelsea in the following years, and won the UEFA Champions League, the UEFA Super Cup, and the FIFA Club World Cup in 2021. He was named Chelsea Player of the Year in the 2020–21 and 2021–22 seasons. Mount left Chelsea in July 2023, and was signed by Manchester United for an initial transfer fee of £55 million.

Mount won the UEFA European Under-19 Championship with the England national under-19 team in 2017. He made his senior debut in 2019, aged 20, and was part of the England team at UEFA Euro 2020 and the 2022 FIFA World Cup.

== Early life ==
Mason Tony Mount was born on 10 January 1999 in Portsmouth, Hampshire, to parents Debbie and Tony Mount. His father was a former non-league footballer who later coached local clubs, including Havant Town. As a child, Mount played locally for Boarhunt Rovers and United Services Portsmouth. In 2003, at age 4, he spent one day a week training in the academies at Portsmouth and Chelsea. Citing Frank Lampard, Luka Modrić and Andrés Iniesta as his favourite players, Mount eventually joined Chelsea in 2005.

== Club career ==
=== Chelsea ===
At age 18, Mount was promoted to Chelsea's senior team; he previously debuted for the club's under-18 team in 2014, at age 15, and also appeared consistently for the club's under-21 team by 2016. Mount scored 10 goals in 30 games in the club's victorious 2016–17 U18 Premier League campaign. He also won two FA Youth Cups, the UEFA Youth League, and Chelsea Academy Player of the Year by 2017.

==== 2017–19: Loans to Vitesse and Derby County ====
Mount joined Dutch Eredivisie club Vitesse Arnhem on 24 July 2017 on a season-long loan. He made his first-team debut on 26 August, as a 77th-minute substitute during Vitesse's 2–1 home defeat against AZ. The following month, he was given his first start in Vitesse's KNVB Cup first-round defeat away to fifth-tier team Swift, playing the full 90 minutes of the 0–0 draw, which Swift won in a penalty shoot-out. He scored his first goal for Vitesse on 1 October in the 76th minute of a 1–1 home draw with Utrecht. Mount went on to appear in the Eredivisie Team of the Year and won Vitesse Player of the Year.

During Vitesse's Eredivisie European play-off semi-final first leg against ADO Den Haag on 9 May 2018, Mount scored his first hat-trick, as Vitesse won 5–2 away. In the second leg, Mount scored in a 2–1 win as Vitesse won 7–3 on aggregate. In the first leg of the final against Utrecht, Mount opened the scoring but was booked and therefore suspended for the second leg. Mount made 39 appearances in all competitions for Vitesse, scoring 14 times, before returning to Chelsea.

Mount joined Championship club Derby County on 17 July 2018 on a season-long loan. He scored a 60th-minute equaliser on his debut for Derby on 3 August 2018, during a 2–1 away victory over Reading. Mount was sidelined for two months after suffering a hamstring injury in a FA Cup game against Accrington Stanley. He returned in a 6–1 win over Rotherham United, winning a penalty for teammate Martyn Waghorn and later scoring. Two weeks later, he scored his second senior hat-trick in a 4–0 win against Bolton Wanderers, keeping Derby in contention for the play-offs.

On 15 May, Mount scored his eleventh goal of the season in Derby's 4–2 win at Leeds United in the Championship play-off semi-final. He went on to play the full match as Derby lost 2–1 to Aston Villa in the Championship play-off final at Wembley Stadium on 27 May.

==== 2019–20: First-team breakthrough ====
On 15 July 2019, Mount signed a new five-year contract with Chelsea, which would have kept him at the club until 2024. He made his competitive debut for Chelsea on 11 August 2019 in a 4–0 away defeat to Manchester United in the Premier League. He scored his first Chelsea goal a week later against Leicester City during Frank Lampard's home debut as manager at Stamford Bridge, a 1–1 draw, and added another in the next game away to Norwich City, in a 3–2 away win. On 17 September, he suffered an ankle injury against Valencia in the Champions League opener.

In March 2020, Mount was spoken to by Chelsea for ignoring self-isolation rules during the COVID-19 pandemic. While the entire squad was forced to self-isolate due to Callum Hudson-Odoi's positive COVID-19 test, Mount had gone to play football with friends, including West Ham United's Declan Rice. On 19 July 2020, Mount scored in the FA Cup semi-final 3–1 win against Manchester United, helping Chelsea earn a place in the FA Cup Final. On 22 July, he became the first Chelsea Academy graduate to make his first team debut and complete 50 appearances in the same season. On the final day of the 2019–20 Premier League season in a 2–0 victory against Wolverhampton Wanderers, Mount scored the first goal from a free kick and assisted Olivier Giroud for the second goal to help Chelsea secure a place in the 2020–21 UEFA Champions League. Mount was named in the starting 11 against Arsenal in the FA Cup final on 1 August – Chelsea would go on to lose 2–1.

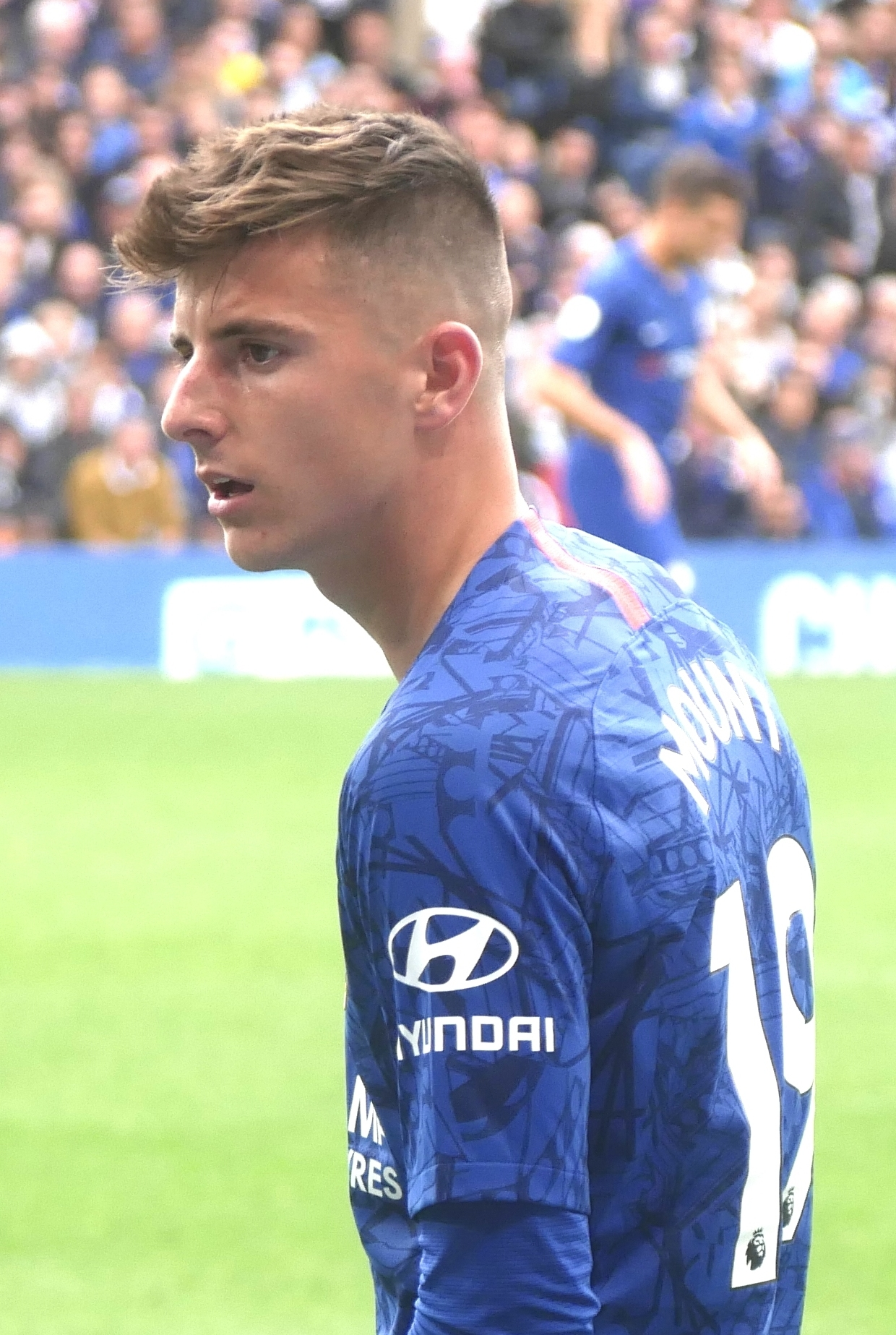
Mount with Chelsea 2019

==== 2020–21: Champions League win and Chelsea Player of the Year ====
Mount started the 2020–21 season well, as he featured in all Chelsea matches including the one against Barnsley in the third round of the EFL Cup on 23 September, which ended in a 6–0 win at home. Three days later on 26 September, Mount scored his first goal of the season against West Bromwich Albion as Chelsea came from 3–0 down to draw 3–3. In the next fixture, Mount missed the decisive penalty in Chelsea's 5–4 shoot-out loss away to Tottenham Hotspur in the fourth round of the EFL Cup on 29 September.

In January 2021, Mount scored in back-to-back games against Morecambe in the third round of the FA Cup and Fulham in the Premier League. On 24 January, he captained Chelsea for the first time in a 3–1 win at home over Luton Town in the FA Cup fourth round. On 4 March, Mount scored the only goal in a 1–0 away league win over Liverpool, handing the Reds their fifth consecutive league defeat at Anfield for the first time in their history.

Mount scored his first goal in European football in Chelsea's 2–0 win over Porto in the first leg of the Champions League quarter-final on 7 April, becoming the youngest Chelsea player to score in the Champions League knockout stage. On 27 April, he marked his 100th appearance for Chelsea in a 1–1 away draw against Real Madrid in the Champions League semi-final first leg. In the second leg at Stamford Bridge on 5 May, he scored the second goal in a 2–0 win, which helped Chelsea advance to the Champions League final 3–1 on aggregate.

Early in the season, Mount's presence in the Chelsea and England starting line-ups was alleged by fans and media to be because of favouritism by respective team managers, Lampard and Gareth Southgate. These doubts were allayed after Thomas Tuchel acknowledged Chelsea's growing reliance on Mount calling him "crucial for our game" and "an absolutely key player" and endorsed him as one of the best players in Europe. On 18 May, Mount was voted as Chelsea's Player of the Year. On 29 May, Mount provided the assist for Kai Havertz's goal, as Chelsea won 1–0 against Manchester City in the final in Porto to win the Champions League for the second time in their history, and Mount's first trophy with the club.

==== 2021–22: Second Chelsea Player of the Year ====
On 11 August 2021, following a 1–1 draw after extra time in the 2021 UEFA Super Cup against Villarreal, Mount scored Chelsea's fourth penalty in the resulting shoot-out, which saw Chelsea triumph 6–5 for their second UEFA Super Cup title. On 8 October, Mount was one of five Chelsea players included in the final 30-man shortlist for the 2021 Ballon d'Or. The Ballon d'Or was won by Lionel Messi, and Mount would place 19th in the rankings. On 23 October, Mount scored his first goals of the season, and his first hat-trick for Chelsea, in a 7–0 home win over Norwich City.

In December, Mount became the youngest Chelsea player to score in four consecutive Premier League games, with a goal and assist in back-to-back trips to Watford and West Ham United, and then scoring at home against Leeds United and Everton. On 16 December, at 22 years and 340 days, Mount became the youngest Chelsea player to score 20 Premier League goals in the competition's history. As a result of his four goals and three assists during the December 2021 month, he was nominated for Premier League Player of the Month and his goal against West Ham was nominated for Premier League Goal of the Month, which were eventually won by Raheem Sterling and Alexandre Lacazette, respectively.

Mount scored in three consecutive matches for the first time in his Chelsea career in April, with two goals and an assist at Southampton in the Premier League, a goal and an assist in the away leg against Real Madrid in the quarter-finals of the Champions League, and a goal against Crystal Palace in the semi-finals of the FA Cup. He made his 100th Premier League appearance on 20 April 2022, marking the occasion with an assist, although this ended in a 4–2 home defeat against Arsenal.

On 11 May, Mount scored his 11th Premier League goal of the season and assisted Christian Pulisic to make it 2–0 against Leeds United, giving him double digits in both goals and assists and becoming only the fifth Chelsea player (as well as the youngest) to reach that landmark in a season. In the next game, however, Mount and César Azpilicueta would miss penalties in a penalty shootout against Liverpool in the FA Cup Final, as the Reds won 6–5 on penalties, on 14 May. Mount was named Chelsea's player of the season for a second consecutive season on 22 May, becoming the 12th player to win it more than once, and the first to win it twice in a row since Eden Hazard, who won it in 2014 and retained it in 2015.

==== 2022–23: Dip in form and departure ====
Mount had a difficult start to the new 2022–23 season, as he registered no goal contributions in the Blues' first seven games under Thomas Tuchel, despite featuring in each match. The day after a 1–0 defeat at Dinamo Zagreb in the Champions League, Tuchel was sacked. Graham Potter, who had previously managed at Brighton & Hove Albion, was announced as the new Chelsea head coach. Mount picked up two assists, for teammates Kai Havertz and Christian Pulisic, in a 3–0 home victory against Wolverhampton Wanderers on 8 October.

Later in October, in a 2–0 away win in the Champions League against AC Milan, Mount won a penalty, after being fouled by former Chelsea teammate Fikayo Tomori, which Jorginho scored. Mount later gained an assist for Pierre-Emerick Aubameyang's goal. He was also awarded man of the match for his performance. He scored his first goals of the season on 16 October, scoring both goals in a 2–0 victory at Aston Villa. On 27 December, in Chelsea's first match since the conclusion of the World Cup, Mount scored his first home goal in over a year against Bournemouth, in a 2–0 victory. On 27 April, Chelsea confirmed that Mount had undergone surgery for a pubic bone injury that had restricted his appearances during the second half of the 2022–23 season. On 4 July 2023, Mount confirmed through a social media video message his decision to leave Chelsea after 18 years at the club.

=== Manchester United ===
On 5 July 2023, Mount signed for Premier League club Manchester United on an initial five-year contract, with the option to extend for a further year. United paid Chelsea a guaranteed transfer fee of £55 million, with the deal containing potential add-ons of £5 million, and Mount took on the prestigious number seven jersey, which was last worn by Cristiano Ronaldo prior to his departure in the previous season. Erik ten Hag, his manager at United, said that Mount would be playing deeper and in the midfield unlike his time at Chelsea.

==== 2023–present: Struggle with injuries ====
Mount made his competitive debut for Manchester United in the team's opening game of the 2023–24 Premier League season – a 1–0 win over Wolverhampton Wanderers at Old Trafford on 15 August – playing 67 minutes before being substituted for Christian Eriksen. After sustaining an injury in a 2–0 loss to Tottenham Hotspur on 23 August, Mount was absent for Manchester United's following four matches. On 26 September, he returned from injury for a 3–0 win over Crystal Palace in the third round of the EFL Cup, playing 45 minutes and recording his first assist for the club. In a 1–0 win over Luton Town on 11 November, Mount was again substituted with an injury which led to him missing the next four months of the season.

On 17 March 2024, Mount returned to the Manchester United first team, playing 15 minutes as a substitute in a 4–3 FA Cup quarter-final win over arch-rivals Liverpool. In the following match, Mount scored his first goal for the club, scoring in the 96th minute in a 1–1 draw against Brentford on 30 March. On 20 December 2024, manager, Ruben Amorim, gave an injury update and said that Mount would be out for "several weeks". He had sustained a leg injury after playing the first 14 minutes during United's 2–1 victory over Manchester City on 15 December.

After three months out due to injury, Mount returned to Manchester United’s squad for the match against Leicester City on 16 March 2025, but did not play. He then came on as a substitute in the following match, when Manchester United lost 0–1 to Nottingham Forest. On 4 May, he scored his first goal in over a year in the match against Brentford, giving Manchester United the lead before they ultimately lost 3–4. Four days later, he scored twice in a 4–1 victory over Athletic Bilbao, helping his team secure a spot in the Europa League final, in which he started.

Mount scored his first goal of the 2025–26 Premier League season on 4 October 2025 in a 2–0 win over AFC Sunderland. On 30 November, he scored a free kick, which would turn out to be the winning goal against Crystal Palace in a 2–1 victory at Selhurst Park. It was the first time he had played a full 90 minutes in the Premier League since he had joined United. On 8 December, he scored his third goal of the season against Wolverhampton Wanderers in a 4–1 away win. On Boxing Day, in a win against Newcastle United, Mount was briefly injured again.

== International career ==
=== Youth ===
Mount played youth international football for England at under-16, under-17, under-18, under-19 and under-21 levels. Mount represented the under-17s at the 2016 UEFA European Under-17 Championship.

Mount was included in the under-19 team for the 2017 UEFA European Under-19 Championship. He provided the assist for Lukas Nmecha to score the winning goal against Portugal in the final. He was subsequently named Golden Player of the tournament. On 27 May 2019, Mount was included in England's 23-man squad for the 2019 UEFA European Under-21 Championship.

=== Senior ===
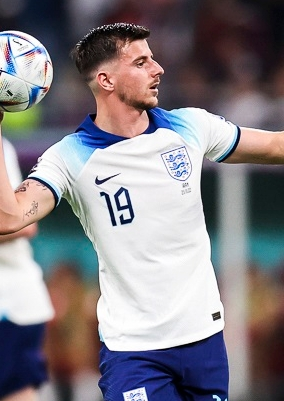
Mount playing for England at the 2022 FIFA World Cup

Following his impressive season with Vitesse, Mount was invited by manager Gareth Southgate to train with the senior team for a week ahead of the 2018 FIFA World Cup. He was called up to the senior team for the UEFA Nations League matches against Croatia and Spain in October 2018. Mount made his debut for the England senior team on 7 September 2019 as a 67th-minute substitute in England's 4–0 home win over Bulgaria in UEFA Euro 2020 qualifying. He scored his first goal for England on 17 November in a 4–0 away win against Kosovo in UEFA Euro 2020 qualifying.

==== UEFA Euro 2020 ====
Mount was named in the 26-man England squad for UEFA Euro 2020 and started the team's opening two matches against Croatia and Scotland. On 22 June 2021, Mount and fellow England player Ben Chilwell were forced to self-isolate after coming into contact with Scotland player Billy Gilmour, who tested positive for COVID-19 after the teams' 0–0 draw. Mount returned to the England line-up for their 4–0 win over Ukraine in the quarter-final, and also went on to start in the 2–1 semi-final defeat of Denmark and the UEFA Euro 2020 Final against Italy, which England lost on a penalty shootout after drawing 1–1.

==== 2022 FIFA World Cup ====
On 10 November 2022, Mount was included in the England squad for the 2022 FIFA World Cup by manager Gareth Southgate. He made his World Cup debut on 21 November, playing 71 minutes of England's 6–2 win in their first Group B fixture against Iran before being replaced by substitute Phil Foden. Five days later, he played the full 90 minutes in England's 0–0 draw with the United States but was criticised for his lack of impact on the match by several media outlets.

After being an unused substitute in England's final group match against Wales, Mount appeared as a 76th-minute substitute for Jude Bellingham in England's 3–0 round of 16 win over Senegal on 4 December.

In the quarter-final against France, Mount was substituted on for Jordan Henderson in the 79th minute with England trailing 2–1 and was fouled three minutes later by Theo Hernández, winning a penalty kick. However, captain Harry Kane failed to convert the kick and England were eliminated by the defending champions.

== Personal life ==
Mount has been a close friend of fellow England international Declan Rice since childhood. Mount supports Portsmouth, citing former Portsmouth players such as Peter Crouch, Jermain Defoe and Nwankwo Kanu as his footballing heroes whilst growing up. He attended Purbrook Park School. In 2021, Mount became a patron of the charity Together for Short Lives.

Mount and former Chelsea team-mate Billy Gilmour were the victims of a campaign of harassment by TikToker Orla Melissa Sloan between 2021 and 2023. Sloan was convicted of stalking the pair in June 2023, as well as of harassment against Ben Chilwell. She was given a suspended prison term.

== Career statistics ==
=== Club ===
As of match played 22 November 2026

Appearances and goals by club, season and competition
Club	Season	League			National cup (Note: Includes KNVB Cup, FA Cup)		League cup (Note: Includes EFL Cup)		Europe		Other		Total	
Club	Season	Division	Apps	Goals	Apps	Goals	Apps	Goals	Apps	Goals	Apps	Goals	Apps	Goals
Chelsea U23	2016–17	—	—		—		—		—		3 (Note: Appearances in EFL Trophy)	0	3	0
Vitesse Arnhem (loan)	2017–18	Eredivisie	29	9	1	0	—		6 (Note: Appearances in UEFA Europa League)	0	3 (Note: Appearances in Eredivisie European play-offs)	5	39	14
Derby County (loan)	2018–19	Championship	35	8	2	0	4	2	—		3 (Note: Appearances in Championship play-offs)	1	44	11
Chelsea	2019–20	Premier League	37	7	6	1	1	0	8 (Note: Appearances in UEFA Champions League)	0	1 (Note: Appearance in UEFA Super Cup)	0	53	8
Chelsea	2020–21	Premier League	36	6	5	1	2	0	11	2	—		54	9
Chelsea	2021–22	Premier League	32	11	5	1	6	0	7	1	3 (Note: One appearance in UEFA Super Cup, two appearances in FIFA Club World Cup)	0	53	13
Chelsea	2022–23	Premier League	24	3	1	0	1	0	9	0	—		35	3
Chelsea	Total		129	27	17	3	10	0	35	3	4	0	195	33
Manchester United	2023–24	Premier League	14	1	2	0	2	0	2	0	—		20	1
Manchester United	2024–25	Premier League	17	1	0	0	0	0	9	2	1 (Note: Appearance in FA Community Shield)	0	27	3
Manchester United	2025–26	Premier League	23	3	1	0	1	0	—		—		25	3
Manchester United	2026–27	Premier League	6	0	0	0	1	1	4	0	—		11	1
Manchester United	Total		60	5	3	0	4	1	15	2	1	0	83	8
Career total			253	49	23	3	18	3	56	5	14	6	364	66

=== International ===
As of match played 10 December 2022

Appearances and goals by national team and year
National team	Year	Apps	Goals
England	2019	6	1
England	2020	7	2
England	2021	13	1
England	2022	10	1
Total		36	5

As of match played 10 December 2022
England score listed first, score column indicates score after each Mount goal

List of international goals scored by Mason Mount
No.	Date	Venue	Cap	Opponent	Score	Result	Competition	Ref.
1	17 November 2019	Fadil Vokrri Stadium, Pristina, Kosovo	6	Kosovo	4–0	4–0	UEFA Euro 2020 qualifying	
2	11 October 2020	Wembley Stadium, London, England	9	Belgium	2–1	2–1	2020–21 UEFA Nations League A	
3	18 November 2020	Wembley Stadium, London, England	13	Iceland	2–0	4–0	2020–21 UEFA Nations League A	
4	28 March 2021	Arena Kombëtare, Tirana, Albania	15	Albania	2–0	2–0	2022 FIFA World Cup qualification	
5	26 September 2022	Wembley Stadium, London, England	32	Germany	2–2	3–3	2022–23 UEFA Nations League A	

== Honours ==
Chelsea Youth

- U18 Premier League: 2016–17
- FA Youth Cup: 2015–16, 2016–17
- UEFA Youth League: 2015–16

Chelsea

- UEFA Champions League: 2020–21
- UEFA Super Cup: 2021
- FIFA Club World Cup: 2021
- FA Cup runner-up: 2019–20, 2020–21, 2021–22
- EFL Cup runner-up: 2021–22

Manchester United

- FA Cup: 2023–24
- UEFA Europa League runner-up: 2024–25

England U19

- UEFA European Under-19 Championship: 2017

England

- UEFA European Championship runner-up: 2020

Individual

- Chelsea Academy Player of the Year: 2016–17
- UEFA European Under-19 Championship Team of the Tournament: 2017
- UEFA European Under-19 Championship Golden Player: 2017
- Eredivisie Talent of the Month: January 2018
- Vitesse Player of the Year: 2017–18
- Eredivisie Team of the Year: 2017–18
- Chelsea Player of the Season: 2020–21, 2021–22
- UEFA Champions League Squad of the Season: 2020–21
- Premier League Academy Graduate of the Year: 2020–21
