= 2021 UEFA Champions League final =

Football match in Porto, Portugal

- Match programme cover
- Event: 2020–21 UEFA Champions League
Manchester City	Chelsea
(England)	(England)
0	1
- Date: 29 May 2021
- Venue: Estádio do Dragão, Porto
- Man of the Match: N'Golo Kanté (Chelsea)
- Referee: Antonio Mateu Lahoz (Spain)
- Attendance: 14,110
- Weather: Clear night 19 °C (66 °F); 72% humidity

The 2021 UEFA Champions League final was the final match of the 2020–21 UEFA Champions League, the 66th season of Europe's premier club football tournament organised by UEFA, and the 29th season since it was renamed from the European Cup to the UEFA Champions League. It was played at the Estádio do Dragão in Porto, Portugal on 29 May 2021, between English clubs Manchester City, in their first European Cup final, and 2012 winners Chelsea. This was the third all-English final in the competition, after the 2008 and 2019 finals; and remains the most recent final in the competition in which two teams from the same association have met.

The final was originally scheduled to be played at the Krestovsky Stadium in Saint Petersburg, Russia. However, due to the postponement and relocation of the 2020 final to Lisbon as a result of the COVID-19 pandemic in Europe, the final hosts were shifted back a year, with the Atatürk Olympic Stadium in Istanbul, Turkey instead planning to host the 2021 final. Two weeks before the final, UEFA announced that it would be relocated to Porto to allow a limited number of fans to attend the match. A capacity limit of 33% was agreed for the 50,000-seater Estádio do Dragão, resulting in an attendance of 14,110. This was the second consecutive final in Portugal.

Chelsea won the final 1–0 for their second UEFA Champions League title, with Kai Havertz scoring the only goal of the game late in the first half. As winners, they earned the right to play against the winners of the 2020–21 UEFA Europa League, Villarreal, in the 2021 UEFA Super Cup, and also qualified for the 2021 FIFA Club World Cup, both of which they won. Chelsea also qualified for the 2025 FIFA Club World Cup, which they also won, through UEFA's champions pathway (the winners of the Champions League between 2021 and 2024).

== Venue ==
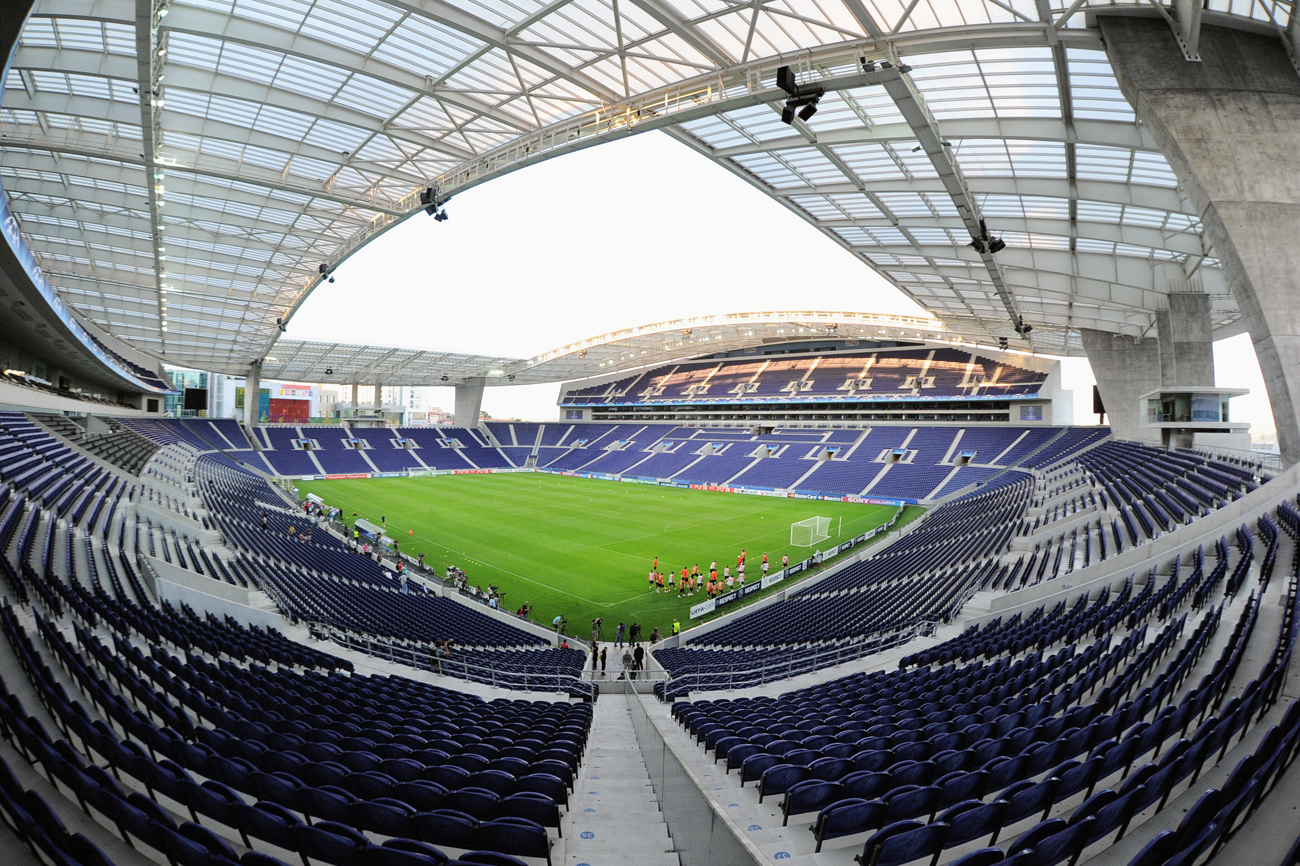
The Estádio do Dragão in Porto hosted the final.

The match was the fourth European Cup/Champions League final to take place in Portugal, and the first to take place outside Lisbon, which previously hosted finals in 1967 at the Estádio Nacional and in 2014 and 2020 at the Estádio da Luz. This was the first time the European Cup/Champions League final took place in the same country in successive seasons. The Estádio do Dragão previously hosted matches at UEFA Euro 2004 and the 2019 UEFA Nations League Finals. Additionally, this final was the first since 2004 to be held in a stadium with capacity lower than 60,000.

=== Initial host selection ===
An open bidding process was launched on 22 September 2017 by UEFA to select the venues of the finals of the UEFA Champions League, UEFA Europa League, and UEFA Women's Champions League in 2020. Associations had until 31 October 2017 to express interest, and bid dossiers must be submitted by 1 March 2018. Associations hosting matches at UEFA Euro 2020 were not allowed to bid for the 2020 UEFA Champions League final.

UEFA announced on 3 November 2017 that two associations had expressed interest in hosting the 2020 UEFA Champions League final.

Bidding associations for final
Association	Stadium	City	Capacity
Portugal	Estádio da Luz	Lisbon	65,647
Turkey	Atatürk Olympic Stadium	Istanbul	76,092

The Atatürk Olympic Stadium was selected by the UEFA Executive Committee during their meeting in Kyiv on 24 May 2018.

On 17 June 2020, the UEFA Executive Committee announced that due to the postponement and relocation of the 2020 final to the Estádio da Luz, Istanbul would instead host the 2021 final.

=== Relocation to Porto ===
Due to the COVID-19 pandemic in Turkey, Premier League side Aston Villa offered to have Villa Park in Birmingham as the venue for the Champions League final instead of Istanbul to hold 8,000 English fans, which could be affected by travel limitations. Villa Park has previously hosted the 1999 Cup Winners' Cup Final, the last final of that UEFA competition. It also hosted the 2012 FA Community Shield, also contested between Manchester City and Chelsea, due to Wembley Stadium – England's national stadium – hosting the Olympic football tournament finals in the previous days, being picked in part because of its equidistance between Manchester and London. On 7 May 2021, Secretary of State for Transport Grant Shapps advised against any fans travelling to Turkey for the game.

In negotiations with the Department for Digital, Culture, Media and Sport, UEFA would only consider Wembley as a potential venue within the United Kingdom, and required guarantees that their officials, sponsors and journalists would be exempt from the UK COVID-19 travel restrictions. The British Government was unable to agree to this, and on 13 May 2021, UEFA announced the final was relocated to the Estádio do Dragão in Porto, Portugal, a country that was on the British "green list" for unrestricted travel during the pandemic.

== Background ==
Manchester City were playing in their first European Cup/UEFA Champions League final. They had previously played in one European final, the 1970 European Cup Winners' Cup final, which they won. They became the ninth distinct English side to play in a European Cup/UEFA Champions League final. This was the third UEFA Champions League final for manager Pep Guardiola, and his first since the two wins with Barcelona in 2009 and 2011, both against Manchester United. City were seeking to become the first club to win its first European Cup/UEFA Champions League title since Chelsea in 2012, with three clubs having failed to do in between.

Chelsea were playing in their third European Cup/UEFA Champions League final, and the first since their win in 2012 away against Bayern Munich. In addition, they had previously played in the UEFA Cup Winners' Cup and UEFA Europa League finals twice each – winning all (the Cup Winners' Cup in 1971 and 1998, the Europa League in 2013 and 2019). In addition, Chelsea became the first club ever to see its men's and women's teams reach the Champions League final in the same season, having qualified for the 2021 UEFA Women's Champions League final as well. Head coach Thomas Tuchel became the first manager to reach the European Cup/UEFA Champions League final in successive seasons with different clubs, having lost the 2020 final to Bayern Munich while coaching Paris Saint-Germain.

This was the third all-English final in the history of the competition, after 2008 in Moscow between Chelsea and Manchester United and 2019 in Madrid between Liverpool and Tottenham Hotspur. This was also the third consecutive Champions League final to feature a first-time finalist, after Tottenham in 2019 and Paris Saint-Germain in 2020.

This was the third meeting between the teams in Europe, having previously met in the semi-finals of the 1970–71 European Cup Winners' Cup, where Chelsea won both legs 1–0 en route to their first European trophy. It was also the second major cup final between them, after the 2019 EFL Cup final, which City won on penalties following a goalless draw after extra time. The teams also met in two other title-deciding matches, the 2012 and 2018 FA Community Shields, both ended in City's favor. They had met twice during the season's Premier League, with each side winning away: City won the first match 3–1 at Stamford Bridge, while Chelsea won the second 2–1 at Etihad Stadium three weeks before the final. Three weeks before the second league encounter, Chelsea also beat City 1–0 in the FA Cup semi-finals, denying City the chance of winning an unprecedented quadruple.

=== Previous finals ===
In the following table, finals until 1992 were in the European Cup era, since 1993 were in the UEFA Champions League era.

Team	Previous final appearances (bold indicates winners)
(England) Manchester City	None
(England) Chelsea	2 (2008, **2012**)

== Route to the final ==
Note: In all results below, the score of the finalist is given first (H: home; A: away).

(England) Manchester City				Round	(England) Chelsea			
Opponent	Result			Group stage	Opponent	Result		
(Portugal) Porto	3–1 (H)			Matchday 1	(Spain) Sevilla	0–0 (H)		
(France) Marseille	3–0 (A)			Matchday 2	(Russia) Krasnodar	4–0 (A)		
(Greece) Olympiacos	3–0 (H)			Matchday 3	(France) Rennes	3–0 (H)		
(Greece) Olympiacos	1–0 (A)			Matchday 4	(France) Rennes	2–1 (A)		
(Portugal) Porto	0–0 (A)			Matchday 5	(Spain) Sevilla	4–0 (A)		
(France) Marseille	3–0 (H)			Matchday 6	(Russia) Krasnodar	1–1 (H)		
Group C winners: Pos / Team / Pld / Pts; 1 / (England) Manchester City / 6 / 16; 2 / (Portugal) Porto / 6 / 13; 3 / (Greece) Olympiacos / 6 / 3; 4 / (France) Marseille / 6 / 3; Source: UEFA				Final standings	Group E winners: Pos / Team / Pld / Pts; 1 / (England) Chelsea / 6 / 14; 2 / (Spain) Sevilla / 6 / 13; 3 / (Russia) Krasnodar / 6 / 5; 4 / (France) Rennes / 6 / 1; Source: UEFA			
Opponent	Agg.	1st leg	2nd leg	Knockout phase	Opponent	Agg.	1st leg	2nd leg
(Germany) Borussia Mönchengladbach	4–0	2–0 (A) (Note: Both legs of Manchester City's round of 16 tie against Borussia Mönchengladbach were played in Budapest, Hungary due to travel restrictions related to the COVID-19 pandemic between Germany and the United Kingdom.)	2–0 (H)	Round of 16	(Spain) Atlético Madrid	3–0	1–0 (A) (Note: The first leg away of Chelsea's round of 16 tie against Atlético Madrid was played in Bucharest, Romania due to travel restrictions related to the COVID-19 pandemic from the United Kingdom to Spain.)	2–0 (H)
(Germany) Borussia Dortmund	4–2	2–1 (H)	2–1 (A)	Quarter-finals	(Portugal) Porto	2–1	2–0 (A) (Note: Both legs of Chelsea's quarter-final tie against Porto were played in Seville, Spain due to travel restrictions related to the COVID-19 pandemic between Portugal and the United Kingdom.)	0–1 (H)
(France) Paris Saint-Germain	4–1	2–1 (A)	2–0 (H)	Semi-finals	(Spain) Real Madrid	3–1	1–1 (A)	2–0 (H)

== Pre-match ==
=== Officials ===
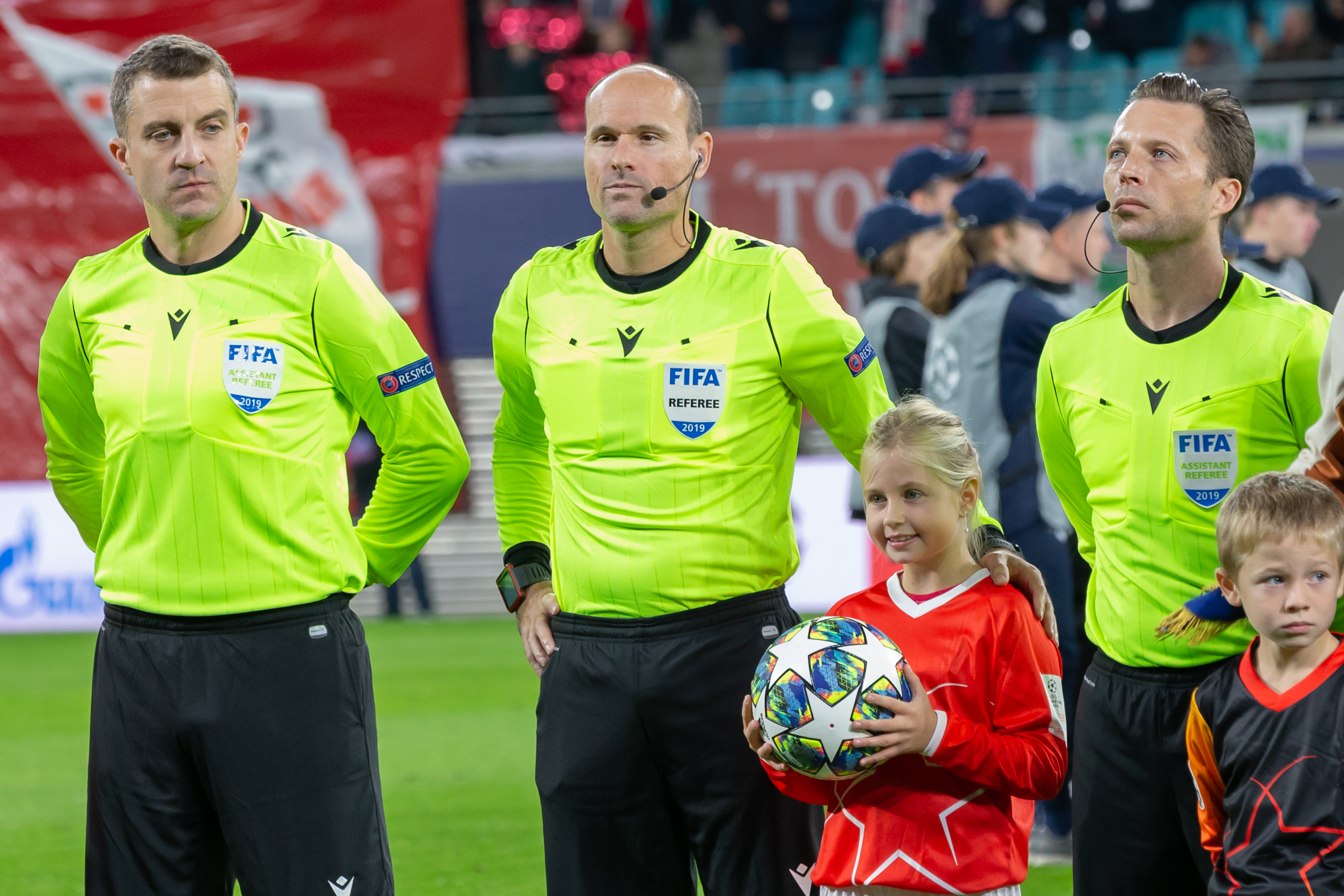
Spaniard Antonio Mateu Lahoz (centre) officiated the final along with assistants Roberto Díaz Pérez del Palomar (left) and Pau Cebrián Devís (right).

On 12 May 2021, UEFA named Spaniard Antonio Mateu Lahoz as the referee for the final. Mateu Lahoz had been a FIFA referee since 2011, and was previously the fourth official in the 2019 UEFA Champions League final. He officiated six prior matches in the 2020–21 Champions League season, with one match in the play-off round, four in the group stage and one quarter-final leg. He served as a referee at the 2018 FIFA World Cup in Russia, and was selected as an official for UEFA Euro 2020. He was joined by six of his fellow countrymen, including assistant referees Pau Cebrián Devís and Roberto Díaz Pérez del Palomar. Carlos del Cerro Grande served as the fourth official, while Alejandro Hernández Hernández acted as the video assistant referee. Juan Martínez Munuera and Íñigo Prieto López de Cerain were appointed as assistant VAR officials, along with Polish referee Paweł Gil.

=== Opening ceremony ===
American DJ and electronic music producer Marshmello performed a virtual show for the opening ceremony before the match, along with Selena Gomez and Khalid.

Marshmello's setlist
1. "Alone"
2. "Friends"
3. "Happier"
4. "Wolves" (with Selena Gomez)
5. "Silence" (with Khalid)

== Match ==
=== Summary ===
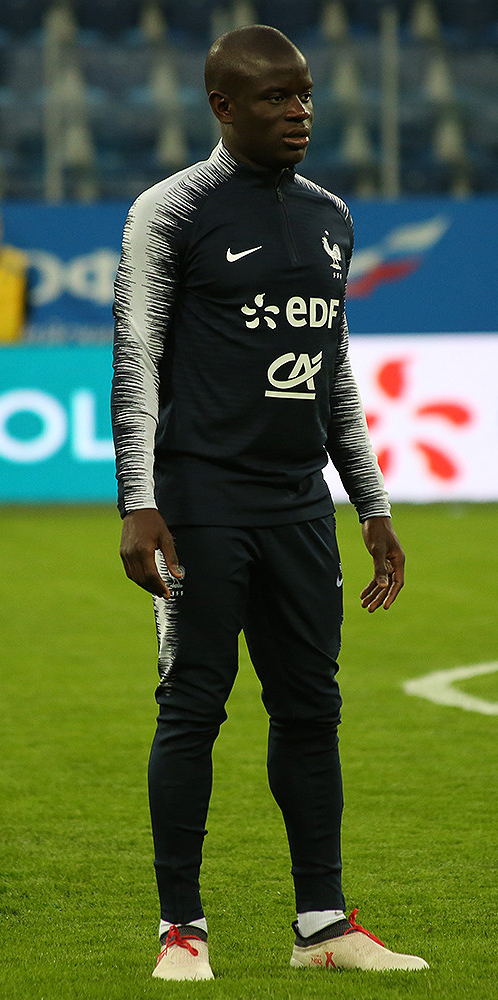
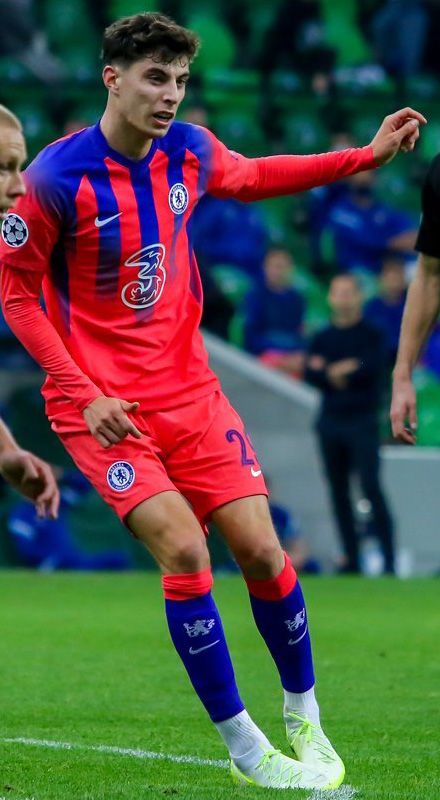
Chelsea midfielder N'Golo Kanté (left) was named man of the match, while fellow midfielder Kai Havertz (right) scored the only goal of the match.

The match kicked off around 8 p.m. in front of a crowd of 14,110. In the fourth minute, Kai Havertz played the ball across the Manchester City penalty area but it was gathered by Ederson. Five minutes later, a long kick from Ederson found Sterling, who controlled the ball and was about to shoot when he was dispossessed by Reece James. Havertz then passed to Werner, who missed the ball from close range when attempting to shoot. In the 15th minute, Mason Mount passed to Werner, who shot straight at Ederson, before then seeing a subsequent strike tipped away for a corner. Ben Chilwell played in a cross to the far post but N'Golo Kante's header went over the Manchester City bar. In the 28th minute, Phil Foden was played in on goal and was about to shoot when Antonio Rüdiger tackled him. Two minutes later, Kyle Walker sent the ball across the Chelsea penalty area but it fizzed just out of Mahrez's reach. With ten minutes of the half remaining, İlkay Gündoğan became the first player to be booked after a foul on Mount.

In the 38th minute, Kante played the ball to Havertz, who was denied a shooting opportunity by a tackle from Oleksandr Zinchenko. A minute later, Chelsea were forced to make the first substitution of the match with the injured Thiago Silva being replaced by Andreas Christensen. Three minutes before half-time, Chelsea took the lead. Mount passed to Havertz, who went one-on-one with Ederson, and although the goalkeeper rushed out and deflected the ball away, Havertz passed it into an empty net to make it 1–0. There were three minutes of stoppage time.

Neither side made any line-up changes during the interval. Manchester City dominated the early stages of the second half. Twelve minutes into the half, Rüdiger was booked for a foul on City's Kevin De Bruyne, who was injured in the challenge, leaving the pitch due to the new concussion protocol, in tears, to be replaced by Gabriel Jesus. Two minutes later, Manchester City appealed for a penalty when the ball struck James on the arm in his own penalty area, but the VAR review decided against a foul, noting that the ball deflecting off James' chest first. In the 64th minute, Bernardo Silva was replaced by Fernandinho for Manchester City before Christian Pulisic came on for Werner for Chelsea.

With 21 minutes remaining, City pressed for an equaliser. Mahrez's cross to Gündoğan was cleared by César Azpilicueta. Four minutes later, Pulisic flicked the ball to Havertz, who passed it back to Pulisic, but his attempted shot rolled just past the City goalpost. In the 75th minute, Sterling passed to Jesus, but the ball was cleared by Chilwell. Manchester City made their third substitution when Sergio Agüero, the club's highest goalscorer of all time playing his last ever game, came on for Sterling. Mateo Kovačić was brought on for Chelsea to replace Mount in the 80th minute, and five minutes later, Agüero attempted to find Foden with a lofted cross to the far post, but the ball was easily caught by Édouard Mendy in the Chelsea goal. A minute later, Walker played a cross-field out-swinging pass that narrowly missed both Agüero and Foden.

Two minutes from the end of the match, Jesus was booked for a foul on Havertz before Christensen made a block to maintain his side's lead. At the end of regular time, the fourth official displayed that a minimum of seven minutes of stoppage would be played. In the final minute, Mahrez's half-volley from the edge of the Chelsea penalty area went just over the crossbar, and the match was brought to an end with Chelsea winning 1–0.

=== Details ===
A "home" team was determined, for "administrative purposes," through a special draw held on 19 March 2021, after the quarter-final and semi-final draws.

29 May 2021
20:00 UTC+1

Manchester City (England)	0–1	(England) Chelsea
	Report	Havertz 42'

Estádio do Dragão, Porto
Attendance: 14,110
Referee: Antonio Mateu Lahoz (Spain)

Manchester City	Chelsea

GK	31	(Brazil) Ederson
RB	2	(England) Kyle Walker
CB	5	(England) John Stones
CB	3	(Portugal) Rúben Dias
LB	11	(Ukraine) Oleksandr Zinchenko
CM	20	(Portugal) Bernardo Silva		(substituted off) 64'
CM	8	(Germany) İlkay Gündoğan	(yellow card) 35'
CM	47	(England) Phil Foden
AM	17	(Belgium) Kevin De Bruyne (c)		(substituted off) 60'
CF	26	(Algeria) Riyad Mahrez
CF	7	(England) Raheem Sterling		(substituted off) 77'
Substitutes:
GK	13	(United States) Zack Steffen
GK	33	(England) Scott Carson
DF	6	(Netherlands) Nathan Aké
DF	14	(Spain) Aymeric Laporte
DF	22	(France) Benjamin Mendy
DF	27	(Portugal) João Cancelo
DF	50	(Spain) Eric García
MF	16	(Spain) Rodri
MF	25	(Brazil) Fernandinho		(substituted on) 64'
FW	9	(Brazil) Gabriel Jesus	(yellow card) 88'	(substituted on) 60'
FW	10	(Argentina) Sergio Agüero		(substituted on) 77'
FW	21	(Spain) Ferran Torres
Manager:
(Spain) Pep Guardiola

GK	16	(Senegal) Édouard Mendy
CB	28	(Spain) César Azpilicueta (c)
CB	6	(Brazil) Thiago Silva		(substituted off) 39'
CB	2	(Germany) Antonio Rüdiger	(yellow card) 57'
RWB	24	(England) Reece James
LWB	21	(England) Ben Chilwell
CM	5	(Italy) Jorginho
CM	7	(France) N'Golo Kanté
AM	29	(Germany) Kai Havertz
AM	19	(England) Mason Mount		(substituted off) 80'
CF	11	(Germany) Timo Werner		(substituted off) 66'
Substitutes:
GK	1	(Spain) Kepa Arrizabalaga
GK	13	(Argentina) Willy Caballero
DF	3	(Spain) Marcos Alonso
DF	4	(Denmark) Andreas Christensen		(substituted on) 39'
DF	15	(France) Kurt Zouma
DF	33	(Italy) Emerson Palmieri
MF	10	(United States) Christian Pulisic		(substituted on) 66'
MF	17	(Croatia) Mateo Kovačić		(substituted on) 80'
MF	20	(England) Callum Hudson-Odoi
MF	22	(Morocco) Hakim Ziyech
MF	23	(Scotland) Billy Gilmour
FW	18	(France) Olivier Giroud
Manager:
(Germany) Thomas Tuchel

Man of the Match:
N'Golo Kanté (Chelsea)

Assistant referees:
Pau Cebrián Devís (Spain)
Roberto Díaz Pérez del Palomar (Spain)
Fourth official:
Carlos del Cerro Grande (Spain)
Video assistant referee:
Alejandro Hernández Hernández (Spain)
Assistant video assistant referees:
Juan Martínez Munuera (Spain)
Íñigo Prieto López de Cerain (Spain)
Paweł Gil (Poland)

Match rules

- 90 minutes
- 30 minutes of extra time if necessary
- Penalty shoot-out if scores still level
- Twelve named substitutes
- Maximum of five substitutions, with a sixth allowed in extra time (Note: Each team was given only three opportunities to make substitutions, with a fourth opportunity in extra time, excluding substitutions made at half-time, before the start of extra time and at half-time in extra time.)

=== Statistics ===
First half
Statistic	Manchester City	Chelsea
Goals scored	0	1
Total shots	3	5
Shots on target	1	2
Saves	1	1
Ball possession	53%	47%
Corner kicks	1	1
Fouls committed	7	6
Offsides	1	2
Yellow cards	1	0
Red cards	0	0

Second half
Statistic	Manchester City	Chelsea
Goals scored	0	0
Total shots	4	3
Shots on target	0	0
Saves	0	0
Ball possession	64%	36%
Corner kicks	2	0
Fouls committed	7	7
Offsides	0	1
Yellow cards	1	1
Red cards	0	0

Overall
Statistic	Manchester City	Chelsea
Goals scored	0	1
Total shots	7	8
Shots on target	1	2
Saves	1	1
Ball possession	58%	42%
Corner kicks	3	1
Fouls committed	14	13
Offsides	1	3
Yellow cards	2	1
Red cards	0	0

== See also ==
- 2021 UEFA Europa League final
- 2021 UEFA Women's Champions League final
- 2020–21 Chelsea F.C. season
- 2020–21 Manchester City F.C. season
- Chelsea F.C. in international football
- English football clubs in international competitions
- List of football matches between British clubs in UEFA competitions
- Manchester City F.C. in international football
