= Aleksi Heino =

Finnish footballer (born 2004)

Personal information
- Date of birth: 25 July 2004 (age 22)
- Place of birth: Turku, Finland
- Height: 1.85 m (6 ft 1 in)
- Position: Forward

Youth career
- Turun Nappulaliiga
- TPS
- Inter Turku
- 2020–2021: Chelsea
- 2021–2022: VfL Wolfsburg
- 2022: SJK

Senior career*
Years	Team	Apps	(Gls)
2022–2023	SJK Akatemia	6	(1)

International career^{‡}
2019	Finland U15	3	(2)
2022	Finland U18	1	(0)
- * Club domestic league appearances and goals as of 1 September 2026 ‡ National team caps and goals as of 28 December 2022

Aleksi Heino (born 25 July 2004) is a Finnish professional footballer currently playing as a forward.

== Club career ==
Born in Turku, Heino began his career in the youth team of Turun Nappulaliiga, later continued in the academies of TPS and Inter Turku, before trialling with German side VfL Wolfsburg and English side Chelsea in 2020. He signed with the latter in September of the same year.

After a season with Chelsea, in which he only appeared once for the under-18 side, he moved to Germany to join VfL Wolfsburg. However, he also failed to settle in Germany, again notching only one appearance for Wolfsburg's youth side, before a return to Finland with SJK in August 2022.

He scored his first goal for SJK's reserve team, SJK Akatemia, in a 4–3 loss to PK-35 in the 2022 Ykkönen relegation group.

== International career ==
Heino has represented Finland at under-15 and under-18 level.

== Career statistics ==
=== Club ===
As of match played 1 September 2026

Appearances and goals by club, season and competition
Club	Season	League			National Cup		League Cup		Other		Total	
Club	Season	Division	Apps	Goals	Apps	Goals	Apps	Goals	Apps	Goals	Apps	Goals
SJK Akatemia	2022	Ykkönen	2	1	0	0	0	0	0	0	2	1
SJK Akatemia	2023	Ykkönen	4	0	1 (Note: Appearances in the Finnish Cup)	0	2 (Note: Appearances in the Ykkönen Cup)	0	0	0	7	0
Career total			6	1	1	0	2	0	0	0	9	1
