= 2020–21 in English football =

Football in England
- Season: 2020–21

Men's football
- Premier League: Manchester City
- Championship: Norwich City
- League One: Hull City
- League Two: Cheltenham Town
- National League: Sutton United
- FA Cup: Leicester City
- Community Shield: Arsenal
- EFL Cup: Manchester City
- EFL Trophy: Sunderland

Women's football
- FA Women's Super League: Chelsea
- FA Women's Championship: Leicester City
- FA Women's National League: not awarded
- Women's FA Cup: Chelsea
- FA Women's League Cup: Chelsea
- Community Shield: Chelsea

The 2020–21 season was the 141st season of competitive association football in England.

== National teams ==
=== England national football team ===
==== Results and fixtures ====
===== Friendlies =====
8 October 2020	England	3–0	Wales	London, England
19:45 BST	Calvert-Lewin 26'; Coady 53'; Ings 63'	Report		Stadium: Wembley Stadium; Attendance: 0 Referee: Bobby Madden (Scotland)

12 November 2020	England	3–0	Republic of Ireland	London, England
19:45 BST	Maguire 18'; Sancho 31'; Calvert-Lewin 56' (pen.)	Report		Stadium: Wembley Stadium; Attendance: 0 Referee: Carlos del Cerro Grande (Spain)

2 June 2021	England	1–0	Austria	Middlesbrough, England
20:00 BST	Saka 56'	Report		Stadium: Riverside Stadium; Referee: Lawrence Visser (Belgium)

6 June 2021	England	1–0	Romania	Middlesbrough, England
17:00 BST	Rashford 68' (pen.)	Report		Stadium: Riverside Stadium; Referee: Tiago Martins (Portugal)

===== UEFA Nations League =====
====== Group 2 ======
Pos	Team	Pld	W	D	L	GF	GA	GD	Pts	Qualification or relegation	(Belgium)	(Denmark)	(England)	(Iceland)
1	Belgium	6	5	0	1	16	6	+10	15	Qualification for Nations League Finals	—	4–2	2–0	5–1
2	Denmark	6	3	1	2	8	7	+1	10 (Note: Head-to-head points: Denmark 4, England 1.)		0–2	—	0–0	2–1
3	England	6	3	1	2	7	4	+3	10		2–1	0–1	—	4–0
4	Iceland (R)	6	0	0	6	3	17	−14	0	Relegation to League B	1–2	0–3	0–1	—

Source: UEFA
(R) Relegated
Notes:

5 September 2020	Iceland	0–1	England	Reykjavík, Iceland
19:45 BST		Report	Sterling 90+1' (pen.)	Stadium: Laugardalsvöllur; Attendance: 0 (Note: Due to the COVID-19 pandemic in Europe, all matches scheduled for September 2020 will be played behind closed doors.); Referee: Srđan Jovanović (Serbia)

8 September 2020	Denmark	0–0	England	Copenhagen, Denmark
19:45 BST		Report		Stadium: Parken; Attendance: 0 Referee: István Kovács (Romania)

11 2002 4	England	2–1	Belgium	London, England
19:45 BST	Rashford 39' (pen.); Mount 64'	Report	Lukaku 16' (pen.)	Stadium: Wembley Stadium; Referee: Tobias Stieler (Germany)

14 October 2020	England	0–1	Denmark	London, England
19:45 BST		Report	Eriksen 35' (pen.)	Stadium: Wembley Stadium; Referee: Jesús Gil Manzano (Spain)

15 November 2020	Belgium	2–0	England	Brussels, Belgium
19:45 BST	Tielemans 10'; Mertens 23'	Report		Stadium: King Baudouin Stadium; Referee: Danny Makkelie (Netherlands)

18 November 2020	England	4–0	Iceland	London, England
19:45 GMT	Rice 20'; Mount 24'; Foden 80', 84'	Report		Stadium: Wembley Stadium; Referee: Fábio Veríssimo (Portugal)

===== 2022 FIFA World Cup qualification =====
====== Group I ======
Pos	Team	Pld	W	D	L	GF	GA	GD	Pts	Qualification	England	Poland	Albania	Hungary	Andorra	San Marino
1	England	10	8	2	0	39	3	+36	26	Qualification for 2022 FIFA World Cup	—	2–1	5–0	1–1	4–0	5–0
2	Poland	10	6	2	2	30	11	+19	20	Advance to play-offs	1–1	—	4–1	1–2	3–0	5–0
3	Albania	10	6	0	4	12	12	0	18		0–2	0–1	—	1–0	1–0	5–0
4	Hungary	10	5	2	3	19	13	+6	17		0–4	3–3	0–1	—	2–1	4–0
5	Andorra	10	2	0	8	8	24	−16	6		0–5	1–4	0–1	1–4	—	2–0
6	San Marino	10	0	0	10	1	46	−45	0		0–10	1–7	0–2	0–3	0–3	—

Source: FIFA, UEFA
Rules for classification: Tiebreakers

25 March 2021	England	5–0	San Marino	London, England
19:45	Ward-Prowse 14'; Calvert-Lewin 21', 53'; Sterling 31'; Watkins 83'	Report		Stadium: Wembley Stadium; Referee: Kirill Levnikov (Russia)

28 March 2021	Albania	0–2	England	Tirana, Albania
18:00		Report	Kane 38'; Mount 63'	Stadium: Arena Kombëtare; Referee: Orel Grinfeld (Israel)

31 March 2021	England	2–1	Poland	London, England
19:45	Kane 19' (pen.); Maguire 85'	Report	Moder 58'	Stadium: Wembley Stadium; Referee: Björn Kuipers (Netherlands)

===== UEFA Euro 2020 =====
====== Group D ======
Pos	Team	Pld	W	D	L	GF	GA	GD	Pts	Qualification
1	England (H)	3	2	1	0	2	0	+2	7	Advance to knockout stage
2	Croatia	3	1	1	1	4	3	+1	4 (Note: Tied on head-to-head result (Croatia 1–1 Czech Republic) and overall goal difference (+1). Overall goals for was used as the tiebreaker.)	Advance to knockout stage
3	Czech Republic	3	1	1	1	3	2	+1	4	Advance to knockout stage
4	Scotland (H)	3	0	1	2	1	5	−4	1	

Source: UEFA
(H) Hosts
Notes:

13 June 2021	England	1–0	Croatia	London, England
14:00	Sterling 57'	Report		Stadium: Wembley Stadium; Attendance: 18,497; Referee: Daniele Orsato (Italy)

18 June 2021	England	0–0	Scotland	London, England
20:00		Report		Stadium: Wembley Stadium; Attendance: 20,306; Referee: Antonio Mateu Lahoz (Spain)

22 June 2021	Czech Republic	0–1	England	London, England
20:00		Report	Sterling 12'	Stadium: Wembley Stadium; Attendance: 19,104; Referee: Artur Soares Dias (Portugal)

====== Knockout phase ======
29 June 2021 R16	England	2–0	Germany	London, England
17:00	Sterling 75'; Kane 86'	Report		Stadium: Wembley Stadium; Attendance: 41,973; Referee: Danny Makkelie (Netherlands)

3 July QF	Ukraine	0–4	England	Rome, Italy
21:00 CEST		Report	Kane 4', 50'; Maguire 46'; J. Henderson 63'	Stadium: Stadio Olimpico; Attendance: 11,880; Referee: Felix Brych (Germany)

7 July SF	England	2–1 (a.e.t.)	Denmark	London, England
20:00 BST	Kjær 39' (o.g.); Kane 104'	Report	Damsgaard 30'	Stadium: Wembley Stadium; Attendance: 64,950; Referee: Danny Makkelie (Netherlands)

11 July Final	Italy	1–1 (a.e.t.) (3–2 p)	England	London, England
20:00 BST	Bonucci 67'	Report	Shaw 2'	Stadium: Wembley Stadium; Attendance: 67,173; Referee: Björn Kuipers (Netherlands)
	Penalties
	Berardi (penalty scored); Belotti (penalty missed); Bonucci (penalty scored); Bernardeschi (penalty scored); Jorginho (penalty missed)		(penalty scored) Kane; (penalty scored) Maguire; (penalty missed) Rashford; (penalty missed) Sancho; (penalty missed) Saka

=== England women's national football team ===
==== Results and fixtures ====
===== Friendlies =====
27 October 2020	Germany	C-C	England	Wiesbaden, Germany
16:00 (16:00 UTC+1)				Stadium: Brita-Arena

1 December 2020	England	C-C (Note: Cancelled due to COVID-19 travel restrictions in Norway.)	Norway	Sheffield, England
19:15				Stadium: Bramall Lane

23 February 2021	England	6–0	Northern Ireland	Burton upon Trent, England
12:30	White 18', 23', 49'; Bronze 29'; Daly 67'; Toone 75' (pen.)	Report		Stadium: St George's Park; Attendance: Behind-closed-doors; Referee: Lorraine Watson (Scotland)

9 April 2021	France	3–1	England	Caen, France
21:10 CET (UTC+1)	Baltimore 32'; Asseyi 63' (pen.); Katoto 82'	Report	Kirby 79' (pen.)	Stadium: Stade Michel d'Ornano; Referee: Sara Persson (Sweden)

13 April 2021	England	0–2	Canada	Stoke-on-Trent, England
19:15			Viens 3'; Prince 86'	Stadium: Bet365 Stadium; Referee: Cheryl Foster (Wales)

== UEFA competitions ==
=== UEFA Champions League ===
==== Group stage ====
===== Group C =====
Pos	Team	Pld	W	D	L	GF	GA	GD	Pts	Qualification	MCI	POR	OLY	MAR
1	(England) Manchester City	6	5	1	0	13	1	+12	16	Advance to knockout phase	—	3–1	3–0	3–0
2	(Portugal) Porto	6	4	1	1	10	3	+7	13	Advance to knockout phase	0–0	—	2–0	3–0
3	(Greece) Olympiacos	6	1	0	5	2	10	−8	3 (Note: Tied on head-to-head points (3). Head-to-head away goals: Olympiacos 1, Marseille 0.)	Transfer to Europa League	0–1	0–2	—	1–0
4	(France) Marseille	6	1	0	5	2	13	−11	3		0–3	0–2	2–1	—

Source: UEFA

===== Group D =====
Pos	Team	Pld	W	D	L	GF	GA	GD	Pts	Qualification	LIV	ATA	AJX	MID
1	(England) Liverpool	6	4	1	1	10	3	+7	13	Advance to knockout phase	—	0–2	1–0	2–0
2	(Italy) Atalanta	6	3	2	1	10	8	+2	11	Advance to knockout phase	0–5	—	2–2	1–1
3	(Netherlands) Ajax	6	2	1	3	7	7	0	7	Transfer to Europa League	0–1	0–1	—	3–1
4	(Denmark) Midtjylland	6	0	2	4	4	13	−9	2		1–1	0–4	1–2	—

Source: UEFA

===== Group E =====
Pos	Team	Pld	W	D	L	GF	GA	GD	Pts	Qualification	CHE	SEV	KRA	REN
1	(England) Chelsea	6	4	2	0	14	2	+12	14	Advance to knockout phase	—	0–0	1–1	3–0
2	(Spain) Sevilla	6	4	1	1	9	8	+1	13	Advance to knockout phase	0–4	—	3–2	1–0
3	(Russia) Krasnodar	6	1	2	3	6	11	−5	5	Transfer to Europa League	0–4	1–2	—	1–0
4	(France) Rennes	6	0	1	5	3	11	−8	1		1–2	1–3	1–1	—

Source: UEFA

===== Group H =====
Pos	Team	Pld	W	D	L	GF	GA	GD	Pts	Qualification	PAR	RBL	MUN	IBS
1	(France) Paris Saint-Germain	6	4	0	2	13	6	+7	12 (Note: Tied on head-to-head points (3). Head-to-head away goals: Paris Saint-Germain 1, RB Leipzig 0.)	Advance to knockout phase	—	1–0	1–2	5–1
2	(Germany) RB Leipzig	6	4	0	2	11	12	−1	12	Advance to knockout phase	2–1	—	3–2	2–0
3	(England) Manchester United	6	3	0	3	15	10	+5	9	Transfer to Europa League	1–3	5–0	—	4–1
4	(Turkey) İstanbul Başakşehir	6	1	0	5	7	18	−11	3		0–2	3–4	2–1	—

Source: UEFA

==== Knockout phase ====
===== Round of 16 =====
Team 1	Agg.	Team 2	1st leg	2nd leg
Borussia Mönchengladbach (Germany)	0–4	(England) Manchester City	0–2	0–2
Atlético Madrid (Spain)	0–3	(England) Chelsea	0–1	0–2
RB Leipzig (Germany)	0–4	(England) Liverpool	0–2	0–2

===== Quarter-finals =====
Team 1	Agg.	Team 2	1st leg	2nd leg
Manchester City (England)	4–2	(Germany) Borussia Dortmund	2–1	2–1
Porto (Portugal)	1–2	(England) Chelsea	0–2	1–0
Real Madrid (Spain)	3–1	(England) Liverpool	3–1	0–0

===== Semi-finals =====
Team 1	Agg.	Team 2	1st leg	2nd leg
Paris Saint-Germain (France)	1–4	(England) Manchester City	1–2	0–2
Real Madrid (Spain)	1–3	(England) Chelsea	1–1	0–2

===== Final =====
29 May 2021
20:00 UTC+1

Manchester City (England)	0–1	(England) Chelsea
	Report	Havertz 42'

Estádio do Dragão, Porto
Attendance: 14,110
Referee: Antonio Mateu Lahoz (Spain)

=== UEFA Europa League ===
==== UEFA Europa League qualifying phase and play-off round ====
===== Second qualifying round =====
Team 1	Score	Team 2
Lokomotiv Plovdiv (Bulgaria)	1–2	(England) Tottenham Hotspur

===== Third qualifying round =====
Team 1	Score	Team 2
Shkëndija (North Macedonia)	1–3	(England) Tottenham Hotspur

===== Play-off round =====
Team 1	Score	Team 2
Tottenham Hotspur (England)	7–2	(Israel) Maccabi Haifa

==== Group stage ====
===== Group B =====
Pos	Team	Pld	W	D	L	GF	GA	GD	Pts	Qualification	ARS	MOL	RW	DUN
1	(England) Arsenal	6	6	0	0	20	5	+15	18	Advance to knockout phase	—	4–1	4–1	3–0
2	(Norway) Molde	6	3	1	2	9	11	−2	10	Advance to knockout phase	0–3	—	1–0	3–1
3	(Austria) Rapid Wien	6	2	1	3	11	13	−2	7		1–2	2–2	—	4–3
4	(Republic of Ireland) Dundalk	6	0	0	6	8	19	−11	0		2–4	1–2	1–3	—

Source: UEFA

===== Group G =====
Pos	Team	Pld	W	D	L	GF	GA	GD	Pts	Qualification	LEI	BRA	ZOR	AEK
1	(England) Leicester City	6	4	1	1	14	5	+9	13 (Note: Head-to-head points: Leicester City 4, Braga 1.)	Advance to knockout phase	—	4–0	3–0	2–0
2	(Portugal) Braga	6	4	1	1	14	10	+4	13	Advance to knockout phase	3–3	—	2–0	3–0
3	(Ukraine) Zorya Luhansk	6	2	0	4	6	11	−5	6		1–0	1–2	—	1–4
4	(Greece) AEK Athens	6	1	0	5	7	15	−8	3		1–2	2–4	0–3	—

Source: UEFA

===== Group J =====
Pos	Team	Pld	W	D	L	GF	GA	GD	Pts	Qualification	TOT	ANT	LASK	LUD
1	(England) Tottenham Hotspur	6	4	1	1	15	5	+10	13	Advance to knockout phase	—	2–0	3–0	4–0
2	(Belgium) Antwerp	6	4	0	2	8	5	+3	12	Advance to knockout phase	1–0	—	0–1	3–1
3	(Austria) LASK	6	3	1	2	11	12	−1	10		3–3	0–2	—	4–3
4	(Bulgaria) Ludogorets Razgrad	6	0	0	6	7	19	−12	0		1–3	1–2	1–3	—

Source: UEFA

==== Knockout phase ====
===== Round of 32 =====
Team 1	Agg.	Team 2	1st leg	2nd leg
Wolfsberger AC (Austria)	1–8	(England) Tottenham Hotspur	1–4	0–4
Real Sociedad (Spain)	0–4	(England) Manchester United	0–4	0–0
Benfica (Portugal)	3–4	(England) Arsenal	1–1	2–3
Slavia Prague (Czech Republic)	2–0	(England) Leicester City	0–0	2–0

===== Round of 16 =====
Team 1	Agg.	Team 2	1st leg	2nd leg
Olympiacos (Greece)	2–3	(England) Arsenal	1–3	1–0
Tottenham Hotspur (England)	2–3 (Note: Order of legs between Tottenham Hotspur and Dinamo Zagreb were reversed after original draw, in order to avoid a scheduling conflict with the Arsenal v Olympiacos second leg in the same city on 18 March, as Arsenal were the domestic cup winners and given higher priority over Tottenham Hotspur.)	(Croatia) Dinamo Zagreb	2–0	0–3 (a.e.t.)
Manchester United (England)	2–1	(Italy) Milan	1–1	1–0

===== Quarter-finals =====
Team 1	Agg.	Team 2	1st leg	2nd leg
Granada (Spain)	0–4	(England) Manchester United	0–2	0–2
Arsenal (England)	5–1	(Czech Republic) Slavia Prague	1–1	4–0

===== Semi-finals =====
Team 1	Agg.	Team 2	1st leg	2nd leg
Manchester United (England)	8–5	(Italy) Roma	6–2	2–3
Villarreal (Spain)	2–1	(England) Arsenal	2–1	0–0

===== Final =====
26 May 2021
21:00 UTC+2

Villarreal (Spain)	1–1 (a.e.t.)	(England) Manchester United
Gerard 29'	Report	Cavani 55'
Penalties
Gerard (penalty scored); Raba (penalty scored); Alcácer (penalty scored); Moreno (penalty scored); Parejo (penalty scored); Gómez (penalty scored); Albiol (penalty scored); Coquelin (penalty scored); Gaspar (penalty scored); Torres (penalty scored); Rulli (penalty scored)	11–10	(penalty scored) Mata; (penalty scored) Telles; (penalty scored) Fernandes; (penalty scored) Rashford; (penalty scored) Cavani; (penalty scored) Fred; (penalty scored) James; (penalty scored) Shaw; (penalty scored) Tuanzebe; (penalty scored) Lindelöf; (penalty missed) De Gea

Stadion Gdańsk, Gdańsk
Attendance: 9,412
Referee: Clément Turpin (France)

=== UEFA Youth League ===
On 17 February 2021, the UEFA Executive Committee cancelled the tournament.

==== UEFA Champions League Path ====
Team 1	Score	Team 2
Olympiacos (Greece)	3 Mar	(England) Manchester City
Manchester United (England)	2 Mar	(Spain) Real Madrid
Chelsea (England)	3 Mar	(Austria) Red Bull Salzburg
Liverpool (England)	2 Mar	(France) Marseille

=== UEFA Women's Champions League ===
==== Knockout phase ====
===== Round of 32 =====
Team 1	Agg.	Team 2	1st leg	2nd leg
Kopparbergs/Göteborg (Sweden)	1–5	(England) Manchester City	1–2	0–3
Benfica (Portugal)	0–8	(England) Chelsea	0–5	0–3

===== Round of 16 =====
Team 1	Agg.	Team 2	1st leg	2nd leg
Manchester City (England)	8–0	(Italy) Fiorentina	3–0	5–0
Chelsea (England)	3–1	(Spain) Atlético Madrid	2–0	1–1

===== Quarter-finals =====
Team 1	Agg.	Team 2	1st leg	2nd leg
Barcelona (Spain)	4–2	(England) Manchester City	3–0	1–2
Chelsea (England)	5–1	(Germany) VfL Wolfsburg	2–1	3–0

===== Semi-finals =====
Team 1	Agg.	Team 2	1st leg	2nd leg
Bayern Munich (Germany)	3–5	(England) Chelsea	2–1	1–4

===== Final =====
16 May 2021
21:00 UTC+2

Chelsea (England)	0–4	(Spain) Barcelona
	Report	Leupolz 1' (o.g.); Putellas 14' (pen.); Bonmatí 21'; Hansen 36'

Gamla Ullevi, Gothenburg
Attendance: 0 (Note: The final was played behind closed doors due to the COVID-19 pandemic in Sweden.)
Referee: Riem Hussein (Germany)

== Men's football ==
League Division	Promoted to league ▲	Relegated from league ▼	Expelled or Dissolved	Re-elected
Premier League	Leeds United ▲; West Bromwich Albion ▲; Fulham ▲	Norwich City ▼; Bournemouth ▼; Watford ▼	None	None
Championship	Coventry City ▲; Rotherham United ▲; Wycombe Wanderers ▲	Charlton Athletic ▼; Wigan Athletic ▼; Hull City ▼	None	None
League One	Swindon Town ▲; Crewe Alexandra ▲; Plymouth Argyle ▲; Northampton Town ▲	Bolton Wanderers ▼; Southend United ▼; Tranmere Rovers ▼	Bury	None
League Two	Barrow ▲; Harrogate Town ▲	Macclesfield Town ▼	None	Stevenage
National League	King's Lynn Town ▲; Wealdstone ▲; Altrincham ▲; Weymouth ▲	Chorley ▼; AFC Fylde ▼; Ebbsfleet United ▼	None	Maidenhead United

=== Premier League ===
In a season played almost entirely behind closed doors, because of COVID-19 restrictions, all matches were televised live in the UK for the first time. Manchester City overcame a shaky start to the campaign and secured their third Premier League title in four seasons – having stood in 13th place in late November, the team went on a 19-match unbeaten run (including a run of 15 consecutive wins) that sent them rocketing up the table and into first place, despite a succession of unexpected losses in the closing stages of the season, securing the title on top of a fourth consecutive League Cup victory and reaching their first ever Champions League final, losing in an all-English final to Chelsea. City rivals Manchester United finished not far behind them, despite not really being in the title race for much of the season, a consequence of a poor start which included three home losses in their opening six games (with further losses to Sheffield United, Leicester City and Liverpool at the turn of the year); however, the Red Devils at least ensured Champions League football once again, thanks in part to a remarkable run of form that saw them go unbeaten away from home all season.

The battle for the last two Champions League spots ended up going to the final day, with Chelsea, Leicester City and Liverpool battling it out – remarkably taking third spot were Liverpool, whose first title defence since 1990 ended up being one of struggle; whilst the Merseyside club stood top at the end of 2020, a complete collapse in form in the new year saw both the team's hopes of retaining the title as well as their 68-game unbeaten run at Anfield practically implode under the weight of both a lack of fans and an extensive injury crisis, including a season-ending injury to star defender Virgil van Dijk just five games into the campaign – however, a strong late run of form, coupled with the teams above them dropping points, helped the Reds to close the gap and squeeze into the top four. Chelsea finished fourth, a strong second half of the season under new manager Thomas Tuchel pushing the Blues from as low as ninth near the end of January to both securing a Champions League spot again and winning their first Champions League final since 2012 with victory over Manchester City, ending a mixed season (which included a second consecutive FA Cup final loss in a row) on a high. Having spent the most days in the top four for the season, another stuttering end to the league saw Leicester City finish fifth yet again and just barely miss out on the Champions League, with inferior home form compared to form on the road ultimately costing them; however, the Foxes at least finished the season with a trophy, winning their first ever FA Cup final and giving manager Brendan Rodgers his first piece of silverware with the club.

Finishing sixth were West Ham United, who surprised many in the season and went one further than their seventh-place finish in 2016 in manager David Moyes' first full campaign as Hammers boss, securing their biggest Premier League points total and a Europa League group spot for next year – the only blemish being an inconsistent run of form around Christmas, which cost what could have been potentially a shock top-four finish. North London rivals Arsenal and Tottenham Hotspur endured contrasting form across their campaigns; whilst Spurs briefly led the table just before Christmas; a dismal second half of the season though would see Spurs plummet down the table and ultimately culminate in Jose Mourinho being sacked in late April; under interim coach Ryan Mason, Spurs recovered to seventh and a place in the brand new Europa Conference League competition for the following season; Arsenal, who were hovering above the drop zone in December, finish eighth for the second successive campaign, but would be left without any European football next season for the first time in 26 years. Leeds United's first top-flight season since 2004 proved to be ultimately successful for the Yorkshire side, both the team and veteran Argentine manager Marcelo Bielsa attracting plenty of praise for their attacking football and providing some spectacular results even in defeat, the Peacocks comfortably securing 59 points, the highest for a promoted side since 2001.

Despite achieving some superb results, including taking four points off city rivals Liverpool in two controversial Merseyside derby games, Everton's hopes of European football were let down by a poor run of form on their home ground, securing just six wins compared to eleven on the road, ending their season in a disappointing tenth. In what ended up being Nuno Espírito Santo's last season as head coach, Wolverhampton Wanderers endured what ended up being a less successful campaign than their previous two, the loss of star striker Raúl Jiménez to a freak accident in a win at Arsenal contributed to the Black Country club falling down the table after a decent start and only avoiding a relegation scrap because of the poor form of the teams below them. In what also ended up being Roy Hodgson's final season as their manager, Crystal Palace also comfortably avoided the drop, extending their record run of top-flight seasons to nine in a row for the next campaign.

At the bottom of the table, all three relegated teams ended up occupying the spots with at least three games to go, and for the first time since the introduction of three points for a win in the top-flight, none of the relegated sides broke the 30-point barrier. Just one season after breaking into the top ten, Sheffield United endured one of the worst seasons in their history, breaking many unwanted records and equalling the record for the most losses in a Premier League season and the fewest goals scored in a 38-game season, though a series of wins in the second half of the campaign meant they ended up with a points total that, while still poor, was far from the worst in Premier League history. West Bromwich Albion finished above them, the controversial decision to sack manager Slaven Bilić in December in favour of Sam Allardyce going against the Baggies, the former England manager suffering only his second relegation in his managerial history (and his first since 1997), as they fell back into the Championship after a single season. Also returning to the second tier after one season was Fulham; despite enjoying a much better campaign defensively and securing some impressive wins, the London club's hopes were ultimately let down by a lack of goals (including just nine scored at Craven Cottage) and a high number of draws, making it the fourth season in a row where they moved between the Premier League and the Championship.

Pos	Team	Pld	W	D	L	GF	GA	GD	Pts	Qualification or relegation
1	Manchester City (C)	38	27	5	6	83	32	+51	86	Qualification for the Champions League group stage
2	Manchester United	38	21	11	6	73	44	+29	74	Qualification for the Champions League group stage
3	Liverpool	38	20	9	9	68	42	+26	69	Qualification for the Champions League group stage
4	Chelsea	38	19	10	9	58	36	+22	67	Qualification for the Champions League group stage
5	Leicester City	38	20	6	12	68	50	+18	66	Qualification for the Europa League group stage (Note: Since the winners of the 2020–21 FA Cup, Leicester City, also qualified for the Europa League based on league position, the second Europa League group stage berth allocated to England was transferred to the sixth-placed team.)
6	West Ham United	38	19	8	11	62	47	+15	65	Qualification for the Europa League group stage
7	Tottenham Hotspur	38	18	8	12	68	45	+23	62	Qualification for the Europa Conference League play-off round (Note: Since the winners of the 2020–21 EFL Cup, Manchester City, qualified for European competition based on league position, the Europa Conference League berth awarded to the EFL Cup winners was transferred to the highest-placed Premier League team not already qualified for European competition, the seventh-placed team.)
8	Arsenal	38	18	7	13	55	39	+16	61	
9	Leeds United	38	18	5	15	62	54	+8	59	
10	Everton	38	17	8	13	47	48	−1	59	
11	Aston Villa	38	16	7	15	55	46	+9	55	
12	Newcastle United	38	12	9	17	46	62	−16	45	
13	Wolverhampton Wanderers	38	12	9	17	36	52	−16	45	
14	Crystal Palace	38	12	8	18	41	66	−25	44	
15	Southampton	38	12	7	19	47	68	−21	43	
16	Brighton & Hove Albion	38	9	14	15	40	46	−6	41	
17	Burnley	38	10	9	19	33	55	−22	39	
18	Fulham (R)	38	5	13	20	27	53	−26	28	Relegation to EFL Championship
19	West Bromwich Albion (R)	38	5	11	22	35	76	−41	26	Relegation to EFL Championship
20	Sheffield United (R)	38	7	2	29	20	63	−43	23	Relegation to EFL Championship

Source: Premier League
Rules for classification: 1) Points; 2) Goal difference; 3) Goals scored; 4) If the champions, relegated teams or qualified teams for UEFA competitions cannot be determined by rules 1 to 3, rules 4.1 to 4.3 are applied – 4.1) Points gained in head-to-head record between such teams; 4.2) Away goals scored in head-to-head record between such teams; 4.3) Play-offs
(C) Champions; (R) Relegated

=== Championship ===
Having been relegated on a whimper the previous year, Norwich City responded in emphatic style, securing both an immediate return to the Premier League and their second Championship title in three campaigns – whilst ultimately finishing with a lower goal record compared to other seasons, despite Finnish striker Teemu Pukki recording another superb goal haul, the Canaries enjoyed a rare and much-improved season in defence. Finishing second were Watford, who overcame yet another mid-season managerial change (their sixth in just over a year) to join the Canaries in returning to the top-flight after one season, a superb run of form in 2021 earning Spanish head coach Xisco Munoz promotion on top of the Hornets also having their own impressive defence, conceding the least number of goals for any second-tier team since losing play-off finalists Preston North End in 2006. Taking the final spot through the playoffs by beating Swansea City - and ending a barren run of nine playoff campaigns across their history without success - were Brentford, who made amends for their narrow final loss the previous year and secured promotion to the Premier League for the first time, their win also sending the Bees back into the top-flight for the first time in 74 years; in addition, in a first for English football, all three promoted managers from any of the Football League divisions came from outside the British Isles.

Despite ultimately losing out in the playoff semi-finals, Barnsley were undoubtedly the surprise package of the campaign; having looked likely to battle relegation yet again at the end of October and then seeing their head coach depart for America, the appointment of unknown French manager Valérien Ismaël saw the Tykes rocket up the table - with some impressive results along the way to boot - and comfortably secure 5th place. After having battled against relegation since losing in the play-off final in 2017, Reading enjoyed a much improved season under Serbian head coach Veljko Paunović, only missing out on promotion owing to several bouts of indifferent form throughout the season that the teams above them took advantage of. Despite hovering above the relegation zone for much of the season, Coventry City managed to pull themselves over the line in their first season in the second tier since 2012, a good run of results in the closing months of the campaign pushing them firmly into mid-table - whilst the Sky Blues also received some good news off-pitch, managing to secure a new contract to return to their home stadium of the Ricoh Arena after two seasons away.

For the second reason running, the battle to avoid relegation saw all three places left wide open going into the last round of games – taking bottom place in the closing minutes of the season were Sheffield Wednesday, who fought valiantly to avoid the drop, only for the points deduction (twelve later reduced to six on appeal) for breaching financial rules imposed prior to the start of the season result in survival falling out of their reach, sending the Yorkshire club back into the third tier after a nine-year absence. Rotherham United finished second-bottom, and were relegated straight back to League One, making this the fifth successive season in which they swapped between the two divisions; despite ending up as statistically the worst team in the division, they managed to keep themselves in contention for survival – mostly because of having a multitude of games in hand as a result of two COVID-19 outbreaks – and would actually have survived had they not conceded an 88th-minute equaliser in their final match. Despite having what proved to be a spirited first season in the Championship, Wycombe Wanderers endured an immediate relegation back to League One, their chances ultimately being undone by a dreadful start that saw them lose their first seven games of the campaign, but at least staving off relegation until the last day of the season. Derby County, who struggled all season despite the appointment of Wayne Rooney as manager in November, would also have been relegated if not for Wednesday's points deduction; they did secure survival on the final day by holding Wednesday to a draw, albeit the result would have relegated them both without Rotherham conceding a late equaliser.

Pos	Team	Pld	W	D	L	GF	GA	GD	Pts	Promotion, qualification or relegation
1	Norwich City (C, P)	46	29	10	7	75	36	+39	97	Promotion to the Premier League
2	Watford (P)	46	27	10	9	63	30	+33	91	Promotion to the Premier League
3	Brentford (O, P)	46	24	15	7	79	42	+37	87	Qualification for Championship play-offs
4	Swansea City	46	23	11	12	56	39	+17	80	Qualification for Championship play-offs
5	Barnsley	46	23	9	14	58	50	+8	78	Qualification for Championship play-offs
6	Bournemouth	46	22	11	13	73	46	+27	77	Qualification for Championship play-offs
7	Reading	46	19	13	14	62	54	+8	70	
8	Cardiff City	46	18	14	14	66	49	+17	68	
9	Queens Park Rangers	46	19	11	16	57	55	+2	68	
10	Middlesbrough	46	18	10	18	55	53	+2	64	
11	Millwall	46	15	17	14	47	52	−5	62	
12	Luton Town	46	17	11	18	41	52	−11	62	
13	Preston North End	46	18	7	21	49	56	−7	61	
14	Stoke City	46	15	15	16	50	52	−2	60	
15	Blackburn Rovers	46	15	12	19	65	54	+11	57	
16	Coventry City	46	14	13	19	49	61	−12	55	
17	Nottingham Forest	46	12	16	18	37	45	−8	52	
18	Birmingham City	46	13	13	20	37	61	−24	52	
19	Bristol City	46	15	6	25	46	68	−22	51	
20	Huddersfield Town	46	12	13	21	50	71	−21	49	
21	Derby County	46	11	11	24	36	58	−22	44	
22	Wycombe Wanderers (R)	46	11	10	25	39	69	−30	43	Relegation to EFL League One
23	Rotherham United (R)	46	11	9	26	44	60	−16	42	Relegation to EFL League One
24	Sheffield Wednesday (R)	46	12	11	23	40	61	−21	41 (Note: Sheffield Wednesday received a 12 point deduction for breaching the League's Profitability and Sustainability Rules. This was later reduced to 6 points by an Independent League Arbitration panel.)	Relegation to EFL League One

Source: EFL Official Website
Rules for classification: 1) Points; 2) Goal difference; 3) Number of goals scored; 4) Head-to-head results; 5) Wins; 6) Away goals; 7) Penalty points (sec 9.5); 8) 12-point sending off offences
(C) Champions; (O) Play-off winners; (P) Promoted; (R) Relegated

=== League One ===
Playing in the third tier for the first time since 2005, Hull City made amends for their dramatic collapse in form and consequent relegation the previous season, this time being in the top two for almost the entire campaign and ultimately emerging as champions. Peterborough United finished as runners-up, making this the third time that manager Darren Ferguson had taken the club into the Championship, and his fourth promotion with the club overall; whilst a number of poor results nearly went against them, the Posh successfully achieved promotion in a 3–3 draw with Lincoln City. Taking the final promotion via the playoffs and ending a six-year exile from the second tier were Blackpool, who marked the end of their first full season under manager Neil Critchley in spectacular fashion; despite making a slow start to the campaign, the Seasiders rocketed up the table and solidified themselves in the top six, coming from behind to beat Lincoln City in the final.

Whilst ultimately missing out on promotion yet again, Sunderland did at least secure some success in their third consecutive League One season by winning their first EFL Trophy - whilst also gaining new ownership in the process, in the form of 24 year old businessman Kyril Louis-Dreyfus. A very poor start to the campaign for Burton Albion saw the Brewers pulled into a relegation battle, a battle which was won with games to spare following the return of influential manager Jimmy Floyd Hasselbaink for a second spell as manager. Wigan Athletic endured what proved to be yet another turbulent season both on and off the pitch, battling both a potential second successive relegation (and a potential fourth in seven seasons) and an uncertain future; however, a superb run of form late in the season that coincided with the Latics managing to find new ownership helped save the club from the drop.

Bristol Rovers finished bottom and returned to League Two for the first time in five years, with three different managers all trying and failing to improve the club's fortunes during the season. Swindon Town's season rapidly fell apart after promotion-winning manager Richie Wellens moved to Salford City early in the campaign, finishing the season with both the most defeats and the worst defence in the division as they suffered immediate relegation back to League Two; fellow newly promoted side Northampton Town joined them in immediate relegation, ultimately being cost dear by a terrible run of form in the winter. Rochdale occupied the fourth and final relegation spot, bringing an end to their longest spell to date in the third tier and finally enduring the relegation they had battled against in previous seasons.

Pos	Team	Pld	W	D	L	GF	GA	GD	Pts	Promotion, qualification or relegation
1	Hull City (C, P)	46	27	8	11	80	38	+42	89	Promotion to the EFL Championship
2	Peterborough United (P)	46	26	9	11	83	46	+37	87	Promotion to the EFL Championship
3	Blackpool (O, P)	46	23	11	12	60	37	+23	80	Qualification for League One play-offs
4	Sunderland	46	20	17	9	70	42	+28	77	Qualification for League One play-offs
5	Lincoln City	46	22	11	13	69	50	+19	77	Qualification for League One play-offs
6	Oxford United	46	22	8	16	77	56	+21	74	Qualification for League One play-offs
7	Charlton Athletic	46	20	14	12	70	56	+14	74	
8	Portsmouth	46	21	9	16	65	51	+14	72	
9	Ipswich Town	46	19	12	15	46	46	0	69	
10	Gillingham	46	19	10	17	63	60	+3	67	
11	Accrington Stanley	46	18	13	15	63	68	−5	67	
12	Crewe Alexandra	46	18	12	16	56	61	−5	66	
13	Milton Keynes Dons	46	18	11	17	64	62	+2	65	
14	Doncaster Rovers	46	19	7	20	63	67	−4	64	
15	Fleetwood Town	46	16	12	18	49	46	+3	60	
16	Burton Albion	46	15	12	19	61	73	−12	57	
17	Shrewsbury Town	46	13	15	18	50	57	−7	54	
18	Plymouth Argyle	46	14	11	21	53	80	−27	53	
19	AFC Wimbledon	46	12	15	19	54	70	−16	51	
20	Wigan Athletic	46	13	9	24	54	77	−23	48	
21	Rochdale (R)	46	11	14	21	61	78	−17	47	Relegation to EFL League Two
22	Northampton Town (R)	46	11	12	23	41	67	−26	45	Relegation to EFL League Two
23	Swindon Town (R)	46	13	4	29	55	89	−34	43	Relegation to EFL League Two
24	Bristol Rovers (R)	46	10	8	28	40	70	−30	38	Relegation to EFL League Two

Source: EFL Official Website
Rules for classification: 1) Points; 2) Goal difference; 3) Number of goals scored; 4) Head-to-head results; 5) Wins; 6) Away goals; 7) Penalty points (sec 9.5); 8) 12-point sending off offences
(C) Champions; (O) Play-off winners; (P) Promoted; (R) Relegated

=== League Two ===
In a campaign marked with constant change among the top three, Cheltenham Town secured promotion back to League One for the first time since 2009, having stayed in the promotion race for nearly the entire season before edging back into the top three in late February, never once leaving it. The battle for both the remaining automatic promotion places and the playoff spots ended up going to the final day, with eight different clubs battling it out – but ultimately taking second and third place were Cambridge United and Bolton Wanderers; despite a poor run of form in December, promotion had never looked unlikely for Cambridge United, the U's securing promotion to the third tier for the first time since 2002, giving manager Mark Bonner his first promotion of his managerial career. Having spent the majority of the season looking likely to battle a third successive relegation, a surge in form in 2021 saw Bolton Wanderers rocket up the table and sneak into third place, securing an immediate return to League One and giving hope for a revival in form for the Greater Manchester club after years of struggle on and off the field. Winning the play-off final, and thereby securing promotion to the third tier for the first time in their history was Morecambe; a remarkable achievement considering their consistent battles against relegation in the previous seasons (which had seen them only escape relegation the previous season due to the demise of both Bury and Macclesfield Town), seeing off Newport County via a controversial penalty in extra time.

In their first ever Football League season, Harrogate Town defied all expectations and achieved safety with a number of games to spare – whilst inconsistent form prevented the Yorkshire side from challenging for promotion, they were never in any serious danger of an immediate return to non-league football. Barrow's first Football League season for 48 years saw the North West club ultimately secure survival against all odds – whilst first hit by the loss of influential manager Ian Evatt to Bolton Wanderers and then sacking two different managers before the end of February with results and form looking bleak, the club managed to pull themselves over the line thanks in part to caretaker manager Rob Kelly, who oversaw 10 of the Bluebirds' 13 wins in both his caretaker spells.

At the other end of the table, Grimsby Town endured a season full of struggle on and off the pitch that ultimately culminated in relegation – with even the return of manager Paul Hurst, who had overseen their return to the Football League in 2016, failing to help the Lincolnshire club escape the drop. Finishing just above them were Southend United, who suffered their second consecutive relegation and fell out of the Football League for the first time in their history, a run of just one win in their opening 15 games on top of an inability to score (their total of 29 goals being the lowest scored by anyone in a 24-team division since 1982) ended up setting the tone for the Essex club's hopes and in similar circumstances to Grimsby, the return of former manager Phil Brown late in the season proved to be too late to save the Shrimpers from losing their 101-year Football League status.

Pos	Team	Pld	W	D	L	GF	GA	GD	Pts	Promotion, qualification or relegation
1	Cheltenham Town (C, P)	46	24	10	12	61	39	+22	82	Promotion to the EFL League One
2	Cambridge United (P)	46	24	8	14	73	49	+24	80	Promotion to the EFL League One
3	Bolton Wanderers (P)	46	23	10	13	59	50	+9	79	Promotion to the EFL League One
4	Morecambe (O, P)	46	23	9	14	69	58	+11	78	Qualification for League Two play-offs
5	Newport County	46	20	13	13	57	42	+15	73	Qualification for League Two play-offs
6	Forest Green Rovers	46	20	13	13	59	51	+8	73	Qualification for League Two play-offs
7	Tranmere Rovers	46	20	13	13	55	50	+5	73	Qualification for League Two play-offs
8	Salford City	46	19	14	13	54	34	+20	71	
9	Exeter City	46	18	16	12	71	50	+21	70	
10	Carlisle United	46	18	12	16	60	51	+9	66	
11	Leyton Orient	46	17	10	19	53	55	−2	61	
12	Crawley Town	46	16	13	17	56	62	−6	61	
13	Port Vale	46	17	9	20	57	57	0	60	
14	Stevenage	46	14	18	14	41	41	0	60	
15	Bradford City	46	16	11	19	48	53	−5	59	
16	Mansfield Town	46	13	19	14	57	55	+2	58	
17	Harrogate Town	46	16	9	21	52	61	−9	57	
18	Oldham Athletic	46	15	9	22	72	81	−9	54	
19	Walsall	46	11	20	15	45	53	−8	53	
20	Colchester United	46	11	18	17	44	61	−17	51	
21	Barrow	46	13	11	22	53	59	−6	50	
22	Scunthorpe United	46	13	9	24	41	64	−23	48	
23	Southend United (R)	46	10	15	21	29	58	−29	45	Relegation to National League
24	Grimsby Town (R)	46	10	13	23	37	69	−32	43	Relegation to National League

Updated to match(es) played on 31 May 2021. Source: EFL Official Website
Rules for classification: 1) Points; 2) Goal difference; 3) Number of goals scored; 4) Head-to-head results; 5) Wins; 6) Away goals; 7) Penalty points (sec 9.5); 8) 12-point sending off offences
(C) Champions; (O) Play-off winners; (P) Promoted; (R) Relegated

=== National League ===
In a season marked with different teams taking top spot across the season, as well as postponement, delays and expunged results off the field, Sutton United finished top in their penultimate game and secured promotion to the Football League for the first time in their 123-year history, despite playing effectively with no fans all season. Taking the final battle through the play-offs, in a fight that went all the way to penalties in the final at Ashton Gate, were Hartlepool United, who reversed a run of three bottom-half finishes since falling out of the Football League in 2017 and ended manager Dave Challinor's first full season as Pools manager in superb fashion.

Mounting financial problems finally took its toll on Macclesfield Town, who were expelled from the National League and then finally wound up in the High Court before the campaign even began – the only positive coming late in the season, with the assets being rebranded as Macclesfield FC and the new club being given the go-ahead to enter the tenth tier for next season. Dover Athletic also encountered financial problems, which resulted in the team refusing to play due to a lack of promised funding and their results expunged for the season, on top of a points deduction being imposed at the start of the next campaign. As a result of the National League electing to declare the sixth tier null and void, no teams were relegated or promoted between the fifth and sixth tiers; a combination of all these factors proved beneficial for King's Lynn Town and Barnet, who were at threat of being cut adrift at the bottom of the table with the most losses and the worst defences in the division, ensuring fifth tier status for both clubs for next season.

Pos	Team	Pld	W	D	L	GF	GA	GD	Pts	Promotion, qualification or relegation
1	Sutton United (C, P)	42	25	9	8	72	36	+36	84	Promotion to EFL League Two
2	Torquay United	42	23	11	8	68	39	+29	80	Qualification for the National League play-off semi-finals
3	Stockport County	42	21	14	7	69	32	+37	77	Qualification for the National League play-off semi-finals
4	Hartlepool United (O, P)	42	22	10	10	66	43	+23	76	Qualification for the National League play-off quarter-finals
5	Notts County	42	20	10	12	62	41	+21	70	Qualification for the National League play-off quarter-finals
6	Chesterfield	42	21	6	15	60	43	+17	69	Qualification for the National League play-off quarter-finals
7	Bromley	42	19	12	11	63	53	+10	69	Qualification for the National League play-off quarter-finals
8	Wrexham	42	19	11	12	64	43	+21	68	
9	Eastleigh	42	18	12	12	49	40	+9	66	
10	FC Halifax Town	42	19	8	15	63	54	+9	65	
11	Solihull Moors	42	19	7	16	58	48	+10	64	
12	Dagenham & Redbridge	42	17	9	16	53	48	+5	60	
13	Maidenhead United	42	15	11	16	62	60	+2	56	
14	Boreham Wood	42	13	16	13	52	48	+4	55	
15	Aldershot Town	42	15	7	20	59	66	−7	52	
16	Yeovil Town	42	15	7	20	58	68	−10	52	
17	Altrincham	42	12	11	19	46	60	−14	47	
18	Weymouth	42	11	6	25	45	71	−26	39	
19	Wealdstone	42	10	7	25	49	99	−50	37	
20	Woking	42	8	9	25	42	69	−27	33	
21	King's Lynn Town	42	7	10	25	50	98	−48	31	Reprieved from relegation (Note: Due to the cancellation of both the National North and South seasons, there was no relegation from the National League in the 2020-21 season.)
22	Barnet	42	8	7	27	37	88	−51	31	Reprieved from relegation
23	Dover Athletic	0	0	0	0	0	0	0	0 (Note: Dover Athletic refused to play matches due to a lack of promised funding starting with their fixture on 30 January 2021. On 26 March 2021, it was announced the club would play no part in the rest of the season and all results would be expunged.)	Results expunged
24	Macclesfield Town	0	0	0	0	0	0	0	0 (Note: Macclesfield were deducted 17 points for entering into an insolvency event the previous season, before being expelled from the league on 29 September 2020. At the time of their expulsion before the 2020–21 National League Season, they had played no matches.)	Club expelled and folded

Source: National League official site
Rules for classification: 1) Points; 2) Goal difference; 3) Number of goals scored; 4) Number of matches won; 5) Head-to-head results
(C) Champions; (O) Play-off winners; (P) Promoted

=== League play-offs ===
==== Football League play-offs ====
===== EFL Championship =====
====== Final ======
29 May 2021
15:00 BST

Brentford	2–0	Swansea City
Toney 10' (pen.); Marcondes 20'	Report

Wembley Stadium, London
Attendance: 11,689
Referee: Chris Kavanagh

===== EFL League One =====
====== Final ======
30 May 2021
15:00 BST

Blackpool	2–1	Lincoln City
Dougall 34', 54'	Report	Turton 1' (o.g.)

Wembley Stadium, London
Attendance: 9,751
Referee: Tony Harrington

===== EFL League Two =====
====== Final ======
31 May 2021
15:00 BST

Morecambe	1–0 (a.e.t.)	Newport County
Mendes Gomes 107' (pen.)	Report

Wembley Stadium, London
Attendance: 9,083
Referee: Bobby Madley

==== National League play-offs ====
===== National League =====
====== Final ======
20 June 2021
14:00 BST

Torquay United	1–1 (a.e.t.)	Hartlepool United
Covolan 90+5'	Report	Armstrong 35'
Penalties
Waters (penalty missed); Wright (penalty missed); Hall (penalty scored); Lewis (penalty scored); Little (penalty scored); Lemonheigh-Evans (penalty scored); Buse (penalty missed)	4–5	(penalty missed) Featherstone; (penalty missed) Armstrong; (penalty scored) Shelton; (penalty scored) Sterry; (penalty scored) Molyneux; (penalty scored) Elliott; (penalty scored) Donaldson

Ashton Gate Stadium, Bristol
Attendance: 6,606
Referee: Simon Mather

=== Cup competitions ===
==== FA Cup ====
===== Final =====
15 May 2021
17:15 BST

Chelsea	0–1	Leicester City
	Report	Tielemans 63'

Wembley Stadium, London
Attendance: 20,000 (Note: Attendance was capped at 20,000 due to the COVID-19 pandemic in the United Kingdom.)
Referee: Michael Oliver (County Durham)

==== EFL Cup ====
===== Final =====
25 April 2021
16:30 BST

Manchester City	1–0	Tottenham Hotspur
Laporte 82'	Report

Wembley Stadium, London
Attendance: 7,773 (Note: The total number of fans allowed to attend the final was established at 8,000 due to the COVID-19 pandemic in the United Kingdom.)
Referee: Paul Tierney (Lancashire)

==== Community Shield ====
29 August 2020
16:30 BST

Arsenal	1–1	Liverpool
Aubameyang 12'	Report	Minamino 73'
Penalties
Nelson (penalty scored); Maitland-Niles (penalty scored); Cédric (penalty scored); David Luiz (penalty scored); Aubameyang (penalty scored)	5–4	(penalty scored) Salah; (penalty scored) Fabinho; (penalty missed) Brewster; (penalty scored) Minamino; (penalty scored) Jones

Wembley Stadium, London
Attendance: 0 (Note: The match was played behind closed doors due to the COVID-19 pandemic in the United Kingdom.)
Referee: Andre Marriner (Birmingham)

==== EFL Trophy ====
===== 2020 Final =====
13 March 2021
15:00 GMT

Portsmouth	0–0 (a.e.t.)	Salford City
	Report
Penalties
Williams (penalty missed); Curtis (penalty missed); Brown (penalty scored); Raggett (penalty scored)	2–4	(penalty scored) Burgess; (penalty scored) Dieseruvwe; (penalty scored) Thomas-Asante; (penalty scored) Lowe

Wembley Stadium, London
Attendance: 0
Referee: Carl Boyeson

===== 2020–21 =====
====== Final ======
14 March 2021
15:00 GMT

Sunderland	1–0	Tranmere Rovers
Gooch 57'	Report

Wembley Stadium, London
Attendance: 0
Referee: Charles Breakspear

==== FA Trophy ====
===== 2020 Final =====
3 May 2021
17:00

Concord Rangers	0–1	Harrogate Town (Note: Between the fourth round and the semi-finals, Harrogate were promoted to the Football League through the National League play-offs after the season had finished on an average points-per-game basis due to curtailment as a result of the COVID-19 pandemic.)
	Report	Falkingham 76'

Wembley Stadium, London
Attendance: 0
Referee: Peter Bankes

===== 2020–21 =====
====== Final ======
22 May 2021
16:15 BST

Hereford	1–3	Hornchurch
Owen-Evans 13'	Report	Hayles (yellow card) 40'; Ruff 75'; Nash 86', (yellow card) 87'; Brown 90+5'; Parcell (yellow card) 90+5'

Wembley Stadium, London
Attendance: 6,000
Referee: Tony Harrington

== Women's football ==
=== FA Women's Super League ===
Pos	Team	Pld	W	D	L	GF	GA	GD	Pts	Qualification or relegation
1	Chelsea (C)	22	18	3	1	69	10	+59	57	Qualification for the Champions League group stage
2	Manchester City	22	17	4	1	65	13	+52	55	Qualification for the Champions League second round
3	Arsenal	22	15	3	4	63	15	+48	48	Qualification for the Champions League first round
4	Manchester United	22	15	2	5	44	20	+24	47	
5	Everton	22	9	5	8	39	30	+9	32	
6	Brighton & Hove Albion	22	8	3	11	21	41	−20	27	
7	Reading	22	5	9	8	25	41	−16	24	
8	Tottenham Hotspur	22	5	5	12	18	41	−23	20	
9	West Ham United	22	3	6	13	21	39	−18	15	
10	Aston Villa	22	3	6	13	15	47	−32	15	
11	Birmingham City	22	3	6	13	15	44	−29	14 (Note: On 7 May 2021, Birmingham City were deducted one point for fielding an ineligible player in a draw against Reading on 25 April 2021.)	
12	Bristol City (R)	22	2	6	14	18	72	−54	12	Relegation to the Championship

Source: FA WSL
Rules for classification: 1) Points; 2) Goal difference; 3) Number of goals scored.
(C) Champions; (R) Relegated

=== FA Women's Championship ===
Pos	Team	Pld	W	D	L	GF	GA	GD	Pts	Qualification
1	Leicester City (C, P)	20	16	2	2	54	16	+38	50	Promotion to the WSL (Note: Dependent on obtaining a licence.)
2	Durham	20	12	6	2	34	15	+19	42	
3	Liverpool	20	11	6	3	37	15	+22	39	
4	Sheffield United	20	11	5	4	37	15	+22	38	
5	Lewes	20	8	4	8	19	22	−3	28	
6	London City Lionesses	20	6	6	8	19	19	0	24	
7	Crystal Palace	20	5	5	10	27	36	−9	20	
8	Charlton Athletic	20	4	7	9	19	29	−10	19	
9	Blackburn Rovers	20	4	6	10	20	31	−11	18	
10	Coventry United	20	5	1	14	21	51	−30	16	
11	London Bees (R)	20	3	2	15	14	52	−38	11	Relegation to the Southern Premier Division

Rules for classification: 1) Points; 2) Goal difference; 3) Number of goals scored
(C) Champions; (P) Promoted; (R) Relegated

=== FA Women's National League ===
On 5 June 2020, all results were expunged from the 2019–20 FA Women's National League with no teams being promoted or relegated for the 2020–21 season.

==== Northern Premier Division ====
Pos	Team	Pld	W	D	L	GF	GA	GD	Pts	Qualification
1	Huddersfield Town	10	8	1	1	31	15	+16	25	
2	AFC Fylde	8	6	1	1	29	11	+18	19	
3	West Bromwich Albion	9	5	1	3	24	14	+10	16	
4	Derby County	9	5	1	3	27	20	+7	16	
5	Sunderland (P)	9	5	0	4	17	17	0	15	Promotion to the Championship
6	Nottingham Forest	9	4	2	3	22	12	+10	14	
7	Stoke City	8	3	2	3	15	22	−7	11	
8	Burnley	7	3	1	3	11	11	0	10	
9	Middlesbrough	9	2	1	6	15	24	−9	7	
10	Sheffield	9	2	0	7	11	29	−18	6	
11	Hull City	7	1	2	4	9	17	−8	5	
12	Loughborough Foxes	8	0	2	6	8	27	−19	2	

Source: The Football Association
Rules for classification: 1) Points; 2) Goal difference; 3) Number of goals scored
(P) Promoted

==== Southern Premier Division ====
Pos	Team	Pld	W	D	L	GF	GA	GD	Pts	Qualification
1	Watford (P)	8	6	1	1	28	6	+22	19	Promotion to the Championship
2	Oxford United	7	6	0	1	22	6	+16	18	
3	Portsmouth	8	5	1	2	21	8	+13	16	
4	Milton Keynes Dons	8	5	0	3	23	11	+12	15	
5	Crawley Wasps	7	5	0	2	14	5	+9	15	
6	Cardiff City Ladies	4	3	0	1	17	6	+11	9	
7	Chichester & Selsey	6	3	0	3	14	10	+4	9	
8	Yeovil United	5	2	2	1	9	8	+1	8	
9	Keynsham Town	7	2	0	5	13	15	−2	6	
10	Gillingham	7	2	0	5	10	14	−4	6	
11	Plymouth Argyle	7	0	0	7	2	42	−40	0	
12	Hounslow	8	0	0	8	0	42	−42	0	

Source: The Football Association
Rules for classification: 1) Points; 2) Goal difference; 3) Number of goals scored
(P) Promoted

==== Division One North ====
Pos	Team	Pld	W	D	L	GF	GA	GD	Pts
1	Chester-le-Street	6	4	2	0	15	7	+8	14
2	Brighouse Town	5	3	1	1	9	3	+6	10
3	Norton & Stockton Ancients	6	2	2	2	9	8	+1	8
4	Leeds United	6	2	2	2	8	8	0	8
5	Durham Cestria	5	2	1	2	10	8	+2	7
6	Liverpool Feds	3	2	0	1	4	2	+2	6
7	Stockport County	4	2	0	2	8	7	+1	6
8	Newcastle United	3	1	1	1	3	3	0	4
9	Barnsley	6	1	1	4	10	12	−2	4
10	Chorley	3	1	1	1	1	4	−3	4
11	Bradford City	4	0	3	1	4	5	−1	3
12	Bolton	3	0	0	3	2	16	−14	0

Source: The Football Association
Rules for classification: 1) Points; 2) Goal difference; 3) Number of goals scored

==== Division One Midlands ====
Pos	Team	Pld	W	D	L	GF	GA	GD	Pts
1	Wolverhampton Wanderers	6	6	0	0	37	3	+34	18
2	Doncaster Rovers Belles	8	4	3	1	20	12	+8	15
3	Lincoln City	6	4	1	1	27	8	+19	13
4	Solihull Moors	6	3	2	1	20	11	+9	11
5	Long Eaton United	7	3	2	2	15	9	+6	11
6	Boldmere St. Michaels	4	3	1	0	16	4	+12	10
7	Sporting Khalsa	6	2	2	2	9	11	−2	8
8	Bedworth United	7	2	0	5	8	18	−10	6
9	Wem Town	4	1	1	2	4	10	−6	4
10	Holwell Sports	6	1	1	4	9	18	−9	4
11	Burton Albion	7	1	0	6	6	47	−41	3
12	Leafield Athletic	7	0	1	6	6	26	−20	1

Source: The Football Association
Rules for classification: 1) Points; 2) Goal difference; 3) Number of goals scored

==== Division One South East ====
Pos	Team	Pld	W	D	L	GF	GA	GD	Pts
1	Ipswich Town	4	4	0	0	18	0	+18	12
2	Hashtag United	5	4	0	1	16	7	+9	12
3	Enfield Town	6	3	2	1	12	5	+7	11
4	Actonians	4	3	1	0	9	2	+7	10
5	Norwich City	4	3	0	1	10	7	+3	9
6	AFC Wimbledon	5	2	1	2	13	9	+4	7
7	Cambridge United	6	2	1	3	10	20	−10	7
8	Kent Football United	6	1	3	2	7	8	−1	6
9	Leyton Orient	3	1	1	1	5	4	+1	4
10	Cambridge City	7	1	1	5	10	24	−14	4
11	Billericay Town	3	1	0	2	7	7	0	3
12	Stevenage	7	0	0	7	1	25	−24	0

Source: The Football Association
Rules for classification: 1) Points; 2) Goal difference; 3) Number of goals scored

==== Division One South West ====
Pos	Team	Pld	W	D	L	GF	GA	GD	Pts
1	Southampton	4	4	0	0	19	2	+17	12
2	Chesham United	5	4	0	1	23	8	+15	12
3	Swindon Town	4	3	0	1	13	8	+5	9
4	Buckland Athletic	5	3	0	2	11	12	−1	9
5	Exeter City	6	2	2	2	16	18	−2	8
6	Cheltenham Town	5	2	1	2	12	8	+4	7
7	Larkhall Athletic	5	1	3	1	15	15	0	6
8	Maidenhead United	3	1	1	1	6	6	0	4
9	Southampton Women	4	1	1	2	8	9	−1	4
10	Brislington	3	0	0	3	3	16	−13	0
11	Poole Town	6	0	0	6	4	28	−24	0

Source: The Football Association
Rules for classification: 1) Points; 2) Goal difference; 3) Number of goals scored

=== Women's FA Cup ===
==== Final ====
5 December 2021
15:00 GMT

Arsenal	0–3	Chelsea
	Report	Kirby 3'; Kerr 57', 77'

Wembley Stadium, London
Attendance: 40,942
Referee: Helen Conley (Durham)

=== FA Women's League Cup ===
==== Final ====
14 March 2021
14:30 GMT

Bristol City	0–6	Chelsea
	Report	Kerr 2', 10', 48'; Kirby 28', 38'; Reiten 54'

Vicarage Road, Watford, Hertfordshire
Attendance: 0 (behind closed doors)
Referee: Abigail Byrne

=== Women's FA Community Shield ===
29 August 2020
12:30 BST (UTC+1)

Chelsea	2–0	Manchester City
Bright 66'; Cuthbert 90+1'	Report

Wembley Stadium, London
Attendance: 0 (Note: The match was played behind closed doors due to the COVID-19 pandemic in the United Kingdom.)
Referee: Rebecca Welch (Durham)

== Managerial changes ==
This is a list of changes of managers within English league football:

Team	Outgoing manager	Manner of departure	Date of departure	Position in table	Incoming manager	Date of appointment
Barrow	(England) Ian Evatt	Signed by Bolton Wanderers	1 July 2020	Pre-Season	(England) David Dunn	9 July 2020
Bristol City	(England) Lee Johnson	Sacked	4 July 2020	Pre-Season	(England) Dean Holden	10 August 2020
Tranmere Rovers	(Scotland) Micky Mellon	Signed by Dundee United	6 July 2020	Pre-Season	(England) Mike Jackson	21 July 2020
Colchester United	(England) John McGreal	Sacked	14 July 2020	Pre-Season	(England) Steve Ball	28 July 2020
Huddersfield Town	(England) Danny Schofield	End of caretaker spell	19 July 2020	Pre-Season	(Spain) Carlos Corberán	23 July 2020
Birmingham City	(England) Steve Spooner (England) Craig Gardner	End of caretaker spell	22 July 2020	Pre-Season	(Spain) Aitor Karanka	31 July 2020
Watford	(England) Hayden Mullins	End of caretaker spell	22 July 2020	Pre-Season	(Serbia) Vladimir Ivić	15 August 2020
Wigan Athletic	(England) Paul Cook	Resigned	29 July 2020	Pre-Season	(Republic of Ireland) John Sheridan	11 September 2020
Oldham Athletic	(Tunisia) Dino Maamria	Sacked	31 July 2020	Pre-Season	(Australia) Harry Kewell	1 August 2020
Bournemouth	(England) Eddie Howe	Mutual consent	1 August 2020	Pre-Season	(England) Jason Tindall	8 August 2020
Scunthorpe United	(England) Russ Wilcox	End of caretaker spell	7 August 2020	Pre-Season	(England) Neil Cox	7 August 2020
Reading	(Wales) Mark Bowen	Mutual consent	29 August 2020	Pre-Season	(Serbia) Veljko Paunović	29 August 2020
Barnsley	(Austria) Gerhard Struber	Signed by New York Red Bulls	6 October 2020	21st	(France) Valérien Ismaël	23 October 2020
Nottingham Forest	(France) Sabri Lamouchi	Sacked	6 October 2020	22nd	(Republic of Ireland) Chris Hughton	6 October 2020
Salford City	(Scotland) Graham Alexander	Sacked	12 October 2020	5th	(England) Richie Wellens	4 November 2020
Mansfield Town	(Republic of Ireland) Graham Coughlan	Sacked	27 October 2020	22nd	(England) Nigel Clough	6 November 2020
Tranmere Rovers	(England) Mike Jackson	Sacked	31 October 2020	18th	(England) Keith Hill	21 November 2020
Swindon Town	(England) Richie Wellens	Signed by Salford City	4 November 2020	20th	(Republic of Ireland) John Sheridan	13 November 2020
Sheffield Wednesday	(England) Garry Monk	Sacked	9 November 2020	23rd	(Wales) Tony Pulis	13 November 2020
Wigan Athletic	(Republic of Ireland) John Sheridan	Signed by Swindon Town	13 November 2020	24th	(England) Leam Richardson (caretaker)	13 November 2020
Bristol Rovers	(England) Ben Garner	Sacked	14 November 2020	18th	(England) Paul Tisdale	19 November 2020
Derby County	(Netherlands) Phillip Cocu	Mutual consent	14 November 2020	24th	(England) Wayne Rooney (Note: Rooney was initially appointed as interim manager until the end of the season, but the move was made permanent on 15 January 2021.)	27 November 2020
Watford	(Serbia) Vladimir Ivić	Sacked	19 December 2020	5th	(Spain) Xisco Muñoz	20 December 2020
Shrewsbury Town	(Wales) Sam Ricketts	Sacked	25 November 2020	23rd	(England) Steve Cotterill	27 November 2020
Sheffield Wednesday	(Wales) Tony Pulis	Sacked	28 December 2020	23rd	(Jamaica) Darren Moore	1 March 2021
Sunderland	(England) Phil Parkinson	Sacked	29 November 2020	8th	(England) Lee Johnson	5 December 2020
Bradford City	(Scotland) Stuart McCall	Sacked	13 December 2020	22nd	(England) Mark Trueman (England) Conor Sellars	22 February 2021
Barrow	(England) David Dunn	Sacked	13 December 2020	21st	(England) Michael Jolley	23 December 2020
West Bromwich Albion	(Croatia) Slaven Bilić	Sacked	16 December 2020	19th	(England) Sam Allardyce	16 December 2020
Grimsby Town	(England) Ian Holloway	Resigned	23 December 2020	20th	(England) Paul Hurst	30 December 2020
Burton Albion	(England) Jake Buxton	Sacked	29 December 2020	24th	(Netherlands) Jimmy Floyd Hasselbaink	1 January 2021
Fleetwood Town	(England) Joey Barton	Sacked	4 January 2021	10th	(England) Simon Grayson	31 January 2021
Port Vale	(England) John Askey	Sacked	4 January 2021	17th	(England) Darrell Clarke	15 February 2021
Cardiff City	(England) Neil Harris	Sacked	21 January 2021	15th	(Republic of Ireland) Mick McCarthy	22 January 2021
Chelsea	(England) Frank Lampard	Sacked	25 January 2021	9th	(Germany) Thomas Tuchel	26 January 2021
AFC Wimbledon	(Wales) Glyn Hodges	Mutual consent	30 January 2021	21st	(England) Mark Robinson	17 February 2021
Bournemouth	(England) Jason Tindall	Sacked	3 February 2021	6th	(England) Jonathan Woodgate (Note: Woodgate was initially caretaker manager, but was then appointed as manager until the end of the season on 21 February 2021.)	21 February 2021
Bristol Rovers	(England) Paul Tisdale	Sacked	10 February 2021	20th	(England) Joey Barton	22 February 2021
Northampton Town	(England) Keith Curle	Sacked	10 February 2021	23rd	(Australia) Jon Brady	11 February 2021
Walsall	(England) Darrell Clarke	Signed by Port Vale	15 February 2021	11th	(England) Brian Dutton	15 February 2021
Bristol City	(England) Dean Holden	Sacked	16 February 2021	13th	(England) Nigel Pearson	22 February 2021
Barrow	(England) Michael Jolley	Sacked	21 February 2021	23rd	(England) Rob Kelly (Caretaker)	21 February 2021
Colchester United	(England) Steve Ball	Sacked	24 February 2021	21st	(England) Wayne Brown (Caretaker)	24 February 2021
Leyton Orient	(England) Ross Embleton	Sacked	27 February 2021	14th	(Jamaica) Jobi McAnuff (Caretaker)	28 February 2021
Ipswich Town	(Scotland) Paul Lambert	Mutual consent	28 February 2021	8th	(England) Paul Cook	2 March 2020
Doncaster Rovers	(Jamaica) Darren Moore	Signed by Sheffield Wednesday	1 March 2021	6th	(England) Andy Butler (interim)	1 March 2021
Oldham Athletic	(Australia) Harry Kewell	Sacked	7 March 2021	16th	(England) Keith Curle	8 March 2021
Sheffield United	(England) Chris Wilder	Mutual consent	13 March 2021	20th	(England) Paul Heckingbottom (interim)	13 March 2021
Portsmouth	(Wales) Kenny Jackett	Sacked	14 March 2020	7th	(England) Danny Cowley	19 March 2021
Charlton Athletic	(England) Lee Bowyer	Resigned	15 March 2021	8th	(England) Nigel Adkins	18 March 2021
Birmingham City	(Spain) Aitor Karanka	Resigned	16 March 2021	21st	(England) Lee Bowyer	16 March 2021
Preston North End	(Scotland) Alex Neil	Sacked	21 March 2021	16th	(Scotland) Frankie McAvoy (interim)	21 March 2021
Salford City	(England) Richie Wellens	Mutual consent	22 March 2021	9th	(England) Gary Bowyer	23 March 2021
Colchester United	(England) Wayne Brown (Caretaker)	End of caretaker spell	31 March 2021	21st	(England) Hayden Mullins (Caretaker)	31 March 2021
Southend United	(England) Mark Molesley	Mutual consent	9 April 2021	23rd	(England) Phil Brown	9 April 2021
Forest Green Rovers	(England) Mark Cooper	Sacked	11 April 2021	6th	(England) Jimmy Ball (interim)	11 April 2021
Swindon Town	(Republic of Ireland) John Sheridan	Sacked	18 April 2021	24th	(Scotland) Tommy Wright (interim)	18 April 2021
Tottenham Hotspur	(Portugal) José Mourinho	Sacked	19 April 2021	7th	(England) Ryan Mason (interim)	19 April 2021

== New clubs ==
- Bury A.F.C.
- F.C. Isle of Man

== Clubs removed ==
- Bury
- Macclesfield Town

== Deaths ==
- 10 July 2020: Jack Charlton OBE DL, 85, England World Cup winner, who played as a defender for Leeds United and also managed Middlesbrough, Sheffield Wednesday and Newcastle United.
- 13 July 2020: Pat Quinn, 84, Scotland and Blackpool inside forward.
- 17 July 2020: Alex Dawson, 80, Manchester United, Preston North End, Bury, Brighton & Hove Albion and Brentford forward.
- 23 July 2020: Alan Garner, 69, Millwall, Luton Town, Watford and Portsmouth defender.
- 28 July 2020: Gerry Harris, 84, Wolverhampton Wanderers and Walsall left back.
- 29 July 2020: Don Townsend, 89, Charlton Athletic and Crystal Palace left back.
- 2 August 2020: Keith Pontin, 64, Wales and Cardiff City defender.
- 3 August 2020: Ernie Phythian, 78, Bolton Wanderers, Wrexham and Hartlepools United forward.
- c. 7 August 2020: Stuart Metcalfe, 69, Blackburn Rovers, Carlisle United and Crewe Alexandra midfielder.
- 11 August 2020: Mike Tindall, 79, Aston Villa and Walsall midfielder.
- 13 August 2020: Colin Parry, 79, Stockport County and Rochdale defender.
- 13 August 2020: Jackie Wren, 84, Rotherham United goalkeeper.
- 14 August 2020: John Talbut, 79, Burnley and West Bromwich Albion centre half.
- 16 August 2020: Danny Campbell, 76, West Bromwich Albion, Stockport County and Bradford Park Avenue defender.
- 16 August 2020: Tommy Carroll, 77, Republic of Ireland, Ipswich Town and Birmingham City defender.
- 16 August 2020: Malcolm Manley, 70, Leicester City and Portsmouth centre back.
- 16 August 2020: Alan Welsh, 73, Millwall, Torquay United, Plymouth Argyle and A.F.C. Bournemouth winger.
- 2 September 2020: Albert Cheesebrough, 85, Burnley, Leicester City, Port Vale and Mansfield Town forward.
- 2 September 2020: Fred Davies, 81, Wolverhampton Wanderers, Cardiff City and A.F.C. Bournemouth goalkeeper, who also managed Shrewsbury Town.
- 9 September 2020: Tony Villars, 68, Wales, Cardiff City and Newport County winger.
- 17 September 2020: Reg Harrison, 97, Derby County winger.
- 19 September 2020: John Quinn, 82, Sheffield Wednesday, Rotherham United and Halifax Town utility player.
- 20 September 2020: Keith Jobling, 86, Grimsby Town centre half.
- 21 September 2020: Brian Peterson, 83, Blackpool forward.
- 25 September 2020: Peter Hampton, 66, Leeds United, Stoke City, Burnley, Rochdale and Carlisle United left back.
- 1 October 2020: Barry Mahy, 78, USA and Scunthorpe United defender.
- 5 October 2020: Wayne Williams, 56, Shrewsbury Town, Northampton Town and Walsall defender.
- c. 5 October 2020: Bob Wilson, 77, Aston Villa, Cardiff City and Exeter City goalkeeper.
- 8 October 2020: Sam Burton, 93, Swindon Town goalkeeper.
- 8 October 2020: Tommy Robson, 76, Northampton Town, Chelsea, Newcastle United and Peterborough United winger.
- 11 October 2020: Richie Barker, 80, Derby County, Notts County and Peterborough United forward, who also managed Shrewsbury Town, Stoke City and Notts County.
- 17 October 2020: Alan Bradshaw, 79, Blackburn Rovers and Crewe Alexandra midfielder.
- 19 October 2020: Jim Townsend, 75, Middlesbrough midfielder
- 21 October 2020: Gordon Astall, 93, England, Plymouth Argyle, Birmingham City and Torquay United outside right.
- 27 October 2020: Hugh Morrow, 90, West Bromwich Albion and Northampton Town winger.
- 30 October 2020: Nobby Stiles MBE, 78, England World Cup winner, who played as a defensive midfielder for Manchester United, Middlesbrough and Preston North End, as well as a manager of Preston North End and West Bromwich Albion.
- 31 October 2020: Marius Žaliūkas, 36, Lithuania and Leeds United defender.
- 4 November 2020: Matt Tees, 81, Grimsby Town, Charlton Athletic and Luton Town forward.
- 5 November 2020: Brian O'Donnell, 63, A.F.C. Bournemouth and Torquay United defender.
- 6 November 2020: Harry Holman, 62, Exeter City and Peterborough United forward.
- 9 November 2020: Doug Wragg, 86, West Ham United, Mansfield Town, Rochdale and Chesterfield winger.
- 10 November 2020: Tony Waiters, 83, England, Blackpool and Burnley goalkeeper, who also managed Plymouth Argyle.
- 11 November 2020: Les Massie, 85, Huddersfield Town, Darlington, Halifax Town, Bradford Park Avenue and Workington inside forward.
- 12 November 2020: Albert Quixall, 87, England, Sheffield Wednesday, Manchester United, Oldham Athletic and Stockport County inside forward.
- 13 November 2020: Gwyn Jones, 85, Wolverhampton Wanderers and Bristol Rovers defender.
- 15 November 2020: Ray Clemence MBE, 72, England, Scunthorpe United, Liverpool and Tottenham Hotspur goalkeeper, who also managed Tottenham Hotspur and Barnet.
- 15 November 2020: Campbell Forsyth, 86, Scotland and Southampton goalkeeper.
- 17 November 2020: John Poole, 87, Port Vale goalkeeper.
- 18 November 2020: Adam Musial, 71, Hereford United defender.
- 19 November 2020: Stan Trafford, 74, Port Vale forward.
- c. 19 November 2020: Kevin Charlton, 66, A.F.C. Bournemouth, Hereford United and Scarborough goalkeeper.
- 21 November 2020: John Rowland, 79, Nottingham Forest, Port Vale, Mansfield Town and Tranmere Rovers forward.
- 23 November 2020: Maurice Setters, 83, Exeter City, West Bromwich Albion, Manchester United, Stoke City, Coventry City and Charlton Athletic wing half, who also managed Doncaster Rovers.
- 29 November 2020: Papa Bouba Diop, 42, Senegal, Fulham, Portsmouth, West Ham United and Birmingham City midfielder.
- 3 December 2020: Bill Holmes, 94, Doncaster Rovers, Blackburn Rovers and Bradford City striker.
- 4 December 2020: Jimmy Fletcher, 89, Gillingham striker.
- 8 December 2020: Alejandro Sabella, 66, Argentina, Sheffield United and Leeds United midfielder.
- 14 December 2020: Gérard Houllier OBE, 73, Liverpool and Aston Villa manager.
- 14 December 2020: John McSeveney, 89, Sunderland, Cardiff City, Newport County and Hull City winger, who also managed Barnsley
- 14 December 2020: George Sharples, 77, Everton, Blackburn Rovers and Southport wing half.
- c. 18 December 2020: Steve Ingle, 74, Bradford City, Southend United, Wrexham, Stockport County, Southport and Darlington right back.
- 21 December 2020: John Fitzpatrick, 74, Manchester United full back/wing half.
- 23 December 2020: Eddie McLaren, 91, Reading right back/wing half.
- 24 December 2020: Davie Sneddon MBE, 84, Preston North End inside forward
- 26 December 2020: Mike Sutton, 76, Norwich City, Chester and Carlisle United midfielder.
- 27 December 2020: Eddie Moss, 81, Southport inside forward.
- 28 December 2020: Tom Docherty, 96, Lincoln City, Reading, Norwich City and Newport County winger
- 28 December 2020: George Hudson, 83, Accrington Stanley, Peterborough United, Coventry City, Northampton Town and Tranmere Rovers forward.
- 28 December 2020: Colin Withers, 80, Birmingham City, Aston Villa and Lincoln City goalkeeper.
- 31 December 2020: Tommy Docherty, 92, Preston North End, Arsenal and Chelsea right half, who also managed Chelsea, Rotherham United, Queens Park Rangers, Aston Villa, Manchester United, Derby County, Preston North End and Wolverhampton Wanderers.
- 1 January 2021: Clint Boulton, 72, Port Vale and Torquay United defender.
- 5 January 2021: Colin Bell MBE, 74, England, Bury and Manchester City midfielder.
- 10 January 2021: Tosh Chamberlain, 86, Fulham forward.
- 10 January 2021: Tony Gregory, 83, Luton Town and Watford wing half.
- 10 January 2021: Bobby Kellard, 77, Southend United, Crystal Palace, Ipswich Town, Portsmouth, Bristol City, Leicester City and Torquay United midfielder.
- 15 January 2021: Geoff Barnett, 74, Everton and Arsenal goalkeeper.
- c. 20 January 2021: John Jeffers, 52, Port Vale and Stockport County winger.
- 20 January 2021: Malcolm Slater, 82, Southend United and Leyton Orient winger.
- 21 January 2021: Peter Swan, 84, England, Sheffield Wednesday and Bury defender.
- 22 January 2021: Luton Shelton, 35, Jamaica and Sheffield United forward.
- c. 22 January 2021: Johnny Williams, 73, Watford and Colchester United left back.
- 23 January 2021: Peter Gillott, 85, Barnsley full back.
- 24 January 2021: Barrie Mitchell, 73, Tranmere Rovers, Preston North End and York City forward.
- 24 January 2021: Ron Rafferty, 86, Portsmouth, Grimsby Town, Hull City and Aldershot forward.
- 26 January 2021: John Mortimore, 86, Chelsea and Queens Park Rangers centre half, who also managed Portsmouth.
- 26 January 2021: Dr. Jozef Vengloš, 84, Aston Villa manager.
- 28 January 2021: Eddie Connachan, 85, Scotland and Middlesbrough goalkeeper.
- 31 January 2021: John Gibbons, 95, Queens Park Rangers and Ipswich Town forward.
- 1 February 2021: Peter Hindley, 76, Nottingham Forest, Coventry City and Peterborough United right back.
- 4 February 2021: Ben Hannigan, 77, Wrexham inside forward
- 6 February 2021: Ken Roberts, 84, Wrexham and Aston Villa winger, who also managed Chester.
- c. 7 February 2021: Whelan Ward, 91, Bradford City and Bradford Park Avenue striker.
- 8 February 2021: Tony Collins, 94, York City, Watford, Norwich City, Torquay United, Crystal Palace and Rochdale winger, who also managed Rochdale and was the first black manager to manage in the English Football League.
- 8 February 2021: Graham Day, 67, Bristol Rovers defender.
- 10 February 2021: Dai Davies, 72, Wales, Swansea City, Everton, Wrexham and Tranmere Rovers goalkeeper.
- c. 11 February 2021: John James, 72, Port Vale, Chester and Tranmere Rovers striker.
- 11 February 2021: John Kirkham, 79, Wolverhampton Wanderers, Peterborough United and Exeter City wing half.
- 12 February 2021: Norman Jukes, 88, York City defender.
- 12 February 2021: Alan Woan, 90, Norwich City, Northampton Town, Crystal Palace and Aldershot inside forward.
- 17 February 2021: John Manning, 80, Tranmere Rovers, Shrewsbury Town, Norwich City, Bolton Wanderers, Walsall, Crewe Alexandra and Barnsley forward.
- 22 February 2021: Jack Bolton, 79, Ipswich Town defender.
- 28 February 2021: Glenn Roeder, 65, Leyton Orient, Queens Park Rangers, Newcastle United, Watford and Gillingham defender, who also managed Gillingham, Watford, West Ham United, Newcastle United and Norwich City.
- 1 March 2021: Ian St John, 82, Scotland, Liverpool, Coventry City and Tranmere Rovers forward, who also managed Portsmouth.
- 4 March 2021: Phil Chisnall, 78, Manchester United, Liverpool, Southend United and Stockport County forward.
- 4 March 2021: Willie Whigham, 81, Middlesbrough goalkeeper.
- 5 March 2021: Mickey Lewis, 56, West Bromwich Albion, Derby County and Oxford United midfielder.
- 9 March 2021: Micky Brown, 76, Fulham, Millwall, Luton Town and Colchester United forward.
- 9 March 2021: Bob Graves, 78, Lincoln City goalkeeper.
- 11 March 2021: Ron Phoenix, 91, Manchester City and Rochdale wing half.
- c. 11 March 2021: Jimmy Stevenson, 74, Southend United left half.
- 17 March 2021: Steve Jagielka, 43, Shrewsbury Town midfielder.
- 20 March 2021: Peter Lorimer, 74, Scotland, Leeds United and York City midfielder, who is Leeds United's record goalscorer.
- 21 March 2021: Terry Melling, 81, Watford, Newport County, Mansfield Town, Rochdale and Darlington forward.
- 22 March 2021: Alan Slough, 73, Luton Town, Fulham, Peterborough United and Millwall midfielder.
- 22 March 2021: Frank Worthington, 72, England, Huddersfield Town, Leicester City, Bolton Wanderers, Birmingham City, Leeds United, Sunderland, Southampton, Brighton & Hove Albion, Tranmere Rovers, Preston North End and Stockport County forward, who also managed Tranmere Rovers.
- 23 March 2021: Len Fletcher, 91, Ipswich Town wing half.
- 24 March 2021: Derek Hawksworth, 94, Bradford City, Sheffield United, Huddersfield Town and Lincoln City winger.
- 27 March 2021: Derek Ufton, 92, England and Charlton Athletic defender, who also managed Plymouth Argyle.
- 31 March 2021: Lee Collins, 32, Port Vale, Barnsley, Northampton Town Mansfield Town and Forest Green Rovers defender, who was still playing for Yeovil Town at the time of his death.
- 7 April 2021: Doug Holden, 90, England, Bolton Wanderers and Preston North End winger.
- 11 April 2021: Colin Baker, 86, Wales and Cardiff City wing half.
- 12 April 2021: Peter Goy, 82, Arsenal, Southend United, Watford and Huddersfield Town goalkeeper.
- 17 April 2021: Wayne Talkes, 68, Southampton and A.F.C. Bournemouth midfielder.
- 24 April 2021: Walter Borthwick, 73, Brighton & Hove Albion midfielder.
- 26 April 2021: Peter Gelson, 79, Brentford defender.
- 26 April 2021: Ian Hamilton, 80, Bristol Rovers and Newport County inside forward.
- 28 April 2021: Steve Perks, 58, Shrewsbury Town goalkeeper.
- 29 April 2021: Zhang Enhua, 48, China and Grimsby Town defender.
- 4 May 2021: Frank Brogan, 78, Ipswich Town and Halifax Town winger.
- 4 May 2021: Steve Conroy, 64, Sheffield United, Rotherham United and Rochdale goalkeeper.
- 4 May 2021: Alan McLoughlin, 54, Republic of Ireland, Swindon Town, Southampton, Portsmouth, Wigan Athletic and Rochdale midfielder.
- 9 May 2021: James Dean, 35, Bury striker.
- 20 May 2021: Len Badger, 75, Sheffield United and Chesterfield defender.
- 20 May 2021: Chris Chilton, 77, Hull City and Coventry City striker, who holds the record for the most goals scored by a Hull City player.
- 20 May 2021: Eric Winstanley, 76, Barnsley and Chesterfield defender.
- 31 May 2021: Colin Appleton, 85, Leicester City, Charlton Athletic and Barrow defender, who also managed Barrow, Hull City, Swansea City and Exeter City.

== Retirements ==
- 1 July 2020: Will Buckley, 30, former Rochdale, Watford, Brighton & Hove Albion, Sunderland, Leeds United, Birmingham City, Sheffield Wednesday, and Bolton Wanderers winger
- 1 July 2020: Michael Raynes, 32, former Stockport County, Scunthorpe United, Rotherham United, Oxford United, Carlisle United and Crewe Alexandra defender.
- 8 July 2020: Bobby Olejnik, 33, former Torquay United, Peterborough United, Scunthorpe United, York City, Exeter City and Mansfield Town goalkeeper.
- 12 July 2020: Mile Jedinak, 35, former Australia, Crystal Palace and Aston Villa midfielder.
- 13 July 2020: Federico Bessone, 36, former Swansea City, Leeds United, Charlton Athletic, Swindon Town and Millwall defender.
- 14 July 2020: Matt Mills, 34, former Southampton, Manchester City, Doncaster Rovers, Reading, Leicester City, Bolton Wanderers, Nottingham Forest, Barnsley and Forest Green Rovers defender.
- 17 July 2020: André Schürrle, 29, Germany World Cup winner and former Chelsea and Fulham attacking midfielder.
- 21 July 2020: Jamie Mackie, 34, former Scotland, Wimbledon, MK Dons, Plymouth Argyle, Queens Park Rangers, Nottingham Forest, Reading and Oxford United forward.
- 26 July 2020: Leighton Baines, 35, former England, Wigan Athletic and Everton defender.
- 12 August 2020: Stephan Lichtsteiner, 36, former Switzerland and Arsenal defender.
- 14 August 2020: Lee Cattermole, 32, former Middlesbrough, Wigan Athletic and Sunderland midfielder.
- 21 August 2020: Ali Al-Habsi, 38, former Oman, Bolton Wanderers, Wigan Athletic and Reading goalkeeper.
- 21 August 2020: Neal Bishop, 39, former Barnet, Notts County, Blackpool, Scunthorpe United and Mansfield Town midfielder.
- 27 August 2020: Gareth Barry, 39, former England, Aston Villa, Manchester City, Everton and West Bromwich Albion midfielder.
- 13 September 2020: Lloyd Dyer, 38, former West Bromwich Albion, Millwall, Milton Keynes Dons, Leicester City, Watford, Burnley, Burton Albion and Bolton Wanderers winger.
- 16 October 2020: Pablo Zabaleta, 35, former Argentina, Manchester City and West Ham United defender.
- 17 October 2020: James Collins, 37, former Wales, Cardiff City, West Ham United, Aston Villa and Ipswich Town defender.
- 26 October 2020: Michel Vorm, 37, former Netherlands, Swansea City and Tottenham Hotspur goalkeeper.
- 15 November 2020: Javier Mascherano, 36, former Argentina, West Ham United and Liverpool midfielder.
- 17 November 2020: Darren Potter, 35, former Republic of Ireland, Liverpool, Wolverhampton Wanderers, Sheffield Wednesday, Milton Keynes Dons, Rotherham United and Tranmere Rovers midfielder.
- 23 November 2020: Alex Bruce, 36, former Republic of Ireland, Northern Ireland, Birmingham City, Ipswich Town, Leeds United, Hull City, Bury and Wigan Athletic defender.
- 24 November 2020: Marcin Wasilewski, 40, former Poland and Leicester City defender.
- 1 December 2020: Jabo Ibehre, 37, former Leyton Orient, Walsall, Milton Keynes Dons, Colchester United, Carlisle United and Cambridge United forward.
- 2 December 2020: Aaron Wilbraham, 41, former Stockport County, Hull City, Milton Keynes Dons, Norwich City, Crystal Palace, Bristol City, Bolton Wanderers and Rochdale forward.
- 15 January 2021: Wayne Rooney, 35, former England, Everton, Manchester United and Derby County forward.
- 26 January 2021: Ashley Williams, 36, former Wales, Stockport County, Swansea City, Everton and Bristol City defender.
- 4 February 2021: Danny Graham, 35, former Middlesbrough, Carlisle United, Watford, Swansea City, Sunderland and Blackburn Rovers striker.
- 10 February 2021: Ron Vlaar, 35, former Netherlands and Aston Villa defender.
- 18 February 2021: Bobby Copping, 19, former Peterborough United defender.
- 19 February 2021: Yohan Cabaye, 35, former France, Newcastle United and Crystal Palace midfielder.
- 27 February 2021: Luke Hyam, 29, former Ipswich Town and Southend United midfielder.
- 1 March 2021: Nikica Jelavić, 35, former Croatia, Everton, Hull City and West Ham United forward.
- 24 March 2021: Lewis Hardcastle, 22, former Barrow midfielder.
- 20 April 2021: Àngel Rangel, 38, former Swansea City and Queens Park Rangers right back.
- 1 May 2021: Sam Togwell, 36, former Scunthorpe United, Barnet, Barnsley and Chesterfield defensive midfielder.
- 6 May 2021: Gary Sawyer, 35, former Plymouth Argyle, Bristol Rovers and Leyton Orient defender.
- 8 May 2021: Romain Vincelot, 35, former Dagenham & Redbridge, Brighton & Hove Albion, Leyton Orient, Coventry City, Bradford City, Crawley Town, Shrewsbury Town and Stevenage midfielder.
- 8 May 2021: Jon Stead, 38, former Huddersfield Town, Blackburn Rovers, Sunderland, Sheffield United, Ipswich Town, Bristol City, Notts County and Harrogate Town striker.
- 8 May 2021: Scott Golbourne, 33, former Bristol City, Reading, Exeter City, Barnsley, Wolverhampton Wanderers and Shrewsbury Town defender.
- 9 May 2021: Jobi McAnuff, 39, former Jamaica, Wimbledon, West Ham United, Cardiff City, Crystal Palace, Watford, Reading, Leyton Orient and Stevenage midfielder.
- 10 May 2021: Mark Tyler, 44, former Peterborough United and Luton Town goalkeeper.
- 10 May 2021: Paul Gallagher, 36, former Scotland, Blackburn Rovers, Leicester City and Preston North End midfielder.
- 12 May 2021: Antonio Valencia, 35, former Ecuador, Wigan Athletic and Manchester United winger/wing-back.
- 17 May 2021: Vedran Ćorluka, 35, former Croatia, Manchester City and Tottenham Hotspur defender.
- 21 May 2021: Wes Morgan, 37, former Jamaica, Nottingham Forest and Leicester City defender.
- 27 May 2021: Jimmy Smith, 34, former Chelsea, Leyton Orient, Stevenage and Crawley Town midfielder.
- 27 May 2021: James Vaughan, 32, former Everton, Norwich City, Huddersfield Town, Birmingham City, Bury, Sunderland, Wigan Athletic, Bradford City and Tranmere Rovers forward.
- 31 May 2021: Glenn Murray, 37, former Carlisle United, Rochdale, Brighton & Hove Albion, Crystal Palace, A.F.C. Bournemouth and Nottingham Forest striker.
