= Wren (name) =

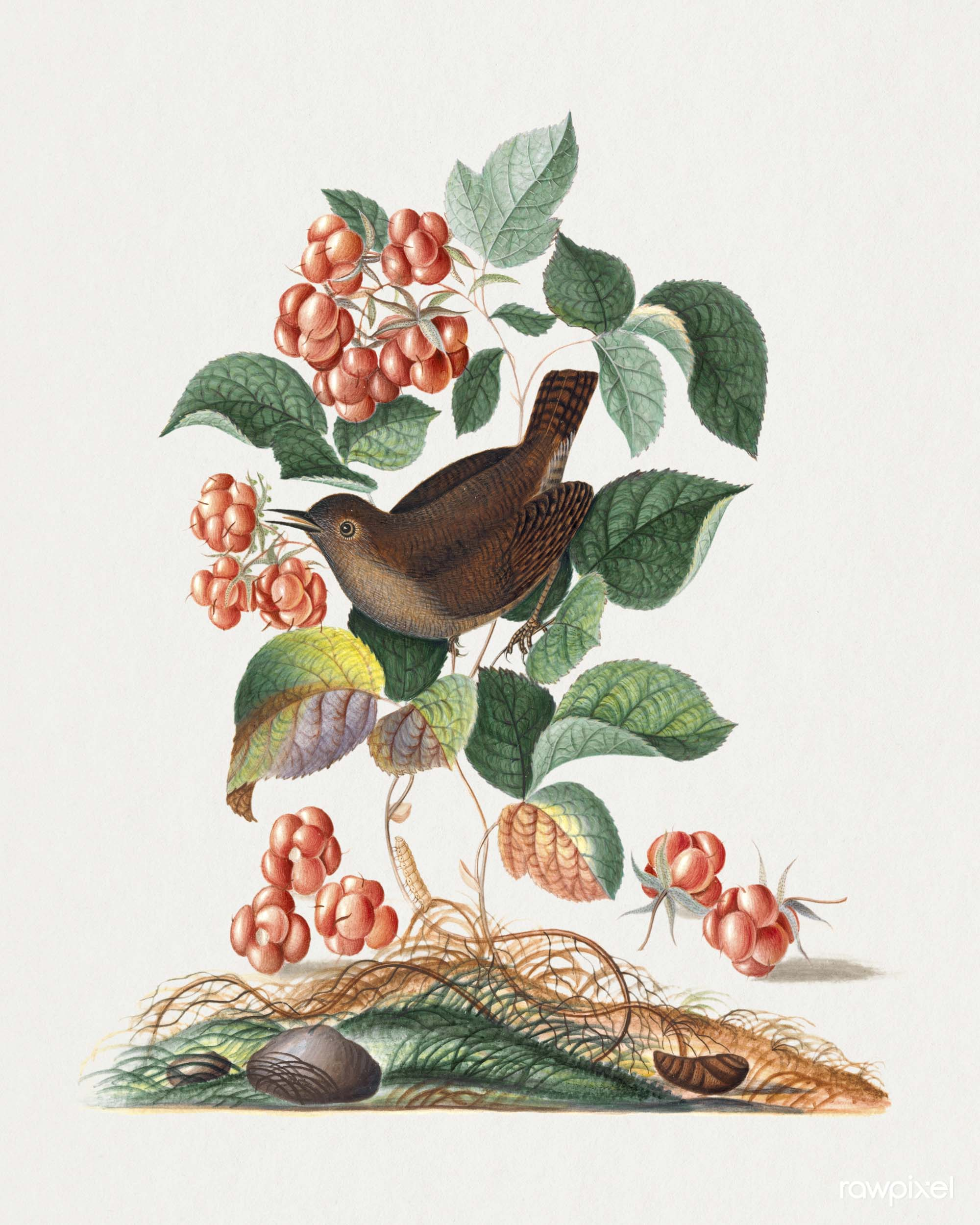
- A painting of a Eurasian wren by Anna Blackburne, 1768
- Pronunciation: REN
- Gender: unisex

Origin
- Meaning: derived from the name of the songbird

Wren is both an English surname and a gender neutral given name, both derived from the English name of the songbird.

It has recently increased in popularity as a name for girls and boys in the Anglosphere along with other names derived from the natural world. It has been ranked among the 1,000 most popular names for newborns in the United States since 2013 and among the top 500 names for girls in England and Wales since 2014. Wrenlee and Wrenley, which are elaborations of the name, have both increased in usage for girls in the United States as well.

== Surname ==
- Alan Wren (born 1964), English rock drummer
- Bob Wren (born 1974), Canadian ice hockey player
- Brian Wren (born 1936), English hymn-poet and writer
- Caroline Wren, political campaign worker
- Christopher Wren (1632–1723), English architect and scientist
- Christopher Wren (priest) (1589–1658), Anglican cleric, Dean of Windsor and father of the architect
- Christopher Wren the Younger (1675–1747), English Member of Parliament, son of the architect
- Daniel A. Wren (born ca. 1935), American business theorist
- Frank Wren (born 1958), American baseball executive
- Harold Wren (1921–2016), American dean of three law schools
- Jackie Wren (1936–2020), Scottish footballer
- John Wren (1871–1953), Australian businessman
- Kyle Wren (born 1991), American baseball player
- M. K. Wren (1938–2016), American author
- Margery Wren (1850–1930), English murder victim
- Matthew Wren (1585–1667), English clergyman and scholar
- P. C. Wren (1875–1941), British author
- Renell Wren (born 1995), American football player
- Thomas Wren (disambiguation)

== Given name ==
- Wren Blair (1925–2013), Canadian ice hockey coach
- Wren Kosinski (born 2000), American rapper known as 'Ghost Mountain'
- Wren T. Brown (born 1964), actor, producer, and theatre director
- Wren Zhawenim Gotts (born 2013), American actress
- Wren Hoskyns (1956–2015), British paediatrician
- Wren Howard (1893–1968), British publisher
- Wren Keasler, American actress
- Wren Sinclair (born 1995), American wrestler
- Wren Williams (born 1989), American politician

== Fictional characters ==
- Wren, a scientist from the movie Alien Resurrection
- Wren Elessedil, a character from the Heritage of Shannara series of fantasy novels
- Wren, protagonist of a series of fantasy books by Sherwood Smith
- An android from the video game Phantasy Star III
- An android from the video game Phantasy Star IV
- Wren MacPherson, the third and youngest child of Darryl and Wanda McPherson in the comic strip Baby Blues (comic strip)
- Wren Natsworthy, daughter to Tom and Hester Natsworthy in the last installments of Philip Reeve's Mortal Engines Quartet
- Wren Douglas, a plus-sized model and author in Significant Others, the fifth book in Armistead Maupin's Tales of the City series
- Wren Kingston, from the TV series Pretty Little Liars, played by Julian Morris
- Sabine Wren, from the TV series Star Wars Rebels
- Christopher Wren, in the Agatha Christie play The Mousetrap
- Wren Graves, the child of Andrew and Ashley Graves in The Coffin of Andy and Leyley

== See also ==
- Wrenn (disambiguation)
