= Gun laws in the District of Columbia =

Location of District of Columbia in the United States

Gun laws in the District of Columbia regulate the sale, possession, and use of firearms and ammunition in Washington, D.C.

== Summary table ==
Subject / law	Long guns	Handguns	Relevant statutes	Notes
Permit required to purchase?	Yes	Yes		The firearm registration process also serves as a permitting process. Purchases by DC residents may only be made through a federally licensed dealer ("FFL"), and firearms purchased through an FFL can only be physically delivered to the purchaser after MPD approves the purchase by issuing a firearm registration certificate.
Owner license required?	Yes	Yes		The firearm registration process also serves as a licensing process. In the case of self-manufactured firearms, DC residents have 5 business days to file for a registration certificate after completing the self-manufacture of a firearm.
Firearm registration?	Yes	Yes		All firearms (except certain black powder firearms) must be registered with the Metropolitan Police Department as soon as they are brought into the District; for new purchases the registration must issue prior to the owner taking possession. An NCIC background check, fingerprinting, proof of address, and online training are required.
License required for concealed carry?	N/A	Yes		The Metropolitan Police Department shall issue a Concealed Pistol License to a qualified applicant. Only registered pistols may be carried. Nonresidents must register a pistol with MPD in order to apply for a Concealed Pistol License.
Open carry allowed?	No	No		Open carry is prohibited.
Assault weapon law?	Yes	Yes		Law enforcement evaluates each firearm application on a case-by-case basis to ensure that the firearm is free of certain enumerated “assault” features before approving the firearm registration application.
Magazine capacity restriction?	Yes	Yes		Possession of magazines capable of accepting or "readily restored or converted to accept" more than 10 rounds is prohibited.
NFA weapons restricted?	Yes	Yes		Possession of machine guns, short barreled shotguns, and silencers is prohibited; possession of short barreled rifles is not specifically prohibited but short barreled rifles cannot be registered.
Peaceable journey laws?	No	No		Federal law (FOPA) applies.
Background checks required for private sales?	Yes	Yes	DC Code §7–2505.02	Private party firearm transfers must be conducted through a licensed dealer, who is required by federal law to conduct a background check and keep a record of the sale. As a result of this and applicable federal law, all handgun transfers to DC residents must be conducted by FFLs located inside the District of Columbia. Long guns (shotguns and rifles) may be transferred to DC residents by FFLs located in other states, although DC law requires that those FFLs comply with DC law. Sales made by DC firearms owners to purchasers in other states need only conform to that state's transfer laws, although federal law requires that such transfers be facilitated through an FFL.
Waiting period?	Yes	Yes		After purchasing a firearm, the buyer must receive a registration certificate from the police department before taking possession of the gun, a process which can take up to 90 days. Officially, however, the minimum waiting period is ten days.
Red flag law?	Yes	Yes		
Duty to inform?	Yes	Yes		

== Concealed and open carry ==
A license to carry a handgun is required to legally carry a concealed handgun in the District of Columbia. Licenses are issued to qualified applicants on a "shall issue" basis by the Metropolitan Police Department. Licenses are granted to residents and non-residents. Concealed carry licenses issued by other jurisdictions are not valid in D.C. A license to carry is required for possessing a loaded handgun in a vehicle.

Open carry is not allowed in District of Columbia, except by law enforcement officers, military servicemembers, and security professionals while in the performance of their official duties.

In September 2022, DC, under threat of litigation, repealed code forbidding concealed carry of more than 20 rounds and code forbidding carrying more than two loads total of ammunition.

Under an "Enhanced Penalty Provision" DC law declares that areas within 1,000 feet of a school, college, day care center, playground, library, public housing complex and other public gathering spot to be enhanced penalty zones. The Metropolitan Police Department has clarified that this restriction does not bar persons with concealed carry permits from being within 1,000' of the specified locations, but only acts as a penalty enhancement for gun crimes within 1,000' of those locations.

== Possession of firearms ==
In District of Columbia, all firearms, except some black powder firearms, must be registered with the police, by the terms of the Firearms Control Regulations Act of 1975.

The same law also prohibited the possession of handguns, even in private citizens' own homes, unless they were registered before 1976. However, the handgun ban was struck down by the U.S. Supreme Court in the 2008 case District of Columbia v. Heller. The Supreme Court ruled that the Second Amendment acknowledges and guarantees the right of the individual to possess and carry firearms, and therefore D.C.'s ban on handguns was unconstitutional.

Following the Heller decision, the Council of the District of Columbia enacted a set of rules regulating the possession of handguns and long guns in citizens' homes. Reductions were made to the DC laws in 2012 and 2015 under threat of lawsuits from gun owners and prospective gun owners. On September 18, 2015, a federal appeals court struck down some parts of the District's gun registration law as unconstitutional, while upholding other parts of the law.

In addition to each firearm being registered with the police, the rules require that applicants undergo an NCIC background check and submit to fingerprinting. The firearms registry photographs the applicant. Applicants must take an online gun safety course. Applicants must also declare at what address it will be kept. Each firearm is registered to an individual only, meaning couples who wish to own firearms must purchase two separate firearms. Handgun registrants must be at least 21 years old. Long gun registration is allowed for persons 18–21 years of age with a NCIC qualified adult co-registering. Handgun models are limited to any handgun appearing on any one of the California, Massachusetts, Maryland or DC Police "approved rosters" by make/model. Long guns are controlled by an allowed/not-allowed attributes list. Non-residents with a place of business or employment in DC may register a firearm to be maintained at that place of business or employment.

There is a 10-day waiting period from purchase of a firearm to possession. However, residents must receive a firearm registration certificate issued by the Metropolitan Police Department prior to taking possession. The time period for issuing a firearm registration certificate can be sixty days or greater, typically obviating the statutory waiting period.

== Ammunition ==
An individual may not possess ammunition without also holding a valid firearms registration. Until May 2012, registrants were limited to possessing ammunition of the caliber of their registered weapon only. The ammunition laws in DC were relaxed in May 2012 and valid registration holders may now purchase and transport ammunition of any caliber excepting 50BMG (50 BMG weapons are prohibited in DC) and protective armor penetration ammunition. Interstate sale and shipment of ammunition to valid registration holders is legal. In DC, as in jurisdictions such as Massachusetts, any usable constituent part of ammunition is considered ammunition. E.g. Expended center-fire casings capable of being reloaded are ammunition under current DC police interpretation.

== Air guns ==
It is not lawful for any person to carry or have in his or her possession outside any building in the District an air rifle, air gun, air pistol, B-B gun, spring gun, blowgun, bowgun, or any similar type gun.

== History ==
In June 1976, eighteen months after Congress established home rule for the District, the D.C. Council voted 12 to 1 to restrict city residents from acquiring handguns. Congress attempted to block this in September 1976 but failed.

In February 2003, D.C. was sued in Parker v. District of Columbia for the ban on keeping guns at home. This case eventually morphed into the District of Columbia v. Heller case. In 2007, the D.C. Circuit Court of Appeals found the law unconstitutional. The Supreme Court agreed to hear the case. On June 26, 2008, it ruled the law unconstitutional.

Further challenges ensued in Heller II and Heller III. On October 4, 2011, the D.C. Circuit Court of Appeals, in Heller II, upheld D.C.'s registration requirements and ban on assault weapons and high capacity magazines. The case was sent back to the district court for further proceedings. The case returned to the appeals court as Heller III and on September 18, 2015, the court invalidated the following requirements: (1) re-registration of firearms every three years, (2) not being able to register more than one gun per month, (3) passing a written exam on D.C. gun laws before being allowed to register firearms, and (4) bringing firearms to the registration office for inspection at the time of registration. It also upheld the following requirements: (1) registration of long guns, (2) applicants personally appear at the Firearms Registration Office to be photographed and fingerprinted, (3) applicants view a one-hour gun safety training video in order to register a firearm (DC had, under pressure of the lawsuits, already substituted this free video for the prior $200 mandated live fire training course), and (4) registration and fingerprinting fees.

On July 24, 2014, D.C.'s ban on open and concealed carry was struck down as unconstitutional in Palmer v. District of Columbia. Initially Judge Frederick Scullin, Jr. did not issue a stay of his ruling. For a brief period of time, Judge Scullin's ruling effectively legalized permitless open and concealed carry with a valid firearm registration card, and non-residents without felony convictions could carry openly or concealed in the District. But on July 29, 2014 Scullin issued an order that retroactively stayed the ruling until October 22, 2014. In response to the ruling, a Restrictive May-Issue concealed carry licensing law was enacted in September 2014. Under the new law, an applicant must show "good reason," to qualify for a concealed carry permit. However, on May 18, 2015, the "good reason" requirement was ruled as likely unconstitutional and a preliminary injunction was issued against D.C. from enforcing that requirement in Wrenn v. District of Columbia. This effectively required the District to grant licenses on a Shall-Issue basis to qualified applicants who have passed a criminal background check and completed the required firearms safety training. Judge Scullin did not issue a stay of his ruling, but the Appeals Court did so on June 12, 2015, effectively leaving the restrictive "good reason" requirement in place while litigation continues. It was later ruled that Judge Scullin, a visiting judge from New York, was outside his jurisdiction because he was only appointed to decide the Palmer case, not the follow-up Wrenn case. The Wrenn case was subsequently reassigned to a new judge who denied the request for a preliminary injunction.

On May 17, 2016, a separate case (Grace v. District of Columbia) was decided by District Court Judge Richard J. Leon. The Court issued a preliminary injunction that the "good reason" requirement was likely to be unconstitutional and enjoined its enforcement. The order said that anyone who met the eligibility requirements for a concealed carry license absent the good reason stipulation cannot be denied the license; the order was not stayed originally, but was subsequently stayed on May 27, 2016.

Both the Wrenn and Grace cases were consolidated before the U.S. Court of Appeals in D.C. and oral arguments were held on September 20, 2016. On July 25, 2017, in a 2-1 decision, the court invalidated the "good reason" requirement. The decision was put on hold to allow D.C. to appeal. D.C. filed its appeal for rehearing en banc on August 24, 2017 but its request was denied on September 28, 2017. D.C. declined to appeal to the Supreme Court.
