= The Wren, the Wren =

The Wren, the Wren may refer to:

- The Wren, the Wren, a 2019 EP by Lisa O'Neill
- The Wren, the Wren, a 2023 novel by Anne Enright

== See also ==
- Wren (disambiguation)
