= William J. Thorn =

American runner and coach (1930–2026)

- Born: William Jackson Thorn; September 4, 1930; Birmingham, Alabama, U.S.
- Died: October 21, 2026 (aged 96)
- Occupations: Football coach; Cross country coach; Track and field coach
- Employer: Landmark Christian School (1989–2019)

William Jackson Thorn (September 4, 1930 – October 21, 2026) was an American football, cross country, and track coach. He is believed to be the most successful coach in Georgia history, with 42 state titles. Thorn coached for 65 years, the majority of the time at Landmark Christian School, which he co-founded in 1989. He was inducted into the Georgia Athletic Coaches (GACA) Hall of Fame in 2020. Thorn is also the only runner to have consecutively completed the first 53 Peachtree Road Races, starting with the race's inception in 1970 through 2022.

== Coaching career ==
Thorn coached Georgia High School athletics for over 50 years, including stints at the Georgia Military Academy (now Woodward Academy), Headland High School, Colonial Hills Christian School, Fayette Christian School, and Landmark Christian School. Thorn founded Landmark Christian School in 1989 and retired from coaching in 2019. According to Runner's World, he had coached teams to 42 state championships in football, track and field, and cross country. He is the winningest coach in Georgia history, and at the time of his retirement, he had been awarded "Coach of the Year" over 125 times. He spent the majority of his coaching career at Landmark.

He was inducted into the Georgia Athletic Coaches Association (GACA) Hall of Fame in 2020.

== Peachtree Road Race ==
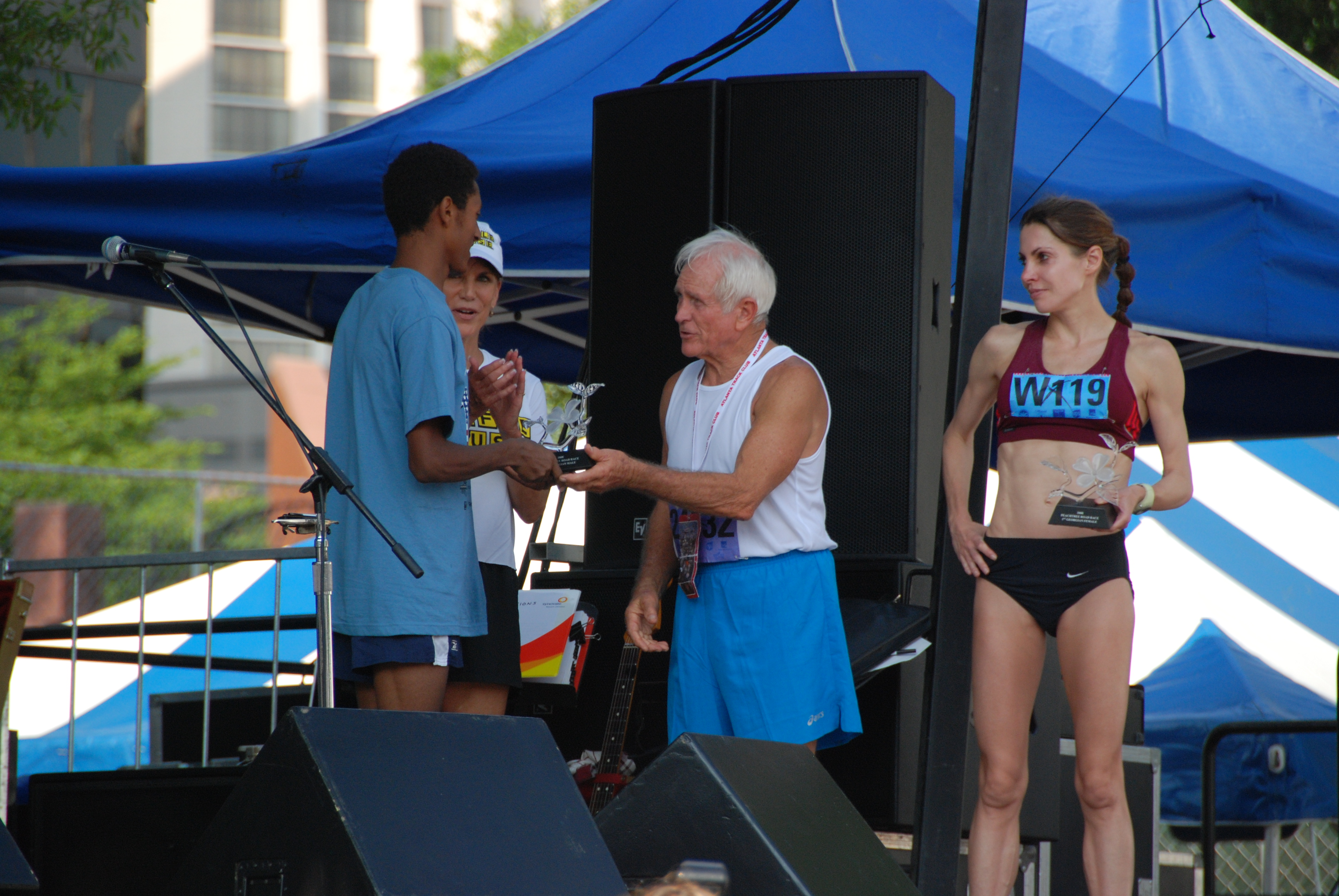
Bill Thorn following the 2008 Peachtree Road Race.

Thorn is only the runner to have consecutively completed the first 53 Peachtree Road Races, starting with the race's inception in 1970 through 2022. The race is the largest 10K run in the world. One of the "Original 110" finishers, Thorn became the last person to have run in every race by 1993. The Atlanta-Journal Constitution dubbed him an "indelible element of this Atlanta institution" and an "ironman", noting his consistent presence amidst decades of change. According to Southern Living, Thorn participated in the race through various injuries, including an "ankle sprain, a heel gash, and... prostate cancer".

When the 2020 edition of the race was postponed due to the COVID-19 pandemic, Thorn held his own 10K race with his family. In June 2021, prior to the 2021 edition of the race, Thorn suffered a fall, which complicated his entry. He completed the race with the assistance of a walker. Thorn competed in his last three races through the race's virtual option, with a route beginning and ending at his home. Thorn chose to retire in 2023, and was honored as the year's grand marshal, with his name engraved on the Peachtree Cup, an honor typically reserved for race champions.

== Personal life and death ==
Born in Birmingham, Alabama, Thorn lived in Tyrone, Georgia, with his wife Patty. He had four children. Thorn was a Christian. He died on October 21, 2026, at the age of 96.
