= Wrenn =

Wrenn may refer to:

== People ==
- Charles Leslie Wrenn (1895–1969), British scholar
- George Wrenn (1865–1948), American tennis player
- George L. Wrenn (1915–1992), American World War II flying ace
- Greg Wrenn, American poet and nonfiction writer
- Heaton Wrenn (1900–78), American rugby union player
- Ralph Wrenn (died 1692), English naval officer
- Robert Wrenn (1873–1925), American tennis player
- Robert Wrenn (golfer) (born 1959), American sportscaster and golf course design consultant
- Suzie Wrenn, American public relations consultant
- Wrenn Schmidt (born 1983), American actor

== Other uses ==
- HMS Wrenn, two Royal Navy ships
- Wrenn School, Wellingborough, Northamptonshire, England. a coeducational secondary comprehensive school and Sixth form with academy status
- Wrenn Peak, Victoria Land, Antarctica
- the title character of Our Mr. Wrenn, a 1914 novel by Sinclair Lewis

== See also ==
- Wrenn v. District of Columbia, an American court case decided in 2017
- G & R Wrenn, model makers
- Wren (disambiguation)
