= Wren (disambiguation) =

Wrens are passerine birds in the family Troglodytidae.

Wren or Wrens may also refer to:

== Other birds ==
- New Zealand wren (Acanthisittidae)
- Maluridae, the Australasian "wrens"
- Acanthizidae subfamily Sericornithinae, the scrubwrens, heathwrens and fernwren

== Buildings ==
- Wren Building, the oldest academic building in the US, at the College of William & Mary, Virginia
- Wren Library, the library of Trinity College in Cambridge
- Wren House, a house on the grounds of Kensington Palace in London

== Military ==
- Members of the British Women's Royal Naval Service, nicknamed "Wrens"
- Members of the Women's Royal Canadian Naval Service, nicknamed "Wrens"
- HMS Wren, two ships of the Royal Navy
- USS Wren, a destroyer that served in World War II

== Music ==
- The Wrens, a band from New Jersey, US formed in the 1980s
- The Wrens (R&B band), a doo-wop singing group from New York City from the 1950s
- Wren (record label), Wales; see Meic Stevens
- "Wren", a song by Tara VanFlower from My Little Fire-Filled Heart, 2005

== Places in the United States ==
- Wren, Alabama
- Wren, Mississippi
- Wren, Ohio
- Wren, Oregon
- Wren, Virginia
- Wrens, Georgia

== Radio stations ==
- WREN (AM), a defunct station (590 AM) licensed to Carrollton, Alabama, US
- WREN-LP, a low-power station (97.9 FM) licensed to Charlottesville, Virginia, US
- KYYS, in Kansas City, Kansas, US, licensed as WREN from 1927 until 1999

== Other uses ==
- Wren (crater), on the planet Mercury
- Wren (name), including lists of people and fictional characters with either the surname or given name
- Rydalmere Cricket Club, New South Wales, Australia, nicknamed The Wrens
- Wren & Martin, a series of English grammar textbooks published in India
- Çalıkuşu, or The Wren, a 1922 novel by Reşat Nuri Güntekin
- Wren, the protagonist of a series of fantasy novels by Sherwood Smith
- Wren Society, a secret society at the College of William & Mary
- English Electric Wren, a 1920s British ultralight monoplane
- Wadebridge Renewable Energy Network
- Wren's Super Wax Shoe Polish, a shoe polish brand existing since 1889
- Wren Kitchens, a British kitchen retailer, designer and manufacturer

== See also ==
- Wrens of the Curragh, nickname given to camp women and prostitutes servicing the British Army in the Curragh Camp in Co. Kildare, Ireland in the 19th century
- Wrenn (disambiguation)
- Ren (disambiguation)
