= Kyle Wren =

American baseball player (born 1991)

- Outfielder
- Born: April 23, 1991 (age 34); West Palm Beach, Florida, U.S.
- Bats: Left Throws: Left
- Stats at Baseball Reference

Kyle Patrick Wren (born April 23, 1991) is an American former professional baseball outfielder. He is the son of the Atlanta Braves' former general manager Frank Wren.

== Amateur career ==
Wren attended Landmark Christian School in Fairburn, Georgia, where he played for the school's baseball team. During his career at Landmark, he had a .455 batting average.

In 2010, Wren enrolled at Georgia Institute of Technology, where he played college baseball for the Georgia Tech Yellow Jackets baseball team. Wren led the Atlantic Coast Conference (ACC) in hits during his freshman year, and earned the titles of All-ACC and freshman All-American during this first year. After the 2011 season, he played collegiate summer baseball with the Cotuit Kettleers of the Cape Cod Baseball League. Once he became eligible for the 2012 MLB draft after his sophomore year, the Cincinnati Reds selected Wren in the 30th round. However, he chose not to sign and instead, returned to Georgia Tech for his junior year. Before the start of the season, the National Collegiate Baseball Writers Association named Wren a preseason All-American. As a junior, Wren had a .360 batting average, and again led the ACC in hits. Following his junior year, Wren was drafted in the 8th round by the Atlanta Braves.

== Professional career ==
Before the 2013 MLB draft, Baseball America ranked Wren as the 210th best available prospect.

=== Atlanta Braves ===
The Atlanta Braves selected Wren in the eighth round, with the 253rd selection. He began his professional career with the Danville Braves of the Rookie-level Appalachian League. After compiling nine hits and stealing three bases in five games for Danville, he was promoted to the Rome Braves of the Single-A South Atlantic League. During his tenure with Rome, Wren had a .328 batting average and 32 stolen bases. This resulted in his second promotion, to the Lynchburg Hillcats of the High-A Carolina League at the end of the season.

Wren split the 2014 season between Lynchburg and the Mississippi Braves of the Double-A Southern League. During the first half of the season, Wren was named to the Carolina League All-Star Team. He and Kyle Waldrop shared most valuable player honors. After the season, Lynchburg named Wren their player of the year. The Braves then assigned Wren to the Arizona Fall League.

=== Milwaukee Brewers ===
The Braves traded Wren to the Milwaukee Brewers on November 14, 2014, in exchange for minor league pitcher Zach Quintana. The Brewers assigned Wren to the Biloxi Shuckers of the Double-A Southern League to start the 2015 season. In June, the Brewers promoted him to the Colorado Springs Sky Sox of the Triple-A Pacific Coast League. Overall for the 2015 season, Wren appeared in 136 games, batting .272 with one home run and 39 RBI.

In 2016, Wren again split time between the Double-A and Triple-A levels, batting a combined .322 with two home runs and 39 RBI in 127 appearances. He spent all of 2017 with the Triple-A Sky Sox, batting .286 with five home runs and 62 RBI in 128 games. Wren started 2018 with the Sky Sox, appearing in 47 games and batting .294 with two home runs and 28 RBI; he was released by the Brewers organization on June 26, 2018.

=== Boston Red Sox ===
On July 3, 2018, Wren signed with the Boston Red Sox, and was assigned to the Triple-A Pawtucket Red Sox. In 37 games for Pawtucket, he hit .230/.308/.318 with one home run and 15 RBI. Wren elected free agency following the season on November 2.

=== Cincinnati Reds ===
On December 7, 2018, Wren signed a minor league contract with the Cincinnati Reds. He was eventually assigned to the Triple–A Louisville Bats, and later released on May 7, 2019 after hitting .220 in 19 games for the Bats.

=== Sioux City Explorers ===
On May 27, 2019, Wren signed with the Sioux City Explorers of the American Association of Independent Professional Baseball. In 91 appearances for Sioux City, Wren slashed .298/.374/.466 with eight home runs, 44 RBI, and 27 stolen bases.

Wren re-signed with the Explorers for the 2020 season; however, the team was not selected by the league to compete in the condensed season due to the COVID-19 pandemic. Wren was not chosen by another team in the dispersal draft, and therefore became a free agent.

== Coaching career ==
From 2019-2021, Wren was an Assistant Coach at his alma mater Georgia Tech.

== Personal ==
Wren's twin brother, Colby, also played at Georgia Tech. Their father, Frank, was formerly the general manager of the Braves. As of January 2021, their youngest brother, Jordan, is currently a free agent, having been released by the Greenville Drive on November 13, 2019.
