= Wayne Talkes =

English footballer (1952–2021)

Personal information
- Full name: Wayne Anthony Norman Talkes
- Date of birth: 2 June 1952
- Place of birth: Ealing, England
- Date of death: 17 April 2021 (aged 68)
- Position: Midfielder

Youth career
- 1967–1972: Southampton

Senior career*
Years	Team	Apps	(Gls)
1972–1974	Southampton	9	(0)
1973	→ Doncaster Rovers (loan)	4	(0)
1974–1975	Bournemouth	5	(0)
- AFC Totton
- Brockenhurst
- Basingstoke Town
- Midanbury
- AC Delco
Total		18	(0)
- * Club domestic league appearances and goals

Wayne Anthony Norman Talkes (2 June 1952 – 17 April 2021) was an English professional footballer who played as a midfielder.

== Career ==
Born in Ealing, Talkes was raised on the Isle of Wight and signed for Southampton in 1967. He made his Reserves debut later that year, becoming the youngest post-war debutant for the Reserves, but did not make his senior debut until the last game of the 1971–72 season. He also played in the Football League for Doncaster Rovers and Bournemouth. He later played in non-league with AFC Totton, Brockenhurst, Basingstoke Town, Midanbury and AC Delco, working for the Post Office and later in marketing, sales, and accounts management.

He died on 17 April 2021, aged 68, leaving behind a wife and two children.
