= Harry Holman (footballer) =

English footballer (1957–2020)

Personal information
- Full name: Harry William Holman
- Date of birth: 16 November 1957
- Place of birth: Exeter, England
- Date of death: 6 November 2020 (aged 62)
- Position: Forward

Youth career
- Chelsea

Senior career*
Years	Team	Apps	(Gls)
1976–1978	Exeter City	52	(9)
1978–1979	Peterborough United	9	(1)
- Exmouth Town

International career
1973	England Schoolboys	1	(0)
- * Club domestic league appearances and goals

Harry William Holman (16 November 1957 – 6 November 2020) was an English professional footballer who played as a forward for Exeter City and Peterborough United in the Football League.

The son of a former Exeter City player, Harry was just one of two people to represent England in football and rugby at the under-15 level. After beginning his career in the Chelsea youth setup, he signed a deal with his hometown club in July 1976, and made his debut a few months later. That year they secured promotion to the Football League Third Division. In August 1978 he requested a transfer, and he made the move to Peterborough United, where he stayed until the end of the season. He moved back to Exeter, and played a few games with local non-league side Exmouth Town.

Holman died on 6 November 2020, aged 62, ten days shy of his 63rd birthday.
