= Jimmy Fletcher =

English footballer (1931–2020)

Personal information
- Full name: James Alfred Fletcher
- Date of birth: 10 November 1931
- Place of birth: Wouldham, England
- Date of death: 22 November 2020 (aged 89)
- Position: Inside forward

Senior career*
Years	Team	Apps	(Gls)
- Wouldham
- Chatham Town
- Faversham Town
- Maidstone United
1957–1958	Gillingham	23	(8)
1958–1959	Southend United	0	(0)
1959–1960	Gravesend & Northfleet		
1960–1962	Dartford		
1962–1963	Margate		
1963–1964	Dover		

International career
	England Amateur	2	(0)
- * Club domestic league appearances and goals

James Alfred Fletcher (10 November 1931 - 22 November 2020) was an English footballer of the 1950s and 1960s, who played professionally for Gillingham and as a semi-professional for various clubs in Kent. After retiring from football he became a successful breeder of racing greyhounds.

== Football career ==
Born in the village of Wouldham in Kent, Fletcher began his career with the local team before joining Chatham Town of the Kent League. He subsequently played for other Kent-based non-league clubs Faversham Town and Maidstone United, where he was a leading goalscorer in the Corinthian League and was twice chosen to play for the England national amateur team.

In 1957 he turned professional with Gillingham of the Football League Third Division South and made his debut in the first game of the 1957–58 season, partnering Ron Saunders in attack. He failed to gain a regular place in the Gills' first team and left the club at the end of the season to join Southend United. He spent six months at Roots Hall but never played for the club's first team. In January 1959 he returned to the non-league scene, joining Gravesend & Northfleet of the Southern Football League, and later played for Dartford, Margate and Dover.

== Post-football career ==
After retiring from football in 1964, Fletcher became a successful breeder of racing greyhounds and went on to win large amounts of money betting on his dogs. His greatest success came in 1991, when his consortium won £200,000 on a high-profile race at Wimbledon Stadium. In 2001, he lived in Sutton Valence near Maidstone and still regularly attended greyhound races.
