= Landmark Christian School =

Coordinates: 33.564789°N 84.580742°W

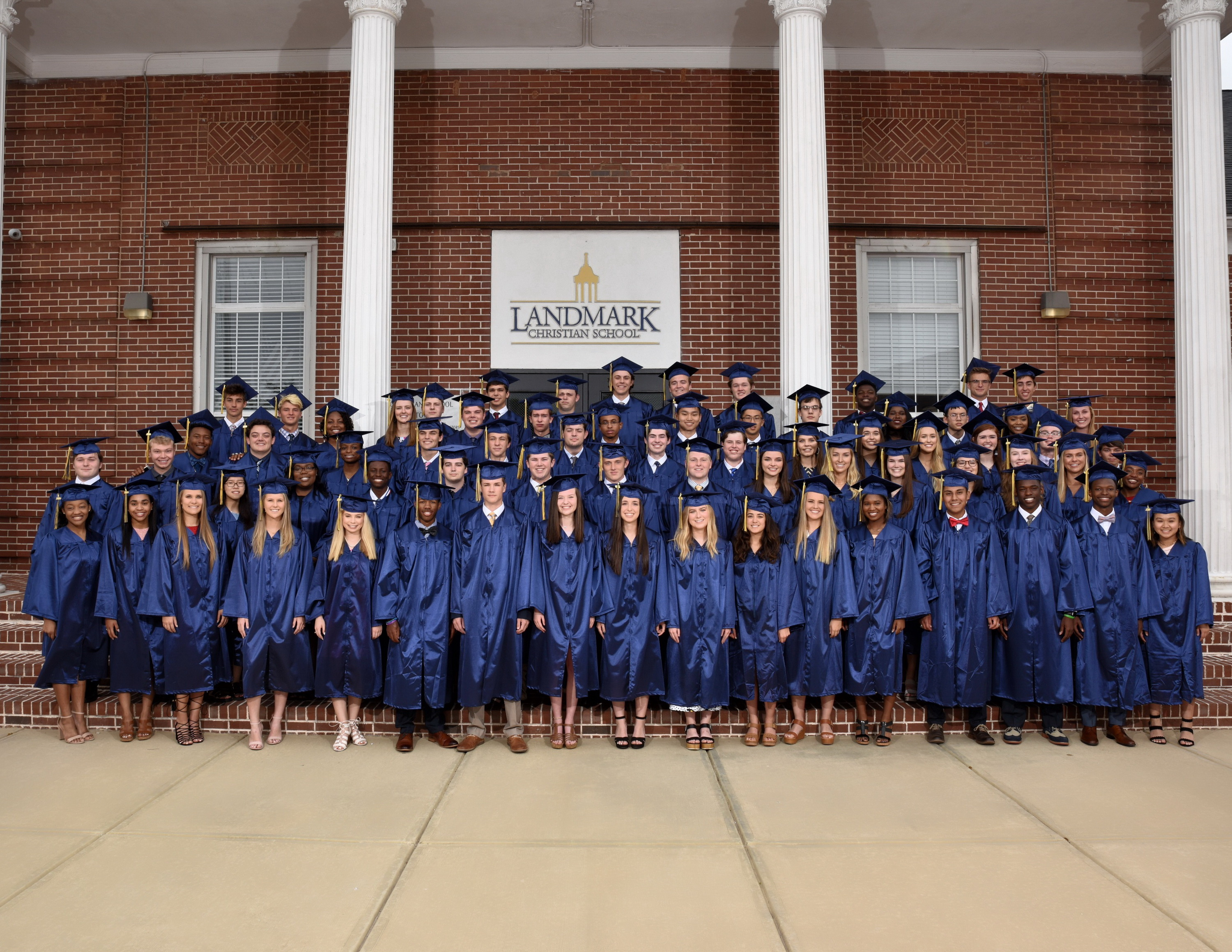
Landmark Christian School Class of 2019

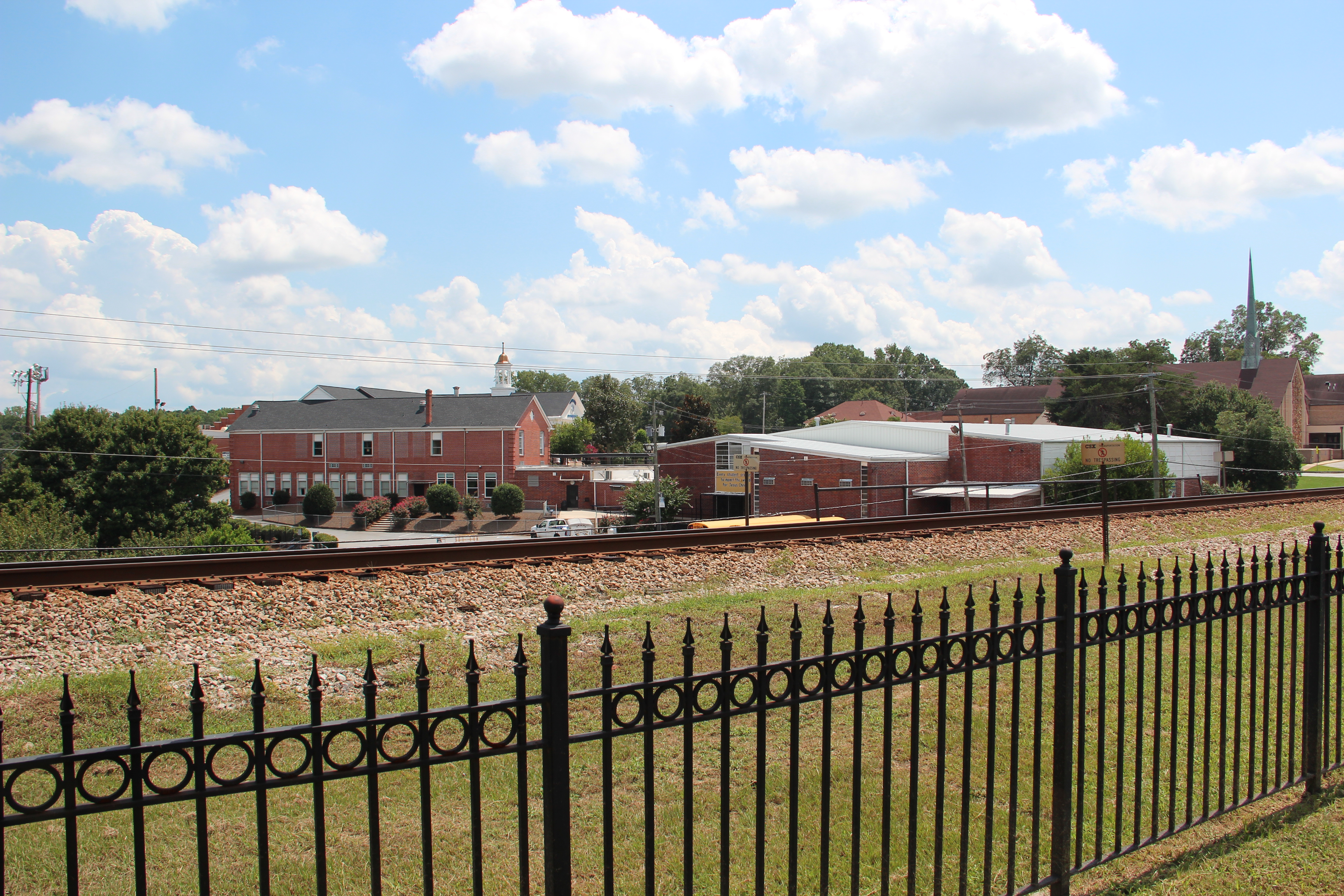
Landmark Christian School

Landmark Christian School is a K-12 private Christian school in the Atlanta metropolitan area in Georgia, United States. It has a main campus in Fairburn, serving students in grades K4 through 12, and a satellite campus in Peachtree City, serving grades K4 through 4.

== History ==
Landmark Christian School opened in the fall of 1989 with 170 students in grades 7 through 12. The original campus was housed in a converted warehouse in Fayetteville, Georgia. In 1991, the school relocated to the former Campbell High School building in Fairburn, where its main campus remains to this day. In 2004, a satellite elementary-only campus was opened in Peachtree City. Today, the school serves more than 930 students from across the southside of Atlanta. A new state-of-the-art high school is planned to open on the Fairburn campus in the fall of 2021.

== Demographics ==
As of 2020–2021, Landmark has 930 students at both the Fairburn campus and the Peachtree City campus. The school is diverse in its population and socioeconomic backgrounds of the students enrolled. The students are primarily from four counties, Douglas, Fayette, S. Fulton, and Coweta. The Landmark community includes students and their families, staff members, teachers, and board members, originating from over 180 churches.

== Notable alumni ==
- Andrew Cathy, CEO of Chick-fil-A
- Maggie Elizabeth Jones, American actress
- Randolph Morris, American former basketball player for the New York Knicks and Atlanta Hawks of the NBA
- Alex Mortensen, American football coach and former quarterback
- Donald Payne, American former football linebacker for the Jacksonville Jaguars of the NFL
- Kyle Wren, American former professional baseball outfielder for the Sioux City Explorers of the American Association of Independent Professional Baseball
