= Peter Gillott =

English footballer (1935–2021)

Personal information
- Full name: Peter Gillott
- Date of birth: 20 July 1935
- Place of birth: Barnsley, England
- Date of death: 23 January 2021 (aged 85)
- Position: Full back

Senior career*
| Years | Team | Apps | (Gls) |
- Worsbrough Bridge Athletic
| 1953–1959 | Barnsley | 5 | (0) |
| 1959–1966 | Chelmsford City | | |
| 1966–1967 | Margate | | |
| 1967–1970 | Chelmsford City | | |
- Old Chelmsfordians

International career
| | England Youth | 8 | (0) |
- * Club domestic league appearances and goals

Peter Gillott (20 July 1935 – 23 January 2021) was an English footballer who played as a full back.

== Career ==
Gillott began his career with Worsbrough Bridge Athletic, before moving to hometown club Barnsley in 1953. Gillott made five Football League appearances at Barnsley over the course of six years, leaving to sign for Chelmsford City in July 1959, being signed by manager Harry Ferrier for a fee of £1,000.

In 1964, Gillott, and fellow Chelmsford stalwart Derek Tiffin, were jointly awarded two testimonials against Swedish club IFK Holmsund and Romford. In May 1966, Gillott signed for Margate, being made club captain on his arrival. Gillott made 64 appearances in all competitions for Margate over the course of a single season, before re-signing for Chelmsford. Upon his return to Chelmsford, Gillott was appointed reserve team manager. On 10 January 1970, Gillott made his final appearance for Chelmsford in a 4–3 FA Trophy loss against Bedford Town. Gillott amassed 376 appearances during his time at Chelmsford, scoring six times, placing him eighth on the club's all-time record appearance makers list.

Following his time at Chelmsford City, Gillott played for Old Chelmsfordians, playing for the club into his fifties.
