= Frank Wren =

American baseball executive (born 1958)

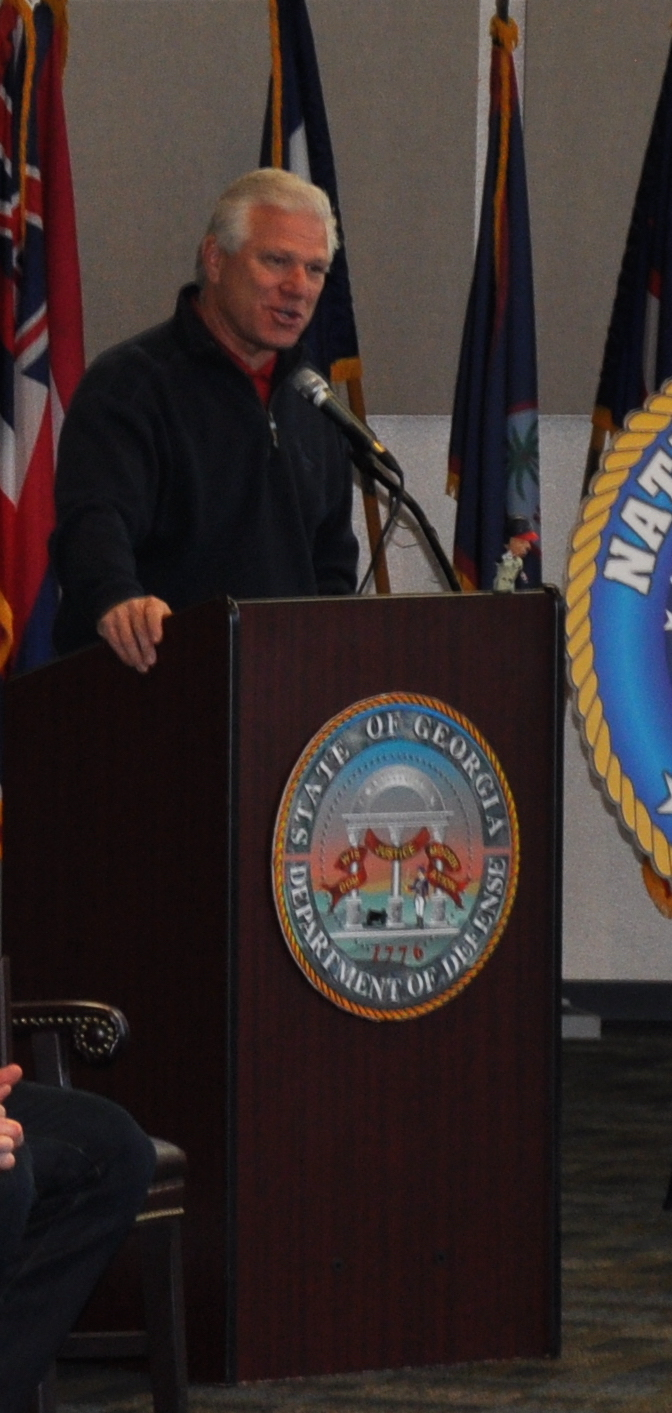
- Wren in 2013
- General manager
- Born: March 17, 1958 (age 68); St. Petersburg, Florida, U.S.
- Stats at Baseball Reference

Teams
- Montreal Expos (1989–1991); Florida Marlins (1993–1998); Baltimore Orioles (1998–1999); Atlanta Braves (1999–2014); Boston Red Sox (2015–2019)

Career highlights and awards
- 2× World Series champion (1997, 2018)

Franklin E. Wren (born March 17, 1958) is an American front office executive in Major League Baseball. He began his baseball career as a minor league player for the Montreal Expos and later joined the team as an executive. Wren moved to the Florida Marlins in 1991, then was hired by the Baltimore Orioles in 1998 for his first stint as a general manager. After the season, Wren was hired by the Atlanta Braves. The Braves promoted Wren to general manager in 2007, a role he kept until 2014. He joined the Boston Red Sox in September 2015.

== Career ==
=== Montreal Expos ===
Wren graduated from Northeast High School in St. Petersburg. He then attended St. Petersburg Junior College and signed with the Montreal Expos as an outfielder in 1977. In five minor league seasons, Wren batted .259 and peaked with a 38-game stint with the Double-A Memphis Chicks in 1980. He accepted a job coaching in the Expos organization in 1981 while recovering from surgery to remove a brain tumor. After trying to resume his playing career in the spring of 1982, Wren became a full-time coach that June with the Jamestown Expos. He joined the front office as general manager of Jamestown in October 1984 and was promoted to assistant director of scouting in September 1985. He was named director of Latin American scouting in 1989.

=== Florida Marlins ===
In September 1991, Wren's boss, Expos GM Dave Dombrowski, accepted the position of GM of the Florida Marlins, a National League expansion franchise set to begin play in 1993, at which Wren followed Dombrowski to the Marlins as the club's assistant GM. By 1996, he was promoted to vice president. In 1997, the veteran-laden Marlins won the franchise's first World Series. In 1998, owner Wayne Huizenga would order his front office to divest the team of its high-priced veterans, and the Marlins spiraled into the basement of the National League East Division.

=== Baltimore Orioles ===
Wren signed a three-year, $1.35 million contract as general manager of the Baltimore Orioles on October 23, 1998. He succeeded Pat Gillick who had left the ballclub when his contract expired earlier that month. However the 1999 Orioles were a major disappointment. The club finished six games under .500 despite one of the highest payrolls in the game and the signing of free agent slugger Albert Belle to the most lucrative contract in team history at the time. His contentious relationship with team owner Peter Angelos began in April when the latter strongly objected to Wren's attempt to dismiss manager Ray Miller. Wren's signings of Mike Timlin and Xavier Hernandez, the latter of which was rescinded and involved a $1.75 million settlement, were criticized by Angelos who alleged that both pitchers had been injured. Wren's dismissal on October 7, 1999 was the result of a September 17 incident when he ordered the Orioles' chartered jet to take off without Cal Ripken Jr. who had phoned the team earlier to inform them he was going to be a few minutes late because he was stuck in traffic. He was succeeded by veteran executive Syd Thrift.

=== Atlanta Braves ===
Wren then joined the Braves as top assistant GM to longtime Atlanta GM John Schuerholz, a position that he held for eight seasons. On October 11, 2007, Schuerholz was named president of the Braves and Wren was promoted to executive vice president and GM, signing a four-year contract.

Wren was known for developing a strong farm system.

Wren was released by the Braves on September 22, 2014, a day after the Braves were eliminated from playoff contention. In his tenure as general manager, Wren made some effective trades to acquire a resurgent Javier Vázquez in 2009, Michael Bourn in 2011, and Justin Upton in 2013. But some free agent signings did not go as well. Derek Lowe was signed to a 4-year, $60 million deal in 2009, but struggled in 2011, before being traded to the Cleveland Indians. Kenshin Kawakami was signed from the Chunichi Dragons of Nippon Professional Baseball in 2009. He spent two years with the Braves and posted an 8-22 record with a 4.32 ERA. Wren traded for Dan Uggla in the 2010 offseason and signed him to a 5-year, $62 million contract. Uggla did well for two years, then slumped before being released in 2014. Melvin Upton joined the Braves on a 5-year, $75.25 million contract in 2013, but struggled through his two-year stint with the team before being traded to the San Diego Padres in April 2015. The money committed to Upton was Wren's most expensive deal.

=== Boston Red Sox ===
The Boston Red Sox named Wren the team's senior vice president of baseball operations on September 25, 2015. He succeeded Mike Hazen, who had been promoted to general manager. Wren won a World Series with the Red Sox in the 2018 season. Wren was dismissed from the Red Sox in September 2019.

== Personal ==
He and his wife Terri have three sons. Jordan was drafted in the tenth round of the 2016 Major League Baseball draft out of Georgia Southern University. Colby is a former Georgia Tech infielder. His twin brother, former Georgia Tech outfielder Kyle Wren, was selected by the Cincinnati Reds in the 30th round of the 2012 MLB draft. In 2013, Kyle was selected by the Atlanta Braves in the eighth round.

Sporting positions
Preceded by Pat Gillick	Baltimore Orioles General manager 1998–1999	Succeeded by Syd Thrift
Preceded by John Schuerholz	Atlanta Braves General manager 2007–2014	Succeeded by John Hart
