= Norman Jukes =

English footballer (1932–2021)

Personal information
- Full name: Norman Geoffrey Jukes
- Date of birth: 14 October 1932
- Place of birth: Leeds, West Riding of Yorkshire, England
- Date of death: 12 February 2021 (aged 88)
- Height: 5 ft 8 in (1.73 m)
- Position: Full-back

Senior career*
Years	Team	Apps	(Gls)
1951–1953	Huddersfield Town	0	(0)
1953–1955	York City	1	(0)
Total		1	(0)
- * Club domestic league appearances and goals

Norman Geoffrey Jukes (14 October 1932 – 12 February 2021) was an English professional footballer who played as a full-back in the Football League for York City, and was on the books of Huddersfield Town without making a league appearance.
