= John Gibbons (footballer) =

English footballer (1925–2021)

Personal information
- Full name: John Ronald Gibbons
- Date of birth: 8 April 1925
- Place of birth: Charlton, England
- Date of death: 31 January 2021 (aged 95)
- Position: Centre forward

Senior career*
Years	Team	Apps	(Gls)
- Dartford
1947–1949	Queens Park Rangers	8	(2)
1949–1950	Ipswich Town	11	(3)
1950–1951	Tottenham Hotspur	0	(0)
- Gravesend & Northfleet
- * Club domestic league appearances and goals

John Ronald Gibbons (8 April 1925 – 31 January 2021) was an English professional footballer who played as a centre forward.

== Career ==
Born in Charlton, Gibbons played for Dartford, Queens Park Rangers, Ipswich Town, Tottenham Hotspur and Gravesend & Northfleet. He served in the British Army during the Second World War.

He died on 31 January 2021, aged 95, from COVID-19 during the COVID-19 pandemic in England. At the time he was Ipswich Town's oldest living player.
