= Thomas Wren =

Thomas Wren is the name of:

- Thomas Wren (footballer) (born 1907), English footballer
- Thomas Wren (Nevada politician) (1824–1904), American Republican politician
- Tommy Wren (born 1976), American Democratic politician in Arkansas
- Thomas Thurston Thomas (born 1948), American science fiction author
- Thomas Wren (priest) (1632–1679), Archdeacon of Ely
