= Tom Docherty =

English footballer (1924–2020)

Personal information
- Date of birth: 15 April 1924
- Place of birth: Penshaw, England
- Date of death: 28 December 2020 (aged 96)
- Position: Left winger

Youth career
- Murton C.W.

Senior career*
Years	Team	Apps	(Gls)
1947–1950	Lincoln City	45	(3)
1950–1953	Norwich City	85	(4)
1953–1955	Reading	53	(2)
1955–1958	Newport County	108	(1)
- King's Lynn
Total		291	(10)
- * Club domestic league appearances and goals

Tom Docherty (15 April 1924 – 28 December 2020) was an English professional footballer. A winger, he joined Newport County in 1955 from Reading and went on to make 108 appearances for Newport, scoring one goal. In 1958 he joined King's Lynn. He died in December 2020 at the age of 96.
