= Wrenn v. District of Columbia =

District

- Court: United States Court of Appeals for the District of Columbia Circuit
- Full case name: Brian Wrenn, etc al., APPELLANTS v. District of Columbia, etc al., APPELLEES
- Argued: September 30, 2016
- Decided: July 25, 2017

Case history
- Appealed from: United States District Court for the District of Columbia

Questions presented
- The individual right to carry common firearms beyond the home for self-defense falls within the core of the Second Amendment’s protections. The District of Columbia's requirement that applicants for concealed carry permits demonstrate a "good reason" infringes an individual's right to bear arms as protected by the Second Amendment.

Court membership
- Judges sitting: Karen L. Henderson, Thomas B. Griffith, Stephen F. Williams

Case opinions
- Majority: Griffith, joined by Williams
- Dissent: Henderson

Laws applied
- The Second Amendment

Wrenn v. District of Columbia, 864 F.3d 650 (D.C. Cir. 2017), is a United States court case in which the United States Court of Appeals for the District of Columbia Circuit held that the "individual right to carry common firearms beyond the home for self defense—even in densely populated areas, even for those lacking special self-defense needs—falls within the core of the Second Amendment’s protections."

This decision struck down the District of Columbia's requirement that applicants for concealed carry permits demonstrate a "good reason," including a "special need for self-protection distinguishable from the general community as supported by evidence of specific threats or previous attacks that demonstrate a special danger to the applicant's life," for carrying a firearm in public.
