= Jackie Wren =

Scottish footballer (1936–2020)

Personal information
- Full name: John Mackie Wren
- Date of birth: 26 April 1936
- Place of birth: Bonnybridge, Scotland
- Date of death: 13 August 2020 (aged 84)
- Position: Goalkeeper

Youth career
- Bo'ness United

Senior career*
Years	Team	Apps	(Gls)
1956–1960	Hibernian	31	(0)
1960–1961	Rotherham United	1	(0)
1961–1962	Stirling Albion	11	(0)
1962–1963	Berwick Rangers	14	(0)
1964–1967	Hellenic	82	(0)
1967–1969	Cape Town City	10	(0)
1970	Hellenic	4	(0)
Total		57	(0)
- * Club domestic league appearances and goals

John Mackie Wren (26 April 1936 – 13 August 2020) was a Scottish footballer who played for Hibernian, Rotherham United, Stirling Albion and Berwick Rangers. He later emigrated to South Africa and played for Hellenic F.C. and Cape Town City.
