= 2020–21 FC Zorya Luhansk season =

FC Zorya Luhansk
2020–21 season
- Chairman: Yevhen Heller
- Head coach: Viktor Skrypnyk
- Stadium: Slavutych-Arena
- Ukrainian Premier League: 3rd
- Ukrainian Cup: Final
- UEFA Europa League: Group stage
- Top goalscorer: League: Oleksandr Hladkyy (10); All: Oleksandr Hladkyy (10)
- Highest home attendance: 4,127 (vs Dynamo Kyiv, 14 March 2021)
- Lowest home attendance: 0
- Average home league attendance: 631
Home colours	Away colours

The 2020–21 season was FC Zorya Luhansk's 98th season in existence and the club's 15th consecutive season in the top flight of Ukrainian football. In addition to the domestic league, Zorya Luhansk participated in this season's editions of the Ukrainian Cup and the UEFA Europa League. The season covers the period from August 2020 to 30 June 2021.

== Players ==
=== Squad information ===
As of 30 June 2021

Squad no.	Name	Nationality	Position	Date of birth (age)
Goalkeepers
23	Nikola Vasilj	(Bosnia and Herzegovina) (Croatia)	GK	2 December 1995 (aged 25)
30	Mykyta Shevchenko	(Ukraine)	GK	26 January 1993 (aged 28)
53	Dmytro Matsapura ^{List B}	(Ukraine)	GK	10 March 2000 (aged 21)
Defenders
5	Agron Rufati ^{List B}	(North Macedonia)	DF	6 April 1999 (aged 22)
6	Leovigildo	(Brazil)	DF	26 December 1995 (aged 25)
15	Vitaliy Vernydub	(Ukraine)	DF	17 October 1987 (aged 33)
17	Vladyslav Yemets	(Ukraine)	DF	9 September 1997 (aged 23)
20	Joel Abu Hanna	(Israel) (Germany)	DF	22 January 1998 (aged 23)
21	Dmytro Ivanisenya	(Ukraine)	DF	11 January 1994 (aged 27)
34	Denys Nahnoynyi ^{List B}	(Ukraine)	DF	3 February 2002 (aged 19)
45	Denys Favorov	(Ukraine)	DF	1 April 1991 (aged 30)
46	Yuriy Dudnyk ^{List B}	(Ukraine)	DF	12 September 2002 (aged 18)
Midfielders
4	Lovro Cvek	(Croatia)	MF	6 July 1995 (aged 25)
7	Vladyslav Kocherhin	(Ukraine)	MF	30 April 1996 (aged 25)
10	Dmytro Khomchenovskyi	(Ukraine)	MF	16 April 1990 (aged 31)
14	Maksym Khlan ^{List B}	(Ukraine)	MF	27 January 2003 (aged 18)
29	Yehor Nazaryna	(Ukraine)	MF	10 July 1997 (aged 23)
28	Artem Hromov	(Ukraine)	MF	14 January 1990 (aged 31)
48	Maksym Kazakov	(Ukraine)	MF	6 February 1996 (aged 25)
50	Serhiy Hryn	(Ukraine)	MF	6 June 1994 (aged 27)
80	Vladlen Yurchenko	(Ukraine)	MF	22 January 1994 (aged 27)
97	Andrejs Cigaņiks	(Latvia)	MF	12 April 1997 (aged 24)
Forwards
8	Maksym Lunyov	(Ukraine)	FW	22 May 1998 (aged 23)
9	Shahab Zahedi	(Iran)	FW	18 August 1995 (aged 25)
11	Oleksandr Hladkyy	(Ukraine)	FW	24 August 1987 (aged 33)
22	Vladyslav Kabayev	(Ukraine)	FW	1 September 1995 (aged 25)
43	Danylo Alefirenko ^{List B}	(Ukraine)	FW	19 April 2000 (aged 21)
47	Raymond Owusu ^{List B}	(Ghana)	FW	20 April 2002 (aged 19)
90	Allahyar Sayyadmanesh ^{List B} (on loan from Fenerbahçe)	(Iran)	FW	29 June 2001 (aged 20)

== Transfers ==
=== In ===
Date	Pos.	Player	Age	Moving from	Type	Fee	Source
Summer
1 August 2020	DF	(Brazil) Leovigildo	24	(North Macedonia) Vardar	Transfer	Undisclosed	
1 August 2020	MF	(Ukraine) Yehor Nazaryna	23	(Belgium) Royal Antwerp	Transfer	Undisclosed	
5 August 2020	FW	(Ukraine) Denys Yanakov	21	(Ukraine) Dynamo Kyiv	Transfer	Undisclosed	
9 August 2020	DF	(Ukraine) Denys Favorov	29	(Ukraine) Desna Chernihiv	Transfer	Free	
7 September 2020	FW	(Ukraine) Oleksandr Hladkyy	33	(Turkey) Adana Demirspor	Transfer	Undisclosed	
21 September 2020	DF	(North Macedonia) Agron Rufati	21	(Croatia) Istra 1961	Transfer	Undisclosed	
6 October 2020	MF	(Ukraine) Serhiy Hryn	26	(Denmark) Vejle	Transfer	Free	
31 July 2020	DF	(Ukraine) Maksym Bilyi	30	(Ukraine) Rukh Lviv	Loan return		
31 July 2020	DF	(Ukraine) Tymofiy Sukhar	21	(Ukraine) Metalurh Zaporizhya	Loan return		
5 August 2020	DF	(Israel) Max Grechkin	24	(Israel) Beitar Jerusalem	Loan		
6 October 2020	FW	(Iran) Allahyar Sayyadmanesh	19	(Turkey) Fenerbahçe	Loan		
Winter
27 January 2021	MF	(Ukraine) Maksym Khlan	18	(Ukraine) Karpaty Lviv	Transfer	Undisclosed	
8 February 2021	FW	(Iran) Shahab Zahedi	25	(Ukraine) Olimpik Donetsk	Transfer	EUR 300Th	
1 March 2021	FW	(Ghana) Raymond Owusu	18	(Ghana) Gold Coast Football Academy	Transfer	Undisclosed	
31 December 2020	DF	(Ukraine) Vladyslav Yemets	23	(Ukraine) Kolos Kovalivka	Loan return		

=== Out ===
Date	Pos.	Player	Age	Moving to	Type	Fee	Source
Summer
31 July 2020	MF	(Ukraine) Maksym Kazakov	24	Unattached	Transfer	Free	
31 July 2020	MF	(Ukraine) Mykyta Kamenyuka	35	Retired	Transfer	Free	
1 August 2020	MF	(Ukraine) Yevhen Cheberko	22	(Austria) LASK	Transfer	Undisclosed	
1 August 2020	MF	(Ukraine) Bohdan Mykhaylychenko	23	(Belgium) Anderlecht	Transfer	Undisclosed	
1 August 2020	FW	(Serbia) Nemanja Ivanović	23	(Serbia) Zlatibor Čajetina	Transfer	Undisclosed	
20 August 2020	DF	(Ukraine) Serhiy Mayboroda	22	(Ukraine) Avanhard Kramatorsk	Transfer	Free	
22 August 2020	DF	(Ukraine) Maksym Bilyi	30	(Ukraine) Rukh Lviv	Transfer	Free	
31 July 2020	DF	(Ukraine) Oleksandr Tymchyk	23	(Ukraine) Dynamo Kyiv	Loan return		
31 July 2020	MF	(Ukraine) Bohdan Lyednyev	22	(Ukraine) Dynamo Kyiv	Loan return		
10 September 2020	GK	(Ukraine) Danylo Khmelovskyi	21	(Ukraine) Metalurh Zaporizhya	Loan		
14 September 2020	MF	(Ukraine) Volodymyr Bilotserkovets	22	(Ukraine) Inhulets Petrove	Loan		
6 October 2020	FW	(Ukraine) Denys Yanakov	21	(Ukraine) Inhulets Petrove	Loan		
Summer
11 January 2021	FW	(Ukraine) Ruslan Skydan	19	(Ukraine) Obolon Kyiv	Transfer	Undisclosed	
14 January 2021	GK	(Georgia (country)) Zauri Makharadze	27	(Ukraine) SC Dnipro-1	Transfer	Undisclosed	
26 January 2021	FW	(Montenegro) Mihailo Perović	27	(Slovenia) Olimpija Ljubljana	Transfer	Free	
4 March 2021	DF	(Ukraine) Ihor Chaykovskyi	29	(Ukraine) Inhulets Petrove	Transfer	Free	
10 February 2021	DF	(Israel) Max Grechkin	24	(Israel) Beitar Jerusalem	Loan return		
21 January 2021	DF	(Ukraine) Maksym Ahapov	20	(Ukraine) VPK-Ahro Shevchenkivka	Loan		
21 January 2021	DF	(Ukraine) Tymofiy Sukhar	21	(Ukraine) VPK-Ahro Shevchenkivka	Loan		
21 January 2021	MF	(Ukraine) Dmytro Piddubnyi	21	(Ukraine) VPK-Ahro Shevchenkivka	Loan		

== Pre-season and friendlies ==
Win Draw Loss

11 August 2020 Friendly	Zorya Luhansk (Ukraine)	2–3	(Ukraine) SC Dnipro-1	Zaporizhia
17:00 EEST (UTC+03:00)	Kocherhin 6'; Yurchenko 56' (pen.)	Report	Dovbyk 41'; Batahov 75'; Yarmolyuk 79'	Stadium: Torpedo Stadium

15 August 2020 Friendly	Zorya Luhansk (Ukraine)	2–1	(Ukraine) FC Mariupol	Zaporizhia
17:00 EEST (UTC+03:00)	Lunyov 11'; Perović 88'	Report	Kulakov 15'	Stadium: Torpedo Stadium

30 August 2020 Friendly	Zorya Luhansk (Ukraine)	3–1	(Ukraine) Inhulets Petrove	Zaporizhia
17:00 EEST (UTC+03:00)	Bilotserkovets 17'; Perović 36'; Yanakov 82'	Report	30'	Stadium: Training facility

5 September 2020 Friendly	Zorya Luhansk (Ukraine)	4–0	(Ukraine) FC Oleksandriya	Zaporizhia
17:00 EEST (UTC+03:00)	Hladkyy 17'; Hromov 25'; Kabayev 32'; Yurchenko 74'	Report		Stadium: Torpedo Stadium

12 January 2021 Friendly	Zorya Luhansk (Ukraine)	2–2	(Poland) Raków Częstochowa	Turkey
16:00 EET (UTC+02:00)	Hromov 56'; Favorov 82' (pen.)	Report	Gutkovskis 54' (pen.); Litwa 66'

15 January 2021 Friendly	Zorya Luhansk (Ukraine)	1–2	(Poland) Piast Gliwice	Turkey
14:30 EET (UTC+02:00)	Yurchenko 86' (pen.)	Report	Huk 6'; Lipski 57'

19 January 2021 Friendly	Zorya Luhansk (Ukraine)	2–2	(Serbia) Vojvodina Novi Sad	Turkey
16:00 EET (UTC+02:00)	Khomchenovskyi 4'; Nazaryna 78'	Report	Zukić 14'; Simić 63'

20 January 2021 Friendly	Zorya Luhansk (Ukraine)	Cancelled	(Serbia) Voždovac	Turkey
EET (UTC+02:00)		Report

25 January 2021 Friendly	Zorya Luhansk (Ukraine)	1–1	(North Macedonia) Shkëndija Tetovo	Turkey
16:00 EET (UTC+02:00)	Khomchenovskyi 28'	Report	Doriev 13'

29 January 2021 Friendly	Zorya Luhansk (Ukraine)	2–1	(Nigeria) MFM	Turkey
16:00 EET (UTC+02:00)	Kabayev 47' (pen.); Lunyov 79'	Report	49' (pen.)

2 February 2021 Friendly	Zorya Luhansk (Ukraine)	0–1	(Latvia) Valmiera	Turkey
16:00 EET (UTC+02:00)		Report	Krollis 29'

6 February 2021 Friendly	Zorya Luhansk (Ukraine)	1–1	(Georgia (country)) Dinamo Tbilisi	Turkey
14:30 EET (UTC+02:00)	Kocherhin 28'; Aliferenko 77'	Report	16'

== Competitions ==
=== Overview ===
Competition	First match	Last match	Starting round	Final position	Record							
Competition	First match	Last match	Starting round	Final position	Pld	W	D	L	GF	GA	GD	Win %
Ukrainian Premier League	22 August 2020	9 May 2021	Matchday 1	3rd	26	15	5	6	44	22	+22	57.69
Ukrainian Cup	16 December 2020	13 May 2021	Round of 16 (1/8)	Final	4	2	1	1	4	3	+1	50.00
Europa League	22 October 2020	10 December 2020	Group stage	Group stage (3rd)	6	2	0	4	6	11	−5	33.33
Total					36	19	6	11	54	36	+18	52.78

Last updated: 13 May 2021
Source: Competitions

=== Ukrainian Premier League ===
==== League table ====
Pos	Team	Pld	W	D	L	GF	GA	GD	Pts	Qualification or relegation
1	Dynamo Kyiv (C)	26	20	5	1	59	15	+44	65	Qualification for the Champions League group stage
2	Shakhtar Donetsk	26	16	6	4	54	19	+35	54	Qualification for the Champions League third qualifying round
3	Zorya Luhansk	26	15	5	6	44	22	+22	50	Qualification for the Europa League play-off round
4	Kolos Kovalivka	26	10	11	5	36	26	+10	41	Qualification for the Europa Conference League third qualifying round
5	Vorskla Poltava	26	11	8	7	37	30	+7	41	Qualification for the Europa Conference League second qualifying round

Source: Ukrainian Premier League
Rules for classification: 1) Points; 2) Head-to-head points; 3) Head-to-head goal difference; 4) Head-to-head higher number of goals scored; 5) Goal difference; 6) Higher number of goals scored; 7) Draw or "Golden match" if two teams tied for title (Article 22, paragraph 3).
(C) Champions

==== Results summary ====
Overall								Home						Away					
Pld	W	D	L	GF	GA	GD	Pts	W	D	L	GF	GA	GD	W	D	L	GF	GA	GD
26	15	5	6	44	22	+22	50	8	3	2	23	10	+13	7	2	4	21	12	+9

Last updated: 9 May 2021.

==== Results by round ====
Round	1	2	3	4	5	6	7	8	9	10	11	12	13	14	15	16	17	18	19	20	21	22	23	24	25	26
Ground	A	H	H	A	A	H	H	A	H	A	A	H	A	H	A	A	H	H	A	A	H	A	H	H	A	H
Result	L	L	D	W	D	D	W	D	D	L	W	W	W	W	W	W	W	L	L	W	W	L	W	W	W	W
Position	10	13	12	9	9	9	8	8	9	9	8	5	4	4	3	3	3	3	3	3	3	3	3	3	3	3

Updated to match(es) played on 9 May 2021. Source:
A = Away; H = Home; W = Win; D = Draw; L = Loss

==== Matches ====
22 August 2020 1	Desna Chernihiv	3–1	Zorya Luhansk	Chernihiv
17:00 EEST (UTC+03:00)	Kalitvintsev (yellow card) 30'; Budkivskyi (yellow card) 49', (goal) 74'; Filippov 56' (pen.); Mostovyi (yellow card) 59'; Tamm 62'; Dombrovskyi (yellow card) 74'; Imerekov (yellow card) 90'	Report	Favorov 43'; Grechkin (yellow card) 76'; Kocherhin (yellow card) 90'	Stadium: Chernihiv Stadium; Attendance: 0 Referee: Dmytro Bondarenko
Note: Match was played behind closed doors due to quarantine in Ukraine during COVID-19 pandemic.

13 September 2020 2	Zorya Luhansk	0–1	FC Mariupol	Zaporizhia
17:00 EEST (UTC+03:00)	Cvek (yellow card) 11'; Abu Hanna (yellow card) 37'; Vernydub (yellow card) 89'	Report	Chobotenko (yellow card) 40'; Kyryukhantsev (yellow card) 58'; Topalov 61'; Ihnatenko (yellow card) 68' (yellow-red card) 86'	Stadium: Slavutych-Arena; Attendance: 0 Referee: Serhiy Boyko
Note: Match was played behind closed doors due to quarantine in Ukraine during COVID-19 pandemic.

20 September 2020 3	Zorya Luhansk	2–2	Shakhtar Donetsk	Zaporizhia
17:00	Kocherhin 20', (yellow card) 90+3'; Yurchenko 28' (pen.); Favorov (yellow card) 72'; Grechkin (yellow card) 81'	Report	Marlos 17', (yellow card) 30'; Kryvtsov (yellow card) 44', (goal) 49'; Stepanenko (yellow card) 57'	Stadium: Slavutych-Arena; Attendance: 2,482; Referee: Vitaliy Romanov

27 September 2020 4	FC Lviv	0–5	Zorya Luhansk	Lviv
14:00 EEST (UTC+03:00)	Klymenchuk (yellow card) 33'; Hrysyo (yellow card) 64'	Report	Yurchenko 3'; Hromov 5', 28'; Hladkyy 33', 37'; Kabayev (yellow card) 33'; Favorov (yellow card) 55'; Cvek (yellow card) 82'; Vernydub (yellow card) 90'	Stadium: Ukraina Stadium; Attendance: 253; Referee: Oleksandr Omelchenko

4 October 2020 5	Dynamo Kyiv	1–1	Zorya Luhansk	Kyiv
17:00 EEST (UTC+03:00)	Sydorchuk (yellow card) 22'; Verbič 74'	Report	Kabayev (yellow card) 16'; Vernydub (yellow card) 20'; Kocherhin 65'	Stadium: NSC Olimpiyskiy; Attendance: 0 Referee: Kateryna Monzul
Note: Match was played behind closed doors due to quarantine in Ukraine during COVID-19 pandemic.

17 October 2020 6	Zorya Luhansk	1–1	Kolos Kovalivka	Zaporizhia
19:30 EEST (UTC+03:00)	Favorov (yellow card) 29'; Kocherhin 44'; Abu Hanna (yellow card) 44'; Yurchenko (yellow card) 46' (yellow-red card) 90+2'; Cvek (yellow card) 59'	Report	Seleznyov 90+3' (pen.)	Stadium: Slavutych-Arena; Attendance: 0 Referee: Anatoliy Abdula
Note: Match was played behind closed doors due to quarantine in Ukraine during COVID-19 pandemic.

25 October 2020 7	Zorya Luhansk	4–0	Rukh Lviv	Zaporizhia
19:30 EET (UTC+02:00)	Khomchenovskyi (yellow card) 6'; Hladkyy 52'; Cvek (yellow card) 62'; Kocherhin 76'; Ivanisenya (yellow card) 84', (goal) 88'; Sayyadmanesh 90+2'	Report	Martynyuk (yellow card) 44' (yellow-red card) 48'; Hahun (red card) 45+3'; Mysyk (yellow card) 55'	Stadium: Slavutych-Arena; Attendance: 0 Referee: Yuriy Ivanov
Note: Match was played behind closed doors due to quarantine in Ukraine during COVID-19 pandemic.

1 November 2020 8	Inhulets Petrove	1–1	Zorya Luhansk	Zaporizhia
19:30 EET (UTC+02:00)	Semenko (yellow card) 27'; Kovalenko (yellow card) 45'; Yanakov 64'; Kvasnyi (yellow card) 70'; Kucherenko (yellow card) 73'; Zaporozhets (yellow card) 80'	Report	Ivanisenya (yellow card) 62'; Yurchenko 75' (pen.); Vernydub (yellow card) 88'	Stadium: Slavutych-Arena; Attendance: 0 Referee: Andriy Kovalenko
Note: Match was played behind closed doors due to quarantine in Ukraine during COVID-19 pandemic.

8 November 2020 9	Zorya Luhansk	0–0	Vorskla Poltava	Zaporizhia
19:30 EET (UTC+02:00)	Yurchenko (yellow card) 15'; Kabayev (yellow card) 24'; Khomchenovskyi (red card) 60'	Report	Rebenok (yellow card) 47' (yellow-red card) 70'; Perduta (yellow card) 50'; Kravchuk (yellow card) 89'	Stadium: Slavutych-Arena; Attendance: 8 Referee: Yevhen Aranovskyi

29 November 2020 11	FC Mynai	0–3	Zorya Luhansk	Uzhhorod
14:00 EET (UTC+02:00)	Holodyuk (yellow card) 14'; Shynder (yellow card) 30'; Nuriyev (yellow card) 89'	Report	Vernydub (yellow card) 13'; Kocherhin 53'; Ivanisenya 59'; Hladkyy 61'	Stadium: Avanhard Stadium; Attendance: 0 Referee: Volodymyr Novokhatniy
Note: Match was played behind closed doors due to quarantine in Ukraine during COVID-19 pandemic.

6 December 2020 12	Zorya Luhansk	3–1	SC Dnipro-1	Zaporizhia
17:00 EET (UTC+02:00)	Hromov 52', 75'; Svatok 85' (o.g.)	Report	Nazarenko 90'	Stadium: Slavutych-Arena; Attendance: 0 Referee: Viktor Kopiyevskyi
Note: Match was played behind closed doors due to quarantine in Ukraine during COVID-19 pandemic.

13 December 2020 13	FC Oleksandriya	0–2	Zorya Luhansk	Oleksandriya
19:30 EET (UTC+02:00)	Dovhyi (yellow card) 35'; Sitalo (yellow card) 60'; Bezborodko (yellow card) 82' (yellow-red card) 83'	Report	Kabayev (yellow card) 3' (yellow-red card) 50'; Hladkyy (yellow card) 4'; Abu Hanna (yellow card) 8'; Ivanisenya 31', (yellow card) 83'; Shevchenko (yellow card) 64'; Sayyadmanesh 90+4'	Stadium: CSC Nika Stadium; Attendance: 0 Referee: Vitaliy Romanov
Note: Match was played behind closed doors due to quarantine in Ukraine during COVID-19 pandemic.

13 February 2021 14	Zorya Luhansk	2–1	Desna Chernihiv	Zaporizhia
14:00 EET (UTC+02:00)	Hladkyy 18', 61'; Abu Hanna (yellow card) 45+1'	Report	Totovytskyi 21'; Imerekov (yellow card) 51'; Ohirya (yellow card) 64'; Konoplya (yellow card) 77'; Budkivskyi (yellow card) 90+2'; Kalitvintsev (yellow card) 90+2'	Stadium: Slavutych-Arena; Attendance: 0 Referee: Anatoliy Abdula
Note: Match was played behind closed doors due to quarantine in Ukraine during COVID-19 pandemic.

20 February 2021 15	FC Mariupol	0–1	Zorya Luhansk	Zaporizhia
14:00 EET (UTC+02:00)	Tankovskyi (yellow card) 60'; Chekh (yellow card) 74'	Report	Zahedi 34', (yellow card) 39'; Hladkyy (yellow card) 50'; Vasilj (yellow card) 90+3'	Stadium: Slavutych-Arena; Attendance: 0 Referee: Volodymyr Novokhatniy
Note: Match was played behind closed doors due to quarantine in Ukraine during COVID-19 pandemic.

27 February 2021 16	Shakhtar Donetsk	0–1	Zorya Luhansk	Kyiv
17:00 EET (UTC+02:00)	Alan Patrick (yellow card) 57'	Report	Nazaryna (yellow card) 32'; Leovigildo (red card) 79'; Ivanisenya 90+4'	Stadium: NSC Olimpiyskiy; Attendance: 4,267; Referee: Kateryna Monzul

7 March 2021 17	Zorya Luhansk	4–0	FC Lviv	Zaporizhia
17:00 EET (UTC+02:00)	Hladkyy 9', 16'; Sayyadmanesh 13', 39'; Vernydub (yellow card) 60'; Kocherhin (yellow card) 78'	Report	Mihoubi (yellow card) 35'; Romanchuk (yellow card) 90'	Stadium: Slavutych-Arena; Attendance: 836; Referee: Ihor Paskhal

14 March 2021 18	Zorya Luhansk	0–2	Dynamo Kyiv	Zaporizhia
17:00 EET (UTC+02:00)	Leovigildo (yellow card) 36'; Ivanisenya (yellow card) 72'; Abu Hanna (yellow card) 83'	Report	Buyalskyi (yellow card) 28'; Besyedin 55'; Sydorchuk 59'; Shepelyev (yellow card) 89'	Stadium: Slavutych-Arena; Attendance: 4,127; Referee: Yuriy Ivanov

21 March 2021 19	Kolos Kovalivka	1–0	Zorya Luhansk	Kovalivka
19:30 EET (UTC+02:00)	Kostyshyn (yellow card) 38'; Lysenko 42'; Zolotov (yellow card) 61'; Volynets (yellow card) 90+3'; Smyrnyi (yellow card) 90+3'	Report	Kocherhin (yellow card) 35'; Nazaryna (yellow card) 50'; Sayyadmanesh (yellow card) 86'	Stadium: Kolos Stadium; Attendance: 0 Referee: Dmytro Kryvushkin
Note: Match was played behind closed doors due to quarantine in Ukraine during COVID-19 pandemic.

3 April 2021 20	Rukh Lviv	0–2	Zorya Luhansk	Lviv
17:00 EEST (UTC+03:00)	Stamenković (yellow card) 4'; Zec (yellow card) 15'	Report	Hromov 8', 60'; Zahedi (yellow card) 16'; Ivanisenya (yellow card) 38' (yellow-red card) 82'; Yurchenko (yellow card) 63'	Stadium: Arena Lviv; Attendance: 0 Referee: Yuriy Ivanov
Note: Match was played behind closed doors due to quarantine in Ukraine during COVID-19 pandemic.

11 April 2021 21	Zorya Luhansk	2–0	Inhulets Petrove	Kropyvnytskyi
14:00 EEST (UTC+03:00)	Hromov (yellow card) 16'; Kabayev (yellow card) 44'; Yurchenko 51'; Hladkyy (yellow card) 55'; Leovigildo 66'	Report	Chaykovskyi (yellow card) 23'; Shyshka (yellow card) 61'; Balan (yellow card) 63'	Stadium: Zirka Stadium; Attendance: 0 Referee: Dmytro Kryvushkin
Note: Match was played behind closed doors due to quarantine in Ukraine during COVID-19 pandemic.

17 April 2021 22	Vorskla Poltava	4–2	Zorya Luhansk	Poltava
17:00 EEST (UTC+03:00)	Stepanyuk 8'; Kulach 24', 33', 49'; Yakubu (yellow card) 48'	Report	Cvek (yellow card) 9'; Zahedi (yellow card) 34'; Vernydub (yellow card) 40'; Khomchenovskyi (yellow card) 62'; Hladkyy 79'; Leovigildo (yellow card) 83'; Favorov 90+3'	Stadium: Vorskla Stadium; Attendance: 0 Referee: Yevhen Aranovskyi
Note: Match was played behind closed doors due to quarantine in Ukraine during COVID-19 pandemic.

25 April 2021 23	Zorya Luhansk	2–1	Olimpik Donetsk	Zaporizhia
14:00 EEST (UTC+03:00)	Yurchenko 12' (pen.); Kabayev (yellow card) 23'; Favorov (yellow card) 53'; Zahedi 71'	Report	Ekra (yellow card) 33'; Kargbo 54' (pen.)	Stadium: Slavutych-Arena; Attendance: 0 Referee: Maksym Kozyryatskyi
Note: Match was played behind closed doors due to quarantine in Ukraine during COVID-19 pandemic.

28 April 2021 10	Olimpik Donetsk	2–1	Zorya Luhansk	Chernihiv
17:00 EEST (UTC+03:00)	Kargbo (yellow card) 18'; Talles (yellow card) 44'; Babenko (yellow card) 45+3', (goal) 53'; Veklyak (yellow card) 48'; Do Couto 72'; Kychak (yellow card) 90+1'	Report	Vasilj (red card) 32'; Khomchenovskyi (yellow card) 45+2'; Kocherhin (yellow card) 70'; Rufati (yellow card) 89'; Sayyadmanesh 90+2', (yellow card) 90+2'	Stadium: Chernihiv Stadium; Attendance: 0 Referee: Mykola Balakin
Note: Match was played behind closed doors due to quarantine in Ukraine during COVID-19 pandemic.

2 May 2021 24	Zorya Luhansk	1–0	FC Mynai	Zaporizhia
17:00 EEST (UTC+03:00)	Hladkyy (yellow card) 1'; Favorov (yellow card) 20'; Nazaryna (yellow card) 49'; Sayyadmanesh (yellow card) 63'; Kabayev (yellow card) 77'; Kocherhin 81'	Report	Pynyashko (yellow card) 43'; Petrusenko (yellow card) 71'; Tkachuk (yellow card) 87'; Knysh (yellow card) 90+2'	Stadium: Slavutych-Arena; Attendance: 0 Referee: Vitaliy Romanov
Note: Match was played behind closed doors due to quarantine in Ukraine during COVID-19 pandemic.

5 May 2021 25	SC Dnipro-1	0–1	Zorya Luhansk	Dnipro
19:00 EEST (UTC+03:00)	Dubinchak (yellow card) 13'; Douglas (yellow card) 45+2'; Ihnatenko (red card) 69'; Di Franco (yellow card) 86'; Lucas Taylor (yellow card) 90+1'	Report	Ivanisenya (yellow card) 40'; Vernydub (yellow card) 44'; Yurchenko 79' (pen.); Sayyadmanesh (yellow card) 85'	Stadium: Dnipro-Arena; Attendance: 0 Referee: Dmytro Kryvushkin
Note: Match was played behind closed doors due to quarantine in Ukraine during COVID-19 pandemic.

9 May 2021 26	Zorya Luhansk	2–1	FC Oleksandriya	Zaporizhia
14:00 EEST (UTC+03:00)	Rufati (yellow card) 33'; Hladkyy 63'; Alefirenko 73'; Zahedi (yellow card) 80'	Report	Kovalets (yellow card) 27'; Hrechyshkin (yellow card) 45'; Melnyk (yellow card) 50'; Novikov 86'	Stadium: Slavutych-Arena; Attendance: 762; Referee: Oleksandr Solovyan

=== Ukrainian Cup ===
16 December 2020 Round of 16 (1/8)	Desna Chernihiv	0–1	Zorya Luhansk	Kyiv
14:00 EET (UTC+02:00)	Konoplya (yellow card) 53'; Past (yellow card) 88'; Hutsulyak (yellow card) 88' (yellow-red card) 89'	Report	Yurchenko 16' (pen.), (red card) 58'; Shevchenko (yellow card) 81'; Abu Hanna (yellow card) 88'	Stadium: Dynamo Stadium; Attendance: 0 Referee: Denys Shurman

3 March 2021 Quarter-final	Veres Rivne	1–2	Zorya Luhansk	Lutsk
14:00 EET (UTC+02:00)	Panasenko (yellow card) 7' (yellow-red card) 77'; Shestakov 18' (pen.); Dakhnovskyi (yellow card) 30'	Report	Rufati (yellow card) 20'; Ivanisenya 25'; Kocherhin 59'; Abu Hanna (yellow card) 80'; Sayyadmanesh (yellow card) 90+5'	Stadium: Avanhard Stadium; Attendance: 2,042; Referee: Maksym Kozyryatskyi

21 April 2021 Semifinal	FC Oleksandriya	1–1 (3 – 4 p)	Zorya Luhansk	Oleksandriya
18:30 EEST (UTC+03:00)	Bondarenko (yellow card) 63', (goal) 90+2' (pen.)	Report	Kocherhin (yellow card) 7', (goal) 20'; Ivanisenya (yellow card) 60'; Hladkyy (yellow card) 62'; Cigaņiks (yellow card) 79'; Vernydub (yellow card) 111'	Stadium: CSC Nika Stadium; Attendance: 0 Referee: Ihor Paskhal
	Penalties
	Shastal (penalty scored); Bondarenko (penalty scored); Myshenko (penalty scored); Dubra (penalty missed); Stetskov (penalty missed)		Nazaryna (penalty scored); Zahedi (penalty scored); Ivanisenya (penalty missed); Yurchenko (penalty scored); Favorov (penalty scored)

13 May 2021 Final	Dynamo Kyiv	1–0	Zorya Luhansk	Ternopil
19:00 EEST (UTC+03:00)	Shaparenko (yellow card) 35'; Kędziora (yellow card) 67'; Sydorchuk (yellow card) 90+3'; Tsyhankov 98'	Report	Vernydub (yellow card) 14'; Yurchenko (yellow card) 52'; Kocherhin (yellow card) 76'; Sayyadmanesh (yellow card) 90+3'; Leovigildo (yellow card) 90+4'; Ivanisenya (yellow card) 111'	Stadium: Ternopil city stadium Attendance: 3,000; Referee: Yuriy Ivanov

=== UEFA Europa League ===
==== Group stage ====
The group stage draw was held on 2 October 2020.

Pos	Team	Pld	W	D	L	GF	GA	GD	Pts	Qualification	LEI	BRA	ZOR	AEK
1	(England) Leicester City	6	4	1	1	14	5	+9	13 (Note: Head-to-head points: Leicester City 4, Braga 1.)	Advance to knockout phase	—	4–0	3–0	2–0
2	(Portugal) Braga	6	4	1	1	14	10	+4	13	Advance to knockout phase	3–3	—	2–0	3–0
3	(Ukraine) Zorya Luhansk	6	2	0	4	6	11	−5	6		1–0	1–2	—	1–4
4	(Greece) AEK Athens	6	1	0	5	7	15	−8	3		1–2	2–4	0–3	—

Source: UEFA
Rules for classification: Group stage tiebreakers
Notes:

22 October 2020 1	Leicester City (England)	3–0	(Ukraine) Zorya Luhansk	Leicester
22:00 EEST (UTC+03:00)	Tielemans (yellow card) 12'; Maddison 29'; Barnes 45'; Iheanacho 67'	Report	Kabayev (yellow card) 22'; Vernydub (yellow card) 77'	Stadium: King Power Stadium; Referee: Stéphanie Frappart (France)

29 October 2020 2	Zorya Luhansk (Ukraine)	1–2	(Portugal) Braga	Zaporizhia
19:55 EET (UTC+02:00)	Kocherhin (yellow card) 35'; Kabayev (yellow card) 47'; Ivanisenya 90+6'	Report	Paulinho 4'; Gaitán 11'; Carmo (yellow card) 29'; Fransérgio (yellow card) 78'; Raul Silva (yellow card) 85'	Stadium: Slavutych-Arena; Attendance: 853; Referee: Giorgi Kruashvili (Georgia)

5 November 2020 3	Zorya Luhansk (Ukraine)	1–4	(Greece) AEK Athens	Zaporizhia
22:00 EET (UTC+02:00)	Vernydub (yellow card) 66'; Kocherhin 81'	Report	Tanković 7'; Mantalos (yellow card) 30', (goal) 34'; Livaja 54', 81'; Ansarifard (yellow card) 77'; Insúa (yellow card) 87'	Stadium: Slavutych-Arena; Attendance: 0 Referee: Willie Collum

26 November 2020 4	AEK Athens (Greece)	0–3	(Ukraine) Zorya Luhansk	Athens
19:55 EET (UTC+02:00)	Shakhov (yellow card) 43' (yellow-red card) 49'; Tanković (yellow card) 49'; Simões (yellow card) 55'; Svarnas (yellow card) 70'	Report	Vernydub (yellow card) 49'; Hromov 61'; Kocherhin (yellow card) 74'; Kabayev 76'; Yurchenko 86' (pen.)	Stadium: Olympic Stadium; Attendance: 0 Referee: Aliyar Aghayev (Azerbaijan)

3 December 2020 5	Zorya Luhansk (Ukraine)	1–0	(England) Leicester City	Zaporizhia
19:55 EET (UTC+02:00)	Cigaņiks (yellow card) 32'; Nazaryna (yellow card) 74'; Sayyadmanesh 84'	Report	Pereira (yellow card) 42'; Iheanacho (yellow card) 45+1'; Mendy (yellow card) 58'; Fofana (yellow card) 87'	Stadium: Slavutych-Arena; Attendance: 0 Referee: Espen Eskås (Norway)

10 December 2020 6	Braga (Portugal)	2–0	(Ukraine) Zorya Luhansk	Braga
22:00 EET (UTC+02:00)	Abu Hanna 61' (o.g.); Horta 68'	Report		Stadium: Estádio Municipal; Attendance: 0 Referee: Daniel Stefański (Poland)

== Statistics ==
=== Appearances and goals ===
No.	Pos	Nat	Player	Total		Premier League		Cup		EL	
No.	Pos	Nat	Player	Apps	Goals	Apps	Goals	Apps	Goals	Apps	Goals
Goalkeepers
23	GK	(Bosnia and Herzegovina) BIH	Nikola Vasilj	21	0	15+1	0	3	0	2	0
30	GK	(Ukraine) UKR	Mykyta Shevchenko	15	0	8+1	0	1+1	0	4	0
53	GK	(Ukraine) UKR	Dmytro Matsapura	3	0	3	0	0	0	0	0
Defenders
5	DF	(North Macedonia) MKD	Agron Rufati	12	0	4+6	0	1	0	0+1	0
6	DF	(Brazil) BRA	Leovigildo	14	1	10+3	1	1	0	0	0
15	DF	(Ukraine) UKR	Vitaliy Vernydub	26	0	19+1	0	2	0	4	0
17	DF	(Ukraine) UKR	Vladyslav Yemets	2	0	0+1	0	0+1	0	0	0
20	DF	(Israel) ISR	Joel Abu Hanna	27	0	20	0	2	0	4+1	0
34	DF	(Ukraine) UKR	Denys Nahnoynyi	1	0	0+1	0	0	0	0	0
45	DF	(Ukraine) UKR	Denys Favorov	29	2	19+1	2	3	0	5+1	0
46	DF	(Ukraine) UKR	Yuriy Dudnyk	1	0	0+1	0	0	0	0	0
Midfielders
4	MF	(Croatia) CRO	Lovro Cvek	18	0	9+5	0	0+2	0	2	0
7	MF	(Ukraine) UKR	Vladyslav Kocherhin	33	9	23	6	4	2	6	1
10	MF	(Ukraine) UKR	Dmytro Khomchenovskyi	25	0	15+4	0	1+1	0	3+1	0
21	MF	(Ukraine) UKR	Dmytro Ivanisenya	31	6	17+4	4	4	1	6	1
28	MF	(Ukraine) UKR	Artem Hromov	23	7	14+2	6	2+1	0	4	1
29	MF	(Ukraine) UKR	Yehor Nazaryna	34	0	16+9	0	3	0	4+2	0
48	MF	(Ukraine) UKR	Maksym Kazakov	4	0	1+3	0	0	0	0	0
50	MF	(Ukraine) UKR	Serhiy Hryn	9	0	1+5	0	0	0	0+3	0
80	MF	(Ukraine) UKR	Vladlen Yurchenko	33	8	22+1	6	4	1	6	1
97	MF	(Latvia) LAT	Andrejs Cigaņiks	25	0	11+6	0	3	0	4+1	0
Forwards
8	FW	(Ukraine) UKR	Maksym Lunyov	21	0	6+7	0	1+2	0	3+2	0
9	FW	(Iran) IRI	Shahab Zahedi	14	2	5+7	2	0+2	0	0	0
11	FW	(Ukraine) UKR	Oleksandr Hladkyy	31	10	18+4	10	2+1	0	3+3	0
22	FW	(Ukraine) UKR	Vladyslav Kabayev	29	1	17+2	0	4	0	6	1
43	FW	(Ukraine) UKR	Danylo Alefirenko	3	1	0+3	1	0	0	0	0
47	FW	(Ghana) GHA	Raymond Owusu	1	0	0+1	0	0	0	0	0
90	FW	(Iran) IRI	Allahyar Sayyadmanesh	27	6	11+8	5	3+1	0	0+4	1
Players transferred out during the season
3	DF	(Israel) ISR	Max Grechkin	3	0	2+1	0	0	0	0	0
9	FW	(Montenegro) MNE	Mihailo Perović	15	0	0+9	0	0+1	0	0+5	0
14	FW	(Ukraine) UKR	Denys Yanakov	2	0	0+2	0	0	0	0	0
17	DF	(Ukraine) UKR	Ihor Chaykovskyi	2	0	0+2	0	0	0	0	0
47	MF	(Ukraine) UKR	Dmytro Piddubnyi	3	0	0+2	0	0	0	0+1	0

Source: Competitions

Last updated: 13 May 2021

=== Goalscorers ===
Rank	No.	Pos	Nat	Name	Premier League	Cup	Europa League	Total
1	11	FW	(Ukraine)	Oleksandr Hladkyy	10	0	0	10
2	7	MF	(Ukraine)	Vladyslav Kocherhin	6	2	1	9
3	80	MF	(Ukraine)	Vladlen Yurchenko	6	1	1	8
4	28	MF	(Ukraine)	Artem Hromov	6	0	1	7
5	21	MF	(Ukraine)	Dmytro Ivanisenya	4	1	1	6
5	90	FW	(Iran)	Allahyar Sayyadmanesh	5	0	1	6
7	9	FW	(Iran)	Shahab Zahedi	2	0	0	2
7	45	DF	(Ukraine)	Denys Favorov	2	0	0	2
9	6	DF	(Brazil)	Leovigildo	1	0	0	1
9	22	FW	(Ukraine)	Vladyslav Kabayev	0	0	1	1
9	43	FW	(Ukraine)	Danylo Alefirenko	1	0	0	1
				Own goal	1	0	0	1
				Total	44	4	6	54

Last updated: 13 May 2021

=== Clean sheets ===
Rank	No.	Pos	Nat	Name	Premier League	Cup	Europa League	Total
1	23	GK	(Bosnia and Herzegovina)	Nikola Vasilj	8	0	1	9
1	30	GK	(Ukraine)	Mykyta Shevchenko	2	1	1	4
1	53	GK	(Ukraine)	Dmytro Matsapura	3	0	0	3
				Total	13	1	2	16

Last updated: 13 May 2021

=== Disciplinary record ===
No.	Pos	Nat	Player	Premier League			Cup			Europa League			Total		
No.	Pos	Nat	Player	Booked	(yellow card) (yellow-red card)	Sent off (straight red)	Booked	(yellow card) (yellow-red card)	Sent off (straight red)	Booked	(yellow card) (yellow-red card)	Sent off (straight red)	Booked	(yellow card) (yellow-red card)	Sent off (straight red)
3	DF	(Israel)	Max Grechkin	2	0	0	0	0	0	0	0	0	2	0	0
4	MF	(Croatia)	Lovro Cvek	5	0	0	0	0	0	0	0	0	5	0	0
5	DF	(North Macedonia)	Agron Rufati	2	0	0	0	0	0	0	0	0	2	0	0
6	DF	(Brazil)	Leovigildo	2	0	1	1	0	0	0	0	0	3	0	1
7	MF	(Ukraine)	Vladyslav Kocherhin	5	0	0	2	0	0	2	0	0	9	0	0
9	FW	(Iran)	Shahab Zahedi	4	0	0	0	0	0	0	0	0	4	0	0
10	MF	(Ukraine)	Dmytro Khomchenovskyi	3	0	1	0	0	0	0	0	0	3	0	1
11	FW	(Ukraine)	Oleksandr Hladkyy	4	0	0	1	0	0	0	0	0	5	0	0
15	DF	(Ukraine)	Vitaliy Vernydub	8	0	0	2	0	0	3	0	0	13	0	0
18	MF	(Ukraine)	Artem Hromov	1	0	0	0	0	0	0	0	0	1	0	0
20	DF	(Israel)	Joel Abu Hanna	5	0	0	1	0	0	0	0	0	6	0	0
21	MF	(Ukraine)	Dmytro Ivanisenya	5	1	0	2	0	0	0	0	0	7	1	0
22	FW	(Ukraine)	Vladyslav Kabayev	6	1	0	0	0	0	2	0	0	8	1	0
23	GK	(Bosnia and Herzegovina)	Nikola Vasilj	1	0	1	0	0	0	0	0	0	1	0	1
27	MF	(Ukraine)	Yehor Nazaryna	3	0	0	0	0	0	1	0	0	4	0	0
30	GK	(Ukraine)	Mykyta Shevchenko	1	0	0	1	0	0	0	0	0	2	0	0
45	DF	(Ukraine)	Denys Favorov	5	0	0	0	0	0	0	0	0	5	0	0
80	MF	(Ukraine)	Vladlen Yurchenko	2	1	0	1	0	1	0	0	0	3	1	1
90	FW	(Iran)	Allahyar Sayyadmanesh	4	0	0	1	0	0	0	0	0	5	0	0
97	MF	(Latvia)	Andrejs Cigaņiks	0	0	0	1	0	0	1	0	0	2	0	0
			Total	68	3	3	13	0	1	9	0	0	90	3	4

Last updated: 13 May 2021

=== Attendances ===
	Matches	Attendances	Average	High	Low
Premier League	13	8,215	631	4,127	0
Cup	0	0	0	0	0
Europa League	3	853	284	853	0
Total	16	9,068	566	4,127	0

Last updated: 13 May 2021
