= 2020–21 UEFA Europa League group stage =

2020 football competition

The 2020–21 UEFA Europa League group stage began on 22 October 2020 and ended on 10 December 2020. A total of 48 teams competed in the group stage to decide 24 of the 32 places in the knockout phase of the 2020–21 UEFA Europa League.

Antwerp, Granada, Leicester City, Omonia and Sivasspor made their debut appearances in the group stage.

== Draw ==
The draw for the group stage was held on 2 October 2020, 13:00 CEST, at the House of European Football in Nyon, Switzerland.

In the case of associations with two or more representatives, clubs could be paired so that they played with different kick-off times (18.55 CET and 21:00 CET) for the benefit of TV audiences. If a paired club was drawn, for example, in groups A, B, C, D, E or F the other paired club – once drawn – would automatically be assigned to the first available group of G, H, I, J, K or L. The following pairings were announced by UEFA after the group stage teams were confirmed:

1. (England) Arsenal and Tottenham Hotspur
2. (Italy) Napoli and Milan
3. (Portugal) Benfica and Braga
4. (Germany) Bayer Leverkusen and TSG Hoffenheim
5. (Spain) Villarreal and Real Sociedad
6. (Belgium) Gent and Standard Liège
7. (Netherlands) PSV Eindhoven and Feyenoord
8. (Scotland) Celtic and Rangers
9. (Croatia) Dinamo Zagreb and Rijeka
10. (Czech Republic) Sparta Prague and Slavia Prague
11. (Bulgaria) Ludogorets Razgrad and CSKA Sofia
12. (Austria) Rapid Wien and LASK
13. (Greece) PAOK and AEK Athens
14. (Israel) Maccabi Tel Aviv and Hapoel Be'er Sheva
15. (France) Lille and Nice

On each matchday, one set of six groups played their matches at 18:55 CET/CEST, while the other set of six groups played their matches at 21:00 CET/CEST, with the two sets of groups alternating between each matchday. The fixtures were decided after the draw, using a computer draw not shown to public, with the following match sequence (Regulations Article 15.02):

On 17 July 2014, the UEFA emergency panel ruled that Ukrainian and Russian clubs would not be drawn against each other "until further notice" due to the political unrest between the countries.

Group stage schedule
Matchday	Dates
Matchday 1	22 October 2020
Matchday 2	29 October 2020
Matchday 3	5 November 2020
Matchday 4	26 November 2020
Matchday 5	3 December 2020
Matchday 6	10 December 2020

There were scheduling restrictions: for example, teams from the same city (e.g. Celtic & Rangers, Arsenal & Tottenham Hotspur, Sparta Prague & Slavia Prague) in general were not scheduled to play at home on the same matchday (to avoid them playing at home on the same day, due to logistics and crowd control), and teams from "winter countries" (e.g. Russia) were not scheduled to play at home on the last matchday (due to cold weather).

== Teams ==
Below were the participating teams (with their 2020 UEFA club coefficients), grouped by their seeding pot. They included:

- 18 teams which entered in the group stage
- 21 winners of the play-off round (8 from Champions Path, 13 from Main Path)
- 6 losers of the Champions League play-off round (4 from Champions Path, 2 from League Path)
- 3 League Path losers of the Champions League third qualifying round

Key to colours
Group winners and runners-up advanced to round of 32

Pot 1
Team	Notes	Coeff.
(England) Arsenal		91.000
(England) Tottenham Hotspur		85.000
(Italy) Roma		80.000
(Italy) Napoli		77.000
(Portugal) Benfica		70.000
(Germany) Bayer Leverkusen		61.000
(Spain) Villarreal		56.000
(Russia) CSKA Moscow		44.000
(Portugal) Braga		41.000
(Belgium) Gent		39.500
(Netherlands) PSV Eindhoven		37.000
(Scotland) Celtic		34.000

Pot 2
Team	Notes	Coeff.
(Croatia) Dinamo Zagreb		33.500
(Czech Republic) Sparta Prague		30.500
(Czech Republic) Slavia Prague		27.500
(Bulgaria) Ludogorets Razgrad		26.000
(Switzerland) Young Boys		25.500
(Serbia) Red Star Belgrade		22.750
(Austria) Rapid Wien		22.000
(England) Leicester City		22.000
(Greece) PAOK		21.000
(Azerbaijan) Qarabağ		21.000
(Belgium) Standard Liège		20.500
(Spain) Real Sociedad		20.456

Pot 3
Team	Notes	Coeff.
(Spain) Granada		20.456
(Italy) Milan		19.000
(Netherlands) AZ		18.500
(Netherlands) Feyenoord		17.000
(Israel) Maccabi Tel Aviv		16.500
(Greece) AEK Athens		16.500
(Scotland) Rangers		16.250
(Norway) Molde		15.000
(Germany) TSG Hoffenheim		14.956
(Israel) Hapoel Be'er Sheva		14.000
(Austria) LASK		14.000
(Romania) CFR Cluj		12.500

Pot 4
Team	Notes	Coeff.
(Ukraine) Zorya Luhansk		12.500
(France) Nice		11.849
(France) Lille		11.849
(Croatia) Rijeka		11.000
(Republic of Ireland) Dundalk		8.500
(Czech Republic) Slovan Liberec		8.000
(Belgium) Antwerp		7.580
(Poland) Lech Poznań		7.000
(Turkey) Sivasspor		6.720
(Austria) Wolfsberger AC		6.585
(Cyprus) Omonia		5.350
(Bulgaria) CSKA Sofia		4.000

Notes

1. ^{EL-CP} Winners of play-off round (Champions Path).
2. ^{EL-MP} Winners of play-off round (Main Path).
3. ^{CL-CP} Losers of Champions League play-off round (Champions Path).
4. ^{CL-LP} Losers of Champions League play-off round (League Path).
5. ^{CL-LQ} Losers of Champions League third qualifying round (League Path).

== Format ==
In each group, teams played against each other home-and-away in a round-robin format. The group winners and runners-up advanced to the round of 32, where they were joined by the eight third-placed teams of the Champions League group stage.

=== Tiebreakers ===
Teams were ranked according to points (3 points for a win, 1 point for a draw, 0 points for a loss), and if tied on points, the following tiebreaking criteria were applied, in the order given, to determine the rankings (Regulations Articles 16.01):

1. Points in head-to-head matches among tied teams;
2. Goal difference in head-to-head matches among tied teams;
3. Goals scored in head-to-head matches among tied teams;
4. Away goals scored in head-to-head matches among tied teams;
5. If more than two teams were tied, and after applying all head-to-head criteria above, a subset of teams were still tied, all head-to-head criteria above were reapplied exclusively to this subset of teams;
6. Goal difference in all group matches;
7. Goals scored in all group matches;
8. Away goals scored in all group matches;
9. Wins in all group matches;
10. Away wins in all group matches;
11. Disciplinary points (red card = 3 points, yellow card = 1 point, expulsion for two yellow cards in one match = 3 points);
12. UEFA club coefficient.

== Groups ==
The group stage fixtures were confirmed on 2 October 2020. The matchdays were 22 October, 29 October, 5 November, 26 November, 3 December, and 10 December 2020. The scheduled kickoff times were 18:55 and 21:00 CET/CEST.

Times are CET/CEST, (Note: CEST (UTC+2) for dates up to 24 October 2020 (matchday 1), and CET (UTC+1) for dates thereafter (matchdays 2–6).) as listed by UEFA (local times, if different, are in parentheses).

=== Group A ===
Pos	Team	Pld	W	D	L	GF	GA	GD	Pts	Qualification	ROM	YB	CLJ	CSS
1	(Italy) Roma	6	4	1	1	13	5	+8	13	Advance to knockout phase	—	3–1	5–0	0–0
2	(Switzerland) Young Boys	6	3	1	2	9	7	+2	10	Advance to knockout phase	1–2	—	2–1	3–0
3	(Romania) CFR Cluj	6	1	2	3	4	10	−6	5 (Note: Head-to-head points: CFR Cluj 4, CSKA Sofia 1.)		0–2	1–1	—	0–0
4	(Bulgaria) CSKA Sofia	6	1	2	3	3	7	−4	5		3–1	0–1	0–2	—

Source: UEFA
Rules for classification: Group stage tiebreakers
Notes:
22 October 2020
18:55

Young Boys (Switzerland)	1–2	(Italy) Roma
Nsame 14' (pen.)	Report	Peres 69'; Kumbulla 74'

Stadion Wankdorf, Bern
Attendance: 600
Referee: Carlos del Cerro Grande (Spain)
22 October 2020
18:55 (19:55 UTC+3)

CSKA Sofia (Bulgaria)	0–2	(Romania) CFR Cluj
	Report	Rondón 53'; Deac 74' (pen.)

Vasil Levski National Stadium, Sofia (Note: CSKA Sofia played their home matches at Vasil Levski National Stadium, Sofia, instead of their regular stadium Stadion Balgarska Armia, Sofia.)
Attendance: 11,958
Referee: Halil Umut Meler (Turkey)

29 October 2020
21:00

Roma (Italy)	0–0	(Bulgaria) CSKA Sofia
	Report

Stadio Olimpico, Rome
Attendance: 0 (Note: Due to the COVID-19 pandemic in Europe, the match was played behind closed doors.)
Referee: Aleksei Kulbakov (Belarus)
29 October 2020
21:00 (22:00 UTC+2)

CFR Cluj (Romania)	1–1	(Switzerland) Young Boys
Rondón 62'	Report	Fassnacht 69'

Stadionul Dr. Constantin Rădulescu, Cluj-Napoca
Attendance: 0
Referee: Glenn Nyberg (Sweden)

5 November 2020
18:55

Roma (Italy)	5–0	(Romania) CFR Cluj
Mkhitaryan 2'; Ibañez 24'; Mayoral 34', 84'; Pedro 89'	Report

Stadio Olimpico, Rome
Attendance: 0
Referee: Matej Jug (Slovenia)
5 November 2020
21:00

Young Boys (Switzerland)	3–0	(Bulgaria) CSKA Sofia
Mambimbi 2', 32'; Sulejmani 18'	Report

Stadion Wankdorf, Bern
Attendance: 0
Referee: Lawrence Visser (Belgium)

26 November 2020
18:55 (19:55 UTC+2)

CSKA Sofia (Bulgaria)	0–1	(Switzerland) Young Boys
	Report	Nsame 34'

Vasil Levski National Stadium, Sofia
Attendance: 0
Referee: Fábio Veríssimo (Portugal)
26 November 2020
21:00 (22:00 UTC+2)

CFR Cluj (Romania)	0–2	(Italy) Roma
	Report	Debeljuh 49' (o.g.); Veretout 67' (pen.)

Stadionul Dr. Constantin Rădulescu, Cluj-Napoca
Attendance: 0
Referee: Harald Lechner (Austria)

3 December 2020
21:00

Roma (Italy)	3–1	(Switzerland) Young Boys
Mayoral 44'; Calafiori 59'; Džeko 81'	Report	Nsame 34'

Stadio Olimpico, Rome
Attendance: 0
Referee: Fran Jović (Croatia)
3 December 2020
21:00 (22:00 UTC+2)

CFR Cluj (Romania)	0–0	(Bulgaria) CSKA Sofia
	Report

Stadionul Dr. Constantin Rădulescu, Cluj-Napoca
Attendance: 0
Referee: Amaury Delerue (France)

10 December 2020
18:55

Young Boys (Switzerland)	2–1	(Romania) CFR Cluj
Nsame 90+3' (pen.); Gaudino 90+6'	Report	Debeljuh 84'

Stadion Wankdorf, Bern
Attendance: 0
Referee: Benoît Bastien (France)
10 December 2020
18:55 (19:55 UTC+2)

CSKA Sofia (Bulgaria)	3–1	(Italy) Roma
Rodrigues 5'; Sowe 34', 55'	Report	Milanese 22'

Vasil Levski National Stadium, Sofia
Attendance: 0
Referee: Irfan Peljto (Bosnia and Herzegovina)

=== Group B ===
Pos	Team	Pld	W	D	L	GF	GA	GD	Pts	Qualification	ARS	MOL	RW	DUN
1	(England) Arsenal	6	6	0	0	20	5	+15	18	Advance to knockout phase	—	4–1	4–1	3–0
2	(Norway) Molde	6	3	1	2	9	11	−2	10	Advance to knockout phase	0–3	—	1–0	3–1
3	(Austria) Rapid Wien	6	2	1	3	11	13	−2	7		1–2	2–2	—	4–3
4	(Republic of Ireland) Dundalk	6	0	0	6	8	19	−11	0		2–4	1–2	1–3	—

Source: UEFA
Rules for classification: Group stage tiebreakers
22 October 2020
18:55 (17:55 UTC+1)

Dundalk (Republic of Ireland)	1–2	(Norway) Molde
Murray 35'	Report	Hussain 62'; Omoijuanfo 72' (pen.)

Tallaght Stadium, Tallaght (Note: Dundalk played their home matches at Tallaght Stadium, Tallaght, and Aviva Stadium, Dublin, instead of their regular stadium Oriel Park, Dundalk.)
Attendance: 0
Referee: Petri Viljanen (Finland)
22 October 2020
18:55

Rapid Wien (Austria)	1–2	(England) Arsenal
Fountas 51'	Report	David Luiz 70'; Aubameyang 74'

Allianz Stadion, Vienna
Attendance: 3,000
Referee: Pavel Královec (Czech Republic)

29 October 2020
21:00 (20:00 UTC+0)

Arsenal (England)	3–0	(Republic of Ireland) Dundalk
Nketiah 42'; Willock 44'; Pépé 46'	Report

Emirates Stadium, London
Attendance: 0
Referee: Filip Glova (Slovakia)
29 October 2020
21:00

Molde (Norway)	1–0	(Austria) Rapid Wien
Omoijuanfo 65'	Report

Aker Stadion, Molde
Attendance: 600
Referee: Petr Ardeleánu (Czech Republic)

5 November 2020
18:55

Rapid Wien (Austria)	4–3	(Republic of Ireland) Dundalk
Ljubicic 22'; Arase 79'; Hofmann 87'; Demir 90'	Report	Hoban 7'; McMillan 82' (pen.), 90+6' (pen.)

Allianz Stadion, Vienna
Attendance: 0
Referee: Trustin Farrugia Cann (Malta)
5 November 2020
21:00 (20:00 UTC+0)

Arsenal (England)	4–1	(Norway) Molde
Haugen 45+1' (o.g.); Sinyan 62' (o.g.); Pépé 69'; Willock 88'	Report	Ellingsen 22'

Emirates Stadium, London
Attendance: 0
Referee: Halil Umut Meler (Turkey)

26 November 2020
18:55

Molde (Norway)	0–3	(England) Arsenal
	Report	Pépé 50'; Nelson 55'; Balogun 83'

Aker Stadion, Molde
Attendance: 600
Referee: Irfan Peljto (Bosnia and Herzegovina)
26 November 2020
21:00 (20:00 UTC+0)

Dundalk (Republic of Ireland)	1–3	(Austria) Rapid Wien
Shields 63' (pen.)	Report	Knasmüllner 11'; Kara 37', 58'

Aviva Stadium, Dublin
Attendance: 0
Referee: Tamás Bognár (Hungary)

3 December 2020
21:00 (20:00 UTC+0)

Arsenal (England)	4–1	(Austria) Rapid Wien
Lacazette 10'; Marí 18'; Nketiah 44'; Smith Rowe 66'	Report	Kitagawa 47'

Emirates Stadium, London
Attendance: 2,000
Referee: Radu Petrescu (Romania)
3 December 2020
21:00

Molde (Norway)	3–1	(Republic of Ireland) Dundalk
Wolff Eikrem 30'; Omoijuanfo 41'; Ellingsen 67'	Report	Flores 90+4'

Aker Stadion, Molde
Attendance: 600
Referee: Daniel Siebert (Germany)

10 December 2020
18:55 (17:55 UTC+0)

Dundalk (Republic of Ireland)	2–4	(England) Arsenal
Flores 22'; Hoare 85'	Report	Nketiah 12'; Elneny 18'; Willock 67'; Balogun 80'

Aviva Stadium, Dublin
Attendance: 0
Referee: Ivan Bebek (Croatia)
10 December 2020
18:55

Rapid Wien (Austria)	2–2	(Norway) Molde
Ritzmaier 43'; İbrahimoğlu 90'	Report	Wolff Eikrem 12', 46'

Allianz Stadion, Vienna
Attendance: 0
Referee: Marco Guida (Italy)

=== Group C ===
Pos	Team	Pld	W	D	L	GF	GA	GD	Pts	Qualification	LEV	SLP	HBS	NCE
1	(Germany) Bayer Leverkusen	6	5	0	1	21	8	+13	15	Advance to knockout phase	—	4–0	4–1	6–2
2	(Czech Republic) Slavia Prague	6	4	0	2	11	10	+1	12	Advance to knockout phase	1–0	—	3–0	3–2
3	(Israel) Hapoel Be'er Sheva	6	2	0	4	7	13	−6	6		2–4	3–1	—	1–0
4	(France) Nice	6	1	0	5	8	16	−8	3		2–3	1–3	1–0	—

Source: UEFA
Rules for classification: Group stage tiebreakers
22 October 2020
18:55

Bayer Leverkusen (Germany)	6–2	(France) Nice
Amiri 11'; Alario 16'; Diaby 61'; Bellarabi 79', 83'; Wirtz 87'	Report	Gouiri 31'; Claude-Maurice 90'

BayArena, Leverkusen
Attendance: 0
Referee: Fran Jović (Croatia)
22 October 2020
18:55 (19:55 UTC+3)

Hapoel Be'er Sheva (Israel)	3–1	(Czech Republic) Slavia Prague
Agudelo 45'; Acolatse 86', 88'	Report	Provod 75'

HaMoshava Stadium, Petah Tikva (Note: Hapoel Be'er Sheva played their home matches at HaMoshava Stadium, Petah Tikva, instead of their regular stadium Turner Stadium, Be'er Sheva, due to its structural problems.)
Attendance: 40
Referee: Lawrence Visser (Belgium)

29 October 2020
21:00

Slavia Prague (Czech Republic)	1–0	(Germany) Bayer Leverkusen
Olayinka 80'	Report

Sinobo Stadium, Prague
Attendance: 0
Referee: Willie Collum (Scotland)
29 October 2020
21:00

Nice (France)	1–0	(Israel) Hapoel Be'er Sheva
Gouiri 23'	Report

Allianz Riviera, Nice
Attendance: 0
Referee: Chris Kavanagh (England)

5 November 2020
18:55

Slavia Prague (Czech Republic)	3–2	(France) Nice
Kuchta 16', 71'; Sima 43'	Report	Gouiri 33'; Ndoye 90+3'

Sinobo Stadium, Prague
Attendance: 0
Referee: Jakob Kehlet (Denmark)
5 November 2020
18:55 (19:55 UTC+2)

Hapoel Be'er Sheva (Israel)	2–4	(Germany) Bayer Leverkusen
Acolatse 11', 25'	Report	Bailey 5', 75'; Dadia 39' (o.g.); Wirtz 88'

HaMoshava Stadium, Petah Tikva
Attendance: 0
Referee: Radu Petrescu (Romania)

26 November 2020
21:00

Bayer Leverkusen (Germany)	4–1	(Israel) Hapoel Be'er Sheva
Schick 29'; Bailey 48'; Demirbay 76'; Alario 80'	Report	Shviro 58'

BayArena, Leverkusen
Attendance: 0
Referee: Paweł Gil (Poland)
26 November 2020
21:00

Nice (France)	1–3	(Czech Republic) Slavia Prague
Gouiri 61'	Report	Lingr 15'; Olayinka 64'; Sima 75'

Allianz Riviera, Nice
Attendance: 0
Referee: Glenn Nyberg (Sweden)

3 December 2020
21:00

Slavia Prague (Czech Republic)	3–0	(Israel) Hapoel Be'er Sheva
Sima 31'; Stanciu 36'; Twito 85' (o.g.)	Report

Sinobo Stadium, Prague
Attendance: 600
Referee: Tamás Bognár (Hungary)
3 December 2020
21:00

Nice (France)	2–3	(Germany) Bayer Leverkusen
Kamara 26'; Ndoye 47'	Report	Diaby 22'; Dragović 32'; Baumgartlinger 51'

Allianz Riviera, Nice
Attendance: 0
Referee: Maurizio Mariani (Italy)

10 December 2020
18:55

Bayer Leverkusen (Germany)	4–0	(Czech Republic) Slavia Prague
Bailey 8', 32'; Diaby 59'; Bellarabi 90+1'	Report

BayArena, Leverkusen
Attendance: 0
Referee: Anastasios Sidiropoulos (Greece)
10 December 2020
18:55 (19:55 UTC+2)

Hapoel Be'er Sheva (Israel)	1–0	(France) Nice
Hatuel 72'	Report

HaMoshava Stadium, Petah Tikva
Attendance: 0
Referee: Kristo Tohver (Estonia)

=== Group D ===
Pos	Team	Pld	W	D	L	GF	GA	GD	Pts	Qualification	RAN	BEN	STL	LCH
1	(Scotland) Rangers	6	4	2	0	13	7	+6	14	Advance to knockout phase	—	2–2	3–2	1–0
2	(Portugal) Benfica	6	3	3	0	18	9	+9	12	Advance to knockout phase	3–3	—	3–0	4–0
3	(Belgium) Standard Liège	6	1	1	4	7	14	−7	4		0–2	2–2	—	2–1
4	(Poland) Lech Poznań	6	1	0	5	6	14	−8	3		0–2	2–4	3–1	—

Source: UEFA
Rules for classification: Group stage tiebreakers
22 October 2020
18:55

Standard Liège (Belgium)	0–2	(Scotland) Rangers
	Report	Tavernier 19' (pen.); Roofe 90+3'

Stade Maurice Dufrasne, Liège
Attendance: 3,139
Referee: Jakob Kehlet (Denmark)
22 October 2020
18:55

Lech Poznań (Poland)	2–4	(Portugal) Benfica
Ishak 15', 48'	Report	Pizzi 9' (pen.); Núñez 42', 60', 90+3'

INEA Stadion, Poznań
Attendance: 0
Referee: Nikola Dabanović (Montenegro)

29 October 2020
21:00 (20:00 UTC+0)

Benfica (Portugal)	3–0	(Belgium) Standard Liège
Pizzi 49' (pen.), 76'; Waldschmidt 66' (pen.)	Report

Estádio da Luz, Lisbon
Attendance: 4,750
Referee: François Letexier (France)
29 October 2020
21:00 (20:00 UTC+0)

Rangers (Scotland)	1–0	(Poland) Lech Poznań
Morelos 68'	Report

Ibrox Stadium, Glasgow
Attendance: 11
Referee: Kristo Tohver (Estonia)

5 November 2020
18:55 (17:55 UTC+0)

Benfica (Portugal)	3–3	(Scotland) Rangers
Goldson 2' (o.g.); Silva 77'; Núñez 90+1'	Report	Gonçalves 24' (o.g.); Kamara 25'; Morelos 51'

Estádio da Luz, Lisbon
Attendance: 0
Referee: Jesús Gil Manzano (Spain)
5 November 2020
18:55

Lech Poznań (Poland)	3–1	(Belgium) Standard Liège
Skóraś 14'; Ishak 22', 48'	Report	Lestienne 29'

Stadion Miejski, Poznań
Attendance: 0
Referee: Manuel Schüttengruber (Austria)

26 November 2020
21:00

Standard Liège (Belgium)	2–1	(Poland) Lech Poznań
Tapsoba 63'; Laifis 90+4'	Report	Ishak 61'

Stade Maurice Dufrasne, Liège
Attendance: 0
Referee: Petr Ardeleánu (Czech Republic)
26 November 2020
21:00 (20:00 UTC+0)

Rangers (Scotland)	2–2	(Portugal) Benfica
Arfield 7'; Roofe 69'	Report	Tavernier 78' (o.g.); Pizzi 81'

Ibrox Stadium, Glasgow
Attendance: 0
Referee: Radu Petrescu (Romania)

3 December 2020
21:00 (20:00 UTC+0)

Benfica (Portugal)	4–0	(Poland) Lech Poznań
Vertonghen 36'; Núñez 57'; Pizzi 58'; Weigl 89'	Report

Estádio da Luz, Lisbon
Attendance: 0
Referee: Srđan Jovanović (Serbia)
3 December 2020
21:00 (20:00 UTC+0)

Rangers (Scotland)	3–2	(Belgium) Standard Liège
Goldson 39'; Tavernier 45+1' (pen.); Arfield 63'	Report	Lestienne 6'; Čop 41'

Ibrox Stadium, Glasgow
Attendance: 0
Referee: Bojan Pandžić (Sweden)

10 December 2020
18:55

Standard Liège (Belgium)	2–2	(Portugal) Benfica
Raskin 12'; Tapsoba 60'	Report	Everton 16'; Pizzi 67' (pen.)

Stade Maurice Dufrasne, Liège
Attendance: 0
Referee: Aleksei Kulbakov (Belarus)
10 December 2020
18:55

Lech Poznań (Poland)	0–2	(Scotland) Rangers
	Report	Itten 31'; Hagi 72'

Stadion Miejski, Poznań
Attendance: 0
Referee: José María Sánchez (Spain)

=== Group E ===
Pos	Team	Pld	W	D	L	GF	GA	GD	Pts	Qualification	PSV	GRA	PAOK	OMO
1	(Netherlands) PSV Eindhoven	6	4	0	2	12	9	+3	12	Advance to knockout phase	—	1–2	3–2	4–0
2	(Spain) Granada	6	3	2	1	6	3	+3	11	Advance to knockout phase	0–1	—	0–0	2–1
3	(Greece) PAOK	6	1	3	2	8	7	+1	6		4–1	0–0	—	1–1
4	(Cyprus) Omonia	6	1	1	4	5	12	−7	4		1–2	0–2	2–1	—

Source: UEFA
Rules for classification: Group stage tiebreakers
22 October 2020
18:55

PSV Eindhoven (Netherlands)	1–2	(Spain) Granada
Götze 45+1'	Report	Molina 57'; Machís 66'

Philips Stadion, Eindhoven
Attendance: 0
Referee: Felix Zwayer (Germany)
22 October 2020
18:55 (19:55 UTC+3)

PAOK (Greece)	1–1	(Cyprus) Omonia
Murg 56'	Report	Bauthéac 16'

Toumba Stadium, Thessaloniki
Attendance: 0
Referee: Bobby Madden (Scotland)

29 October 2020
21:00 (22:00 UTC+2)

Omonia (Cyprus)	1–2	(Netherlands) PSV Eindhoven
Gómez 29'	Report	Malen 40', 90+2'

GSP Stadium, Strovolos
Attendance: 0
Referee: Donatas Rumšas (Lithuania)
29 October 2020
21:00

Granada (Spain)	0–0	(Greece) PAOK
	Report

Nuevo Los Cármenes, Granada
Attendance: 0
Referee: Tiago Martins (Portugal)

5 November 2020
18:55 (19:55 UTC+2)

PAOK (Greece)	4–1	(Netherlands) PSV Eindhoven
Schwab 47'; Živković 56', 66'; Tzolis 58'	Report	Zahavi 21' (pen.)

Toumba Stadium, Thessaloniki
Attendance: 0
Referee: Daniel Stefański (Poland)
5 November 2020
18:55 (19:55 UTC+2)

Omonia (Cyprus)	0–2	(Spain) Granada
	Report	Herrera 4'; Suárez 63'

GSP Stadium, Strovolos
Attendance: 0
Referee: Ivan Bebek (Croatia)

26 November 2020
21:00

PSV Eindhoven (Netherlands)	3–2	(Greece) PAOK
Gakpo 20'; Madueke 51'; Malen 53'	Report	Varela 4'; Tzolis 13'

Philips Stadion, Eindhoven
Attendance: 0
Referee: Andris Treimanis (Latvia)
26 November 2020
21:00

Granada (Spain)	2–1	(Cyprus) Omonia
Suárez 8'; Soro 73'	Report	Asante 60'

Nuevo Los Cármenes, Granada
Attendance: 0
Referee: Stéphanie Frappart (France)

3 December 2020
21:00

Granada (Spain)	0–1	(Netherlands) PSV Eindhoven
	Report	Malen 38'

Nuevo Los Cármenes, Granada
Attendance: 0
Referee: Roi Reinshreiber (Israel)
3 December 2020
21:00 (22:00 UTC+2)

Omonia (Cyprus)	2–1	(Greece) PAOK
Kakoullis 9'; Gómez 84' (pen.)	Report	Tzolis 39'

GSP Stadium, Strovolos
Attendance: 0
Referee: Craig Pawson (England)

10 December 2020
18:55

PSV Eindhoven (Netherlands)	4–0	(Cyprus) Omonia
Malen 35'; Dumfries 63' (pen.); Piroe 90+1', 90+3'	Report

Philips Stadion, Eindhoven
Attendance: 0
Referee: Kevin Clancy (Scotland)
10 December 2020
18:55 (19:55 UTC+2)

PAOK (Greece)	0–0	(Spain) Granada
	Report

Toumba Stadium, Thessaloniki
Attendance: 0
Referee: John Beaton (Scotland)

=== Group F ===
Pos	Team	Pld	W	D	L	GF	GA	GD	Pts	Qualification	NAP	RSO	AZ	RJK
1	(Italy) Napoli	6	3	2	1	7	4	+3	11	Advance to knockout phase	—	1–1	0–1	2–0
2	(Spain) Real Sociedad	6	2	3	1	5	4	+1	9	Advance to knockout phase	0–1	—	1–0	2–2
3	(Netherlands) AZ	6	2	2	2	7	5	+2	8		1–1	0–0	—	4–1
4	(Croatia) Rijeka	6	1	1	4	6	12	−6	4		1–2	0–1	2–1	—

Source: UEFA
Rules for classification: Group stage tiebreakers
22 October 2020
18:55

Napoli (Italy)	0–1	(Netherlands) AZ
	Report	De Wit 57'

Stadio San Paolo, Naples
Attendance: 494
Referee: Daniel Stefański (Poland)
22 October 2020
18:55

Rijeka (Croatia)	0–1	(Spain) Real Sociedad
	Report	Bautista 90+3'

Stadion Rujevica, Rijeka
Attendance: 2,089
Referee: Bartosz Frankowski (Poland)

29 October 2020
21:00

Real Sociedad (Spain)	0–1	(Italy) Napoli
	Report	Politano 56'

Anoeta, San Sebastián
Attendance: 0
Referee: Craig Pawson (England)
29 October 2020
21:00

AZ (Netherlands)	4–1	(Croatia) Rijeka
Koopmeiners 6' (pen.); Guðmundsson 20', 60'; Karlsson 51'	Report	Kulenović 72'

AFAS Stadion, Alkmaar
Attendance: 0
Referee: Sergey Ivanov (Russia)

5 November 2020
18:55

Real Sociedad (Spain)	1–0	(Netherlands) AZ
Portu 58'	Report

Anoeta, San Sebastián
Attendance: 0
Referee: John Beaton (Scotland)
5 November 2020
18:55

Rijeka (Croatia)	1–2	(Italy) Napoli
Murić 13'	Report	Demme 43'; Braut 62' (o.g.)

Stadion Rujevica, Rijeka
Attendance: 0
Referee: Mattias Gestranius (Finland)

26 November 2020
21:00

Napoli (Italy)	2–0	(Croatia) Rijeka
Anastasio 41' (o.g.); Lozano 75'	Report

Stadio San Paolo, Naples
Attendance: 0
Referee: Halis Özkahya (Turkey)
26 November 2020
21:00

AZ (Netherlands)	0–0	(Spain) Real Sociedad
	Report

AFAS Stadion, Alkmaar
Attendance: 0
Referee: Aleksandar Stavrev (North Macedonia)

3 December 2020
21:00

AZ (Netherlands)	1–1	(Italy) Napoli
Martins Indi 54'	Report	Mertens 6'

AFAS Stadion, Alkmaar
Attendance: 0
Referee: Ruddy Buquet (France)
3 December 2020
21:00

Real Sociedad (Spain)	2–2	(Croatia) Rijeka
Bautista 69'; Monreal 79'	Report	Velkovski 38'; Lončar 73'

Anoeta, San Sebastián
Attendance: 0
Referee: João Pinheiro (Portugal)

10 December 2020
18:55

Napoli (Italy)	1–1	(Spain) Real Sociedad
Zieliński 35'	Report	Willian José 90+2'

Stadio San Paolo, Naples
Attendance: 0
Referee: Orel Grinfeld (Israel)
10 December 2020
18:55

Rijeka (Croatia)	2–1	(Netherlands) AZ
Menalo 52'; Tomečak 90+3'	Report	Wijndal 57'

Stadion Rujevica, Rijeka
Attendance: 0
Referee: Sergei Karasev (Russia)

=== Group G ===
Pos	Team	Pld	W	D	L	GF	GA	GD	Pts	Qualification	LEI	BRA	ZOR	AEK
1	(England) Leicester City	6	4	1	1	14	5	+9	13 (Note: Head-to-head points: Leicester City 4, Braga 1.)	Advance to knockout phase	—	4–0	3–0	2–0
2	(Portugal) Braga	6	4	1	1	14	10	+4	13	Advance to knockout phase	3–3	—	2–0	3–0
3	(Ukraine) Zorya Luhansk	6	2	0	4	6	11	−5	6		1–0	1–2	—	1–4
4	(Greece) AEK Athens	6	1	0	5	7	15	−8	3		1–2	2–4	0–3	—

Source: UEFA
Rules for classification: Group stage tiebreakers
Notes:
22 October 2020
21:00 (20:00 UTC+1)

Braga (Portugal)	3–0	(Greece) AEK Athens
Galeno 44'; Paulinho 78'; R. Horta 88'	Report

Estádio Municipal, Braga
Attendance: 2,196
Referee: Ruddy Buquet (France)
22 October 2020
21:00 (20:00 UTC+1)

Leicester City (England)	3–0	(Ukraine) Zorya Luhansk
Maddison 29'; Barnes 45'; Iheanacho 67'	Report

King Power Stadium, Leicester
Attendance: 1
Referee: Stéphanie Frappart (France)

29 October 2020
18:55 (19:55 UTC+2)

AEK Athens (Greece)	1–2	(England) Leicester City
Tanković 49'	Report	Vardy 18' (pen.); Choudhury 39'

Olympic Stadium, Athens
Attendance: 0
Referee: Harald Lechner (Austria)
29 October 2020
18:55 (19:55 UTC+2)

Zorya Luhansk (Ukraine)	1–2	(Portugal) Braga
Ivanisenya 90+6'	Report	Paulinho 4'; Gaitán 11'

Slavutych-Arena, Zaporizhzhia (Note: Zorya Luhanskk played their home matches at Slavutych-Arena, Zaporizhzhia, instead of their regular stadium Avanhard Stadium, Luhansk, due to the war conditions in Eastern Ukraine.)
Attendance: 853
Referee: Giorgi Kruashvili (Georgia)

5 November 2020
21:00 (20:00 UTC+0)

Leicester City (England)	4–0	(Portugal) Braga
Iheanacho 21', 48'; Praet 67'; Maddison 78'	Report

King Power Stadium, Leicester
Attendance: 0
Referee: Bas Nijhuis (Netherlands)
5 November 2020
21:00 (22:00 UTC+2)

Zorya Luhansk (Ukraine)	1–4	(Greece) AEK Athens
Kocherin 81'	Report	Tanković 7'; Mantalos 34'; Livaja 54', 81'

Slavutych-Arena, Zaporizhzhia
Attendance: 0
Referee: Willie Collum (Scotland)

26 November 2020
18:55 (17:55 UTC+0)

Braga (Portugal)	3–3	(England) Leicester City
Elmusrati 4'; Paulinho 24'; Fransérgio 90+1'	Report	Barnes 9'; Thomas 79'; Vardy 90+5'

Estádio Municipal, Braga
Attendance: 0
Referee: Daniele Orsato (Italy)
26 November 2020
18:55 (19:55 UTC+2)

AEK Athens (Greece)	0–3	(Ukraine) Zorya Luhansk
	Report	Hromov 61'; Kabayev 76'; Yurchenko 86' (pen.)

Olympic Stadium, Athens
Attendance: 0
Referee: Aliyar Aghayev (Azerbaijan)

3 December 2020
18:55 (19:55 UTC+2)

AEK Athens (Greece)	2–4	(Portugal) Braga
Oliveira 31'; Vasilantonopoulos 89'	Report	Tormena 8'; Esgaio 10'; R. Horta 45'; Galeno 83'

Olympic Stadium, Athens
Attendance: 0
Referee: Georgi Kabakov (Bulgaria)
3 December 2020
18:55 (19:55 UTC+2)

Zorya Luhansk (Ukraine)	1–0	(England) Leicester City
Sayyadmanesh 84'	Report

Slavutych-Arena, Zaporizhzhia
Attendance: 0
Referee: Espen Eskås (Norway)

10 December 2020
21:00 (20:00 UTC+0)

Braga (Portugal)	2–0	(Ukraine) Zorya Luhansk
Abu Hanna 61' (o.g.); R. Horta 68'	Report

Estádio Municipal, Braga
Attendance: 0
Referee: Daniel Stefański (Poland)
10 December 2020
21:00 (20:00 UTC+0)

Leicester City (England)	2–0	(Greece) AEK Athens
Ünder 12'; Barnes 14'	Report

King Power Stadium, Leicester
Attendance: 0
Referee: Lawrence Visser (Belgium)

=== Group H ===
Pos	Team	Pld	W	D	L	GF	GA	GD	Pts	Qualification	MIL	LOSC	SPP	CEL
1	(Italy) Milan	6	4	1	1	12	7	+5	13	Advance to knockout phase	—	0–3	3–0	4–2
2	(France) Lille	6	3	2	1	14	8	+6	11	Advance to knockout phase	1–1	—	2–1	2–2
3	(Czech Republic) Sparta Prague	6	2	0	4	10	12	−2	6		0–1	1–4	—	4–1
4	(Scotland) Celtic	6	1	1	4	10	19	−9	4		1–3	3–2	1–4	—

Source: UEFA
Rules for classification: Group stage tiebreakers
22 October 2020
21:00 (20:00 UTC+1)

Celtic (Scotland)	1–3	(Italy) Milan
Elyounoussi 76'	Report	Krunić 14'; Brahim 42'; Hauge 90+2'

Celtic Park, Glasgow
Attendance: 316
Referee: Matej Jug (Slovenia)
22 October 2020
21:00

Sparta Prague (Czech Republic)	1–4	(France) Lille
Dočkal 47'	Report	Yazıcı 45+1', 60', 75'; Ikoné 66'

Stadion Letná, Prague
Attendance: 0
Referee: Duje Strukan (Croatia)

29 October 2020
18:55

Milan (Italy)	3–0	(Czech Republic) Sparta Prague
Brahim 24'; Leão 57'; Dalot 67'	Report

San Siro, Milan
Attendance: 0
Referee: Halis Özkahya (Turkey)
29 October 2020
18:55

Lille (France)	2–2	(Scotland) Celtic
Çelik 67'; Ikoné 75'	Report	Elyounoussi 28', 33'

Stade Pierre-Mauroy, Villeneuve-d'Ascq
Attendance: 0
Referee: Aleksandar Stavrev (North Macedonia)

5 November 2020
21:00 (20:00 UTC+0)

Celtic (Scotland)	1–4	(Czech Republic) Sparta Prague
Griffiths 65'	Report	Juliš 26', 45', 77'; Krejčí 90'

Celtic Park, Glasgow
Attendance: 397
Referee: István Kovács (Romania)
5 November 2020
21:00

Milan (Italy)	0–3	(France) Lille
	Report	Yazıcı 22' (pen.), 55', 58'

San Siro, Milan
Attendance: 0
Referee: Bartosz Frankowski (Poland)

26 November 2020
18:55

Sparta Prague (Czech Republic)	4–1	(Scotland) Celtic
Hancko 26'; Juliš 38', 80'; Plavšić 90+4'	Report	Édouard 15'

Stadion Letná, Prague
Attendance: 0
Referee: Tobias Stieler (Germany)
26 November 2020
18:55

Lille (France)	1–1	(Italy) Milan
Bamba 65'	Report	Castillejo 46'

Stade Pierre-Mauroy, Villeneuve-d'Ascq
Attendance: 0
Referee: Craig Pawson (England)

3 December 2020
18:55

Milan (Italy)	4–2	(Scotland) Celtic
Çalhanoğlu 24'; Castillejo 26'; Hauge 50'; Brahim 82'	Report	Rogic 7'; Édouard 14'

San Siro, Milan
Attendance: 0
Referee: Ricardo de Burgos Bengoetxea (Spain)
3 December 2020
18:55

Lille (France)	2–1	(Czech Republic) Sparta Prague
Yılmaz 80', 84'	Report	Krejčí 71'

Stade Pierre-Mauroy, Villeneuve-d'Ascq
Attendance: 0
Referee: Xavier Estrada Fernández (Spain)

10 December 2020
21:00 (20:00 UTC+0)

Celtic (Scotland)	3–2	(France) Lille
Jullien 22'; McGregor 28' (pen.); Turnbull 75'	Report	Ikoné 24'; Weah 71'

Celtic Park, Glasgow
Attendance: 300
Referee: Fábio Veríssimo (Portugal)
10 December 2020
21:00

Sparta Prague (Czech Republic)	0–1	(Italy) Milan
	Report	Hauge 23'

Stadion Letná, Prague
Attendance: 0
Referee: Daniel Siebert (Germany)

=== Group I ===
Pos	Team	Pld	W	D	L	GF	GA	GD	Pts	Qualification	VIL	MTA	SIV	QRB
1	(Spain) Villarreal	6	5	1	0	17	5	+12	16	Advance to knockout phase	—	4–0	5–3	3–0 (Note: The Villarreal v Qarabağ match was awarded as a 3–0 win to Villarreal after being cancelled as several players of the Qarabağ squad tested positive for the SARS-CoV-2.)
2	(Israel) Maccabi Tel Aviv	6	3	2	1	6	7	−1	11	Advance to knockout phase	1–1	—	1–0	1–0
3	(Turkey) Sivasspor	6	2	0	4	9	11	−2	6		0–1	1–2	—	2–0
4	(Azerbaijan) Qarabağ	6	0	1	5	4	13	−9	1		1–3	1–1	2–3	—

Source: UEFA
Rules for classification: Group stage tiebreakers
Notes:
22 October 2020
21:00

Villarreal (Spain)	5–3	(Turkey) Sivasspor
Kubo 13'; Bacca 20'; Foyth 57'; Alcácer 74', 78'	Report	Kayode 33'; Yatabaré 43'; Gradel 64'

Estadio de la Cerámica, Villarreal
Attendance: 0
Referee: Paweł Raczkowski (Poland)
22 October 2020
21:00 (22:00 UTC+3)

Maccabi Tel Aviv (Israel)	1–0	(Azerbaijan) Qarabağ
Cohen 10'	Report

Bloomfield Stadium, Tel Aviv
Attendance: 0
Referee: John Beaton (Scotland)

29 October 2020
18:55 (20:55 UTC+3)

Qarabağ (Azerbaijan)	1–3	(Spain) Villarreal
Owusu 78'	Report	Pino 80'; Alcácer 84', 90+5' (pen.)

Başakşehir Fatih Terim Stadium, Istanbul, Turkey (Note: Qarabağ played their home matches at Başakşehir Fatih Terim Stadium, Istanbul, Turkey, instead of their regular stadium Tofiq Bahramov Republican Stadium, Baku, as UEFA matches in Armenia and Azerbaijan were temporarily suspended, due to the 2020 Nagorno-Karabakh conflict.)
Attendance: 0
Referee: Pavel Orel (Czech Republic)
29 October 2020
18:55 (20:55 UTC+3)

Sivasspor (Turkey)	1–2	(Israel) Maccabi Tel Aviv
Kayode 55'	Report	Biton 69' (pen.); Peretz 74'

New Sivas 4 Eylül Stadium, Sivas
Attendance: 348
Referee: Irfan Peljto (Bosnia and Herzegovina)

5 November 2020
18:55 (20:55 UTC+3)

Sivasspor (Turkey)	2–0	(Azerbaijan) Qarabağ
Osmanpaşa 11'; Kayode 88'	Report

New Sivas 4 Eylül Stadium, Sivas
Attendance: 296
Referee: Sandro Schärer (Switzerland)
5 November 2020
22:10 (Note: The Villarreal v Maccabi Tel Aviv match was originally scheduled at 21:00, but was delayed due to heavy rain.)

Villarreal (Spain)	4–0	(Israel) Maccabi Tel Aviv
Bacca 4', 52'; Baena 71'; Niño 81'	Report

Estadio de la Cerámica, Villarreal
Attendance: 0
Referee: Nikola Dabanović (Montenegro)

26 November 2020
18:55 (19:55 UTC+2)

Maccabi Tel Aviv (Israel)	1–1	(Spain) Villarreal
Pešić 47'	Report	Baena 45'

Bloomfield Stadium, Tel Aviv
Attendance: 0
Referee: Tiago Martins (Portugal)
26 November 2020
18:55 (20:55 UTC+3)

Qarabağ (Azerbaijan)	2–3	(Turkey) Sivasspor
Zoubir 8'; Matić 51'	Report	Koné 40' (pen.), 79'; Kayode 58'

Başakşehir Fatih Terim Stadium, Istanbul, Turkey
Attendance: 0
Referee: Jakob Kehlet (Denmark)

3 December 2020
18:55 (20:55 UTC+3)

Qarabağ (Azerbaijan)	1–1	(Israel) Maccabi Tel Aviv
Romero 37'	Report	Cohen 22' (pen.)

Başakşehir Fatih Terim Stadium, Istanbul, Turkey
Attendance: 0
Referee: Rob Hennessy (Republic of Ireland)
3 December 2020
18:55 (20:55 UTC+3)

Sivasspor (Turkey)	0–1	(Spain) Villarreal
	Report	Chukwueze 75'

New Sivas 4 Eylül Stadium, Sivas
Attendance: 0
Referee: Duje Strukan (Croatia)

10 December 2020
21:00

Villarreal (Spain)	3–0 Awarded (Note: The Villarreal v Qarabağ match was cancelled and awarded as a 3–0 win to Villarreal after several players of the Qarabağ squad tested positive for the SARS-CoV-2.)	(Azerbaijan) Qarabağ
	Report

Estadio de la Cerámica, Villarreal
Referee: Mykola Balakin (Ukraine)
10 December 2020
21:00 (22:00 UTC+2)

Maccabi Tel Aviv (Israel)	1–0	(Turkey) Sivasspor
Saborit 67'	Report

Bloomfield Stadium, Tel Aviv
Attendance: 0
Referee: Andris Treimanis (Latvia)

=== Group J ===
Pos	Team	Pld	W	D	L	GF	GA	GD	Pts	Qualification	TOT	ANT	LASK	LUD
1	(England) Tottenham Hotspur	6	4	1	1	15	5	+10	13	Advance to knockout phase	—	2–0	3–0	4–0
2	(Belgium) Antwerp	6	4	0	2	8	5	+3	12	Advance to knockout phase	1–0	—	0–1	3–1
3	(Austria) LASK	6	3	1	2	11	12	−1	10		3–3	0–2	—	4–3
4	(Bulgaria) Ludogorets Razgrad	6	0	0	6	7	19	−12	0		1–3	1–2	1–3	—

Source: UEFA
Rules for classification: Group stage tiebreakers
22 October 2020
21:00 (20:00 UTC+1)

Tottenham Hotspur (England)	3–0	(Austria) LASK
Lucas 18'; Andrade 27' (o.g.); Son Heung-min 84'	Report

Tottenham Hotspur Stadium, London
Attendance: 0
Referee: Mohammed Al-Hakim (Sweden)
22 October 2020
21:00 (22:00 UTC+3)

Ludogorets Razgrad (Bulgaria)	1–2	(Belgium) Antwerp
Higinio 46'	Report	Gerkens 63'; Refaelov 70'

Huvepharma Arena, Razgrad
Attendance: 2,321
Referee: Roi Reinshreiber (Israel)

29 October 2020
18:55

LASK (Austria)	4–3	(Bulgaria) Ludogorets Razgrad
Balić 2'; Gruber 12'; Raguž 35'; Verdon 56' (o.g.)	Report	Manu 15', 67', 74' (pen.)

Linzer Stadion, Linz (Note: LASK played their home matches at Linzer Stadion, Linz, instead of their regular stadium Waldstadion, Pasching.)
Attendance: 1,487
Referee: Xavier Estrada Fernández (Spain)
29 October 2020
18:55

Antwerp (Belgium)	1–0	(England) Tottenham Hotspur
Refaelov 29'	Report

Bosuilstadion, Antwerp
Attendance: 0
Referee: Maurizio Mariani (Italy)

5 November 2020
18:55 (19:55 UTC+2)

Ludogorets Razgrad (Bulgaria)	1–3	(England) Tottenham Hotspur
Keșerü 50'	Report	Kane 13'; Lucas 33'; Lo Celso 62'

Huvepharma Arena, Razgrad
Attendance: 0
Referee: Fran Jović (Croatia)
5 November 2020
21:00

Antwerp (Belgium)	0–1	(Austria) LASK
	Report	Eggestein 55'

Bosuilstadion, Antwerp
Attendance: 0
Referee: Yevhen Aranovskyi (Ukraine)

26 November 2020
18:55

LASK (Austria)	0–2	(Belgium) Antwerp
	Report	Refaelov 53'; Gerkens 83'

Linzer Stadion, Linz
Attendance: 0
Referee: Donatas Rumšas (Lithuania)
26 November 2020
21:00 (20:00 UTC+0)

Tottenham Hotspur (England)	4–0	(Bulgaria) Ludogorets Razgrad
Carlos Vinícius 16', 34'; Winks 63'; Lucas 73'	Report

Tottenham Hotspur Stadium, London
Attendance: 0
Referee: Giorgi Kruashvili (Georgia)

3 December 2020
18:55

LASK (Austria)	3–3	(England) Tottenham Hotspur
Michorl 42'; Eggestein 84'; Karamoko 90+3'	Report	Bale 45+2' (pen.); Son Heung-min 56'; Alli 87' (pen.)

Linzer Stadion, Linz
Attendance: 0
Referee: Paweł Raczkowski (Poland)
3 December 2020
18:55

Antwerp (Belgium)	3–1	(Bulgaria) Ludogorets Razgrad
Hongla 19'; De Laet 72'; Benson 87'	Report	Despodov 53'

Bosuilstadion, Antwerp
Attendance: 0
Referee: Pavel Orel (Czech Republic)

10 December 2020
21:00 (20:00 UTC+0)

Tottenham Hotspur (England)	2–0	(Belgium) Antwerp
Carlos Vinícius 57'; Lo Celso 71'	Report

Tottenham Hotspur Stadium, London
Attendance: 2,000
Referee: Jesús Gil Manzano (Spain)
10 December 2020
21:00 (22:00 UTC+2)

Ludogorets Razgrad (Bulgaria)	1–3	(Austria) LASK
Manu 46'	Report	Wiesinger 56'; Renner 62' (pen.); Madsen 67'

Huvepharma Arena, Razgrad
Attendance: 0
Referee: Vitali Meshkov (Russia)

=== Group K ===
Pos	Team	Pld	W	D	L	GF	GA	GD	Pts	Qualification	DZG	WAC	FEY	CSM
1	(Croatia) Dinamo Zagreb	6	4	2	0	9	1	+8	14	Advance to knockout phase	—	1–0	0–0	3–1
2	(Austria) Wolfsberger AC	6	3	1	2	7	6	+1	10	Advance to knockout phase	0–3	—	1–0	1–1
3	(Netherlands) Feyenoord	6	1	2	3	4	8	−4	5		0–2	1–4	—	3–1
4	(Russia) CSKA Moscow	6	0	3	3	3	8	−5	3		0–0	0–1	0–0	—

Source: UEFA
Rules for classification: Group stage tiebreakers
22 October 2020
21:00

Dinamo Zagreb (Croatia)	0–0	(Netherlands) Feyenoord
	Report

Stadion Maksimir, Zagreb
Attendance: 1,271
Referee: Mattias Gestranius (Finland)
22 October 2020
21:00

Wolfsberger AC (Austria)	1–1	(Russia) CSKA Moscow
Liendl 42' (pen.)	Report	Gaich 5'

Wörthersee Stadion, Klagenfurt (Note: Wolfsberger AC played their home matches at Wörthersee Stadion, Klagenfurt, instead of their regular stadium Lavanttal-Arena, Wolfsberg.)
Attendance: 3,000
Referee: Sascha Stegemann (Germany)

29 October 2020
18:55 (20:55 UTC+3)

CSKA Moscow (Russia)	0–0	(Croatia) Dinamo Zagreb
	Report

VEB Arena, Moscow
Attendance: 6,411
Referee: Radu Petrescu (Romania)
29 October 2020
18:55

Feyenoord (Netherlands)	1–4	(Austria) Wolfsberger AC
Berghuis 54'	Report	Liendl 4' (pen.), 13' (pen.), 60'; Joveljić 66' (pen.)

De Kuip, Rotterdam
Attendance: 0
Referee: Srđan Jovanović (Serbia)

5 November 2020
21:00

Dinamo Zagreb (Croatia)	1–0	(Austria) Wolfsberger AC
Atiemwen 76'	Report

Stadion Maksimir, Zagreb
Attendance: 0
Referee: Jérôme Brisard (France)
5 November 2020
21:00

Feyenoord (Netherlands)	3–1	(Russia) CSKA Moscow
Haps 63'; Kökçü 71'; Geertruida 72'	Report	Senesi 80' (o.g.)

De Kuip, Rotterdam
Attendance: 0
Referee: Roi Reinshreiber (Israel)

26 November 2020
18:55 (20:55 UTC+3)

CSKA Moscow (Russia)	0–0	(Netherlands) Feyenoord
	Report

VEB Arena, Moscow
Attendance: 5,407
Referee: Kristo Tohver (Estonia)
26 November 2020
18:55

Wolfsberger AC (Austria)	0–3	(Croatia) Dinamo Zagreb
	Report	Majer 60'; Petković 75'; Ivanušec 90+1'

Wörthersee Stadion, Klagenfurt
Attendance: 0
Referee: Serhiy Boyko (Ukraine)

3 December 2020
18:55 (20:55 UTC+3)

CSKA Moscow (Russia)	0–1	(Austria) Wolfsberger AC
	Report	Vizinger 22'

VEB Arena, Moscow
Attendance: 4,321
Referee: Nikola Dabanović (Montenegro)
3 December 2020
18:55

Feyenoord (Netherlands)	0–2	(Croatia) Dinamo Zagreb
	Report	Petković 45+5' (pen.); Majer 53'

De Kuip, Rotterdam
Attendance: 0
Referee: Chris Kavanagh (England)

10 December 2020
21:00

Dinamo Zagreb (Croatia)	3–1	(Russia) CSKA Moscow
Gvardiol 28'; Oršić 41'; Kastrati 75'	Report	Bistrović 77'

Stadion Maksimir, Zagreb
Attendance: 0
Referee: Tiago Martins (Portugal)
10 December 2020
21:00

Wolfsberger AC (Austria)	1–0	(Netherlands) Feyenoord
Joveljić 31'	Report

Wörthersee Stadion, Klagenfurt
Attendance: 0
Referee: Paweł Raczkowski (Poland)

=== Group L ===
Pos	Team	Pld	W	D	L	GF	GA	GD	Pts	Qualification	HOF	ZVE	LIB	GNT
1	(Germany) TSG Hoffenheim	6	5	1	0	17	2	+15	16	Advance to knockout phase	—	2–0	5–0	4–1
2	(Serbia) Red Star Belgrade	6	3	2	1	9	4	+5	11	Advance to knockout phase	0–0	—	5–1	2–1
3	(Czech Republic) Slovan Liberec	6	2	1	3	4	13	−9	7		0–2	0–0	—	1–0
4	(Belgium) Gent	6	0	0	6	4	15	−11	0		1–4	0–2	1–2	—

Source: UEFA
Rules for classification: Group stage tiebreakers
22 October 2020
21:00

TSG Hoffenheim (Germany)	2–0	(Serbia) Red Star Belgrade
Baumgartner 64'; Dabbur 90+3'	Report

Rhein-Neckar-Arena, Sinsheim
Attendance: 0
Referee: Alejandro José Hernández Hernández (Spain)
22 October 2020
21:00

Slovan Liberec (Czech Republic)	1–0	(Belgium) Gent
Helal 29'	Report

Stadion u Nisy, Liberec
Attendance: 0
Referee: Manuel Schüttengruber (Austria)

29 October 2020
18:55

Gent (Belgium)	1–4	(Germany) TSG Hoffenheim
Kleindienst 90+3'	Report	Belfodil 36' (pen.); Grillitsch 52'; Gaćinović 73'; Dabbur 90+4'

Ghelamco Arena, Ghent
Attendance: 0
Referee: Sandro Schärer (Switzerland)
29 October 2020
18:55

Red Star Belgrade (Serbia)	5–1	(Czech Republic) Slovan Liberec
Ben 7', 22'; Gajić 50'; Katai 67'; Falcinelli 70'	Report	Matoušek 41'

Red Star Stadium, Belgrade
Attendance: 0
Referee: Fábio Veríssimo (Portugal)

5 November 2020
21:00

Red Star Belgrade (Serbia)	2–1	(Belgium) Gent
Kanga 12'; Katai 59'	Report	Odjidja-Ofoe 31'

Red Star Stadium, Belgrade
Attendance: 0
Referee: Michael Fabbri (Italy)
5 November 2020
21:00

TSG Hoffenheim (Germany)	5–0	(Czech Republic) Slovan Liberec
Dabbur 22', 30'; Grillitsch 59'; Adamyan 71', 76'	Report

Rhein-Neckar-Arena, Sinsheim
Attendance: 0
Referee: Sergei Karasev (Russia)

26 November 2020
18:55

Gent (Belgium)	0–2	(Serbia) Red Star Belgrade
	Report	Petrović 2'; Milunović 58'

Ghelamco Arena, Ghent
Attendance: 0
Referee: Filip Glova (Slovakia)
26 November 2020
18:55

Slovan Liberec (Czech Republic)	0–2	(Germany) TSG Hoffenheim
	Report	Baumgartner 77'; Kramarić 89' (pen.)

Stadion u Nisy, Liberec
Attendance: 0
Referee: Jérôme Brisard (France)

3 December 2020
18:55

Gent (Belgium)	1–2	(Czech Republic) Slovan Liberec
Yaremchuk 60'	Report	Mara 32'; Kacharaba 55'

Ghelamco Arena, Ghent
Attendance: 0
Referee: Kateryna Monzul (Ukraine)
3 December 2020
18:55

Red Star Belgrade (Serbia)	0–0	(Germany) TSG Hoffenheim
	Report

Red Star Stadium, Belgrade
Attendance: 0
Referee: Bobby Madden (Scotland)

10 December 2020
21:00

TSG Hoffenheim (Germany)	4–1	(Belgium) Gent
Beier 21', 49'; Skov 26'; Kramarić 64'	Report	Fortuna 81'

Rhein-Neckar-Arena, Sinsheim
Attendance: 0
Referee: Anastasios Papapetrou (Greece)
10 December 2020
21:00

Slovan Liberec (Czech Republic)	0–0	(Serbia) Red Star Belgrade
	Report

Stadion u Nisy, Liberec
Attendance: 0
Referee: Mattias Gestranius (Finland)
