= Dmytro Piddubnyi =

Ukrainian footballer

Personal information
- Full name: Dmytro Ihorovych Piddubnyi
- Date of birth: 15 January 2000 (age 26)
- Place of birth: Demianivka, Kherson Oblast, Ukraine
- Height: 1.85 m (6 ft 1 in)
- Position: Midfielder

Youth career
- 2013–2014: UOR Simferopol
- 2016–2017: DVUFK Dnipro
- 2017–2020: Zorya Luhansk

Senior career*
Years	Team	Apps	(Gls)
2020–2021	Zorya Luhansk	2	(0)
2021	→ VPK-Ahro Shevchenkivka (loan)	5	(0)
2021–2023	Metalurh Zaporizhzhia	40	(2)
2024	Mynai	5	(0)
- * Club domestic league appearances and goals as of 20 June 2024

Dmytro Ihorovych Piddubnyi (Ukrainian: Дмитро Ігорович Піддубний; born 15 January 2000) is a Ukrainian professional football midfielder.

== Career ==
Piddubnyi is a product of the UOR Simferopol, DVUFK Dnipropetrovsk and Zorya Luhansk Youth Sportive Sportive Systems.

He played for FC Zorya in the Ukrainian Premier League Reserves and in March 2020 Piddubnyi was promoted to the senior squad team. He made his debut in the Ukrainian Premier League for Zorya Luhansk on 22 August 2020, played as a substituted second-half player in a losing away match against FC Desna Chernihiv.
