= Max Grechkin =

Israeli footballer

Personal information
- Full name: Maxim Grechkin
- Date of birth: 4 March 1996 (age 30)
- Place of birth: Kyiv, Ukraine
- Height: 1.82 m (5 ft 11 1/2 in)
- Position: Left back

Team information
- Current team: Bnei Sakhnin
- Number: 55

Youth career
- 2007–2011: Hapoel Tzafririm Holon
- 2011–2015: Maccabi Tel Aviv

Senior career*
Years	Team	Apps	(Gls)
2015–2019	Maccabi Tel Aviv	0	(0)
2016	→ Hapoel Ramat HaSharon (loan)	16	(0)
2016–2017	→ Beitar Tel Aviv Ramla (loan)	13	(0)
2017–2018	→ Hapoel Ramat HaSharon (loan)	28	(0)
2018–2019	→ Hapoel Hadera (loan)	21	(1)
2019–2023	Beitar Jerusalem	77	(0)
2020–2021	→ Zorya Luhansk (loan)	3	(0)
2021	→ Hapoel Hadera (loan)	11	(0)
2023–2025	Hapoel Jerusalem	32	(0)
2025–	Bnei Sakhnin	12	(0)

International career
2017	Israel U21	1	(0)
2022	Israel	1	(0)
- * Club domestic league appearances and goals as of 24 June 2026

Maxim "Max" Grechkin (or Maksim, Hebrew: מקסים ״מקס״ גרצ'קין, Ukrainian: Максим Гречкін; born 4 March 1996) is a professional footballer currently with Bnei Sakhnin. Born in Ukraine, he represents the Israel national team.

On 29 May 2023 signed to Hapoel Jerusalem.

== Career statistics ==
=== Club ===
As of 1 June 2024

Club	Season	League			National Cup		League Cup		Continental		Other		Total	
Club	Season	Division	Apps	Goals	Apps	Goals	Apps	Goals	Apps	Goals	Apps	Goals	Apps	Goals
Maccabi Tel Aviv	2015–16	Israeli Premier League	0	0	0	0	1	0	0	0	0	0	1	0
Hapoel Ramat HaSharon	2015–16	Liga Leumit	16	0	0	0	0	0	0	0	0	0	16	0
Beitar Tel Aviv Ramla	2016–17	Liga Leumit	13	0	1	0	2	0	0	0	0	0	16	0
Hapoel Ramat HaSharon	2017–18	Liga Leumit	28	0	1	0	2	0	0	0	0	0	31	0
Hapoel Hadera	2018–19	Israeli Premier League	21	1	1	0	4	0	0	0	0	0	26	1
Beitar Jerusalem	2019–20	Israeli Premier League	23	0	3	0	5	0	0	0	0	0	31	0
Zorya Luhansk	2020–21	Ukrainian Premier League	3	0	0	0	0	0	0	0	0	0	3	0
Hapoel Hadera	2020–21	Israeli Premier League	10	1	1	0	0	0	0	0	0	0	11	1
Beitar Jerusalem	2021–22	Israeli Premier League	26	0	1	0	4	0	0	0	0	0	31	0
Beitar Jerusalem	2022–23	Israeli Premier League	14	0	4	0	2	0	0	0	0	0	20	0
Beitar Jerusalem	Total		40	0	5	0	6	0	0	0	0	0	51	0
Hapoel Jerusalem	2023–24	Israeli Premier League	19	0	0	0	1	0	0	0	0	0	20	0
Hapoel Jerusalem	2024–25	Israeli Premier League	13	0	0	0	5	0	0	0	0	0	18	0
Hapoel Jerusalem	Total		32	0	0	0	6	0	0	0	0	0	38	0
Bnei Sakhnin	2025–26	Israeli Premier League	0	0	0	0	0	0	0	0	0	0	0	0
Bnei Sakhnin	Total		0	0	0	0	0	0	0	0	0	0	0	0
Career total			186	2	12	0	26	0	0	0	0	0	224	2
