= 2020–21 UEFA Europa League knockout phase =

International football competition

The 2020–21 UEFA Europa League knockout phase began on 18 February with the round of 32 and ended on 26 May 2021 with the final at Stadion Gdańsk in Gdańsk, Poland, to decide the champions of the 2020–21 UEFA Europa League. A total of 32 teams competed in the knockout phase.

Times are CET/CEST, (Note: CET (UTC+1) for dates up to 18 March 2021 (round of 32 and round of 16), and CEST (UTC+2) for dates thereafter (quarter-finals, semi-finals and final).) as listed by UEFA (local times, if different, are in parentheses).

== Qualified teams ==
The knockout phase involved 32 teams: the 24 teams which qualified as winners and runners-up of each of the twelve groups in the group stage, and the eight third-placed teams from the Champions League group stage.

=== Europa League group stage winners and runners-up ===
Group	Winners (seeded in round of 32 draw)	Runners-up (unseeded in round of 32 draw)
A	(Italy) Roma	(Switzerland) Young Boys
B	(England) Arsenal	(Norway) Molde
C	(Germany) Bayer Leverkusen	(Czech Republic) Slavia Prague
D	(Scotland) Rangers	(Portugal) Benfica
E	(Netherlands) PSV Eindhoven	(Spain) Granada
F	(Italy) Napoli	(Spain) Real Sociedad
G	(England) Leicester City	(Portugal) Braga
H	(Italy) Milan	(France) Lille
I	(Spain) Villarreal	(Israel) Maccabi Tel Aviv
J	(England) Tottenham Hotspur	(Belgium) Antwerp
K	(Croatia) Dinamo Zagreb	(Austria) Wolfsberger AC
L	(Germany) TSG Hoffenheim	(Serbia) Red Star Belgrade

=== Champions League group stage third-placed teams ===
Seed	Grp	Team	Pld	W	D	L	GF	GA	GD	Pts	Seeding
1	H	(England) Manchester United	6	3	0	3	15	10	+5	9	Seeded in round of 32 draw
2	F	(Belgium) Club Brugge	6	2	2	2	8	10	−2	8	Seeded in round of 32 draw
3	B	(Ukraine) Shakhtar Donetsk	6	2	2	2	5	12	−7	8	Seeded in round of 32 draw
4	D	(Netherlands) Ajax	6	2	1	3	7	7	0	7	Seeded in round of 32 draw
5	E	(Russia) Krasnodar	6	1	2	3	6	11	−5	5	Unseeded in round of 32 draw
6	A	(Austria) Red Bull Salzburg	6	1	1	4	10	17	−7	4	Unseeded in round of 32 draw
7	G	(Ukraine) Dynamo Kyiv	6	1	1	4	4	13	−9	4	Unseeded in round of 32 draw
8	C	(Greece) Olympiacos	6	1	0	5	2	10	−8	3	Unseeded in round of 32 draw

Source: UEFA
Rules for classification: 1) Points; 2) Goal difference; 3) Goals scored; 4) Away goals scored; 5) Wins; 6) Away wins; 7) Disciplinary points; 8) Club coefficient (UCL Regulations Article 16.04).

== Format ==
Each tie in the knockout phase, apart from the final, was played over two legs, with each team playing one leg at home. The team that scored more goals on aggregate over the two legs advanced to the next round. If the aggregate score was level, the away goals rule was applied, i.e. the team that scored more goals away from home over the two legs advanced. If away goals were also equal, then extra time was played. The away goals rule was again applied after extra time, i.e. if there were goals scored during extra time and the aggregate score was still level, the visiting team advanced by virtue of more away goals scored. If no goals were scored during extra time, the winners were decided by a penalty shoot-out. In the final, which was played as a single match, if the score was level at the end of normal time, extra time was played, followed by a penalty shoot-out if the score was still level. The mechanism of the draws for each round was as follows:

- In the draw for the round of 32, the twelve group winners and the four third-placed teams from the Champions League group stage with the better group records were seeded, and the twelve group runners-up and the other four third-placed teams from the Champions League group stage were unseeded. The seeded teams were drawn against the unseeded teams, with the seeded teams hosting the second leg. Teams from the same group or the same association cannot be drawn against each other.
- In the draws for the round of 16 onwards, there were no seedings, and teams from the same group or the same association could be drawn against each other. As the draws for the quarter-finals and semi-finals were held together before the quarter-finals were played, the identity of the quarter-final winners was not known at the time of the semi-final draw. A draw was also held to determine which semi-final winner was designated as the "home" team for the final (for administrative purposes as it was played at a neutral venue).

On 17 July 2014, the UEFA emergency panel ruled that Ukrainian and Russian clubs would not be drawn against each other "until further notice" due to the political unrest between the countries.

In the knockout phase, teams from the same or nearby cities (Arsenal and Tottenham Hotspur) were not scheduled to play at home on the same day, due to logistics and crowd control. To avoid such scheduling conflicts, UEFA had to make adjustments. For the round of 32, since both teams were seeded and play the second leg at home, the home match of the team that was not domestic cup champions in the qualifying season, or the team with the lower domestic ranking (if neither team were the domestic cup champions, i.e. Tottenham Hotspur for this season), was moved from Thursday to Wednesday. For the round of 16, quarter-finals, and semi-finals, if the two teams were drawn to play at home for the same leg, the order of legs of the tie involving the team with the lowest priority was reversed from the original draw.

== Schedule ==
The schedule was as follows (all draws were held at the UEFA headquarters in Nyon, Switzerland).

Round	Draw date	First leg	Second leg
Round of 32	14 December 2020, 13:00	18 February 2021	25 February 2021
Round of 16	26 February 2021, 13:00	11 March 2021	18 March 2021
Quarter-finals	19 March 2021, 13:00	8 April 2021	15 April 2021
Semi-finals	19 March 2021, 13:00	29 April 2021	6 May 2021
Final	19 March 2021, 13:00	26 May 2021 at Stadion Gdańsk, Gdańsk	

== Bracket ==
Round of 32
(Austria) Wolfsberger AC	1	0	1
(England) Tottenham Hotspur	4	4	8
(Russia) Krasnodar	2	0	2
(Croatia) Dinamo Zagreb	3	1	4
(Ukraine) Dynamo Kyiv	1	1	2
(Belgium) Club Brugge	1	0	1
(Austria) Red Bull Salzburg	0	1	1
(Spain) Villarreal	2	2	4
(Greece) Olympiacos	4	1	5
(Netherlands) PSV Eindhoven	2	2	4
(Portugal) Benfica	1	2	3
(England) Arsenal	1	3	4
(Czech Republic) Slavia Prague	0	2	2
(England) Leicester City	0	0	0
(Belgium) Antwerp	3	2	5
(Scotland) Rangers	4	5	9
(Spain) Granada	2	1	3
(Italy) Napoli	0	2	2
(Norway) Molde	3	2	5
(Germany) TSG Hoffenheim	3	0	3
(Spain) Real Sociedad	0	0	0
(England) Manchester United	4	0	4
(Serbia) Red Star Belgrade	2	1	3
(Italy) Milan (a)	2	1	3
(France) Lille	1	1	2
(Netherlands) Ajax	2	2	4
(Switzerland) Young Boys	4	2	6
(Germany) Bayer Leverkusen	3	0	3
(Portugal) Braga	0	1	1
(Italy) Roma	2	3	5
(Israel) Maccabi Tel Aviv	0	0	0
(Ukraine) Shakhtar Donetsk	2	1	3

Round of 16
(England) Tottenham Hotspur	2	0	2
(Croatia) Dinamo Zagreb (a.e.t.)	0	3	3
(Ukraine) Dynamo Kyiv	0	0	0
(Spain) Villarreal	2	2	4
(Greece) Olympiacos	1	1	2
(England) Arsenal	3	0	3
(Czech Republic) Slavia Prague	1	2	3
(Scotland) Rangers	1	0	1
(Spain) Granada	2	1	3
(Norway) Molde	0	2	2
(England) Manchester United	1	1	2
(Italy) Milan	1	0	1
(Netherlands) Ajax	3	2	5
(Switzerland) Young Boys	0	0	0
(Italy) Roma	3	2	5
(Ukraine) Shakhtar Donetsk	0	1	1

Quarter-finals
(Croatia) Dinamo Zagreb	0	1	1
(Spain) Villarreal	1	2	3
(England) Arsenal	1	4	5
(Czech Republic) Slavia Prague	1	0	1
(Spain) Granada	0	0	0
(England) Manchester United	2	2	4
(Netherlands) Ajax	1	1	2
(Italy) Roma	2	1	3

Semi-finals
(Spain) Villarreal	2	0	2
(England) Arsenal	1	0	1
(England) Manchester United	6	2	8
(Italy) Roma	2	3	5

Final
26 May – Gdańsk
(Spain) Villarreal (p)	1 (11)
(England) Manchester United	1 (10)

== Round of 32 ==
The draw for the round of 32 was held on 14 December 2020, 13:00 CET.

=== Summary ===
The first legs were played on 18 February, and the second legs were played on 24 and 25 February 2021.

Team 1	Agg.	Team 2	1st leg	2nd leg
Wolfsberger AC (Austria)	1–8	(England) Tottenham Hotspur	1–4	0–4
Dynamo Kyiv (Ukraine)	2–1	(Belgium) Club Brugge	1–1	1–0
Real Sociedad (Spain)	0–4	(England) Manchester United	0–4	0–0
Benfica (Portugal)	3–4	(England) Arsenal	1–1	2–3
Red Star Belgrade (Serbia)	3–3 (a)	(Italy) Milan	2–2	1–1
Antwerp (Belgium)	5–9	(Scotland) Rangers	3–4	2–5
Slavia Prague (Czech Republic)	2–0	(England) Leicester City	0–0	2–0
Red Bull Salzburg (Austria)	1–4	(Spain) Villarreal	0–2	1–2
Braga (Portugal)	1–5	(Italy) Roma	0–2	1–3
Krasnodar (Russia)	2–4	(Croatia) Dinamo Zagreb	2–3	0–1
Young Boys (Switzerland)	6–3	(Germany) Bayer Leverkusen	4–3	2–0
Molde (Norway)	5–3	(Germany) TSG Hoffenheim	3–3	2–0
Granada (Spain)	3–2	(Italy) Napoli	2–0	1–2
Maccabi Tel Aviv (Israel)	0–3	(Ukraine) Shakhtar Donetsk	0–2	0–1
Lille (France)	2–4	(Netherlands) Ajax	1–2	1–2
Olympiacos (Greece)	5–4	(Netherlands) PSV Eindhoven	4–2	1–2

=== Matches ===
18 February 2021
18:55

Wolfsberger AC (Austria)	1–4	(England) Tottenham Hotspur
Liendl 55' (pen.)	Report	Son Heung-min 13'; Bale 28'; Lucas 34'; Carlos Vinícius 88'

Puskás Aréna, Budapest, Hungary (Note: The Wolfsberger AC v Tottenham Hotspur match, originally to be played at Wörthersee Stadion, Klagenfurt, instead of Wolfsberger AC regular stadium Lavanttal-Arena, Wolfsberg, was moved to Puskás Aréna, Budapest, Hungary, due to travel restrictions related to the COVID-19 pandemic from the United Kingdom to Austria.)
Attendance: 0 (Note: Due to the COVID-19 pandemic in Europe, the match was played behind closed doors.)
Referee: Ali Palabıyık (Turkey)
24 February 2021
18:00 (17:00 UTC+0)

Tottenham Hotspur (England)	4–0	(Austria) Wolfsberger AC
Alli 11'; Carlos Vinícius 50', 83'; Bale 73'	Report

Tottenham Hotspur Stadium, London
Attendance: 0
Referee: Matej Jug (Slovenia)

Tottenham Hotspur won 8–1 on aggregate.

18 February 2021
16:00 (17:00 UTC+2) (Note: The Dynamo Kyiv v Club Brugge match, originally scheduled at 18:55 (19:55 UTC+2), was moved to 16:00 (17:00 UTC+2), due to the very cold temperatures.)

Dynamo Kyiv (Ukraine)	1–1	(Belgium) Club Brugge
Buyalskyi 62'	Report	Mechele 67'

NSC Olimpiyskiy Stadium, Kyiv
Attendance: 3,284
Referee: Mattias Gestranius (Finland)
25 February 2021
21:00

Club Brugge (Belgium)	0–1	(Ukraine) Dynamo Kyiv
	Report	Buyalskyi 83'

Jan Breydel Stadium, Bruges
Attendance: 0
Referee: Srđan Jovanović (Serbia)

Dynamo Kyiv won 2–1 on aggregate.

18 February 2021
18:55

Real Sociedad (Spain)	0–4	(England) Manchester United
	Report	Fernandes 27', 57'; Rashford 65'; James 90'

Juventus Stadium, Turin, Italy (Note: The Real Sociedad v Manchester United match, originally to be played at Anoeta Stadium, San Sebastián, was moved to Juventus Stadium, Turin, Italy, due to travel restrictions related to the COVID-19 pandemic from the United Kingdom to Spain.)
Attendance: 0
Referee: Sandro Schärer (Switzerland)
25 February 2021
21:00 (20:00 UTC+0)

Manchester United (England)	0–0	(Spain) Real Sociedad
	Report

Old Trafford, Manchester
Attendance: 0
Referee: Lawrence Visser (Belgium)

Manchester United won 4–0 on aggregate.

18 February 2021
21:00

Benfica (Portugal)	1–1	(England) Arsenal
Pizzi 55' (pen.)	Report	Saka 57'

Stadio Olimpico, Rome, Italy (Note: The Benfica v Arsenal tie, originally to be played at Estádio da Luz, Lisbon, and at Emirates Stadium, London, was moved to Stadio Olimpico, Rome, Italy, and Karaiskakis Stadium, Piraeus (Greece), due to travel restrictions related to the COVID-19 pandemic between Portugal and the United Kingdom.)
Attendance: 0
Referee: Cüneyt Çakır (Turkey)
25 February 2021
18:55 (19:55 UTC+2)

Arsenal (England)	3–2	(Portugal) Benfica
Aubameyang 21', 87'; Tierney 67'	Report	Gonçalves 43'; Silva 61'

Karaiskakis Stadium, Piraeus, Greece
Attendance: 0
Referee: Björn Kuipers (Netherlands)

Arsenal won 4–3 on aggregate.

18 February 2021
18:55

Red Star Belgrade (Serbia)	2–2	(Italy) Milan
Kanga 52' (pen.); Pavkov 90+3'	Report	Pankov 42' (o.g.); Hernandez 61' (pen.)

Red Star Stadium, Belgrade
Attendance: 0
Referee: Anastasios Sidiropoulos (Greece)
25 February 2021
21:00

Milan (Italy)	1–1	(Serbia) Red Star Belgrade
Kessié 9' (pen.)	Report	Ben 24'

San Siro, Milan
Attendance: 0
Referee: Jesús Gil Manzano (Spain)

3–3 on aggregate; Milan won on away goals.

18 February 2021
21:00

Antwerp (Belgium)	3–4	(Scotland) Rangers
Avenatti 45'; Refaelov 45+8' (pen.); Hongla 67'	Report	Aribo 39'; Barišić 59' (pen.), 90' (pen.); Kent 83'

Bosuilstadion, Antwerp
Attendance: 0
Referee: Georgi Kabakov (Bulgaria)
25 February 2021
18:55 (17:55 UTC+0)

Rangers (Scotland)	5–2	(Belgium) Antwerp
Morelos 9'; Patterson 46'; Kent 55'; Barišić 79' (pen.); Itten 90+2' (pen.)	Report	Refaelov 32'; Lamkel Zé 57'

Ibrox Stadium, Glasgow
Attendance: 0
Referee: Paweł Raczkowski (Poland)

Rangers won 9–5 on aggregate.

18 February 2021
18:55

Slavia Prague (Czech Republic)	0–0	(England) Leicester City
	Report

Sinobo Stadium, Prague
Attendance: 600
Referee: Marco Guida (Italy)
25 February 2021
21:00 (20:00 UTC+0)

Leicester City (England)	0–2	(Czech Republic) Slavia Prague
	Report	Provod 49'; Sima 79'

King Power Stadium, Leicester
Attendance: 0
Referee: Serdar Gözübüyük (Netherlands)

Slavia Prague won 2–0 on aggregate.

18 February 2021
21:00

Red Bull Salzburg (Austria)	0–2	(Spain) Villarreal
	Report	Alcácer 41'; Niño 71'

Stadion Wals-Siezenheim, Wals-Siezenheim
Attendance: 0
Referee: Andris Treimanis (Latvia)
25 February 2021
18:55

Villarreal (Spain)	2–1	(Austria) Red Bull Salzburg
Gerard 40', 89' (pen.)	Report	Berisha 17'

Estadio de la Cerámica, Villarreal
Attendance: 0
Referee: Felix Zwayer (Germany)

Villarreal won 4–1 on aggregate.

18 February 2021
18:55 (17:55 UTC+0)

Braga (Portugal)	0–2	(Italy) Roma
	Report	Džeko 5'; Mayoral 86'

Estádio Municipal, Braga
Attendance: 0
Referee: István Kovács (Romania)
25 February 2021
21:00

Roma (Italy)	3–1	(Portugal) Braga
Džeko 24'; Pérez 75'; Mayoral 90+1'	Report	Cristante 88' (o.g.)

Stadio Olimpico, Rome
Attendance: 0
Referee: Andreas Ekberg (Sweden)

Roma won 5–1 on aggregate.

18 February 2021
18:55 (20:55 UTC+3)

Krasnodar (Russia)	2–3	(Croatia) Dinamo Zagreb
Berg 28'; Claesson 69'	Report	Petković 15', 54'; Atiemwen 75'

Krasnodar Stadium, Krasnodar
Attendance: 9,897
Referee: Bartosz Frankowski (Poland)
25 February 2021
21:00

Dinamo Zagreb (Croatia)	1–0	(Russia) Krasnodar
Oršić 31'	Report

Stadion Maksimir, Zagreb
Attendance: 0
Referee: Halil Umut Meler (Turkey)

Dinamo Zagreb won 4–2 on aggregate.

18 February 2021
18:55

Young Boys (Switzerland)	4–3	(Germany) Bayer Leverkusen
Fassnacht 3'; Siebatcheu 19', 89'; Elia 44'	Report	Schick 49', 52'; Diaby 68'

Stadion Wankdorf, Bern
Attendance: 0
Referee: Antonio Mateu Lahoz (Spain)
25 February 2021
21:00

Bayer Leverkusen (Germany)	0–2	(Switzerland) Young Boys
	Report	Siebatcheu 48'; Fassnacht 86'

BayArena, Leverkusen
Attendance: 0
Referee: Davide Massa (Italy)

Young Boys won 6–3 on aggregate.

18 February 2021
21:00

Molde (Norway)	3–3	(Germany) TSG Hoffenheim
Ellingsen 41'; Andersen 70'; Fofana 74'	Report	Dabbur 8', 28'; Baumgartner 45+3'

Estadio de la Cerámica, Villarreal, Spain (Note: Molde's round of 32 home match, originally to be played at Aker Stadion, Molde, was moved to Estadio de la Cerámica, Villarreal, Spain, and their round of 16 home match was played at Puskás Aréna, Budapest, Hungary, due to the quarantine restrictions in response to the COVID-19 pandemic in Norway.)
Attendance: 0
Referee: Stéphanie Frappart (France)
25 February 2021
18:55

TSG Hoffenheim (Germany)	0–2	(Norway) Molde
	Report	Andersen 20', 90+5'

Rhein-Neckar-Arena, Sinsheim
Attendance: 0
Referee: Aleksei Kulbakov (Belarus)

Molde won 5–3 on aggregate.

18 February 2021
21:00

Granada (Spain)	2–0	(Italy) Napoli
Herrera 19'; Kenedy 21'	Report

Nuevo Los Cármenes, Granada
Attendance: 0
Referee: Sergei Karasev (Russia)
25 February 2021
18:55

Napoli (Italy)	2–1	(Spain) Granada
Zieliński 3'; Fabián 59'	Report	Montoro 25'

Stadio San Paolo, Naples
Attendance: 0
Referee: Daniel Siebert (Germany)

Granada won 3–2 on aggregate.

18 February 2021
21:00 (22:00 UTC+2)

Maccabi Tel Aviv (Israel)	0–2	(Ukraine) Shakhtar Donetsk
	Report	Alan Patrick 31'; Tetê 90+3'

Bloomfield Stadium, Tel Aviv
Attendance: 0
Referee: François Letexier (France)
25 February 2021
18:55 (19:55 UTC+2)

Shakhtar Donetsk (Ukraine)	1–0	(Israel) Maccabi Tel Aviv
Moraes 67' (pen.)	Report

NSC Olimpiyskiy Stadium, Kyiv (Note: Shakhtar Donetsk played their home matches at NSC Olimpiyskiy Stadium, Kyiv, instead of their regular stadium Donbas Arena, Donetsk, due to the war conditions in Eastern Ukraine.)
Attendance: 10,217
Referee: José María Sánchez Martínez (Spain)

Shakhtar Donetsk won 3–0 on aggregate.

18 February 2021
21:00

Lille (France)	1–2	(Netherlands) Ajax
Weah 72'	Report	Tadić 87' (pen.); Brobbey 89'

Stade Pierre-Mauroy, Villeneuve-d'Ascq
Attendance: 0
Referee: Ivan Kružliak (Slovakia)
25 February 2021
18:55

Ajax (Netherlands)	2–1	(France) Lille
Klaassen 15'; Neres 88'	Report	Yazıcı 78' (pen.)

Johan Cruyff Arena, Amsterdam
Attendance: 0
Referee: Willie Collum (Scotland)

Ajax won 4–2 on aggregate.

18 February 2021
18:55 (19:55 UTC+2)

Olympiacos (Greece)	4–2	(Netherlands) PSV Eindhoven
Bouchalakis 9'; M'Vila 37'; El-Arabi 45+2'; Masouras 83'	Report	Zahavi 14', 40'

Karaiskakis Stadium, Piraeus
Attendance: 0
Referee: Andreas Ekberg (Sweden)
25 February 2021
21:00

PSV Eindhoven (Netherlands)	2–1	(Greece) Olympiacos
Zahavi 23', 44'	Report	Hassan 88'

Philips Stadion, Eindhoven
Attendance: 0
Referee: Clément Turpin (France)

Olympiacos won 5–4 on aggregate.

== Round of 16 ==
The draw for the round of 16 was held on 26 February 2021, 13:00 CET.

=== Summary ===
The first legs were played on 11 March, and the second legs were played on 18 March 2021.

Team 1	Agg.	Team 2	1st leg	2nd leg
Ajax (Netherlands)	5–0	(Switzerland) Young Boys	3–0	2–0
Dynamo Kyiv (Ukraine)	0–4	(Spain) Villarreal	0–2	0–2
Roma (Italy)	5–1	(Ukraine) Shakhtar Donetsk	3–0	2–1
Olympiacos (Greece)	2–3	(England) Arsenal	1–3	1–0
Tottenham Hotspur (England)	2–3 (Note: Order of legs between Tottenham Hotspur and Dinamo Zagreb were reversed after original draw, in order to avoid a scheduling conflict with the Arsenal v Olympiacos second leg in the same city on 18 March, as Arsenal were the domestic cup winners and given higher priority over Tottenham Hotspur.)	(Croatia) Dinamo Zagreb	2–0	0–3 (a.e.t.)
Manchester United (England)	2–1	(Italy) Milan	1–1	1–0
Slavia Prague (Czech Republic)	3–1	(Scotland) Rangers	1–1	2–0
Granada (Spain)	3–2	(Norway) Molde	2–0	1–2

=== Matches ===
11 March 2021
18:55

Ajax (Netherlands)	3–0	(Switzerland) Young Boys
Klaassen 62'; Tadić 82'; Brobbey 90+2'	Report

Johan Cruyff Arena, Amsterdam
Attendance: 0
Referee: Marco Guida (Italy)
18 March 2021
21:00

Young Boys (Switzerland)	0–2	(Netherlands) Ajax
	Report	Neres 21'; Tadić 49' (pen.)

Stadion Wankdorf, Bern
Attendance: 0
Referee: Bobby Madden (Scotland)

Ajax won 5–0 on aggregate.

11 March 2021
18:55 (19:55 UTC+2)

Dynamo Kyiv (Ukraine)	0–2	(Spain) Villarreal
	Report	Torres 30'; Albiol 52'

NSC Olimpiyskiy Stadium, Kyiv
Attendance: 12,751
Referee: Michael Oliver (England)
18 March 2021
21:00

Villarreal (Spain)	2–0	(Ukraine) Dynamo Kyiv
Gerard 13', 36'	Report

Estadio de la Cerámica, Villarreal
Attendance: 0
Referee: Andreas Ekberg (Sweden)

Villarreal won 4–0 on aggregate.

11 March 2021
21:00

Roma (Italy)	3–0	(Ukraine) Shakhtar Donetsk
Pellegrini 23'; El Shaarawy 73'; Mancini 77'	Report

Stadio Olimpico, Rome
Attendance: 0
Referee: Artur Soares Dias (Portugal)
18 March 2021
18:55 (19:55 UTC+2)

Shakhtar Donetsk (Ukraine)	1–2	(Italy) Roma
Moraes 59'	Report	Mayoral 48', 72'

NSC Olimpiyskiy Stadium, Kyiv
Attendance: 0
Referee: Antonio Mateu Lahoz (Spain)

Roma won 5–1 on aggregate.

11 March 2021
21:00 (22:00 UTC+2)

Olympiacos (Greece)	1–3	(England) Arsenal
El-Arabi 58'	Report	Ødegaard 34'; Gabriel 80'; Elneny 85'

Karaiskakis Stadium, Piraeus
Attendance: 0
Referee: Daniel Siebert (Germany)
18 March 2021
18:55 (17:55 UTC+0)

Arsenal (England)	0–1	(Greece) Olympiacos
	Report	El-Arabi 51'

Emirates Stadium, London
Attendance: 0
Referee: Carlos del Cerro Grande (Spain)

Arsenal won 3–2 on aggregate.

11 March 2021
21:00 (20:00 UTC+0)

Tottenham Hotspur (England)	2–0	(Croatia) Dinamo Zagreb
Kane 25', 70'	Report

Tottenham Hotspur Stadium, London
Attendance: 0
Referee: Serdar Gözübüyük (Netherlands)
18 March 2021
18:55

Dinamo Zagreb (Croatia)	3–0 (a.e.t.)	(England) Tottenham Hotspur
Oršić 62', 83', 106'	Report

Stadion Maksimir, Zagreb
Attendance: 0
Referee: Davide Massa (Italy)

Dinamo Zagreb won 3–2 on aggregate.

11 March 2021
18:55 (17:55 UTC+0)

Manchester United (England)	1–1	(Italy) Milan
Amad 50'	Report	Kjær 90+2'

Old Trafford, Manchester
Attendance: 0
Referee: Slavko Vinčić (Slovenia)
18 March 2021
21:00

Milan (Italy)	0–1	(England) Manchester United
	Report	Pogba 49'

San Siro, Milan
Attendance: 0
Referee: Felix Brych (Germany)

Manchester United won 2–1 on aggregate.

11 March 2021
18:55

Slavia Prague (Czech Republic)	1–1	(Scotland) Rangers
Stanciu 7'	Report	Helander 36'

Sinobo Stadium, Prague
Attendance: 300
Referee: Ovidiu Hațegan (Romania)
18 March 2021
21:00 (20:00 UTC+0)

Rangers (Scotland)	0–2	(Czech Republic) Slavia Prague
	Report	Olayinka 14'; Stanciu 74'

Ibrox Stadium, Glasgow
Attendance: 0
Referee: Orel Grinfeld (Israel)

Slavia Prague won 3–1 on aggregate.

11 March 2021
21:00

Granada (Spain)	2–0	(Norway) Molde
Molina 26'; Soldado 76'	Report

Nuevo Los Cármenes, Granada
Attendance: 0
Referee: Paweł Raczkowski (Poland)
18 March 2021
18:55

Molde (Norway)	2–1	(Spain) Granada
Vallejo 29' (o.g.); Hestad 90' (pen.)	Report	Soldado 72'

Puskás Aréna, Budapest, Hungary
Attendance: 0
Referee: Srđan Jovanović (Serbia)

Granada won 3–2 on aggregate.

== Quarter-finals ==
The draw for the quarter-finals was held on 19 March 2021, 13:00 CET.

=== Summary ===
The first legs were played on 8 April, and the second legs were played on 15 April 2021.

Team 1	Agg.	Team 2	1st leg	2nd leg
Granada (Spain)	0–4	(England) Manchester United	0–2	0–2
Arsenal (England)	5–1	(Czech Republic) Slavia Prague	1–1	4–0
Ajax (Netherlands)	2–3	(Italy) Roma	1–2	1–1
Dinamo Zagreb (Croatia)	1–3	(Spain) Villarreal	0–1	1–2

=== Matches ===
8 April 2021
21:00

Granada (Spain)	0–2	(England) Manchester United
	Report	Rashford 31'; Fernandes 90' (pen.)

Nuevo Los Cármenes, Granada
Attendance: 0
Referee: Artur Soares Dias (Portugal)
15 April 2021
21:00 (20:00 UTC+1)

Manchester United (England)	2–0	(Spain) Granada
Cavani 6'; Vallejo 90' (o.g.)	Report

Old Trafford, Manchester
Attendance: 0
Referee: István Kovács (Romania)

Manchester United won 4–0 on aggregate.

8 April 2021
21:00 (20:00 UTC+1)

Arsenal (England)	1–1	(Czech Republic) Slavia Prague
Pépé 86'	Report	Holeš 90+4'

Emirates Stadium, London
Attendance: 0
Referee: Andreas Ekberg (Sweden)
15 April 2021
21:00

Slavia Prague (Czech Republic)	0–4	(England) Arsenal
	Report	Pépé 18'; Lacazette 21' (pen.), 77'; Saka 24'

Sinobo Stadium, Prague
Attendance: 750
Referee: Cüneyt Çakır (Turkey)

Arsenal won 5–1 on aggregate.

8 April 2021
21:00

Ajax (Netherlands)	1–2	(Italy) Roma
Klaassen 39'	Report	Pellegrini 57'; Ibañez 87'

Johan Cruyff Arena, Amsterdam
Attendance: 0
Referee: Sergei Karasev (Russia)
15 April 2021
21:00

Roma (Italy)	1–1	(Netherlands) Ajax
Džeko 72'	Report	Brobbey 49'

Stadio Olimpico, Rome
Attendance: 0
Referee: Anthony Taylor (England)

Roma won 3–2 on aggregate.

8 April 2021
21:00

Dinamo Zagreb (Croatia)	0–1	(Spain) Villarreal
	Report	Gerard 44' (pen.)

Stadion Maksimir, Zagreb
Attendance: 0
Referee: Daniel Siebert (Germany)
15 April 2021
21:00

Villarreal (Spain)	2–1	(Croatia) Dinamo Zagreb
Alcácer 36'; Gerard 43'	Report	Oršić 74'

Estadio de la Cerámica, Villarreal
Attendance: 0
Referee: Danny Makkelie (Netherlands)

Villarreal won 3–1 on aggregate.

== Semi-finals ==
The draw for the semi-finals was held on 19 March 2021, 13:00 CET, after the quarter-final draw.

=== Summary ===
The first legs were played on 29 April, and the second legs were played on 6 May 2021.

Team 1	Agg.	Team 2	1st leg	2nd leg
Manchester United (England)	8–5	(Italy) Roma	6–2	2–3
Villarreal (Spain)	2–1	(England) Arsenal	2–1	0–0

=== Matches ===
29 April 2021
21:00 (20:00 UTC+1)

Manchester United (England)	6–2	(Italy) Roma
Fernandes 9', 71' (pen.); Cavani 48', 64'; Pogba 75'; Greenwood 86'	Report	Pellegrini 15' (pen.); Džeko 34'

Old Trafford, Manchester
Attendance: 0
Referee: Carlos del Cerro Grande (Spain)
6 May 2021
21:00

Roma (Italy)	3–2	(England) Manchester United
Džeko 57'; Cristante 60'; Telles 83' (o.g.)	Report	Cavani 39', 68'

Stadio Olimpico, Rome
Attendance: 0
Referee: Felix Brych (Germany)

Manchester United won 8–5 on aggregate.

29 April 2021
21:00

Villarreal (Spain)	2–1	(England) Arsenal
Trigueros 5'; Albiol 29'	Report	Pépé 73' (pen.)

Estadio de la Cerámica, Villarreal
Attendance: 0
Referee: Artur Soares Dias (Portugal)
6 May 2021
21:00 (20:00 UTC+1)

Arsenal (England)	0–0	(Spain) Villarreal
	Report

Emirates Stadium, London
Attendance: 0
Referee: Slavko Vinčić (Slovenia)

Villarreal won 2–1 on aggregate.

== Final ==
The final was played on 26 May 2021 at the Stadion Gdańsk in Gdańsk. A draw was held on 19 March 2021, after the quarter-final and semi-final draws, to determine the "home" team for administrative purposes.

26 May 2021
21:00

Villarreal (Spain)	1–1 (a.e.t.)	(England) Manchester United
Gerard 29'	Report	Cavani 55'
Penalties
Gerard (penalty scored); Raba (penalty scored); Alcácer (penalty scored); Moreno (penalty scored); Parejo (penalty scored); Gómez (penalty scored); Albiol (penalty scored); Coquelin (penalty scored); Gaspar (penalty scored); Torres (penalty scored); Rulli (penalty scored)	11–10	(penalty scored) Mata; (penalty scored) Telles; (penalty scored) Fernandes; (penalty scored) Rashford; (penalty scored) Cavani; (penalty scored) Fred; (penalty scored) James; (penalty scored) Shaw; (penalty scored) Tuanzebe; (penalty scored) Lindelöf; (penalty missed) De Gea

Stadion Gdańsk, Gdańsk
Attendance: 9,412
Referee: Clément Turpin (France)
