= Vladyslav Kabayev =

Ukrainian footballer

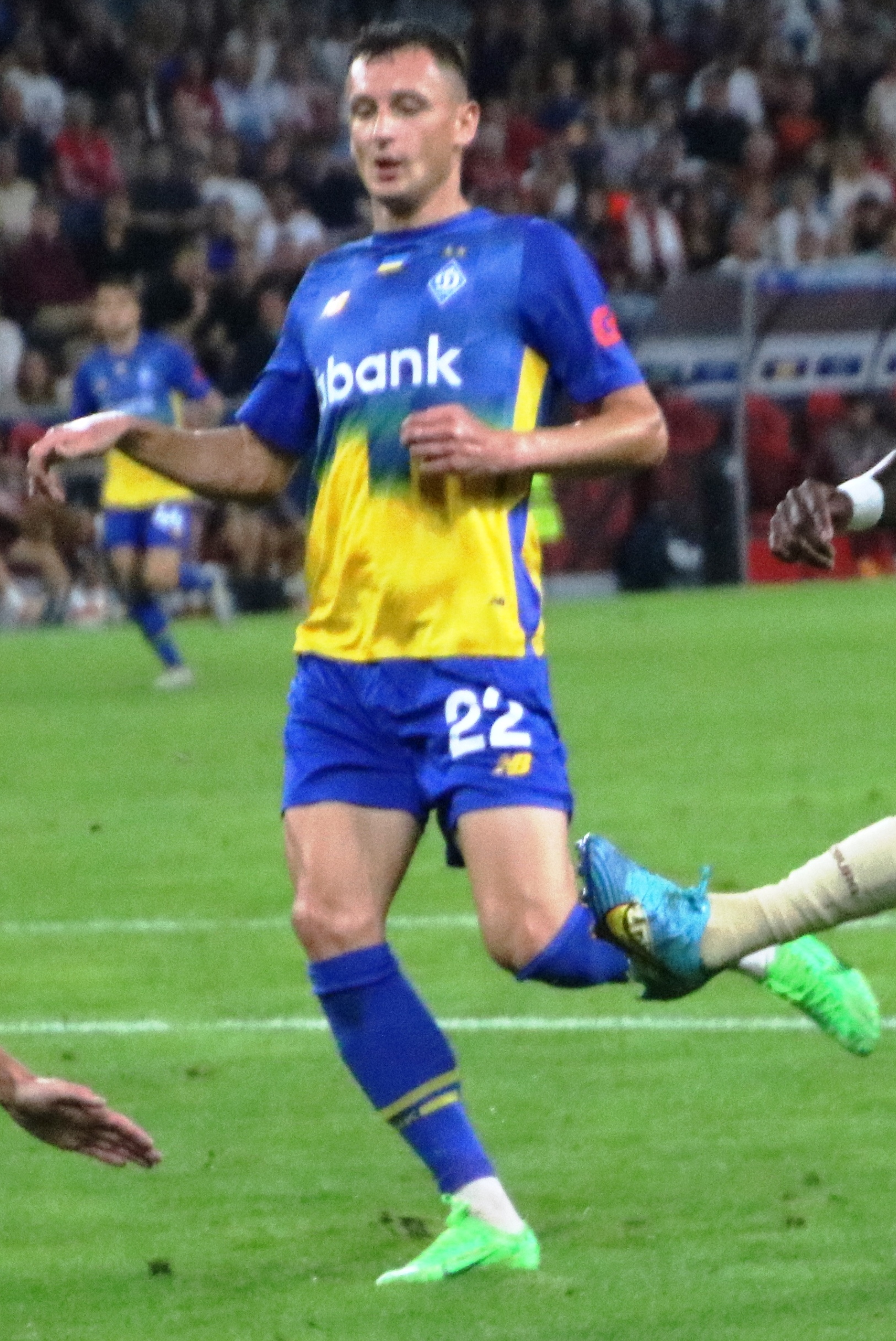
- Kabayev in 2024 with Dynamo Kyiv

Personal information
- Full name: Vladyslav Oleksandrovych Kabayev
- Date of birth: 1 September 1995 (age 31)
- Place of birth: Odesa, Ukraine
- Height: 1.76 m (5 ft 9 in)
- Position: Striker

Team information
- Current team: Dynamo Kyiv
- Number: 22

Youth career
- 2008–2011: Chornomorets Odesa

Senior career*
Years	Team	Apps	(Gls)
2011–2017	Chornomorets Odesa	52	(2)
2011	→ Chornomorets-2 Odesa	5	(0)
2017–2022	Zorya Luhansk	98	(9)
2022–	Dynamo Kyiv	98	(9)

International career^{‡}
2012	Ukraine U17	2	(0)
2014–2015	Ukraine U20	11	(0)
2016	Ukraine U21	5	(0)
2024–	Ukraine	3	(0)
- * Club domestic league appearances and goals as of 23 October 2026 ‡ National team caps and goals as of 11 June 2025

Vladyslav Oleksandrovych Kabayev (Ukrainian: Владислав Олександрович Кабаєв; born 1 September 1995) is a Ukrainian professional footballer who plays as a striker for Ukrainian Premier League club Dynamo Kyiv and the Ukraine national team.

== Club career ==
=== Early years ===
Kabayev is a product of the Chornomorets Odesa youth system.

=== Chornomorets Odesa ===
He made his debut for Chornomorets Odesa against Dynamo Kyiv on 30 August 2014 in the Ukrainian Premier League.

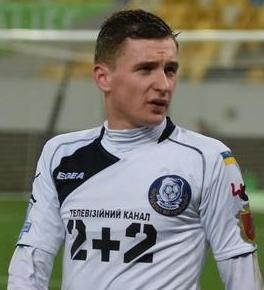
Kabayev in 2016 as Chornomorets Odesa player

== International career ==
On September 7, 2024, Kabayev made his debut as part of the national team of Ukraine in the 2024–25 UEFA Nations League match against the national team of Albania.

== Career statistics ==
=== Club ===
As of match played 27 October 2026

Appearances and goals by club, season and competition
Club	Season	League			Cup		Europe		Other		Total	
Club	Season	Division	Apps	Goals	Apps	Goals	Apps	Goals	Apps	Goals	Apps	Goals
Chornomorets Odesa	2011–12	Ukrainian Premier League	0	0	0	0	—		—		0	0
Chornomorets Odesa	2014–15	Ukrainian Premier League	9	0	1	0	1 (Note: Appearances in UEFA Europa League)	0	—		11	0
Chornomorets Odesa	2015–16	Ukrainian Premier League	18	1	0	0	—		—		18	1
Chornomorets Odesa	2016–17	Ukrainian Premier League	25	1	1	0	—		—		26	1
Chornomorets Odesa	Total		52	2	2	0	1	0	—		55	2
Chornomorets-2 Odesa	2011–12	Ukrainian Second League	5	0	—		—		—		5	0
Zorya Luhansk	2017–18	Ukrainian Premier League	13	0	0	0	6	0	—		19	0
Zorya Luhansk	2018–19	Ukrainian Premier League	22	1	3	0	4	0	—		29	1
Zorya Luhansk	2019–20	Ukrainian Premier League	29	7	1	0	4	0	—		34	7
Zorya Luhansk	2020–21	Ukrainian Premier League	21	7	4	0	6	1	—		31	8
Zorya Luhansk	2021–22	Ukrainian Premier League	11	1	0	0	5 (Note: Two appearances in UEFA Europa League, three appearances in UEFA Conference League)	0	—		16	1
Zorya Luhansk	2022–23	Ukrainian Premier League	1	0	0	0	2 (Note: Appearances in UEFA Conference League)	0	—		3	0
Zorya Luhansk	Total		97	16	8	0	27	1	—		132	17
Dynamo Kyiv	2022–23	Ukrainian Premier League	21	0	0	0	6	0	—		27	0
Dynamo Kyiv	2023–24	Ukrainian Premier League	25	5	0	0	1	0	—		26	5
Dynamo Kyiv	2024–25	Ukrainian Premier League	30	2	4	0	14 (Note: Six appearances and one goal in UEFA Champions League, eight appearances and one goal in UEFA Europa League)	2	—		48	4
Dynamo Kyiv	2025–26	Ukrainian Premier League	13	2	2	0	10 (Note: Four appearances in UEFA Champions League, two appearances in UEFA Europa League, four appearances and two goals in UEFA Conference League)	2	—		25	4
Dynamo Kyiv	2026–27	Ukrainian Premier League	9	0	1	0	3 (Note: One appearance in UEFA Europa League, two appearances in UEFA Conference League)	0	—		13	0
Dynamo Kyiv	Total		98	9	7	0	34	4	—		139	13
Career total			252	27	17	0	62	5	0	0	331	32

=== International ===
As of match played 10 June 2025

Appearances and goals by national team and year
National team	Year	Apps	Goals
Ukraine	2024	1	0
Ukraine	2025	2	0
Total		3	0
