= 2020–21 UEFA Champions League =

European football tournament

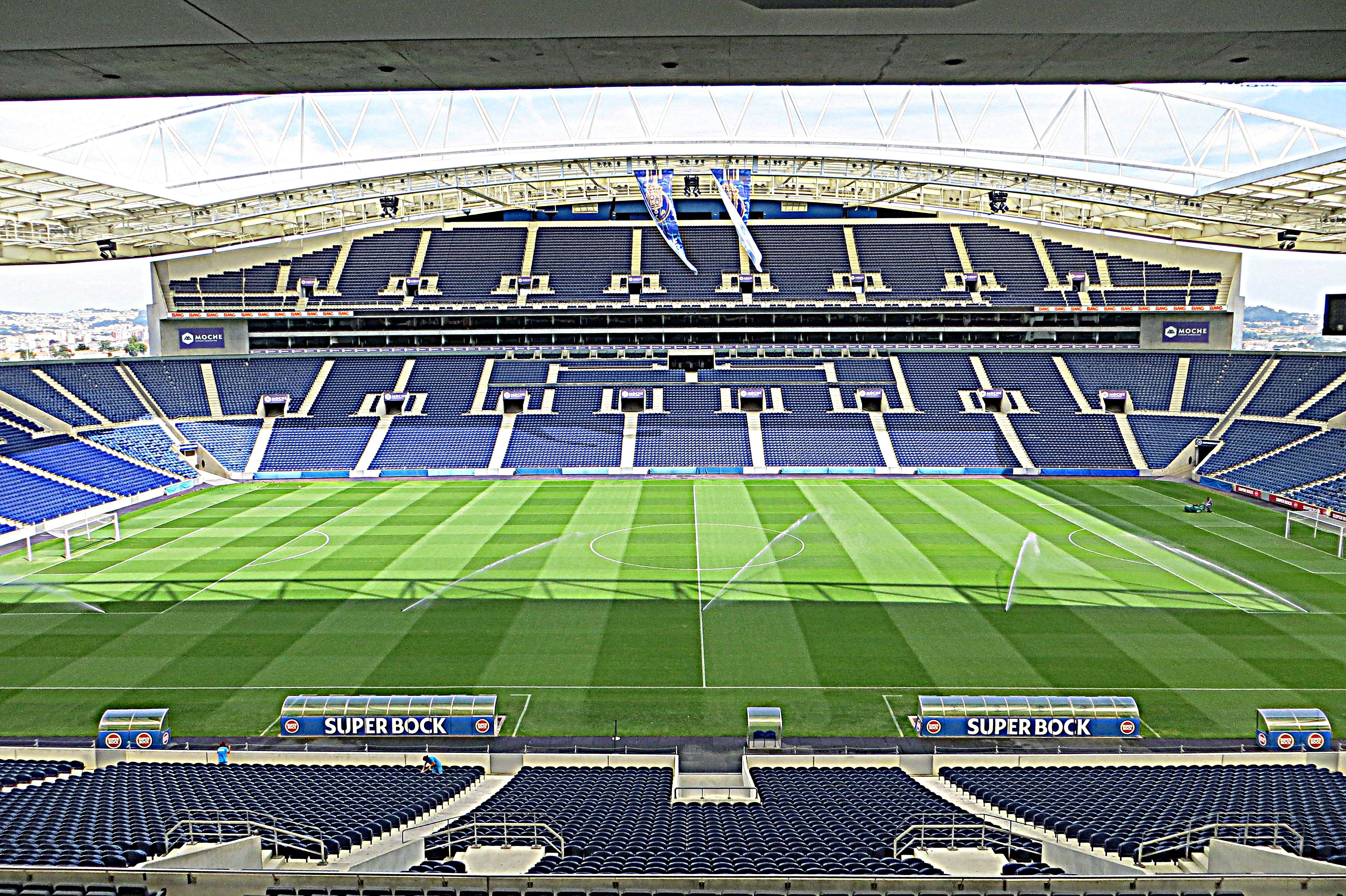
- The Estádio do Dragão in Porto hosted the final.

Tournament details
- Dates: Qualifying: 8 August 2020 – 30 September 2020; Competition proper: 20 October 2020 – 29 May 2021
- Teams: Competition proper: 32; Total: 79 (from 54 associations)

Final positions
- Champions: (England) Chelsea (2nd title)
- Runners-up: (England) Manchester City

Tournament statistics
- Matches played: 125
- Goals scored: 366 (2.93 per match)
- Attendance: 180,049 (1,440 per match)
- Top scorer(s): Erling Haaland (Borussia Dortmund); 10 goals
- Best players: Goalkeeper: Édouard Mendy (Chelsea); Defender: Rúben Dias (Manchester City); Midfielder: N'Golo Kanté (Chelsea); Forward: Erling Haaland (Borussia Dortmund)

The 2020–21 UEFA Champions League was the 66th season of Europe's premier club football tournament organised by UEFA, and the 29th season since it was renamed from the European Champion Clubs' Cup to the UEFA Champions League.

Chelsea defeated Manchester City 1–0 in the final, which was played at the Estádio do Dragão in Porto, Portugal, for their second European Cup title. The Atatürk Olympic Stadium in Istanbul, Turkey, was originally appointed to host the 2020 UEFA Champions League Final, but it was moved due to the COVID-19 pandemic in Europe to the Estádio da Luz in Lisbon. Istanbul was again appointed to host the final of the 2021 edition, but was eventually moved to Estádio do Dragão after Turkey was placed on the United Kingdom's red list for tourists and hosting it in England was ruled out.

Bayern Munich were the defending champions, but they were eliminated in the quarter-finals by Paris Saint-Germain, whom they had beaten in the previous year's final. As the winners of the 2020–21 UEFA Champions League, Chelsea played against Villarreal, the winners of the 2020–21 UEFA Europa League, in the 2021 UEFA Super Cup. They were also the European entry for the 2021 FIFA Club World Cup. Since they had already qualified to the 2021–22 UEFA Champions League group stage through their league performance, the berth originally reserved for the Champions League title holders has been transferred to the Champions of the 2020–21 Süper Lig, Beşiktaş, the 11th ranked association according to the next season access-list.

The 2020–21 season was the last season of UEFA European club competitions to feature the away goals rule.

== Association team allocation ==
A total of 79 teams from 54 of the 55 UEFA member associations participate in the 2020–21 UEFA Champions League (the exception being Liechtenstein, which does not organise a domestic league). The association ranking based on the UEFA country coefficients is used to determine the number of participating teams for each association:

- Associations 1–4 each have four teams qualify.
- Associations 5–6 each have three teams qualify.
- Associations 7–15 each have two teams qualify.
- Associations 16–55 (except Liechtenstein) each have one team qualify.
- The winners of the 2019–20 UEFA Champions League and 2019–20 UEFA Europa League are each given an additional entry if they do not qualify for the 2020–21 UEFA Champions League through their domestic leagues. However, the Champions League and Europa League title holders have qualified through their domestic leagues, meaning the two additional entries are not necessary for this season.

=== Association ranking ===
For the 2020–21 UEFA Champions League, the associations are allocated places according to their 2019 UEFA country coefficients, which takes into account their performance in European competitions from 2014–15 to 2018–19.

Apart from the allocation based on the country coefficients, associations may have additional teams participating in the Champions League, as noted below:

- (UCL) – Additional berth for UEFA Champions League title holders
- (UEL) – Additional berth for UEFA Europa League title holders

Association ranking for 2020–21 UEFA Champions League

Rank	Association	Coeff.	Teams	Notes
1	Spain	103.569	4	
2	England	85.462	4	
3	Italy	74.725	4	
4	Germany	71.927	4	
5	France	58.498	3	
6	Russia	50.549	3	
7	Portugal	48.232	2	
8	Belgium	39.900	2	
9	Ukraine	38.900	2	
10	Turkey	34.600	2	
11	Netherlands	32.433	2	
12	Austria	31.250	2	
13	Czech Republic	28.675	2	
14	Greece	27.600	2	
15	Croatia	27.375	2	
16	Denmark	27.025	1	
17	Switzerland	26.900	1	
18	Cyprus	24.925	1	
19	Serbia	22.250	1	

Rank	Association	Coeff.	Teams	Notes
20	Scotland	22.125	1	
21	Belarus	21.875	1	
22	Sweden	20.900	1	
23	Norway	20.200	1	
24	Kazakhstan	19.250	1	
25	Poland	19.250	1	
26	Azerbaijan	19.000	1	
27	Israel	18.625	1	
28	Bulgaria	17.500	1	
29	Romania	15.950	1	
30	Slovakia	15.625	1	
31	Slovenia	15.000	1	
32	Liechtenstein	13.500	0	
33	Hungary	10.500	1	
34	North Macedonia	8.000	1	
35	Moldova	7.750	1	
36	Albania	7.500	1	
37	Republic of Ireland	7.450	1	
38	Finland	7.275	1	

Rank	Association	Coeff.	Teams	Notes
39	Iceland	7.250	1	
40	Bosnia and Herzegovina	7.125	1	
41	Lithuania	6.750	1	
42	Latvia	5.625	1	
43	Luxembourg	5.500	1	
44	Armenia	5.250	1	
45	Malta	5.125	1	
46	Estonia	5.000	1	
47	Georgia	4.750	1	
48	Wales	4.125	1	
49	Montenegro	4.125	1	
50	Faroe Islands	4.000	1	
51	Gibraltar	4.000	1	
52	Northern Ireland	3.875	1	
53	Kosovo	2.500	1	
54	Andorra	1.831	1	
55	San Marino	0.666	1	

=== Distribution ===
The following is the access list for this season.

Access list for 2020–21 UEFA Champions League
		Teams entering in this round	Teams advancing from previous round
Preliminary round (4 teams)		4 champions from associations 52–55	
First qualifying round (34 teams)		33 champions from associations 18–51 (except Liechtenstein)	1 winner from preliminary round
Second qualifying round	Champions Path (20 teams)	3 champions from associations 15–17	17 winners from first qualifying round
Second qualifying round	League Path (6 teams)	6 runners-up from associations 10–15	
Third qualifying round	Champions Path (10 teams)		10 winners from second qualifying round (Champions Path)
Third qualifying round	League Path (6 teams)	3 runners-up from associations 7–9	3 winners from second qualifying round (League Path)
Play-off round	Champions Path (8 teams)	3 champions from associations 12–14	5 winners from third qualifying round (Champions Path)
Play-off round	League Path (4 teams)	1 third-placed team from association 6	3 winners from third qualifying round (League Path)
Group stage (32 teams)		11 champions from associations 1–11; 6 runners-up from associations 1–6; 5 third-placed teams from associations 1–5; 4 fourth-placed teams from associations 1–4	4 winners from play-off round (Champions Path); 2 winners from play-off round (League Path)
Knockout phase (16 teams)			8 group winners from group stage; 8 group runners-up from group stage

Changes were made to the default access list since the Champions League title holders, Bayern Munich, and the Europa League title holders, Sevilla, which were guaranteed berths in the Champions League group stage, already qualified for the Champions League group stage via their domestic leagues. However, as a result of schedule delays to both the 2019–20 and 2020–21 European seasons due to the COVID-19 pandemic, the 2020–21 European season started before the conclusion of the 2019–20 European season. Therefore, the changes to the access list that should be made based on the Champions League and Europa League title holders could not be certain until matches of the earlier qualifying rounds had been played and/or their draws had been made. UEFA used "adaptive re-balancing" to change the access list once the berths for the Champions League and Europa League title holders were determined, and rounds which had already been drawn or played by the time the title holders were determined would not be impacted (Regulations Article 3.04). The following changes were made:

- At the time when the draws for the first qualifying round and second qualifying round (Champions Path) were held on 9 and 10 August 2020, it was not certain whether the Champions League title holder berth would be vacated as one of the eight quarter-finalists of the 2019–20 UEFA Champions League, Lyon, did not qualify for the 2020–21 UEFA Champions League group stage via their domestic league. Therefore, these draws proceeded as normal per the default access list, and the matches drawn, which were played on 18–19 and 25–26 August 2020, were not changed even though after the semi-finals of the 2019–20 UEFA Champions League, which were played on 18–19 August 2020, it was confirmed both finalists, Bayern Munich and Paris Saint-Germain, already qualified for the 2020–21 UEFA Champions League group stage via their domestic leagues, meaning the Champions League title holder berth would be vacated. As a result, "adaptive re-balancing" started from the third qualifying round (Champions Path), whose draw was held on 31 August 2020, and the following changes to the access list were made:
  - The champions of association 11 (Netherlands), Ajax, entered the group stage instead of the play-off round (Champions Path).
  - The champions of associations 13 and 14 (Czech Republic and Greece), Slavia Prague and Olympiacos, entered the play-off round (Champions Path) instead of the third qualifying round (Champions Path).
- At the time when the draw for the second qualifying round (League Path) was held on 10 August 2020, it was not certain whether the Europa League title holder berth would be vacated as four of the quarter-finalists of the 2019–20 UEFA Europa League, Wolverhampton Wanderers, Bayer Leverkusen, Copenhagen and Basel, did not qualify for the 2020–21 UEFA Champions League group stage via their domestic leagues. Therefore, this draw proceeded as normal per the default access list, and the matches drawn, which were played on 25–26 August 2020, were not changed even though after the quarter-finals of the 2019–20 UEFA Europa League, which were played on 10–11 August 2020, it was confirmed all four semi-finalists, Sevilla, Manchester United, Internazionale and Shakhtar Donetsk, already qualified for the 2020–21 UEFA Champions League group stage via their domestic leagues, meaning the Europa League title holder berth would be vacated. As a result, "adaptive re-balancing" started from the third qualifying round (League Path), whose draw was held on 31 August 2020, and the following changes to the access list were made:
  - The third-placed team of association 5 (France), Rennes, entered the group stage instead of the third qualifying round (League Path).
  - The third-placed team of association 6 (Russia), Krasnodar, entered the play-off round (League Path) instead of the third qualifying round (League Path).

=== Teams ===
In early April 2020, UEFA announced that due to the COVID-19 pandemic in Europe, the deadline for entering the tournament had been postponed until further notice. UEFA also sent a letter to all member associations that domestic leagues must be completed in full without ending prematurely in order to qualify for European competitions. After meeting with the 55 UEFA associations on 21 April 2020, UEFA strongly recommended them to finish domestic top league and cup competitions, although in some special cases where it is not possible, UEFA would develop guidelines concerning participation in its club competitions in case of a cancelled league or cup. After the UEFA Executive Committee meeting on 23 April 2020, UEFA announced that if a domestic competition is prematurely terminated for legitimate reasons in accordance with conditions related to public health or economic problems, the national associations concerned are required to select their participating teams for the 2020–21 UEFA club competitions based on sporting merit in the 2019–20 domestic competitions, and UEFA reserves the right to refuse their admission if UEFA deems the termination of the competitions not legitimate, or the selection procedure not objective, transparent and non-discriminatory, or the team is perceived by the public as qualifying unfairly. A suspended domestic competition may also be restarted with a different format from the original one in a manner which would still facilitate qualification on sporting merit. All leagues should communicate to UEFA by 25 May 2020 whether they intend to restart their competitions, but this deadline was later extended. On 17 June 2020, UEFA announced that associations must enter their teams by 3 August 2020.

The labels in the parentheses show how each team qualified for the place of its starting round:

- TH: Champions League title holders
- EL: Europa League title holders
- 1st, 2nd, 3rd, 4th, etc.: League positions of the previous season
- Abd-: League positions of abandoned season due to the COVID-19 pandemic in Europe as determined by the national association; all teams are subject to approval by UEFA as per the guidelines for entry to European competitions in response to the COVID-19 pandemic.

The second qualifying round, third qualifying round and play-off round are divided into Champions Path (CH) and League Path (LP).

Qualified teams for 2020–21 UEFA Champions League
Entry round		Teams			
GS		(Germany) Bayern Munich (1st)^{TH}	(England) Manchester United (3rd)	(Germany) RB Leipzig (3rd)	(Portugal) Porto (1st)
GS		(Spain) Sevilla (4th)^{EL}	(England) Chelsea (4th)	(Germany) Borussia Mönchengladbach (4th)	(Belgium) Club Brugge (Abd-1st)
GS		(Spain) Real Madrid (1st)	(Italy) Juventus (1st)	(France) Paris Saint-Germain (Abd-1st)	(Ukraine) Shakhtar Donetsk (1st)
GS		(Spain) Barcelona (2nd)	(Italy) Inter Milan (2nd)	(France) Marseille (Abd-2nd)	(Turkey) İstanbul Başakşehir (1st)
GS		(Spain) Atlético Madrid (3rd)	(Italy) Atalanta (3rd)	(France) Rennes (Abd-3rd)	(Netherlands) Ajax (Abd-1st)
GS		(England) Liverpool (1st)	(Italy) Lazio (4th)	(Russia) Zenit Saint Petersburg (1st)	
GS		(England) Manchester City (2nd)	(Germany) Borussia Dortmund (2nd)	(Russia) Lokomotiv Moscow (2nd)	
PO	CH	(Austria) Red Bull Salzburg (1st)	(Czech Republic) Slavia Prague (1st)	(Greece) Olympiacos (1st)	
PO	LP	(Russia) Krasnodar (3rd)			
Q3	LP	(Portugal) Benfica (2nd)	(Belgium) Gent (Abd-2nd)	(Ukraine) Dynamo Kyiv (2nd)	
Q2	CH	(Croatia) Dinamo Zagreb (1st)	(Denmark) Midtjylland (1st)	(Switzerland) Young Boys (1st)	
Q2	LP	(Turkey) Beşiktaş (3rd)	(Austria) Rapid Wien (2nd)	(Greece) PAOK (2nd)	
Q2	LP	(Netherlands) AZ (Abd-2nd)	(Czech Republic) Viktoria Plzeň (2nd)	(Croatia) Lokomotiva Zagreb (2nd)	
Q1		(Cyprus) Omonia (Abd-1st)	(Israel) Maccabi Tel Aviv (1st)	(Republic of Ireland) Dundalk (1st)	(Estonia) Flora (1st)
Q1		(Serbia) Red Star Belgrade (1st)	(Bulgaria) Ludogorets Razgrad (1st)	(Finland) KuPS (1st)	(Georgia (country)) Dinamo Tbilisi (1st)
Q1		(Scotland) Celtic (Abd-1st)	(Romania) CFR Cluj (1st)	(Iceland) KR (1st)	(Wales) Connah's Quay Nomads (Abd-1st)
Q1		(Belarus) Dynamo Brest (1st)	(Slovakia) Slovan Bratislava (1st)	(Bosnia and Herzegovina) Sarajevo (Abd-1st)	(Montenegro) Budućnost Podgorica (Abd-1st)
Q1		(Sweden) Djurgårdens IF (1st)	(Slovenia) Celje (1st)	(Lithuania) Sūduva (1st)	(Faroe Islands) KÍ (1st)
Q1		(Norway) Molde (1st)	(Hungary) Ferencváros (1st)	(Latvia) Riga (1st)	(Gibraltar) Europa (Abd-1st)
Q1		(Kazakhstan) Astana (1st)	(North Macedonia) Sileks (Abd-2nd)	(Luxembourg) Fola Esch (Abd-1st)	
Q1		(Poland) Legia Warsaw (1st)	(Moldova) Sheriff Tiraspol (1st)	Ararat-Armenia (1st)	
Q1		(Azerbaijan) Qarabağ (Abd-1st)	(Albania) Tirana (1st)	(Malta) Floriana (Abd-1st)	
PR		(Northern Ireland) Linfield (Abd-1st)	(Kosovo) Drita (1st)	(Andorra) Inter Club d'Escaldes (1st)	(San Marino) Tre Fiori (Abd-1st)

Notes

1. Azerbaijan (AZE): The 2019–20 Azerbaijan Premier League was abandoned due to the COVID-19 pandemic in Azerbaijan. The top team of the league at the time of the abandonment, Qarabağ (who were declared champions), were selected to play in the 2020–21 UEFA Champions League by the Association of Football Federations of Azerbaijan, entering the first qualifying round.
2. Belgium (BEL): The 2019–20 Belgian First Division A was abandoned due to the COVID-19 pandemic in Belgium. The top two teams of the league at the time of the abandonment, Club Brugge (who were declared champions) and Gent, were selected to play in the 2020–21 UEFA Champions League by the Royal Belgian Football Association, entering the group stage and third qualifying round respectively.
3. Bosnia and Herzegovina (BIH): The 2019–20 Premier League of Bosnia and Herzegovina was abandoned due to the COVID-19 pandemic in Bosnia and Herzegovina. The top team of the league at the time of the abandonment, Sarajevo (who were declared champions), were selected to play in the 2020–21 UEFA Champions League by the Football Association of Bosnia and Herzegovina, entering the first qualifying round.
4. Cyprus (CYP): The 2019–20 Cypriot First Division was abandoned due to the COVID-19 pandemic in Cyprus. The top team of the league at the time of the abandonment, Omonia, were selected to play in the 2020–21 UEFA Champions League by the Cyprus Football Association, entering the first qualifying round.
5. England (ENG): Manchester City, the second-placed team of the 2019–20 Premier League, qualified for the 2020–21 UEFA Champions League group stage, but were banned from all UEFA club competitions for the 2020–21 and 2021–22 seasons by the UEFA Club Financial Control Body on 14 February 2020 due to alleged breaches of the UEFA Financial Fair Play Regulations. However, Manchester City appealed the decision to the Court of Arbitration for Sport, and on 13 July 2020, it was announced that the ban on them participating in UEFA club competitions was overturned and they can play in the 2020–21 UEFA Champions League.
6. France (FRA): The 2019–20 Ligue 1 was abandoned due to the COVID-19 pandemic in France. The top three teams of the league at the time of the abandonment based on the average number of points per matches played for each team, Paris Saint-Germain (who were declared champions), Marseille and Rennes, were selected to play in the 2020–21 UEFA Champions League by the French Football Federation, entering the group stage.
7. Gibraltar (GIB): The 2019–20 Gibraltar National League was abandoned due to the COVID-19 pandemic in Gibraltar. The top team of the league at the time of the abandonment, Europa, were selected to play in the 2020–21 UEFA Champions League by the Gibraltar Football Association, entering the first qualifying round.
8. Luxembourg (LUX): The 2019–20 Luxembourg National Division was abandoned due to the COVID-19 pandemic in Luxembourg. The top team of the league at the time of the abandonment, Fola Esch, were selected to play in the 2020–21 UEFA Champions League by the Luxembourg Football Federation, entering the first qualifying round.
9. Malta (MLT): The 2019–20 Maltese Premier League was abandoned due to the COVID-19 pandemic in Malta. The top team of the league at the time of the abandonment, Floriana (who were declared champions), were selected to play in the 2020–21 UEFA Champions League by the Malta Football Association, entering the first qualifying round.
10. Montenegro (MNE): The 2019–20 Montenegrin First League was abandoned due to the COVID-19 pandemic in Montenegro. The top team of the league at the time of the abandonment, Budućnost Podgorica (who were already assured of the title by then and were declared champions), were selected to play in the 2020–21 UEFA Champions League by the Football Association of Montenegro, entering the first qualifying round.
11. Netherlands (NED): The 2019–20 Eredivisie was abandoned due to the COVID-19 pandemic in the Netherlands. The top two teams of the league at the time of the abandonment, Ajax and AZ, were selected to play in the 2020–21 UEFA Champions League by the Royal Dutch Football Association, entering the group stage and second qualifying round respectively.
12. North Macedonia (MKD): The 2019–20 Macedonian First Football League was abandoned due to the COVID-19 pandemic in North Macedonia. The top team of the league at the time of the abandonment, Vardar (who were declared champions), failed to obtain a UEFA licence, and as a result, the second-placed team, Sileks, were selected to play in the 2020–21 UEFA Champions League by the Football Federation of North Macedonia, entering the first qualifying round.
13. Northern Ireland (NIR): The 2019–20 NIFL Premiership was abandoned due to the COVID-19 pandemic in Northern Ireland. The top team of the league at the time of the abandonement, Linfield (who were declared champions), were selected to play in the 2020–21 UEFA Champions League by the Irish Football Association, entering the preliminary round.
14. San Marino (SMR): The 2019–20 Campionato Sammarinese di Calcio was abandoned due to the COVID-19 pandemic in San Marino. The top team of the league at the time of the abandonment, Tre Fiori (who were declared champions), were selected to play in the 2020–21 UEFA Champions League by the San Marino Football Federation, entering the preliminary round.
15. Scotland (SCO): The 2019–20 Scottish Premiership was abandoned due to the COVID-19 pandemic in Scotland. The top team of the league at the time of the abandonment based on the average number of points per matches played for each team, Celtic (who were declared champions), were selected to play in the 2020–21 UEFA Champions League by the Scottish Football Association, entering the first qualifying round.
16. Turkey (TUR): Trabzonspor, the second-placed team of the 2019–20 Süper Lig, would have qualified for the 2020–21 UEFA Champions League second qualifying round, but were banned from all UEFA club competitions for the 2020–21 season by the UEFA Club Financial Control Body on 3 June 2020 due to breaches of the UEFA Financial Fair Play Regulations. Trabzonspor appealed the decision to the Court of Arbitration for Sport, but on 30 July 2020, it was announced that the ban on them participating in UEFA club competitions was upheld. As a result, Beşiktaş, the third-placed team, qualified for this berth.
17. Wales (WAL): The 2019–20 Cymru Premier was abandoned due to the COVID-19 pandemic in Wales. The top team of the league at the time of the abandonment based on the average number of points per matches played for each team, Connah's Quay Nomads (who were declared champions), were selected to play in the 2020–21 UEFA Champions League by the Football Association of Wales, entering the first qualifying round.

== Round and draw dates ==
The schedule of the competition was as follows (all draws were held at the UEFA headquarters in Nyon, Switzerland unless otherwise stated). The tournament would originally have started in June 2020, but had been delayed to August due to the COVID-19 pandemic in Europe. The new schedule was announced by the UEFA Executive Committee on 17 June 2020. All qualifying matches, excluding the play-off round, were played as single leg matches, hosted by one of the teams decided by draw (except the preliminary round which was played at neutral venue).

The group stage draw was originally to be held at the Stavros Niarchos Foundation Cultural Center in Athens, Greece, but UEFA announced on 9 September 2020 that it would be relocated to Nyon, but it was eventually held at nearby Geneva.

Schedule for 2020–21 UEFA Champions League
Phase	Round	Draw date	First leg	Second leg
Qualifying	Preliminary round	17 July 2020	8 August 2020 (semi-final round)	11 August 2020 (final round)
Qualifying	First qualifying round	9 August 2020	18–19 August 2020	
Qualifying	Second qualifying round	10 August 2020	25–26 August 2020	
Qualifying	Third qualifying round	31 August 2020	15–16 September 2020	
Play-off	Play-off round	1 September 2020	22–23 September 2020	29–30 September 2020
Group stage	Matchday 1	1 October 2020 (Geneva)	20–21 October 2020	
Group stage	Matchday 2	1 October 2020 (Geneva)	27–28 October 2020	
Group stage	Matchday 3	1 October 2020 (Geneva)	3–4 November 2020	
Group stage	Matchday 4	1 October 2020 (Geneva)	24–25 November 2020	
Group stage	Matchday 5	1 October 2020 (Geneva)	1–2 December 2020	
Group stage	Matchday 6	1 October 2020 (Geneva)	8–9 December 2020	
Knockout phase	Round of 16	14 December 2020	16–17 & 23–24 February 2021	9–10 & 16–17 March 2021
Knockout phase	Quarter-finals	19 March 2021	6–7 April 2021	13–14 April 2021
Knockout phase	Semi-finals	19 March 2021	27–28 April 2021	4–5 May 2021
Knockout phase	Final	19 March 2021	29 May 2021 at Estádio do Dragão, Porto	

The original schedule of the competition, as planned before the pandemic, was as follows (all draws were to be held at the UEFA headquarters in Nyon, Switzerland, unless stated otherwise).

Original schedule for 2020–21 UEFA Champions League
Phase	Round	Draw date	First leg	Second leg
Qualifying	Preliminary round	9 June 2020	23 June 2020 (semi-final round)	26 June 2020 (final round)
Qualifying	First qualifying round	16 June 2020	7–8 July 2020	14–15 July 2020
Qualifying	Second qualifying round	17 June 2020	21–22 July 2020	28–29 July 2020
Qualifying	Third qualifying round	20 July 2020	4–5 August 2020	11 August 2020
Play-off	Play-off round	3 August 2020	18–19 August 2020	25–26 August 2020
Group stage	Matchday 1	27 August 2020 (Monaco)	15–16 September 2020	
Group stage	Matchday 2	27 August 2020 (Monaco)	29–30 September 2020	
Group stage	Matchday 3	27 August 2020 (Monaco)	20–21 October 2020	
Group stage	Matchday 4	27 August 2020 (Monaco)	3–4 November 2020	
Group stage	Matchday 5	27 August 2020 (Monaco)	24–25 November 2020	
Group stage	Matchday 6	27 August 2020 (Monaco)	8–9 December 2020	
Knockout phase	Round of 16	14 December 2020	16–17 & 23–24 February 2021	9–10 & 16–17 March 2021
Knockout phase	Quarter-finals	19 March 2021	6–7 April 2021	13–14 April 2021
Knockout phase	Semi-finals	19 March 2021	27–28 April 2021	4–5 May 2021
Knockout phase	Final	19 March 2021	29 May 2021 at Atatürk Olympic Stadium, Istanbul	

=== Major revision to schedule ===
The major revision to schedule of the competition, as planned before relocation the final from Istanbul, was as follows (all draws were to be held at the UEFA headquarters in Nyon, Switzerland, unless stated otherwise).

Major revision to schedule for 2020–21 UEFA Champions League
Phase	Round	Draw date	First leg	Second leg
Qualifying	Preliminary round	9 June 2020	23 June 2020 (semi-final round)	26 June 2020 (final round)
Qualifying	First qualifying round	16 June 2020	7–8 July 2020	14–15 July 2020
Qualifying	Second qualifying round	17 June 2020	21–22 July 2020	28–29 July 2020
Qualifying	Third qualifying round	20 July 2020	4–5 August 2020	11 August 2020
Play-off	Play-off round	3 August 2020	18–19 August 2020	25–26 August 2020
Group stage	Matchday 1	27 August 2020 (Monaco)	15–16 September 2020	
Group stage	Matchday 2	27 August 2020 (Monaco)	29–30 September 2020	
Group stage	Matchday 3	27 August 2020 (Monaco)	20–21 October 2020	
Group stage	Matchday 4	27 August 2020 (Monaco)	3–4 November 2020	
Group stage	Matchday 5	27 August 2020 (Monaco)	24–25 November 2020	
Group stage	Matchday 6	27 August 2020 (Monaco)	8–9 December 2020	
Knockout phase	Round of 16	14 December 2020	16–17 & 23–24 February 2021	9–10 & 16–17 March 2021
Knockout phase	Quarter-finals	19 March 2021	6–7 April 2021	13–14 April 2021
Knockout phase	Semi-finals	19 March 2021	27–28 April 2021	4–5 May 2021
Knockout phase	Final	19 March 2021	29 May 2021 at Krestovsky Stadium, Saint Petersburg	

== Effects of the COVID-19 pandemic ==
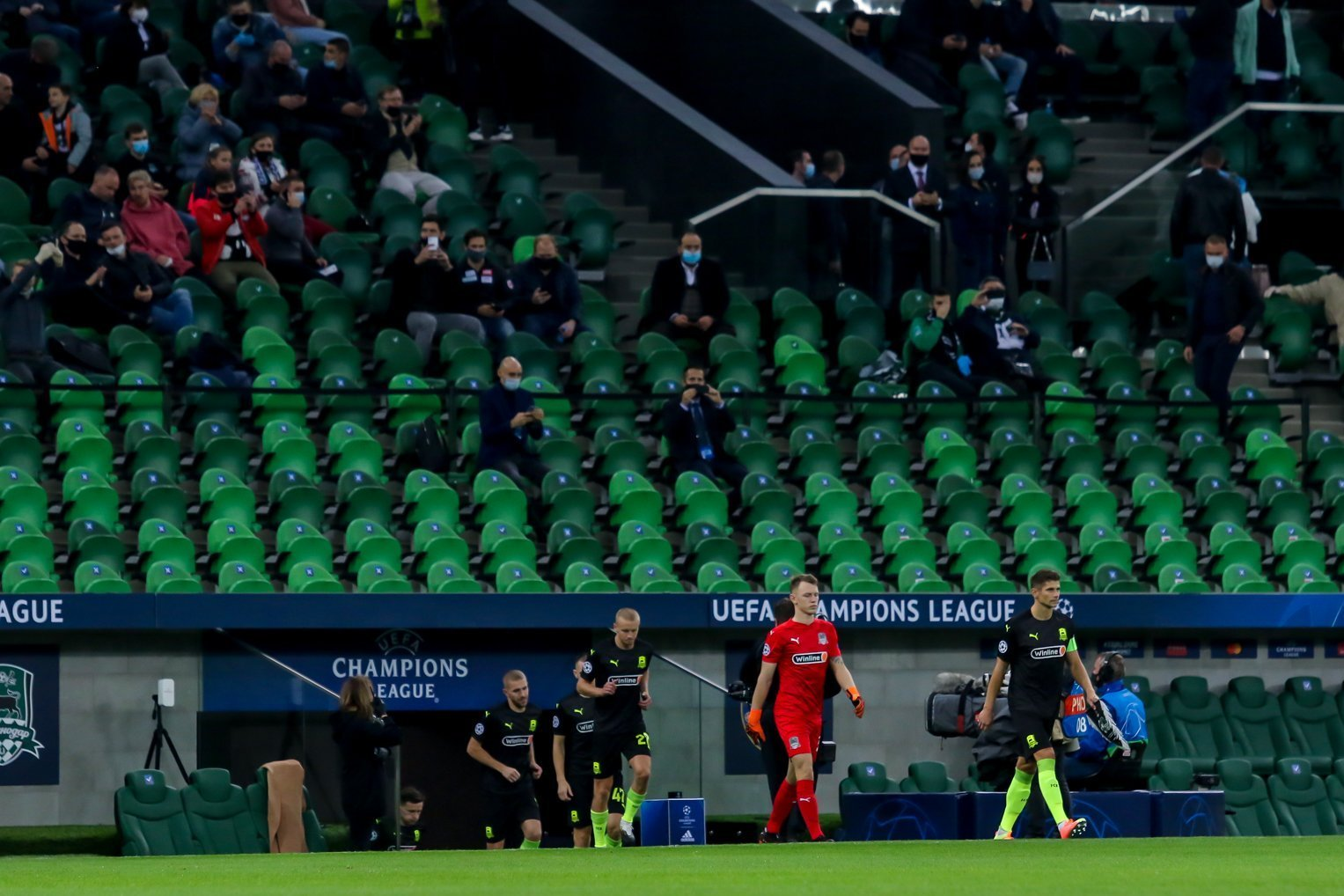
Krasnodar players on Matchday 2 group stage with limited capacity in the stands.

Due to the COVID-19 pandemic in Europe, the following special rules were applicable to the competition:

- If there were travel restrictions related to the COVID-19 pandemic that prevented the away team from entering the home team's country or returning to their own country, the match could be played at a neutral country or the away team's country that allowed the match to take place.
- If a team refused to play or was considered responsible for a match not taking place, they were considered to have forfeited the match. If both teams refused to play or were considered responsible for a match not taking place, both teams were disqualified.
- If a team had players and/or officials tested positive for SARS-2 coronavirus preventing them from playing the match before the deadline set by UEFA, they were considered to have forfeited the match.

On 24 September 2020, UEFA announced that five substitutions would be permitted from the group stage onward, with a sixth allowed in extra time. However, each team was only given three opportunities to make substitutions during matches, with a fourth opportunity in extra time, excluding substitutions made at half-time, before the start of extra time and at half-time in extra time. Consequently, a maximum of twelve players could be listed on the substitute bench.

All qualifying matches were played behind closed doors. Following the partial return of fans at the 2020 UEFA Super Cup, UEFA announced on 1 October 2020 that matches from the group stage onward could be played at 30% capacity if allowed by the local authorities.

The final was originally scheduled to be played at the Krestovsky Stadium in Saint Petersburg, Russia. However, due to the postponement and relocation of the 2020 final to Lisbon as a result of the COVID-19 pandemic in Europe, the final hosts were shifted back a year, with the Atatürk Olympic Stadium in Istanbul, Turkey instead planning to host the 2021 final. However, on 13 May 2021 UEFA announced that the final would be relocated to Porto in order to allow fans to attend the match.

== Qualifying rounds ==
=== Preliminary round ===
The draw for the preliminary round was held on 17 July 2020, 12:00 CEST. The semi-finals were played on 8 August at the Colovray Stadium in Nyon, Switzerland. The final was due to be played at the same venue on 11 August but the match was cancelled due to Drita players being put into quarantine after two players had tested positive for SARS-2 coronavirus, and Linfield were awarded a technical 3–0 win.

The losers of both semi-final and final rounds entered the 2020–21 UEFA Europa League second qualifying round.

Team 1	Score	Team 2
Semi-final round
Tre Fiori (San Marino)	0–2	(Northern Ireland) Linfield
Drita (Kosovo)	2–1	(Andorra) Inter Club d'Escaldes
Final round
Drita (Kosovo)	0–3 (Note: Linfield were awarded a 3–0 win after the match was cancelled due to Drita players testing positive for SARS-CoV-2.)	(Northern Ireland) Linfield

=== First qualifying round ===
The draw for the first qualifying round was held on 9 August 2020, 12:00 CEST. The matches were played on 18 and 19 August 2020. The match between KÍ and Slovan Bratislava was cancelled due to Slovan Bratislava players being put into quarantine after one player had tested positive for SARS-2 coronavirus, and KÍ were awarded a technical 3–0 win.

The losers entered the 2020–21 UEFA Europa League second qualifying round.

Home team	Score	Away team
Ferencváros (Hungary)	2–0	(Sweden) Djurgårdens IF
Celtic (Scotland)	6–0	(Iceland) KR
Legia Warsaw (Poland)	1–0	(Northern Ireland) Linfield
Sheriff Tiraspol (Moldova)	2–0	(Luxembourg) Fola Esch
Connah's Quay Nomads (Wales)	0–2	(Bosnia and Herzegovina) Sarajevo
Red Star Belgrade (Serbia)	5–0	(Gibraltar) Europa
Budućnost Podgorica (Montenegro)	1–3	(Bulgaria) Ludogorets Razgrad
Ararat-Armenia	0–1 (a.e.t.)	(Cyprus) Omonia
Floriana (Malta)	0–2	(Romania) CFR Cluj
Maccabi Tel Aviv (Israel)	2–0	(Latvia) Riga
Qarabağ (Azerbaijan)	4–0	(North Macedonia) Sileks
Dinamo Tbilisi (Georgia (country))	0–2	(Albania) Tirana
Dynamo Brest (Belarus)	6–3	(Kazakhstan) Astana
Molde (Norway)	5–0	(Finland) KuPS
Flora (Estonia)	1–1 (a.e.t.) (2–4 p)	(Lithuania) Sūduva
Celje (Slovenia)	3–0	(Republic of Ireland) Dundalk
KÍ (Faroe Islands)	3–0 (Note: KÍ were awarded a 3–0 win after the match was cancelled due to Slovan Bratislava players testing positive for SARS-CoV-2.)	(Slovakia) Slovan Bratislava

=== Second qualifying round ===
The draw for the second qualifying round was held on 10 August 2020, 12:00 CEST. The matches were played on 25 and 26 August 2020.

From the ten losers of Champions Path, two teams, Tirana and Ludogorets Razgrad, determined by a draw held on 31 August 2020 after the Europa League second qualifying round draw, entered the 2020–21 UEFA Europa League play-off round (Champions Path), while the other eight teams entered the 2020–21 UEFA Europa League third qualifying round (Champions Path). The losers of League Path entered the 2020–21 UEFA Europa League third qualifying round (Main Path).

Home team	Score	Away team
Champions Path
CFR Cluj (Romania)	2–2 (a.e.t.) (5–6 p)	(Croatia) Dinamo Zagreb
Young Boys (Switzerland)	3–1	(Faroe Islands) KÍ
Celtic (Scotland)	1–2	(Hungary) Ferencváros
Sūduva (Lithuania)	0–3	(Israel) Maccabi Tel Aviv
Legia Warsaw (Poland)	0–2 (a.e.t.)	(Cyprus) Omonia
Celje (Slovenia)	1–2	(Norway) Molde
Ludogorets Razgrad (Bulgaria)	0–1	(Denmark) Midtjylland
Dynamo Brest (Belarus)	2–1	(Bosnia and Herzegovina) Sarajevo
Qarabağ (Azerbaijan)	2–1	(Moldova) Sheriff Tiraspol
Tirana (Albania)	0–1	(Serbia) Red Star Belgrade
League Path
AZ (Netherlands)	3–1 (a.e.t.)	(Czech Republic) Viktoria Plzeň
PAOK (Greece)	3–1	(Turkey) Beşiktaş
Lokomotiva Zagreb (Croatia)	0–1	(Austria) Rapid Wien

=== Third qualifying round ===
The draw for the third qualifying round was held on 31 August 2020, 12:00 CEST. The matches were played on 15 and 16 September 2020.

The losers of Champions Path entered the 2020–21 UEFA Europa League play-off round (Champions Path). The losers of League Path entered the 2020–21 UEFA Europa League group stage.

Home team	Score	Away team
Champions Path
Ferencváros (Hungary)	2–1	(Croatia) Dinamo Zagreb
Qarabağ (Azerbaijan)	0–0 (a.e.t.) (5–6 p)	(Norway) Molde
Omonia (Cyprus)	1–1 (a.e.t.) (4–2 p)	(Serbia) Red Star Belgrade
Midtjylland (Denmark)	3–0	(Switzerland) Young Boys
Maccabi Tel Aviv (Israel)	1–0	(Belarus) Dynamo Brest
League Path
PAOK (Greece)	2–1	(Portugal) Benfica
Dynamo Kyiv (Ukraine)	2–0	(Netherlands) AZ
Gent (Belgium)	2–1	(Austria) Rapid Wien

== Play-off round ==
The draw for the play-off round was held on 1 September 2020, 12:00 CEST. The first legs were played on 22 and 23 September, and the second legs were played on 29 and 30 September 2020.

The losers of both Champions Path and League Path entered the 2020–21 UEFA Europa League group stage.

Team 1	Agg.	Team 2	1st leg	2nd leg
Champions Path
Slavia Prague (Czech Republic)	1–4	(Denmark) Midtjylland	0–0	1–4
Maccabi Tel Aviv (Israel)	2–5	(Austria) Red Bull Salzburg	1–2	1–3
Olympiacos (Greece)	2–0	(Cyprus) Omonia	2–0	0–0
Molde (Norway)	3–3 (a)	(Hungary) Ferencváros	3–3	0–0
League Path
Krasnodar (Russia)	4–2	(Greece) PAOK	2–1	2–1
Gent (Belgium)	1–5	(Ukraine) Dynamo Kyiv	1–2	0–3

== Group stage ==
Location of teams of the 2020–21 UEFA Champions League group stage.
Brown: Group A; Red: Group B; Orange: Group C; Yellow: Group D;
Green: Group E; Blue: Group F; Purple: Group G; Pink: Group H.

A total of 32 teams played in the group stage, from fifteen countries: 26 teams which entered in this stage, and the six winners of the play-off round (four from Champions Path, two from League Path).

The draw for the group stage was held on 1 October 2020, 17:00 CEST, at the RTS Studios in Geneva, Switzerland. The 32 teams were drawn into eight groups of four, with the restriction that teams from the same association could not be drawn against each other. For the draw, the teams were seeded into four pots based on the following principles (introduced starting 2015–16 season):

- Pot 1 contained the Champions League and Europa League title holders, and the champions of the top six associations based on their 2019 UEFA country coefficients. As the Champions League title holder, Bayern Munich, were also their national champions, the champions of the association ranked seventh, Porto, was also seeded in pot 1.
- Pot 2, 3 and 4 contained the remaining teams, seeded based on their 2020 UEFA club coefficients.

In each group, teams played against each other home-and-away in a round-robin format. The group winners and runners-up advanced to the round of 16, while the third-placed teams entered the 2020–21 UEFA Europa League round of 32. The matchdays were 20–21 October, 27–28 October, 3–4 November, 24–25 November, 1–2 December and 8–9 December 2020.

The youth teams of the clubs that qualified for the group stage were also set to participate in the 2020–21 UEFA Youth League, along with the youth domestic champions of the top 32 associations, in a single-leg knockout tournament. However, that tournament was later cancelled as a result of the COVID-19 pandemic.

İstanbul Başakşehir, Krasnodar, Midtjylland and Rennes made their debut appearances in the group stage. With İstanbul Başakşehir's appearance in the group stage, Istanbul became the first city to be represented in the group stage by four different teams (having been previously represented by Beşiktaş, Fenerbahçe and Galatasaray). This season became the first in the history of the Champions League in which three Russian clubs played in the group stage.

Tiebreakers
Teams were ranked according to points (3 points for a win, 1 point for a draw, 0 points for a loss), and if tied on points, the following tiebreaking criteria were applied, in the order given, to determine the rankings (Regulations Articles 17.01):
1. Points in head-to-head matches among tied teams;
2. Goal difference in head-to-head matches among tied teams;
3. Goals scored in head-to-head matches among tied teams;
4. Away goals scored in head-to-head matches among tied teams;
5. If more than two teams were tied, and after applying all head-to-head criteria above, a subset of teams were still tied, all head-to-head criteria above were reapplied exclusively to this subset of teams;
6. Goal difference in all group matches;
7. Goals scored in all group matches;
8. Away goals scored in all group matches;
9. Wins in all group matches;
10. Away wins in all group matches;
11. Disciplinary points (red card = 3 points, yellow card = 1 point, expulsion for two yellow cards in one match = 3 points);
12. UEFA club coefficient.

=== Group A ===
Pos	Team	Pld	W	D	L	GF	GA	GD	Pts	Qualification	BAY	ATM	SAL	LMO
1	(Germany) Bayern Munich	6	5	1	0	18	5	+13	16	Advance to knockout phase	—	4–0	3–1	2–0
2	(Spain) Atlético Madrid	6	2	3	1	7	8	−1	9	Advance to knockout phase	1–1	—	3–2	0–0
3	(Austria) Red Bull Salzburg	6	1	1	4	10	17	−7	4	Transfer to Europa League	2–6	0–2	—	2–2
4	(Russia) Lokomotiv Moscow	6	0	3	3	5	10	−5	3		1–2	1–1	1–3	—

Source: UEFA

=== Group B ===
Pos	Team	Pld	W	D	L	GF	GA	GD	Pts	Qualification	RMA	BMG	SHK	INT
1	(Spain) Real Madrid	6	3	1	2	11	9	+2	10	Advance to knockout phase	—	2–0	2–3	3–2
2	(Germany) Borussia Mönchengladbach	6	2	2	2	16	9	+7	8 (Note: Head-to-head points: Borussia Mönchengladbach 6, Shakhtar Donetsk 0.)	Advance to knockout phase	2–2	—	4–0	2–3
3	(Ukraine) Shakhtar Donetsk	6	2	2	2	5	12	−7	8	Transfer to Europa League	2–0	0–6	—	0–0
4	(Italy) Inter Milan	6	1	3	2	7	9	−2	6		0–2	2–2	0–0	—

Source: UEFA

=== Group C ===
Pos	Team	Pld	W	D	L	GF	GA	GD	Pts	Qualification	MCI	POR	OLY	MAR
1	(England) Manchester City	6	5	1	0	13	1	+12	16	Advance to knockout phase	—	3–1	3–0	3–0
2	(Portugal) Porto	6	4	1	1	10	3	+7	13	Advance to knockout phase	0–0	—	2–0	3–0
3	(Greece) Olympiacos	6	1	0	5	2	10	−8	3 (Note: Tied on head-to-head points (3). Head-to-head away goals: Olympiacos 1, Marseille 0.)	Transfer to Europa League	0–1	0–2	—	1–0
4	(France) Marseille	6	1	0	5	2	13	−11	3		0–3	0–2	2–1	—

Source: UEFA

=== Group D ===
Pos	Team	Pld	W	D	L	GF	GA	GD	Pts	Qualification	LIV	ATA	AJX	MID
1	(England) Liverpool	6	4	1	1	10	3	+7	13	Advance to knockout phase	—	0–2	1–0	2–0
2	(Italy) Atalanta	6	3	2	1	10	8	+2	11	Advance to knockout phase	0–5	—	2–2	1–1
3	(Netherlands) Ajax	6	2	1	3	7	7	0	7	Transfer to Europa League	0–1	0–1	—	3–1
4	(Denmark) Midtjylland	6	0	2	4	4	13	−9	2		1–1	0–4	1–2	—

Source: UEFA

=== Group E ===
Pos	Team	Pld	W	D	L	GF	GA	GD	Pts	Qualification	CHE	SEV	KRA	REN
1	(England) Chelsea	6	4	2	0	14	2	+12	14	Advance to knockout phase	—	0–0	1–1	3–0
2	(Spain) Sevilla	6	4	1	1	9	8	+1	13	Advance to knockout phase	0–4	—	3–2	1–0
3	(Russia) Krasnodar	6	1	2	3	6	11	−5	5	Transfer to Europa League	0–4	1–2	—	1–0
4	(France) Rennes	6	0	1	5	3	11	−8	1		1–2	1–3	1–1	—

Source: UEFA

=== Group F ===
Pos	Team	Pld	W	D	L	GF	GA	GD	Pts	Qualification	DOR	LAZ	BRU	ZEN
1	(Germany) Borussia Dortmund	6	4	1	1	12	5	+7	13	Advance to knockout phase	—	1–1	3–0	2–0
2	(Italy) Lazio	6	2	4	0	11	7	+4	10	Advance to knockout phase	3–1	—	2–2	3–1
3	(Belgium) Club Brugge	6	2	2	2	8	10	−2	8	Transfer to Europa League	0–3	1–1	—	3–0
4	(Russia) Zenit Saint Petersburg	6	0	1	5	4	13	−9	1		1–2	1–1	1–2	—

Source: UEFA

=== Group G ===
Pos	Team	Pld	W	D	L	GF	GA	GD	Pts	Qualification	JUV	BAR	DKV	FER
1	(Italy) Juventus	6	5	0	1	14	4	+10	15 (Note: Tied on head-to-head points (3). Head-to-head goal difference: Juventus +1, Barcelona –1.)	Advance to knockout phase	—	0–2	3–0	2–1
2	(Spain) Barcelona	6	5	0	1	16	5	+11	15	Advance to knockout phase	0–3	—	2–1	5–1
3	(Ukraine) Dynamo Kyiv	6	1	1	4	4	13	−9	4	Transfer to Europa League	0–2	0–4	—	1–0
4	(Hungary) Ferencváros	6	0	1	5	5	17	−12	1		1–4	0–3	2–2	—

Source: UEFA

=== Group H ===
Pos	Team	Pld	W	D	L	GF	GA	GD	Pts	Qualification	PAR	RBL	MUN	IBS
1	(France) Paris Saint-Germain	6	4	0	2	13	6	+7	12 (Note: Tied on head-to-head points (3). Head-to-head away goals: Paris Saint-Germain 1, RB Leipzig 0.)	Advance to knockout phase	—	1–0	1–2	5–1
2	(Germany) RB Leipzig	6	4	0	2	11	12	−1	12	Advance to knockout phase	2–1	—	3–2	2–0
3	(England) Manchester United	6	3	0	3	15	10	+5	9	Transfer to Europa League	1–3	5–0	—	4–1
4	(Turkey) İstanbul Başakşehir	6	1	0	5	7	18	−11	3		0–2	3–4	2–1	—

Source: UEFA

== Knockout phase ==
In the knockout phase, teams played against each other over two legs on a home-and-away basis, except for the one-match final. The mechanism of the draws for each round was as follows:

- In the draw for the round of 16, the eight group winners were seeded, and the eight group runners-up were unseeded. The seeded teams were drawn against the unseeded teams, with the seeded teams hosting the second leg. Teams from the same group or the same association could not be drawn against each other.
- In the draws for the quarter-finals onwards, there were no seedings, and teams from the same group or the same association could be drawn against each other. As the draws for the quarter-finals and semi-finals were held together before the quarter-finals were played, the identity of the quarter-final winners was not known at the time of the semi-final draw. A draw was also held to determine which semi-final winner was designated as the "home" team for the final (for administrative purposes as it was played at a neutral venue).

=== Bracket ===
Round of 16
(Italy) Lazio	1	1	2
(Germany) Bayern Munich	4	2	6
(Spain) Barcelona	1	1	2
(France) Paris Saint-Germain	4	1	5
(Germany) Borussia Mönchengladbach	0	0	0
(England) Manchester City	2	2	4
(Spain) Sevilla	2	2	4
(Germany) Borussia Dortmund	3	2	5
(Italy) Atalanta	0	1	1
(Spain) Real Madrid	1	3	4
(Germany) RB Leipzig	0	0	0
(England) Liverpool	2	2	4
(Portugal) Porto (a.e.t.; a)	2	2	4
(Italy) Juventus	1	3	4
(Spain) Atlético Madrid	0	0	0
(England) Chelsea	1	2	3

Quarter-finals
(Germany) Bayern Munich	2	1	3
(France) Paris Saint-Germain (a)	3	0	3
(England) Manchester City	2	2	4
(Germany) Borussia Dortmund	1	1	2
(Spain) Real Madrid	3	0	3
(England) Liverpool	1	0	1
(Portugal) Porto	0	1	1
(England) Chelsea	2	0	2

Semi-finals
(France) Paris Saint-Germain	1	0	1
(England) Manchester City	2	2	4
(Spain) Real Madrid	1	0	1
(England) Chelsea	1	2	3

Final
29 May – Porto
(England) Manchester City	0
(England) Chelsea	1

=== Round of 16 ===
The draw for the round of 16 was held on 14 December 2020, 12:00 CET. The first legs were played on 16, 17, 23 and 24 February, and the second legs were played on 9, 10, 16 and 17 March 2021.

Team 1	Agg.	Team 2	1st leg	2nd leg
Borussia Mönchengladbach (Germany)	0–4	(England) Manchester City	0–2	0–2
Lazio (Italy)	2–6	(Germany) Bayern Munich	1–4	1–2
Atlético Madrid (Spain)	0–3	(England) Chelsea	0–1	0–2
RB Leipzig (Germany)	0–4	(England) Liverpool	0–2	0–2
Porto (Portugal)	4–4 (a)	(Italy) Juventus	2–1	2–3 (a.e.t.)
Barcelona (Spain)	2–5	(France) Paris Saint-Germain	1–4	1–1
Sevilla (Spain)	4–5	(Germany) Borussia Dortmund	2–3	2–2
Atalanta (Italy)	1–4	(Spain) Real Madrid	0–1	1–3

=== Quarter-finals ===
The draw for the quarter-finals was held on 19 March 2021, 12:00 CET. The first legs were played on 6 and 7 April, and the second legs were played on 13 and 14 April 2021.

Team 1	Agg.	Team 2	1st leg	2nd leg
Manchester City (England)	4–2	(Germany) Borussia Dortmund	2–1	2–1
Porto (Portugal)	1–2	(England) Chelsea	0–2	1–0
Bayern Munich (Germany)	3–3 (a)	(France) Paris Saint-Germain	2–3	1–0
Real Madrid (Spain)	3–1	(England) Liverpool	3–1	0–0

=== Semi-finals ===
The draw for the semi-finals was held on 19 March 2021, 12:00 CET, after the quarter-final draw. The first legs were played on 27 and 28 April, and the second legs were played on 4 and 5 May 2021.

Team 1	Agg.	Team 2	1st leg	2nd leg
Paris Saint-Germain (France)	1–4	(England) Manchester City	1–2	0–2
Real Madrid (Spain)	1–3	(England) Chelsea	1–1	0–2

=== Final ===
The final was played on 29 May 2021 at the Estádio do Dragão in Porto. A draw was held on 19 March 2021, after the quarter-final and semi-final draws, to determine the "home" team for administrative purposes.

29 May 2021
20:00 UTC+1

Manchester City (England)	0–1	(England) Chelsea
	Report	Havertz 42'

Estádio do Dragão, Porto
Attendance: 14,110
Referee: Antonio Mateu Lahoz (Spain)

== Statistics ==
Statistics exclude qualifying rounds and play-off round.

=== Top goalscorers ===
Rank	Player	Team	Goals	Minutes played
1	(Norway) Erling Haaland	(Germany) Borussia Dortmund	10	705
2	(France) Kylian Mbappé	(France) Paris Saint-Germain	8	900
3	(France) Olivier Giroud	(England) Chelsea	6	257
3	(Morocco) Youssef En-Nesyri	(Spain) Sevilla	6	386
3	(England) Marcus Rashford	(England) Manchester United	6	416
3	(Spain) Álvaro Morata	(Italy) Juventus	6	597
3	(Brazil) Neymar	(France) Paris Saint-Germain	6	746
3	(Egypt) Mohamed Salah	(England) Liverpool	6	781
3	(France) Karim Benzema	(Spain) Real Madrid	6	842
10	(Italy) Ciro Immobile	(Italy) Lazio	5	417
10	(Poland) Robert Lewandowski	(Germany) Bayern Munich	5	514
10	(Argentina) Lionel Messi	(Spain) Barcelona	5	540
10	(France) Alassane Pléa	(Germany) Borussia Mönchengladbach	5	540
10	(Portugal) Sérgio Oliveira	(Portugal) Porto	5	740

=== Top assists ===
Rank	Player	Team	Assists	Minutes played
1	(Colombia) Juan Cuadrado	(Italy) Juventus	6	551
2	(Germany) Joshua Kimmich	(Germany) Bayern Munich	4	617
2	(Belgium) Kevin De Bruyne	(England) Manchester City	4	669
2	(Argentina) Ángel Di María	(France) Paris Saint-Germain	4	697
5	(England) Jadon Sancho	(Germany) Borussia Dortmund	3	386
5	(France) Alassane Pléa	(Germany) Borussia Mönchengladbach	3	540
5	(Serbia) Dušan Tadić	(Netherlands) Ajax	3	540
5	(France) Kingsley Coman	(Germany) Bayern Munich	3	549
5	(Spain) Angeliño	(Germany) RB Leipzig	3	627
5	(Germany) Thomas Müller	(Germany) Bayern Munich	3	632
5	(Brazil) Neymar	(France) Paris Saint-Germain	3	746
5	(Germany) Kai Havertz	(England) Chelsea	3	788
5	(France) Kylian Mbappé	(France) Paris Saint-Germain	3	900
5	(Croatia) Luka Modrić	(Spain) Real Madrid	3	911
5	(England) Phil Foden	(England) Manchester City	3	1066

=== Squad of the season ===
The UEFA technical study group selected the following 23 players as the squad of the tournament.

Pos.	Player	Team
GK	(Belgium) Thibaut Courtois	(Spain) Real Madrid
GK	(Brazil) Ederson	(England) Manchester City
GK	(Senegal) Édouard Mendy	(England) Chelsea
DF	(Spain) César Azpilicueta	(England) Chelsea
DF	(Portugal) Rúben Dias	(England) Manchester City
DF	(Brazil) Marquinhos	(France) Paris Saint-Germain
DF	(Germany) Antonio Rüdiger	(England) Chelsea
DF	(England) Ben Chilwell	(England) Chelsea
DF	(Austria) David Alaba	(Germany) Bayern Munich
MF	(Italy) Jorginho	(England) Chelsea
MF	(England) Mason Mount	(England) Chelsea
MF	(France) N'Golo Kanté	(England) Chelsea
MF	(Belgium) Kevin De Bruyne	(England) Manchester City
MF	(Germany) İlkay Gündoğan	(England) Manchester City
MF	(Croatia) Luka Modrić	(Spain) Real Madrid
MF	(Portugal) Sérgio Oliveira	(Portugal) Porto
MF	(England) Phil Foden	(England) Manchester City
FW	(Norway) Erling Haaland	(Germany) Borussia Dortmund
FW	(France) Kylian Mbappé	(France) Paris Saint-Germain
FW	(Poland) Robert Lewandowski	(Germany) Bayern Munich
FW	(France) Karim Benzema	(Spain) Real Madrid
FW	(Brazil) Neymar	(France) Paris Saint-Germain
FW	(Argentina) Lionel Messi	(Spain) Barcelona

=== Players of the season ===
Votes were cast for players of the season by coaches of the 32 teams in the group stage, together with 55 journalists selected by the European Sports Media (ESM) group, representing each of UEFA's member associations. The coaches were not allowed to vote for players from their own teams. Jury members selected their top three players, with the first receiving five points, the second three and the third one. In case of a tie on points, the number of five-point votes received served as the tiebreaker. The shortlist of the top three players was announced on 13 August 2021. The award winners were announced and presented during the 2021–22 UEFA Champions League group stage draw in Turkey on 26 August 2021.

==== Goalkeeper of the season ====
Rank	Player	Team(s)	Points
Shortlist of top three
1	(Senegal) Édouard Mendy	(England) Chelsea	286
2	(Brazil) Ederson	(England) Manchester City	154
3	(Belgium) Thibaut Courtois	(Spain) Real Madrid	96
Players ranked 4–10
4	(Costa Rica) Keylor Navas	(France) Paris Saint-Germain	50
5	(Germany) Manuel Neuer	(Germany) Bayern Munich	36
6	(Slovenia) Jan Oblak	(Spain) Atlético Madrid	35
7	(Italy) Gianluigi Donnarumma	(Italy) Milan	20
8	(Germany) Marc-André ter Stegen	(Spain) Barcelona	13
9	(Brazil) Alisson	(England) Liverpool	4
9	(Argentina) Agustín Marchesín	(Portugal) Porto	4

==== Defender of the season ====
Rank	Player	Team(s)	Points
Shortlist of top three
1	(Portugal) Rúben Dias	(England) Manchester City	217
2	(Spain) César Azpilicueta	(England) Chelsea	115
3	(Germany) Antonio Rüdiger	(England) Chelsea	78
Players ranked 4–10
4	(Brazil) Marquinhos	(France) Paris Saint-Germain	78
5	(Brazil) Thiago Silva	(England) Chelsea	59
6	(England) Kyle Walker	(England) Manchester City	35
7	(Italy) Giorgio Chiellini	(Italy) Juventus	18
8	(England) John Stones	(England) Manchester City	15
9	(Austria) David Alaba	(Germany) Bayern Munich	14
9	(Italy) Leonardo Bonucci	(Italy) Juventus	14

==== Midfielder of the season ====
Rank	Player	Team(s)	Points
Shortlist of top three
1	(France) N'Golo Kanté	(England) Chelsea	263
2	(Belgium) Kevin De Bruyne	(England) Manchester City	197
3	(Italy) Jorginho	(England) Chelsea	149
Players ranked 4–10
4	(Germany) İlkay Gündoğan	(England) Manchester City	15
4	(England) Mason Mount	(England) Chelsea	15
6	(Netherlands) Frenkie de Jong	(Spain) Barcelona	9
6	(Croatia) Luka Modrić	(Spain) Real Madrid	9
8	(Spain) Pedri	(Spain) Barcelona	6
9	(Germany) Kai Havertz	(England) Chelsea	5
9	(Netherlands) Georginio Wijnaldum	(England) Liverpool	5

==== Forward of the season ====
Rank	Player	Team(s)	Points
Shortlist of top three
1	(Norway) Erling Haaland	(Germany) Borussia Dortmund	202
2	(France) Kylian Mbappé	(France) Paris Saint-Germain	154
3	(Poland) Robert Lewandowski	(Germany) Bayern Munich	104
Players ranked 4–10
4	(Argentina) Lionel Messi	(Spain) Barcelona	76
5	(France) Karim Benzema	(Spain) Real Madrid	70
6	(Brazil) Neymar	(France) Paris Saint-Germain	23
7	(Germany) Kai Havertz	(England) Chelsea	16
7	(England) Raheem Sterling	(England) Manchester City	16
9	(Belgium) Romelu Lukaku	(Italy) Inter Milan	6
9	(England) Mason Mount	(England) Chelsea	6

== See also ==
- 2020–21 UEFA Europa League
- 2021 UEFA Super Cup
- 2020–21 UEFA Women's Champions League
- 2020–21 UEFA Youth League
- 2020–21 UEFA Futsal Champions League
