= 2020–21 UEFA Champions League knockout phase =

Sports competition

The 2020–21 UEFA Champions League knockout phase began on 16 February with the round of 16 and ended on 29 May 2021 with the final at the Estádio do Dragão in Porto, Portugal, to decide the champions of the 2020–21 UEFA Champions League. A total of 16 teams competed in the knockout phase.

Times are CET/CEST, (Note: CET (UTC+1) for dates up to 27 March 2021 (round of 16), and CEST (UTC+2) for dates thereafter (quarter-finals, semi-finals and final).) as listed by UEFA (local times, if different, are in parentheses).

== Qualified teams ==
The knockout phase involves the sixteen teams which qualified as winners and runners-up of each of the eight groups in the group stage.

Group	Winners (seeded in round of 16 draw)	Runners-up (unseeded in round of 16 draw)
A	(Germany) Bayern Munich	(Spain) Atlético Madrid
B	(Spain) Real Madrid	(Germany) Borussia Mönchengladbach
C	(England) Manchester City	(Portugal) Porto
D	(England) Liverpool	(Italy) Atalanta
E	(England) Chelsea	(Spain) Sevilla
F	(Germany) Borussia Dortmund	(Italy) Lazio
G	(Italy) Juventus	(Spain) Barcelona
H	(France) Paris Saint-Germain	(Germany) RB Leipzig

== Format ==
Each tie in the knockout phase, apart from the final, was played over two legs, with each team playing one leg at home. The team that scored more goals on aggregate over the two legs advanced to the next round. If the aggregate score was level, the away goals rule was applied, i.e. the team that scored more goals away from home over the two legs advanced. If away goals were also equal, then extra time was played. The away goals rule was again applied after extra time, i.e. if there were goals scored during extra time and the aggregate score is still level, the visiting team advanced by more away goals scored. If no goals were scored during extra time, the winners were decided by a penalty shoot-out. In the final, which was played as a single match, if the score was level at the end of normal time, extra time would be played, followed by a penalty shoot-out if the score was still level. The mechanism of the draws for each round was as follows:

- In the draw for the round of 16, the eight group winners were seeded, and the eight group runners-up were unseeded. The seeded teams were drawn against the unseeded teams, with the seeded teams hosting the second leg. Teams from the same group or the same association could not be drawn against each other.
- In the draws for the quarter-finals onwards, there were no seedings, and teams from the same group or the same association could be drawn against each other. As the draws for the quarter-finals and semi-finals were held together before the quarter-finals were played, the identity of the quarter-final winners was not known at the time of the semi-final draw. A draw was also held to determine which semi-final winner was designated as the "home" team for the final (for administrative purposes as it was played at a neutral venue).

For the quarter-finals and semi-finals, teams from the same city were not scheduled to play at home on the same day or consecutive days, due to logistics and crowd control. To avoid such scheduling conflict, if the two teams were drawn to play at home for the same leg, the order of legs of the tie involving the team which was not titleholders of Champions League or Europa League (or lower-tier, if both were continental titleholders), or the team with the lower domestic ranking in the qualifying season (if neither team were continental title holder) was reversed from the original draw.

== Schedule ==
The schedule was as follows (all draws were held at the UEFA headquarters in Nyon, Switzerland).

Round	Draw date	First leg	Second leg
Round of 16	14 December 2020, 12:00	16–17 & 23–24 February 2021	9–10 & 16–17 March 2021
Quarter-finals	19 March 2021, 12:00	6–7 April 2021	13–14 April 2021
Semi-finals	19 March 2021, 12:00	27–28 April 2021	4–5 May 2021
Final	19 March 2021, 12:00	29 May 2021 at Estádio do Dragão, Porto	

== Bracket ==
Round of 16
(Italy) Lazio	1	1	2
(Germany) Bayern Munich	4	2	6
(Spain) Barcelona	1	1	2
(France) Paris Saint-Germain	4	1	5
(Germany) Borussia Mönchengladbach	0	0	0
(England) Manchester City	2	2	4
(Spain) Sevilla	2	2	4
(Germany) Borussia Dortmund	3	2	5
(Italy) Atalanta	0	1	1
(Spain) Real Madrid	1	3	4
(Germany) RB Leipzig	0	0	0
(England) Liverpool	2	2	4
(Portugal) Porto (a.e.t.; a)	2	2	4
(Italy) Juventus	1	3	4
(Spain) Atlético Madrid	0	0	0
(England) Chelsea	1	2	3

Quarter-finals
(Germany) Bayern Munich	2	1	3
(France) Paris Saint-Germain (a)	3	0	3
(England) Manchester City	2	2	4
(Germany) Borussia Dortmund	1	1	2
(Spain) Real Madrid	3	0	3
(England) Liverpool	1	0	1
(Portugal) Porto	0	1	1
(England) Chelsea	2	0	2

Semi-finals
(France) Paris Saint-Germain	1	0	1
(England) Manchester City	2	2	4
(Spain) Real Madrid	1	0	1
(England) Chelsea	1	2	3

Final
29 May – Porto
(England) Manchester City	0
(England) Chelsea	1

== Round of 16 ==
The draw for the round of 16 was held on 14 December 2020, 12:00 CET.

=== Summary ===
The first legs were played on 16, 17, 23 and 24 February, and the second legs were played on 9, 10, 16 and 17 March 2021.

Team 1	Agg.	Team 2	1st leg	2nd leg
Borussia Mönchengladbach (Germany)	0–4	(England) Manchester City	0–2	0–2
Lazio (Italy)	2–6	(Germany) Bayern Munich	1–4	1–2
Atlético Madrid (Spain)	0–3	(England) Chelsea	0–1	0–2
RB Leipzig (Germany)	0–4	(England) Liverpool	0–2	0–2
Porto (Portugal)	4–4 (a)	(Italy) Juventus	2–1	2–3 (a.e.t.)
Barcelona (Spain)	2–5	(France) Paris Saint-Germain	1–4	1–1
Sevilla (Spain)	4–5	(Germany) Borussia Dortmund	2–3	2–2
Atalanta (Italy)	1–4	(Spain) Real Madrid	0–1	1–3

=== Matches ===
24 February 2021
21:00

Borussia Mönchengladbach (Germany)	0–2	(England) Manchester City
	Report	Silva 29'; Gabriel Jesus 65'

Puskás Aréna, Budapest, Hungary (Note: The Borussia Mönchengladbach v Manchester City and the RB Leipzig v Liverpool ties, originally to be played at Borussia-Park, Mönchengladbach, at City of Manchester Stadium, Manchester, at Red Bull Arena, Leipzig, and at Anfield, Liverpool, were moved to Puskás Aréna, Budapest, Hungary, due to travel restrictions related to the COVID-19 pandemic between Germany and the United Kingdom.)
Attendance: 0 (Note: Due to the COVID-19 pandemic in Europe, the match was played behind closed doors.)
Referee: Artur Soares Dias (Portugal)
16 March 2021
21:00

Manchester City (England)	2–0	(Germany) Borussia Mönchengladbach
De Bruyne 12'; Gündoğan 18'	Report

Puskás Aréna, Budapest, Hungary
Attendance: 0
Referee: Sergei Karasev (Russia)

Manchester City won 4–0 on aggregate.

23 February 2021
21:00

Lazio (Italy)	1–4	(Germany) Bayern Munich
Correa 49'	Report	Lewandowski 9'; Musiala 24'; Sané 42'; Acerbi 47' (o.g.)

Stadio Olimpico, Rome
Attendance: 0
Referee: Orel Grinfeld (Israel)
17 March 2021
21:00

Bayern Munich (Germany)	2–1	(Italy) Lazio
Lewandowski 33' (pen.); Choupo-Moting 73'	Report	Parolo 82'

Allianz Arena, Munich
Attendance: 0
Referee: István Kovács (Romania)

Bayern Munich won 6–2 on aggregate.

23 February 2021
21:00

Atlético Madrid (Spain)	0–1	(England) Chelsea
	Report	Giroud 68'

Arena Națională, Bucharest, Romania (Note: The Atlético Madrid v Chelsea match, originally to be played at Metropolitano Stadium, Madrid, was moved to Arena Națională, Bucharest, Romania, due to travel restrictions related to the COVID-19 pandemic from the United Kingdom to Spain.)
Attendance: 0
Referee: Felix Brych (Germany)
17 March 2021
21:00 (20:00 UTC+0)

Chelsea (England)	2–0	(Spain) Atlético Madrid
Ziyech 34'; Emerson 90+4'	Report

Stamford Bridge, London
Attendance: 0
Referee: Daniele Orsato (Italy)

Chelsea won 3–0 on aggregate.

16 February 2021
21:00

RB Leipzig (Germany)	0–2	(England) Liverpool
	Report	Salah 53'; Mané 58'

Puskás Aréna, Budapest, Hungary
Attendance: 0
Referee: Slavko Vinčić (Slovenia)
10 March 2021
21:00

Liverpool (England)	2–0	(Germany) RB Leipzig
Salah 70'; Mané 74'	Report

Puskás Aréna, Budapest, Hungary
Attendance: 0
Referee: Clément Turpin (France)

Liverpool won 4–0 on aggregate.

17 February 2021
21:00 (20:00 UTC+0)

Porto (Portugal)	2–1	(Italy) Juventus
Taremi 2'; Marega 46'	Report	Chiesa 82'

Estádio do Dragão, Porto
Attendance: 0
Referee: Carlos del Cerro Grande (Spain)
9 March 2021
21:00

Juventus (Italy)	3–2 (a.e.t.)	(Portugal) Porto
Chiesa 49', 63'; Rabiot 117'	Report	Oliveira 19' (pen.), 115'

Juventus Stadium, Turin
Attendance: 0
Referee: Björn Kuipers (Netherlands)

4–4 on aggregate; Porto won on away goals.

16 February 2021
21:00

Barcelona (Spain)	1–4	(France) Paris Saint-Germain
Messi 27' (pen.)	Report	Mbappé 32', 65', 85'; Kean 70'

Camp Nou, Barcelona
Attendance: 0
Referee: Björn Kuipers (Netherlands)
10 March 2021
21:00

Paris Saint-Germain (France)	1–1	(Spain) Barcelona
Mbappé 31' (pen.)	Report	Messi 37'

Parc des Princes, Paris
Attendance: 0
Referee: Anthony Taylor (England)

Paris Saint-Germain won 5–2 on aggregate.

17 February 2021
21:00

Sevilla (Spain)	2–3	(Germany) Borussia Dortmund
Suso 7'; De Jong 84'	Report	Dahoud 19'; Haaland 27', 43'

Ramón Sánchez Pizjuán, Seville
Attendance: 0
Referee: Danny Makkelie (Netherlands)
9 March 2021
21:00

Borussia Dortmund (Germany)	2–2	(Spain) Sevilla
Haaland 35', 54' (pen.)	Report	En-Nesyri 69' (pen.), 90+6'

Westfalenstadion, Dortmund
Attendance: 0
Referee: Cüneyt Çakır (Turkey)

Borussia Dortmund won 5–4 on aggregate.

24 February 2021
21:00

Atalanta (Italy)	0–1	(Spain) Real Madrid
	Report	Mendy 86'

Stadio Atleti Azzurri d'Italia, Bergamo
Attendance: 0
Referee: Tobias Stieler (Germany)
16 March 2021
21:00

Real Madrid (Spain)	3–1	(Italy) Atalanta
Benzema 34'; Ramos 60' (pen.); Asensio 85'	Report	Muriel 83'

Alfredo Di Stéfano, Madrid (Note: Real Madrid played their home matches at Alfredo Di Stéfano, Madrid, instead of their regular stadium Santiago Bernabéu, Madrid.)
Attendance: 0
Referee: Danny Makkelie (Netherlands)

Real Madrid won 4–1 on aggregate.

== Quarter-finals ==
The draw for the quarter-finals was held on 19 March 2021, 12:00 CET.

=== Summary ===
The first legs were played on 6 and 7 April, and the second legs were played on 13 and 14 April 2021.

Team 1	Agg.	Team 2	1st leg	2nd leg
Manchester City (England)	4–2	(Germany) Borussia Dortmund	2–1	2–1
Porto (Portugal)	1–2	(England) Chelsea	0–2	1–0
Bayern Munich (Germany)	3–3 (a)	(France) Paris Saint-Germain	2–3	1–0
Real Madrid (Spain)	3–1	(England) Liverpool	3–1	0–0

=== Matches ===
6 April 2021
21:00 (20:00 UTC+1)

Manchester City (England)	2–1	(Germany) Borussia Dortmund
De Bruyne 19'; Foden 90'	Report	Reus 84'

City of Manchester Stadium, Manchester
Attendance: 0
Referee: Ovidiu Hațegan (Romania)
14 April 2021
21:00

Borussia Dortmund (Germany)	1–2	(England) Manchester City
Bellingham 15'	Report	Mahrez 55' (pen.); Foden 75'

Westfalenstadion, Dortmund
Attendance: 0
Referee: Carlos del Cerro Grande (Spain)

Manchester City won 4–2 on aggregate.

7 April 2021
21:00

Porto (Portugal)	0–2	(England) Chelsea
	Report	Mount 32'; Chilwell 85'

Ramón Sánchez Pizjuán, Seville, Spain (Note: The Porto v Chelsea tie was played at Ramón Sánchez Pizjuán, Seville, Spain, due to travel restrictions related to the COVID-19 pandemic between Portugal and the United Kingdom.)
Attendance: 0
Referee: Slavko Vinčić (Slovenia)
13 April 2021
21:00

Chelsea (England)	0–1	(Portugal) Porto
	Report	Taremi 90+4'

Ramón Sánchez Pizjuán, Seville, Spain
Attendance: 0
Referee: Clément Turpin (France)

Chelsea won 2–1 on aggregate.

7 April 2021
21:00

Bayern Munich (Germany)	2–3	(France) Paris Saint-Germain
Choupo-Moting 37'; Müller 60'	Report	Mbappé 3', 68'; Marquinhos 28'

Allianz Arena, Munich
Attendance: 0
Referee: Antonio Mateu Lahoz (Spain)
13 April 2021
21:00

Paris Saint-Germain (France)	0–1	(Germany) Bayern Munich
	Report	Choupo-Moting 40'

Parc des Princes, Paris
Attendance: 0
Referee: Daniele Orsato (Italy)

3–3 on aggregate; Paris Saint-Germain won on away goals.

6 April 2021
21:00

Real Madrid (Spain)	3–1	(England) Liverpool
Vinícius 27', 65'; Asensio 36'	Report	Salah 51'

Alfredo Di Stéfano, Madrid
Attendance: 0
Referee: Felix Brych (Germany)
14 April 2021
21:00 (20:00 UTC+1)

Liverpool (England)	0–0	(Spain) Real Madrid
	Report

Anfield, Liverpool
Attendance: 0
Referee: Björn Kuipers (Netherlands)

Real Madrid won 3–1 on aggregate.

== Semi-finals ==
The draw for the semi-finals was held on 19 March 2021, 12:00 CET, after the quarter-final draw.

=== Summary ===
The first legs were played on 27 and 28 April, and the second legs were played on 4 and 5 May 2021.

Team 1	Agg.	Team 2	1st leg	2nd leg
Paris Saint-Germain (France)	1–4	(England) Manchester City	1–2	0–2
Real Madrid (Spain)	1–3	(England) Chelsea	1–1	0–2

=== Matches ===
28 April 2021
21:00

Paris Saint-Germain (France)	1–2	(England) Manchester City
Marquinhos 15'	Report	De Bruyne 64'; Mahrez 71'

Parc des Princes, Paris
Attendance: 0
Referee: Felix Brych (Germany)
4 May 2021
21:00 (20:00 UTC+1)

Manchester City (England)	2–0	(France) Paris Saint-Germain
Mahrez 11', 63'	Report

City of Manchester Stadium, Manchester
Attendance: 0
Referee: Björn Kuipers (Netherlands)

Manchester City won 4–1 on aggregate.

27 April 2021
21:00

Real Madrid (Spain)	1–1	(England) Chelsea
Benzema 29'	Report	Pulisic 14'

Alfredo Di Stéfano, Madrid
Attendance: 0
Referee: Danny Makkelie (Netherlands)
5 May 2021
21:00 (20:00 UTC+1)

Chelsea (England)	2–0	(Spain) Real Madrid
Werner 28'; Mount 85'	Report

Stamford Bridge, London
Attendance: 0
Referee: Daniele Orsato (Italy)

Chelsea won 3–1 on aggregate.

== Final ==
The final was played on 29 May 2021 at the Estádio do Dragão in Porto. A draw was held on 19 March 2021, after the quarter-final and semi-final draws, to determine the "home" team for administrative purposes.

29 May 2021
21:00 (20:00 UTC+1)

Manchester City (England)	0–1	(England) Chelsea
	Report	Havertz 42'

Estádio do Dragão, Porto
Attendance: 14,110
Referee: Antonio Mateu Lahoz (Spain)
