= 2020–21 UEFA Champions League group stage =

International football competition

The 2020–21 UEFA Champions League group stage began on 20 October 2020 and ended on 9 December 2020. A total of 32 teams competed in the group stage to decide the 16 places in the knockout phase of the 2020–21 UEFA Champions League.

Krasnodar, Midtjylland, İstanbul Başakşehir and Rennes made their debut appearances in the group stage. Istanbul became the first city to provide four different participating teams in the group stage. This group stage was also the first in Champions League history to include three Russian teams.

== Draw ==
The draw was held at the RTS Studios in Geneva, Switzerland on 1 October 2020 at 17:00 CEST.

The 32 teams were drawn into eight groups of four, with the restriction that teams from the same association could not be drawn against each other. For the draw, the teams were seeded into four pots based on the following principles (Regulations Article 13.06):

- Pot 1 contained the Champions League and Europa League title holders, and the champions of the top six associations based on their 2019 UEFA country coefficients. As the Champions League title holders, Bayern Munich, were also the champions of their association, the champions of the next highest ranked association, Portugal, were also seeded into Pot 1.
- Pots 2, 3 and 4 contained the remaining teams, seeded based on their 2020 UEFA club coefficients.

On 17 July 2014, the UEFA emergency panel ruled that Ukrainian and Russian clubs would not be drawn against each other "until further notice" due to the political unrest between the countries.

Moreover, for associations with two or more teams, teams were paired in order to split them into two sets of four groups (A–D, E–H) for maximum television coverage. The following pairings were announced by UEFA after the group stage teams were confirmed:

1. (Germany) Bayern Munich and Borussia Dortmund
2. (Spain) Sevilla and Atlético Madrid
3. (Spain) Real Madrid and Barcelona
4. (England) Liverpool and Manchester United
5. (Italy) Juventus and Inter Milan
6. (France) Paris Saint-Germain and Marseille
7. (Russia) Zenit Saint Petersburg and Lokomotiv Moscow
8. (England) Manchester City and Chelsea
9. (Ukraine) Shakhtar Donetsk and Dynamo Kyiv
10. (Germany) RB Leipzig and Borussia Mönchengladbach
11. (Italy) Lazio and Atalanta

On each matchday, one set of four groups played their matches on Tuesday, while the other set of four groups played their matches on Wednesday, with the two sets of groups alternating between each matchday. The fixtures were decided after the draw, using a computer draw not shown to public, with the following match sequence (Regulations Article 16.02):

Group stage schedule
| Matchday | Dates |
|---|---|
| Matchday 1 | 20–21 October 2020 |
| Matchday 2 | 27–28 October 2020 |
| Matchday 3 | 3–4 November 2020 |
| Matchday 4 | 24–25 November 2020 |
| Matchday 5 | 1–2 December 2020 |
| Matchday 6 | 8–9 December 2020 |

There were scheduling restrictions: for example, teams from the same city (e.g. Real Madrid & Atlético Madrid and Manchester City & Manchester United) in general were not scheduled to play at home on the same matchday (to avoid them playing at home on the same day or on consecutive days, due to logistics and crowd control), and teams from "winter countries" (e.g. Russia) were not scheduled to play at home on the last matchday (due to cold weather).

== Teams ==
Below were the participating teams (with their 2020 UEFA club coefficients), grouped by their seeding pot. They included:

- 26 teams which entered in this stage
- 6 winners of the play-off round (4 from Champions Path, 2 from League Path)

Key to colours
Group winners and runners-up advanced to round of 16
Third-placed teams entered Europa League round of 32

Pot 1 (by association rank)
| Assoc. | Team | Notes | Coeff. |
|---|---|---|---|
| 4 | (Germany) Bayern Munich | | 136.000 |
| — | (Spain) Sevilla | | 102.000 |
| 1 | (Spain) Real Madrid | | 134.000 |
| 2 | (England) Liverpool | | 99.000 |
| 3 | (Italy) Juventus | | 117.000 |
| 5 | (France) Paris Saint-Germain | | 113.000 |
| 6 | (Russia) Zenit Saint Petersburg | | 64.000 |
| 7 | (Portugal) Porto | | 75.000 |

Pot 2
| Team | Coeff. |
|---|---|
| (Spain) Barcelona | 128.000 |
| (Spain) Atlético Madrid | 127.000 |
| (England) Manchester City | 116.000 |
| (England) Manchester United | 100.000 |
| (Ukraine) Shakhtar Donetsk | 85.000 |
| (Germany) Borussia Dortmund | 85.000 |
| (England) Chelsea | 83.000 |
| (Netherlands) Ajax | 69.500 |

Pot 3
| Team | Notes | Coeff. |
|---|---|---|
| (Ukraine) Dynamo Kyiv | | 55.000 |
| (Austria) Red Bull Salzburg | | 53.500 |
| (Germany) RB Leipzig | | 49.000 |
| (Italy) Inter Milan | | 44.000 |
| (Greece) Olympiacos | | 43.000 |
| (Italy) Lazio | | 41.000 |
| (Russia) Krasnodar | | 35.500 |
| (Italy) Atalanta | | 33.500 |

Pot 4
| Team | Notes | Coeff. |
|---|---|---|
| (Russia) Lokomotiv Moscow | | 33.000 |
| (France) Marseille | | 31.000 |
| (Belgium) Club Brugge | | 28.500 |
| (Germany) Borussia Mönchengladbach | | 26.000 |
| (Turkey) İstanbul Başakşehir | | 21.500 |
| (Denmark) Midtjylland | | 14.500 |
| (France) Rennes | | 14.000 |
| (Hungary) Ferencváros | | 9.000 |

Notes

1. ^{TH} Champions League title holders, automatically placed into Pot 1 as top seed.
2. ^{EL} Europa League title holders, automatically placed into Pot 1 as second top seed.
3. ^{CP} Winners of play-off round (Champions Path).
4. ^{LP} Winners of play-off round (League Path).

== Format ==
In each group, teams played against each other home-and-away in a round-robin format. The group winners and runners-up advanced to the round of 16, while the third-placed teams entered the Europa League round of 32.

=== Tiebreakers ===
Teams were ranked according to points (3 points for a win, 1 point for a draw, 0 points for a loss). If two or more teams were tied on points, the following tiebreaking criteria were applied, in the order given, to determine the rankings (see Article 17 Equality of points – group stage, Regulations of the UEFA Champions League):

1. Points in head-to-head matches among the tied teams;
2. Goal difference in head-to-head matches among the tied teams;
3. Goals scored in head-to-head matches among the tied teams;
4. Away goals scored in head-to-head matches among the tied teams;
5. If more than two teams were tied, and after applying all head-to-head criteria above, a subset of teams are still tied, all head-to-head criteria above were reapplied exclusively to this subset of teams;
6. Goal difference in all group matches;
7. Goals scored in all group matches;
8. Away goals scored in all group matches;
9. Wins in all group matches;
10. Away wins in all group matches;
11. Disciplinary points (direct red card = 3 points; double yellow card = 3 points; single yellow card = 1 point);
12. UEFA club coefficient.

== Groups ==
The matchdays were 20–21 October, 27–28 October, 3–4 November, 24–25 November, 1–2 December, and 8–9 December 2020. The scheduled kickoff times were 21:00 CET/CEST, with two matches on each Tuesday and Wednesday scheduled for 18:55 CET/CEST.

Times were CET/CEST, (Note: CEST (UTC+2) for dates up to 24 October 2020 (matchday 1), and CET (UTC+1) for dates thereafter (matchdays 2–6).) as listed by UEFA (local times, if different, are in parentheses).

=== Group A ===
| Pos | Team | Pld | W | D | L | GF | GA | GD | Pts | Qualification | BAY | ATM | SAL | LMO |
|---|---|---|---|---|---|---|---|---|---|---|---|---|---|---|
| 1 | (Germany) Bayern Munich | 6 | 5 | 1 | 0 | 18 | 5 | +13 | 16 | Advance to knockout phase | — | 4–0 | 3–1 | 2–0 |
| 2 | (Spain) Atlético Madrid | 6 | 2 | 3 | 1 | 7 | 8 | −1 | 9 | Advance to knockout phase | 1–1 | — | 3–2 | 0–0 |
| 3 | (Austria) Red Bull Salzburg | 6 | 1 | 1 | 4 | 10 | 17 | −7 | 4 | Transfer to Europa League | 2–6 | 0–2 | — | 2–2 |
| 4 | (Russia) Lokomotiv Moscow | 6 | 0 | 3 | 3 | 5 | 10 | −5 | 3 | | 1–2 | 1–1 | 1–3 | — |

Source: UEFA
Rules for classification: Group stage tiebreakers
21 October 2020
18:55

| Red Bull Salzburg (Austria) | 2–2 | (Russia) Lokomotiv Moscow |
|---|---|---|
| Szoboszlai 45'; Junuzović 50' | Report | Eder 19'; Lisakovich 75' |

Stadion Wals-Siezenheim, Wals-Siezenheim
Attendance: 3,000
Referee: Serdar Gözübüyük (Netherlands)
21 October 2020
21:00

| Bayern Munich (Germany) | 4–0 | (Spain) Atlético Madrid |
|---|---|---|
| Coman 28', 72'; Goretzka 41'; Tolisso 66' | Report |

Allianz Arena, Munich
Attendance: 0 (Note: Due to the COVID-19 pandemic in Europe, the match was played behind closed doors.)
Referee: Michael Oliver (England)

27 October 2020
18:55 (20:55 UTC+3)

| Lokomotiv Moscow (Russia) | 1–2 | (Germany) Bayern Munich |
|---|---|---|
| An. Miranchuk 70' | Report | Goretzka 13'; Kimmich 79' |

RZD Arena, Moscow
Attendance: 8,196
Referee: István Kovács (Romania)
27 October 2020
21:00

| Atlético Madrid (Spain) | 3–2 | (Austria) Red Bull Salzburg |
|---|---|---|
| Llorente 29'; Félix 52', 85' | Report | Szoboszlai 40'; Felipe 47' (o.g.) |

Metropolitano Stadium, Madrid
Attendance: 0
Referee: Ovidiu Hațegan (Romania)

3 November 2020
18:55 (20:55 UTC+3)

| Lokomotiv Moscow (Russia) | 1–1 | (Spain) Atlético Madrid |
|---|---|---|
| An. Miranchuk 25' (pen.) | Report | Giménez 18' |

RZD Arena, Moscow
Attendance: 8,147
Referee: Benoît Bastien (France)
3 November 2020
21:00

| Red Bull Salzburg (Austria) | 2–6 | (Germany) Bayern Munich |
|---|---|---|
| Berisha 4'; Okugawa 66' | Report | Lewandowski 21' (pen.), 88'; Kristensen 44' (o.g.); Boateng 79'; Sané 83'; Hernandez 90+2' |

Stadion Wals-Siezenheim, Wals-Siezenheim
Attendance: 0
Referee: Danny Makkelie (Netherlands)

25 November 2020
21:00

| Atlético Madrid (Spain) | 0–0 | (Russia) Lokomotiv Moscow |
|---|---|---|
| | Report |

Metropolitano Stadium, Madrid
Attendance: 0
Referee: Slavko Vinčić (Slovenia)
25 November 2020
21:00

| Bayern Munich (Germany) | 3–1 | (Austria) Red Bull Salzburg |
|---|---|---|
| Lewandowski 43'; Coman 52'; Sané 68' | Report | Berisha 73' |

Allianz Arena, Munich
Attendance: 0
Referee: Orel Grinfeld (Israel)

1 December 2020
18:55 (20:55 UTC+3)

| Lokomotiv Moscow (Russia) | 1–3 | (Austria) Red Bull Salzburg |
|---|---|---|
| An. Miranchuk 79' (pen.) | Report | Berisha 28', 41'; Adeyemi 81' |

RZD Arena, Moscow
Attendance: 6,759
Referee: Ali Palabıyık (Turkey)
1 December 2020
21:00

| Atlético Madrid (Spain) | 1–1 | (Germany) Bayern Munich |
|---|---|---|
| Félix 26' | Report | Müller 86' (pen.) |

Metropolitano Stadium, Madrid
Attendance: 0
Referee: Clément Turpin (France)

9 December 2020
21:00

| Bayern Munich (Germany) | 2–0 | (Russia) Lokomotiv Moscow |
|---|---|---|
| Süle 63'; Choupo-Moting 80' | Report |

Allianz Arena, Munich
Attendance: 0
Referee: Sandro Schärer (Switzerland)
9 December 2020
21:00

| Red Bull Salzburg (Austria) | 0–2 | (Spain) Atlético Madrid |
|---|---|---|
| | Report | Hermoso 39'; Carrasco 86' |

Stadion Wals-Siezenheim, Wals-Siezenheim
Attendance: 0
Referee: Anthony Taylor (England)

=== Group B ===
| Pos | Team | Pld | W | D | L | GF | GA | GD | Pts | Qualification | RMA | BMG | SHK | INT |
|---|---|---|---|---|---|---|---|---|---|---|---|---|---|---|
| 1 | (Spain) Real Madrid | 6 | 3 | 1 | 2 | 11 | 9 | +2 | 10 | Advance to knockout phase | — | 2–0 | 2–3 | 3–2 |
| 2 | (Germany) Borussia Mönchengladbach | 6 | 2 | 2 | 2 | 16 | 9 | +7 | 8 (Note: Head-to-head points: Borussia Mönchengladbach 6, Shakhtar Donetsk 0.) | Advance to knockout phase | 2–2 | — | 4–0 | 2–3 |
| 3 | (Ukraine) Shakhtar Donetsk | 6 | 2 | 2 | 2 | 5 | 12 | −7 | 8 | Transfer to Europa League | 2–0 | 0–6 | — | 0–0 |
| 4 | (Italy) Inter Milan | 6 | 1 | 3 | 2 | 7 | 9 | −2 | 6 | | 0–2 | 2–2 | 0–0 | — |

Source: UEFA
Rules for classification: Group stage tiebreakers
Notes:
21 October 2020
18:55

| Real Madrid (Spain) | 2–3 | (Ukraine) Shakhtar Donetsk |
|---|---|---|
| Modrić 54'; Vinícius 59' | Report | Tetê 29'; Varane 33' (o.g.); Solomon 42' |

Alfredo di Stéfano, Madrid (Note: Real Madrid played their home matches at Alfredo Di Stéfano Stadium, Madrid, instead of their regular stadium Santiago Bernabéu, Madrid.)
Attendance: 0
Referee: Srđan Jovanović (Serbia)
21 October 2020
21:00

| Inter Milan (Italy) | 2–2 | (Germany) Borussia Mönchengladbach |
|---|---|---|
| Lukaku 49', 90' | Report | Bensebaini 63' (pen.); Hofmann 84' |

San Siro, Milan
Attendance: 1,000
Referee: Björn Kuipers (Netherlands)

27 October 2020
18:55 (19:55 UTC+2)

| Shakhtar Donetsk (Ukraine) | 0–0 | (Italy) Inter Milan |
|---|---|---|
| | Report |

Olympic Stadium, Kyiv (Note: Shakhtar Donetsk played their home matches at NSC Olimpiyskiy Stadium, Kyiv, instead of their regular stadium, the Donbas Arena in Donetsk, due to the war in Donbas.)
Attendance: 10,178
Referee: Georgi Kabakov (Bulgaria)
27 October 2020
21:00

| Borussia Mönchengladbach (Germany) | 2–2 | (Spain) Real Madrid |
|---|---|---|
| Thuram 33', 58' | Report | Benzema 87'; Casemiro 90+3' |

Borussia-Park, Mönchengladbach
Attendance: 0
Referee: Orel Grinfeld (Israel)

3 November 2020
18:55 (19:55 UTC+2)

| Shakhtar Donetsk (Ukraine) | 0–6 | (Germany) Borussia Mönchengladbach |
|---|---|---|
| | Report | Pléa 8', 26', 78'; Bondar 17' (o.g.); Bensebaini 44'; Stindl 65' |

Olympic Stadium, Kyiv
Attendance: 0
Referee: Serdar Gözübüyük (Netherlands)
3 November 2020
21:00

| Real Madrid (Spain) | 3–2 | (Italy) Inter Milan |
|---|---|---|
| Benzema 25'; Ramos 33'; Rodrygo 80' | Report | Martínez 35'; Perišić 68' |

Alfredo di Stéfano, Madrid
Attendance: 0
Referee: Clément Turpin (France)

25 November 2020
18:55

| Borussia Mönchengladbach (Germany) | 4–0 | (Ukraine) Shakhtar Donetsk |
|---|---|---|
| Stindl 17' (pen.); Elvedi 34'; Embolo 45+1'; Wendt 77' | Report |

Borussia-Park, Mönchengladbach
Attendance: 0
Referee: Cüneyt Çakır (Turkey)
25 November 2020
21:00

| Inter Milan (Italy) | 0–2 | (Spain) Real Madrid |
|---|---|---|
| | Report | Hazard 7' (pen.); Hakimi 59' (o.g.) |

San Siro, Milan
Attendance: 0
Referee: Anthony Taylor (England)

1 December 2020
18:55 (19:55 UTC+2)

| Shakhtar Donetsk (Ukraine) | 2–0 | (Spain) Real Madrid |
|---|---|---|
| Dentinho 57'; Solomon 82' | Report |

Olympic Stadium, Kyiv
Attendance: 0
Referee: Ovidiu Hațegan (Romania)
1 December 2020
21:00

| Borussia Mönchengladbach (Germany) | 2–3 | (Italy) Inter Milan |
|---|---|---|
| Pléa 45+1', 76' | Report | Darmian 17'; Lukaku 64', 73' |

Borussia-Park, Mönchengladbach
Attendance: 0
Referee: Danny Makkelie (Netherlands)

9 December 2020
21:00

| Real Madrid (Spain) | 2–0 | (Germany) Borussia Mönchengladbach |
|---|---|---|
| Benzema 9', 32' | Report |

Alfredo di Stéfano, Madrid
Attendance: 0
Referee: Björn Kuipers (Netherlands)
9 December 2020
21:00

| Inter Milan (Italy) | 0–0 | (Ukraine) Shakhtar Donetsk |
|---|---|---|
| | Report |

San Siro, Milan
Attendance: 0
Referee: Slavko Vinčić (Slovenia)

=== Group C ===
| Pos | Team | Pld | W | D | L | GF | GA | GD | Pts | Qualification | MCI | POR | OLY | MAR |
|---|---|---|---|---|---|---|---|---|---|---|---|---|---|---|
| 1 | (England) Manchester City | 6 | 5 | 1 | 0 | 13 | 1 | +12 | 16 | Advance to knockout phase | — | 3–1 | 3–0 | 3–0 |
| 2 | (Portugal) Porto | 6 | 4 | 1 | 1 | 10 | 3 | +7 | 13 | Advance to knockout phase | 0–0 | — | 2–0 | 3–0 |
| 3 | (Greece) Olympiacos | 6 | 1 | 0 | 5 | 2 | 10 | −8 | 3 (Note: Tied on head-to-head points (3). Head-to-head away goals: Olympiacos 1, Marseille 0.) | Transfer to Europa League | 0–1 | 0–2 | — | 1–0 |
| 4 | (France) Marseille | 6 | 1 | 0 | 5 | 2 | 13 | −11 | 3 | | 0–3 | 0–2 | 2–1 | — |

Source: UEFA
Rules for classification: Group stage tiebreakers
Notes:
21 October 2020
21:00 (20:00 UTC+1)

| Manchester City (England) | 3–1 | (Portugal) Porto |
|---|---|---|
| Agüero 20' (pen.); Gündoğan 65'; Torres 73' | Report | Díaz 14' |

City of Manchester Stadium, Manchester
Attendance: 0
Referee: Andris Treimanis (Latvia)
21 October 2020
21:00 (22:00 UTC+3)

| Olympiacos (Greece) | 1–0 | (France) Marseille |
|---|---|---|
| Hassan 90+1' | Report |

Karaiskakis Stadium, Piraeus
Attendance: 0
Referee: Daniele Orsato (Italy)

27 October 2020
21:00 (20:00 UTC+0)

| Porto (Portugal) | 2–0 | (Greece) Olympiacos |
|---|---|---|
| Vieira 11'; Oliveira 85' | Report |

Estádio do Dragão, Porto
Attendance: 2,450
Referee: Daniel Siebert (Germany)
27 October 2020
21:00

| Marseille (France) | 0–3 | (England) Manchester City |
|---|---|---|
| | Report | Torres 18'; Gündoğan 76'; Sterling 81' |

Stade Vélodrome, Marseille
Attendance: 0
Referee: Tobias Stieler (Germany)

3 November 2020
21:00 (20:00 UTC+0)

| Manchester City (England) | 3–0 | (Greece) Olympiacos |
|---|---|---|
| Torres 12'; Gabriel Jesus 81'; Cancelo 90' | Report |

City of Manchester Stadium, Manchester
Attendance: 0
Referee: Carlos del Cerro Grande (Spain)
3 November 2020
21:00 (20:00 UTC+0)

| Porto (Portugal) | 3–0 | (France) Marseille |
|---|---|---|
| Marega 4'; Oliveira 28' (pen.); Díaz 69' | Report |

Estádio do Dragão, Porto
Attendance: 0
Referee: Antonio Mateu Lahoz (Spain)

25 November 2020
18:55 (19:55 UTC+2)

| Olympiacos (Greece) | 0–1 | (England) Manchester City |
|---|---|---|
| | Report | Foden 36' |

Karaiskakis Stadium, Piraeus
Attendance: 0
Referee: Davide Massa (Italy)
25 November 2020
21:00

| Marseille (France) | 0–2 | (Portugal) Porto |
|---|---|---|
| | Report | Sanusi 39'; Oliveira 72' (pen.) |

Stade Vélodrome, Marseille
Attendance: 0
Referee: Andreas Ekberg (Sweden)

1 December 2020
21:00

| Marseille (France) | 2–1 | (Greece) Olympiacos |
|---|---|---|
| Payet 55' (pen.), 75' (pen.) | Report | Camara 33' |

Stade Vélodrome, Marseille
Attendance: 0
Referee: Jesús Gil Manzano (Spain)
1 December 2020
21:00 (20:00 UTC+0)

| Porto (Portugal) | 0–0 | (England) Manchester City |
|---|---|---|
| | Report |

Estádio do Dragão, Porto
Attendance: 0
Referee: Björn Kuipers (Netherlands)

9 December 2020
21:00 (20:00 UTC+0)

| Manchester City (England) | 3–0 | (France) Marseille |
|---|---|---|
| Torres 48'; Agüero 77'; Álvaro 90' (o.g.) | Report |

City of Manchester Stadium, Manchester
Attendance: 0
Referee: Halil Umut Meler (Turkey)
9 December 2020
21:00 (22:00 UTC+2)

| Olympiacos (Greece) | 0–2 | (Portugal) Porto |
|---|---|---|
| | Report | Otávio 10' (pen.); Uribe 77' |

Karaiskakis Stadium, Piraeus
Attendance: 0
Referee: Felix Brych (Germany)

=== Group D ===
| Pos | Team | Pld | W | D | L | GF | GA | GD | Pts | Qualification | LIV | ATA | AJX | MID |
|---|---|---|---|---|---|---|---|---|---|---|---|---|---|---|
| 1 | (England) Liverpool | 6 | 4 | 1 | 1 | 10 | 3 | +7 | 13 | Advance to knockout phase | — | 0–2 | 1–0 | 2–0 |
| 2 | (Italy) Atalanta | 6 | 3 | 2 | 1 | 10 | 8 | +2 | 11 | Advance to knockout phase | 0–5 | — | 2–2 | 1–1 |
| 3 | (Netherlands) Ajax | 6 | 2 | 1 | 3 | 7 | 7 | 0 | 7 | Transfer to Europa League | 0–1 | 0–1 | — | 3–1 |
| 4 | (Denmark) Midtjylland | 6 | 0 | 2 | 4 | 4 | 13 | −9 | 2 | | 1–1 | 0–4 | 1–2 | — |

Source: UEFA
Rules for classification: Group stage tiebreakers
21 October 2020
21:00

| Ajax (Netherlands) | 0–1 | (England) Liverpool |
|---|---|---|
| | Report | Tagliafico 35' (o.g.) |

Johan Cruyff Arena, Amsterdam
Attendance: 0
Referee: Felix Brych (Germany)
21 October 2020
21:00

| Midtjylland (Denmark) | 0–4 | (Italy) Atalanta |
|---|---|---|
| | Report | Zapata 26'; Gómez 36'; Muriel 42'; Miranchuk 89' |

MCH Arena, Herning
Attendance: 132
Referee: Artur Soares Dias (Portugal)

27 October 2020
21:00 (20:00 UTC+0)

| Liverpool (England) | 2–0 | (Denmark) Midtjylland |
|---|---|---|
| Jota 55'; Salah 90+3' (pen.) | Report |

Anfield, Liverpool
Attendance: 0
Referee: Paweł Raczkowski (Poland)
27 October 2020
21:00

| Atalanta (Italy) | 2–2 | (Netherlands) Ajax |
|---|---|---|
| Zapata 54', 60' | Report | Tadić 30' (pen.); Traoré 38' |

Stadio Atleti Azzurri d'Italia, Bergamo
Attendance: 0
Referee: Damir Skomina (Slovenia)

3 November 2020
21:00

| Midtjylland (Denmark) | 1–2 | (Netherlands) Ajax |
|---|---|---|
| Dreyer 18' | Report | Antony 1'; Tadić 13' |

MCH Arena, Herning
Attendance: 132
Referee: Bobby Madden (Scotland)
3 November 2020
21:00

| Atalanta (Italy) | 0–5 | (England) Liverpool |
|---|---|---|
| | Report | Jota 16', 33', 54'; Salah 47'; Mané 49' |

Stadio Atleti Azzurri d'Italia, Bergamo
Attendance: 0
Referee: Ovidiu Hațegan (Romania)

25 November 2020
21:00 (20:00 UTC+0)

| Liverpool (England) | 0–2 | (Italy) Atalanta |
|---|---|---|
| | Report | Iličić 60'; Gosens 64' |

Anfield, Liverpool
Attendance: 0
Referee: Carlos del Cerro Grande (Spain)
25 November 2020
21:00

| Ajax (Netherlands) | 3–1 | (Denmark) Midtjylland |
|---|---|---|
| Gravenberch 47'; Mazraoui 49'; Neres 66' | Report | Mabil 80' (pen.) |

Johan Cruyff Arena, Amsterdam
Attendance: 0
Referee: Sergei Karasev (Russia)

1 December 2020
21:00 (20:00 UTC+0)

| Liverpool (England) | 1–0 | (Netherlands) Ajax |
|---|---|---|
| Jones 58' | Report |

Anfield, Liverpool
Attendance: 0
Referee: Tobias Stieler (Germany)
1 December 2020
21:00

| Atalanta (Italy) | 1–1 | (Denmark) Midtjylland |
|---|---|---|
| Romero 79' | Report | Scholz 13' |

Stadio Atleti Azzurri d'Italia, Bergamo
Attendance: 0
Referee: Anastasios Sidiropoulos (Greece)

9 December 2020
18:55

| Ajax (Netherlands) | 0–1 | (Italy) Atalanta |
|---|---|---|
| | Report | Muriel 85' |

Johan Cruyff Arena, Amsterdam
Attendance: 0
Referee: Carlos del Cerro Grande (Spain)
9 December 2020
18:55

| Midtjylland (Denmark) | 1–1 | (England) Liverpool |
|---|---|---|
| Scholz 62' (pen.) | Report | Salah 1' |

MCH Arena, Herning
Attendance: 147
Referee: François Letexier (France)

=== Group E ===
| Pos | Team | Pld | W | D | L | GF | GA | GD | Pts | Qualification | CHE | SEV | KRA | REN |
|---|---|---|---|---|---|---|---|---|---|---|---|---|---|---|
| 1 | (England) Chelsea | 6 | 4 | 2 | 0 | 14 | 2 | +12 | 14 | Advance to knockout phase | — | 0–0 | 1–1 | 3–0 |
| 2 | (Spain) Sevilla | 6 | 4 | 1 | 1 | 9 | 8 | +1 | 13 | Advance to knockout phase | 0–4 | — | 3–2 | 1–0 |
| 3 | (Russia) Krasnodar | 6 | 1 | 2 | 3 | 6 | 11 | −5 | 5 | Transfer to Europa League | 0–4 | 1–2 | — | 1–0 |
| 4 | (France) Rennes | 6 | 0 | 1 | 5 | 3 | 11 | −8 | 1 | | 1–2 | 1–3 | 1–1 | — |

Source: UEFA
Rules for classification: Group stage tiebreakers
20 October 2020
21:00 (20:00 UTC+1)

| Chelsea (England) | 0–0 | (Spain) Sevilla |
|---|---|---|
| | Report |

Stamford Bridge, London
Attendance: 0
Referee: Davide Massa (Italy)
20 October 2020
21:00

| Rennes (France) | 1–1 | (Russia) Krasnodar |
|---|---|---|
| Guirassy 56' (pen.) | Report | Ramírez 59' |

Roazhon Park, Rennes
Attendance: 4,973
Referee: Anastasios Sidiropoulos (Greece)

28 October 2020
18:55 (20:55 UTC+3)

| Krasnodar (Russia) | 0–4 | (England) Chelsea |
|---|---|---|
| | Report | Hudson-Odoi 37'; Werner 76' (pen.); Ziyech 79'; Pulisic 90' |

Krasnodar Stadium, Krasnodar
Attendance: 10,544
Referee: Ali Palabıyık (Turkey)
28 October 2020
21:00

| Sevilla (Spain) | 1–0 | (France) Rennes |
|---|---|---|
| De Jong 55' | Report |

Ramón Sánchez Pizjuán, Seville
Attendance: 0
Referee: Cüneyt Çakır (Turkey)

4 November 2020
21:00

| Sevilla (Spain) | 3–2 | (Russia) Krasnodar |
|---|---|---|
| Rakitić 42'; En-Nesyri 69', 72' | Report | Suleymanov 17'; Berg 21' (pen.) |

Ramón Sánchez Pizjuán, Seville
Attendance: 0
Referee: Felix Brych (Germany)
4 November 2020
21:00 (20:00 UTC+0)

| Chelsea (England) | 3–0 | (France) Rennes |
|---|---|---|
| Werner 10' (pen.), 41' (pen.); Abraham 50' | Report |

Stamford Bridge, London
Attendance: 0
Referee: Felix Zwayer (Germany)

24 November 2020
18:55 (20:55 UTC+3)

| Krasnodar (Russia) | 1–2 | (Spain) Sevilla |
|---|---|---|
| Wanderson 56' | Report | Rakitić 4'; Munir 90+5' |

Krasnodar Stadium, Krasnodar
Attendance: 10,554
Referee: Marco Guida (Italy)
24 November 2020
18:55

| Rennes (France) | 1–2 | (England) Chelsea |
|---|---|---|
| Guirassy 85' | Report | Hudson-Odoi 22'; Giroud 90+1' |

Roazhon Park, Rennes
Attendance: 0
Referee: Björn Kuipers (Netherlands)

2 December 2020
18:55 (20:55 UTC+3)

| Krasnodar (Russia) | 1–0 | (France) Rennes |
|---|---|---|
| Berg 71' | Report |

Krasnodar Stadium, Krasnodar
Attendance: 8,747
Referee: Willie Collum (Scotland)
2 December 2020
21:00

| Sevilla (Spain) | 0–4 | (England) Chelsea |
|---|---|---|
| | Report | Giroud 8', 54', 74', 83' (pen.) |

Ramón Sánchez Pizjuán, Seville
Attendance: 0
Referee: Artur Soares Dias (Portugal)

8 December 2020
21:00 (20:00 UTC+0)

| Chelsea (England) | 1–1 | (Russia) Krasnodar |
|---|---|---|
| Jorginho 28' (pen.) | Report | Cabella 24' |

Stamford Bridge, London
Attendance: 2,000
Referee: Pavel Královec (Czech Republic)
8 December 2020
21:00

| Rennes (France) | 1–3 | (Spain) Sevilla |
|---|---|---|
| Rutter 86' (pen.) | Report | Koundé 32'; En-Nesyri 45+2', 81' |

Roazhon Park, Rennes
Attendance: 0
Referee: Bartosz Frankowski (Poland)

=== Group F ===
| Pos | Team | Pld | W | D | L | GF | GA | GD | Pts | Qualification | DOR | LAZ | BRU | ZEN |
|---|---|---|---|---|---|---|---|---|---|---|---|---|---|---|
| 1 | (Germany) Borussia Dortmund | 6 | 4 | 1 | 1 | 12 | 5 | +7 | 13 | Advance to knockout phase | — | 1–1 | 3–0 | 2–0 |
| 2 | (Italy) Lazio | 6 | 2 | 4 | 0 | 11 | 7 | +4 | 10 | Advance to knockout phase | 3–1 | — | 2–2 | 3–1 |
| 3 | (Belgium) Club Brugge | 6 | 2 | 2 | 2 | 8 | 10 | −2 | 8 | Transfer to Europa League | 0–3 | 1–1 | — | 3–0 |
| 4 | (Russia) Zenit Saint Petersburg | 6 | 0 | 1 | 5 | 4 | 13 | −9 | 1 | | 1–2 | 1–1 | 1–2 | — |

Source: UEFA
Rules for classification: Group stage tiebreakers
20 October 2020
18:55 (19:55 UTC+3)

| Zenit Saint Petersburg (Russia) | 1–2 | (Belgium) Club Brugge |
|---|---|---|
| Horvath 74' (o.g.) | Report | Dennis 63'; De Ketelaere 90+3' |

Krestovsky Stadium, Saint Petersburg
Attendance: 16,682
Referee: Benoît Bastien (France)
20 October 2020
21:00

| Lazio (Italy) | 3–1 | (Germany) Borussia Dortmund |
|---|---|---|
| Immobile 6'; Hitz 23' (o.g.); Akpa Akpro 76' | Report | Haaland 71' |

Stadio Olimpico, Rome
Attendance: 1,000
Referee: Clément Turpin (France)

28 October 2020
21:00

| Borussia Dortmund (Germany) | 2–0 | (Russia) Zenit Saint Petersburg |
|---|---|---|
| Sancho 78' (pen.); Haaland 90+1' | Report |

Westfalenstadion, Dortmund
Attendance: 0
Referee: Björn Kuipers (Netherlands)
28 October 2020
21:00

| Club Brugge (Belgium) | 1–1 | (Italy) Lazio |
|---|---|---|
| Vanaken 42' (pen.) | Report | Correa 14' |

Jan Breydel Stadium, Bruges
Attendance: 0
Referee: Anthony Taylor (England)

4 November 2020
18:55 (20:55 UTC+3)

| Zenit Saint Petersburg (Russia) | 1–1 | (Italy) Lazio |
|---|---|---|
| Yerokhin 32' | Report | Caicedo 82' |

Krestovsky Stadium, Saint Petersburg
Attendance: 17,427
Referee: Artur Soares Dias (Portugal)
4 November 2020
21:00

| Club Brugge (Belgium) | 0–3 | (Germany) Borussia Dortmund |
|---|---|---|
| | Report | Hazard 14'; Haaland 18', 32' |

Jan Breydel Stadium, Bruges
Attendance: 0
Referee: Damir Skomina (Slovenia)

24 November 2020
21:00

| Lazio (Italy) | 3–1 | (Russia) Zenit Saint Petersburg |
|---|---|---|
| Immobile 3', 55' (pen.); Parolo 22' | Report | Dzyuba 25' |

Stadio Olimpico, Rome
Attendance: 0
Referee: Michael Oliver (England)
24 November 2020
21:00

| Borussia Dortmund (Germany) | 3–0 | (Belgium) Club Brugge |
|---|---|---|
| Haaland 18', 60'; Sancho 45' | Report |

Westfalenstadion, Dortmund
Attendance: 0
Referee: Ivan Kružliak (Slovakia)

2 December 2020
21:00

| Borussia Dortmund (Germany) | 1–1 | (Italy) Lazio |
|---|---|---|
| Guerreiro 44' | Report | Immobile 67' (pen.) |

Westfalenstadion, Dortmund
Attendance: 0
Referee: Antonio Mateu Lahoz (Spain)
2 December 2020
21:00

| Club Brugge (Belgium) | 3–0 | (Russia) Zenit Saint Petersburg |
|---|---|---|
| De Ketelaere 33'; Vanaken 58' (pen.); Lang 73' | Report |

Jan Breydel Stadium, Bruges
Attendance: 0
Referee: Serdar Gözübüyük (Netherlands)

8 December 2020
18:55 (20:55 UTC+3)

| Zenit Saint Petersburg (Russia) | 1–2 | (Germany) Borussia Dortmund |
|---|---|---|
| Driussi 16' | Report | Piszczek 68'; Witsel 78' |

Krestovsky Stadium, Saint Petersburg
Attendance: 10,860
Referee: István Kovács (Romania)
8 December 2020
18:55

| Lazio (Italy) | 2–2 | (Belgium) Club Brugge |
|---|---|---|
| Correa 12'; Immobile 27' (pen.) | Report | Vormer 15'; Vanaken 76' |

Stadio Olimpico, Rome
Attendance: 0
Referee: Cüneyt Çakır (Turkey)

=== Group G ===
| Pos | Team | Pld | W | D | L | GF | GA | GD | Pts | Qualification | JUV | BAR | DKV | FER |
|---|---|---|---|---|---|---|---|---|---|---|---|---|---|---|
| 1 | (Italy) Juventus | 6 | 5 | 0 | 1 | 14 | 4 | +10 | 15 (Note: Tied on head-to-head points (3). Head-to-head goal difference: Juventus +1, Barcelona –1.) | Advance to knockout phase | — | 0–2 | 3–0 | 2–1 |
| 2 | (Spain) Barcelona | 6 | 5 | 0 | 1 | 16 | 5 | +11 | 15 | Advance to knockout phase | 0–3 | — | 2–1 | 5–1 |
| 3 | (Ukraine) Dynamo Kyiv | 6 | 1 | 1 | 4 | 4 | 13 | −9 | 4 | Transfer to Europa League | 0–2 | 0–4 | — | 1–0 |
| 4 | (Hungary) Ferencváros | 6 | 0 | 1 | 5 | 5 | 17 | −12 | 1 | | 1–4 | 0–3 | 2–2 | — |

Source: UEFA
Rules for classification: Group stage tiebreakers
Notes:
20 October 2020
18:55 (19:55 UTC+3)

| Dynamo Kyiv (Ukraine) | 0–2 | (Italy) Juventus |
|---|---|---|
| | Report | Morata 46', 84' |

Olympic Stadium, Kyiv
Attendance: 14,850
Referee: Ovidiu Hațegan (Romania)
20 October 2020
21:00

| Barcelona (Spain) | 5–1 | (Hungary) Ferencváros |
|---|---|---|
| Messi 27' (pen.); Fati 42'; Coutinho 52'; Pedri 82'; Dembélé 89' | Report | Kharatin 70' (pen.) |

Camp Nou, Barcelona
Attendance: 0
Referee: Sandro Schärer (Switzerland)

28 October 2020
21:00

| Juventus (Italy) | 0–2 | (Spain) Barcelona |
|---|---|---|
| | Report | Dembélé 14'; Messi 90+1' (pen.) |

Juventus Stadium, Turin
Attendance: 0
Referee: Danny Makkelie (Netherlands)
28 October 2020
21:00

| Ferencváros (Hungary) | 2–2 | (Ukraine) Dynamo Kyiv |
|---|---|---|
| Nguen 59'; Boli 90' | Report | Tsyhankov 28' (pen.); De Pena 41' |

Groupama Arena, Budapest
Attendance: 6,171
Referee: Ivan Kružliak (Slovakia)

4 November 2020
21:00

| Barcelona (Spain) | 2–1 | (Ukraine) Dynamo Kyiv |
|---|---|---|
| Messi 5' (pen.); Piqué 65' | Report | Tsyhankov 75' |

Camp Nou, Barcelona
Attendance: 0
Referee: Michael Oliver (England)
4 November 2020
21:00

| Ferencváros (Hungary) | 1–4 | (Italy) Juventus |
|---|---|---|
| Boli 90' | Report | Morata 7', 60'; Dybala 73'; Dvali 81' (o.g.) |

Puskás Aréna, Budapest (Note: Ferencváros played their home matches against Juventus and Barcelona at Puskás Aréna, Budapest, instead of their regular stadium Groupama Arena, Budapest.)
Attendance: 18,531
Referee: Orel Grinfeld (Israel)

24 November 2020
21:00 (22:00 UTC+2)

| Dynamo Kyiv (Ukraine) | 0–4 | (Spain) Barcelona |
|---|---|---|
| | Report | Dest 52'; Braithwaite 57', 70' (pen.); Griezmann 90+2' |

Olympic Stadium, Kyiv
Attendance: 0
Referee: Matej Jug (Slovenia)
24 November 2020
21:00

| Juventus (Italy) | 2–1 | (Hungary) Ferencváros |
|---|---|---|
| Ronaldo 35'; Morata 90+2' | Report | Uzuni 19' |

Juventus Stadium, Turin
Attendance: 0
Referee: Daniel Siebert (Germany)

2 December 2020
21:00

| Juventus (Italy) | 3–0 | (Ukraine) Dynamo Kyiv |
|---|---|---|
| Chiesa 21'; Ronaldo 57'; Morata 66' | Report |

Juventus Stadium, Turin
Attendance: 0
Referee: Stéphanie Frappart (France)
2 December 2020
21:00

| Ferencváros (Hungary) | 0–3 | (Spain) Barcelona |
|---|---|---|
| | Report | Griezmann 14'; Braithwaite 21'; Dembélé 28' (pen.) |

Puskás Aréna, Budapest
Attendance: 0
Referee: Aleksei Kulbakov (Belarus)

8 December 2020
21:00

| Barcelona (Spain) | 0–3 | (Italy) Juventus |
|---|---|---|
| | Report | Ronaldo 13' (pen.), 52' (pen.); McKennie 20' |

Camp Nou, Barcelona
Attendance: 0
Referee: Tobias Stieler (Germany)
8 December 2020
21:00 (22:00 UTC+2)

| Dynamo Kyiv (Ukraine) | 1–0 | (Hungary) Ferencváros |
|---|---|---|
| Popov 60' | Report |

Olympic Stadium, Kyiv
Attendance: 0
Referee: Andreas Ekberg (Sweden)

=== Group H ===
| Pos | Team | Pld | W | D | L | GF | GA | GD | Pts | Qualification | PAR | RBL | MUN | IBS |
|---|---|---|---|---|---|---|---|---|---|---|---|---|---|---|
| 1 | (France) Paris Saint-Germain | 6 | 4 | 0 | 2 | 13 | 6 | +7 | 12 (Note: Tied on head-to-head points (3). Head-to-head away goals: Paris Saint-Germain 1, RB Leipzig 0.) | Advance to knockout phase | — | 1–0 | 1–2 | 5–1 |
| 2 | (Germany) RB Leipzig | 6 | 4 | 0 | 2 | 11 | 12 | −1 | 12 | Advance to knockout phase | 2–1 | — | 3–2 | 2–0 |
| 3 | (England) Manchester United | 6 | 3 | 0 | 3 | 15 | 10 | +5 | 9 | Transfer to Europa League | 1–3 | 5–0 | — | 4–1 |
| 4 | (Turkey) İstanbul Başakşehir | 6 | 1 | 0 | 5 | 7 | 18 | −11 | 3 | | 0–2 | 3–4 | 2–1 | — |

Source: UEFA
Rules for classification: Group stage tiebreakers
Notes:
20 October 2020
21:00

| Paris Saint-Germain (France) | 1–2 | (England) Manchester United |
|---|---|---|
| Martial 55' (o.g.) | Report | Fernandes 23' (pen.); Rashford 87' |

Parc des Princes, Paris
Attendance: 0
Referee: Antonio Mateu Lahoz (Spain)
20 October 2020
21:00

| RB Leipzig (Germany) | 2–0 | (Turkey) İstanbul Başakşehir |
|---|---|---|
| Angeliño 16', 20' | Report |

Red Bull Arena, Leipzig
Attendance: 999
Referee: Jesús Gil Manzano (Spain)

28 October 2020
18:55 (20:55 UTC+3)

| İstanbul Başakşehir (Turkey) | 0–2 | (France) Paris Saint-Germain |
|---|---|---|
| | Report | Kean 64', 79' |

Başakşehir Fatih Terim Stadium, Istanbul
Attendance: 350
Referee: Andreas Ekberg (Sweden)
28 October 2020
21:00 (20:00 UTC+0)

| Manchester United (England) | 5–0 | (Germany) RB Leipzig |
|---|---|---|
| Greenwood 21'; Rashford 74', 78', 90+2'; Martial 87' (pen.) | Report |

Old Trafford, Manchester
Attendance: 577
Referee: Matej Jug (Slovenia)

4 November 2020
18:55 (20:55 UTC+3)

| İstanbul Başakşehir (Turkey) | 2–1 | (England) Manchester United |
|---|---|---|
| Ba 13'; Višća 40' | Report | Martial 43' |

Başakşehir Fatih Terim Stadium, Istanbul
Attendance: 350
Referee: Davide Massa (Italy)
4 November 2020
21:00

| RB Leipzig (Germany) | 2–1 | (France) Paris Saint-Germain |
|---|---|---|
| Nkunku 42'; Forsberg 57' (pen.) | Report | Di María 6' |

Red Bull Arena, Leipzig
Attendance: 0
Referee: Szymon Marciniak (Poland)

24 November 2020
21:00 (20:00 UTC+0)

| Manchester United (England) | 4–1 | (Turkey) İstanbul Başakşehir |
|---|---|---|
| Fernandes 7', 19'; Rashford 35' (pen.); James 90+2' | Report | Türüç 75' |

Old Trafford, Manchester
Attendance: 545
Referee: Ovidiu Hațegan (Romania)
24 November 2020
21:00

| Paris Saint-Germain (France) | 1–0 | (Germany) RB Leipzig |
|---|---|---|
| Neymar 11' (pen.) | Report |

Parc des Princes, Paris
Attendance: 0
Referee: Danny Makkelie (Netherlands)

2 December 2020
18:55 (20:55 UTC+3)

| İstanbul Başakşehir (Turkey) | 3–4 | (Germany) RB Leipzig |
|---|---|---|
| Kahveci 45+3', 72', 85' | Report | Poulsen 26'; Mukiele 43'; Olmo 66'; Sørloth 90+2' |

Başakşehir Fatih Terim Stadium, Istanbul
Attendance: 0
Referee: Carlos del Cerro Grande (Spain)
2 December 2020
21:00 (20:00 UTC+0)

| Manchester United (England) | 1–3 | (France) Paris Saint-Germain |
|---|---|---|
| Rashford 32' | Report | Neymar 6', 90+1'; Marquinhos 69' |

Old Trafford, Manchester
Attendance: 638
Referee: Daniele Orsato (Italy)

8 December 2020 (Note: The Paris Saint-Germain v İstanbul Başakşehir match was suspended after 14 minutes, with the score 0–0 at the time, as both teams left the pitch in protest after an alleged racist incident by a match official directed at the assistant manager of İstanbul Başakşehir; then resumed on 9 December 2020, 18:55 CET, with a new team of match officials.)
21:00

| Paris Saint-Germain (France) | 5–1 | (Turkey) İstanbul Başakşehir |
|---|---|---|
| Neymar 21', 38', 50'; Mbappé 42' (pen.), 62' | Report | Topal 57' |

Parc des Princes, Paris
Attendance: 0
Referee: Ovidiu Hațegan (Romania) and Danny Makkelie (Netherlands)
8 December 2020
21:00

| RB Leipzig (Germany) | 3–2 | (England) Manchester United |
|---|---|---|
| Angeliño 2'; Haidara 13'; Kluivert 69' | Report | Fernandes 80' (pen.); Konaté 82' (o.g.) |

Red Bull Arena, Leipzig
Attendance: 0
Referee: Antonio Mateu Lahoz (Spain)
