= 2016–17 Bayer 04 Leverkusen season =

Bayer Leverkusen
2016–17 season
- Sporting Director: Rudi Völler
- Manager: Roger Schmidt (until 5 March); Tayfun Korkut (from 6 March)
- Stadium: BayArena
- Bundesliga: 12th
- DFB-Pokal: Second round
- Champions League: Round of 16
- Top goalscorer: League: Javier Hernández (11 goals); All: Javier Hernández (13 goals)
- Biggest win: Hertha 2–6 Leverkusen
- Biggest defeat: Dortmund 6–2 Leverkusen
Home colours	Away colours	Third colours

The 2016–17 Bayer 04 Leverkusen season was the 113th season in the club's football history.

== Players ==
=== Squad ===
Note: Flags indicate national team as defined under FIFA eligibility rules; some limited exceptions apply. Players may hold more than one non-FIFA nationality.

No.	Pos.	Nation	Player
1	GK	GER	Bernd Leno
4	DF	GER	Jonathan Tah
6	DF	AUT	Aleksandar Dragović
7	FW	MEX	Javier Hernández
8	MF	GER	Lars Bender (Captain)
9	FW	JAM	Leon Bailey
10	MF	TUR	Hakan Çalhanoğlu
11	FW	GER	Stefan Kießling
13	DF	GER	Roberto Hilbert
14	FW	SUI	Admir Mehmedi
15	MF	AUT	Julian Baumgartlinger
16	DF	CRO	Tin Jedvaj
17	FW	FIN	Joel Pohjanpalo
18	DF	BRA	Wendell
19	FW	GER	Julian Brandt

No.	Pos.	Nation	Player
20	MF	CHI	Charles Aránguiz
21	DF	TUR	Ömer Toprak (Vice-captain)
22	DF	GER	Joel Abu Hanna
23	DF	GER	Danny da Costa
28	GK	AUT	Ramazan Özcan
29	MF	GER	Kai Havertz
30	MF	GER	Sam Schreck
31	FW	GER	Kevin Volland
33	DF	GER	Lukas Boeder
35	MF	UKR	Vladlen Yurchenko
36	GK	GER	Niklas Lomb
38	MF	GER	Karim Bellarabi
39	MF	GER	Benjamin Henrichs
44	MF	SLO	Kevin Kampl

=== Transfers ===
==== In ====
No.	Pos.	Name	Age	EU	Moving from	Type	Transfer Window	Contract ends	Transfer fee	Sources
6	Defender	Aleksandar Dragović	25	Yes	Dynamo Kyiv	Transfer	Summer	30 June 2021	€18 million	
15	Midfielder	Julian Baumgartlinger	28	Yes	Mainz 05	Transfer	Summer	30 June 2020	€4 million	
17	Forward	Joel Pohjanpalo	21	Yes	Fortuna Düsseldorf	Return from loan	Summer	30 June 2018	Free	
22	Defender	Joël Abu Hanna	18	Yes	Bayer Leverkusen U19	Academy	Summer	30 June 2019	—	
23	Defender	Danny da Costa	22	Yes	FC Ingolstadt	Transfer	Summer	30 June 2019	€500,000	
28	Goalkeeper	Ramazan Özcan	33	Yes	FC Ingolstadt	Transfer	Summer	30 June 2019	€500,000	
30	Midfielder	Sam Schreck	17	Yes	FC St. Pauli U17	Transfer	Summer	30 June 2018	Free	
31	Forward	Kevin Volland	23	Yes	1899 Hoffenheim	Transfer	Summer	30 June 2021	€20 million	
36	Goalkeeper	Niklas Lomb	22	Yes	Preußen Münster	Return from loan	Summer	30 June 2017	—	
—	Midfielder	Levin Öztunalı	22	Yes	Werder Bremen	Return from loan	Summer	—	—	
—	Forward	Ryu Seung-woo	22	No	Arminia Bielefeld	Return from loan	Summer	30 June 2018	—	
—	Forward	Patrik Džalto	19	Yes	Bayer Leverkusen U19	Academy	Summer	30 June 2018	—	
—	Forward	Andrejs Cigaņiks	19	Yes	Bayer Leverkusen U19	Academy	Summer	30 June 2018	—	
—	Midfielder	Jonas Meffert	21	Yes	Karlsruher SC	Transfer	Summer	—	€600,000	
—	Defender	Malcolm Cacutalua	22	Yes	VfL Bochum	Return from loan	Summer	—	—	
—	Forward	Marc Brašnić	19	Yes	SC Paderborn	Return from loan	Summer	30 June 2018	—	
—	Midfielder	Maximilian Wagener	21	Yes	Mainz 05 II	Return from loan	Summer	—	—	
9	Forward	Leon Bailey	19	No	Genk	Transfer	Winter	30 June 2022	€13.5 million	
—	Defender	Kyriakos Papadopoulos	24	Yes	RB Leipzig	Return from loan	Winter	30 June 2020	—	

==== Out ====
No.	Pos.	Name	Age	EU	Moving to	Type	Transfer Window	Transfer fee	Sources
2	Defender	André Ramalho	24	No	Mainz 05	Loan	Summer	€500,000	
5	Defender	Kyriakos Papadopoulos	24	Yes	RB Leipzig	Loan	Summer	€1.5 million	
6	Midfielder	Levin Öztunalı	20	Yes	Mainz 05	Transfer	Summer	€5 million	
17	Defender	Sebastian Boenisch	29	Yes	—	Release	Summer	—	
22	Goalkeeper	David Yelldell	34	Yes	Sonnenhof Großaspach	Transfer	Summer	Free	
23	Midfielder	Christoph Kramer	25	Yes	Borussia Mönchengladbach	Transfer	Summer	€15 million	
24	Forward	Ryu Seung-woo	22	No	Ferencváros	Transfer	Summer	Free	
25	Goalkeeper	Dario Krešić	32	Yes	Omonia	Transfer	Summer	Free	
32	Defender	Malcolm Cacutalua	21	Yes	Arminia Bielefeld	Transfer	Summer	Undisclosed	
34	Defender	Robin Becker	19	Yes	1. FC Heidenheim	Loan	Summer	—	
37	Midfielder	Marlon Frey	20	Yes	1. FC Kaiserslautern	Loan	Summer	—	
—	Midfielder	Jonas Meffert	21	Yes	SC Freiburg	Transfer	Summer	€1.2 million	
—	Forward	Marc Brašnić	19	Yes	Fortuna Köln	Loan	Summer	—	
—	Midfielder	Maximilian Wagener	21	Yes	SG Wattenscheid 09	Transfer	Summer	Free	
—	Forward	Patrik Džalto	19	Yes	SSV Jahn Regensburg	Loan	Summer	—	
—	Forward	Andrejs Cigaņiks	20	Yes	Viktoria Köln	Loan	Summer	—	
—	Defender	Kyriakos Papadopoulos	24	Yes	Hamburger SV	Loan	Winter	—	
27	Forward	Robbie Kruse	28	No	Liaoning	Transfer	Winter	€500,000	
32	Defender	Lukas Boeder	19	Yes	SC Paderborn 07	Loan	Winter	—	

== Friendly matches ==
Win Draw Loss

15 July 2016 Friendly	SC Verl	1–1	Bayer Leverkusen	Verl, Germany
19:00 CEST (UTC+2)	Veselinović 86' (pen.)	Report	Brüseke 89' (o.g.)	Stadium: SPORTCLUB ARENA

17 July 2016 Friendly	Delbrücker SC	0–4	Bayer Leverkusen	Delbrück, Germany
15:00 CEST (UTC+2)		Report	Volland 3', 6'; Kampl 42'; Öztunalı 53'	Stadium: Stadion Laumeskamp

22 July 2016 Friendly	TuS Koblenz	0–4	Bayer Leverkusen	Koblenz, Germany
18:30 CEST (UTC+2)		Report	Antonaci 15' (o.g.); Volland 25', 35'; Brandt 88'	Stadium: Stadion Oberwerth

27 July 2016 Friendly	Bayer Leverkusen	1–1	Porto	Bergisch Gladbach, Germany
18:00 CEST (UTC+2)	Hernández 58'	Report	Silva 8'	Stadium: BELKAW-Arena

30 July 2016 Friendly	Teutonia Watzenborn-Steinberg	0–0; Abandoned	Bayer Leverkusen	Zell am See, Austria
18:00 CEST (UTC+2)		Report		Stadium: Alois Latini Stadion; Referee: Florian Jäger (Austria)
Note: The match ended in the 12th minute due to a thunderstorm.

4 August 2016 Friendly	Bayer Leverkusen	3–1	Fiorentina	Zell am See, Austria
18:00 CEST (UTC+2)	Öztunalı 8'; Mehmedi 61'; Kampl 78'	Report	Kalinić 73'	Stadium: Alois Latini Stadion

9 August 2016 Friendly	Kickers Offenbach	1–2	Bayer Leverkusen	Offenbach am Main, Germany
19:00 CEST (UTC+2)	Firat 33'	Report	Hernández 8'; Mehmedi 81'	Stadium: Sparda-Bank-Hessen-Stadion; Attendance: 3,000

13 August 2016 Friendly	Bayer Leverkusen	2–0	Real Sociedad	Leverkusen, Germany
14:30 CEST (UTC+2)	Volland 35'; Hernández 38'	Report		Stadium: BayArena; Attendance: 23,216

8 January 2017 Florida Cup	Estudiantes	1–1 (2–4 p)	Bayer Leverkusen	St. Petersburg, Florida, USA
14:00 EST (UTC-5)	Umeres 33'	Report	Schreck 70'	Stadium: Al Lang Stadium; Referee: Vincent Apple-Chiarella
	Penalties
	Aguirregaray (penalty missed); González Pírez (penalty scored); Marchioni (penalty scored); Diarte (penalty missed)		Kießling (penalty scored); Aránguiz (penalty scored); Mehmedi (penalty missed); Brandt (penalty scored); Dragović (penalty scored)

11 January 2017 Florida Cup	Bayer Leverkusen	1–0	Atlético Mineiro	Bay Lake, Florida, USA
19:00 EST (UTC-5)	Chicharito 52'	Report		Stadium: ESPN Wide World of Sports Complex; Referee: Matthew Miscannon

== Competitions ==
Win Draw Loss

=== Overview ===
Competition	First match	Last match	Starting round	Final position	Record							
Competition	First match	Last match	Starting round	Final position	Pld	W	D	L	GF	GA	GD	Win %
Bundesliga	27 August 2016	20 May 2017	Matchday 1	12th	34	11	8	15	53	55	−2	32.35
DFB-Pokal	21 August 2016	25 October 2016	First round	Second round	2	1	1	0	4	3	+1	50.00
Champions League	14 September 2016	15 March 2017	Group stage	Round of 16	8	2	5	1	10	8	+2	25.00
Total					44	14	14	16	67	66	+1	31.82

Last updated: 27 May 2017
Source: Competitions

=== Bundesliga ===
==== League table ====
Pos	Team	Pld	W	D	L	GF	GA	GD	Pts
10	Schalke 04	34	11	10	13	45	40	+5	43
11	Eintracht Frankfurt	34	11	9	14	36	43	−7	42
12	Bayer Leverkusen	34	11	8	15	53	55	−2	41
13	FC Augsburg	34	9	11	14	35	51	−16	38
14	Hamburger SV	34	10	8	16	33	61	−28	38

Source: DFB
Rules for classification: 1) Points; 2) Goal difference; 3) Goals scored; 4) Head-to-head points; 5) Head-to-head goal difference; 6) Head-to-head away goals scored; 7) Away goals scored; 8) Play-off.

==== Results summary ====
Overall								Home						Away					
Pld	W	D	L	GF	GA	GD	Pts	W	D	L	GF	GA	GD	W	D	L	GF	GA	GD
34	11	8	15	53	55	−2	41	5	6	6	27	28	−1	6	2	9	26	27	−1

Last updated: 27 May 2017.
Source: Bundesliga

==== Results by round ====
Round	1	2	3	4	5	6	7	8	9	10	11	12	13	14	15	16	17	18	19	20	21	22	23	24	25	26	27	28	29	30	31	32	33	34
Ground	A	H	A	H	A	H	A	H	A	H	H	A	H	A	H	A	H	H	A	H	A	H	A	H	A	H	A	A	H	A	H	A	H	A
Result	L	W	L	D	W	W	L	L	W	W	L	L	D	W	L	D	W	L	L	W	W	L	L	D	L	D	W	L	D	L	L	D	D	W
Position	12	6	11	12	10	6	10	11	10	8	9	10	9	8	9	9	8	9	9	9	8	8	10	10	11	11	10	12	12	12	12	12	12	12

Updated to match(es) played on 27 May 2017. Source: Bundesliga
A = Away; H = Home; W = Win; D = Draw; L = Loss

==== Matches ====
27 August 2016 1	Borussia Mönchengladbach	2–1	Bayer Leverkusen	Mönchengladbach
18:30 CEST (UTC+2)	Kramer (yellow card) 40'; Hahn 45+1'; Stindl (yellow card) 74', (goal) 85'; Strobl (yellow card) 90+4'	Report	Toprak (yellow card) 64'; Bellarabi (yellow card) 74'; Wendell (yellow card) 75'; Pohjanpalo 79'	Stadium: BORUSSIA-PARK; Attendance: 52,183; Referee: Felix Brych

10 September 2016 2	Bayer Leverkusen	3–1	Hamburger SV	Leverkusen
15:30 CEST (UTC+2)	Tah (yellow card) 71'; Pohjanpalo 79', 90+1', 90+4'; Kampl (yellow card) 90'	Report	Wood 58'; Hunt (yellow card) 83'	Stadium: BayArena; Attendance: 30,210; Referee: Tobias Welz

17 September 2016 3	Eintracht Frankfurt	2–1	Bayer Leverkusen	Frankfurt
15:30 CEST (UTC+2)	Meier 53', (yellow card) 68'; Fabián (yellow card) 73', (goal) 79'; Chandler (yellow card) 87'	Report	Hernández 60'	Stadium: Commerzbank-Arena; Attendance: 43,000; Referee: Christian Dingert

21 September 2016 4	Bayer Leverkusen	0–0	FC Augsburg	Leverkusen
20:00 CEST (UTC+2)		Report	Verhaegh (yellow card) 46'; Gouweleeuw (yellow card) 71'	Stadium: BayArena; Attendance: 24,097; Referee: Jochen Drees

24 September 2016 5	Mainz 05	2–3	Bayer Leverkusen	Mainz
15:30 CEST (UTC+2)	Brosinski (yellow card) 11'; Mallı 31'; Bell 35', (yellow card) 42'; Córdoba (yellow card) 45'	Report	Dragović (yellow card) 21'; Hernández 32', 66', 90+2'; Aránguiz (yellow card) 45+1'	Stadium: OPEL ARENA; Attendance: 25,274; Referee: Günter Perl

1 October 2016 6	Bayer Leverkusen	2–0	Borussia Dortmund	Leverkusen
18:30 CEST (UTC+2)	Mehmedi 10'; Aránguiz (yellow card) 14'; Kampl (yellow card) 37'; Hernández (yellow card) 40', (goal) 79'; Toprak (yellow card) 62'; Çalhanoğlu (yellow card) 88'	Report	Ginter (yellow card) 74'	Stadium: BayArena; Attendance: 30,210; Referee: Manuel Gräfe

15 October 2016 7	Werder Bremen	2–1	Bayer Leverkusen	Bremen
18:30 CEST (UTC+2)	Junuzović 13'; Hajrović (yellow card) 52'; Manneh 59', (yellow card) 90+1'	Report	Çalhanoğlu 27'; Aránguiz (yellow card) 55'; Wendell (yellow card) 69'	Stadium: Weser-Stadion; Attendance: 41,000; Referee: Marco Fritz

22 October 2016 8	Bayer Leverkusen	0–3	1899 Hoffenheim	Leverkusen
15:30 CEST (UTC+2)	Volland (red card) 6'	Report	Demirbay 15'; Rudy (yellow card) 45+1'; Wagner 49'; Zuber 60'	Stadium: BayArena; Attendance: 28,716; Referee: Bastian Dankert

29 October 2016 9	VfL Wolfsburg	1–2	Bayer Leverkusen	Wolfsburg
15:30 CEST (UTC+2)	Arnold 37'; Brekalo (yellow card) 80'	Report	Mehmedi (yellow card) 59', (goal) 79'; Bender (yellow card) 65'; Wendell (yellow card) 71'; Jedvaj 83'	Stadium: VOLKSWAGEN ARENA; Attendance: 26,398; Referee: Tobias Stieler

5 November 2016 10	Bayer Leverkusen	3–2	Darmstadt 98	Leverkusen
15:30 CET (UTC+1)	Çalhanoğlu 32'; Brandt 56'; Aránguiz 69'	Report	Čolak 47'; Vrančić 85'; Guwara (yellow card) 90+1'	Stadium: BayArena; Attendance: 28,941; Referee: Harm Osmers

18 November 2016 11	Bayer Leverkusen	2–3	RB Leipzig	Leverkusen
20:30 CET (UTC+1)	Kampl 1'; Brandt 45+2'; Toprak (yellow card) 73'	Report	Baumgartlinger 4' (o.g.); Orban (yellow card) 51', (goal) 81'; Ilsanker (yellow card) 53'; Keïta (yellow card) 56'; Forsberg 67'	Stadium: BayArena; Attendance: 27,752; Referee: Felix Brych

26 November 2016 12	Bayern Munich	2–1	Bayer Leverkusen	Munich
18:30 CET (UTC+1)	Thiago 30'; Hummels 56'	Report	Çalhanoğlu 35'	Stadium: Allianz Arena; Attendance: 75,000; Referee: Marco Fritz

3 December 2016 13	Bayer Leverkusen	1–1	SC Freiburg	Leverkusen
15:30 CET (UTC+1)	Çalhanoğlu 60'	Report	Haberer 30'; Schuster (yellow card) 41'	Stadium: BayArena; Attendance: 27,111; Referee: Benjamin Cortus

11 December 2016 14	Schalke 04	0–1	Bayer Leverkusen	Gelsenkirchen
17:30 CET (UTC+1)	Naldo (red card) 4'; Meyer (yellow card) 13'; Baba (yellow card) 81'; Kehrer (yellow card) 88'	Report	Toprak (yellow card) 13'; Baumgartlinger (yellow card) 38'; Kießling 89'; Havertz (yellow card) 90+3'	Stadium: VELTINS-Arena; Attendance: 60,821; Referee: Deniz Aytekin

18 December 2016 15	Bayer Leverkusen	1–2	FC Ingolstadt	Leverkusen
17:30 CET (UTC+1)	Aránguiz (yellow card) 35' (yellow-red card) 49'; Jedvaj (yellow card) 58'; Mehmedi 63'	Report	Morales 26'; Cohen 73'; Tisserand (yellow card) 76'; Matip (yellow card) 85'	Stadium: BayArena; Attendance: 25,075; Referee: Frank Willenborg

21 December 2016 16	1. FC Köln	1–1	Bayer Leverkusen	Cologne
20:00 CET (UTC+1)	Modeste 21'	Report	Wendell 44'	Stadium: RheinEnergieSTADION; Attendance: 50,000; Referee: Manuel Gräfe

22 January 2017 17	Bayer Leverkusen	3–1	Hertha BSC	Leverkusen
15:30 CET (UTC+1)	Toprak 12'; Çalhanoğlu 36' (pen.), 88'	Report	Stocker 44', (yellow card) 55'; Ibišević (yellow card) 53'	Stadium: BayArena; Attendance: 26,904; Referee: Tobias Stieler

28 January 2017 18	Bayer Leverkusen	2–3	Borussia Mönchengladbach	Leverkusen
18:30 CET (UTC+1)	Tah 31'; Hernández 34'	Report	Stindl 52', 58'; Raffael 71'	Stadium: BayArena; Attendance: 28,869; Referee: Deniz Aytekin

3 February 2017 19	Hamburger SV	1–0	Bayer Leverkusen	Hamburg
20:30 CET (UTC+1)	Papadopoulos 76'	Report	Bellarabi (yellow card) 38'; Kampl (yellow card) 69'; Wendell (yellow card) 79'	Stadium: Volksparkstadion; Attendance: 45,653; Referee: Jochen Drees

11 February 2017 20	Bayer Leverkusen	3–0	Eintracht Frankfurt	Leverkusen
15:30 CET (UTC+1)	Hernández 5', 63'; Boeder (yellow card) 21'; Toprak (yellow card) 37'; Volland 78'	Report	Gaćinović (yellow card) 36'	Stadium: BayArena; Attendance: 28,882; Referee: Benjamin Cortus

17 February 2017 21	FC Augsburg	1–3	Bayer Leverkusen	Augsburg
20:30 CET (UTC+1)	Max (yellow card) 45'; Kohr 60', (yellow card) 87'; Verhaegh (yellow card) 61'	Report	Bellarabi 23'; Hernández 40', 65'; Wendell (yellow card) 76'	Stadium: WWK ARENA; Attendance: 25,010; Referee: Harm Osmers

25 February 2017 22	Bayer Leverkusen	0–2	Mainz 05	Leverkusen
15:30 CET (UTC+1)	Bender (yellow card) 10'	Report	Bell 3'; Öztunalı 11'; Muto (yellow card) 74'; Latza (yellow card) 83'; Gbamin (yellow card) 90+4'	Stadium: BayArena; Attendance: 27,086; Referee: Benjamin Brand

4 March 2017 23	Borussia Dortmund	6–2	Bayer Leverkusen	Dortmund
15:30 CET (UTC+1)	Dembélé 6'; Aubameyang 26', 69'; Pulisic 77'; Schürrle 85' (pen.); Guerreiro 90+2'	Report	Aránguiz (yellow card) 16'; Havertz (yellow card) 37'; Bellarabi (yellow card) 45+3'; Volland 48', (yellow card) 63'; Bender (yellow card) 69'; Wendell 74', (yellow card) 84'	Stadium: SIGNAL IDUNA PARK; Attendance: 79,100; Referee: Christian Dingert

10 March 2017 24	Bayer Leverkusen	1–1	Werder Bremen	Leverkusen
20:30 CET (UTC+1)	Volland 7'; Wendell (yellow card) 20' (yellow-red card) 90'	Report	Gebre Selassie (yellow card) 66'; Pizarro 79', (yellow card) 80'	Stadium: BayArena; Attendance: 30,210; Referee: Tobias Stieler

18 March 2017 25	1899 Hoffenheim	1–0	Bayer Leverkusen	Sinsheim
15:30 CET (UTC+1)	Szalai (yellow card) 26'; Wagner 62'	Report	Volland (yellow card) 23'	Stadium: WIRSOL Rhein-Neckar-Arena; Attendance: 28,117; Referee: Manuel Gräfe

2 April 2017 26	Bayer Leverkusen	3–3	VfL Wolfsburg	Leverkusen
17:30 CEST (UTC+2)	Bellarabi 40'; Volland 65'; Aránguiz (yellow card) 81'; Havertz 89'	Report	Bazoer (yellow card) 39'; Gómez 80', 83', 87' (pen.); Luiz Gustavo (yellow card) 90'	Stadium: BayArena; Attendance: 28,675; Referee: Deniz Aytekin

5 April 2017 27	Darmstadt 98	0–2	Bayer Leverkusen	Darmstadt
20:00 CEST (UTC+2)		Report	Brandt 15'; Jedvaj (yellow card) 36'; Toprak (yellow card) 39'; Volland 56'	Stadium: Jonathan-Heimes-Stadion am Böllenfalltor; Attendance: 16,200; Referee: Benjamin Brand

8 April 2017 28	RB Leipzig	1–0	Bayer Leverkusen	Leipzig
15:30 CEST (UTC+2)	Orban (yellow card) 4' (yellow-red card) 88'; Poulsen 90+3'	Report	Wendell (yellow card) 58'	Stadium: Red Bull Arena; Attendance: 42,558; Referee: Robert Kampka

15 April 2017 29	Bayer Leverkusen	0–0	Bayern Munich	Leverkusen
18:30 CEST (UTC+2)	Aránguiz (yellow card) 37'; Jedvaj (yellow card) 50' (yellow-red card) 59'	Report		Stadium: BayArena; Attendance: 30,210; Referee: Daniel Siebert

23 April 2017 30	SC Freiburg	2–1	Bayer Leverkusen	Freiburg im Breisgau
15:30 CEST (UTC+2)	Petersen 11'; Kempf (yellow card) 39'; Stenzel 88'; Ignjovski (yellow card) 90'	Report	Hilbert (yellow card) 55'; Volland 60' (pen.); Bailey (yellow card) 90'	Stadium: Schwarzwald-Stadion; Attendance: 24,000; Referee: Felix Brych

28 April 2017 31	Bayer Leverkusen	1–4	Schalke 04	Leverkusen
20:30 CEST (UTC+2)	Hilbert (yellow card) 25'; Kampl (yellow card) 49'; Kießling 69'; Bellarabi (yellow card) 70'	Report	Burgstaller 6', 50'; Höwedes 10'; Schöpf 18'	Stadium: BayArena; Attendance: 30,210; Referee: Marco Fritz

6 May 2017 32	FC Ingolstadt	1–1	Bayer Leverkusen	Ingolstadt
15:30 CEST (UTC+2)	Leckie (yellow card) 23'; Kittel 73'	Report	Aránguiz (yellow card) 35'; Volland (yellow card) 60'; Henrichs (yellow card) 68'; Havertz 78'	Stadium: Audi Sportpark; Attendance: 14,351; Referee: Harm Osmers

13 May 2017 33	Bayer Leverkusen	2–2	1. FC Köln	Leverkusen
15:30 CEST (UTC+2)	Kießling 60'; Pohjanpalo 71'	Report	Jojić 14'; Klünter 49'; Lehmann (yellow card) 62'; Rausch (yellow card) 90+2'	Stadium: BayArena; Attendance: 30,210; Referee: Günter Perl

20 May 2017 34	Hertha BSC	2–6	Bayer Leverkusen	Berlin
15:30 CEST (UTC+2)	Allan (yellow card) 12'; Ibišević (yellow card) 36'; Darida (yellow card) 63'; Weiser 71'; Allagui 86' (pen.)	Report	Hernández 5'; Havertz 31', 45+1'; Wendell (yellow card) 60'; Kießling 64' (pen.); Aránguiz 81' (pen.); Pohjanpalo 90'	Stadium: Olympiastadion Berlin; Attendance: 55,617; Referee: Deniz Aytekin

=== DFB-Pokal ===
21 August 2016 First round	SC Hauenstein	1–2	Bayer Leverkusen	Pirmasens
15:30 CEST (UTC+2)	Ando (yellow card) 41'; Brechtel (yellow card) 55'; Klück (yellow card) 56'; Srzentić 81'; Haag (yellow card) 90+3'	Report	Hernández 39', (yellow card) 77'; Bellarabi 67'; Jedvaj (yellow card) 90+3'	Stadium: Sportpark Husterhöhe; Attendance: 4,000; Referee: Florian Badstübner

25 October 2016 Second round	Sportfreunde Lotte	2–2 (a.e.t.) (4–3 p)	Bayer Leverkusen	Lotte
18:30 CEST (UTC+2)	Pires-Rodrigues (yellow card) 28'; Langlitz (yellow card) 32'; Hilbert 47' (o.g.); Wendel (yellow card) 63' (yellow-red card) 78'; Rosinger (yellow card) 83'; Freiberger 105+1'	Report	Volland 25', 95', (yellow card) 71'; Dragović (yellow card) 28'; Hernández (yellow card) 32'; Aránguiz (yellow card) 96'; Wendell (yellow card) 116'	Stadium: FRIMO Stadion; Attendance: 8,763; Referee: Tobias Welz
	Penalties
	Nauber (penalty missed); Freiberger (penalty missed); Steinhart (penalty scored); Dej (penalty scored); Langlitz (penalty scored); Tankulić (penalty scored)		(penalty missed) Aránguiz; (penalty scored) Havertz; (penalty missed) Volland; (penalty scored) Hilbert; (penalty scored) Wendell; (penalty missed) Baumgartlinger

=== UEFA Champions League ===
==== Group stage ====
Pos	Team	Pld	W	D	L	GF	GA	GD	Pts	Qualification	MON	LEV	TOT	CSKA
1	(France) Monaco	6	3	2	1	9	7	+2	11	Advance to knockout phase	—	1–1	2–1	3–0
2	(Germany) Bayer Leverkusen	6	2	4	0	8	4	+4	10	Advance to knockout phase	3–0	—	0–0	2–2
3	(England) Tottenham Hotspur	6	2	1	3	6	6	0	7	Transfer to Europa League	1–2	0–1	—	3–1
4	(Russia) CSKA Moscow	6	0	3	3	5	11	−6	3		1–1	1–1	0–1	—

Source: UEFA
Rules for classification: Group stage tiebreakers

14 September 2016 1	Bayer Leverkusen (Germany)	2–2	(Russia) CSKA Moscow	Leverkusen, Germany
20:45 CEST (UTC+2)	Mehmedi 9'; Çalhanoğlu 15'; Wendell (yellow card) 83'; Henrichs (yellow card) 86'	Report	Dzagoev 36'; Eremenko 38'	Stadium: BayArena; Attendance: 23,459; Referee: Daniele Orsato (Italy)

27 September 2016 2	Monaco (France)	1–1	(Germany) Bayer Leverkusen	Fontvieille, Monaco
20:45 CEST (UTC+2)	Jemerson (yellow card) 50'; Glik 90+4'	Report	Tah (yellow card) 19'; Toprak (yellow card) 50'; Hernández 74'	Stadium: Stade Louis II; Attendance: 8,100; Referee: David Fernández Borbalán (Spain)

18 October 2016 3	Bayer Leverkusen (Germany)	0–0	(England) Tottenham Hotspur	Leverkusen, Germany
20:45 CEST (UTC+2)	Çalhanoğlu (yellow card) 21'; Bender (yellow card) 40'	Report	Lamela (yellow card) 25'	Stadium: BayArena; Attendance: 28,887; Referee: Cüneyt Çakır (Turkey)

2 November 2016 4	Tottenham Hotspur (England)	0–1	(Germany) Bayer Leverkusen	London, England
19:45 GMT (UTC); 20:45 CET (UTC+1)		Report	Kampl 65'	Stadium: Wembley Stadium; Attendance: 85,512; Referee: Jonas Eriksson (Sweden)

22 November 2016 5	CSKA Moscow (Russia)	1–1	(Germany) Bayer Leverkusen	Moscow, Russia
20:00 MSK (UTC+3); 18:00 CET (UTC+1)	Akinfeev (yellow card) 37'; Wernbloom (yellow card) 62'; Natcho 76' (pen.)	Report	Volland 16'; Hernández (yellow card) 72'; Henrichs (yellow card) 75'; Kampl (yellow card) 77'	Stadium: Arena CSKA; Attendance: 19,164; Referee: Alberto Undiano Mallenco (Spain)

7 December 2016 6	Bayer Leverkusen (Germany)	3–0	(France) Monaco	Leverkusen, Germany
20:45 CET (UTC+1)	Yurchenko 30'; Brandt 48'; De Sanctis 82' (o.g.); Dragović (yellow card) 88'	Report	Jemerson (yellow card) 24'; Boschilia (yellow card) 41'; Germain (yellow card) 88'	Stadium: BayArena; Attendance: 21,928; Referee: Gediminas Mažeika (Lithuania)

==== Knockout phase ====
===== Round of 16 =====
21 February 2017 First leg	Bayer Leverkusen (Germany)	2–4	(Spain) Atlético Madrid	Leverkusen, Germany
20:45 CET (UTC+1)	Henrichs (yellow card) 15'; Bellarabi 48'; Dragović (yellow card) 58'; Wendell (yellow card) 64'; Savić 68' (o.g.); Aránguiz (yellow card) 74'	Report	Saúl 17'; Griezmann 25'; Gameiro 59' (pen.); Torres 86', (yellow card) 88'; Gabi (yellow card) 89'; Filipe Luís (yellow card) 90'	Stadium: BayArena; Attendance: 29,300; Referee: Willie Collum (Scotland)

15 March 2017 Second leg	Atlético Madrid (Spain)	0–0 (4–2 agg.)	(Germany) Bayer Leverkusen	Madrid, Spain
20:45 CET (UTC+1)	Giménez (yellow card) 66'; Gaitán (yellow card) 89'	Report	Jedvaj (yellow card) 64'; Baumgartlinger (yellow card) 71'	Stadium: Vicente Calderón; Attendance: 49,133; Referee: Sergei Karasev (Russia)

== Statistics ==
=== Appearances and goals ===
No.	Pos	Nat	Player	Total		Bundesliga		DFB-Pokal		Champions League	
No.	Pos	Nat	Player	Apps	Goals	Apps	Goals	Apps	Goals	Apps	Goals
Goalkeepers
1	GK	(Germany) GER	Bernd Leno	41	0	34	0	1	0	6	0
28	GK	(Austria) AUT	Ramazan Özcan	2	0	0	0	1	0	1	0
36	GK	(Germany) GER	Niklas Lomb	0	0	0	0	0	0	0	0
Defenders
4	DF	(Germany) GER	Jonathan Tah	26	1	16+3	1	2	0	5	0
6	DF	(Austria) AUT	Aleksandar Dragović	22	0	15+4	0	1	0	2	0
13	DF	(Germany) GER	Roberto Hilbert	8	0	7	0	1	0	0	0
16	DF	(Croatia) CRO	Tin Jedvaj	22	1	16+2	1	1	0	2+1	0
18	DF	(Brazil) BRA	Wendell	37	2	27+5	2	1	0	4	0
21	DF	(Turkey) TUR	Ömer Toprak	32	1	25	1	1	0	6	0
22	DF	(Germany) GER	Joel Abu Hanna	0	0	0	0	0	0	0	0
23	DF	(Germany) GER	Danny da Costa	4	0	1+2	0	0	0	1	0
Midfielders
8	MF	(Germany) GER	Lars Bender	12	0	9	0	0	0	3	0
10	MF	(Turkey) TUR	Hakan Çalhanoğlu	22	7	14+1	6	0+1	0	5+1	1
15	MF	(Austria) AUT	Julian Baumgartlinger	29	0	19+3	0	1+1	0	2+3	0
19	MF	(Germany) GER	Julian Brandt	40	4	26+7	3	0	0	6+1	1
20	MF	(Chile) CHI	Charles Aránguiz	35	2	22+4	2	1+1	0	5+2	0
29	MF	(Germany) GER	Kai Havertz	28	4	15+9	4	0+1	0	1+2	0
30	MF	(Germany) GER	Sam Schreck	0	0	0	0	0	0	0	0
35	MF	(Ukraine) UKR	Vladlen Yurchenko	4	1	1+2	0	0	0	1	1
38	MF	(Germany) GER	Karim Bellarabi	18	4	14+2	2	1	1	1	1
39	MF	(Germany) GER	Benjamin Henrichs	37	0	27+2	0	1	0	6+1	0
44	MF	(Slovenia) SLO	Kevin Kampl	38	2	28+2	1	2	0	6	1
Forwards
7	FW	(Mexico) MEX	Javier Hernández	35	13	20+6	11	2	1	7	1
9	FW	(Jamaica) JAM	Leon Bailey	9	0	0+8	0	0	0	0+1	0
11	FW	(Germany) GER	Stefan Kießling	24	4	6+14	4	1	0	2+1	0
14	FW	(Switzerland) SUI	Admir Mehmedi	30	4	17+6	3	1+1	0	3+2	1
17	FW	(Finland) FIN	Joel Pohjanpalo	13	6	1+10	6	0	0	0+2	0
31	FW	(Germany) GER	Kevin Volland	30	9	16+7	6	2	2	2+3	1
Players transferred out during the season
27	FW	(Australia) AUS	Robbie Kruse	3	0	0	0	1+1	0	0+1	0
32	DF	(Germany) GER	Lukas Boeder	0	0	0	0	0	0	0	0

Last updated: 20 May 2017
Source: Competitions

=== Goalscorers ===
Rank	No.	Pos	Nat	Name	Bundesliga	DFB-Pokal	UEFA CL	Total
1	7	FW	(Mexico)	Javier Hernández	11	1	1	13
2	31	FW	(Germany)	Kevin Volland	6	2	1	9
3	10	MF	(Turkey)	Hakan Çalhanoğlu	6	0	1	7
4	17	FW	(Finland)	Joel Pohjanpalo	6	0	0	6
5	11	FW	(Germany)	Stefan Kießling	4	0	0	4
5	14	FW	(Switzerland)	Admir Mehmedi	3	0	1	4
5	19	MF	(Germany)	Julian Brandt	3	0	1	4
5	29	MF	(Germany)	Kai Havertz	4	0	0	4
5	38	MF	(Germany)	Karim Bellarabi	2	1	1	4
10	18	DF	(Brazil)	Wendell	2	0	0	2
10	20	MF	(Chile)	Charles Aránguiz	2	0	0	2
10	44	MF	(Slovenia)	Kevin Kampl	1	0	1	2
13	4	DF	(Germany)	Jonathan Tah	1	0	0	1
13	16	DF	(Croatia)	Tin Jedvaj	1	0	0	1
13	21	DF	(Turkey)	Ömer Toprak	1	0	0	1
13	35	MF	(Ukraine)	Vladlen Yurchenko	0	0	1	1
Own goal					0	0	2	2
Totals					53	4	10	67

Last updated: 20 May 2017

=== Clean sheets ===
Rank	No.	Pos	Nat	Name	Bundesliga	DFB-Pokal	UEFA CL	Total
1	1	GK	(Germany)	Bernd Leno	6	0	2	8
2	28	GK	(Austria)	Ramazan Özcan	0	0	1	1
Totals					6	0	3	9

Last updated: 15 April 2017

=== Disciplinary record ===
No.	Pos	Nat	Player	Bundesliga			DFB-Pokal			UEFA CL			Total		
No.	Pos	Nat	Player	Yellow card	(yellow card) (yellow-red card)	Red card	Yellow card	(yellow card) (yellow-red card)	Red card	Yellow card	(yellow card) (yellow-red card)	Red card	Yellow card	(yellow card) (yellow-red card)	Red card
4	DF	(Germany)	Jonathan Tah	1	0	0	0	0	0	1	0	0	2	0	0
6	DF	(Austria)	Aleksandar Dragović	1	0	0	1	0	0	1	0	0	3	0	0
7	FW	(Mexico)	Javier Hernández	1	0	0	2	0	0	2	0	0	5	0	0
8	MF	(Germany)	Lars Bender	4	0	0	0	0	0	1	0	0	5	0	0
9	FW	(Jamaica)	Leon Bailey	1	0	0	0	0	0	0	0	0	1	0	0
10	MF	(Turkey)	Hakan Çalhanoğlu	1	0	0	0	0	0	1	0	0	2	0	0
13	DF	(Germany)	Roberto Hilbert	2	0	0	0	0	0	0	0	0	2	0	0
14	FW	(Switzerland)	Admir Mehmedi	1	0	0	0	0	0	0	0	0	1	0	0
15	MF	(Austria)	Julian Baumgartlinger	1	0	0	0	0	0	0	0	0	1	0	0
16	DF	(Croatia)	Tin Jedvaj	2	1	0	1	0	0	0	0	0	3	1	0
18	DF	(Brazil)	Wendell	8	1	0	1	0	0	2	0	0	11	1	0
20	MF	(Chile)	Charles Aránguiz	8	0	0	1	0	0	1	0	0	10	0	0
21	DF	(Turkey)	Ömer Toprak	5	0	0	0	0	0	1	0	0	6	0	0
29	MF	(Germany)	Kai Havertz	2	0	0	0	0	0	0	0	0	2	0	0
31	FW	(Germany)	Kevin Volland	3	0	1	1	0	0	0	0	0	4	0	1
38	MF	(Germany)	Karim Bellarabi	4	0	0	0	0	0	0	0	0	4	0	0
39	MF	(Germany)	Benjamin Henrichs	1	0	0	0	0	0	3	0	0	4	0	0
44	MF	(Slovenia)	Kevin Kampl	4	0	0	0	0	0	1	0	0	5	0	0
Totals				50	2	1	7	0	0	14	0	0	71	2	1

Last updated: 20 May 2017
