= 2020–21 Bayer 04 Leverkusen season =

Bayer 04 Leverkusen
2020–21 season
- Administration: Fernando Carro (CEO); Rudi Völler (Managing Director Sports)
- Head coach: Peter Bosz (until 23 March); Hannes Wolf (caretaker, from 23 March)
- Stadium: BayArena
- Bundesliga: 6th
- DFB-Pokal: Round of 16
- UEFA Europa League: Round of 32
- Top goalscorer: League: Lucas Alario (11); All: Lucas Alario; Leon Bailey (15 each)
- Highest home attendance: 6,042 vs RB Leipzig
Home colours	Away colours	Third colours

The 2020–21 season was the 117th season in the existence of Bayer 04 Leverkusen and the club's 42nd consecutive season in the top flight of German football. In addition to the domestic league, Bayer 04 Leverkusen also participated in this season's edition of the DFB-Pokal as well as the UEFA Europa League. The season covered the period from 11 August 2020 to 30 June 2021.

== Players ==
=== First-team squad ===
As of 13 January 2021

Note: Flags indicate national team as defined under FIFA eligibility rules; some limited exceptions apply. Players may hold more than one non-FIFA nationality.

No.	Pos.	Nation	Player
1	GK	FIN	Lukas Hradecky
2	DF	COL	Santiago Arias (on loan from Atlético Madrid)
4	DF	GER	Jonathan Tah
5	MF	GER	Sven Bender
6	DF	AUT	Aleksandar Dragović
7	FW	BRA	Paulinho
8	MF	GER	Lars Bender
9	FW	JAM	Leon Bailey
10	MF	GER	Kerem Demirbay
11	MF	GER	Nadiem Amiri
12	DF	BFA	Edmond Tapsoba
13	FW	ARG	Lucas Alario
14	FW	CZE	Patrik Schick
15	MF	AUT	Julian Baumgartlinger
16	DF	CRO	Tin Jedvaj
18	DF	BRA	Wendell

No.	Pos.	Nation	Player
19	FW	FRA	Moussa Diaby
20	MF	CHI	Charles Aránguiz (captain)
21	GK	GER	Lennart Grill
22	DF	NED	Daley Sinkgraven
23	DF	GER	Mitchell Weiser
24	DF	NED	Timothy Fosu-Mensah
25	MF	ARG	Exequiel Palacios
27	MF	GER	Florian Wirtz
28	FW	ENG	Demarai Gray
30	MF	NED	Jeremie Frimpong
32	FW	TUR	Samed Onur
36	GK	GER	Niklas Lomb
37	FW	GER	Emrehan Gedikli
38	MF	GER	Karim Bellarabi
39	MF	TUR	Cem Türkmen

=== Players out on loan ===
Note: Flags indicate national team as defined under FIFA eligibility rules; some limited exceptions apply. Players may hold more than one non-FIFA nationality.

No.	Pos.	Nation	Player
–	MF	MAR	Ayman Azhil (at RKC Waalwijk until 30 June 2021)
—	FW	FIN	Joel Pohjanpalo (at Union Berlin until 30 June 2021)
—	DF	GRE	Panagiotis Retsos (at Saint-Étienne until 30 June 2021)

== Transfers ==
=== In ===
No.	Pos	Player	Transferred from	Fee	Date	Source
14	FW	(Czech Republic) Patrik Schick	(Italy) Roma	€26,500,000	8 September 2020	
2	DF	(Colombia) Santiago Arias	(Spain) Atlético Madrid	Loan	24 September 2020	
24	DF	(Netherlands) Timothy Fosu-Mensah	(England) Manchester United	€1,700,000	13 January 2021	
30	DF	(Netherlands) Jeremie Frimpong	(Scotland) Celtic	€11,000,000	27 January 2021	
28	FW	(England) Demarai Gray	(England) Leicester City	€2,000,000	31 January 2021	

=== Out ===
No.	Pos	Player	Transferred to	Fee	Date	Source
28	GK	(Austria) Ramazan Özcan		Retired	11 August 2020	
30	MF	(Poland) Adrian Stanilewicz	(Germany) SV Darmstadt 98	Free	22 August 2020	
	MF	(Morocco) Ayman Azhil	(Netherlands) RKC Waalwijk	Loan	31 August 2020	
31	FW	(Germany) Kevin Volland	Monaco	€15,500,000	2 September 2020	
29	MF	(Germany) Kai Havertz	(England) Chelsea	€79,600,000	4 September 2020	
17	FW	(Finland) Joel Pohjanpalo	(Germany) Union Berlin	Loan	30 September 2020	
3	DF	(Greece) Panagiotis Retsos	(France) Saint-Étienne	Loan	5 October 2020	

== Pre-season and friendlies ==
Win Draw Loss

4 September 2020 Friendly	Bayer Leverkusen	1–1	Anderlecht	Leverkusen, Germany
14:00 CEST (UTC+2)	Palacios 6'	Report	Dauda 21'	Stadium: BayArena; Attendance: 0

== Competitions ==
=== Overview ===
Competition	First match	Last match	Starting round	Final position	Record							
Competition	First match	Last match	Starting round	Final position	Pld	W	D	L	GF	GA	GD	Win %
Bundesliga	20 September 2020	22 May 2021	Matchday 1	6th	34	14	10	10	53	39	+14	41.18
DFB-Pokal	13 September 2020	2 February 2021	First round	Round of 16	3	2	0	1	12	3	+9	66.67
UEFA Europa League	22 October 2020	25 February 2021	Group stage	Round of 32	8	5	0	3	24	14	+10	62.50
Total					45	21	10	14	89	56	+33	46.67

Source: Soccerway

=== Bundesliga ===
==== League table ====
Pos	Team	Pld	W	D	L	GF	GA	GD	Pts	Qualification or relegation
4	VfL Wolfsburg	34	17	10	7	61	37	+24	61	Qualification for the Champions League group stage
5	Eintracht Frankfurt	34	16	12	6	69	53	+16	60	Qualification for the Europa League group stage (Note: Since the winners of the 2020–21 DFB-Pokal, Borussia Dortmund, qualified for the Champions League based on league position, the Europa League group stage spot was passed to the sixth-placed team, and the Europa Conference League play-off round spot was passed to the seventh-placed team.)
6	Bayer Leverkusen	34	14	10	10	53	39	+14	52	Qualification for the Europa League group stage
7	Union Berlin	34	12	14	8	50	43	+7	50	Qualification for the Europa Conference League play-off round
8	Borussia Mönchengladbach	34	13	10	11	64	56	+8	49	

Source: DFB
Rules for classification: 1) Points; 2) Goal difference; 3) Goals scored; 4) Head-to-head results; 5) Head-to-head away goals scored; 6) Away goals scored; 7) Play-off.

==== Results summary ====
Overall								Home						Away					
Pld	W	D	L	GF	GA	GD	Pts	W	D	L	GF	GA	GD	W	D	L	GF	GA	GD
34	14	10	10	53	39	+14	52	8	5	4	34	22	+12	6	5	6	19	17	+2

Source: DFB

==== Results by round ====
Round	1	2	3	4	5	6	7	8	9	10	11	12	13	14	15	16	17	18	19	20	21	22	23	24	25	26	27	28	29	30	31	32	33	34
Ground	A	H	A	A	H	A	H	A	H	A	H	A	H	A	H	A	H	H	A	H	H	A	H	A	H	A	H	A	H	A	H	A	H	A
Result	D	D	D	W	W	W	W	W	D	W	W	W	L	L	D	L	W	L	L	W	D	D	L	W	L	L	W	D	W	L	W	D	D	L
Position	10	13	14	9	4	4	4	3	3	2	1	1	2	3	3	3	3	3	5	5	5	5	6	5	6	6	6	6	6	6	6	6	6	6

Source: DFB
A = Away; H = Home; W = Win; D = Draw; L = Loss

==== Matches ====
The league fixtures were announced on 7 August 2020.

20 September 2020 1	VfL Wolfsburg	0–0	Bayer Leverkusen	Wolfsburg
18:00 CEST (UTC+2)	Schlager (yellow card) 43'	Report	Aránguiz (yellow card) 33'; Baumgartlinger (yellow card) 90+2'	Stadium: Volkswagen Arena; Attendance: 500; Referee: Sven Jablonski

26 September 2020 2	Bayer Leverkusen	1–1	RB Leipzig	Leverkusen
15:30 CEST (UTC+2)	Demirbay (yellow card) 19', (goal) 20'	Report	Forsberg 14'; Klostermann (yellow card) 45'; Haidara (yellow card) 65'; Adams (yellow card) 90+2'	Stadium: BayArena; Attendance: 6,042; Referee: Harm Osmers

3 October 2020 3	VfB Stuttgart	1–1	Bayer Leverkusen	Stuttgart
15:30 CEST (UTC+2)	Kempf (yellow card) 69'; Massimo (yellow card) 75'; Kalajdžić 76'; Endo (yellow card) 89'	Report	Schick 7'; Bellarabi (yellow card) 75'; Aránguiz (yellow card) 89'	Stadium: Mercedes-Benz Arena; Attendance: 9,500; Referee: Robert Hartmann

17 October 2020 4	Mainz 05	0–1	Bayer Leverkusen	Mainz
15:30 CEST (UTC+2)	Latza (yellow card) 75'; Fernandes (yellow card) 85'; Ji Dong-won (yellow card) 86'	Report	Alario 30'; L. Bender (yellow card) 57'	Stadium: Opel Arena; Attendance: 250; Referee: Bastian Dankert

26 October 2020 5	Bayer Leverkusen	3–1	FC Augsburg	Leverkusen
20:30 CET (UTC+1)	Alario 16' (pen.), 74', (yellow card) 78'; Diaby 90+4'	Report	Framberger (yellow card) 15'; Caligiuri 51'; Vargas (yellow card) 77'	Stadium: BayArena; Attendance: 0 Referee: Sören Storks

1 November 2020 6	SC Freiburg	2–4	Bayer Leverkusen	Freiburg
15:30 CET (UTC+1)	Höler 3'; Kübler (yellow card) 45+1'; Heintz (yellow card) 50'; Petersen 72'	Report	S. Bender (yellow card) 24'; Alario 29', 42'; Diaby (yellow card) 60'; Amiri 64'; Tah 76'	Stadium: Schwarzwald-Stadion; Attendance: 0 Referee: Benjamin Cortus

8 November 2020 7	Bayer Leverkusen	4–3	Borussia Mönchengladbach	Leverkusen
18:00 CET (UTC+1)	Hradecky (yellow card) 18'; Alario 27', 41'; L. Bender (yellow card) 51'; Bailey 68'; Baumgartlinger 82'; Wirtz (yellow card) 84'; Diaby (yellow card) 86'	Report	Stindl 18' (pen.), 30'; Bensebaini (yellow card) 45+4'; Embolo (yellow card) 46'; Lazaro 90+4'	Stadium: BayArena; Attendance: 0 Referee: Harm Osmers

21 November 2020 8	Arminia Bielefeld	1–2	Bayer Leverkusen	Bielefeld
15:30 CET (UTC+1)	Hradecky 47' (o.g.)	Report	Bailey 27'; Dragović (yellow card) 65', (goal) 88'	Stadium: Bielefelder Alm; Attendance: 0 Referee: Felix Brych

29 November 2020 9	Bayer Leverkusen	0–0	Hertha BSC	Leverkusen
15:30 CET (UTC+1)	Sinkgraven (yellow card) 80'; Bailey (yellow card) 90+4'	Report	Cunha (yellow card) 30'	Stadium: BayArena; Attendance: 0 Referee: Daniel Schlager

6 December 2020 10	Schalke 04	0–3	Bayer Leverkusen	Gelsenkirchen
18:00 CET (UTC+1)	Uth (yellow card) 11'; Skrzybski (penalty missed) 71'; Hoppe (yellow card) 72'	Report	Thiaw 10' (o.g.); Dragović (yellow card) 58'; Tah (yellow card) 59'; Baumgartlinger 67'; Sinkgraven (yellow card) 71'; Schick 78'	Stadium: Veltins-Arena; Attendance: 0 Referee: Benjamin Cortus

13 December 2020 11	Bayer Leverkusen	4–1	1899 Hoffenheim	Leverkusen
18:00 CET (UTC+1)	Bailey 4', 27'; Diaby (yellow card) 31'; Sinkgraven (yellow card) 35'; Wirtz 55'; Amiri (yellow card) 74'; Alario 90+1' (pen.)	Report	Grillitsch (yellow card) 38' (yellow-red card) 64'; Baumgartner 50'; Posch (yellow card) 58' (yellow-red card) 79'; Vogt (yellow card) 74'; Nordtveit (yellow card) 90+1'	Stadium: BayArena; Attendance: 0 Referee: Martin Petersen

16 December 2020 12	1. FC Köln	0–4	Bayer Leverkusen	Cologne
20:30 CET (UTC+1)	Horn (yellow card) 34'	Report	Weiser 8'; Diaby 10'; Dragović (yellow card) 54'; Schick 54'; Wirtz 59'	Stadium: RheinEnergieStadion; Attendance: 0 Referee: Tobias Stieler

19 December 2020 13	Bayer Leverkusen	1–2	Bayern Munich	Leverkusen
18:30 CET (UTC+1)	Schick 14'; Bailey (yellow card) 72'	Report	Gnabry (yellow card) 24'; Lewandowski 43', 90+3'	Stadium: BayArena; Attendance: 0 Referee: Felix Zwayer

2 January 2021 14	Eintracht Frankfurt	2–1	Bayer Leverkusen	Frankfurt
15:30 CET (UTC+1)	Younes 22'; Tapsoba 54' (o.g.)	Report	Amiri 10'	Stadium: Deutsche Bank Park; Attendance: 0 Referee: Felix Brych

9 January 2021 15	Bayer Leverkusen	1–1	Werder Bremen	Leverkusen
15:30 CET (UTC+1)	Schick (yellow card) 67', (goal) 70'; Demirbay (yellow card) 89'	Report	Toprak 52'; Augustinsson (yellow card) 55'; Mbom (yellow card) 88'	Stadium: BayArena; Attendance: 0 Referee: Benjamin Cortus

15 January 2021 16	Union Berlin	1–0	Bayer Leverkusen	Berlin
20:30 CET (UTC+1)	Friedrich (yellow card) 52'; Teuchert 88'	Report	Tah (yellow card) 43'; Amiri (yellow card) 90+1'	Stadium: Stadion An der Alten Försterei; Attendance: 0 Referee: Florian Badstübner

19 January 2021 17	Bayer Leverkusen	2–1	Borussia Dortmund	Leverkusen
20:30 CET (UTC+1)	Diaby 14', (yellow card) 78'; Bailey (yellow card) 73'; Wirtz 80'	Report	Brandt 67'; Hummels (yellow card) 90+1'; Delaney (yellow card) 90+3'	Stadium: BayArena; Attendance: 0 Referee: Felix Zwayer

23 January 2021 18	Bayer Leverkusen	0–1	VfL Wolfsburg	Leverkusen
15:30 CET (UTC+1)	Alario (yellow card) 90+2'	Report	Baku 35'; Lacroix (yellow card) 90+3'	Stadium: BayArena; Attendance: 0 Referee: Marco Fritz

30 January 2021 19	RB Leipzig	1–0	Bayer Leverkusen	Leipzig
18:30 CET (UTC+1)	Nkunku 51'; Kluivert (yellow card) 90'; Haidara (yellow card) 90+2'	Report	Bellarabi (yellow card) 60'; Bailey (yellow card) 75'	Stadium: Red Bull Arena; Attendance: 0 Referee: Harm Osmers

6 February 2021 20	Bayer Leverkusen	5–2	VfB Stuttgart	Leverkusen
15:30 CET (UTC+1)	Demirbay 18', 31'; Bailey 56'; Wirtz 68'; Gray 84'	Report	Kalajdžić 50', 77'	Stadium: BayArena; Attendance: 0 Referee: Sven Jablonski

13 February 2021 21	Bayer Leverkusen	2–2	Mainz 05	Leverkusen
15:30 CET (UTC+1)	Tah (yellow card) 3'; Wendell (yellow card) 13'; Alario 14'; Tapsoba (yellow card) 67'; Schick (yellow card) 68', (goal) 84'; Fosu-Mensah (yellow card) 82'	Report	Glatzel 89'; Stöger 90+2', (yellow card) 90+4'	Stadium: BayArena; Attendance: 0 Referee: Guido Winkmann

21 February 2021 22	FC Augsburg	1–1	Bayer Leverkusen	Augsburg
13:30 CET (UTC+1)	Niederlechner 5', (yellow card) 59'; Bénes (yellow card) 49'	Report	Tapsoba (yellow card) 32', (goal) 90+5'; Aránguiz (yellow card) 39'; Diaby (yellow card) 88'; Fosu-Mensah (yellow card) 89'	Stadium: WWK Arena; Attendance: 0 Referee: Christian Dingert

28 February 2021 23	Bayer Leverkusen	1–2	SC Freiburg	Leverkusen
18:00 CET (UTC+1)	Aránguiz (yellow card) 68'; Bailey 70', (yellow card) 71'	Report	Demirović (yellow card) 21', (goal) 50'; Höler 61'; Höfler (yellow card) 73'; Sallai (yellow card) 77'	Stadium: BayArena; Attendance: 0 Referee: Felix Zwayer

6 March 2021 24	Borussia Mönchengladbach	0–1	Bayer Leverkusen	Mönchengladbach
15:30 CET (UTC+1)		Report	Amiri (yellow card) 38'; Schick 76', (yellow card) 90+3'	Stadium: Borussia-Park; Attendance: 0 Referee: Daniel Siebert

14 March 2021 25	Bayer Leverkusen	1–2	Arminia Bielefeld	Leverkusen
13:30 CET (UTC+1)	Frimpong (yellow card) 49'; Schick 85'; Wendell (yellow card) 90+6'	Report	Pieper (yellow card) 16'; Dōan 18'; Okugawa 57'	Stadium: BayArena; Attendance: 0 Referee: Sascha Stegemann

21 March 2021 26	Hertha BSC	3–0	Bayer Leverkusen	Berlin
15:30 CET (UTC+1)	Zeefuik 4'; Cunha 26'; Córdoba 33'	Report	Bailey (yellow card) 35'; Amiri (yellow card) 79'	Stadium: Olympiastadion; Attendance: 0 Referee: Felix Brych

3 April 2021 27	Bayer Leverkusen	2–1	Schalke 04	Leverkusen
15:30 CEST (UTC+2)	Alario 26'; Schick 72'; Tapsoba (yellow card) 73'	Report	Huntelaar 81'	Stadium: BayArena; Attendance: 0 Referee: Sven Jablonski

12 April 2021 28	1899 Hoffenheim	0–0	Bayer Leverkusen	Sinsheim
20:30 CEST (UTC+2)	Baumgartner (yellow card) 89'	Report	Wendell (yellow card) 81'	Stadium: Rhein-Neckar-Arena; Attendance: 0 Referee: Matthias Jöllenbeck

17 April 2021 29	Bayer Leverkusen	3–0	1. FC Köln	Leverkusen
18:30 CEST (UTC+2)	Bailey 5', 76'; Tapsoba (yellow card) 40'; Diaby 51'	Report	Czichos (yellow card) 90'	Stadium: BayArena; Attendance: 0 Referee: Sören Storks

20 April 2021 30	Bayern Munich	2–0	Bayer Leverkusen	Munich
20:30 CEST (UTC+2)	Choupo-Moting 7'; Kimmich 13'	Report		Stadium: Allianz Arena; Attendance: 0 Referee: Guido Winkmann

24 April 2021 31	Bayer Leverkusen	3–1	Eintracht Frankfurt	Leverkusen
18:30 CEST (UTC+2)	Bailey 70'; Palacios (yellow card) 76'; Alario 80'; Demirbay 90+1'	Report	Ndicka (yellow card) 87'; Silva 90+1'	Stadium: BayArena; Attendance: 0 Referee: Felix Zwayer

8 May 2021 32	Werder Bremen	0–0	Bayer Leverkusen	Bremen
15:30 CEST (UTC+2)	Sargent (yellow card) 4'; Groß (yellow card) 42'; Gebre Selassie (yellow card) 87'; Dinkçi (red card) 90+4'	Report	Sinkgraven (yellow card) 27'; Schick (yellow card) 90+1'	Stadium: Weser-Stadion; Attendance: 0 Referee: Markus Schmidt

15 May 2021 33	Bayer Leverkusen	1–1	Union Berlin	Leverkusen
15:30 CEST (UTC+2)	Amiri (yellow card) 6'; Tapsoba (yellow card) 17'; Wirtz 27'	Report	Ingvartsen (yellow card) 40'; Andrich (yellow card) 55'; Pohjanpalo 72'	Stadium: BayArena; Attendance: 0 Referee: Patrick Ittrich

22 May 2021 34	Borussia Dortmund	3–1	Bayer Leverkusen	Dortmund
15:30 CEST (UTC+2)	Haaland 5', 84'; Reus 51'	Report	Bender 90' (pen.)	Stadium: Signal Iduna Park; Attendance: 0 Referee: Manuel Gräfe

=== DFB-Pokal ===
13 September 2020 First round	Eintracht Norderstedt	0–7	Bayer Leverkusen	Leverkusen
15:30 CEST (UTC+2)	Brown (yellow card) 79'	Report	L. Bender 4'; Amiri 10', 31'; Alario 12'; Wirtz 21'; Aránguiz 30'; Schick 77'	Stadium: BayArena; Attendance: 300; Referee: Sören Storks

12 January 2021 (Note: The Bayer Leverkusen v Eintracht Frankfurt match was rescheduled to 12 January 2021 following a request by Bayer Leverkusen, as they had a heavy schedule in December.) Second round	Bayer Leverkusen	4–1	Eintracht Frankfurt	Leverkusen
20:45 CET (UTC+1)	Alario 27' (pen.); Tapsoba 49', (yellow card) 61'; Diaby 67', 87'; Tah (red card) 73'; L. Bender (yellow card) 83'	Report	Younes 6'; Hinteregger (yellow card) 42'	Stadium: BayArena; Attendance: 0 Referee: Christian Dingert

2 February 2021 Round of 16	Rot-Weiss Essen	2–1 (a.e.t.)	Bayer Leverkusen	Essen
18:30 CET (UTC+1)	Kefkir 108'; Engelmann 117', (yellow card) 120'	Report	Palacios (yellow card) 13'; Bailey (yellow card) 81', (goal) 105'	Stadium: Stadion Essen; Attendance: 0 Referee: Daniel Schlager

=== UEFA Europa League ===
==== Group stage ====
The group stage draw was held on 2 October 2020.

Pos	Team	Pld	W	D	L	GF	GA	GD	Pts	Qualification	LEV	SLP	HBS	NCE
1	(Germany) Bayer Leverkusen	6	5	0	1	21	8	+13	15	Advance to knockout phase	—	4–0	4–1	6–2
2	(Czech Republic) Slavia Prague	6	4	0	2	11	10	+1	12	Advance to knockout phase	1–0	—	3–0	3–2
3	(Israel) Hapoel Be'er Sheva	6	2	0	4	7	13	−6	6		2–4	3–1	—	1–0
4	(France) Nice	6	1	0	5	8	16	−8	3		2–3	1–3	1–0	—

Source: UEFA
Rules for classification: Group stage tiebreakers

22 October 2020 1	Bayer Leverkusen (Germany)	6–2	(France) Nice	Leverkusen, Germany
18:55 CEST (UTC+2)	Amiri 11'; Alario 16'; Baumgartlinger (yellow card) 40'; L. Bender (yellow card) 45'; Wendell (yellow card) 57'; Diaby 61'; Bellarabi 79', 83'; Wirtz 87'	Report	Gouiri 31', (yellow card) 32'; Nsoki (yellow card) 50'; Claude-Maurice 90'	Stadium: BayArena; Attendance: 0 (Note: Due to the COVID-19 pandemic in Europe, the match was played behind closed doors.); Referee: Fran Jović (Croatia)

29 October 2020 2	Slavia Prague (Czech Republic)	1–0	(Germany) Bayer Leverkusen	Prague, Czech Republic
21:00 CET (UTC+1)	Provod (yellow card) 59'; Olayinka (yellow card) 68', (goal) 80'; Musa (yellow card) 71'; Ševčík (yellow card) 76'; Kolář (yellow card) 90'	Report	Bellarabi (red card) 22'	Stadium: Sinobo Stadium; Attendance: 0 Referee: Willie Collum (Scotland)

5 November 2020 3	Hapoel Be'er Sheva (Israel)	2–4	(Germany) Bayer Leverkusen	Petah Tikva, Israel
18:55 CET (UTC+1)	Acolatse 11', 25'; Sallallich (yellow card) 13'	Report	Bailey 5', 75'; Alario (yellow card) 21'; Dadia 39' (o.g.); Demirbay (yellow card) 57'; Wirtz 88'	Stadium: HaMoshava Stadium; Attendance: 0 Referee: Radu Petrescu (Romania)

26 November 2020 4	Bayer Leverkusen (Germany)	4–1	(Israel) Hapoel Be'er Sheva	Leverkusen, Germany
21:00 CET (UTC+1)	Schick 29'; Bailey 48'; Demirbay 76'; Alario 80'	Report	Shviro 58', (yellow card) 61'; Taha (yellow card) 71'	Stadium: BayArena; Attendance: 0 Referee: Paweł Gil (Poland)

3 December 2020 5	Nice (France)	2–3	(Germany) Bayer Leverkusen	Nice, France
21:00 CET (UTC+1)	Kamara 26'; Ndoye (yellow card) 39', (goal) 47'; Daniliuc (yellow card) 90+3'	Report	Demirbay (yellow card) 12'; Diaby 22'; Dragović 32'; Baumgartlinger 51'	Stadium: Allianz Riviera; Attendance: 0 Referee: Maurizio Mariani (Italy)

10 December 2020 6	Bayer Leverkusen (Germany)	4–0	(Czech Republic) Slavia Prague	Leverkusen, Germany
18:55 CET (UTC+1)	Bailey 8', 32'; Schick (yellow card) 39'; Diaby 59'; Onur (yellow card) 85'; Bellarabi 90+1'	Report		Stadium: BayArena; Attendance: 0 Referee: Anastasios Sidiropoulos (Greece)

==== Knockout phase ====
===== Round of 32 =====
The draw for the round of 32 was held on 14 December 2020.

18 February 2021 First leg	Young Boys (Switzerland)	4–3	(Germany) Bayer Leverkusen	Bern, Switzerland
18:55 CET (UTC+1)	Fassnacht 3'; Siebatcheu 19', 89'; Elia 44'; Lefort (yellow card) 56'	Report	Schick 49', 52'; Diaby 68'; Sinkgraven (yellow card) 86'	Stadium: Stadion Wankdorf; Attendance: 0 Referee: Antonio Mateu Lahoz (Spain)

25 February 2021 Second leg	Bayer Leverkusen (Germany)	0–2 (3–6 agg.)	(Switzerland) Young Boys	Leverkusen, Germany
21:00 CET (UTC+1)	Sinkgraven (yellow card) 53'	Report	Siebatcheu 48'; Fassnacht 86'	Stadium: BayArena; Attendance: 0 Referee: Davide Massa (Italy)

== Statistics ==
=== Appearances and goals ===
No.	Pos	Nat	Player	Total		Bundesliga		DFB-Pokal		Europa League	
No.	Pos	Nat	Player	Apps	Goals	Apps	Goals	Apps	Goals	Apps	Goals
Goalkeepers
1	GK	(Finland) FIN	Lukas Hradecky	37	0	29	0	3	0	5	0
21	GK	(Germany) GER	Lennart Grill	4	0	4	0	0	0	0	0
36	GK	(Germany) GER	Niklas Lomb	5	0	1+1	0	0	0	3	0
Defenders
2	DF	(Colombia) COL	Santiago Arias	1	0	1	0	0	0	0	0
4	DF	(Germany) GER	Jonathan Tah	35	1	24+3	1	1	0	6+1	0
6	DF	(Austria) AUT	Aleksandar Dragović	29	2	11+7	1	1+2	0	7+1	1
12	DF	(Burkina Faso) BFA	Edmond Tapsoba	39	2	29+2	1	3	1	3+2	0
16	DF	(Croatia) CRO	Tin Jedvaj	8	0	2+1	0	0+1	0	4	0
18	DF	(Brazil) BRA	Wendell	30	0	15+7	0	1+1	0	6	0
22	DF	(Netherlands) NED	Daley Sinkgraven	27	0	19+3	0	1	0	2+2	0
23	DF	(Germany) GER	Mitchell Weiser	5	1	2+3	1	0	0	0	0
24	DF	(Netherlands) NED	Timothy Fosu-Mensah	7	0	5+1	0	1	0	0	0
30	DF	(Netherlands) NED	Jeremie Frimpong	13	0	4+6	0	0+1	0	2	0
Midfielders
5	MF	(Germany) GER	Sven Bender	20	0	14+4	0	1	0	1	0
8	MF	(Germany) GER	Lars Bender	20	2	12+2	1	2	1	2+2	0
10	MF	(Germany) GER	Kerem Demirbay	37	5	20+9	4	3	0	5	1
11	MF	(Germany) GER	Nadiem Amiri	39	5	20+9	2	2	2	6+2	1
15	MF	(Austria) AUT	Julian Baumgartlinger	24	3	12+5	2	1+1	0	4+1	1
20	MF	(Chile) CHI	Charles Aránguiz	25	1	20+1	0	2+1	1	1	0
25	MF	(Argentina) ARG	Exequiel Palacios	13	0	7+2	0	1+1	0	2	0
27	MF	(Germany) GER	Florian Wirtz	38	8	25+4	5	1+1	1	5+2	2
38	MF	(Germany) GER	Karim Bellarabi	29	3	7+15	0	2	0	4+1	3
39	MF	(Turkey) TUR	Cem Türkmen	2	0	0	0	0	0	0+2	0
Forwards
7	FW	(Brazil) BRA	Paulinho	1	0	1	0	0	0	0	0
9	FW	(Jamaica) JAM	Leon Bailey	40	15	25+5	9	2	1	6+2	5
13	FW	(Argentina) ARG	Lucas Alario	33	15	12+13	11	3	2	4+1	2
14	FW	(Czech Republic) CZE	Patrik Schick	36	13	20+9	9	1+1	1	5	3
19	FW	(France) FRA	Moussa Diaby	43	10	28+4	4	1+2	2	4+4	4
28	FW	(England) ENG	Demarai Gray	12	1	5+5	1	0	0	1+1	0
32	FW	(Turkey) TUR	Samed Onur	1	0	0	0	0	0	0+1	0
37	FW	(Germany) GER	Emrehan Gedikli	4	0	0+1	0	0	0	0+3	0
Players transferred out during the season
3	DF	(Greece) GRE	Panagiotis Retsos	0	0	0	0	0	0	0	0
17	FW	(Finland) FIN	Joel Pohjanpalo	1	0	0+1	0	0	0	0	0

Last updated: 22 May 2021
Source: Competitions

=== Goalscorers ===
Rank	Pos	No.	Nat	Name	Bundesliga	DFB-Pokal	UEFA EL	Total
1	FW	9	(Jamaica)	Leon Bailey	9	1	5	15
1	FW	13	(Argentina)	Lucas Alario	11	2	2	15
3	FW	14	(Czech Republic)	Patrik Schick	9	1	3	13
4	FW	19	(France)	Moussa Diaby	4	2	4	10
5	MF	27	(Germany)	Florian Wirtz	5	1	2	8
6	MF	10	(Germany)	Kerem Demirbay	4	0	1	5
6	MF	11	(Germany)	Nadiem Amiri	2	2	1	5
8	MF	15	(Austria)	Julian Baumgartlinger	2	0	1	3
8	MF	38	(Germany)	Karim Bellarabi	0	0	3	3
10	DF	6	(Austria)	Aleksandar Dragović	1	0	1	2
10	MF	8	(Germany)	Lars Bender	1	1	0	2
10	DF	12	(Burkina Faso)	Edmond Tapsoba	1	1	0	2
13	DF	4	(Germany)	Jonathan Tah	1	0	0	1
13	MF	20	(Chile)	Charles Aránguiz	0	1	0	1
13	DF	23	(Germany)	Mitchell Weiser	1	0	0	1
13	FW	28	(England)	Demarai Gray	1	0	0	1
Own goals					1	0	1	2
Totals					53	12	24	89

Last updated: 22 May 2021
