= Diarte =

Diarte is a surname. Notable people with the surname include:

- Carlos Diarte (1954–2011), Paraguayan football player and coach
- Lucas Diarte (born 1993), Argentine football player
