= Niklas Lomb =

German footballer (born 1993)

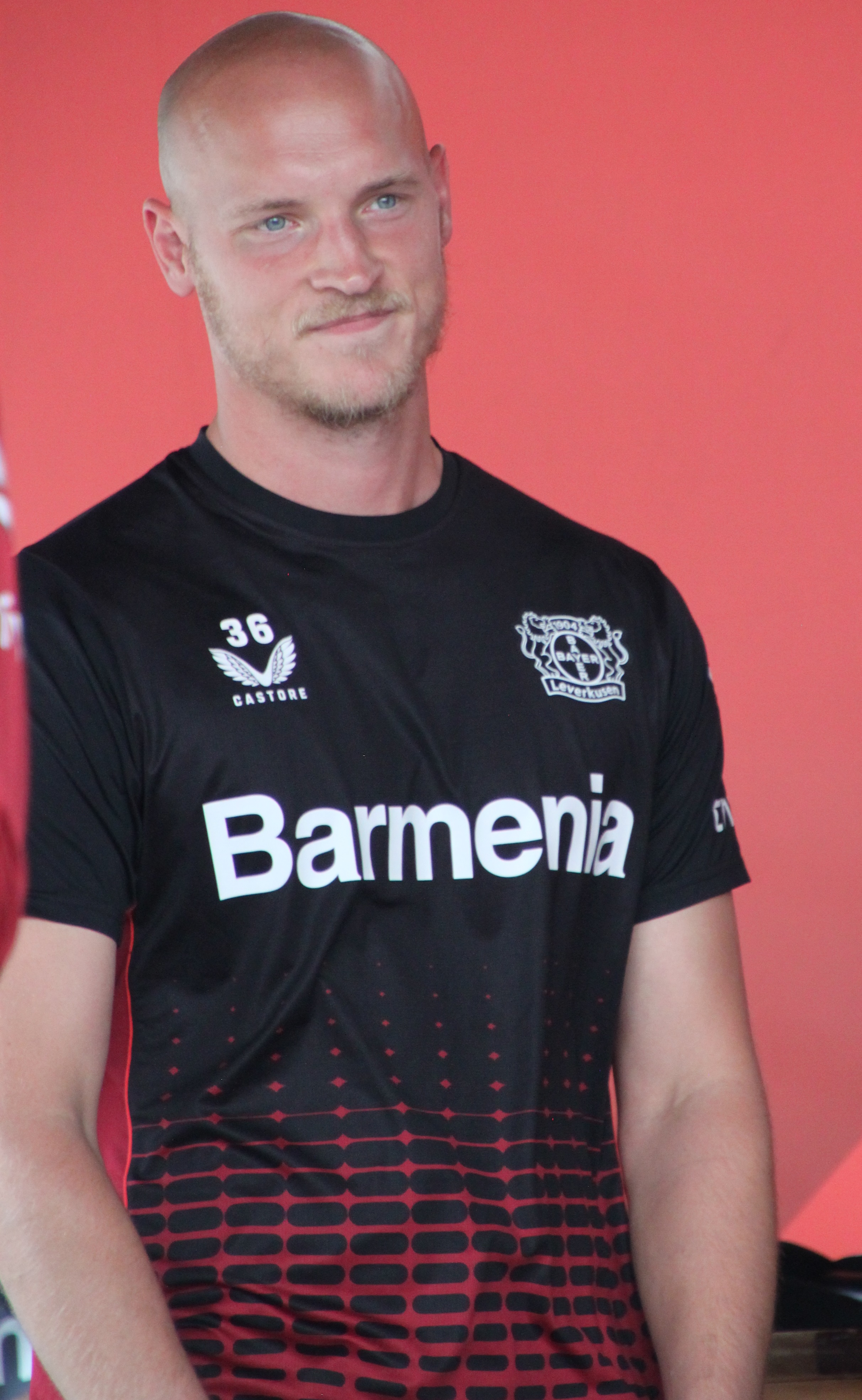
- Lomb with Bayer Leverkusen in 2022

Personal information
- Full name: Niklas Uwe Bernd Lomb
- Date of birth: 28 July 1993 (age 33)
- Place of birth: Cologne, Germany
- Height: 1.86 m (6 ft 1 in)
- Position: Goalkeeper

Team information
- Current team: Bayer Leverkusen
- Number: 36

Youth career
- SC West Köln
- 2008–2012: Bayer Leverkusen

Senior career*
Years	Team	Apps	(Gls)
2012–2014	Bayer Leverkusen II	62	(0)
2012–	Bayer Leverkusen	2	(1)
2015	→ Hallescher FC (loan)	13	(0)
2015–2016	→ Preußen Münster (loan)	37	(0)
2018–2019	→ SV Sandhausen (loan)	12	(0)
- * Club domestic league appearances and goals as of 1 July 2022

Niklas Uwe Bernd Lomb (born 28 July 1993) is a German professional footballer who plays as a goalkeeper for Bundesliga club Bayer Leverkusen.

== Career ==
During the first half of the 2014–15 Bundesliga, Lomb was the third goalkeeper for Bayer Leverkusen, being left out of the squad in all official matches. Subsequently he was loaned to 3. Liga side Hallescher FC for the remainder of the season. He was part of the team that defeated VfL Halle 1896 6–0 to win the 2015 Saxony-Anhalt Cup.

Lomb then made two appearances during the 2020–21 Bundesliga and four total appearances during the 2020–21 and 2023–24 UEFA Europa League for Bayer Leverkusen, although he was not credited with winning the 2023–24 Bundesliga with Bayer Leverkusen due to making no appearances for the club during the Bundesliga season.

== Career statistics ==
As of match played 14 December 2023

Appearances and goals by club, season and competition
Club	Season	League			National cup		Europe		Other		Total	
Club	Season	Division	Apps	Goals	Apps	Goals	Apps	Goals	Apps	Goals	Apps	Goals
Bayer Leverkusen II	2010–11	Regionalliga West	0	0	—		—		—		0	0
Bayer Leverkusen II	2012–13	Regionalliga West	34	0	—		—		—		34	0
Bayer Leverkusen II	2013–14	Regionalliga West	28	0	—		—		—		28	0
Bayer Leverkusen II	Total		62	0	—		—		—		62	0
Bayer Leverkusen	2012–13	Bundesliga	0	0	0	0	1	0	—		1	0
Bayer Leverkusen	2013–14	Bundesliga	0	0	0	0	0	0	—		0	0
Bayer Leverkusen	2014–15	Bundesliga	0	0	0	0	—		—		0	0
Bayer Leverkusen	2016–17	Bundesliga	0	0	0	0	0	0	—		0	0
Bayer Leverkusen	2017–18	Bundesliga	0	0	0	0	—		—		0	0
Bayer Leverkusen	2019–20	Bundesliga	0	0	0	0	0	0	—		0	0
Bayer Leverkusen	2020–21	Bundesliga	2	1	0	0	3	0	—		5	0
Bayer Leverkusen	2021–22	Bundesliga	0	0	0	0	0	0	—		0	0
Bayer Leverkusen	2022–23	Bundesliga	0	0	0	0	0	0	—		0	0
Bayer Leverkusen	2023–24	Bundesliga	0	0	0	0	1	0	—		1	0
Bayer Leverkusen	2024–25	Bundesliga	0	0	0	0	0	0	0	0	0	0
Bayer Leverkusen	2025–26	Bundesliga	0	0	0	0	0	0	—		0	0
Bayer Leverkusen	Total		2	0	0	0	5	0	—		7	0
Hallescher FC (loan)	2014–15	3. Liga	13	0	—		—		—		13	0
Preußen Münster (loan)	2015–16	3. Liga	37	0	—		—		—		37	0
SV Sandhausen (loan)	2018–19	2. Bundesliga	12	0	2	0	—		—		14	0
Career total			126	0	2	0	5	0	0	0	133	0

== Honours ==
Hallescher

- Saxony-Anhalt Cup
  - Champions (1): 2015

Bayer Leverkusen

- UEFA Europa League
  - Runners-up (1): 2023–24
