= 2017–18 Bayer 04 Leverkusen season =

Bayer Leverkusen
2017–18 season
- Sporting Director: Bayer AG
- Managing director: Michael Schade
- Manager: Heiko Herrlich
- Stadium: BayArena
- Bundesliga: 5th
- DFB-Pokal: Semi-finals
- Top goalscorer: League: Kevin Volland (14 goals); All: Kevin Volland (14 goals)
- Biggest win: Leverkusen 4–0 Freiburg; Gladbach 1–5 Leverkusen
- Biggest defeat: Leverkusen 2–6 Bayern; Dortmund 4–0 Leverkusen
Home colours	Away colours	Third colours

The 2017–18 Bayer 04 Leverkusen season was the 114th season in the football club's history and 39th consecutive and overall season in the top flight of German football, the Bundesliga, having been promoted from the 2. Bundesliga Nord in 1979. In addition to the domestic league, Bayer Leverkusen also participated in this season's edition of the domestic cup, the DFB-Pokal. This was the 60th season for Leverkusen in the BayArena, located in Leverkusen, North Rhine-Westphalia, Germany. The season covers a period from 1 July 2017 to 30 June 2018.

== Kits ==
Home	Away	Third	Fourth

== Players ==
=== Squad information ===
As of 31 January 2018

Note: Flags indicate national team as defined under FIFA eligibility rules; some limited exceptions apply. Players may hold more than one non-FIFA nationality.

No.	Pos.	Nation	Player
1	GK	GER	Bernd Leno (vice captain)
3	DF	GRE	Panagiotis Retsos
4	DF	GER	Jonathan Tah
5	DF	GER	Sven Bender
8	MF	GER	Lars Bender (captain)
9	FW	JAM	Leon Bailey
10	FW	GER	Julian Brandt
11	FW	GER	Stefan Kießling
13	FW	ARG	Lucas Alario
15	MF	AUT	Julian Baumgartlinger
16	DF	CRO	Tin Jedvaj
17	FW	FIN	Joel Pohjanpalo

No.	Pos.	Nation	Player
18	DF	BRA	Wendell
20	MF	CHI	Charles Aránguiz
21	MF	GER	Dominik Kohr
22	MF	UKR	Vladlen Yurchenko
28	GK	AUT	Ramazan Özcan
29	MF	GER	Kai Havertz
30	MF	GER	Sam Schreck
31	FW	GER	Kevin Volland
36	GK	GER	Niklas Lomb
37	MF	GER	Marlon Frey
38	MF	GER	Karim Bellarabi
39	DF	GER	Benjamin Henrichs

== Competitions ==
Win Draw Loss

=== Overview ===
Competition	First match	Last match	Starting round	Final position	Record							
Competition	First match	Last match	Starting round	Final position	Pld	W	D	L	GF	GA	GD	Win %
Bundesliga	18 August 2017	12 May 2018	Matchday 1		34	15	10	9	58	44	+14	44.12
DFB-Pokal	11 August 2017	17 April 2018	First round	Semi-finals	5	4	0	1	14	9	+5	80.00
Total					39	19	10	10	72	53	+19	48.72

Last updated: 21 May 2018
Source: Competitions

=== Bundesliga ===
==== League table ====
Pos	Team	Pld	W	D	L	GF	GA	GD	Pts	Qualification or relegation
3	1899 Hoffenheim	34	15	10	9	66	48	+18	55	Qualification for the Champions League group stage
4	Borussia Dortmund	34	15	10	9	64	47	+17	55	Qualification for the Champions League group stage
5	Bayer Leverkusen	34	15	10	9	58	44	+14	55	Qualification for the Europa League group stage
6	RB Leipzig	34	15	8	11	57	53	+4	53	Qualification for the Europa League second qualifying round
7	VfB Stuttgart	34	15	6	13	36	36	0	51	

Source: DFB
Rules for classification: 1) Points; 2) Goal difference; 3) Goals scored; 4) Head-to-head results; 5) Head-to-head away goals scored; 6) Away goals scored; 7) Play-off.

==== Results summary ====
Overall								Home						Away					
Pld	W	D	L	GF	GA	GD	Pts	W	D	L	GF	GA	GD	W	D	L	GF	GA	GD
34	15	10	9	58	44	+14	55	8	5	4	29	19	+10	7	5	5	29	25	+4

Last updated: 21 May 2018.
Source: Bundesliga

==== Results by round ====
Round	1	2	3	4	5	6	7	8	9	10	11	12	13	14	15	16	17	18	19	20	21	22	23	24	25	26	27	28	29	30	31	32	33	34
Ground	A	H	A	H	A	H	A	H	A	H	A	H	A	H	A	H	A	H	A	H	A	H	A	H	A	H	A	H	A	H	A	H	A	H
Result	L	D	L	W	L	W	D	D	W	W	D	D	W	D	W	W	D	L	W	W	D	L	W	L	W	W	L	D	W	W	L	L	D	W
Position	15	14	17	12	14	10	11	12	9	8	9	9	6	9	5	4	4	5	2	2	2	5	4	5	5	4	5	5	4	3	4	5	5	5

Updated to match(es) played on 21 May 2018. Source: Bundesliga
A = Away; H = Home; W = Win; D = Draw; L = Loss

==== Matches ====
18 August 2017 1	Bayern Munich	3–1	Bayer Leverkusen	Munich
20:30 CEST (UTC+2)	Süle 9'; Tolisso 18'; Lewandowski 53' (pen.)	Report	Mehmedi 65'	Stadium: Allianz Arena; Attendance: 75,000; Referee: Tobias Stieler

26 August 2017 2	Bayer Leverkusen	2–2	1899 Hoffenheim	Leverkusen
15:30 CEST (UTC+2)	Wendell 32' (pen.); Bellarabi 49'	Report	Kramarić 47'; Uth 70'	Stadium: BayArena; Attendance: 27,106; Referee: Harm Osmers

9 September 2017 3	Mainz 05	3–1	Bayer Leverkusen	Mainz
15:30 CEST (UTC+2)	Mutō 45'; Diallo 57'; Serdar 71'	Report	Kohr 22'	Stadium: Opel Arena; Attendance: 24,876; Referee: Markus Schmidt

17 September 2017 4	Bayer Leverkusen	4–0	SC Freiburg	Leverkusen
15:30 CEST (UTC+2)	Volland 21', 34'; Aránguiz 29'; Brandt 86'	Report		Stadium: BayArena; Attendance: 26,232; Referee: Sven Jablonski

20 September 2017 5	Hertha BSC	2–1	Bayer Leverkusen	Berlin
20:30 CEST (UTC+2)	Leckie 16'; Kalou 24'	Report	Brandt 84'	Stadium: Olympiastadion Berlin; Attendance: 32,825; Referee: Deniz Aytekin

24 September 2017 6	Bayer Leverkusen	3–0	Hamburger SV	Leverkusen
18:00 CEST (UTC+2)	Volland 20', 83'; Alario 23'	Report		Stadium: BayArena; Attendance: 27,601; Referee: Robert Kampka

29 September 2017 7	Schalke 04	1–1	Bayer Leverkusen	Gelsenkirchen
20:30 CEST (UTC+2)	Goretzka 34'	Report	Bailey 61'	Stadium: Veltins-Arena; Attendance: 61,515; Referee: Guido Winkmann

15 October 2017 8	Bayer Leverkusen	2–2	VfL Wolfsburg	Leverkusen
15:30 CEST (UTC+2)	L. Bender 29'; Alario 61'	Report	Origi 44'; Błaszczykowski 69'	Stadium: BayArena; Attendance: 29,104; Referee: Patrick Ittrich

21 October 2017 9	Borussia Mönchengladbach	1–5	Bayer Leverkusen	Mönchengladbach
15:30 CEST (UTC+2)	Johnson 7'	Report	S. Bender 48'; Bailey 59'; Brandt 61'; Volland 69'; Pohjanpalo 81'	Stadium: Borussia-Park; Attendance: 53,053; Referee: Bastian Dankert

28 October 2017 10	Bayer Leverkusen	2–1	1. FC Köln	Leverkusen
15:30 CEST (UTC+2)	Bailey 54'; S. Bender 73'	Report	Guirassy 23'	Stadium: BayArena; Attendance: 30,210; Referee: Manuel Gräfe

4 November 2017 11	FC Augsburg	1–1	Bayer Leverkusen	Augsburg
15:30 CET (UTC+1)	Danso 49'	Report	Volland 47'	Stadium: WWK Arena; Attendance: 26,133; Referee: Christian Dingert

18 November 2017 12	Bayer Leverkusen	2–2	RB Leipzig	Leverkusen
15:30 CET (UTC+1)	Bailey 44'; Volland 74'	Report	Werner 13' (pen.); Forsberg 54' (pen.)	Stadium: BayArena; Attendance: 29,218; Referee: Harm Osmers

25 November 2017 13	Eintracht Frankfurt	0–1	Bayer Leverkusen	Frankfurt
15:30 CET (UTC+1)		Report	Volland 76'	Stadium: Commerzbank-Arena; Attendance: 50,000; Referee: Patrick Ittrich

2 December 2017 14	Bayer Leverkusen	1–1	Borussia Dortmund	Leverkusen
15:30 CET (UTC+1)	Volland 30'	Report	Yarmolenko 73'	Stadium: BayArena; Attendance: 30,210; Referee: Robert Hartmann

8 December 2017 15	VfB Stuttgart	0–2	Bayer Leverkusen	Stuttgart
20:30 CET (UTC+1)		Report	Havertz 20'; L. Bender 80'	Stadium: Mercedes-Benz Arena; Attendance: 54,650; Referee: Deniz Aytekin

13 December 2017 16	Bayer Leverkusen	1–0	Werder Bremen	Leverkusen
20:30 CET (UTC+1)	Alario 11'	Report		Stadium: BayArena; Attendance: 26,620; Referee: Tobias Stieler

17 December 2017 17	Hannover 96	4–4	Bayer Leverkusen	Hanover
15:30 CET (UTC+1)	Bebou 12'; Füllkrug 21' (pen.); Klaus 45'; Korb 83'	Report	Brandt 11'; Mehmedi 25'; Bailey 47', 67'	Stadium: HDI-Arena; Attendance: 32,800; Referee: Sören Storks

12 January 2018 18	Bayer Leverkusen	1–3	Bayern Munich	Leverkusen
20:30 CET (UTC+1)	Volland 70'	Report	Martínez 32'; Ribéry 59'; Rodríguez 90+1'	Stadium: BayArena; Attendance: 30,210; Referee: Daniel Siebert

20 January 2018 19	1899 Hoffenheim	1–4	Bayer Leverkusen	Sinsheim
15:30 CET (UTC+1)	Szalai 86'	Report	Bailey 43'; Baumgartlinger 51'; Alario 70', 90+3'	Stadium: Wirsol Rhein-Neckar-Arena; Attendance: 28,017; Referee: Patrick Ittrich

28 January 2018 20	Bayer Leverkusen	2–0	Mainz 05	Leverkusen
15:30 CET (UTC+1)	Bailey 48'; Wendell 68' (pen.)	Report		Stadium: BayArena; Attendance: 25,471; Referee: Frank Willenborg

3 February 2018 21	SC Freiburg	0–0	Bayer Leverkusen	Freiburg
15:30 CET (UTC+1)		Report		Stadium: Schwarzwald-Stadion; Attendance: 24,000; Referee: Robert Kampka

10 February 2018 22	Bayer Leverkusen	0–2	Hertha BSC	Leverkusen
15:30 CET (UTC+1)		Report	Lazaro 43'; Kalou 58'	Stadium: BayArena; Attendance: 25,601; Referee: Patrick Ittrich

17 February 2018 23	Hamburger SV	1–2	Bayer Leverkusen	Hamburg
15:30 CET (UTC+1)	Hahn 70'	Report	Bailey 40'; Havertz 50'	Stadium: Volksparkstadion; Attendance: 45,691; Referee: Felix Brych

25 February 2018 24	Bayer Leverkusen	0–2	Schalke 04	Leverkusen
15:30 CET (UTC+1)		Report	Burgstaller 11'; Bentaleb 89' (pen.)	Stadium: BayArena; Attendance: 30,210; Referee: Daniel Siebert

3 March 2018 25	VfL Wolfsburg	1–2	Bayer Leverkusen	Wolfsburg
15:30 CET (UTC+1)	Mehmedi 79'	Report	Alario 31' (pen.); Brandt 78'	Stadium: Volkswagen Arena; Attendance: 24,354; Referee: Felix Zwayer

10 March 2018 26	Bayer Leverkusen	2–0	Borussia Mönchengladbach	Leverkusen
18:30 CET (UTC+1)	Alario 39'; Brandt 90+3'	Report		Stadium: BayArena; Attendance: 28,809; Referee: Robert Hartmann

18 March 2018 27	1. FC Köln	2–0	Bayer Leverkusen	Cologne
15:30 CET (UTC+1)	Osako 9'; Zoller 69'	Report		Stadium: RheinEnergieStadion; Attendance: 50,000; Referee: Harm Osmers

31 March 2018 28	Bayer Leverkusen	0–0	FC Augsburg	Leverkusen
15:30 CEST (UTC+2)		Report		Stadium: BayArena; Attendance: 25,831; Referee: Frank Willenborg

9 April 2018 29	RB Leipzig	1–4	Bayer Leverkusen	Leipzig
20:30 CEST (UTC+2)	Sabitzer 17'	Report	Havertz 45'; Brandt 51'; Retsos 56'; Volland 69'	Stadium: Red Bull Arena; Attendance: 35,617; Referee: Deniz Aytekin

14 April 2018 30	Bayer Leverkusen	4–1	Eintracht Frankfurt	Leverkusen
15:30 CEST (UTC+2)	Brandt 20'; Volland 71', 77', 88'	Report	Fabián 23'	Stadium: BayArena; Attendance: 30,210; Referee: Felix Brych

21 April 2018 31	Borussia Dortmund	4–0	Bayer Leverkusen	Dortmund
18:30 CEST (UTC+2)	Sancho 13'; Reus 55', 79'; Philipp 63'	Report		Stadium: Signal Iduna Park; Attendance: 81,360; Referee: Markus Schmidt

28 April 2018 32	Bayer Leverkusen	0–1	VfB Stuttgart	Leverkusen
18:30 CEST (UTC+2)		Report	Gentner 67'	Stadium: BayArena; Attendance: 30,210; Referee: Tobias Welz

5 May 2018 33	Werder Bremen	0–0	Bayer Leverkusen	Bremen
15:30 CEST (UTC+2)		Report		Stadium: Weser-Stadion; Attendance: 41,000; Referee: Robert Hartmann

12 May 2018 34	Bayer Leverkusen	3–2	Hannover 96	Leverkusen
15:30 CEST (UTC+2)	Alario 3', 18'; Brandt 55'	Report	Füllkrug 90+1'; Harnik 90+4'	Stadium: BayArena; Attendance: 30,210; Referee: Guido Winkmann

=== DFB-Pokal ===
11 August 2017 First round	Karlsruher SC	0–3 (a.e.t.)	Bayer Leverkusen	Karlsruhe
20:45 CEST (UTC+2)		Report	Kohr 93'; Pohjanpalo 99'; Bailey 105'	Stadium: Wildparkstadion; Attendance: 17,073; Referee: Robert Hartmann

24 October 2017 Second round	Bayer Leverkusen	4–1	Union Berlin	Leverkusen
18:30 CEST (UTC+2)	Brandt 36'; Alario 58'; Wendell 89' (pen.); Aránguiz 90+2'	Report	Daube 46'	Stadium: BayArena; Attendance: 24,326; Referee: Frank Willenborg
Note: The match, originally scheduled for 18:30 CEST, was delayed to 18:35 CEST due to a traffic jam around the stadium.

20 December 2017 Round of 16	Borussia Mönchengladbach	0–1	Bayer Leverkusen	Mönchengladbach
18:40 CET (UTC+1)		Report	Bailey 70'	Stadium: Borussia-Park; Attendance: 49,016; Referee: Manuel Gräfe

6 February 2018 Quarter-finals	Bayer Leverkusen	4–2 (a.e.t.)	Werder Bremen	Leverkusen
20:45 CET (UTC+1)	Brandt 31', 55'; Bellarabi 111'; Havertz 118'	Report	Kruse 4' (pen.); Jóhannsson 7'	Stadium: BayArena; Attendance: 25,653; Referee: Marco Fritz

17 April 2018 Semi-finals	Bayer Leverkusen	2–6	Bayern Munich	Leverkusen
20:45 CEST (UTC+2)	L. Bender 16'; Bailey 72'	Report	Lewandowski 3', 9'; Müller 52', 64', 78'; Thiago 60'	Stadium: BayArena; Attendance: 30,210; Referee: Daniel Siebert

== Statistics ==
=== Appearances and goals ===
No.	Pos	Nat	Player	Total		Bundesliga		DFB-Pokal	
No.	Pos	Nat	Player	Apps	Goals	Apps	Goals	Apps	Goals
Goalkeepers
1	GK	(Germany) GER	Bernd Leno	38	0	33	0	5	0
28	GK	(Austria) AUT	Ramazan Özcan	1	0	1	0	0	0
36	GK	(Germany) GER	Niklas Lomb	0	0	0	0	0	0
Defenders
2	DF	(Brazil) BRA	André Ramalho	3	0	0+3	0	0	0
3	DF	(Greece) GRE	Panagiotis Retsos	28	1	18+6	1	2+2	0
4	DF	(Germany) GER	Jonathan Tah	33	0	27+1	0	5	0
5	DF	(Germany) GER	Sven Bender	34	2	29	2	5	0
16	DF	(Croatia) CRO	Tin Jedvaj	10	0	6+4	0	0	0
18	DF	(Brazil) BRA	Wendell	30	3	26	2	4	1
39	DF	(Germany) GER	Benjamin Henrichs	28	0	11+12	0	2+3	0
Midfielders
8	MF	(Germany) GER	Lars Bender	24	3	20+1	2	2+1	1
15	MF	(Austria) AUT	Julian Baumgartlinger	24	1	17+5	1	2	0
20	MF	(Chile) CHI	Charles Aránguiz	31	2	27	1	3+1	1
21	MF	(Germany) GER	Dominik Kohr	32	2	18+10	1	4	1
22	MF	(Ukraine) UKR	Vladlen Yurchenko	0	0	0	0	0	0
29	MF	(Germany) GER	Kai Havertz	35	4	22+8	3	4+1	1
30	MF	(Germany) GER	Sam Schreck	0	0	0	0	0	0
37	MF	(Germany) GER	Marlon Frey	0	0	0	0	0	0
38	MF	(Germany) GER	Karim Bellarabi	29	2	13+11	1	3+2	1
Forwards
9	FW	(Jamaica) JAM	Leon Bailey	34	12	25+5	9	2+2	3
10	FW	(Germany) GER	Julian Brandt	39	12	26+8	9	4+1	3
11	FW	(Germany) GER	Stefan Kießling	8	0	0+8	0	0	0
13	FW	(Argentina) ARG	Lucas Alario	26	10	17+6	9	1+2	1
17	FW	(Finland) FIN	Joel Pohjanpalo	8	2	0+7	1	0+1	1
31	FW	(Germany) GER	Kevin Volland	35	14	30+1	14	4	0
Players transferred out during the season
6	DF	(Austria) AUT	Aleksandar Dragović	1	0	0+1	0	0	0
14	MF	(Switzerland) SUI	Admir Mehmedi	15	2	8+4	2	2+1	0
44	MF	(Slovenia) SVN	Kevin Kampl	1	0	0	0	1	0

Last updated: 12 May 2018
Source: Competitions
