= Lars Bender =

German footballer (born 1989)

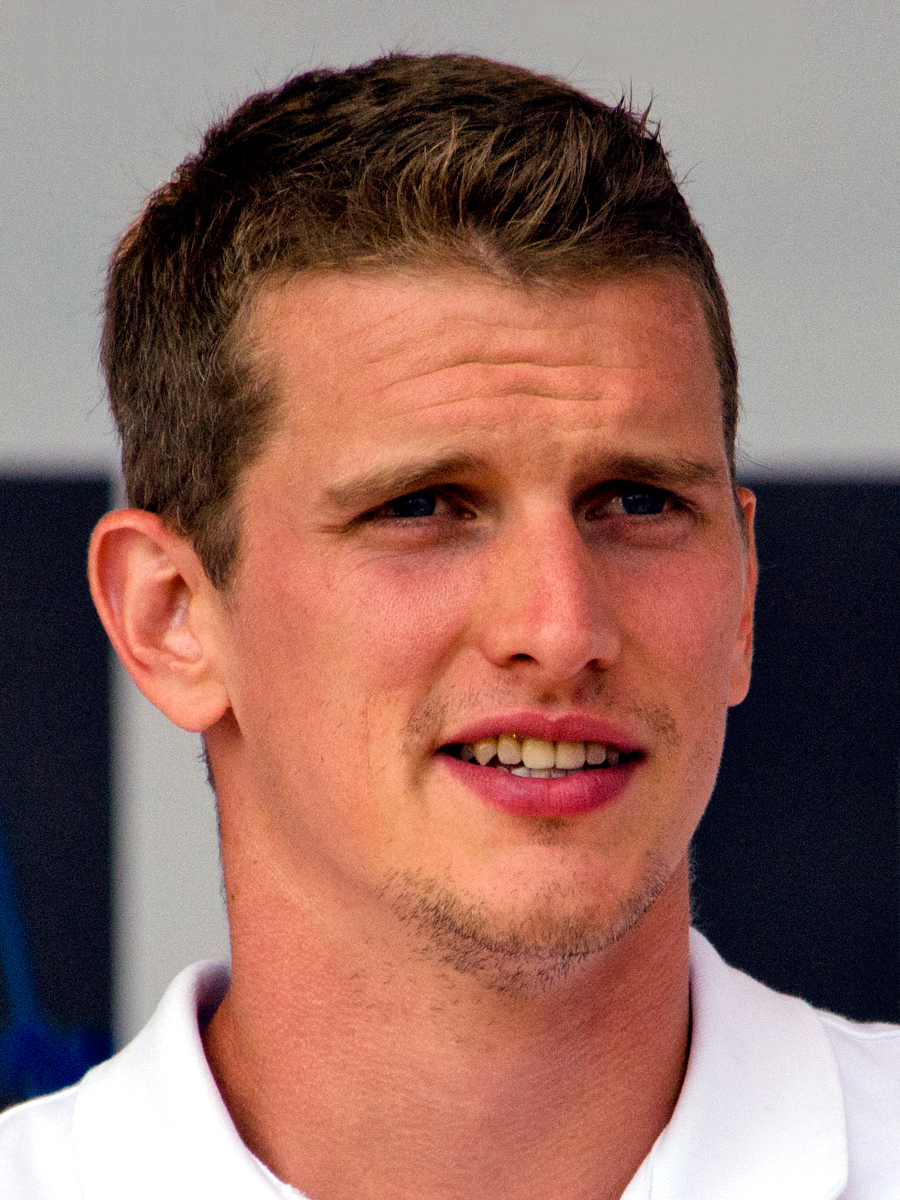
- Bender in 2018

Personal information
- Full name: Lars Bender
- Date of birth: 27 April 1989 (age 37)
- Place of birth: Rosenheim, West Germany
- Height: 1.85 m (6 ft 1 in)
- Positions: Right-back; defensive midfielder

Team information
- Current team: Bayern Munich U17 (head coach)

Youth career
- 1993–1999: TSV Brannenburg
- 1999–2002: SpVgg Unterhaching
- 2002–2006: 1860 Munich

Senior career*
| Years | Team | Apps | (Gls) |
| 2006–2009 | 1860 Munich | 58 | (4) |
| 2009–2021 | Bayer Leverkusen | 256 | (22) |
| Total | | 314 | (26) |

International career
| 2005–2006 | Germany U17 | 9 | (1) |
| 2007–2008 | Germany U19 | 9 | (2) |
| 2009 | Germany U20 | 1 | (1) |
| 2010 | Germany U21 | 1 | (0) |
| 2011–2014 | Germany | 19 | (4) |
| 2016 | Germany Olympic | 6 | (0) |

Managerial career
- 2025–2026: SV Wacker Burghausen
- 2026–: Bayern Munich U17
Medal record
Men's football
Representing Germany
Olympic Games
| Silver medal – second place | 2016 Rio de Janeiro | Team |
UEFA European Championship
| Bronze medal – third place | 2012 |
UEFA European Under-19 Championship
| Winner | 2008 |
- * Club domestic league appearances and goals

Lars Bender (German pronunciation: [ˈlaʁs ˈbɛndɐ]; born 27 April 1989) is a German professional football coach and former player who played as a right-back or defensive midfielder. He is currently the head coach of the under-17 team of Bundesliga club Bayern Munich. He is the twin brother of fellow coach and former player Sven Bender.

== Club career ==
=== Early career ===
Bender played from 1993 to 1999 in the youth of the TSV Brannenburg, from 1999 to 2002 he was part of SpVgg Unterhaching youth teams. In summer 2002, he moved to the 1860 München youth team.

=== 1860 Munich ===
In August 2006, Bender played his first game for 1860 Munich II in the Regionalliga Süd. In October, he was an unused substitute in the 1860 Munich senior team, and on 27 November 2006, when he was 17 years old, he made his professional debut at the home game against the TuS Koblenz in the 2. Bundesliga. In his first professional season, he played 13 matches, nine of them in the starting lineup. In this season, Bender won the Fritz-Walter trophy, ahead of then Mönchengladbach's Marko Marin and his twin brother, Sven Bender. In his second season, he was a regular player in the defensive midfield. On the first day of the new season, he scored his first goal. Bender started 2008–09 season again as a regular player. In the second league game against FSV Frankfurt on 3 October 2008, he took over the captaincy and was at 19 the youngest captain in the history of the 1860 Munich, but on 20 October he was seriously injured and after a number of injuries, he finished that season with only 15 matches played. In his three professional seasons played for 1860 München in the 2. Bundesliga, he played 58 games and scored four goals.

=== Bayer 04 Leverkusen ===
On 18 August 2009, Bender signed a three-year contract with Bundesliga side Bayer Leverkusen. He played his first match in the Bundesliga when coming off the bench on Matchday 6 and was used as a substitute in most of 20 games he played during his first season in Bayer Leverkusen. He scored his first goal in the Bundesliga against Eintracht Frankfurt on 16 September, an eventual 4–0 win. In the following season, his position in the defensive midfield remained competitive and he was often second choice, but he played 27 matches and scored three goals. In the 2011–12 season, he was a regular player and played most of the games over the full season, only interrupted by a forced break for a muscle bundle crack injury in the spring of 2012. On 21 March 2012, Bender signed a new contract with Leverkusen to 2018. In the 2012–13 Bundesliga season, he played 33 games, scored 3 goals and made 6 assists. On 31 October 2013, he extended his contract with Leverkusen until 2019.

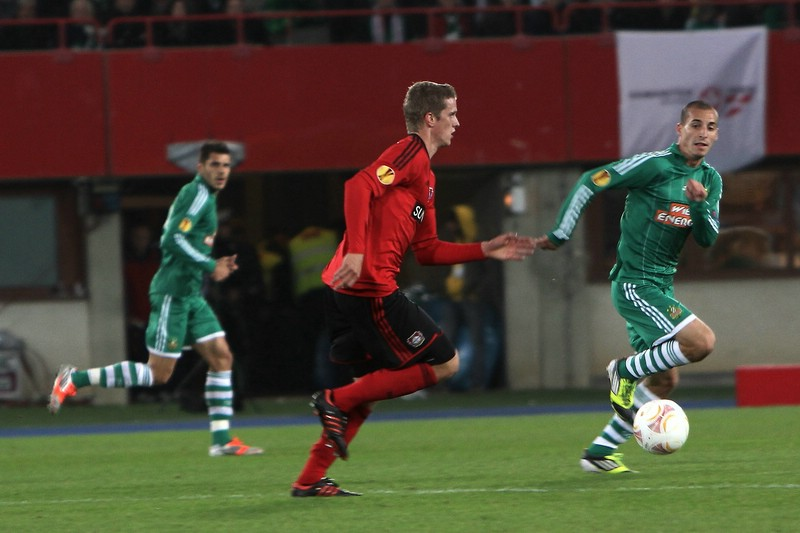
Bender playing for Bayer Leverkusen in 2012

In the 2013–14 season, he played 29 games and scored three goals in the Bundesliga, despite being injured for the most of September and October and again in the spring of 2014. In the 2014–2015 season, he returned to the field and played 26 games in Bundesliga, scoring one goal against SC Paderborn 07. In UEFA Champions League he helped Leverkusen finish runner-up in the group stage behind AS Monaco but later lost to Atlético Madrid in the Round of 16. For season 2015/16 coach Roger Schmidt appointed him as the new team captain in place of Simon Rolfes, who had ended his career after the end of the preseason. This season was a struggle for him as, after suffering a long-term injury from October 2015 until March 2016, he only made ten appearances in Bundesliga and two appearances in the Champions League. Bender abdicated the captaincy prior to the 2020–21 season due to his ongoing injury issues, passing the role over to Charles Aránguiz. Lars and Sven jointly announced that they would leave Leverkusen and retire from professional football at the end of the 2020–21 season.

Bender played his final professional match on 22 May 2021, the final matchday of the 2020–21 Bundesliga, in which Leverkusen played against Borussia Dortmund. It was his 256th top-flight match for Leverkusen. He replaced his brother Sven, who had also played his final match, in the 89th minute while Leverkusen was awarded a penalty. Lars took the penalty, and in a respectful gesture, Dortmund goalkeeper Roman Bürki allowed him to score without making any effort to save the shot. Bender's final goal of his professional career was a mere consolation goal as Leverkusen went on to lose the match 3–1.

== International career ==
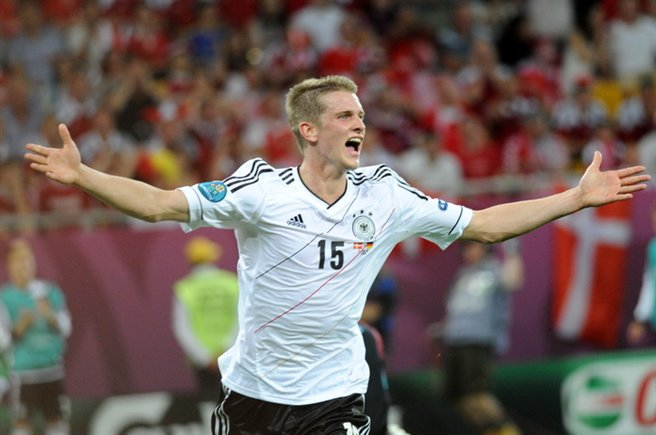
Bender celebrating his goal against Denmark during Euro 2012

He was part of the German under-19 side that won the 2008 UEFA European Under-19 Football Championship. He and his twin Sven were named jointly as players of the tournament.

Bender was chosen as part of Germany's 23-man squad for Euro 2012. He scored an 80th-minute winner in the final group game against Denmark.

On 29 May 2013, Bender scored twice in a 4–2 win over Ecuador.

He was named in Germany's provisional 30-man squad for the 2014 FIFA World Cup, but withdrew on 23 May following a thigh injury in training. Manager Joachim Löw said, "I feel personally very sorry for Lars because I know how much he wanted to be in Brazil, when a player is ruled out so close before a tournament then it is very disappointing for everyone". He played his last internationals for Germany in late 2014.

Lars was part of the Germany Olympic football team for Rio along with his twin and Nils Petersen who were the three selected over 23 years old players, winning the silver medal.

== Style of play ==
Bender normally played as a defensive midfielder or right-back. He was primarily known for his all-action style and possessed good tackling, passing and ball interception.

== Coaching career ==
In June 2022, the German Football Association appointed him as the new assistant coach of the German U-15 national team.

Bender became manager of SV Wacker Burghausen in the German fourth division in January 2025, ahead of the 2025–26 season.

In May 2026, he was appointed as head coach of the under-17s category of Bundesliga giants Bayern Munich ahead of the 2026–27 season.

== Career statistics ==
=== Club ===
Appearances and goals by club, season and competition
| Club | Season | League | | | DFB-Pokal | | Continental | | Total | |
| Club | Season | Division | Apps | Goals | Apps | Goals | Apps | Goals | Apps | Goals |
|---|---|---|---|---|---|---|---|---|---|---|
| 1860 Munich II | 2006–07 | Regionalliga Süd | 9 | 1 | — | | — | | 9 | 1 |
| 1860 Munich | 2006–07 | 2. Bundesliga | 13 | 0 | 0 | 0 | — | | 13 | 0 |
| 1860 Munich | 2007–08 | 2. Bundesliga | 28 | 1 | 3 | 0 | — | | 31 | 1 |
| 1860 Munich | 2008–09 | 2. Bundesliga | 15 | 3 | 2 | 0 | — | | 17 | 3 |
| 1860 Munich | 2009–10 | 2. Bundesliga | 2 | 0 | 1 | 0 | — | | 3 | 0 |
| 1860 Munich | Total | | 58 | 4 | 6 | 0 | — | | 64 | 4 |
| Bayer Leverkusen II | 2009–10 | Regionalliga West | 2 | 0 | — | | — | | 2 | 0 |
| Bayer Leverkusen II | 2010–11 | Regionalliga West | 1 | 0 | — | | — | | 1 | 0 |
| Bayer Leverkusen II | Total | | 3 | 0 | — | | — | | 3 | 0 |
| Bayer Leverkusen | 2009–10 | Bundesliga | 20 | 1 | 1 | 0 | — | | 21 | 1 |
| Bayer Leverkusen | 2010–11 | Bundesliga | 27 | 3 | 2 | 0 | 12 (Note: Appearances in UEFA Europa League) | 0 | 41 | 3 |
| Bayer Leverkusen | 2011–12 | Bundesliga | 28 | 4 | 1 | 0 | 8 (Note: Appearances in UEFA Champions League) | 1 | 37 | 5 |
| Bayer Leverkusen | 2012–13 | Bundesliga | 33 | 3 | 3 | 0 | 5 | 0 | 41 | 3 |
| Bayer Leverkusen | 2013–14 | Bundesliga | 29 | 3 | 4 | 1 | 6 | 0 | 39 | 4 |
| Bayer Leverkusen | 2014–15 | Bundesliga | 26 | 1 | 2 | 0 | 7 | 0 | 35 | 1 |
| Bayer Leverkusen | 2015–16 | Bundesliga | 11 | 1 | 2 | 1 | 4 | 0 | 17 | 2 |
| Bayer Leverkusen | 2016–17 | Bundesliga | 9 | 0 | 0 | 0 | 3 | 0 | 12 | 0 |
| Bayer Leverkusen | 2017–18 | Bundesliga | 21 | 2 | 3 | 1 | — | | 24 | 3 |
| Bayer Leverkusen | 2018–19 | Bundesliga | 20 | 1 | 2 | 0 | 5 | 0 | 27 | 1 |
| Bayer Leverkusen | 2019–20 | Bundesliga | 18 | 2 | 2 | 0 | 8 (Note: Four appearances in UEFA Champions League, four appearances in UEFA Europa League) | 0 | 28 | 2 |
| Bayer Leverkusen | 2020–21 | Bundesliga | 14 | 1 | 2 | 1 | 4 | 0 | 20 | 2 |
| Bayer Leverkusen | Total | | 256 | 22 | 24 | 4 | 62 | 1 | 342 | 27 |
| Career total | | | 326 | 27 | 30 | 4 | 62 | 1 | 418 | 32 |

=== International ===
Scores and results list Germany's goal tally first.

| No. | Date | Venue | Opponent | Score | Result | Competition |
|---|---|---|---|---|---|---|
| 1. | 17 June 2012 | Arena Lviv, Lviv, Ukraine | Denmark | 2–1 | 2–1 | UEFA Euro 2012 |
| 2. | 29 May 2013 | FAU Stadium, Boca Raton, United States | Ecuador | 2–0 | 4–2 | Friendly |
| 3. | 29 May 2013 | FAU Stadium, Boca Raton, United States | Ecuador | 3–0 | 4–2 | Friendly |
| 4. | 14 August 2013 | Fritz-Walter-Stadion, Kaiserslautern, Germany | Paraguay | 3–3 | 3–3 | Friendly |

== Honours ==
Germany Youth

- UEFA European Under-19 Championship: 2008
- Summer Olympic Games: Silver Medal, 2016

Individual

- Fritz Walter Medal U17 Gold Medal 2006
- UEFA European Under-19 Football Championship Golden Player: 2008
