= Karim Bellarabi =

German footballer (born 1990)

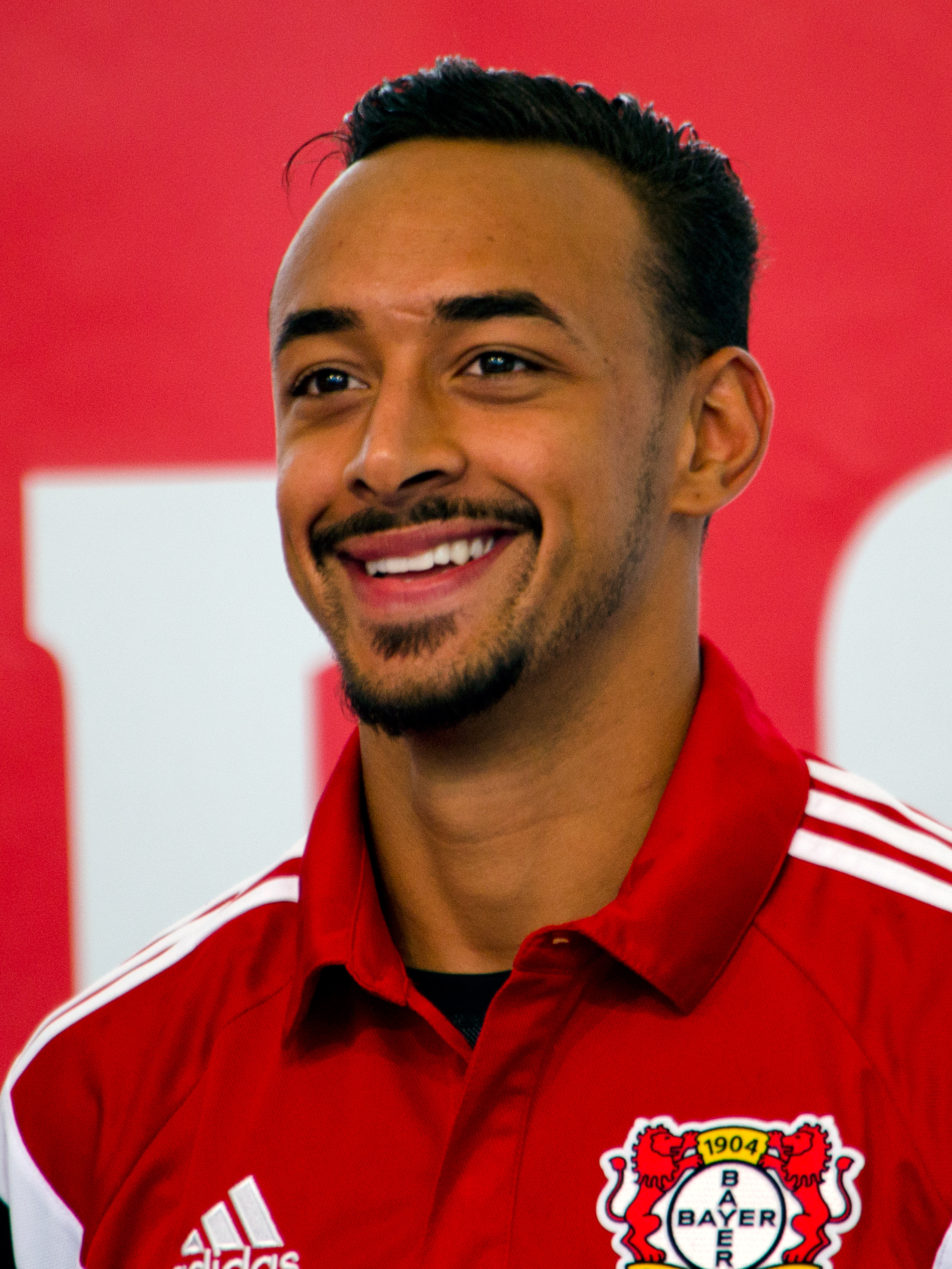
- Bellarabi with Bayer Leverkusen in 2014

Personal information
- Date of birth: 8 April 1990 (age 36)
- Place of birth: West Berlin, West Germany
- Height: 1.84 m (6 ft 0 in)
- Position: Winger

Youth career
- FC Huchting
- 1998–2004: Werder Bremen
- 2004–2007: FC Oberneuland

Senior career*
Years	Team	Apps	(Gls)
2007–2008	FC Oberneuland	7	(2)
2008–2010	Eintracht Braunschweig II	22	(11)
2008–2011	Eintracht Braunschweig	38	(8)
2011–2012	Bayer Leverkusen II	5	(0)
2011–2023	Bayer Leverkusen	215	(34)
2013–2014	→ Eintracht Braunschweig (loan)	26	(3)
Total		313	(58)

International career
2010–2011	Germany U20	4	(1)
2012	Germany U21	5	(0)
2014–2016	Germany	11	(1)
- * Club domestic league appearances and goals

Karim Bellarabi (born 8 April 1990) is a German former professional footballer who played as a winger.

== Early life ==
Bellarabi was born in West Berlin, to a Moroccan father and a German mother. He grew up in Bremen, where he played youth football for local clubs FC Huchting, Werder Bremen, and FC Oberneuland.

== Club career ==
In 2008, Bellarabi joined the under-19 side of Eintracht Braunschweig. He made his senior debut for them during the 2008–09 season, followed by two more appearances during the 2009–10 league campaign. He finally became a regular starter during the 2010–11 3. Liga season and attracted notice due to his performance.

After the season, he left Braunschweig for Bundesliga side Bayer 04 Leverkusen. Due to injury, Bellarabi missed most of the 2012–13 Bundesliga season. In 2013, he returned from Leverkusen to Eintracht Braunschweig, by now playing in the Bundesliga as well, on a one-year loan deal.

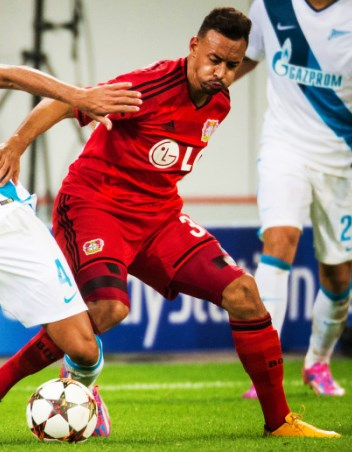
Bellarabi playing for Leverkusen in 2014

Bellarabi returned to Leverkusen at the start of the 2014–15 season. On 23 August 2014, he scored the fastest goal in Bundesliga history, just in 9 seconds, on the opening match of the 2014–15 season, away to Borussia Dortmund, he led the way to a 0–2 win.

On 17 February 2017 Bellarabi scored the 50,000th goal in Bundesliga history.

In July 2018 he collapsed in a pre-season friendly.

On 13 August 2020, he extended his stay at the BayArena until 2023 amid interest from other clubs.

By the end of his career he had scored 37 goals in 241 German top-flight matches.

== International career ==
Bellarabi has played youth international football for the German under-20 and under-21 teams. He was called up by the senior team in October 2014.

He made his senior international debut for Germany on 11 October 2014 in a 2–0 UEFA Euro 2016 qualifying defeat away to Poland, playing the full 90 minutes. On 13 June 2015, Bellarabi scored his first international goal in a 7–0 win against Gibraltar. He won 11 caps in total.

== Career statistics ==
=== Club ===
Appearances and goals by club, season and competition
Club	Season	League			DFB-Pokal		Continental		Other		Total	
Club	Season	Division	Apps	Goals	Apps	Goals	Apps	Goals	Apps	Goals	Apps	Goals
FC Oberneuland	2007–08	Oberliga Nord	7	3	—		—		3 (Note: Appearance(s) in Regionalliga playoffs)	0	10	3
Eintracht Braunschweig	2008–09	3. Liga	1	0	—		—		—		1	0
Eintracht Braunschweig	2009–10	3. Liga	2	0	0	0	—		—		2	0
Eintracht Braunschweig	2010–11	3. Liga	35	8	1	0	—		—		36	8
Eintracht Braunschweig	Total		38	8	1	0	—		—		39	8
Bayer Leverkusen	2011–12	Bundesliga	10	1	0	0	2 (Note: Appearance(s) in UEFA Champions League)	1	—		12	2
Bayer Leverkusen	2012–13	Bundesliga	8	0	1	1	2 (Note: Appearance(s) in UEFA Europa League)	1	—		11	2
Bayer Leverkusen	2014–15	Bundesliga	33	12	3	0	10	1	—		46	13
Bayer Leverkusen	2015–16	Bundesliga	33	6	4	2	12 (Note: Eight appearances and one goal in UEFA Champions League, four appearances and three goals in UEFA Europa League)	4	—		49	12
Bayer Leverkusen	2016–17	Bundesliga	16	2	1	1	2	1	—		19	4
Bayer Leverkusen	2017–18	Bundesliga	24	1	5	1	—		—		29	2
Bayer Leverkusen	2018–19	Bundesliga	19	5	2	2	3	2	—		24	9
Bayer Leverkusen	2019–20	Bundesliga	26	4	6	2	7 (Note: Five appearances in UEFA Champions League, two appearances in UEFA Europa League)	0	—		39	6
Bayer Leverkusen	2020–21	Bundesliga	22	0	2	0	5	3	—		29	3
Bayer Leverkusen	2021–22	Bundesliga	16	3	1	1	5	0	—		22	4
Bayer Leverkusen	2022–23	Bundesliga	8	0	1	0	1	0	—		10	0
Bayer Leverkusen	Total		215	34	26	10	49	13	—		290	57
Bayer Leverkusen II	2011–12	Regionalliga West	2	0	—		—		—		2	0
Bayer Leverkusen II	2013–14	Regionalliga West	3	0	—		—		—		3	0
Bayer Leverkusen II	Total		5	0	—		—		—		5	0
Eintracht Braunschweig (loan)	2013–14	Bundesliga	26	3	0	0	—		—		26	3
Career total			291	48	27	10	49	13	3	0	370	71

=== International ===
Score and result list Germany's goal tally first, score column indicates score after Bellarabi goal.

International goal scored by Karim Bellarabi
No.	Date	Venue	Opponent	Score	Result	Competition
1	13 June 2015	Estádio Algarve, Algarve, Portugal	Gibraltar	4–0	7–0	UEFA Euro 2016 qualification
