= Julian Baumgartlinger =

Austrian footballer (born 1988)

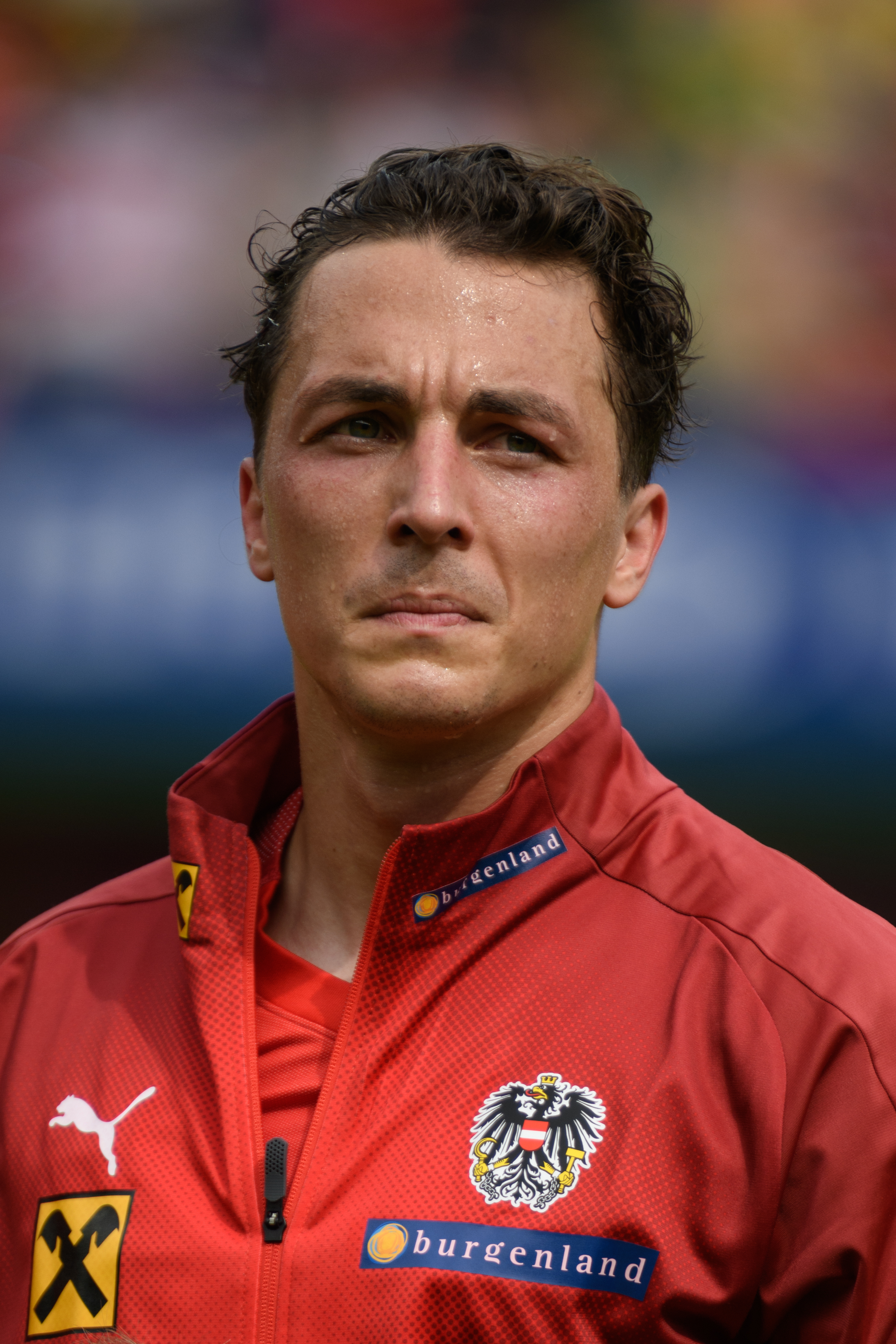
- Baumgartlinger with Austria in 2018

Personal information
- Full name: Julian Jakob Baumgartlinger
- Date of birth: 2 January 1988 (age 38)
- Place of birth: Salzburg, Austria
- Height: 1.81 m (5 ft 11 in)
- Position: Defensive midfielder

Youth career
- 1996–2001: USC Mattsee
- 2001–2006: 1860 Munich

Senior career*
Years	Team	Apps	(Gls)
2006–2009	1860 Munich II	37	(1)
2007–2009	1860 Munich	13	(0)
2009–2011	Austria Wien	61	(1)
2011–2016	Mainz 05	124	(2)
2016–2022	Bayer Leverkusen	115	(5)
2022–2023	FC Augsburg	16	(0)
Total		366	(9)

International career
2003–2004	Austria U16	2	(0)
2004–2005	Austria U17	4	(0)
2005–2006	Austria U18	2	(0)
2006–2007	Austria U19	15	(0)
2008	Austria U20	3	(0)
2007–2009	Austria U21	17	(1)
2009–2021	Austria	84	(1)
- * Club domestic league appearances and goals

Julian Jakob Baumgartlinger (born 2 January 1988) is an Austrian former professional footballer who played as a midfielder.

== Career ==
Growing up in the Austrian market town of Mattsee, Baumgartlinger began playing football at local USC Mattsee at age five. In 2001, he left Austria to join the renowned youth academy of 1860 Munich. There he ran through all the youth teams and eventually was called to their first team in 2007. After having played 13 times, mostly as substitute, in the 2007–08 and 2008–09 seasons, he accepted a call from Austrian club Austria Wien to return to his homeland after eight years.

In Vienna, Baumgartlinger spent two successful years, becoming a regular for his club as well as for the Austria national team. This attracted the attention of Bundesliga team Mainz 05, which acquired his services for a transfer fee estimated at €1.1 million. On 19 May 2016, it was announced Baumgartlinger had signed a four-year contract with Bayer Leverkusen.

On 16 August 2022, Baumgartlinger joined Augsburg on a one-season contract. He made his debut against Mainz 05 on 20 August 2022.

Baumgartlinger announced his retirement from professional football on 24 July 2023.

== International career ==
He represented the national team at UEFA Euro 2016, and UEFA Euro 2020.

== Career statistics ==
=== Club ===
Appearances and goals by club, season and competition
Club	Season	League			Cup		Continental		Total	
Club	Season	Division	Apps	Goals	Apps	Goals	Apps	Goals	Apps	Goals
1860 Munich II	2006–07	Regionalliga Süd	10	1	—		—		10	1
1860 Munich II	2007–08	Regionalliga Süd	17	0	—		—		17	0
1860 Munich II	2008–09	Regionalliga Süd	10	0	—		—		10	0
1860 Munich II	Total		37	1	—		—		37	1
1860 Munich	2007–08	2. Bundesliga	5	0	1	0	—		6	0
1860 Munich	2008–09	2. Bundesliga	8	0	0	0	—		8	0
1860 Munich	Total		13	0	1	0	—		14	0
Austria Wien	2009–10	Austrian Bundesliga	30	0	3	0	9 (Note: Appearance(s) in UEFA Europa League)	0	42	0
Austria Wien	2010–11	Austrian Bundesliga	31	1	4	0	5	2	40	3
Austria Wien	Total		61	1	7	0	14	2	82	3
Mainz 05	2011–12	Bundesliga	26	0	3	0	1	0	30	0
Mainz 05	2012–13	Bundesliga	32	0	4	1	—		36	1
Mainz 05	2013–14	Bundesliga	9	0	1	0	—		10	0
Mainz 05	2014–15	Bundesliga	26	0	0	0	2	0	28	0
Mainz 05	2015–16	Bundesliga	31	2	2	0	—		33	2
Mainz 05	Total		124	2	10	1	3	0	137	3
Mainz II	2013–14	Regionalliga Südwest	2	1	—		—		2	1
Bayer Leverkusen	2016–17	Bundesliga	22	0	2	0	6 (Note: Appearance(s) in UEFA Champions League)	0	30	0
Bayer Leverkusen	2017–18	Bundesliga	22	1	2	0	—		24	1
Bayer Leverkusen	2018–19	Bundesliga	21	0	2	0	4	0	27	0
Bayer Leverkusen	2019–20	Bundesliga	27	2	3	0	10 (Note: Six appearances in UEFA Champions League, four appearances in UEFA Europa League)	0	40	2
Bayer Leverkusen	2020–21	Bundesliga	17	2	2	0	5	1	24	3
Bayer Leverkusen	2021–22	Bundesliga	6	0	1	0	0	0	7	0
Bayer Leverkusen	Total		115	5	12	0	25	1	152	6
Augsburg	2022–23	Bundesliga	16	0	1	0	—		11	0
Augsburg	Total		16	0	1	0	0	0	11	0
Career total			368	10	31	1	42	3	441	14

=== International ===
As of match played 13 June 2021

Appearances and goals by national team and year
National team	Year	Apps	Goals
Austria	2009	4	0
Austria	2010	4	0
Austria	2011	10	0
Austria	2012	7	0
Austria	2013	4	0
Austria	2014	5	1
Austria	2015	8	0
Austria	2016	11	0
Austria	2017	6	0
Austria	2018	7	0
Austria	2019	8	0
Austria	2020	8	0
Austria	2021	2	0
Total		84	1

Scores and results list Austria's goal tally first, score column indicates score after each Baumgartlinger goal.

List of international goals scored by Julian Baumgartlinger
No.	Date	Venue	Opponent	Score	Result	Competition
1.	3 June 2014	Andrův stadion, Olomouc, Czech Republic	Czech Republic	2–1	2–1	Friendly
