= Ramazan Özcan =

Austrian footballer

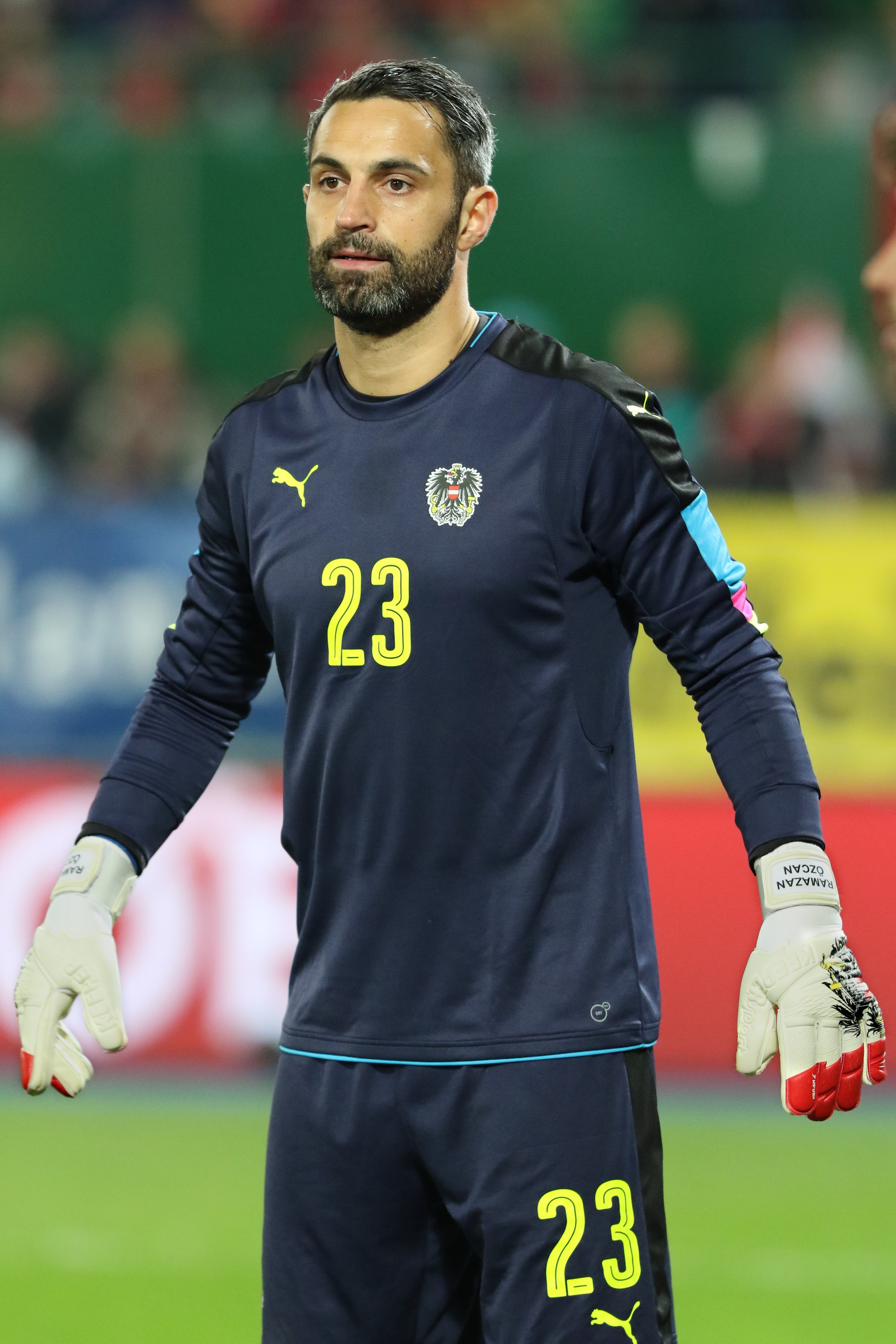
- Özcan playing for Austria in 2016

Personal information
- Full name: Ramazan Özcan
- Date of birth: 28 June 1984 (age 42)
- Place of birth: Hohenems, Austria
- Height: 1.88 m (6 ft 2 in)
- Position: Goalkeeper

Youth career
- BNZ Vorarlberg

Senior career*
Years	Team	Apps	(Gls)
2003–2006	Austria Lustenau	86	(0)
2006–2007	Red Bull Salzburg	2	(0)
2007	Red Bull Salzburg II	8	(0)
2008	→ 1899 Hoffenheim (loan)	17	(0)
2008–2010	1899 Hoffenheim	8	(0)
2010	→ Beşiktaş (loan)	0	(0)
2011–2016	FC Ingolstadt 04	147	(0)
2016–2020	Bayer Leverkusen	3	(0)
Total		271	(0)

International career
	Austria U21	24	(0)
2008–2016	Austria	10	(0)
- * Club domestic league appearances and goals

Ramazan Özcan (German pronunciation: [ˈʁamazan ˈʔøːsdʒan] born 28 June 1984) is an Austrian former professional footballer who played as a goalkeeper, mainly for his first club Austria Lustenau as well as German club FC Ingolstadt 04.

== Career ==
=== Club ===
Özcan started his professional career with Austria Lustenau in 2003, and moved to Red Bull Salzburg in the summer of 2006. He spent one season and a half with Salzburg as the club's third-choice goalkeeper and only made three Bundesliga appearances in the final stages of the 2006–07 season.

He moved to German 2. Bundesliga side 1899 Hoffenheim in the winter break of the 2007–08 season on an initial six-month loan and played all seventeen league games in the second half of the season as the club secured promotion to the Bundesliga. In these seventeen games, he only conceded twenty goals. He was signed by the club on a five-year contract upon the end of the season, but on 30 December 2009 he left Germany to sign on loan for Beşiktaş.

=== International ===
Following Helge Payer's withdrawal due to illness, Özcan was named to Austria's 23-man squad for the UEFA Euro 2008 finals, but did not play any matches during the tournament. He made his international debut in a friendly match against Italy on 20 August 2008, replacing Alex Manninger at half-time. The match ended in a 2–2 draw. He represented the national team at 2016 UEFA Euro.

== Personal life ==
Özcan is of Turkish descent and holds Turkish citizenship as well.

== Career statistics ==
=== Club ===
Appearances and goals by club, season and competition
Club	Season	League			National cup		Europe		Total	
Club	Season	Division	Apps	Goals	Apps	Goals	Apps	Goals	Apps	Goals
Austria Lustenau	2003–04	Austrian First League	26	0	2	0	—		28	0
Austria Lustenau	2004–05	Austrian First League	24	0	3	0	—		27	0
Austria Lustenau	2005–06	Austrian First League	36	0	2	0	—		38	0
Austria Lustenau	Total		86	0	7	0	—		93	0
Red Bull Salzburg	2006–07	Austrian Bundesliga	2	0	3	0	0	0	5	0
Red Bull Salzburg	2007–08	Austrian Bundesliga	0	0	0	0	0	0	0	0
Red Bull Salzburg	Total		2	0	3	0	0	0	5	0
Red Bull Salzburg II	2007–08	Austrian First League	8	0	—		—		8	0
1899 Hoffenheim (loan)	2007–08	2. Bundesliga	17	0	2	0	—		19	0
1899 Hoffenheim	2008–09	Bundesliga	8	0	2	0	—		10	0
1899 Hoffenheim	2009–10	Bundesliga	0	0	0	0	—		0	0
1899 Hoffenheim	2010–11	Bundesliga	0	0	0	0	—		0	0
1899 Hoffenheim	Total		25	0	4	0	—		29	0
Beşiktaş (loan)	2009–10	Süper Lig	0	0	2	0	—		2	0
FC Ingolstadt 04	2011–12	2. Bundesliga	22	0	0	0	—		22	0
FC Ingolstadt 04	2012–13	2. Bundesliga	32	0	1	0	—		33	0
FC Ingolstadt 04	2013–14	2. Bundesliga	32	0	3	0	—		35	0
FC Ingolstadt 04	2014–15	2. Bundesliga	33	0	0	0	—		33	0
FC Ingolstadt 04	2015–16	Bundesliga	28	0	0	0	—		28	0
FC Ingolstadt 04	Total		147	0	4	0	—		151	0
Bayer Leverkusen	2016–17	Bundesliga	0	0	1	0	1	0	2	0
Bayer Leverkusen	2017–18	Bundesliga	1	0	0	0	—		1	0
Bayer Leverkusen	2018–19	Bundesliga	2	0	1	0	1	0	4	0
Bayer Leverkusen	2019–20	Bundesliga	0	0	1	0	0	0	1	0
Bayer Leverkusen	Total		3	0	3	0	2	0	8	0
Career total			271	0	21	0	2	0	294	0

=== International ===
Appearances and goals by national team and year
National team	Year	Apps	Goals
Austria	2008	1	0
Austria	2013	0	0
Austria	2014	2	0
Austria	2015	2	0
Austria	2016	5	0
Total		10	0
