= Samed Onur =

Turkish footballer

Personal information
- Date of birth: 15 July 2002 (age 24)
- Place of birth: Düsseldorf, Germany
- Height: 1.75 m (5 ft 9 in)
- Position: Winger

Team information
- Current team: Samsunspor
- Number: 8

Youth career
- 2012–2020: Bayer Leverkusen

Senior career*
Years	Team	Apps	(Gls)
2020–2021	Bayer Leverkusen	0	(0)
2021–2024	Fatih Karagümrük	19	(1)
2024	Sakaryaspor	12	(0)
2024–2026	Gençlerbirliği	54	(1)
2026–	Samsunspor	1	(0)

International career^{‡}
2019	Turkey U17	3	(0)
- * Club domestic league appearances and goals as of 18 August 2026 ‡ National team caps and goals as of 26 October 2024

Samed Onur (born 15 July 2002) is a professional footballer who plays as a winger for Samsunspor. Born in Germany, Onur is a youth international for Turkey.

== Professional career ==
Onur joined the youth academy of Bayer Leverkusen in 2012 at the age of 10. Onur made his professional debut with Bayer Leverkusen in a 4-0 UEFA Europa League win against SK Slavia Prague on 10 December 2020.

On 12 July 2021, Onur signed with Süper Lig club Fatih Karagümrük on a free transfer.
