= Robin Brüseke =

German footballer

Personal information
- Date of birth: 14 September 1993 (age 33)
- Place of birth: Germany
- Height: 1.84 m (6 ft 0 in)
- Position: Goalkeeper

Team information
- Current team: Rot Weiss Ahlen
- Number: 32

Youth career
- FC Stukenbrock
- –2008: SC Paderborn
- 2008–2014: SC Verl

Senior career*
Years	Team	Apps	(Gls)
2014–2022	SC Verl	175	(0)
2022–	Rot Weiss Ahlen	41	(0)
- * Club domestic league appearances and goals as of 25 April 2024

Robin Brüseke (born 14 September 1993) is a German professional footballer who plays as a goalkeeper for Rot Weiss Ahlen.

== Career statistics ==
As of match played 1 July 2021

Appearances and goals by club, season and competition
Club	Season	League			DFB-Pokal		Other		Total	
Club	Season	Division	Apps	Goals	Apps	Goals	Apps	Goals	Apps	Goals
SC Verl	2013–14	Regionalliga West	2	0	—		0	0	2	0
SC Verl	2014–15	Regionalliga West	2	0	—		0	0	2	0
SC Verl	2015–16	Regionalliga West	4	0	—		0	0	4	0
SC Verl	2016–17	Regionalliga West	33	0	—		0	0	33	0
SC Verl	2017–18	Regionalliga West	33	0	—		0	0	33	0
SC Verl	2018–19	Regionalliga West	33	0	—		0	0	33	0
SC Verl	2019–20	Regionalliga West	23	0	3	0	2 (Note: Appearance(s) in Regionalliga promotion play-offs)	0	28	0
SC Verl	2020–21	3. Liga	35	0	—		0	0	35	0
Career total			165	0	3	0	2	0	170	0
