= Jesper Brechtel =

Finnish footballer (born 1994)

Personal information
- Date of birth: 21 January 1994 (age 32)
- Place of birth: Germany
- Position: Midfielder

Senior career*
Years	Team	Apps	(Gls)
2013–2014	Karlsruher SC II		
2014	Turun Palloseura	22	(1)
2015–2017	SC Hauenstein	50	(16)
2017	SV Spielberg	5	(0)
2018–2020	SV Rülzheim	38	(6)
- * Club domestic league appearances and goals

Jesper Brechtel (born 21 January 1994) is a former footballer who played as a midfielder. Born in Germany, he was a Finland youth international.

== Early life ==
Brechtel was born in 1994 in Germany. He moved to Kaizerslautern, Germany at the age of eleven.

== Career ==
Brechtel started his career with German side Karlsruher SC II. He was regarded as one of the club's youth teams most important players. In 2014, he signed for Finnish side Turun Palloseura. In 2015, he signed for German side SC Hauenstein. In 2017, he signed for German side SV Spielberg. In 2018, he signed for German side SV Rülzheim.

== Style of play ==
Brechtel operated as a midfielder. He mainly operated as a central midfielder.

== Personal life ==
Brechtel obtained a Finnish passport. He was born to a Finnish mother and a German father.
