= Lucas Diarte =

Argentine footballer

Personal information
- Full name: Lucas Martín Diarte
- Date of birth: 4 June 1993 (age 33)
- Place of birth: Argentine
- Height: 1.74 m (5 ft 9 in)
- Position: Left-back

Team information
- Current team: San Martín Tucumán

Youth career
- –2016: Estudiantes

Senior career*
Years	Team	Apps	(Gls)
2016–2018	Estudiantes	34	(0)
2014–2015	→ Central Córdoba SdE (loan)	40	(0)
2018–2023	San Martín Tucumán	95	(6)
2023–2026	Belgrano	25	(1)
2024	→ Melgar (loan)	4	(0)
2024	→ San Martín Tucumán (loan)	19	(0)
2025	→ San Martín SJ (loan)	22	(0)
2026–	San Martín Tucumán	10	(0)
- * Club domestic league appearances and goals as of 17:18, 4 May 2026 (UTC)

Lucas Martín Diarte (born 4 June 1993) is an Argentine footballer who plays as a left-back for San Martín Tucumán.
