= 2012 Suruga Bank Championship =

Kashima Antlers	Universidad de Chile
(Japan)	(Chile)
2	2
- Kashima Antlers won 7–6 in penalty shootout
- Date: August 1, 2012
- Venue: Kashima Soccer Stadium, Kashima
- Referee: Chris Beath (Australia)
- Attendance: 20,021
- Weather: Clear; 27.8 °C (82.0 °F); 80% humidity

The 2012 Suruga Bank Championship (Japanese: スルガ銀行チャンピオンシップ2012; Spanish: Copa Suruga Bank 2012) was the fifth edition of the Suruga Bank Championship, the club football match co-organized by the Japan Football Association, the football governing body of Japan, and CONMEBOL, the football governing body of South America, between the winners of the previous season's J.League Cup and Copa Sudamericana. It was contested by Japanese club Kashima Antlers, the 2011 J.League Cup champion, and Chilean club Universidad de Chile, the 2011 Copa Sudamericana champion.

Kashima Antlers won 7–6 in penalty shootout, after drawing 2–2 in the ninety minutes of play.

== Qualified teams ==
Team	Qualification	Previous appearances
(Japan) Kashima Antlers	2011 J.League Cup champion	None
Universidad de Chile	2011 Copa Sudamericana champion	None

== Rules ==
The Suruga Bank Championship is played over one match, hosted by the winner of the J.League Cup. If the score is tied at the end of regulation, the winner is determined by a penalty shootout (no extra time is played). A maximum of seven substitutions may be made during the match.

== Match details ==
August 1, 2012
19:00 UTC+09:00

Kashima Antlers (Japan)	2–2	Universidad de Chile
Iwamasa 18'; Renato Cajá 27'	Report	Iwamasa 40' (o.g.); Aránguiz 73' (pen.)
Penalties
Juninho (penalty scored); Koroki (penalty scored); Ogasawara (penalty scored); Endo (penalty scored); Motoyama (penalty scored); Araiba (penalty scored); Nishi (penalty scored)	7–6	(penalty scored) Aránguiz; (penalty scored) Rodríguez; (penalty scored) Lorenzetti; (penalty scored) Cereceda; (penalty scored) Marino; (penalty scored) Herrera; (penalty missed) Castro

Kashima Soccer Stadium, Kashima
Attendance: 20,021
Referee: Chris Beath (Australia)

Kashima Antlers	Universidad de Chile

KASHIMA ANTLERS:
GK	21	(Japan) Hitoshi Sogahata
DF	3	(Japan) Daiki Iwamasa
DF	7	(Japan) Toru Araiba
DF	22	(Japan) Daigo Nishi
DF	6	(Japan) Kōji Nakata (c)
MF	33	(Brazil) Renato Cajá		(substituted off) 73'
MF	11	(Brazil) Júnior Dutra	(yellow card) 29'	(substituted off) 56'
MF	20	(Japan) Gaku Shibasaki		(substituted off) 62'
MF	40	(Japan) Mitsuo Ogasawara
FW	9	(Japan) Yuya Osako		(substituted off) 69'
FW	13	(Japan) Shinzo Koroki
Substitutes:
GK	1	(Japan) Akihiro Sato
MF	10	(Japan) Masashi Motoyama		(substituted on) 73'
MF	15	(Japan) Takeshi Aoki		(substituted on) 62'
MF	25	(Japan) Yasushi Endo		(substituted on) 56'
MF	28	(Japan) Shoma Doi
FW	8	(Brazil) Juninho		(substituted on) 69'
FW	19	(Japan) Hideya Okamoto
Manager:
(Brazil) Jorginho

UNIVERSIDAD DE CHILE:
GK	25	(Chile) Johnny Herrera
DF	14	(Chile) Paulo Magalhaes
DF	4	(Chile) Osvaldo González (c)
DF	13	(Chile) José Manuel Rojas
MF	6	(Argentina) Matías Rodríguez
MF	2	(Argentina) Ezequiel Videla	(substituted off) 42'
MF	20	(Chile) Charles Aránguiz
MF	3	(Chile) Eugenio Mena
FW	19	(Chile) Sebastián Ubilla	(substituted off) 63'
FW	9	(Argentina) Enzo Gutiérrez	(substituted off) 80'
FW	11	(Argentina) Luciano Civelli	(substituted off) 54'
Substitutes:
GK	12	(Chile) Paulo Garcés
DF	5	(Chile) Albert Acevedo
DF	21	(Ecuador) Eduardo Morante
MF	8	(Argentina) Guillermo Marino	(substituted on) 42'
MF	22	(Argentina) Gustavo Lorenzetti	(substituted on) 63'
MF	15	(Chile) Roberto Cereceda	(substituted on) 54'
FW	16	(Chile) Francisco Castro	(substituted on) 80'
Manager:
(Argentina) Jorge Sampaoli

Assistant referees:
Paul Cetrangalo (Australia)
Nathan MacDonald (Australia)
Fourth official:
Masaaki Toma (Japan)

Suruga Bank Championship
2012 Champion

Kashima Antlers
First Title
