= 2012 in Japanese football =

2012 season

Japanese football in 2012

== Domestic leagues ==
=== Promotion and relegation ===
Teams relegated from J.League Division 1

- Avispa Fukuoka
- Montedio Yamagata
- Ventforet Kofu

Teams promoted to J.League Division 1

- Sagan Tosu
- F.C. Tokyo
- Consadole Sapporo

Teams relegated from J.League Division 2

No relegation to the Japan Football League

Teams promoted to J.League Division 2

- Matsumoto Yamaga F.C.
- F.C. Machida Zelvia

=== J.League Division 1 ===
Sanfrecce Hiroshima won the J. League title, their first in 42 years and first in the J. League era, marking their sixth time overall atop the Japanese football league system. Vegalta Sendai, which led the table riding on the wave of their fourth-place finish the previous year, ended up in second place after Albirex Niigata defeated them in the round before last. Urawa Red Diamonds was able to pass four other teams, including newly promoted Sagan Tosu, who surprisingly was in third place in the penultimate round.

Consadole Sapporo was relegated on September 30, the earliest a team has been relegated in the modern-day era. Niigata's victory enabled them to climb to safety while Vissel Kobe was relegated after six seasons. Gamba Osaka, despite scoring more goals than anyone else, had a poor defense and allowed many goals in, causing them to be relegated after 26 seasons in the top division.

Pos	Team	Pld	W	D	L	GF	GA	GD	Pts	Qualification or relegation
1	Sanfrecce Hiroshima (C)	34	19	7	8	63	34	+29	64	Qualification to 2012 Club World Cup and 2013 Champions League
2	Vegalta Sendai	34	15	12	7	59	43	+16	57	Qualification to 2013 Champions League (Note: The winners of the 2012 Emperor's Cup qualified for the group stage of the 2013 AFC Champions League.)
3	Urawa Red Diamonds	34	15	10	9	47	42	+5	55	Qualification to 2013 Champions League
4	Yokohama F. Marinos	34	13	14	7	44	33	+11	53	
5	Sagan Tosu	34	15	8	11	48	39	+9	53	
6	Kashiwa Reysol	34	15	7	12	57	52	+5	52	Qualification to 2013 Champions League
7	Nagoya Grampus	34	15	7	12	46	47	−1	52	
8	Kawasaki Frontale	34	14	8	12	51	50	+1	50	
9	Shimizu S-Pulse	34	14	7	13	39	40	−1	49	
10	FC Tokyo	34	14	6	14	47	44	+3	48	
11	Kashima Antlers	34	12	10	12	50	43	+7	46	
12	Júbilo Iwata	34	13	7	14	57	53	+4	46	
13	Omiya Ardija	34	11	11	12	38	45	−7	44	
14	Cerezo Osaka	34	11	9	14	47	53	−6	42	
15	Albirex Niigata	34	10	10	14	29	34	−5	40	
16	Vissel Kobe (R)	34	11	6	17	41	50	−9	39	Relegation to 2013 J.League Division 2
17	Gamba Osaka (R)	34	9	11	14	67	65	+2	38	Relegation to 2013 J.League Division 2
18	Consadole Sapporo (R)	34	4	2	28	25	88	−63	14	Relegation to 2013 J.League Division 2

Updated to match(es) played on 1 December 2012. Source: J.League Division 1
Rules for classification: 1) points; 2) goal difference; 3) number of goals scored.
(C) Champions; (R) Relegated

=== J.League Division 2 ===
Ventforet Kofu returned to the top flight at the first attempt, but this time they did so as champions. Shonan Bellmare returned to the top division as well, after two seasons. Oita Trinita, despite overwhelming odds due to its position and the playoff rules which favored the three higher-ranked teams, won the playoff and returned to the top flight after three seasons.

Newly promoted Machida Zelvia, despite hiring Osvaldo Ardiles as their manager, could not cope with professionalism and finished in bottom place, being relegated as V-Varen Nagasaki won the JFL championship.

Pos	Team	Pld	W	D	L	GF	GA	GD	Pts	Promotion or relegation
1	Ventforet Kofu (C, P)	42	24	14	4	63	35	+28	86	Promotion to 2013 J.League Division 1
2	Shonan Bellmare (P)	42	20	15	7	66	43	+23	75	Promotion to 2013 J.League Division 1
3	Kyoto Sanga	42	23	5	14	61	45	+16	74	Qualification for promotion playoffs
4	Yokohama FC	42	22	7	13	62	45	+17	73	Qualification for promotion playoffs
5	JEF United Chiba	42	21	9	12	61	33	+28	72	Qualification for promotion playoffs
6	Oita Trinita (O, P)	42	21	8	13	59	40	+19	71	Qualification for promotion playoffs
7	Tokyo Verdy	42	20	6	16	65	46	+19	66	
8	Fagiano Okayama	42	17	14	11	41	34	+7	65	
9	Giravanz Kitakyushu	42	19	7	16	53	47	+6	64	
10	Montedio Yamagata	42	16	13	13	51	49	+2	61	
11	Tochigi SC	42	17	9	16	50	49	+1	60	
12	Matsumoto Yamaga	42	15	14	13	46	43	+3	59	
13	Mito HollyHock	42	15	11	16	47	49	−2	56	
14	Roasso Kumamoto	42	15	10	17	40	48	−8	55	
15	Tokushima Vortis	42	13	12	17	45	49	−4	51	
16	Ehime FC	42	12	14	16	47	46	+1	50	
17	Thespa Kusatsu	42	12	11	19	31	45	−14	47	
18	Avispa Fukuoka	42	9	14	19	53	68	−15	41	
19	Kataller Toyama	42	9	11	22	38	59	−21	38	
20	Gainare Tottori	42	11	5	26	33	78	−45	38	
21	FC Gifu	42	7	14	21	27	55	−28	35	
22	Machida Zelvia (R)	42	7	11	24	34	67	−33	32	Relegation to 2013 Japan Football League (Note: The promotion and relegation between J2 and JFL will take place only if more than one promotion-eligible (i.e. having a J.League Associate Membership) JFL team finished above second place and playoff will be played only if a eligible JFL team finished in second place (See the corresponding section for further details). As only 2012 Japan Football League Champion V-Varen Nagasaki has the Associate Membership among the top 2 teams. Machida Zelvia was relegated immediately but no relegation/playoff was taken place for FC Gifu which finished 21st.)

Updated to match(es) played on 11 November 2012. Source: J.League Division 2
Rules for classification: 1st points; 2nd goal differential; 3rd goals scored; 4th head-to-head results; 5th disciplinary points; 6th draw. If two clubs are tied for first place, both clubs will be declared champions.
(C) Champions; (O) Play-off winners; (P) Promoted; (R) Relegated

=== Japan Football League ===
Although Arte Takasaki withdrew from the league due to economic problems, the JFL decided to go with a 17-team format. V-Varen Nagasaki won the tournament, joining the professional ranks automatically.

Sagawa Shiga withdrew after the league following parent company Sagawa Express's decision to close the team, leaving Tochigi Uva to playout against the Regional League promotion series third place.

Pos	Team	Pld	W	D	L	GF	GA	GD	Pts	Promotion or relegation
1	V-Varen Nagasaki (Note: V-Varen Nagasaki topped the table at the end of the 17th round and thus were awarded JFL seed for 2012 Emperor's Cup.) (C, P)	32	20	7	5	57	24	+33	67	Promotion to 2013 J.League Division 2
2	Nagano Parceiro	32	17	7	8	57	34	+23	58	
3	Sagawa Shiga (R)	32	16	9	7	61	37	+24	57	Withdrawn (Note: On 21 October Sagawa Express Co., the owner and operator of Sagawa Shiga FC, have announced that after the season the club will withdraw from JFL and cease its operations.)
4	Kamatamare Sanuki	32	15	8	9	49	29	+20	53	
5	Honda FC	32	16	5	11	55	39	+16	53	
6	YSCC Yokohama	32	15	4	13	58	50	+8	49	
7	SP Kyoto	32	12	9	11	43	43	0	45	
8	MIO Biwako Shiga	32	11	10	11	53	52	+1	43	
9	FC Ryukyu	32	12	7	13	58	62	−4	43	
10	Yokogawa Musashino	32	11	8	13	35	50	−15	41	
11	Fujieda MYFC	32	11	7	14	39	48	−9	40	
12	Sony Sendai	32	9	12	11	27	29	−2	39	
13	Blaublitz Akita	32	9	10	13	33	41	−8	37	
14	Zweigen Kanazawa	32	8	12	12	33	41	−8	36	
15	Hoyo Oita	32	9	8	15	40	57	−17	35	
16	Honda Lock	32	7	7	18	28	56	−28	28	
17	Tochigi Uva (O)	32	4	10	18	36	70	−34	22	Qualification for pro/rel playoffs

Updated to match(es) played on 18 November 2012. Source: Japan Football League
Rules for classification: 1st points; 2nd goal differential; 3rd goals scored; 4th head-to-head results; 5th disciplinary points; 6th draw.
(C) Champions; (O) Play-off winners; (P) Promoted; (R) Relegated

=== Japanese Regional Leagues ===
Kantō champions SC Sagamihara and Tōhoku champions Fukushima United won first and second place in the Regional League promotion series, thus being promoted automatically, while Hokkaidō champions Norbritz Hokkaido battled in the playout against Tochigi Uva but lost.

== Domestic cups ==
=== Emperor's Cup ===
1 January 2013
14:05

Gamba Osaka	0–1	Kashiwa Reysol
		Watanabe 35'

National Olympic Stadium, Shinjuku, Tokyo
Attendance: 46,480
Referee: (Japan) Toshimitsu Yoshida

=== J. League Cup ===
3 November 2012
13:05 JST (UTC+9)

Shimizu S-Pulse	1–2 (a.e.t.)	Kashima Antlers
Omae 77' (pen.)	Report	Shibasaki 73' (pen.), 93'

National Olympic Stadium, Shinjuku, Tokyo
Attendance: 45,228
Referee: (Japan) Masaaki Iemoto

=== Japanese Super Cup ===
3 March 2012
13:35 JST (UTC+9)

Kashiwa Reysol	2–1	FC Tokyo
Wagner 27'; Leandro 45' (pen.)	Report	64' Aria

National Olympic Stadium, Tokyo
Attendance: 35,453
Referee: (Japan) Yuichi Nishimura

== International club competitions ==
=== Suruga Bank Championship ===
1 August 2012
19:00 JST (UTC+9)

Kashima Antlers (Japan)	2–2	Universidad de Chile
Iwamasa 18'; Renato 27'	Summary	Iwamasa 40' (o.g.); Aránguiz 73' (pen.)
Penalties
Juninho (penalty scored); Koroki (penalty scored); Sogahata (penalty scored); Endo (penalty scored); Motoyama (penalty scored); Araiba (penalty scored); Nishi (penalty scored)	7–6	(penalty scored) Aránguiz; (penalty scored) Rodríguez; (penalty scored) Lorenzetti; (penalty scored) Cereceda; (penalty scored) Marino; (penalty scored) Herrera; (penalty missed) Castro

Kashima Soccer Stadium, Kashima
Attendance: 20,021
Referee: Chris Beath (Australia)

=== FIFA Club World Cup ===
Will take place between 6 and 16 December 2012. Since the tournament is hosted in Japan the winners of the J. League will be invited to take part. If the AFC Champions League winner is from Japan, then the highest placed non-Japanese team of the AFC Champions League will be invited in place of the J. League winner.

== National team (Men) ==
=== Results ===
23 February 2012 International Friendly (2012 Kirin Cup)	Japan	3–1	Iceland	Osaka, Japan
19:20 JST (UTC+9)	Maeda 2'; Fujimoto 53'; Makino 79'	[ JFA] Summary	Smárason 90+3' (pen.)	Stadium: Nagai Stadium; Attendance: 42,579; Referee: Chris Beath (Australia)

29 February 2012 2014 World Cup Qualifier	Japan	0–1	Uzbekistan	Aichi, Japan
19:30 JST (UTC+9)		Report; Summary	Shadrin 54'	Stadium: Toyota Stadium; Attendance: 42,720; Referee: Abdullah Balideh (Qatar)

23 May 2012 International Friendly (2012 Kirin Cup)	Japan	2–0	Azerbaijan	Fukuroi, Japan
19:15 JST (UTC+9)	Kagawa 43'; Nabiyev 58' (o.g.)	[ JFA] Summary		Stadium: Shizuoka Stadium; Attendance: 35,000; Referee: Malik Abdul Bashir (Singapore)

3 June 2012 2014 World Cup Qualifier	Japan	3–0	Oman	Saitama, Japan
19:30 JST (UTC+9)	Honda 11'; Maeda 51'; Okazaki 54'	JFA Report		Stadium: Saitama Stadium 2002; Attendance: 63,551; Referee: Ravshan Irmatov (Uzbekistan)

8 June 2012 2014 World Cup Qualifier	Japan	6–0	Jordan	Saitama, Japan
19:30 JST (UTC+9)	Maeda 19'; Honda 22', 31', 54' (pen.); Kagawa 34'; Kurihara 90'	Report	Deeb (yellow card) 25' (yellow-red card) 27'	Stadium: Saitama Stadium 2002; Attendance: 60,874; Referee: Kim Dong Jin (Korea Republic)

12 June 2012 2014 World Cup Qualifier	Australia	1–1	Japan	Brisbane, Australia
19:00 JST (UTC+9)	Milligan (yellow card) 25' (yellow-red card) 55'; Wilkshire 69' (pen.)	Report	Kurihara 64'; Kurihara (yellow card) 23' (yellow-red card) 89'	Stadium: Suncorp Stadium; Attendance: 40,189; Referee: Khalil Al Ghamdi (Saudi Arabia)

15 August 2012 International Friendly (2012 Kirin Cup)	Japan	1–1	Venezuela	Hokkaidō, Japan
19:30 JST (UTC+9)	Endō 15'	Summary	Miku 62'	Stadium: Sapporo Dome; Attendance: 39,396; Referee: Min-Hu Lee (Korea Republic)

7 September 2012 International Friendly (2012 Kirin Cup)	Japan	1–0	United Arab Emirates	Niigata, Japan
19:20 JST (UTC+9)	Havenaar 69'	Summary		Stadium: Tohoku Denryoku Big Swan Stadium; Attendance: 42,020; Referee: Mingyu Ma (China PR)

11 September 2012 2014 World Cup Qualifier	Japan	1–0	Iraq	Saitama, Japan
19:34 JST (UTC+9)	Maeda 25'	Report		Stadium: Saitama Stadium 2002; Referee: Malik Abdul Bashir (Singapore)

13 October 2012 International Friendly	France	0–1	Japan	Saint-Denis, France
04:00 JST (UTC+9)		Summary	Hasebe (yellow card) 34'; Kagawa 88'	Stadium: Stade de France; Attendance: 55,000; Referee: William Collum (Scotland)

16 October 2012 International Friendly	Japan	0–4	Brazil	Wrocław, Poland
21:10 JST (UTC+9)		Summary	Paulinho 12'; Neymar 25' (pen.), 48'; Kaká 76'	Stadium: Municipal Stadium; Referee: Marcin Borski (Poland)

14 November 2012 2014 World Cup Qualifier	Oman	1–2	Japan	Muscat Oman
20:30 JST (UTC+9)	Ahmed Mubarak 77'	Summary	Kiyotake 20'; Okazaki 89'	Stadium: Sultan Qaboos Sports Complex; Referee: Abdullah Balideh (Qatar)

=== Players statistics ===
Player	-2011	02.24	02.29	05.23	06.03	06.08	06.12	08.15	09.06	09.11	10.12	10.16	11.14	2012	Total
Yasuhito Endo	113(9)	O	O	-	O	O	O	O(1)	O	O	O	O	O	11(1)	124(10)
Yuichi Komano	67(1)	O	O	-	-	-	-	O	O	O	-	-	-	5(0)	72(1)
Kengo Nakamura	56(6)	O	-	O	-	O	-	O	O	-	O	O	-	7(0)	63(6)
Yasuyuki Konno	55(1)	O	O	-	O	O	O	-	-	-	O	O	O	8(0)	63(1)
Yoshito Okubo	53(5)	O	-	-	-	-	-	-	-	-	-	-	-	1(0)	54(5)
Makoto Hasebe	52(2)	-	O	O	O	O	O	O	O	O	O	O	O	11(0)	63(2)
Shinji Okazaki	49(26)	-	O	O(1)	O(1)	O	O	O	O	O	-	-	O(1)	9(3)	58(29)
Atsuto Uchida	45(1)	-	O	O	O	O	O	-	-	-	O	O	-	7(0)	52(1)
Yuto Nagatomo	44(3)	-	O	O	O	O	O	O	-	O	O	O	O	10(0)	54(3)
Keisuke Honda	31(8)	-	-	O	O(1)	O(3)	O	O	O	O	-	O	O	9(4)	40(12)
Shinji Kagawa	28(9)	-	O	O(1)	O	O(1)	O	O	O	-	O(1)	O	-	9(3)	37(12)
Eiji Kawashima	28(0)	-	O	O	O	O	O	O	O	O	O	O	O	11(0)	39(0)
Ryoichi Maeda	16(6)	O(1)	-	O	O(1)	O(1)	O	O	-	O(1)	-	-	O	8(4)	24(10)
Maya Yoshida	13(2)	-	O	-	O	O	-	O	O	O	O	O	O	9(0)	22(2)
Tadanari Lee	10(2)	-	O	-	-	-	-	-	-	-	-	-	-	1(0)	11(2)
Hajime Hosogai	10(1)	-	-	O	O	-	-	O	O	O	O	O	O	8(0)	18(1)
Jungo Fujimoto	10(0)	O(1)	O	-	-	-	-	O	-	-	-	-	-	3(1)	13(1)
Takayuki Morimoto	9(3)	-	-	O	-	-	-	-	-	-	-	-	-	1(0)	10(3)
Masahiko Inoha	9(1)	O	-	O	-	O	O	O	O	O	-	-	-	7(0)	16(1)
Yuzo Kurihara	8(0)	O	-	O	-	O(1)	O(1)	-	-	-	-	O	-	5(2)	13(2)
Tomoaki Makino	8(0)	O(1)	-	O	-	-	-	O	-	-	-	-	-	3(1)	11(1)
Shusaku Nishikawa	7(0)	O	-	-	-	-	-	-	-	-	-	-	-	1(0)	8(0)
Mike Havenaar	5(2)	-	O	-	-	-	-	-	O(1)	O	O	-	-	4(1)	9(3)
Hiroshi Kiyotake	5(0)	-	-	-	O	-	O	-	O	O	O	O	O(1)	7(1)	12(1)
Naohiro Ishikawa	5(0)	O	-	-	-	-	-	-	-	-	-	-	-	1(0)	6(0)
Takashi Inui	3(0)	-	O	-	-	-	-	-	-	-	O	O	-	3(0)	6(0)
Hiroki Mizumoto	3(0)	-	-	-	-	-	-	O	O	-	-	-	-	2(0)	5(0)
Yosuke Kashiwagi	3(0)	O	-	-	-	-	-	-	-	-	-	-	-	1(0)	4(0)
Ryota Moriwaki	1(0)	O	-	-	-	-	-	-	-	-	-	-	-	1(0)	2(0)
Hiroki Sakai	0(0)	-	-	O	O	-	O	-	O	-	O	O	O	7(0)	7(0)
Hideto Takahashi	0(0)	-	-	O	-	-	-	-	O	-	O	-	O	4(0)	4(0)
Ryo Miyaichi	0(0)	-	-	O	-	-	-	-	-	-	-	O	-	2(0)	2(0)
Gotoku Sakai	0(0)	-	-	-	-	-	-	-	O	-	-	-	O	2(0)	2(0)
Chikashi Masuda	0(0)	O	-	-	-	-	-	-	-	-	-	-	-	1(0)	1(0)
Junya Tanaka	0(0)	O	-	-	-	-	-	-	-	-	-	-	-	1(0)	1(0)
Naoya Kondo	0(0)	O	-	-	-	-	-	-	-	-	-	-	-	1(0)	1(0)

=== Goal scorers ===
Place	Position	Name	Friendlies	Kirin Cup	WC Qualifying	Total
1	MF	Keisuke Honda	0	0	4	4
1	FW	Ryoichi Maeda	0	1	3	4
3	MF	Shinji Kagawa	0	1	1	2
3	DF	Yuzo Kurihara	0	0	2	2
3	FW	Shinji Okazaki	0	0	2	2
6	MF	Jungo Fujimoto	0	1	0	1
6	DF	Tomoaki Makino	0	1	0	1
6	MF	Yasuhito Endō	0	1	0	1
6		Own goal	0	1	0	1
6	FW	Mike Havenaar	0	1	0	1
6	FW	Hiroshi Kiyotake	0	0	1	1
		TOTALS	1	6	13	20

== National team (Women) ==
=== Results ===
2012.02.29	Japan	2–1	Norway	Portugal
	Nagasato (?); Kawasumi (?)		? (?)

2012.03.02	Japan	2–0	Denmark	Portugal
	Sugasawa (?); Ono (?)

2012.03.05	Japan	1–0	United States	Portugal
	Takase (?)

2012.03.07	Japan	3–4	Germany	Portugal
	Kawasumi (?); Tanaka (?); Nagasato (?)		? (?) ? (?) ? (?) ? (?)

2012.04.01	Japan	1–1	United States	Miyagi, Japan
	Kinga (?)		? (?)	Stadium: Sendai Stadium

2012.04.05	Japan	4–1	Brazil	Hyogo, Japan
	(?); Nagasato (?); Miyama (?); Sugasawa (?)		? (?)	Stadium: Kobe Wing Stadium

2012.06.18	Japan	1–4	United States	Sweden
	Nagasato (?)		? (?) ? (?) ? (?) ? (?)

2012.06.20	Japan	1–0	Sweden	Sweden
	Nagasato (?)

2012.07.11	Japan	3–0	Australia	Tokyo, Japan
	Miyama (?); Ogimi (?); Sawa (?)			Stadium: National Stadium

2012.07.19	Japan	0–2	France	France
			? (?) ? (?)

2012.07.25	Japan	2–1	Canada	England
	Kawasumi (?); Miyama (?)		? (?)

2012.07.28	Japan	0–0	Sweden	England

2012.07.31	Japan	0–0	South Africa	Wales

2012.08.03	Japan	2–0	Brazil	Wales
	Ogimi (?); Ono (?)

2012.08.06	Japan	2–1	France	England
	Ogimi (?); Sakaguchi (?)		? (?)

2012.08.09	Japan	1–2	United States	England
	Ogimi (?)		? (?) ? (?)

=== Players statistics ===
Player	-2011	02.29	03.02	03.05	03.07	04.01	04.05	06.18	06.20	07.11	07.19	07.25	07.28	07.31	08.03	08.06	08.09	2012	Total
Homare Sawa	177(80)	O	-	-	-	-	-	O	O	O(1)	O	O	O	-	O	O	O	10(1)	187(81)
Aya Miyama	104(26)	O	O	O	O	O	O(1)	O	O	O(1)	O	O(1)	O	O	O	O	O	16(3)	120(29)
Shinobu Ono	97(36)	O	O(1)	O	O	O	O	O	O	O	O	O	O	-	O(1)	O	O	15(2)	112(38)
Kozue Ando	97(17)	-	-	O	O	O	O	O	O	O	O	O	O	O	O	O	-	13(0)	110(17)
Yuki Ogimi	75(32)	O(1)	O	O	O(1)	O	O(1)	O(1)	O(1)	O(1)	O	O	O	O	O(1)	O(1)	O(1)	16(9)	91(41)
Azusa Iwashimizu	74(8)	-	O	O	O	-	-	-	-	O	O	O	O	O	O	O	O	11(0)	85(8)
Yukari Kinga	72(4)	O	O	O	O	O(1)	O	O	-	O	O	O	O	O	O	O	O	15(1)	87(5)
Kyoko Yano	69(1)	-	-	-	-	O	O	O	-	O	-	-	-	O	-	-	-	5(0)	74(1)
Karina Maruyama	68(14)	-	-	-	-	-	-	O	O	O	-	-	-	O	-	-	O	5(0)	73(14)
Miho Fukumoto	56(0)	-	O	O	-	-	O	-	O	O	O	O	O	-	O	O	O	11(0)	67(0)
Mizuho Sakaguchi	47(16)	O	-	O	O	O	-	O	O	O	O	O	O	O	O	O(1)	O	14(1)	61(17)
Rumi Utsugi	47(5)	O	O	O	O	O	O	O	-	-	-	-	-	-	-	-	-	7(0)	54(5)
Aya Sameshima	38(2)	O	-	O	O	O	O	O	O	O	O	O	O	-	O	O	O	14(0)	52(2)
Saki Kumagai	33(0)	O	O	O	O	O	O	O	O	O	O	O	O	O	O	O	O	16(0)	49(0)
Ayumi Kaihori	27(0)	O	-	-	O	O	-	O	-	O	O	-	-	O	-	-	-	7(0)	34(0)
Nahomi Kawasumi	23(6)	O(1)	O	O	O(1)	O	O	O	O	O	O	O(1)	O	O	O	O	O	16(3)	39(9)
Megumi Takase	19(4)	O	O	O(1)	O	-	O	O	O	O	-	-	-	O	O	-	-	10(1)	29(5)
Megumi Kamionobe	17(2)	-	-	-	-	-	-	-	O	-	-	-	-	-	-	-	-	1(0)	18(2)
Mana Iwabuchi	11(2)	-	-	-	-	-	-	-	-	-	O	-	O	O	-	-	O	4(0)	15(2)
Kanako Ito	10(3)	O	O	O	-	-	-	-	-	-	-	-	-	-	-	-	-	3(0)	13(3)
Manami Nakano	10(2)	-	-	-	-	-	O	-	-	-	-	-	-	-	-	-	-	1(0)	11(2)
Asuna Tanaka	6(2)	O	O	O	O(1)	O	O	O	O	O	-	-	O	O	-	O	O	13(1)	19(3)
Yuika Sugasawa	6(0)	-	O(1)	O	-	O	O(1)	-	-	-	-	-	-	-	-	-	-	4(2)	10(2)
Nanase Kiryu	3(0)	-	O	-	O	-	-	-	-	-	-	-	-	-	-	-	-	2(0)	5(0)
Kana Osafune	3(0)	-	-	-	-	-	O	-	-	-	-	-	-	-	-	-	-	1(0)	4(0)
Saori Ariyoshi	0(0)	O	O	-	O	O	-	-	O	-	-	-	-	-	-	-	-	5(0)	5(0)
Mai Kyokawa	0(0)	O	O	-	-	-	-	-	-	-	-	-	-	-	-	-	-	2(0)	2(0)
Yumi Uetsuji	0(0)	-	-	-	-	-	O	-	-	-	-	-	-	-	-	-	-	1(0)	1(0)
Ami Otaki	0(0)	-	-	-	-	-	-	-	O	-	-	-	-	-	-	-	-	1(0)	1(0)
