= 2012 Recopa Sudamericana =

- Event: Recopa Sudamericana
Universidad de Chile	Santos
(Chile)	(Brazil)
0	2
- (on aggregate; Santos won on points 4–1)

First leg
Universidad de Chile	Santos
0	0
- Date: August 22, 2012
- Venue: Estadio Nacional, Santiago
- Referee: Néstor Pitana (Argentina)

Second leg
Santos	Universidad de Chile
2	0
- Date: September 26, 2012
- Venue: Estádio do Pacaembu, São Paulo
- Referee: Martín Vázquez (Uruguay)

The 2012 Recopa Sudamericana (officially the 2012 Recopa Santander Sudamericana for sponsorship reasons) was the 20th edition of the Recopa Sudamericana, the football competition organized by CONMEBOL between the winners of the previous season's two major South American club tournaments, the Copa Libertadores and the Copa Sudamericana. It was contested between Brazilian club Santos, the 2011 Copa Libertadores champion, and Chilean club Universidad de Chile, the 2011 Copa Sudamericana champion.

After a goalless first leg, Santos was crowned champions after their 2–0 victory in the second leg. Neymar of Santos was selected as the player of the 2012 Recopa Sudamericana.

== Rules ==
The Recopa Sudamericana was played over two legs; home and away. The team that qualified via the Copa Libertadores played the second leg at home. The team that accumulated the most points —three for a win, one for a draw, zero for a loss— after the two legs was crowned the champion. In case of the two teams tied on points after the second leg, the team with the best goal difference won. If the two teams had equal goal difference, the away goals rule was not applied. Extra time was played, which consisted of two 15-minute halves. If the tie was still not broken, a penalty shootout ensued according to the Laws of the Game.

== Qualified teams ==
Team	Qualification	Previous app.
(Brazil) Santos	2011 Copa Libertadores champion	None
Universidad de Chile	2011 Copa Sudamericana champion	None

Bold indicates winning years

== Venues ==
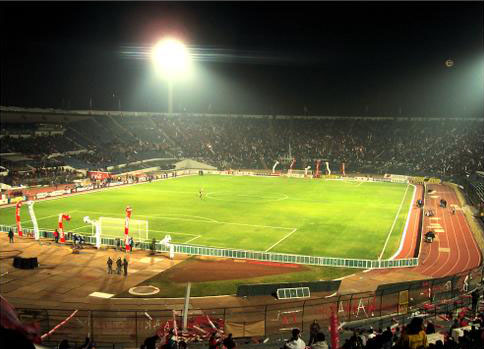
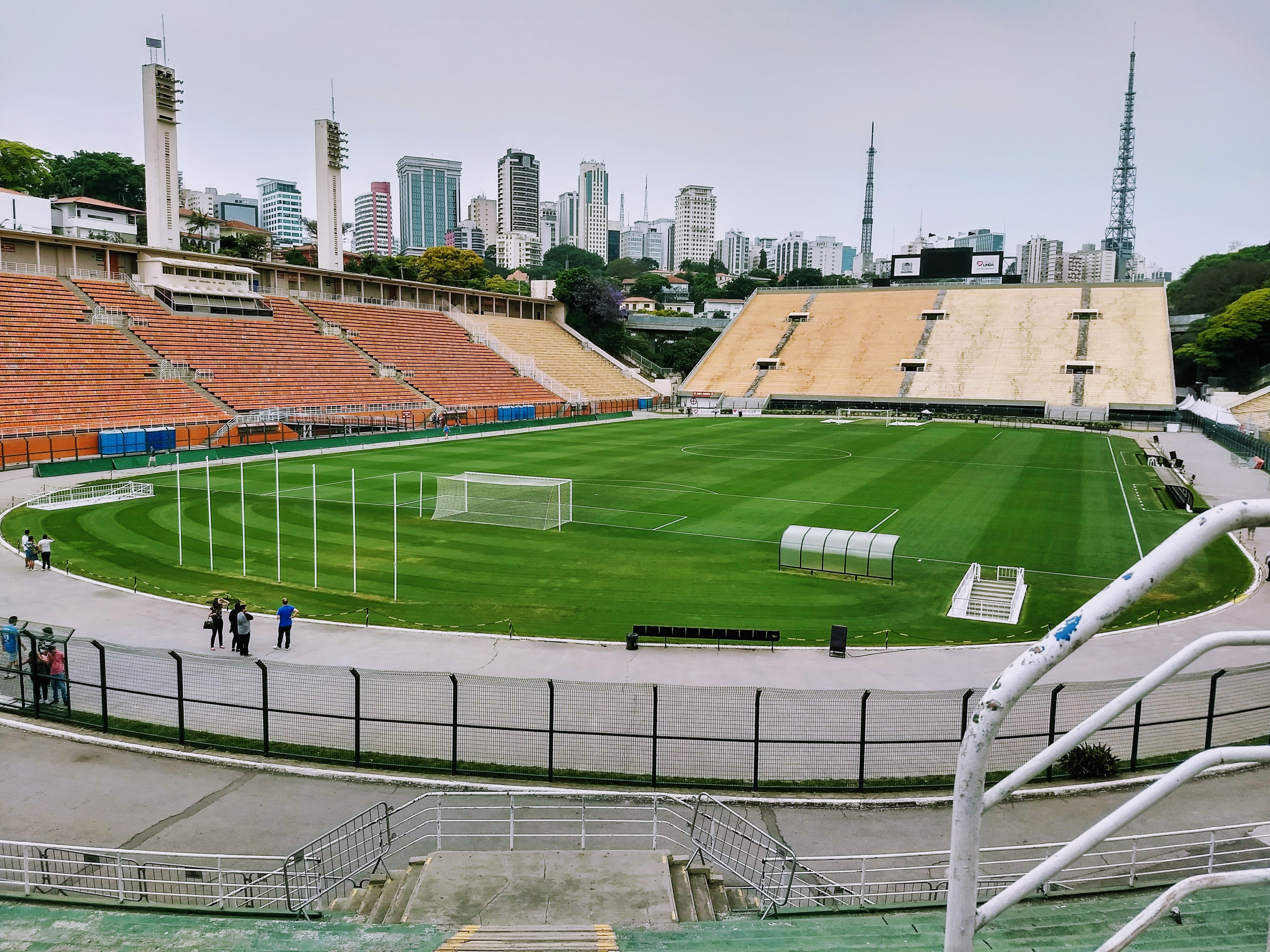
Estadio Nacional (left) and Estadio do Pacaembu, venues

== Match details ==
=== First leg ===
2012 Recopa Sudamericana
August 22, 2012
21:00 UTC−04:00
First leg

Universidad de Chile	0–0	(Brazil) Santos
	Report

Estadio Nacional, Santiago
Attendance: 35,000
Referee: Néstor Pitana (Argentina)

**Universidad de Chile**	**Santos**

GK	25	(Chile) Johnny Herrera
DF	5	(Chile) Albert Acevedo (c)
DF	23	(Chile) Sebastián Martínez
DF	13	(Chile) José Manuel Rojas
DF	3	(Chile) Eugenio Mena
MF	6	(Argentina) Matías Rodríguez		(substituted off) 78'
MF	20	(Chile) Charles Aránguiz
MF	8	(Argentina) Guillermo Marino		(substituted off) 80'
MF	15	(Chile) Roberto Cereceda	(yellow card) 1'
MF	22	(Argentina) Gustavo Lorenzetti	(yellow card) 54'
FW	9	(Argentina) Enzo Gutiérrez
Substitutes:
GK	12	(Chile) Paulo Garcés
DF	21	(Ecuador) Eduardo Morante
DF	14	(Chile) Paulo Magalhaes
DF	24	(Chile) Igor Lichnovsky
MF	2	(Argentina) Ezequiel Videla		(substituted on) 80'
FW	16	(Chile) Francisco Castro
FW	18	(Chile) Christian Bravo		(substituted on) 78'
Manager:
(Argentina) Jorge Sampaoli

GK	1	(Brazil) Rafael Cabral
DF	4	(Brazil) Bruno Peres
DF	2	(Brazil) Bruno Rodrigo
DF	6	(Brazil) Durval (c)
DF	16	(Brazil) Juan
MF	15	(Brazil) Adriano
MF	5	(Brazil) Arouca	(yellow card) 10'
MF	10	(Brazil) Ganso	(yellow card) 27'
MF	17	(Argentina) Patricio Rodríguez		(substituted off) 87'
FW	9	(Brazil) André		(substituted off) 64'
CF	11	(Brazil) Neymar
Substitutes:
GK	12	(Brazil) Aranha
DF	13	(Brazil) David Braz
DF	21	(Brazil) Douglas
MF	22	(Brazil) Gérson Magrão
MF	8	(Brazil) Felipe Anderson		(substituted on) 87'
FW	20	(Argentina) Ezequiel Miralles		(substituted on) 64'
FW	19	(Brazil) Bill
Manager:
(Brazil) Muricy Ramalho

Assistant referees:
Ricardo Casas (Argentina)
Hernán Maidana (Argentina)
Fourth official:
Germán Delfino (Argentina)

=== Second leg ===
September 26, 2012
19:00 UTC−03:00
Second leg

Santos (Brazil)	2–0	Universidad de Chile
Neymar 27'; Bruno Rodrigo 60'	Report

Estádio do Pacaembu, São Paulo
Attendance: 24,000
Referee: Martín Vázquez (Uruguay)

**Santos**	**Universidad de Chile**

GK	1	(Brazil) Rafael Cabral
DF	4	(Brazil) Bruno Peres		(substituted off) 70'
DF	2	(Brazil) Bruno Rodrigo
DF	6	(Brazil) Durval (c)	(yellow card) 76'
DF	3	(Brazil) Léo		(substituted off) 52'
MF	15	(Brazil) Adriano	(yellow card) 18'
MF	5	(Brazil) Arouca
MF	8	(Brazil) Felipe Anderson
MF	17	(Argentina) Patricio Rodríguez		(substituted off) 85'
FW	9	(Brazil) André
FW	11	(Brazil) Neymar
Substitutes:
GK	24	(Brazil) Vladimir
DF	13	(Brazil) David Braz
DF	21	(Brazil) Douglas
MF	22	(Brazil) Gérson Magrão		(substituted on) 52'
MF	14	(Brazil) Ewerton Páscoa		(substituted on) 70'
FW	20	(Argentina) Ezequiel Miralles		(substituted on) 85'
FW	19	(Brazil) Bill
Manager:
(Brazil) Muricy Ramalho

GK	25	(Chile) Johnny Herrera
DF	5	(Chile) Albert Acevedo (c)		(substituted off) 51'
DF	4	(Chile) Osvaldo González	(yellow card) 60'
DF	13	(Chile) José Manuel Rojas
DF	3	(Chile) Eugenio Mena
MF	6	(Argentina) Matías Rodríguez		(substituted off) 46'
MF	23	(Chile) Sebastián Martínez	(yellow card) 56'
MF	20	(Chile) Charles Aránguiz		(substituted off) 46'
MF	22	(Argentina) Gustavo Lorenzetti	(yellow card) 88'
FW	19	(Chile) Sebastián Ubilla	(yellow card) 54'
FW	9	(Argentina) Enzo Gutiérrez
Substitutes:
GK	12	(Chile) Paulo Garcés
DF	14	(Chile) Paulo Magalhaes		(substituted on) 51'
DF	24	(Chile) Igor Lichnovsky
MF	2	(Argentina) Ezequiel Videla
MF	8	(Argentina) Guillermo Marino		(substituted on) 46'
MF	15	(Chile) Roberto Cereceda
FW	16	(Chile) Francisco Castro		(substituted on) 46'
Manager:
(Argentina) Jorge Sampaoli

Assistant referees:
Mauricio Espinosa (Uruguay)
Miguel Nievas (Uruguay)
Fourth official:
Daniel Fedorczuk (Uruguay)
