= Kalé (footballer) =

Brazilian footballer (1947–2025)

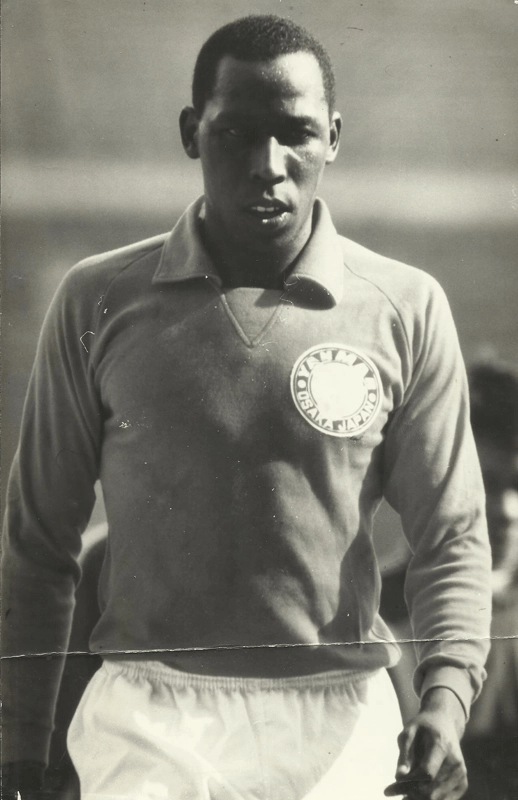
- Kalé in 1971

Personal information
- Full name: Dorival Carlos Esteves
- Date of birth: 5 March 1947
- Place of birth: Botucatu, São Paulo, Brazil
- Date of death: 26 January 2020 (aged 72)
- Place of death: São Paulo, São Paulo, Brazil
- Position: Right-back

Youth career
- ???–1961: Ferroviária

Senior career*
Years	Team	Apps	(Gls)
1962–1966	Ferroviária		
1967–1968	Juventus		
1967	→ São Caetano (loan)		
1968–1973	Yanmar Diesel	52	(4)
- * Club domestic league appearances and goals

Dorival Carlos Esteves (5 March 1947 – 26 January 2020), better known as simply Kalé was a Brazilian footballer. He was known for his career as a right-back for Yanmar Diesel throughout the early 1970s, contributing to the club's victory at the 1971 Japan Soccer League. He was also known for being the second ever foreign player to play in the newly founded Japan Soccer League as well as being the first black player to play in the league.

== Career ==
Throughout his youth career, Kalé played for Ferroviária. He was later made a professional for the senior squad at the age of 15 following the departure of Zé Maria for Portuguesa. He then played for Juventus alongside players such as Mão de Onça, Milton Buzetto and Pando. That same season however, he was loaned out to São Caetano. He had planned to continue the 1968 season with Juventus but his talents attracted the attention of the Brazilian branch of Japanese club Yanmar Diesel and was soon invited to join the club in Osaka by the recommendation of representative Vicente Hayashida. By the time of his arrival, he played alongside other players such as Kunishige Kamamoto and fellow Brazilian footballer Nelson Yoshimura with George Kobayashi playing with him later on. He gained recognition for being one of the first foreign players in the Japan Soccer League and would go on to gain success in Japan as he was part of the winning squad for the 1970 Emperor's Cup and the 1971 Japan Soccer League. He was also named twice in the 1971 and 1972 editions of the Japan Soccer League Best Eleven. He retired in 1973 following the expiration of his contract.

== Personal life ==
He was given his nickname as he bore a strong resemblance to Brazilian international Pelé whom he notably later met in 1972 following a friendly between Santos and Japan.

Following his retirement from professional football, he returned to Brazil and served as a manager for several amateur clubs there. In 1990, he returned to Japan and had been serving as an interpreter for a company based in Kanagawa despite briefly returning to Brazil following the Kobe earthquake in 1995. He continued to work in various football schools for young boys in Japan until 2005 when he returned to Brazil again, working for a transportation company in the neighborhood of Americana in São Paulo.

Describing his experience in Japan, he had nothing but positive experiences as despite having to learn Japanese with help from Yoshimura, people had often stopped by the street to greet and converse with him as foreign footballers were still a relatively new phenomenon, uniquely not being subjected to racial abuse unlike other Brazilian footballers. Before his death, he was already fluent in the language.

Kalé was married twice and had four children: Marcos, Márcia, Karina and Cibele as well as having a grandson through his son Marcos who also played as a volleyball player.

He died on 26 January 2020 following a battle with an undisclosed illness.
