= Brazil at the 2014 FIFA World Cup =

Matches of the Brazil national football team in the 2014 FIFA World Cup

The following article concerns the performance of Brazil at the 2014 FIFA World Cup. They played their first home-soil World Cup after 64 years, since the 1950 World Cup, and thus were automatically qualified for the group stage.

Brazil qualified as first at their group, winning two matches (Croatia and Cameroon) and drawing one (Mexico).

They eventually reached the semi-finals, beating Chile and Colombia. Brazil, however, were then knocked out by the eventual champions Germany in a match known as the Mineirazo. In the match for third place, Brazil lost to Netherlands and therefore ended the tournament in fourth place.

== Host selection ==
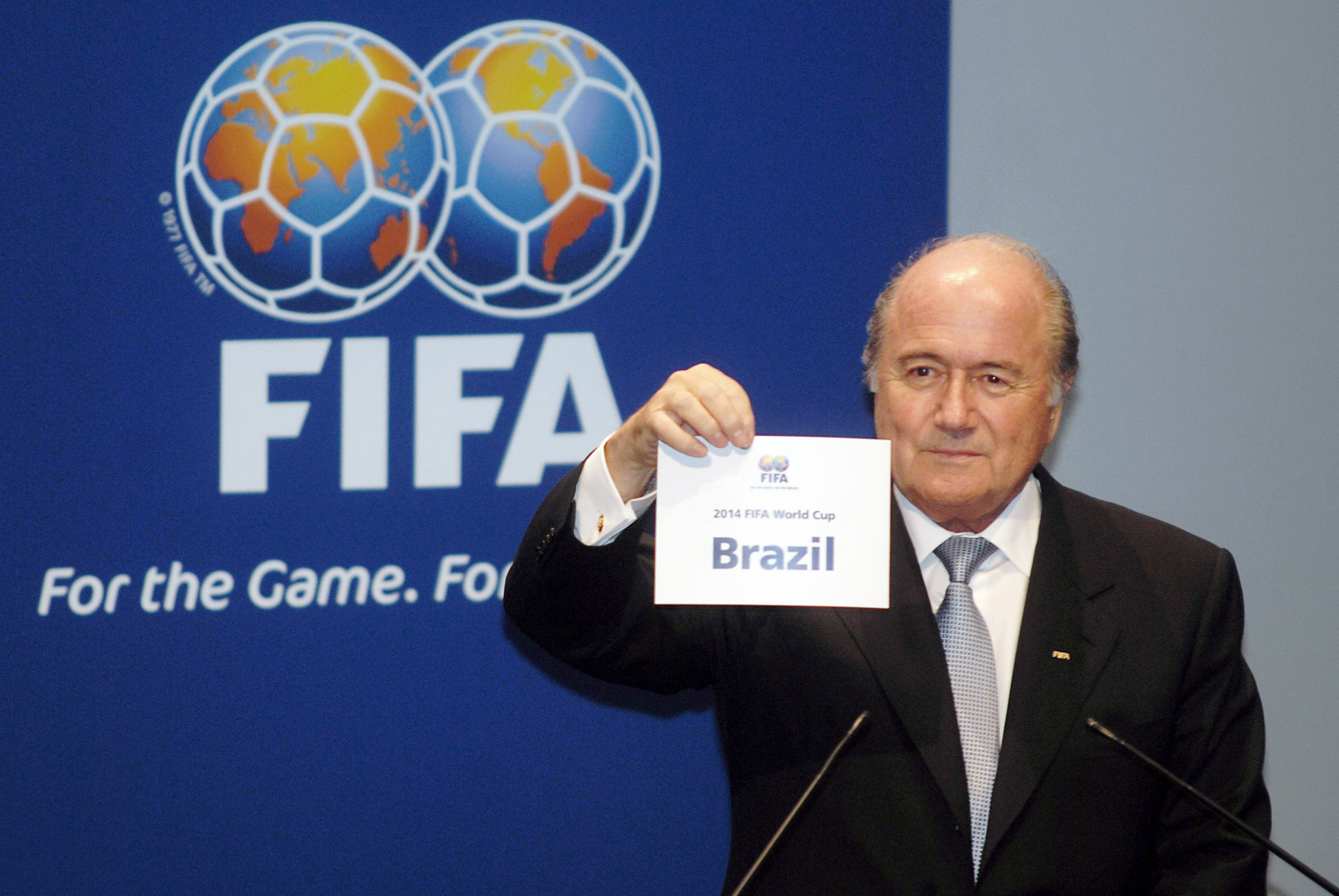
Announcing of Brazil as hosts, 2007

In March 2003, FIFA announced that the tournament would be held in South America for the first time since 1978, in line with its then-active policy of rotating the right to host the World Cup among different confederations. The decision meant that it would be the first time that two consecutive World Cups were staged outside Europe and the first time two consecutive World Cups were held in the Southern Hemisphere (the 2010 edition was held in South Africa). Only Brazil and Colombia formally declared their candidacy but, after the withdrawal of the latter from the process, Brazil was officially elected as host nation unopposed on 30 October 2007.

== Pre-tournament friendlies ==
June 3, 2014 Friendly	Brazil	4–0	Panama	Goiânia, Brazil
	Neymar 26'; Alves 40'; Hulk 46'; Willian 73'	Report		Stadium: Estádio Serra Dourada; Attendance: 20,000; Referee: Raúl Orosco (Bolivia)

June 6, 2014 Friendly	Brazil	1–0	Serbia	São Paulo, Brazil
	Fred 58'	Report		Stadium: Estádio do Morumbi; Attendance: 67,042; Referee: Enrique Cáceres (Paraguay)

== Squad ==
Coach: Luiz Felipe Scolari

The final squad was announced on 7 May 2014. The squad numbers were revealed on 2 June. Neymar suffered a fractured vertebra following a foul by Colombia defender Juan Camilo Zúñiga in the quarter-final; it was announced that Neymar would miss the remainder of the tournament.

No.	Pos.	Player	Date of birth (age)	Caps	Club
1	GK	Jefferson	2 January 1983 (aged 31)	9	(Brazil) Botafogo
2	DF	Dani Alves	6 May 1983 (aged 31)	75	(Spain) Barcelona
3	DF	Thiago Silva (c)	22 September 1984 (aged 29)	46	(France) Paris Saint-Germain
4	DF	David Luiz	22 April 1987 (aged 27)	36	(England) Chelsea
5	MF	Fernandinho	4 May 1985 (aged 29)	7	(England) Manchester City
6	DF	Marcelo	12 May 1988 (aged 26)	31	(Spain) Real Madrid
7	FW	Hulk	25 July 1986 (aged 27)	35	(Russia) Zenit Saint Petersburg
8	MF	Paulinho	25 July 1988 (aged 25)	26	(England) Tottenham Hotspur
9	FW	Fred	3 October 1983 (aged 30)	33	(Brazil) Fluminense
10	FW	Neymar	5 February 1992 (aged 22)	49	(Spain) Barcelona
11	MF	Oscar	9 September 1991 (aged 22)	31	(England) Chelsea
12	GK	Júlio César	3 September 1979 (aged 34)	80	(Canada) Toronto FC
13	DF	Dante	18 October 1983 (aged 30)	12	(Germany) Bayern Munich
14	DF	Maxwell	27 August 1981 (aged 32)	9	(France) Paris Saint-Germain
15	DF	Henrique	14 October 1986 (aged 27)	5	(Italy) Napoli
16	MF	Ramires	24 March 1987 (aged 27)	42	(England) Chelsea
17	MF	Luiz Gustavo	23 July 1987 (aged 26)	19	(Germany) VfL Wolfsburg
18	MF	Hernanes	29 May 1985 (aged 29)	24	(Italy) Internazionale
19	MF	Willian	9 August 1988 (aged 25)	7	(England) Chelsea
20	FW	Bernard	8 September 1992 (aged 21)	11	(Ukraine) Shakhtar Donetsk
21	FW	Jô	20 March 1987 (aged 27)	17	(Brazil) Atlético Mineiro
22	GK	Victor	21 January 1983 (aged 31)	6	(Brazil) Atlético Mineiro
23	DF	Maicon	26 July 1981 (aged 32)	72	(Italy) Roma

== Group stage ==
=== Brazil vs Croatia ===
The two teams had met in two previous matches, including in the 2006 World Cup group stage, won by Brazil 1–0. Croatia forward Mario Mandžukić was suspended for the match, after being sent off in the team's final qualifier against Iceland.

Croatia opened the scoring through a Marcelo own goal, as the ball bounced off him into the net after Nikica Jelavić deflected Ivica Olić's cross. Neymar equalised for the hosts with a 25-yard (23 m) shot after receiving a pass from Oscar. In the second half, Brazil took the lead with Neymar's penalty after Dejan Lovren was judged to have fouled Fred in the penalty area. Croatia had a potential equaliser disallowed, after a foul was called on the Brazilian goalkeeper, Júlio César. In added time, Oscar sealed the win, toe-poking the third goal for Brazil from 22 yards (20 m) after receiving a pass from Ramires.

Post-match, FIFA referees chief, Massimo Busacca, defended the officials for awarding the penalty, and insisted there had been some contact between Lovren and Fred even if it was minimal. On the other hand, renowned former top-level FIFA referee Markus Merk criticised FIFA for having Yuichi Nishimura as the referee in the opening match, labelling the refereeing in the match as "embarrassing".

The game was notable for a number of pioneering events. This was the first occasion in FIFA World Cup history on which an own goal (which was also the first ever own goal scored by Brazil in World Cup finals) opened scoring in the tournament. As the first game played at this World Cup, the match also saw the first use of vanishing spray to mark free kick spots, and the advent of goal-line technology, two innovations introduced during the tournament.

12 June 2014
17:00 UTC−3

Brazil	3–1	Croatia
Neymar 29', 71' (pen.); Oscar 90+1'	Report	Marcelo 11' (o.g.)

Arena de São Paulo, São Paulo
Attendance: 62,103
Referee: Yuichi Nishimura (Japan)

Brazil	Croatia

GK	12	Júlio César
RB	2	Dani Alves
CB	3	Thiago Silva (c)
CB	4	David Luiz
LB	6	Marcelo
DM	8	Paulinho		(substituted off) 63'
DM	17	Luiz Gustavo	(yellow card) 88'
RW	7	Hulk		(substituted off) 68'
AM	11	Oscar
LW	10	Neymar	(yellow card) 27'	(substituted off) 88'
CF	9	Fred
Substitutions:
MF	18	Hernanes		(substituted on) 63'
MF	20	Bernard		(substituted on) 68'
MF	16	Ramires		(substituted on) 88'
Manager:
Luiz Felipe Scolari

GK	1	Stipe Pletikosa
RB	11	Darijo Srna (c)
CB	5	Vedran Ćorluka	(yellow card) 65'
CB	6	Dejan Lovren	(yellow card) 69'
LB	2	Šime Vrsaljko
CM	10	Luka Modrić
CM	7	Ivan Rakitić
RW	4	Ivan Perišić
AM	20	Mateo Kovačić		(substituted off) 61'
LW	18	Ivica Olić
CF	9	Nikica Jelavić		(substituted off) 78'
Substitutions:
MF	14	Marcelo Brozović		(substituted on) 61'
FW	16	Ante Rebić		(substituted on) 78'
Manager:
Niko Kovač

Man of the Match:
Neymar (Brazil)

Assistant referees:
Toru Sagara (Japan)
Toshiyuki Nagi (Japan)
Fourth official:
Alireza Faghani (Iran)
Fifth official:
Hassan Kamranifar (Iran)

=== Brazil vs Mexico ===
The two teams had met in 38 previous matches, including three times in the FIFA World Cup group stage, all won by Brazil (1950: 4–0; 1954: 5–0; 1962: 2–0). Their most recent meeting was in the 2013 FIFA Confederations Cup group stage, won by Brazil 2–0.

Mexican goalkeeper Guillermo Ochoa made four outstanding saves to deny Brazil. In the first half he saved a header from Neymar tight to his right to push around the post and blocked a close-range effort from Paulinho. In the second half he saved a low shot from Neymar and a late point blank header from Thiago Silva.

This was the first time since the 1970 World Cup that the host team drew 0–0 in the group stage. Mexico became the first team from outside UEFA or CONMEBOL to take a point from Brazil in the World Cup.

17 June 2014
16:00 UTC−3

Brazil	0–0	Mexico
	Report

Estádio Castelão, Fortaleza
Attendance: 60,342
Referee: Cüneyt Çakır (Turkey)

Brazil	Mexico

GK	12	Júlio César
RB	2	Dani Alves
CB	3	Thiago Silva (c)	(yellow card) 79'
CB	4	David Luiz
LB	6	Marcelo
DM	8	Paulinho
DM	17	Luiz Gustavo
CM	11	Oscar		(substituted off) 84'
RW	16	Ramires	(yellow card) 45'	(substituted off) 46'
LW	10	Neymar
CF	9	Fred		(substituted off) 68'
Substitutions:
MF	20	Bernard		(substituted on) 46'
FW	21	Jô		(substituted on) 68'
MF	19	Willian		(substituted on) 84'
Manager:
Luiz Felipe Scolari

GK	13	Guillermo Ochoa
CB	2	Francisco Rodríguez
CB	4	Rafael Márquez (c)
CB	15	Héctor Moreno
RWB	22	Paul Aguilar	(yellow card) 59'
LWB	7	Miguel Layún
DM	23	José Juan Vázquez	(yellow card) 62'
CM	6	Héctor Herrera		(substituted off) 76'
CM	18	Andrés Guardado
SS	10	Giovani dos Santos		(substituted off) 84'
CF	19	Oribe Peralta		(substituted off) 74'
Substitutes:
FW	14	Javier Hernández		(substituted on) 74'
MF	8	Marco Fabián		(substituted on) 76'
FW	9	Raúl Jiménez		(substituted on) 84'
Manager:
Miguel Herrera

Man of the Match:
Guillermo Ochoa (Mexico)

Assistant referees:
Bahattin Duran (Turkey)
Tarık Ongun (Turkey)
Fourth official:
Svein Oddvar Moen (Norway)
Fifth official:
Kim Haglund (Norway)

=== Cameroon vs Brazil ===
The two teams had met in four previous matches, including in the 1994 World Cup group stage, won by Brazil 3–0. Their most recent meeting was in the 2003 FIFA Confederations Cup group stage, won by Cameroon 1–0. Cameroon midfielder Alex Song was suspended for the match (first match of a three-match ban), after being sent off in the previous match against Croatia.

Brazil, where a draw would guarantee their qualification to the knockout stage, opened the scoring in the 17th minute when Luiz Gustavo crossed from the left for Neymar to beat the goalkeeper with a first time low side-footed finish to the corner. Already-eliminated Cameroon equalised when Allan Nyom beat Dani Alves on the left before crossing for Joël Matip to finish from close range. Neymar put Brazil back in front when he collected the ball from Marcelo and ran at goal before finishing with a low right foot shot that wrong footed the goalkeeper from just inside the penalty area. In the second half, David Luiz crossed from the left for Fred to extend Brazil's lead with a close range header before half-time substitute Fernandinho completed the scoring when he collected a pass from Oscar before finishing with a low right footed shot. The result assured that Brazil pipped Mexico on goal difference to qualify to the knockout stage as group winners.

The match was Brazil's 100th in the World Cup, and they followed Germany (which played their 100th match in their first game of the 2014 World Cup) to become the second team to reach the milestone.

23 June 2014
17:00 UTC−3

Cameroon	1–4	Brazil
Matip 26'	Report	Neymar 17', 35'; Fred 49'; Fernandinho 84'

Estádio Nacional Mané Garrincha, Brasília
Attendance: 69,112
Referee: Jonas Eriksson (Sweden)

Cameroon	Brazil

GK	16	Charles Itandje
RB	22	Allan Nyom
CB	3	Nicolas N'Koulou (c)
CB	21	Joël Matip
LB	12	Henri Bedimo
DM	7	Landry N'Guémo
CM	17	Stéphane Mbia	(yellow card) 80'
CM	18	Eyong Enoh	(yellow card) 11'
RW	13	Eric Maxim Choupo-Moting		(substituted off) 81'
LW	8	Benjamin Moukandjo		(substituted off) 58'
CF	10	Vincent Aboubakar		(substituted off) 72'
Substitutions:
MF	20	Edgar Salli	(yellow card) 76'	(substituted on) 58'
FW	15	Pierre Webó		(substituted on) 72'
MF	11	Jean Makoun		(substituted on) 81'
Manager:
(Germany) Volker Finke

GK	12	Júlio César
RB	2	Dani Alves
CB	3	Thiago Silva (c)
CB	4	David Luiz
LB	6	Marcelo
DM	17	Luiz Gustavo
RM	8	Paulinho	(substituted off) 46'
LM	11	Oscar
RW	7	Hulk	(substituted off) 63'
LW	10	Neymar	(substituted off) 71'
CF	9	Fred
Substitutions:
MF	5	Fernandinho	(substituted on) 46'
MF	16	Ramires	(substituted on) 63'
MF	19	Willian	(substituted on) 71'
Manager:
Luiz Felipe Scolari

Man of the Match:
Neymar (Brazil)

Assistant referees:
Mathias Klasenius (Sweden)
Daniel Wärnmark (Sweden)
Fourth official:
Svein Oddvar Moen (Norway)
Fifth official:
Kim Haglund (Norway)

== Round of 16 ==
=== Brazil vs Chile ===
The two teams had met in 68 previous matches, including three times in the FIFA World Cup knockout stage, all won by Brazil (1962, semi-finals: 4–2; 1998, round of 16: 4–1; 2010, round of 16: 3–0).

Brazil opened the scoring when from a corner David Luiz turned Thiago Silva's flick-on into the net. While replays suggested that Chilean defender Gonzalo Jara may have had the last touch, FIFA later confirmed that the goal was scored by Luiz, not Jara. Chile equalised when Hulk lost possession after a throw-in in his own half, Eduardo Vargas stole the ball and passed to Alexis Sánchez to score. In the second half, Hulk's goal was disallowed as Howard Webb adjudged that the player used his arm in bringing down the ball and gave him a yellow card instead. Chances were few after that with Brazil dominating possession with Hulk forcing Claudio Bravo into a decent save, and the match went to extra time. The best chance of extra time came in the last seconds as Mauricio Pinilla's shot hit the crossbar. In the resulting penalty shoot-out, the score was tied 2–2 after four rounds, with Brazil goalkeeper Júlio César saving from Pinilla and Sánchez, while Willian missed and Hulk's shot was saved by Bravo. In the fifth round, Neymar scored his penalty, meaning Chile had to score, but Jara's shot hit the inside of the post. Brazil advanced to the quarter-finals to face Colombia.

The result meant that in all four World Cups where Chile qualified for the knockout stage, they were eliminated by Brazil.

28 June 2014
13:00

Brazil	1–1 (a.e.t.)	Chile
David Luiz 18'	Report	Sánchez 32'
Penalties
David Luiz (penalty scored); Willian (penalty missed); Marcelo (penalty scored); Hulk (penalty missed); Neymar (penalty scored)	3–2	(penalty missed) Pinilla; (penalty missed) Sánchez; (penalty scored) Aránguiz; (penalty scored) Díaz; (penalty missed) Jara

Estádio Mineirão, Belo Horizonte
Attendance: 57,714
Referee: Howard Webb (England)

Brazil	Chile

GK	12	Júlio César
RB	2	Dani Alves	(yellow card) 105+1'
CB	3	Thiago Silva (c)
CB	4	David Luiz
LB	6	Marcelo
DM	5	Fernandinho		(substituted off) 72'
DM	17	Luiz Gustavo	(yellow card) 60'
RW	7	Hulk	(yellow card) 55'
AM	11	Oscar		(substituted off) 106'
LW	10	Neymar
CF	9	Fred		(substituted off) 64'
Substitutes:
FW	21	Jô	(yellow card) 93'	(substituted on) 64'
MF	16	Ramires		(substituted on) 72'
MF	19	Willian		(substituted on) 106'
Manager:
Luiz Felipe Scolari

GK	1	Claudio Bravo (c)
CB	5	Francisco Silva	(yellow card) 40'
CB	17	Gary Medel		(substituted off) 108'
CB	18	Gonzalo Jara
RWB	4	Mauricio Isla
LWB	2	Eugenio Mena	(yellow card) 17'
CM	20	Charles Aránguiz
CM	21	Marcelo Díaz
AM	8	Arturo Vidal		(substituted off) 87'
CF	7	Alexis Sánchez
CF	11	Eduardo Vargas		(substituted off) 57'
Substitutes:
MF	16	Felipe Gutiérrez		(substituted on) 57'
FW	9	Mauricio Pinilla	(yellow card) 102'	(substituted on) 87'
DF	13	José Rojas		(substituted on) 108'
Manager:
(Argentina) Jorge Sampaoli

Man of the Match:
Júlio César (Brazil)

Assistant referees:
Michael Mullarkey (England)
Darren Cann (England)
Fourth official:
Felix Brych (Germany)
Fifth official:
Mark Borsch (Germany)

== Quarter-finals ==
=== Brazil vs Colombia ===
The two teams had met in 25 previous matches, but never in the FIFA World Cup. This was the first time Colombia had reached the quarter-finals of the World Cup. Brazil midfielder Luiz Gustavo was suspended for the match due to accumulation of yellow cards.

Brazil took the lead in the 7th minute, when Neymar's corner was turned in from close range by Thiago Silva. They doubled the lead in the 69th minute when David Luiz scored directly from a long range free kick. Colombia reduced the deficit with 10 minutes to go, when James Rodríguez converted a penalty kick, awarded after substitute Carlos Bacca was fouled by Brazil goalkeeper Júlio César. Neymar was kneed in the back by Colombia defender Juan Camilo Zúñiga in the 88th minute, which resulted in the striker's withdrawal from the match. Subsequent medical evaluation discovered a fractured vertebra, forcing the Brazilian to miss the remainder of the tournament. Brazil advanced to the semi-final, where they would face Germany.

Rodríguez's goal was his sixth of the tournament, enough to win him the Golden Boot award. He also became the first player to score in his first five career World Cup matches since Peru's Teófilo Cubillas (across the 1970 and 1978 tournaments).

4 July 2014
17:00

Brazil	2–1	Colombia
Silva 7'; David Luiz 69'	Report	Rodríguez 80' (pen.)

Estádio Castelão, Fortaleza
Attendance: 60,342
Referee: Carlos Velasco Carballo (Spain)

Brazil	Colombia

GK	12	Júlio César	(yellow card) 78'
RB	23	Maicon
CB	3	Thiago Silva (c)	(yellow card) 64'
CB	4	David Luiz
LB	6	Marcelo
CM	5	Fernandinho
CM	8	Paulinho		(substituted off) 86'
RW	7	Hulk		(substituted off) 82'
AM	11	Oscar
LW	10	Neymar		(substituted off) 88'
CF	9	Fred
Substitutes:
MF	16	Ramires		(substituted on) 82'
MF	18	Hernanes		(substituted on) 86'
DF	15	Henrique		(substituted on) 88'
Manager:
Luiz Felipe Scolari

GK	1	David Ospina
RB	18	Juan Camilo Zúñiga
CB	2	Cristián Zapata
CB	3	Mario Yepes (c)	(yellow card) 71'
LB	7	Pablo Armero
RM	11	Juan Cuadrado		(substituted off) 80'
CM	13	Fredy Guarín
CM	6	Carlos Sánchez
LM	14	Víctor Ibarbo		(substituted off) 46'
CF	9	Teófilo Gutiérrez		(substituted off) 70'
CF	10	James Rodríguez	(yellow card) 67'
Substitutes:
FW	19	Adrián Ramos		(substituted on) 46'
FW	17	Carlos Bacca		(substituted on) 70'
MF	20	Juan Quintero		(substituted on) 80'
Manager:
(Argentina) José Pekerman

Man of the Match:
David Luiz (Brazil)

Assistant referees:
Roberto Alonso (Spain)
Juan Carlos Yuste (Spain)
Fourth official:
Svein Oddvar Moen (Norway)
Fifth official:
Kim Haglund (Norway)

== Semi-final ==
=== Brazil vs Germany ===
The two teams had met in 21 previous matches, including in the final of the 2002 World Cup (their only previous encounter in the tournament's history), won by Brazil 2–0.

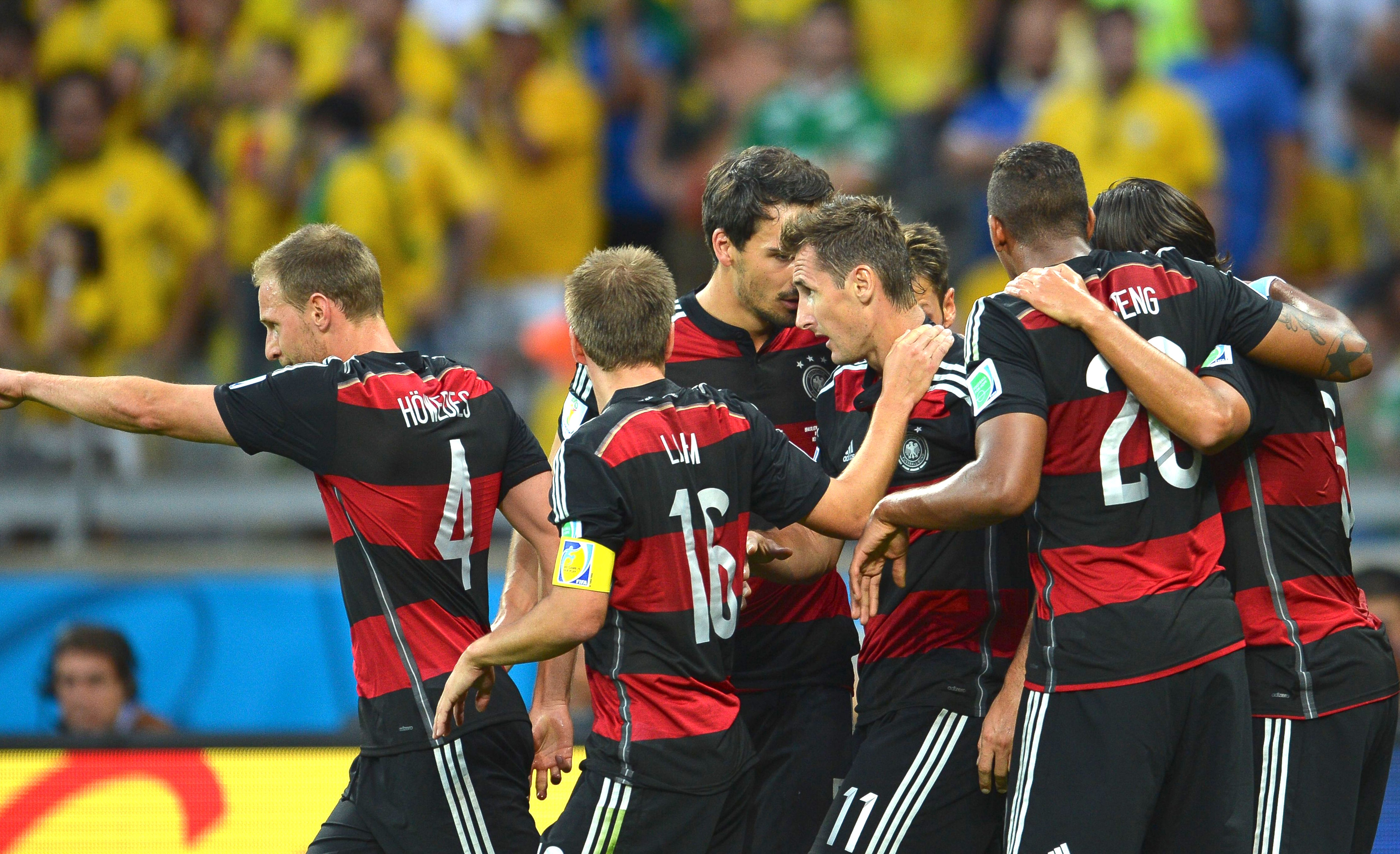
Miroslav Klose (center) celebrating with teammates after scoring the second goal for Germany.

While Germany kept the same starting lineup as their quarter-final against France, Brazil made two changes: defender and captain Thiago Silva was suspended for the match due to accumulation of yellow cards, and was replaced by Dante, while forward Neymar was sidelined after suffering a fractured vertebra in the quarter-final against Colombia, and was replaced by Bernard. Germany took the lead in the 11th minute, Thomas Müller volleying in Toni Kroos' corner. Miroslav Klose scored Germany's second goal, after a passing move saw him set up by Müller, his first shot was saved by Brazil goalkeeper Júlio César, but he slotted in the rebound. Kroos then scored two quick goals, the first one after Philipp Lahm's cross was missed by Müller, the second one after stealing the ball from Fernandinho and playing a quick one-two with Sami Khedira. Khedira then scored Germany's fourth goal in six minutes, after exchanging passes with Mesut Özil, to give Germany a 5–0 halftime lead. Substitute André Schürrle added two more goals in the second half, first slotting in from Lahm's cross, then scoring via the crossbar after a cut-back from Müller. Brazil scored a consolation goal in the 90th minute, as Oscar received a pass from Marcelo, dribbled inside and scored. Germany reached their eighth World Cup final, a record by any nation, where they would face Argentina, while Brazil had to settle for the match for third place against the Netherlands.

The game equalled Brazil's biggest margin of defeat, a 6–0 loss to Uruguay in 1920, and it broke a 62-match home unbeaten streak in competitive matches going back to 1975. The match also broke many World Cup records: It was Brazil's biggest World Cup defeat (eclipsing their 1998 final loss to France), the biggest defeat by a World Cup host nation (previous record was by three goals), and the biggest margin of victory in a World Cup semi-final (three previous semi-finals ended in 6–1 scorelines).

Klose's goal was his 16th overall throughout his World Cup appearances, allowing him to beat Ronaldo for the record of all-time top scorer in World Cup tournaments. Germany's seven goals took their total tally in World Cup history to 223, surpassing Brazil's 221 goals to first place overall.

8 July 2014
17:00

Brazil	1–7	Germany
Oscar 90'	Report	Müller 11'; Klose 23'; Kroos 24', 26'; Khedira 29'; Schürrle 69', 79'

Estádio Mineirão, Belo Horizonte
Attendance: 58,141
Referee: Marco Rodríguez (Mexico)

Brazil	Germany

GK	12	Júlio César
RB	23	Maicon
CB	4	David Luiz (c)
CB	13	Dante	(yellow card) 68'
LB	6	Marcelo
CM	17	Luiz Gustavo
CM	5	Fernandinho		(substituted off) 46'
RW	7	Hulk		(substituted off) 46'
AM	11	Oscar
LW	20	Bernard
CF	9	Fred		(substituted off) 70'
Substitutes:
MF	16	Ramires		(substituted on) 46'
MF	8	Paulinho		(substituted on) 46'
MF	19	Willian		(substituted on) 70'
Manager:
Luiz Felipe Scolari

GK	1	Manuel Neuer
RB	16	Philipp Lahm (c)
CB	20	Jérôme Boateng
CB	5	Mats Hummels	(substituted off) 46'
LB	4	Benedikt Höwedes
CM	6	Sami Khedira	(substituted off) 76'
CM	7	Bastian Schweinsteiger
RW	13	Thomas Müller
AM	18	Toni Kroos
LW	8	Mesut Özil
CF	11	Miroslav Klose	(substituted off) 58'
Substitutes:
DF	17	Per Mertesacker	(substituted on) 46'
MF	9	André Schürrle	(substituted on) 58'
MF	14	Julian Draxler	(substituted on) 76'
Manager:
Joachim Löw

Man of the Match:
Toni Kroos (Germany)

Assistant referees:
Marvin Torrentera (Mexico)
Marcos Quintero (Mexico)
Fourth official:
Mark Geiger (United States)
Fifth official:
Mark Hurd (United States)

== Match for third place ==
=== Brazil vs Netherlands ===
The two teams had met in 11 previous meetings, including four times in the FIFA World Cup: Netherlands won 2–0 in the second group stage of the 1974 World Cup and 2–1 in the quarter-finals of the 2010 World Cup, and Brazil won 3–2 in the quarter-finals of the 1994 World Cup and 4–2 on penalties after a 1–1 draw (after extra time) in the semi-finals of the 1998 FIFA World Cup.

Brazil made six changes in their starting line-up from their semi-final, while the Netherlands made only two, with Wesley Sneijder, who was originally part of the Dutch starting line-up, replaced by Jonathan de Guzmán after an injury during the pre-match warm-up prevented him from playing. The Netherlands opened the scoring within three minutes, after Robin van Persie converted a penalty kick awarded for a foul on Arjen Robben by Thiago Silva. Daley Blind extended the lead in the 17th minute, scoring after a David Luiz headed clearance fell to him inside the penalty area. Georginio Wijnaldum completed the scoring in second half injury time as he shot home from substitute Daryl Janmaat's cross from the right.

The Netherlands finished third for the first time in their World Cup history. With Michel Vorm's participation (who was substituted into the match in second half injury time), the Netherlands became the first team to use all of their 23 players in a World Cup since the finals squads were expanded from 22 to 23 players in 2002. Brazil, who finished fourth for the second time in World Cup history, conceded a total of 14 goals in the tournament, the most they had ever allowed in a World Cup and also the most conceded by any World Cup hosts. Brazil also became the second team to concede 100 World Cup goals, after Germany.

12 July 2014
17:00

Brazil	0–3	Netherlands
	Report	Van Persie 3' (pen.); Blind 17'; Wijnaldum 90+1'

Estádio Nacional Mané Garrincha, Brasília
Attendance: 68,034
Referee: Djamel Haimoudi (Algeria)

Brazil	Netherlands

GK	12	Júlio César
RB	23	Maicon
CB	3	Thiago Silva (c)	(yellow card) 2'
CB	4	David Luiz
LB	14	Maxwell
CM	8	Paulinho		(substituted off) 57'
CM	17	Luiz Gustavo		(substituted off) 46'
RW	16	Ramires		(substituted off) 73'
AM	11	Oscar	(yellow card) 68'
LW	19	Willian
CF	21	Jô
Substitutes:
MF	5	Fernandinho	(yellow card) 54'	(substituted on) 46'
MF	18	Hernanes		(substituted on) 57'
FW	7	Hulk		(substituted on) 73'
Manager:
Luiz Felipe Scolari

GK	1	Jasper Cillessen		(substituted off) 90+3'
CB	3	Stefan de Vrij
CB	2	Ron Vlaar
CB	4	Bruno Martins Indi
RWB	15	Dirk Kuyt
LWB	5	Daley Blind		(substituted off) 70'
CM	20	Georginio Wijnaldum
CM	16	Jordy Clasie		(substituted off) 90'
CM	8	Jonathan de Guzmán	(yellow card) 36'
CF	9	Robin van Persie (c)
CF	11	Arjen Robben	(yellow card) 9'
Substitutes:
DF	7	Daryl Janmaat		(substituted on) 70'
DF	13	Joël Veltman		(substituted on) 90'
GK	22	Michel Vorm		(substituted on) 90+3'
Manager:
Louis van Gaal

Man of the Match:
Arjen Robben (Netherlands)

Assistant referees:
Rédouane Achik (Morocco)
Abdelhalk Etchiali (Algeria)
Fourth official:
Yuichi Nishimura (Japan)
Fifth official:
Toru Sagara (Japan)
