= Jefferson (footballer, born 1983) =

Brazilian footballer

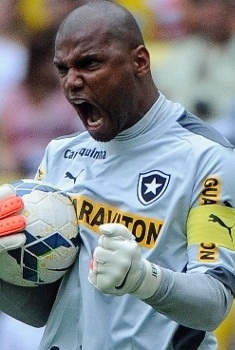
- Jefferson playing for Botafogo in 2014.

Personal information
- Full name: Jefferson de Oliveira Galvão
- Date of birth: 2 January 1983 (age 43)
- Place of birth: São Vicente, Brazil
- Height: 1.89 m (6 ft 2 in)
- Position: Goalkeeper

Youth career
- 1986–1989: Ferroviária
- 1989–1991: Cruzeiro

Senior career*
Years	Team	Apps	(Gls)
2001–2005	Cruzeiro	27	(0)
2003–2005	→ Botafogo (loan)	52	(0)
2005–2008	Trabzonspor	42	(0)
2008–2009	Konyaspor	18	(0)
2009–2018	Botafogo	209	(0)
Total		330	(0)

International career
2003	Brazil-U20	4	(0)
2011–2015	Brazil	22	(0)
- * Club domestic league appearances and goals

Jefferson de Oliveira Galvão, simply known as Jefferson (born 2 January 1983), is a Brazilian former professional footballer who played as a goalkeeper.

Having begun his career at Cruzeiro and spent time on loan at Botafogo, Jefferson then spent four seasons in the Turkish Süper Lig in service of Trabzonspor and Konyaspor before returning to Botafogo. He is one of the eight footballers with the most appearances Botafogo club history, with 459 between the years of 2003 to 2005 and 2009 to 2018.

A former world champion at under-20 level, Jefferson made his senior debut for Brazil in 2011 and was named in their squads for two Copa América tournaments, the 2014 FIFA World Cup and their victory at the 2013 FIFA Confederations Cup.

== Club career ==
=== Early career and Brazil ===
Born in São Vicente, São Paulo, Jefferson was an amateur sprinter before joining Ferroviária's youth setup in 1995, aged 12. He was a forward during his starts at the club, but was reconverted to goalkeeper in the process.

In 1997, Jefferson joined Cruzeiro after a successful trial period. He was called up to the first-team three years later by Luiz Felipe Scolari.

In 2003, after committing a number of high-profile mistakes at Cruzeiro, he was loaned to Botafogo in the same division.

=== Turkey ===
In the summer of 2005, Jefferson joined Turkish Süper Lig team Trabzonspor in a four-year deal as a replacement for Australian goalkeeper Michael Petkovic. He made his debut abroad on 8 June, starting in a 2–1 home success against Kayserispor.

After three full seasons with Trabzonspor, he moved to Konyaspor, in the same division, but could not prevent their relegation in his only season.

=== Botafogo ===
On 25 August 2009, Jefferson returned to Botafogo on a free transfer. He made his second debut for the club on 13 September, keeping a clean sheet in a home draw against city rivals Fluminense.

Jefferson appeared in further 14 matches in the season as Botafogo narrowly avoided relegation. On 18 April 2010, he saved a penalty from Adriano, which granted his side's title of Campeonato Carioca.

On 28 June 2011, Jefferson signed a contract extension through to the end of 2014. He was also elected the best goalkeeper of that year.

== International career ==
Jefferson was a starter for the Brazil under-20 team which became world champions in 2003, in the United Arab Emirates. In July 2011, he was called up to the main squad ahead of 2011 Copa América, acting as a backup to Júlio César, who started in all matches.

On 14 September 2011, he made his first international appearance with the main squad, starting in a 0–0 draw at Argentina, for that year's Superclásico de las Américas. Jefferson also started in the second leg, a 2–0 home success.

Jefferson was named to the 23-man squad ahead of the 2013 FIFA Confederations Cup and the 2014 FIFA World Cup, both on home soil, with Brazil winning the Confederations Cup and reaching the semi-finals in World Cup. Jefferson played in Brazil's 2–0 win over Argentina in the 2014 Superclásico de las Américas in Beijing, saving a penalty from Lionel Messi. He was Brazil's starting goalkeeper at the 2015 Copa América, playing every minute as they reached the quarter-finals, losing in a penalty shoot-out against Paraguay.

== Personal life ==
Jefferson is known for being a devout Christian. On 22 October 2017, he was the victim of a carjacking when he was forced from his vehicle at gun point on his way to training in Rio de Janeiro. He was unharmed during the incident and his vehicle, a black Range Rover, was recovered by police later that day.

== Career statistics ==
=== Club ===
Appearances and goals by club, season and competition
Club	Season	League		National cup		Continental (Note: Includes Copa Libertadores, Copa Sudamericana, UEFA Cup and UEFA Champions League.)		Other (Note: Includes Campeonato Carioca.)		Total	
Club	Season	Apps	Goals	Apps	Goals	Apps	Goals	Apps	Goals	Apps	Goals
Cruzeiro	2000	17	0	0	0	0	0	0	0	17	0
Cruzeiro	2001	1	0	0	0	0	0	8	0	9	0
Cruzeiro	2002	9	0	12	0	0	0	23	0	44	0
Cruzeiro	Total	27	0	12	0	0	0	31	0	70	0
Botafogo (loan)	2003	2	0	0	0	0	0	0	0	2	0
Botafogo (loan)	2004	42	0	3	0	0	0	10	0	55	0
Botafogo (loan)	2005	8	0	3	0	0	0	12	0	23	0
Botafogo (loan)	Total	52	0	6	0	0	0	22	0	80	0
Trabzonspor	2005–06	26	0	1	0	2	0	—		29	0
Trabzonspor	2006–07	15	0	2	0	0	0	—		17	0
Trabzonspor	2007–08	3	0	1	0	0	0	—		4	0
Trabzonspor	Total	42	0	4	0	2	0	—		50	0
Konyaspor	2008–09	18	0	0	0	—		—		18	0
Botafogo	2009	15	0	—		4	0	—		19	0
Botafogo	2010	36	0	4	0	—		15	0	55	0
Botafogo	2011	30	0	6	0	3	0	15	0	54	0
Botafogo	2012	30	0	5	0	2	0	20	0	57	0
Botafogo	2013	26	0	9	0	0	0	17	0	52	0
Botafogo	2014	27	0	2	0	8	0	3	0	40	0
Botafogo	2015	26	0	4	0	0	0	10	0	40	0
Botafogo	2016	0	0	1	0	0	0	18	0	19	0
Botafogo	2017	6	0	1	0	0	0	0	0	7	0
Botafogo	2018	13	0	1	0	1	0	8	0	23	0
Botafogo	Total	209	0	33	0	18	0	106	0	366	0
Career total		330	0	55	0	20	0	159	0	566	0

=== International ===
Appearances and goals by national team and year
National team	Year	Apps	Goals
Brazil	2011	4	0
Brazil	2012	2	0
Brazil	2013	3	0
Brazil	2014	4	0
Brazil	2015	9	0
Total		22	0

== Honours ==
Cruzeiro

- Copa Sul-Minas: 2001, 2002
- Supercampeonato Mineiro: 2002

Botafogo

- Rio de Janeiro State League: 2010, 2013, 2018
- Taça Guanabara: 2010, 2013, 2015
- Taça Rio: 2010, 2012, 2013
- Campeonato Brasileiro Série B: 2015

Brazil

- FIFA Confederations Cup: 2013
- Superclásico de las Américas: 2011, 2012, 2014

Brazil U20

- FIFA World Youth Championship: 2003

Individual

- Campeonato Brasileiro Série A Team of the Year: 2011, 2014
