= Estádio Acrísio Cruz =

Association football stadium in Botucatu

- Interactive map of Estádio Acrísio Cruz
- Full name: Estádio Dr. Acrísio Paes Cruz
- Location: Botucatu, São Paulo state, Brazil
- Coordinates: 22.876438639721083°S 48.44808608629765°W
- Owner: AA Ferroviária
- Capacity: 5,000
- Surface: Natural grass
- Field size: 105 by 68 metres (114.8 yd × 74.4 yd)

Construction
- Opened: 1945

Estádio Acrísio Cruz is an association football stadium in Botucatu, on the countryside of São Paulo, Brazil. The stadium holds 5.000 people. It was inaugurated in 1945.
