= Marcos Sugiyama =

Japanese volleyball player (born 1973)

Marcos Sugiyama (born Marcos Almeida Esteves, 16 November 1973) is a Brazilian and former Japanese volleyball player. He played for the Japanese volleyball team, Sakai Blazers, Suntory Sunbirds and Toyoda Gosei Trefuerza. He obtained his Japanese citizenship in 2003. He started practicing volleyball at just 8 years old at Dom Lucio State School and became a professional athlete at 17 years old and ended his professional volleyball career at 42 years old. Sugiyama became a volleyball coach in 2014. He graduated as a Physical Education Teacher and is also graduated as a volleyball coach by the Brazilian Volleyball Confederation Level (I, II, III). His mother is Japanese and practiced athletics in the long jump and high jump events as well as fast runs. His father was Brazilian footballer Kalé who played for Yanmar Diesel as the first black player to play in the Japan Soccer League. Sugiyama lives in Indonesia. Marcos have 1 son, who lives in Brazil.
