= Hideya Okamoto =

Japanese footballer

Hideya Okamoto 岡本 英也
Personal information
- Full name: Hideya Okamoto
- Date of birth: 18 May 1987 (age 39)
- Place of birth: Sakai, Osaka, Japan
- Height: 1.83 m (6 ft 0 in)
- Position: Striker

Team information
- Current team: Tiamo Hirakata
- Number: 9

Youth career
- 2000–2005: Gamba Osaka

Senior career*
Years	Team	Apps	(Gls)
2006–2008	Gamba Osaka	3	(0)
2009–2011	Avispa Fukuoka	100	(16)
2012	Kashima Antlers	5	(0)
2013–2014	Albirex Niigata	59	(7)
2015	Oita Trinita	9	(0)
2015	→ Fagiano Okayama (loan)	9	(1)
2016	Fagiano Okayama	4	(0)
2016	→ Renofa Yamaguchi (loan)	10	(0)
2017	Renofa Yamaguchi	8	(0)
2017–	Nagano Parceiro	7	(0)

International career
2006	Japan U-19		
Medal record
Gamba Osaka
Winner	AFC Champions League	2008
Winner	J.League Cup	2007
Winner	Emperor's Cup	2008
Runner-up	Emperor's Cup	2006
Kashima Antlers
Winner	J.League Cup	2012
- * Club domestic league appearances and goals as of 23 February 2018

Hideya Okamoto (岡本 英也, Okamoto Hideya; born 18 May 1987 in Sakai, Osaka) is a Japanese footballer currently playing for Tiamo Hirakata.

== Club career statistics ==
Updated to 23 February 2018.

Club	season	League		Cup		League Cup		AFC		Total	
Club	season	Apps	Goals	Apps	Goals	Apps	Goals	Apps	Goals	Apps	Goals
Gamba Osaka	2006	0	0	0	0	0	0	0	0	0	0
Gamba Osaka	2007	0	0	0	0	0	0	–		0	0
Gamba Osaka	2008	3	0	0	0	0	0	1	0	4	0
Avispa Fukuoka	2009	35	5	1	0	–		–		36	5
Avispa Fukuoka	2010	35	3	4	1	–		–		39	4
Avispa Fukuoka	2011	30	8	2	1	2	0	–		34	9
Kashima Antlers	2012	5	0	1	1	3	1	–		9	2
Albirex Niigata	2013	27	6	2	0	5	3	–		34	9
Albirex Niigata	2014	32	1	2	2	5	0	–		39	3
Oita Trinita	2015	9	0	–		–		–		9	0
Fagiano Okayama	2015	9	1	1	0	–		–		10	1
Fagiano Okayama	2016	4	0	–		–		–		4	0
Renofa Yamaguchi	2016	10	0	0	0	–		–		10	0
Renofa Yamaguchi	2017	8	0	0	0	–		–		8	0
Nagano Parceiro	2017	7	0	0	0	–		–		7	0
Career total		214	24	13	5	15	4	1	0	243	33

== Honours ==
Gamba Osaka

- AFC Champions League (1) : 2008

Kashima Antlers

- J. League Cup (1) : 2012
- Suruga Bank Championship (1) : 2012
