= Mão de Onça =

Brazilian footballer

Personal information
- Full name: Durval de Moraes
- Date of birth: 2 June 1931
- Place of birth: Itu, Brazil
- Date of death: 21 December 2023 (aged 92)
- Place of death: São Paulo, Brazil
- Height: 1.88 m (6 ft 2 in)
- Position: Goalkeeper

Senior career*
Years	Team	Apps	(Gls)
1958	CA Ituano		
1959–1967	Juventus-SP	179	(0)
- * Club domestic league appearances and goals as of 16 January 2024

Durval de Moraes (2 June 1931 – 21 December 2023), better known by the nickname Mão de Onça, was a Brazilian professional footballer who played as a goalkeeper.

== Career ==
A goalkeeper with a privileged physical size, Mão de Onça had a career at CA Juventus, where he played from 1959 to 1967 and made 179 appearances. He entered to Brazilian football history on 2 August 1959 when he conceded what is considered the most beautiful goal scored by Pelé.

== Death ==
Durval Mão de Onça died 21 December 2023, in a hospital in the district of Parelheiros, São Paulo, aged 92.
