= Renato Cajá =

Brazilian footballer

Personal information
- Full name: Renato Adriano Jacó Morais
- Date of birth: 15 September 1984 (age 42)
- Place of birth: Paraíba, Brazil
- Height: 1.73 m (5 ft 8 in)
- Position: Attacking midfielder

Team information
- Current team: Inter de Limeira

Youth career
- 2000–2004: Mogi Mirim

Senior career*
Years	Team	Apps	(Gls)
2003–2005	Mogi Mirim	0	(0)
2006	Ferroviária-SP	28	(4)
2007	Juventude	35	(5)
2008	Ponte Preta	39	(15)
2009	Al-Ittihad	25	(3)
2009	Grêmio	4	(0)
2010–2011	Botafogo	47	(8)
2011–2014	Guangzhou Evergrande	10	(0)
2011–2012	→ Ponte Preta (loan)	16	(5)
2012	→ Kashima Antlers (loan)	14	(2)
2013	→ Vitória (loan)	32	(2)
2014	→ Bursaspor (loan)	8	(0)
2014–2015	Ponte Preta	35	(11)
2015–2016	Sharjah FC	13	(1)
2016–2017	Bahia	32	(4)
2017	Ponte Preta	18	(1)
2018	Goiás	27	(2)
2019–2021	Juventude	44	(7)
2019	→ Ponte Preta (loan)	13	(2)
2021	Ferroviária	12	(2)
2021	CSA	1	(0)
2022–	Inter de Limeira	0	(0)
- * Club domestic league appearances and goals as of 18:52, 28 February 2020 (UTC)

Renato Adriano Jacó Moreira (born 15 September 1984), known as Renato Cajá, is a Brazilian professional footballer who plays for Inter de Limeira as an attacking midfielder.

== Club career ==
Renato Cajá previously played for Juventude, Ponte Preta, Grêmio and Botafogo in the Campeonato Brasileiro.

On 8 March 2011, Chinese Super League club Guangzhou Evergrande announced that they had signed Renato Cajá on a four-year deal with a fee of US$2.25 million. On 9 April, he made his CSL debut in a 1–1 away draw against Nanchang Hengyuan in the second round of the season. On 17 April, in a league match which Guangzhou Evergrande played against Beijing Guoan at home, he was unhappy for being substituted out by team manager Lee Jang-Soo and returned to dressing room directly. He received a ban of 3 matches and was sent to reserve team by the club. After Cléo suffered a muscular strain in early May, he had a further chance to play for the club. However, Renato Cajá eventually could not adapt himself to the team's strategy. On 2 July, Argentine midfielder Darío Conca joined Guangzhou Evergrande with a domestic record fee of $10 million. Renato Cajá was ruled out in the squad due to the foreign players restriction. He was loaned back to Ponte Preta on 15 July for one year with a fee of US$600,000.

In June 2012, Renato Cajá was loaned to J1 League side Kashima Antlers for six months. Kashima Antlers also had an option to make the move permanent in the end of the 2012 league season with a fee of US$2 million. Renato Cajá made his debut in the first leg of 2012 J. League Cup quarter-finals which Kashima Antlers played against Cerezo Osaka on 25 July, coming on as a substitute for Júnior Dutra in the second half. His first J League debut came on three days later, in a 2–2 home draw against Sanfrecce Hiroshima. On 1 August, Renato Cajá scored his first goal for Kashima in the 2012 Suruga Bank Championship. He kept his good performance and scored his first league goal from a direct free kick on 11 August, which ensured Kashima beat Júbilo Iwata 2–1. Renato Cajá scored 3 goals in 20 appearances for Kashima before he was loaned return to Guangzhou Evergrande on 30 December.

Renato Cajá moved to Campeonato Brasileiro Série A side Vitória on loan on 15 January 2013. On 13 January 2014, he was loaned to Süper Lig side Bursaspor until the end of 2013–14 league season. In July 2014, he was transferred to Série B club Ponte Preta.
