= Milton Buzetto =

Brazilian footballer

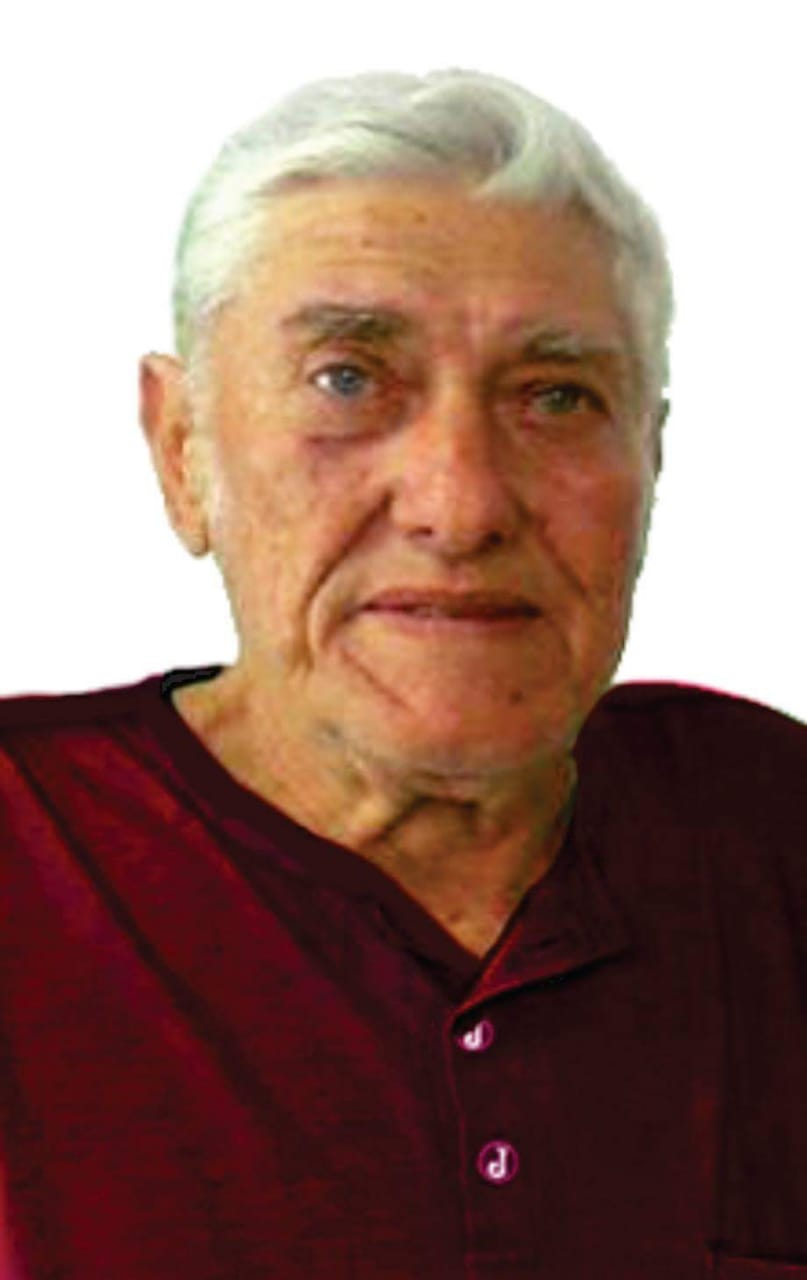

Personal information
- Full name: Milton Buzetto
- Date of birth: 14 November 1937
- Place of birth: Piracicaba, Brazil
- Date of death: 17 September 2018 (aged 80)
- Place of death: Piracicaba, Brazil
- Position: Defender

Youth career
- –1956: Palmeiras

Senior career*
Years	Team	Apps	(Gls)
1956–1958	Palmeiras	46	(0)
1958–1959	→ Noroeste (loan)		
1959–1960	→ Bragantino (loan)		
1960–1969	Juventus-SP	166	(0)

Managerial career
- 1971–1975: Juventus-SP
- 1975–1976: Corinthians
- 1976–1977: Guarani
- 1978–1979: Goiás
- 1979–1980: Mixto
- 1980–1981: Inter de Limeira
- 1981–1982: Atlético Paranaense
- 1982: Capivariano
- 1983: Grêmio Maringá
- 1983–1984: Uberaba
- 1984–1985: Juventus-SP
- 1985–1987: Comercial-MS
- 1987–1988: Francana
- 1993–1994: Paulista
- 2001: Jabaquara
- * Club domestic league appearances and goals

Milton Buzetto (14 November 1937 – 17 September 2018), was a Brazilian professional footballer and manager, who played as a defender.

== Career ==
Defender, Milton Buzetto was revealed at Palmeiras, and played for the club from 1956 to 1958, playing in 46 matches. He had spells in Noroeste and Bragantino, until arriving at Juventus in 1960, a club where he played throughout the 1960s and made 166 appearances.

== Managerial career ==
As a coach, he became known as "Rei da Retranca" due to his ultra-defensive style. He started his career at Juventus and played for several Brazilian football clubs, with spells at Corinthians and Athletico Paranaense, and winning state titles with Mixto and Comercial-MS.

== Honours ==
=== Manager ===
Juventus

- Asahi International Soccer Tournament: 1974

Mixto

- Campeonato Mato-Grossense: 1979

Comercial-MS

- Campeonato Sul-Mato-Grossense: 1985

== Death ==
Buzetto passed away in his hometown Piracicaba, 17 September 2018 at the age of 80, due to aortic artery dissection.
