= Associação Atlética Ferroviária =

Brazilian sports club

Ferroviária
- Full name: Associação Atlética Ferroviária
- Founded: 3 May 1939; 86 years ago
- Ground: Estádio Acrísio Cruz; Botucatu, São Paulo State, Brazil
- Capacity: 3,000
Home colors	Away colors	Third colors

Associação Atlética Ferroviária, usually called Ferroviária, is a multi-sports and social club from Botucatu in São Paulo state.

They play in red, black and white shirts, white shorts and red socks.

== History ==
The club was founded on May 3, 1939, by club company.

== Stadium ==
The club play their home games at Estádio Acrísio Cruz. The stadium has a maximum capacity of 5,000 people.

== Mascot ==
The club's mascot is a locomotive.
