= Ezequiel Videla =

Argentine footballer (born 1988)

Personal information
- Full name: Ezequiel Oscar Videla Greppi
- Date of birth: 15 January 1988 (age 38)
- Place of birth: Cosquín, Córdoba, Argentina
- Height: 1.74 m (5 ft 9 in)
- Position: Defensive midfielder

Team information
- Current team: Racing Club (reserves manager)

Youth career
- 2001–2009: Rosario Central

Senior career*
Years	Team	Apps	(Gls)
2009–2010	Montevideo Wanderers	24	(2)
2010–2011	San Martín SJ	34	(0)
2011–2012	Instituto	31	(1)
2012–2014	Universidad de Chile	20	(0)
2014	→ Colón (loan)	19	(0)
2014–2017	Racing Club	46	(1)
2017–2018	Instituto	12	(0)
2018–2019	Guaraní	14	(0)
2019	Aldosivi	5	(0)
2021	Deportivo Maipú	0	(0)
Total		205	(4)

Managerial career
- 2023–: Racing Club (reserves)
- 2023: Racing Club (interim)
- * Club domestic league appearances and goals

Ezequiel Oscar Videla Greppi (born 15 January 1988), known as Ezequiel Videla (Spanish pronunciation: [eseˈkjel βiˈðela]), is an Argentine football manager and former player who played as a defensive midfielder. He is the current manager of Racing Club's reserve team.
