= José Rojas (footballer, born 1983) =

Chilean footballer

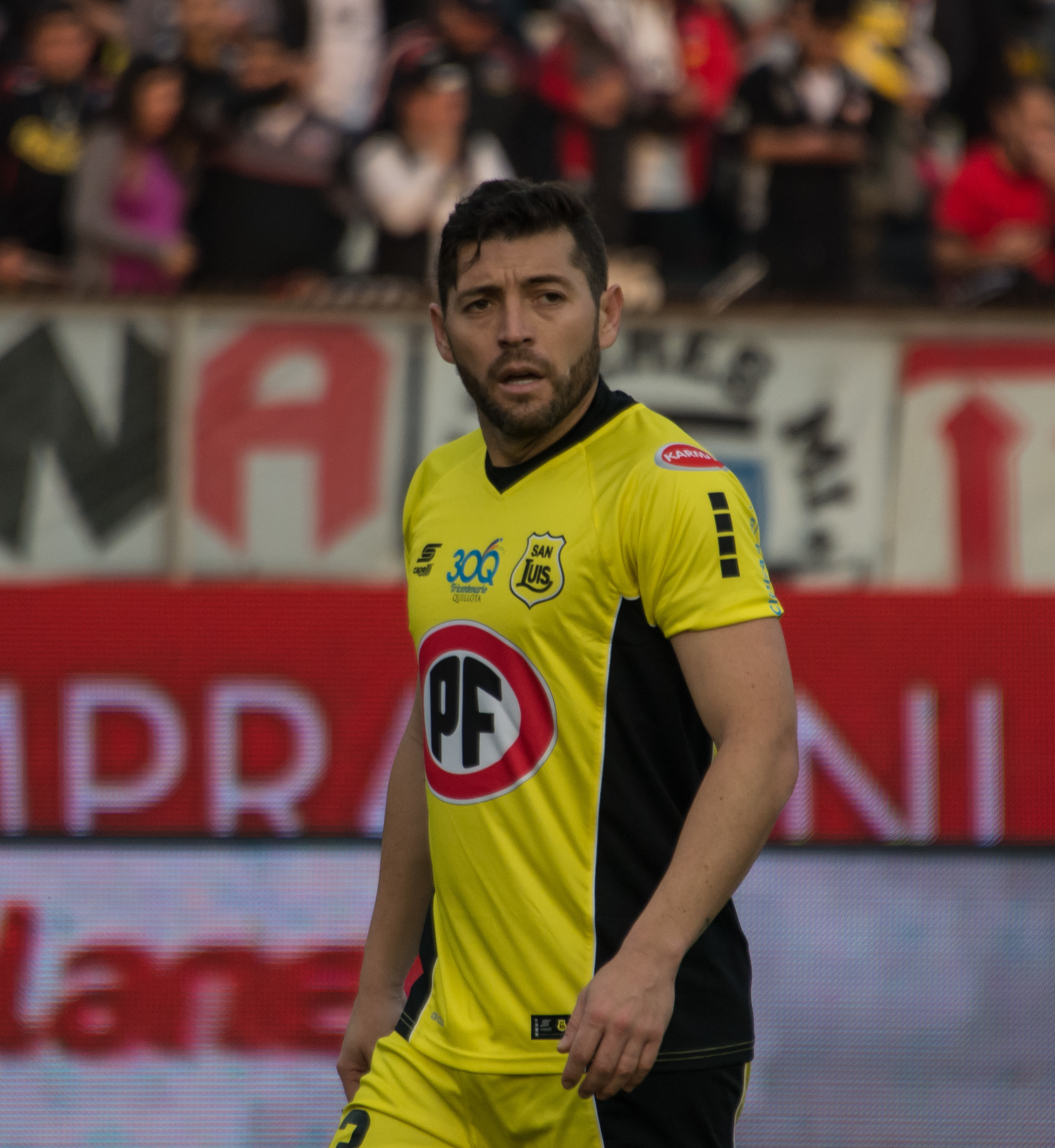
- Rojas in 2018

Personal information
- Full name: José Manuel Rojas Bahamondes
- Date of birth: 23 June 1983 (age 43)
- Place of birth: Talagante, Chile
- Height: 1.76 m (5 ft 9 in)
- Position: Defender

Youth career
- Universidad de Chile

Senior career*
Years	Team	Apps	(Gls)
2003–2015	Universidad de Chile	365	(7)
2006	→ Independiente (loan)	3	(0)
2016	Belgrano	23	(0)
2017	Lorca	17	(1)
2017–2018	San Luis	34	(0)
2019	Huachipato	19	(1)
2020–2022	Curicó Unido	56	(2)
Total		517	(11)

International career
2007–2015	Chile	24	(1)
Medal record
Representing Chile
Winner	Copa América	2015
- * Club domestic league appearances and goals

José Manuel Rojas Bahamondes (born 23 June 1983), known as José Rojas, is a Chilean former professional footballer who played as a defender. Primarily a central defender, he could also be deployed as a left-back.

== Club career ==
Rojas has played the whole of his career for Universidad de Chile except a brief stint with Argentine side Independiente in 2006. He has won four league championships with Universidad de Chile, in Apertura 2004, Apertura 2009 and Apertura and Clausura 2011. For the 2011 season he was selected by his teammates as captain, after Miguel Pinto left the club. In 2011, he captained Universidad de Chile to its first international title as they won the 2011 edition of the Copa Sudamericana in Santiago.

In 13 February 2023, he announced his retirement after twenty years as a professional footballer.

== International career ==
He made his debut with Chile national team on 9 May 2007, in a friendly against Cuba scoring a goal in the game.

== Personal life ==
Rojas is the uncle of Alonso Rodríguez Rojas, a footballer from the Universidad de Chile youth ranks.

== Career statistics ==
Goal	Date	Venue	Opponent	Score	Result	Competition
1	12 August 2009	Estadio Rubén Marcos Peralta, Osorno, Chile	Cuba	2-0	3-0	Friendly

== Honours ==
Universidad de Chile

- Primera División de Chile (6): 2004–A, 2009–A, 2011–A, 2011–C, 2012–A, 2014–A 1
- Copa Sudamericana: 2011
- Copa Chile (2): 2012–13, 2015
- Supercopa de Chile: 2015

(1): “A” and “C” refer the Apertura and Clausura tournaments that divide the Chilean football champions.

Chile

- Copa América: 2015
