= Charles Aránguiz =

Chilean footballer (born 1989)

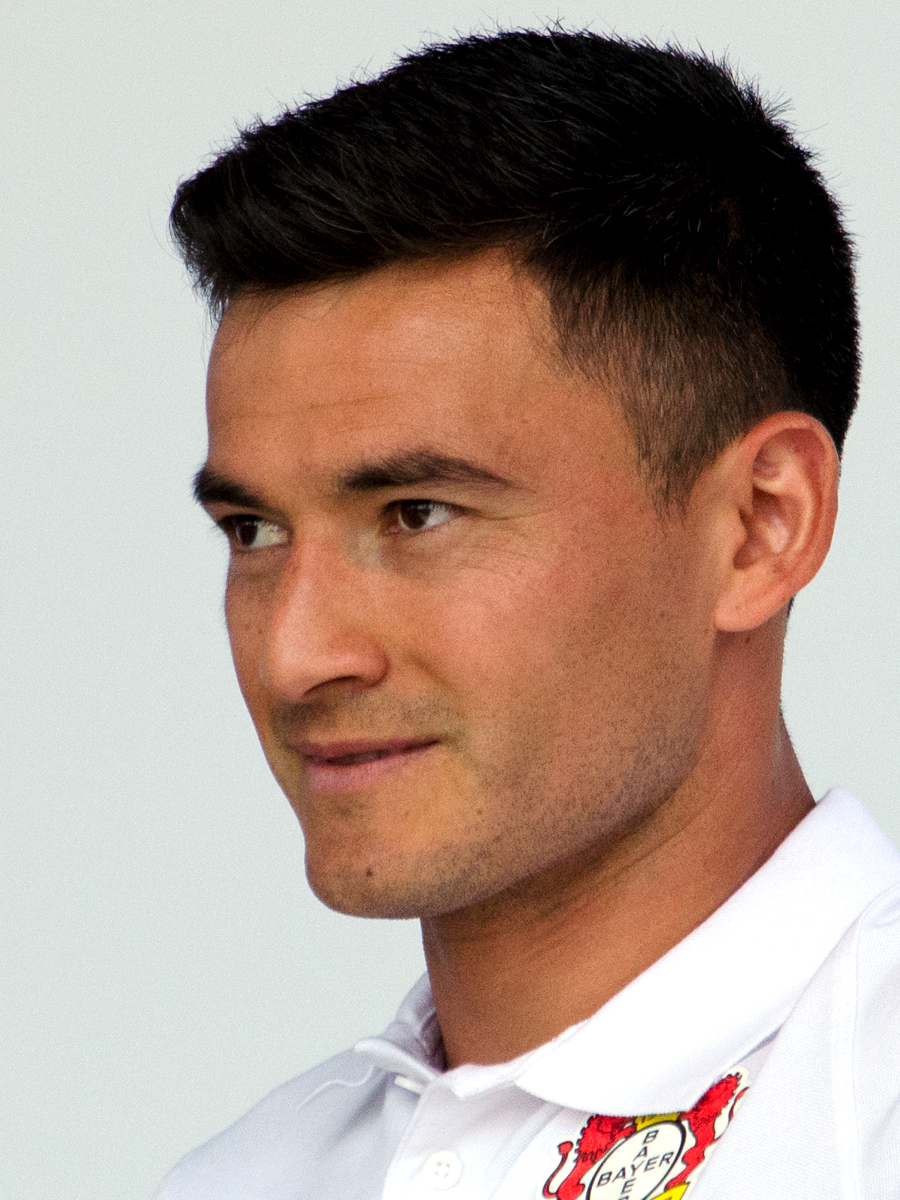
- Aránguiz with Bayer Leverkusen in 2018

Personal information
- Full name: Charles Mariano Aránguiz Sandoval
- Date of birth: 17 April 1989 (age 37)
- Place of birth: Puente Alto, Santiago, Chile
- Height: 1.71 m (5 ft 7 in)
- Position: Midfielder

Team information
- Current team: Universidad de Chile
- Number: 20

Youth career
- 2000–2002: Universidad de Chile
- 2002–2006: Cobreloa

Senior career*
Years	Team	Apps	(Gls)
2006–2009	Cobreloa	97	(11)
2007	→ Cobresal (loan)	14	(1)
2009–2010	Colo-Colo	32	(5)
2010	Quilmes	14	(0)
2011–2013	Universidad de Chile	95	(20)
2014	Udinese	0	(0)
2014–2015	Internacional	38	(9)
2015–2023	Bayer Leverkusen	168	(10)
2023–2024	Internacional	41	(1)
2024–	Universidad de Chile	18	(3)

International career^{‡}
2008	Chile U20	4	(1)
2009–	Chile	103	(7)
Medal record
Representing Chile
Copa América
Winner	2015 Chile
Winner	2016 United States
- * Club domestic league appearances and goals as of 12 July 2025 ‡ National team caps and goals as of 25 March 2025

Charles Mariano Aránguiz Sandoval (Spanish pronunciation: [ˈtʃaɾles aˈɾaŋɡis]; born 17 April 1989) is a Chilean professional footballer who plays as a midfielder for Liga de Primera club Universidad de Chile.

With his former club Universidad de Chile, Aránguiz was considered one of the best midfielders in the Chilean Primera División, with a good sense of tactics, impressive stamina and intelligent playmaking, marking and passing abilities. He can play as a defensive, center or even as a right wing midfielder. He is described by FIFA's official website as "a crafty, tigerish midfielder of the highest order, notable for his ability to win and distribute the ball, pick out passes and hit the back of the net".

== Club career ==
=== Early life ===
Aránguiz was born in Puente Alto in Diego Portales neighborhood. His mother, Mariana Sandoval, is a football coach. He started to play football in Universidad de Chile before leaving the club to join Cobreloa Academy when he was around 13 years old.

=== Early career ===
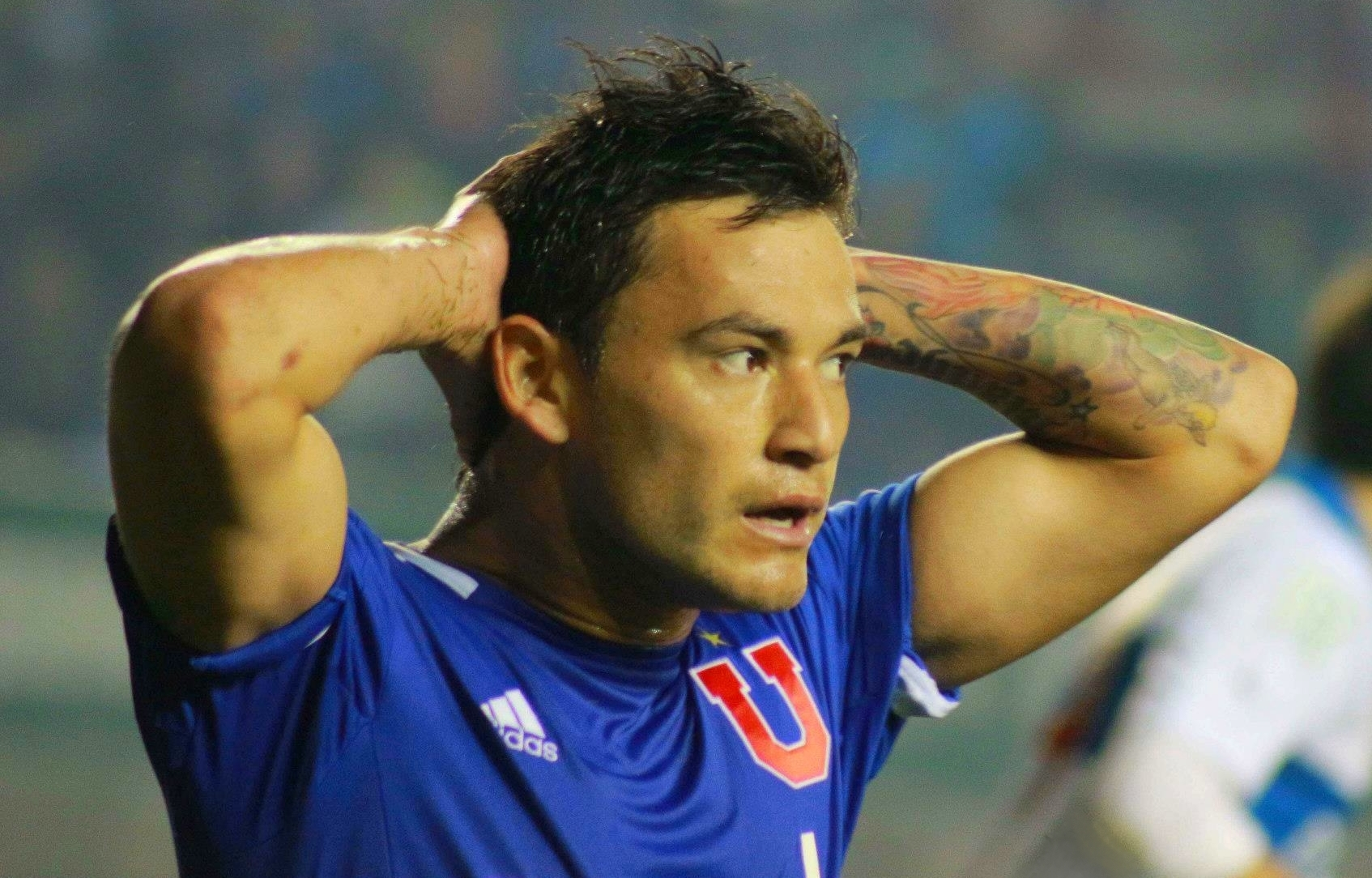
Aránguiz playing for Universidad de Chile in 2013

Aránguiz made his professional debut in 2006, for Cobreloa against Cobresal. His first goal in the Primera División was against O'Higgins in the same year. After a spell on loan at Cobresal, Aránguiz joined Colo-Colo, where he won the Clausura championship in 2009.

In 2010, Aránguiz had a short spell at Argentine club Quilmes, before joining Colo-Colo's historic rivals Universidad de Chile for a fee of £616,000 on 1 January 2011. He immediately became an integral part of the squad, helping "U" to win the 2011 Copa Sudamericana, where the Chilean team remained unbeaten for the entire tournament. By defeating Ecuadorian side Liga de Quito 4–0 on aggregate in the final, Universidad de Chile became the first Chilean side to win a continental competition in twenty years.

Having drawn 3–3 on aggregate with Unión Española in the semi-finals of the Copa Chile, Aránguiz led his team to the final, netting the "U"'s first kick in a 5–4 penalty shoot-out victory on 17 April 2013. In the final, he played the full ninety minutes as Universidad secured a 2–1 win over Universidad Católica thanks to a stoppage-time goal from Juan Ignacio Duma.

=== Internacional ===
On 11 January 2014, it was announced that Aránguiz was signed by Brazilian club Internacional on loan until 15 August 2014 from Granada, after its owner Giampaolo Pozzo, who also owns Udinese and Watford, had bought half of his rights from Universidad de Chile. Although he never played for the Spanish club, as he was quickly loaned to the Brazilian club and later sold.

He was named the MVP of the 2014 Campeonato Gaúcho as Internacional won the tournament for a record 43rd time.

On 11 June 2014, Charles Aránguiz's purchase was announced by Internacional's board in a joint transaction with investor Delcir Sonda for an undisclosed fee. Aránguiz signed a new contract which expires in June 2018.

=== Bayer Leverkusen ===
On 13 August 2015, Bayer Leverkusen announced that they had signed Aránguiz from Internacional for an undisclosed fee thought to be around £8.6m. He was given the number 20 shirt. Aranguiz was the subject of a fierce transfer battle between Bayer and Leicester City and despite the latter offering him a significantly higher salary, Aranguiz opted to move to Bayer Leverkusen. Aranguiz stated that Leicester was a small club and that he wanted to play in the Champions League. Aránguiz was appointed as club captain ahead of the 2020–21 season, after Lars Bender abdicated the role due to ongoing injury issues.

=== Return to Internacional ===
On 19 February 2023, it was announced Aránguiz had signed a pre-contract with returned to Internacional on a two-year deal. On 2 April, Bayer Leverkusen announced that Aránguiz would move to return to Internacional immediately.

=== Return to Universidad de Chile ===
In the second half of 2024, Aránguiz returned to Universidad de Chile on a deal until the end of 2025.

== International career ==
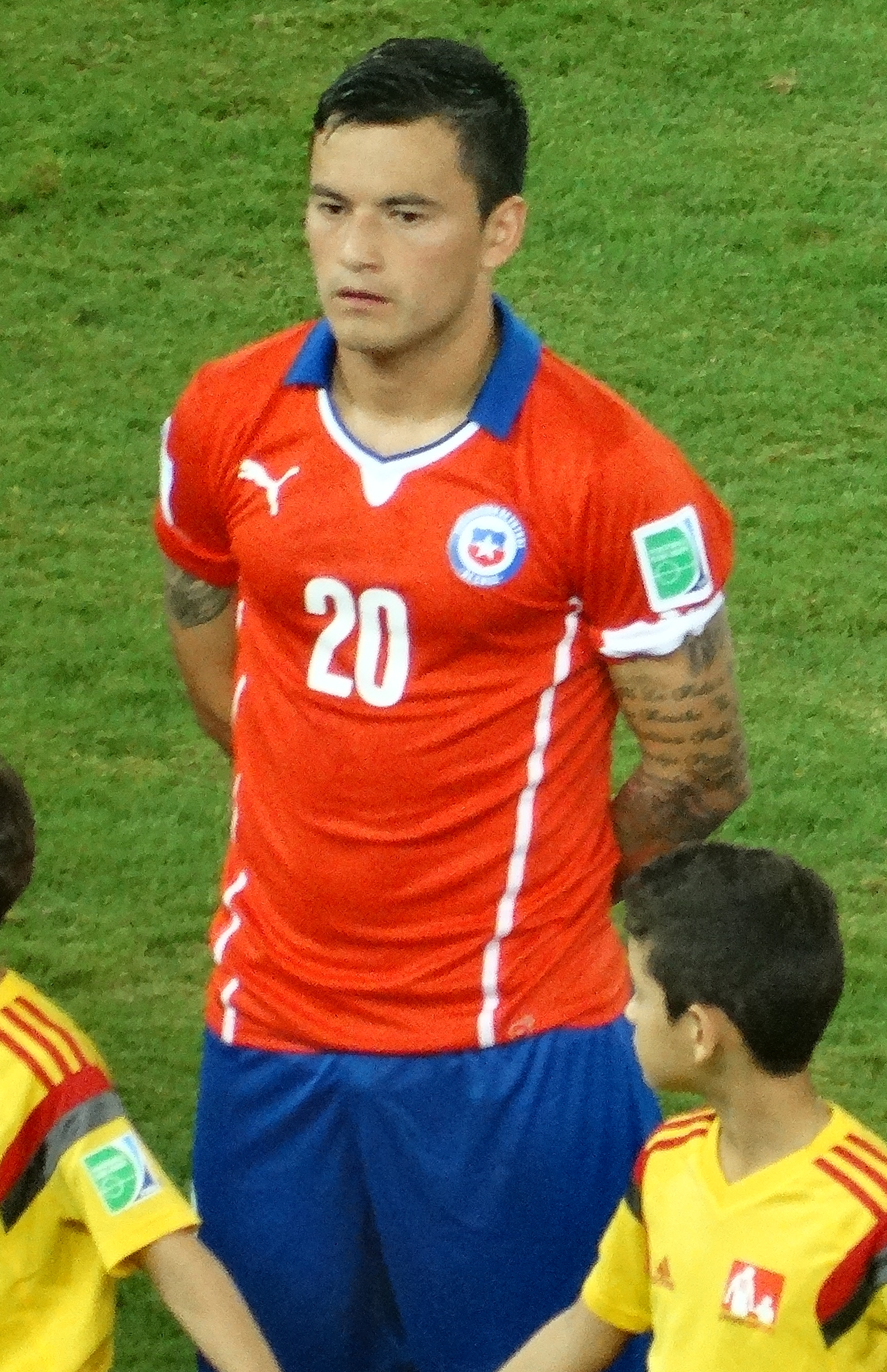
Aránguiz during the hymn ceremony at the Chile vs. Australia match for the 2014 FIFA World Cup

Aránguiz participated in Milk Cup in 2007. In 2008, he participated in Toulon Tournament, Milk Cup, and the Talents Cup. Along with Chile youth team he won the 2008 João Havelange Tournament. He participated for the U-20 Chile team in 2009 South American Youth Championship; there he scored one goal in the championship from a free kick.

Aránguiz made his debut for the Chile national team in 2009, but was not selected for the 2010 FIFA World Cup or the 2011 Copa América. He established himself in the Chile team during its successful 2014 FIFA World Cup qualification campaign, making seven appearances and scoring in wins against Bolivia and Venezuela.

On 1 June 2014, Aránguiz was named to Chile's final 23-man roster for the 2014 FIFA World Cup in Brazil. In Chile's second group match against defending champions Spain at the Estádio do Maracanã, he provided the assist for Eduardo Vargas's goal before scoring himself as Chile eliminated Spain and secured qualification to the round of 16.

At the 2015 Copa América, held in Chile, Aránguiz scored twice during a 5–0 defeat of Bolivia which ensured that La Roja would progress to the knockout stage as Group A winners.

The following year, Aránguiz was once again a key player for Chile in their 2016 Copa América Centenario triumph. Aránguiz scored the crucial opening goal against Colombia in Chile's 2–0 semi-final victory over them. He then also played great in the final against Argentina and he converted a vital penalty in the penalty shoot-out which gave Chile victory once again against Argentina. Chile raised the Copa America trophy with this triumph and Aránguiz was a key player for them throughout the tournament.

On 12 October 2023, Aránguiz played his 100th international match for Chile in a 2–0 win over Peru during the 2026 FIFA World Cup qualification.

== Personal life ==
His mother, Mariana Sandoval, was a football coach and leader at amateur level for over 30 years in Puente Alto and was highlighted by CONMEBOL due to these contributions.

His brother, Gilberto, is a football coach working for club Municipal Puente Alto in the Chilean Tercera B during 2022.

His cousin, Mario Sandoval, is also a professional football player.

== Career statistics ==
=== Club ===
As of match played 16 July 2025

Appearances and goals by club, season and competition
Club	Season	League			State league		National cup		Continental		Other		Total	
Club	Season	Division	Apps	Goals	Apps	Goals	Apps	Goals	Apps	Goals	Apps	Goals	Apps	Goals
Universidad de Chile	2011	Chilean Primera División	39	4	—		5	0	12 (Note: Appearance(s) in Copa Sudamericana)	0	—		56	4
Universidad de Chile	2012	Chilean Primera División	31	4	—		5	0	16 (Note: Twelve appearances in Copa Libertadores, four appearances in Copa Sudamericana)	0	2 (Note: Appearances in Recopa Sudamericana)	0	54	4
Universidad de Chile	2013	Chilean Primera División	12	5	—		4	2	5 (Note: Appearances in Copa Libertadores)	1	1 (Note: Appearance in Supercopa de Chile)	0	22	8
Universidad de Chile	2013–14	Chilean Primera División	13	7	—		0	0	5	4	—		18	11
Universidad de Chile	Total		95	20	—		14	2	38	5	3	0	140	27
Internacional	2014	Série A	24	6	9 (Note: Appearances in Campeonato Gaúcho)	3	4	1	1	0	—		38	10
Internacional	2015	Série A	—		5	0	—		11	0	—		16	0
Internacional	Total		24	6	14	3	4	1	12	0	—		54	10
Bayer Leverkusen	2015–16	Bundesliga	7	2	—		—		0	0	—		7	2
Bayer Leverkusen	2016–17	Bundesliga	26	2	—		2	0	8 (Note: Appearances in UEFA Champions League)	0	—		36	2
Bayer Leverkusen	2017–18	Bundesliga	27	1	—		4	1	—		—		31	2
Bayer Leverkusen	2018–19	Bundesliga	24	2	—		1	0	4 (Note: Appearance(s) in UEFA Europa League)	1	—		29	3
Bayer Leverkusen	2019–20	Bundesliga	27	1	—		4	1	8 (Note: Five appearances and one goal in UEFA Champions League, three appearances and one goal in UEFA Europa League)	2	—		41	4
Bayer Leverkusen	2020–21	Bundesliga	21	0	—		3	1	1	0	—		25	1
Bayer Leverkusen	2021–22	Bundesliga	26	1	—		1	0	5	1	—		32	2
Bayer Leverkusen	2022–23	Bundesliga	10	1	—		1	1	4	0	—		15	2
Bayer Leverkusen	Total		168	10	—		16	4	30	4	—		214	18
Internacional	2023	Série A	22	0	—		0	0	6	0	—		28	0
Internacional	2024	Série A	7	0	12	1	2	0	2	0	—		22	1
Internacional	Total		29	0	12	1	2	0	8	0	—		50	1
Universidad de Chile	2024	Chilean Primera División	12	1	—		5	0	—		—		17	1
Universidad de Chile	2025	Chilean Primera División	6	2	—		2	0	1	1	—		9	3
Universidad de Chile	Total		18	3	—		7	0	1	1	—		26	4
Career total			334	38	26	4	43	7	89	10	3	0	495	60

=== International ===
As of match played 25 March 2025

Appearances and goals by national team and year
National team	Year	Apps	Goals
Chile	2009	1	0
Chile	2010	3	0
Chile	2011	2	0
Chile	2012	6	2
Chile	2013	6	0
Chile	2014	13	2
Chile	2015	9	2
Chile	2016	13	1
Chile	2017	12	0
Chile	2018	2	0
Chile	2019	11	0
Chile	2020	2	0
Chile	2021	12	0
Chile	2022	5	0
Chile	2023	4	0
Chile	2024	0	0
Chile	2025	2	0
Total		103	7

Scores and results list Chile's goal tally first, score column indicates score after each Aránguiz goal.

List of international goals scored by Charles Aránguiz
No.	Date	Venue	Opponent	Score	Result	Competition
1	2 June 2012	Estadio Hernando Siles, La Paz, Bolivia	Bolivia	1–0	2–0	2014 FIFA World Cup qualification
2	9 June 2012	Estadio José Antonio Anzoátegui, Puerto La Cruz, Venezuela	Venezuela	2–0	2–0	2014 FIFA World Cup qualification
3	18 June 2014	Estádio do Maracanã, Rio de Janeiro, Brazil	Spain	2–0	2–0	2014 FIFA World Cup
4	14 October 2014	Estadio Francisco Sánchez Rumoroso, Coquimbo, Chile	Bolivia	1–1	2–2	Friendly
5	19 June 2015	Estadio Nacional de Chile, Santiago, Chile	Bolivia	1–0	5–0	2015 Copa América
6	19 June 2015	Estadio Nacional de Chile, Santiago, Chile	Bolivia	3–0	5–0	2015 Copa América
7	22 June 2016	Soldier Field, Chicago, United States	Colombia	1–0	2–0	Copa América Centenario

== Honours ==
Colo-Colo

- Primera División de Chile: 2009 Clausura

Universidad de Chile

- Copa Sudamericana: 2011
- Primera División de Chile: 2011 Apertura, 2011 Clausura, 2012 Apertura
- Copa Chile: 2012–13
- Recopa Sudamericana runner-up: 2012
- Supercopa de Chile runner-up: 2013

Internacional

- Campeonato Gaúcho: 2014, 2015

Chile

- Copa del Pacífico: 2012
- Copa América: 2015, 2016

Individual

- Copa Sudamericana's Ideal Team: 2012, 2013
- America's Ideal Team: 2012
- Copa América Team of the Tournament: 2016
- Chilean Primera División Ideal Team: 2025
- Chilean Primera División Crack Player: 2025

== See also ==
- List of men's footballers with 100 or more international caps
