= Francisco Castro (footballer, born 1990) =

Chilean footballer

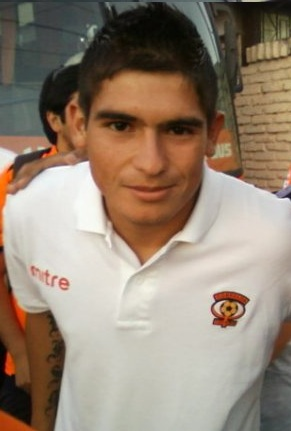

Personal information
- Full name: Francisco Fernando Castro Gamboa
- Date of birth: 4 September 1990 (age 36)
- Place of birth: Talagante, Santiago, Chile
- Height: 1.75 m (5 ft 9 in)
- Position: Winger

Team information
- Current team: Iberia
- Number: 33

Youth career
- 2005–2009: Cobreloa

Senior career*
Years	Team	Apps	(Gls)
2009–2010	Cobreloa	36	(2)
2010–2016	Universidad de Chile	77	(15)
2013	→ Unión Española (loan)	31	(4)
2014–2015	→ Deportes Iquique (loan)	31	(6)
2016–2017	Deportes Antofagasta	11	(0)
2017	Barnechea	13	(3)
2018	Unión La Calera	11	(1)
2018	Cobresal	20	(2)
2019	Santiago Wanderers	11	(1)
2020	Barnechea	14	(2)
2021	Cobreloa	10	(1)
2021–	Iberia	6	(3)

International career
2010	Chile	2	(0)
- * Club domestic league appearances and goals as of 18 January 2022

Francisco Fernando Castro Gamboa (born 4 September 1990 in Talagante, Chile) is a Chilean footballer who plays for Deportes Iberia in the Segunda División Profesional de Chile as a winger.

== Career ==
In 2009 Castro ascended to the first team of Cobreloa, after playing 4 years on the youth club. On 11 August 2010 he signed with Universidad de Chile with a free agent after leaving Cobreloa on his own, but after claims of the ANFP and Cobreloa the player didn't sign a contract with Universidad de Chile, and he returned to Cobreloa. On 18 August, Castro finally signed with Universidad de Chile after negotiations with Cobreloa, acquiring the 65% of the player, on 250.000 US dollars. He scored his first goal with La U in a match against Unión San Felipe, for the 2011 Copa Chile. He was the top-scorer of La U in the 2011 Torneo de Clausura with 8 goals.

== Honours ==
=== Club ===
Universidad de Chile

- Primera División de Chile (3): 2011 Apertura, 2011 Clausura, 2012 Apertura
- Copa Sudamericana (1): 2011
- Supercopa de Chile (1): 2015
- Copa Chile (1): 2015

Unión Española

- Primera División de Chile (1): 2013 Transición
