= Guillermo Marino =

Argentine footballer (born 1981)

Personal information
- Full name: Guillermo Andrés Marino
- Date of birth: 2 February 1981 (age 45)
- Place of birth: Los Surgentes, Argentina
- Height: 1.80 m (5 ft 11 in)
- Position: Midfielder

Youth career
- Newell's Old Boys

Senior career*
Years	Team	Apps	(Gls)
2000–2005	Newell's Old Boys	82	(11)
2005–2010	Boca Juniors	51	(4)
2007–2009	→ Tigres UANL (loan)	59	(4)
2010–2013	Universidad de Chile	90	(5)
2014	Boca Unidos	16	(0)
2015	Atlético de Rafaela	21	(2)
Total		319	(26)

Managerial career
- 2018–2019: Defensa y Justicia (assistant)
- 2019: Independiente (assistant)
- 2020–2021: Racing Club (assistant)
- 2021–2022: Defensa y Justicia (assistant)
- * Club domestic league appearances and goals

Guillermo Andrés Marino (born 2 February 1981) is an Argentine football coach and former player who played as a midfielder.

Marino was known for his teamwork and playmaking ability and could play in the center as well as on the wings.

== Career ==
Marino started his career with Newell's Old Boys in 2000, he helped the team to win the Apertura 2004. He then endured a six-month contract dispute with the club, he did not play for them again.

In 2005, he signed for Boca Juniors, he has suffered a number of injuries and has often been left out of the team, but he has helped the club to win five major titles.

In July 2007, he signed with Tigres UANL. After his spell in the Mexican side, he came back to Boca Juniors, where he was used mainly as a substitute for Juan Román Riquelme.

In 2010, after six months of being released from Boca Juniors and inactivity due to injuries, Marino signed a 3-year contract with Universidad de Chile. In his first season with the club, he struggled to obtain a spot in the main squad, mainly because of poor form. However, with the arrival of Jorge Sampaoli (who, at first, told him that he wasn't on his plans for the 2011 season) Marino began to improve his form and weight, and was one of the key players that helped the team to win the Apertura 2011.

In 2015, he joined to Atlético de Rafaela.

== Honours ==
Newell's Old Boys

- Argentina Primera División: 2004 Apertura

Boca Juniors

- Argentina Primera División: 2005 Apertura, 2006 Clausura
- Copa Libertadores: 2007
- Copa Sudamericana: 2005, 2006
- Recopa Sudamericana: 2005

Universidad de Chile

- Chilean Primera División: Apertura 2011, Clausura 2011, Apertura 2012
- Copa Sudamericana: 2011
