= Afro-Dutch people =

People of Sub-Saharan African ancestry in the Netherlands

Black Dutch
Zwarte Nederlanders (Dutch)

Regions with significant populations
- Primarily urban centers in South Holland, North Holland, Flevoland and Utrecht

Languages
- Primarily Dutch, Papiamentu, Sranan Tongo, English, Creole Languages

Religion
- Majority Christianity, minorities Islam, Irreligion and Traditional African religions

Afro-Dutch or Black Dutch people are Dutch people who are of Sub-Saharan African ancestry. The majority of Afro-Dutch in the Netherlands are Afro-Caribbean and hail from the former and present Dutch overseas territories Suriname and the former Netherlands Antilles (mostly from Curaçao, Aruba and St Maarten). Of the approximately 500,000 Afro-Dutch people, about 300,000 people, or 60%, are from these territories. Whilst only a minority of Black Dutch citizens are of Sub-Saharan African migrant background, there is a sizable population of Cape Verdean, Ghanaian, Nigerian, Somali, Angolan and other African communities of more recent immigrants. The majority of Afro-Dutch people migrated to the Netherlands from the 1970s onwards, most of the recent migrants arriving either as political refugees seeking freedom or, more often, to escape regional conflicts, such as from Eritrea.

There is also the Afro-Dutch Sephardic Diaspora of Barbados, who were historically part of the Dutch West India Company's infrastructure whose members travelled to and from The Netherlands and its Colonial Territories.

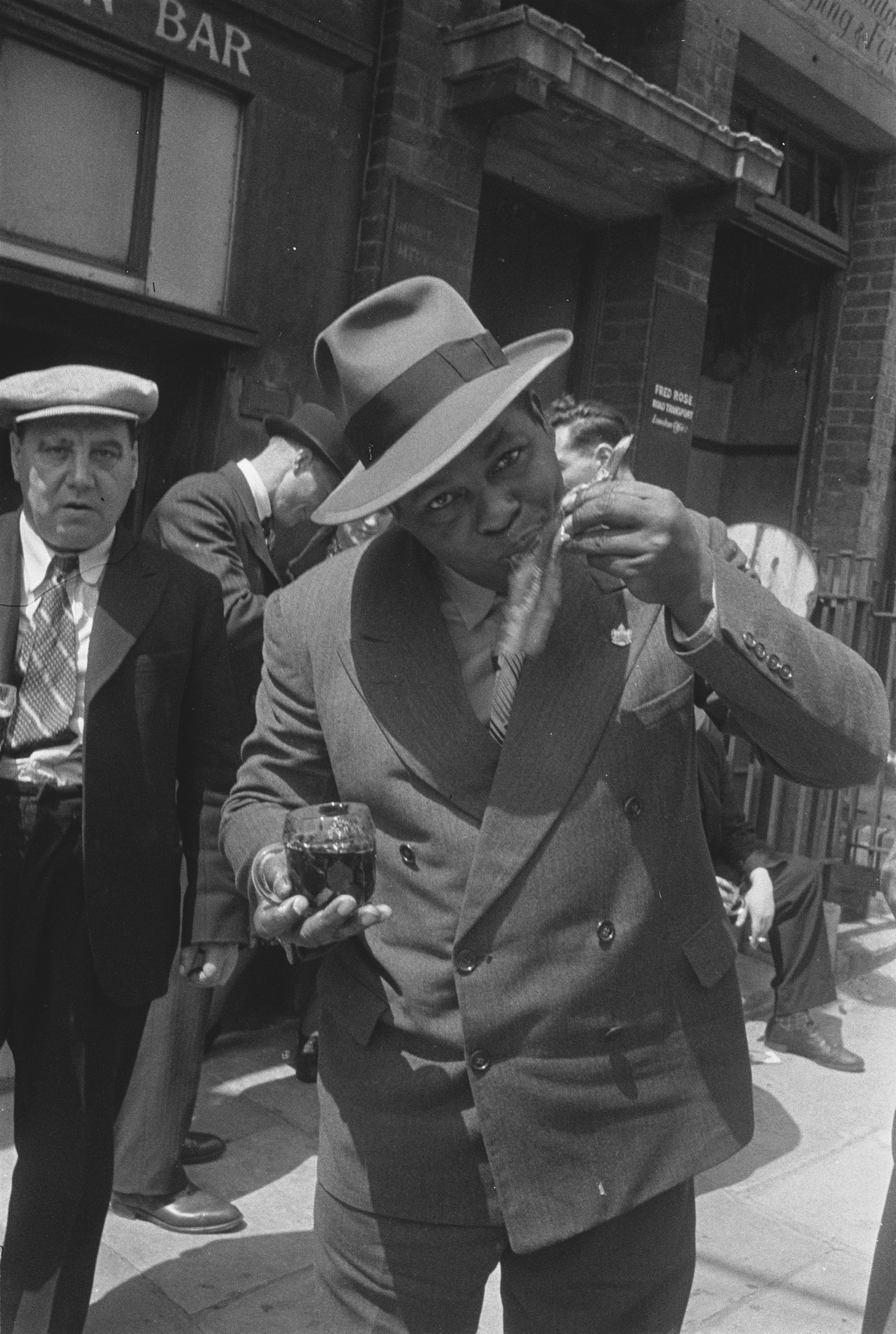
A Black Dutch merchant seaman eating maatjesharing in London, June 1943

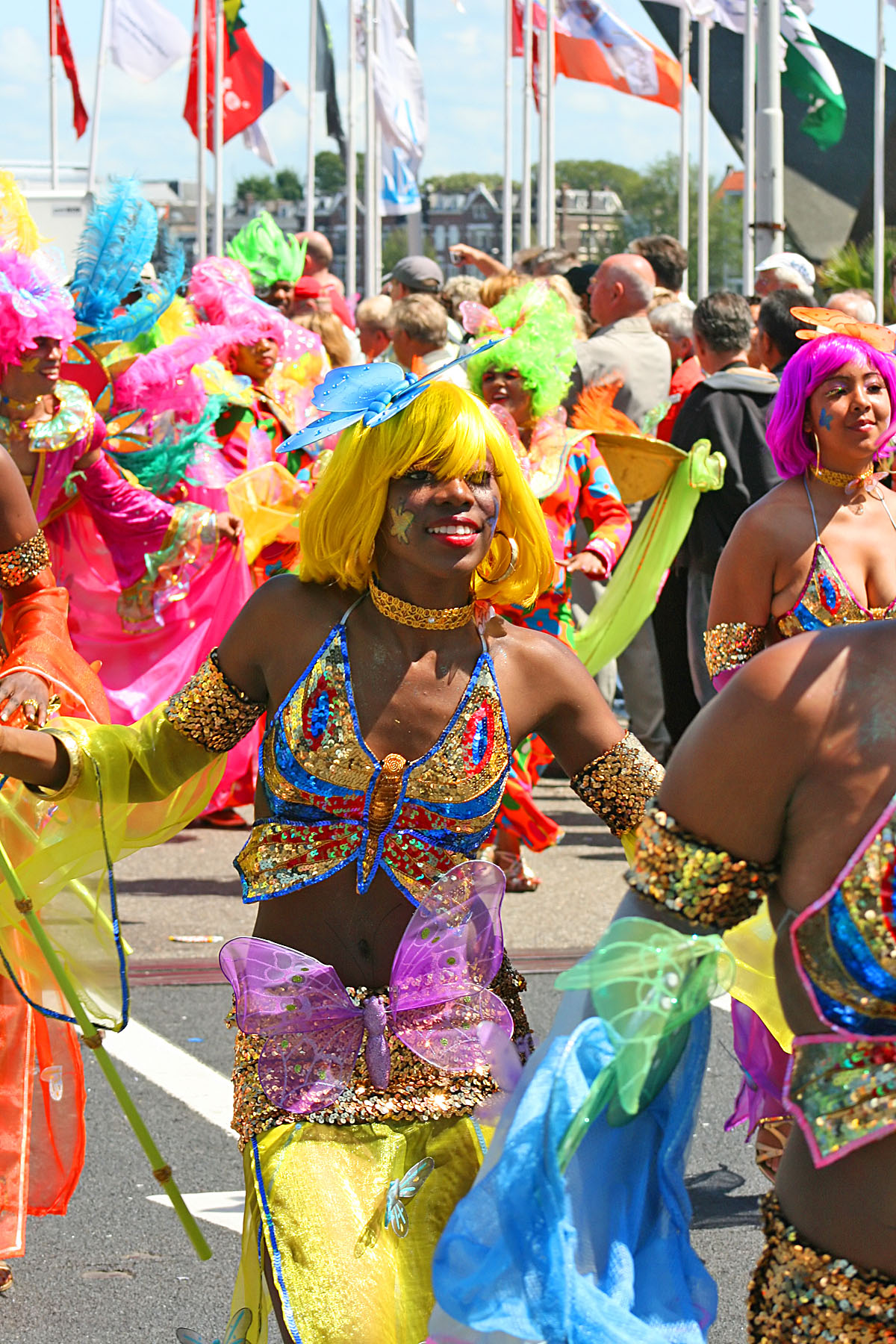
Zomercarnaval 2007

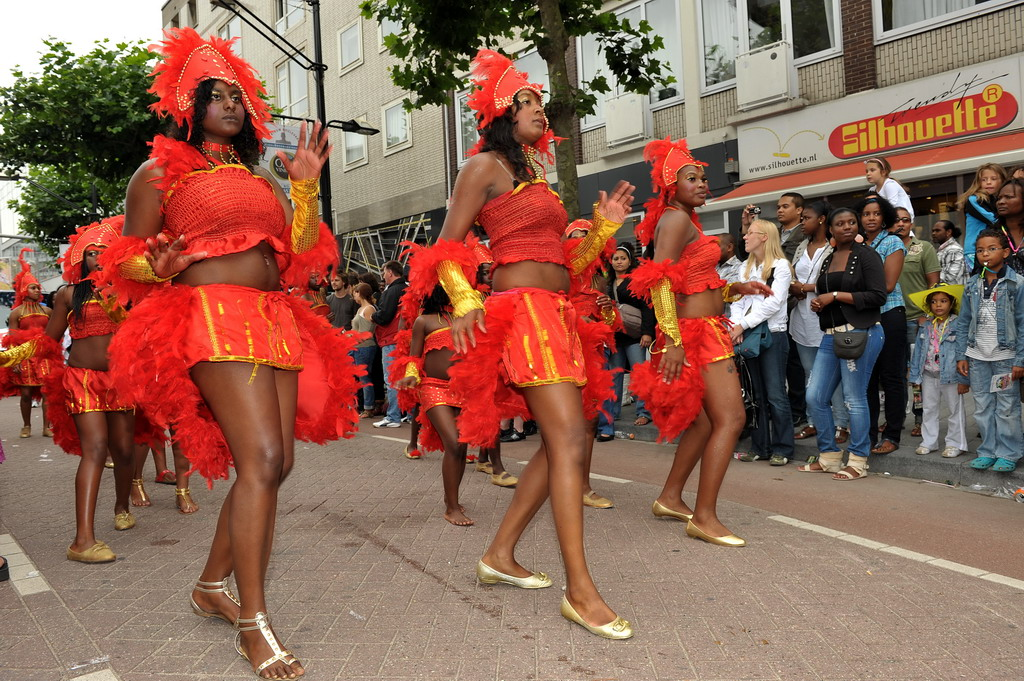
Summer Carnival in Rotterdam

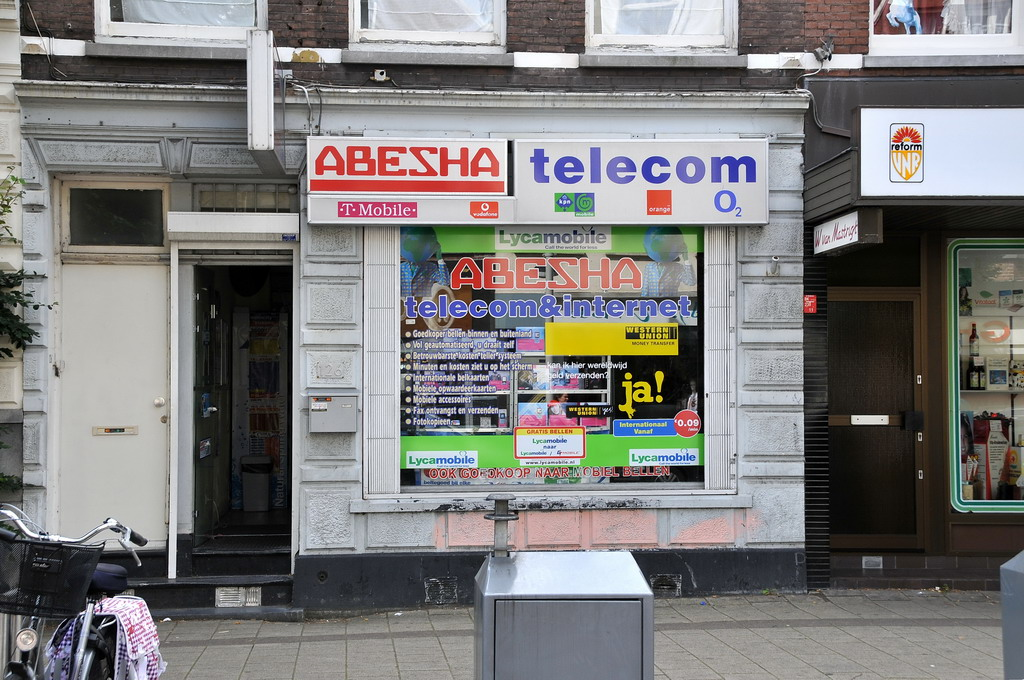
Somali telecommunications store in Rotterdam, 2010

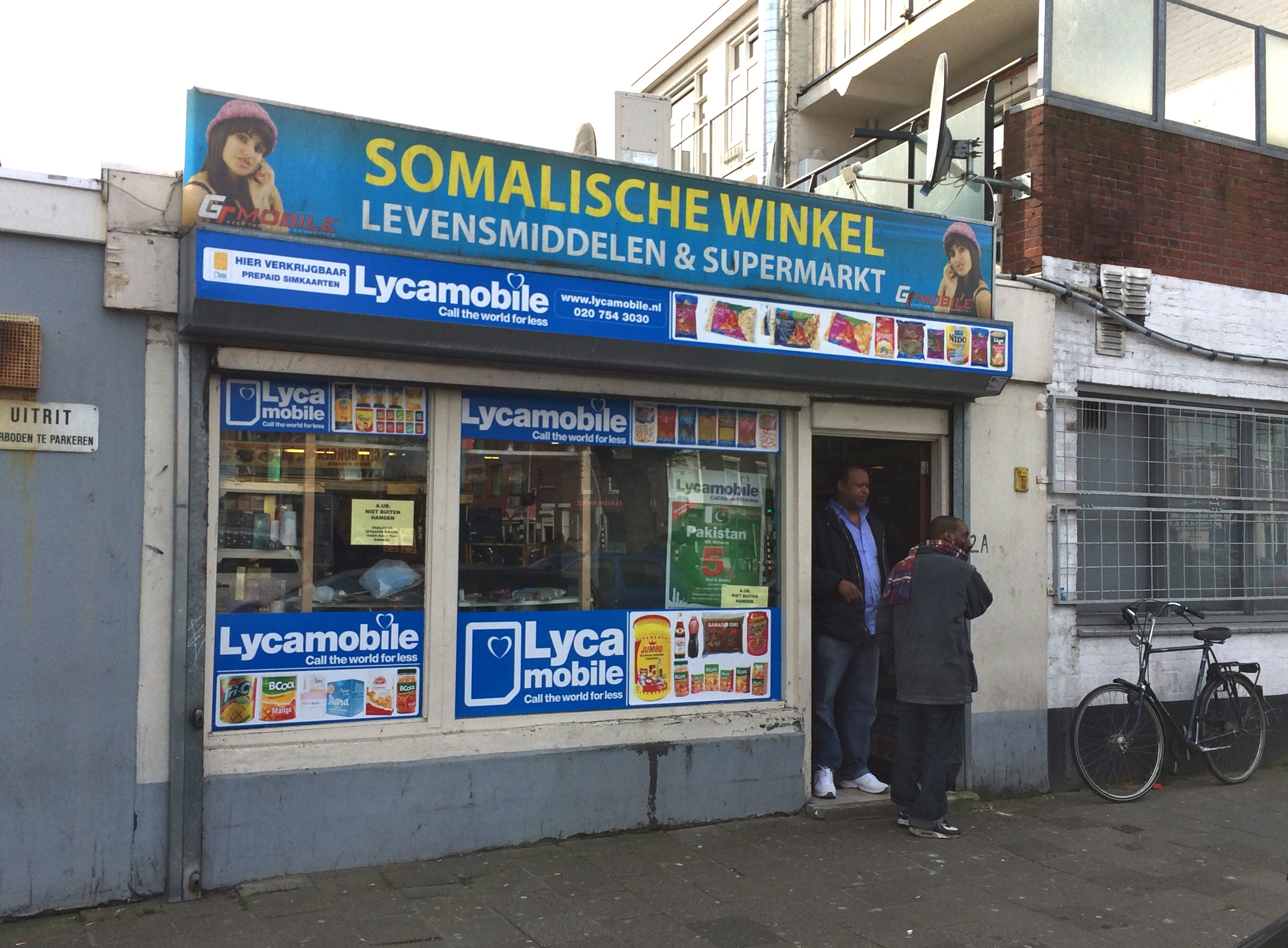
Somali grocery store in The Hague, 2015

The earliest documented arrival of a Black person in the Netherlands occurred in November 1596. A group of approximately 100 Black men, women and children from Angola arrived at the port city of Middelburg in the province of Zeeland, brought by Dutch expeditions returning from overseas. Upon their arrival, local authorities declared them free, citing that there was no slavery in Zeeland and that the individuals were baptized Christians. For the context of individual arrivals, records suggest isolated visits by Black African servants and noblemen, such as those depicted in European portraiture, occurred in the broader Low Countries as early as the 1520s.

== Demographics ==
Sub-Saharan African population in 2021
Somalia	East Africa	41,064
South Africa	Southern Africa	31,693
Ethiopia	East Africa	28,635
Ghana	West Africa	26,694
Eritrea	East Africa	25,080
Cape Verde	West Africa	23,150
Nigeria	West Africa	16,140
Angola	Southern Africa	9,363
Democratic Republic of the Congo	Central Africa	8,827
Sudan	North Africa	8,744
Sierra Leone	West Africa	5,869
Kenya	East Africa	5,182
Guinea	West Africa	4,854
Cameroon	Central Africa	3,481
Burundi	East Africa	3,374
Liberia	West Africa	3,080
Zimbabwe	Southern Africa	2,660
Tanzania	East Africa	2,479
Senegal	West Africa	2,164
Ivory Coast	West Africa	2,057
Togo	West Africa	1,966
Gambia	West Africa	1,940
Rwanda	East Africa	1,755
Zambia	Southern Africa	1,732
Republic of the Congo	Central Africa	1,545
Mozambique	Southern Africa	1,137
Mauritius	Southern Africa	732
Burkina Faso	West Africa	715
Malawi	Southern Africa	546
Benin	West Africa	494
Guinea-Bissau	West Africa	473
Mauritania	West Africa	434
Niger	West Africa	409
Mali	West Africa	381
Madagascar	Southern Africa	347
São Tomé and Príncipe	Central Africa	313
Botswana	Southern Africa	298
Djibouti	East Africa	267
Chad	North Africa	194
Gabon	Central Africa	166
Eswatini	Southern Africa	154
Lesotho	Southern Africa	140
Seychelles	East Africa	129
Central African Republic	Central Africa	106
Equatorial Guinea	Central Africa	79
South Sudan	East Africa	30
Comoros	East Africa	22
Total:		266,216

Country	Ethnic group	Native languages	
Suriname	Afro-Surinamese	Sranan Tongo and Surinamese Dutch (Maroons: Ndyuka, Saramaccan, Kwinti, Aluku)	170,565
Former Netherlands Antilles & Dutch Mercantile Enclaves "Trade posts"
Country	Ethnic group	Native languages	
Curaçao	Afro-Curaçaoans	Papiamentu	131,360
Aruba	Afro-Arubans	Papiamento	4,360
Bonaire Sint Eustatius Saba		Papiamentu (Bonaire) and English (Saba and Sint Eustatius)	6,080
Sint Maarten	Sint Maarteners	Saint Martin English	4,904
Total:			146,704

Afro-Caribbean people
Country	Ethnic group	Native languages	
Dominican Republic	Afro-Dominicans	Dominican Spanish	16,303
Cuba	Afro-Cubans	Cuban Spanish	2,645
Jamaica	Afro-Jamaicans	Jamaican English and Jamaican Patois	1,917
Trinidad and Tobago	Afro–Trinidadians and Tobagonians	Trinidadian and Tobagonian English, Trinidadian Creole and Tobagonian Creole	1,203
Haiti	Afro-Haitians	Haitian French and Haitian Creole	984
Guadeloupe		French and Antillean Creole	454
Puerto Rico	Afro–Puerto Ricans	Puerto Rican Spanish	256
Barbados	Afro-Barbadians	Barbadian English and Bajan Creole	164
Barbados	Afro-Dutch Sephardim	Barbadian English and Bajan Creole	Unknown
Dominica	Afro-Dominicans	Dominican English and Dominican Creole	143
Martinique		French and Antillean Creole	129
Saint Lucia	Afro–Saint Lucians	Saint Lucian English and Saint Lucian Creole	118
Saint Kitts and Nevis	Afro–Kittitians and Nevisians	Saint Kitts and Nevis English and Creole	116
Saint Vincent and the Grenadines	Afro-Vincentians	Vincentian English and Vincentian Creole	116
The Bahamas	Afro-Bahamians	Bahamian English and Bahamian Creole	113
Grenada	Afro-Grenadians	Grenadian English and Grenadian Creole English	68
Bermuda	Afro-Bermudians	Bermudian English	65
Antigua and Barbuda	Afro–Antiguans and Barbudans	English and Antiguan and Barbudan Creole	55
United States Virgin Islands		Virgin Islands English and Virgin Islands Creole	31
Anguilla	Afro-Anguillians	Anguillian English and Anguillian Creole	28
Cayman Islands	Afro-Caymanian	Caymanian English	24
British Virgin Islands		Virgin Islands English and Virgin Islands Creole	22
Montserrat		Montserratian English	12
Turks and Caicos Islands	Afro-Turks and Caicos Islanders	English and Turks and Caicos Creole	1
Total:			

== Notable Afro-Dutch people ==
- Amourricho van Axel Dongen
- Abel Tamata
- Ahmad Mendes Moreira
- Alfons Fosu-Mensah
- Andro Franca
- Arnaut Danjuma
- Ayouba Kosiah
- Bradley Martis
- Calvin Stengs
- Charlton Vicento
- Cecílio Lopes
- Dabney dos Santos
- Trevor Doornbusch
- Danny Hoesen
- Devyne Rensch
- Deabeas Owusu-Sekyere
- Diego Biseswar
- Djenairo Daniels
- Dominique Kivuvu
- Donyell Malen
- Danzell Gravenberch
- Derwin Martina
- Deroy Duarte
- Dillon Hoogewerf
- Dwayne Green
- Dylan Timber
- Eloy Room
- Elvis Manu
- Emanuel Emegha
- Ernest Poku
- Erol Erdal Alkan
- Felitciano Zschusschen
- Fernando Lewis
- Ferne Snoyl
- Fodé Fofana
- Genaro Snijders
- Gerson Sheotahul
- Gervane Kastaneer
- Gévero Markiet
- Gregor Breinburg
- Gianni dos Santos
- Gino Coutinho
- Gigli Ndefe
- Glynor Plet
- Hennos Asmelash
- Iman Griffith
- Joël Donald
- Joël Zwarts
- Justin Lonwijk
- Kay Tejan
- Kenny Teijsse
- Kevin Felida
- Kyvon Leidsman
- Laros Duarte
- Lerin Duarte
- Lassana Faye
- Nathan Aké
- Lorenzo Burnet, footballer
- Patrick van Aanholt, footballer
- Pele van Anholt
- Romano Denneboom
- Clark Accord, novelist
- Afrojack, DJ
- Jandino Asporaat, comedian
- Sergio Babb, footballer
- Ryan Babel, footballer
- Winston Bogarde, footballer
- Enith Brigitha, swimmer
- Paul Fosu-Mensah
- Remy Bonjasky, kickboxer
- Jeffrey Sarpong
- Jerson Cabral, footballer
- Ellery Cairo, footballer
- Derrick Luckassen
- Don Ceder, parliamentarian
- Nelli Cooman, athlete
- Dyron Daal, footballer
- Manu Dagher, footballer
- Edgar Davids, footballer
- Memphis Depay, footballer
- Def Rhymz, rapper
- Virgil van Dijk, footballer
- Royston Drenthe, footballer
- Anita Doth, lead singer of 2 Unlimited
- Denzel Dumfries, footballer
- Boy Ecury, member of the Dutch Resistance in World War II
- Dwight Eind, footballer
- Dwight Eli, footballer
- Francisco Elson, basketball player
- Winston Faerber, footballer
- Raymond Fafiani, footballer
- Ronnie Flex, rapper
- Timothy Fosu-Mensah, footballer
- Dan Gadzuric, basketball player
- Cody Gakpo, footballer of Togolese and Ghanaian descent
- Quinsy Gario, activist
- Leroy George, footballer
- Luc Castaignos
- Ulrich van Gobbel, footballer
- Glennis Grace, singer
- Ryan Gravenberch, footballer
- Laetitia Griffith, politician
- Murthel Groenhart, kickboxer
- Ruud Gullit, footballer
- Hanne Hagary, footballer
- Warner Hahn, footballer
- Sifan Hassan, middle- and long-distance runner
- Youssouf Hersi, footballer
- Ayaan Hirsi Ali, politician
- Ernesto Hoost, kickboxer
- Habtamu de Hoop, parliamentarian
- Raily Ignacio, footballer
- Ruth Jacott, singer
- Quentin Jakoba, footballer
- Luciano van Kallen, footballer
- Leandro Kappel, footballer
- Kempi, rapper
- Justin Kluivert, footballer
- Patrick Kluivert, footballer
- Anton de Kom, resistance fighter and author
- Natalie La Rose, singer
- Darryl Lachman, footballer
- Michael Lamey, footballer
- Jeroen Lumu, Footballer
- Lepejou, former slave
- Darren Maatsen, footballer
- Ian Maatsen
- Ingmar Maayen, footballer
- Lils Mackintosh, jazz and blues singer
- Melvin Manhoef, kickboxer and mixed martial artist
- Churandy Martina, athlete
- Bruno Martins Indi, footballer
- Stanley Menzo, footballer
- Humphrey Mijnals, footballer
- Kenneth Monkou, footballer
- Kiki Musampa, footballer
- Furdjel Narsingh, footballer
- Luciano Narsingh, footballer
- Dai Dai N'tab, long track speed skater
- Marcel Oerlemans, footballer
- Alistair Overeem, mixed martial artist and kickboxer
- Valentijn Overeem, mixed martial artist and kickboxer
- Shane Parris, footballer
- Raffaela Paton, singer
- Mr Probz, singer
- Quincy Promes, footballer
- Prince Rajcomar, footballer
- Jörgen Raymann, cabaretier, stand-up comedian and TV presenter
- Frank Rijkaard, footballer
- Lucia Rijker, kickboxer
- Kamohelo Mokotjo, footballer
- Lesley de Sa, footballer
- Clarence Seedorf, footballer
- Eva Simons, singer
- Sylvana Simons, politician and television presenter
- Ricardo Talu, footballer
- Humberto Tan, television presenter and sports journalist
- Patrick Tilon, rapper
- Regilio Tuur, boxer
- Mikal Tseggai, politician
- Typhoon, rapper
- Rodney Ubbergen, footballer
- U-Niq, rapper
- Guus Uhlenbeek, footballer
- João Varela (politician), politician and journalist
- Jahri Valentijn, footballer
- Arsenio Valpoort, footballer
- Byron Ward, baseball player
- Boy Waterman, footballer
- Georginio Wijnaldum, footballer
- Jason Wilnis, kickboxer
- Jahfarr Wilnis, kickboxer
- Jetro Willems, footballer
- Winne, rapper
- Jorien Wuite, parliamentarian
- Lily Yohannes, footballer
- Gilbert Yvel, mixed martial artist and kickboxer
- Melvin Zaalman, footballer
- Genero Zeefuik, footballer
- Errol Zimmerman, kickboxer
- Alain Clark, singer
- Pablo Rosario, Footballer of Dominican descent
- Armando Obispo, Footballer
- Ché Nunnely, Footballer
- Xavier Mbuyamba, Footballer
- Franc Weerwind, First Black cabinet minister
- Jahnoah Markelo
- Jermaine Windster
- Kilian Nikiema
- Crysencio Summerville
- Jayden Oosterwolde
- Jeffrey Bruma
- Jordan Teze
- Kew Jaliens
- Mitchell Piqué
- Noa Lang
- Gibson Yah
- Owen Wijndal
- Quincy Owusu-Abeyie
- Regillio Simons
- Regillio Nooitmeer
- Riechedly Bazoer
- Shaquille Pinas
- Tonny Vilhena
- Tyronne Ebuehi
- Xavi Simons
- Jaïro Riedewald
- Jaron Vicario
- Jerry St. Juste
- Joshua Brenet
- Josh Zirkzee
- Kenny Tete
- Leandro Fernandes
- Rashaan Fernandes
- Tyrell Malacia
- Melvin Kingsale
- Michael Reiziger
- Endy Opoku Bernadina
- Jay-Roy Grot
- Juan Castillo
- Liban Abdulahi
- Hamdi Akujobi
- Nathangelo Markelo
- Noah Ohio
- Quilindschy Hartman
- Rydell Poepon
- Stevy Okitokandjo
- Stefano Denswil
- Ibad Muhamadu
- Immanuel Pherai
- Ki-Jana Hoever
- Kyle Ebecilio
- Mitchell Donald
- Roly Bonevacia
- Ridgeciano Haps
- Sergiño Dest
- Shurandy Sambo
- Steven Bergwijn
- Jean-Paul Boëtius
- Jeremie Frimpong
- Maceo Rigters
- Mario Melchiot
- Pierre Van Hooijdonk
- Ramon Leeuwin
- Rodney Kongolo
- Roland Alberg
- Harvey Esajas
- Daishawn Redan
- Iwan Redan
- Jarchinio Antonia
- Jurriën Timber
- Marino Promes
- Quinten Timber
- Ryan Koolwijk
- Sylla Sow
- Myron Boadu
- Nigel Lonwijk
- Virgil Misidjan
- Lorenzo Ebecilio
- Luciano Slagveer
- Sydney van Hooijdonk
- William Troost-Ekong
- Million Manhoef
- Terrence Douglas
- Marvin Zeegelaar
- Milano Koenders
- Milan van Ewijk
- Navajo Bakboord
- Rajiv van La Parra
- Ricardo van Rhijn
- Willie Overtoom
- Edwin Gyasi
- Raymond Gyasi
- Javairô Dilrosun
- Johan Kappelhof
- Lorenzo Piqué
- Richairo Živković
- Serginho Greene
- Sheraldo Becker
- Sontje Hansen
- Tjaronn Chery
- Henk Bos
- Jorrel Hato
- Kevin Bobson
- Mawouna Amevor
- Nuelson Wau
- Robin Nelisse

== Bibliography ==
- Appiah, Kwame Anthony and Gates, Henry Louis, Jr.(1999). Africana: the Encyclopedia of African and African American Experience. Basic Civitas Books, pp. 1413–1416. ISBN 0-465-00071-1.
- Gowricharn, Ruben S. ( 2006 ). Caribbean Transnationalism: Migration, Pluralization, and Social Cohesion. Lexington Books.

== See also ==
- Zwarte Hollanders
