= Colin Odutayo =

Dutch footballer (born 2001)

Personal information
- Full name: Colin Lapido Odutayo
- Date of birth: 8 March 2001 (age 25)
- Place of birth: Roermond, Netherlands
- Position: Winger

Team information
- Current team: Schaffhausen
- Number: 11

Youth career
- Fortuna Sittard
- –2017: Genk
- 2017–2020: Aston Villa
- 2021–2022: Roda JC

Senior career*
Years	Team	Apps	(Gls)
2022	Neptūnas	8	(8)
2023	Riteriai	31	(3)
2024	Lahti	11	(3)
2024–2025	Aarau	15	(1)
2025–	Schaffhausen	26	(7)
- * Club domestic league appearances and goals as of 30 September 2026

Colin Lapido Odutayo (born 8 March 2001) is a Dutch professional footballer who plays as a winger for Swiss Promotion League club Schaffhausen.

== Career ==
After having played for youth sectors of Fortuna Sittard, Genk, Aston Villa and Roda JC, Odutayo moved to Lithuania in the summer 2022 and signed with FK Neptūnas for the rest of the season. Later he made his senior debut with the team in second-tier I Lyga.

For the 2023 season, he signed with A Lyga club FK Riteriai.

On 16 January 2024, Odutayo joined FC Lahti in Finnish top-tier Veikkausliiga, signing a one-year deal with an option to extend. He scored his first goal for FC Lahti on 3 February, a winning goal against Ekenäs IF in a 2–1 win in Finnish League Cup. On 12 May, Odutayo scored his first goal in Veikkausliiga on the penalty spot, in a 3–0 home win against IFK Mariehamn.

On 19 August, Odutayo was released by Lahti, and subsequently he signed with Swiss Challenge League club Aarau on a two-year deal with an option to extend.

On 3 July 2025, Odutayo switched teams again, this team to Swiss third-tier club Schaffhausen.

== Personal life ==
Born in Netherlands, Odutayo is of Nigerian descent. His brothers Quincy and Henry are also footballers.

== Career statistics ==
As of 2 June 2025

Appearances and goals by club, season and competition
Club	Season	League			National cup (Note: Includes Lithuanian Cup, Suomen Cup and Swiss Cup)		League cup (Note: Includes Finnish League Cup)		Europe		Other		Total	
Club	Season	Division	Apps	Goals	Apps	Goals	Apps	Goals	Apps	Goals	Apps	Goals	Apps	Goals
Aston Villa U23	2019–20	—									1 (Note: Appearance(s) in EFL Trophy)	0	1	0
Neptūnas	2022	I Lyga	8	8	—		—		—		—		8	8
Riteriai	2023	A Lyga	31	3	3	1	—		—		—		34	4
Lahti	2024	Veikkausliiga	11	3	3	0	6	4	—		—		20	7
Aarau	2024–25	Swiss Challenge League	15	1	2	0	—		—		2 (Note: Includes Swiss Super League promotion play-offs)	0	19	1
Schaffhausen	2025–26	Swiss Promotion League	0	0	0	0	—		—		—		0	0
Career total			65	15	8	1	6	4	0	0	3	0	83	20

== Honours ==
Neptūnas

- I Lyga runner-up: 2022
