= 2021–22 Bayer 04 Leverkusen season =

Bayer 04 Leverkusen
2021–22 season
- Administration: Fernando Carro (CEO); Rudi Völler (Managing Director Sports)
- Head coach: Gerardo Seoane
- Stadium: BayArena
- Bundesliga: 3rd
- DFB-Pokal: Second round
- UEFA Europa League: Round of 16
- Top goalscorer: League: Patrik Schick (24); All: Patrik Schick (24)
- Biggest win: Bayer Leverkusen 7–1 Greuther Fürth
- Biggest defeat: Bayer Leverkusen 1–5 Bayern Munich
colours	Away colours	Third colours

The 2021–22 season was the 118th season in the existence of Bayer 04 Leverkusen and the club's 43rd consecutive season in the top flight of German football. In addition to the domestic league, Leverkusen participated in this season's edition of the DFB-Pokal and the UEFA Europa League.

== Players ==
=== First-team squad ===
As of 30 January 2022

Note: Flags indicate national team as defined under FIFA eligibility rules; some limited exceptions apply. Players may hold more than one non-FIFA nationality.

No.	Pos.	Nation	Player
1	GK	FIN	Lukas Hradecky (captain)
4	DF	GER	Jonathan Tah (3rd captain)
5	DF	NED	Mitchel Bakker
6	DF	CIV	Odilon Kossounou
7	FW	BRA	Paulinho
8	MF	GER	Robert Andrich
9	FW	IRI	Sardar Azmoun
10	MF	GER	Kerem Demirbay
12	DF	BFA	Edmond Tapsoba
13	FW	ARG	Lucas Alario
14	FW	CZE	Patrik Schick
15	MF	AUT	Julian Baumgartlinger (vice-captain)
19	FW	FRA	Moussa Diaby
20	MF	CHI	Charles Aránguiz (4th captain)

No.	Pos.	Nation	Player
21	GK	GER	Lennart Grill
22	DF	NED	Daley Sinkgraven
24	DF	NED	Timothy Fosu-Mensah
25	MF	ARG	Exequiel Palacios
27	MF	GER	Florian Wirtz
29	MF	DEN	Zidan Sertdemir
30	DF	NED	Jeremie Frimpong
31	FW	FRA	Amine Adli
32	MF	MAR	Ayman Azhil
33	DF	ECU	Piero Hincapié
36	GK	GER	Niklas Lomb
37	FW	GER	Emrehan Gedikli
38	MF	GER	Karim Bellarabi
40	GK	RUS	Andrey Lunyov

=== Players out on loan ===
Note: Flags indicate national team as defined under FIFA eligibility rules; some limited exceptions apply. Players may hold more than one non-FIFA nationality.

No.	Pos.	Nation	Player
—	FW	GER	Yannik Schlößer (at 1. FC Nürnberg until 30 June 2022)
11	MF	GER	Nadiem Amiri (at Genoa until 30 June 2022)
17	FW	FIN	Joel Pohjanpalo (at Çaykur Rizespor until 30 June 2022)
23	DF	GER	Mitchell Weiser (at Werder Bremen until 30 June 2022)

== Transfers ==
=== In ===
No.	Pos.	Player	Transferred from	Fee	Date	Source
29	MF	(Denmark) Zidan Sertdemir	(Denmark) Nordsjælland U19	€2,500,000	1 July 2021	
40	GK	(Russia) Andrey Lunyov	(Russia) Zenit Saint Petersburg	Free	10 July 2021	
5	DF	(Netherlands) Mitchel Bakker	(France) Paris Saint-Germain	€7,000,000	12 July 2021	
6	DF	(Ivory Coast) Odilon Kossounou	(Belgium) Club Brugge	€23,000,000	22 July 2021	
8	MF	(Germany) Robert Andrich	(Germany) Union Berlin	€6,500,000	16 August 2021	
33	DF	(Ecuador) Piero Hincapié	(Argentina) Talleres	€6,350,000	16 August 2021	
31	FW	(France) Amine Adli	(France) Toulouse	€15,000,000	26 August 2021	
9	FW	(Iran) Sardar Azmoun	(Russia) Zenit Saint Petersburg	€4,000,000	30 January 2022	

=== Out ===
No.	Pos.	Player	Transferred to	Fee	Date	Source
5	MF	(Germany) Sven Bender	N/A	Retired	1 July 2021	
6	DF	(Austria) Aleksandar Dragović	(Serbia) Red Star Belgrade	Free	1 July 2021	
8	MF	(Germany) Lars Bender	N/A	Retired	1 July 2021	
	FW	(Germany) Yannik Schlößer	(Germany) 1. FC Nürnberg	Loan	9 July 2021	
32	FW	(Turkey) Samed Onur	(Turkey) Fatih Karagümrük	Free	12 July 2021	
39	MF	(Turkey) Cem Türkmen	(France) Clermont	Free	12 July 2021	
28	MF	(England) Demarai Gray	(England) Everton	€2,000,000	22 July 2021	
16	DF	(Croatia) Tin Jedvaj	(Russia) Lokomotiv Moscow	€4,000,000	24 July 2021	
9	FW	(Jamaica) Leon Bailey	(England) Aston Villa	€32,000,000	4 August 2021	
18	DF	(Brazil) Wendell	(Portugal) Porto	€4,000,000	19 August 2021	
21	GK	(Germany) Lennart Grill	(Norway) Brann	Loan	30 August 2021	
23	DF	(Germany) Mitchell Weiser	(Germany) Werder Bremen	Loan	31 August 2021	
17	FW	(Finland) Joel Pohjanpalo	(Turkey) Çaykur Rizespor	Loan	5 September 2021	
3	DF	(Greece) Panagiotis Retsos	(Italy) Hellas Verona	Free	25 January 2022	
11	MF	(Germany) Nadiem Amiri	(Italy) Genoa	Loan	29 January 2022	
37	FW	(Germany) Emrehan Gedikli	(Turkey) Trabzonspor	€800,000	7 February 2022	

== Pre-season and friendlies ==
Win Draw Loss Fixtures

14 July 2021 Friendly	Bayer Leverkusen	Cancelled	Wehen Wiesbaden	Cologne, Germany
18:00 CEST (UTC+2)				Stadium: Leistungszentrum Kurtekotten

18 July 2021 Friendly	Bayer Leverkusen	Cancelled	Dynamo Moscow	Zell am See, Austria
15:00 CEST (UTC+2)				Stadium: Alois Latini Stadion

23 July 2021 Friendly	Bayer Leverkusen	0–0	SC Freiburg	Wattens, Austria
14:00 CEST (UTC+2)		Report		Stadium: Gernot Langes Stadion; Attendance: 500

28 July 2021 Friendly	Bayer Leverkusen	1–5	FC Utrecht	Leverkusen, Germany
16:00 CEST (UTC+2)	Bakker 50'	Report	Kerk 55', 71'; Balk 102'; Dalmau 128' (pen.), 133' (pen.)	Stadium: BayArena; Attendance: 350; Referee: Niklas Dardenne
Note: The match was played in three periods of 45 minutes each.

31 July 2021 Friendly	Bayer Leverkusen	3–1	Oberhausen	Leverkusen, Germany
14:00 CEST (UTC+2)	Alario 10', 14'; Schick 40'	Report	Oubeyapwa 47'	Stadium: BayArena; Attendance: 400; Referee: Robert Kampka

31 July 2021 Friendly	Bayer Leverkusen	Cancelled	Celta Vigo	Leverkusen, Germany
16:00 CEST (UTC+2)				Stadium: BayArena

17 May 2022 Friendly	Deportivo Toluca	1–0	Bayer Leverkusen	Toluca, Mexico
20:00 CDT (UTC−5)	Canelo 44'	Report		Stadium: Estadio Nemesio Díez; Attendance: 30,000; Referee: Adonai Escobedo

== Competitions ==
=== Overall record ===
Competition	First match	Last match	Starting round	Final position	Record							
Competition	First match	Last match	Starting round	Final position	Pld	W	D	L	GF	GA	GD	Win %
Bundesliga	14 August 2021	14 May 2022	Matchday 1	3rd	34	19	7	8	80	47	+33	55.88
DFB-Pokal	7 August 2021	27 October 2021	First round	Second round	2	1	0	1	4	2	+2	50.00
UEFA Europa League	16 September 2021	17 March 2022	Group stage	Round of 16	8	4	1	3	16	9	+7	50.00
Total					44	24	8	12	100	58	+42	54.55

Source: Soccerway

=== Bundesliga ===
==== League table ====
Pos	Team	Pld	W	D	L	GF	GA	GD	Pts	Qualification or relegation
1	Bayern Munich (C)	34	24	5	5	97	37	+60	77	Qualification for the Champions League group stage
2	Borussia Dortmund	34	22	3	9	85	52	+33	69	Qualification for the Champions League group stage
3	Bayer Leverkusen	34	19	7	8	80	47	+33	64	Qualification for the Champions League group stage
4	RB Leipzig	34	17	7	10	72	37	+35	58	Qualification for the Champions League group stage
5	Union Berlin	34	16	9	9	50	44	+6	57	Qualification for the Europa League group stage (Note: Since the 2021–22 DFB-Pokal winners, RB Leipzig, qualified for the Champions League based on league position, the Europa League group stage spot was passed to the sixth-placed team, and the Europa Conference League play-off round spot was passed to the seventh-placed team.)

Source: DFB
Rules for classification: 1) Points; 2) Goal difference; 3) Goals scored; 4) Head-to-head results; 5) Head-to-head away goals scored; 6) Away goals scored; 7) Play-off.
(C) Champions

==== Results summary ====
Overall								Home						Away					
Pld	W	D	L	GF	GA	GD	Pts	W	D	L	GF	GA	GD	W	D	L	GF	GA	GD
34	19	7	8	80	47	+33	64	10	2	5	40	24	+16	9	5	3	40	23	+17

Source: DFB

==== Results by round ====
Round	1	2	3	4	5	6	7	8	9	10	11	12	13	14	15	16	17	18	19	20	21	22	23	24	25	26	27	28	29	30	31	32	33	34
Ground	A	H	A	H	A	H	A	H	A	H	A	H	A	H	A	H	A	H	A	H	A	H	A	H	A	H	A	H	A	H	A	H	A	H
Result	D	W	W	L	W	W	W	L	D	L	D	W	W	W	L	D	L	D	W	W	W	W	L	W	D	L	W	W	D	L	W	W	W	W
Position	7	3	2	6	4	2	2	3	4	4	6	4	3	3	3	3	4	5	3	3	3	3	3	3	3	3	3	3	3	4	3	3	3	3

Source: DFB
A = Away; H = Home; W = Win; D = Draw; L = Loss

==== Matches ====
The league fixtures were announced on 25 June 2021.

14 August 2021 1	Union Berlin	1–1	Bayer Leverkusen	Berlin
15:30 CEST (UTC+2)	Awoniyi 7'	Report	Diaby 12', (yellow card) 28'	Stadium: Stadion An der Alten Försterei; Attendance: 11,000; Referee: Tobias Reichel

21 August 2021 2	Bayer Leverkusen	4–0	Borussia Mönchengladbach	Leverkusen
18:30 CEST (UTC+2)	Sommer 3' (o.g.); Schick 8'; Demirbay (yellow card) 34'; Bakker (yellow card) 41'; Paulinho (yellow card) 48'; Diaby 55', (yellow card) 90+1'; Amiri 87'	Report	Stindl (penalty missed) 43'; Kramer (yellow card) 75'; Wolf (yellow card) 76'	Stadium: BayArena; Attendance: 15,105; Referee: Deniz Aytekin

28 August 2021 3	FC Augsburg	1–4	Bayer Leverkusen	Augsburg
15:30 CEST (UTC+2)	Niederlechner 30'	Report	Iago 3' (o.g.); Niederlechner 14' (o.g.); Demirbay (yellow card) 66'; Schick 75'; Wirtz 81'	Stadium: WWK Arena; Attendance: 10,582; Referee: Benjamin Brand

11 September 2021 4	Bayer Leverkusen	3–4	Borussia Dortmund	Leverkusen
15:30 CEST (UTC+2)	Wirtz 9', (yellow card) 60'; Schick 45+1'; Diaby 55', (yellow card) 86'; Frimpong (yellow card) 70'; Kossounou (yellow card) 75'	Report	Meunier (yellow card) 20'; Haaland 37', 77' (pen.), (yellow card) 60'; Brandt 49'; Guerreiro 71'; Wolf (yellow card) 90+2'	Stadium: BayArena; Attendance: 17,605; Referee: Daniel Siebert

19 September 2021 5	VfB Stuttgart	1–3	Bayer Leverkusen	Stuttgart
15:30 CEST (UTC+2)	Mangala 38'; Karazor (yellow card) 63'; Coulibaly (yellow card) 76'	Report	Andrich 2', (red card) 32'; Schick 19'; Frimpong (yellow card) 36'; Bakker (yellow card) 37'; Aránguiz (yellow card) 58'; Wirtz 70'	Stadium: Mercedes-Benz Arena; Attendance: 23,450; Referee: Benjamin Cortus

25 September 2021 6	Bayer Leverkusen	1–0	Mainz 05	Leverkusen
15:30 CEST (UTC+2)	Tah (yellow card) 11'; Diaby (yellow card) 44'; Wirtz 62'; Bakker (yellow card) 83'; Alario (yellow card) 90+3'	Report	Lucoqui (yellow card) 44'; Stach (yellow card) 69'; Lee (yellow card) 86'	Stadium: BayArena; Attendance: 16,624; Referee: Bastian Dankert

3 October 2021 7	Arminia Bielefeld	0–4	Bayer Leverkusen	Bielefeld
19:30 CEST (UTC+2)	Brunner (yellow card) 10'; Wimmer (yellow card) 55'; Czyborra (yellow card) 66'; Ortega (yellow card) 90+2'	Report	Hincapié (yellow card) 7'; Diaby 18'; Schick 24', 57'; Demirbay 90+1' (pen.)	Stadium: Bielefelder Alm; Attendance: 16,250; Referee: Felix Zwayer

17 October 2021 8	Bayer Leverkusen	1–5	Bayern Munich	Leverkusen
15:30 CEST (UTC+2)	Schick 55'	Report	Lewandowski 4', 30'; Müller 34'; Gnabry 35', 37'	Stadium: BayArena; Attendance: 29,542; Referee: Sven Jablonski

24 October 2021 9	1. FC Köln	2–2	Bayer Leverkusen	Cologne
15:30 CEST (UTC+2)	Uth (yellow card) 36'; Modeste 63', 82'	Report	Schick 15'; Bellarabi 17'; Demirbay (yellow card) 43'; Diaby (yellow card) 65'; Andrich (yellow card) 89'	Stadium: RheinEnergieStadion; Attendance: 49,600; Referee: Felix Zwayer

30 October 2021 10	Bayer Leverkusen	0–2	VfL Wolfsburg	Leverkusen
15:30 CEST (UTC+2)	Tah (yellow card) 28'; Alario (yellow card) 30', (penalty missed) 90+6'; Wirtz (yellow card) 54'	Report	Steffen (yellow card) 28'; Brooks (yellow card) 28'; Nmecha 48'; Arnold 51'; Lacroix (red card) 90+5'	Stadium: BayArena; Attendance: 20,132; Referee: Deniz Aytekin

7 November 2021 11	Hertha BSC	1–1	Bayer Leverkusen	Berlin
15:30 CET (UTC+1)	Jovetić 42'; Darida (yellow card) 64'	Report	Palacios (yellow card) 30'; Demirbay (yellow card) 58'; Diaby (yellow card) 79'; Andrich 90'	Stadium: Olympiastadion; Attendance: 22,187; Referee: Robert Hartmann

20 November 2021 12	Bayer Leverkusen	1–0	VfL Bochum	Leverkusen
15:30 CET (UTC+1)	Adli 4', (yellow card) 87'; Frimpong (yellow card) 30'; Diaby (yellow card) 49'	Report	Mašović (yellow card) 63'; Soares (yellow card) 90+1'	Stadium: BayArena; Attendance: 22,538; Referee: Daniel Schlager

28 November 2021 13	RB Leipzig	1–3	Bayer Leverkusen	Leipzig
17:30 CET (UTC+1)	Forsberg (yellow card) 38'; Silva 62'; Szoboszlai (penalty missed) 88'	Report	Andrich (yellow card) 14'; Wirtz 21'; Diaby 34'; Frimpong 64', (yellow card) 90+3'; Hradecky (yellow card) 82'	Stadium: Red Bull Arena; Attendance: 0 Referee: Benjamin Cortus

4 December 2021 14	Bayer Leverkusen	7–1	Greuther Fürth	Leverkusen
15:30 CET (UTC+1)	Adli 12'; Tapsoba 17'; Hincapié 45'; Schick 49', 69', 74', 76'	Report	Dudziak 33'; Leweling (yellow card) 38'	Stadium: BayArena; Attendance: 10,455; Referee: Tobias Reichel

12 December 2021 15	Eintracht Frankfurt	5–2	Bayer Leverkusen	Frankfurt
17:30 CET (UTC+1)	Tuta 23'; Lindstrøm 30'; Ndicka 50'; Jakić 66'; Sow 76'	Report	Schick 5', 22' (pen.); Frimpong (yellow card) 48'; Aránguiz (yellow card) 55'; Hincapié (yellow card) 61'	Stadium: Deutsche Bank Park; Attendance: 12,000; Referee: Marco Fritz

15 December 2021 16	Bayer Leverkusen	2–2	1899 Hoffenheim	Leverkusen
20:30 CET (UTC+1)	Diaby (yellow card) 21' (yellow-red card) 90+2'; Schick 37', 63'; Kossounou (yellow card) 60'; Tapsoba (yellow card) 85'; Hincapié (yellow card) 86'	Report	Rudy (yellow card) 21'; Raum (yellow card) 28'; Stiller 80'; Dabbur 83', (yellow card) 88'	Stadium: BayArena; Attendance: 13,272; Referee: Tobias Stieler

19 December 2021 17	SC Freiburg	2–1	Bayer Leverkusen	Freiburg
15:30 CET (UTC+1)	N. Schlotterbeck (yellow card) 30'; Grifo 33' (pen.); Schade 84'; Höler (yellow card) 86'	Report	Frimpong (yellow card) 32'; Andrich (yellow card) 39'; Aránguiz 45+1'; Kossounou (yellow card) 82'	Stadium: Europa-Park Stadion; Attendance: 750; Referee: Benjamin Cortus

8 January 2022 18	Bayer Leverkusen	2–2	Union Berlin	Leverkusen
15:30 CET (UTC+1)	Schick 38'; Tah (yellow card) 59', (goal) 84'	Report	Trimmel (yellow card) 31'; Prömel 45', 50'; Friedrich (yellow card) 85'	Stadium: BayArena; Attendance: 0 Referee: Matthias Jöllenbeck

15 January 2022 19	Borussia Mönchengladbach	1–2	Bayer Leverkusen	Mönchengladbach
18:30 CET (UTC+1)	Stindl (yellow card) 45+1'; Elvedi 81'; Beyer (yellow card) 84'	Report	Tah (yellow card) 28'; Bakker (yellow card) 36'; Schick (penalty missed) 50', 74'; Andrich 51'; Demirbay (penalty missed) 88', (yellow card) 90+4'	Stadium: Borussia-Park; Attendance: 750; Referee: Sascha Stegemann

22 January 2022 20	Bayer Leverkusen	5–1	FC Augsburg	Leverkusen
15:30 CET (UTC+1)	Bellarabi (yellow card) 6', (goal) 9'; Diaby 24', 65', 69'; Alario 81'	Report	Valentin (yellow card) 43'; Uduokhai (yellow card) 52'; Maier 62'	Stadium: BayArena; Attendance: 750; Referee: Daniel Schlager

6 February 2022 21	Borussia Dortmund	2–5	Bayer Leverkusen	Dortmund
15:30 CET (UTC+1)	Frimpong 16' (o.g.); Dahoud (yellow card) 26'; Tigges 89'	Report	Akanji 11' (o.g.); Wirtz 20'; Andrich 28'; Bellarabi (yellow card) 46'; Tah 53'; Diaby 87'	Stadium: Signal Iduna Park; Attendance: 10,000; Referee: Daniel Siebert

12 February 2022 22	Bayer Leverkusen	4–2	VfB Stuttgart	Leverkusen
18:30 CET (UTC+1)	Diaby 41'; Demirbay (yellow card) 45'; Adli 52'; Andrich (yellow card) 63'; Bakker (yellow card) 83'; Wirtz 86'; Schick 90'	Report	Tomás 49', 88'; Endo (yellow card) 51'; Mavropanos (yellow card) 90+4'	Stadium: BayArena; Attendance: 10,000; Referee: Felix Brych

18 February 2022 23	Mainz 05	3–2	Bayer Leverkusen	Mainz
20:30 CET (UTC+1)	Martín 57', (yellow card) 66'; Boëtius 84'; Ingvartsen 88', (yellow card) 90+5'	Report	Adli (yellow card) 31'; Schick 35'; Demirbay (yellow card) 56'; Alario 74'	Stadium: Opel Arena; Attendance: 10,000; Referee: Benjamin Cortus

26 February 2022 24	Bayer Leverkusen	3–0	Arminia Bielefeld	Leverkusen
15:30 CET (UTC+1)	Alario 30'; Diaby 57', 81'	Report	Kunze (yellow card) 60'	Stadium: BayArena; Attendance: 10,000; Referee: Martin Petersen

5 March 2022 25	Bayern Munich	1–1	Bayer Leverkusen	Munich
15:30 CET (UTC+1)	Süle 18'; Coman (yellow card) 72'	Report	Bakker (yellow card) 32'; Müller 36' (o.g.); Demirbay (yellow card) 54'	Stadium: Allianz Arena; Attendance: 25,000; Referee: Daniel Siebert

13 March 2022 26	Bayer Leverkusen	0–1	1. FC Köln	Leverkusen
15:30 CET (UTC+1)	Palacios (yellow card) 45+1'; Demirbay (yellow card) 90+2'	Report	Skhiri (yellow card) 52'; Schmitz (yellow card) 65'; Schindler 67'	Stadium: BayArena; Attendance: 22,658; Referee: Sascha Stegemann

20 March 2022 27	VfL Wolfsburg	0–2	Bayer Leverkusen	Wolfsburg
17:30 CET (UTC+1)	Lacroix (yellow card) 83'; Vranckx (yellow card) 83'	Report	Adli (yellow card) 9'; Demirbay (yellow card) 83'; Hincapié (yellow card) 83'; Paulinho 86', 90+2'	Stadium: Volkswagen Arena; Attendance: 16,554; Referee: Felix Brych

2 April 2022 28	Bayer Leverkusen	2–1	Hertha BSC	Leverkusen
15:30 CEST (UTC+2)	Alario 35'; Bellarabi 40'	Report	Boateng (yellow card) 41'; Darida 42'	Stadium: BayArena; Attendance: 23,557; Referee: Matthias Jöllenbeck

10 April 2022 29	VfL Bochum	0–0	Bayer Leverkusen	Bochum
15:30 CEST (UTC+2)		Report	Diaby (penalty missed) 65'	Stadium: Vonovia Ruhrstadion; Attendance: 25,000; Referee: Felix Zwayer

17 April 2022 30	Bayer Leverkusen	0–1	RB Leipzig	Leverkusen
19:30 CEST (UTC+2)	Hincapié (yellow card) 48'; Andrich (yellow card) 72'	Report	Gvardiol (yellow card) 36'; Szoboszlai 69'	Stadium: BayArena; Attendance: 26,119; Referee: Daniel Siebert

23 April 2022 31	Greuther Fürth	1–4	Bayer Leverkusen	Fürth
15:30 CEST (UTC+2)	Willems 5'	Report	Schick 8'; Azmoun 18'; Paulinho 58'; Palacios 84'	Stadium: Sportpark Ronhof; Attendance: 11,579; Referee: Tobias Reichel

2 May 2022 32	Bayer Leverkusen	2–0	Eintracht Frankfurt	Leverkusen
20:30 CEST (UTC+2)	Paulinho 18'; Schick 51'	Report		Stadium: BayArena; Attendance: 26,492; Referee: Benjamin Cortus

7 May 2022 33	1899 Hoffenheim	2–4	Bayer Leverkusen	Sinsheim
15:30 CEST (UTC+2)	Rutter 22'; Baumgartner 36'; Dabbur (yellow card) 66'	Report	Schick 34', 76'; Diaby 73'; Alario 90+1'	Stadium: Rhein-Neckar-Arena; Attendance: 20,033; Referee: Frank Willenborg

14 May 2022 34	Bayer Leverkusen	2–1	SC Freiburg	Leverkusen
15:30 CEST (UTC+2)	Diaby (yellow card) 18'; Baumgartlinger (yellow card) 26'; Alario 54'; Palacios 90+7'	Report	Eggestein (yellow card) 3'; N. Schlotterbeck (yellow card) 43'; Sildillia (yellow card) 77'; Haberer 88'	Stadium: BayArena; Attendance: 30,210; Referee: Sven Jablonski

=== DFB-Pokal ===
7 August 2021 First round	Lokomotive Leipzig	0–3	Bayer Leverkusen	Leipzig
15:30 CEST (UTC+2)	Pfeffer (yellow card) 9'; Rangelov (yellow card) 56'	Report	Demirbay 5' (pen.), 87'; Bellarabi 14'	Stadium: Bruno-Plache-Stadion; Attendance: 6,185; Referee: Florian Lechner

27 October 2021 Second round	Bayer Leverkusen	1–2	Karlsruher SC	Leverkusen
18:30 CEST (UTC+2)	Frimpong (yellow card) 42', (goal) 54'; Tah (yellow card) 89'	Report	Cueto 5'; Choi 63'; Gordon (yellow card) 71'	Stadium: BayArena; Attendance: 13,060; Referee: Tobias Welz

=== UEFA Europa League ===
==== Group stage ====
The draw for the group stage was held on 27 August 2021.

Pos	Team	Pld	W	D	L	GF	GA	GD	Pts	Qualification	LEV	BET	CEL	FER
1	(Germany) Bayer Leverkusen	6	4	1	1	14	5	+9	13	Advance to round of 16	—	4–0	3–2	2–1
2	(Spain) Real Betis	6	3	1	2	12	12	0	10	Advance to knockout round play-offs	1–1	—	4–3	2–0
3	(Scotland) Celtic	6	3	0	3	13	15	−2	9	Transfer to Europa Conference League	0–4	3–2	—	2–0
4	(Hungary) Ferencváros	6	1	0	5	5	12	−7	3		1–0	1–3	2–3	—

Source: UEFA
Rules for classification: Group stage tiebreakers

16 September 2021 1	Bayer Leverkusen (Germany)	2–1	(Hungary) Ferencváros	Leverkusen, Germany
18:45 CEST (UTC+2)	Demirbay (yellow card) 10'; Palacios 37'; Wirtz 69'	Report	Mmaee 8'	Stadium: BayArena; Attendance: 11,013; Referee: Andris Treimanis (Latvia)

30 September 2021 2	Celtic (Scotland)	0–4	(Germany) Bayer Leverkusen	Glasgow, Scotland
21:00 BST (UTC+1)	Rogic (yellow card) 50'; Carter-Vickers (yellow card) 57'	Report	Hincapié 25'; Wirtz 35'; Bakker (yellow card) 41'; Alario 58' (pen.); Adli 90+4'	Stadium: Celtic Park; Attendance: 55,436; Referee: Marco Di Bello (Italy)

21 October 2021 3	Real Betis (Spain)	1–1	(Germany) Bayer Leverkusen	Seville, Spain
18:45 CEST (UTC+2)	Miranda (yellow card) 10'; Pezzella (yellow card) 71'; Iglesias 75' (pen.)	Report	Alario (yellow card) 50'; Tapsoba (yellow card) 62'; Hincapié (yellow card) 71'; Andrich 82'; Diaby (yellow card) 86'	Stadium: Benito Villamarín; Attendance: 39,230; Referee: Bartosz Frankowski (Poland)

4 November 2021 4	Bayer Leverkusen (Germany)	4–0	(Spain) Real Betis	Leverkusen, Germany
21:00 CET (UTC+1)	Adli (yellow card) 10'; Diaby 42', 52'; Andrich (yellow card) 44'; Wirtz 86'; Amiri 90'; Demirbay (red card) 90+3'	Report	Fekir (red card) 90+3'	Stadium: BayArena; Attendance: 15,208; Referee: Anthony Taylor (England)

25 November 2021 5	Bayer Leverkusen (Germany)	3–2	(Scotland) Celtic	Leverkusen, Germany
21:00 CET (UTC+1)	Andrich 16', 82'; Palacios (yellow card) 33'; Hradecky (yellow card) 39'; Diaby 87'	Report	Juranović 40' (pen.); Jota 56'; Carter-Vickers (yellow card) 69'	Stadium: BayArena; Attendance: 19,830; Referee: Anastasios Sidiropoulos (Greece)

10 December 2021 6	Ferencváros (Hungary)	1–0	(Germany) Bayer Leverkusen	Budapest, Hungary
21:00 CET (UTC+1)	Laïdouni 82', (yellow card) 84'; Blažič (yellow card) 90'; Čabraja (yellow card) 90+2'	Report	Bellarabi (yellow card) 25'; Retsos (yellow card) 86'; Kossounou (yellow card) 87'	Stadium: Ferencváros Stadion; Attendance: 12,127; Referee: Kirill Levnikov (Russia)

==== Knockout phase ====
===== Round of 16 =====
The draw for the round of 16 was held on 25 February 2022.

10 March 2022 First leg	Atalanta (Italy)	3–2	(Germany) Bayer Leverkusen	Bergamo, Italy
21:00 CET (UTC+1)	Malinovskyi 23'; Muriel 25', 49'; Tolói (yellow card) 64'	Report	Aránguiz 11'; Diaby 63'; Bakker (yellow card) 73'; Wirtz (yellow card) 78'	Stadium: Stadio Atleti Azzurri d'Italia; Attendance: 13,134; Referee: Srđan Jovanović (Serbia)

17 March 2022 Second leg	Bayer Leverkusen (Germany)	0–1 (2–4 agg.)	(Italy) Atalanta	Leverkusen, Germany
18:45 CET (UTC+1)	Fosu-Mensah (yellow card) 56'; Diaby (yellow card) 90'; Andrich (yellow card) 90'	Report	Boga 90+1'	Stadium: BayArena; Attendance: 19,871; Referee: François Letexier (France)

== Statistics ==
=== Appearances and goals ===
No.	Pos	Nat	Player	Total		Bundesliga		DFB-Pokal		Europa League	
No.	Pos	Nat	Player	Apps	Goals	Apps	Goals	Apps	Goals	Apps	Goals
Goalkeepers
1	GK	(Finland) FIN	Lukas Hradecky	41	0	32	0	2	0	7	0
21	GK	(Germany) GER	Lennart Grill	1	0	1	0	0	0	0	0
36	GK	(Germany) GER	Niklas Lomb	0	0	0	0	0	0	0	0
40	GK	(Russia) RUS	Andrey Lunyov	2	0	1	0	0	0	1	0
Defenders
4	DF	(Germany) GER	Jonathan Tah	42	2	33	2	1	0	7+1	0
5	DF	(Netherlands) NED	Mitchel Bakker	30	0	19+6	0	1	0	3+1	0
6	DF	(Ivory Coast) CIV	Odilon Kossounou	33	0	19+8	0	1	0	3+2	0
12	DF	(Burkina Faso) BFA	Edmond Tapsoba	29	1	19+3	1	1	0	5+1	0
22	DF	(Netherlands) NED	Daley Sinkgraven	18	0	3+9	0	1+1	0	2+2	0
24	DF	(Netherlands) NED	Timothy Fosu-Mensah	8	0	0+6	0	0	0	1+1	0
30	DF	(Netherlands) NED	Jeremie Frimpong	34	2	25	1	2	1	6+1	0
33	DF	(Ecuador) ECU	Piero Hincapié	33	2	20+7	1	0	0	5+1	1
Midfielders
8	MF	(Germany) GER	Robert Andrich	32	7	21+5	4	1	0	3+2	3
10	MF	(Germany) GER	Kerem Demirbay	36	3	23+6	1	1+1	2	5	0
15	MF	(Austria) AUT	Julian Baumgartlinger	7	0	1+5	0	0+1	0	0	0
20	MF	(Chile) CHI	Charles Aránguiz	32	2	16+10	1	1	0	4+1	1
25	MF	(Argentina) ARG	Exequiel Palacios	32	3	12+11	2	1+1	0	5+2	1
27	MF	(Germany) GER	Florian Wirtz	31	10	22+2	7	0+1	0	5+1	3
29	MF	(Denmark) DEN	Zidan Sertdemir	3	0	0+3	0	0	0	0	0
38	MF	(Germany) GER	Karim Bellarabi	22	4	9+7	3	1	1	2+3	0
Forwards
7	FW	(Brazil) BRA	Paulinho	31	4	14+10	4	1	0	4+2	0
9	FW	(Iran) IRI	Sardar Azmoun	11	1	4+5	1	0	0	0+2	0
13	FW	(Argentina) ARG	Lucas Alario	33	7	5+22	6	0	0	5+1	1
14	FW	(Czech Republic) CZE	Patrik Schick	31	24	26+1	24	1	0	0+3	0
19	FW	(France) FRA	Moussa Diaby	42	17	32	13	2	0	7+1	4
28	FW	(Spain) ESP	Iker Bravo	2	0	0+1	0	0+1	0	0	0
31	FW	(France) FRA	Amine Adli	34	4	13+12	3	1	0	6+2	1
Players transferred out during the season
3	DF	(Greece) GRE	Panagiotis Retsos	8	0	0+4	0	1	0	1+2	0
11	MF	(Germany) GER	Nadiem Amiri	20	2	3+10	1	2	0	2+3	1
17	FW	(Finland) FIN	Joel Pohjanpalo	3	0	0+2	0	0+1	0	0	0
18	DF	(Brazil) BRA	Wendell	1	0	0	0	0+1	0	0	0
23	DF	(Germany) GER	Mitchell Weiser	1	0	0	0	0+1	0	0	0
32	MF	(Morocco) MAR	Ayman Azhil	0	0	0	0	0	0	0	0
37	FW	(Germany) GER	Emrehan Gedikli	0	0	0	0	0	0	0	0

Last updated: 14 May 2022
Source: Competitions

=== Goalscorers ===
Rank	Pos	No.	Nat.	Player	Bundesliga	DFB-Pokal	UEFA EL	Total
1	FW	17	(Czech Republic)	Patrik Schick	24	0	0	24
2	FW	19	(France)	Moussa Diaby	13	0	4	17
3	MF	27	(Germany)	Florian Wirtz	7	0	3	10
4	MF	8	(Germany)	Robert Andrich	4	0	3	7
4	FW	13	(Argentina)	Lucas Alario	6	0	1	7
6	FW	7	(Brazil)	Paulinho	4	0	0	4
6	FW	31	(France)	Amine Adli	3	0	1	4
6	MF	38	(Germany)	Karim Bellarabi	3	1	0	4
9	MF	10	(Germany)	Kerem Demirbay	1	2	0	3
9	MF	25	(Argentina)	Exequiel Palacios	2	0	1	3
11	DF	4	(Germany)	Jonathan Tah	2	0	0	2
11	MF	11	(Germany)	Nadiem Amiri	1	0	1	2
11	MF	20	(Chile)	Charles Aránguiz	1	0	1	2
11	DF	30	(Netherlands)	Jeremie Frimpong	1	1	0	2
11	DF	33	(Ecuador)	Piero Hincapié	1	0	1	2
16	FW	9	(Iran)	Sardar Azmoun	1	0	0	1
16	DF	12	(Burkina Faso)	Edmond Tapsoba	1	0	0	1
Own goals					5	0	0	5
Totals					80	4	16	100

Last updated: 14 May 2022
