= Zidan Sertdemir =

Danish footballer (born 2005)

Personal information
- Full name: Batuhan Zidan Sertdemir
- Date of birth: 4 February 2005 (age 21)
- Place of birth: Ishøj, Denmark
- Height: 1.82 m (6 ft 0 in)
- Position: Midfielder

Team information
- Current team: Lyngby

Youth career
- 2012–2017: Brøndby
- 2017–2021: Nordsjælland

Senior career*
Years	Team	Apps	(Gls)
2021–2023	Bayer Leverkusen	3	(0)
2023–2025	Nordsjælland	47	(1)
2025–2026	Preußen Münster	20	(1)
2026–	Lyngby	0	(0)

International career
2020–2021	Denmark U16	4	(1)
2021	Denmark U17	5	(5)
2021–2024	Denmark U19	16	(3)
2024	Denmark U20	1	(0)
- * Club domestic league appearances and goals as of 3 September 2026

Batuhan Zidan Sertdemir (born 4 February 2005) is a Danish professional footballer who plays as a midfielder for Lyngby.

== Club career ==
Sertdemir is a youth product of Brøndby and moved to the academy of Nordsjælland at the age of 12. He then joined German club Bayer Leverkusen on 15 June 2021, signing a three-year contract.

He made his senior debut with Bayer Leverkusen in a 1–1 Bundesliga tie with Hertha on 7 November 2021. At 16 years and 276 days, Sertdemir is the youngest ever debutant for Bayer Leverkusen in the Bundesliga overtaking his teammate Iker Bravo in the same match, and the second-youngest debutant in the league after Youssoufa Moukoko.

Having not managed to break through Bayer's first team on a full basis, on 31 January 2023 Sertdemir officially returned to Nordsjælland, joining the club on a permanent deal.

On 31 August 2025, Sertdemir returned to Germany, signing with 2. Bundesliga club Preußen Münster.

On 1 September 2026, Sertdemir joined Danish Superliga side Lyngby Boldklub on a four-year contract.

== International career ==
Born in Ishøj, Denmark, Sertdemir is of Kurdish and Turkish descent. He is a youth international for Denmark, having represented the Denmark U16s and U17s.

== Career statistics ==
=== Club ===
As of match played 1 July 2026

Appearances and goals by club, season and competition
Club	Season	League			National cup		Europe		Total	
Club	Season	Division	Apps	Goals	Apps	Goals	Apps	Goals	Apps	Goals
Bayer Leverkusen	2021–22	Bundesliga	3	0	0	0	0	0	3	0
Bayer Leverkusen	2022–23	Bundesliga	0	0	0	0	0	0	0	0
FC Nordsjælland	2023–24	Danish Superliga	13	0	3	0	5 (Note: Appearances in UEFA Conference League)	0	21	0
FC Nordsjælland	2024–25	Danish Superliga	31	0	2	0	—		33	0
FC Nordsjælland	2025–26	Danish Superliga	3	1	0	0	—		3	1
FC Nordsjælland	Total		47	1	5	0	5	0	57	1
Preußen Münster	2025–26	2. Bundesliga	20	1	0	0	—		20	1
Career total			70	2	5	0	5	0	80	2
