= Karneval der Kulturen =

Multicultural festival in Kreuzberg, Berlin

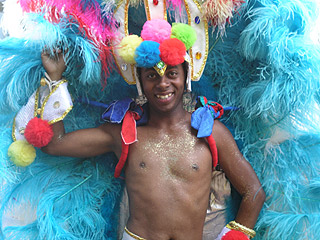
Karneval der Kulturen in Berlin

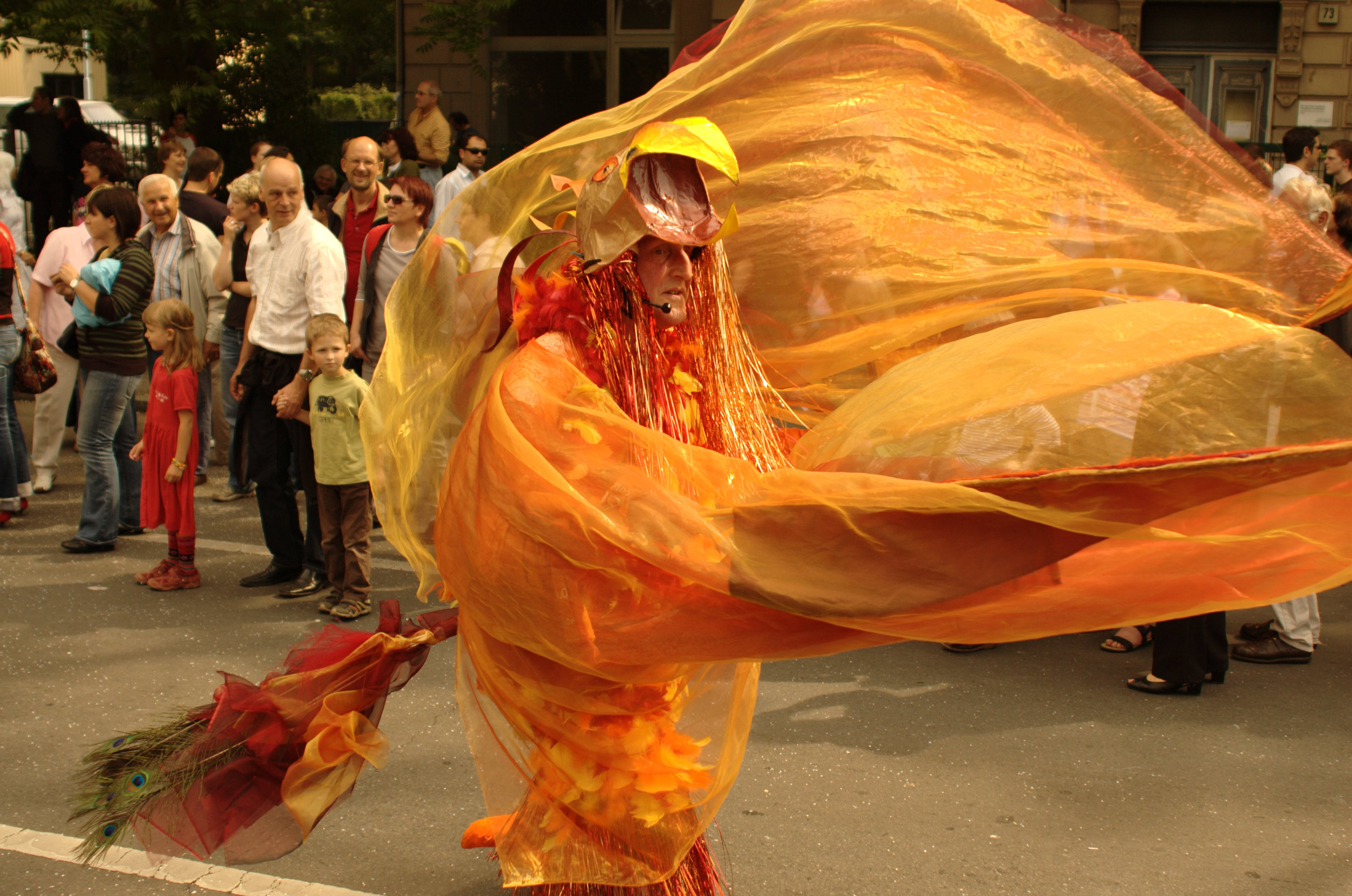
2009

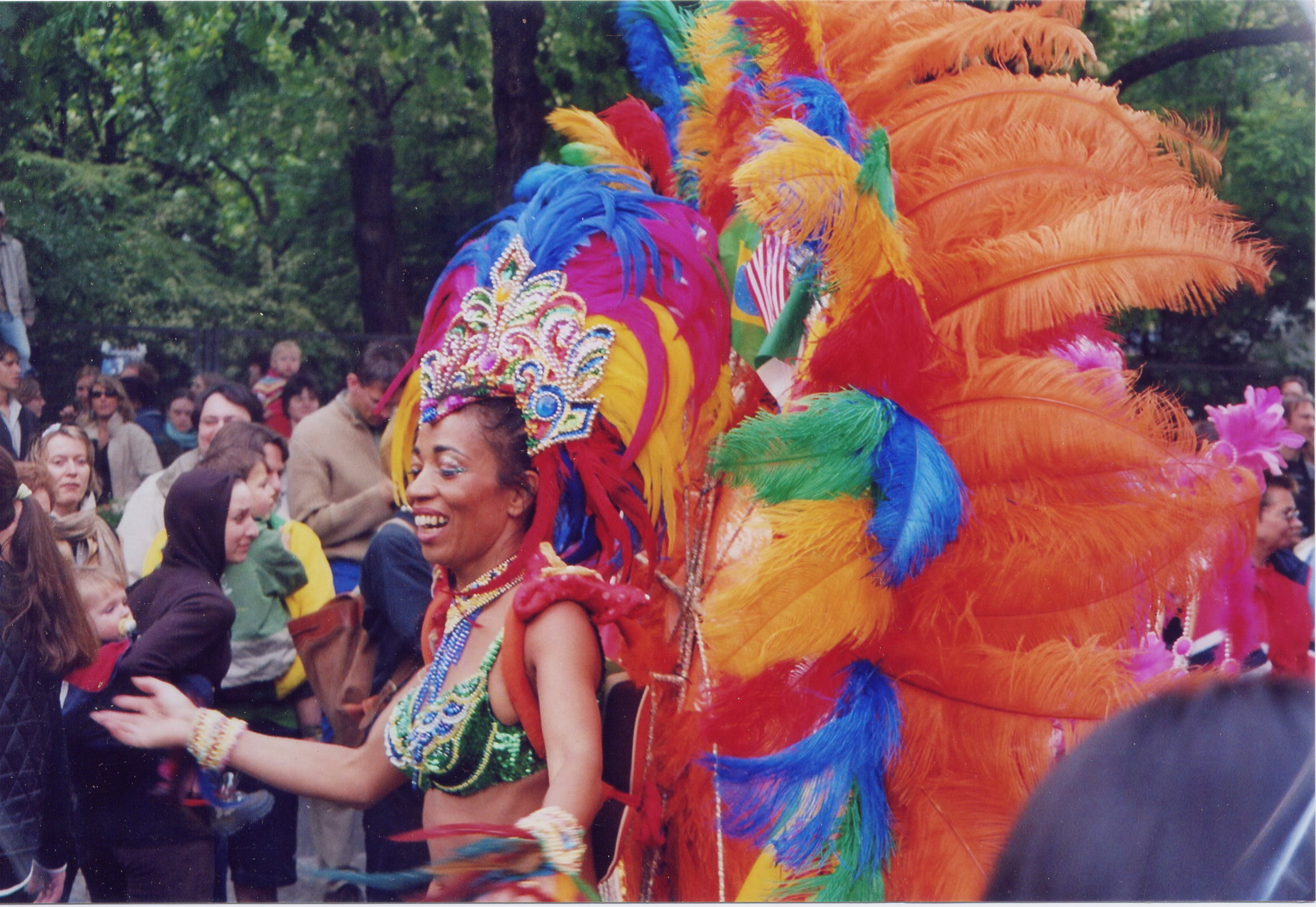
2006

Karneval der Kulturen (Carnival of Cultures) is a multicultural festival in Kreuzberg, Berlin, celebrated annually since 1996 around Pentecost weekend. It is organised by the Werkstatt der Kulturen. The processions, theatre performances, and music events celebrate peace, tolerance, and multiculturalism.

== History ==
The Werkstatt der Kulturen was founded in October 1993 in Neukölln, Berlin, patronised by the Berlin Senate. The first Karneval der Kulturen took place on 15 and 16 May 1996 around Ascension Thursday. It was inspired by other European carnivals such as the Notting Hill Carnival in London and the Zomercarnaval in Rotterdam.

The Karneval der Kulturen then grew to a four-day festival with numerous musical and theatrical performances. The number of visitors grew from 50,000 in 1996 to 300,000 in 1997, 1 million in 2000, to more than one million in 2018. The number of participants also grew from 2,200 to more than 4,000, organised into 66 procession groups (2018). These procession groups come from all over Germany, but also include South American and African groups.

The 2020 edition of Karneval der Kulturen, originally scheduled for the weekend of 31 May, was canceled due to the ongoing COVID-19 pandemic.
