= Angolans in the Netherlands =

Ethnic group

Angolans in the Netherlands Angolezen in Nederland Angolanos nos Países Baixos
Total population
- 9,363 (2022)

Regions with significant populations
- Eindhoven, Gilze en Rijen, Nunspeet, Rotterdam, Amsterdam

Languages
- Portuguese

Religion
- Roman Catholicism, minority Pentecostalism

There is a small population of Angolans in the Netherlands (Dutch: Angolezen in Nederland; Portuguese: Angolanos nos Países Baixos) numbering around 10,000 people, largely consisting of refugees from the Angolan Civil War.

== Migration history ==
The Netherlands has no longstanding historical links with Angola. Early Angolan migrants in Europe typically settled in Portugal, the former colonial power in their home country. However, they found it difficult to obtain work there, and also suffered from discrimination. Some thus travelled to other countries, including the Netherlands.

The major draw for Angolan migration to the Netherlands was the relatively generous asylum policy. In the first half of 2001 alone, 1,800 Angolans applied for asylum in the Netherlands, making up nearly half of the total number of Angolan asylum-seekers in the western world. In total, from 1998-2002, more than 10,000 Angolans applied for asylum in the Netherlands. As many as 4,500 of those consisted of unaccompanied minors. Thousands had their claims for asylum rejected and were thus ineligible for residence permits, but had been permitted to delay their departure due to the lack of safety in their home country. In 1999, State Secretary for Justice Job Cohen pushed to have the delay of departure scheme ended; though in his judgment the situation in Angola as a whole was still not safe, Luanda was stable enough to enable Angolans to return.

Before 2002, there was little return migration from the Netherlands to Angola; only ten such individuals were known to the International Organization for Migration. However, in 2003, the number of returnees began to increase sharply. Under the Return and Emigration of Aliens from the Netherlands programme, rejected asylum seekers are eligible for a variety of support including an airline ticket to the airport nearest their return destination, reimbursement of fees paid to acquire travel documents, and a resettlement payment to assist with the initial period after relocation. Unaccompanied minors returning to Angola voluntarily also receive assistance in locating their family, and may also be provided with free temporary accommodation at a reception centre if their family cannot be located or cannot receive them.

There is also some illegal immigration from Angola to the Netherlands. Irregular migrants do not typically make use of people smugglers to enter the Netherlands; they instead get help from their social networks. Such practises have prevented the emergence of large-scale smuggling organisations in Angola.

As of today, Angolans are part of the wider Portuguese-speaking community in the Netherlands, comprising around 35,000 people from PALOP countries (the overwhelming majority being from Angola or from Cape Verde), Timor-Leste or Macau, 65,000 Brazilians and 35,600 Portuguese.

== Demographic characteristics ==
As of 2022, statistics of the Dutch Centraal Bureau voor de Statistiek with regards to people of Angolan origin showed:

- 4,995 persons of first-generation background
- 4,368 persons of second-generation background, of which:
  - 1,868 persons with one parent born in the Netherlands
  - 2,500 persons with both parents born outside the Netherlands

For a total of 9,363 persons. This represented roughly 3.6 times the 1996 total of 2,594 persons. Their total population peaked in 2004 at 12,281 persons and has been in decline since then.

== Organisations ==
As of 2007, Angolans had established five of their own organisations in the Netherlands, as well as three jointly with Congolese migrants. The latter are unusual in Dutch society, as the two groups share neither a common language (other than Dutch) nor a common country of origin. The organisations generally aim to bring Angolans together and promote their integration into Dutch society, empower Angolan women, provide sex education, and organise social activities and sports competitions. The organisations are generally male-dominated, with as many as 80% of the members being men.
