= Luciano van Kallen =

Dutch footballer

Luciano van Kallen (born 2 November 1977) is a Dutch footballer who played as a forward for Eerste Divisie clubs FC Eindhoven during the 2001–2003 seasons and Stormvogels Telstar during the 2003–2004 season.
