= Sergio Babb =

Dutch footballer (born 1982)

Personal information
- Date of birth: 9 August 1982 (age 44)
- Place of birth: Amsterdam, Netherlands
- Position: Forward

Youth career
- Buitenveldert
- Achilles '12

Senior career*
Years	Team	Apps	(Gls)
2003–2004	Twente	2	(0)
2004–2005	Eintracht Nordhorn	9	(0)
2005–2008	HSC '21		
2010–2016	DETO		
2016–2017	Quick '20	29	(0)
2017	Achilles '12		
- * Club domestic league appearances and goals

Sergio Babb (born 9 August 1982) is a Dutch former professional footballer who played as a striker.

== Club career ==
Babb played on the professional level for club FC Twente of the Dutch Eredivisie league during the 2003-2004 season and later played for German Oberliga club Eintracht Nordhorn, Dutch amateur sides HSC '21 and DETO before joining Quick '20 in summer 2016. Babb moved to Achilles '12 in July 2017, but left again one month later after suffering both an ankle and a knee injury. He immediately retired from club football.
