= Cape Verdeans in the Netherlands =

People from Cape Verde in the Netherlands

Cape Verdeans in the Netherlands Kaapverdianen in Nederland Cabo-verdianos nos Países Baixos
Total population
- 23,150 (2022)

Regions with significant populations
- Rotterdam

Languages
- Cape Verdean Creole, Dutch, Portuguese

Religion
- Catholicism, minority Jehovah's Witnesses

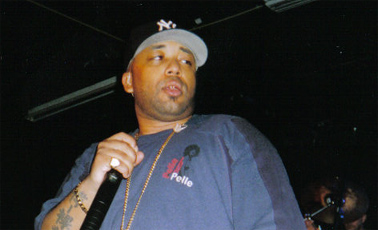
E-Life, a rapper from the Netherlands of Cape Verdean origin

Cape Verdeans in the Netherlands (Dutch: Kaapverdianen in Nederland; Portuguese: Cabo-verdianos nos Países Baixos) consist of migrants from Cape Verde to the Netherlands and their descendants. As of 2022, figures from Statistics Netherlands showed 23,150 people of Cape Verdean origin in the Netherlands (people from Cape Verde, or those with a parent from there).

== Migration history ==
Early migration from Cape Verde to the Netherlands began in the 1960s and 1970s. The migrants consisted primarily of young men who had signed on as sailors on Dutch ships, and as such they concentrated primarily in the port city of Rotterdam, especially the Heemraadsplein area. Prior to independence in 1975, Cape Verdean immigrants were registered as Portuguese immigrants from the overseas province of Portuguese Cape Verde. Another wave of migration began in 1975, following the independence of Cape Verde from Portugal; this new wave of migrants comprised primarily teachers, soldiers, and other lower officials of the former government. There was an immigration amnesty for Cape Verdean migrants in 1976.

From 1996 to 2010, the number of Cape Verdeans in the Netherlands recorded by Statistics Netherlands grew by roughly 25% from a base of 16,662 people; about three-quarters of the growth in that period was in the 2nd-generation category (people born in the Netherlands to one or two migrant parents from Cape Verde).

As of today, Cape Verdeans are part of the wider Portuguese-speaking community in the Netherlands, comprising around 35,000 people from PALOP countries (the overwhelming majority being from Angola or from Cape Verde), Timor-Leste or Macau, 65,000 Brazilians and 35,600 Portuguese.

== Distribution ==
Approximately 90% live in the Rotterdam metropolitan area. In Rotterdam, the largest concentration live in Delfshaven, where they make up about 8.8% of the borough's population. The city has more than 60 Cape Verdean civil organisations. Smaller groups can be found in other cities such as Schiedam, Amsterdam, Zaanstad, and Delfzijl.

== Employment and business ==
Cape Verdeans generally have better labour market outcomes than other migrant groups like Turks or Moroccans, similar to those of Surinamese, but worse than those of natives. The various Cape Verdean-run hair salons of Rotterdam often serve as gathering points for the women of the community. Other common ethnic business niches include transport businesses and travel agencies. The Cape Verdeans are also renown in the music industry and currently developing within the contemporary fine arts.

== Notable people ==
- Luc Castaignos, footballer
- Edson da Graça, presenter and stand-up comedian
- Alex da Silva, Artist
- Miguel Dias, boxer
- E-Life, rapper
- Eddy "Eddy Fort Moda Grog" Fortes, rapper
- Nelson Freitas, singer, writer and producer
- Alviar Lima, kickboxer
- Suzanna Lubrano, singer
- Dina Medina (1975-), singer
- Gery "GMB" Mendes, musician and actor
- David Mendes da Silva, footballer
- Sonia Pereira (1972-), psychic, medium, television presenter and actress
- Gil Semedo, singer
- Sonja Silva (1977-), presenter, actress, model and singer
- Luis Tavares, kickboxer
- Lerin Duarte
- Deroy Duarte

== See also ==
- List of Cape Verdeans
- Demographics of Cape Verde

== Sources ==
- Barajas, Diego, ed. (2003), "Archipelagos of Cape Verde in Rotterdam: Dispersed Nation", Dispersion: a study of a global mobility and the dynamics of a fictional urbanism, Episode Publishers, ISBN 978-90-5973-002-1
- Choenni, Chan (May 2004), Kaapverdianen in Nederland: een profiel/Cape Verdeans in the Netherlands: a profile (PDF), The Hague, Netherlands: Ministry of Justice
- Marc-Montclos, Antoine Pérouse de (2008), "Chapter 2: The Political Value of Remittances: Cape Verde, Comores, and Lesotho", Diasporas, Remittances and Africa South of the Sahara - A Strategic Assessment, Institute for Security Studies, archived from the original on 2008-02-29
- Population by origin and generation, 1 January, The Hague: Centraal Bureau voor de Statistiek, 2010-03-15
