= Shane Parris =

Dutch footballer (born 1990)

Shane Parris (born 10 November 1990 in Amsterdam) is a Dutch footballer who played for Eerste Divisie club FC Oss during the 2009-2010 football season.
