= Alfons Fosu-Mensah =

Dutch footballer (born 1994)

Personal information
- Full name: Alfons Fosu-Mensah
- Date of birth: 4 March 1994 (age 32)
- Place of birth: Amsterdam, Netherlands
- Position: Forward

Youth career
- Zeeburgia
- 2010–2011: AFC
- 2011–2014: Argon
- 2014: Almere City

Senior career*
Years	Team	Apps	(Gls)
2014–2015	Oss	7	(0)
2015	Southport		
2015	Colwyn Bay		
2015–2016	Ashton United		
2016	Skelmersdale United		
2016–2017	North Ferriby United	4	(0)
2017	Hednesford Town	3	(0)
2017	Marine	9	(2)
2017–2018	Airbus UK Broughton	22	(16)
2018	Llandudno	4	(1)
2018	→ Denbigh Town (loan)	4	(2)
2018–2019	Widnes	2	(0)
2019–2020	Llandudno	4	(1)
2020	Stalybridge Celtic	2	(0)
2020–2021	Glossop North End	9	(2)
- * Club domestic league appearances and goals as of 10:51, 5 November 2020 (UTC)

Alfons Fosu-Mensah (born 4 March 1994), previously known as Alfons Agbolosoo, is a Dutch footballer who plays as a forward.

== Career ==
Fosu-Mensah's youth career began with Zeeburgia, before he had spells with AFC, Argon and Almere City. After leaving Almere City, he had a trial with Eerste Divisie club Oss in 2014 which led to him signing a contract with the team, originally as an amateur before signing a professional deal soon after. He made his professional football debut on 31 January 2015 versus De Graafschap. Fosu-Mensah made six more appearances in the league for Oss before departing. Upon leaving Oss, he also left Dutch football and moved to the UK to join his brother Timothy and agreed to sign for English National League side Southport.

After only a few months with Southport, he left to join Northern Premier League Premier Division team Colwyn Bay but his spell with them lasted just months again. Further spells with Ashton United, Skelmersdale United and North Ferriby United then followed. On 1 February 2017, Fosu-Mensah joined Northern Premier League Premier Division side Hednesford Town. His debut came on 5 February in a 1–1 draw against Barwell. After three appearances for Hednesford, Fosu-Mensah departed to join fellow NPL Premier Division team Marine on 3 March. He scored twice in nine matches for Marine in England's level eight.

In August 2017, Fosu-Mensah joined Welsh Cymru Alliance club Airbus UK Broughton. He made his debut on 22 August, coming on as a substitute against Gresford Athletic. On the following Saturday, Fosu-Mensah scored a hat-trick in his first start for Airbus UK versus Holywell Town in a 2–5 win. During a run of ten goals in his first eight matches for Airbus UK, he signed a new contract with the club on 21 September. He departed on 30 May 2018, after twenty goals in thirty-one fixtures in all competitions for Airbus UK. In August 2018, Fosu-Mensah signed with Welsh Premier League side Llandudno.

Weeks after signing for Llandudno, Fosu-Mensah was loaned out to Denbigh Town of the Cymru Alliance, before returning to his parent club in September, having scored three goals in all appearances whilst at Denbigh. He was released by Llandudno in November, which preceded him signing for England's NPL Division One West club Widnes in December. On 27 July 2019, Fosu-Mensah rejoined Llandudno for a second spell, with them now in Welsh football's tier two. He netted the first goal of his second stint in September vs. Bangor City. Fosu-Mensah switched Llandudno for Stalybridge Celtic in February 2020.

In September 2020, Fosu-Mensah signed with Northern Premier League team Glossop North End. He made his debut in an FA Cup preliminary round defeat to City of Liverpool on 12 September, before scoring his first goal against Cleethorpes Town on 26 September.

== Personal life ==
Fosu-Mensah was born in the Netherlands to Ghanaian parents. He is the brother of fellow footballers Timothy and Paul.

== Career statistics ==
As of 5 November 2020.

Club statistics
Club	Season	League			Cup		League Cup		Continental		Other		Total	
Club	Season	Division	Apps	Goals	Apps	Goals	Apps	Goals	Apps	Goals	Apps	Goals	Apps	Goals
North Ferriby United	2016–17	National League	4	0	0	0	—		—		0	0	4	0
Hednesford Town	2016–17	NPL Premier Division	3	0	—		—		—		0	0	3	0
Marine	2016–17	NPL Premier Division	9	2	—		—		—		0	0	9	2
Airbus UK Broughton	2017–18	Cymru Alliance	22	16	3	0	3	2	—		3 (Note: Appearance(s) in the NEWFA Challenge Cup and Cymru Alliance League Cup)	2	31	20
Llandudno	2018–19	Premier League	4	1	0	0	0	0	—		0	0	4	1
Denbigh Town (loan)	2018–19	Cymru Alliance	4	2	0	0	1	1	—		0	0	5	3
Widnes	2018–19	NPL Division One West	2	0	—		—		—		1 (Note: Appearance(s) in the Liverpool Senior Cup)	0	3	0
Llandudno	2019–20	Cymru North	4	1	0	0	0	0	—		0	0	4	1
Stalybridge Celtic	2019–20	NPL Premier Division	2	0	0	0	0	0	—		1 (Note: Appearance(s) in the NPL League Cup)	0	3	0
Glossop North End	2020–21	NPL Division One South East	9	2	1	0	0	0	—		0	0	10	2
Career total			63	24	4	0	4	3	—		5	2	76	29
