= Jahri Valentijn =

Dutch footballer (born 1984)

Personal information
- Full name: Jahriziño Winston Valentijn
- Date of birth: December 2, 1984 (age 41)
- Place of birth: Paramaribo, Suriname
- Height: 6 ft 3 in (1.91 m)
- Position: Defender

Team information
- Current team: FC Lienden
- Number: 25

Youth career
- DWO Zoetermeer
- ADO Den Haag
- until 2005: FC Kranenburg
- 2005–2006: Haaglandia

Senior career*
Years	Team	Apps	(Gls)
2006–2008	FC Utrecht	2	(0)
2008	→ AGOVV Apeldoorn (loan)	10	(0)
2009–2011	Haaglandia	15	(1)
2011–	FC Lienden	4	(3)
- * Club domestic league appearances and goals

Jahriziño Winston Valentijn (born 2 December 1984 in Paramaribo, Suriname) is a Dutch footballer who currently plays for FC Lienden.

== Life ==
Valentijn is a defender who was born in Paramaribo and raised in Amsterdam.

=== Career ===
He made his debut in professional football, being part of the FC Utrecht squad in the 2006-07 season.
