= Paul Fosu-Mensah =

Dutch association football player

Personal information
- Date of birth: 10 April 2001 (age 25)
- Place of birth: Amsterdam, Netherlands
- Position: Right-back

Team information
- Current team: Brattvåg IL
- Number: 6

Youth career
- Zeeburgia
- 2009–2018: Ajax
- 2019–2020: Vitesse

Senior career*
Years	Team	Apps	(Gls)
2021–2022	Helmond Sport	22	(0)
2022–2023	Politehnica Iași	5	(0)
2023–	Brattvåg IL	27	(1)

International career
2016	Netherlands U15	1	(0)
- * Club domestic league appearances and goals as of 6 September 2024

Paul Fosu-Mensah (born 10 April 2001) is a Dutch professional footballer who plays as a right-back for Norwegian club Brattvåg IL.

== Club career ==
Fosu-Mensah is a former youth academy player of Zeeburgia, Ajax and Vitesse. On 28 July 2021, he joined Eerste Divisie club Helmond Sport on a one-year deal. He made his professional debut on 20 August 2021 in a 3–2 league defeat against MVV Maastricht.

On 20 July 2022, Fosu-Mensah signed a one-year contract with Romanian Liga II club Politehnica Iași.

== International career ==
Fosu-Mensah is a former Dutch youth national team player. He has played for under-15 team in a friendly match against Germany.

== Personal life ==
Born in Netherlands, Fosu-Mensah is of Ghanaian descent. He is the younger brother of fellow footballers Alfons and Timothy.

== Career statistics ==
=== Club ===
As of 20 August 2021

Appearances and goals by club, season and competition
Club	Season	League			Cup		Continental		Total	
Club	Season	Division	Apps	Goals	Apps	Goals	Apps	Goals	Apps	Goals
Helmond Sport	2021–22	Eerste Divisie	1	0	0	0	—		1	0
Career total			1	0	0	0	0	0	1	0
