= Dwight Eind =

Dutch footballer (born 1983)

Personal information
- Full name: Dwight Eind
- Date of birth: 2 December 1983 (age 42)
- Place of birth: Haarlem, Netherlands
- Position: Midfielder

Youth career
- AS '80
- Sporting Flevoland

Senior career*
Years	Team	Apps	(Gls)
2005–2007	Omniworld	47	(4)
2007–2008	Dessel Sport	27	(0)
2008–2009	Omniworld		
2009–2014	Sparta Nijkerk		
- * Club domestic league appearances and goals as of 13:25, 2 July 2017 (UTC)

Dwight Eind (born December 2, 1983, in Haarlem) is a Dutch retired footballer who played for Eerste Divisie club FC Omniworld during the 2005-2007 seasons.

== Club career ==
Eind played two seasons in the Dutch Eerste Divisie for Omniworld before joining Belgian side Dessel Sport. After returning to Holland, he played for amateur sides Sparta Nijkerk, Veensche Boys and Waterwijk and started working for the Almere municipality.
