= Melvin Kingsale =

Dutch footballer

Personal information
- Date of birth: 2 April 1997 (age 29)
- Place of birth: Groningen, Netherlands
- Position: Defender

Youth career
- –2009: SC Feyenoord
- 2009–2016: Feyenoord

Senior career*
Years	Team	Apps	(Gls)
2016–2017	FC Dordrecht	4	(0)

International career
2012	Netherlands U-15	1	(0)
- * Club domestic league appearances and goals as of 27 May 2017

Melvin Kingsale (born 2 April 1997) is a Dutch football player of Curaçao descent who last played for FC Dordrecht.

== Club career ==
He made his professional debut in the Eerste Divisie for FC Dordrecht on 3 February 2017 in a game against Fortuna Sittard.
