= Rodney Ubbergen =

Dutch footballer (born 1986)

Personal information
- Date of birth: 6 April 1986 (age 40)
- Place of birth: Amsterdam, Netherlands
- Height: 1.87 m (6 ft 2 in)
- Position: Goalkeeper

Youth career
- AFC
- Ajax
- AZ
- RKC Waalwijk

Senior career*
Years	Team	Apps	(Gls)
2005–2009	RBC Roosendaal	4	(0)
2009–2012	Telstar	9	(0)
2012–2014	SC Cambuur	0	(0)
2014–2015	FC Oss	1	(0)
2016–2019	DOVO	45+	(0)
Total		59+	(0)
- * Club domestic league appearances and goals

Rodney Ubbergen (born 6 April 1986) is a Dutch former professional footballer who played as a goalkeeper. He is of Surinamese descent.

== Career ==
Born in Amsterdam, Ubbergen has played for AFC, Ajax, AZ, RKC Waalwijk, RBC Roosendaal, Telstar, Cambuur and FC Oss.

After two seasons with Cambuur, he signed with FC Oss in August 2014 on an amateur basis. In 2016, he joined amateur club DOVO.

== Personal life ==
Ubbergen has discussed his preference for the lower pressure and greater community feel of amateur football. In an interview with Vice, he explained that he finds more personal satisfaction and happiness playing on amateur fields and in local community settings rather than within the professional circuit.

His private life has occasionally featured in the media, with Ubbergen dating model Kim Feenstra between 2014 and 2015.
