= Summer Carnival =

Annual event in Rotterdam, Netherlands

Summer Carnaval Zomercarnaval
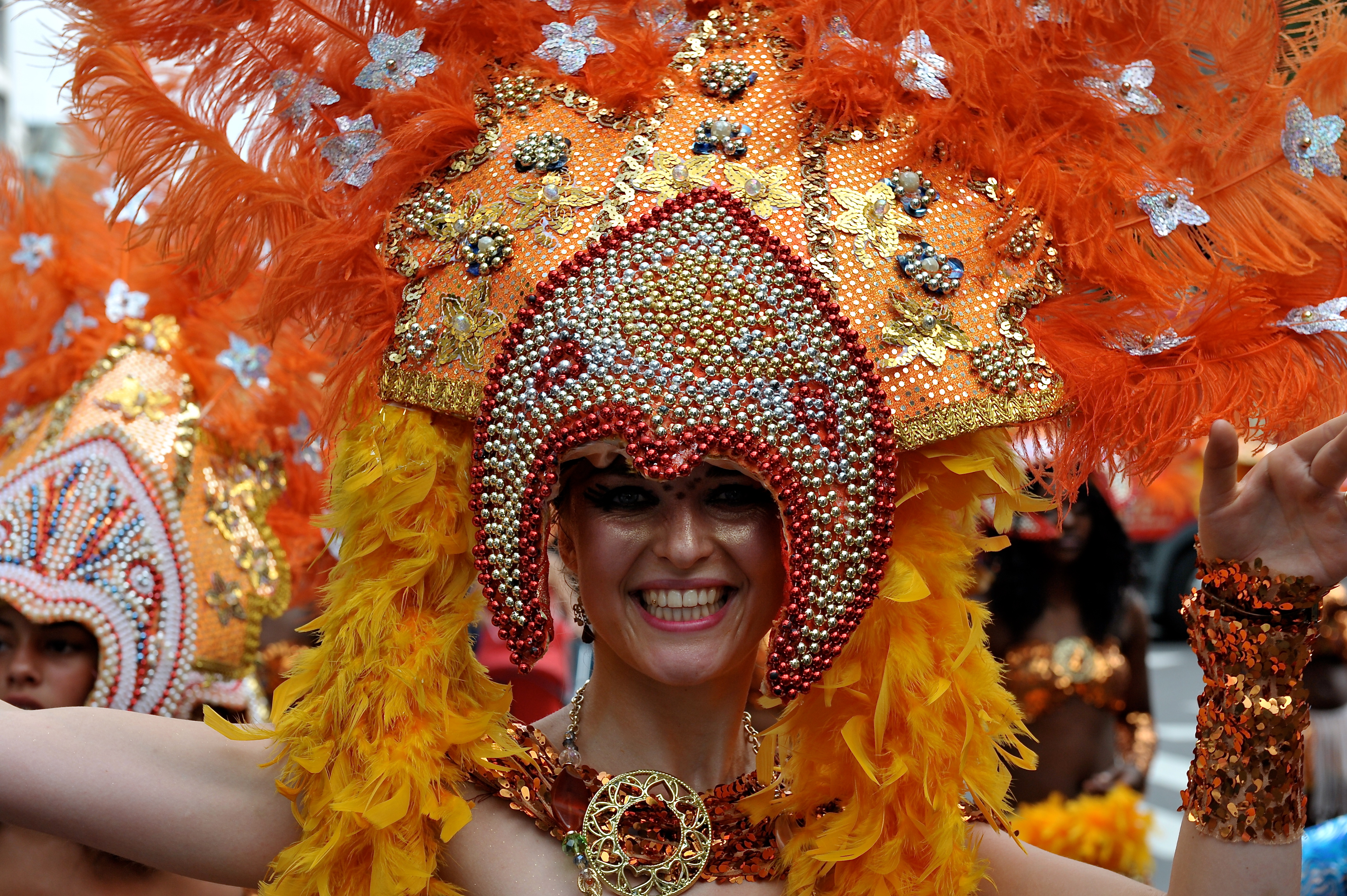
- Genre: Carnival
- Frequency: Annual
- Locations: Rotterdam, Netherlands

Rotterdam Summer Carnival
- UNESCO Intangible Cultural Heritage
- Country: Netherlands
- Reference: 01870
- Region: Europe and North America

Inscription history
- Inscription: 2023 (18th session)
- List: Representative

The Summer Carnaval (Dutch: Zomercarnaval) is an annual event in the Dutch city of Rotterdam. It mimics the Carnaval of Latin America and the Dutch Caribbean (Aruba, Bonaire & Curacao). The Summer Carnival offers people an opportunity to celebrate Carnival in such a manner. The Dutch city of Arnhem used to organize Rio on the Rhine, which attracted more than 150,000 visitors, while the Rotterdam event attracts nearly a million visitors yearly. Summer Carnaval is often compared to Karneval der Kulturen (Berlin) and Notting Hill Carnival (London). In 2001 the Carnival was honoured with the prestigious Dutch Prince Claus Award, for their work in promoting the positive contribution of Antillean culture to Dutch society.

== Zomercarnaval Rotterdam ==
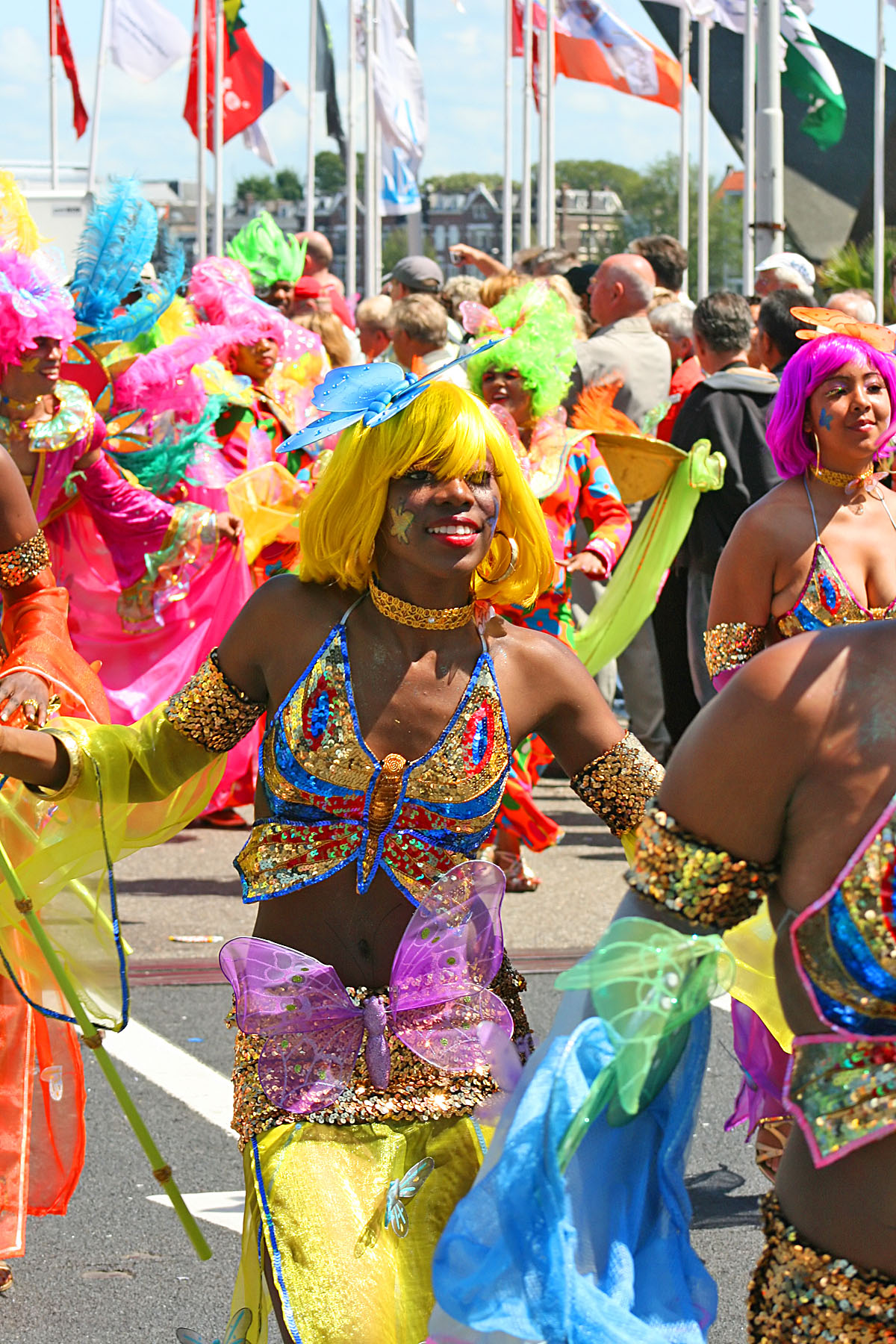
Zomercarnaval 2007

The first Zomercarnaval was held on August 4, 1984, in Rotterdam to allow residents to experience Carnival as celebrated in warmer climates, with the West Indies being a predominant influence. Zomercarnaval Rotterdam has become a multi-day event that attracts almost one million visitors every year.

Although the street parade attracts the most visitors the Zomercarnaval is a multi-day event. A week prior to the street parade the new Queen is elected in the official Zomercarnaval Queen Election. On the Thursday after the election the Zomercarnaval Beach Party is held at the Stand aan de Maas, a small beach created in the city center of Rotterdam. Several brass bands and DJ's show up and the newly chosen Queen is also present. On Friday evening the Battle of Drums is held, an event in which several brass bands compete to be named the official Zomercarnaval brass band and earn a spot in the parade the day after as well as in the Notting Hill Carnival in London. The preliminaries for the Battle of Drums are held at the Dunya Festival in Rotterdam. The street parade which is always held on Saturday includes brass bands and thousands of dancers. During and after the street parade there are two live on stage concerts at the Coolsingel and the Churchillplein until late in the evening.

In 2007 the Rotterdam carnival had an agreement with the Notting Hill Carnival for exchange of brass and steel bands.

=== Queens ===
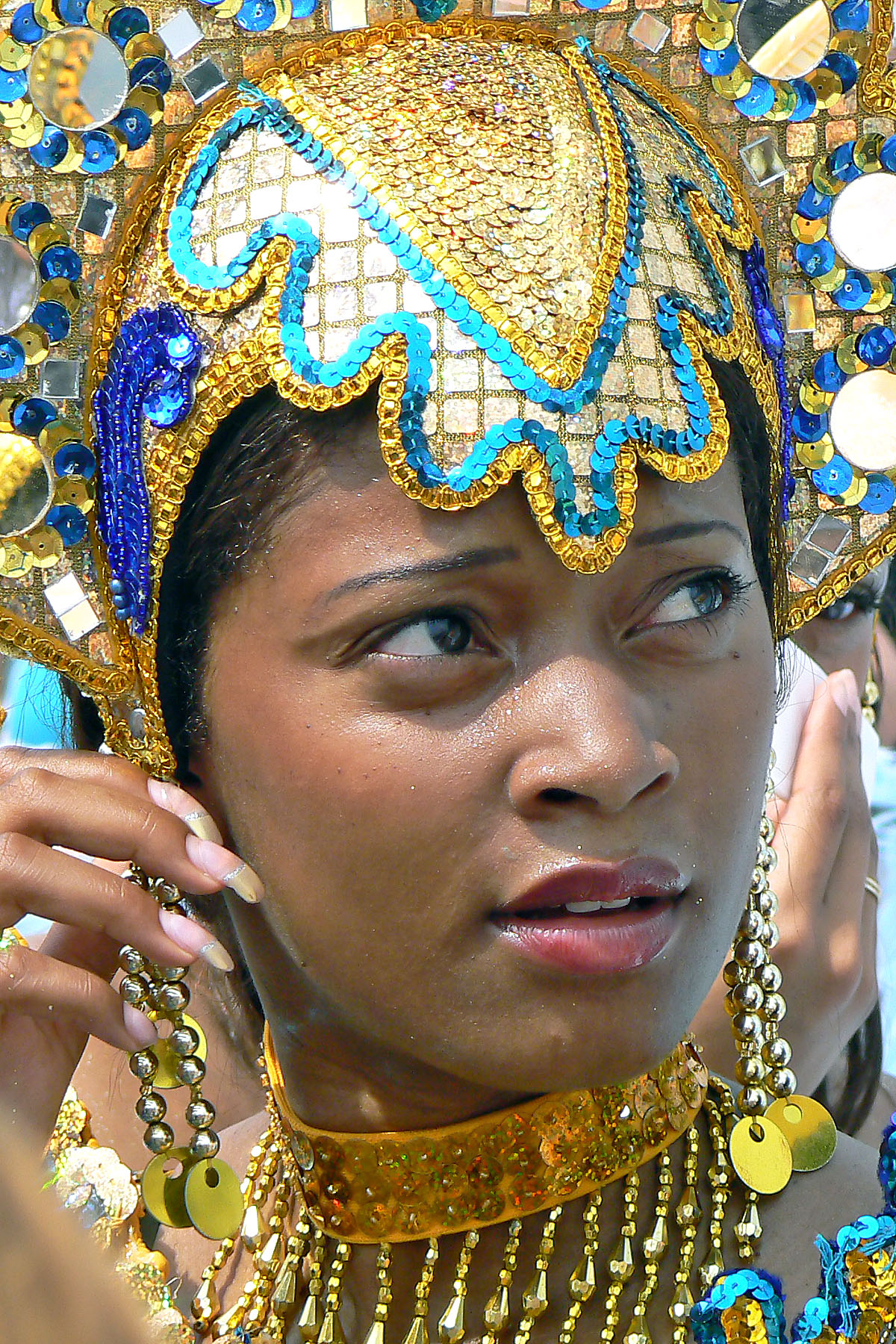
Queen Rotterdam 2006

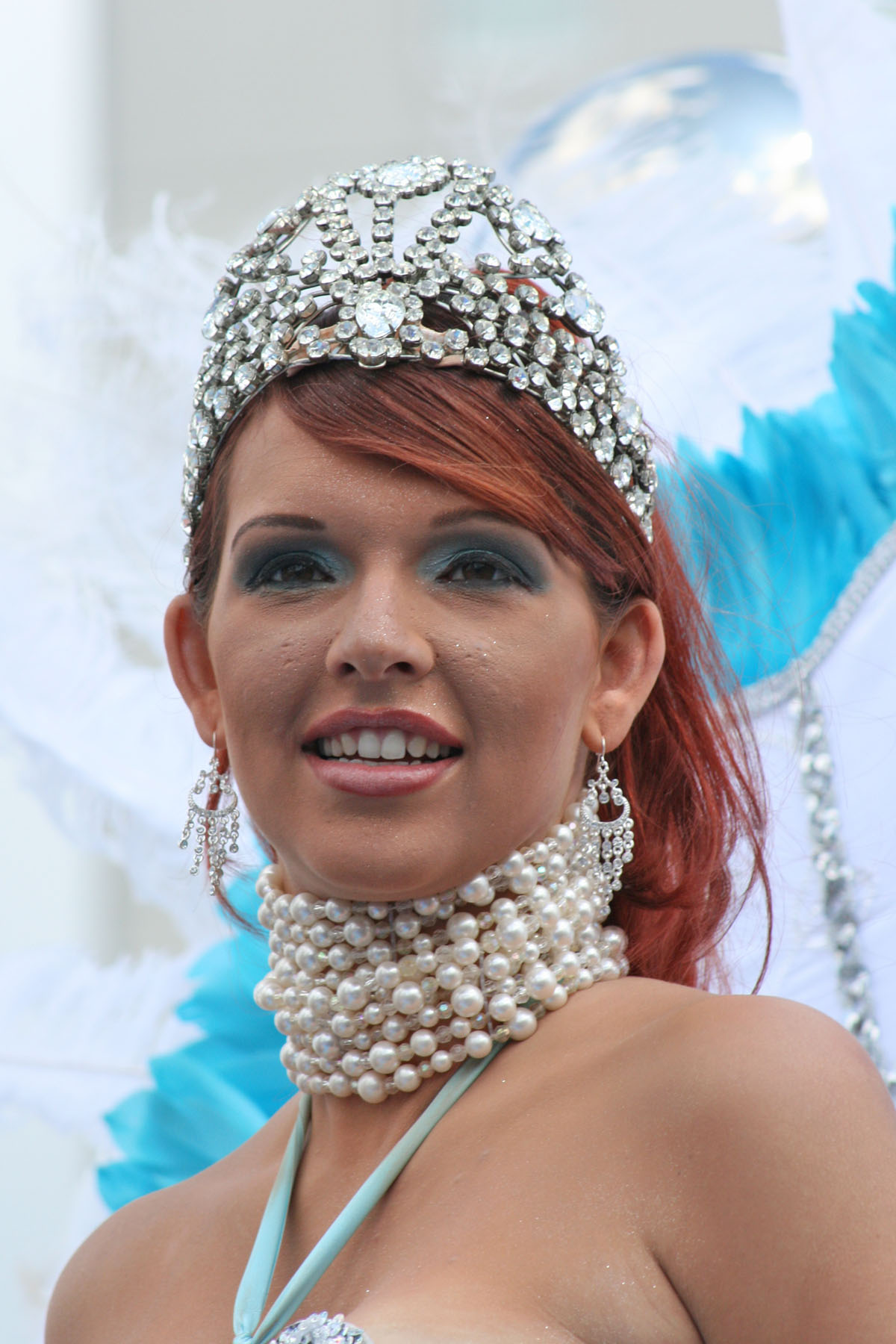
Queen Rotterdam 2007

- 2003: Patricia Tulen
- 2005: Imara Thomas
- 2006: Katy Cedeño Manzanillo was chosen to be the Queen of the 2006 Zomercarnaval in the Rotterdam Cruise Terminal on July 17, 2006. She is from Dominican descent and was part of the Grupo Carnaval Dominicano. In total eight contestants participated in the Queen Election, in which Lamya M'Haidra of Carnaval & Friends and Maria Elizabeth Kooij Martinez of Colores Latinos became second and third.
- 2007: Marcie de Jongh – Originally from Aruba Marcie de Jongh was chosen as the Queen of the 2007 Zomercarnaval. Again the election was held in the Rotterdam Cruise Terminal. She was part of the Kingdoms under the Sun Group from Amsterdam. The election was different from other years, where the candidates showed their skills in several rounds of various clothing types. This time they had to excel in communication and flair. Seven candidates challenged for the title. Behind De Jongh the second spot was for Diandra Bramble of Aruba Uni She lost with only 0,03 percent of the votes. Fabienne Kadirbaks of Caribbean Jewels won the third spot.
