= Henk Bos (footballer) =

Dutch footballer

Personal information
- Full name: Henk Bos
- Date of birth: 12 November 1992 (age 34)
- Place of birth: Stadskanaal, Netherlands
- Height: 1.72 m (5 ft 8 in)
- Position: Attacking midfielder

Youth career
- VV Musselkanaal
- 2003–2010: Groningen

Senior career*
Years	Team	Apps	(Gls)
2010–2016	Groningen	17	(0)
2015	→ Emmen (loan)	2	(0)
2016–2020	Emmen	50	(2)
- * Club domestic league appearances and goals as of 19 October 2020

Henk Bos (born 12 November 1992) is a Dutch footballer who plays as an attacking midfielder, most recently for Emmen.

== Club career ==
Bos formerly played for FC Groningen and joined Emmen in 2016.
