= Nigerians in the Netherlands =

Ethnic group

Nigerians in the Netherlands Nigerianen in Nederland

Total population
- 20,000 (2019)

Regions with significant populations
- Amsterdam, The Hague and Rotterdam

Languages
- Dutch, English, Nigerian languages

Religion
- Christianity

There is a small community of Nigerians in the Netherlands (Dutch: Nigerianen in Nederland), which began to grow in the late 1980s.

== Migration history ==
The earliest Nigerian asylum-seekers came to the Netherlands in 1987. As of 2006, the primary modes of migration of Nigerians are for marriage, work or study. Many of the Nigerians in the Netherlands for training are employees of Royal Dutch Shell. There is also some circular migration between Nigerians in the United Kingdom and in the Netherlands. One study, based on the cohort arriving in 1998, estimated that 25% of Nigerians who arrive in the Netherlands leave after four years. Nigerians point to the relative difficulty of finding work or starting businesses as a major driver for onward migration to the United Kingdom.

== Demographic characteristics ==
As of 2009, statistics of the Dutch Centraal Bureau voor de Statistiek with regards to people of Nigerian origin showed:

- 5,283 persons of first-generation background (3,037 men, 2,246 women)
- 4,170 persons of second-generation background (2,110 men, 2,060 women), of which:
  - 2,969 persons with one parent born in the Netherlands (1,507 men, 1,462 women)
  - 1,201 persons with both parents born outside the Netherlands (603 men, 598 women)

For a total of 9,453 persons (5,147 men, 4,306 women). This represented roughly three times the 1996 total of 3,136 persons. The population has shown a year-on-year increase every year since then. The proportion of second-generation Nigerians born in the Netherlands has also shown a consistent rise since 1996. The majority of Nigerian adults in the Netherlands are married, have children, and live in families, rather than alone.

== Employment ==
Nigerians have a relatively low unemployment rate compared to other migrant groups, as a result of the fact that most migrated for marriage or specifically for employment purposes, rather than as asylum-seekers. There are an estimated 500 Nigerians holding Dutch passports working for large Dutch and international organisations such as ABN AMRO, Nike, the United Nations, the former CMG Consulting, IBM Global Services, Celtel, Orange, Ingram Micro, KPN, and the trade unions federation FNV. However, many migrants complain that it is difficult to find work commensurate with their qualifications, and that companies impose Dutch-language requirements for even unskilled work such as cleaning.

== Notable people ==
- Arnaut Danjuma
- Joshua Zirkzee

== See also ==
- Afro-Dutch people
