= Timothy Fosu-Mensah =

Dutch footballer (born 1998)

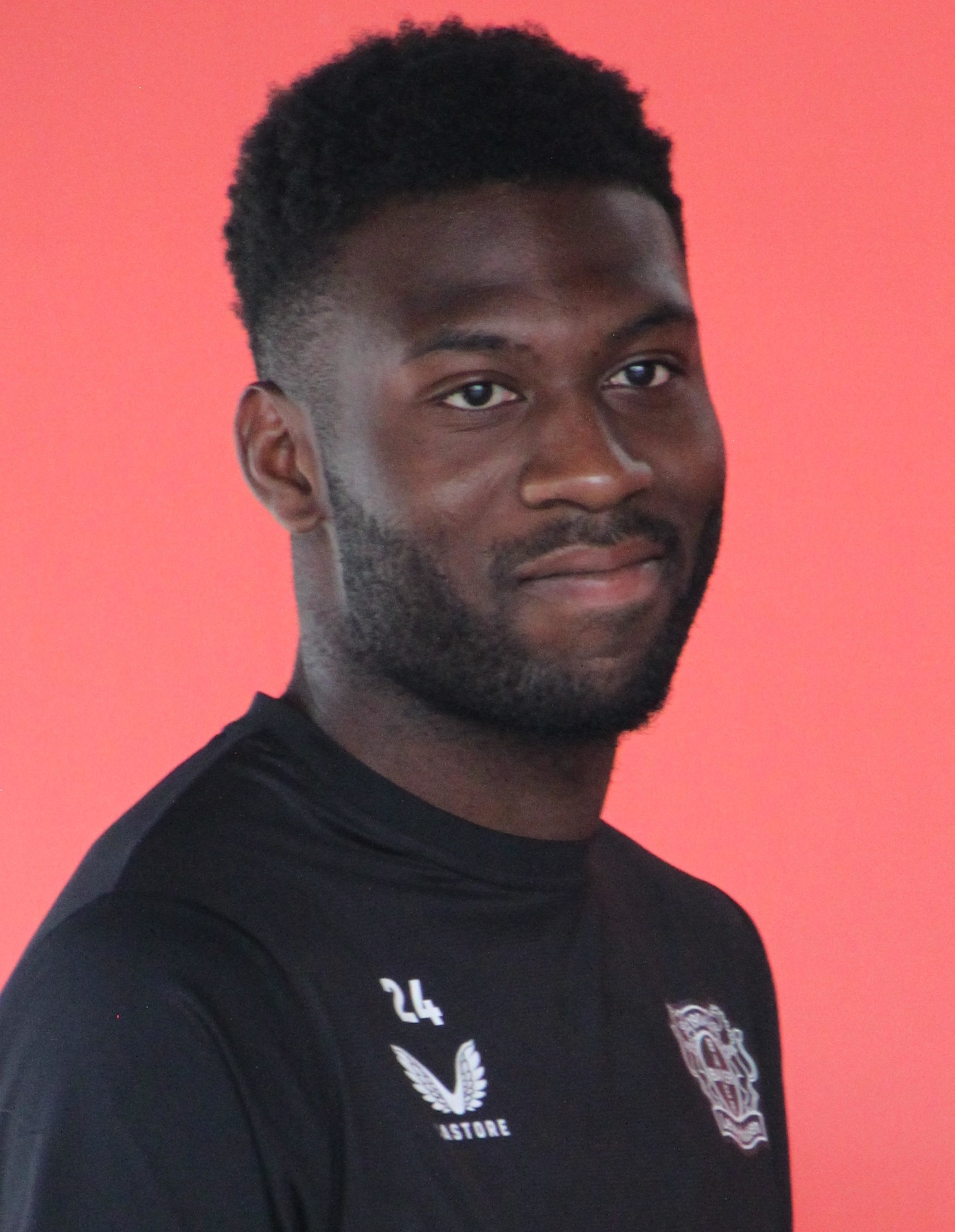
- Fosu-Mensah with Bayer Leverkusen in 2022

Personal information
- Full name: Evans Timothy Fosu Fosu-Mensah
- Date of birth: 2 January 1998 (age 28)
- Place of birth: Amsterdam, Netherlands
- Height: 1.85 m (6 ft 1 in)
- Positions: Defender; defensive midfielder

Youth career
- 2005–2006: US Créteil-Lusitanos
- 2006–2014: Ajax
- 2014–2016: Manchester United

Senior career*
Years	Team	Apps	(Gls)
2016–2021	Manchester United	16	(0)
2017–2018	→ Crystal Palace (loan)	21	(0)
2018–2019	→ Fulham (loan)	12	(0)
2021–2024	Bayer Leverkusen	23	(0)

International career
2013	Netherlands U15	4	(0)
2013–2014	Netherlands U16	7	(0)
2014–2015	Netherlands U17	13	(1)
2015–2017	Netherlands U19	10	(0)
2016	Netherlands U21	5	(0)
2017–2018	Netherlands	3	(0)
- * Club domestic league appearances and goals as of 18 May 2024 (UTC)

Evans Timothy Fosu Fosu-Mensah (born 2 January 1998) is a Dutch professional footballer who plays as a defensive midfielder, centre-back or full-back. He is currently a free agent.

He formerly played for Dutch club Ajax's youth team, and then for Manchester United and Bayer Leverkusen, also spending time on loan with fellow English clubs Crystal Palace and Fulham.

== Club career ==
=== Manchester United ===
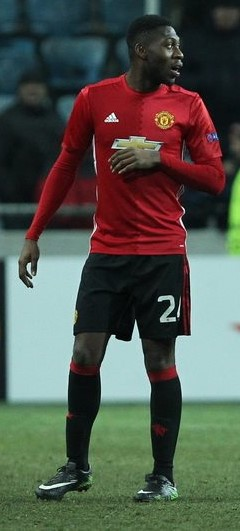
Fosu-Mensah playing with Manchester United in 2016

Born in Amsterdam to Ghanaian parents, Fosu-Mensah began his career with Ajax, before moving to England in 2014. Fosu-Mensah played for Manchester United's youth teams in a variety of positions, including centre-back, right-back and central midfield. He made his professional debut at left-back on 28 February 2016, in a 3–2 Premier League win at home to Arsenal, coming on as a 55th-minute substitute for Marcos Rojo.

On 19 October 2016, he signed a new long-term contract with Manchester United until 2020, with the option to extend for a further year.

==== Crystal Palace (on loan) ====
On 10 August 2017, Fosu-Mensah joined Crystal Palace on a season-long loan, reuniting with his former boss at Ajax, Frank de Boer. He made his debut for Palace two days later on 12 August 2017 against newly promoted Huddersfield Town, losing 3–0. Despite the defeat, Fosu-Mensah was praised for his last-minute tackle on Steve Mounié, denying him a hat-trick.

==== Fulham (on loan) ====
On 9 August 2018, Fosu-Mensah joined Fulham on a season-long loan. He made his debut for Fulham on 18 August 2018, in a 3–1 away defeat to Tottenham Hotspur in the Premier League, playing the full 90 minutes. On 13 April 2019, he suffered a knee ligament injury which saw him return to Manchester United.

==== Return to United ====
On 27 June 2020, Fosu-Mensah made his first United senior matchday squad since 21 May 2017 as he sat on the bench for 120 minutes in an FA Cup tie against Norwich City.

On 16 July 2020, Fosu-Mensah started for United against former side Crystal Palace, his first start since 21 May 2017, when he faced Palace at Selhurst Park. On 4 November, he made his UEFA Champions League debut in a 2–1 away defeat against İstanbul Başakşehir.

=== Bayer Leverkusen ===
On 13 January 2021, Fosu-Mensah completed a transfer from Manchester United to Bayer Leverkusen. A month later, on 28 February, he suffered another knee ligament injury that ended his 2020–21 season.

On 15 January 2022, Fosu-Mensah made his first appearance in 321 days, coming off the bench in the second half of a 2–1 win over Borussia Mönchengladbach. On 17 March, he sustained a hamstring injury during a Europa League match against Atalanta, sidelining him for the rest of the season. Later that year, on 4 October, he played his first Champions League match for the club in a 2–0 away defeat against Porto. Throughout the 2022–23 season, he featured in just 11 matches in Bundesliga, spending most of his time on the bench.

Later on, he was absent from all matches throughout Leverkusen's triumphant 2023–24 season, resulting in him missing out on the winner's medals, and he would subsequently depart the club at the end of the season.

== International career ==
Having played at under-15, under-16, under-17 and under-19 levels for the Netherlands but also eligible for Ghana, Fosu-Mensah was rewarded for his performances for Manchester United with his first call-up to the senior team for friendlies against the Republic of Ireland, Poland and Austria. He was also eligible to play for Ghana as he qualified through his parents. He received another call-up to the Dutch senior squad on 28 August 2017, replacing the injured Kenny Tete for the 2018 FIFA World Cup qualifiers against France and Bulgaria. Fosu-Mensah made his first senior appearance for the Netherlands on 31 August 2017, when he was named in the starting line-up against France in a 4–0 defeat.

== Personal life ==
Fosu-Mensah is the brother of fellow footballers Alfons and Paul.

== Career statistics ==
=== Club ===
As of match played 23 April 2023

Appearances and goals by club, season and competition
Club	Season	League			National cup (Note: Includes FA Cup, DFB-Pokal)		League cup (Note: Includes EFL Cup)		Europe		Other		Total	
Club	Season	Division	Apps	Goals	Apps	Goals	Apps	Goals	Apps	Goals	Apps	Goals	Apps	Goals
Manchester United	2015–16	Premier League	8	0	2	0	0	0	0	0	—		10	0
Manchester United	2016–17	Premier League	4	0	2	0	1	0	4 (Note: Appearances in UEFA Europa League)	0	0	0	11	0
Manchester United	2017–18	Premier League	0	0	0	0	0	0	0	0	0	0	0	0
Manchester United	2018–19	Premier League	0	0	0	0	0	0	0	0	—		0	0
Manchester United	2019–20	Premier League	3	0	1	0	0	0	2	0	—		6	0
Manchester United	2020–21	Premier League	1	0	0	0	0	0	2 (Note: Appearances in UEFA Champions League)	0	—		3	0
Manchester United	Total		16	0	5	0	1	0	8	0	0	0	30	0
Crystal Palace (loan)	2017–18	Premier League	21	0	1	0	2	0	—		—		24	0
Fulham (loan)	2018–19	Premier League	12	0	0	0	1	0	—		—		13	0
Bayer Leverkusen	2020–21	Bundesliga	6	0	1	0	—		0	0	—		7	0
Bayer Leverkusen	2021–22	Bundesliga	6	0	0	0	—		2	0	—		8	0
Bayer Leverkusen	2022–23	Bundesliga	11	0	0	0	—		4 (Note: Three appearances in UEFA Champions League, one appearance in UEFA Europa League)	0	—		15	0
Bayer Leverkusen	2023–24	Bundesliga	0	0	0	0	—		0	0	—		0	0
Bayer Leverkusen	Total		23	0	1	0	0	0	6	0	0	0	30	0
Career total			72	0	7	0	4	0	14	0	0	0	97	0

=== International ===
As of match played 26 March 2018

Appearances and goals by national team and year
National team	Year	Apps	Goals
Netherlands	2017	2	0
Netherlands	2018	1	0
Total		3	0

== Honours ==
Manchester United

- UEFA Europa League: 2016–17
