= 2019–20 Bayer 04 Leverkusen season =

Bayer Leverkusen
2019–20 season
- Owner: Bayer AG
- Managing director: Michael Schade
- Manager: Peter Bosz
- Stadium: BayArena
- Bundesliga: 5th
- DFB-Pokal: Runners-up
- UEFA Champions League: Group stage
- UEFA Europa League: Quarter-finals
- Top goalscorer: League: Kai Havertz (12); All: Kai Havertz (18)
Home colours	Away colours	Third colours

The 2019–20 Bayer 04 Leverkusen season was the 116th season in the football club's history and 41st consecutive and overall season in the top flight of German football, the Bundesliga, having been promoted from the 2. Bundesliga Nord in 1979. In addition to the domestic league, Bayer Leverkusen also participated in this season's editions of the domestic cup, the DFB-Pokal, and the top-tier continental cup, the UEFA Champions League, as well as the UEFA Europa League. This was the 61st season for Leverkusen in the BayArena, located in Leverkusen, North Rhine-Westphalia, Germany. The season covered a period from 1 July 2019 to 10 August 2020.

== Players ==
=== Squad information ===
As of 1 July 2020

Note: Flags indicate national team as defined under FIFA eligibility rules; some limited exceptions apply. Players may hold more than one non-FIFA nationality.

No.	Pos.	Nation	Player
1	GK	FIN	Lukas Hradecky
4	DF	GER	Jonathan Tah
5	MF	GER	Sven Bender
6	DF	AUT	Aleksandar Dragović
7	FW	BRA	Paulinho
8	MF	GER	Lars Bender (captain)
9	FW	JAM	Leon Bailey
10	MF	GER	Kerem Demirbay
11	MF	GER	Nadiem Amiri
12	DF	BFA	Edmond Tapsoba
13	FW	ARG	Lucas Alario
15	MF	AUT	Julian Baumgartlinger
18	DF	BRA	Wendell
19	FW	FRA	Moussa Diaby
20	MF	CHI	Charles Aránguiz

No.	Pos.	Nation	Player
21	GK	GER	Lennart Grill
22	DF	NED	Daley Sinkgraven
23	DF	GER	Mitchell Weiser
25	MF	ARG	Exequiel Palacios
27	MF	GER	Florian Wirtz
28	GK	AUT	Ramazan Özcan
29	MF	GER	Kai Havertz (3rd captain)
31	FW	GER	Kevin Volland (vice-captain)
35	MF	POL	Adrian Stanilewicz
36	GK	GER	Niklas Lomb
38	MF	GER	Karim Bellarabi
—	DF	GRE	Panagiotis Retsos
—	DF	CRO	Tin Jedvaj
—	FW	FIN	Joel Pohjanpalo

== Transfers ==
=== Transfers in ===
#	Position	Player	Transferred from	Fee	Date	Source
10	MF	(Germany) Kerem Demirbay	(Germany) 1899 Hoffenheim	€32,000,000	9 May 2019	
19	FW	(France) Moussa Diaby	(France) Paris Saint-Germain	€15,000,000	14 June 2019	
22	DF	(Netherlands) Daley Sinkgraven	(Netherlands) Ajax	€5,000,000	17 June 2019	
11	MF	(Germany) Nadiem Amiri	(Germany) 1899 Hoffenheim	€9,000,000	30 July 2019	
25	MF	(Argentina) Exequiel Palacios	(Argentina) River Plate	$21,500,000	20 December 2019	
12	DF	(Burkina Faso) Edmond Tapsoba	(Portugal) Vitória de Guimarães	$18,000,000	31 January 2020	
21	GK	(Germany) Lennart Grill	(Germany) 1. FC Kaiserslautern	€2,000,000	1 July 2020	

==== Loans in ====
#	Position	Player	Loaned from	Date	Loan expires	Source

=== Transfers out ===
#	Position	Player	Transferred to	Fee	Date	Source
10	FW	(Germany) Julian Brandt	(Germany) Borussia Dortmund	€25,000,000	22 May 2019	
24	GK	(Germany) Thorsten Kirschbaum	(Netherlands) VVV-Venlo	Free	27 May 2019	
30	MF	(Germany) Sam Schreck	(Netherlands) FC Groningen	Undisclosed	1 July 2019	
21	MF	(Germany) Dominik Kohr	(Germany) Eintracht Frankfurt	€8,500,000	3 July 2019	
33	MF	(Germany) Jan Boller	(Austria) LASK	Undisclosed	31 July 2019	
	GK	(Poland) Tomasz Kucz	(Portugal) Vitória de Guimarães	Free	31 July 2019	

==== Loans out ====
#	Position	Player	Loaned to	Date	Loan expires	Source
16	DF	(Croatia) Tin Jedvaj	(Germany) FC Augsburg	20 August 2019	30 June 2020	
17	FW	(Finland) Joel Pohjanpalo	(Germany) Hamburger SV	24 January 2020	30 June 2020	
3	DF	(Greece) Panagiotis Retsos	(England) Sheffield United	31 January 2020	30 June 2020	

== Pre-season and friendlies ==
Win Draw Loss

6 July 2019 Friendly	Wuppertaler SV	0–4	Bayer Leverkusen	Wuppertal, Germany
15:00 CEST (UTC+2)		Report	Bellarabi 26'; Volland 40'; Bender 44'; Pohjanpalo 74'	Stadium: Stadion am Zoo; Attendance: 2,400

13 July 2019 Friendly	Bayer Leverkusen	0–1	Fortuna Sittard	Cologne, Germany
15:00 CEST (UTC+2)		Report	Karjalainen 30'	Stadium: Jugendfussball-Zentrum Kurtekotten Platz 2 Attendance: 1,000

13 July 2019 Friendly	Bayer Leverkusen	3–4	Eupen	Cologne, Germany
18:30 CEST (UTC+2)	Paulinho 7'; Laurent 11' (o.g.); Azhil 33'	Report	Ciampichetti 42', 45'; Laurent 65'; Fünger 85' (o.g.)	Stadium: Jugendleistungszentrum Kurtekotten; Attendance: 1,000

20 July 2019 Friendly	Bayer Leverkusen	1–2	Watford	Zell am See, Austria
15:00 CEST (UTC+2)	Diaby 66'	Report	Hughes 35'; Gray 56'	Stadium: Alois Latini Stadion

20 July 2019 Friendly	Bayer Leverkusen	2–2	Eibar	Zell am See, Austria
18:30 CEST (UTC+2)	Alario 66', 85' (pen.)	Report	Bravo 33'; Benito 65'	Stadium: Alois Latini Stadion; Attendance: 500; Referee: Wolfram Aufschnaiter (Austria)

28 July 2019 Friendly	Bayer Leverkusen	3–4	Heracles	Cologne, Germany
16:00 CEST (UTC+2)				Stadium: Jugendleistungszentrum Kurtekotten

28 July 2019 Friendly	Bayer Leverkusen	1–1	Vitesse	Cologne, Germany
18:00 CEST (UTC+2)				Stadium: Jugendfussball-Zentrum Kurtekotten Platz 2

4 August 2019 Friendly	Bayer Leverkusen	1–2	Valencia	Leverkusen, Germany
14:00 CEST (UTC+2)	Demirbay (yellow card) 9'; Dragović (red card) 21'; Havertz 27' (pen.)	Report	Gameiro 10' (pen.), 57'; Kondogbia (yellow card) 37'; Parejo (yellow card) 67'	Stadium: BayArena; Referee: Sven Weschitzki (Germany)

10 January 2020 Friendly	Utrecht	4–3	Bayer Leverkusen	La Manga, Spain
14:00 CET (UTC+1)	Dalmau 17'; Klaiber 35'; Kerk 51'; Maddy 86'	Report	Havertz 54', 90'; Volland 80'	Stadium: La Manga Club Football Stadium; Attendance: 300

10 January 2020 Friendly	Bayer Leverkusen	3–2	St. Gallen	La Manga, Spain
16:00 CET (UTC+1)	Bailey 29'; Pohjanpalo 59'; Alario 69'	Report	Demirović 12', 32'	Stadium: La Manga Club Football Stadium

== Competitions ==
Win Draw Loss

=== Overview ===
Competition	First match	Last match	Starting round	Final position	Record							
Competition	First match	Last match	Starting round	Final position	Pld	W	D	L	GF	GA	GD	Win %
Bundesliga	17 August 2019	27 June 2020	Matchday 1	5th	34	19	6	9	61	44	+17	55.88
DFB-Pokal	10 August 2019	4 July 2020	First round	Runners-up	6	5	0	1	15	7	+8	83.33
Champions League	18 September 2019	11 December 2019	Group stage	Group stage	6	2	0	4	5	9	−4	33.33
Europa League	20 February 2020	10 August 2020	Round of 32	Quarter-finals	5	4	0	1	10	5	+5	80.00
Total					51	30	6	15	91	65	+26	58.82

Source: Competitions

=== Bundesliga ===
==== League table ====
Pos	Team	Pld	W	D	L	GF	GA	GD	Pts	Qualification or relegation
3	RB Leipzig	34	18	12	4	81	37	+44	66	Qualification for the Champions League group stage
4	Borussia Mönchengladbach	34	20	5	9	66	40	+26	65	Qualification for the Champions League group stage
5	Bayer Leverkusen	34	19	6	9	61	44	+17	63	Qualification for the Europa League group stage (Note: Since the winners of the 2019–20 DFB-Pokal, Bayern Munich, qualified for the Champions League based on league position, the Europa League group stage spot was passed to the sixth-placed team, and the Europa League second qualifying round spot was passed to the seventh-placed team.)
6	1899 Hoffenheim	34	15	7	12	53	53	0	52	Qualification for the Europa League group stage
7	VfL Wolfsburg	34	13	10	11	48	46	+2	49	Qualification for the Europa League second qualifying round

Source: DFB
Rules for classification: 1) Points; 2) Goal difference; 3) Goals scored; 4) Head-to-head results; 5) Head-to-head away goals scored; 6) Away goals scored; 7) Play-off.

==== Results summary ====
Overall								Home						Away					
Pld	W	D	L	GF	GA	GD	Pts	W	D	L	GF	GA	GD	W	D	L	GF	GA	GD
34	19	6	9	61	44	+17	63	9	4	4	32	22	+10	10	2	5	29	22	+7

Source: Bundesliga

==== Results by round ====
Round	1	2	3	4	5	6	7	8	9	10	11	12	13	14	15	16	17	18	19	20	21	22	23	24	25	26	27	28	29	30	31	32	33	34
Ground	H	A	H	A	H	A	H	A	H	H	A	H	A	H	A	H	A	A	H	A	H	A	H	A	H	A	A	H	A	H	A	H	A	H
Result	W	W	D	L	W	W	D	L	D	L	W	D	W	W	L	L	W	W	W	L	W	W	W	D	W	W	W	L	W	L	D	W	L	W
Position	5	5	4	8	7	6	7	9	8	10	8	9	7	6	7	7	6	6	5	5	5	5	5	5	4	5	4	5	5	5	4	4	5	5

Source: DFB
A = Away; H = Home; W = Win; D = Draw; L = Loss

==== Matches ====
The Bundesliga schedule was announced on 28 June 2019.

17 August 2019 1	Bayer Leverkusen	3–2	SC Paderborn	Leverkusen
15:30 CEST (UTC+2)	Bailey 10'; Havertz 19'; Wendell (yellow card) 25'; Dragović (yellow card) 62'; Volland 69'	Report	Michel 15'; Mamba 25'	Stadium: BayArena; Attendance: 26,208; Referee: Tobias Stieler

24 August 2019 2	Fortuna Düsseldorf	1–3	Bayer Leverkusen	Düsseldorf
15:30 CEST (UTC+2)	Baker (yellow card) 49'; Morales (yellow card) 61', (goal) 82'; Zimmermann (yellow card) 77'	Report	Baker 6' (o.g.); Aránguiz (yellow card) 14', (goal) 33'; Bellarabi 39'; Tah (yellow card) 80'	Stadium: Merkur Spiel-Arena; Attendance: 44,538; Referee: Patrick Ittrich

31 August 2019 3	Bayer Leverkusen	0–0	1899 Hoffenheim	Leverkusen
15:30 CEST (UTC+2)	Tah (yellow card) 90'; Alario (yellow card) 90+5'	Report	Posch (yellow card) 54'; Vogt (yellow card) 90+5'	Stadium: BayArena; Attendance: 26,506; Referee: Felix Zwayer

14 September 2019 4	Borussia Dortmund	4–0	Bayer Leverkusen	Dortmund
15:30 CEST (UTC+2)	Alcácer 28'; Reus 50', 90'; Guerreiro 83'	Report	Amiri (yellow card) 35'; Wendell (yellow card) 52'; Havertz (yellow card) 85'	Stadium: Signal Iduna Park; Attendance: 81,365; Referee: Daniel Siebert

21 September 2019 5	Bayer Leverkusen	2–0	Union Berlin	Leverkusen
15:30 CEST (UTC+2)	Volland 20'; Alario 25'	Report	Polter (red card) 66'; Schlotterbeck (yellow card) 86'	Stadium: BayArena; Attendance: 27,430; Referee: Robert Hartmann

28 September 2019 6	FC Augsburg	0–3	Bayer Leverkusen	Augsburg
15:30 CEST (UTC+2)	Max (yellow card) 19'; Lichtsteiner (yellow card) 45+1'; Vargas (yellow card) 63'; Schieber (yellow card) 75'	Report	Niederlechner 34' (o.g.); Volland 76'; Havertz 84'	Stadium: WWK Arena; Attendance: 27,113; Referee: Robert Kampka

5 October 2019 7	Bayer Leverkusen	1–1	RB Leipzig	Leverkusen
15:30 CEST (UTC+2)	Sinkgraven (yellow card) 45'; Volland 66'; Weiser (yellow card) 74'	Report	Demme (yellow card) 60'; Poulsen (yellow card) 73'; Nkunku 78'	Stadium: BayArena; Attendance: 26,355; Referee: Marco Fritz

18 October 2019 8	Eintracht Frankfurt	3–0	Bayer Leverkusen	Frankfurt
20:30 CEST (UTC+2)	Paciência 4', 17' (pen.); Fernandes (yellow card) 44'; Dost 80'	Report	Dragović (yellow card) 16'	Stadium: Commerzbank-Arena; Attendance: 50,800; Referee: Christian Dingert

26 October 2019 9	Bayer Leverkusen	2–2	Werder Bremen	Leverkusen
18:30 CEST (UTC+2)	Toprak 4' (o.g.); L. Bender (yellow card) 51'; Alario 58', (yellow card) 88'	Report	Rashica 40'; Klaassen 48', (yellow card) 76'	Stadium: BayArena; Attendance: 30,210; Referee: Martin Petersen

2 November 2019 10	Bayer Leverkusen	1–2	Borussia Mönchengladbach	Leverkusen
15:30 CET (UTC+1)	Volland 25'; Tah (yellow card) 36'; Baumgartlinger (yellow card) 44'; Bailey (red card) 90+6'	Report	Wendt 18'; Thuram 42'; Hofmann (yellow card) 80'	Stadium: BayArena; Attendance: 30,210; Referee: Daniel Siebert

10 November 2019 11	VfL Wolfsburg	0–2	Bayer Leverkusen	Wolfsburg
15:30 CET (UTC+1)	João Victor (yellow card) 45+1'; Tisserand (yellow card) 83'	Report	Bellarabi 25'; Volland (yellow card) 27'; Hradecky (yellow card) 90+2'; Paulinho 90+6'	Stadium: Volkswagen Arena; Attendance: 24,112; Referee: Manuel Gräfe

23 November 2019 12	Bayer Leverkusen	1–1	SC Freiburg	Leverkusen
15:30 CET (UTC+1)	Diaby 36'	Report	Höler 5'; Lienhart (yellow card) 46'; Schmid (yellow card) 59'; Höfler (yellow card) 65'	Stadium: BayArena; Attendance: 29,032; Referee: Deniz Aytekin

30 November 2019 13	Bayern Munich	1–2	Bayer Leverkusen	Munich
18:30 CET (UTC+1)	Müller 34'; Goretzka (yellow card) 90+6'	Report	Bailey 10', 35'; Baumgartlinger (yellow card) 42'; Tah (red card) 81'; Bellarabi (yellow card) 90+3'; S. Bender (yellow card) 90+4'	Stadium: Allianz Arena; Attendance: 75,000; Referee: Guido Winkmann

7 December 2019 14	Bayer Leverkusen	2–1	Schalke 04	Leverkusen
18:30 CET (UTC+1)	Alario 15', 81', (yellow card) 83'; Wendell (yellow card) 43'	Report	Caligiuri (yellow card) 29'; Raman (yellow card) 53', (goal) 82'	Stadium: BayArena; Attendance: 30,210; Referee: Harm Osmers

14 December 2019 15	1. FC Köln	2–0	Bayer Leverkusen	Cologne
15:30 CET (UTC+1)	Thielmann (yellow card) 39'; Córdoba 73'; Ehizibue (yellow card) 79'; Bornauw 84'	Report	Havertz (yellow card) 41'; Dragović (yellow card) 42' (yellow-red card) 62'; Bailey (red card) 78'	Stadium: RheinEnergieStadion; Attendance: 49,500; Referee: Manuel Gräfe

18 December 2019 16	Bayer Leverkusen	0–1	Hertha BSC	Leverkusen
18:30 CET (UTC+1)	Volland (yellow card) 71'; Paulinho (yellow card) 76'	Report	Grujić (yellow card) 29'; Rekik 64'; Skjelbred (yellow card) 75'; Dilrosun (yellow card) 86'	Stadium: BayArena; Attendance: 24,472; Referee: Bastian Dankert

21 December 2019 17	Mainz 05	0–1	Bayer Leverkusen	Mainz
15:30 CET (UTC+1)		Report	Wendell (yellow card) 58' (yellow-red card) 71'; Alario 90+3'	Stadium: Opel Arena; Attendance: 24,345; Referee: Patrick Ittrich

19 January 2020 18	SC Paderborn	1–4	Bayer Leverkusen	Paderborn
18:00 CET (UTC+1)	Vasiliadis (yellow card) 22'; Gjasula (yellow card) 35'; Srbeny 51'; Sabiri (yellow card) 73'	Report	Volland 11', 14'; Baumgartlinger 36'; Havertz 75', (yellow card) 90'	Stadium: Benteler-Arena; Attendance: 14,889; Referee: Daniel Siebert

26 January 2020 19	Bayer Leverkusen	3–0	Fortuna Düsseldorf	Leverkusen
18:00 CET (UTC+1)	Havertz 40'; L. Bender 79'; Alario 89' (pen.)	Report	Hoffmann (yellow card) 19'; Kownacki (yellow card) 86'; Hennings (yellow card) 87'	Stadium: BayArena; Attendance: 26,250; Referee: Daniel Schlager

1 February 2020 20	1899 Hoffenheim	2–1	Bayer Leverkusen	Sinsheim
15:30 CET (UTC+1)	Baumgartner (yellow card) 15'; Kramarić 23'; Rudy (yellow card) 48'; Skov 65'; Pentke (yellow card) 86'	Report	Diaby 11'; Demirbay (yellow card) 27' (yellow-red card) 90+2'; L. Bender (yellow card) 44'	Stadium: PreZero Arena; Attendance: 24,489; Referee: Deniz Aytekin

8 February 2020 21	Bayer Leverkusen	4–3	Borussia Dortmund	Leverkusen
18:30 CET (UTC+1)	Volland 20', 43', (yellow card) 67'; L. Bender (yellow card) 35', (goal) 82'; Bailey 81'	Report	Hummels 22'; Can 33'; Guerreiro (yellow card) 39', (goal) 65'	Stadium: BayArena; Attendance: 30,210; Referee: Markus Schmidt

15 February 2020 22	Union Berlin	2–3	Bayer Leverkusen	Berlin
15:30 CET (UTC+1)	Gentner 7', (yellow card) 56'; Trimmel (yellow card) 14'; Bülter 87'	Report	Weiser (yellow card) 20'; Havertz 22'; S. Bender (yellow card) 38'; Diaby 84'; Bellarabi 90+4'	Stadium: Stadion An der Alten Försterei; Attendance: 22,012; Referee: Harm Osmers

23 February 2020 23	Bayer Leverkusen	2–0	FC Augsburg	Leverkusen
15:30 CET (UTC+1)	Tapsoba (yellow card) 20'; Diaby 25'; Amiri 59'; Wendell (yellow card) 62'	Report	Khedira (yellow card) 15'; Gouweleeuw (yellow card) 20'; Jedvaj (yellow card) 32'; Baier (yellow card) 72'	Stadium: BayArena; Attendance: 23,703; Referee: Sven Jablonski

1 March 2020 24	RB Leipzig	1–1	Bayer Leverkusen	Leipzig
15:30 CET (UTC+1)	Schick 32'	Report	Demirbay (yellow card) 24'; Bailey 29'; Tah (yellow card) 39'; Diaby (yellow card) 90+3'	Stadium: Red Bull Arena; Attendance: 41,216; Referee: Felix Zwayer

7 March 2020 25	Bayer Leverkusen	4–0	Eintracht Frankfurt	Leverkusen
15:30 CET (UTC+1)	Havertz 4'; Bellarabi 14'; Paulinho 49', 55'; Weiser (yellow card) 54'	Report		Stadium: BayArena; Attendance: 30,210; Referee: Felix Brych

18 May 2020 26	Werder Bremen	1–4	Bayer Leverkusen	Bremen
20:30 CEST (UTC+2)	Gebre Selassie 30'; Moisander (yellow card) 54'; Friedl (yellow card) 75'	Report	Havertz 28', 33'; S. Bender (yellow card) 44'; Weiser 61'; Demirbay 78'	Stadium: Weser-Stadion; Attendance: 0 Referee: Tobias Stieler
Note: The match was postponed on 13 March due to the pandemic of COVID-19 in Germany, and rescheduled to 18 May.

23 May 2020 27	Borussia Mönchengladbach	1–3	Bayer Leverkusen	Mönchengladbach
15:30 CEST (UTC+2)	Thuram 52'; Bensebaini (yellow card) 71'	Report	Havertz 7', 58' (pen.); Diaby (yellow card) 62'; S. Bender 81'	Stadium: Borussia-Park; Attendance: 0 Referee: Sören Storks
Note: The match was postponed on 13 March due to the pandemic of COVID-19 in Germany, and rescheduled to 23 May.

26 May 2020 28	Bayer Leverkusen	1–4	VfL Wolfsburg	Leverkusen
20:30 CEST (UTC+2)	Demirbay (yellow card) 29'; Baumgartlinger (yellow card) 63', (goal) 86'; Diaby (yellow card) 67'	Report	João Victor (yellow card) 32'; Pongračić 43', 75'; Arnold 64'; Ginczek (yellow card) 67'; Steffen 68'; Casteels (yellow card) 71'	Stadium: BayArena; Attendance: 0 Referee: Daniel Schlager
Note: The match was postponed on 24 March due to the pandemic of COVID-19 in Germany, and rescheduled to 26 May.

29 May 2020 29	SC Freiburg	0–1	Bayer Leverkusen	Freiburg
20:30 CEST (UTC+2)		Report	Havertz 54'; Alario (yellow card) 81'; Amiri (yellow card) 90+2'	Stadium: Schwarzwald-Stadion; Attendance: 0 Referee: Marco Fritz
Note: The match was postponed on 24 March due to the pandemic of COVID-19 in Germany, and rescheduled to 29 May.

6 June 2020 30	Bayer Leverkusen	2–4	Bayern Munich	Leverkusen
15:30 CEST (UTC+2)	Alario 10'; Amiri (yellow card) 30'; Bellarabi (yellow card) 35'; Dragović (yellow card) 74'; Wirtz 89'	Report	Coman (yellow card) 8', (goal) 27'; Lewandowski (yellow card) 32', (goal) 66'; Müller (yellow card) 40'; Goretzka 42'; Gnabry 45'	Stadium: BayArena; Attendance: 0 Referee: Manuel Gräfe
Note: The match was postponed on 24 March due to the pandemic of COVID-19 in Germany, and rescheduled to 6 June.

14 June 2020 31	Schalke 04	1–1	Bayer Leverkusen	Gelsenkirchen
18:00 CEST (UTC+2)	Kabak (yellow card) 9'; Miranda (yellow card) 35'; Caligiuri 51' (pen.), (yellow card) 60'; McKennie (yellow card) 61'	Report	Alario (yellow card) 59'; Miranda 81' (o.g.)	Stadium: Veltins-Arena; Attendance: 0 Referee: Daniel Siebert
Note: The match was postponed on 24 March due to the pandemic of COVID-19 in Germany, and rescheduled to 14 June.

17 June 2020 32	Bayer Leverkusen	3–1	1. FC Köln	Leverkusen
20:30 CEST (UTC+2)	S. Bender 7'; Aránguiz (yellow card) 29'; Havertz 40'; Dragović (yellow card) 45'; Diaby 83'	Report	Czichos (yellow card) 21'; Bornauw 59'; Leistner (yellow card) 65'	Stadium: BayArena; Attendance: 0 Referee: Sven Jablonski
Note: The match was postponed on 24 March due to the pandemic of COVID-19 in Germany, and rescheduled to 17 June.

20 June 2020 33	Hertha BSC	2–0	Bayer Leverkusen	Berlin
15:30 CEST (UTC+2)	Cunha 22'; Lukebakio (yellow card) 45', (goal) 54'; Grujić (yellow card) 70'; Klünter (yellow card) 86'; Stark (yellow card) 90+2'	Report	Tapsoba (yellow card) 52'; Dragović (yellow card) 80'; Alario (yellow card) 83'	Stadium: Olympiastadion; Attendance: 0 Referee: Felix Brych
Note: The match was postponed on 24 March due to the pandemic of COVID-19 in Germany, and rescheduled to 20 June.

27 June 2020 34	Bayer Leverkusen	1–0	Mainz 05	Leverkusen
15:30 CEST (UTC+2)	Volland 2'; Baumgartlinger (yellow card) 90+1'	Report	Niakhaté (yellow card) 68'	Stadium: BayArena; Attendance: 0 Referee: Benjamin Cortus
Note: The match was postponed on 7 May due to the pandemic of COVID-19 in Germany, and rescheduled to 27 June.

=== DFB-Pokal ===
10 August 2019 First round	Alemannia Aachen	1–4	Bayer Leverkusen	Aachen
15:30 CEST (UTC+2)	Wallenborn (yellow card) 21'; Batarilo 56'	Report	Hackenberg 19' (o.g.); Volland 39'; Bailey 72'; Havertz 88'	Stadium: New Tivoli; Attendance: 30,861; Referee: Martin Petersen

29 October 2019 Second round	Bayer Leverkusen	1–0	SC Paderborn	Leverkusen
20:45 CET (UTC+1)	Alario 26'; Weiser (yellow card) 70'	Report	Gjasula (yellow card) 40'	Stadium: BayArena; Attendance: 14,000; Referee: Sven Jablonski

5 February 2020 Round of 16	Bayer Leverkusen	2–1	VfB Stuttgart	Leverkusen
18:30 CET (UTC+1)	Weiser (yellow card) 30'; Bredlow 72' (o.g.); Alario 83'; Hradecky (yellow card) 85'	Report	Silas 85'; Castro (yellow card) 90'	Stadium: BayArena; Attendance: 20,000; Referee: Bibiana Steinhaus

4 March 2020 Quarter-finals	Bayer Leverkusen	3–1	Union Berlin	Leverkusen
18:30 CET (UTC+1)	Tah (yellow card) 44'; Aránguiz (yellow card) 55', (goal) 86'; Diaby (yellow card) 69', (goal) 90+1'; Bellarabi (yellow card) 70', (goal) 72'; Alario (yellow card) 90+2'	Report	Ingvartsen 39'; Parensen (yellow card) 48'; Lenz (yellow card) 61' (yellow-red card) 71'; Gikiewicz (yellow card) 90+2'	Stadium: BayArena; Attendance: 18,453; Referee: Benjamin Cortus

9 June 2020 Semi-finals	1. FC Saarbrücken	0–3	Bayer Leverkusen	Völklingen
20:45 CEST (UTC+2)		Report	Tapsoba (yellow card) 7'; Diaby 11'; Alario 19'; Bellarabi 58'	Stadium: Hermann-Neuberger-Stadion; Attendance: 0 Referee: Guido Winkmann
Note: The match was postponed on 27 March due to the pandemic of COVID-19 in Germany, and rescheduled to 9 June.

4 July 2020 Final	Bayer Leverkusen	2–4	Bayern Munich	Berlin
20:00 CEST (UTC+2)	Wendell (yellow card) 28'; S. Bender 63'; Havertz 90+5' (pen.)	Report	Alaba 16'; Gnabry 24'; Lewandowski 59', 89', (yellow card) 67'	Stadium: Olympiastadion; Attendance: 0 Referee: Tobias Welz
Note: The match originally scheduled for 23 May, was postponed on 24 April due to the pandemic of COVID-19 in Germany, and rescheduled to 4 July.

=== UEFA Champions League ===
==== Group stage ====
Pos	Team	Pld	W	D	L	GF	GA	GD	Pts	Qualification	JUV	ATM	LEV	LMO
1	(Italy) Juventus	6	5	1	0	12	4	+8	16	Advance to knockout phase	—	1–0	3–0	2–1
2	(Spain) Atlético Madrid	6	3	1	2	8	5	+3	10	Advance to knockout phase	2–2	—	1–0	2–0
3	(Germany) Bayer Leverkusen	6	2	0	4	5	9	−4	6	Transfer to Europa League	0–2	2–1	—	1–2
4	(Russia) Lokomotiv Moscow	6	1	0	5	4	11	−7	3		1–2	0–2	0–2	—

Source: UEFA
Rules for classification: Group stage tiebreakers

18 September 2019 1	Bayer Leverkusen (Germany)	1–2	(Russia) Lokomotiv Moscow	Leverkusen, Germany
21:00 CEST (UTC+2)	Höwedes 25' (o.g.); Aránguiz (yellow card) 76'	Report	Krychowiak 16'; Barinov 37', (yellow card) 55'	Stadium: BayArena; Attendance: 26,592; Referee: Paweł Raczkowski (Poland)

1 October 2019 2	Juventus (Italy)	3–0	(Germany) Bayer Leverkusen	Turin, Italy
21:00 CEST (UTC+2)	Higuaín 17'; Cuadrado (yellow card) 55'; Bernardeschi 62'; Ronaldo 89'	Report	Aránguiz (yellow card) 19'	Stadium: Juventus Stadium; Attendance: 34,525; Referee: Willie Collum (Scotland)

22 October 2019 3	Atlético Madrid (Spain)	1–0	(Germany) Bayer Leverkusen	Madrid, Spain
18:55 CEST (UTC+2)	Koke (yellow card) 54'; Morata 78'	Report	Bellarabi (yellow card) 38'	Stadium: Wanda Metropolitano; Attendance: 56,776; Referee: Artur Soares Dias (Portugal)

6 November 2019 4	Bayer Leverkusen (Germany)	2–1	(Spain) Atlético Madrid	Leverkusen, Germany
21:00 CET (UTC+1)	Partey 41' (o.g.); Weiser (yellow card) 50'; Volland 55'; Bellarabi (yellow card) 79'; Tah (yellow card) 79'; Amiri (red card) 84'	Report	Oblak (yellow card) 79'; Morata (yellow card) 79', (goal) 90+4'	Stadium: BayArena; Attendance: 28,160; Referee: Damir Skomina (Slovenia)

26 November 2019 5	Lokomotiv Moscow (Russia)	0–2	(Germany) Bayer Leverkusen	Moscow, Russia
18:55 CET (UTC+1)	Höwedes (yellow card) 43'; Ignatyev (yellow card) 67'; Ćorluka (yellow card) 68'; Barinov (yellow card) 83'	Report	Zhemaletdinov 11' (o.g.); S. Bender 54'; Wendell (yellow card) 77'	Stadium: RZD Arena; Attendance: 25,757; Referee: Michael Oliver (England)

11 December 2019 6	Bayer Leverkusen (Germany)	0–2	(Italy) Juventus	Leverkusen, Germany
21:00 CET (UTC+1)		Report	Ronaldo 75'; Higuaín 90+2'	Stadium: BayArena; Attendance: 29,542; Referee: Benoît Bastien (France)

=== UEFA Europa League ===
==== Knockout phase ====
===== Round of 32 =====
20 February 2020 First leg	Bayer Leverkusen (Germany)	2–1	(Portugal) Porto	Leverkusen, Germany
21:00 CET (UTC+1)	Alario 29'; Havertz 57' (pen.); Demirbay (yellow card) 66'	Report	Corona (yellow card) 26'; Manafá (yellow card) 54'; Uribe (yellow card) 58'; Díaz 73'; Marcano (yellow card) 90+2'	Stadium: BayArena; Attendance: 26,839; Referee: Slavko Vinčić (Slovenia)

27 February 2020 Second leg	Porto (Portugal)	1–3 (2–5 agg.)	(Germany) Bayer Leverkusen	Porto, Portugal
18:55 CET (UTC+1)	Zé Luís (yellow card) 33'; Oliveira (yellow card) 36'; Uribe (yellow card) 42'; Marcano (yellow card) 54'; Marega 65'; Nakajima (yellow card) 76'; Pepe (yellow card) 82'; Soares (red card) 85'	Report	Alario 10'; L. Bender (yellow card) 43'; Demirbay 50', (yellow card) 67'; Havertz 58'; Weiser (yellow card) 69'; Amiri (yellow card) 82'	Stadium: Estádio do Dragão; Attendance: 30,292; Referee: István Kovács (Romania)

===== Round of 16 =====
12 March 2020 First leg	Rangers (Scotland)	1–3	(Germany) Bayer Leverkusen	Glasgow, Scotland
21:00 CET (UTC+1)	Kamara (yellow card) 20'; Arfield (yellow card) 73'; Edmundson 75'; Kent (yellow card) 90'	Report	Demirbay (yellow card) 29'; Havertz 37' (pen.); Aránguiz 67'; Wendell (yellow card) 77'; Weiser (yellow card) 81'; Diaby (yellow card) 86'; Bailey 88'	Stadium: Ibrox Stadium; Attendance: 47,494; Referee: Szymon Marciniak (Poland)

6 August 2020 Second leg	Bayer Leverkusen (Germany)	1–0 (4–1 agg.)	(Scotland) Rangers	Leverkusen, Germany
18:55 CEST (UTC+2)	Aránguiz (yellow card) 14'; Sinkgraven (yellow card) 45+2'; Diaby 51'; Tah (yellow card) 90'	Report	Barker (yellow card) 53'; Hagi (yellow card) 67'	Stadium: BayArena; Attendance: 0 Referee: Danny Makkelie (Netherlands)
Note: The match between Bayer Leverkusen and Rangers in Leverkusen was meant to be played behind closed doors due to an outbreak of COVID-19 in Germany. However, on 13 March, all of the round of 16 second leg matches, originally scheduled to be played on 19 March, were indefinitely postponed due to a pandemic of COVID-19 in Europe. The match was rescheduled on 17 June to 6 August.

===== Quarter-finals =====
10 August 2020 Quarter-finals	Inter Milan (Italy)	2–1	(Germany) Bayer Leverkusen	Düsseldorf, Germany
21:00 CEST (UTC+2)	Barella 15', (yellow card) 90+7'; Lukaku 21'; D'Ambrosio (yellow card) 32'; Eriksen (yellow card) 85'	Report	Havertz 24'; Sinkgraven (yellow card) 43'; L. Bender (yellow card) 48'; Tapsoba (yellow card) 87'	Stadium: Merkur Spiel-Arena; Attendance: 0 Referee: Carlos del Cerro Grande (Spain)

== Statistics ==
=== Appearances and goals ===
No.	Pos	Nat	Player	Total		Bundesliga		DFB-Pokal		Champions League		Europa League	
No.	Pos	Nat	Player	Apps	Goals	Apps	Goals	Apps	Goals	Apps	Goals	Apps	Goals
Goalkeepers
1	GK	(Finland) FIN	Lukas Hradecky	50	0	34	0	5	0	6	0	5	0
28	GK	(Austria) AUT	Ramazan Özcan	1	0	0	0	1	0	0	0	0	0
36	GK	(Germany) GER	Niklas Lomb	0	0	0	0	0	0	0	0	0	0
Defenders
4	DF	(Germany) GER	Jonathan Tah	39	0	22+3	0	3+2	0	5	0	3+1	0
6	DF	(Austria) AUT	Aleksandar Dragović	25	0	10+5	0	3+1	0	1+2	0	1+2	0
12	DF	(Burkina Faso) BFA	Edmond Tapsoba	22	0	12+2	0	3	0	0	0	5	0
18	DF	(Brazil) BRA	Wendell	34	0	21+3	0	3+1	0	4	0	1+1	0
22	DF	(Netherlands) NED	Daley Sinkgraven	21	0	11+2	0	2	0	1+1	0	4	0
23	DF	(Germany) GER	Mitchell Weiser	28	1	14+4	1	3+2	0	3	0	1+1	0
Midfielders
5	MF	(Germany) GER	Sven Bender	46	4	32	2	5	1	6	1	3	0
8	MF	(Germany) GER	Lars Bender	29	2	17+2	2	2	0	3+1	0	4	0
10	MF	(Germany) GER	Kerem Demirbay	40	2	18+7	1	4+2	0	5	0	4	1
11	MF	(Germany) GER	Nadiem Amiri	43	1	22+9	1	4+1	0	2+2	0	2+1	0
15	MF	(Austria) AUT	Julian Baumgartlinger	40	2	20+7	2	2+1	0	3+3	0	1+3	0
20	MF	(Chile) CHI	Charles Aránguiz	39	3	23+4	1	4	1	5	0	3	1
25	MF	(Argentina) ARG	Exequiel Palacios	7	0	2+1	0	1+1	0	0	0	2	0
27	MF	(Germany) GER	Florian Wirtz	9	1	3+4	1	1	0	0	0	1	0
29	MF	(Germany) GER	Kai Havertz	45	18	29+1	12	5	2	5	0	5	4
35	MF	(Poland) POL	Adrian Stanilewicz	1	0	0	0	0	0	0	0	0+1	0
38	MF	(Germany) GER	Karim Bellarabi	39	6	17+9	4	3+3	2	5	0	1+1	0
Forwards
7	FW	(Brazil) BRA	Paulinho	19	3	1+12	3	1+1	0	0+2	0	0+2	0
9	FW	(Jamaica) JAM	Leon Bailey	33	7	12+10	5	2+1	1	2+1	0	0+5	1
13	FW	(Argentina) ARG	Lucas Alario	36	12	11+13	7	4	3	2+3	0	2+1	2
19	FW	(France) FRA	Moussa Diaby	39	8	18+10	5	3+2	2	2	0	4	1
31	FW	(Germany) GER	Kevin Volland	40	12	24+3	10	2+2	1	5+1	1	3	0
Players transferred out during the season
3	DF	(Greece) GRE	Panagiotis Retsos	6	0	1+2	0	0+1	0	1+1	0	0	0
16	DF	(Croatia) CRO	Tin Jedvaj	0	0	0	0	0	0	0	0	0	0
17	FW	(Finland) FIN	Joel Pohjanpalo	1	0	0+1	0	0	0	0	0	0	0

Last updated: 10 August 2020
Source: Competitions
