= 2018–19 Bayer 04 Leverkusen season =

Bayer Leverkusen
2018–19 season
- Owner: Bayer AG
- Managing director: Michael Schade
- Manager: Heiko Herrlich (until 23 December); Peter Bosz (from 4 January)
- Stadium: BayArena
- Bundesliga: 4th
- DFB-Pokal: Round of 16
- Europa League: Round of 32
- Top goalscorer: League: Kai Havertz (17 goals); All: Kai Havertz (19 goals)
- Biggest win: Gladbach 0–5 Leverkusen; Leverkusen 6–1 Frankfurt
- Biggest defeat: Leverkusen 1–4 Hoffenheim; Leipzig 3–0 Leverkusen; Hoffenheim 4–1 Leverkusen
Home colours	Away colours	Third colours

The 2018–19 Bayer 04 Leverkusen season was the 115th season in the football club's history and 40th consecutive and overall season in the top flight of German football, the Bundesliga, having been promoted from the 2. Bundesliga Nord in 1979.

In addition to the domestic league, Bayer Leverkusen also participated in this season's editions of the domestic cup, the DFB-Pokal, and the second-tier continental cup, the UEFA Europa League. This was the 61st season for Leverkusen in the BayArena, located in Leverkusen, North Rhine-Westphalia, Germany. The season covered a period from 1 July 2018 to 30 June 2019.

The season was the first since 2005–06 without Stefan Kießling, who retired after the 2017–18 campaign.

== Players ==
=== Squad information ===
As of 11 February 2019

Note: Flags indicate national team as defined under FIFA eligibility rules; some limited exceptions apply. Players may hold more than one non-FIFA nationality.

No.	Pos.	Nation	Player
1	GK	FIN	Lukáš Hrádecký
3	DF	GRE	Panagiotis Retsos
4	DF	GER	Jonathan Tah
5	MF	GER	Sven Bender
6	DF	AUT	Aleksandar Dragović
7	FW	BRA	Paulinho
8	MF	GER	Lars Bender (captain)
9	FW	JAM	Leon Bailey
10	FW	GER	Julian Brandt
11	FW	SWE	Isaac Kiese Thelin (on loan from Anderlecht)
13	FW	ARG	Lucas Alario
15	MF	AUT	Julian Baumgartlinger (3rd captain)
16	DF	CRO	Tin Jedvaj

No.	Pos.	Nation	Player
17	FW	FIN	Joel Pohjanpalo
18	DF	BRA	Wendell
20	MF	CHI	Charles Aránguiz
21	MF	GER	Dominik Kohr
23	DF	GER	Mitchell Weiser
24	GK	GER	Thorsten Kirschbaum
28	GK	AUT	Ramazan Özcan
29	MF	GER	Kai Havertz
30	MF	GER	Sam Schreck
31	FW	GER	Kevin Volland (vice-captain)
33	DF	GER	Jan Boller
35	MF	POL	Adrian Stanilewicz
38	MF	GER	Karim Bellarabi

=== Players out on loan ===
Note: Flags indicate national team as defined under FIFA eligibility rules; some limited exceptions apply. Players may hold more than one non-FIFA nationality.

No.	Pos.	Nation	Player
—	GK	GER	Niklas Lomb (at SV Sandhausen until 30 June 2019)
—	GK	POL	Tomasz Kucz (at Dunajská Streda until 30 June 2019)

=== Transfers ===
==== In ====
No.	Pos	Player	From	Type	Window	Ends	Fee	Source
1	GK	(Finland) Lukáš Hrádecký	Eintracht Frankfurt	Transfer	Summer	2023	Free	
6	DF	(Austria) Aleksandar Dragović	(England) Leicester City	Loan return	Summer	2021	Free	
7	FW	(Brazil) Paulinho	(Brazil) Vasco da Gama	Transfer	Summer	2020	€18,500,000	
23	DF	(Germany) Mitchell Weiser	Hertha BSC	Transfer	Summer	2023	€12,000,000	
24	GK	(Germany) Thorsten Kirschbaum	1. FC Nürnberg	Transfer	Summer	2019	Free	
30	FW	(Germany) Sam Schreck	Bayer Leverkusen U19	Promoted to first team	Summer	2021	Free	
32	FW	(Poland) Jakub Bednarczyk	Bayer Leverkusen U19	Promoted to first team	Summer	2019	Free	
35	FW	(Germany) Chinedu Ekene	Bayer Leverkusen U19	Promoted to first team	Summer	2019	Free	
40	GK	(Poland) Tomasz Kucz	Bayer Leverkusen U19	Promoted to first team	Summer	2019	Free	
—	FW	(Germany) Dennis Mbay	Bayer Leverkusen U19	Promoted to first team	Summer	2019	Free	

==== Out ====
No.	Pos	Player	To	Type	Window	Fee	Source
1	GK	(Germany) Bernd Leno	(England) Arsenal	Transfer	Summer	€25,000,000	
11	FW	(Germany) Stefan Kießling	Retired	Released	Summer	Free	
22	MF	(Ukraine) Vladlen Yurchenko		Released	Summer	Free	
36	GK	(Germany) Niklas Lomb	SV Sandhausen	Loan	Summer	Free	
37	MF	(Germany) Marlon Frey		Released	Summer	Free	

== Friendly matches ==
Win Draw Loss

8 January 2019 Friendly	Bayer Leverkusen	4–0	Twente	Leverkusen, Germany
14:00 CET (UTC+1)	Alario 32'; Kohr 39'; Volland 57'; Bailey 77'	Report		Stadium: BayArena

== Competitions ==
Win Draw Loss

=== Overview ===
Competition	First match	Last match	Starting round	Final position	Record							
Competition	First match	Last match	Starting round	Final position	Pld	W	D	L	GF	GA	GD	Win %
Bundesliga	25 August 2018	18 May 2019	Matchday 1		34	18	4	12	69	52	+17	52.94
DFB-Pokal	18 August 2018	5 February 2019	First round	Round of 16	3	2	0	1	7	2	+5	66.67
Europa League	20 September 2018	21 February 2019	Group stage	Round of 32	8	4	3	1	17	10	+7	50.00
Total					45	24	7	14	93	64	+29	53.33

Last updated: 25 May 2019
Source: Competitions

=== Bundesliga ===
==== League table ====
Pos	Team	Pld	W	D	L	GF	GA	GD	Pts	Qualification or relegation
2	Borussia Dortmund	34	23	7	4	81	44	+37	76	Qualification for the Champions League group stage
3	RB Leipzig	34	19	9	6	63	29	+34	66	Qualification for the Champions League group stage
4	Bayer Leverkusen	34	18	4	12	69	52	+17	58	Qualification for the Champions League group stage
5	Borussia Mönchengladbach	34	16	7	11	55	42	+13	55	Qualification for the Europa League group stage (Note: Since the winners of the 2018–19 DFB-Pokal, Bayern Munich, qualified for the Champions League based on league position, the Europa League group stage spot was passed to the sixth-placed team, and the Europa League second qualifying round spot was passed to the seventh-placed team.)
6	VfL Wolfsburg	34	16	7	11	62	50	+12	55	Qualification for the Europa League group stage

Source: DFB
Rules for classification: 1) Points; 2) Goal difference; 3) Goals scored; 4) Head-to-head results; 5) Head-to-head away goals scored; 6) Away goals scored; 7) Play-off

==== Results summary ====
Overall								Home						Away					
Pld	W	D	L	GF	GA	GD	Pts	W	D	L	GF	GA	GD	W	D	L	GF	GA	GD
34	18	4	12	69	52	+17	58	9	2	6	32	25	+7	9	2	6	37	27	+10

Last updated: 25 May 2019.
Source: Bundesliga

==== Results by round ====
Round	1	2	3	4	5	6	7	8	9	10	11	12	13	14	15	16	17	18	19	20	21	22	23	24	25	26	27	28	29	30	31	32	33	34
Ground	A	H	A	H	A	H	A	H	A	H	A	H	A	H	A	A	H	H	A	H	A	H	A	H	A	H	A	H	A	H	A	H	H	A
Result	L	L	L	W	W	L	D	D	W	L	L	W	D	W	L	W	W	L	W	W	W	W	L	W	L	L	L	L	W	W	W	W	D	W
Position	16	16	18	15	11	14	14	13	12	13	13	12	11	11	11	10	9	10	9	7	6	5	7	6	6	6	7	9	8	7	6	5	5	4

Updated to match(es) played on 25 May 2019. Source: DFB
A = Away; H = Home; W = Win; D = Draw; L = Loss

==== Matches ====
25 August 2018 1	Borussia Mönchengladbach	2–0	Bayer Leverkusen	Mönchengladbach
18:30 CEST (UTC+2)	Hofmann 55' (pen.); Johnson 58'	Report		Stadium: Borussia-Park; Attendance: 53,087; Referee: Christian Dingert

1 September 2018 2	Bayer Leverkusen	1–3	VfL Wolfsburg	Leverkusen
15:30 CEST (UTC+2)	Bailey 24'	Report	Özcan 36' (o.g.); Weghorst 55'; Steffen 60'	Stadium: BayArena; Attendance: 26,247; Referee: Sven Jablonski

15 September 2018 3	Bayern Munich	3–1	Bayer Leverkusen	Munich
15:30 CEST (UTC+2)	Tolisso 10'; Robben 19'; Rodríguez 89'	Report	Wendell 5' (pen.)	Stadium: Allianz Arena; Attendance: 75,000; Referee: Tobias Welz

23 September 2018 4	Bayer Leverkusen	1–0	Mainz 05	Leverkusen
15:30 CEST (UTC+2)	Havertz 62'	Report		Stadium: BayArena; Attendance: 27,473; Referee: Marco Fritz

26 September 2018 5	Fortuna Düsseldorf	1–2	Bayer Leverkusen	Düsseldorf
18:30 CEST (UTC+2)	Hennings 90+4' (pen.)	Report	Volland 50', 60'	Stadium: Merkur Spiel-Arena; Attendance: 40,046; Referee: Manuel Gräfe

29 September 2018 6	Bayer Leverkusen	2–4	Borussia Dortmund	Leverkusen
18:30 CEST (UTC+2)	Weiser 9'; Tah 39'	Report	Bruun Larsen 65'; Reus 69'; Alcácer 85', 90+4'	Stadium: BayArena; Attendance: 30,210; Referee: Felix Brych

7 October 2018 7	SC Freiburg	0–0	Bayer Leverkusen	Freiburg
13:30 CEST (UTC+2)		Report		Stadium: Schwarzwald-Stadion; Attendance: 23,800; Referee: Bastian Dankert

20 October 2018 8	Bayer Leverkusen	2–2	Hannover 96	Leverkusen
15:30 CEST (UTC+2)	L. Bender 34'; Bellarabi 90+4'	Report	Muslija 25'; Felipe 54'	Stadium: BayArena; Attendance: 26,435; Referee: Patrick Ittrich

28 October 2018 9	Werder Bremen	2–6	Bayer Leverkusen	Bremen
18:00 CET (UTC+1)	Pizarro 60'; Osako 62'	Report	Volland 8'; Brandt 38'; Bellarabi 45'; Havertz 67', 77'; Dragović 72'	Stadium: Weser-Stadion; Attendance: 40,400; Referee: Marco Fritz

3 November 2018 10	Bayer Leverkusen	1–4	1899 Hoffenheim	Leverkusen
15:30 CET (UTC+1)	Bellarabi 30'	Report	Nelson 19'; Joelinton 34', 73'; Grifo 49' (pen.)	Stadium: BayArena; Attendance: 27,589; Referee: Tobias Stieler

11 November 2018 11	RB Leipzig	3–0	Bayer Leverkusen	Leipzig
15:30 CET (UTC+1)	Poulsen 27', 85'; Klostermann 68'	Report		Stadium: Red Bull Arena; Attendance: 36,155; Referee: Martin Petersen

23 November 2018 12	Bayer Leverkusen	2–0	VfB Stuttgart	Leverkusen
20:30 CET (UTC+1)	Volland 76', 83'	Report		Stadium: BayArena; Attendance: 24,632; Referee: Robert Schröder

3 December 2018 13	1. FC Nürnberg	1–1	Bayer Leverkusen	Nuremberg
20:30 CET (UTC+1)	Margreitter 57'	Report	Havertz 29'	Stadium: Max-Morlock-Stadion; Attendance: 32,238; Referee: Bibiana Steinhaus

8 December 2018 14	Bayer Leverkusen	1–0	FC Augsburg	Leverkusen
15:30 CET (UTC+1)	Alario 75'	Report		Stadium: BayArena; Attendance: 25,558; Referee: Bastian Dankert

16 December 2018 15	Eintracht Frankfurt	2–1	Bayer Leverkusen	Frankfurt
18:00 CET (UTC+1)	Da Costa 28'; Kostić 57'	Report	Bellarabi 65'	Stadium: Commerzbank-Arena; Attendance: 46,500; Referee: Felix Brych

19 December 2018 16	Schalke 04	1–2	Bayer Leverkusen	Gelsenkirchen
18:30 CET (UTC+1)	Wright 45+2'	Report	Dragović 26'; Alario 35'	Stadium: Veltins-Arena; Attendance: 61,548; Referee: Deniz Aytekin

22 December 2018 17	Bayer Leverkusen	3–1	Hertha BSC	Leverkusen
15:30 CET (UTC+1)	Volland 5'; Havertz 23', 49'	Report	Torunarigha 26'	Stadium: BayArena; Attendance: 27,647; Referee: Tobias Stieler

19 January 2019 18	Bayer Leverkusen	0–1	Borussia Mönchengladbach	Leverkusen
15:30 CET (UTC+1)		Report	Pléa 37'	Stadium: BayArena; Attendance: 29,628; Referee: Daniel Siebert

26 January 2019 19	VfL Wolfsburg	0–3	Bayer Leverkusen	Wolfsburg
15:30 CET (UTC+1)		Report	Havertz 45' (pen.); Volland 62'; Brandt 88'	Stadium: Volkswagen Arena; Attendance: 21,736; Referee: Felix Zwayer

2 February 2019 20	Bayer Leverkusen	3–1	Bayern Munich	Leverkusen
15:30 CET (UTC+1)	Bailey 53'; Volland 63'; Alario 87'	Report	Goretzka 41'	Stadium: BayArena; Attendance: 30,210; Referee: Tobias Stieler

8 February 2019 21	Mainz 05	1–5	Bayer Leverkusen	Mainz
20:30 CET (UTC+1)	Quaison 9'	Report	Wendell 5'; Havertz 19'; Brandt 30', 64'; Bellarabi 43'	Stadium: Opel Arena; Attendance: 21,905; Referee: Robert Schröder

17 February 2019 22	Bayer Leverkusen	2–0	Fortuna Düsseldorf	Leverkusen
18:00 CET (UTC+1)	Havertz 18'; Bailey 66'	Report		Stadium: BayArena; Attendance: 27,717; Referee: Markus Schmidt

24 February 2019 23	Borussia Dortmund	3–2	Bayer Leverkusen	Dortmund
18:00 CET (UTC+1)	Zagadou 30'; Sancho 38'; Götze 60'	Report	Volland 37'; Tah 75'	Stadium: Signal Iduna Park; Attendance: 81,029; Referee: Christian Dingert

2 March 2019 24	Bayer Leverkusen	2–0	SC Freiburg	Leverkusen
15:30 CET (UTC+1)	Aránguiz 4'; Bailey 73'	Report		Stadium: BayArena; Attendance: 26,607; Referee: Guido Winkmann

10 March 2019 25	Hannover 96	2–3	Bayer Leverkusen	Hanover
18:00 CET (UTC+1)	Jonathas 51'; Weiser 73' (o.g.)	Report	Volland 13', 28'; Havertz 87'	Stadium: HDI-Arena; Attendance: 33,800; Referee: Sören Storks

17 March 2019 26	Bayer Leverkusen	1–3	Werder Bremen	Leverkusen
13:30 CET (UTC+1)	Bailey 75'	Report	Kruse 13', 90+5'; Rashica 37'	Stadium: BayArena; Attendance: 30,210; Referee: Deniz Aytekin

29 March 2019 27	1899 Hoffenheim	4–1	Bayer Leverkusen	Sinsheim
20:30 CET (UTC+1)	Belfodil 10', 61'; S. Bender 51' (o.g.); Kramarić 79'	Report	Volland 17'	Stadium: PreZero Arena; Attendance: 28,350; Referee: Harm Osmers

6 April 2019 28	Bayer Leverkusen	2–4	RB Leipzig	Leverkusen
15:30 CEST (UTC+2)	Havertz 11' (pen.), 23'	Report	Sabitzer 17'; Werner 64'; Forsberg 71' (pen.); Cunha 83'	Stadium: BayArena; Attendance: 28,845; Referee: Tobias Welz

13 April 2019 29	VfB Stuttgart	0–1	Bayer Leverkusen	Stuttgart
15:30 CEST (UTC+2)		Report	Havertz 64' (pen.)	Stadium: Mercedes-Benz Arena; Attendance: 53,657; Referee: Tobias Stieler

20 April 2019 30	Bayer Leverkusen	2–0	1. FC Nürnberg	Leverkusen
15:30 CEST (UTC+2)	Alario 61'; Volland 86'	Report		Stadium: BayArena; Attendance: 26,405; Referee: Guido Winkmann

26 April 2019 31	FC Augsburg	1–4	Bayer Leverkusen	Augsburg
20:30 CEST (UTC+2)	Danso 12'	Report	Volland 15'; Havertz 48'; Tah 60'; Brandt 88'	Stadium: WWK Arena; Attendance: 26,404; Referee: Frank Willenborg

5 May 2019 32	Bayer Leverkusen	6–1	Eintracht Frankfurt	Leverkusen
18:00 CEST (UTC+2)	Havertz 2'; Brandt 13'; Alario 23', 34'; Aránguiz 28'; Hinteregger 36' (o.g.)	Report	Kostić 14'	Stadium: BayArena; Attendance: 30,210; Referee: Robert Hartmann

11 May 2019 33	Bayer Leverkusen	1–1	Schalke 04	Leverkusen
15:30 CEST (UTC+2)	Havertz 31'	Report	Burgstaller 47'	Stadium: BayArena; Attendance: 30,210; Referee: Deniz Aytekin

18 May 2019 34	Hertha BSC	1–5	Bayer Leverkusen	Berlin
15:30 CEST (UTC+2)	Lazaro 34'	Report	Havertz 28'; Alario 38', 72', 88'; Brandt 54'	Stadium: Olympiastadion Berlin; Attendance: 59,287; Referee: Marco Fritz

=== DFB-Pokal ===
18 August 2018 First round	1. CfR Pforzheim	0–1	Bayer Leverkusen	Pforzheim
15:30 CEST (UTC+2)		Report	Alario 27' (pen.)	Stadium: Stadion Holzhof; Attendance: 4,725; Referee: Frank Willenborg

31 October 2018 Second round	Borussia Mönchengladbach	0–5	Bayer Leverkusen	Mönchengladbach
20:45 CET (UTC+1)		Report	Brandt 5'; Jedvaj 45+1'; Bellarabi 67', 74'; Volland 80'	Stadium: Borussia-Park; Attendance: 48,755; Referee: Tobias Welz

5 February 2019 Round of 16	1. FC Heidenheim	2–1	Bayer Leverkusen	Heidenheim
18:30 CET (UTC+1)	Dovedan 47'; Multhaup 72'	Report	Brandt 44'	Stadium: Voith-Arena; Attendance: 11,400; Referee: Robert Hartmann

=== UEFA Europa League ===
==== Group stage ====
Pos	Team	Pld	W	D	L	GF	GA	GD	Pts	Qualification
1	(Germany) Bayer Leverkusen	6	4	1	1	16	9	+7	13	Advance to knockout phase
2	(Switzerland) Zürich	6	3	1	2	7	6	+1	10	Advance to knockout phase
3	(Cyprus) AEK Larnaca	6	1	2	3	6	12	−6	5	
4	(Bulgaria) Ludogorets Razgrad	6	0	4	2	5	7	−2	4	

Source: UEFA
Rules for classification: Group stage tiebreakers

20 September 2018 1	Ludogorets Razgrad (Bulgaria)	2–3	(Germany) Bayer Leverkusen	Razgrad, Bulgaria
22:00 EEST (UTC+3); 21:00 CEST (UTC+2)	Keșerü 8'; Marcelinho 31'	Report	Havertz 38', 69'; Kiese Thelin 63'	Stadium: Ludogorets Arena; Attendance: 8,240; Referee: Paolo Mazzoleni (Italy)

4 October 2018 2	Bayer Leverkusen (Germany)	4–2	(Cyprus) AEK Larnaca	Leverkusen, Germany
18:55 CEST (UTC+2)	Havertz 44'; Alario 49', 88'; Brandt 90+2'	Report	Trichkovski 25'; Raspas 90+1'	Stadium: BayArena; Attendance: 23,354; Referee: Ievgenii Aranovskyi (Ukraine)

25 October 2018 3	Zürich (Switzerland)	3–2	(Germany) Bayer Leverkusen	Zürich, Switzerland
18:55 CEST (UTC+2)	Marchesano 44'; Domgjoni 59'; Odey 78'	Report	Bellarabi 50', 54'	Stadium: Letzigrund; Attendance: 12,427; Referee: Aliyar Aghayev (Azerbaijan)

8 November 2018 4	Bayer Leverkusen (Germany)	1–0	(Switzerland) Zürich	Leverkusen, Germany
21:00 CET (UTC+1)	Jedvaj 60'	Report		Stadium: BayArena; Attendance: 16,179; Referee: Paweł Gil (Poland)

29 November 2018 5	Bayer Leverkusen (Germany)	1–1	(Bulgaria) Ludogorets Razgrad	Leverkusen, Germany
18:55 CET (UTC+1)	Weiser 85'	Report	Marcelinho 69'	Stadium: BayArena; Attendance: 16,066; Referee: Dennis Higler (Netherlands)

13 December 2018 6	AEK Larnaca (Cyprus)	1–5	(Germany) Bayer Leverkusen	Nicosia, Cyprus
22:00 EET (UTC+2); 21:00 CET (UTC+1)	Català 26'	Report	Kohr 28', 68'; Alario 41' (pen.), 86'; Paulinho 78'	Stadium: GSP Stadium; Attendance: 1,584; Referee: François Letexier (France)

==== Knockout phase ====
===== Round of 32 =====
14 February 2019 First leg	Krasnodar (Russia)	0–0	(Germany) Bayer Leverkusen	Krasnodar, Russia
20:55 MSK (UTC+3); 18:55 CET (UTC+1)		Report		Stadium: Krasnodar Stadium; Attendance: 34,827; Referee: Davide Massa (Italy)

21 February 2019 Second leg	Bayer Leverkusen (Germany)	1–1 (1–1a agg.)	(Russia) Krasnodar	Leverkusen, Germany
21:00 CET (UTC+1)	Aránguiz 87'	Report	Suleymanov 84'	Stadium: BayArena; Attendance: 16,084; Referee: Gediminas Mažeika (Lithuania)

== Statistics ==
=== Appearances and goals ===
No.	Pos	Nat	Player	Total		Bundesliga		DFB-Pokal		Europa League	
No.	Pos	Nat	Player	Apps	Goals	Apps	Goals	Apps	Goals	Apps	Goals
Goalkeepers
1	GK	(Finland) FIN	Lukáš Hrádecký	40	0	32	0	2	0	6	0
24	GK	(Germany) GER	Thorsten Kirschbaum	1	0	0	0	0	0	1	0
28	GK	(Austria) AUT	Ramazan Özcan	4	0	2	0	1	0	1	0
Defenders
3	DF	(Greece) GRE	Panagiotis Retsos	1	0	0	0	0	0	1	0
4	DF	(Germany) GER	Jonathan Tah	38	3	33	3	2	0	3	0
6	DF	(Austria) AUT	Aleksandar Dragović	29	2	14+5	2	2	0	7+1	0
16	DF	(Croatia) CRO	Tin Jedvaj	21	2	13+3	0	1+1	1	2+1	1
18	DF	(Brazil) BRA	Wendell	39	2	25+3	2	3	0	8	0
23	DF	(Germany) GER	Mitchell Weiser	41	2	22+8	1	3	0	7+1	1
Midfielders
5	MF	(Germany) GER	Sven Bender	32	0	25+2	0	2	0	3	0
8	MF	(Germany) GER	Lars Bender	27	1	18+2	1	2	0	3+2	0
15	MF	(Austria) AUT	Julian Baumgartlinger	27	0	16+5	0	2	0	2+2	0
20	MF	(Chile) CHI	Charles Aránguiz	29	3	22+2	2	1	0	4	1
21	MF	(Germany) GER	Dominik Kohr	25	2	10+8	0	0+2	0	5	2
29	MF	(Germany) GER	Kai Havertz	42	20	33+1	17	2	0	5+1	3
30	MF	(Germany) GER	Sam Schreck	2	0	0	0	0	0	2	0
36	MF	(Germany) GER	Adrian Stanilewicz	1	0	0	0	0	0	0+1	0
38	MF	(Germany) GER	Karim Bellarabi	24	9	14+5	5	1+1	2	3	2
Forwards
7	FW	(Brazil) BRA	Paulinho	21	1	0+15	0	1+1	0	3+1	1
9	FW	(Jamaica) JAM	Leon Bailey	39	5	21+8	5	1+1	0	6+2	0
10	FW	(Germany) GER	Julian Brandt	43	10	30+3	7	3	2	5+2	1
11	FW	(Sweden) SWE	Isaac Kiese Thelin	14	1	1+5	0	0+2	0	4+2	1
13	FW	(Argentina) ARG	Lucas Alario	36	14	11+16	9	2	1	4+3	4
17	FW	(Finland) FIN	Joel Pohjanpalo	0	0	0	0	0	0	0	0
31	FW	(Germany) GER	Kevin Volland	42	15	32+2	14	2+1	1	3+2	0
Players transferred out during the season
22	MF	(Ukraine) UKR	Vladlen Yurchenko	0	0	0	0	0	0	0	0
32	MF	(Poland) POL	Jakub Bednarczyk	1	0	0	0	0	0	0+1	0

Last updated: 18 May 2019
Source: Competitions
