= Mitchell Weiser =

German footballer (born 1994)

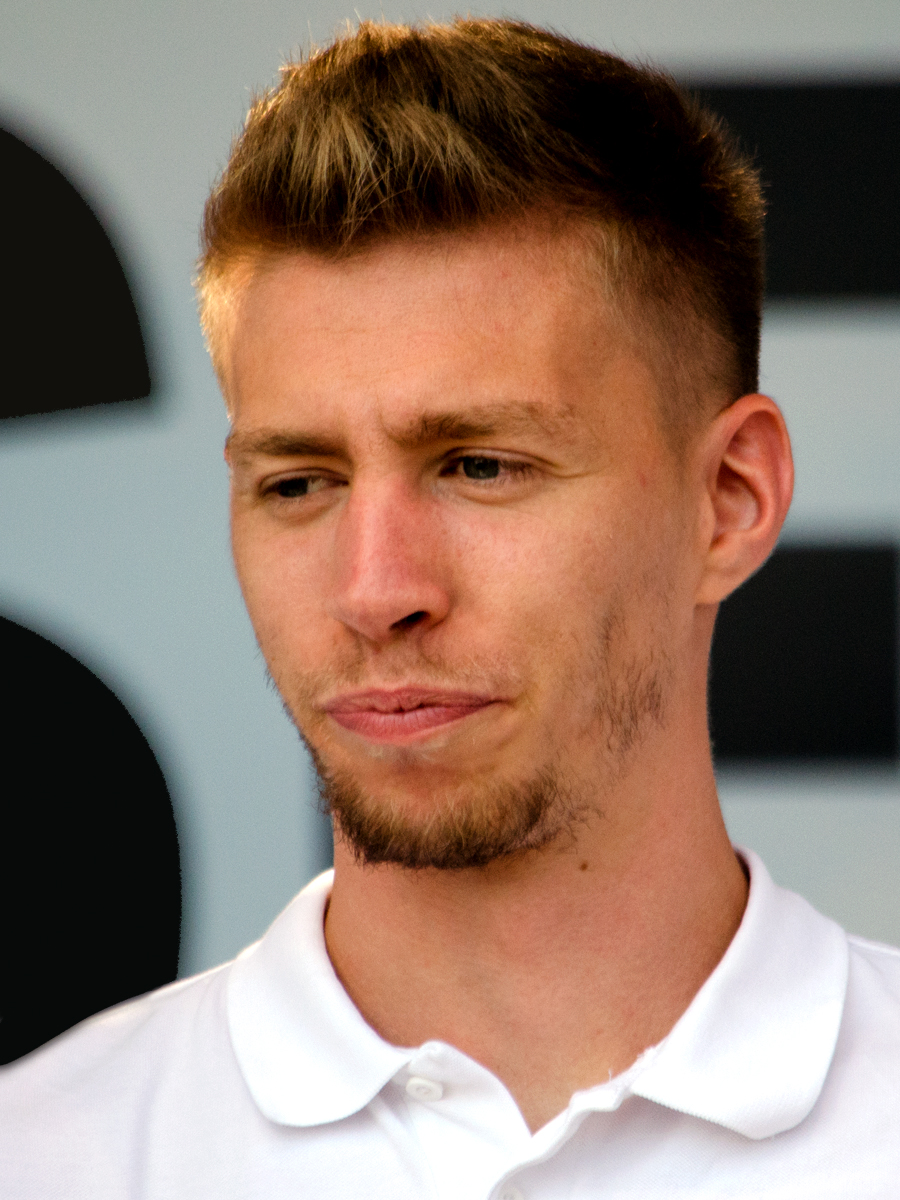
- Weiser in 2018

Personal information
- Full name: Mitchell-Elijah Weiser
- Date of birth: 21 April 1994 (age 32)
- Place of birth: Troisdorf, Germany
- Height: 1.77 m (5 ft 10 in)
- Positions: Right-back; right wing-back

Team information
- Current team: Werder Bremen
- Number: 8

Youth career
- 2000–2005: TV Eintracht Veltenhof
- 2005–2011: 1. FC Köln

Senior career*
Years	Team	Apps	(Gls)
2011–2012	1. FC Köln II	2	(0)
2011–2012	1. FC Köln	1	(0)
2012–2014	Bayern Munich II	35	(3)
2013–2015	Bayern Munich	16	(1)
2013	→ 1. FC Kaiserslautern (loan)	13	(2)
2015–2018	Hertha BSC	70	(5)
2018–2022	Bayer Leverkusen	53	(3)
2021–2022	→ Werder Bremen (loan)	24	(2)
2022–	Werder Bremen	97	(10)

International career
2010	Germany U16	3	(0)
2010–2011	Germany U17	22	(4)
2012	Germany U18	1	(0)
2013–2014	Germany U20	5	(0)
2015–2017	Germany U21	12	(1)
Medal record
Representing Germany
UEFA European Under-21 Championship
Winner	2017
European Under-17 Championship
Runner-up	2011
- * Club domestic league appearances and goals as of 17:30, 31 October 2026 (UTC)

Mitchell-Elijah Weiser (German pronunciation: [ˈmɪtʃl̩ ˈvaɪzɐ]; born 21 April 1994) is a professional footballer who plays as a right-back or right wing-back for Bundesliga club Werder Bremen.

== Club career ==
=== Early career ===
The son of former German footballer Patrick Weiser, Weiser spent his early childhood in Braunschweig, where he played for the youth teams of amateur club TV Eintracht Veltenhof.

=== 1. FC Köln ===
Weiser started his career in the youth department of 1. FC Köln in the 2005–06 season. He won his first cup with the U-17 team in 2011.

He made his debut in the Bundesliga on 25 February 2012 in a game against Bayer Leverkusen as the youngest player for the club. This is his only appearance for the first team before transferring to Bayern.

=== Bayern Munich ===
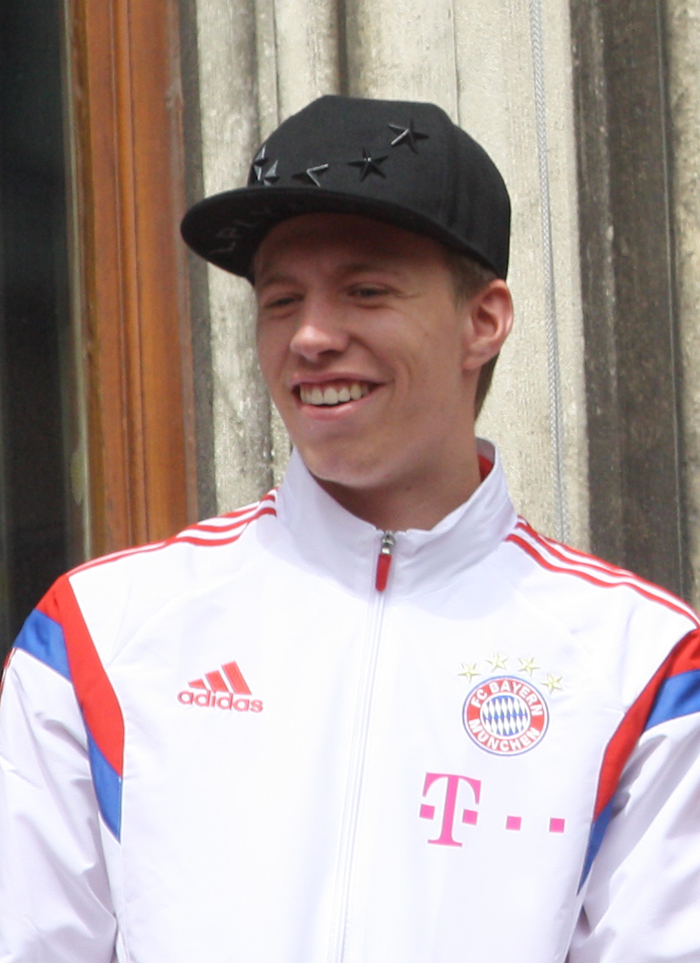
Weiser with Bayern Munich in 2014

On 1 June 2012, Weiser moved to Bayern Munich, signing a contract until 2015. On 2 January 2013, he was loaned out to 2. Bundesliga team 1. FC Kaiserslautern until the end of the season.

On his return for Bayern in the 2013–14 season, Weiser scored his first goal for the Bavarians against São Paulo on the 2013 Audi Cup.

On 5 November 2013, he made his UEFA Champions League debut with Bayern Munich in a 1–0 group stage win away to Viktoria Plzeň, coming on as a substitute for Mario Götze in the 87th minute.

On 5 April 2014, he made his first Bundesliga appearance for Bayern. With the championship already won, Weiser was selected in the starting line-up as Bayern lost 1–0 to FC Augsburg, their first loss in a league match since October 2012 to end a record 53-match unbeaten run.

On 21 February 2015, in a 6–0 win against SC Paderborn 07, Weiser scored his first Bundesliga goal in the 78th minute.

=== Hertha BSC ===
Weiser signed a three–year contract for Hertha BSC on 17 June 2015. He missed the start of the 2015–16 season after an MRI revealed a "teaser and a sprain of the medial collateral ligament." He debuted for Hertha in a 1–1 draw on matchday two against Werder Bremen. He finished the 2015–16 season with two goals in 33 appearances. Weiser extended his stay at the Olympiastadion until 2020 on 26 August 2016. He scored the first goal in a 2–0 win against Schalke on 18 September 2016. He finished the 2016–17 season four goals in 21 appearances. He finished the 2017–18 season with two goals in 31 appearances.

=== Bayer Leverkusen ===
In May 2018, Bayer Leverkusen announced that they have signed Weiser from Hertha on a five-year contract until 2023. On 29 November, he scored his first goal in European competitions in a 1–1 draw against Ludogorets Razgrad in the 2018–19 UEFA Europa League.

=== Werder Bremen ===
Weiser joined 2. Bundesliga club Werder Bremen on a season-long loan on 31 August 2021, the last day of the 2021 summer transfer window. He scored on his starting debut on 11 September, scoring the second goal in a 3–0 win against FC Ingolstadt. He signed with Werder Bremen on a permanent basis in July 2022, departing Leverkusen.

On 21 January 2024, he scored the only goal in a 1–0 away victory over his former club Bayern Munich, to be Werder Bremen's first win at the Allianz Arena since 2008.

== International career ==
Weiser (standing, second from left) with Germany under-21 in 2017

On 10 January 2010, Weiser debuted in the U-16 Germany national team in a 6–0 against Cyprus. He scored his first goal for the U-17 team on 4 September 2010 in a 2–0 against Azerbaijan.

His first international tournament was the 2011 UEFA European U-17 Football Championship in Serbia where the team reached the final against the Netherlands, losing 2–5.

The 2011 FIFA U-17 World Cup in Mexico was his next tournament with the team reaching third place and Weiser ending the tournament with three goals in six matches. His good performance has caught attention of scouts around the world. His playing style and ability have drawn comparisons to Dani Alves.

Weiser scored the only goal with a header for Germany under-21 team against Spain under-21 team in the 2017 UEFA European Under-21 Championship Final helping the team to clinch their second overall UEFA European Under-21 Championship title.

In October 2024, he completed his switch from the German federation to the Algerian federation. He thus became eligible to play for Algeria with immediate effect.

== Personal life ==
Weiser is of Algerian descent on his mother's side which made him eligible to opt for the Algeria national team.

== Career statistics ==
As of match played 31 October 2026

Appearances and goals by club, season and competition
Club	Season	League			DFB-Pokal		Continental		Other		Total	
Club	Season	League	Apps	Goals	Apps	Goals	Apps	Goals	Apps	Goals	Apps	Goals
1. FC Köln II	2011–12	Regionalliga West	2	0	—		—		—		2	0
1. FC Köln	2011–12	Bundesliga	1	0	0	0	—		—		1	0
Bayern Munich	2012–13	Bundesliga	0	0	0	0	0	0	0	0	0	0
Bayern Munich	2013–14	Bundesliga	3	0	1	0	1 (Note: Appearance(s) in UEFA Champions League)	0	0	0	5	0
Bayern Munich	2014–15	Bundesliga	13	1	1	0	2	0	0	0	16	1
Bayern Munich	Total		16	1	2	0	3	0	0	0	21	1
Bayern Munich II	2012–13	Regionalliga Bayern	9	1	—		—		—		9	1
Bayern Munich II	2013–14	Regionalliga Bayern	19	3	—		—		—		19	3
Bayern Munich II	2014–15	Regionalliga Bayern	7	0	—		—		—		7	0
Bayern Munich II	Total		35	4	—		—		—		35	4
1. FC Kaiserslautern (loan)	2012–13	2. Bundesliga	13	2	0	0	—		2 (Note: Appearances in Bundesliga relegation play-offs)	0	15	2
Hertha BSC	2015–16	Bundesliga	29	2	4	0	—		—		33	2
Hertha BSC	2016–17	Bundesliga	17	2	2	2	2 (Note: Appearances in UEFA Europa League)	0	—		21	4
Hertha BSC	2017–18	Bundesliga	24	1	2	1	5	0	—		31	2
Hertha BSC	Total		70	5	8	3	7	0	—		85	8
Bayer Leverkusen	2018–19	Bundesliga	30	1	3	0	8	1	—		41	2
Bayer Leverkusen	2019–20	Bundesliga	18	1	5	0	5 (Note: Three appearances in UEFA Champions League, two appearances in UEFA Europa League)	0	—		28	1
Bayer Leverkusen	2020–21	Bundesliga	5	1	0	0	0	0	—		5	1
Bayer Leverkusen	2021–22	Bundesliga	0	0	1	0	0	0	—		1	0
Bayer Leverkusen	Total		53	3	9	0	13	1	—		75	4
Werder Bremen (loan)	2021–22	2. Bundesliga	24	2	0	0	—		—		24	2
Werder Bremen	2022–23	Bundesliga	30	2	2	2	—		—		32	4
Werder Bremen	2023–24	Bundesliga	30	3	1	0	—		—		31	3
Werder Bremen	2024–25	Bundesliga	31	4	4	0	—		—		35	4
Werder Bremen	2026–27	Bundesliga	6	1	1	0	—		—		7	1
Werder Bremen	Total		97	10	8	2	—		—		105	12
Career total			311	27	27	5	23	1	2	0	363	33

== Honours ==
Bayern Munich II

- Regionalliga Bayern: 2013–14

Bayern Munich

- Bundesliga: 2013–14, 2014–15
- DFB-Pokal: 2013–14
- DFL-Supercup: 2012
- FIFA Club World Cup: 2013

Germany

- UEFA European Under-21 Championship: 2017
