= 2017 UEFA European Under-21 Championship final =

2017 UEFA European Under-21 Championship Final
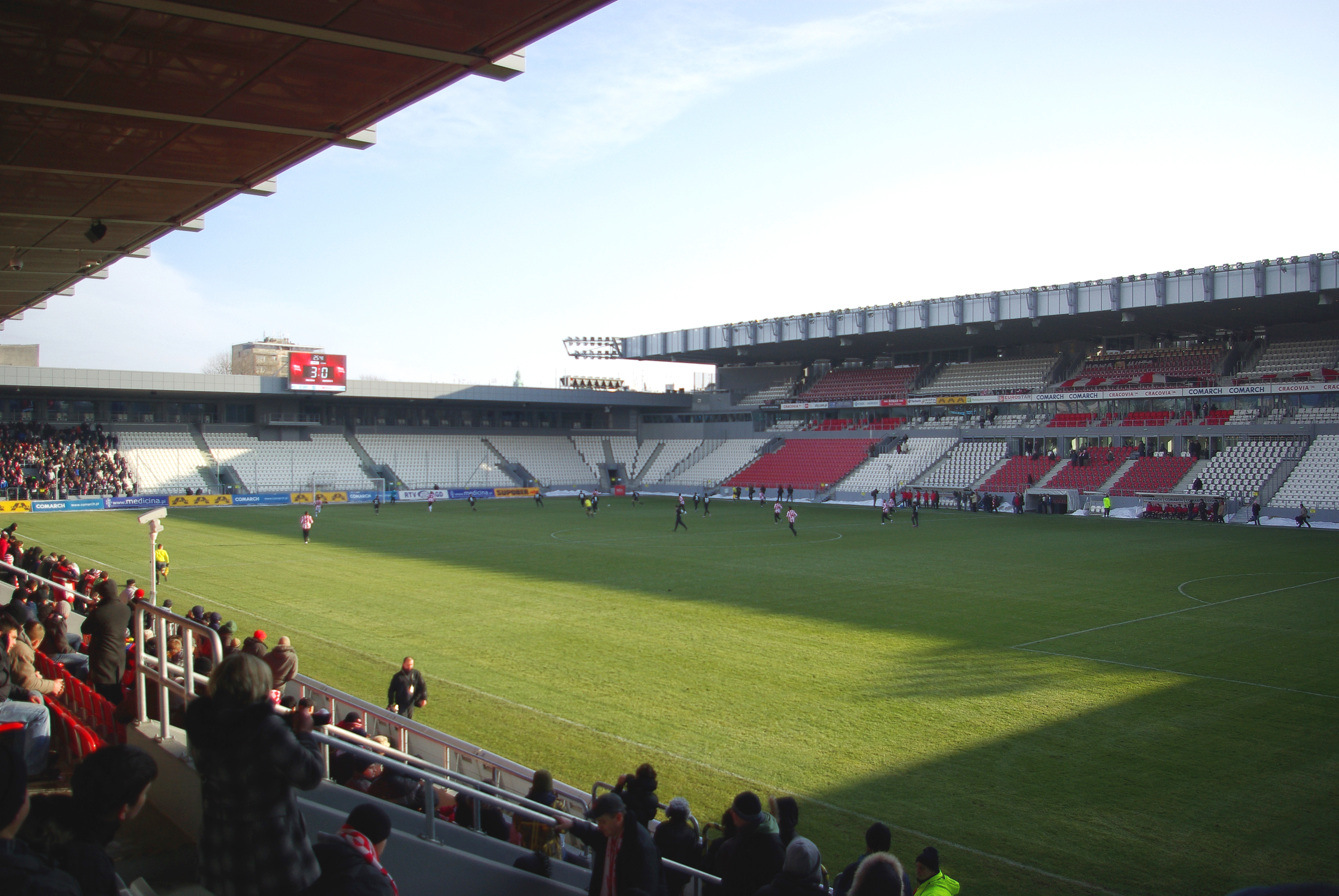
- The Stadion Cracovia in Kraków hosted the final.
- Event: 2017 UEFA European Under-21 Championship
Germany	Spain
(Germany)	(Spain)
1	0
- Date: 30 June 2017
- Venue: Stadion Cracovia, Kraków
- Man of the Match: Mitchell Weiser (Germany)
- Referee: Benoît Bastien (France)
- Attendance: 14,059
- Weather: Partly cloudy 24 °C (75 °F); 46% humidity

The 2017 UEFA European Under-21 Championship Final was a football match that took place on 30 June 2017 at the Stadion Cracovia in Kraków, Poland, to determine the winners of the 2017 UEFA European Under-21 Championship. The match was contested by Germany and Spain, the winners of the semi-finals.

Germany won the final 1–0 for their second UEFA European Under-21 Championship title.

== Route to the final ==
Germany
Round
Spain
Opponents
Result
Group stage
Opponents
Result
Czech Republic
2–0
Match 1
Macedonia
5–0
Denmark
3–0
Match 2
Portugal
3–1
Italy
0–1
Match 3
Serbia
1–0
Group C runners-up

Pos	Team	Pld	Pts
1	Italy	3	6
2	Germany	3	6
3	Denmark	3	3
4	Czech Republic	3	3

Source: UEFA
Final standings
Group B winners

Pos	Team	Pld	Pts
1	Spain	3	9
2	Portugal	3	6
3	Serbia	3	1
4	Macedonia	3	1

Source: UEFA
Opponents
Result
Knockout stage
Opponents
Result
England
2–2 (a.e.t.) (4–3 p)
Semi-finals
Italy
3–1

== Match ==
=== Details ===
30 June 2017
20:45 CEST

Germany	1–0	Spain
Weiser 40'	Report

Stadion Cracovia, Kraków
Attendance: 14,059
Referee: Benoît Bastien (France)

Germany	Spain

GK	12	Julian Pollersbeck
RB	2	Jeremy Toljan
CB	5	Niklas Stark	(yellow card) 52'
CB	15	Marc-Oliver Kempf
LB	3	Yannick Gerhardt
DM	19	Janik Haberer	(yellow card) 50'	(substituted off) 82'
RM	17	Mitchell Weiser
CM	7	Max Meyer	(yellow card) 78'
CM	10	Maximilian Arnold (c)	(yellow card) 47'
LM	11	Serge Gnabry		(substituted off) 81'
CF	22	Maximilian Philipp		(substituted off) 87'
Substitutions:
MF	18	Nadiem Amiri		(substituted on) 81'
MF	21	Dominik Kohr		(substituted on) 82'
MF	20	Levin Öztunalı		(substituted on) 87'
Manager:
Stefan Kuntz

GK	1	Kepa Arrizabalaga
RB	2	Héctor Bellerín
CB	4	Jorge Meré
CB	5	Jesús Vallejo	(yellow card) 89'
LB	19	Jonny		(substituted off) 51'
CM	8	Saúl	(yellow card) 43'
CM	22	Marcos Llorente	(yellow card) 54'	(substituted off) 83'
CM	6	Dani Ceballos
RF	11	Marco Asensio
CF	12	Sandro		(substituted off) 71'
LF	7	Gerard Deulofeu (c)
Substitutions:
DF	3	José Gayà		(substituted on) 51'
FW	15	Iñaki Williams		(substituted on) 71'
FW	9	Borja Mayoral		(substituted on) 83'
Manager:
Albert Celades

Man of the Match:
Mitchell Weiser (Germany)

Assistant referees:
Frédéric Haquette (France)
Hicham Zakrani (France)
Fourth official:
Ivan Kružliak (Slovakia)
Additional assistant referees:
Benoît Millot (France)
Jérôme Miguelgorry (France)

Match rules

- 90 minutes.
- 30 minutes of extra time if necessary.
- Penalty shoot-out if scores still level.
- Maximum of three substitutions, with a fourth allowed in extra time.

=== Statistics ===
Overall
Statistic	Germany	Spain
Goals scored	1	0
Total shots	18	13
Shots on target	4	1
Saves	1	3
Ball possession	41%	59%
Corner kicks	4	12
Fouls committed	16	12
Offsides	1	1
Yellow cards	4	3
Red cards	0	0
