= Kai Havertz =

German footballer (born 1999)

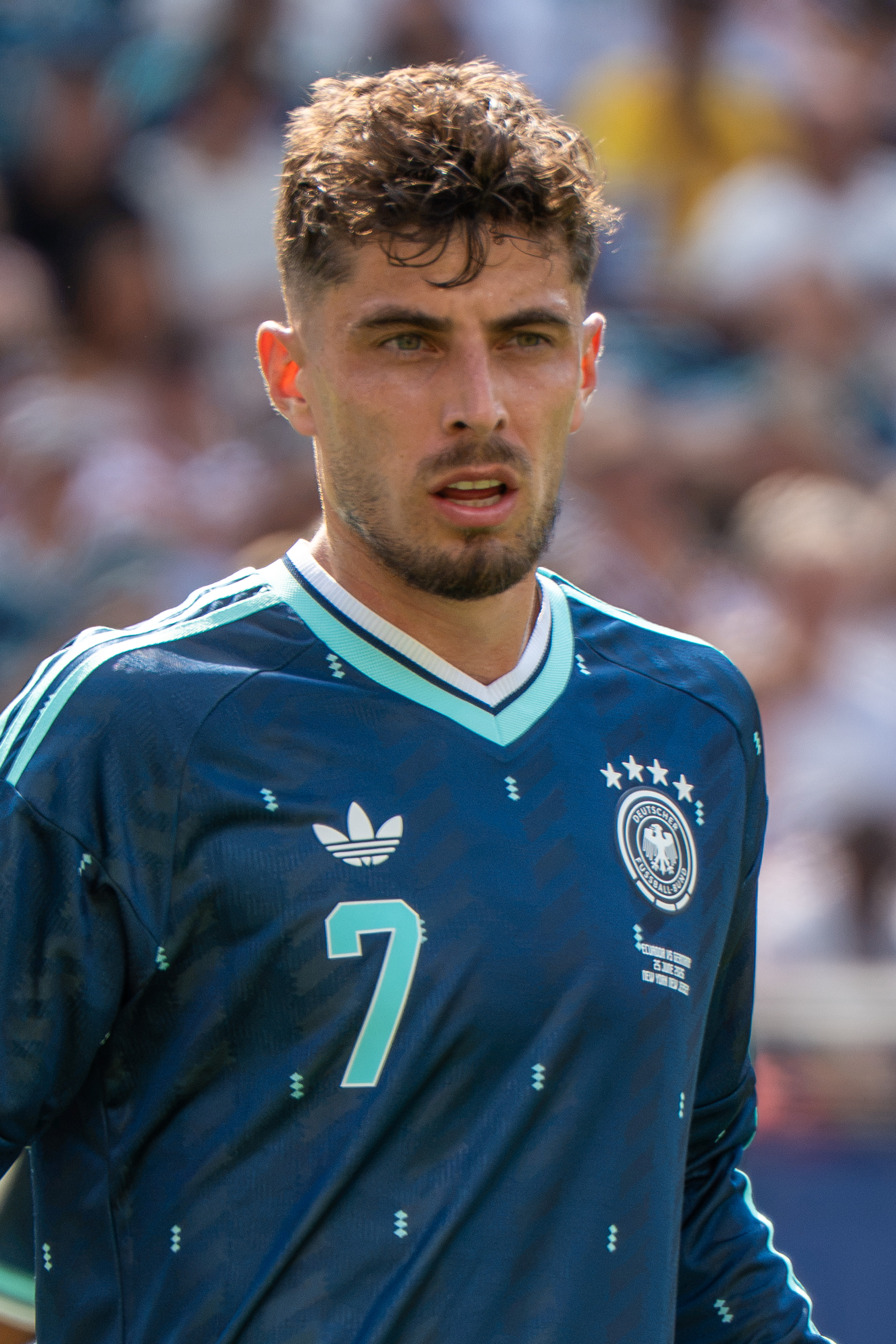
- Havertz with Germany in 2026

Personal information
- Full name: Kai Lukas Havertz
- Date of birth: 11 June 1999 (age 27)
- Place of birth: Aachen, Germany
- Height: 1.93 m (6 ft 4 in)
- Positions: Attacking midfielder; forward

Team information
- Current team: Arsenal
- Number: 29

Youth career
- 2003–2009: Alemannia Mariadorf
- 2009–2010: Alemannia Aachen
- 2010–2016: Bayer Leverkusen

Senior career*
Years	Team	Apps	(Gls)
2016–2020	Bayer Leverkusen	118	(36)
2020–2023	Chelsea	91	(19)
2023–	Arsenal	83	(27)

International career^{‡}
2014–2015	Germany U16	6	(0)
2015–2016	Germany U17	16	(2)
2017–2018	Germany U19	8	(7)
2018–	Germany	65	(25)
- * Club domestic league appearances and goals as of 19:40, 21 November 2026 (UTC) ‡ National team caps and goals as of 21:47, 16 November 2026 (UTC)

Kai Lukas Havertz (German pronunciation: [kaɪ̯ ˈhaːvɛʁts]; born 11 June 1999) is a German professional footballer who plays as a forward or attacking midfielder for Premier League club Arsenal and the Germany national team.

Having graduated from Bayer Leverkusen's youth academy in 2016, Havertz made his senior debut with the club in the same year. Upon his debut, he became the club's youngest-ever debutant in the Bundesliga, and then their youngest-ever scorer when he got his first goal the following year. Havertz holds the record for being the youngest player to reach 50 and 100 league appearances in the German top flight.

Havertz's performances sparked the interest of several European clubs, with Chelsea signing him in 2020 for a transfer worth €73.4 million (£62 million), making him Chelsea's second-most expensive signing at the time. With Chelsea, Havertz won the 2020–21 UEFA Champions League, 2021 UEFA Super Cup, and the 2021 FIFA Club World Cup, scoring the winning goals in the Champions League and Club World Cup finals. In June 2023, he joined fellow London side Arsenal for a reported fee of £65 million, with whom he won the Premier League and reached the final of the Champions League in 2026, in which he scored again. In September 2026, he became the highest scoring German in Premier League history.

After appearing for Germany at various youth levels, Havertz made his senior international debut in September 2018, becoming the first player born in 1999 to represent the national team. He represented Germany at two editions of the UEFA European Championship (2020 and 2024) and two FIFA World Cups (2022 and 2026), scoring multiple goals in every edition.

== Early life ==
Kai Lukas Havertz was born on 11 June 1999 in Aachen, North Rhine-Westphalia. His father, Ralf, is a policeman and is of Dutch descent through his mother. His mother, Anne, is a lawyer; her father, Richard Weidenhaupt-Pelzer, played professional football.

He grew up in Mariadorf, a district of Alsdorf. Later, the family moved to Aachen. As a child, Havertz was a fan of Toni Kroos, his future teammate from the Germany national team, and took inspiration from former players Ronaldinho, Andres Iniesta, Zinedine Zidane, and Ricardo Kaká.

== Club career ==
=== Youth career ===
Havertz received his first experience in football at the age of four when he joined amateur club Alemannia Mariadorf, where his grandfather, Richard, was chairman of the club. In 2009, he was signed by 2. Bundesliga club Alemannia Aachen where he spent only a year in the club's academy before joining Bayer Leverkusen at the age of 11. In the years that followed, he had to overcome the challenges associated with growth spurts and in 2016, after scoring 18 goals for the club's U-17 team, he was awarded the silver U-17 Fritz Walter Medal before breaking into Leverkusen's senior team the following year.

=== Bayer Leverkusen ===
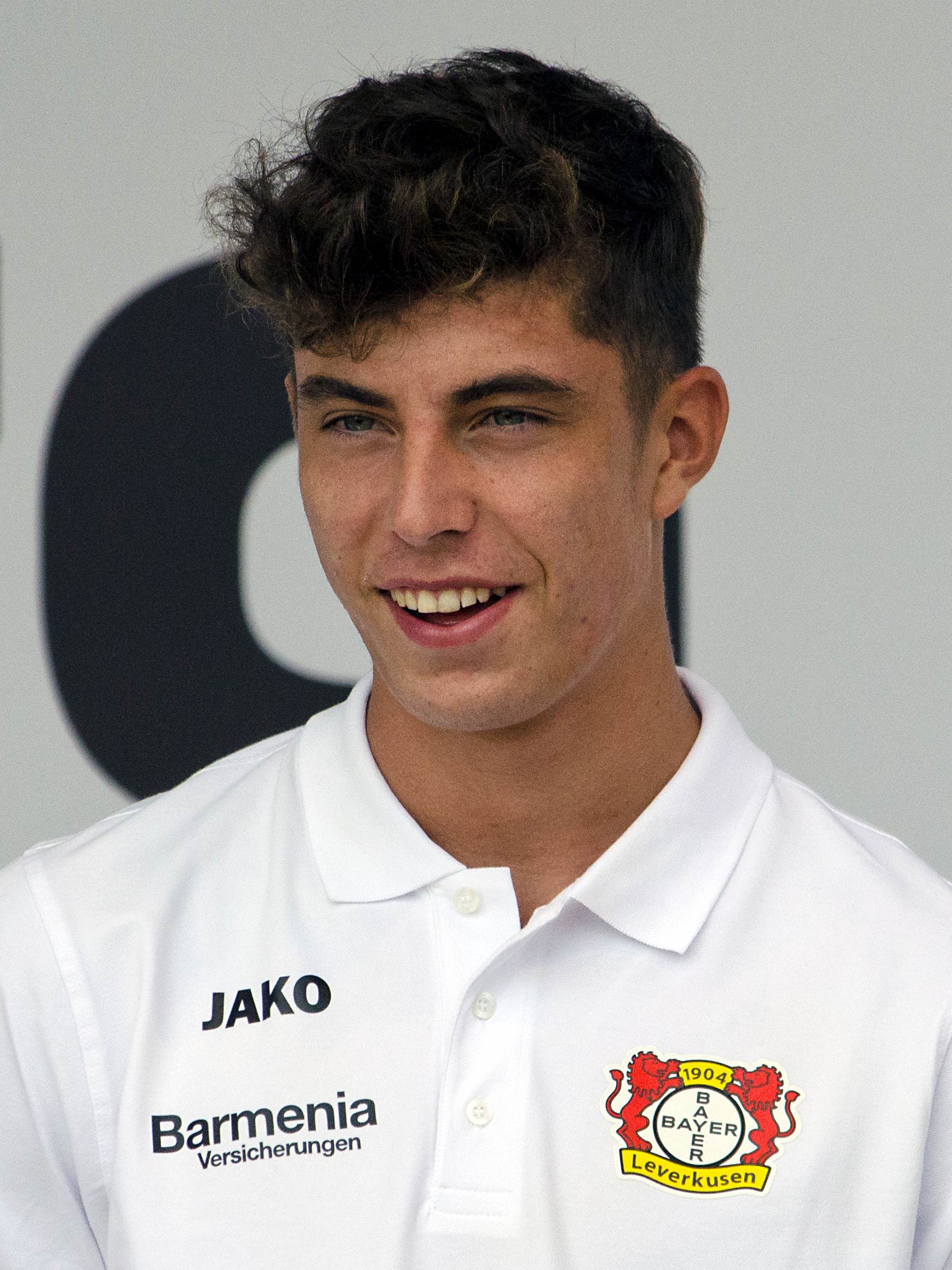
Havertz with Bayer Leverkusen in 2018

Havertz made his debut for Bayer Leverkusen on 15 October 2016, coming on as a second-half substitute for Charles Aránguiz in a 2–1 Bundesliga loss to Werder Bremen. Upon entering the field of play, he became the club's youngest-ever Bundesliga debutant, at the age of 17 years and 126 days, although his record was broken (by 111 days) by Florian Wirtz in 2020. On 17 February 2017, he assisted teammate Karim Bellarabi to score the 50,000th Bundesliga goal. Four days later, following the suspension of teammate Hakan Çalhanoğlu, he was handed his first Champions League start in the first leg of a round of 16 loss to Atlético Madrid. He was ruled out of the return leg of the fixture in March, however, as the match clashed with the examinations period at his school. He scored his first goal for the club on 2 April, netting a late equaliser in a 3–3 draw with VfL Wolfsburg. Upon doing so, Havertz broke another club record to become Leverkusen's youngest-ever goalscorer in the Bundesliga, at the age of 17. He ultimately made 28 appearances across all competitions and scored four goals, including a brace against Hertha BSC on the final day of the season, as Leverkusen ended the campaign in 12th position.

On 14 April 2018, Havertz became the youngest player in the history of the Bundesliga to reach 50 appearances at 18 years and 307 days old, breaking the record previously held by Timo Werner, who also later joined Havertz in the summer of 2020. He went on to end his second full campaign with the club with 30 league appearances and three goals to his name as Leverkusen ended the season in fifth place.

Havertz continued to impress during the following season, despite Leverkusen initially struggling in the league, and by the mid-way point of the campaign was the only player to have started every match for the club, scoring six goals along the way. On 20 September 2018, Havertz scored his first two goals in European competitions in a 3–2 win against Ludogorets Razgrad in the 2018–19 UEFA Europa League. On 26 January 2019, he became Leverkusen's youngest-ever penalty scorer when he scored from the spot in a 3–0 league win over Wolfsburg, aged 19 years, seven months and 16 days. The following month, he became the second youngest-ever player to achieve 75 Bundesliga appearances, behind Julian Draxler, when he started and scored in a 2–0 win over Fortuna Düsseldorf. On 13 April, he scored on his 100th appearance for Leverkusen to help the club to a 1–0 league win over VfB Stuttgart. The goal, his 13th for the campaign, also saw him become the youngest player since Stuttgart's own Horst Köppel in 1967–68 to score 13 goals in a single league season. On 5 May, he scored his 15th goal of the campaign during a 6–1 win over Eintracht Frankfurt; a match which for the first time ever saw seven goals scored in the first half of a Bundesliga match. On the final day of the season, he became the highest scoring teenager in a single Bundesliga campaign when he scored his 17th goal during a 5–1 win over Hertha BSC. At the end of the season, he was named runner-up to Marco Reus for the German Footballer of the Year award, losing out by just 37 votes.

On the opening day of the 2019–20 campaign, Havertz scored in Leverkusen's 3–2 win over Paderborn, becoming the second-youngest player of all time behind Köppel to score 25 Bundesliga goals. In December, at the age of 20 years, six months and four days, he broke another of Werner's records to become the youngest-ever player to reach 100 Bundesliga appearances when he started in his team's 2–0 defeat to Köln. In the 2019–20 UEFA Europa League, Havertz scored in both matches against Porto in the round of 32, then he scored a goal in a 2–1 defeat to Inter Milan in the quarter-final.

=== Chelsea ===
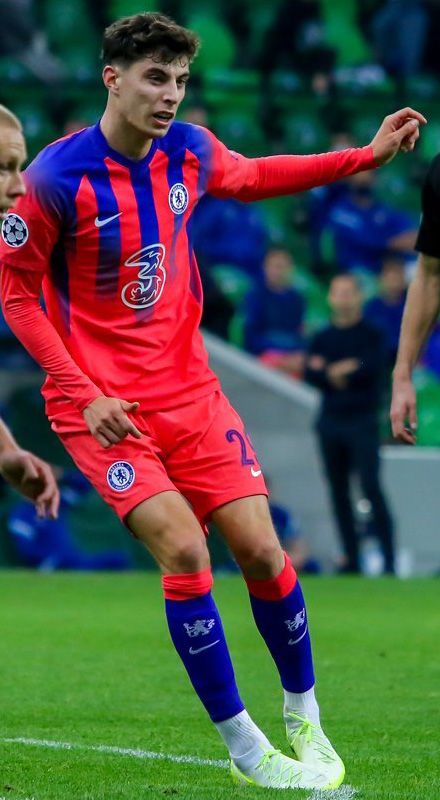
Havertz playing for Chelsea in 2020

On 4 September 2020, Havertz signed a five-year contract with Premier League club Chelsea. The transfer fee was reported to be worth an initial £62 million, which could rise to £71 million with add-ons, making him Chelsea's second-most expensive signing after Kepa Arrizabalaga. On 14 September, he made his Chelsea debut in the league opener against Brighton & Hove Albion, which ended in a 3–1 away win. On 23 September, Havertz scored his first career hat-trick and his first Chelsea goals in a 6–0 home win over Barnsley in the third round of the EFL Cup. Havertz scored his first-ever Premier League goal against Southampton on 17 October, in a 3–3 draw at home. On 4 November 2020, it was revealed that Havertz had tested positive for COVID-19.

On 29 May 2021, he scored the only goal of the game in the 2021 UEFA Champions League final. It was his first-ever goal in the competition as Chelsea beat fellow English club Manchester City to win the title for the second time in club history. Later that year, on 11 August, Havertz won the UEFA Super Cup with Chelsea, beating Villarreal in the final on penalties, despite him missing his penalty. On 28 August, he scored his first goal of the 2021–22 season in a 1–1 draw at Liverpool.

On 12 February 2022, Havertz scored the winning goal in the 117th minute of the FIFA Club World Cup Final from a penalty kick, which ended in a 2–1 victory over Palmeiras. Afterwards that year, on 3 September, he scored the winner in a 2–1 home victory against West Ham United for his first goal of the 2022–23 season. On 25 October, he scored the winner in a 2–1 away victory against Red Bull Salzburg, which qualified his club for the knockout phase. On 7 March 2023, he scored the winning goal against Borussia Dortmund to help Chelsea reach the quarter-finals of the 2022–23 UEFA Champions League.

=== Arsenal ===
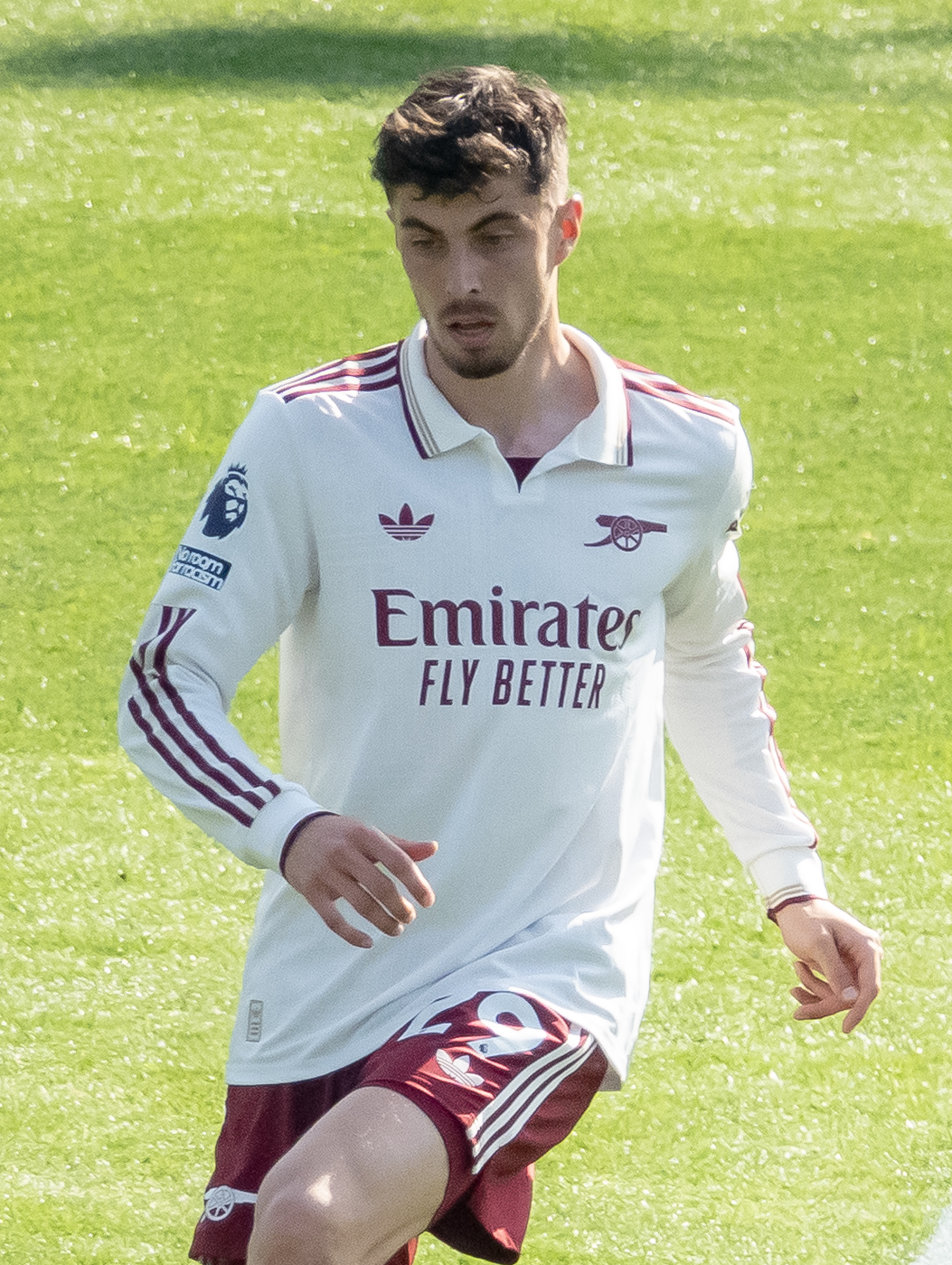
Havertz playing for Arsenal in 2026

On 28 June 2023, Havertz joined fellow London club Arsenal for a reported fee of £65 million. He made his debut on 13 July in a 1–1 pre-season draw with 1. FC Nürnberg. Six days later, Havertz scored Arsenal's fifth in a 5–0 victory in the 2023 MLS All-Star Game. On 6 August, he made his competitive debut for the club against Manchester City in the 2023 Community Shield, which Arsenal won 4–1 on penalties. On 30 September, Havertz scored his first goal for Arsenal, a penalty in a 4–0 victory over Bournemouth. On 25 November, he scored his first open-play goal for the club by scoring the winning goal in a 1–0 win over Brentford. Four days later, Havertz netted his first Champions League goal for the club in a 6–0 rout of Lens.

On 24 February 2024, Havertz contributed his first double goal contribution for the club by scoring and assisting in a 4–1 victory over Newcastle United. On 9 March, he netted the winning goal in a 2–1 win over Brentford, becoming the first German to score in four consecutive games in Premier League history. On the final matchday of the 2023–24 season, he scored the winning goal in a 2–1 victory over Everton, as his club finished second in the league. He concluded his first season at Arsenal under coach Mikel Arteta with a personal best in the Premier League of 20 goal contributions, tallying 13 goals and seven assists.

On 17 August 2024, Havertz scored Arsenal's first goal of the 2024–25 season against Wolves. On 5 October, he equaled Robin van Persie's record of goals in 7 consecutive appearances at the Emirates Stadium. He found the net against Southampton, which followed goals against Paris Saint-Germain, Leicester City, Bolton Wanderers, Brighton & Hove Albion, Wolverhampton Wanderers, and Everton (in 2023–24). On 12 February 2025, The Athletic reported that Havertz would miss the rest of the 2024–25 season after tearing his hamstring while training with the team during a midseason trip in Dubai. Later that year, he appeared in the opening match of the 2025–26 season against Manchester United, but suffered a knee injury a few days later that would sideline him for several months.

On 3 February 2026, Havertz scored a 97th-minute winner against his former club as Arsenal defeated Chelsea 1–0 (4–2 on aggregate) at the Emirates Stadium to secure their place in the Carabao Cup final. He also scored a penalty in the 1–1 UEFA Champions League draw against Bayer Leverkusen on 11 March, equalising in the 89th minute of the Round of 16 first leg tie on his return to the BayArena. On 7 April, Havertz scored a 91st-minute winner in the Quarter Final first leg tie against Sporting Lisbon. On 18 May, he scored the decisive goal in a 1–0 win over Burnley, putting Arsenal on the precipice of their first Premier League title in 22 years. Manchester City only managing a 1–1 draw with Bournemouth the following night sealed Arsenal's triumph, making Havertz the 8th German footballer to win the Premier League.

On 30 May 2026, Havertz scored in the Champions League final against PSG, becoming the first German ever to score in two Champions League finals as well as the third player in football history after Cristiano Ronaldo and Mario Mandžukić to score in two Champions League finals for two different clubs. However, Arsenal went on to lose the Champions League final on penalties after a 1–1 draw after extra time.

On 16 August, Havertz scored in the FA Community Shield final in a 3–0 victory over Manchester City, to clinch another trophy. Five days later, he scored the first Premier League goal of the season to start Arsenal's title defence in a 3–0 victory over Coventry. On 6 September, he scored a goal against his former club Chelsea in a 2–1 win, marking his fourth goal against his ex-club and becoming the joint-highest German goalscorer in Premier League history with 45 goals, equaling the record of Manchester City's ex-player İlkay Gündoğan. On 1 November 2026, Havertz would break the record, scoring his 46th Premier League goal in a 1–0 away win over Liverpool, marking Arsenal’s first win at Anfield in 14 years.

== International career ==
=== Youth ===
Havertz made his debut for the Germany national under-16 team on 11 November 2014, starting in the friendly match against the Czech Republic before being substituted out in the 57th minute for Tom Baack. The match finished as a 3–1 win for Germany.

Havertz was included in Germany's squad for the 2016 UEFA European Under-17 Championship in Azerbaijan. He appeared in all five of Germany's matches, scoring once before Germany were eliminated by Spain in the semi-final.

Following a 15-month absence from youth internationals, Havertz made his debut for Germany's under-19 team, debuting on 31 August 2017 in the 0–0 friendly draw against Switzerland, coming on in the 72nd minute for Palkó Dárdai. On 4 October 2017, in his third appearance for the under-19 team, Havertz scored four goals in a 5–1 win against Belarus in the first round of European Under-19 Championship qualifying. He was later named captain of the under-19 team.

=== Senior ===
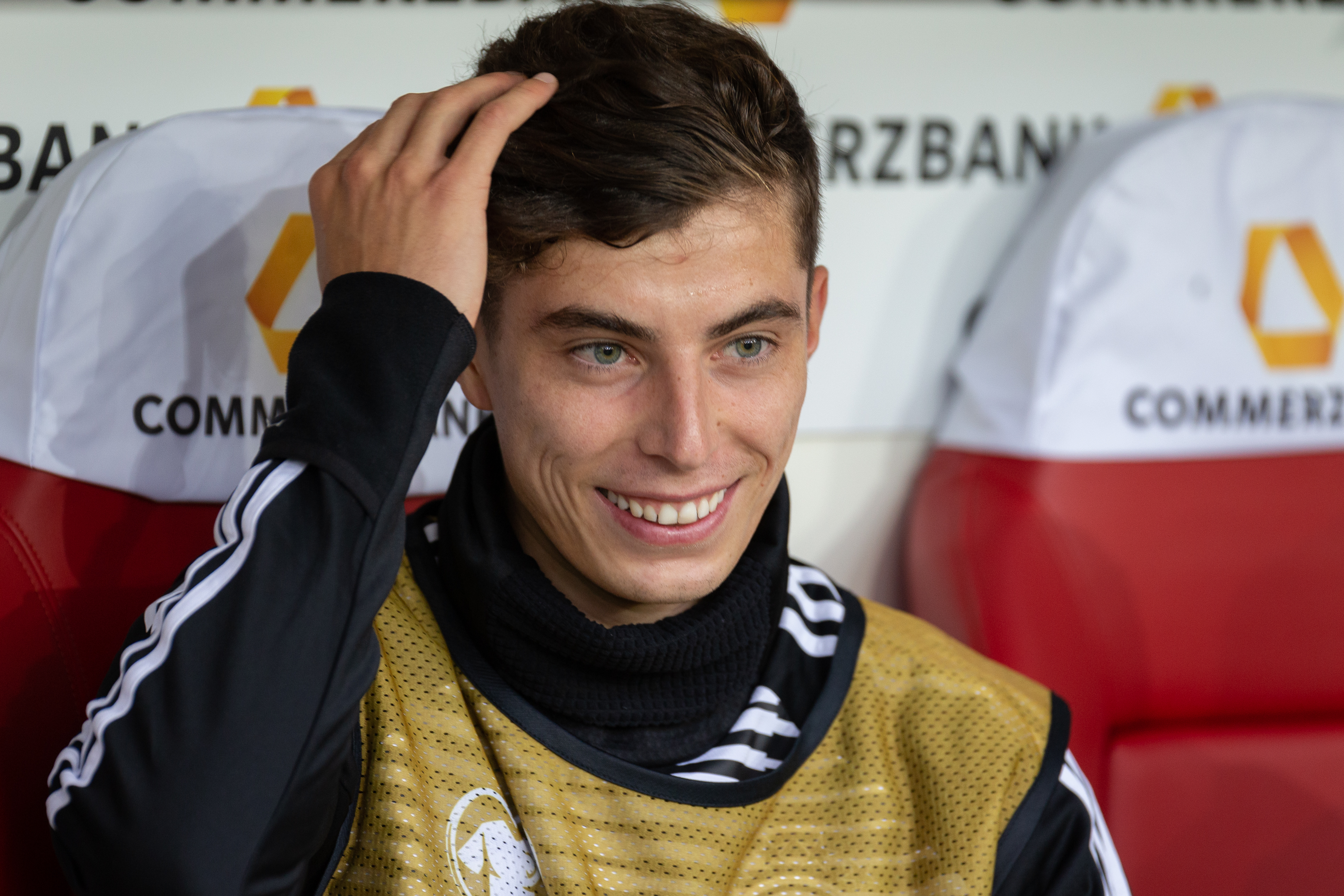
Havertz with Germany in 2019

On 29 August 2018, Havertz was called up to Germany's senior team for the first time by head coach Joachim Löw. He was included in the squad for Germany's UEFA Nations League match against France and friendly against Peru. Havertz made his international debut on 9 September 2018, coming on as a substitute in the 88th minute for Timo Werner against Peru, with the match finishing as a 2–1 home win for Germany. Upon making his debut, he became the first player born in 1999 to represent the national team.

On 19 May 2021, he was selected to the German squad for the UEFA Euro 2020. He scored in both a 4–2 win over Portugal and a 2–2 draw with Hungary in the group stage. Germany were eventually knocked out by England in the round of 16, with Havertz playing the full 90 minutes of the 0–2 loss at Wembley Stadium.

In November 2022, he was selected in the final squad for the 2022 FIFA World Cup in Qatar. He began the tournament as the team's starting striker but was dropped to the bench after the loss to Japan in the opening match. In the final group match against Costa Rica, he appeared as a 67th-minute substitute for Thomas Müller and scored twice to turn a 1–2 deficit into a 3–2 lead. Germany went on to beat the Central Americans 4–2 but did not progress to the knockout stage due to Japan's defeat of Spain in the group's other match.

Havertz was named in Germany's squad for UEFA Euro 2024 and started at centre forward in each of the team's matches. In the opening match of the tournament on 14 June, Havertz played the first 63 minutes, assisting the team's second goal and scoring the third from a penalty kick as Germany won 5–1 against Scotland in Munich. In the round of 16 match against Denmark, Havertz won his 50th cap for the national team, scoring the opening goal of a 2–0 win with a penalty kick. On 5 July, he started the quarter-final match against Spain in Stuttgart, playing 90 minutes before being substituted for Waldemar Anton at the start of extra-time, where the hosts were beaten 2–1 by eventual winners Spain.

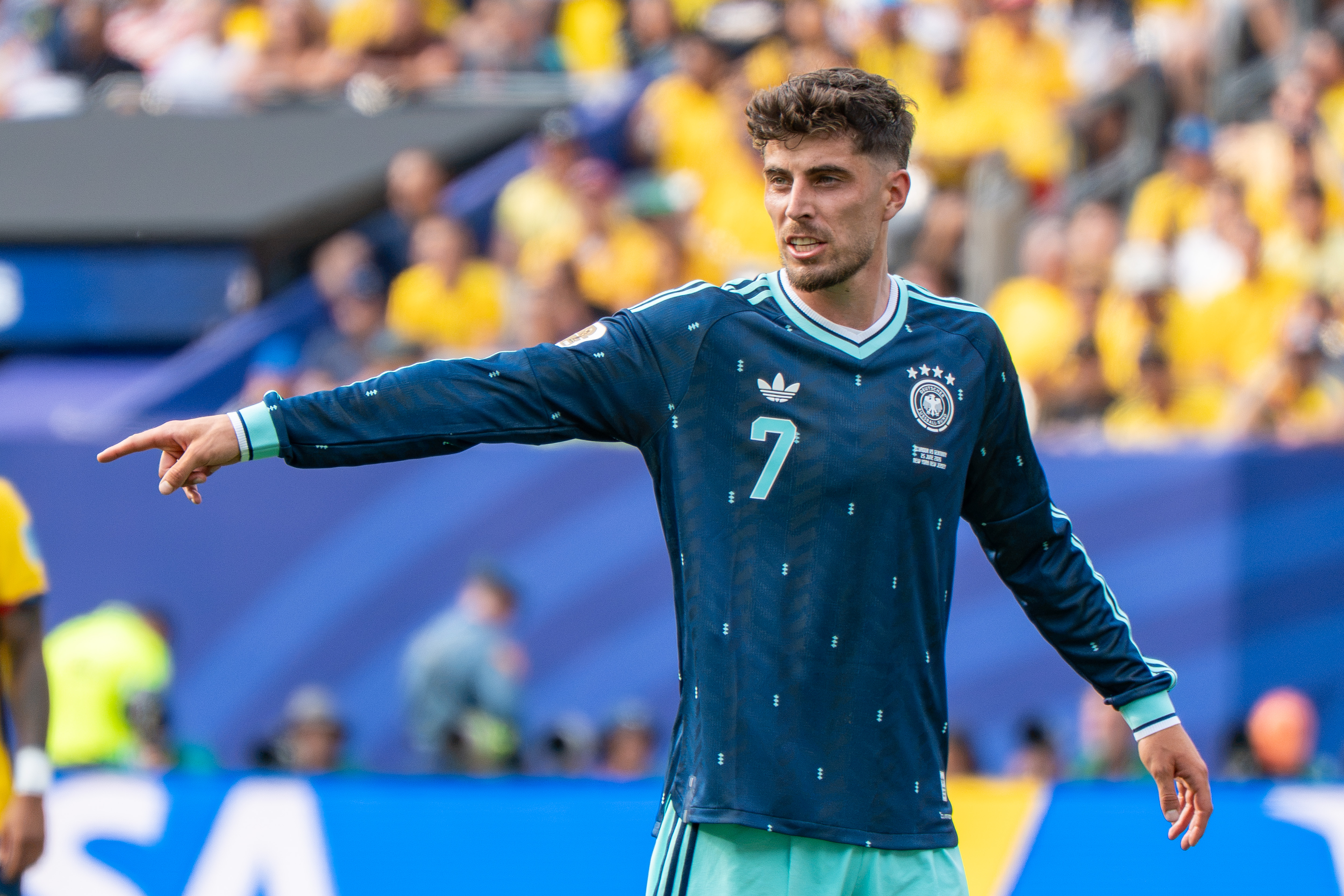
Havertz during Ecuador v Germany at the 2026 FIFA World Cup

On 21 May 2026, Havertz was named in Germany's 26-man squad for the 2026 FIFA World Cup. On 14 June 2026, he was named player of the match after scoring two of seven goals in Germany's opening match win against Curaçao. His goal marked Germany's 239th goal in World Cups, surpassing Brazil as the national team with most goals scored in World Cup history. On 29 June 2026, he scored his 25th goal for the national team, equalizing the Round of 32 match at 1–1 against Paraguay. However in the subsequent penalty shoot-out, Havertz took the first penalty, which was saved by Orlando Gill, and the Germans would go on to lose 4–3, the team's first loss on penalties at the World Cup.

== Player profile ==
=== Style of play ===
Havertz has been described as a technically gifted, two-footed attacking midfielder who possesses refined control and passing skills. During his formative years, his style of play drew comparisons to compatriot Mesut Özil, with Havertz himself stating that Özil was a player he looked up to. By the age of 19, following numerous impressive performances in the Bundesliga, further comparisons had been drawn between Havertz and former Leverkusen players such as Michael Ballack and Toni Kroos, with some describing him as a combination of all three and an Alleskönner – a player capable of doing everything. Ralf Rangnick praising his positional fluidity, technical versatility as a "nine-and-a-half," and spatial awareness, likened Havertz to Johan Cruyff.

Havertz has also been compared to Thomas Müller, as both players have a knack for finding space in congested areas and making intelligent attacking runs, though Havertz has been described as the more elegant and skillful player. Havertz prefers the false nine role, which he played primarily at Chelsea. After his move to Arsenal, Havertz was initially deployed as a left-sided mezzala, but was increasingly utilized as a striker due to his link-up play, pressing ability, and aerial presence.

== Personal life ==
Havertz has been in a relationship with Sophia Weber since 2018. The couple announced their engagement in July 2023 and were married on 18 July the following year. Their first child, a son, was born in March 2025.

== Career statistics ==
=== Club ===
As of match played 1 November 2026

Appearances and goals by club, season and competition
Club	Season	League			National cup (Note: Includes DFB-Pokal, FA Cup)		League cup (Note: Includes EFL Cup)		Europe		Other		Total	
Club	Season	Division	Apps	Goals	Apps	Goals	Apps	Goals	Apps	Goals	Apps	Goals	Apps	Goals
Bayer Leverkusen	2016–17	Bundesliga	24	4	1	0	—		3 (Note: Appearances in UEFA Champions League)	0	—		28	4
Bayer Leverkusen	2017–18	Bundesliga	30	3	5	1	—		—		—		35	4
Bayer Leverkusen	2018–19	Bundesliga	34	17	2	0	—		6 (Note: Appearances in UEFA Europa League)	3	—		42	20
Bayer Leverkusen	2019–20	Bundesliga	30	12	5	2	—		10 (Note: Five appearances in UEFA Champions League, five appearances and four goals in UEFA Europa League)	4	—		45	18
Bayer Leverkusen	Total		118	36	13	3	—		19	7	—		150	46
Chelsea	2020–21	Premier League	27	4	5	1	1	3	12	1	—		45	9
Chelsea	2021–22	Premier League	29	8	3	0	3	2	9	3	3 (Note: One appearance in UEFA Super Cup, two appearances and one goal in FIFA Club World Cup)	1	47	14
Chelsea	2022–23	Premier League	35	7	1	0	1	0	10	2	—		47	9
Chelsea	Total		91	19	9	1	5	5	31	6	3	1	139	32
Arsenal	2023–24	Premier League	37	13	1	0	2	0	10	1	1 (Note: Appearance in FA Community Shield)	0	51	14
Arsenal	2024–25	Premier League	23	9	1	0	4	2	8	4	—		36	15
Arsenal	2025–26	Premier League	12	2	3	0	3	1	6	4	—		24	7
Arsenal	2026–27	Premier League	9	3	0	0	1	0	3	0	1	1	14	4
Arsenal	Total		81	27	5	0	10	3	27	9	2	1	125	40
Career total			290	82	27	4	15	8	77	22	5	2	414	118

=== International ===
As of match played 16 November 2026

Appearances and goals by national team and year
National team	Year	Apps	Goals
Germany	2018	2	0
Germany	2019	5	1
Germany	2020	3	1
Germany	2021	13	5
Germany	2022	10	5
Germany	2023	9	2
Germany	2024	13	6
Germany	2026	10	5
Total		65	25

As of match played 29 June 2026
Germany score listed first, score column indicates score after each Havertz goal.

List of international goals scored by Kai Havertz
No.	Date	Venue	Cap	Opponent	Score	Result	Competition	Ref.
1	9 October 2019	Westfalenstadion, Dortmund, Germany	6	Argentina	2–0	2–2	Friendly	
2	13 October 2020	RheinEnergieStadion, Cologne, Germany	10	Switzerland	2–2	3–3	2020–21 UEFA Nations League A	
3	25 March 2021	MSV-Arena, Duisburg, Germany	11	Iceland	2–0	3–0	2022 FIFA World Cup qualification	
4	19 June 2021	Allianz Arena, Munich, Germany	16	Portugal	3–1	4–2	UEFA Euro 2020	
5	23 June 2021	Allianz Arena, Munich, Germany	17	Hungary	1–1	2–2	UEFA Euro 2020	
6	11 October 2021	Toše Proeski Arena, Skopje, North Macedonia	22	North Macedonia	1–0	4–0	2022 FIFA World Cup qualification	
7	14 November 2021	Vazgen Sargsyan Republican Stadium, Yerevan, Armenia	23	Armenia	1–0	4–1	2022 FIFA World Cup qualification	
8	26 March 2022	Rhein-Neckar-Arena, Sinsheim, Germany	24	Israel	1–0	2–0	Friendly	
9	26 September 2022	Wembley Stadium, London, England	30	England	2–0	3–3	2022–23 UEFA Nations League A	
10	26 September 2022	Wembley Stadium, London, England	30	England	3–3	3–3	2022–23 UEFA Nations League A	
11	1 December 2022	Al Bayt Stadium, Al Khor, Qatar	33	Costa Rica	2–2	4–2	2022 FIFA World Cup	
12	1 December 2022	Al Bayt Stadium, Al Khor, Qatar	33	Costa Rica	3–2	4–2	2022 FIFA World Cup	
13	12 June 2023	Weserstadion, Bremen, Germany	35	Ukraine	2–3	3–3	Friendly	
14	18 November 2023	Olympiastadion, Berlin, Germany	41	Turkey	1–0	2–3	Friendly	
15	23 March 2024	Parc Olympique Lyonnais, Lyon, France	43	France	2–0	2–0	Friendly	
16	7 June 2024	Borussia-Park, Mönchengladbach, Germany	46	Greece	1–1	2–1	Friendly	
17	14 June 2024	Allianz Arena, Munich, Germany	47	Scotland	3–0	5–1	UEFA Euro 2024	
18	29 June 2024	Westfalenstadion, Dortmund, Germany	50	Denmark	1–0	2–0	UEFA Euro 2024	
19	7 September 2024	Merkur Spiel-Arena, Düsseldorf, Germany	52	Hungary	5–0	5–0	2024–25 UEFA Nations League A	
20	16 November 2024	Europa-Park Stadion, Freiburg, Germany	54	Bosnia and Herzegovina	3–0	7–0	2024–25 UEFA Nations League A	
21	30 March 2026	MHP Arena, Stuttgart, Germany	57	Ghana	1–0	2–1	Friendly	
22	6 June 2026	Soldier Field, Chicago, United States	58	United States	1–0	2–1	Friendly	
23	14 June 2026	NRG Stadium, Houston, United States	59	Curaçao	3–1	7–1	2026 FIFA World Cup	
24	14 June 2026	NRG Stadium, Houston, United States	59	Curaçao	7–1	7–1	2026 FIFA World Cup	
25	29 June 2026	Gillette Stadium, Foxborough, United States	62	Paraguay	1–1	1–1 (a.e.t.) (3–4 p)	2026 FIFA World Cup	

== Honours ==
Bayer Leverkusen

- DFB-Pokal runner-up: 2019–20

Chelsea

- UEFA Champions League: 2020–21
- UEFA Super Cup: 2021
- FIFA Club World Cup: 2021
- FA Cup runner-up: 2020–21, 2021–22
- EFL Cup runner-up: 2021–22

Arsenal

- Premier League: 2025–26
- FA Community Shield: 2023, 2026
- EFL Cup runner-up: 2025–26
- UEFA Champions League runner-up: 2025–26

Individual

- UEFA European Under-17 Championship Team of the Tournament: 2016
- Fritz Walter Medal U17 Silver: 2016
- Fritz Walter Medal U19 Gold: 2018
- Bundesliga Team of the Season: 2018–19
- kicker Bundesliga Team of the Season: 2018–19
- Bundesliga Player of the Month: April 2019, May 2019, May 2020
- UEFA Champions League Breakthrough XI: 2019
- UEFA Europa League Squad of the Season: 2019–20
- Arsenal Goal of the Month: August 2024

== See also ==
- List of FIFA World Cup top goalscorers
