= André Wallenborn =

German footballer

Personal information
- Date of birth: 25 March 1995 (age 31)
- Place of birth: Cologne, Germany
- Height: 1.84 m (6 ft 0 in)
- Position: Left-back

Youth career
- –2002: DJK Gremberg-Humboldt
- 2002–2014: 1. FC Köln

Senior career*
Years	Team	Apps	(Gls)
2014–2015	1. FC Köln II	39	(0)
2015–2017	Hallescher FC	10	(1)
2017–2019	Viktoria Köln	9	(0)
2019	Wiedenbrück 2000	13	(0)
2019–2021	Alemannia Aachen	45	(4)
2021–2022	Altona 93	28	(0)
2022–2025	Eintracht Norderstedt	69	(2)
- * Club domestic league appearances and goals as of 1 January 2026

André Wallenborn (born 25 March 1995) is a German footballer who plays as a left-back.
