= Tomasz Kucz =

Polish footballer (born 1999)

Personal information
- Date of birth: 6 July 1999 (age 27)
- Place of birth: Warsaw, Poland
- Height: 1.85 m (6 ft 1 in)
- Position: Goalkeeper

Youth career
- Drukarz Warsaw
- –2015: Polonia Warsaw
- 2015–2018: Bayer Leverkusen

Senior career*
Years	Team	Apps	(Gls)
2018–2019	Bayer Leverkusen	0	(0)
2019	→ DAC Dunajská Streda (loan)	1	(0)
2019–2020	Vitória Guimarães B	0	(0)
2021	Palencia	8	(0)
2021	Kalamata	0	(0)
Total		9	(0)

International career
2015	Poland U16	1	(0)
2016	Poland U17	1	(0)
2017	Poland U19	2	(0)
- * Club domestic league appearances and goals

Tomasz Kucz (born 6 July 1999) is a Polish former professional footballer who played as a goalkeeper.
