= Adrian Stanilewicz =

Association football player

Personal information
- Full name: Adrian Stanilewicz
- Date of birth: 22 February 2000 (age 26)
- Place of birth: Solingen, Germany
- Height: 1.75 m (5 ft 9 in)
- Position: Midfielder

Team information
- Current team: Fortuna Köln
- Number: 20

Youth career
- 2013–2020: Bayer Leverkusen

Senior career*
Years	Team	Apps	(Gls)
2018–2020	Bayer Leverkusen	0	(0)
2020–2022	Darmstadt 98	11	(0)
2022–	Fortuna Köln	111	(11)

International career
2015–2016	Germany U17	5	(1)
2016	Germany U20	3	(0)
2018–2019	Poland U20	10	(0)
- * Club domestic league appearances and goals as of 21:29, 1 June 2026 (UTC)

Adrian Stanilewicz (born 22 February 2000) is a professional footballer who plays as a midfielder for 3. Liga club Fortuna Köln. Initially, he represented Germany internationally on youth level before switching to representing Poland.

== Club career ==
Stanilewicz made his professional debut for Bayer Leverkusen in the UEFA Europa League, coming on as a substitute in the 88th minute for Lucas Alario in the 5–1 away win against Cypriot club AEK Larnaca.

On 7 August 2020, Stanilewicz agreed to sign with SV Darmstadt 98 on a free transfer. He joined the team following Bayer Leverkusen's UEFA Europa League campaign was completed.

On 9 September 2022, he joined Regionalliga West side Fortuna Köln, reuniting with his Bayer youth coach Markus von Ahlen.

== Personal life ==
Stanilewicz was born in Germany and is of Polish descent. He was previously a youth international for Germany, before switching to represent the Poland U20s.

He started all four games played by Poland U20 at the 2019 FIFA U-20 World Cup.

== Honours ==
Fortuna Köln

- Regionalliga West: 2025–26
