= 2025 Coppa Italia final =

77th Coppa Italia final
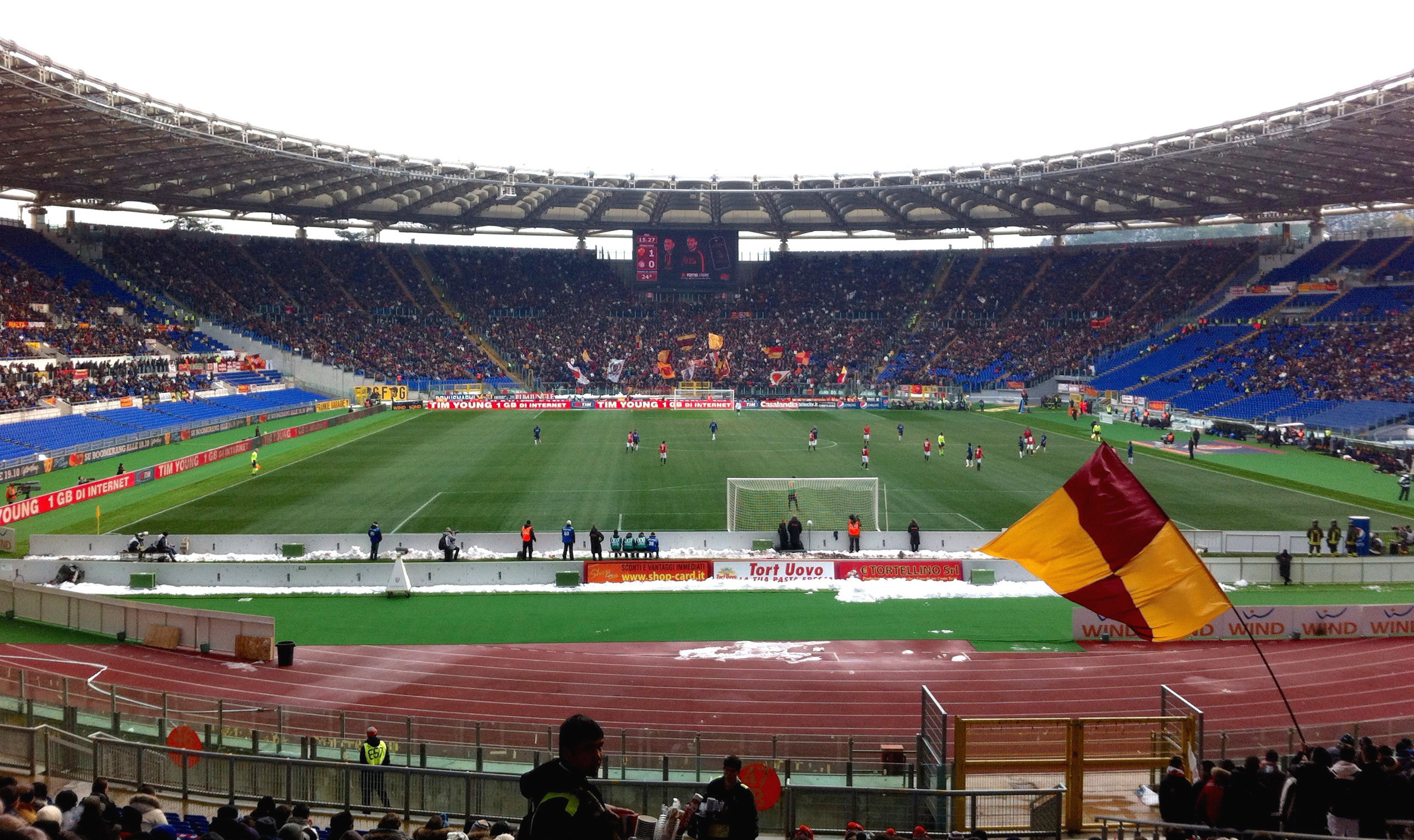
- The Stadio Olimpico in Rome hosted the final
- Event: 2024–25 Coppa Italia
Milan	Bologna
0	1
- Date: 14 May 2025
- Venue: Stadio Olimpico, Rome
- Man of the Match: Dan Ndoye (Bologna)
- Referee: Maurizio Mariani
- Attendance: 68,490

The 2025 Coppa Italia final was the final match of the 2024–25 edition of the Coppa Italia, Italy's premier national football cup. It was played on 14 May 2025 between Milan and Bologna.

Bologna won the match 1–0 for their third Coppa Italia title, and the first since 1974.

== Background ==
Milan had previously played in fourteen Coppa Italia finals, winning five times. Their most recent final appearance was in 2018, a defeat to Juventus; their last win was in 2003, an aggregate victory over Roma. Their last single match victory in Rome dates back to 1973 against Juventus. Bologna had won both their two appearances in the cup final; their most recent appearance was a penalty shoot-out victory to Palermo in 1974. The two teams had never met in the Coppa Italia final.

AC Milan's season turned out to be underwhelming after this Coppa Italia loss, having also finished 8th in the Serie A. Bologna finished one spot lower than Milan in the Serie A, but winning this trophy made this season much grander from the perspective of their fans.

In reaching the final, both teams qualified for the 2025–26 Supercoppa Italiana (for the first time in Bologna's case).

== Road to the final ==
Note: In all results below, the score of the finalist is given first (H: home; A: away).

Milan		Round	Bologna
Opponent	Result	2024–25 Coppa Italia	Opponent	Result
Sassuolo	6–1	Round of 16	Monza	4–0
Roma	3–1	Quarter-finals	Atalanta	1–0 (A)
Internazionale	1–1 (H), 3–0 (A); 4–1 agg.	Semi-finals	Empoli	3–0 (A), 2–1 (H); 5–1 agg.

== Match ==
=== Summary ===
The game started in front of 68,490 people. In the eighth minute, Juan Miranda sent the ball into the penalty area where Santiago Castro attempted to head the ball beyond Mike Maignan, only for the French goalkeeper to save down his bottom right-hand side and Giovanni Fabbian unable to convert the rebound. In the tenth minute, Álex Jiménez sent the ball across towards Luka Jović, however Bologna defender Sam Beukema's attempted block ended up having to be palmed away by Łukasz Skorupski, before Jović's follow up attempt on the rebound was also stopped by the Polish goalkeeper. In the forty-third minute, a header from Emil Holm was gathered by Maignan, moments before Milan attempted a quick counter-attack with Rafael Leão before the Portuguese was caught by a sliding tackle from captain Lewis Ferguson, who received a yellow card as a result.

Neither side made any changes at halftime. In the fifty-third minute, Riccardo Orsolini was played through on goal before Théo Hernandez managed to slide the ball away, but only across towards Dan Ndoye who managed to evade Fikayo Tomori before striking the ball into the right-hand corner of the net. In the sixty-second minute, Milan made a triple sub, putting on Kyle Walker, Santiago Giménez and João Félix for Tomori, Jiménez and Jović. Seven minutes later, Bologna brought on Nicolò Casale and Tommaso Pobega for Fabbian and Orsolini. In the seventy-first minute, Hernandez sent a low ball towards Giménez who was waiting in the middle of the penalty area, however the Mexican didn't connect properly with the ball and Skorupski was left to gather what was a tame effort. Bologna made further substitutions, with Holm, Castro and Ndoye all making way for Davide Calabria, Jens Odgaard and Thijs Dallinga. Meanwhile Milan, hoping to find a late equaliser, introduced Tammy Abraham and Samuel Chukwueze in place of Youssouf Fofana and Christian Pulisic. In the fourth minute of injury time, Odgaard managed to wriggle away from multiple Milan players before striking an effort from outside the penalty area straight into the hands of Maignan. After six minutes of injury time, the game was finished as Bologna won their third Coppa Italia, and their first major trophy since last winning the competition in 1974.

=== Details ===
14 May 2025
21:00 CEST

Milan	0–1	Bologna
	Report	Ndoye 53'

Stadio Olimpico, Rome
Attendance: 68,490
Referee: Maurizio Mariani

Milan	Bologna

GK	16	(France) Mike Maignan (c)
CB	23	(England) Fikayo Tomori	(yellow card) 38'	(substituted off) 62'
CB	46	(Italy) Matteo Gabbia
CB	31	(Serbia) Strahinja Pavlović
RM	20	(Spain) Álex Jiménez		(substituted off) 62'
CM	29	(France) Youssouf Fofana		(substituted off) 88'
CM	14	(Netherlands) Tijjani Reijnders
LM	19	(France) Théo Hernandez
RW	11	(United States) Christian Pulisic	(yellow card) 45+2'	(substituted off) 87'
LW	10	(Portugal) Rafael Leão
CF	9	(Serbia) Luka Jović		(substituted off) 62'
Substitutes:
GK	57	(Italy) Marco Sportiello
GK	96	(Italy) Lorenzo Torriani
DF	22	(Brazil) Emerson Royal
DF	24	(Italy) Alessandro Florenzi
DF	28	(Germany) Malick Thiaw
DF	32	(England) Kyle Walker		(substituted on) 62'
DF	33	(Italy) Davide Bartesaghi
MF	8	(England) Ruben Loftus-Cheek
MF	42	(Italy) Filippo Terracciano
MF	80	(United States) Yunus Musah
FW	7	(Mexico) Santiago Giménez		(substituted on) 62'
FW	21	(Nigeria) Samuel Chukwueze		(substituted on) 88'
FW	73	(Italy) Francesco Camarda
FW	79	(Portugal) João Félix		(substituted on) 62'
FW	90	(England) Tammy Abraham		(substituted on) 87'
Manager:
(Portugal) Sérgio Conceição

GK	1	(Poland) Łukasz Skorupski
RB	2	(Sweden) Emil Holm		(substituted off) 76'
CB	31	(Netherlands) Sam Beukema
CB	26	(Colombia) Jhon Lucumí	(yellow card) 74'
LB	33	(Spain) Juan Miranda
CM	8	(Switzerland) Remo Freuler
CM	19	(Scotland) Lewis Ferguson (c)	(yellow card) 43'
CM	80	(Italy) Giovanni Fabbian	(yellow card) 57'	(substituted off) 69'
RF	7	(Italy) Riccardo Orsolini		(substituted off) 69'
CF	9	(Argentina) Santiago Castro		(substituted off) 80'
LF	11	(Switzerland) Dan Ndoye		(substituted off) 80'
Substitutes:
GK	23	(Italy) Nicola Bagnolini
GK	34	(Italy) Federico Ravaglia
DF	5	(Croatia) Martin Erlić
DF	14	(Italy) Davide Calabria		(substituted on) 76'
DF	15	(Italy) Nicolò Casale		(substituted on) 69'
DF	22	(Greece) Charalampos Lykogiannis
DF	29	(Italy) Lorenzo De Silvestri
MF	6	(Croatia) Nikola Moro
MF	17	(Morocco) Oussama El Azzouzi
MF	18	(Italy) Tommaso Pobega		(substituted on) 69'
MF	20	(Switzerland) Michel Aebischer
FW	21	(Denmark) Jens Odgaard		(substituted on) 80'
FW	24	(Netherlands) Thijs Dallinga		(substituted on) 80'
FW	28	(Italy) Nicolò Cambiaghi
FW	30	(Argentina) Benjamín Domínguez
Manager:
(Italy) Vincenzo Italiano

Man of the Match:
Dan Ndoye (Bologna)

Assistant referees:
Giorgio Peretti
Valerio Colarossi
Fourth official:
Gianluca Manganiello
Reserve assistant referee:
Marco Bresmes
Video assistant referee:
Francesco Meraviglia
Assistant video assistant referee:
Paolo Mazzoleni

Match rules

- 90 minutes.
- 30 minutes of extra time if necessary.
- Penalty shoot-out if scores still level.
- Fifteen named substitutes.
- Maximum of five substitutions, with a sixth allowed in extra time. (Note: Each team was given only three opportunities to make substitutions, excluding substitutions made at half-time, before the start of extra time and at half-time in extra time.)

== See also ==
- 2024–25 Bologna FC 1909 season
- 2024–25 AC Milan season
