= Victor Kristiansen =

Danish footballer (born 2002)

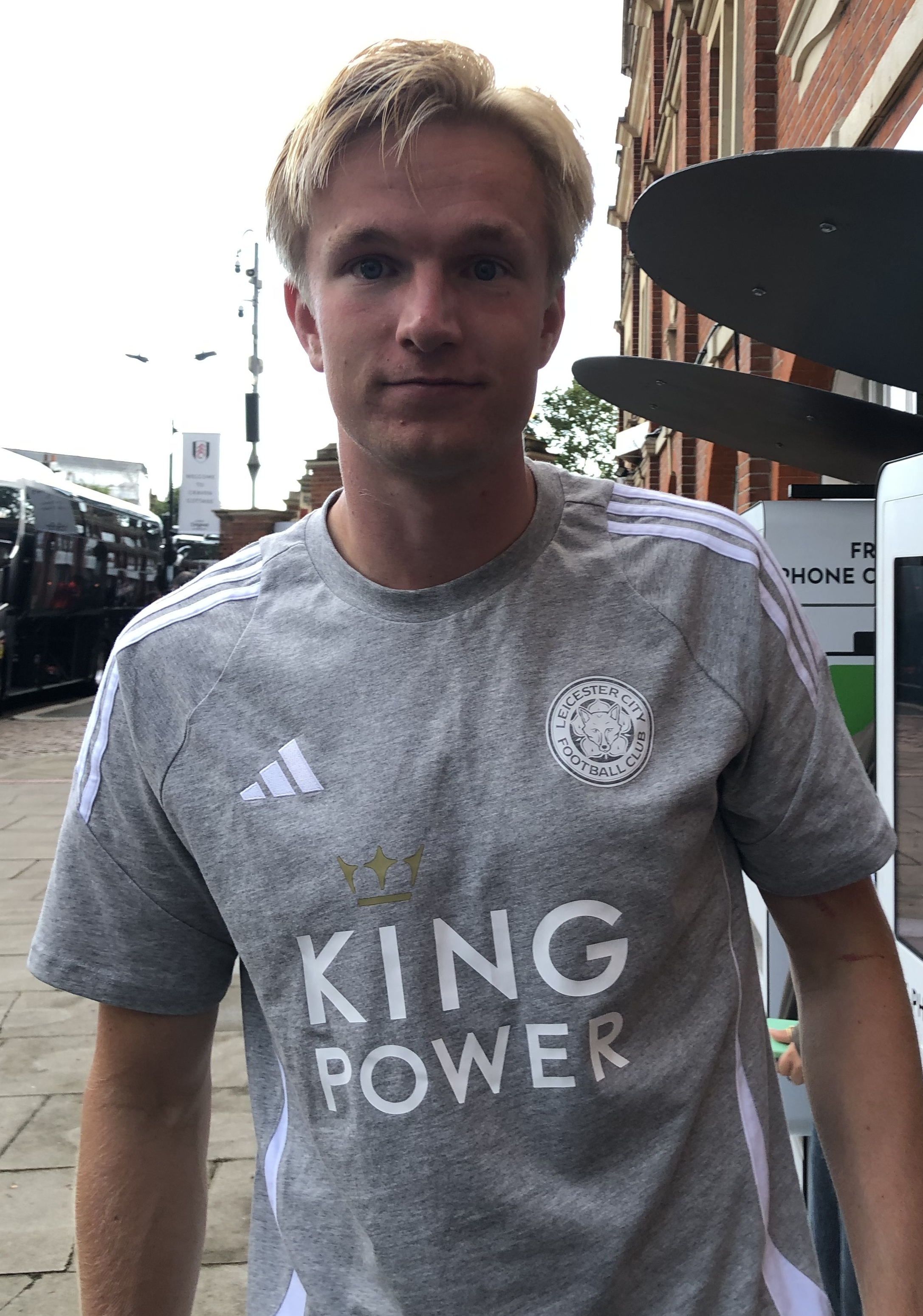
- Kristiansen with Leicester City in 2024

Personal information
- Full name: Victor Bernth Flesner Kristiansen
- Date of birth: 16 December 2002 (age 23)
- Place of birth: Copenhagen, Denmark
- Height: 1.81 m (5 ft 11 in)
- Position: Left-back

Team information
- Current team: Panathinaikos (on loan from Leicester City)
- Number: 34

Youth career
- Copenhagen

Senior career*
Years	Team	Apps	(Gls)
2020–2023	Copenhagen	51	(1)
2023–	Leicester City	47	(0)
2023–2024	→ Bologna (loan)	32	(0)
2026–	→ Panathinaikos (loan)	0	(0)

International career^{‡}
2018	Denmark U16	4	(0)
2018–2019	Denmark U17	7	(0)
2019–2020	Denmark U18	5	(0)
2021–2023	Denmark U21	9	(0)
2023–	Denmark	18	(0)
- * Club domestic league appearances and goals as of 23:43, 21 February 2026 (UTC) ‡ National team caps and goals as of 09:51, 24 March 2025 (UTC)

Victor Bernth Flesner Kristiansen (Danish pronunciation: [ˈviɡ.tɒ ˈkʰʁis.djæn.sən]; born 16 December 2002) is a Danish professional footballer who plays as a left-back for Super League Greece club Panathinaikos, on loan from EFL League One club Leicester City and the Denmark national team.

== Club career ==
=== Copenhagen ===
A youth academy graduate of Copenhagen, Kristiansen made his senior team debut on 4 November 2020 in a 2–1 cup win against Avarta. He made his professional debut on 29 November 2020 in a 3–1 league win against SønderjyskE.

On 20 December 2020, four days after turning 18, Kristiansen signed a contract extension with Copenhagen which would run until December 2023.

=== Leicester City ===
On 20 January 2023, Kristiansen signed for Leicester City for a record-breaking fee of £17 million, making him the most expensive Danish Superliga player ever. On 28 January 2023, he made his debut for Leicester as a substitute in a 1–0 away win against Walsall in the FA Cup fourth round.

==== Loan to Bologna ====
On 30 August 2023, Kristiansen was sent on a season-long loan to Serie A club Bologna. He made his debut for the club on 2 September, starting in a 2–1 league victory against Cagliari. He immediately proved decisive, providing an assist for Joshua Zirkzee's 1–1 equaliser in the 59th minute. Later, his cross hit an opposing defender's arm in the penalty area, but his teammate Riccardo Orsolini missed the attempt from 12 yards. However, Kristiansen's shot on target in the 89th minute resulted in a blunder by goalkeeper Boris Radunović, and Giovanni Fabbian scored from the rebound.

==== Return to Leicester City ====
Bologna did not activate the buy option in Kristiansen's loan, so for the 2024–25 season, he returned to Leicester City. On 3 December, he assisted Patson Daka's goal in the 3–1 win over West Ham.

== International career ==
Kristiansen represented Denmark at various youth levels, up to and including Under 21. After being named in previous squads, Kristiansen finally made his debut for the senior Danish side when he came on as a second-half substitute away to Slovenia in a UEFA Euro 2024 qualifier.

== Career statistics ==
=== Club ===
As of match played 21 February 2026

Appearances and goals by club, season and competition
Club	Season	League			National cup (Note: Includes Danish Cup, FA Cup, Coppa Italia)		League cup (Note: Includes EFL Cup)		Europe		Total	
Club	Season	Division	Apps	Goals	Apps	Goals	Apps	Goals	Apps	Goals	Apps	Goals
Copenhagen	2020–21	Danish Superliga	15	0	1	0	—		0	0	16	0
Copenhagen	2021–22	Danish Superliga	21	0	1	0	—		11 (Note: Appearances in UEFA Europa Conference League)	0	33	0
Copenhagen	2022–23	Danish Superliga	14	1	1	0	—		8 (Note: Appearances in UEFA Champions League)	0	24	1
Copenhagen	Total		51	1	3	0	—		19	0	73	1
Leicester City	2022–23	Premier League	12	0	2	0	0	0	—		14	0
Leicester City	2024–25	Premier League	30	0	1	0	0	0	—		31	0
Leicester City	2025–26	Championship	5	0	1	0	0	0	—		6	0
Leicester City	Total		47	0	4	0	0	0	—		51	0
Bologna (loan)	2023–24	Serie A	32	0	2	0	—		—		34	0
Career total			130	1	9	0	0	0	19	0	158	1

=== International ===
As of match played 23 March 2025

Appearances and goals by national team and year
National team	Year	Apps	Goals
Denmark	2023	4	0
Denmark	2024	13	0
Denmark	2025	1	0
Total		18	0

== Honours ==
Copenhagen

- Danish Superliga: 2021–22, 2022–23
