= 2023–24 Bologna FC 1909 season =

Bologna
2023–24 season
- Chairman: Joey Saputo
- Head coach: Thiago Motta
- Stadium: Stadio Renato Dall'Ara
- Serie A: 5th
- Coppa Italia: Quarter-finals
- Top goalscorer: League: Joshua Zirkzee (11); All: Joshua Zirkzee (12)
- Highest home attendance: 30,204 vs Internazionale
- Lowest home attendance: 11,593 vs Hellas Verona
- Average home league attendance: 25,914
- Biggest win: Bologna 4–0 Lecce
- Biggest defeat: Udinese 3–0 Bologna
Home colours	Away colours	Third colours

The 2023–24 season was Bologna FC 1909's 115th season in existence and ninth consecutive season in the Serie A. They also competed in the Coppa Italia.

On 12 May 2024, Bologna clinched qualification to the UEFA Champions League, returning to Europe's top-tier club competition for the first time in the Champions League era and first time in any capacity since 1965.

== Players ==
=== First-team squad ===
As of 2 February 2024

Note: Flags indicate national team as defined under FIFA eligibility rules; some limited exceptions apply. Players may hold more than one non-FIFA nationality.

No.	Pos.	Nation	Player
3	DF	AUT	Stefan Posch
4	DF	SRB	Mihajlo Ilić
5	DF	FRA	Adama Soumaoro
6	MF	CRO	Nikola Moro
7	FW	ITA	Riccardo Orsolini
8	MF	SUI	Remo Freuler (on loan from Nottingham Forest)
9	FW	NED	Joshua Zirkzee
10	FW	SWE	Jesper Karlsson
11	MF	SUI	Dan Ndoye
15	DF	DEN	Victor Kristiansen (on loan from Leicester City)
16	DF	ITA	Tommaso Corazza
17	MF	MAR	Oussama El Azzouzi
18	FW	ARG	Santiago Castro

No.	Pos.	Nation	Player
19	MF	SCO	Lewis Ferguson (captain)
21	FW	DEN	Jens Odgaard (on loan from AZ)
22	DF	GRE	Charalampos Lykogiannis
23	GK	ITA	Nicola Bagnolini
26	DF	COL	Jhon Lucumí
28	GK	POL	Łukasz Skorupski
29	DF	ITA	Lorenzo De Silvestri
31	DF	NED	Sam Beukema
33	DF	ITA	Riccardo Calafiori
34	GK	ITA	Federico Ravaglia
56	MF	BEL	Alexis Saelemaekers (on loan from Milan)
80	MF	ITA	Giovanni Fabbian
82	MF	POL	Kacper Urbański

=== Out on loan ===
As of 5 September 2023

Note: Flags indicate national team as defined under FIFA eligibility rules; some limited exceptions apply. Players may hold more than one non-FIFA nationality.

No.	Pos.	Nation	Player
—	DF	GHA	Ebenezer Annan (at Novi Pazar until 30 June 2024)
—	DF	ENG	Luis Binks (at Coventry City until 30 June 2024)
—	DF	ITA	Kevin Bonifazi (at Frosinone until 30 June 2024)
—	DF	ITA	Riccardo Stivanello (at Juventus Next Gen until 30 June 2024)
—	DF	URU	Joaquín Sosa (at CF Montréal until 31 December 2024)
—	MF	ISL	Andri Baldursson (at IF Elfsborg until 30 June 2024)
—	MF	FIN	Niklas Pyyhtiä (at Ternana until 30 June 2024)

No.	Pos.	Nation	Player
—	FW	ITA	Gennaro Anatriello (at Alessandria until 30 June 2024)
—	FW	AUT	Marko Arnautović (at Internazionale until 30 June 2024)
—	FW	ITA	Gianmarco Cangiano (at Pescara until 30 June 2024)
—	FW	NGR	Orji Okwonkwo (at Reggiana until 30 June 2024)
—	FW	ITA	Mattia Pagliuca (at Brindisi until 30 June 2024)
—	FW	ITA	Antonio Raimondo (at Ternana until 30 June 2024)
—	FW	NED	Sydney van Hooijdonk (at Norwich City until 30 June 2024)

== Transfers ==
=== Summer window ===
==== In ====
Date	Pos.	Player	From	Fee	Notes	Source
1 July 2023	DF	(Austria) Stefan Posch	(Germany) 1899 Hoffenheim	€5,000,000	Buy option exercised	
2 July 2023	MF	(Croatia) Nikola Moro	(Russia) Dynamo Moscow	€6,000,000	Buy option exercised	
3 July 2023	DF	(Netherlands) Sam Beukema	(Netherlands) AZ	€7,000,000		
20 July 2023	MF	(Morocco) Oussama El Azzouzi	(Belgium) Union Saint-Gilloise	€2,000,000		
14 August 2023	MF	(Switzerland) Dan Ndoye	(Switzerland) Basel	€8,000,000		
20 August 2023	MF	(Italy) Giovanni Fabbian	(Italy) Internazionale	€5,000,000		
23 August 2023	MF	(Sweden) Jesper Karlsson	(Netherlands) AZ	€11,000,000		
31 August 2023	DF	(Italy) Riccardo Calafiori	(Switzerland) Basel	€4,000,000		

==== Loans in ====
Date	Pos.	Player	From	Fee	Notes	Source
30 August 2023	DF	(Denmark) Victor Kristiansen	(England) Leicester City	€1,000,000	+ option to buy for €15,000,000	
30 August 2023	MF	(Belgium) Alexis Saelemaekers	(Italy) Milan	€500,000	+ option to buy for €10,000,000	
1 September 2023	MF	(Switzerland) Remo Freuler	(England) Nottingham Forest	Free	Part of swap deal for Nicolás Domínguez + option to buy for €15,000,000	

==== Out ====
Date	Pos.	Player	To	Fee	Notes	Source
1 July 2023	MF	(Italy) Roberto Soriano	Unattached	Released		
1 July 2023	FW	(Italy) Nicola Sansone	(Italy) Lecce	Released		
3 July 2023	FW	(The Gambia) Musa Juwara	(Denmark) Vejle Boldklub	Free		
3 July 2023	DF	(Netherlands) Denso Kasius	(Netherlands) AZ	€3,000,000		
6 July 2023	GK	(Italy) Francesco Bardi	(Italy) Reggiana	Free		
7 July 2023	DF	(Italy) Matteo Angeli	(Italy) Cittadella	Free	+ buy-back option	
11 July 2023	MF	(Chile) Gary Medel	(Brazil) Vasco da Gama	Free		
2 August 2023	MF	(Italy) Dion Ruffo Luci	(Italy) Rimini	Free		
8 August 2023	FW	(Italy) Matias Rocchi	(Italy) Corticella	Free		
16 August 2023	MF	(Netherlands) Jerdy Schouten	(Netherlands) PSV Eindhoven	€12,000,000		
1 September 2023	MF	(Argentina) Nicolás Domínguez	(England) Nottingham Forest	€10,000,000	Part of swap deal for Remo Freuler	
1 September 2023	MF	(Nigeria) Kingsley Michael	(Austria) Leoben	Free		
1 September 2023	FW	(Italy) Emanuel Vignato	(Italy) Pisa	€500,000		
4 September 2023	MF	(The Gambia) Musa Barrow	(Saudi Arabia) Al-Taawoun	€8,000,000		

==== Loans out ====
Date	Pos.	Player	To	Fee	Notes	Source
6 July 2023	DF	(Ghana) Ebenezer Annan	(Serbia) Novi Pazar	Free		
12 July 2023	GK	(Canada) Sebastian Breza	(Switzerland) Yverdon	Free		
28 July 2023	DF	(England) Luis Binks	(England) Coventry City	Free		
10 August 2023	MF	(Iceland) Andri Fannar Baldursson	(Sweden) IF Elfsborg	Free		
10 August 2023	FW	(Italy) Gianmarco Cangiano	(Italy) Pescara	Free		
10 August 2023	FW	(Italy) Antonio Raimondo	(Italy) Ternana	Free		
16 August 2023	FW	(Austria) Marko Arnautović	(Italy) Internazionale	Free	+ obligation to buy for €10,000,000 under conditions	
17 August 2023	MF	(Finland) Niklas Pyyhtiä	(Italy) Ternana	Free		
21 August 2023	FW	(Italy) Mattia Pagliuca	(Italy) Alessandria	Free		
4 September 2023	DF	(Uruguay) Joaquín Sosa	(Croatia) Dinamo Zagreb	Free	+ option to buy + buy-back option	

=== Winter window ===
==== In ====
Date	Pos.	Player	From	Fee	Notes	Source
10 January 2024	DF	(Uruguay) Joaquín Sosa	(Croatia) Dinamo Zagreb	Free	Loan termination	
14 January 2024	GK	(Canada) Sebastian Breza	(Switzerland) Yverdon	Free	Loan termination	
18 January 2024	DF	(Serbia) Mihajlo Ilić	(Serbia) Partizan	€4,500,000		
30 January 2024	FW	(Argentina) Santiago Castro	(Argentina) Vélez Sarsfield	€12,000,000		
31 January 2024	FW	(Italy) Mattia Pagliuca	(Italy) Alessandria	Free	Loan termination	

==== Loans in ====
Date	Pos.	Player	From	Fee	Notes	Source
1 February 2024	FW	(Denmark) Jens Odgaard	(Netherlands) AZ	Free	+ option to buy for €4,000,000	

==== Out ====
Date	Pos.	Player	To	Fee	Notes	Source
15 January 2024	GK	(Canada) Sebastian Breza	(Canada) CF Montréal	Free		

==== Loans out ====
Date	Pos.	Player	To	Fee	Notes	Source
8 January 2024	DF	(Italy) Kevin Bonifazi	(Italy) Frosinone	Free		
15 January 2024	DF	(Uruguay) Joaquín Sosa	(Canada) CF Montréal	Free		
1 February 2024	FW	(Netherlands) Sydney van Hooijdonk	(England) Norwich City	Free	+ option to buy	
1 February 2024	FW	(Nigeria) Orji Okwonkwo	(Italy) Reggiana	Free	until 30 June 2025	

== Pre-season and friendlies ==
Win Draw Loss Fixtures

22 July 2023 Friendly	Bologna (Italy)	2–2	(Italy) Palermo	Rovereto
18:00 CEST (UTC+2)				Stadium: Stadio Quercia

28 July 2023 Friendly	Bologna (Italy)	2–3	(France) Monaco	Bologna
18:00 CEST (UTC+2)				Stadium: Centro Tecnico Niccolò Galli; Referee: Volpi

2 August 2023 Friendly	Utrecht (Netherlands)	1–2	(Italy) Bologna	Utrecht
15:00 CEST (UTC+2)	Descotte 56'	Report	Zirkzee 76'; De Silvestri 79'	Stadium: Sportcomplex Zoudenbalch; Referee: Dieperink

5 August 2023 Friendly	AZ (Netherlands)	1–0	(Italy) Bologna	Alkmaar
17:00 CEST (UTC+2)	Poku 47'	Report		Stadium: AFAS Stadion; Referee: Dennis Higler

9 September 2023 Friendly	Bologna (Italy)	2–2	(Italy) Reggiana	Bologna
11:00 CEST (UTC+2)	De Silvestri 18'; Van Hooijdonk 83'	Report	Gondo 33'; Antiste 40'	Stadium: Centro tecnico Niccolò Galli; Attendance: 0 Referee: Prontera

13 September 2023 Friendly	Bologna (Italy)	1–0	(Italy) Arezzo	Casteldebole
--:-- CEST (UTC+2)	Zirkzee 57'	Report		Stadium: centro sportivo rossoblu Referee: Prontera

== Competitions ==
=== Overall record ===
Competition	First match	Last match	Starting round	Final position	Record							
Competition	First match	Last match	Starting round	Final position	Pld	W	D	L	GF	GA	GD	Win %
Serie A	21 August 2023	24 May 2024	Matchday 1	5th	38	18	14	6	54	32	+22	47.37
Coppa Italia	11 August 2023	9 January 2024	Round of 64	Quarter-finals	4	3	1	0	6	1	+5	75.00
Total					42	21	15	6	60	33	+27	50.00

Source: Soccerway

=== Serie A ===
==== League table ====
Pos	Team	Pld	W	D	L	GF	GA	GD	Pts	Qualification or relegation
3	Juventus	38	19	14	5	54	31	+23	71	Qualification for the Champions League league phase (Note: Serie A gained an additional Champions League place as a result of Italy finishing as one of the two associations with the highest coefficient points in 2023–24.)
4	Atalanta	38	21	6	11	72	42	+30	69	Qualification for the Champions League league phase
5	Bologna	38	18	14	6	54	32	+22	68	Qualification for the Champions League league phase
6	Roma	38	18	9	11	65	46	+19	63	Qualification for the Europa League league phase (Note: Since the winners of the 2023–24 Coppa Italia, Juventus, qualified for the Champions League, the Europa League berth awarded to the Coppa Italia winners was passed to the seventh-placed team, and the Conference League berth was passed to the eighth-placed team.)
7	Lazio	38	18	7	13	49	39	+10	61	Qualification for the Europa League league phase

Source: Serie A
Rules for classification: 1) Points; 2) Tiebreaker for Champions team and third relegated team; 3) Head-to-head points; 4) Head-to-head goal difference; 5) Goal difference; 6) Goals scored; 7) Draw.
(Note: Head-to-head record is used only after all the matches between the teams in question have been played)

==== Results summary ====
Overall								Home						Away					
Pld	W	D	L	GF	GA	GD	Pts	W	D	L	GF	GA	GD	W	D	L	GF	GA	GD
38	18	14	6	54	32	+22	68	12	5	2	33	12	+21	6	9	4	21	20	+1

Source: Serie A

==== Results by round ====
Round	1	2	3	4	5	6	7	8	9	10	11	12	13	14	15	16	17	18	19	20	21	22	23	24	25	26	27	28	29	30	31	32	33	34	35	36	37	38
Ground	H	A	H	A	H	A	H	A	H	A	H	A	H	A	A	H	H	A	H	A	H	A	H	H	A	H	A	H	A	H	A	H	A	H	A	A	H	A
Result	L	D	W	D	D	D	W	D	W	D	W	L	W	D	W	W	W	L	D	L	W	D	W	W	W	W	W	L	W	W	D	D	W	D	D	W	D	L
Position	16	14	9	11	11	13	8	11	8	8	6	8	6	7	5	4	4	5	5	7	8	8	6	5	5	4	4	4	4	4	4	4	4	4	4	3	3	5

Source: Serie A
A = Away; H = Home; W = Win; D = Draw; L = Loss

==== Matches ====
The league fixtures were unveiled on 5 July 2023.

21 August 2023 1	Bologna	0–2	Milan	Bologna
20:45 CEST (UTC+2)	Aebischer (yellow card) 30'; Zirkzee (yellow card) 77'	Report	Giroud 11'; Pulisic 21'; Hernandez (yellow card) 51'; Krunić (yellow card) 76'	Stadium: Stadio Renato Dall'Ara; Attendance: 30,203; Referee: Luca Pairetto

27 August 2023 2	Juventus	1–1	Bologna	Turin
18:30 CEST (UTC+2)	Rabiot (yellow card) 12'; Vlahović 80'; Yıldız (yellow card) 87'	Report	Posch (yellow card) 17'; Ferguson 24'	Stadium: Juventus Stadium; Attendance: 38,197; Referee: Marco Di Bello

2 September 2023 3	Bologna	2–1	Cagliari	Bologna
18:30 CEST (UTC+2)	Ferguson (yellow card) 40'; Zirkzee 59'; Orsolini (penalty missed) 75'; Fabbian 89'	Report	Luvumbo 22'; Sulemana (yellow card) 70'; Makoumbou (yellow card) 90+2'	Stadium: Stadio Renato Dall'Ara; Attendance: 22,818; Referee: Daniele Orsato

18 September 2023 4	Hellas Verona	0–0	Bologna	Verona
20:45 CEST (UTC+2)	Dawidowicz (yellow card) 18'; Faraoni (yellow card) 50'; Serdar (yellow card) 90+3'; Suslov (yellow card) 90+3'	Report	Kristiansen (yellow card) 37'; Posch (yellow card) 73'	Stadium: Stadio Marcantonio Bentegodi; Attendance: 18,863; Referee: Federico La Penna

24 September 2023 5	Bologna	0–0	Napoli	Bologna
18:00 CEST (UTC+2)	Aebischer (yellow card) 30'; Ndoye (yellow card) 55'; Skorupski (yellow card) 72'; Freuler (yellow card) 81'	Report	Olivera (yellow card) 6'; Lobotka (yellow card) 49'; Kvaratskhelia (yellow card) 53'; Osimhen (penalty missed) 72'; Politano (yellow card) 82'; Mário Rui (yellow card) 90+4'	Stadium: Stadio Renato Dall'Ara; Attendance: 26,621; Referee: Giovanni Ayroldi

28 September 2023 6	Monza	0–0	Bologna	Monza
18:30 CEST (UTC+2)	Vignato (yellow card) 70'; Birindelli (yellow card) 80'; Ciurria (yellow card) 85'; Gagliardini (yellow card) 88'; Marí (yellow card) 90+3'	Report	Orsolini (yellow card) 12'; Saelemaekers (yellow card) 87' (yellow-red card) 87'	Stadium: Stadio Brianteo; Attendance: 8,930; Referee: Ivano Pezzuto

1 October 2023 7	Bologna	3–0	Empoli	Bologna
12:30 CEST (UTC+2)	Orsolini 21', 66', 90+2'; Corazza (yellow card) 44'; El Azzouzi (yellow card) 58'	Report	Cacace (yellow card) 10'; Walukiewicz (yellow card) 39'; Ranocchia (yellow card) 45+3'; Cancellieri (yellow card) 81'	Stadium: Stadio Renato Dall'Ara; Attendance: 23,689; Referee: Fabio Maresca

7 October 2023 8	Internazionale	2–2	Bologna	Milan
15:00 CEST (UTC+2)	Acerbi 11'; Martínez 13', (yellow card) 58'; Bastoni (yellow card) 90'	Report	Orsolini 19' (pen.); Ndoye (yellow card) 33'; Zirkzee 52'; Beukema (yellow card) 90+3'; Ferguson (yellow card) 90+4'	Stadium: San Siro; Attendance: 74,072; Referee: Marco Guida

22 October 2023 9	Bologna	2–1	Frosinone	Bologna
15:00 CEST (UTC+2)	Ferguson 19'; De Silvestri 22'; Aebischer (yellow card) 59'; Zirkzee (yellow card) 88'	Report	Soulé 63' (pen.); Mazzitelli (yellow card) 88' (yellow-red card) 90+4'	Stadium: Stadio Renato Dall'Ara; Attendance: 26,729; Referee: Daniele Doveri

28 October 2023 10	Sassuolo	1–1	Bologna	Reggio Emilia
15:00 CEST (UTC+2)	Boloca 44'; Berardi (yellow card) 90'	Report	Zirkzee 3'; Lykogiannis (yellow card) 58'; El Azzouzi (yellow card) 71'; Saelemaekers (yellow card) 90+5'	Stadium: Mapei Stadium – Città del Tricolore; Attendance: 16,931; Referee: Antonio Giua

3 November 2023 11	Bologna	1–0	Lazio	Bologna
20:45 CET (UTC+1)	Ferguson 46', (yellow card) 50'; Beukema (yellow card) 56'	Report	Pedro (yellow card) 35'; Romagnoli (yellow card) 50'; Luis Alberto (yellow card) 65'; Zaccagni (yellow card) 80'; Isaksen (yellow card) 90+6'	Stadium: Stadio Renato Dall'Ara; Attendance: 24,178; Referee: Federico La Penna

12 November 2023 12	Fiorentina	2–1	Bologna	Florence
15:00 CET (UTC+1)	Bonaventura 17', (yellow card) 45+2'; González 48' (pen.); Ranieri (yellow card) 90+5'	Report	Zirkzee 33' (pen.); Saelemaekers (yellow card) 36'; Aebischer (yellow card) 45+2'	Stadium: Stadio Artemio Franchi; Attendance: 29,750; Referee: Fabio Maresca

27 November 2023 13	Bologna	2–0	Torino	Bologna
20:45 CET (UTC+1)	Kristiansen (yellow card) 23'; Fabbian (yellow card) 31', (goal) 56'; Zirkzee 90+1'; Ndoye (yellow card) 90+6'	Report	Linetty (yellow card) 39'; Lazaro (yellow card) 62'; Bellanova (yellow card) 69'; Pellegri (yellow card) 74'	Stadium: Stadio Renato Dall'Ara; Attendance: 20,705; Referee: Andrea Colombo

3 December 2023 14	Lecce	1–1	Bologna	Lecce
12:30 CET (UTC+1)	Ramadani (yellow card) 45'; Pongračić (yellow card) 84'; Sansone (yellow card) 90'; Piccoli 90+10' (pen.)	Report	Saelemaekers (yellow card) 52'; Lykogiannis 68'; Calafiori (yellow card) 90+10'	Stadium: Stadio Via del mare Attendance: 24,326; Referee: Daniele Doveri

10 December 2023 15	Salernitana	1–2	Bologna	Salerno
18:00 CET (UTC+1)	Coulibaly (yellow card) 26'; Tchaouna (yellow card) 37'; Mazzocchi (yellow card) 39'; Dia (yellow card) 43'; Daniliuc (yellow card) 48'; Gyömbér (yellow card) 54'; Simy 75'; Kastanos (yellow card) 89'; Fazio (red card) 90+3'	Report	Zirkzee 9', 20', (yellow card) 44'; Skorupski (yellow card) 90+6'	Stadium: Stadio Arechi; Attendance: 16,650; Referee: Simone Sozza
Note: Fazio was sent off for dissent while a substitute.

17 December 2023 16	Bologna	2–0	Roma	Bologna
18:00 CET (UTC+1)	Saelemaekers (yellow card) 9'; Beukema (yellow card) 33'; Moro 37'; Ferguson (yellow card) 45+1'; Kristensen 49' (o.g.); Freuler (yellow card) 66'	Report	Llorente (yellow card) 10'; Pellegrini (yellow card) 36'; Paredes (yellow card) 66'; Bove (yellow card) 72'	Stadium: Stadio Renato Dall'Ara; Attendance: 25,579; Referee: Marco Guida

23 December 2023 17	Bologna	1–0	Atalanta	Bologna
15:00 CET (UTC+1)	Posch (yellow card) 30'; Freuler (yellow card) 70'; Ferguson 86'	Report	De Roon (yellow card) 69'; Zappacosta (yellow card) 79'; Hateboer (yellow card) 88'; Scamacca (yellow card) 90+5'	Stadium: Stadio Renato Dall'Ara; Attendance: 28,082; Referee: Antonio Rapuano

30 December 2023 18	Udinese	3–0	Bologna	Udine
15:00 CET (UTC+1)	Pereyra 23', (yellow card) 45+2'; Lucca 48'; Payero 52'; Success (yellow card) 90+2'	Report	Urbański (yellow card) 6'; Ferguson (yellow card) 45+3'; Freuler (yellow card) 63'; Zirkzee (yellow card) 72'; Fabbian (yellow card) 75'	Stadium: Stadio Friuli; Attendance: 25,144; Referee: Daniele Orsato

5 January 2024 19	Bologna	1–1	Genoa	Bologna
20:45 CET (UTC+1)	Posch (yellow card) 19'; Zirkzee (yellow card) 88'; De Silvestri 90+5'; Kristiansen (yellow card) 90+7'	Report	Guðmundsson 20'; Vásquez (yellow card) 40'; Retegui (yellow card) 71'; Sabelli (yellow card) 79'; Fabbian (yellow card) 75'	Stadium: Stadio Renato Dall'Ara; Attendance: 25,095; Referee: Andrea Colombo

14 January 2024 20	Cagliari	2–1	Bologna	Cagliari
15:00 CET (UTC+1)	Petagna 31'; Nández (yellow card) 45+2'; Dossena (yellow card) 45+2'; Calafiori 69' (o.g.); Wieteska (yellow card) 90'	Report	Posch (yellow card) 3'; Orsolini 24'; Calafiori (yellow card) 88'	Stadium: Unipol Domus; Attendance: 15,980; Referee: Gianluca Manganiello

27 January 2024 22	Milan	2–2	Bologna	Milan
20:45 CET (UTC+1)	Leão (yellow card) 22'; Calabria (yellow card) 36'; Giroud (penalty missed) 42'; Adli (yellow card) 44'; Loftus-Cheek 45', 83', (yellow card) 45+2'; Hernandez (penalty missed) 74'; Terracciano (yellow card) 90+1'	Report	Calafiori (yellow card) 2'; Zirkzee 29'; Ferguson (yellow card) 29'; Urbański (yellow card) 57'; Orsolini 90+2' (pen.)	Stadium: San Siro; Attendance: 71,334; Referee: Davide Massa

3 February 2024 23	Bologna	4–2	Sassuolo	Bologna
20:45 CET (UTC+1)	Viti 24' (o.g.); Aebischer (yellow card) 55'; Fabbian 73'; Ferguson 83'; Saelemaekers 86'	Report	Thorstvedt 13', (yellow card) 45+1'; Volpato 34'; Boloca (yellow card) 85'; Doig (yellow card) 90+3'	Stadium: Stadio Renato Dall'Ara; Attendance: 20,932; Referee: Juan Luca Sacchi

11 February 2024 24	Bologna	4–0	Lecce	Bologna
15:00 CET (UTC+1)	Beukema 5'; Orsolini 27', 49'; Calafiori (yellow card) 34'; Odgaard 82'	Report	Almqvist (yellow card) 41'; Oudin (yellow card) 75'	Stadium: Stadio Renato Dall'Ara; Attendance: 24,658; Referee: Gianluca Manganiello

14 February 2024 21	Bologna	2–0	Fiorentina	Bologna
19:00 CET (UTC+1)	Orsolini 12'; Freuler (yellow card) 59'; Posch (yellow card) 90+2'; Odgaard 90+5'	Report	Milenković (yellow card) 35'; Biraghi (yellow card) 90+2'; Beltrán (yellow card) 90+7'	Stadium: Stadio Renato Dall'Ara; Attendance: 25,684; Referee: Daniele Chiffi
Note: The match was originally scheduled for 21 January 2024, but was postponed due to Fiorentina's participation in the 2023 Supercoppa Italiana.

18 February 2024 25	Lazio	1–2	Bologna	Rome
12:30 CET (UTC+1)	Isaksen 18'; Cataldi (yellow card) 35'; Marušić (yellow card) 79'	Report	Fabbian (yellow card) 25'; El Azzouzi 39', (yellow card) 46'; Zirkzee 78'; Aebischer (yellow card) 90+3'	Stadium: Stadio Olimpico; Attendance: 40,000; Referee: Fabio Maresca

23 February 2024 26	Bologna	2–0	Hellas Verona	Bologna
20:45 CET (UTC+1)	Freuler (yellow card) 20', (goal) 65'; Fabbian 27'; Ferguson (yellow card) 69'	Report	Duda (yellow card) 45+6'; Cabal (yellow card) 79'	Stadium: Stadio Renato Dall'Ara; Attendance: 26,033; Referee: Rosario Abisso

3 March 2024 27	Atalanta	1–2	Bologna	Bergamo
18:00 CET (UTC+1)	Koopmeiners (yellow card) 14'; Lookman 28'; Holm (yellow card) 64'; Éderson (yellow card) 69'	Report	Posch (yellow card) 6'; Zirkzee 57' (pen.); Ferguson 61'; Odgaard (yellow card) 90+5'	Stadium: Gewiss Stadium; Attendance: 14,931; Referee: Federico La Penna

9 March 2024 28	Bologna	0–1	Internazionale	Bologna
18:00 CET (UTC+1)	Zirkzee (yellow card) 25'; Freuler (yellow card) 47'	Report	Bisseck 37'; Klaassen (yellow card) 81'	Stadium: Stadio Renato Dall'Ara; Attendance: 30,204; Referee: Luca Pairetto

15 March 2024 29	Empoli	0–1	Bologna	Empoli
20:45 CET (UTC+1)	Luperto (yellow card) 28'; Pezzella (yellow card) 30'; Maleh (yellow card) 90+6'	Report	Fabbian 90+4'; Freuler (yellow card) 90+7'	Stadium: Stadio Carlo Castellani; Attendance: 11,185; Referee: Michael Fabbri

1 April 2024 30	Bologna	3–0	Salernitana	Bologna
12:30 CEST (UTC+2)	Orsolini 14'; Saelemaekers 44'; Lykogiannis 90+2'	Report	Pierozzi (yellow card) 17'; Candreva (yellow card) 45+1'; Tchaouna (yellow card) 77'	Stadium: Stadio Renato Dall'Ara; Attendance: 27,255; Referee: Ermanno Feliciani

7 April 2024 31	Frosinone	0–0	Bologna	Frosinone
12:30 CEST (UTC+2)	Romagnoli (yellow card) 43'	Report	Saelemaekers (yellow card) 12'; Kristiansen (yellow card) 71'; Lykogiannis (yellow card) 89'	Stadium: Stadio Benito Stirpe; Attendance: 14,896; Referee: Daniele Orsato

13 April 2024 32	Bologna	0–0	Monza	Bologna
20:45 CEST (UTC+2)	Orsolini (yellow card) 5'; Ferguson (yellow card) 33'; Beukema (yellow card) 74'; Ndoye (yellow card) 90+4'	Report	Akpa Akpro (yellow card) 19'; Izzo (yellow card) 36'; Bondo (yellow card) 80'; Birindelli (yellow card) 87'	Stadium: Stadio Renato Dall'Ara; Attendance: 26,903; Referee: Federico La Penna

22 April 2024 33	Roma	1–3	Bologna	Rome
18:30 CEST (UTC+2)	Paredes (yellow card) 6'; Angeliño (yellow card) 13'; Pellegrini (yellow card) 33'; El Shaarawy (yellow card) 40'; Azmoun 56'; Llorente (yellow card) 63'	Report	Zirkzee (yellow card) 6', (goal) 45'; El Azzouzi 14'; Freuler (yellow card) 64'; Saelemaekers 65'	Stadium: Stadio Olimpico; Attendance: 63,850; Referee: Fabio Maresca

28 April 2024 34	Bologna	1–1	Udinese	Bologna
15:00 CEST (UTC+2)	Beukema (yellow card) 55' (yellow-red card) 64'; Zirkzee (yellow card) 75'; Saelemaekers 78'	Report	Ehizibue (yellow card) 42'; Payero 45+1', (yellow card) 82'; Okoye (yellow card) 50'; Lucca (yellow card) 53'; Pérez (yellow card) 68'; Davis (yellow card) 89'; Ferreira (yellow card) 90+2'	Stadium: Stadio Renato Dall'Ara; Attendance: 27,396; Referee: Juan Luca Sacchi

3 May 2024 35	Torino	0–0	Bologna	Turin
20:45 CEST (UTC+2)	Vojvoda (yellow card) 8'; Rodriguez (yellow card) 50'	Report	Fabbian (yellow card) 13'; Aebischer (yellow card) 52'	Stadium: Stadio Olimpico Grande Torino; Attendance: 23,895; Referee: Simone Sozza

11 May 2024 36	Napoli	0–2	Bologna	Naples
18:00 CEST (UTC+2)	Politano (penalty missed) 21'; Kvaratskhelia (yellow card) 33'; Cajuste (yellow card) 47'	Report	Ndoye 9'; Posch 12'; Lucumí (yellow card) 71'	Stadium: Stadio Diego Armando Maradona; Attendance: 43,000; Referee: Luca Pairetto

20 May 2024 37	Bologna	3–3	Juventus	Bologna
20:45 CEST (UTC+2)	Calafiori 2', 53'; Castro 4'; Aebischer (yellow card) 82'	Report	Miretti (yellow card) 26'; Cambiaso (yellow card) 29'; Danilo (yellow card) 62'; Bremer (yellow card) 68'; Chiesa 76'; Milik 83'; Yıldız 84'; Fagioli (yellow card) 90'	Stadium: Stadio Renato Dall'Ara; Attendance: 29,603; Referee: Giovanni Ayroldi

24 May 2024 38	Genoa	2–0	Bologna	Genoa
20:45 CEST (UTC+2)	Malinovskyi 13'; Vitinha 59'; Leali (yellow card) 67'	Report	El Azzouzi (yellow card) 56'; Castro (yellow card) 64'	Stadium: Stadio Luigi Ferraris; Attendance: 32,255; Referee: Alberto Santoro

=== Coppa Italia ===
11 August 2023 Round of 64	Bologna	2–0	Cesena	Bologna
21:15 CEST (UTC+2)	Corazza 2'; Zirkzee 80'	Report	Adamo (yellow card) 37'	Stadium: Stadio Renato Dall'Ara; Attendance: 14,139; Referee: Gianluca Manganiello

31 October 2023 Round of 32	Bologna	2–0	Hellas Verona	Bologna
21:00 CET (UTC+1)	Moro 41'; Van Hooijdonk 62'	Report	Amione (yellow card) 39'; Serdar (yellow card) 45+1', (red card) 73'	Stadium: Stadio Renato Dall'Ara; Attendance: 11,593; Referee: Federico Dionisi

20 December 2023 Round of 16	Internazionale	1–2 (a.e.t.)	Bologna	Milan
21:00 CET (UTC+1)	Martínez (penalty missed) 65'; Bisseck (yellow card) 90+5'; Carlos Augusto 92'; Darmian (yellow card) 100'; Pavard (yellow card) 103'; Barella (yellow card) 109'	Report	Lykogiannis (yellow card) 41'; Van Hooijdonk (yellow card) 58'; Fabbian (yellow card) 88'; Beukema 112'; Ndoye 116'	Stadium: San Siro; Attendance: 60,334; Referee: Federico La Penna

9 January 2024 Quarter-finals	Fiorentina	0–0 (a.e.t.) (5–4 p)	Bologna	Florence
21:00 CET (UTC+1)	Bonaventura (yellow card) 116'	Report	Ferguson (yellow card) 89'; Saelemaekers (yellow card) 109'	Stadium: Stadio Artemio Franchi; Attendance: 25,079; Referee: Matteo Marchetti
	Penalties
	Mandragora (penalty scored); Arthur (penalty scored); Milenković (penalty scored); Mina (penalty scored); Lopez (penalty scored)		(penalty scored) Ferguson; (penalty scored) Zirkzee; (penalty scored) Orsolini; (penalty scored) Calafiori; (penalty missed) Posch

== Statistics ==
=== Squad appearances and goals ===
As of 24 May 2024

No.	Pos	Nat	Player	Total		Serie A		Coppa Italia	
No.	Pos	Nat	Player	Apps	Goals	Apps	Goals	Apps	Goals
Goalkeepers
23	GK	(Italy) ITA	Nicola Bagnolini	1	0	0+1	0	0	0
28	GK	(Poland) POL	Łukasz Skorupski	34	0	32	0	2	0
34	GK	(Italy) ITA	Federico Ravaglia	8	0	6	0	2	0
Defenders
3	DF	(Austria) AUT	Stefan Posch	34	1	29+2	1	3	0
4	DF	(Serbia) SRB	Mihajlo Ilić	0	0	0	0	0	0
5	DF	(France) FRA	Adama Soumaoro	0	0	0	0	0	0
15	DF	(Denmark) DEN	Victor Kristiansen	34	0	26+6	0	2	0
16	DF	(Italy) ITA	Tommaso Corazza	12	1	1+8	0	2+1	1
22	DF	(Greece) GRE	Charalampos Lykogiannis	25	2	10+12	2	1+2	0
26	DF	(Colombia) COL	Jhon Lucumí	31	0	23+6	0	2	0
29	DF	(Italy) ITA	Lorenzo De Silvestri	17	2	7+8	2	0+2	0
31	DF	(Netherlands) NED	Sam Beukema	33	2	29+1	1	3	1
33	DF	(Italy) ITA	Riccardo Calafiori	33	2	26+4	2	1+2	0
Midfielders
6	MF	(Croatia) CRO	Nikola Moro	27	2	10+13	1	3+1	1
8	MF	(Switzerland) SUI	Remo Freuler	34	1	30+2	1	1+1	0
17	MF	(Morocco) MAR	Oussama El Azzouzi	20	2	5+13	2	0+2	0
19	MF	(Scotland) SCO	Lewis Ferguson	33	6	31	6	2	0
20	MF	(Switzerland) SUI	Michel Aebischer	40	0	26+10	0	4	0
56	MF	(Belgium) BEL	Alexis Saelemaekers	32	4	21+9	4	2	0
80	MF	(Italy) ITA	Giovanni Fabbian	29	5	11+16	5	2	0
82	MF	(Poland) POL	Kacper Urbański	25	0	9+13	0	1+2	0
Forwards
7	FW	(Italy) ITA	Riccardo Orsolini	34	10	19+14	10	1	0
9	FW	(Netherlands) NED	Joshua Zirkzee	37	12	32+2	11	1+2	1
10	FW	(Sweden) SWE	Jesper Karlsson	8	0	4+3	0	1	0
11	FW	(Switzerland) SUI	Dan Ndoye	34	2	20+12	1	1+1	1
18	FW	(Argentina) ARG	Santiago Castro	8	1	2+6	1	0	0
21	FW	(Denmark) DEN	Jens Odgaard	10	2	5+5	2	0	0
Players who transferred out during the season
14	DF	(Italy) ITA	Kevin Bonifazi	3	0	1	0	2	0
8	MF	(Argentina) ARG	Nicolás Domínguez	3	0	1+1	0	1	0
25	MF	(Finland) FIN	Niklas Pyyhtiä	1	0	0	0	1	0
10	FW	(Austria) AUT	Marko Arnautović	1	0	0	0	1	0
77	FW	(Netherlands) NED	Sydney van Hooijdonk	11	1	2+7	0	2	1

=== Goalscorers ===
As of match played 18 February 2024

Rank	No.	Pos.	Nat.	Player	Serie A	Coppa Italia	Total
1	9	FW	(Netherlands)	Joshua Zirkzee	11	1	12
2	7	FW	(Italy)	Riccardo Orsolini	10	0	10
3	19	MF	(Scotland)	Lewis Ferguson	6	0	6
4	80	MF	(Italy)	Giovanni Fabbian	5	0	5
5	56	MF	(Belgium)	Alexis Saelemaekers	4	0	4
6	6	MF	(Croatia)	Nikola Moro	1	1	2
6	11	FW	(Switzerland)	Dan Ndoye	1	1	2
6	17	MF	(Morocco)	Oussama El Azzouzi	2	0	2
6	21	FW	(Denmark)	Jens Odgaard	2	0	2
6	22	DF	(Greece)	Charalampos Lykogiannis	2	0	2
6	29	DF	(Italy)	Lorenzo De Silvestri	2	0	2
6	31	DF	(Netherlands)	Sam Beukema	1	1	2
9	3	DF	(Austria)	Stefan Posch	1	0	1
9	8	MF	(Switzerland)	Remo Freuler	1	0	1
9	16	DF	(Italy)	Tommaso Corazza	0	1	1
9	77	FW	(Netherlands)	Sydney van Hooijdonk	0	1	1
Own goals					2	0	2
Totals					51	6	57
