= Pagliuca =

Pagliuca is a surname. Notable people with the surname include:

- Gianluca Pagliuca (born 1966), Italian football coach and former player
- Guido Pagliuca (born 1976), Italian football manager and former player
- Mattia Pagliuca (born 2002), Italian footballer
- Stephen Pagliuca (born 1955), American private equity investor and basketball team co-owner
