= Lewis Ferguson =

Scottish footballer (born 1999)

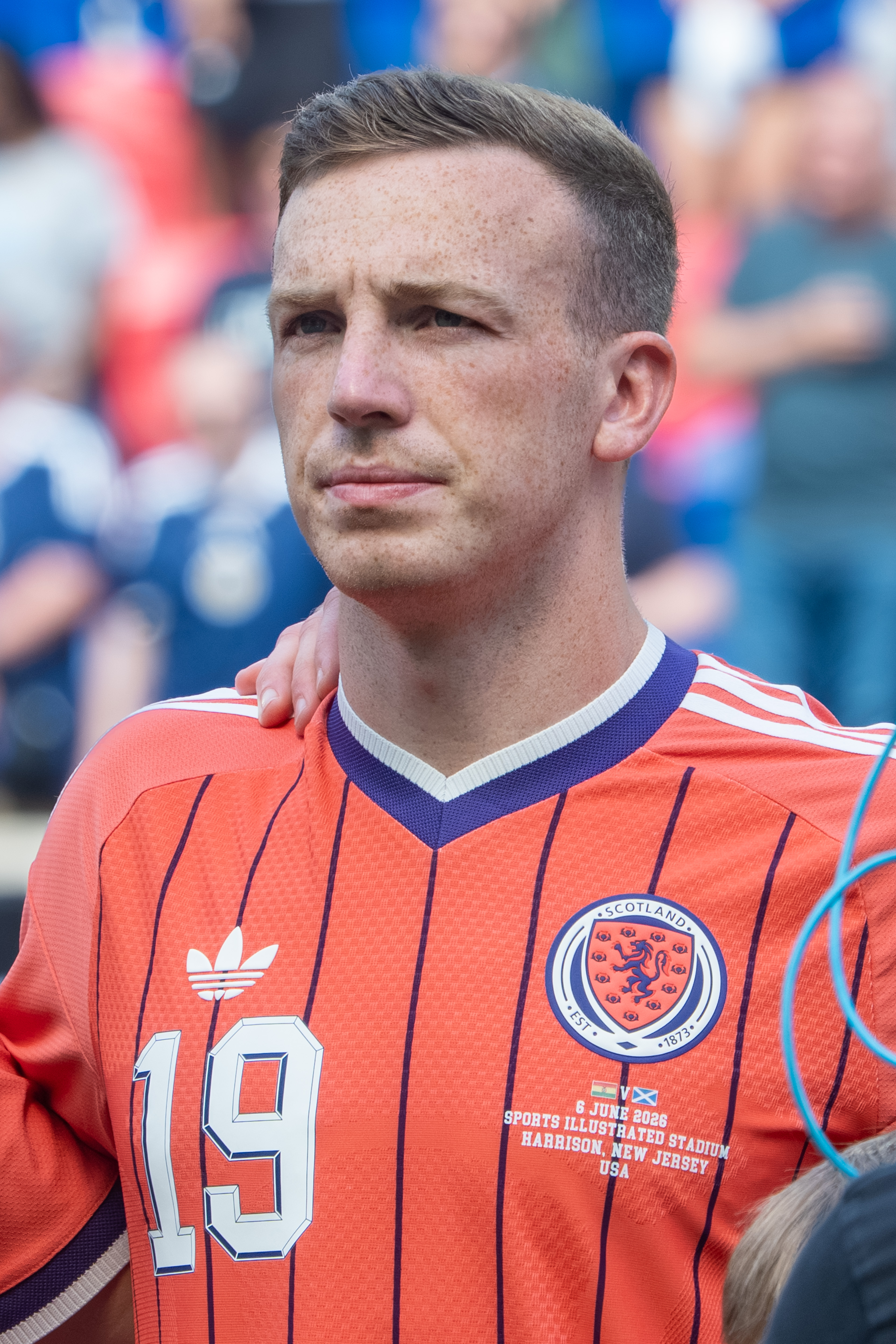
- Ferguson with Scotland in 2026

Personal information
- Full name: Lewis Ferguson
- Date of birth: 24 August 1999 (age 27)
- Place of birth: Hamilton, South Lanarkshire, Scotland
- Height: 6 ft 1 in (1.85 m)
- Position: Midfielder

Team information
- Current team: Bologna
- Number: 19

Youth career
- 2009–2013: Rangers
- 2013–2017: Hamilton Academical

Senior career*
Years	Team	Apps	(Gls)
2017–2018	Hamilton Academical	13	(0)
2018–2022	Aberdeen	132	(27)
2022–	Bologna	115	(15)

International career^{‡}
2017–2018	Scotland U19	7	(0)
2018	Scotland U20	1	(0)
2018–2020	Scotland U21	11	(0)
2021–	Scotland	33	(1)
- * Club domestic league appearances and goals as of 20:03, 28 October 2026 (UTC) ‡ National team caps and goals as of 22:45, 16 November 2026 (UTC)

Lewis Ferguson (born 24 August 1999) is a Scottish professional footballer who plays as an midfielder for Serie A club Bologna, whom he captains, and the Scotland national team.

After playing youth football for Rangers and Hamilton Academical, Ferguson made his senior debut for the latter club in the 2017–18 season. After four seasons with Aberdeen he moved to Italian club Bologna in 2022.

A Scotland youth international, Ferguson made his senior debut in 2021.

== Early life ==
Lewis Ferguson was born on 24 August 1999 in Hamilton, South Lanarkshire.

== Club career ==
=== Hamilton Academical ===
Ferguson is a graduate of the Hamilton Academical youth system after earlier being part of the setup at Rangers. He made his senior debut for Hamilton on 20 January 2018, and became a regular in the team in the latter part of the 2017–18 season, replacing Greg Docherty who had moved to Rangers.

With his contract due to expire at the end of that season, Ferguson signed a pre-contract agreement with Aberdeen in May 2018. He was one of seven first-team players who left Hamilton at the end of the 2017–18 season.

=== Aberdeen ===
Ferguson made his competitive debut for Aberdeen on 26 July 2018, in the first leg of a Europa League tie against Burnley at Pittodrie Stadium. He scored his first senior goal in the second leg at Turf Moor – a "stunning overhead kick" – although Burnley eventually won the tie on aggregate after extra time. On 28 October, he helped Aberdeen to reach the 2018 Scottish League Cup Final by scoring the only goal of the semi-final against Rangers at Hampden Park. By the end of the calendar year, he had also scored three league goals, all in the closing minutes of each fixture, with two of them (a free kick against Kilmarnock and another overhead kick against Livingston) winning the matches for his team.

In February 2019, Ferguson extended his contract with Aberdeen, keeping him at the club until 2024. In April, he played at Hampden Park again, but this time was sent off for a dangerous challenge as Aberdeen lost to Celtic in the semi-final of the 2018–19 Scottish Cup. In May 2019, he was nominated for the season's PFA Scotland Young Player of the Year; the award was won by Ryan Kent.

Ferguson was the club's top scorer during the 2020–21 season, with 10 goals in 41 appearances. Aberdeen rejected an offer from Watford for Ferguson in May 2021, after which he submitted a written transfer request.

=== Bologna ===
On 12 July 2022, Italian club Bologna announced the signing of Ferguson for an undisclosed transfer fee. He made his debut as a substitute in a 2–0 away defeat to Milan on 27 August 2022, and made two more substitute appearances before his first start against Napoli on 16 October. His first goal came a week later, the second in a 2–0 win at home to Lecce, and he scored again the following week – the equaliser in a 2–1 away win over Monza. On 12 November 2022, he scored Bologna's third goal in a 3–0 win over Sassuolo, a curling effort from the edge of the penalty area after a one-two with Nicolás Domínguez that was later named the Serie A goal of the month for November 2022. Ferguson started 28 games for Bologna during the 2022–23 season as they finished ninth in Serie A. He scored seven goals during the season, which was the highest tally by a Scottish player in an Italian league season since Denis Law played for Torino in 1961–62.

In July 2023, Ferguson signed a new contract with Bologna that is due to run until the end of the 2026–27 season. In October 2023 he became Bologna's captain, and he continued in that role, until suffering a knee injury in April 2024. He later said it would be six or seven months before he could re-start training.

Ferguson became the top Scottish goalscorer in Serie A history on 23 December 2023, overtaking Denis Law, when he scored the only goal in a 1–0 win against Atalanta. He was named the Serie A midfielder of the year for the 2023–24 season.

On 29 October 2024, Ferguson was named in a matchday squad for the first time in over six months, remaining on the bench as Bologna beat Cagliari 2–0. He said that "the Scottish mentality" helped him recover from his injury quicker than expected. He made his return to the pitch in Bologna's 1–0 win over Lecce on 2 November, coming on as an 82-minute substitute for Remo Freuler. Later that month, he extended his Bologna contract until 2028 and made his UEFA Champions League debut against Lille, in which he played a full 90 minutes for the first time in over seven months.

Ferguson captained Bologna to their first final in 51 years, beating Empoli 2–1 (5–1 on aggregate), on 30 April 2025 to reach the Coppa Italia final. Ferguson was captain again winning the final 1–0 versus Milan on 14 May 2025. Ferguson emulated Graeme Souness to become the second Scotsman to win the Coppa Italia.

In July 2026, he was linked with a move back to Scotland, to sign for Rangers.

== International career ==
Ferguson was called up by the Scotland under-19 team in August 2017, and he went on to make appearances at the under-19, under-20 and Scotland under-21 levels. Ferguson received his first call-up to the senior Scotland squad in August 2021 for games against Denmark, Moldova and Austria. He made his debut against Denmark on 1 September 2021 in a 2–0 away loss, coming on for Billy Gilmour in added time.

He suffered a knee injury in April 2024 which required surgery and put his participation at Euro 2024 into doubt. After missing the tournament due to injury, he said his "time would come" with the national team. He was recalled by the national team in March 2025.

In October 2025 Ferguson scored his first goal in a full international, the second goal in a 3–1 win against Greece during 2026 FIFA World Cup qualification.

On 19 May 2026, Ferguson was selected in the 26-man squad for the 2026 FIFA World Cup.

== Personal life ==
Lewis is the son of Derek Ferguson and nephew of Barry Ferguson, both former professional footballers with clubs including Rangers, and the Scotland national team. His cousin Kyle Ferguson is also a footballer (they were teammates as children in the Rangers academy).

He and his partner welcomed their first child, a daughter, in November 2022. Another daughter was born in 2025.

== Career statistics ==
=== Club ===
As of match played 28 October 2026

Appearances and goals by club, season and competition
Club	Season	League			National cup (Note: Includes Scottish Cup, Coppa Italia)		League cup (Note: Includes Scottish League Cup)		Europe		Other		Total	
Club	Season	Division	Apps	Goals	Apps	Goals	Apps	Goals	Apps	Goals	Apps	Goals	Apps	Goals
Hamilton Academical U20s	2016–17	—			—		—		—		1 (Note: Appearance in Scottish Challenge Cup)	0	1	0
Hamilton Academical U20s	2017–18	—			—		—		—		1	0	1	0
Hamilton Academical U20s	Total		—		—		—		—		2	0	2	0
Hamilton Academical	2017–18	Scottish Premiership	13	0	1	0	0	0	—		—		14	0
Aberdeen	2018–19	Scottish Premiership	33	6	6	0	3	1	2 (Note: Appearances in UEFA Europa League)	1	—		44	8
Aberdeen	2019–20	Scottish Premiership	28	1	4	1	1	0	6	1	—		39	3
Aberdeen	2020–21	Scottish Premiership	35	9	3	0	0	0	3	1	—		41	10
Aberdeen	2021–22	Scottish Premiership	36	11	2	1	1	0	6 (Note: Appearances in UEFA Europa Conference League)	4	—		45	16
Aberdeen	Total		132	27	15	2	5	1	17	7	—		169	37
Bologna	2022–23	Serie A	32	7	1	0	—		—		—		33	7
Bologna	2023–24	Serie A	31	6	2	0	—		—		—		33	6
Bologna	2024–25	Serie A	16	1	3	0	—		5 (Note: Appearances in UEFA Champions League)	0	—		24	1
Bologna	2025–26	Serie A	27	1	2	0	—		14	0	2 (Note: Appearances in Supercoppa Italiana)	0	45	1
Bologna	2026–27	Serie A	9	0	0	0	—		—		—		9	0
Bologna	Total		115	15	8	0	—		19	0	2	0	144	15
Career total			260	42	24	2	5	1	36	7	4	0	329	52

=== International ===
As of match played 16 November 2026

Appearances and goals by national team and year
National team	Year	Apps	Goals
Scotland	2021	2	0
Scotland	2022	3	0
Scotland	2023	5	0
Scotland	2024	2	0
Scotland	2025	9	1
Scotland	2026	12	0
Total		33	1

Scores and results list Scotland's goal tally first, score column indicates score after each Ferguson goal.

List of international goals scored by Lewis Ferguson
No.	Date	Venue	Opponent	Score	Result	Competition	Ref
1	9 October 2025	Hampden Park, Glasgow, Scotland	Greece	2–1	3–1	2026 FIFA World Cup qualification	

== Honours ==
Bologna

- Coppa Italia: 2024–25

Individual

- SFWA Young Player of the Year: 2019–20
- Serie A Goal of the Month: November 2022
- Premio Bulgarelli Number 8: 2023–24
