= Dan Ndoye =

Swiss footballer (born 2000)

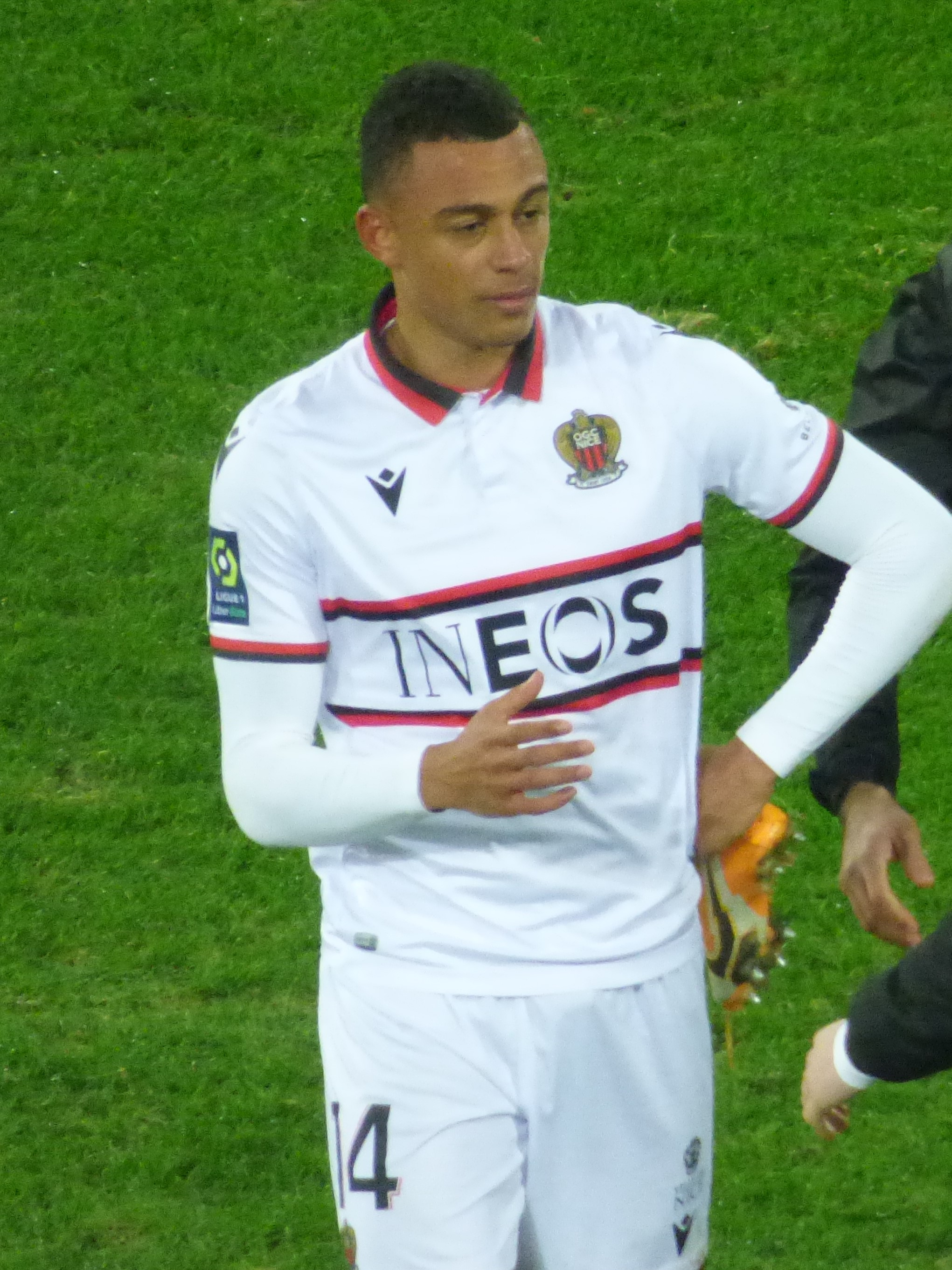
- Ndoye playing for Nice in 2021

Personal information
- Full name: Dan Assane Ndoye
- Date of birth: 25 October 2000 (age 26)
- Place of birth: Nyon, Switzerland
- Height: 1.83 m (6 ft 0 in)
- Position: Winger

Team information
- Current team: Nottingham Forest
- Number: 14

Youth career
- FC La Côte Sports
- Lausanne-Sport

Senior career*
| Years | Team | Apps | (Gls) |
| 2018–2019 | Lausanne-Sport II | 21 | (7) |
| 2018–2020 | Lausanne-Sport | 33 | (8) |
| 2020–2022 | Nice | 31 | (1) |
| 2020 | → Lausanne-Sport (loan) | 12 | (3) |
| 2021–2022 | → Basel (loan) | 29 | (2) |
| 2022–2023 | Basel | 34 | (5) |
| 2023–2025 | Bologna | 62 | (9) |
| 2025– | Nottingham Forest | 33 | (3) |

International career^{‡}
| 2017 | Switzerland U18 | 2 | (0) |
| 2018 | Switzerland U19 | 10 | (3) |
| 2019–2023 | Switzerland U21 | 26 | (10) |
| 2022– | Switzerland | 42 | (12) |
- * Club domestic league appearances and goals as of 17:01, 31 October 2026 (UTC) ‡ National team caps and goals as of 23:45, 13 November 2026 (UTC)

Dan Assane Ndoye (born 25 October 2000) is a Swiss professional footballer who plays as a winger for Premier League club Nottingham Forest and the Switzerland national team.

== Club career ==
Born in Nyon, to a Swiss mother and a Senegalese-French father, he started playing football in Switzerland. Ndoye was also eligible to play for France at the international level, as he holds French citizenship.

=== Lausanne-Sport ===
Ndoye started playing football in the youth academy of FC Lausanne-Sport (Team Vaud) at a very young age, first at its local base in his hometown Nyon, then in Lausanne itself. Rising through the ranks at an impressive speed, he made his first steps with the U18s at the age of 15. He played 38 games and scored 23 goals in total for the U17 and U18s. Performances that allowed him to join Team Vaud U21, the reserve team of Lausanne-Sport, at the age of 17. Playing in the 4th Swiss division, he scored 7 goals in 21 games.

In the second half of the season 2018–19 season, he made his professional debut against FC Vaduz on 8 February 2019, then scored his first goal for Lausanne 5 days later, against SC Kriens. In 15 matches, he scored 6 goals and quickly established himself as a key player.

=== Nice ===
On 27 January 2020, Ligue 1 club OGC Nice confirmed that Ndoye had signed with the club, but would remain at Lausanne on loan for the rest of the 2019–20 season.

=== Basel ===
On 31 August 2021, Ndoye completed a move to Basel on a one-year-loan and joined Basel's first team during their 2021–22 season under head coach Patrick Rahmen. Ndoye played his domestic league debut for the club in the away game in the Cornaredo on 12 September as Basel played a 1–1 draw with Lugano. He scored his first goal for the team in the home game in the St. Jakob-Park on 30 September. This was the game in the group stage of the 2021–22 Europa Conference League as Basel won 4–2 against Kairat Almaty. Ndoye scored his first league goal for his new club on 30 October in the away game in the Letzigrund as Basel played a 3–3 draw against Zürich.

On 4 February 2022, Basel exercised the purchase option in their loan contract and signed Ndoye on a permanent basis with a four-and-a-half-year contract until the summer of 2026.

=== Bologna ===
On 14 August 2023, Ndoye signed for Serie A club Bologna alongside Basel teammate Riccardo Calafiori while deals were done separately. Later that year, on 20 December, he scored his first goal in a 2–1 away victory over Inter Milan after extra time in the Coppa Italia round of 16. On 14 May 2025, he scored the decisive goal in a 1–0 win over Milan in the Coppa Italia final, securing his club's first title in the competition in 51 years.

=== Nottingham Forest ===
On 31 July 2025, Ndoye signed for Premier League club Nottingham Forest on a five-year deal for a reported £34 million fee. On 17 August, Ndoye scored on his Premier League debut for Forest in a 3–1 home victory over Brentford in their season opener.

== International career ==
Ndoye represented Switzerland at under-18, under-19 and under-21 level. He played at both the 2021 and 2023 UEFA European Under-21 Championships.

Ndoye made his debut for the Switzerland senior team on 24 September 2022 in a UEFA Nations League fixture against Spain.

After appearing six times during the qualifying campaign, Ndoye was named in Switzerland's squad for the UEFA Euro 2024 finals in June 2024. He started the team's opening match, playing 86 minutes of a 3–1 win over Hungary. On 23 June, he scored his first international goal in a 1–1 draw against Germany in the team's final Group A match, a result which ensured the Swiss team would progress to the knockout stage. As Silvan Widmer was suspended for Switzerland's round of 16 match against Italy, Ndoye moved from attack to right wing-back. He played 77 minutes before being substituted for Vincent Sierro in the 2–0 win which knocked out the defending champions. He continued to play at wing-back in the quarter-final against England, playing the 90 minutes of regulation time and the first eight minutes of extra time before being substituted for Denis Zakaria in the eventual penalty shootout defeat.

On 20 May 2026, Ndoye was selected in the 26-man squad for the 2026 FIFA World Cup. He netted his first World Cup goal in a 2–0 victory over Algeria in the round of 32. In the quarter-final against Argentina, he scored the equalizing goal in a match that ended in a 3–1 defeat after extra time, following his team being reduced to 10 men.

== Career statistics ==
=== Club ===
As of match played 31 October 2026

Appearances and goals by club, season and competition
| Club | Season | League | | | National cup (Note: Includes Swiss Cup, Coupe de France, Coppa Italia, FA Cup) | | League cup (Note: Includes EFL Cup) | | Europe | | Total | |
| Club | Season | Division | Apps | Goals | Apps | Goals | Apps | Goals | Apps | Goals | Apps | Goals |
|---|---|---|---|---|---|---|---|---|---|---|---|---|
| Lausanne-Sport | 2018–19 | Swiss Challenge League | 15 | 6 | 0 | 0 | – | | – | | 15 | 6 |
| Lausanne-Sport | 2019–20 | Swiss Challenge League | 30 | 4 | 4 | 2 | – | | – | | 34 | 6 |
| Lausanne-Sport | Total | | 45 | 10 | 4 | 2 | – | | – | | 49 | 12 |
| Nice | 2020–21 | Ligue 1 | 28 | 1 | 1 | 0 | – | | 5 (Note: Appearances in UEFA Europa League) | 2 | 34 | 3 |
| Nice | 2021–22 | Ligue 1 | 3 | 0 | — | | – | | – | | 3 | 0 |
| Nice | Total | | 31 | 1 | 1 | 0 | – | | 5 | 2 | 37 | 3 |
| Basel (loan) | 2021–22 | Swiss Super League | 29 | 2 | 2 | 0 | – | | 8 (Note: Appearances in UEFA Europa Conference League) | 2 | 39 | 4 |
| Basel | 2022–23 | Swiss Super League | 32 | 4 | 3 | 2 | – | | 19 | 1 | 54 | 7 |
| Basel | 2023–24 | Swiss Super League | 2 | 1 | – | | – | | 2 | 0 | 4 | 1 |
| Basel | Basel total | | 63 | 7 | 5 | 2 | – | | 29 | 3 | 97 | 12 |
| Bologna | 2023–24 | Serie A | 32 | 1 | 2 | 1 | – | | – | | 34 | 2 |
| Bologna | 2024–25 | Serie A | 30 | 8 | 3 | 1 | – | | 8 (Note: Appearances in UEFA Champions League) | 0 | 41 | 9 |
| Bologna | Total | | 62 | 9 | 5 | 2 | – | | 8 | 0 | 75 | 11 |
| Nottingham Forest | 2025–26 | Premier League | 24 | 1 | 1 | 0 | 0 | 0 | 12 | 1 | 37 | 2 |
| Nottingham Forest | 2026–27 | Premier League | 9 | 2 | 0 | 0 | 1 | 0 | — | | 10 | 2 |
| Nottingham Forest | Total | | 33 | 3 | 1 | 0 | 1 | 0 | 12 | 1 | 47 | 4 |
| Career total | | | 234 | 30 | 16 | 6 | 1 | 0 | 54 | 6 | 305 | 42 |

=== International ===
As of match played 13 November 2026

Appearances and goals by national team and year
| National team | Year | Apps | Goals |
|---|---|---|---|
| Switzerland | 2022 | 1 | 0 |
| Switzerland | 2023 | 6 | 0 |
| Switzerland | 2024 | 11 | 1 |
| Switzerland | 2025 | 9 | 4 |
| Switzerland | 2026 | 15 | 7 |
| Total | | 42 | 12 |

Scores and results list Switzerland's goal tally first, score column indicates score after each Ndoye goal.

List of international goals scored by Dan Ndoye
| No. | Date | Venue | Cap | Opponent | Score | Result | Competition |
|---|---|---|---|---|---|---|---|
| 1 | 23 June 2024 | Waldstadion, Frankfurt, Germany | 14 | Germany | 1–0 | 1–1 | UEFA Euro 2024 |
| 2 | 7 June 2025 | Rice–Eccles Stadium, Salt Lake City, United States | 21 | Mexico | 3–1 | 4–2 | Friendly |
| 3 | 10 June 2025 | Geodis Park, Nashville, United States | 22 | United States | 1–0 | 4–0 | Friendly |
| 4 | 8 September 2025 | St. Jakob-Park, Basel, Switzerland | 24 | Slovenia | 3–0 | 3–0 | 2026 FIFA World Cup qualification |
| 5 | 15 November 2025 | Stade de Genève, Geneva, Switzerland | 27 | Sweden | 3–1 | 4–1 | 2026 FIFA World Cup qualification |
| 6 | 27 March 2026 | St. Jakob-Park, Basel, Switzerland | 28 | Germany | 1–0 | 3–4 | Friendly |
| 7 | 31 May 2026 | Kybunpark, St. Gallen, Switzerland | 30 | Jordan | 2–0 | 4–1 | Friendly |
| 8 | 6 June 2026 | Snapdragon Stadium, San Diego, United States | 31 | Australia | 1–0 | 1–1 | Friendly |
| 9 | 2 July 2026 | BC Place, Vancouver, Canada | 35 | Algeria | 2–0 | 2–0 | 2026 FIFA World Cup |
| 10 | 11 July 2026 | Arrowhead Stadium, Kansas City, United States | 37 | Argentina | 1–1 | 1–3 (a.e.t.) | 2026 FIFA World Cup |
| 11 | 3 October 2026 | Thermoplan Arena, Lucerne, Switzerland | 40 | Slovenia | 2–1 | 2–1 | 2026–27 UEFA Nations League B |
| 12 | 6 October 2026 | Thermoplan Arena, Lucerne, Switzerland | 41 | North Macedonia | 3–0 | 3–0 | 2026–27 UEFA Nations League B |

== Honours ==
Lausanne-Sport

- Swiss Challenge League: 2019–20

Bologna

- Coppa Italia: 2024–25

Individual

- UEFA Conference League Team of the Season: 2022–23
- Serie A Goal of the Month: April 2025
