= Mikel Amondarain =

Argentine footballer (born 2006)

Personal information
- Full name: Mikel Jesús Amondarain
- Date of birth: 6 January 2005 (age 21)
- Place of birth: General Mansilla, Argentina
- Height: 1.85 m (6 ft 1 in)
- Position: Midfielder

Team information
- Current team: Bologna
- Number: 8

Youth career
- Racing de Bavio
- –2025: Estudiantes

Senior career*
Years	Team	Apps	(Gls)
2024–2026	Estudiantes	29	(2)
2026–	Bologna	3	(0)
- * Club domestic league appearances and goals as of 13 September 2026

Mikel Jesús Amondarain (born 6 January 2005) is an Argentine professional footballer who plays as a midfielder for Serie A club Bologna.

== Early and personal life ==
Amondarain was born on 6 January 2005, as the younger of two siblings in General Mansilla, Argentina, and is of Basque descent through his father, who died in a traffic collision.

== Career ==
As a youth player, Amondarain joined the youth academy of Argentine side Racing de Bavio. Following his stint there, he joined the youth academy of Argentine side Estudiantes at the age of seven and captained the club's reserve team. In 2025, he signed his first professional contract with them.

The same year, he was promoted to their senior team, where he made twenty-nine league appearances and scored two goals and helped them win the 2025 AFA Liga Profesional de Fútbol Clasura. On 26 July 2025, he debuted for them during a 1–0 away win over Racing in the league. On 23 March 2026, he scored his first goal for them during a 5–0 home win over Central Córdoba in the league. During the 2026 season, he was regarded to have established himself as a regular starter while playing for them.

Ahead of the 2026–27 season, he signed for Italian side Bologna. Previously, he received interest from English side Nottingham Forest and Spanish side Betis.

== Style of play ==
Amondarain plays as a midfielder. Right-footed, he is known for his dynamism.

Italian news website Calciomercato.com wrote in 2026 that he "has a long, lean build. He's strong and agile thanks to his slender frame. He doesn't have great speed, but he's still capable of moving well, thanks to his great intuition and positional sense. Furthermore, thanks to his size and excellent jump, he also has excellent aerial ability. A natural right-footer, he has good individual technique, often plays with just two touches, and is adept at managing space, frequently switching play from one side of the pitch to the other with great precision. Some of his best goals have come from long range. He's also a good defensive midfielder: a potentially complete midfielder, with plenty of room for improvement".

== Career statistics ==
As of match played 13 September 2026

Appearances and goals by club, season and competition
Club	Season	League			National cup		Continental		Other		Total	
Club	Season	Division	Apps	Goals	Apps	Goals	Apps	Goals	Apps	Goals	Apps	Goals
Estudiantes	2025	AFA Liga Profesional de Fútbol	13	1	0	0	4 (Note: Appearances in Copa Libertadores)	0	0	0	17	1
Estudiantes	2026	AFA Liga Profesional de Fútbol	16	2	2	1	6	1	—		24	4
Estudiantes	Total		29	3	2	1	10	1	0	0	41	5
Bologna	2026–27	Serie A	3	0	0	0	—		—		3	0
career total			32	3	2	1	10	1	0	0	44	5
