= 2026–27 Bologna FC 1909 season =

Bologna
2026–27 season
- Owner: BFC 1909 Lux SPV S.A. (Saputo)
- Chairman: Joey Saputo
- Head coach: Domenico Tedesco (until 16 September); Raffaele Palladino (from 17 September)
- Stadium: Stadio Renato Dall'Ara
- Serie A: 14th
- Coppa Italia: Round of 16
- Top goalscorer: League: Five players (1 each); All: Five players (1 each)
- Highest home attendance: 28,211 vs Lazio (24 August 2026, Serie A)
- Lowest home attendance: 26,313 vs Sassuolo (6 September 2026, Serie A)
- Biggest win: 1–2 vs Lecce (A) (11 October 2026, Serie A)
- Biggest defeat: 0–1 vs Lazio (H) (24 August 2026, Serie A); 1–0 vs Atalanta (A) (31 August 2026, Serie A); 1–0 vs Napoli (A) (13 September 2026, Serie A)
Home colours	Away colours	Third colours

The 2026–27 season is the 118th season in the history of Bologna Football Club 1909, and the club's twelfth consecutive season in the Serie A. In addition to the domestic league, the club is participating in the Coppa Italia.

== Season summary ==
On 28 May 2026, Vincenzo Italiano and the club mutually termianted their contract. On 2 June 2026, Domenico Tedesco was announced as his replacement, signing a two year contract with the option of a further season.

On 29 May 2026, the club announced that Juan Miranda had signed a two year contract extension with the club.

On 10 June 2026, the club published a list of friendlies for the upcoming pre-season. A further friendly against SC Cambuur was announced for 1 August 2026.

On 16 September 2026, the club announced that they had parted ways with Domenico Tedesco, with Raffaele Palladino taking over the same day.

== Squad ==
No.	Player	Nat.	Position(s)	Date of birth (age)	Signed in	Contract ends	Signed from	Transfer fee	Notes
Goalkeepers
1	Łukasz Skorupski	(Poland)	GK	5 May 1991 (age 35)	2018	2026	(Italy) Roma	€9,000,000	
25	Massimo Pessina	(Italy)	GK	25 December 2007 (age 18)	2025	2029	(Italy) Bologna Primavera	N/A	From Youth system
77	Ukko Happonen	(Finland)	GK	13 March 2007 (age 19)	2026	-	(Italy) Bologna Primavera	N/A	From Youth system
Defenders
2	Emil Holm	(Sweden)	RB / RWB	13 May 2000 (age 26)	2024	2028	(Italy) Spezia	€7,700,000	
3	Arthur Theate	(Belgium)	CB / LB	25 May 2000 (age 26)	2026	2027	(Germany) Eintracht Frankfurt	Free	Loan with option to buy
5	Eivind Helland	(Norway)	CB	25 April 2005 (age 21)	2026	2030	(Norway) Brann	€7,000,000	
14	Torbjørn Heggem	(Norway)	CB / LB	12 January 1999 (age 27)	2025	2029	(England) West Bromwich Albion	€7,500,000	
16	Nicolò Casale	(Italy)	CB	14 February 1998 (age 28)	2025	2028	(Italy) Lazio	€6,500,000	
20	Nadir Zortea	(Italy)	RB / RWB	19 June 1999 (age 27)	2025	2029	(Italy) Cagliari	€7,500,000	
23	Rahim Alhassane	(Niger)	LB / CB	1 January 2002 (age 24)	2026	2030	(Spain) Real Oviedo	€3,500,000	
29	Lorenzo De Silvestri (captain)	(Italy)	RB / RWB	23 May 1988 (age 38)	2020	2026	(Italy) Torino	Free	
33	Juan Miranda	(Spain)	LB	19 May 2000 (age 26)	2024	2027	(Spain) Real Betis	Free	
36	Matteo Darmian	(Italy)	RB / RWB / CB	2 December 1989 (age 36)	2026	2027	Unattached	Free	
41	Martin Vitík	(Czech Republic)	CB	23 January 2003 (age 23)	2025	2029	(Czech Republic) Sparta Prague	€11,000,000	
Midfielders
4	Tommaso Pobega	(Italy)	CM / DM	15 July 1999 (age 27)	2026	2028	(Italy) Milan	€7,000,000	
6	Nikola Moro	(Croatia)	DM / CM	18 September 1998 (age 28)	2023	2027	(Russia) Dynamo Moscow	€20,000,000	
8	Mikel Amondarain	(Argentina)	CM / DM	6 January 2005 (age 21)	2026	2031	(Argentina) Estudiantes de La Plata	€10,000,000	
17	Oussama El Azzouzi	(Morocco)	DM / CM	29 May 2001 (age 25)	2023	2027	(Belgium) Union Saint-Gilloise	€2,300,000	
18	Marco Libra	(Venezuela)	CM / AM	21 March 2008 (age 18)	2026	-	(Italy) Bologna Primavera	N/A	From Youth system
19	Lewis Ferguson	(Scotland)	CM / AM	24 August 1998 (age 28)	2022	2028	(Scotland) Aberdeen	€2,000,000	
21	Jens Odgaard	(Denmark)	AM / RW / ST	31 March 1999 (age 27)	2024	2027	(Netherlands) AZ	€4,280,000	
Forwards
7	Riccardo Orsolini	(Italy)	RW	24 January 1997 (age 29)	2019	2031	(Italy) Juventus	€15,000,000	
9	Artem Dovbyk	(Ukraine)	CF	21 June 1997 (age 29)	2026	2027	(Italy) Roma	€3,000,000	Loan with option to buy
10	Federico Bernardeschi	(Italy)	RW / AM	16 February 1994 (age 32)	2025	2027	(Canada) Toronto FC	Free	
11	Samuel Mbangula	(Belgium)	LW	16 January 2004 (age 22)	2026	2027	(Germany) Werder Bremen	€2,000,000	Loan with an obligation to buy
22	Jay Enem	(Netherlands)	CF	11 March 2003 (age 23)	2026	2030	(Serbia) Red Star Belgrade	€6,000,000	
28	Nicolò Cambiaghi	(Italy)	LW / SS	28 December 2000 (age 25)	2024	2029	(Italy) Atalanta	€10,000,000	
91	Roberto Piccoli	(Italy)	CF	27 January 2001 (age 25)	2026	2027	(Italy) Fiorentina	Free	Loan with an obligation to buy

== Transfers ==
=== Summer window ===
==== In ====
Date	Pos.	Player	From	Fee	Notes	Ref.
1 July 2026	MF	(Italy) Tommaso Pobega	(Italy) AC Milan	€7,000,000	From loan to definitive purchase	
1 July 2026	FW	(Italy) Luigi Caccavo	(Italy) Lumezzane	€300,000		
20 July 2026	DF	(Niger) Rahim Alhassane	(Spain) Real Oviedo	€3,500,000	+ €500,000 in add-ons	
29 July 2026	MF	(Argentina) Mikel Amondarain	(Argentina) Estudiantes de La Plata	€10,000,000	+ €2,000,000 in add-ons	
1 September 2026	MF	(Italy) Federico Cassa	(Italy) Atalanta Under-23	Undisclosed		
1 September 2026	FW	(Netherlands) Jay Enem	(Serbia) Red Star Belgrade	€6,000,000	+ €500,000 in add-ons	
8 October 2026	DF	(Italy) Matteo Darmian	Unattached	Free		

==== Loans in ====
Date	Pos.	Player	From	Fee	Notes	Ref.
30 July 2026	FW	(Ukraine) Artem Dovbyk	(Italy) Roma	€3,000,000	Option to buy for €17,000,000	
13 August 2026	FW	(Italy) Roberto Piccoli	(Italy) Fiorentina	Free	Obligation to buy for €18,000,000 under certain conditions	
30 August 2026	DF	(Belgium) Arthur Theate	(Germany) Eintracht Frankfurt	€1,000,000	Option to buy for €15,000,000	
1 September 2026	FW	(Belgium) Samuel Mbangula	(Germany) Werder Bremen	€2,000,000	Option to buy for €12,500,000	

==== Out ====
Date	Pos.	Player	To	Fee	Notes	Ref.
1 July 2026	GK	(Italy) Davide Franzini	Unattached	Free	End of contract	
1 July 2026	DF	(Italy) Kevin Bonifazi	Unattached	Free	End of contract	
1 July 2026	DF	(Greece) Charalampos Lykogiannis	(Greece) AEK Athens	Free	End of contract	
1 July 2026	MF	(Switzerland) Michel Aebischer	(Italy) Pisa	€4,500,000	Loan made permanent transfer	
1 July 2026	MF	(Italy) Elia Barbaro	Unattached	Free	End of contract	
1 July 2026	MF	(Italy) Giovanni Fabbian	(Italy) Fiorentina	€13,000,000	Loan made permanent transfer	
1 July 2026	MF	(Switzerland) Remo Freuler	(Greece) Olympiacos	Free	End of contract	
1 July 2026	FW	(Nigeria) Orji Okwonkwo	Unattached	Free	End of contract	
14 July 2026	FW	(Italy) Giuseppe Battimelli	(Italy) Lecco	Free		
15 July 2026	DF	(Italy) Mattia Motolese	(Italy) Virtus Entella	Undisclosed		
17 July 2026	MF	(Italy) Manuel Rosetti	(Italy) Forlì	Undisclosed		
24 July 2026	MF	(Sweden) Ossian Nordvall	(Sweden) IF Elfsborg	Undisclosed		
30 July 2026	FW	(Argentina) Santiago Castro	(Italy) Roma	€35,000,000	+ €2,000,000 in add-ons	
31 July 2026	GK	(Italy) Federico Ravaglia	(England) Watford	€7,000,000	+ €1,000,000 in add-ons, buy-back option for an undisclosed fee	
17 August 2026	DF	(Colombia) Jhon Lucumí	(Italy) Juventus	€20,100,000	+ €2,000,000 in add-ons	

==== Loans out ====
Date	Pos.	Player	To	Fee	Notes	Ref.
10 June 2026	DF	(Uruguay) Joaquín Sosa	(Chile) Colo-Colo	Undisclosed	Loan extended	
1 July 2026	DF	(Italy) Tommaso Corazza	(Italy) Vicenza	Free		
7 July 2026	DF	(Italy) Wisdom Amey	(Italy) Frosinone	Free		
14 July 2026	FW	(Italy) Tommaso Ebone	(Italy) Lumezzane	Free		
16 July 2026	DF	(Italy) Riccardo Stivanello	(Italy) Südtirol	Free		
16 July 2026	MF	(Finland) Niklas Pyyhtiä	(Italy) Südtirol	Free		
17 July 2026	MF	(Italy) Lorenzo Menegazzo	(Italy) Lumezzane	Free		
17 July 2026	FW	(Italy) Luigi Caccavo	(Italy) Juve Stabia	Free	Option to buy for an undisclosed fee, buy-back option for an undisclosed fee	
7 August 2026	MF	(Bulgaria) Dimitar Papazov	(Italy) Perugia	Free		
13 August 2026	FW	(Argentina) Benja Domínguez	(Italy) Sassuolo	Free	Option to buy for €10,000,000	
14 August 2026	DF	(Serbia) Mihajlo Ilić	(Italy) Cesena	Free		
17 August 2026	FW	(Netherlands) Thijs Dallinga	(Germany) Köln	€1,000,000	Option to buy for €11,000,000	
1 September 2026	MF	(Italy) Federico Cassa	(Italy) Catanzaro	Free		
1 September 2026	FW	(England) Jonathan Rowe	(Italy) Atalanta	€5,000,000	Obligation to buy for €30,000,000 under conditions	

==== Loan returns ====
Date	Pos.	Player	To	Fee	Notes	Ref.
30 June 2026	DF	(Portugal) João Mário	(Italy) Juventus	Free		
30 June 2026	MF	(Switzerland) Simon Sohm	(Italy) Fiorentina	Free	Option to buy not exercised	

== Pre-season ==
18 July 2026 Friendly	Bologna	0–4	Arminia Bielefeld
			Grodowski 8', 14'; Wörl 29'; Bauer 90'

22 July 2026 Friendly	Bologna	1–1	Heidenheim
	Castro 20'		Pieringer 29'

25 July 2026 Friendly	Bologna	2–0	Iraklis
	Rowe 7'; Dallinga 58'

1 August 2026 Friendly	Bologna	3–1	SC Cambuur
	Lo Monaco 21'; Cambiaghi 52'; Odgaard 72'		Vink 59'

8 August 2026 Friendly	Bologna	1–4	Pisa SC
	Dallinga 67'		Canestrelli 22'; Vural 47'; Tommaso Marras 73', 87'

15 August 2026 Friendly	Bologna	0–1	Brighton & Hove Albion	Falmer
			Hinshelwood 59'	Stadium: Falmer Stadium

== Competitions ==
=== Serie A ===
==== League table ====
Pos	Team	Pld	W	D	L	GF	GA	GD	Pts
7	Frosinone	11	6	2	3	24	15	+9	20
8	Napoli	12	5	3	4	19	14	+5	18
9	Bologna	12	5	3	4	17	15	+2	18
10	Genoa	12	5	1	6	13	16	−3	16
11	Cagliari	12	5	1	6	10	17	−7	16

Updated to match(es) played on 22 November 2026. Source: Serie A
Rules for classification: 1) Points; 2) Head-to-head points; 3) Head-to-head goal difference; 4) Goal difference; 5) Goals scored; 6) Drawing of lots.
End-of-season ties on points for 1st or 17th are instead decided by a one- or two-leg play-off, respectively, unless the play-off would involve a UEFA competition finalist (in which case rules 2–6 apply). Rules 2–6 determine home advantage (for 17th, the better-ranked team hosts the second leg); if three or more teams are tied, they also select the two play-off teams.

==== Matches ====
24 August 2026 1	Bologna	0–1	Lazio	Bologna
18:30 CEST (UTC+2)	El Azzouzi (yellow card) 34'; Cambiaghi (yellow card) 41'; Odgaard (yellow card) 84'; Haggem (yellow card) 84'	Report	Floriani Mussolini (yellow card) 22'; Dia (yellow card) 34'; Cancellieri (yellow card) 44'; Frattesi 59'; Provstgaard (yellow card) 90+3'	Stadium: Stadio Renato Dall'Ara; Attendance: 28,211; Referee: Fabio Maresca

31 August 2026 2	Atalanta	1–0	Bologna	Bergamo
20:45 CEST (UTC+2)	Krstović (yellow card) 73'; Samardžić 90+6'	Report		Stadium: New Balance Arena; Attendance: 21,586; Referee: Daniele Doveri

6 September 2026 3	Bologna	2–2	Sassuolo	Stadio Renato Dall'Ara
	Piccoli 50'; Dovbyk 90+1'; Tedesco (red card) 90+4'	Report	Doig 19'; Adžić 56'	Attendance: 26,313; Referee: Marco Di Bello

13 September 2026 4	Napoli	1–0	Bologna	Naples
18:00 CEST (UTC+2)	Lobotka 66'	Report	Amondarain (yellow card) 31'	Stadium: Stadio Diego Armando Maradona; Attendance: 41,000; Referee: Kevin Bonacina

19 September 2026 5	Bologna	1–1	Torino	Stadio Renato Dall'Ara
	Bernardeschi 14'	Report	Kulenović 77'	Attendance: 26,413; Referee: Marco Guida

11 October 2026 6	Lecce	1–2	Bologna	Stadio Via del mare
	Fatah 64'	Report	Orsolini 17'; Enem 75'	Referee: Luca Pairetto

17 October 2026 7	Bologna	1–3	Internazionale	Bologna
18:00 CEST (UTC+2)	Theate (yellow card) 34'; Pobega 10', (yellow card) 57'; Miranda (yellow card) 71'; Bernardeschi (yellow card) 72'	Report	Esposito (yellow card) 35'; Thuram 44', (yellow card) 61'; Carlos Augusto 69', (yellow card) 79'; Bonny 83'	Stadium: Stadio Renato Dall'Ara; Attendance: 31,303; Referee: Daniele Doveri

24 October 2026 8	Cagliari	0–2	Bologna	Unipol Domus
		Report	Casale 57'; Bernardeschi 80' (pen.)	Attendance: 16,161; Referee: Kevin Bonacina

28 October 2026 9	Milan	2–4	Bologna	Milan
18:30 CET (UTC+1)	Cisse 14', 27'	Report	Mbangula 8', 62', 86'; Bartesaghi 60' (o.g.); Pobega (yellow card) 76'; Heggem (yellow card) 84'	Stadium: San Siro; Attendance: 72,825; Referee: Juan Luca Sacchi

31 October 2026 10	Bologna	2–1	AC Monza	Stadio Renato Dall'Ara
	Pobega 33'; Bernardeschi 59' (pen.)	Report	Varela 6' (pen.)	Referee: Andrea Zanotti

7 November 2026 11	Parma	1–2	Bologna	Stadio Ennio Tardini
	Ndiaye (red card) 9'; Sierro 81' (pen.)	Report	Theate 53'; Orsolini 72' (pen.)	Referee: Luca Zufferli

22 November 2026 12	Bologna	1–1	Udinese	Stadio Renato Dall'Ara
	Zortea 43'	Report	Zaniolo 67'	Referee: Livio Marinelli

27 November 2026 13	Venezia FC	v	Bologna

4 December 2026 14	Bologna	v	AS Roma

12 December 2026 15	Como	v	Bologna

19 December 2026 16	Fiorentina	v	Bologna	Florence
--:-- CET (UTC+1)		Report		Stadium: Stadio Artemio Franchi

3 January 2027 17	Bologna	v	Juventus FC

6 January 2027 18	Frisinone	v	Bologna

9 January 2027 19	Bologna	v	Genoa

17 January 2027 20	Lazio	v	Bologna

23 January 2027 21	Bologna	v	Atalanta	Bologna
--:-- CET (UTC+1)		Report		Stadium: Stadio Renato Dall'Ara

31 January 2027 22	Udinese	v	Bologna

7 February 2027 23	Bologna	v	AC Milan

14 February 2027 24	Bologna	v	Como

21 February 2027 25	Juventus FC	v	Bologna

28 February 2027 26	Bologna	v	Lecce

7 March 2027 27	Sassuolo	v	Bologna

14 March 2027 28	Bologna	v	Napoli

21 March 2027 29	Monza	v	Bologna

4 April 2027 30	AS Roma	v	Bologna

11 April 2027 31	Bologna	v	Venezia FC

18 April 2027 32	Bologna	v	Cagliari

25 April 2027 33	Inter Milan	v	Bologna

1 May 2027 34	Bologna	v	Fiorentina	Bologna
--:-- CEST (UTC+2)		Report		Stadium: Stadio Renato Dall'Ara

9 May 2027 35	Torino FC	v	Bologna

16 May 2027 36	v

23 May 2027 37	Genoa CFC	v	Bologna

30 May 2027 38	Bologna	v	Parma

=== Coppa Italia ===
2–16 December 2026	Bologna	v	Palermo	Bologna
--:-- CET		Report		Stadium: Stadio Renato Dall'Ara
