= Marco Libra =

Venezuelan footballer (born 2008)

Personal information
- Full name: Marco Libra Alvarado
- Date of birth: 21 March 2008 (age 18)
- Place of birth: Caracas, Venezuela
- Height: 1.82 m (6 ft 0 in)
- Position: Midfielder

Team information
- Current team: Bologna
- Number: 18

Youth career
- 2021–: Bologna

Senior career*
Years	Team	Apps	(Gls)
2026–	Bologna	2	(0)

International career^{‡}
2025	Venezuela U17	7	(0)
2026–	Venezuela	4	(0)
- * Club domestic league appearances and goals as of 13 September 2026 ‡ National team caps and goals as of 6 October 2026

Marco Libra Alvarado (born 21 March 2008) is a Venezuelan professional footballer who plays as a midfielder for Serie A club Bologna and the Venezuela national team.

== Club career ==
Libra was born in Caracas, Venezuela, and began playing football in his home country before moving to Italy to join the youth academy of Bologna in 2021. He quickly established himself in the Bologna youth ranks, and in the 2024 season, aged 16, was named captain of the club's under-17 side. His performances earned him promotion to the under-18 squad and a debut in the UEFA Youth League, in which he appeared once for a total of 81 minutes.

== International career ==
Libra was born in Venezuela to an Italian father and a Venezuelan mother, and chose to represent Venezuela internationally. With the Venezuela under-17 national team, he featured at the 2025 FIFA U-17 World Cup held in Qatar, playing four matches in the group stage and round of sixteen.

In May 2026, head coach Oswaldo Vizcarrondo called Libra up to the senior Venezuela squad for friendly matches against Turkey and Iraq. He made his senior debut on 6 June 2026, coming on as a substitute in the 79th minute in a 2–1 defeat to Turkey.

== Career statistics ==
=== Club ===
As of match played 13 September 2026

Appearances and goals by club, season and competition
Club	Season	League			Cup		Europe		Other		Total	
Club	Season	Division	Apps	Goals	Apps	Goals	Apps	Goals	Apps	Goals	Apps	Goals
Bologna	2026–27	Serie A	2	0	0	0	—		—		2	0
Career total			2	0	0	0	0	0	0	0	2	0

=== International ===
As of match played 6 October 2026

Appearances and goals by national team and year
National team	Year	Apps	Goals
Venezuela	2026	4	0
Total		4	0
