= Nicola Bagnolini =

Italian footballer (born 2004)

Personal information
- Date of birth: 14 March 2004 (age 22)
- Place of birth: Cesena, Italy
- Height: 1.94 m (6 ft 4 in)
- Position: Goalkeeper

Team information
- Current team: Gubbio (on loan from Bologna)
- Number: 1

Youth career
- 2014–2018: Cesena
- 2018–2021: Bologna

Senior career*
Years	Team	Apps	(Gls)
2022–	Bologna	2	(0)
2025–	→ Gubbio (loan)	18	(0)

International career^{‡}
2021–2022	Italy U18	0	(0)
2022	Italy U19	2	(0)
Medal record
Representing Italy
Mediterranean Games
Runner-up	Oran 2022	U-18 Team
- * Club domestic league appearances and goals as of 30 April 2026 ‡ National team caps and goals as of 19 November 2022

Nicola Bagnolini (born 14 March 2004) is an Italian professional footballer who plays as a goalkeeper for Serie C Group B club Gubbio, on loan from Bologna.

== Club career ==
Bagnolini first started playing football by joining the academy of Cesena, aged 10, before moving to Bologna in 2018. He signed his first professional contract with Bologna in December 2020, and then worked his way up their youth categories, subsequently making his professional debut for the club on 21 May 2022, as he came on as a late substitute for Francesco Bardi in a 1–0 Serie A win over Genoa.

On 26 June 2025, Bagnolini moved on a season-long loan to Gubbio in Serie C.

== International career ==
Bagnolini was included in the Italian under-18 squad that took part in the 2022 Mediterranean Games in Oran, Algeria, with the Azzurrini eventually winning the silver medal after losing 1–0 against France in the final match.

== Career statistics ==
As of match played 24 May 2024

Appearances and goals by club, season and competition
Club	Season	League			Coppa Italia		Europe		Total	
Club	Season	Division	Apps	Goals	Apps	Goals	Apps	Goals	Apps	Goals
Bologna	2021–22	Serie A	1	0	0	0	—		1	0
Bologna	2022–23	Serie A	0	0	0	0	—		0	0
Bologna	2023–24	Serie A	1	0	0	0	—		1	0
Bologna	2024–25	Serie A	0	0	0	0	0	0	0	0
Career total			2	0	0	0	0	0	2	0

== Honours ==
Bologna

- Coppa Italia: 2024–25
