= Riccardo Orsolini =

Italian footballer (born 1997)

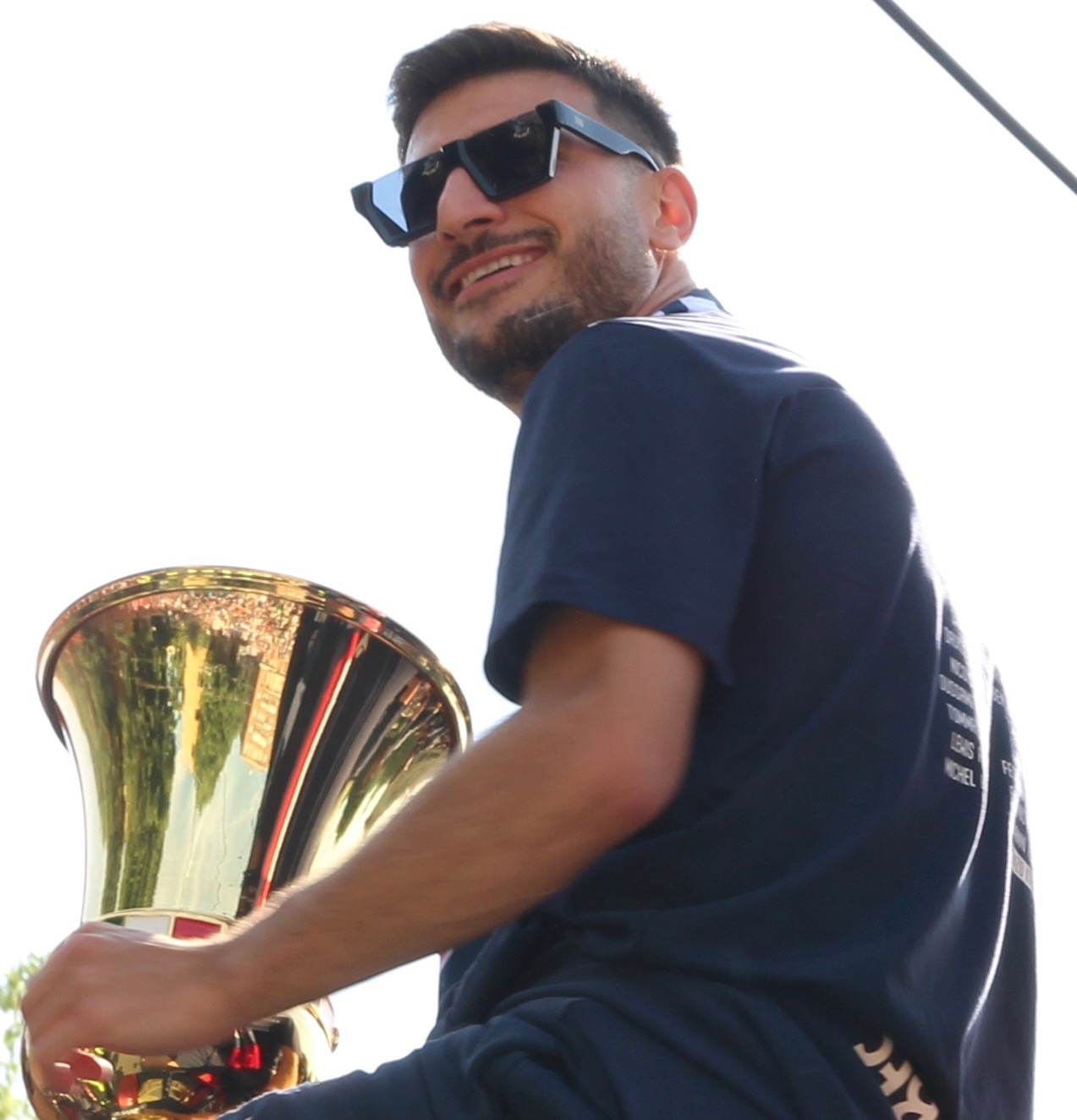
- Orsolini celebrating the Coppa Italia with Bologna in 2025

Personal information
- Date of birth: 24 January 1997 (age 29)
- Place of birth: Ascoli Piceno, Italy
- Height: 1.83 m (6 ft 0 in)
- Position: Winger

Team information
- Current team: Bologna
- Number: 7

Youth career
- 2004–2016: Ascoli

Senior career*
| Years | Team | Apps | (Gls) |
| 2014–2017 | Ascoli | 50 | (8) |
| 2017–2019 | Juventus | 0 | (0) |
| 2017–2018 | → Atalanta (loan) | 8 | (0) |
| 2018–2019 | → Bologna (loan) | 43 | (8) |
| 2019– | Bologna | 235 | (69) |

International career^{‡}
| 2016–2017 | Italy U20 | 12 | (8) |
| 2017–2019 | Italy U21 | 15 | (3) |
| 2019–2025 | Italy | 13 | (2) |
Medal record
Men's football
Representing Italy
FIFA U-20 World Cup
| Third place | 2017 South Korea |
- * Club domestic league appearances and goals as of 09:50, 8 November 2026 (UTC) ‡ National team caps and goals as of 13 November 2025

Riccardo Orsolini (born 24 January 1997) is an Italian professional footballer who plays as a winger for Serie A club Bologna.

== Club career ==
A product of Ascoli's youth academy, Orsolini made his first-team debut in the 2015–16 Serie B, earning nine appearances in the league. On 30 January 2017, he moved to Juventus permanently until June 2021 for a fee of €6 million, plus an extra €4 million depending on certain conditions. However, Orsolini remained in Ascoli Piceno until the end of the season. On 14 July 2017, Orsolini joined Atalanta on a two-year loan.

Having only appeared as a substitute for Atalanta, Orsolini returned to Juventus before moving to Bologna in January 2018, on a 18-month loan with a buy option. On 19 June 2019, Orsolini signed a deal with Bologna and signed for the club on a permanent basis. On 25 August 2023, Orsolini extended his contract with Bologna until 30 June 2027.

On 14 May 2025, Orsolini won Coppa Italia with Bologna, the club's first major trophy in 51 years. In the 2024–25 season, he achieved a personal best by scoring 15 goals in Serie A and totaling 17 across all competitions, making him the club's top scorer.

== International career ==
With the Italy U-20 side, Orsolini took part at the 2017 FIFA U-20 World Cup, and led the tournament in goals, scoring five, as Italy finished the competition in third place, their best ever result. Due to his prolific performances, he was named by many in the media as the outright best player on the Italian side.

On 18 November 2019, Orsolini made his senior debut under coach Roberto Mancini, coming on as a substitute for Nicolò Barella in a 9–1 home victory against Armenia during Italy's final UEFA Euro 2020 qualifying match. He also scored his first international goal whilst providing an assist for Federico Chiesa's as well.

== Style of play ==
Orsolini is a physically strong and fast-paced winger, who excels in one on one situations due to his excellent dribbling ability. Although Orsolini is naturally left-footed, he prefers to play on the right flank, in either a 4–3–3 or 4–2–3–1 formation, a position which allows him to cut into the centre and shoot on goal with his stronger foot.

== Career statistics ==
=== Club ===
As of match played 7 November 2026

Appearances and goals by club, season and competition
| Club | Season | League | | | Coppa Italia | | Europe | | Other | | Total | |
| Club | Season | Division | Apps | Goals | Apps | Goals | Apps | Goals | Apps | Goals | Apps | Goals |
|---|---|---|---|---|---|---|---|---|---|---|---|---|
| Ascoli | 2015–16 | Serie B | 9 | 0 | 0 | 0 | — | | — | | 9 | 0 |
| Ascoli | 2016–17 | Serie B | 41 | 8 | 1 | 0 | — | | — | | 42 | 8 |
| Ascoli | Total | | 50 | 8 | 1 | 0 | — | | — | | 51 | 8 |
| Atalanta (loan) | 2017–18 | Serie A | 8 | 0 | 1 | 0 | 1 (Note: Appearance(s) in UEFA Europa League) | 0 | — | | 10 | 0 |
| Bologna (loan) | 2017–18 | Serie A | 8 | 0 | 0 | 0 | — | | — | | 8 | 0 |
| Bologna (loan) | 2018–19 | Serie A | 35 | 8 | 2 | 2 | — | | — | | 37 | 10 |
| Bologna | 2019–20 | Serie A | 37 | 8 | 2 | 1 | — | | — | | 39 | 9 |
| Bologna | 2020–21 | Serie A | 34 | 7 | 2 | 2 | — | | — | | 36 | 9 |
| Bologna | 2021–22 | Serie A | 29 | 6 | 1 | 1 | — | | — | | 30 | 7 |
| Bologna | 2022–23 | Serie A | 32 | 11 | 2 | 0 | — | | — | | 34 | 11 |
| Bologna | 2023–24 | Serie A | 33 | 10 | 1 | 0 | — | | — | | 34 | 10 |
| Bologna | 2024–25 | Serie A | 30 | 15 | 4 | 2 | 6 (Note: Appearances in UEFA Champions League) | 0 | — | | 40 | 17 |
| Bologna | 2025–26 | Serie A | 35 | 10 | 1 | 0 | 13 | 3 | 2 (Note: Appearances in Supercoppa Italiana) | 1 | 51 | 14 |
| Bologna | 2026–27 | Serie A | 5 | 2 | 0 | 0 | — | | — | | 5 | 2 |
| Bologna | Bologna total | | 278 | 77 | 15 | 8 | 19 | 3 | 2 | 1 | 314 | 89 |
| Career total | | | 336 | 85 | 17 | 8 | 20 | 3 | 2 | 1 | 375 | 97 |

=== International ===
As of match played 13 November 2025

Appearances and goals by national team and year
| National team | Year | Apps | Goals |
|---|---|---|---|
| Italy | 2019 | 1 | 1 |
| Italy | 2020 | 1 | 1 |
| Italy | 2021 | 0 | 0 |
| Italy | 2022 | 0 | 0 |
| Italy | 2023 | 3 | 0 |
| Italy | 2024 | 2 | 0 |
| Italy | 2025 | 6 | 0 |
| Total | | 13 | 2 |

Scores and results list Italy's goal tally first, score column indicates score after each Orsolini goal.

List of international goals scored by Riccardo Orsolini
| No. | Date | Venue | Cap | Opponent | Score | Result | Competition |
|---|---|---|---|---|---|---|---|
| 1 | 18 November 2019 | Stadio Renzo Barbera, Palermo, Italy | 1 | Armenia | 8–0 | 9–1 | UEFA Euro 2020 qualification |
| 2 | 11 November 2020 | Stadio Artemio Franchi, Florence, Italy | 2 | Estonia | 4–0 | 4–0 | Friendly |

== Honours ==
Bologna

- Coppa Italia: 2024–25

Italy U20

- FIFA U-20 World Cup bronze medal: 2017

Individual

- FIFA U-20 World Cup Golden Boot: 2017 (5 goals)
- Serie A Team of the Season: 2024–25
