= Joshua Zirkzee =

Dutch footballer (born 2001)

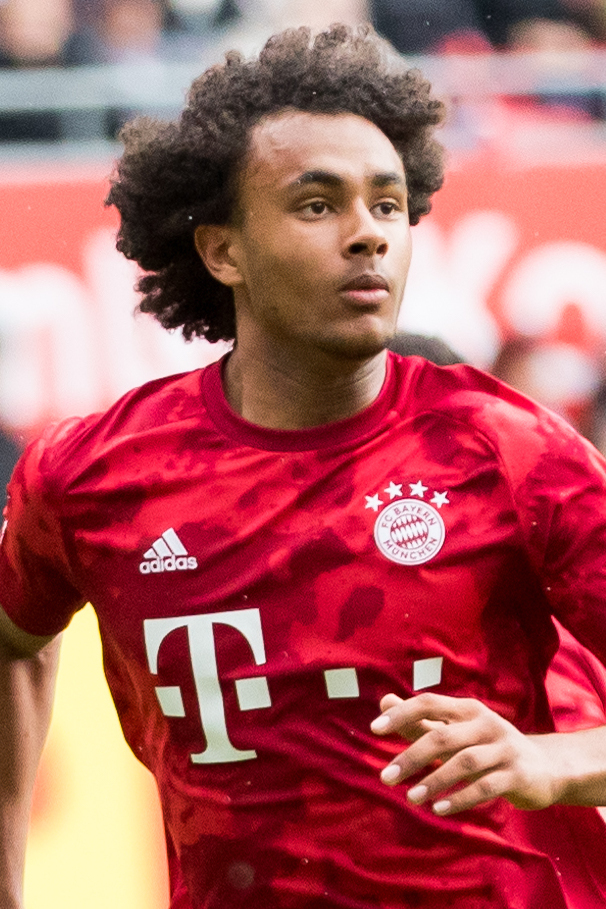
- Zirkzee playing for Bayern Munich in 2019

Personal information
- Full name: Joshua Orobosa Zirkzee
- Date of birth: 22 May 2001 (age 25)
- Place of birth: Schiedam, Netherlands
- Height: 1.93 m (6 ft 4 in)
- Position: Forward

Team information
- Current team: Manchester United
- Number: 11

Youth career
- 2007–2010: VV Hekelingen
- 2010–2013: Spartaan '20
- 2013–2016: ADO Den Haag
- 2016–2017: Feyenoord
- 2017–2019: Bayern Munich

Senior career*
Years	Team	Apps	(Gls)
2018–2021	Bayern Munich II	32	(6)
2019–2022	Bayern Munich	12	(4)
2021	→ Parma (loan)	4	(0)
2021–2022	→ Anderlecht (loan)	38	(16)
2022–2024	Bologna	53	(13)
2024–	Manchester United	63	(6)

International career^{‡}
2016	Netherlands U15	2	(0)
2016–2017	Netherlands U16	6	(3)
2017	Netherlands U17	2	(1)
2018	Netherlands U18	7	(2)
2019	Netherlands U19	9	(8)
2020–2023	Netherlands U21	19	(7)
2024–	Netherlands	8	(2)
Medal record
Men's football
Representing Netherlands
UEFA European Championship
Bronze medal – third place	2024 Germany	Team
- * Club domestic league appearances and goals as of 21:03, 22 November 2026 (UTC) ‡ National team caps and goals as of 20:50, 4 October 2026 (UTC)

Joshua Orobosa Zirkzee (born 22 May 2001) is a Dutch professional footballer who plays as a forward for Premier League club Manchester United and the Netherlands national team.

Zirkzee is a graduate of Bayern Munich's youth system and made 17 first-team appearances for the club. While at Bayern, he had loan spells at Parma and Anderlecht. Zirkzee signed for Bologna in August 2022. In the 2023–24 season, he was named in the Serie A Team of the Year and won the league's Best Under-23 player award. He joined Manchester United in July 2024.

Zirkzee made more than 40 appearances for the Netherlands at youth international level. He made his senior international debut in July 2024, at UEFA Euro 2024.

== Club career ==
=== Early years ===
Born in Schiedam to a Nigerian mother and a Dutch father, Zirkzee began his footballing career as a five-year-old with VV Hekelingen after the family had moved to Spijkenisse. After impressing early on, he moved to the youth department of Spartaan '20 in 2010, where he played alongside his cousin, Nelson Amadin. He then left for ADO Den Haag in 2013, before ending up in the Feyenoord youth academy in 2016. One year later, Zirkzee left the Feyenoord academy in his native Netherlands to join the youth setup of Bayern Munich.

=== Bayern Munich ===
On 1 March 2019, Zirkzee scored a hat-trick in his debut for Bayern Munich II. Just a day later, he scored the winning goal for the under-19 side as they defeated 1. FC Nürnberg 2–1. Zirkzee made his professional debut in the 3. Liga for Bayern Munich II on 20 July 2019, coming on as a substitute in the 74th minute for Oliver Batista Meier in the away match against Würzburger Kickers.

On 11 December 2019, Zirkzee made his debut for the senior team against Tottenham Hotspur in the final group stage match of the Champions League. He subsequently made his Bundesliga debut on 18 December, coming on as a substitute in the 90th minute in a match against Freiburg tied at 1–1; he scored the winner almost immediately after entering the game. Shortly after, Serge Gnabry added another stoppage-time goal to secure a 3–1 victory. Two days later, he again came off the bench in the final minutes of the game and scored the winning goal as Bayern defeated Wolfsburg. On 13 June 2020, Zirkzee scored the opening goal in Bayern Munich's 2–1 win against Borussia Mönchengladbach. He finished off his debut season with a continental treble.

==== Loan to Parma ====
On 31 January 2021, Zirkzee moved to Italian club Parma on a loan deal. The deal included an option to buy. On 2 April 2021, he suffered an LCL injury, and his loan was limited to four appearances, all as a substitute.

==== Loan to Anderlecht ====
On 3 August 2021, Anderlecht announced the signing of Zirkzee on a season-long loan from Bayern Munich. He finished the 2021–22 season as the club's top scorer with 16 goals, in addition to providing nine assists in 34 league starts.

=== Bologna ===
On 30 August 2022, Zirkzee transferred to Serie A club Bologna on a permanent deal. Later that year, on 16 October, he scored his first goal at the club, netting the opener in a 3–2 defeat against Napoli. In his second season under coach Thiago Motta, he managed to score eight goals in 16 games in the first half of the 2023–24 campaign, attracting transfer interest from several top European clubs with his former club Bayern Munich still having a 40% cut of any possible transfer fee. He ultimately finished the season as Bologna's top scorer, netting 11 league goals and providing four assists, helping his club secure a berth in the Champions League group stage.

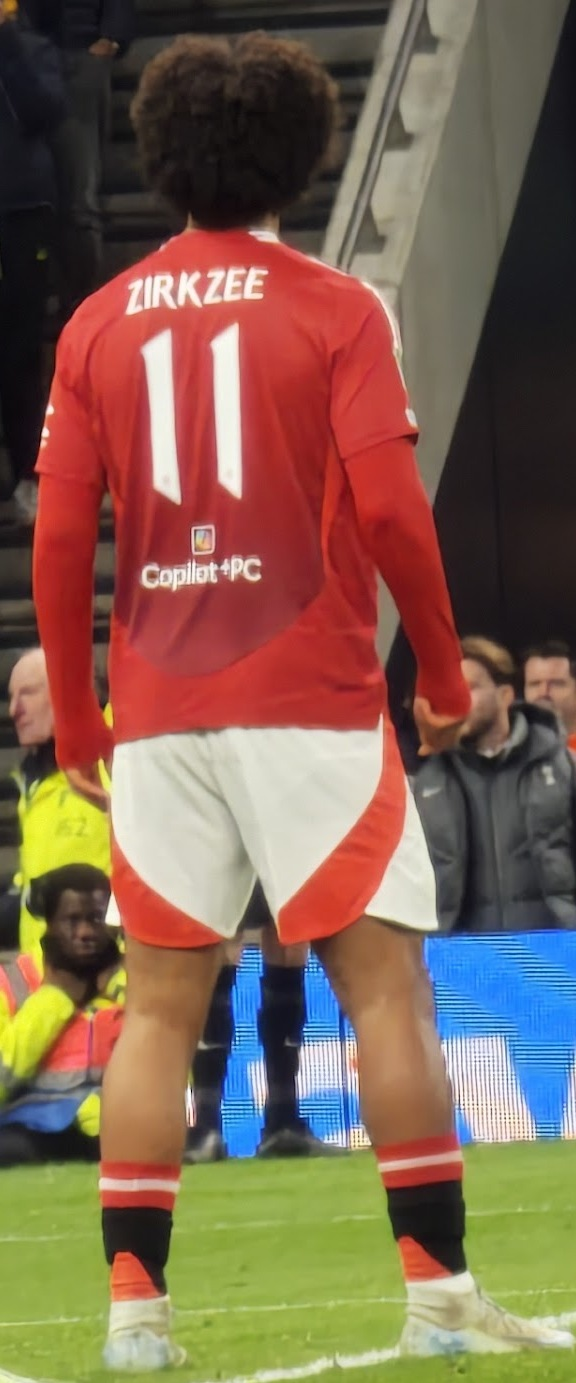
Zirkzee playing for Manchester United in 2024

=== Manchester United ===
On 14 July 2024, Premier League club Manchester United announced the signing of Zirkzee on a five-year contract for a fee of £36.5m. He made his debut as a substitute in the season's opening fixture against Fulham on 16 August, where he scored the match's only goal. He made his first start for United in a 3–0 defeat to rivals Liverpool at Old Trafford on 1 September. On 1 December, he scored a brace to help Manchester United secure a 4–0 victory over Everton. On 30 December, he was booed by the Old Trafford crowd as he was substituted off the pitch in the 33rd minute of a 2–0 defeat to Newcastle United.

On 12 January 2025, Zirkzee scored the winning penalty against Arsenal in the third round of the FA Cup following a 1–1 draw after extra time. On 2 March, he missed the deciding penalty against Fulham in the fifth round of the FA Cup as the holders were knocked out after losing the shootout 3–4 following a 1–1 draw after extra time. In the following match on 6 March, he scored his first goal in Europe, the opener in the first leg of United's Europa League round of 16 tie away to Real Sociedad, which finished a 1–1 draw. On 13 April, in a match against Newcastle United, he suffered a hamstring injury, with head coach Ruben Amorim confirming that the injury ruled him out for the rest of the season. However, Zirkzee made an unexpected return before the end of the season, as Amorim confirmed he would be available for the Europa League final against Tottenham Hotspur.

== International career ==
Born in the Netherlands to a Dutch father and a Nigerian mother, Zirkzee was eligible to represent the Netherlands or Nigeria at international level. He played youth international football for the Netherlands at under-15, under-16, under-17, under-18, under-19 and under-21 levels.

On 12 June 2024, Zirkzee was added to the Netherlands senior team's squad for the UEFA Euro 2024 tournament in Germany. He had not initially been chosen, but was called up by head coach Ronald Koeman following injuries to Dutch midfielders Frenkie de Jong and Teun Koopmeiners. On 6 July, he earned his first international cap during a 2–1 victory over Turkey in the quarter-finals, becoming the third player to debut for the Netherlands during a European competition following Martien Vreijsen (Euro 1980) and Cody Gakpo (2020).

== Style of play ==
Zirkzee is a versatile forward. His height and strength enable him to be dominant in the air as well as play with his back to goal and hold up the ball. Despite his tall frame, he has excellent technique and dribbling abilities which also allow him to drop deeper into a more traditional playmaker position.

== Career statistics ==
=== Club ===
As of match played 22 November 2026

Appearances and goals by club, season and competition
Club	Season	League			National cup (Note: Includes DFB-Pokal, Belgian Cup, Coppa Italia, FA Cup)		League cup (Note: Includes EFL Cup)		Europe		Other		Total	
Club	Season	Division	Apps	Goals	Apps	Goals	Apps	Goals	Apps	Goals	Apps	Goals	Apps	Goals
Bayern Munich II	2018–19	Regionalliga Bayern	12	4	—		—		—		—		12	4
Bayern Munich II	2019–20	3. Liga	16	2	—		—		—		—		16	2
Bayern Munich II	2020–21	3. Liga	4	0	—		—		—		—		4	0
Bayern Munich II	Total		32	6	—		—		—		—		32	6
Bayern Munich	2019–20	Bundesliga	9	4	2	0	—		1 (Note: Appearance(s) in UEFA Champions League)	0	0	0	12	4
Bayern Munich	2020–21	Bundesliga	3	0	0	0	—		1	0	1 (Note: Appearance in DFL-Supercup)	0	5	0
Bayern Munich	Total		12	4	2	0	—		2	0	1	0	17	4
Parma (loan)	2020–21	Serie A	4	0	—		—		—		—		4	0
Anderlecht (loan)	2021–22	Belgian Pro League	38	16	6	2	—		3 (Note: Appearances in UEFA Europa Conference League)	0	—		47	18
Bologna	2022–23	Serie A	19	2	2	0	—		—		—		21	2
Bologna	2023–24	Serie A	34	11	3	1	—		—		—		37	12
Bologna	Total		53	13	5	1	—		—		—		58	14
Manchester United	2024–25	Premier League	32	3	3	1	3	1	11 (Note: Appearances in UEFA Europa League)	2	0	0	49	7
Manchester United	2025–26	Premier League	24	2	1	0	1	0	—		—		26	2
Manchester United	2026–27	Premier League	7	1	0	0	1	0	3	1	—		11	2
Manchester United	Total		63	6	4	1	5	1	14	3	0	0	86	11
Career total			202	45	17	4	5	1	19	3	1	0	244	53

=== International ===
As of match played 4 October 2026

Appearances and goals by national team and year
National team	Year	Apps	Goals
Netherlands	2024	6	1
Netherlands	2025	0	0
Netherlands	2026	2	1
Total		8	2

Netherlands score listed first, score column indicates score after each Zirkzee goal.

List of international goals scored by Joshua Zirkzee
No.	Date	Venue	Cap	Opponent	Score	Result	Competition	Ref.
1	7 September 2024	Philips Stadion, Eindhoven, Netherlands	3	Bosnia and Herzegovina	1–0	5–2	2024–25 UEFA Nations League A	
2	4 October 2026	Philips Stadion, Eindhoven, Netherlands	8	Serbia	2–1	2–1	2026–27 UEFA Nations League A	

== Honours ==
Bayern Munich II

- Regionalliga Bayern: 2018–19

Bayern Munich

- Bundesliga: 2019–20
- DFB-Pokal: 2019–20
- DFL-Supercup: 2020, 2022
- UEFA Champions League: 2019–20
- UEFA Super Cup: 2020

Individual

- Serie A Best Under-23: 2023–24
- Serie A Team of the Year: 2023–24
