= Oussama El Azzouzi =

Moroccan footballer (born 2001)

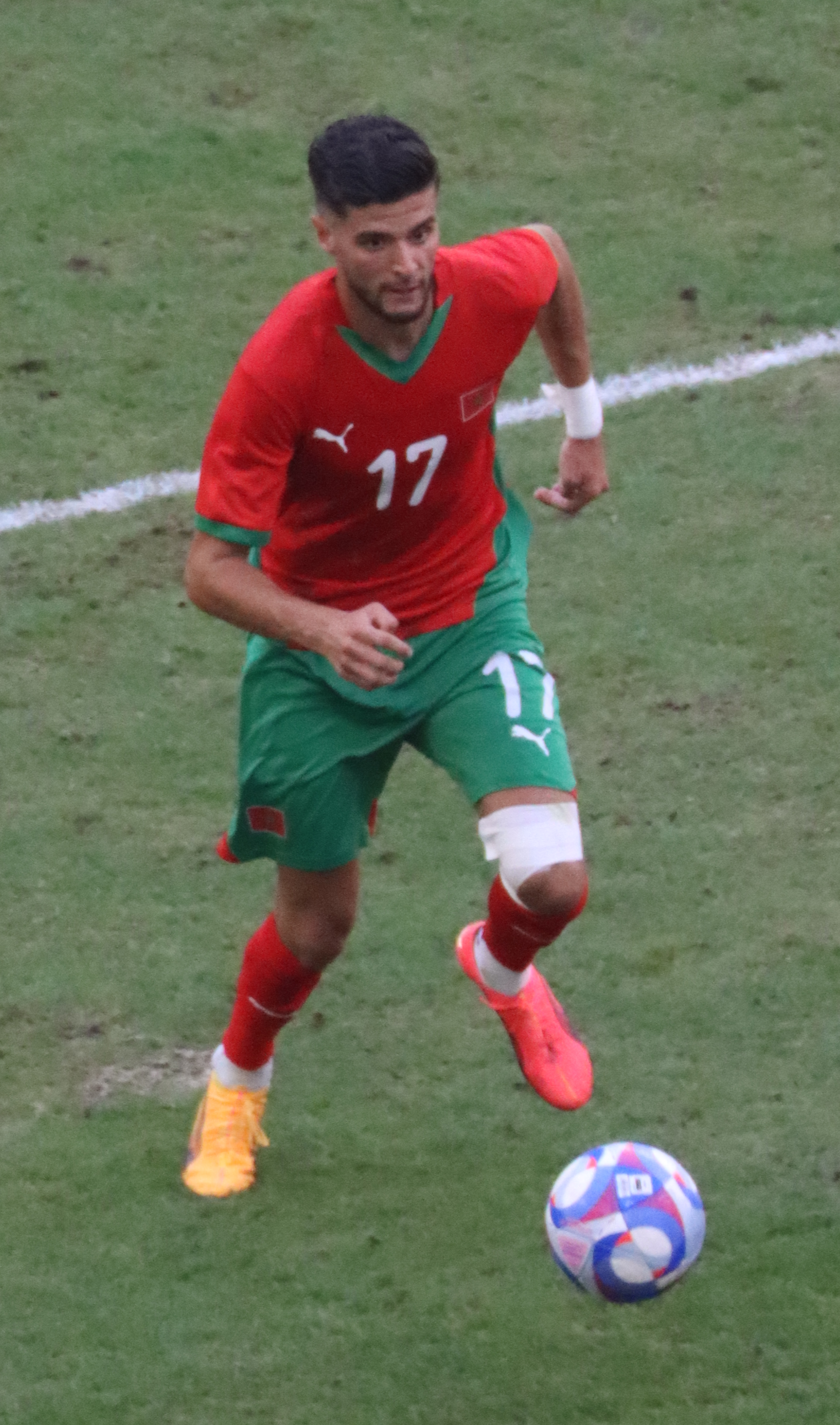
- El Azzouzi in 2024 with Morocco U23

Personal information
- Date of birth: 29 May 2001 (age 25)
- Place of birth: Veenendaal, Netherlands
- Height: 1.89 m (6 ft 2 in)
- Position: Defensive midfielder

Team information
- Current team: Bologna
- Number: 17

Youth career
- 2009–2011: VRC
- 2011–2016: Vitesse
- 2016–2018: DOVO
- 2018–2021: Groningen

Senior career*
Years	Team	Apps	(Gls)
2021–2022	Emmen	34	(1)
2022–2023	Union SG	23	(0)
2023–	Bologna	22	(2)
2025–2026	→ Auxerre (loan)	11	(1)

International career^{‡}
2023–2024	Morocco U23	12	(0)
2023–	Morocco	6	(0)
Medal record
Representing Morocco
U-23 Africa Cup of Nations
Winner	2023 Morocco
Olympic Games
Bronze medal – third place	2024 Paris	Team
- * Club domestic league appearances and goals as of 11 October 2026 ‡ National team caps and goals as of 23:35, 9 June 2025 (UTC)

Oussama El Azzouzi (Arabic: أسامة العزوزي; born 29 May 2001) is a professional footballer who plays as a defensive midfielder for Serie A club Bologna. Born in the Netherlands, he plays for the Morocco national team.

== Club career ==
El Azzouzi was born on 29 May 2001 in Veenendaal, Netherlands. He started playing organised football at local club VRC at age eight, before going on to play in the youth academies of Groningen and Vitesse, as well as amateur club DOVO. He made his professional debut for Emmen in the Eerste Divisie for one season, helping them gain promotion as champions to the Eredivisie at the end of the 2021–22 season. He signed a three-year contract in Union SG in July 2022, with the option of an extra year. He made his debut for Union SG on 6 August 2022, starting a 3–0 away defeat against Mechelen.

On 20 July 2023, El Azzouzi signed for Serie A club Bologna.

On 1 August 2025, El Azzouzi joined Auxerre in France on a season-long loan.

== International career ==
Born in the Netherlands, El Azzouzi is Moroccan by descent. He was called up to the Morocco U23s in March 2023.

In June 2023, he was included in the final squad of the under-23 national team for the 2023 U-23 Africa Cup of Nations, hosted by Morocco itself, where the Atlas Lions won their first title and qualified for the 2024 Summer Olympics.

In October 2023, he was called up to the Morocco senior national team for the first time. He made his senior debut for Morocco on 17 October 2023, starting a 3–0 home win against Liberia in a 2023 Africa Cup of Nations qualification match.

== Personal life ==
He is the twin brother of the footballer Anouar El Azzouzi.

== Career statistics ==
=== Club ===
As of match played 11 October 2026

Appearances and goals by club, season and competition
Club	Season	League			National cup (Note: Includes KNVB Cup, Belgian Cup, Coppa Italia)		Continental		Total	
Club	Season	Division	Apps	Goals	Apps	Goals	Apps	Goals	Apps	Goals
Emmen	2021–22	Eerste Divisie	34	1	2	0	—		36	1
Union SG	2022–23	Belgian Pro League	23	0	4	2	7 (Note: Appearances in UEFA Europa League)	0	34	2
Bologna	2023–24	Serie A	18	2	2	0	—		20	2
Bologna	2024–25	Serie A	2	0	1	0	0	0	3	0
Bologna	2026–27	Serie A	2	0	0	0	—		2	0
Bologna	Total		22	2	3	0	0	0	25	2
Auxerre (loan)	2025–26	Ligue 1	11	1	—		—		11	1
Career total			108	4	9	2	7	0	126	6

=== International ===
As of match played 9 June 2025

Appearances and goals by national team and year
National team	Year	Apps	Goals
Morocco	2023	1	0
Morocco	2024	4	0
Morocco	2025	1	0
Total		6	0

== Honours ==
FC Emmen

- Eerste Divisie: 2021–22

Bologna

- Coppa Italia: 2024–25

Morocco U23

- U-23 Africa Cup of Nations: 2023
- Summer Olympic bronze medal: 2024
