= Sam Beukema =

Dutch footballer (born 1998)

Personal information
- Date of birth: 17 November 1998 (age 27)
- Place of birth: Deventer, Netherlands
- Height: 1.88 m (6 ft 2 in)
- Position: Centre-back

Team information
- Current team: Napoli
- Number: 31

Youth career
- 2005–2009: DSC Diepenveen
- 2009–2013: Go Ahead Eagles
- 2013–2014: Twente
- 2014–2017: Go Ahead Eagles

Senior career*
Years	Team	Apps	(Gls)
2017–2021	Go Ahead Eagles	66	(9)
2021–2023	AZ	50	(5)
2023–2025	Bologna	65	(1)
2025–	Napoli	24	(2)
- * Club domestic league appearances and goals as of 23:07, 17 May 2026 (UTC)

Sam Beukema (born 17 November 1998) is a Dutch professional footballer who plays as a centre-back for Serie A club Napoli.

== Career ==
=== Go Ahead Eagles ===
Beukema made his Eerste Divisie debut for Go Ahead Eagles on 1 September 2017 in a game against Helmond Sport.

=== AZ Alkmaar ===
On 31 March 2021, Beukema signed a contract at AZ until 2026, joining the team as of July 2021.

=== Bologna ===
On 3 July 2023, AZ agreed a fee of €10 million to sign Beukema, with Denso Kasius heading the other way.

=== Napoli ===
On 20 July 2025, Beukema joined fellow Serie A club Napoli signing a five-year contract.

On 13 September, he netted his first goal on his league debut in a 3–1 away win over Fiorentina.

== Career statistics ==
As of match played 17 May 2026

Appearances and goals by club, season and competition
Club	Season	League			National cup (Note: Includes KNVB Cup, Coppa Italia)		Europe		Other		Total	
Club	Season	Division	Apps	Goals	Apps	Goals	Apps	Goals	Apps	Goals	Apps	Goals
Go Ahead Eagles	2017–18	Eerste Divisie	6	0	2	0	—		—		8	0
Go Ahead Eagles	2019–20	Eerste Divisie	23	1	2	1	—		—		25	2
Go Ahead Eagles	2020–21	Eerste Divisie	37	8	3	1	—		—		40	9
Go Ahead Eagles	Total		66	9	7	2	—		—		73	11
AZ	2021–22	Eredivisie	24	3	4	0	5 (Note: One appearance in UEFA Europa League, four appearances in UEFA Europa Conference League)	0	4 (Note: Appearances in Eredivisie European play-offs)	0	37	3
AZ	2022–23	Eredivisie	26	2	1	0	17 (Note: Appearances in UEFA Europa Conference League)	1	—		44	3
AZ	Total		50	5	5	0	22	1	4	0	81	6
Bologna	2023–24	Serie A	30	1	3	1	—		—		33	2
Bologna	2024–25	Serie A	35	0	4	0	8 (Note: Appearances in UEFA Champions League)	0	—		47	0
Bologna	Total		65	1	7	1	8	0	—		80	2
Napoli	2025–26	Serie A	24	2	2	0	6	0	0	0	32	2
Career total			224	17	21	3	36	1	4	0	266	21

== Honours ==
Bologna

- Coppa Italia: 2024–25

Napoli

- Supercoppa Italiana: 2025–26

Individual

- Eredivisie Team of the Month: January 2022, May 2023
