= Mattia Pagliuca =

Italian footballer (born 2002)

Personal information
- Date of birth: 25 April 2002 (age 24)
- Place of birth: Bologna, Italy
- Height: 1.83 m (6 ft 0 in)
- Positions: Winger; forward

Team information
- Current team: Virtus Verona
- Number: 44

Youth career
- Bologna

Senior career*
Years	Team	Apps	(Gls)
2020–2024	Bologna	1	(0)
2022–2023	→ Imolese (loan)	16	(0)
2023–2024	→ Alessandria (loan)	11	(0)
2024	→ Brindisi (loan)	12	(0)
2024–	Virtus Verona	44	(4)
- * Club domestic league appearances and goals as of 30 April 2026

Mattia Pagliuca (born 25 April 2002) is an Italian professional footballer who plays as a forward for Serie D club Virtus Verona.

== Club career ==
Mattia Pagliuca made his Serie A debut for Bologna on 13 December 2020 against Roma appearing as a substitute for Emanuel Vignato at the Stadio Renato Dall'Ara in a 5–1 defeat.

In the summer of 2022 he went on loan to Imolese; in December 2022 he suffered a cruciate ligament break in his knee which forced him to end the competitive season early.

On 21 August 2023 his transfer was announced, on annual loan, to Alessandria. On 1 February 2024, Pagliuca moved on loan to Brindisi.

On 8 August 2024, Pagliuca signed a two-season contract with Virtus Verona. With Virtus Verona, he scored his first senior professional goal on 12 October 2024, a late winner against Arzignano, with his father Gianluca present in the stands.

== Personal life ==
Mattia is the son of former Italian international goalkeeper Gianluca Pagliuca who also previously played for Bologna.
