= 2025–26 Bologna FC 1909 season =

Bologna
2025–26 season
- Owner: BFC 1909 Lux SPV S.A. (Saputo)
- Chairman: Joey Saputo
- Head coach: Vincenzo Italiano
- Stadium: Stadio Renato Dall'Ara
- Serie A: 8th
- Coppa Italia: Quarter-finals
- Supercoppa Italiana: Runners-up
- UEFA Europa League: Quarter-finals
- Top goalscorer: League: Riccardo Orsolini (10); All: Riccardo Orsolini (14)
- Average home league attendance: 27,742
- Biggest win: 4–0 vs Pisa (H); 5 October 2025, Serie A
- Biggest defeat: 0–4 vs Aston Villa (A); 16 April 2026, UEFA Europa League
Home colours	Away colours	Third colours

The 2025–26 season was the 117th season in the history of Bologna Football Club 1909, and the club's eleventh consecutive season in the Serie A. In addition to the domestic league, the club participated in the Coppa Italia and the UEFA Europa League. The club also competed in the Supercoppa Italiana, its debut appearance in the competition, having won the Coppa Italia in the previous season.

== Squad ==
No.	Player	Nat.	Position(s)	Date of birth (age)	Signed in	Contract ends	Signed from	Transfer fee	Notes	Apps	Goals
Goalkeepers
1	Łukasz Skorupski	(Poland)	GK	5 May 1991 (age 35)	2018	2026	(Italy) Roma	€9,000,000		237	0
13	Federico Ravaglia	(Italy)	GK	11 November 1999 (age 27)	2017	2028	(Italy) Bologna Primavera	NA	From Youth system	22	0
25	Massimo Pessina	(Italy)	GK	25 December 2007 (age 18)	2025	-	(Italy) Bologna Primavera	NA	From Youth system	0	0
Defenders
2	Emil Holm	(Sweden)	RB / RM	13 May 2000 (age 26)	2024	2028	(Italy) Spezia	€7,700,000		21	0
14	Torbjørn Heggem	(Norway)	CB / LB	12 January 1999 (age 27)	2025	2029	(England) West Bromwich Albion	€7,500,000		2	0
16	Nicolò Casale	(Italy)	CB	14 February 1998 (age 28)	2025	2028	(Italy) Lazio	€6,500,000		16	0
20	Nadir Zortea	(Italy)	RB / RM	19 June 1999 (age 27)	2025	2029	(Italy) Cagliari	€7,500,000		3	0
22	Charalampos Lykogiannis	(Greece)	LB / LM	22 October 1993 (age 33)	2022	2026	(Italy) Cagliari	Free		63	4
26	Jhon Lucumí	(Colombia)	CB	26 June 1998 (age 28)	2022	2027	(Belgium) Genk	€8,000,000		112	1
29	Lorenzo De Silvestri (captain)	(Italy)	RB / RM	23 May 1988 (age 38)	2020	2026	(Italy) Torino	Free		109	9
33	Juan Miranda	(Spain)	LB	19 May 2000 (age 26)	2024	2027	(Spain) Real Betis	Free		33	0
41	Martin Vitík	(Czech Republic)	CB	23 January 2003 (age 23)	2025	2029	(Czech Republic) Sparta Prague	€11,000,000		2	0
Midfielders
4	Tommaso Pobega	(Italy)	CM / DM	15 July 1999 (age 27)	2025	2026	(Italy) Milan	€1,900,000	On loan	23	2
6	Nikola Moro	(Croatia)	DM / CM	18 September 1998 (age 28)	2023	2027	(England) Chelsea	€20,000,000		72	2
8	Remo Freuler	(Switzerland)	CM / DM	15 April 1992 (age 34)	2024	2026	(England) Nottingham Forest	€16,000,000		72	2
19	Lewis Ferguson	(Scotland)	CM / AM	24 August 1998 (age 28)	2022	2028	(Scotland) Aberdeen	€2,000,000		80	14
21	Jens Odgaard	(Denmark)	AM / RW / ST	31 March 1999 (age 27)	2024	2027	(Netherlands) AZ	€4,280,000		42	8
77	Ibrahim Sulemana	(Ghana)	DM / CM	22 May 2003 (age 23)	2025	2026	(Italy) Atalanta	€500,000	On loan	0	0
80	Giovanni Fabbian	(Italy)	CM / AM	14 January 2003 (age 23)	2023	2028	(Italy) Internazionale	€5,370,000		60	8
Forwards
7	Riccardo Orsolini	(Italy)	RW	24 January 1997 (age 29)	2019	2027	(Italy) Juventus	€15,000,000		241	66
9	Santiago Castro	(Argentina)	ST	18 September 2004 (age 22)	2024	2028	(Argentina) Vélez Sarsfield	€13,200,000		47	9
10	Federico Bernardeschi	(Italy)	RW / AM	16 February 1994 (age 32)	2025	2027	(Canada) Toronto FC	Free		2	0
11	Jonathan Rowe	(England)	LW / AM	30 April 2003 (age 23)	2025	2029	(France) Marseille	€17,000,000		1	0
17	Ciro Immobile	(Italy)	ST	20 February 1990 (age 36)	2025	2026	(Turkey) Beşiktaş	Free		1	0
24	Thijs Dallinga	(Netherlands)	ST	3 August 2000 (age 26)	2024	2028	(France) Toulouse	€15,000,000		34	3
28	Nicolò Cambiaghi	(Italy)	LW / SS	28 December 2000 (age 25)	2024	2029	(Italy) Atalanta	€10,000,000		21	1
30	Benja Domínguez	(Argentina)	LW	19 September 2003 (age 23)	2024	2029	(Argentina) Gimnasia y Esgrima (LP)	€4,000,000		24	3

== Transfers ==
=== Summer window ===
==== In ====
Date	Pos.	Player	From	Fee	Notes	Ref.
1 July 2025	GK	(Chile) Thomas Gillier	(Chile) Universidad Católica	Free		
1 July 2025	DF	(Italy) Nicolò Casale	(Italy) Lazio	€6,500,000	From loan to permanent transfer	
6 July 2025	DF	(Czech Republic) Martin Vitík	(Czech Republic) Sparta Prague	€11,000,000		
10 July 2025	FW	(Italy) Ciro Immobile	(Turkey) Beşiktaş	Free		
19 July 2025	FW	(Italy) Federico Bernardeschi	(Canada) Toronto FC	Free		
16 August 2025	DF	(Norway) Torbjørn Heggem	(England) West Bromwich Albion	€7,500,000		
20 August 2025	DF	(Italy) Nadir Zortea	(Italy) Cagliari	€7,500,000		
24 August 2025	FW	(England) Jonathan Rowe	(France) Marseille	€17,000,000		

==== Loans in ====
Date	Pos.	Player	From	Fee	Notes	Ref.
22 July 2025	MF	(Italy) Tommaso Pobega	(Italy) Milan	€1,000,000	Obligation to buy for €7,000,000 under conditions	
1 September 2025	MF	(Ghana) Ibrahim Sulemana	(Italy) Atalanta	€500,000	Option to buy for €7,000,000	

==== Out ====
Date	Pos.	Player	To	Fee	Notes	Ref.
1 July 2025	FW	(Italy) Gianmarco Cangiano	(Italy) Pescara	€1,000,000	From loan to permanent transfer	
20 July 2025	DF	(Netherlands) Sam Beukema	(Italy) Napoli	€31,000,000		
31 July 2025	MF	(Iceland) Andri Baldursson	(Turkey) Kasımpaşa	€500,000		
31 July 2025	FW	(Switzerland) Dan Ndoye	(England) Nottingham Forest	€42,000,000		
4 August 2025	DF	(Croatia) Martin Erlić	(Denmark) Midtjylland	€5,000,000		
14 August 2025	MF	(Italy) Andrea Mazia	(Italy) Sasso Marconi	Free		
2 September 2025	MF	(Poland) Kacper Urbański	(Poland) Legia Warsaw	€2,000,000		

==== Loans out ====
Date	Pos.	Player	To	Fee	Notes	Ref.
26 June 2025	GK	(Italy) Nicola Bagnolini	(Italy) Gubbio	Free		
15 July 2025	GK	(Italy) Francesco Raffaelli	(Italy) Ospitaletto	Free		
15 July 2025	FW	(Italy) Gennaro Anatriello	(Italy) Potenza	Free		
16 July 2025	MF	(Finland) Niklas Pyyhtiä	(Italy) Modena	Free		
17 July 2025	GK	(Italy) Davide Franzini	(Italy) Bra	Free		
17 July 2025	FW	(Italy) Antonio Raimondo	(Italy) Frosinone	Free		
19 July 2025	DF	(Uruguay) Joaquín Sosa	(Colombia) Independente Santa Fe	Free		
22 July 2025	MF	(Italy) Manuel Rosetti	(Italy) Carpi	Free		
23 July 2025	DF	(Italy) Riccardo Stivanello	(Italy) Torres	Free		
24 July 2025	GK	(Chile) Thomas Gillier	(Canada) CF Montréal	Free		
31 July 2025	DF	(Italy) Mattia Motolese	(Italy) Pro Patria	Free		
1 August 2025	MF	(Morocco) Oussama El Azzouzi	(France) Auxerre	Free		
3 August 2025	MF	(Switzerland) Michel Aebischer	(Italy) Pisa	Free	Obligation to buy for €4,500,000 under conditions	
27 August 2025	MF	(Morocco) Naïm Byar	(Italy) Foggia	Free		
30 August 2025	FW	(Italy) Giuseppe Battimelli	(Italy) Pontedera	Free		
1 September 2025	DF	(Italy) Tommaso Corazza	(Italy) Pescara	Free		
1 September 2025	DF	(Austria) Stefan Posch	(Italy) Como	€500,000	Obligation to buy for €5,500,000 under conditions	
1 September 2025	FW	(Sweden) Jesper Karlsson	(Scotland) Aberdeen	Free		
1 September 2025	FW	(Nigeria) Orji Okwonkwo	(Italy) Pescara	Free		
8 September 2025	DF	(Serbia) Mihajlo Ilić	(Belgium) Anderlecht	Free	Option to buy for an undisclosed fee	

=== Winter window ===
==== In ====
Date	Pos.	Player	From	Fee	Notes	Ref.
31 December 2025	DF	(Uruguay) Joaquín Sosa	(Colombia) Independente Santa Fe	Free	Return from loan	
2 January 2026	DF	(Italy) Riccardo Stivanello	(Italy) Torres	Free	Return from loan	
6 January 2026	MF	(Morocco) Naïm Byar	(Italy) Foggia	Free	Return from loan	
16 January 2026	DF	(Norway) Eivind Helland	(Norway) Brann	€7,000,000		
20 January 2026	GK	(Italy) Francesco Raffaelli	(Italy) Ospitaletto	Free	Return from loan	
22 January 2026	FW	(Sweden) Jesper Karlsson	(Scotland) Aberdeen	Free	Return from loan	
26 January 2026	FW	(Italy) Giuseppe Battimelli	(Italy) Pontedera	Free	Return from loan	
30 January 2026	DF	(Italy) Tommaso Corazza	(Italy) Pescara	Free	Return from loan	
1 February 2026	FW	(Italy) Gennaro Anatriello	(Italy) Potenza	Free	Return from loan	

==== Loans in ====
Date	Pos.	Player	From	Fee	Notes	Ref.
3 January 2026	MF	(Portugal) João Mário	(Italy) Juventus	Free		
22 January 2026	MF	(Switzerland) Simon Sohm	(Italy) Fiorentina	Free	Option to buy for €12,000,000	

==== Out ====
Date	Pos.	Player	To	Fee	Notes	Ref.
7 January 2026	MF	(Morocco) Naïm Byar	(Morocco) Wydad Casablanca	Undisclosed		
20 January 2026	MF	(Ghana) Ibrahim Sulemana	(Italy) Atalanta	Free	Loan terminated early	
21 January 2026	DF	(Austria) Stefan Posch	(Italy) Como	€5,500,000	Option to buy activated	
1 February 2026	FW	(Italy) Ciro Immobile	(France) Paris FC	Free		

==== Loans out ====
Date	Pos.	Player	To	Fee	Notes	Ref.
2 January 2026	DF	(Uruguay) Joaquín Sosa	(Chile) Colo-Colo	Free		
2 January 2026	DF	(Italy) Riccardo Stivanello	(Italy) Lumezzane	Free		
21 January 2026	GK	(Italy) Francesco Raffaelli	(Italy) Alcione Milano	Free		
21 January 2026	MF	(Italy) Giovanni Fabbian	(Italy) Fiorentina	Free	Obligation to buy for €15,000,000 under certain conditions	
23 January 2026	FW	(Sweden) Jesper Karlsson	(Netherlands) Utrecht	Free		
27 January 2026	FW	(Italy) Giuseppe Battimelli	(Italy) Trapani	Free		
2 February 2026	DF	(Italy) Tommaso Corazza	(Italy) Cesena	Free		
2 February 2026	DF	(Sweden) Emil Holm	(Italy) Juventus	Free	Option to buy for €15,000,000	
2 February 2026	FW	(Italy) Gennaro Anatriello	(Italy) Lumezzane	Free		

== Competitions ==
=== Overall record ===
Competition	First match	Last match	Starting round	Final position	Record							
Competition	First match	Last match	Starting round	Final position	Pld	W	D	L	GF	GA	GD	Win %
Serie A	23 August 2025	23 May 2026	Matchday 1	8th	38	16	8	14	49	46	+3	42.11
Coppa Italia	4 December 2025	11 February 2026	Round of 16	Quarter-finals	2	1	1	0	3	2	+1	50.00
Supercoppa Italiana	19 December 2025	22 December 2025	Semi-finals	Runners-up	2	0	1	1	1	3	−2	0.00
UEFA Europa League	25 September 2025	16 April 2026	League phase	Quarter-finals	14	7	4	3	22	18	+4	50.00
Total					56	24	14	18	75	69	+6	42.86

Source: Soccerway

=== Serie A ===
==== League table ====
Pos	Team	Pld	W	D	L	GF	GA	GD	Pts	Qualification or relegation
6	Juventus	38	19	12	7	61	34	+27	69	Qualification for the UEFA Europa League league phase (Note: Since the 2025–26 Coppa Italia winners, Inter Milan, qualified for the Champions League via league position, the Europa League spot awarded to the cup winners was passed to the sixth-placed team, and the Conference League spot was moved down one league position.)
7	Atalanta	38	15	14	9	51	36	+15	59	Qualification for the UEFA Conference League play-off round
8	Bologna	38	16	8	14	49	46	+3	56	
9	Lazio	38	14	12	12	41	40	+1	54	
10	Udinese	38	14	8	16	45	48	−3	50	

Source: Serie A
Rules for classification: 1) Points; 2) Tiebreaker for Champions team and third relegated team; 3) Head-to-head points; 4) Head-to-head goal difference; 5) Goal difference; 6) Goals scored; 7) Draw.
(Note: Head-to-head record is used only after all the matches between the teams in question have been played)

==== Results summary ====
Overall								Home						Away					
Pld	W	D	L	GF	GA	GD	Pts	W	D	L	GF	GA	GD	W	D	L	GF	GA	GD
38	16	8	14	49	46	+3	56	7	4	9	20	23	−3	9	4	5	29	23	+6

Source: Serie A

==== Results by round ====
Round	1	2	3	4	5	6	7	8	9	10	11	12	13	14	15	17	18	19	20	16^{1}	21	22	23	24	25	26	27	28	29	30	31	32	33	34	35	36	37	38
Ground	A	H	A	H	A	H	A	A	H	A	H	A	H	A	H	H	A	H	A	A	H	A	H	H	A	H	A	H	A	H	A	H	A	H	H	A	A	H
Result	L	W	L	W	D	W	W	D	D	W	W	W	L	D	L	D	L	L	D	W	L	L	L	L	W	W	W	L	W	L	W	W	L	L	D	W	W	D
Position	16	10	13	11	9	7	5	5	6	5	5	5	6	5	6	7	7	8	9	8	8	8	10	10	8	8	8	8	8	9	8	8	8	9	9	8	8	8

Source: Serie A
A = Away; H = Home; W = Win; D = Draw; L = Loss

^{1} Matchday 16 (vs Hellas Verona) was postponed due to Bologna's participation in the Supercoppa Italiana.

==== Matches ====
The match schedule was released on 6 June 2025.

23 August 2025 1	Roma	1–0	Bologna	Rome
20:45 CEST (UTC+2)	Wesley 53'; Mancini (yellow card) 67'	Report	Freuler (yellow card) 19'	Stadium: Stadio Olimpico; Attendance: 63,681; Referee: Luca Zufferli

30 August 2025 2	Bologna	1–0	Como	Bologna
18:30 CEST (UTC+2)	Cambiaghi (yellow card) 2'; Vitík (yellow card) 37'; Orsolini 59'; Lucumí (yellow card) 67'; Pobega (yellow card) 78'	Report	Perrone (yellow card) 28'; Smolčić (yellow card) 35'; Ramón (yellow card) 75'; Vojvoda (yellow card) 90+6'	Stadium: Stadio Renato Dall'Ara; Attendance: 28,369; Referee: Daniele Doveri

14 September 2025 3	Milan	1–0	Bologna	Milan
20:45 CEST (UTC+2)	Estupiñán (yellow card) 10'; Tomori (yellow card) 18'; Saelemaekers (yellow card) 45+1'; Modrić 61'	Report	Miranda (yellow card) 73'; Skorupski (yellow card) 86'	Stadium: San Siro; Attendance: 69,593; Referee: Matteo Marcenaro

20 September 2025 4	Bologna	2–1	Genoa	Bologna
15:00 CEST (UTC+2)	Bernardeschi (yellow card) 8'; Castro 73'; Orsolini 90+9' (pen.)	Report	Vitinha (yellow card) 37'; Masini (yellow card) 42'; Ellertsson 63'; Norton-Cuffy (yellow card) 74'; Carboni (yellow card) 90+11'	Stadium: Stadio Renato Dall'Ara; Attendance: 27,976; Referee: Giuseppe Collu

28 September 2025 5	Lecce	2–2	Bologna	Lecce
18:00 CEST (UTC+2)	Coulibaly 13'; Gaspar (yellow card) 55'; Ramadani (yellow card) 61'; Gallo (yellow card) 66'; Camarda 90+4', (yellow card) 90+5'	Report	Dallinga (yellow card) 30'; Orsolini 45' (pen.); Odgaard 71'; Bernardeschi (yellow card) 89'	Stadium: Stadio Via del mare Attendance: 24,548; Referee: Francesco Fourneau

5 October 2025 6	Bologna	4–0	Pisa	Bologna
15:00 CEST (UTC+2)	Cambiaghi 24'; Moro 38'; Orsolini 40'; Odgaard 53'	Report	Touré (red card) 36'; Cuadrado (yellow card) 71'	Stadium: Stadio Renato Dall'Ara; Attendance: 27,972; Referee: Rosario Abisso

19 October 2025 7	Cagliari	0–2	Bologna	Cagliari
15:00 CEST (UTC+2)	Esposito (yellow card) 76'	Report	Miranda (yellow card) 13'; Holm 31'; Ferguson (yellow card) 62'; Orsolini 80'; Lykogiannis (yellow card) 90+2'	Stadium: Unipol Domus; Attendance: 16,168; Referee: Matteo Marchetti

26 October 2025 8	Fiorentina	2–2	Bologna	Florence
18:00 CET (UTC+1)	Gosens (yellow card) 36'; Guðmundsson 74' (pen.); Kean 90+4' (pen.); Džeko (yellow card) 90+6'	Report	Castro 25'; Freuler (yellow card) 39'; Cambiaghi 52'; Holm (yellow card) 71' (yellow-red card) 83'; Rowe (yellow card) 87'; Lucumí (yellow card) 90+6'	Stadium: Stadio Artemio Franchi; Attendance: 19,445; Referee: Federico La Penna

29 October 2025 9	Bologna	0–0	Torino	Bologna
20:45 CET (UTC+1)	Odgaard (yellow card) 64'; Lykogiannis (yellow card) 85'	Report	Ilić (yellow card) 37'; Tameze (yellow card) 40'; Ismajli (yellow card) 71'	Stadium: Stadio Renato Dall'Ara; Attendance: 25,691; Referee: Giovanni Ayroldi

2 November 2025 10	Parma	1–3	Bologna	Parma
18:00 CET (UTC+1)	Bernabé 1'; Ordóñez (yellow card) 28' (yellow-red card) 35'; Valenti (yellow card) 79'	Report	Castro 17', 68', (yellow card) 61'; Cambiaghi (yellow card) 87'; Miranda 90+2'	Stadium: Stadio Ennio Tardini; Attendance: 18,672; Referee: Kevin Bonacina

9 November 2025 11	Bologna	2–0	Napoli	Bologna
15:00 CET (UTC+1)	Dallinga 50'; Lucumí 66'; Orsolini (yellow card) 74'	Report	Højlund (yellow card) 63'; Lang (yellow card) 71'; Neres (yellow card) 76'	Stadium: Stadio Renato Dall'Ara; Attendance: 33,174; Referee: Daniele Chiffi

22 November 2025 12	Udinese	0–3	Bologna	Udine
15:00 CET (UTC+1)		Report	Orsolini (penalty missed) 41'; De Silvestri (yellow card) 45+5'; Pobega 54', 60'; Bernardeschi 90+4'	Stadium: Stadio Friuli; Attendance: 23,756; Referee: Juan Luca Sacchi

1 December 2025 13	Bologna	1–3	Cremonese	Bologna
20:45 CET (UTC+1)	Orsolini 45+3' (pen.)	Report	Pezzella (yellow card) 25'; Payero 31'; Vardy 35', 50'; Terracciano (yellow card) 59'	Stadium: Stadio Renato Dall'Ara; Attendance: 25,277; Referee: Ermanno Feliciani

7 December 2025 14	Lazio	1–1	Bologna	Rome
18:00 CET (UTC+1)	Tavares (yellow card) 20'; Isaksen 38'; Lazzari (yellow card) 67'; Gila (yellow card) 78', (red card) 79'	Report	Moro (yellow card) 30'; Odgaard 40'; Cambiaghi (yellow card) 49'; Miranda (yellow card) 84'	Stadium: Stadio Olimpico; Attendance: 43,325; Referee: Michael Fabbri

14 December 2025 15	Bologna	0–1	Juventus	Bologna
20:45 CET (UTC+1)	Miranda (yellow card) 24'; Heggem (red card) 69'; Sulemana (yellow card) 90'; De Silvestri (yellow card) 90+4'	Report	Koopmeiners (yellow card) 19'; Cabal 64'	Stadium: Stadio Renato Dall'Ara; Attendance: 32,911; Referee: Davide Massa

28 December 2025 17	Bologna	1–1	Sassuolo	Bologna
18:00 CET (UTC+1)	Ravaglia (yellow card) 45'; Fabbian 47'; Domínguez (yellow card) 82'	Report	Candé (yellow card) 21'; Laurienté (yellow card) 52'; Muharemović 63'; Fadera (yellow card) 87'	Stadium: Stadio Renato Dall'Ara; Attendance: 27,832; Referee: Juan Luca Sacchi

4 January 2026 18	Internazionale	3–1	Bologna	Milan
20:45 CET (UTC+1)	Çalhanoğlu (yellow card) 29'; Bastoni (yellow card) 30'; Zieliński 39'; L. Martínez 48'; Barella (yellow card) 62'; Thuram 74'	Report	Vitík (yellow card) 72'; Rowe (yellow card) 78'; Castro 83'; Lykogiannis (yellow card) 89'	Stadium: San Siro; Attendance: 74,710; Referee: Marco Guida

7 January 2026 19	Bologna	0–2	Atalanta	Bologna
18:30 CET (UTC+1)		Report	Krstović 37', 60'	Stadium: Stadio Renato Dall'Ara; Attendance: 23,454; Referee: Marco Di Bello

10 January 2026 20	Como	1–1	Bologna	Como
15:00 CET (UTC+1)	Paz (yellow card) 40'; Da Cunha (yellow card) 48'; Van Der Brempt (yellow card) 58'; Baturina 90+4'	Report	Cambiaghi 49', (red card) 58'; Freuler (yellow card) 65'; Zortea (yellow card) 70'; Ferguson (yellow card) 83'	Stadium: Stadio Giuseppe Sinigaglia; Attendance: 11,667; Referee: Rosario Abisso

15 January 2026 16	Hellas Verona	2–3	Bologna	Verona
18:30 CET (UTC+1)	Núñez (yellow card) 12'; Orban 13'; Freuler 71' (o.g.)	Report	Orsolini 21', (yellow card) 59'; Odgaard 29'; Vitík (yellow card) 42'; Castro 44'	Stadium: Stadio Marcantonio Bentegodi; Attendance: 17,585; Referee: Maurizio Mariani
Note: The match was originally scheduled for 21 December 2025, but was postponed due to Bologna's participation in the Supercoppa Italiana.

18 January 2026 21	Bologna	1–2	Fiorentina	Bologna
15:00 CET (UTC+1)	Holm (yellow card) 38'; Miranda (yellow card) 77'; Fabbian 88'; Ferguson (yellow card) 90'	Report	Mandragora 19'; Piccoli 45'	Stadium: Stadio Renato Dall'Ara; Attendance: 27,590; Referee: Daniele Doveri

25 January 2026 22	Genoa	3–2	Bologna	Genoa
15:00 CET (UTC+1)	Malinovskyi 62', (yellow card) 71'; Ekuban 78'; Messias 90+1'; Marcandalli (yellow card) 90+7'	Report	Ferguson 35'; Otoa 47' (o.g.); Skorupski (red card) 56'; Immobile (yellow card) 68'; Ravaglia (yellow card) 75'	Stadium: Stadio Luigi Ferraris; Attendance: 30,146; Referee: Fabio Maresca

3 February 2026 23	Bologna	0–3	Milan	Bologna
20:45 CET (UTC+1)	Ravaglia (yellow card) 51'; Freuler (yellow card) 58'; Ferguson (yellow card) 65'	Report	Loftus-Cheek 20'; Nkunku 39' (pen.); Rabiot 48'	Stadium: Stadio Renato Dall'Ara; Attendance: 30,932; Referee: Gianluca Manganiello

8 February 2026 24	Bologna	0–1	Parma	Bologna
12:30 CET (UTC+1)	Pobega (red card) 18'; Lucumí (yellow card) 76'	Report	Britschgi (yellow card) 49'; Troilo (yellow card) 61' (yellow-red card) 79'; Ordóñez 90+5'	Stadium: Stadio Renato Dall'Ara; Attendance: 24,823; Referee: Giuseppe Collu

15 February 2026 25	Torino	1–2	Bologna	Turin
18:00 CET (UTC+1)	Maripán (yellow card) 20'; Gineitis (yellow card) 51'; Vlašić 62', (yellow card) 87'	Report	Moro 49'; Castro 70'; Sohm (yellow card) 81'	Stadium: Stadio Olimpico Grande Torino; Attendance: 5,000; Referee: Francesco Fourneau

23 February 2026 26	Bologna	1–0	Udinese	Bologna
20:45 CET (UTC+1)	Miranda (yellow card) 68'; Bernardeschi 75' (pen.)	Report	Buksa (yellow card) 62'	Stadium: Stadio Renato Dall'Ara; Attendance: 23,238; Referee: Matteo Marcenaro

2 March 2026 27	Pisa	0–1	Bologna	Pisa
18:30 CET (UTC+1)		Report	Freuler (yellow card) 53'; Lucumí (yellow card) 82'; Odgaard 90'	Stadium: Arena Garibaldi; Attendance: 9,604; Referee: Ermanno Feliciani

8 March 2026 28	Bologna	1–2	Hellas Verona	Bologna
15:00 CET (UTC+1)	Ferguson (yellow card) 40'; Rowe 49'	Report	Bowie (yellow card) 16', (goal) 57'; Harroui (yellow card) 42'; Frese 53'	Stadium: Stadio Renato Dall'Ara; Attendance: 27,063; Referee: Giuseppe Mucera

15 March 2026 29	Sassuolo	0–1	Bologna	Reggio Emilia
15:00 CET (UTC+1)	Nzola (yellow card) 77'	Report	Dallinga 6', (yellow card) 24'; Zortea (yellow card) 90+6'	Stadium: Mapei Stadium – Città del Tricolore; Attendance: 13,043; Referee: Kevin Bonacina

22 March 2026 30	Bologna	0–2	Lazio	Bologna
15:00 CET (UTC+1)	Orsolini (penalty missed) 51'; Castro (yellow card) 65'	Report	Taylor 72', 82', (yellow card) 77'	Stadium: Stadio Renato Dall'Ara; Attendance: 27,539; Referee: Ermanno Feliciani

5 April 2026 31	Cremonese	1–2	Bologna	Cremona
15:00 CEST (UTC+2)	Maleh (yellow card) 45', (red card) 90+4'; Bonazzoli 90+1' (pen.); Payero (yellow card) 90+5'	Report	João Mário 3'; Rowe 16'; Ravaglia (yellow card) 75'; Ferguson (yellow card) 90+5' (yellow-red card) 90+6'	Stadium: Stadio Giovanni Zini; Attendance: 10,629; Referee: Rosario Abisso

12 April 2026 32	Bologna	2–0	Lecce	Bologna
18:00 CEST (UTC+2)	Freuler 26'; Orsolini 90+2'	Report	Ngom (yellow card) 36'; Siebert (yellow card) 38'	Stadium: Stadio Renato Dall'Ara; Attendance: 26,141; Referee: Andrea Colombo

19 April 2026 33	Juventus	2–0	Bologna	Turin
20:45 CEST (UTC+2)	David 2'; Thuram 57'; Locatelli (yellow card) 60'	Report		Stadium: Juventus Stadium; Attendance: 40,516; Referee: Maurizio Mariani

25 April 2026 34	Bologna	0–2	Roma	Bologna
18:00 CEST (UTC+2)		Report	Malen 7'; El Aynaoui 45+2', (yellow card) 69'; Hermoso (yellow card) 46'; Rensch (yellow card) 66'	Stadium: Stadio Renato Dall'Ara; Attendance: 28,961; Referee: Marco Di Bello

3 May 2026 35	Bologna	0–0	Cagliari	Bologna
12:30 CEST (UTC+2)	Helland (yellow card) 68'; Castro (yellow card) 90+5'	Report	Adopo (yellow card) 52'	Stadium: Stadio Renato Dall'Ara; Attendance: 28,416; Referee: Valerio Crezzini

11 May 2026 36	Napoli	2–3	Bologna	Naples
20:45 CEST (UTC+2)	Di Lorenzo 45+2'; Alisson 48'; Politano (yellow card) 84'	Report	Bernardeschi 10', (yellow card) 47'; Orsolini 34' (pen.); João Mário (yellow card) 38'; Helland (yellow card) 58'; Lucumí (yellow card) 69'; Rowe 90+1'	Stadium: Stadio Diego Armando Maradona; Attendance: 47,000; Referee: Marco Piccinini

17 May 2026 37	Atalanta	0–1	Bologna	Bergamo
18:00 CEST (UTC+2)	Pašalić (yellow card) 77'	Report	Pobega (yellow card) 52'; Orsolini 78'	Stadium: Gewiss Stadium; Attendance: 22,140; Referee: Daniele Perenzoni

23 May 2026 38	Bologna	3–3	Internazionale	Bologna
18:00 CEST (UTC+2)	Bernardeschi 25'; Pobega 42'; Zieliński 48' (o.g.)	Report	Dimarco 22'; L. Martínez (yellow card) 41'; Esposito 64'; Mkhitaryan (yellow card) 77'; Diouf 86'	Stadium: Stadio Renato Dall'Ara; Attendance: 30,109; Referee: Kevin Bonacina

=== Coppa Italia ===
4 December 2025 Round of 16	Bologna	2–1	Parma	Bologna
18:00 CET (UTC+1)	Rowe 38'; Pobega (yellow card) 87'; Castro 89'	Report	Benedyczak 13'; Cremaschi (yellow card) 72'; Hernani (yellow card) 87'	Stadium: Stadio Renato Dall'Ara; Attendance: 15,301; Referee: Paride Tremolada

11 February 2026 Quarter-finals	Bologna	1–1 (1–4 p)	Lazio	Bologna
21:00 CET (UTC+1)	Castro 30', (yellow card) 47'; Miranda (yellow card) 74'; Vitík (yellow card) 90+1'	Report	Gila (yellow card) 9'; Noslin 48'; Tavares (yellow card) 86'	Stadium: Stadio Renato Dall'Ara; Attendance: 17,249; Referee: Daniele Chiffi
	Penalties
	Ferguson (penalty missed); Dallinga (penalty scored); Orsolini (penalty missed)		(penalty scored) Tavares; (penalty scored) Dia; (penalty scored) Marušić; (penalty scored) Taylor

=== Supercoppa Italiana ===
19 December 2025 Semi-finals	Bologna	1–1 (3–2 p)	Internazionale	Riyadh, Saudi Arabia
22:00 SAST (UTC+3)	Orsolini 35' (pen.)	Report	Thuram 2'	Stadium: King Saud University Stadium; Attendance: 16,591; Referee: Daniele Chiffi
	Penalties
	Ferguson (penalty scored); Moro (penalty missed); Miranda (penalty missed); Rowe (penalty scored); Immobile (penalty scored)		(penalty scored) L. Martínez; (penalty missed) Bastoni; (penalty missed) Barella; (penalty missed) Bonny; (penalty scored) De Vrij

22 December 2025 Final	Napoli	2–0	Bologna	Riyadh, Saudi Arabia
22:00 SAST (UTC+3)	Neres 39', 57'; Politano (yellow card) 79'	Report	Heggem (yellow card) 44'; Cambiaghi (yellow card) 50'; Holm (yellow card) 77'	Stadium: King Saud University Stadium; Attendance: 17,869; Referee: Andrea Colombo

=== UEFA Europa League ===
==== League phase ====
The draw for the league phase was held on 29 August 2025.

Pos	Team	Pld	W	D	L	GF	GA	GD	Pts	Qualification
8	(Italian Football Federation) Roma	8	5	1	2	13	6	+7	16	Advance to round of 16 (seeded)
9	(Royal Belgian Football Association) Genk	8	5	1	2	11	7	+4	16	Advance to knockout phase play-offs (seeded)
10	(Italian Football Federation) Bologna	8	4	3	1	14	7	+7	15	Advance to knockout phase play-offs (seeded)
11	(German Football Association) VfB Stuttgart	8	5	0	3	15	9	+6	15	Advance to knockout phase play-offs (seeded)
12	(Hungarian Football Federation) Ferencváros	8	4	3	1	12	11	+1	15	Advance to knockout phase play-offs (seeded)

Source: UEFA
Rules for classification: League phase tiebreakers

Round	1	2	3	4	5	6	7	8
Ground	A	H	A	H	H	A	H	A
Result	L	D	W	D	W	W	D	W
Position	28	27	18	24	18	13	15	10

Source: UEFA
A = Away; H = Home; W = Win; D = Draw; L = Loss

25 September 2025 1	Aston Villa (England)	1–0	(Italy) Bologna	Birmingham, England
20:00 BST (UTC+1)	McGinn 13', (yellow card) 71'; Cash (yellow card) 42'; Watkins (penalty missed) 68'	Report	Vitík (yellow card) 67'; Lucumí (yellow card) 67'	Stadium: Villa Park; Attendance: 30,909; Referee: Jesús Gil Manzano (Spain)

2 October 2025 2	Bologna (Italy)	1–1	(Germany) SC Freiburg	Bologna
18:45 CEST (UTC+2)	Orsolini 29'; Skorupski (yellow card) 54'; Holm (yellow card) 67'	Report	Makengo (yellow card) 47'; Adamu 57' (pen.); Lienhart (yellow card) 65'	Stadium: Stadio Renato Dall'Ara; Attendance: 24,428; Referee: Nenad Minaković (Serbia)

23 October 2025 3	FCSB (Romania)	1–2	(Italy) Bologna	Bucharest, Romania
19:45 EEST (UTC+3)	Miculescu (yellow card) 28'; Bîrligea 54', (yellow card) 76'; Popescu (yellow card) 87'; Radunović (yellow card) 90+1'	Report	Odgaard 9', (yellow card) 40'; Dallinga 12'; Heggem (yellow card) 16'; Rowe (yellow card) 26'; Cambiaghi (yellow card) 68'	Stadium: Arena Națională; Attendance: 27,643; Referee: Andris Treimanis (Latvia)

6 November 2025 4	Bologna (Italy)	0–0	(Norway) Brann	Bologna
21:00 CET (UTC+1)	Lykogiannis (red card) 23'; Miranda (yellow card) 41'; Ferguson (yellow card) 46'	Report	Helland (yellow card) 45+1'; Pedersen (yellow card) 85'	Stadium: Stadio Renato Dall'Ara; Attendance: 22,508; Referee: Daniel Schlager (Germany)

27 November 2025 5	Bologna (Italy)	4–1	(Austria) Red Bull Salzburg	Bologna
21:00 CET (UTC+1)	Odgaard 26'; Dallinga 51'; Bernardeschi 53'; Orsolini 86'	Report	Vertessen 33', (yellow card) 43'; Yeo (yellow card) 46'	Stadium: Stadio Renato Dall'Ara; Attendance: 21,025; Referee: Igor Pajač (Croatia)

11 December 2025 6	Celta Vigo (Spain)	1–2	(Italy) Bologna	Vigo, Spain
21:00 CET (UTC+1)	Zaragoza 17'; Radu (yellow card) 87'; Rueda (yellow card) 90+2'; Moriba (yellow card) 90+6'	Report	Bernardeschi 66' (pen.), 74'; Holm (yellow card) 84'	Stadium: Balaídos; Attendance: 20,302; Referee: Radu Petrescu (Romania)

22 January 2026 7	Bologna (Italy)	2–2	(Scotland) Celtic	Bologna
18:45 CET (UTC+1)	Miranda (yellow card) 39'; Dallinga 58'; Rowe 72'	Report	Maeda (yellow card) 27'; Hatate 6', (yellow card) 31' (yellow-red card) 34'; Trusty 40'	Stadium: Stadio Renato Dall'Ara; Attendance: 23,791; Referee: Vasilios Fotias (Greece)

29 January 2026 8	Maccabi Tel Aviv (Israel)	0–3	(Italy) Bologna	Bačka Topola, Serbia
21:00 CET (UTC+1)	Shlomo (yellow card) 15'	Report	Rowe 35'; Orsolini 47'; Pobega 90+4'	Stadium: TSC Arena; Attendance: 81; Referee: Goga Kikacheishvili (Georgia)
Note: Due to the Gaza war, Israeli teams were required to play their home matches at neutral venues until further notice.

==== Knockout phase ====
===== Knockout phase play-offs =====
The draw for the knockout phase play-offs was held on 30 January 2026.

19 February 2026 First leg	Brann (Norway)	0–1	(Italy) Bologna	Bergen, Norway
18:45 CET (UTC+1)	Boakye (yellow card) 30'	Report	Castro 9'; Bernardeschi (yellow card) 14'	Stadium: Brann Stadion; Attendance: 15,680; Referee: Rade Obrenović (Slovenia)

26 February 2026 Second leg	Bologna (Italy)	1–0 (2–0 agg.)	(Norway) Brann	Bologna
21:00 CET (UTC+1)	Vitík (yellow card) 28'; Bernardeschi (yellow card) 41'; João Mário 56'; Orsolini (yellow card) 80'	Report	Sørensen (red card) 37'; Holten (yellow card) 78'	Stadium: Stadio Renato Dall'Ara; Attendance: 19,710; Referee: Benoît Bastien (France)

===== Round of 16 =====
The draw for the round of 16 was held on 27 February 2026.

12 March 2026 First leg	Bologna (Italy)	1–1	(Italy) Roma	Bologna
18:45 CET (UTC+1)	Miranda (yellow card) 13'; João Mário (yellow card) 47'; Bernardeschi 50'; Casale (yellow card) 57'	Report	Wesley (yellow card) 15'; Cristante (yellow card) 67'; Pellegrini 71'	Stadium: Stadio Renato Dall'Ara; Attendance: 26,277; Referee: Sven Jablonski (Germany)

19 March 2026 Second leg	Roma (Italy)	3–4 (a.e.t.) (4–5 agg.)	(Italy) Bologna	Rome
21:00 CET (UTC+1)	Ndicka 32'; Çelik (yellow card) 55'; Malen 69' (pen.); Pellegrini 80'; Mancini (yellow card) 120+3'	Report	Rowe 22'; Vitík (yellow card) 26'; Bernardeschi 45+2' (pen.); Castro 58'; Zortea (yellow card) 71'; Lucumí (yellow card) 76'; Freuler (yellow card) 108'; Cambiaghi 111'; Ferguson (yellow card) 116'	Stadium: Stadio Olimpico; Attendance: 63,908; Referee: István Kovács (Romania)

===== Quarter-finals =====
The draw for the quarter-finals was held on 27 February 2026, after the draw for the round of 16.

9 April 2026 First leg	Bologna (Italy)	1–3	(England) Aston Villa	Bologna
21:00 CEST (UTC+2)	Lucumí (yellow card) 14'; Pobega (yellow card) 65'; Rowe 90'	Report	Konsa 44'; Watkins 51', 90+4'; Rogers (yellow card) 85'	Stadium: Stadio Renato Dall'Ara; Attendance: 31,142; Referee: Sandro Schärer (Switzerland)

16 April 2026 Second leg	Aston Villa (England)	4–0 (7–1 agg.)	(Italy) Bologna	Birmingham, England
20:00 BST (UTC+1)	Watkins 16'; Rogers (penalty missed) 25', 39'; Buendía 26'; Konsa 89'	Report	Bernardeschi (yellow card) 29'	Stadium: Villa Park; Attendance: 41,662; Referee: José María Sánchez Martínez (Spain)
