= 2024–25 Bologna FC 1909 season =

Bologna
2024–25 season
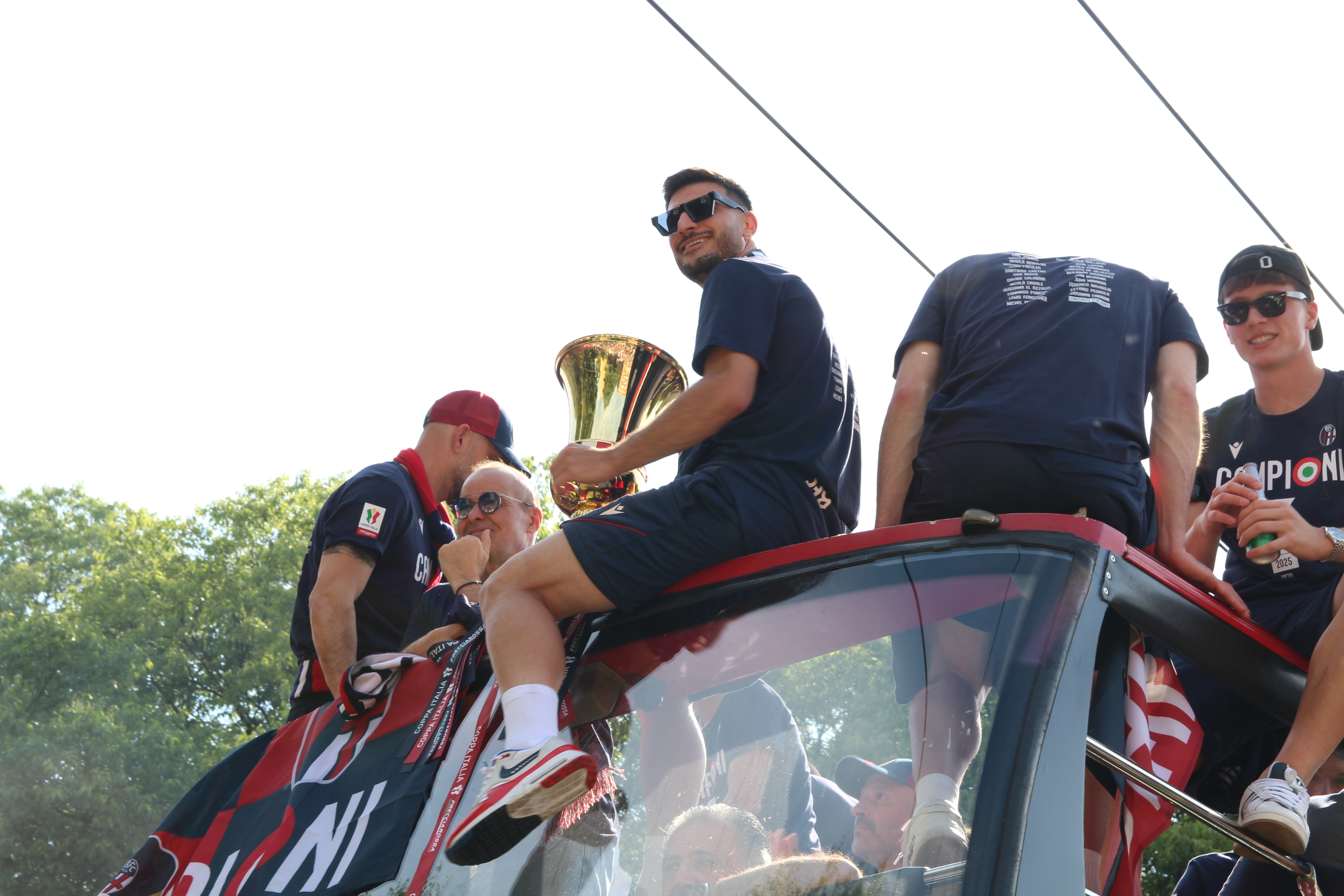
- The squad celebrates the Coppa Italia
- Owner: BFC 1909 Lux SPV S.A. (Saputo)
- Chairman: Joey Saputo
- Head coach: Vincenzo Italiano
- Stadium: Stadio Renato Dall'Ara
- Serie A: 9th
- Coppa Italia: Winners
- UEFA Champions League: League phase
- Top goalscorer: League: Riccardo Orsolini (15); All: Riccardo Orsolini (17)
- Highest home attendance: 38,279 vs Internazionale; 20 April 2025, Serie A
- Lowest home attendance: 11,952 vs Monza; 3 December 2024, Coppa Italia
- Average home league attendance: 28,007
- Biggest win: 5–0 vs Lazio (H); 16 March 2025, Serie A
- Biggest defeat: 0–3 vs Napoli (A); 25 August 2024, Serie A 0–3 vs Lazio (A); 24 November 2024, Serie A
Home colours	Away colours	Third colours

The 2024–25 season was the 116th season in the history of Bologna Football Club 1909, and the club's tenth consecutive season in the Serie A. In addition to the domestic league, the club participated in the Coppa Italia and the UEFA Champions League, having made its last appearance in Europe's top club competition in the 1964–65 season.

On 14 May 2025, Bologna defeated Milan 1–0 in the Coppa Italia final, winning a first major trophy since 1974.

== Players ==
=== First-team squad ===
As of 4 February 2025

Note: Flags indicate national team as defined under FIFA eligibility rules; some limited exceptions apply. Players may hold more than one non-FIFA nationality.

No.	Pos.	Nation	Player
1	GK	POL	Łukasz Skorupski
2	DF	SWE	Emil Holm
5	DF	CRO	Martin Erlić
6	MF	CRO	Nikola Moro
7	FW	ITA	Riccardo Orsolini (3rd captain)
8	MF	SUI	Remo Freuler (4th captain)
9	FW	ARG	Santiago Castro
11	FW	SUI	Dan Ndoye
14	DF	ITA	Davide Calabria (on loan from Milan)
15	DF	ITA	Nicolò Casale (on loan from Lazio)
17	MF	MAR	Oussama El Azzouzi
18	MF	ITA	Tommaso Pobega (on loan from Milan)
19	MF	SCO	Lewis Ferguson (captain)
20	MF	SUI	Michel Aebischer

No.	Pos.	Nation	Player
21	FW	DEN	Jens Odgaard
22	DF	GRE	Charalampos Lykogiannis
23	GK	ITA	Nicola Bagnolini
24	FW	NED	Thijs Dallinga
26	DF	COL	Jhon Lucumí
28	FW	ITA	Nicolò Cambiaghi
29	DF	ITA	Lorenzo De Silvestri (vice-captain)
30	FW	ARG	Benjamín Domínguez
31	DF	NED	Sam Beukema (5th captain)
33	DF	ESP	Juan Miranda
34	GK	ITA	Federico Ravaglia
80	MF	ITA	Giovanni Fabbian
39	FW	ESP	Estanis Pedrola (on loan from Sampdoria)

=== Out on loan ===
As of 3 February 2025

Note: Flags indicate national team as defined under FIFA eligibility rules; some limited exceptions apply. Players may hold more than one non-FIFA nationality.

No.	Pos.	Nation	Player
—	DF	ITA	Kevin Bonifazi (at Sassuolo until 30 June 2025)
—	DF	ITA	Tommaso Corazza (at Salernitana until 30 June 2025)
—	DF	SRB	Mihajlo Ilić (at Partizan until 30 June 2025)
—	DF	ITA	Mattia Motolese (at Latina until 30 June 2025)
—	DF	AUT	Stefan Posch (at Atalanta until 30 June 2025)
—	DF	URU	Joaquín Sosa (at Reggiana until 30 June 2025)
—	DF	ITA	Riccardo Stivanello (at Juventus Next Gen until 30 June 2025)
—	MF	FIN	Niklas Pyyhtiä (at Südtirol until 30 June 2025)

No.	Pos.	Nation	Player
—	MF	ITA	Manuel Rosetti (at Sestri Levante until 30 June 2025)
—	MF	POL	Kacper Urbański (at Monza until 30 June 2025)
—	FW	ITA	Gianmarco Cangiano (at Pescara until 30 June 2025)
—	FW	ITA	Gennaro Anatriello (at Trapani until 30 June 2025)
—	FW	SWE	Jesper Karlsson (at Lecce until 30 June 2025)
—	FW	ITA	Andrea Mazia (at Varesina until 30 June 2025)
—	FW	NGR	Orji Okwonkwo (at Cittadella until 30 June 2025)
—	FW	ITA	Antonio Raimondo (at Salernitana until 30 June 2025)

== Transfers ==
=== Summer window ===
==== In ====
Date	Pos.	Player	From	Fee	Notes	Ref.
1 July 2024	MF	(Switzerland) Remo Freuler	(England) Nottingham Forest	€4,500,000	Loan made permanent	
1 July 2024	DF	(Sweden) Emil Holm	(Italy) Spezia	€7,000,000		
1 July 2024	MF	(Denmark) Jens Odgaard	(Netherlands) AZ	€4,280,000	Loan made permanent	
1 July 2024	MF	(Finland) Niklas Pyyhtiä	(Italy) Ternana	Free	Loan return	
3 July 2024	DF	(Spain) Juan Miranda	(Spain) Real Betis	Free		
12 July 2024	FW	(Italy) Nicolò Cambiaghi	(Italy) Atalanta	€10,000,000		
23 July 2024	FW	(Netherlands) Thijs Dallinga	(France) Toulouse	€15,000,000		
2 August 2024	DF	(Croatia) Martin Erlić	(Italy) Sassuolo	€7,000,000		
28 August 2024	FW	(Argentina) Benjamín Domínguez	(Argentina) Gimnasia LP	€4,500,000		

==== Loans in ====
Date	Pos.	Player	From	Fee	Notes	Ref.
24 August 2024	MF	(Italy) Tommaso Pobega	(Italy) Milan	Free	Option to buy for €15,000,000	
27 August 2024	FW	(England) Samuel Iling-Junior	(England) Aston Villa	Free		
30 August 2024	DF	(Italy) Nicolò Casale	(Italy) Lazio	€1,500,000	Obligation to buy for €7,500,000 under conditions	

==== Out ====
Date	Pos.	Player	To	Fee	Notes	Ref.
30 June 2024	DF	(Denmark) Victor Kristiansen	(England) Leicester City	Free	End of loan	
30 June 2024	MF	(Belgium) Alexis Saelemaekers	(Italy) Milan	Free	End of loan	
1 July 2024	DF	(Ghana) Ebenezer Annan	(Serbia) Novi Pazar	€350,000		
1 July 2024	FW	(Austria) Marko Arnautović	(Italy) Internazionale	€10,900,000	Loan made permanent	
1 July 2024	DF	(England) Luis Binks	(England) Coventry City	€3,800,000	Loan made permanent	
1 July 2024	DF	(France) Adama Soumaoro	Unattached	Free	End of contract	
14 July 2024	FW	(Netherlands) Joshua Zirkzee	(England) Manchester United	€42,500,000		
29 July 2024	DF	(Italy) Riccardo Calafiori	(England) Arsenal	€45,000,000		
8 August 2024	FW	(Italy) Mattia Pagliuca	(Italy) Virtus Verona	Free		
9 August 2024	FW	(Netherlands) Sydney van Hooijdonk	(Italy) Cesena	Free		
23 August 2024	MF	(Sweden) Demirel Hodžić	(Italy) Milan Futuro	€300,000	From Primavera squad	
7 September 2024	GK	(Albania) Marco Molla	(Albania) Laçi	Free		

==== Loans out ====
Date	Pos.	Player	To	Fee	Notes	Ref.
15 July 2024	DF	(Italy) Mattia Motolese	(Italy) Carrarese	Free		
25 July 2024	FW	(Italy) Gennaro Anatriello	(Italy) Messina	Free		
8 August 2024	FW	(Italy) Antonio Raimondo	(Italy) Venezia	Free		
30 August 2024	DF	(Italy) Kevin Bonifazi	(Italy) Lecce	Free	Option to buy for €500,000	
2 September 2024	FW	(Italy) Andrea Mazia	(Italy) Varesina	Free		
12 September 2024	DF	(Serbia) Mihajlo Ilić	(Serbia) Partizan	Free		

=== Winter window ===
==== In ====
Date	Pos.	Player	From	Fee	Notes	Ref.
31 December 2024	MF	(Iceland) Andri Baldursson	(Sweden) IF Elfsborg	End of loan		
31 December 2024	DF	(Uruguay) Joaquín Sosa	(Canada) Montréal	End of loan		
8 January 2025	FW	(Italy) Antonio Raimondo	(Italy) Venezia	Loan terminated early		
15 January 2025	FW	(Nigeria) Orji Okwonkwo	(Italy) Reggiana	Loan terminated early		
16 January 2025	FW	(Italy) Gennaro Anatriello	(Italy) Messina	Loan terminated early		
22 January 2025	DF	(Italy) Mattia Motolese	(Italy) Carrarese	Loan terminated early		

==== Loans in ====
Date	Pos.	Player	From	Fee	Notes	Ref.
3 February 2025	DF	(Italy) Davide Calabria	(Italy) Milan	Free		
3 February 2025	FW	(Spain) Estanis Pedrola	(Italy) Sampdoria	€500,000	Option to buy for an undisclosed fee	

==== Out ====
Date	Pos.	Player	To	Fee	Notes	Ref.
2 February 2025	FW	(England) Samuel Iling-Junior	(England) Aston Villa	Loan terminated early		
3 February 2025	DF	(Italy) Kevin Bonifazi	(Italy) Lecce	€500,000	Loan transfer made permanent	

==== Loans out ====
Date	Pos.	Player	To	Fee	Notes	Ref.
4 January 2025	FW	(Sweden) Jesper Karlsson	(Italy) Lecce	Free		
7 January 2025	MF	(Finland) Niklas Pyyhtiä	(Italy) Südtirol	Free	Option to buy for an undisclosed fee and buy-back clause for an undisclosed fee	
9 January 2025	DF	(Italy) Tommaso Corazza	(Italy) Salernitana	Free		
9 January 2025	FW	(Italy) Antonio Raimondo	(Italy) Salernitana	Free		
16 January 2025	FW	(Nigeria) Orji Okwonkwo	(Italy) Cittadella	Free		
17 January 2025	FW	(Italy) Gennaro Anatriello	(Italy) Trapani	Free		
23 January 2025	DF	(Italy) Mattia Motolese	(Italy) Latina	Free		
26 January 2025	MF	(Poland) Kacper Urbański	(Italy) Monza	Free		
3 February 2025	DF	(Austria) Stefan Posch	(Italy) Atalanta	€1,000,000	Option to buy for €7,000,000	

== Friendlies ==
=== Pre-season ===
24 July 2024 Friendly	Bologna	2–0	Brixen	La Roca del Vallès, Spain
18:00 CEST (UTC+2)	Byar 35'; Fabbian 45'	Report		Stadium: Camp de Futbol de La Roca del Vallès; Referee: Marco Cazzavillan (Italy)

27 July 2024 Friendly	Bologna	5–0	Caldiero	Mühlbach
17:00 CEST (UTC+2)	Castro 11', 41'; Orsolini 40'; Dallinga 52'; Posch 59'	Report		Stadium: Sports Centre Field; Referee: Francesco Gallo

31 July 2024 Friendly	Bologna	3–3	Asteras Tripolis	Brixen
17:00 CEST (UTC+2)	Castro 13'; Cambiaghi 16'; Orsolini 63'	Report	Bartolo 5'; Kaltsas (yellow card) 42'; Miki 51'; Ádám 72'; Alagbe (yellow card) 83'	Stadium: Raiffeisen Arena; Referee: Luca Zufferli (Italy)

3 August 2024 Friendly	VfL Bochum	4–0	Bologna	Bolzano
18:15 CEST (UTC+2)	Sissoko 6'; Broschinski 9', 49'; De Wit 54'	Report		Stadium: Stadio Druso; Referee: Andrea Copelli (Italy)
Note: The match was played in two periods of thirty minutes each.

3 August 2024 Friendly	Bologna	1–0	Südtirol	Bolzano
19:30 CEST (UTC+2)	Erlić 15'	Report		Stadium: Stadio Druso; Referee: David Kovacevic
Note: The match was played in two periods of thirty minutes each.

10 August 2024 Trofeu Ciutat de Palma	Mallorca	1–1 (5–6 p)	Bologna	Palma, Spain
20:30 CEST (UTC+2)	Asano 9'	Report	Castro 25'	Stadium: Estadi Mallorca Son Moix; Referee: López García (Spain)
	Penalties
	Muriqi (penalty missed); Sánchez (penalty scored); Luna (penalty scored); Rodríguez (penalty scored); Mascarell (penalty scored); Maffeo (penalty scored); Lato (penalty missed)		(penalty scored) Orsolini; (penalty scored) Dallinga; (penalty scored) Posch; (penalty missed) Freuler; (penalty scored) Fabbian; (penalty scored) Beukema; (penalty scored) Corazza

== Competitions ==
=== Overall record ===
Competition	First match	Last match	Starting round	Final position	Record							
Competition	First match	Last match	Starting round	Final position	Pld	W	D	L	GF	GA	GD	Win %
Serie A	18 August 2024	24 May 2025	Matchday 1	9th	38	16	14	8	57	47	+10	42.11
Coppa Italia	3 December 2024	14 May 2025	Round of 16	Winners	5	5	0	0	11	1	+10	100.00
UEFA Champions League	18 September 2024	29 January 2025	League phase	League phase	8	1	3	4	4	9	−5	12.50
Total					51	22	17	12	72	57	+15	43.14

Source: Soccerway

=== Serie A ===
==== League table ====
Pos	Team	Pld	W	D	L	GF	GA	GD	Pts	Qualification or relegation
7	Lazio	38	18	11	9	61	49	+12	65 (Note: Fiorentina finished ahead of Lazio on head-to-head points: Fiorentina 2–1 Lazio, Lazio 1–2 Fiorentina.)	
8	Milan	38	18	9	11	61	43	+18	63	
9	Bologna	38	16	14	8	57	47	+10	62	Qualification for the Europa League league phase (Note: Bologna qualified for the Europa League league stage as the winners of the 2024–25 Coppa Italia.)
10	Como	38	13	10	15	49	52	−3	49	
11	Torino	38	10	14	14	39	45	−6	44 (Note: Torino finished ahead of Udinese on head-to-head points: Udinese 2–2 Torino, Torino 2–0 Udinese.)	

Source: Serie A
Rules for classification: 1) Points; 2) Tiebreaker for Champions team and third relegated team; 3) Head-to-head points; 4) Head-to-head goal difference; 5) Goal difference; 6) Goals scored; 7) Draw.
(Note: Head-to-head record is used only after all the matches between the teams in question have been played)

==== Results summary ====
Overall								Home						Away					
Pld	W	D	L	GF	GA	GD	Pts	W	D	L	GF	GA	GD	W	D	L	GF	GA	GD
38	16	14	8	57	47	+10	62	10	7	2	33	18	+15	6	7	6	24	29	−5

Source: Serie A

==== Results by round ====
Round	1	2	3	4	5	6	7	8	10	11	12	13	14	15	16	17	18	20	19^{1}	21	22	23	24	25	26	9^{2}	27	28	29	30	31	32	33	34	35	36	37	38
Ground	H	A	H	A	A	H	H	A	A	H	A	A	H	A	H	A	H	H	A	H	A	H	A	H	A	H	H	A	H	A	H	A	H	A	H	A	A	H
Result	D	L	D	D	W	D	D	D	W	W	W	L	W	D	W	W	L	D	D	W	D	W	D	W	L	W	W	W	W	W	D	L	W	D	D	L	L	L
Position	9	18	18	17	13	13	13	12	11	9	8	8	8	8	7	7	7	7	8	7	8	7	8	8	8	6	6	6	4	4	4	5	4	5	7	7	8	9
Points	1	1	2	3	6	7	8	9	12	15	18	18	21	22	25	28	28	29	30	33	34	37	38	41	41	44	47	50	53	56	57	57	60	61	62	62	62	62

Source: Serie A
A = Away; H = Home; W = Win; D = Draw; L = Loss

^{1} Matchday 19 (vs Internazionale) was postponed due to Internazionale's participation in the Supercoppa Italiana.
^{2} Matchday 9 (vs Milan) was postponed due to heavy rain and flooding.

==== Matches ====
The match schedule was released on 4 July 2024.

18 August 2024 1	Bologna	1–1	Udinese	Bologna
18:30 CEST (UTC+2)	Orsolini 57' (pen.)	Report	Okoye (yellow card) 32'; Giannetti (yellow card) 55', (goal) 68'; Thauvin (penalty missed) 68'; Ehizibue (yellow card) 81'; Lucca (yellow card) 90+5'	Stadium: Stadio Renato Dall'Ara; Attendance: 26,418; Referee: Maria Sole Ferrieri Caputi

25 August 2024 2	Napoli	3–0	Bologna	Naples
20:45 CEST (UTC+2)	Mazzocchi (yellow card) 43'; Di Lorenzo 45+2'; Rrahmani (yellow card) 56'; Kvaratskhelia 75'; Simeone 90+4'	Report	Lucumí (yellow card) 49'; Posch (yellow card) 50'	Stadium: Stadio Diego Armando Maradona; Attendance: 45,000; Referee: Luca Pairetto

31 August 2024 3	Bologna	1–1	Empoli	Bologna
18:30 CEST (UTC+2)	Fabbian 2'	Report	Gyasi 3'; Pezzella (yellow card) 55'; Vásquez (yellow card) 90+4'; Henderson (yellow card) 90+5'	Stadium: Stadio Renato Dall'Ara; Attendance: 25,960; Referee: Livio Marinelli

14 September 2024 4	Como	2–2	Bologna	Como
15:00 CEST (UTC+2)	Casale 5' (o.g.); Iovine (yellow card) 45'; Moreno (yellow card) 45+4'; Cutrone 53'	Report	Pobega (yellow card) 72'; Castro 76'; Iling-Junior 90+1'	Stadium: Stadio Giuseppe Sinigaglia; Attendance: 10,500; Referee: Marco Piccinini

22 September 2024 5	Monza	1–2	Bologna	Monza
15:00 CEST (UTC+2)	Carboni (yellow card) 18'; Izzo (yellow card) 42'; Đurić 43'; Marí (yellow card) 85'	Report	Urbański 24'; Lucumí (yellow card) 51'; Castro 80', (yellow card) 86'	Stadium: Stadio Brianteo; Attendance: 9,991; Referee: Davide Massa

28 September 2024 6	Bologna	1–1	Atalanta	Bologna
20:45 CEST (UTC+2)	Freuler (yellow card) 1'; Fabbian (yellow card) 35'; Castro 46'; Lucumí (red card) 51'; Skorupski (yellow card) 79'	Report	Bellanova (yellow card) 29'; Kossounou (yellow card) 33'; Éderson (yellow card) 73'; Samardžić 90'	Stadium: Stadio Renato Dall'Ara; Attendance: 27,126; Referee: Antonio Rapuano

6 October 2024 7	Bologna	0–0	Parma	Bologna
15:00 CEST (UTC+2)	Urbański (yellow card) 84'	Report	Coulibaly (red card) 52'	Stadium: Stadio Renato Dall'Ara; Attendance: 28,461; Referee: Marco Di Bello

19 October 2024 8	Genoa	2–2	Bologna	Genoa
15:00 CEST (UTC+2)	Martín (yellow card) 64'; Pinamonti 73', 85', (yellow card) 86'	Report	Orsolini 37'; Odgaard 56'	Stadium: Stadio Luigi Ferraris; Attendance: 30,952; Referee: Daniele Doveri

29 October 2024 10	Cagliari	0–2	Bologna	Cagliari
18:30 CET (UTC+1)	Palomino (yellow card) 39'; Zappa (yellow card) 75'	Report	Orsolini 35'; Odgaard 51'; Pobega (yellow card) 71'; Fabbian (yellow card) 88'	Stadium: Unipol Domus; Attendance: 15,977; Referee: Francesco Fourneau

2 November 2024 11	Bologna	1–0	Lecce	Bologna
15:00 CET (UTC+1)	Urbański (yellow card) 66'; Ndoye (yellow card) 72'; Orsolini 85'	Report	Pelmard (yellow card) 71'; Gaspar (yellow card) 86'	Stadium: Stadio Renato Dall'Ara; Attendance: 25,000; Referee: Giuseppe Collu

10 November 2024 12	Roma	2–3	Bologna	Rome
15:00 CET (UTC+1)	El Shaarawy 63', 82', (yellow card) 90+6'; Mancini (yellow card) 87'	Report	Castro 25'; De Silvestri (yellow card) 45'; Orsolini 66'; Miranda (yellow card) 68'; Karlsson 77', (yellow card) 87'	Stadium: Stadio Olimpico; Attendance: 60,681; Referee: Gianluca Manganiello

24 November 2024 13	Lazio	3–0	Bologna	Rome
20:45 CET (UTC+1)	Gigot (yellow card) 63', (goal) 68'; Zaccagni 72'; Tchaouna (yellow card) 84'; Pellegrini (yellow card) 90+1'; Dele-Bashiru 90+2'	Report	Pobega (yellow card) 23' (yellow-red card) 35'; Holm (yellow card) 90+1'	Stadium: Stadio Olimpico; Attendance: 40,000; Referee: Antonio Rapuano

30 November 2024 14	Bologna	3–0	Venezia	Bologna
20:45 CET (UTC+1)	Ndoye 21' (pen.), 71'; Orsolini 69' (pen.)	Report	Šverko (yellow card) 26'; Busio (yellow card) 29'	Stadium: Stadio Renato Dall'Ara; Attendance: 24,866; Referee: Luca Massimi

7 December 2024 15	Juventus	2–2	Bologna	Turin
18:00 CET (UTC+1)	Weah (yellow card) 18'; Koopmeiners 62'; Kalulu (yellow card) 72'; Vlahović (yellow card) 83'; Mbangula 90+2'	Report	Ndoye 30'; Odgaard (yellow card) 32'; Pobega 52'; Castro (yellow card) 76'; Holm (yellow card) 78'; Lucumí (yellow card) 83'	Stadium: Juventus Stadium; Attendance: 40,748; Referee: Matteo Marchetti

15 December 2024 16	Bologna	1–0	Fiorentina	Bologna
15:00 CET (UTC+1)	Pobega (yellow card) 13'; Odgaard 59'; Lykogiannis (yellow card) 82'	Report	Dodô (yellow card) 16'; Comuzzo (yellow card) 89'	Stadium: Stadio Renato Dall'Ara; Attendance: 27,970; Referee: Michael Fabbri

21 December 2024 17	Torino	0–2	Bologna	Turin
15:00 CET (UTC+1)		Report	Castro (penalty missed) 8'; Dallinga 71'; Miranda (yellow card) 74'; Pobega 80'; Freuler (yellow card) 85'	Stadium: Stadio Olimpico Grande Torino; Attendance: 19,860; Referee: Marco Piccinini

30 December 2024 18	Bologna	2–3	Hellas Verona	Bologna
20:45 CET (UTC+1)	Domínguez 20', 58'; Pobega (red card) 51'; Castro (yellow card) 85'; Lucumí (yellow card) 87'	Report	Sarr 38'; Dawidowicz (yellow card) 44'; Tengstedt 45+2'; Suslov (yellow card) 54'; Coppola (yellow card) 57'; Ghilardi (yellow card) 62'; Tchatchoua (yellow card) 68'; Castro 88' (o.g.)	Stadium: Stadio Renato Dall'Ara; Attendance: 26,484; Referee: Giovanni Ayroldi

12 January 2025 20	Bologna	2–2	Roma	Bologna
18:00 CET (UTC+1)	Miranda (yellow card) 32'; Dallinga 61', (yellow card) 77'; Ferguson 65' (pen.); Holm (yellow card) 70'; Lucumí (yellow card) 90+5'	Report	Saelemaekers 58'; Mancini (yellow card) 90+4'; Dovbyk 90+8' (pen.)	Stadium: Stadio Renato Dall'Ara; Attendance: 30,226; Referee: Rosario Abisso

15 January 2025 19	Internazionale	2–2	Bologna	Milan
20:45 CET (UTC+1)	Dumfries 19'; L. Martínez 45+1'	Report	Castro 15'; Holm 64'	Stadium: San Siro; Attendance: 63,074; Referee: Luca Pairetto
Note: The match was originally scheduled for 5 January 2025, but was postponed due to Internazionale's participation in the Supercoppa Italiana.

18 January 2025 21	Bologna	3–1	Monza	Bologna
15:00 CET (UTC+1)	Castro 22', (yellow card) 45+1'; Odgaard 34'; Orsolini 69'	Report	Maldini 4'; Akpa Akpro (yellow card) 24'; Kyriakopoulos (yellow card) 36'; Izzo (yellow card) 90+4'	Stadium: Stadio Renato Dall'Ara; Attendance: 23,381; Referee: Maurizio Mariani

25 January 2025 22	Empoli	1–1	Bologna	Empoli
20:45 CET (UTC+1)	Colombo 24'; Henderson (yellow card) 36'; Grassi (yellow card) 40'; Pezzella (yellow card) 78'	Report	Domínguez 44'	Stadium: Stadio Carlo Castellani; Attendance: 10,321; Referee: Federico La Penna

1 February 2025 23	Bologna	2–0	Como	Bologna
20:45 CET (UTC+1)	De Silvestri 25'; Lykogiannis (yellow card) 28'; Ndoye (yellow card) 47'; Fabbian 66'; Freuler (yellow card) 90+1'	Report	Perrone (yellow card) 9'; Fadera (yellow card) 38', (red card) 38'; Caqueret (yellow card) 45'; Diao (yellow card) 65'	Stadium: Stadio Renato Dall'Ara; Attendance: 26,492; Referee: Luca Massimi

9 February 2025 24	Lecce	0–0	Bologna	Lecce
18:00 CET (UTC+1)		Report	Freuler (yellow card) 61'; Pobega (yellow card) 90+3'	Stadium: Stadio Via del mare Attendance: 24,910; Referee: Francesco Fourneau

14 February 2025 25	Bologna	3–2	Torino	Bologna
20:45 CET (UTC+1)	Ndoye 20', 70' (pen.); Biraghi 90' (o.g.)	Report	Vlašić 37'; Linetty (yellow card) 52'; Karamoh (yellow card) 61'; Gineitis (yellow card) 63'; Elmas 65'; Masina (yellow card) 90+4'	Stadium: Stadio Renato Dall'Ara; Attendance: 24,274; Referee: Michael Fabbri

22 February 2025 26	Parma	2–0	Bologna	Parma
15:00 CET (UTC+1)	Bonny 37' (pen.); Almqvist (yellow card) 47'; Cancellieri (yellow card) 50'; Sohm 79'	Report	Calabria (yellow card) 68'	Stadium: Stadio Ennio Tardini; Attendance: 19,510; Referee: Rosario Abisso

26 February 2025 9	Bologna	2–1	Milan	Bologna
18:30 CET (UTC+1)	Castro 48'; Casale (yellow card) 53'; Ndoye 82'	Report	Leão 43'; Hernandez (yellow card) 47'; Thiaw (yellow card) 54'	Stadium: Stadio Renato Dall'Ara; Attendance: 31,784; Referee: Maurizio Mariani
Note: The match was originally scheduled for 26 October 2024, but was postponed due to heavy rain and flooding.

2 March 2025 27	Bologna	2–1	Cagliari	Bologna
15:00 CET (UTC+1)	Orsolini 48' (pen.), 56'; Freuler (yellow card) 84'	Report	Piccoli 22'; Obert (yellow card) 29'; Makoumbou (yellow card) 77'	Stadium: Stadio Renato Dall'Ara; Attendance: 25,676; Referee: Luca Zufferli

9 March 2025 28	Hellas Verona	1–2	Bologna	Verona
12:30 CET (UTC+1)	Valentini (yellow card) 10' (yellow-red card) 70'; Suslov (yellow card) 57'; Mosquera 80'	Report	Odgaard 40'; Moro (yellow card) 41'; Cambiaghi 78'	Stadium: Stadio Marcantonio Bentegodi; Attendance: 24,612; Referee: Antonio Rapuano

16 March 2025 29	Bologna	5–0	Lazio	Bologna
15:00 CET (UTC+1)	Odgaard 16'; Freuler (yellow card) 33'; Orsolini 48'; Ndoye 49'; Castro 74', (yellow card) 76'; Fabbian 84'	Report	Gila (yellow card) 44'; Vecino (yellow card) 57'; Romagnoli (yellow card) 90+1'	Stadium: Stadio Renato Dall'Ara; Attendance: 30,846; Referee: Andrea Colombo

29 March 2025 30	Venezia	0–1	Bologna	Venice
15:00 CET (UTC+1)	Zerbin (yellow card) 22'; Pérez (yellow card) 61'; Condé (yellow card) 78'; Idzes (yellow card) 90+2'	Report	Calabria (yellow card) 25'; Orsolini 49'	Stadium: Stadio Pier Luigi Penzo; Attendance: 9,864; Referee: Marco Di Bello

7 April 2025 31	Bologna	1–1	Napoli	Bologna
20:45 CEST (UTC+2)	Ndoye 64'; Aebischer (yellow card) 90+2'	Report	Zambo Anguissa 18', (yellow card) 89'; Di Lorenzo (yellow card) 60'; Olivera (yellow card) 79'	Stadium: Stadio Renato Dall'Ara; Attendance: 31,974; Referee: Davide Massa

13 April 2025 32	Atalanta	2–0	Bologna	Bergamo
12:30 CEST (UTC+2)	Retegui 3', (yellow card) 60'; Hien (yellow card) 7'; Pašalić 21'; Zappacosta (yellow card) 34'; Tolói (yellow card) 66'	Report	Miranda (yellow card) 90+3'	Stadium: Gewiss Stadium; Attendance: 23,156; Referee: Maurizio Mariani

20 April 2025 33	Bologna	1–0	Internazionale	Bologna
18:00 CEST (UTC+2)	Ndoye (yellow card) 58'; Orsolini 90+4', (yellow card) 90+6'	Report	Mkhitaryan (yellow card) 39'; Bastoni (yellow card) 61'; Correa (yellow card) 81'	Stadium: Stadio Renato Dall'Ara; Attendance: 38,279; Referee: Andrea Colombo

28 April 2025 34	Udinese	0–0	Bologna	Udine
18:30 CEST (UTC+2)	Payero (yellow card) 66'; Karlström (yellow card) 70'; Ehizibue (yellow card) 90'	Report	Beukema (yellow card) 50'; Lucumí (yellow card) 85'	Stadium: Stadio Friuli; Attendance: 23,414; Referee: Fabio Maresca

4 May 2025 35	Bologna	1–1	Juventus	Bologna
20:45 CEST (UTC+2)	Freuler 54'; Castro (yellow card) 90+4'	Report	Thuram 9'; Locatelli (yellow card) 48'; González (yellow card) 74'; Costa (yellow card) 90+2'	Stadium: Stadio Renato Dall'Ara; Attendance: 32,468; Referee: Daniele Doveri

9 May 2025 36	Milan	3–1	Bologna	Milan
20:45 CEST (UTC+2)	Loftus-Cheek (yellow card) 60'; Félix (yellow card) 67'; Giménez 73', 90+2'; Pulisic 79'	Report	Lucumí (yellow card) 37'; Orsolini 49'; Castro (yellow card) 90+1'	Stadium: San Siro; Attendance: 71,076; Referee: Livio Marinelli

18 May 2025 37	Fiorentina	3–2	Bologna	Florence
20:45 CEST (UTC+2)	Parisi 13', (yellow card) 77'; Ranieri (yellow card) 20'; Gosens (yellow card) 65'; Richardson 67'; Kean 84'; Mandragora (yellow card) 90'	Report	Dallinga 61'; Ndoye (yellow card) 77'; Orsolini 79'; Miranda (red card) 88'	Stadium: Stadio Artemio Franchi; Attendance: 21,280; Referee: Luca Zufferli

24 May 2025 38	Bologna	1–3	Genoa	Bologna
18:00 CEST (UTC+2)	Aebischer (yellow card) 38'; Lykogiannis (yellow card) 52'; Orsolini 64', (yellow card) 79'; Calabria (yellow card) 87'; Lucumí (yellow card) 89'	Report	Vitinha 17'; Venturino 26', 43'; Otoa (yellow card) 49'; Onana (yellow card) 80'	Stadium: Stadio Renato Dall'Ara; Attendance: 29,975; Referee: Marco Monaldi

=== Coppa Italia ===
3 December 2024 Round of 16	Bologna	4–0	Monza	Bologna
18:30 CET (UTC+1)	Pobega 32'; Orsolini 35'; Domínguez 63'; Castro 76'	Report	Izzo (yellow card) 65'	Stadium: Stadio Renato Dall'Ara; Attendance: 11,952; Referee: Maria Sole Ferrieri Caputi

4 February 2025 Quarter-finals	Atalanta	0–1	Bologna	Bergamo
21:00 CET (UTC+1)	De Roon (yellow card) 90+2'	Report	Holm (yellow card) 67'; Castro 80'; Ndoye (yellow card) 90+2'	Stadium: Gewiss Stadium; Attendance: 20,492; Referee: Livio Marinelli

1 April 2025 Semi-finals; First leg	Empoli	0–3	Bologna	Empoli
21:00 CEST (UTC+2)		Report	Orsolini 23'; Dallinga 29', 51'	Stadium: Stadio Carlo Castellani; Attendance: 11,721; Referee: Luca Zufferli

24 April 2025 Semi-finals; Second leg	Bologna	2–1 (5–1 agg.)	Empoli	Bologna
21:00 CEST (UTC+2)	Fabbian 7'; Orsolini (yellow card) 45+1'; Dallinga 86'	Report	De Sciglio (yellow card) 19'; Marianucci (yellow card) 20'; Kovalenko 33'; Sambia (yellow card) 59'	Stadium: Stadio Renato Dall'Ara; Attendance: 27,033; Referee: Matteo Marcenaro

14 May 2025 Final	Milan	0–1	Bologna	Rome
21:00 CEST (UTC+2)	Tomori (yellow card) 38'; Pulisic (yellow card) 45+2'	Report	Ferguson (yellow card) 43'; Ndoye 53'; Fabbian (yellow card) 57'; Lucumí (yellow card) 74'	Stadium: Stadio Olimpico; Attendance: 68,490; Referee: Maurizio Mariani

=== UEFA Champions League ===
==== League phase ====
The draw for the league phase was held on 29 August 2024.

Pos	Team	Pld	W	D	L	GF	GA	GD	Pts
26	(German Football Association) VfB Stuttgart	8	3	1	4	13	17	−4	10
27	(Ukrainian Association of Football) Shakhtar Donetsk	8	2	1	5	8	16	−8	7
28	(Italian Football Federation) Bologna	8	1	3	4	4	9	−5	6
29	(Football Association of Serbia) Red Star Belgrade	8	2	0	6	13	22	−9	6
30	(Austrian Football Association) Sturm Graz	8	2	0	6	5	14	−9	6

Source: UEFA
Rules for classification: League phase tiebreakers

Round	1	2	3	4	5	6	7	8
Ground	H	A	A	H	H	A	H	A
Result	D	L	L	L	L	D	W	D
Position	16	26	29	31	33	33	28	28
Points	1	1	1	1	1	2	5	6

Source: UEFA
A = Away; H = Home; W = Win; D = Draw; L = Loss

18 September 2024 1	Bologna (Italy)	0–0	(Ukraine) Shakhtar Donetsk	Bologna
18:45 CEST (UTC+2)	Posch (yellow card) 3'; Castro (yellow card) 58'	Report	Sudakov (penalty missed) 4'; Bondar (yellow card) 12'; Vinicius Tobias (yellow card) 70'; Stepanenko (yellow card) 84'; Marlon Gomes (yellow card) 88'	Stadium: Stadio Renato Dall'Ara; Attendance: 23,130; Referee: Rohit Saggi (Norway)

2 October 2024 2	Liverpool (England)	2–0	(Italy) Bologna	Liverpool, England
20:00 BST (UTC+1)	Mac Allister 11'; Van Dijk (yellow card) 26'; Konaté (yellow card) 39'; Robertson (yellow card) 55'; Salah 75'; Tsimikas (yellow card) 90'	Report	Beukema (yellow card) 39'; Aebischer (yellow card) 67'	Stadium: Anfield; Attendance: 59,816; Referee: Nikola Dabanović (Montenegro)

22 October 2024 3	Aston Villa (England)	2–0	(Italy) Bologna	Birmingham, England
20:00 BST (UTC+1)	Barkley (yellow card) 50'; McGinn 55'; Durán 64'	Report	Orsolini (yellow card) 19'; Posch (yellow card) 45'; Lykogiannis (yellow card) 47'; Freuler (yellow card) 53'	Stadium: Villa Park; Attendance: 41,847; Referee: João Pinheiro (Portugal)

5 November 2024 4	Bologna (Italy)	0–1	(France) Monaco	Bologna
21:00 CET (UTC+1)	Moro (yellow card) 27'; Fabbian (yellow card) 53'; Lucumí (yellow card) 88'	Report	Camara (yellow card) 75'; Mawissa (yellow card) 77'; Kehrer 86'	Stadium: Stadio Renato Dall'Ara; Attendance: 23,084; Referee: Aliyar Aghayev (Azerbaijan)

27 November 2024 5	Bologna (Italy)	1–2	(France) Lille	Bologna
21:00 CET (UTC+1)	Lykogiannis (yellow card) 33'; Lucumí 63'; Odgaard (yellow card) 84'; Castro (yellow card) 90+6'	Report	Alexsandro (yellow card) 22'; Mukau 44', 66'; Meunier (yellow card) 54'; Mandi (yellow card) 80'; Zhegrova (yellow card) 90+5'	Stadium: Stadio Renato Dall'Ara; Attendance: 22,420; Referee: Michael Oliver (England)

11 December 2024 6	Benfica (Portugal)	0–0	(Italy) Bologna	Lisbon, Portugal
20:00 WET (UTC+0)	Pavlidis (yellow card) 24'; Florentino (yellow card) 48'; Bah (yellow card) 59'; Kökçü (yellow card) 63'; Otamendi (yellow card) 76'	Report	Fabbian (yellow card) 53'; Casale (yellow card) 62'; Ferguson (yellow card) 71'; Freuler (yellow card) 89'; Beukema (yellow card) 90+5'	Stadium: Estádio da Luz; Attendance: 60,650; Referee: Radu Petrescu (Romania)

21 January 2025 7	Bologna (Italy)	2–1	(Germany) Borussia Dortmund	Bologna
21:00 CET (UTC+1)	Holm (yellow card) 14'; Freuler (yellow card) 20'; Lucumí (yellow card) 60'; Dallinga 71'; Iling-Junior 72'; Ferguson (yellow card) 90'	Report	Guirassy 15' (pen.); Beier (yellow card) 62'; Adeyemi (yellow card) 81'; Couto (yellow card) 82'; Ryerson (yellow card) 89'	Stadium: Stadio Renato Dall'Ara; Attendance: 26,801; Referee: Serdar Gözübüyük (Netherlands)

29 January 2025 8	Sporting CP (Portugal)	1–1	(Italy) Bologna	Lisbon, Portugal
20:00 WET (UTC+0)	Debast (yellow card) 43'; Simões (yellow card) 66'; Harder 77'; Hjulmand (yellow card) 87'; Quenda (yellow card) 90+3'	Report	Pobega 21'; Holm (yellow card) 22'; Beukema (yellow card) 41'; Iling-Junior (yellow card) 44'; Lykogiannis (yellow card) 56'; Erlić (yellow card) 72'	Stadium: Estádio José Alvalade; Attendance: 37,328; Referee: Benoît Bastien (France)
