= Giovanni Fabbian =

Italian footballer (born 2003)

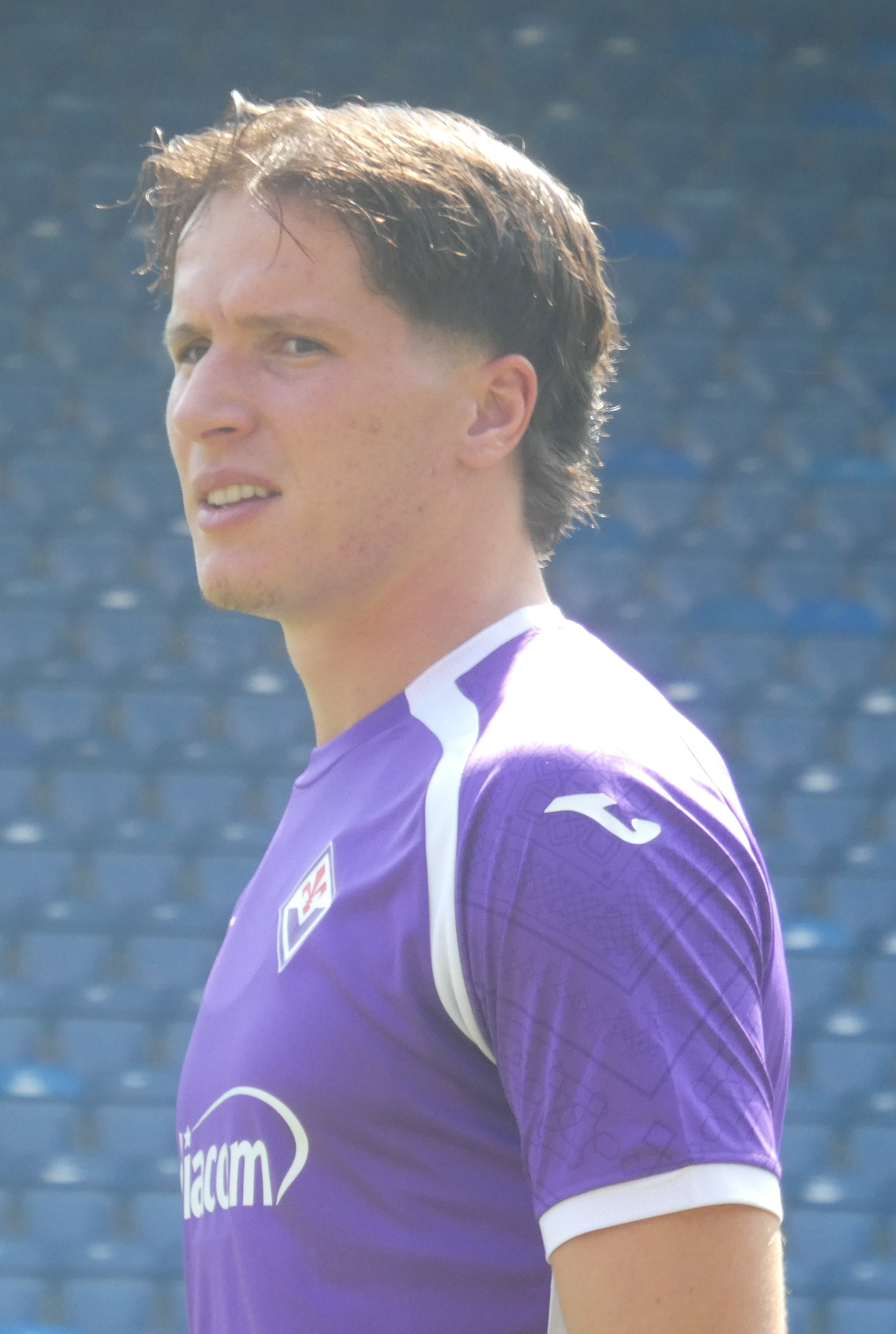
- Fabbian warming up for Fiorentina in 2026

Personal information
- Date of birth: 14 January 2003 (age 23)
- Place of birth: Camposampiero, Italy
- Height: 1.90 m (6 ft 3 in)
- Position: Attacking midfielder

Team information
- Current team: Parma (on loan from Fiorentina)
- Number: 80

Youth career
- 2010–2018: Padova
- 2018–2022: Inter Milan

Senior career*
Years	Team	Apps	(Gls)
2022–2023	Inter Milan	4	(0)
2022–2023	→ Reggina (loan)	38	(8)
2023–2026	Bologna	71	(10)
2026	→ Fiorentina (loan)	15	(0)
2026–	Fiorentina	0	(0)
2026–	→ Parma (loan)	8	(1)

International career^{‡}
2018–2019	Italy U16	6	(0)
2019	Italy U17	2	(0)
2021–2022	Italy U19	14	(2)
2022	Italy U20	4	(2)
2023–2025	Italy U21	18	(4)
- * Club domestic league appearances and goals as of 22:24, 2 November 2026 (UTC) ‡ National team caps and goals as of 22 June 2025

Giovanni Fabbian (born 14 January 2003) is an Italian professional footballer who plays as an attacking midfielder for Serie A club Parma, on loan from Fiorentina.

== Club career ==
=== Reggina ===
A product of Inter Milan's youth academy, on 30 July 2022, Fabbian joined Reggina in Serie B on loan. He made his Serie B debut for Reggina on 14 August 2022 in a game against SPAL. He scored his first goal in his third game on 28 August 2022 against Südtirol.

=== Bologna ===
On 20 August 2023, Fabbian joined Serie A club Bologna on a permanent transfer with a buy-back option in favour of Inter.

==== Loan to Fiorentina ====
On 21 January 2026, Fabbian moved on loan to Fiorentina, with an obligation to buy.

=== Fiorentina ===
On 1 July 2026, Fabbian joined Fiorentina on a four-year deal

==== Loan to Parma ====
On 28 August 2026, Fabbian joined Parma on loan with an option to buy for €14 million.

== International career ==
Fabbian was first called up to represent his country in November 2018 for the Under-16 squad friendlies. He represented Italy at the 2022 UEFA European Under-19 Championship, where Italy reached the semi-final.

On 27 March 2023, he made his debut for the Italy U21 squad in a friendly match won 3–1 against Ukraine.

== Career statistics ==
=== Club ===
As of match played 2 November 2026

Appearances and goals by club, season and competition
Club	Season	League			Coppa Italia		Europe		Other		Total	
Club	Season	Division	Apps	Goals	Apps	Goals	Apps	Goals	Apps	Goals	Apps	Goals
Inter Milan	2022–23	Serie A	0	0	0	0	0	0	0	0	0	0
Reggina (loan)	2022–23	Serie B	37	8	1	0	—		—		38	8
Bologna	2023–24	Serie A	27	5	2	0	—		—		29	5
Bologna	2024–25	Serie A	30	3	4	1	7 (Note: Appearances in UEFA Champions League)	0	—		41	4
Bologna	2025–26	Serie A	14	2	1	0	5 (Note: Appearances in UEFA Europa League)	0	1	0	21	2
Bologna	Total		71	10	7	1	12	0	1	0	91	11
Fiorentina (loan)	2025–26	Serie A	15	0	1	0	6 (Note: Appearances in UEFA Conference League)	0	—		22	0
Fiorentina	2026–27	Serie A	0	0	0	0	—		—		0	0
Parma	2026–27	Serie A	8	1	1	0	—		—		9	1
Career total			131	19	10	1	18	0	1	0	159	20

== Honours ==
Bologna

- Coppa Italia: 2024–25

Individual

- Serie B Footballer of the Year: 2022–23
