= Charalampos Lykogiannis =

Greek footballer (born 1993)

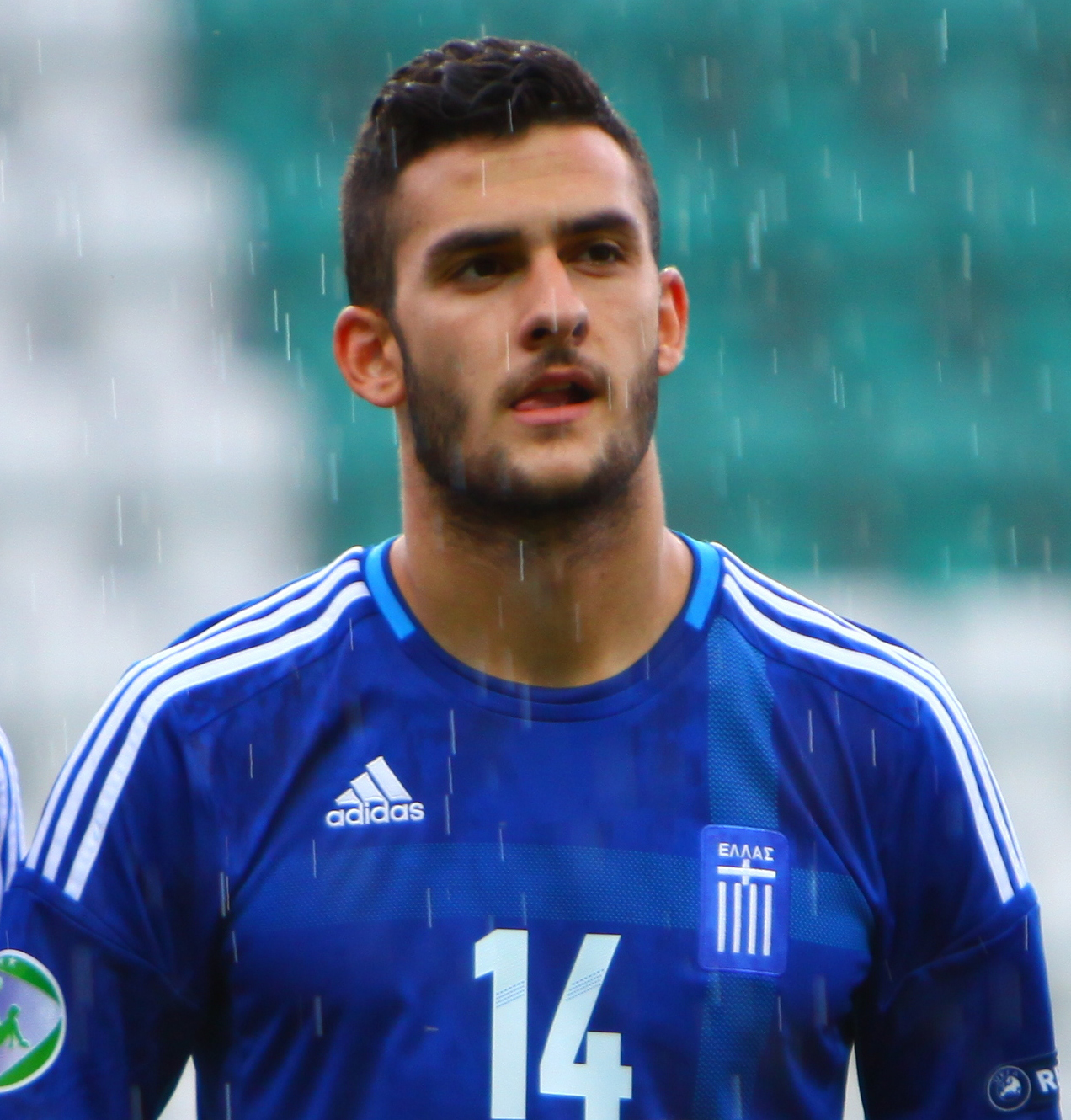
- Lykogiannis lining up for Greece U19 in 2012

Personal information
- Full name: Charalampos Lykogiannis
- Date of birth: 22 October 1993 (age 33)
- Place of birth: Piraeus, Greece
- Height: 1.91 m (6 ft 3 in)
- Position: Left-back

Team information
- Current team: AEK Athens
- Number: 22

Youth career
- 2007–2011: Olympiacos

Senior career*
Years	Team	Apps	(Gls)
2011–2015	Olympiacos	4	(0)
2013–2014	→ Levadiakos (loan)	22	(0)
2014–2015	→ Ergotelis (loan)	22	(1)
2015–2018	Sturm Graz	71	(6)
2018–2022	Cagliari	101	(5)
2022–2026	Bologna	70	(4)
2026–	AEK Athens	0	(0)

International career
2007–2009	Greece U17	9	(0)
2011–2012	Greece U19	14	(1)
2013–2014	Greece U20	4	(0)
2012–2015	Greece U21	9	(0)
2017–2020	Greece	6	(0)
- * Club domestic league appearances and goals as of 8 March 2026

Charalampos "Babis" Lykogiannis (Greek: Χαράλαμπος "Μπάμπης" Λυκογιάννης; born 22 October 1993), also known as Lykos (Greek for "wolf" – from the first letters of his surname), is a Greek professional footballer who plays as a left-back for Super League club AEK Athens.

== Club career ==
=== Olympiacos ===
Lykogiannis is a product of the youth system of Olympiacos and soon became an important part of Olympiacos' football academy. He is considered as a most gifted players of his generation.

On 25 January 2012, he made his debut with the first team in a Greek Football Cup match against Panionios as a substitute in the 82nd minute in front of 15,000 fans.

On 25 October 2012, Lykogiannis made his European debut in an away UEFA Champions League game against Montpellier HSC as a substitute in the 88th minute. He was brought on to play as a defensive midfielder for the remaining minutes of the match. Four days after his debut in UEFA Champions League, on 29 October 2012, Lykogiannis made his first appearance in an away game for Super League Greece against Aris as a substitute in the 68th minute.

He signed a professional contract with Olympiacos in June 2011, which in August 2012 he renewed until summer 2015.

In August 2013, he joined Levadiakos on loan. A year later, in August 2014 he joined Ergotelis on loan.

=== Sturm Graz ===
On 16 July 2015, Lykogiannis joined Sturm Graz for an undisclosed fee, having signed a contract for two years plus the option of a further year, while Olympiacos kept a 30% future resale rate. On 6 August 2015, he made his debut with the club as a substitute in an away 1–1 draw against Rubin Kazan for the 2nd leg of the 3rd qualifying UEFA Europa League round. On 27 October 2015, he made his debut in the Austrian Cup playing in a 3–2 win against ASK Ebreichsdorf.

On 22 November 2015, he scored his first goal with the club in a 3–1 away loss against Red Bull Salzburg for Austrian Bundesliga. On 27 November 2016, he opened the score with a free kick, in a 2–1 away win against rivals Rapid Wien. On 4 December 2016, he scored his second goal with another free kick in a 4–0 away win against Wolfsberger AC. On 12 March 2017, Lykogiannis scored with a long distance kick after an assist from Barış Atik giving a lead of two goals in his club in a final 2–1 home win against Rapid Wien. On 29 May 2017, Lykogiannis received a great distinction as he included in the team of the season for the 2016–17 season. Lykogiannis scored three goals and an equal number of assists in 36 games in all competitions.

On 6 August 2017, he scored his first goal for the 2017–18 season in a 3–2 away win against SV Mattersburg. On 25 November 2017, he scored the only goal with a wonderful kick after a corner from his teammate Peter Žulj, in the extra time of the game sealing a 1–0 home win against LASK Linz. In December 2017, it was reported that Lykogiannis’ performances had attracted interest from Greek clubs as well as foreign clubs like English Championship side Leeds United. Eventually, he left the club having 81 appearances (6 goals, 5 assists) in all competitions.

On 28 December 2019, Sturm Graz revealed their Team of the Decade, with Tasos Avlonitis and Lykogiannis both included in the starting 11.

=== Cagliari ===
On 17 January 2018, Serie A Club Cagliari managed to sign the Greek international, on a 4 1/2-year contract, for a transfer fee of €600,000. His contract, which ran until 2022, was worth €1.4 million per year. On 25 October 2020, he scored with a free kick in a 4–2 home win game against F.C. Crotone. It was his first goal with the club in all competitions. During the 2020–21 season, Cagliari was in danger of being relegated this year. On 25 April 2021, Lykogiannis opened the score in a thrilling 3–2 win against A.S. Roma and two weeks later scored a fantastic goal in the 1st minute of the match in a crucial game against Benevento, where Cagliari prevailed 3–1. It was his best season so far, and his effectiveness can be seen from the statistics as he had 4 goals and 2 assists during 2020–21 season. The most important thing, however, is that the four times he sent the ball into the net, he scored his team's first goal in three wins and one draw.

=== Bologna ===
On 1 July 2022, Lykogiannis moved to Bologna.

On 20 August 2026, Lykogiannis was announced at AEK Athens.

== International career ==
=== Greece under-17 ===
He was called for duty for Greece under-17 to participate in the 2007 UEFA European Under-17 Football Championship qualifying round against Norway.

=== Greece under-19 ===
Lykogiannis make his debut with Greece under-19 in an international friendly game against Sweden under-19.

=== 2012 UEFA European Under-19 Football Championship ===
Lykogiannis scored his first and winning goal in the 108th minute (1–2 after extra time) for Greece U19 in the semifinals against England U19 for the 2012 UEFA European Under-19 Football Championship finals that took place in Estonia. He came on as a substitute at the 67th minute for Greece U19 in the final against Spain U19, but the Spanish U19 side won the tournament with 1–0.

=== Greece under-21 ===
On 15 August 2012, he made his debut with Greece U21 for an international friendly game at Dimotiko stadio Kozanis against Poland U21.

=== Greece ===
On 24 May 2017, Lykogiannis received his debut call from Michael Skibbe to play for Greece in the match against Bosnia at the preliminary round of the 2018 World Cup. On 3 September 2017, he made his debut as a substitute in a 1–2 home loss for 2018 FIFA World Cup qualification against Belgium.

== Career statistics ==
=== Club ===
As of match played 12 March 2026

Appearances and goals by club, season and competition
Club	Season	League			National cup		Europe		Total	
Club	Season	Division	Apps	Goals	Apps	Goals	Apps	Goals	Apps	Goals
Olympiacos	2012–13	Super League Greece	4	0	2	0	3 (Note: Two appearances in UEFA Champions League, one appearance in UEFA Europa League)	0	9	0
Levadiakos (loan)	2013–14	Super League Greece	21	0	1	0	—		22	0
Ergotelis (loan)	2014–15	Super League Greece	22	1	1	0	—		23	1
Sturm Graz	2015–16	Austrian Bundesliga	20	1	2	0	1 (Note: Appearances in UEFA Europa League)	0	23	1
Sturm Graz	2016–17	Austrian Bundesliga	34	3	2	0	—		36	3
Sturm Graz	2017–18	Austrian Bundesliga	17	2	1	0	4	0	22	2
Sturm Graz	Total		71	6	5	0	5	0	82	6
Cagliari	2017–18	Serie A	11	0	0	0	—		11	0
Cagliari	2018–19	Serie A	11	0	1	0	—		12	0
Cagliari	2019–20	Serie A	20	0	3	0	—		23	0
Cagliari	2020–21	Serie A	31	4	2	0	—		33	4
Cagliari	2021–22	Serie A	28	1	2	0	—		30	1
Cagliari	Total		101	5	8	0	0	0	109	5
Bologna	2022–23	Serie A	21	2	3	0	—		24	2
Bologna	2023–24	Serie A	22	2	3	0	—		25	2
Bologna	2024–25	Serie A	17	0	3	0	5 (Note: Appearances in UEFA Champions League)	0	25	0
Bologna	2025–26	Serie A	10	0	1	0	7	0	18	0
Bologna	Total		70	4	10	0	12	0	92	4
Career total			289	16	27	0	20	0	336	16

=== International ===
As of match played 11 November 2020

Appearances and goals by national team and year
National team	Year	Apps	Goals
Greece	2017	1	0
Greece	2018	3	0
Greece	2020	2	0
Total		6	0

== Honours ==
Olympiacos

- Super League Greece: 2012–13
- Greek Football Cup: 2011–12, 2012–13

SK Strum Graz

- Austrian Cup: 2017–18

Bologna

- Coppa Italia: 2024–25

Greece U19

- UEFA European Under-19 Championship runner-up:2012

Individual

- UEFA European Under-19 Championship Team of the Tournament: 2012
- Austrian Bundesliga Team of the Year: 2016–17
