= Federico Ravaglia =

Italian footballer (born 1999)

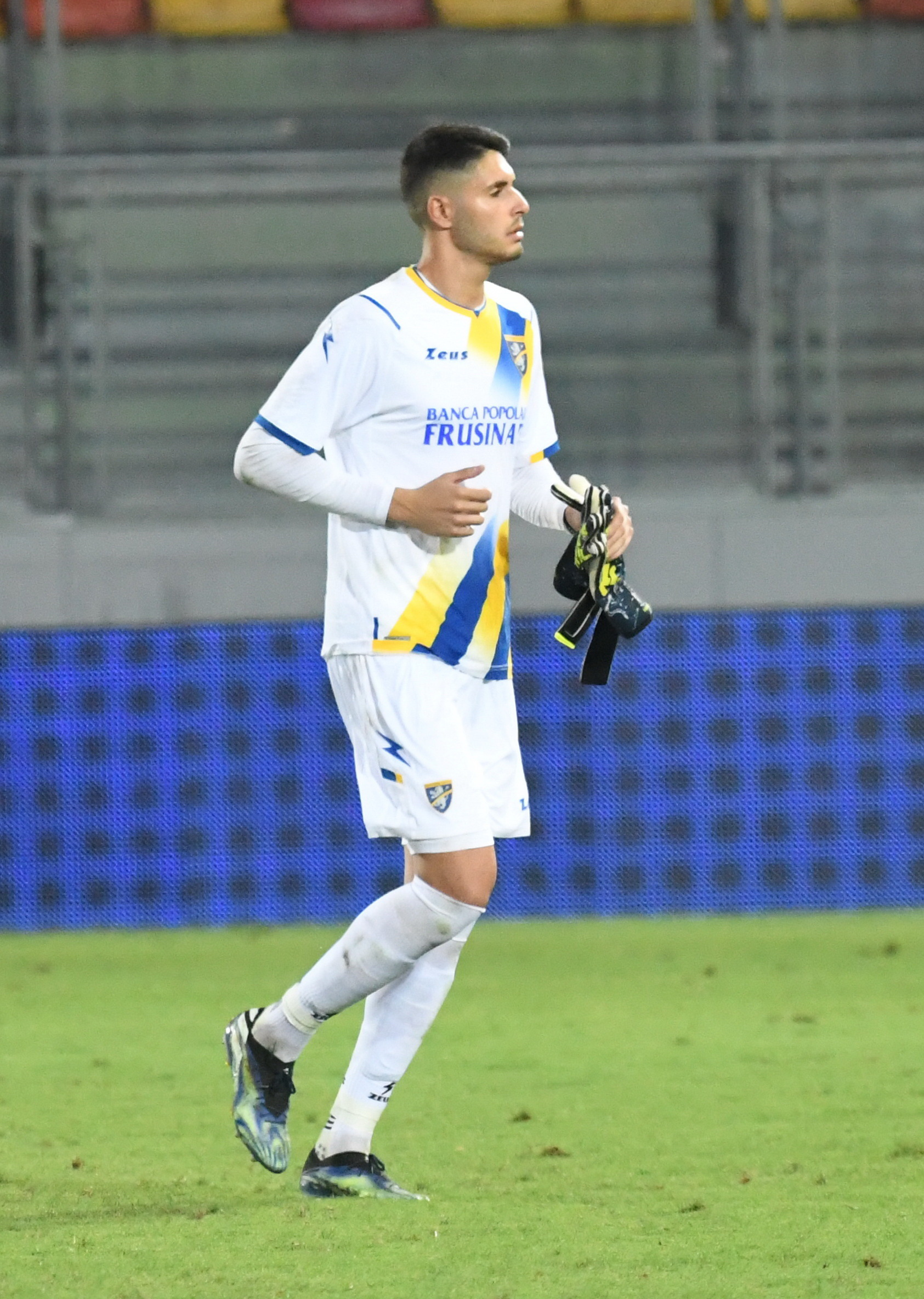
- Ravaglia playing for Frosinone in 2021

Personal information
- Date of birth: 11 November 1999 (age 26)
- Place of birth: Bologna, Italy
- Height: 1.97 m (6 ft 6 in)
- Position: Goalkeeper

Team information
- Current team: Watford
- Number: 1

Youth career
- –2018: Bologna

Senior career*
Years	Team	Apps	(Gls)
2018–2026	Bologna	39	(0)
2018–2019	→ Südtirol (loan)	1	(0)
2019–2020	→ Gubbio (loan)	24	(0)
2021–2022	→ Frosinone (loan)	27	(0)
2022–2023	→ Reggina (loan)	4	(0)
2026–	Watford	9	(0)
- * Club domestic league appearances and goals as of 11 October 2026

Federico Ravaglia (born 11 November 1999) is an Italian professional footballer who plays as a goalkeeper for EFL Championship club Watford.

== Career ==
=== Bologna ===
Ravaglia was raised in the Bologna youth teams and started playing for their Under-19 squad in the 2016–17 season.

During the 2016–17 and 2017–18 seasons, he appeared on the bench in Serie A matches 40 times, but did not see any playing time.

During the 2020–21 season he became the Bologna's second keeper (after Łukasz Skorupski) during the season, and he also did his debut for the club in Serie A on 13 December 2020 in a 5–1 home loss against Roma.

==== Loan to Südtirol ====
On 10 July 2018, he joined Serie C club Südtirol on a season-long loan.

He made his professional Serie C debut for Südtirol on 5 May 2019 in a game against Monza. He replaced Michele Nardi at half-time. That remained his only appearance for Südtirol as he stayed on the bench for the rest of the season.

==== Loan to Gubbio ====
On 23 July 2019, he was loaned to Serie C club Gubbio.

He made his first starting-lineup Serie C appearance for Gubbio on 25 August 2019 in a game against Triestina.

==== Loan to Frosinone ====
On 17 July 2021, he was loaned to Serie B side Frosinone.

==== Loan to Reggina ====
On 21 July 2022, Ravaglia joined Reggina on loan. The loan was terminated early in January 2023 after Nicola Bagnolini suffered a long-term injury and Bologna needed a third goalkeeper.

==== Return to Bologna ====
On 20 December 2023, Ravaglia started and saved a penalty kick by Lautaro Martínez in a 2–1 away victory over Inter Milan, in the round of 16 of the Coppa Italia.

=== Watford ===
On 31 July 2026, Ravaglia signed for EFL Championship club Watford for an undisclosed fee, signing a six-year contract.

== Career statistics ==
As of match played 25 April 2026

Appearances and goals by club, season and competition
Club	Season	League			National cup		League Cup		Europe		Other		Total	
Club	Season	Division	Apps	Goals	Apps	Goals	Apps	Goals	Apps	Goals	Apps	Goals	Apps	Goals
Bologna	2016–17	Serie A	0	0	0	0	—		—		—		0	0
Bologna	2017–18	Serie A	0	0	0	0	—		—		—		0	0
Bologna	2020–21	Serie A	4	0	0	0	—		—		—		4	0
Bologna	2022–23	Serie A	0	0	0	0	—		—		—		0	0
Bologna	2023–24	Serie A	6	0	2	0	—		—		—		8	0
Bologna	2024–25	Serie A	12	0	2	0	—		1 (Note: Appearance in UEFA Champions League)	0	—		15	0
Bologna	2025–26	Serie A	17	0	1	0	—		5 (Note: Appearances in UEFA Europa League)	0	1 (Note: Appearance in Supercoppa Italiana)	0	24	0
Bologna	Total		39	0	5	0	—		6	0	1	0	51	0
Südtirol (loan)	2018–19	Serie C	1	0	1	0	—		—		0	0	2	0
Gubbio (loan)	2019–20	Serie C	24	0	1	0	—		—		—		25	0
Frosinone (loan)	2021–22	Serie B	27	0	1	0	—		—		—		28	0
Reggina (loan)	2022–23	Serie D	4	0	1	0	—		—		—		5	0
Watford	2026–27	Championship	0	0	0	0	0	0	—		—		0	0
Career total			95	0	9	0	0	0	6	0	1	0	111	0

== Honours ==
Bologna

- Coppa Italia: 2024–25
