= Benjamín Domínguez =

Argentine footballer (born 2003)

Personal information
- Date of birth: 19 September 2003 (age 23)
- Place of birth: La Plata, Argentina
- Height: 1.72 m (5 ft 8 in)
- Position: Left winger

Team information
- Current team: Sassuolo (on loan from Bologna)
- Number: 25

Youth career
- Gimnasia y Esgrima La Plata

Senior career*
Years	Team	Apps	(Gls)
2021–2024	Gimnasia y Esgrima La Plata	81	(9)
2024–	Bologna	39	(3)
2026–	→ Sassuolo (loan)	0	(0)
- * Club domestic league appearances and goals as of 18:16, 17 May 2026 (UTC)

Benjamín "Benja" Domínguez (born 19 September 2003) is an Argentine professional footballer who plays as a left winger for Serie A club Sassuolo, on loan from Bologna.

== Career ==
Benjamín Domínguez came through the youth ranks of Gimnasia y Esgrima La Plata in his native La Plata, being promoted to the first team towards the end of the 2021 season. He made his professional debut with the senior team on the 23 November 2021, coming on as a late substitute for Luis Rodríguez during the 5–2 home Superliga win against Talleres de Córdoba, that took the league title out of their opponents hands, with River Plate being crowned Argentine champions in the next days.

On 28 August 2024, Domínguez joined Bologna in Italian Serie A. On 19 October 2024, he made a debut for Bologna during a match against Genoa.

On 11 August 2026, Domínguez joined fellow Serie A club Sassuolo, on loan for the 2026–27 season.

== Career statistics ==
As of match played 17 May 2026

Appearances and goals by club, season and competition
Club	Season	League			National cup (Note: Includes Copa Argentina, Coppa Italia)		Continental		Other		Total	
Club	Season	Division	Apps	Goals	Apps	Goals	Apps	Goals	Apps	Goals	Apps	Goals
Gimnasia LP	2021	Argentine Primera División	1	0	0	0	—		0	0	1	0
Gimnasia LP	2022	Argentine Primera División	26	1	2	0	0	0	—		28	1
Gimnasia LP	2023	Argentine Primera División	29	2	1	0	2 (Note: Appearances in Copa Sudamericana)	0	—		32	2
Gimnasia LP	2024	Argentine Primera División	25	6	3	1	—		—		28	7
Gimnasia LP	Total		81	9	6	1	2	0	0	0	89	10
Bologna	2024–25	Serie A	24	3	4	1	0	0	—		28	4
Bologna	2025–26	Serie A	15	0	2	0	3 (Note: Appearances in UEFA Europa League)	0	—		20	0
Bologna	Total		39	3	6	1	3	0	—		48	4
Career total			120	12	12	2	5	0	0	0	137	14

== Honours ==
Bologna

- Coppa Italia: 2024–25
