= Emil Holm (footballer) =

Swedish footballer (born 2000)

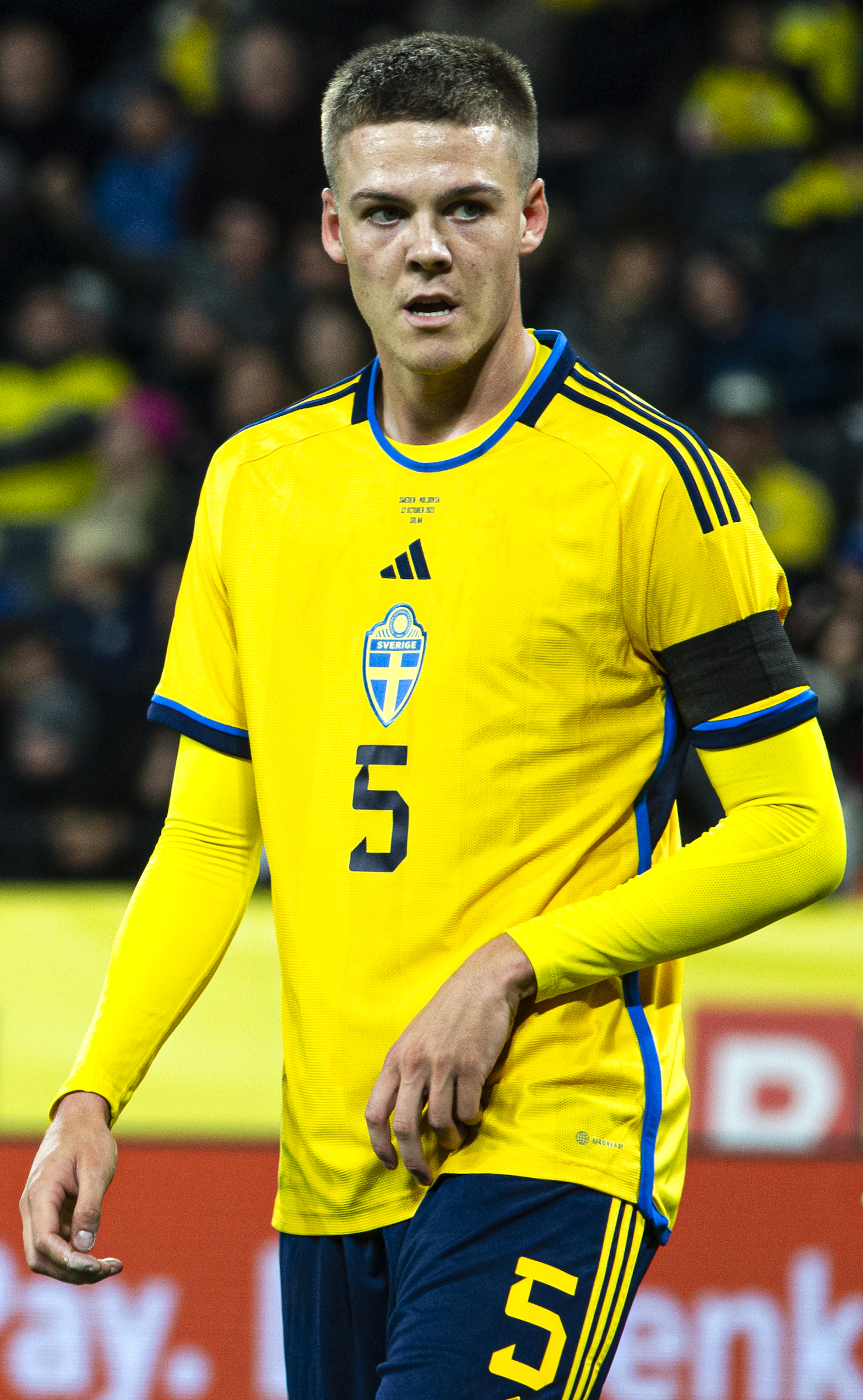
- Holm playing for Sweden in 2023

Personal information
- Full name: Emil Alfons Holm
- Date of birth: 13 May 2000 (age 26)
- Place of birth: Gothenburg, Sweden
- Height: 1.92 m (6 ft 4 in)
- Position: Right-back

Team information
- Current team: Bologna
- Number: 2

Youth career
- 2005–2012: Annebergs IF
- 2012–2018: IFK Göteborg

Senior career*
Years	Team	Apps	(Gls)
2019–2020	IFK Göteborg	37	(2)
2021	SønderjyskE	20	(3)
2021–2024	Spezia	20	(1)
2021–2022	→ SønderjyskE (loan)	19	(3)
2023–2024	→ Atalanta (loan)	22	(1)
2024–	Bologna	37	(2)
2026	→ Juventus (loan)	7	(0)

International career^{‡}
2018–2019	Sweden U19	7	(0)
2021–2022	Sweden U21	9	(2)
2022–	Sweden	17	(2)
- * Club domestic league appearances and goals as of 20:15, 19 September 2026 (UTC) ‡ National team caps and goals as of 22:33, 25 September 2026 (UTC)

Emil Alfons Holm (born 13 May 2000) is a Swedish professional footballer who plays as a right-back for Serie A club Bologna and the Sweden national team.

== Club career ==
On 27 January 2021, Holm joined Danish Superliga side SønderjyskE, signing a four-year contract with the club.

On 27 August of the same year, Holm joined Italian club Spezia, before being sent back to SønderjyskE on loan for the rest of the season.

On 31 August 2023, Holm joined Serie A club Atalanta on a season-long loan, with the deal reportedly including an initial €2 million fee, as well as an €8.5 million option-to-buy.

On 2 February 2026, Holm joined fellow Serie A club Juventus on loan until the end of the season with an option-to-buy of €15 million, which could increase to a maximum of €18 million.

== International career ==
Holm represented the Sweden U19 and U21 times a total of 16 times between 2018 and 2022. He made his full international debut for Sweden on 16 November 2022 in a friendly game against Mexico, playing the full 90 minutes in a 2–1 win.

On 12 May 2026, Holm was named in the Sweden squad for the 2026 FIFA World Cup. However, on 30 May, he was replaced by Herman Johansson due to an injury.

== Career statistics ==
=== Club ===
As of match played 19 September 2026

Appearances and goals by club, season and competition
Club	Season	League			National cup (Note: Includes Svenska Cupen, Danish Cup, Coppa Italia)		Europe		Other		Total	
Club	Season	Division	Apps	Goals	Apps	Goals	Apps	Goals	Apps	Goals	Apps	Goals
IFK Göteborg	2019	Allsvenskan	11	0	0	0	—		—		11	0
IFK Göteborg	2020	Allsvenskan	26	2	4	0	1 (Note: Appearance(s) in UEFA Europa League)	0	—		31	2
IFK Göteborg	Total		37	2	4	0	1	0	—		42	2
SønderjyskE	2020–21	Danish Superliga	14	3	4	2	—		—		18	5
SønderjyskE	2021–22	Danish Superliga	25	3	1	0	—		—		26	3
SønderjyskE	Total		39	6	5	2	—		—		44	8
Spezia	2022–23	Serie A	20	1	3	0	—		—		23	1
Atalanta (loan)	2023–24	Serie A	22	1	3	0	7	0	—		32	1
Bologna	2024–25	Serie A	21	1	4	0	4 (Note: Appearances in UEFA Champions League)	0	—		29	1
Bologna	2025–26	Serie A	11	1	1	0	5	0	2 (Note: Appearances in Supercoppa Italiana)	0	19	1
Bologna	2026–27	Serie A	5	0	0	0	—		—		5	0
Bologna	Total		37	2	5	0	9	0	2	0	53	2
Juventus (loan)	2025–26	Serie A	7	0	1	0	0	0	—		8	0
Career total			162	12	21	2	17	0	2	0	202	14

=== International ===
As of match played 25 September 2026

Appearances and goals by national team and year
National team	Year	Apps	Goals
Sweden	2022	2	0
Sweden	2023	3	1
Sweden	2024	5	0
Sweden	2025	7	1
Total		17	2

Scores and results list Sweden's goal tally first, score column indicates score after each Holm goal.

List of international goals scored by Emil Holm
No.	Date	Venue	Opponent	Score	Result	Competition	Ref.
1	12 September 2023	Friends Arena, Solna, Sweden	Austria	1–3	1–3	UEFA Euro 2024 qualifying	
2	25 March 2025	Strawberry Arena, Solna, Sweden	Northern Ireland	1–0	5–1	Friendly	

== Honours ==
IFK Göteborg

- Svenska Cupen: 2019–20

Atalanta

- UEFA Europa League: 2023–24

Bologna

- Coppa Italia: 2024–25
