= Tommaso Pobega =

Italian footballer (born 1999)

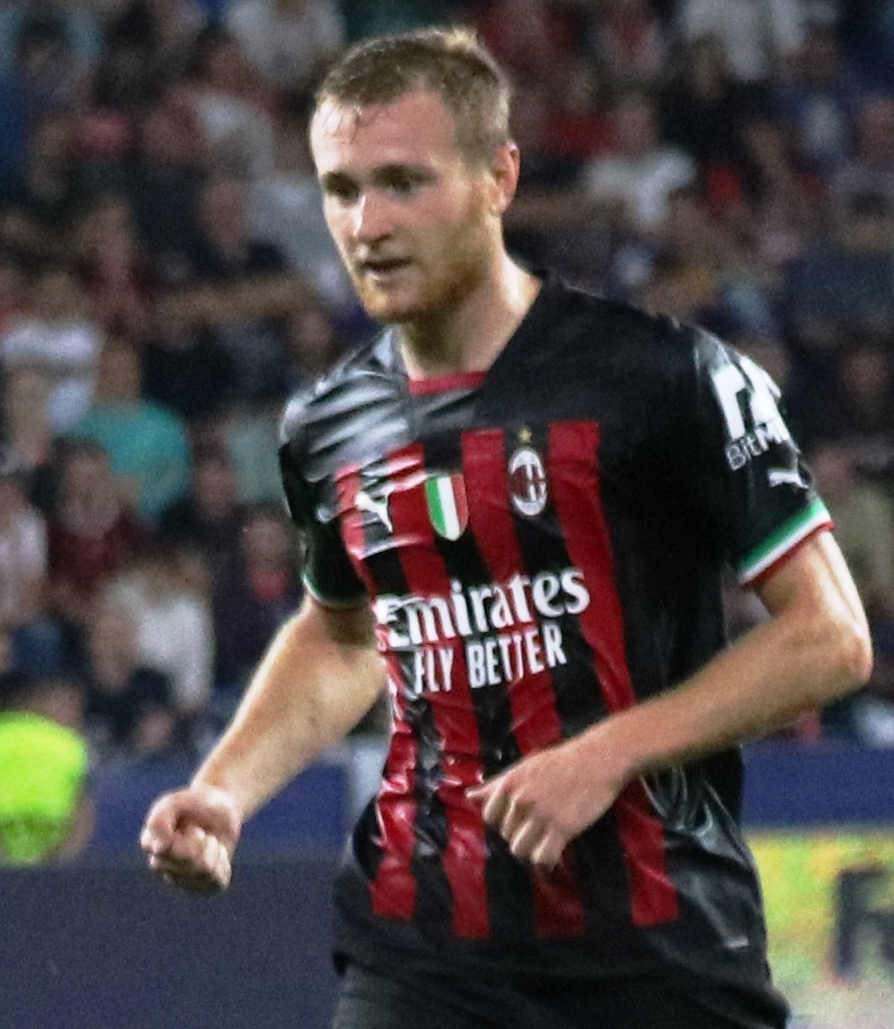
- Pobega playing for AC Milan in 2022

Personal information
- Date of birth: 15 July 1999 (age 27)
- Place of birth: Trieste, Italy
- Height: 1.89 m (6 ft 2 in)
- Position: Midfielder

Team information
- Current team: Bologna
- Number: 4

Youth career
- 2009–2013: Triestina
- 2013–2018: AC Milan

Senior career*
Years	Team	Apps	(Gls)
2018–2026	AC Milan	30	(2)
2018–2019	→ Ternana (loan)	32	(3)
2019–2020	→ Pordenone (loan)	33	(5)
2020–2021	→ Spezia (loan)	20	(6)
2021–2022	→ Torino (loan)	33	(4)
2024–2026	→ Bologna (loan)	47	(5)
2026–	Bologna	9	(2)

International career
2019	Italy U20	2	(0)
2020–2021	Italy U21	6	(3)
2022	Italy	3	(0)
- * Club domestic league appearances and goals as of 16:05, 31 October 2026 (UTC)

Tommaso Pobega (Italian pronunciation: [tomˈmaːzo poˈbeːɡa] born 15 July 1999) is an Italian professional footballer who plays as a midfielder for Serie A club Bologna.

== Club career ==
=== AC Milan ===
Pobega appeared in friendlies for the main squad of AC Milan in the autumn of 2016.

==== Loan to Ternana ====
On 23 August 2018, he joined to Serie C club Ternana on loan for the 2018–19 season. On 7 October, Pobega made his professional debut in Serie C for Ternana as a substitute replacing Giuseppe Vives in the 73rd minute of a 1–1 home draw against Renate. Two weeks later he was sent-off, as a substitute, with a double yellow card in the 87th minute of a 1–1 away draw against Triestina. On 7 November, Pobega played his first entire match for Ternana, a 1–0 away win over Fano. On 27 December, he scored his first professional goal in the 69th minute of a 2–1 home win over Teramo. On 9 February 2019, Pobega scored twice in a 2–2 home draw against Virtus Verona. He ended his season-long loan to Ternana with 32 appearances, 3 goals and 3 assists.

==== Loan to Pordenone ====
On 15 July 2019, Pobega joined Serie B club Pordenone a loan until 30 June 2020. On 11 August, he made his debut and he scored his first goal for the club in the 44th minute of a 2–1 home defeat against FeralpiSalò in the second round of Coppa Italia, he played the entire match. On 26 August, Pobega made his Serie B debut for Pordenone and he scored twice in a 3–0 home win over against Frosinone, he was replaced by Simone Pasa after 81 minutes. Five days later, he played his first entire match in Serie B, a 4–2 away defeat against Pescara. On 5 October, Pobega scored his third goal in Serie B in the 40th minute of a 2–0 home win over Empoli.

==== Loan to Spezia ====
On 24 August 2020, he signed a new contract with Milan until 30 June 2025. On 23 September 2020, Pobega joined promoted Serie A club Spezia on loan until 30 June 2021. On 27 September, he made his debut for Spezia in a 4–1 home defeat to Sassuolo. On 1 November 2020, Pobega scored his first goal for Spezia in a 4–1 home defeat to Juventus.

==== Return to AC Milan ====
He returned to AC Milan for the 2021–22 preseason, and made his first appearance for the club on 17 July 2021, in the friendly match won 6–0 against Pro Sesto.

==== Loan to Torino ====
On 27 August 2021, Pobega joined Torino on loan until 30 June 2022.

==== Contract extension with AC Milan ====
On 5 August 2022, Pobega extended his contract until 30 June 2027. He scored his first competitive goal on 14 September 2022 against Dinamo Zagreb in Champions League match coming in as a substitute.

In December 2023, Pobega suffered a rectus femoris injury, which was operated in Turku, Finland, by surgeon Lasse Lempainen in late December 2023.

==== Loans to Bologna ====
On 24 August 2024, he joined fellow Serie A club Bologna, on a season-long loan with an option to make the move permanent. Pobega reunited with head coach Vincenzo Italiano, with whom he worked together previously at Spezia.

On 22 July 2025, he returned to Bologna on a new loan, this time with a conditional obligation to buy.

=== Bologna ===
In February 2026, Bologna activated the buy-option and Pobega joined the club permanently, ahead of the 2026–27 season.

== International career ==
On 12 November 2020, Pobega made his debut with the Italy U21 team, starting in a qualifying match 2–1 away win over Iceland, scoring both of the goals for Italy.

He has been called up by the national team for the first time on 5 November 2021, for the matches against Switzerland and Northern Ireland for the 2022 FIFA World Cup qualifiers.

== Career statistics ==
=== Club ===
As of match played 31 October 2026

Appearances and goals by club, season and competition
Club	Season	League			National cup		Europe		Other		Total	
Club	Season	Division	Apps	Goals	Apps	Goals	Apps	Goals	Apps	Goals	Apps	Goals
Ternana (loan)	2018–19	Serie C	32	3	0	0	—		—		32	3
Pordenone (loan)	2019–20	Serie B	33	5	1	1	—		—		34	6
Spezia (loan)	2020–21	Serie A	20	6	0	0	—		—		20	6
Torino (loan)	2021–22	Serie A	33	4	0	0	—		—		33	4
Milan	2022–23	Serie A	19	2	1	0	8 (Note: Appearances in UEFA Champions League)	1	0	0	28	3
Milan	2023–24	Serie A	11	0	0	0	4	0	—		15	0
Milan	Total		30	2	1	0	12	1	0	0	43	3
Bologna (loan)	2024–25	Serie A	21	2	4	1	5	1	—		30	4
Bologna (loan)	2025–26	Serie A	26	3	1	0	9 (Note: Appearances in UEFA Europa League)	1	2 (Note: Appearances in Supercoppa Italiana)	0	38	4
Bologna (loan)	Total		47	5	5	1	14	2	2	0	68	8
Bologna	2026–27	Serie A	9	2	0	0	0	0	—		9	2
Career total			204	27	7	2	26	3	2	0	239	32

=== International ===
As of match played 26 September 2022

Appearances and goals by national team and year
National team	Year	Apps	Goals
Italy	2022	3	0
Total		3	0

== Honours ==
Bologna

- Coppa Italia: 2024–25
