= Santiago Castro (footballer, born 2004) =

Argentine footballer (born 2004)

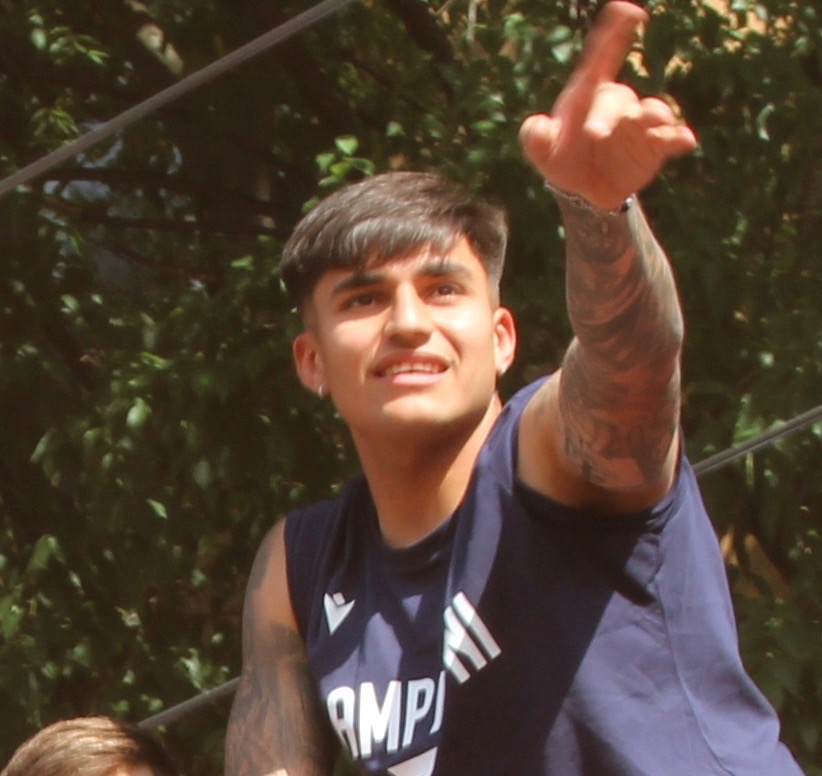
- Castro with Bologna in 2025

Personal information
- Full name: Santiago Tomás Castro
- Date of birth: 18 September 2004 (age 22)
- Place of birth: San Martín, Buenos Aires, Argentina
- Height: 1.82 m (6 ft 0 in)
- Position: Striker

Team information
- Current team: Roma
- Number: 9

Youth career
- 2011–2021: Vélez Sarsfield

Senior career*
Years	Team	Apps	(Gls)
2021–2024	Vélez Sarsfield	61	(8)
2024–2026	Bologna	79	(16)
2026–	Roma	9	(1)

International career^{‡}
2019	Argentina U15	6	(2)
2022–	Argentina U20	4	(2)
2026–	Argentina	1	(0)
- * Club domestic league appearances and goals as of 23:14, 7 November 2026 (UTC) ‡ National team caps and goals as of 3 October 2026

Santiago Tomás Castro (born 18 September 2004) is an Argentine professional footballer who plays as a striker for Serie A club Roma and the Argentina national team.

== Club career ==
=== Vélez Sarsfield ===
Castro started his career at Vélez Sarsfield, making his debut on 3 August 2021, against Atlético Tucumán. In March 2023, he extended his contract until 31 December 2025.

=== Bologna ===
On 30 January 2024, Castro signed with Bologna in Italy. Later that year, on 20 May, he recorded his first goal and assist in a 3–3 draw against Juventus.

=== Roma ===
On 30 July 2026, Castro signed a five-year contract with Roma, until 2031. Castro started his first game for Roma during a home match against Genoa on 17 October 2026. He scored the first goal in 50th minute with the match ending 2-0.

== International career ==
Castro made his debut for Argentina national team on 3 October 2026 in a friendly against Burkina Faso.

== Career statistics ==
=== Club ===
As of match played 7 November 2026

Appearances and goals by club, season and competition
Club	Season	League			National cup (Note: Includes Copa Argentina, Coppa Italia)		Continental		Other		Total	
Club	Season	Division	Apps	Goals	Apps	Goals	Apps	Goals	Apps	Goals	Apps	Goals
Vélez Sarsfield	2021	Argentine Primera División	2	0	—		0	0	—		2	0
Vélez Sarsfield	2022	Argentine Primera División	24	1	2	1	2 (Note: Appearances in Copa Libertadores)	0	—		28	2
Vélez Sarsfield	2023	Argentine Primera División	35	7	0	0	—		—		35	7
Vélez Sarsfield	Total		61	8	2	1	2	0	—		65	9
Bologna	2023–24	Serie A	8	1	—		—		—		8	1
Bologna	2024–25	Serie A	36	8	3	2	7 (Note: Appearances in UEFA Champions League)	0	—		46	10
Bologna	2025–26	Serie A	35	7	2	2	12 (Note: Appearances in UEFA Europa League)	2	2 (Note: Appearances in Supercoppa Italiana)	0	51	11
Bologna	Total		79	16	5	4	19	2	2	0	105	22
Roma	2026–27	Serie A	9	1	0	0	2	0	—		11	1
Career total			150	25	7	5	23	2	2	0	181	32

=== International ===
As of match played 3 October 2026

Appearances and goals by national team and year
National team	Year	Apps	Goals
Argentina	2026	1	0
Total		1	0

== Honours ==
Bologna

- Coppa Italia: 2024–25
