= Antonio Raimondo =

Italian footballer (born 2004)

Personal information
- Date of birth: 18 March 2004 (age 22)
- Place of birth: Ravenna, Italy
- Height: 1.85 m (6 ft 1 in)
- Position: Forward

Team information
- Current team: Frosinone (on loan from Bologna)
- Number: 9

Youth career
- 2013–2018: Cesena
- 2018–2021: Bologna

Senior career*
Years	Team	Apps	(Gls)
2021–	Bologna	4	(0)
2023–2024	→ Ternana (loan)	38	(9)
2024–2025	→ Venezia (loan)	9	(0)
2025	→ Salernitana (loan)	12	(1)
2025–	→ Frosinone (loan)	45	(19)

International career^{‡}
2021–2022	Italy U18	10	(7)
2022–2023	Italy U19	9	(2)
2023–2024	Italy U20	2	(0)
2024–	Italy U21	10	(4)
Medal record
Representing Italy
Mediterranean Games
Runner-up	Oran 2022	U-18 Team
- * Club domestic league appearances and goals as of 20:18, 29 October 2026 (UTC) ‡ National team caps and goals as of 20:48, 21 October 2026 (UTC)

Antonio Raimondo (born 18 March 2004) is an Italian professional footballer who plays as a centre-forward for Serie A club Frosinone, on loan from Bologna.

== Club career ==
Born in Ravenna but originally from Campania on his father’s side, Raimondo played football in the academy of Cesena, before joining Bologna in 2018. The striker signed his first professional contract with the Felsinei in December 2020. Having come through the club's youth ranks, he made his professional debut with the first team on 17 May 2021, coming on as a substitute for Rodrigo Palacio in the injury time of a 2–2 Serie A draw with Hellas Verona.

Raimondo made his first senior start on 21 May 2022, playing 75 minutes of the last league game of the season against Genoa, which ended in a 1–0 win for Bologna. At the end of the campaign, the club's manager Siniša Mihajlović announced that the forward would be officially promoted to the first team starting from the 2022–23 season, together with Wisdom Amey, Riccardo Stivanello and Kacper Urbański.

On 10 August 2023, Raimondo joined Serie B club Ternana on loan until the end of the season. On 27 August, he scored his first professional goal in a 2–1 league loss to Catanzaro.

On 8 August 2024, Raimondo joined newly-promoted Venezia on loan. On 9 January 2025, he moved on a new loan to Salernitana in Serie B for the remainder of the season.

On 17 July 2025, Raimondo moved on a new loan to Frosinone.

== International career ==
Raimondo is a youth international for Italy, having represented the under-18 and under-19 national teams.

He was included in the under-18 squad that took part in the 2022 Mediterranean Games in Oran, Algeria. Having scored six goals in five matches, the striker was one of the most notable performers in the Azzurrini's campaign, as Italy eventually won the silver medal following a 1–0 loss to France in the final match.

== Career statistics ==
As of match played 29 October 2026

Appearances and goals by club, season and competition
Club	Season	League			Coppa Italia		Other		Total	
Club	Season	Division	Apps	Goals	Apps	Goals	Apps	Goals	Apps	Goals
Bologna	2020–21	Serie A	1	0	—		—		1	0
Bologna	2021–22	Serie A	1	0	—		—		1	0
Bologna	2022–23	Serie A	2	0	—		—		2	0
Bologna	Total		4	0	0	0	0	0	4	0
Ternana (loan)	2023–24	Serie B	38	9	—		2	0	40	9
Venezia (loan)	2024–25	Serie A	9	0	1	0	—		10	0
Salernitana (loan)	2024–25	Serie B	12	1	—		2	0	14	1
Frosinone (loan)	2025–26	Serie B	36	11	1	0	—		37	11
Frosinone (loan)	2026–27	Serie A	9	8	1	1	—		10	9
Frosinone (loan)	Total		45	19	2	1	0	0	47	20
Career total			108	29	3	1	4	0	115	30

== Honours ==
Individual

- Serie A Rising Star of the Month: August–September 2026
