= Tommaso Corazza =

Italian footballer (born 2004)

Personal information
- Date of birth: 29 June 2004 (age 22)
- Place of birth: Bologna, Italy
- Height: 1.74 m (5 ft 9 in)
- Position: Left-back

Team information
- Current team: Vicenza (on loan from Bologna)
- Number: 21

Youth career
- 2009–2023: Bologna

Senior career*
Years	Team	Apps	(Gls)
2023–	Bologna	9	(0)
2025	→ Salernitana (loan)	13	(1)
2025–2026	→ Pescara (loan)	15	(3)
2026	→ Cesena (loan)	12	(2)
2026–	→ Vicenza (loan)	0	(0)

International career^{‡}
2023	Italy U20	1	(0)
- * Club domestic league appearances and goals as of 13 May 2026 ‡ National team caps and goals as of 11 September 2023

Tommaso Corazza (born 29 June 2004) is an Italian professional footballer who plays as a left-back for Serie B club Vicenza, on loan from Bologna.

== Career ==
Corazza joined the academy of Bologna in 2009; having worked his way up the club's youth categories, he started training with the first team in the summer of 2023.

On 11 August 2023, Corazza made his professional debut for Bologna in a 2–0 Coppa Italia win over Cesena: in the process, he also scored his first professional goal, netting the opener in the 2nd minute of the match.

On 9 January 2025, Corazza was loaned to Serie B club Salernitana for the remainder of the season.

On 1 September 2025, Corazza returned to Serie B, joining Pescara on loan. On 2 February 2026, Corazza moved on a new loan to Cesena. On 15 June 2026, he was sent by Bologna to his fourth consecutive Serie B loan, this time to Vicenza.

== Personal life ==
Corazza's father, Daniele, was a long-time youth manager at Bologna.

== Style of play ==
Corazza is a two-footed full-back who can play on either side. In his youth career, he was initially deployed as a midfielder or an offensive winger, before being moved to the right-back role while playing for Bologna's under-17 team; he then became an inverted left-back, while also covering as a wing-back. He has been mainly regarded for his professional attitude, his defensive skills and his athleticism.

== Career statistics ==
As of match played 10 December 2024

Appearances and goals by club, season and competition
Club	Season	League			Coppa Italia		Europe		Total	
Club	Season	Division	Apps	Goals	Apps	Goals	Apps	Goals	Apps	Goals
Bologna	2023–24	Serie A	9	0	3	1	—		12	1
Bologna	2024–25	Serie A	0	0	1	0	1 (Note: Appearance in UEFA Champions League)	0	2	0
Career total			9	0	4	1	1	0	14	1
