= Sebastian Otoa =

Danish footballer (born 2004)

Personal information
- Full name: Sebastian Villaume Otoa
- Date of birth: 13 May 2004 (age 22)
- Place of birth: Roskilde, Denmark
- Height: 1.98 m (6 ft 6 in)
- Position: Centre-back

Team information
- Current team: Genoa
- Number: 34

Youth career
- 2016–2019: Copenhagen
- 2019–2021: Roskilde
- 2021–2023: AaB

Senior career*
Years	Team	Apps	(Gls)
2022–2025	AaB	38	(2)
2025–	Genoa	19	(0)

International career^{‡}
2023	Denmark U19	1	(0)
2023	Denmark U20	4	(0)
2024–	Denmark U21	4	(0)
- * Club domestic league appearances and goals as of 10 October 2026 ‡ National team caps and goals as of 19:27, 15 February 2026 (UTC)

Sebastian Villaume Otoa (born 13 May 2004) is a Danish professional footballer who plays as a centre-back for Serie A club Genoa.

== Club career ==
=== AaB ===
Otoa joined AaB in the summer 2021, after turning down a contract offer at FC Roskilde, where he played U19 before joining AaB. Before that, he had spent three years in F.C. Copenhagen's academy. But his adventure in AaB got off to a rough start, as the tall defender only managed to play one game for AaB's U19 team before a series of leg strain injuries set in. In the spring of 2022, he returned to action for the U19 team, and also played a few reserve team matches.

After several sales in the AaB-squad, Otoa was called up for his first Danish Superliga match on 11 September 2022 against Lyngby Boldklub. 29 minutes into the match, Lars Kramer was injured and Otoa came on for his professional debut. On 12 July 2023, Otoa signed a new long-term deal with AaB until June 2027.

=== Genoa ===
On 16 January 2025, Otoa signed with Serie A club Genoa.

In April, on his Serie A debut for Genoa, Otoa received a straight red card after just 21 minutes.

== International career ==
Otoa was born in Denmark to a Cameroonian father and Danish mother. He was called up to the Denmark U21s for the 2025 UEFA European Under-21 Championship.
