= Naïm Byar =

Moroccan footballer (born 2005)

Personal information
- Date of birth: 23 February 2005 (age 21)
- Place of birth: Reims, France
- Height: 1.82 m (6 ft 0 in)
- Position: Midfielder

Team information
- Current team: Wydad AC

Youth career
- –2014: SC Tinqueux
- 2014–2024: Stade de Reims
- 2023–2024: → Bologna (loan)
- 2024–2025: Bologna

Senior career*
Years	Team	Apps	(Gls)
2021–2023	Reims B	25	(5)
2024–2026	Bologna	0	(0)
2025–2026	→ Foggia (loan)	8	(0)
2026–	Wydad AC	0	(0)

International career^{‡}
2021–2022	France U17	14	(2)
2023	France U18	6	(0)
2023–	Morocco U20	16	(1)
Medal record
Men's football
Representing Morocco
FIFA U-20 World Cup
Winner	2025 Chile
- * Club domestic league appearances and goals as of 4 January 2026 ‡ National team caps and goals as of 20 October 2025

Naïm Byar (Arabic: نعيم بيار; born 23 February 2005) is a professional footballer who plays as a midfielder for Wydad AC. Born in France, he represents Morocco internationally at youth level.

== Early life ==
Byar was born on 23 February 2005. Born in Reims, France, he is the son of Najim.

== Club career ==
As a youth payer, Byar joined the youth academy of French side SC Tinqueux. Following his stint there, he joined the youth academy of French side Stade de Reims in 2014.

Ahead of the 2023–24 season, he joined the youth academy of Italian Serie A side Bologna FC 1909 and was promoted to the club's senior team in 2024.

On 7 January 2026, Byar signed with Wydad AC in Morocco.

== International career ==
Byar is a Morocco and France youth international. During the autumn of 2025, he played for the Morocco national under-20 football team at the 2025 FIFA U-20 World Cup.

== Style of play ==
Byar plays as a midfielder and is right-footed. Italian news website MondoPrimavera wrote in 2024 that he is "a central midfielder who can also play as an attacking winger, he has made himself available both as a deep-lying midfielder in the build-up phase and as an attacking midfielder, operating behind the two forwards".

== Honours ==
Morocco U20

- FIFA U-20 World Cup: 2025
