= Riccardo Stivanello =

Italian footballer (born 2004)

Personal information
- Date of birth: 24 April 2004 (age 22)
- Place of birth: Dolo, Italy
- Height: 1.88 m (6 ft 2 in)
- Position: Centre-back

Team information
- Current team: Südtirol (on loan from Bologna)
- Number: 4

Youth career
- 2016–2018: Cittadella
- 2018–2021: Bologna

Senior career*
Years	Team	Apps	(Gls)
2022–	Bologna	1	(0)
2023–2025	→ Juventus Next Gen (loan)	30	(1)
2025–2026	→ Torres (loan)	0	(0)
2026	→ Lumezzane (loan)	18	(0)
2026–	→ Südtirol (loan)	1	(0)

International career^{‡}
2021–2022	Italy U18	4	(0)
2022–2023	Italy U19	8	(0)
- * Club domestic league appearances and goals as of 22 August 2026 ‡ National team caps and goals as of 22 March 2023

Riccardo Stivanello (born 24 April 2004) is an Italian professional footballer who plays as a centre-back for Serie B club Südtirol, on loan from Bologna.

== Club career ==
Stivanello started playing football at Cittadella, before joining Bologna in 2018. On 11 May 2021, he signed his first professional contract with the club. Having worked his way up their youth ranks, he made his professional debut on 21 May 2022, coming on as a substitute in the second half of a 1–0 Serie A win over Genoa.

On 16 June 2022, Stivanello extended his contract with Bologna until 30 June 2025.

On 29 August 2023, Stivanello joined Serie C side Juventus Next Gen, the reserve team of Juventus, on a season-long loan. He returned to Juventus Next Gen on a new loan for the 2024–25 season.

On 23 July 2025, Stivanello was loaned by Torres in Serie C.

== International career ==
Stivanello has represented Italy at several youth international levels, having played for the under-18 and under-19 national teams.

In June 2022, he was included in the Italian squad that took part in the UEFA Under-19 European Championship in Slovakia, where the Azzurrini reached the semi-finals before losing to eventual winners England.
