= 2021–22 Bologna FC 1909 season =

Bologna
2021–22 season
- Chairman: Joey Saputo
- Head coach: Siniša Mihajlović
- Stadium: Stadio Renato Dall'Ara
- Serie A: 13th
- Coppa Italia: First round
- Top goalscorer: League: Marko Arnautović (14); All: Marko Arnautović (15)
Home colours	Away colours	Third colours

The 2021–22 season was the 112th season in the existence of Bologna F.C. 1909 and the club's seventh consecutive season in the top flight of Italian football. In addition to the domestic league, Bologna participated in this season's edition of the Coppa Italia.

== Players ==
=== First-team squad ===
As of 31 January 2022

Note: Flags indicate national team as defined under FIFA eligibility rules; some limited exceptions apply. Players may hold more than one non-FIFA nationality.

No.	Pos.	Nation	Player
2	DF	ENG	Luis Binks
3	DF	SCO	Aaron Hickey
4	DF	ITA	Kevin Bonifazi
5	DF	FRA	Adama Soumaoro
6	DF	BEL	Arthur Theate (on loan from Oostende)
7	FW	ITA	Riccardo Orsolini
8	MF	ARG	Nicolás Domínguez
9	FW	AUT	Marko Arnautović
10	FW	ITA	Nicola Sansone
11	MF	CHI	Luis Rojas (on loan from Crotone)
12	GK	ALB	Marco Molla
14	MF	ITA	Nicolas Viola
15	DF	SEN	Ibrahima Mbaye
16	MF	NGR	Kingsley Michael
17	DF	CHI	Gary Medel
19	FW	PAR	Federico Santander

No.	Pos.	Nation	Player
20	MF	SUI	Michel Aebischer (on loan from Young Boys)
21	MF	ITA	Roberto Soriano (captain)
22	GK	ITA	Francesco Bardi
28	GK	POL	Łukasz Skorupski
29	DF	ITA	Lorenzo De Silvestri (vice-captain)
30	MF	NED	Jerdy Schouten
32	MF	SWE	Mattias Svanberg
33	MF	FIN	Niklas Pyyhtiä
35	DF	NED	Mitchell Dijks
55	MF	ITA	Emanuel Vignato
66	DF	ITA	Wisdom Amey
71	DF	NED	Denso Kasius
77	DF	GHA	Ebenezer Annan
91	FW	ITA	Diego Falcinelli
99	FW	GAM	Musa Barrow
—	FW	GAM	Musa Juwara

=== Out on loan ===
As of 1 February 2022

Note: Flags indicate national team as defined under FIFA eligibility rules; some limited exceptions apply. Players may hold more than one non-FIFA nationality.

No.	Pos.	Nation	Player
—	GK	CAN	Sebastian Breza (at CF Montréal until 31 December 2022)
—	GK	ITA	Federico Ravaglia (at Frosinone until 30 June 2022)
—	DF	ITA	Emanuele Acampora (at Sona until 30 June 2022)
—	DF	ITA	Gabriele Corbo (at CF Montréal until 31 December 2022)
—	DF	NED	Stefano Denswil (at Trabzonspor until 30 June 2022)
—	DF	MAR	Omar Khailoti (at Carrarese until 30 June 2022)
—	MF	ISL	Andri Baldursson (at Copenhagen until 30 June 2022)

No.	Pos.	Nation	Player
—	MF	URU	César Falletti (at Ternana until 30 June 2022)
—	FW	ITA	Gianmarco Cangiano (at Crotone until 30 June 2022)
—	FW	ITA	Flavio Di Dio (at Picerno until 30 June 2022)
—	FW	NGR	Orji Okwonkwo (at Cittadella until 30 June 2022)
—	FW	ITA	Simone Rabbi (at Piacenza until 30 June 2022)
—	FW	NED	Sydney van Hooijdonk (at SC Heerenveen until 30 June 2022)

== Transfers ==
=== In ===
No.	Pos	Player	Transferred from	Fee	Date	Source
2	DF	(England) Luis Binks	(Canada) CF Montréal	Undisclosed	1 July 2021	
4	DF	(Italy) Kevin Bonifazi	(Italy) SPAL	Undisclosed	2 July 2021	
99	FW	(The Gambia) Musa Barrow	(Italy) Atalanta	Undisclosed	2 July 2021	
20	FW	(Netherlands) Sydney van Hooijdonk	(Netherlands) NAC	Undisclosed	3 July 2021	
5	DF	(France) Adama Soumaoro	(France) Lille	Undisclosed	3 July 2021	
22	GK	(Italy) Francesco Bardi	(Italy) Frosinone	Undisclosed	17 July 2021	
9	FW	(Austria) Marko Arnautović	(China) Shanghai Port	Undisclosed	1 August 2021	
6	DF	(Belgium) Arthur Theate	(Belgium) Oostende	Undisclosed	26 August 2021	

== Pre-season and friendlies ==
Win Draw Loss Fixtures

18 July 2021 Friendly	Bologna (Italy)	6–1	(Italy) Bagnolese	Pinzolo, Italy
17:00 CEST (UTC+2)	Orsolini 5', 24'; Sansone 26'; Bonifazi 30'; Van Hooijdonk 39'; Denswil 85'	Report	Selmani 53' (pen.)	Stadium: Stadio Pineta; Attendance: 0
Note: The match was played in two halves 40 minutes each.

24 July 2021 Friendly	Bologna (Italy)	1–0	(Italy) Feralpisalò	Pinzolo, Italy
16:30 CEST (UTC+2)	Raimondo 84'	Report		Stadium: Stadio Pineta; Attendance: 0 Referee: Roberto Lovison

30 July 2021 Friendly	Borussia Dortmund (Germany)	3–0	(Italy) Bologna	Altach, Austria
18:30 CEST (UTC+2)	Reyna 24'; Maloney 42', (yellow card) 64'; Tigges 45+1'	Report		Stadium: Stadion Schnabelholz; Attendance: 5,978; Referee: Dominik Ouschan

5 August 2021 Friendly	Liverpool (England)	2–0	(Italy) Bologna	Thonon-les-Bains, France
16:00 CEST (UTC+2)	Jota 7'; Mané 14'	Report		Stadium: Stade Joseph-Moynat; Attendance: 0 Referee: Jérémie Pignard

5 August 2021 Friendly	Liverpool (England)	1–0	(Italy) Bologna	Thonon-les-Bains, France
18:00 CEST (UTC+2)	Minamino 14'; Origi (penalty missed) 46'	Report		Stadium: Stade Joseph-Moynat; Attendance: 0 Referee: Hakim Ben El Hadj

8 August 2021 Friendly	Pordenone (Italy)	2–4	(Italy) Bologna	Lignano Sabbiadoro, Italy
20:30 CEST (UTC+2)	Pellegrini 8'; Ciciretti 88'	Report	De Silvestri 16'; Domínguez 37'; Vignato 49'; Santander 81'	Stadium: Stadio Guido Teghil; Attendance: 1,000; Referee: Marco Piccinini

== Competitions ==
=== Overall record ===
Competition	First match	Last match	Starting round	Final position	Record							
Competition	First match	Last match	Starting round	Final position	Pld	W	D	L	GF	GA	GD	Win %
Serie A	22 August 2021	21 May 2022	Matchday 1	13th	38	12	10	16	44	55	−11	31.58
Coppa Italia	16 August 2021		First round	First round	1	0	0	1	4	5	−1	0.00
Total					39	12	10	17	48	60	−12	30.77

Last updated: 21 May 2022
Source: Soccerway

=== Serie A ===
==== League table ====
Pos	Team	Pld	W	D	L	GF	GA	GD	Pts
11	Sassuolo	38	13	11	14	64	66	−2	50 (Note: Torino finished ahead of Sassuolo on head-to-head points: Sassuolo 0–1 Torino, Torino 1–1 Sassuolo.)
12	Udinese	38	11	14	13	61	58	+3	47
13	Bologna	38	12	10	16	44	55	−11	46
14	Empoli	38	10	11	17	50	70	−20	41
15	Sampdoria	38	10	6	22	46	63	−17	36

Source: Serie A
Rules for classification: 1) Points; 2) Head-to-head points; 3) Head-to-head goal difference; 4) Goal difference; 5) Goals scored; 6) Draw. (Note: Head-to-head record is used only after all the matches between the teams in question have been played)

==== Results summary ====
Overall								Home						Away					
Pld	W	D	L	GF	GA	GD	Pts	W	D	L	GF	GA	GD	W	D	L	GF	GA	GD
38	12	10	16	44	55	−11	46	8	4	7	25	24	+1	4	6	9	19	31	−12

Last updated: 21 May 2022.
Source: Serie A

==== Results by round ====
Round	1	2	3	4	5	6	7	8	9	10	11	12	13	14	15	16	17	18	19	20	21	22	23	24	25	26	27	28	29	30	31	32	33	34	35	36	37	38
Ground	H	A	H	A	H	A	H	A	H	A	H	A	H	A	H	H	A	H	A	H	A	H	A	H	A	H	A	H	A	H	A	H	A	H	A	A	H	A
Result	W	D	W	L	D	L	W	D	L	L	W	W	L	W	W	L	L	L	W	W	L	L	L	D	L	W	D	D	L	L	D	W	D	D	D	L	L	W
Position	5	7	6	9	8	11	9	8	9	12	10	9	10	9	8	9	10	12	10	11	13	13	13	13	13	12	12	12	12	12	12	12	13	13	13	13	13	13

Updated to match(es) played on 21 May 2022. Source: Serie A
A = Away; H = Home; W = Win; D = Draw; L = Loss

==== Matches ====
The league fixtures were announced on 14 July 2021.

22 August 2021 1	Bologna	3–2	Salernitana	Bologna
18:30 CEST (UTC+2)	Soriano (yellow card) 41' (yellow-red card) 50'; Schouten (yellow card) 55' (yellow-red card) 88'; De Silvestri 59', 77'; Arnautović 75'; Bonifazi (yellow card) 87'; Sansone (yellow card) 90+1'	Report	Strandberg (yellow card) 33' (yellow-red card) 34'; Bonazzoli 52' (pen.); Coulibaly 70'; Jaroszyński (yellow card) 79'	Stadium: Stadio Renato Dall'Ara; Attendance: 8,375; Referee: Antonio Rapuano

28 August 2021 2	Atalanta	0–0	Bologna	Bergamo
18:30 CEST (UTC+2)	Gosens (yellow card) 36'; Palomino (yellow card) 79'	Report	Medel (yellow card) 35'; Sansone (yellow card) 49'; Arnautović (yellow card) 53'; Hickey (yellow card) 58'; Svanberg (yellow card) 64'	Stadium: Gewiss Stadium; Attendance: 7,912; Referee: Daniele Orsato

13 September 2021 3	Bologna	1–0	Hellas Verona	Bologna
20:45 CEST (UTC+2)	Svanberg 78'; Domínguez (yellow card) 90+7'	Report	Barák (yellow card) 49'; Ceccherini (yellow card) 84'; Faraoni (yellow card) 90+8'	Stadium: Stadio Renato Dall'Ara; Attendance: 10,218; Referee: Ivano Pezzuto

18 September 2021 4	Internazionale	6–1	Bologna	Milan
18:00 CEST (UTC+2)	Martínez 6'; Škriniar 30'; Barella 34'; Vecino 54'; Džeko 63', 68'	Report	De Silvestri (yellow card) 23'; Hickey (yellow card) 36'; Dijks (yellow card) 83'; Theate 86'	Stadium: San Siro; Attendance: 35,278; Referee: Giovanni Ayroldi

21 September 2021 5	Bologna	2–2	Genoa	Bologna
18:30 CEST (UTC+2)	Domínguez (yellow card) 30'; Hickey 49'; Bonifazi (yellow card) 58'; Medel (yellow card) 71'; Arnautović 85' (pen.)	Report	Farès (yellow card) 43'; Destro 55', (yellow card) 56'; Behrami (yellow card) 60'; Vanheusden (yellow card) 84'; Criscito 89' (pen.)	Stadium: Stadio Renato Dall'Ara; Attendance: 9,707; Referee: Francesco Fourneau

26 September 2021 6	Empoli	4–2	Bologna	Empoli
15:00 CEST (UTC+2)	Bonifazi 1' (o.g.); Pinamonti 32', (yellow card) 67'; Henderson (yellow card) 34'; Bajrami 53' (pen.); Ricci 90'	Report	Barrow 11'; Arnautović (penalty missed) 20', 77'; Vignato (yellow card) 24'; Orsolini (yellow card) 90+3'	Stadium: Stadio Carlo Castellani; Attendance: 5,022; Referee: Piero Giacomelli

3 October 2021 7	Bologna	3–0	Lazio	Bologna
12:30 CEST (UTC+2)	Barrow 14'; Theate 17'; Soumaoro (yellow card) 53'; Hickey 68'; De Silvestri (yellow card) 90+5'	Report	Milinković-Savić (yellow card) 52'; Pedro (yellow card) 66'; Lazzari (yellow card) 75'; Acerbi (yellow card) 76' (yellow-red card) 77'; Luiz Felipe (yellow card) 90+2'	Stadium: Stadio Renato Dall'Ara; Attendance: 12,975; Referee: Davide Massa

17 October 2021 8	Udinese	1–1	Bologna	Udine
15:00 CEST (UTC+2)	Pereyra (yellow card) 23' (yellow-red card) 38'; Beto 83'	Report	Svanberg (yellow card) 49'; Barrow 67'; Vignato (yellow card) 82'; Skorupski (yellow card) 84'; Soumaoro (yellow card) 84'; Domínguez (yellow card) 87'; Hickey (yellow card) 90'; Soriano (yellow card) 90+4'	Stadium: Stadio Friuli; Attendance: 10,627; Referee: Rosario Abisso

23 October 2021 9	Bologna	2–4	Milan	Bologna
20:45 CEST (UTC+2)	Soumaoro (red card) 20'; Arnautović (yellow card) 34'; Ibrahimović 49' (o.g.); Barrow 52'; Soriano (red card) 58'	Report	Leão 16'; Calabria 35', (yellow card) 61'; Tonali (yellow card) 45+1'; Saelemaekers (yellow card) 67'; Bennacer 84'; Ibrahimović 90'	Stadium: Stadio Renato Dall'Ara; Attendance: 22,167; Referee: Paolo Valeri

28 October 2021 10	Napoli	3–0	Bologna	Naples
20:45 CEST (UTC+2)	Fabián 18'; Zambo Anguissa (yellow card) 32'; Insigne 41' (pen.), 62' (pen.)	Report	Medel (yellow card) 40'	Stadium: Stadio San Paolo; Attendance: 19,000; Referee: Marco Serra

1 November 2021 11	Bologna	2–0	Cagliari	Bologna
20:45 CET (UTC+1)	Svanberg (yellow card) 40'; De Silvestri 49'; Hickey (yellow card) 70'; Medel (yellow card) 90+1'; Arnautović 90+6'	Report	João Pedro (yellow card) 68'; Cáceres (red card) 90'; Pavoletti (yellow card) 90+3'	Stadium: Stadio Renato Dall'Ara; Attendance: 10,126; Referee: Davide Massa

7 November 2021 12	Sampdoria	1–2	Bologna	Genoa
15:00 CET (UTC+1)	Gabbiadini (yellow card) 33'; Colley (yellow card) 34'; Thorsby 77'; Ekdal (yellow card) 90'; Murru (yellow card) 90+2'	Report	Hickey (yellow card) 11'; Svanberg 47'; Arnautović 78'	Stadium: Stadio Luigi Ferraris; Attendance: 5,694; Referee: Gianluca Manganiello

21 November 2021 13	Bologna	0–1	Venezia	Bologna
15:00 CET (UTC+1)		Report	Busio (yellow card) 47'; Okereke 61'; Haps (yellow card) 73'; Romero (yellow card) 87'	Stadium: Stadio Renato Dall'Ara; Attendance: 15,255; Referee: Daniele Chiffi

28 November 2021 14	Spezia	0–1	Bologna	La Spezia
15:00 CET (UTC+1)	Reca (yellow card) 38'; Salcedo (yellow card) 71'; Nzola (yellow card) 82'	Report	Arnautović 83' (pen.), (yellow card) 88'	Stadium: Stadio Alberto Picco; Attendance: 6,265; Referee: Luca Massimi

1 December 2021 15	Bologna	1–0	Roma	Bologna
18:30 CET (UTC+1)	Svanberg 35'; Soriano (yellow card) 38'; Skorupski (yellow card) 88'; Sansone (yellow card) 90+2'	Report	Abraham (yellow card) 45+1'; Pérez (yellow card) 59'; Zaniolo (yellow card) 72'; Karsdorp (yellow card) 90+2'	Stadium: Stadio Renato Dall'Ara; Attendance: 15,780; Referee: Luca Pairetto

5 December 2021 16	Bologna	2–3	Fiorentina	Bologna
12:30 CET (UTC+1)	Domínguez (yellow card) 24'; Barrow 42'; Theate (yellow card) 50'; Hickey 83'; Soumaoro (yellow card) 90+4'	Report	Torreira (yellow card) 25'; Maleh 33'; Biraghi 52'; Milenković (yellow card) 64'; Vlahović 67' (pen.); Amrabat (yellow card) 90'	Stadium: Stadio Renato Dall'Ara; Attendance: 18,175; Referee: Massimiliano Irrati

12 December 2021 17	Torino	2–1	Bologna	Turin
12:30 CET (UTC+1)	Sanabria 24'; Soumaoro 69' (o.g.)	Report	Orsolini 79' (pen.)	Stadium: Stadio Olimpico Grande Torino; Attendance: 6,562; Referee: Federico Dionisi

18 December 2021 18	Bologna	0–2	Juventus	Bologna
18:00 CET (UTC+1)	Domínguez (yellow card) 29'	Report	Morata 6'; McKennie (yellow card) 29'; Cuadrado 69'	Stadium: Stadio Renato Dall'Ara; Attendance: 22,394; Referee: Daniele Orsato

22 December 2021 19	Sassuolo	0–3	Bologna	Reggio Emilia
16:30 CET (UTC+1)	Magnanelli (yellow card) 90'	Report	Orsolini 36'; Hickey 44'; Svanberg (yellow card) 59'; Domínguez (yellow card) 64'; Santander (yellow card) 76', (goal) 90+4'	Stadium: Mapei Stadium – Città del Tricolore; Attendance: 4,763; Referee: Michael Fabbri

11 January 2022 21	Cagliari	2–1	Bologna	Cagliari
20:45 CET (UTC+1)	Carboni (yellow card) 14'; Altare (yellow card) 19'; Deiola (yellow card) 57'; Pavoletti 71'; Pereiro 90+3'	Report	Theate (yellow card) 15'; Orsolini 54'; De Silvestri (yellow card) 86'	Stadium: Unipol Domus; Attendance: 5,583; Referee: Davide Ghersini

17 January 2022 22	Bologna	0–2	Napoli	Bologna
18:30 CET (UTC+1)	Soumaoro (yellow card) 43'; Theate (yellow card) 57'; Binks (yellow card) 90+4'	Report	Lozano 20', 47'; Zieliński (yellow card) 52'	Stadium: Stadio Renato Dall'Ara; Attendance: 5,000; Referee: Livio Marinelli

21 January 2022 23	Hellas Verona	2–1	Bologna	Verona
20:45 CET (UTC+1)	Caprari 38'; Simeone (yellow card) 43'; Günter (yellow card) 60'; Kalinić 85'	Report	Orsolini 14'; Skorupski (yellow card) 27'; Binks (yellow card) 45+1'; Sansone (yellow card) 50'; Hickey (yellow card) 73'	Stadium: Stadio Marcantonio Bentegodi; Attendance: 4,286; Referee: Matteo Gariglio

6 February 2022 24	Bologna	0–0	Empoli	Bologna
15:00 CET (UTC+1)	Schouten (yellow card) 23'; De Silvestri (yellow card) 40'	Report	Asllani (yellow card) 31'; Bandinelli (yellow card) 40'; Parisi (yellow card) 59'; Cacace (yellow card) 90'	Stadium: Stadio Renato Dall'Ara; Attendance: 5,000; Referee: Francesco Cosso

12 February 2022 25	Lazio	3–0	Bologna	Rome
15:00 CET (UTC+1)	Immobile 13' (pen.); Luis Alberto (yellow card) 40'; Zaccagni 53', 63'; Lucas (yellow card) 59'	Report	Svanberg (yellow card) 20'; Medel (yellow card) 45'	Stadium: Stadio Olimpico; Attendance: 22,000; Referee: Marco Piccinini

21 February 2022 26	Bologna	2–1	Spezia	Bologna
21:00 CET (UTC+1)	Binks (yellow card) 19'; Arnautović 40', 84'	Report	Manaj 11', (yellow card) 22'	Stadium: Stadio Renato Dall'Ara; Attendance: 12,050; Referee: Livio Marinelli

26 February 2022 27	Salernitana	1–1	Bologna	Salerno
15:05 CET (UTC+1)	Ranieri (yellow card) 7'; Coulibaly (yellow card) 70'; Zortea 72'	Report	Arnautović 43', (yellow card) 79'; Soriano (yellow card) 59'; De Silvestri (yellow card) 82'	Stadium: Stadio Arechi; Attendance: 13,289; Referee: Giovanni Ayroldi

6 March 2022 28	Bologna	0–0	Torino	Bologna
15:00 CET (UTC+1)	Schouten (yellow card) 26'; Theate (yellow card) 63'; Medel (yellow card) 70'	Report	Pobega (yellow card) 34'; Ricci (yellow card) 68'; Rodriguez (yellow card) 78'	Stadium: Stadio Renato Dall'Ara; Attendance: 17,575; Referee: Luca Massimi

13 March 2022 29	Fiorentina	1–0	Bologna	Florence
12:30 CET (UTC+1)	Torreira 70', (yellow card) 76'	Report	Bonifazi (yellow card) 23' (yellow-red card) 41'; Soumaoro (yellow card) 73'; Hickey (yellow card) 86'; Sansone (yellow card) 90+3'	Stadium: Stadio Artemio Franchi; Attendance: 22,635; Referee: Juan Luca Sacchi

20 March 2022 30	Bologna	0–1	Atalanta	Bologna
20:45 CET (UTC+1)		Report	Demiral (yellow card) 66'; Cissé 82'	Stadium: Stadio Renato Dall'Ara; Attendance: 13,323; Referee: Fabio Maresca

4 April 2022 31	Milan	0–0	Bologna	Milan
20:45 CEST (UTC+2)		Report	Dijks (yellow card) 41'; Orsolini (yellow card) 90+8'	Stadium: San Siro; Attendance: 68,136; Referee: Livio Marinelli

11 April 2022 32	Bologna	2–0	Sampdoria	Bologna
20:45 CEST (UTC+2)	Svanberg (yellow card) 38'; Arnautović 61', 76'	Report	Sabiri (yellow card) 10'; Ferrari (yellow card) 59'	Stadium: Stadio Renato Dall'Ara; Attendance: 15,783; Referee: Luca Pairetto

16 April 2022 33	Juventus	1–1	Bologna	Turin
18:30 CEST (UTC+2)	Cuadrado (yellow card) 31'; Vlahović 90+5'	Report	Theate (yellow card) 13'; Svanberg (yellow card) 18'; Arnautović (yellow card) 41', (goal) 52'; Soumaoro (red card) 84'; Medel (yellow card) 84' (yellow-red card) 84'	Stadium: Juventus Stadium; Attendance: 36,107; Referee: Juan Luca Sacchi

24 April 2022 34	Bologna	2–2	Udinese	Bologna
15:00 CEST (UTC+2)	Hickey 6'; Sansone 59', (yellow card) 70'; De Silvestri (yellow card) 81'	Report	Udogie 25'; Pérez (yellow card) 30'; Success 46'; Pussetto (yellow card) 90'	Stadium: Stadio Renato Dall'Ara; Attendance: 15,922; Referee: Alberto Santoro

27 April 2022 20	Bologna	2–1	Internazionale	Bologna
20:15 CEST (UTC+2)	Arnautović 28', (yellow card) 55'; Sansone 81'	Report	Perišić 3'; Barella (yellow card) 56'; Dumfries (yellow card) 70'; Çalhanoğlu (yellow card) 79'	Stadium: Stadio Renato Dall'Ara; Attendance: 26,034; Referee: Daniele Doveri
Note: The match was originally scheduled for 6 January 2022, but was postponed to 27 April 2022 due to COVID-19 outbreaks within the squads.

1 May 2022 35	Roma	0–0	Bologna	Rome
20:45 CEST (UTC+2)		Report	Medel (yellow card) 41'	Stadium: Stadio Olimpico; Attendance: 62,988; Referee: Michael Fabbri

8 May 2022 36	Venezia	4–3	Bologna	Venice
15:00 CEST (UTC+2)	Henry 4'; Kiyine (penalty missed) 19', 19', (yellow card) 30'; Matějů (yellow card) 77'; Aramu 78' (pen.); Johnsen 90+3'	Report	Skorupski (yellow card) 16'; Hickey (yellow card) 38'; Orsolini 45+1'; Arnautović 55'; Schouten 68'; Medel (yellow card) 77'; Domínguez (yellow card) 80'	Stadium: Stadio Pier Luigi Penzo; Attendance: 6,674; Referee: Livio Marinelli

15 May 2022 37	Bologna	1–3	Sassuolo	Bologna
12:30 CEST (UTC+2)	Orsolini 90+1' (pen.)	Report	Scamacca 35', 80'; Raspadori (yellow card) 57'; Berardi 75'	Stadium: Stadio Renato Dall'Ara; Attendance: 19,794; Referee: Davide Ghersini

21 May 2022 38	Genoa	0–1	Bologna	Genoa
17:15 CEST (UTC+2)	Galdames (yellow card) 38'; Criscito (yellow card) 54'; Østigård (yellow card) 58'	Report	Aebischer (yellow card) 25'; Barrow 66'	Stadium: Stadio Luigi Ferraris; Attendance: 17,768; Referee: Gianpiero Miele

=== Coppa Italia ===
16 August 2021 First round	Bologna	4–5	Ternana	Bologna
18:00 CEST (UTC+2)	Domínguez 38'; Mbaye (yellow card) 52'; Arnautović 56'; Soriano 58'; Orsolini 76' (pen.)	Report	Agazzi 6'; Donnarumma (penalty missed) 10', 21'; Sørensen (yellow card) 26'; Peralta 40', 54'; Falletti 50' (pen.); Salzano (yellow card) 59'; Celli (yellow card) 66'; Iannarilli (yellow card) 83'	Stadium: Stadio Renato Dall'Ara; Attendance: 5,360; Referee: Luca Zufferli

== Statistics ==
=== Appearances and goals ===
No.	Pos	Nat	Player	Total		Serie A		Coppa Italia	
No.	Pos	Nat	Player	Apps	Goals	Apps	Goals	Apps	Goals
Goalkeepers
12	GK	(Albania) ALB	Marco Molla	0	0	0	0	0	0
22	GK	(Italy) ITA	Francesco Bardi	2	0	2	0	0	0
23	GK	(Italy) ITA	Nicola Bagnolini	1	0	0+1	0	0	0
28	GK	(Poland) POL	Lukasz Skorupski	13	0	12	0	1	0
Defenders
2	DF	(England) ENG	Luis Binks	15	0	7+8	0	0	0
3	DF	(Scotland) SCO	Aaron Hickey	36	5	34+2	5	0	0
4	DF	(Italy) ITA	Kevin Bonifazi	23	0	14+8	0	1	0
5	DF	(France) FRA	Adama Soumaoro	29	0	26+2	0	1	0
6	DF	(Belgium) BEL	Arthur Theate	31	2	28+3	2	0	0
15	DF	(Senegal) SEN	Ibrahima Mbaye	7	0	1+5	0	1	0
17	DF	(Chile) CHI	Gary Medel	34	0	32+1	0	0+1	0
29	DF	(Italy) ITA	Lorenzo De Silvestri	31	3	27+4	3	0	0
31	DF	(Italy) ITA	Riccardo Stivanello	1	0	0+1	0	0	0
35	DF	(Netherlands) NED	Mitchell Dijks	16	0	7+9	0	0	0
66	DF	(Italy) ITA	Wisdom Amey	1	0	1	0	0	0
71	DF	(Netherlands) NED	Denso Kasius	7	0	1+6	0	0	0
77	DF	(Italy) ITA	Ebenezer Annan	2	0	0+1	0	1	0
Midfielders
8	MF	(Argentina) ARG	Nicolás Domínguez	29	1	23+5	0	1	1
11	MF	(Chile) CHI	Luis Rojas	28	0	23+5	0	0	0
14	MF	(Italy) ITA	Nicolas Viola	6	0	1+5	0	0	0
16	MF	(Nigeria) NGR	Kingsley Michael	2	0	1+1	0	0	0
21	MF	(Italy) ITA	Roberto Soriano	36	1	32+3	0	1	1
30	MF	(Netherlands) NED	Jerdy Schouten	18	1	16+1	1	1	0
32	MF	(Sweden) SWE	Mattias Svanberg	37	3	31+5	3	0+1	0
33	MF	(Finland) FIN	Niklas Pyyhtiä	1	0	0+1	0	0	0
55	MF	(Italy) ITA	Emanuel Vignato	1	0	0	0	1	0
82	MF	(Poland) POL	Kacper Urbański	1	0	0+1	0	0	0
Forwards
7	FW	(Italy) ITA	Riccardo Orsolini	30	7	21+8	6	1	1
9	FW	(Austria) AUT	Marko Arnautović	34	15	32+1	14	1	1
10	FW	(Italy) ITA	Nicola Sansone	27	2	6+21	2	0	0
19	FW	(Paraguay) PAR	Federico Santander	7	1	0+7	1	0	0
44	FW	(Italy) ITA	Mattia Pagliuca	0	0	0	0	0	0
55	FW	(Italy) ITA	Emanuel Vignato	24	0	3+21	0	0	0
76	FW	(Italy) ITA	Antonio Raimondo	1	0	1	0	0	0
91	FW	(Italy) ITA	Diego Falcinelli	6	0	0+6	0	0	0
99	FW	(The Gambia) GAM	Musa Barrow	35	6	25+9	6	0+1	0
Players transferred out during the season
11	FW	(Denmark) DEN	Andreas Skov Olsen	19	0	6+12	0	0+1	0
14	DF	(Japan) JPN	Takehiro Tomiyasu	1	0	0+1	0	0	0
20	FW	(Netherlands) NED	Sydney van Hooijdonk	5	0	0+4	0	0+1	0

Last updated: 21 May 2022
Source: Competitions
