= 2020–21 Bologna FC 1909 season =

Bologna
2020–21 season
- Chairman: Joey Saputo
- Head coach: Siniša Mihajlović
- Stadium: Stadio Renato Dall'Ara
- Serie A: 12th
- Coppa Italia: Fourth round
- Top goalscorer: League: Roberto Soriano (9); All: Musa Barrow; Riccardo Orsolini; Roberto Soriano (9 each)
Home colours	Away colours	Third colours

The 2020–21 season was the 111th season in existence of Bologna and the club's sixth consecutive season in the top flight of Italian football. In addition to the domestic league, Bologna participated in this season's edition of the Coppa Italia. The season covered the period from 3 August 2020 to 30 June 2021.

== Players ==
=== First-team squad ===
As of 1 February 2021

Note: Flags indicate national team as defined under FIFA eligibility rules; some limited exceptions apply. Players may hold more than one non-FIFA nationality.

No.	Pos.	Nation	Player
1	GK	BRA	Angelo Da Costa
3	DF	SCO	Aaron Hickey
5	DF	FRA	Adama Soumaoro (on loan from Lille)
7	FW	ITA	Riccardo Orsolini
8	MF	ARG	Nicolás Domínguez
9	FW	PAR	Federico Santander
10	FW	ITA	Nicola Sansone
11	FW	DEN	Andreas Skov Olsen
14	DF	JPN	Takehiro Tomiyasu
15	DF	SEN	Ibrahima Mbaye
16	MF	ITA	Andrea Poli (captain)
17	DF	CHI	Gary Medel
18	MF	ISL	Andri Baldursson
20	GK	CAN	Sebastian Breza

No.	Pos.	Nation	Player
21	MF	ITA	Roberto Soriano
23	DF	BRA	Danilo
24	FW	ARG	Rodrigo Palacio (vice-captain)
26	DF	BUL	Valentin Antov (on loan from CSKA Sofia)
28	GK	POL	Łukasz Skorupski
29	DF	ITA	Lorenzo De Silvestri
30	MF	NED	Jerdy Schouten
32	MF	SWE	Mattias Svanberg
34	GK	ITA	Federico Ravaglia
35	DF	NED	Mitchell Dijks
43	DF	ITA	Paolo Faragò (on loan from Cagliari)
55	MF	ITA	Emanuel Vignato
80	FW	GAM	Musa Juwara
99	FW	GAM	Musa Barrow

== Transfers ==
=== In ===
Date	Pos.	Player	Age	Moving from	Fee	Notes	Source
13 August 2020	DF	Luis Binks	18	Montreal Impact	Undisclosed		

=== Out ===
Date	Pos.	Player	Age	Moving to	Fee	Notes	Source
4 August 2020	FW	Ladislav Krejčí	28	Sparta Prague	Free transfer		

==== Loans out ====
Date	Pos.	Player	Age	Moving to	Fee	Notes	Source
5 August 2020	FW	Leonardo Stanzani	20	Pontedera	N/A	loan until June 2021	
13 August 2020	DF	Luis Binks	18	Montreal Impact	N/A	loan until December 2020	
20 August 2020	DF	Elia Visconti	20	Piacenza	N/A	loan until June 2021	
20 August 2020	MF	Leonardo Mazza	19	Mantova	N/A	loan until June 2021	

== Pre-season and friendlies ==
Win Draw Loss

5 September 2020 Friendly	Bologna	2–0	Feralpisalò	Pinzolo, Italy
17:00 CEST (UTC+2)				Stadium: Stadio Pineta

12 September 2020 Friendly	Bologna	0–0	Virtus Entella	Bologna, Italy
15:00 CEST (UTC+2)				Stadium: Centro tecnico Niccolò Galli

== Competitions ==
=== Overview ===
Competition	First match	Last match	Starting round	Final position	Record							
Competition	First match	Last match	Starting round	Final position	Pld	W	D	L	GF	GA	GD	Win %
Serie A	21 September 2020	23 May 2021	Matchday 1	12th	38	10	11	17	51	65	−14	26.32
Coppa Italia	27 October 2020	25 November 2020	Third round	Fourth round	2	1	0	1	4	3	+1	50.00
Total					40	11	11	18	55	68	−13	27.50

Last updated: 23 May 2021
Source: Soccerway

=== Serie A ===
==== League table ====
Pos	Team	Pld	W	D	L	GF	GA	GD	Pts
10	Hellas Verona	38	11	12	15	46	48	−2	45
11	Genoa	38	10	12	16	47	58	−11	42
12	Bologna	38	10	11	17	51	65	−14	41
13	Fiorentina	38	9	13	16	47	59	−12	40
14	Udinese	38	10	10	18	42	58	−16	40

Source: Serie A, Soccerway
Rules for classification: 1) Points; 2) Head-to-head points; 3) Head-to-head goal difference; 4) Goal difference; 5) Goals scored; 6) Draw. (Note: Head-to-head record is used only after all the matches between the teams in question have been played)

==== Results summary ====
Overall								Home						Away					
Pld	W	D	L	GF	GA	GD	Pts	W	D	L	GF	GA	GD	W	D	L	GF	GA	GD
38	10	11	17	51	65	−14	41	7	5	7	33	33	0	3	6	10	18	32	−14

Last updated: 23 May 2021.
Source: Serie A

==== Results by round ====
Round	1	2	3	4	5	6	7	8	9	10	11	12	13	14	15	16	17	18	19	20	21	22	23	24	25	26	27	28	29	30	31	32	33	34	35	36	37	38
Ground	A	H	A	H	A	H	H	A	H	A	H	A	A	H	A	H	A	H	A	H	A	H	A	H	A	A	H	A	H	A	H	H	A	H	A	H	A	H
Result	L	W	L	L	L	W	L	W	W	L	L	D	D	D	D	D	L	W	L	L	W	D	D	W	L	L	W	W	L	L	W	D	L	D	D	L	D	L
Position	16	8	12	16	17	13	14	12	10	10	12	13	14	13	12	12	13	12	13	15	13	12	12	11	12	12	12	11	11	11	11	11	12	12	12	11	11	12

Updated to match(es) played on 23 May 2021. Source: Serie A
A = Away; H = Home; W = Win; D = Draw; L = Loss

==== Matches ====
The league fixtures were announced on 2 September 2020.

21 September 2020 1	Milan	2–0	Bologna	Milan
20:45 CEST (UTC+2)	Ibrahimović 35', 50' (pen.); Castillejo (yellow card) 40'; Krunić (yellow card) 86'; Gabbia (yellow card) 89'	Report	Domínguez (yellow card) 18'; Dijks (yellow card) 31' (yellow-red card) 88'; Tomiyasu (yellow card) 74'; Sansone (yellow card) 82'	Stadium: San Siro; Referee: Federico La Penna

28 September 2020 2	Bologna	4–1	Parma	Bologna
20:45 CEST (UTC+2)	Soriano 16', 30'; Olsen 56'; Sansone (yellow card) 86'; Palacio 90+2'	Report	Kucka (yellow card) 60'; Hernani 67'; Laurini (yellow card) 70'; Iacoponi (red card) 76'	Stadium: Stadio Renato Dall'Ara; Referee: Paolo Valeri

4 October 2020 3	Benevento	1–0	Bologna	Benevento
15:00 CEST (UTC+2)	Lapadula 66'; Schiattarella (yellow card) 79'; Foulon (yellow card) 83'	Report	Svanberg (yellow card) 74'	Stadium: Stadio Ciro Vigorito; Referee: Simone Sozza

18 October 2020 4	Bologna	3–4	Sassuolo	Bologna
12:30 CEST (UTC+2)	Soriano 9'; Svanberg (yellow card) 35', (goal) 39'; Orsolini 60'; Skorupski (yellow card) 73'; Mbaye (yellow card) 75'	Report	Berardi 18'; Đuričić 64'; Caputo 70'; Locatelli (yellow card) 73'; Tomiyasu 77' (o.g.); Ayhan (yellow card) 82'	Stadium: Stadio Renato Dall'Ara; Referee: Daniele Doveri

24 October 2020 5	Lazio	2–1	Bologna	Rome
20:45 CEST (UTC+2)	Acerbi (yellow card) 30'; Luis Alberto 54'; Hoedt (yellow card) 60'; Akpa Akpro (yellow card) 70'; Immobile 76'	Report	Danilo (yellow card) 55'; Tomiyasu (yellow card) 58'; Svanberg (yellow card) 66'; De Silvestri 90+1'	Stadium: Stadio Olimpico; Referee: Massimiliano Irrati

31 October 2020 6	Bologna	3–2	Cagliari	Bologna
20:45 CET (UTC+1)	Danilo (yellow card) 37'; Barrow 45', 56'; Soriano 52'; De Silvestri (yellow card) 65'; Schouten (yellow card) 68'	Report	João Pedro 15', (yellow card) 36'; Lykogiannis (yellow card) 21'; Cragno (yellow card) 40'; Simeone 47'	Stadium: Stadio Renato Dall'Ara; Attendance: 0 Referee: Michael Fabbri

8 November 2020 7	Bologna	0–1	Napoli	Bologna
18:00 CET (UTC+1)	Domínguez (yellow card) 25'; Danilo (yellow card) 27'; Schouten (yellow card) 62'	Report	Osimhen 23'	Stadium: Stadio Renato Dall'Ara; Attendance: 0 Referee: Fabrizio Pasqua

22 November 2020 8	Sampdoria	1–2	Bologna	Genoa
15:00 CET (UTC+1)	Thorsby 7', (yellow card) 70'; Ramírez (yellow card) 71'	Report	Hickey (yellow card) 9'; Palacio (yellow card) 42'; Regini 44' (o.g.); Orsolini 52'	Stadium: Stadio Luigi Ferraris; Attendance: 0 Referee: Livio Marinelli

29 November 2020 9	Bologna	1–0	Crotone	Bologna
15:00 CET (UTC+1)	Hickey (yellow card) 30'; Soriano 45+2'; Palacio (yellow card) 74'	Report	Petriccione (yellow card) 15'; Marrone (yellow card) 19'; Magallán (yellow card) 58'; Luperto (yellow card) 72'	Stadium: Stadio Renato Dall'Ara; Attendance: 0 Referee: Marco Serra

5 December 2020 10	Internazionale	3–1	Bologna	Milan
20:45 CET (UTC+1)	Lukaku 16'; Hakimi 45', 70', (yellow card) 66'	Report	Hickey (yellow card) 54'; Vignato 67'; Danilo (yellow card) 74'	Stadium: San Siro; Attendance: 0 Referee: Paolo Valeri

13 December 2020 11	Bologna	1–5	Roma	Bologna
15:00 CET (UTC+1)	Cristante 24' (o.g.); Soriano (yellow card) 53'; Vignato (yellow card) 62'; Baldursson (yellow card) 78'; Domínguez (yellow card) 90'	Report	Poli 5' (o.g.); Džeko 10'; Pellegrini 15'; Veretout 35', (yellow card) 43'; Mkhitaryan 44'; Ibañez (yellow card) 49'	Stadium: Stadio Renato Dall'Ara; Attendance: 0 Referee: Gianpaolo Calvarese

16 December 2020 12	Spezia	2–2	Bologna	Cesena
20:45 CET (UTC+1)	Marchizza (yellow card) 16'; Nzola 19', 63'; Gyasi (yellow card) 37'; Agoumé (yellow card) 49'; Chabot (yellow card) 85'; Provedel (yellow card) 90+1'; Erlić (yellow card) 90+3'	Report	Tomiyasu (yellow card) 25'; Domínguez 72'; Barrow 90+2', (penalty missed) 90+6'	Stadium: Stadio Dino Manuzzi; Attendance: 0 Referee: Piero Giacomelli

20 December 2020 13	Torino	1–1	Bologna	Turin
12:30 CET (UTC+1)	Lyanco (yellow card) 32'; Verdi 69'	Report	Domínguez (yellow card) 26'; Svanberg (yellow card) 52'; Tomiyasu (yellow card) 68'; Soriano 78'	Stadium: Stadio Olimpico Grande Torino; Attendance: 0 Referee: Fabrizio Pasqua

23 December 2020 14	Bologna	2–2	Atalanta	Bologna
20:45 CET (UTC+1)	Tomiyasu 73'; Paz 82'; Palacio (yellow card) 84'; Da Costa (yellow card) 86'	Report	Gosens (yellow card) 18'; Muriel 22' (pen.), 23'; Djimsiti (yellow card) 60'	Stadium: Stadio Renato Dall'Ara; Attendance: 0 Referee: Daniele Chiffi

3 January 2021 15	Fiorentina	0–0	Bologna	Florence
15:00 CET (UTC+1)	Igor (yellow card) 69'; Pezzella (yellow card) 71'; Bonaventura (yellow card) 90+2'; Kouamé (yellow card) 90+4'	Report	De Silvestri (yellow card) 4'; Schouten (yellow card) 28'; Domínguez (yellow card) 58'	Stadium: Stadio Artemio Franchi; Attendance: 0 Referee: Daniele Orsato

6 January 2021 16	Bologna	2–2	Udinese	Bologna
15:00 CET (UTC+1)	Tomiyasu 19'; Svanberg (yellow card) 36' (yellow-red card) 47', (goal) 40'; Schouten (yellow card) 60'; Da Costa (yellow card) 86'	Report	Walace (yellow card) 21'; Samir (yellow card) 26'; Pereyra 34'; Lasagna (yellow card) 78'; Arslan 90+2'	Stadium: Stadio Renato Dall'Ara; Attendance: 0 Referee: Giovanni Ayroldi

9 January 2021 17	Genoa	2–0	Bologna	Genoa
18:00 CET (UTC+1)	Zajc 44'; Destro 55'; Radovanović (yellow card) 66'; Ghiglione (yellow card) 87'	Report		Stadium: Stadio Luigi Ferraris; Attendance: 0 Referee: Daniele Doveri

16 January 2021 18	Bologna	1–0	Hellas Verona	Bologna
15:00 CET (UTC+1)	Orsolini 19' (pen.); Dijks (yellow card) 54'; Domínguez (yellow card) 70'	Report	Zaccagni (yellow card) 36'	Stadium: Stadio Renato Dall'Ara; Attendance: 0 Referee: Maurizio Mariani

24 January 2021 19	Juventus	2–0	Bologna	Turin
12:30 CET (UTC+1)	Arthur 15', (yellow card) 52'; Kulusevski (yellow card) 21'; Chiellini (yellow card) 47'; McKennie 71'	Report	Vignato (yellow card) 14'; Dijks (yellow card) 62'	Stadium: Allianz Stadium; Attendance: 0 Referee: Juan Luca Sacchi

30 January 2021 20	Bologna	1–2	Milan	Bologna
15:00 CET (UTC+1)	Dijks (yellow card) 24'; Soriano (yellow card) 56'; Poli 81'	Report	Ibrahimović (penalty missed) 26'; Rebić 26', (yellow card) 51'; Kessié 55' (pen.)	Stadium: Stadio Renato Dall'Ara; Attendance: 0 Referee: Daniele Doveri

7 February 2021 21	Parma	0–3	Bologna	Parma
18:00 CET (UTC+1)	Conti (yellow card) 35'; Gagliolo (yellow card) 75'	Report	Barrow 15', 33'; Svanberg (yellow card) 62'; Orsolini 90+2'	Stadium: Stadio Ennio Tardini; Attendance: 0 Referee: Marco Guida

12 February 2021 22	Bologna	1–1	Benevento	Bologna
20:45 CET (UTC+1)	Sansone 1'; Domínguez (yellow card) 3'; Soriano (yellow card) 64'; Vignato (yellow card) 84'	Report	Viola 60'; Schiattarella (yellow card) 64'; Montipò (yellow card) 90+5'	Stadium: Stadio Renato Dall'Ara; Attendance: 0 Referee: Davide Ghersini

20 February 2021 23	Sassuolo	1–1	Bologna	Reggio Emilia
20:45 CET (UTC+1)	Caputo 52'; Traorè (yellow card) 90+2'	Report	Soriano 17'; Hickey (red card) 30'	Stadium: Mapei Stadium; Attendance: 0 Referee: Federico La Penna

27 February 2021 24	Bologna	2–0	Lazio	Bologna
18:00 CET (UTC+1)	Danilo (yellow card) 9'; Mbaye 19'; Sansone 64'	Report	Immobile (penalty missed) 17'; Patric (yellow card) 40'; Hoedt (yellow card) 81'	Stadium: Stadio Renato Dall'Ara; Attendance: 0 Referee: Piero Giacomelli

3 March 2021 25	Cagliari	1–0	Bologna	Cagliari
20:45 CET (UTC+1)	Nández (yellow card) 15'; Rugani 19'; Cerri (yellow card) 89'	Report	Antov (yellow card) 26'; Schouten (yellow card) 86'	Stadium: Sardegna Arena; Attendance: 0 Referee: Marco Di Bello

7 March 2021 26	Napoli	3–1	Bologna	Naples
20:45 CET (UTC+1)	Insigne 8', 76'; Koulibaly (yellow card) 52'; Osimhen 65'; Mário Rui (yellow card) 85'	Report	Soriano 73'	Stadium: Stadio San Paolo; Attendance: 0 Referee: Daniele Chiffi

14 March 2021 27	Bologna	3–1	Sampdoria	Bologna
12:30 CET (UTC+1)	Barrow 27'; Palacio (yellow card) 32'; Svanberg 41'; Soriano 70'; Olsen (yellow card) 78'	Report	Quagliarella 37'; Ferrari (yellow card) 56'; Ramírez (yellow card) 85'	Stadium: Stadio Renato Dall'Ara; Attendance: 0 Referee: Massimiliano Irrati

20 March 2021 28	Crotone	2–3	Bologna	Crotone
15:00 CET (UTC+1)	Cuomo (yellow card) 22'; Messias 32'; Simy 40' (pen.); Petriccione (yellow card) 42'; Djidji (yellow card) 55'; Golemić (yellow card) 88'	Report	Dijks (yellow card) 23'; Soumaoro (yellow card) 39', (goal) 62'; Domínguez (yellow card) 45+1'; Schouten 70'; Palacio (yellow card) 74'; Soriano (yellow card) 78'; Danilo (yellow card) 81'; Olsen 84'; Skorupski (yellow card) 87'	Stadium: Stadio Ezio Scida; Attendance: 0 Referee: Francesco Fourneau

3 April 2021 29	Bologna	0–1	Internazionale	Bologna
20:45 CEST (UTC+2)	Soumaoro (yellow card) 31'; De Silvestri (yellow card) 61'; Vignato (yellow card) 82'; Juwara (yellow card) 85'	Report	Lukaku 32'; Ranocchia (yellow card) 53'; Brozović (yellow card) 86'; Bastoni (yellow card) 86'; Gagliardini (yellow card) 88'	Stadium: Stadio Renato Dall'Ara; Attendance: 0 Referee: Piero Giacomelli

11 April 2021 30	Roma	1–0	Bologna	Rome
18:00 CEST (UTC+2)	Pedro (yellow card) 36'; Mayoral 44'; Villar (yellow card) 75'; Pellegrini (yellow card) 83'	Report	De Silvestri (yellow card) 38'; Soumaoro (yellow card) 81'	Stadium: Stadio Olimpico; Attendance: 0 Referee: Marco Guida

18 April 2021 31	Bologna	4–1	Spezia	Bologna
15:00 CEST (UTC+2)	Orsolini 12' (pen.); Barrow 18'; Soumaoro (yellow card) 39'; Svanberg 54', 60'	Report	Ismajli 34'; Bastoni (yellow card) 36'	Stadium: Stadio Renato Dall'Ara; Attendance: 0 Referee: Marco Piccinini

21 April 2021 32	Bologna	1–1	Torino	Bologna
20:45 CEST (UTC+2)	Barrow 25'; Baldursson (yellow card) 28'; Poli (yellow card) 51'; Mbaye (yellow card) 53'; Danilo (yellow card) 81'	Report	Nkoulou (yellow card) 18'; Rincón (yellow card) 45+2'; Mandragora 58'	Stadium: Stadio Renato Dall'Ara; Attendance: 0 Referee: Valerio Marini

25 April 2021 33	Atalanta	5–0	Bologna	Bergamo
20:45 CEST (UTC+2)	Malinovskyi 22'; Muriel 44' (pen.); Freuler 57'; Zapata 59'; Miranchuk 73'	Report	Danilo (yellow card) 44'; Schouten (red card) 49'	Stadium: Gewiss Stadium; Attendance: 0 Referee: Michael Fabbri

2 May 2021 34	Bologna	3–3	Fiorentina	Bologna
15:00 CEST (UTC+2)	Soumaoro (yellow card) 20'; Palacio 31', 71', 84'; Svanberg (yellow card) 47'	Report	Vlahović 21' (pen.), 73'; Bonaventura 64'; Milenković (yellow card) 76'; Igor (yellow card) 79'	Stadium: Stadio Renato Dall'Ara; Attendance: 0 Referee: Federico Dionisi

8 May 2021 35	Udinese	1–1	Bologna	Udine
15:00 CEST (UTC+2)	De Paul 23'; Walace (yellow card) 66'	Report	Schouten (yellow card) 30'; Orsolini 82' (pen.)	Stadium: Stadio Friuli; Attendance: 0 Referee: Alberto Santoro

12 May 2021 36	Bologna	0–2	Genoa	Bologna
20:45 CEST (UTC+2)	Schouten (yellow card) 68'	Report	Zapata (yellow card) 1'; Zappacosta 13'; Shomurodov (yellow card) 46'; Scamacca 61' (pen.); Rovella (yellow card) 64'	Stadium: Stadio Renato Dall'Ara; Attendance: 0 Referee: Francesco Fourneau

17 May 2021 37	Hellas Verona	2–2	Bologna	Verona
20:45 CEST (UTC+2)	Faraoni 2'; Günter (yellow card) 41'; Barák (yellow card) 49'; Kalinić 53', (yellow card) 73'	Report	De Silvestri 32'; Dijks (yellow card) 52'; Schouten (yellow card) 56'; Soriano (yellow card) 69'; Palacio 82'	Stadium: Stadio Marcantonio Bentegodi; Attendance: 0 Referee: Matteo Marchetti

23 May 2021 38	Bologna	1–4	Juventus	Bologna
20:45 CEST (UTC+2)	Medel (yellow card) 44'; Orsolini 86'	Report	Chiesa 6'; Morata 29', 47', (yellow card) 37'; Rabiot 45'; McKennie (yellow card) 65'	Stadium: Stadio Renato Dall'Ara; Attendance: 0 Referee: Paolo Valeri

=== Coppa Italia ===
27 October 2020 Third round	Bologna	2–0	Reggina	Bologna
15:00 CET (UTC+1)	Sansone (yellow card) 57'; Vignato 70'; Michael (yellow card) 71'; Orsolini 72'	Report	Lafferty (yellow card) 16'; Stavropoulos (yellow card) 47'; De Rose (yellow card) 71'	Stadium: Stadio Renato Dall'Ara; Referee: Gianluca Manganiello

25 November 2020 Fourth round	Bologna	2–4 (a.e.t.)	Spezia	Bologna
17:30 CET (UTC+1)	Barrow 13'; Domínguez (yellow card) 44'; Orsolini 45+1'; Medel (yellow card) 50'; Soriano (yellow card) 104'; Sansone (yellow card) 116'	Report	Piccoli 5'; Marchizza (yellow card) 27'; Agudelo (yellow card) 58'; Chabot (yellow card) 62'; Farias 64'; Deiola (yellow card) 78'; Krapikas (yellow card) 89'; Maggiore 100', 119', (yellow card) 114'; Mattiello (yellow card) 114'	Stadium: Stadio Renato Dall'Ara; Referee: Manuel Volpi

== Statistics ==
=== Appearances and goals ===
No.	Pos	Nat	Player	Total		Serie A		Coppa Italia	
No.	Pos	Nat	Player	Apps	Goals	Apps	Goals	Apps	Goals
Goalkeepers
1	GK	(Brazil) BRA	Angelo da Costa	8	0	6	0	2	0
28	GK	(Poland) POL	Łukasz Skorupski	28	0	28	0	0	0
34	GK	(Italy) ITA	Federico Ravaglia	4	0	4	0	0	0
Defenders
3	DF	(Scotland) SCO	Aaron Hickey	12	0	10+1	0	0+1	0
5	DF	(France) FRA	Adama Soumaoro	20	1	19+1	1	0	0
6	DF	(Italy) ITA	Wisdom Amey	1	0	0+1	0	0	0
14	DF	(Japan) JPN	Takehiro Tomiyasu	33	2	31	2	2	0
15	DF	(Senegal) SEN	Ibrahima Mbaye	9	1	5+3	1	1	0
17	DF	(Chile) CHI	Gary Medel	12	0	6+5	0	1	0
23	DF	(Brazil) BRA	Danilo	35	0	34+1	0	0	0
26	DF	(Bulgaria) BUL	Valentin Antov	5	0	2+3	0	0	0
29	DF	(Italy) ITA	Lorenzo De Silvestri	30	2	25+4	2	1	0
35	DF	(Netherlands) NED	Mitchell Dijks	20	0	18+2	0	0	0
43	DF	(Italy) ITA	Paolo Faragò	1	0	0+1	0	0	0
68	DF	(Morocco) MAR	Omar Khailoti	1	0	0+1	0	0	0
Midfielders
8	MF	(Argentina) ARG	Nicolás Domínguez	30	1	15+13	1	2	0
16	MF	(Italy) ITA	Andrea Poli	19	1	4+14	1	0+1	0
18	MF	(Iceland) ISL	Andri Fannar Baldursson	9	0	1+7	0	1	0
21	MF	(Italy) ITA	Roberto Soriano	39	9	37	9	1+1	0
30	MF	(Netherlands) NED	Jerdy Schouten	35	1	28+6	1	0+1	0
32	MF	(Sweden) SWE	Mattias Svanberg	35	5	24+10	5	1	0
70	MF	(Italy) ITA	Dion Ruffo Luci	0	0	0	0	0	0
82	MF	(Poland) POL	Kacper Urbański	1	0	0+1	0	0	0
Forwards
7	FW	(Italy) ITA	Riccardo Orsolini	36	9	21+13	7	1+1	2
9	FW	(Paraguay) PAR	Federico Santander	5	0	0+4	0	1	0
10	FW	(Italy) ITA	Nicola Sansone	28	2	11+15	2	1+1	0
11	FW	(Denmark) DEN	Andreas Skov Olsen	26	2	12+14	2	0	0
19	FW	(Italy) ITA	Simone Rabbi	5	0	0+4	0	0+1	0
24	FW	(Argentina) ARG	Rodrigo Palacio	37	5	28+8	5	0+1	0
44	FW	(Italy) ITA	Mattia Pagliuca	1	0	0+1	0	0	0
55	FW	(Italy) ITA	Emanuel Vignato	33	2	11+20	1	2	1
63	FW	(Italy) ITA	Edoardo Vergani	1	0	0+1	0	0	0
76	FW	(Italy) ITA	Antonio Raimondo	1	0	0+1	0	0	0
80	FW	(The Gambia) GAM	Musa Juwara	5	0	0+5	0	0	0
99	FW	(The Gambia) GAM	Musa Barrow	40	9	34+4	8	1+1	1
Players transferred out during the season
4	DF	(Netherlands) NED	Stefano Denswil	7	0	1+4	0	2	0
6	DF	(Argentina) ARG	Nehuén Paz	7	1	3+3	1	1	0
20	GK	(Canada) CAN	Sebastian Breza	0	0	0	0	0	0
22	MF	(Nigeria) NGR	Kingsley Michael	1	0	0	0	1	0
33	DF	(Italy) ITA	Arturo Calabresi	2	0	0+1	0	0+1	0

Last updated: 23 May 2021
Source: Competitions

=== Goalscorers ===
As of 12 February 2021

Rank	No.	Pos	Nat	Name	Serie A	Coppa Italia	Total
1	7	FW	(Italy)	Riccardo Orsolini	4	2	6
1	21	MF	(Italy)	Roberto Soriano	6	0	6
1	99	FW	(The Gambia)	Musa Barrow	5	1	6
4	14	DF	(Japan)	Takehiro Tomiyasu	2	0	2
4	32	MF	(Sweden)	Mattias Svanberg	2	0	2
4	55	MF	(Italy)	Emanuel Vignato	1	1	2
7	6	DF	(Argentina)	Nehuén Paz	1	0	1
7	8	MF	(Argentina)	Nicolás Domínguez	1	0	1
7	10	FW	(Italy)	Nicola Sansone	1	0	1
7	11	FW	(Denmark)	Andreas Skov Olsen	1	0	1
7	16	MF	(Italy)	Andrea Poli	1	0	1
7	24	FW	(Argentina)	Rodrigo Palacio	1	0	1
7	29	DF	(Italy)	Lorenzo De Silvestri	1	0	1
Own goals					2	0	2
Totals					29	4	33
