= Marco Molla =

Albanian footballer (born 2002)

Personal information
- Full name: Marco Besnik Molla
- Date of birth: 19 June 2002 (age 24)
- Place of birth: Sesto Fiorentino, Italy
- Height: 1.92 m (6 ft 4 in)
- Position: Goalkeeper

Team information
- Current team: Besëlidhja Lezhë

Youth career
- –2014: Sesto
- 2014–2018: Prato
- 2018–2022: Bologna

Senior career*
Years	Team	Apps	(Gls)
2018	Prato	0	(0)
2020–2024	Bologna	0	(0)
2022–2023	→ Imolese (loan)	8	(0)
2024–2025	Laçi	14	(0)
2026–	Besëlidhja Lezhë	0	(0)

International career^{‡}
2018	Albania U16	2	(0)
2018	Albania U17	2	(0)
2018–2019	Italy U17	14	(0)
2019–2020	Italy U18	3	(0)
2020–2022	Albania U21	2	(0)
- * Club domestic league appearances and goals as of 1 July 2025 ‡ National team caps and goals as of 1 November 2022

Marco Molla (Albanian: Marko Molla, Albanian pronunciation: [ˈmarko ˈmɔla]; born 19 June 2002) is a professional footballer who plays as a goalkeeper for Albanian Kategoria e Dytë club Besëlidhja Lezhë.

Molla began his youth career with Prato before joining Bologna in 2018, later spending a season on loan with Imolese and a brief spell at Laçi in the Kategoria Superiore.

Originally part of Albania's youth setups, Molla represented Italy at under-17 and under-18 levels in a few matches before returning to play for Albania's under-21 national team. He has since been called up to the senior national team but has yet to make his full international debut.

== Club career ==
=== Early and youth career ===
Molla began playing football at local club Sesto, initially as a centre-back, before being converted into a goalkeeper on the advice of his youth coach, who recognised his physical and technical potential. At around the age of 12, he joined Prato, where he continued his development and impressed at youth level, notably reaching the under-17 national final. His performances attracted the attention of Bologna, which signed him in the summer of 2018. Molla quickly adapted to his new surroundings, joining the club's youth setup and living in the team's training residence, where he established himself as one of the most promising young goalkeepers in the academy.

=== Bologna ===
After progressing through Bologna's youth ranks, Molla was promoted to the senior team during the 2020–21 season. Although he did not make an official appearance in Serie A, he was regularly included in the first-team squad as a reserve goalkeeper. His consistent performances with the Primavera side earned him recognition as one of Bologna's most promising academy graduates.

=== Loan to Imolese ===
On 26 August 2022, Molla joined Serie C club Imolese on a season-long loan deal to gain first-team experience. He made several appearances across league and cup competitions, displaying good shot-stopping reflexes and aerial ability despite limited playing time.

=== Laçi ===
In July 2024, Molla signed with Laçi in the Kategoria Superiore, marking his first spell in Albanian football. He featured regularly during the first half of the 2024–25 season, before leaving the club in mid-2025 as a free agent.

== International career ==
Molla first represented Albania at youth level, featuring for the under-16 and under-17 national teams in 2018.

Later that year, after joining Bologna's academy and not receiving further call-ups from the Albanian Football Federation, Molla and his family expressed disappointment over the situation and opted for him to represent Italy at youth level instead. He went on to earn 14 caps with the Italy U17—appearing at both the UEFA European Under-17 Championship and the FIFA U-17 World Cup—and also made three appearances for the Italy U18.

In 2020, Molla returned to represent Albania, joining the under-21 national team, for which he made two appearances during the UEFA Euro 2021 qualification campaign. In October 2022, head coach Edoardo Reja included him for the first time in the senior national team squad ahead of a friendly against Armenia and the UEFA Nations League fixtures against Kazakhstan and Lithuania. He was an unused substitute in all matches and has yet to make his full international debut.

== Style of play ==
Standing at 1.92 metres, Molla is known for his imposing physical presence and calmness under pressure. A modern-style goalkeeper, he combines strong reflexes and good positional sense with confident ball-handling and composure in one-on-one situations. Initially starting his youth career as a central defender, he later transitioned to the goalkeeper role on his coach's advice, who recognized his technical qualities and physical attributes suitable for the position.

== Personal life ==
Molla was born in Sesto Fiorentino, near Florence, Italy, to Albanian parents from Shkodër, who had emigrated to Italy during the 1990s. He holds dual citizenship of Italy and Albania.

== Career statistics ==
=== Club ===
As of match played 12 April 2024

Appearances and goals by club, season and competition
Club	Season	League			Cup		Other		Total	
Club	Season	Division	Apps	Goals	Apps	Goals	Apps	Goals	Apps	Goals
Prato	2017–18	Serie C – Group A	0	0	—		—		0	0
Prato	Total		0	0	—		—		0	0
Bologna	2019–20	Serie A	0	0	—		—		0	0
Bologna	2020–21	Serie A	0	0	—		—		0	0
Bologna	2021–22	Serie A	0	0	—		—		0	0
Imolese (loan)	2022–23	Serie C – Group B	8	0	—		2 (Note: Appearances in Coppa Italia Serie C)	0	10	0
Bologna	2024–25	Serie A	0	0	—		—		0	0
Bologna	Total		8	0	—		2	0	10	0
Laçi	2024–25	Kategoria Superiore	14	0	3	0	—		17	0
Career total			22	0	3	0	2	0	27	0
