= 2019–20 Bologna FC 1909 season =

Bologna
2019–20 season
- President: Joey Saputo
- Manager: Siniša Mihajlović
- Stadium: Stadio Renato Dall'Ara
- Serie A: 12th
- Coppa Italia: Fourth round
- Top goalscorer: League: Musa Barrow; Rodrigo Palacio (9 each); All: Rodrigo Palacio (11)
Home colours	Away colours	Third colours

The 2019–20 season was the 110th season in existence of Bologna and the fifth consecutive season in Serie A and 73rd in total. Having finished 10th the previous season, Bologna competed solely in domestic competitions, in Serie A and the Coppa Italia.

The season was coach Siniša Mihajlović's first full campaign in charge of the club, after having replaced Filippo Inzaghi in January 2019. However, Mihajlović held a press conference on 13 July, following reports of a serious illness, in which he announced that he was battling leukemia. Immediately following the announcement, the club insisted that Mihajlović would remain coach and could continue working so long as he felt able to do so.

== Players ==
=== Squad information ===
As of 7 February 2020

No.	Name	Nat	Position(s)	Date of birth (age)	Signed from	Signed in	Contract ends	Apps.	Goals	Notes
Goalkeepers
1	Angelo da Costa	(Brazil)	GK	12 November 1983 (age 42)	(Italy) Sampdoria	2015	2020	36	0	
12	Marco Molla	(Italy)	GK	19 June 2002 (age 23)	(Italy) Youth Sector	2019	-	0	0	
28	Łukasz Skorupski	(Poland)	GK	5 May 1991 (age 35)	(Italy) Roma	2018	2023	61	0	
97	Mouhamadou Sarr	(Senegal)	GK	5 January 1997 (age 29)	(Italy) Youth Sector	2016	2020	0	0	
Defenders
4	Stefano Denswil	(Netherlands)	CB / LB	7 May 1993 (age 33)	(Belgium) Club Brugge	2019	2022	15	0	
13	Mattia Bani	(Italy)	CB	10 December 1993 (age 32)	(Italy) Chievo	2019	2023	19	4	
14	Takehiro Tomiyasu	(Japan)	CB / RB	5 November 1998 (age 27)	(Belgium) Sint-Truiden	2019	2024	17	0	
15	Ibrahima Mbaye	(Senegal)	RB / LB	14 October 1994 (age 31)	(Italy) Internazionale	2015	2023	99	4	
23	Danilo	(Brazil)	CB	10 May 1984 (age 42)	(Italy) Udinese	2018	2020	51	2	
33	Arturo Calabresi	(Italy)	RB / CB	17 March 1996 (age 30)	(Italy) Roma	2018	2022	18	1	
35	Mitchell Dijks	(Netherlands)	LB	9 February 1993 (age 33)	(Netherlands) Ajax	2018	2023	29	1	
Midfielders
5	Gary Medel	(Chile)	DM / CB	3 August 1987 (age 38)	(Turkey) Beşiktaş	2019	2022	13	0	
8	Nicolás Domínguez	(Argentina)	CM	28 June 1998 (age 27)	(Argentina) Vélez Sarsfield	2019	2024	3	0	
16	Andrea Poli	(Italy)	CM / DM	29 September 1989 (age 36)	(Italy) Milan	2017	2021	82	8	Captain
21	Roberto Soriano	(Italy)	CM / AM / LM	8 February 1991 (age 35)	(Spain) Villarreal	2019	2023	34	5	
30	Jerdy Schouten	(Netherlands)	DM / CM	12 January 1997 (age 29)	(Netherlands) Excelsior	2019	2024	11	0	
32	Mattias Svanberg	(Sweden)	CM	5 January 1999 (age 27)	(Sweden) Malmö FF	2018	2023	36	0	
Forwards
7	Riccardo Orsolini	(Italy)	RW	24 January 1997 (age 29)	(Italy) Juventus	2018	2022	66	15	
9	Federico Santander	(Paraguay)	ST	4 June 1991 (age 34)	(Denmark) Copenhagen	2018	2022	51	9	
10	Nicola Sansone	(Italy)	LW / SS	10 September 1991 (age 34)	(Spain) Villarreal	2019	2023	36	6	
11	Ladislav Krejčí	(Czech Republic)	LW	5 July 1992 (age 33)	(Czech Republic) Sparta Prague	2016	2020	77	2	
17	Andreas Skov Olsen	(Denmark)	RW / LW	29 December 1999 (age 26)	(Denmark) Nordsjælland	2019	2024	16	1	
24	Rodrigo Palacio	(Argentina)	ST / SS	5 February 1982 (age 44)	(Italy) Internazionale	2017	2020	78	11	
26	Musa Juwara	(The Gambia)	LW / SS / RW	26 December 2001 (age 24)	(Italy) Chievo	2019		1	0	
99	Musa Barrow	(The Gambia)	CF / LW	14 November 1998 (age 27)	(Italy) Atalanta	2019	2021	4	3	Loan
Players transferred during the season
6	Nehuén Paz	(Argentina)	CB	28 April 1993 (age 33)	(Argentina) Newell's Old Boys	2018	2021	5	0	
20	César Falletti	(Uruguay)	AM	2 December 1992 (age 33)	(Paraguay) Luqueño	2017	2021	13	1	
22	Mattia Destro	(Italy)	ST	20 March 1991 (age 35)	(Italy) Roma	2015	2020	105	29	Vice-captain
31	Blerim Džemaili	(Switzerland)	CM	12 April 1986 (age 40)	(Turkey) Galatasaray	2016	2020	88	11	Captain
91	Diego Falcinelli	(Italy)	ST	26 June 1991 (age 34)	(Italy) Sassuolo	2018	2022	16	0	
99	Caio Vinicius Pirana	(Brazil)	GK	8 May 1999 (age 27)	(Italy) Campodarsego	2018	2023	0	0	
99	Kingsley Michael	(Nigeria)	CM / DM / AM	5 January 1999 (age 27)	(Italy) Youth Sector	2018	2024	1	0	
—	Lorenzo Crisetig	(Italy)	DM / CM / AM	20 January 1993 (age 33)	(Italy) Internazionale	2016	2020	14	0	

== Transfers ==
=== In ===
Date	Pos.	Player	Age	Moving from	Fee	Notes	Ref
1 July 2019	DF	(Italy) Mattia Bani	25	(Italy) Chievo	€2.5M		
1 July 2019	DF	(Brazil) Danilo	35	(Italy) Udinese	Undisclosed	signed permanently after obligation to buy	
1 July 2019	MF	(Italy) Roberto Soriano	27	(Spain) Villarreal	€7.5M	signed permanently after obligation to buy	
1 July 2019	FW	(Italy) Nicola Sansone	27	(Spain) Villarreal	€7.5M	signed permanently after obligation to buy	
1 July 2019	FW	(Italy) Riccardo Orsolini	22	(Italy) Juventus	€15M	signed permanently after obligation to buy	
5 July 2019	MF	(Netherlands) Jerdy Schouten	22	(Netherlands) Excelsior	€6M		
6 July 2019	DF	(Netherlands) Stefano Denswil	26	(Belgium) Club Brugge	€6M		
9 July 2019	DF	(Japan) Takehiro Tomiyasu	20	(Belgium) Sint-Truiden	€9M		
24 July 2019	FW	(Denmark) Andreas Skov Olsen	19	(Denmark) Nordsjælland	€9M		
14 August 2019	GK	(Italy) Marco Molla	17	(Italy) Youth Sector	Free		

==== Loans in ====
Date	Pos.	Player	Age	Moving from	Fee	Notes	Ref

=== Out ===
Date	Pos.	Player	Age	Moving to	Fee	Notes	Ref
30 June 2019	MF	(Hungary) Ádám Nagy	24	(England) Bristol City	€2.5M	Signed permanently by option to buy	
30 June 2019	FW	(Uruguay) Felipe Avenatti	26	(Belgium) Standard Liège	€3.5M		
1 July 2019	DF	(Italy) Alex Ferrari	25	(Italy) Sampdoria	€4.5M	Signed permanently by option to buy	
1 July 2019	DF	(France) Sebastien De Maio	32	(Italy) Udinese	€1M	Signed permanently by option to buy	
1 July 2019	DF	(Sweden) Emil Krafth	24	(France) Amiens	€2M	Signed permanently by option to buy	
13 July 2019	DF	(Sweden) Filip Helander	26	(Scotland) Rangers	€3.9M		
14 July 2019	MF	(Italy) Giordano Trovade	21	(Italy) Südtirol	Free		
9 August 2019	MF	(Chile) Erick Pulgar	25	(Italy) Fiorentina	€10M		

==== Loans out ====
Date	Pos.	Player	Age	Moving to	Fee	Notes	Ref
30 June 2019	GK	(Dominican Republic) Antonio Santurro	27	(Italy) Sambenedettese	N/A	On loan until June 2020	
30 June 2019	GK	(Italy) Federico Ravaglia	19	(Italy) Gubbio	N/A	On loan until June 2020	
30 June 2019	DF	(Italy) Fabrizio Brignani	21	(Italy) Cesena	N/A	On loan until June 2020	
30 June 2019	DF	(Morocco) Hamza El Kaouakibi	21	(Italy) Piacenza	N/A	On loan until June 2020	
30 June 2019	MF	(Italy) Luca Rizzo	27	(Italy) Livorno	N/A	On loan until June 2020	
30 June 2019	MF	(Colombia) Juan Manuel Valencia	21	(Italy) Cesena	N/A	On loan until June 2020	
19 August 2019	MF	(Ghana) Godfred Donsah	23	(Belgium) Cerlce Brugge	N/A	On loan until June 2020	

== Pre-season and friendlies ==
26 July 2019 Friendly	1. FC Köln (Germany)	3–1	(Italy) Bologna	Kufstein, Austria
18:00 CEST (UTC+2)	Kainz 11', 22'; Churlinov 71'	Report	Orsolini 85'	Stadium: Kufstein-Arena; Referee: Patrick Elsler (Austria)

29 July 2019 Friendly	Schalke 04 (Germany)	2–3	(Italy) Bologna	Kitzbühel, Austria
18:00 CEST (UTC+2)	Reese 9'; Boujellab 87'	Report	Poli 36'; Sansone 44'; Palacio 59'	Stadium: Sportplatz Langau; Attendance: 1,521; Referee: Walter Altmann (Austria)

3 August 2019 Friendly	Augsburg (Germany)	2–3	(Italy) Bologna	Augsburg, Germany
15:30 CEST (UTC+2)	Gregoritsch 25' (pen.); Richter 50'	Report	Destro 6'; Svanberg 74'; Khedira 85' (o.g.)	Stadium: Augsburg Arena; Referee: Tobias Schultes (Germany)

10 August 2019 Friendly	Bologna (Italy)	3–4	(Spain) Villarreal	Serravalle, San Marino
20:45 CEST (UTC+2)	Denswil (yellow card) 19'; Palacio 24'; Santander 75'; Tomiyasu 82'	Report	Gómez 5'; Cazorla 63'; Chukwueze 66'; Albiol (yellow card) 81'; Gerard 85'	Stadium: San Marino Stadium; Referee: Luca Barbeno (San Marino)

12 October 2019 Friendly	Bologna (Italy)	2–2	(Slovenia) Olimpija Ljubljana	Casteldebole, Italy
11:00 CEST (UTC+2)	Palacio 5'; Poli 80'	Report	Lupeta 68'; Çekiçi 89'	Stadium: Centro tecnico Niccolò Galli; Referee: Antonio Rapuano (Italy)

== Competitions ==
=== Serie A ===
==== League table ====
Pos	Team	Pld	W	D	L	GF	GA	GD	Pts
10	Fiorentina	38	12	13	13	51	48	+3	49 (Note: Positions determined by head-to-head points: Hellas Verona: 10 pts; Fiorentina: 5 pts; Parma: 1 pt.)
11	Parma	38	14	7	17	56	57	−1	49
12	Bologna	38	12	11	15	52	65	−13	47
13	Udinese	38	12	9	17	37	51	−14	45 (Note: Udinese finished ahead of Cagliari on head-to-head points: Udinese 2–1 Cagliari, Cagliari 0–1 Udinese.)
14	Cagliari	38	11	12	15	52	56	−4	45

Source: Serie A, Soccerway
Rules for classification: 1) Points; 2) Head-to-head points; 3) Head-to-head goal difference; 4) Goal difference; 5) Goals scored; 6) Draw. (Note: Head-to-head record is used only after all the matches between the teams in question have been played)

==== Results summary ====
Overall								Home						Away					
Pld	W	D	L	GF	GA	GD	Pts	W	D	L	GF	GA	GD	W	D	L	GF	GA	GD
38	12	11	15	52	65	−13	47	5	8	6	25	29	−4	7	3	9	27	36	−9

Last updated: 2 August 2020.
Source: Competitive matches

==== Results by round ====
Round	1	2	3	4	5	6	7	8	9	10	11	12	13	14	15	16	17	18	19	20	21	22	23	24	25	26	27	28	29	30	31	32	33	34	35	36	37	38
Ground	A	H	A	H	A	A	H	A	H	A	H	A	H	A	H	H	A	H	A	H	A	H	A	H	H	A	H	A	H	A	H	A	H	A	A	H	A	H
Result	D	W	W	L	D	L	D	L	W	L	L	L	D	W	L	W	W	D	L	D	W	W	W	L	D	L	L	W	D	W	L	D	D	L	L	W	L	D
Position	11	6	2	5	8	13	11	13	10	11	13	15	15	12	13	13	9	10	13	12	11	11	7	10	10	10	11	11	12	9	10	10	10	10	12	10	12	12

Updated to match(es) played on 2 August 2020. Source: Competitive matches
A = Away; H = Home; W = Win; D = Draw; L = Loss

==== Matches ====
25 August 2019 1	Hellas Verona	1–1	Bologna	Verona
20:45 CEST (UTC+02:00)	Dawidowicz (red card) 13'; Henderson (yellow card) 18'; Veloso 37'	Report	Sansone 15' (pen.); Denswil (yellow card) 65'; Destro (yellow card) 80'; Dijks (yellow card) 88'	Stadium: Stadio Marc'Antonio Bentegodi; Attendance: 16,324; Referee: Antonio Giua

30 August 2019 2	Bologna	1–0	SPAL	Bologna
20:45 CEST (UTC+02:00)	Danilo (yellow card) 39'; Medel (yellow card) 60'; Santander (yellow card) 90'; Soriano 90+3'	Report	Missiroli (yellow card) 50'; Igor (yellow card) 61'	Stadium: Stadio Renato Dall'Ara; Attendance: 25,086; Referee: Marco Di Bello

15 September 2019 3	Brescia	3–4	Bologna	Brescia
15:00 CEST (UTC+02:00)	Donnarumma 10', 19'; Dessena (yellow card) 21' (yellow-red card) 48'; Cistana 42'	Report	Bani (yellow card) 12', (goal) 36'; Denswil (yellow card) 45+2'; Palacio 56'; Sabelli 60' (o.g.); Santander (yellow card) 67'; Soriano (yellow card) 69'; Orsolini 80'; Medel (yellow card) 83'; Olsen (yellow card) 90+3'	Stadium: Stadio Mario Rigamonti; Attendance: 15,000; Referee: Gianluca Rocchi

22 September 2019 4	Bologna	1–2	Roma	Bologna
15:00 CEST (UTC+02:00)	Poli (yellow card) 15'; Dijks (yellow card) 41'; Sansone 54' (pen.); Tomiyasu (yellow card) 56'	Report	Florenzi (yellow card) 13'; Kolarov 49'; Zaniolo (yellow card) 59'; Džeko (yellow card) 62', (goal) 90+4'; Veretout (yellow card) 64'; Mancini (yellow card) 71' (yellow-red card) 85'	Stadium: Stadio Renato Dall'Ara; Attendance: 25,513; Referee: Luca Pairetto

25 September 2019 5	Genoa	0–0	Bologna	Genoa
21:00 CEST (UTC+02:00)	Lerager (yellow card) 28'; Zapata (yellow card) 42'; Ghiglione (yellow card) 68'; Romero (yellow card) 73'; Radovanović (yellow card) 79'	Report	Tomiyasu (yellow card) 2'; Denswil (yellow card) 46'; Poli (yellow card) 79'; Olsen (yellow card) 90+2'	Stadium: Stadio Luigi Ferraris; Attendance: 20,497; Referee: Davide Massa

29 September 2019 6	Udinese	1–0	Bologna	Udine
15:00 CEST (UTC+02:00)	Samir (yellow card) 16'; Okaka 27', (yellow card) 41'; Troost-Ekong (yellow card) 77'; Nestorovski (yellow card) 85'	Report	Soriano (yellow card) 55' (red card) 90+6'; Bani (yellow card) 75'; Skorupski (yellow card) 85'	Stadium: Dacia Arena; Attendance: 21,361; Referee: Antonio Giua

6 October 2019 7	Bologna	2–2	Lazio	Bologna
15:00 CEST (UTC+02:00)	Krejčí 21', (yellow card) 27'; Palacio 31', (yellow card) 89'; Sansone (yellow card) 63'; Danilo (yellow card) 64'; Medel (red card) 70'; Bani (yellow card) 75'	Report	Luiz Felipe (yellow card) 20'; Immobile 23', 39'; Lucas (yellow card) 51' (yellow-red card) 60'; Lulić (yellow card) 79'	Stadium: Stadio Renato Dall'Ara; Attendance: 22,052; Referee: Daniele Orsato

19 October 2019 8	Juventus	2–1	Bologna	Turin
20:45 CEST (UTC+02:00)	Ronaldo 19'; Rabiot (yellow card) 30'; Pjanić 54'; Bentancur (yellow card) 70'	Report	Sansone (yellow card) 22'; Danilo 26', (yellow card) 84'; Krejčí (yellow card) 90+5'	Stadium: Allianz Stadium; Attendance: 40,461; Referee: Massimiliano Irrati

27 October 2019 9	Bologna	2–1	Sampdoria	Bologna
12:30 CET (UTC+01:00)	Palacio 48'; Bani 78'; Schouten (yellow card) 83'	Report	Gabbiadini 64'; Bereszyński (yellow card) 73'; Murru (yellow card) 77'; Colley (yellow card) 87'	Stadium: Stadio Renato Dall'Ara; Attendance: 24,099; Referee: Daniele Doveri

30 October 2019 10	Cagliari	3–2	Bologna	Cagliari
21:00 CET (UTC+01:00)	Cigarini (yellow card) 19'; João Pedro 48', 83'; Simeone 72'; Pellegrini (yellow card) 90'	Report	Santander 23' (pen.); Orsolini (yellow card) 26'; Faragò 90+1' (o.g.)	Stadium: Sardegna Arena; Attendance: 16,076; Referee: Juan Luca Sacchi

2 November 2019 11	Bologna	1–2	Internazionale	Bologna
18:00 CET (UTC+01:00)	Danilo (yellow card) 42'; Soriano 59'; Bani (yellow card) 81'; Medel (yellow card) 90+4'	Report	Brozović (yellow card) 35'; Gagliardini (yellow card) 73'; Lukaku 75', 90+2' (pen.); Škriniar (yellow card) 77'; Vecino (yellow card) 86'	Stadium: Stadio Renato Dall'Ara; Attendance: 28,498; Referee: Federico La Penna

8 November 2019 12	Sassuolo	3–1	Bologna	Reggio Emilia
20:45 CET (UTC+01:00)	Caputo 34', 75'; Marlon (yellow card) 58'; Boga 68'; Magnanelli (yellow card) 87'	Report	Medel (yellow card) 50'; Danilo (yellow card) 53'; Bani (yellow card) 57'; Džemaili (yellow card) 65'; Orsolini 70'; Svanberg (yellow card) 88'; Mbaye (yellow card) 90'	Stadium: Mapei Stadium – Città del Tricolore; Attendance: 13,184; Referee: Marco Piccinini

24 November 2019 13	Bologna	2–2	Parma	Bologna
12:30 CET (UTC+01:00)	Tomiyasu (yellow card) 38'; Palacio 40'; Džemaili 90+5'	Report	Kulusevski 17'; Gagliolo (yellow card) 38'; Barillà (yellow card) 56'; Iacoponi 71'; Grassi (yellow card) 75'	Stadium: Stadio Renato Dall'Ara; Attendance: 21,419; Referee: Rosario Abisso

1 December 2019 14	Napoli	1–2	Bologna	Naples
18:00 CET (UTC+01:00)	Koulibaly (yellow card) 37'; Llorente 41'	Report	Medel (yellow card) 36'; Poli (yellow card) 56'; Olsen 58'; Denswil (yellow card) 61'; Sansone 80'; Destro (yellow card) 90+3'; Džemaili (yellow card) 90+5'	Stadium: Stadio San Paolo; Attendance: 27,083; Referee: Fabrizio Pasqua

8 December 2019 15	Bologna	2–3	Milan	Bologna
20:45 CET (UTC+01:00)	Bani (yellow card) 14'; Hernandez 40' (o.g.); Tomiyasu (yellow card) 74'; Palacio (yellow card) 77'; Santander (yellow card) 81'; Sansone 84' (pen.)	Report	Piątek 15' (pen.); Bennacer (yellow card) 21'; Hernandez 32'; Bonaventura 46'; Romagnoli (yellow card) 83'	Stadium: Stadio Renato Dall'Ara; Attendance: 23,707; Referee: Daniele Chiffi

15 December 2019 16	Bologna	2–1	Atalanta	Bologna
15:00 CET (UTC+01:00)	Palacio 12', (yellow card) 76'; Poli 53'; Orsolini (yellow card) 62'; Sansone (yellow card) 71'; Danilo (yellow card) 86' (yellow-red card) 88'	Report	Pašalić (yellow card) 32'; Malinovskyi 60'	Stadium: Stadio Renato Dall'Ara; Attendance: 21,277; Referee: Davide Massa

22 December 2019 17	Lecce	2–3	Bologna	Lecce
15:00 CET (UTC+01:00)	Tachtsidis (yellow card) 41'; Babacar (yellow card) 53', (goal) 85'; Calderoni (yellow card) 89'; Farias 90+1'	Report	Medel (yellow card) 41'; Orsolini 43', 66'; Mbaye (yellow card) 44'; Soriano 56'; Schouten (yellow card) 82'	Stadium: Stadio Via del Mare; Attendance: 18,763; Referee: Rosario Abisso

6 January 2020 18	Bologna	1–1	Fiorentina	Bologna
12:30 CET (UTC+01:00)	Medel (yellow card) 40'; Bani (yellow card) 77'; Orsolini 90+4'	Report	Benassi 27'; Milenković (yellow card) 38'; Lirola (yellow card) 45+1'; Cáceres (yellow card) 54'; Pulgar (yellow card) 69'	Stadium: Stadio Renato Dall'Ara; Attendance: 22,653; Referee: Paolo Valeri

12 January 2020 19	Torino	1–0	Bologna	Turin
15:00 CET (UTC+01:00)	De Silvestri (yellow card) 4'; Berenguer 11'; Lukić (yellow card) 20'; Sirigu (yellow card) 59'; Nkoulou (yellow card) 83'; Laxalt (yellow card) 88'	Report	Bani (yellow card) 15'; Santander (yellow card) 83'; Sansone (yellow card) 90+5'	Stadium: Stadio Olimpico Grande Torino; Attendance: 18,127; Referee: Marco Piccinini

19 January 2020 20	Bologna	1–1	Hellas Verona	Bologna
15:00 CET (UTC+01:00)	Bani 21', (yellow card) 35' (yellow-red card) 67'; Sansone (yellow card) 27'; Schouten (yellow card) 55'; Mbaye (yellow card) 76'; Poli (yellow card) 90'	Report	Amrabat (yellow card) 15'; Zaccagni (yellow card) 25'; Borini 81'	Stadium: Stadio Renato Dall'Ara; Attendance: 20,697; Referee: Giovanni Ayroldi

25 January 2020 21	SPAL	1–3	Bologna	Ferrara
15:00 CET (UTC+01:00)	Cionek (yellow card) 11'; Valoti (yellow card) 14'; Petagna 23' (pen.), (yellow card) 35'; Berisha (yellow card) 28'	Report	Paz (yellow card) 22'; Vicari 24' (o.g.); Barrow 59'; Poli 63'; Orsolini (yellow card) 68'; Tomiyasu (yellow card) 89'	Stadium: Stadio Paolo Mazza; Attendance: 12,622; Referee: Michael Fabbri

1 February 2020 22	Bologna	2–1	Brescia	Bologna
15:00 CET (UTC+01:00)	Mbaye (yellow card) 35'; Orsolini 43'; Danilo (yellow card) 45'; Poli (yellow card) 46'; Bani 89'	Report	Torregrossa 36' (pen.), (yellow card) 41'; Rômulo (yellow card) 45'	Stadium: Stadio Renato Dall'Ara; Attendance: 21,665; Referee: Daniele Doveri

7 February 2020 23	Roma	2–3	Bologna	Rome
20:45 CET (UTC+01:00)	Denswil 22' (o.g.); Santon (yellow card) 59'; Mkhitaryan 72'; Cristante (red card) 80'; Peres (yellow card) 85'	Report	Orsolini 16'; Barrow 26', 51'; Svanberg (yellow card) 38'; Schouten (yellow card) 55'; Bani (yellow card) 59'; Skorupski (yellow card) 88'	Stadium: Stadio Olimpico; Attendance: 31,808; Referee: Marco Guida

15 February 2020 24	Bologna	0–3	Genoa	Bologna
18:00 CET (UTC+01:00)	Schouten (red card) 34'; Denswil (yellow card) 65' (yellow-red card) 89'; Domínguez (yellow card) 81'	Report	Soumaoro 28', (yellow card) 81'; Ankersen (yellow card) 40'; Sanabria 44'; Goldaniga (yellow card) 53'; Sturaro (yellow card) 57'; Cassata (yellow card) 85'; Criscito 90' (pen.)	Stadium: Stadio Renato Dall'Ara; Attendance: 21,513; Referee: Davide Massa

22 February 2020 25	Bologna	1–1	Udinese	Bologna
15:00 CET (UTC+01:00)	Mbaye (yellow card) 51'; Palacio 90+1'	Report	Okaka 33', (yellow card) 84'; De Paul (yellow card) 51'	Stadium: Stadio Renato Dall'Ara; Attendance: 21,523; Referee: Fabrizio Pasqua

29 February 2020 26	Lazio	2–0	Bologna	Rome
15:00 CET (UTC+01:00)	Luis Alberto 18'; Correa 21'; Radu (yellow card) 83'	Report	Bani (yellow card) 4'; Schouten (yellow card) 11'; Danilo (yellow card) 54'; Santander (yellow card) 64'	Stadium: Stadio Olimpico; Attendance: 45,000; Referee: Rosario Abisso

22 June 2020 27	Bologna	0–2	Juventus	Bologna
21:45 CEST (UTC+02:00)	Soriano (yellow card) 35'	Report	Ronaldo 23' (pen.); Dybala 36'; De Sciglio (yellow card) 66'; Bentancur (yellow card) 69'; Danilo (yellow card) 82' (yellow-red card) 90+1'	Stadium: Stadio Renato Dall'Ara; Attendance: 0 Referee: Gianluca Rocchi
Note: Match was postponed to 13 March and then 22 June from its original date of 8 March due to schedule shuffling to allow for previous postponements to be played due to concerns over the COVID-19 pandemic. All subsequent matches were also shuffled to allow for this accommodation. However, on 9 March, all sports events in Italy were suspended until 3 April. This was the first match played since the COVID-19 pandemic lockdown in Italy.

28 June 2020 28	Sampdoria	1–2	Bologna	Genoa
19:30 CEST (UTC+02:00)	Ekdal (yellow card) 57'; Tonelli (yellow card) 66'; Bonazzoli 88'; Yoshida (yellow card) 90+4'	Report	Medel (yellow card) 58'; Barrow 72' (pen.); Orsolini 75'	Stadium: Stadio Luigi Ferraris; Attendance: 0 Referee: Daniele Doveri

1 July 2020 29	Bologna	1–1	Cagliari	Bologna
19:30 CEST (UTC+02:00)	Schouten (yellow card) 15'; Tomiyasu (yellow card) 19'; Barrow 45+3'; Dijks (yellow card) 64'	Report	Carboni (yellow card) 25'; Simeone 46'; Pellegrini (yellow card) 59'	Stadium: Stadio Renato Dall'Ara; Attendance: 0 Referee: Juan Luca Sacchi

5 July 2020 30	Internazionale	1–2	Bologna	Milan
17:15 CEST (UTC+02:00)	Lukaku 22'; Bastoni (yellow card) 41' (yellow-red card) 77'; D'Ambrosio (yellow card) 90+1'	Report	Danilo (yellow card) 15'; Soriano (red card) 57'; Juwara 74', (yellow card) 79'; Palacio (yellow card) 78'; Barrow 80'	Stadium: San Siro; Attendance: 0 Referee: Luca Pairetto

8 July 2020 31	Bologna	1–2	Sassuolo	Bologna
21:45 CEST (UTC+02:00)	Medel (yellow card) 26'; Denswil (yellow card) 60'; Dijks (yellow card) 82'; Barrow 90+1'	Report	Haraslín (yellow card) 34', (goal) 57'; Berardi 41'; Bourabia (yellow card) 87'; Müldür (yellow card) 90+1'; Rogério (yellow card) 90+4'	Stadium: Stadio Renato Dall'Ara; Attendance: 0 Referee: Francesco Fourneau

12 July 2020 32	Parma	2–2	Bologna	Parma
19:30 CEST (UTC+02:00)	Alves (yellow card) 30'; Kurtić 90+3'; Inglese 90+5'	Report	Danilo 3'; Soriano 16'; Barrow (yellow card) 75'	Stadium: Stadio Ennio Tardini; Attendance: 0 Referee: Maurizio Mariani

15 July 2020 33	Bologna	1–1	Napoli	Bologna
19:30 CEST (UTC+02:00)	Tomiyasu (yellow card) 46'; Barrow 80'	Report	Manolas 7'; Di Lorenzo (yellow card) 90'	Stadium: Stadio Renato Dall'Ara; Attendance: 0 Referee: Marco Piccinini

18 July 2020 34	Milan	5–1	Bologna	Milan
21:45 CEST (UTC+02:00)	Saelemaekers 10', (yellow card) 54'; Çalhanoğlu 24'; Bennacer 49'; Kjær (yellow card) 51'; Rebić 57'; Calabria 90+2'	Report	Sansone (yellow card) 35'; Tomiyasu 44'	Stadium: San Siro; Attendance: 0 Referee: Davide Massa

21 July 2020 35	Atalanta	1–0	Bologna	Bergamo
19:30 CEST (UTC+02:00)	Muriel 63'; Freuler (yellow card) 70'; Gosens (yellow card) 83'; Colley (yellow card) 90+3'; De Roon (yellow card) 90+4'	Report	Tomiyasu (yellow card) 30'; Danilo (yellow card) 76'	Stadium: Gewiss Stadium; Attendance: 0 Referee: Federico La Penna

26 July 2020 36	Bologna	3–2	Lecce	Bologna
17:15 CEST (UTC+02:00)	Palacio 2', (yellow card) 43'; Soriano 5'; Barrow 90+3'	Report	Mancosu 45+2'; Falco 66'; Rispoli (yellow card) 90+7'	Stadium: Stadio Renato Dall'Ara; Attendance: 0 Referee: Gianpaolo Calvarese

29 July 2020 37	Fiorentina	4–0	Bologna	Florence
21:45 CEST (UTC+02:00)	Ghezzal (yellow card) 29'; Chiesa 48', 54', 89'; Milenković 74'; Dalbert (yellow card) 81'	Report	Corbo (yellow card) 80'	Stadium: Stadio Artemio Franchi; Attendance: 0 Referee: Marco Di Bello

2 August 2020 38	Bologna	1–1	Torino	Bologna
20:45 CEST (UTC+02:00)	Svanberg 18'; Santander (yellow card) 76'; Soriano (yellow card) 80'; Medel (yellow card) 85'	Report	Ansaldi (yellow card) 45+2'; Rincón (yellow card) 56'; Berenguer (yellow card) 60'; Zaza 66'	Stadium: Stadio Renato Dall'Ara; Attendance: 0 Referee: Antonio Di Martino

=== Coppa Italia ===
18 August 2019 Third round	Pisa	0–3	Bologna	Pisa
20:45 CEST (UTC+02:00)	Marin (yellow card) 16'; Siega (yellow card) 19'; Meroni (yellow card) 57'	Report	Poli 21', (yellow card) 72'; Michael (yellow card) 33'; Orsolini 61'; Palacio 64'	Stadium: Arena Garibaldi; Attendance: 7,141; Referee: Federico La Penna

4 December 2019 Fourth round	Udinese	4–0	Bologna	Udine
21:00 CET (UTC+01:00)	Barák 24'; De Maio 42', (yellow card) 53'; Sierralta (yellow card) 45'; Mandragora 77'; Lasagna 90+2'; Stryger Larsen (yellow card) 90+3'	Report	Corbo (yellow card) 41'; Schouten (yellow card) 66'; Da Costa (yellow card) 90+2'; Juwara (yellow card) 90+3'	Stadium: Dacia Arena; Attendance: 3,066; Referee: Marco Piccinini

== Statistics ==
=== Appearances and goals ===
No.	Pos	Nat	Player	Total		Serie A		Coppa Italia	
No.	Pos	Nat	Player	Apps	Goals	Apps	Goals	Apps	Goals
Goalkeepers
1	GK	(Brazil) BRA	Angelo da Costa	2	0	1	0	1	0
28	GK	(Poland) POL	Łukasz Skorupski	38	0	37	0	1	0
97	GK	(Senegal) SEN	Mouhamadou Sarr	0	0	0	0	0	0
Defenders
4	DF	(Netherlands) NED	Stefano Denswil	28	1	25+1	1	2	0
6	DF	(Italy) ITA	Federico Bonini	1	0	0+1	0	0	0
13	DF	(Italy) ITA	Mattia Bani	27	4	26+1	4	0	0
14	DF	(Japan) JPN	Takehiro Tomiyasu	30	1	29	1	1	0
15	DF	(Senegal) SEN	Ibrahima Mbaye	21	0	16+4	0	1	0
23	DF	(Brazil) BRA	Danilo	31	2	30	2	1	0
25	DF	(Italy) ITA	Gabriele Corbo	3	0	1+1	0	1	0
35	DF	(Netherlands) NED	Mitchell Dijks	14	0	12+1	0	1	0
Midfielders
5	MF	(Chile) CHI	Gary Medel	24	0	22+1	0	1	0
8	MF	(Argentina) ARG	Nicolás Domínguez	16	0	7+9	0	0	0
16	MF	(Italy) ITA	Andrea Poli	30	3	22+6	2	2	1
21	MF	(Italy) ITA	Roberto Soriano	30	5	29	5	1	0
30	MF	(Netherlands) NED	Jerdy Schouten	20	0	13+6	0	0+1	0
32	MF	(Sweden) SWE	Mattias Svanberg	27	1	12+13	1	1+1	0
34	MF	(Iceland) ISL	Andri Fannar Baldursson	7	0	0+7	0	0	0
70	MF	(Italy) ITA	Dion Ruffo Luci	1	0	0+1	0	0	0
Forwards
7	FW	(Italy) ITA	Riccardo Orsolini	39	8	32+5	8	2	0
9	FW	(Paraguay) PAR	Federico Santander	25	1	5+19	1	0+1	0
10	FW	(Italy) ITA	Nicola Sansone	34	4	26+7	4	0+1	0
11	FW	(Czech Republic) CZE	Ladislav Krejčí	15	1	11+3	1	1	0
17	FW	(Denmark) DEN	Andreas Skov Olsen	26	1	7+19	1	0	0
24	FW	(Argentina) ARG	Rodrigo Palacio	36	9	28+7	7	1	2
26	FW	(The Gambia) GAM	Musa Juwara	8	1	1+6	1	1	0
29	FW	(Italy) ITA	Gianmarco Cangiano	3	0	0+3	0	0	0
99	FW	(The Gambia) GAM	Musa Barrow	18	9	14+4	9	0	0
Players transferred out during the season
6	DF	(Argentina) ARG	Nehuén Paz	4	0	1+2	0	1	0
22	FW	(Italy) ITA	Mattia Destro	7	0	2+3	0	1+1	0
31	MF	(Switzerland) SUI	Blerim Džemaili	14	1	8+6	1	0	0
99	MF	(Nigeria) NGA	Kingsley Michael	2	0	1	0	1	0

Last updated: 2 August 2020
Source: Competitions

=== Goalscorers ===
Rank	No.	Pos	Nat	Name	Serie A	Coppa Italia	Total
1	7	FW	(Italy)	Riccardo Orsolini	7	0	7
1	24	FW	(Argentina)	Rodrigo Palacio	5	2	7
3	10	FW	(Italy)	Nicola Sansone	4	0	4
3	13	DF	(Italy)	Mattia Bani	4	0	4
5	16	MF	(Italy)	Andrea Poli	2	1	3
5	21	MF	(Italy)	Roberto Soriano	3	0	3
5	99	FW	(The Gambia)	Musa Barrow	3	0	3
8	9	FW	(Paraguay)	Federico Santander	1	0	1
8	11	FW	(Czech Republic)	Ladislav Krejčí	1	0	1
8	17	FW	(Denmark)	Andreas Skov Olsen	1	0	1
8	23	DF	(Brazil)	Danilo	1	0	1
8	31	MF	(Switzerland)	Blerim Džemaili	1	0	1
Own goal					4	0	4
Totals					37	3	40

Last updated: 7 February 2020

=== Clean sheets ===
Rank	No.	Pos	Nat	Name	Serie A	Coppa Italia	Total
1	28	GK	(Poland)	Łukasz Skorupski	2	1	3
Totals					2	1	3

Last updated: 7 February 2020

=== Disciplinary record ===
No.	Pos	Nat	Name	Serie A			Coppa Italia			Total		
No.	Pos	Nat	Name	Booked	(yellow card) (yellow-red card)	Sent off (straight red)	Booked	(yellow card) (yellow-red card)	Sent off (straight red)	Booked	(yellow card) (yellow-red card)	Sent off (straight red)
1	GK	(Brazil)	Angelo da Costa	0	0	0	1	0	0	1	0	0
28	GK	(Poland)	Łukasz Skorupski	2	0	0	0	0	0	2	0	0
4	DF	(Netherlands)	Stefano Denswil	4	0	0	0	0	0	4	0	0
6	DF	(Argentina)	Nehuén Paz	1	0	0	0	0	0	1	0	0
13	DF	(Italy)	Mattia Bani	9	1	0	0	0	0	9	1	0
14	DF	(Japan)	Takehiro Tomiyasu	5	0	0	0	0	0	5	0	0
15	DF	(Senegal)	Ibrahima Mbaye	4	0	0	0	0	0	4	0	0
23	DF	(Brazil)	Danilo	6	1	0	0	0	0	6	1	0
25	DF	(Italy)	Gabriele Corbo	0	0	0	1	0	0	1	0	0
35	DF	(Netherlands)	Mitchell Dijks	2	0	0	0	0	0	2	0	0
5	MF	(Chile)	Gary Medel	7	0	1	0	0	0	7	0	1
16	MF	(Italy)	Andrea Poli	5	0	0	1	0	0	6	0	0
21	MF	(Italy)	Roberto Soriano	2	0	1	0	0	0	2	0	1
30	MF	(Netherlands)	Jerdy Schouten	4	0	0	1	0	0	5	0	0
31	MF	(Switzerland)	Blerim Džemaili	2	0	0	0	0	0	2	0	0
32	MF	(Sweden)	Mattias Svanberg	2	0	0	0	0	0	2	0	0
99	MF	(Nigeria)	Kingsley Michael	0	0	0	1	0	0	1	0	0
7	FW	(Italy)	Riccardo Orsolini	3	0	0	0	0	0	3	0	0
9	FW	(Paraguay)	Federico Santander	4	0	0	0	0	0	4	0	0
10	FW	(Italy)	Nicola Sansone	5	0	0	0	0	0	5	0	0
11	FW	(Czech Republic)	Ladislav Krejčí	2	0	0	0	0	0	2	0	0
17	FW	(Denmark)	Andreas Skov Olsen	2	0	0	0	0	0	2	0	0
22	FW	(Italy)	Mattia Destro	2	0	0	0	0	0	2	0	0
24	FW	(Argentina)	Rodrigo Palacio	3	0	0	0	0	0	3	0	0
26	FW	(The Gambia)	Musa Juwara	0	0	0	1	0	0	1	0	0
99	FW	(The Gambia)	Musa Barrow	0	0	0	0	0	0	0	0	0
Totals				76	2	2	6	0	0	82	2	2

Last updated: 7 February 2020
