= Wisdom Amey =

Italian footballer (born 2005)

Personal information
- Date of birth: 11 August 2005 (age 21)
- Place of birth: Bassano del Grappa, Italy
- Height: 1.87 m (6 ft 2 in)
- Position: Centre-back

Team information
- Current team: Frosinone (on loan from Bologna)
- Number: 5

Youth career
- 2016–2018: Bassano Virtus
- 2018–2019: Vicenza Virtus
- 2019–2025: Bologna

Senior career*
Years	Team	Apps	(Gls)
2021–	Bologna	2	(0)
2025–2026	→ Pianese (loan)	23	(0)
2026–	→ Frosinone (loan)	0	(0)

International career^{‡}
2023–2024	Italy U19	7	(1)
2025	Italy U20	2	(0)
2026–	Italy U21	1	(0)
- * Club domestic league appearances and goals as of 23 August 2026 ‡ National team caps and goals as of 8 June 2026

Wisdom Amey (born 11 August 2005) is an Italian professional footballer who plays as a centre-back for Serie A club Frosinone, on loan from Bologna.

== Early life ==
Amey was born in Bassano del Grappa, Veneto, Italy to a Togolese father and a Nigerian mother.

== Club career ==
Amey is a youth product of Bassano Virtus and Vicenza Virtus, before moving to the youth academy of Bologna in 2019. He made his professional debut with Bologna in a 2–0 Serie A loss to Genoa on 12 May 2021, coming on as a late substitute in the 89th minute. At the age of 15 years and 274 days, Amey became the youngest debutant in Serie A history, a record then beaten by Francesco Camarda in 2023.

On 15 July 2025, Amey joined Pianese in Serie C on loan.

On 7 July 2026, Amey moved on a new loan to Frosinone in Serie A.

== International career ==
He is eligible to represent Togo, through his father, Nigeria, through his mother, and Italy by birth. On 17 March 2023, Amey accepted a call-up from the Togo under-23 team but did not make his debut because of injury.

On 5 October 2023, after obtaining Italian citizenship on his 18th birthday, Amey accepted a call-up from the Italy under-19 team. In August 2025, he was called up by Italy under-20 coach Carmine Nunziata for a couple of friendly matches against England and Germany.

== Career statistics ==
As of match played 28 June 2022

Appearances and goals by club, season and competition
Club	Season	League			National cup		Other		Total	
Club	Season	Division	Apps	Goals	Apps	Goals	Apps	Goals	Apps	Goals
Bologna	2020–21	Serie A	1	0	0	0	0	0	1	0
Bologna	2021–22	Serie A	1	0	0	0	0	0	1	0
Bologna	Total		2	0	0	0	0	0	2	0
Career total			2	0	0	0	0	0	2	0
