= Selmani =

Selmani (Macedonian: Селмани) is a surname. Notable people with the surname include:

- Adolf Selmani (born 2000), Albanian football centre-back
- Astrit Selmani (born 1997), Kosovar football striker
- Driton Selmani, Kosovar visual artist
- Gentian Selmani (born 1998), Albanian football goalkeeper
- Gzim Selmani (born 1994), Dutch boxer, former wrestler, and former mixed martial artist
- Ilir Selmani (born 1978), Kosovar basketball coach and former player
- Jasir Selmani (born 1991), Macedonian football attacking midfielder
- Liridon Selmani (born 1992), Albanian football forward
- Myzejene Selmani, Kosovar engineer and parliamentarian
- Remzifaik Selmani (born 1997), Macedonian football forward
- Shpëtim Selmani, Kosovar writer and actor
- Zhuj Selmani, Albanian fighter

== See also ==
- Afroeurydemus selmani, species of beetle native to the Democratic Republic of the Congo
- Paropsisterna selmani, species of beetle native to Tasmania, Australia
