= Valentin Antov =

Bulgarian footballer (born 2000)

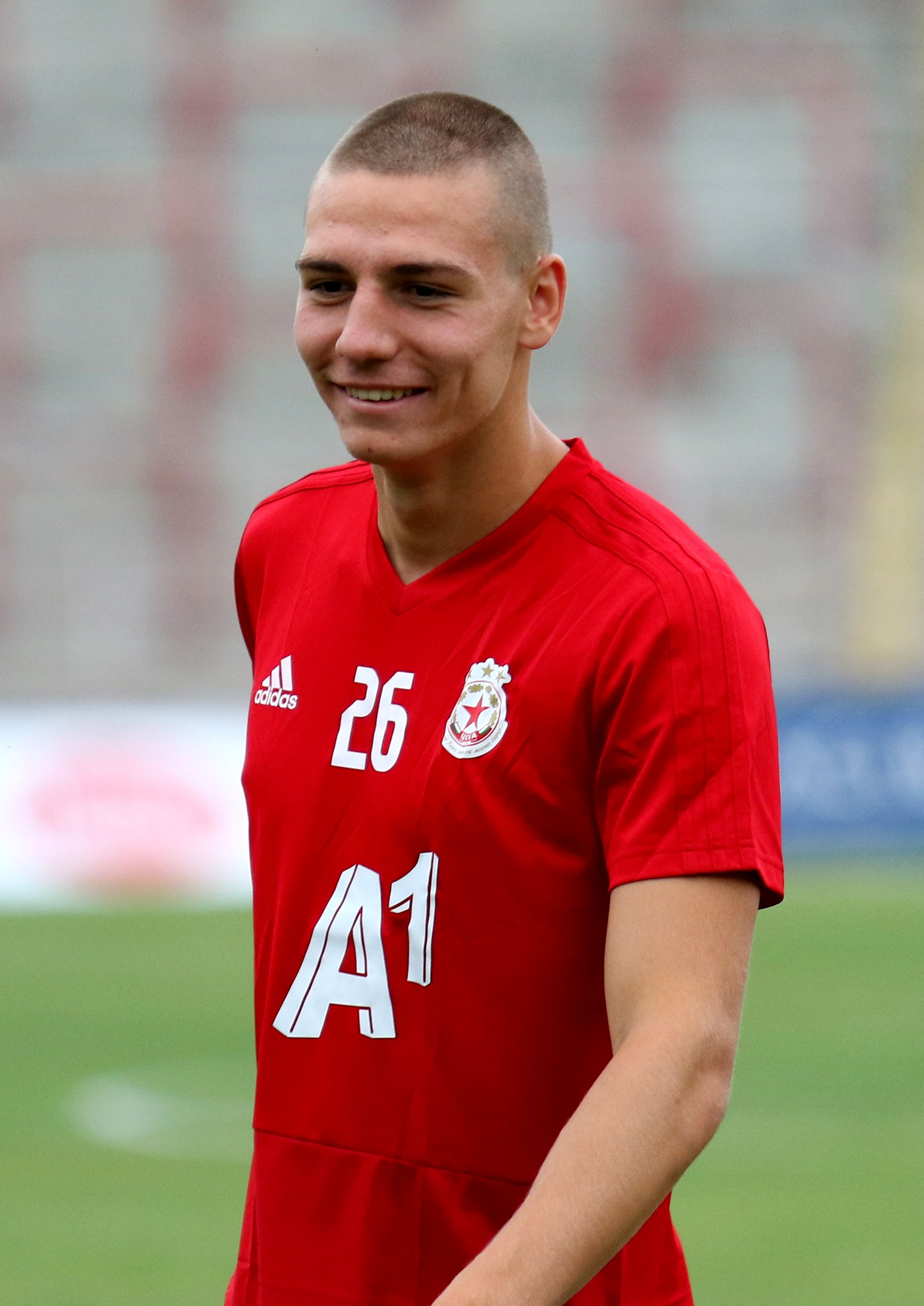
- Antov with CSKA Sofia in 2019

Personal information
- Full name: Valentin Ivaylov Antov
- Date of birth: 9 November 2000 (age 26)
- Place of birth: Sofia, Bulgaria
- Height: 1.87 m (6 ft 2 in)
- Positions: Centre-back; defensive midfielder

Team information
- Current team: Monza
- Number: 6

Youth career
- 2007–2017: CSKA Sofia

Senior career*
Years	Team	Apps	(Gls)
2016–2017	CSKA Sofia II	5	(0)
2015–2022	CSKA Sofia	60	(3)
2021	→ Bologna (loan)	5	(0)
2021–2022	→ Monza (loan)	6	(0)
2022–	Monza	10	(0)
2023–2025	→ Cremonese (loan)	62	(2)

International career^{‡}
2013–2015	Bulgaria U16	9	(0)
2015–2016	Bulgaria U17	12	(0)
2016–2017	Bulgaria U18	2	(0)
2016–2018	Bulgaria U19	5	(1)
2019–2022	Bulgaria U21	14	(0)
2019–	Bulgaria	34	(2)
- * Club domestic league appearances and goals as of 12 May 2026 ‡ National team caps and goals as of 20:07, 16 November 2026 (UTC)

Valentin Ivaylov Antov (Bulgarian: Валентин Ивайлов Антов; born 9 November 2000) is a Bulgarian professional footballer who plays as a centre-back or defensive midfielder for Serie A club Monza and the Bulgaria national team.

A youth product of CSKA Sofia, Antov became the youngest player ever to represent the club when he made his debut in 2015 at the age of 14 years, 9 months and 10 days. He moved on loan to Serie A side Bologna in the second half of the 2020–21 season, and to Serie B side Monza in the summer of 2021.

Antov has represented Bulgaria at every international level, debuting for the senior team in March 2019 at the age of 18.

== Club career ==
=== CSKA Sofia ===
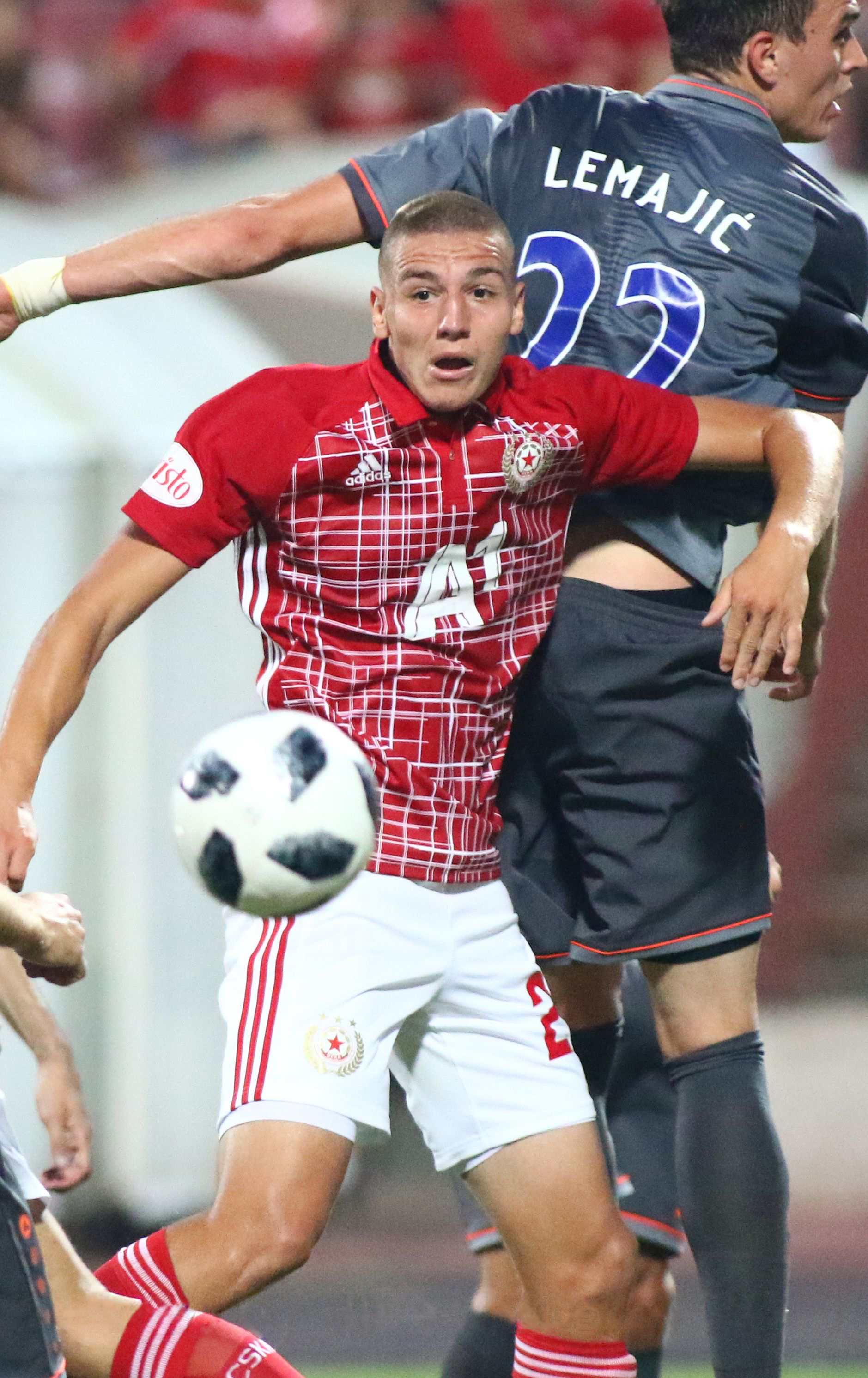
Antov playing for CSKA Sofia in 2018

On 19 August 2015, Antov made his first team debut in a Bulgarian Cup match against Sofia 2010, becoming CSKA's youngest ever debutant at the age of 14 years, 9 months and 10 days, while also becoming the youngest ever captain for the club after taking the captain's armband for the last 25 minutes of the match.

Antov made his First League debut on 14 April 2018, in a league match against Vereya. He began to establish himself in the CSKA first team during the 2018–19 season, playing 26 matches in all competitions. On 12 July 2018, Antov made his debut in the Europa League playing 90 minutes in the first match of the first qualifying round against Latvian club Riga.

==== Loan to Bologna ====
On 1 February 2021, Antov was loaned to Serie A club Bologna until the end of the season with an option for a permanent transfer.

==== Loan to Monza ====
On 27 August 2021, Antov was sent on a one-year loan to Serie B side Monza, with a conditional obligation for purchase. He made his league debut the same year on 21 September, starting in a 2–1 loss to Pisa.

=== Monza ===
Following Monza's Serie A promotion on 29 May 2022, Antov's obligation for purchase clause was triggered.

==== Loan to Cremonese ====
On 31 August 2023, Antov joined Cremonese on loan. After having played 35 games in the 2023–24 Serie B season, Antov's loan was renewed for a further season on 13 July 2024.

== International career ==
On 25 March 2019, Antov debuted for the Bulgarian senior squad as an 80th-minute substitute for Georgi Kostadinov in a Euro 2020 qualifier against Kosovo. On 23 September 2022, he scored his first international goal in a 5–1 victory against Gibraltar during the 2022–23 UEFA Nations League.

== Personal life ==
Antov is a nephew of former footballer Anatoli Nankov.

== Career statistics ==
=== Club ===
As of match played 14 March 2025

Club	Season	Division	League		National cup (Note: Includes Bulgarian Cup, Coppa Italia)		Continental		Other		Total	
Club	Season	Division	Apps	Goals	Apps	Goals	Apps	Goals	Apps	Goals	Apps	Goals
CSKA Sofia II	2016–17	Second League	5	0	—		—		—		5	0
CSKA Sofia	2015–16	Third League	4	0	1	0	—		—		5	0
CSKA Sofia	2017–18	First League	4	0	0	0	—		—		4	0
CSKA Sofia	2018–19	First League	18	0	3	0	5 (Note: Appearance(s) in UEFA Europa League)	0	—		26	0
CSKA Sofia	2019–20	First League	17	1	6	0	2	0	—		29	1
CSKA Sofia	2020–21	First League	16	2	0	0	10	0	—		26	2
CSKA Sofia	2021–22	First League	1	0	0	0	6	0	1 (Note: Appearance in Bulgarian Supercup)	0	8	0
CSKA Sofia	Total		60	3	10	0	24	0	1	0	95	3
Bologna (loan)	2020–21	Serie A	5	0	0	0	—		—		5	0
Monza (loan)	2021–22	Serie B	6	0	0	0	—		1 (Note: Appearance in play-offs)	0	7	0
Monza	2022–23	Serie A	9	0	3	0	—		—		12	0
Cremonese (loan)	2023–24	Serie B	31	1	1	0	—		2	0	34	1
Cremonese (loan)	2024–25	Serie B	26	1	2	0	—		0	0	28	1
Cremonese (loan)	Total		57	2	3	0	0	0	2	0	62	2
Career Total			141	5	16	0	24	0	4	0	185	5

=== International ===
As of match played 16 November 2026

Appearances and goals by national team and year
National team	Year	Apps	Goals
Bulgaria	2019	1	0
Bulgaria	2020	2	0
Bulgaria	2021	8	0
Bulgaria	2022	4	1
Bulgaria	2023	9	0
Bulgaria	2024	8	0
Bulgaria	2025	1	1
2026	1	0	
Total		34	2

Scores and results list Bulgaria's goal tally first, score column indicates score after each Antov goal.

List of international goals scored by Valentin Antov
No.	Date	Venue	Opponent	Score	Result	Competition
1	23 September 2022	Huvepharma Arena, Razgrad, Bulgaria	Gibraltar	1–0	5–1	2022–23 UEFA Nations League C
2	23 March 2025	Aviva Stadium, Dublin, Ireland	Republic of Ireland	1–0	1–2	UEFA Nations League relegation playoff

== Honours ==
CSKA Sofia

- Bulgarian Cup: 2020–21

Individual

- Bulgarian Youth Footballer of the Year: 2018
- Bulgarian First League Best Defender of the Year: 2020
