= Kevin Bonifazi =

Italian footballer (born 1996)

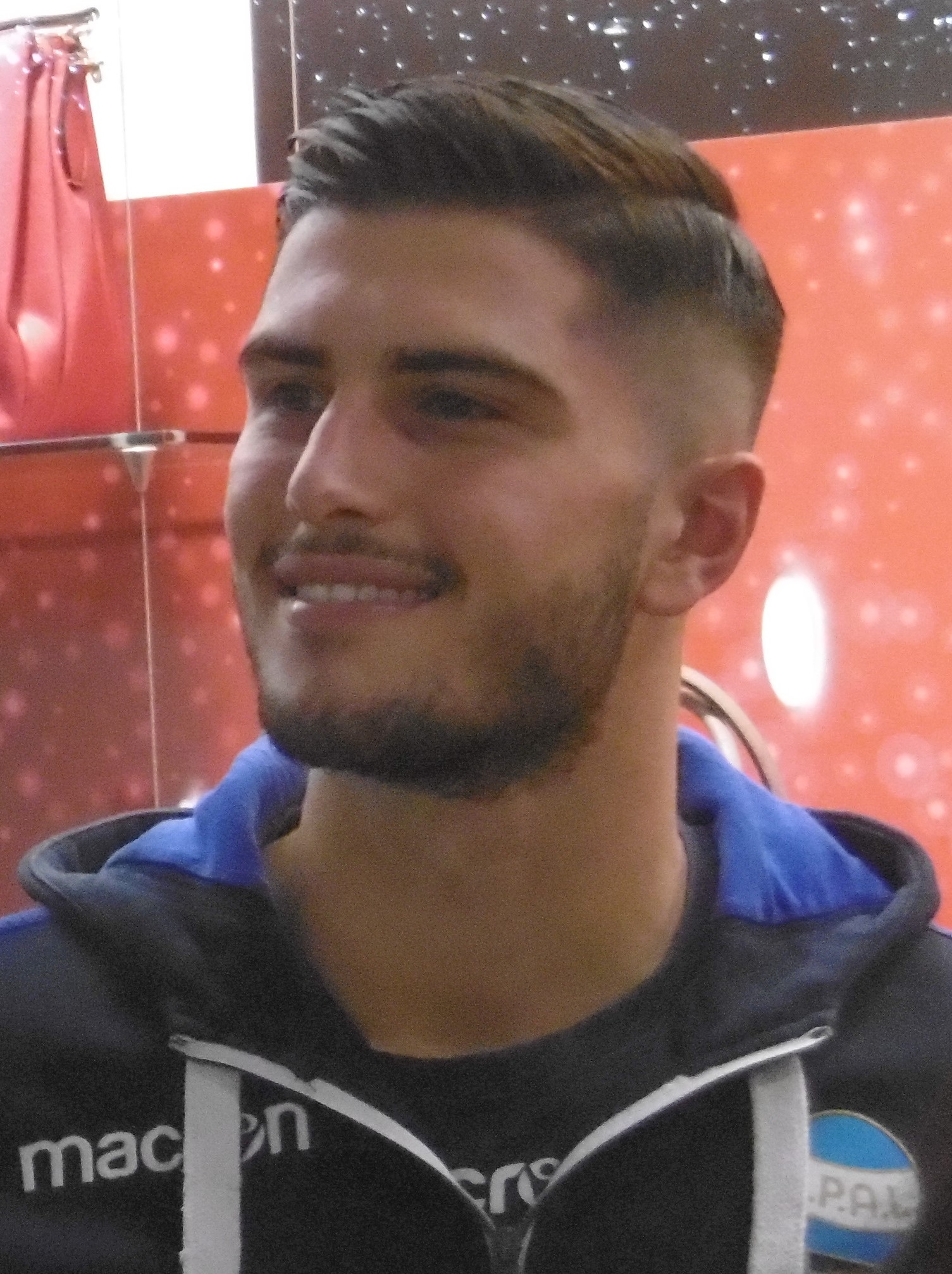
- Bonifazi with SPAL in 2018

Personal information
- Date of birth: 19 May 1996 (age 30)
- Place of birth: Toffia, Italy
- Height: 1.87 m (6 ft 2 in)
- Position: Centre-back

Team information
- Current team: Bologna

Youth career
- 2009–2011: Tor Tre Teste
- 2011–2014: Siena
- 2014–2015: Torino

Senior career*
Years	Team	Apps	(Gls)
2015–2019	Torino	6	(0)
2015–2016	→ Benevento (loan)	3	(0)
2016	→ Casertana (loan)	8	(1)
2016–2017	→ SPAL (loan)	20	(3)
2018–2019	→ SPAL (loan)	26	(2)
2019	SPAL	0	(0)
2019–2020	Torino	3	(1)
2020	→ SPAL (loan)	14	(1)
2020–2021	SPAL	0	(0)
2020–2021	→ Udinese (loan)	30	(0)
2021–	Bologna	36	(0)
2024	→ Frosinone (loan)	6	(0)
2024	→ Lecce (loan)	3	(0)
2025	→ Sassuolo (loan)	0	(0)

International career
2017–2019	Italy U21	7	(0)
- * Club domestic league appearances and goals as of 13 May 2025

Kevin Bonifazi (born 19 May 1996) is an Italian professional footballer who plays as a centre-back for Serie A club Bologna.

== Club career ==
He began his playing career with Tor di Quinto and Nuova Tor Tre Teste. At age 15 he was sold to Siena, but following the bankruptcy of the club was signed by Torino in 2014. He won the Campionato Nazionale Primavera with the Granata in the 2014–15 season.

The following season, he was loaned to Benevento in Lega Pro. He made his professional debut on 20 September 2015 in a game against Foggia. In January 2016, he was loaned to Casertana. He scored his first goal for the club on 14 February 2016, a home draw against Juve Stabia.

On 19 July 2016, Torino officially announced his loan to SPAL in Serie B. He made his competitive debut for SPAL on 22 October in a 3–1 home win against Carpi. He scored his first goal for the club on 3 December, a 2–1 win away to Cittadella. On 17 March 2017, Torino announced they had renewed his contract until 2022.

He made his senior debut for Torino on 29 November, in the Coppa Italia against Carpi. On 31 March 2018, he made his Serie A debut, entering as a substitute for Nicolas Nkoulou in a 4–0 win against Cagliari in Sardinia.

On 16 August 2018, he returned to SPAL on loan with an option to buy, and a buy-back option in favour of Torino. On 20 October, he scored his first Serie A goal in a 2–0 victory against Roma in his first appearance back at SPAL.

On 24 January 2020 he returned to SPAL once more on loan, which turned into a permanent transfer at the end of the 2019–20 season as certain conditions were met. He also signed a 4.5-year contract with SPAL.

On 25 September 2020, he joined Udinese on loan with an option to buy.

On 2 July 2021, Bonifazi moved to Bologna. On 8 January 2024, Bologna sent him on loan to fellow Serie A club Frosinone until the end of the 2023–24 season. On 30 August 2024, Bonifazi moved on loan to Lecce, with an option to buy. On 3 February 2025, he moved on a new loan to Sassuolo.

== International career ==
On 1 September 2017 he made his debut with the Italy U21 team in a friendly match lost 3–0 against Spain.

== Personal life ==
On 22 August 2020 he tested positive for COVID-19.

== Career statistics ==
As of match played 21 May 2022

Appearances and goals by club, season and competition
Club	Season	League			National Cup		Continental		Other		Total	
Club	Season	Division	Apps	Goals	Apps	Goals	Apps	Goals	Apps	Goals	Apps	Goals
Benevento (loan)	2015–16	Lega Pro	3	0	2	0	—		—		5	0
Casertana (loan)	2015–16	Lega Pro	8	1	0	0	—		—		8	1
SPAL (loan)	2016–17	Serie B	20	3	0	0	—		—		20	3
Torino	2017–18	Serie A	6	0	1	0	—		—		7	0
SPAL (loan)	2018–19	Serie A	26	2	1	0	—		—		27	2
Torino	2019–20	Serie A	3	1	1	0	3	1	—		7	2
Torino	Total		9	1	2	0	3	1	0	0	14	2
SPAL (loan)	2019–20	Serie A	14	1	0	0	—		—		14	1
SPAL (loan)	Total		60	6	1	0	0	0	0	0	61	6
Udinese (loan)	2020–21	Serie A	30	0	2	0	—		—		32	0
Bologna	2021–22	Serie A	22	0	1	0	—		—		23	0
Career total			132	8	8	0	3	1	0	0	143	9

== Honours ==
=== Club ===
Torino

- Campionato Primavera: 2014–15

SPAL

- Serie B: 2016–17

Sassuolo

- Serie B: 2024–25
