= Myzejene Selmani =

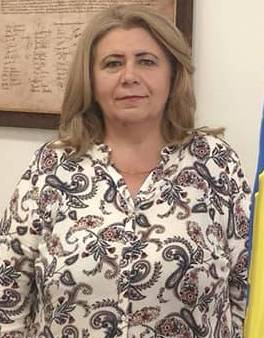
Myzejene Selmani

Myzejene Selmani (Albanian pronunciation: [myzɛjˈɛːnɛ sɛlˈmaːni]) is a Kosovo Albanian engineer and politician, serving as a Member of Parliament of Kosovo since 2007. She is a member of the New Kosovo Alliance political party. On March 31, 2011, she was announced as a candidate for President of Kosovo, running against former party chairman Behgjet Pacolli in the upcoming parliamentary vote that week. The next day, her party said that Suzan Novoberdali not Selmani was going to run for president.

Selmani serves on the Parliamentary Committee on Rights, Interests of Communities, and Returns and the Committee for Economic Development, Infrastructure, Trade, and Industry.
