= Omar Khailoti =

Moroccan footballer

Personal information
- Date of birth: 5 September 2001 (age 25)
- Place of birth: Macerata, Italy
- Height: 1.92 m (6 ft 4 in)
- Position: Left-back

Team information
- Current team: Novara
- Number: 15

Youth career
- 2018–2020: Bologna

Senior career*
Years	Team	Apps	(Gls)
2020–2022	Bologna	1	(0)
2021–2022	→ Carrarese (loan)	14	(0)
2022–	Novara	86	(3)

International career^{‡}
2022–	Morocco U23	1	(0)
- * Club domestic league appearances and goals as of 30 April 2026 ‡ National team caps and goals as of 15:23, 6 June 2022 (UTC)

Omar Khailoti (born 5 September 2001) is a professional footballer who plays as a defender for Serie C Group A club Novara. Born in Italy, he is a youth international for Morocco.

== Club career ==
=== Bologna ===
Grew up in the Bologna youth system, he made Serie A debut on 5 December 2020 in a away 3–1 loss against Inter.

==== Loan to Carrarese ====
On 31 August 2021, he joined Carrarese on loan.

=== Novara ===
On 14 July 2022, Khailoti signed a three-year contract with Novara.

== International career ==
In November 2020, he was called up by Morocco national under-20 football team for a stage. As he did not yet debuted in official matches, he remain available for selection for both Morocco and Italy.

== Statistics ==
=== Club ===
As of match played 22 December 2021

Appearances and goals by club, season and competition
Club	Season	League	League		Cup		Europe		Other		Total	
Club	Season	League	Apps	Goals	Apps	Goals	Apps	Goals	Apps	Goals	Apps	Goals
Bologna	2020–21	Serie A	1	0	0	0	–		–		1	0
Carrarese (on loan)	2021–22	Serie C	7	0	0	0	–		–		7	0
Career total			8	0	0	0	0	0	0	0	8	0
