= Andri Baldursson =

Icelandic footballer (born 2002)

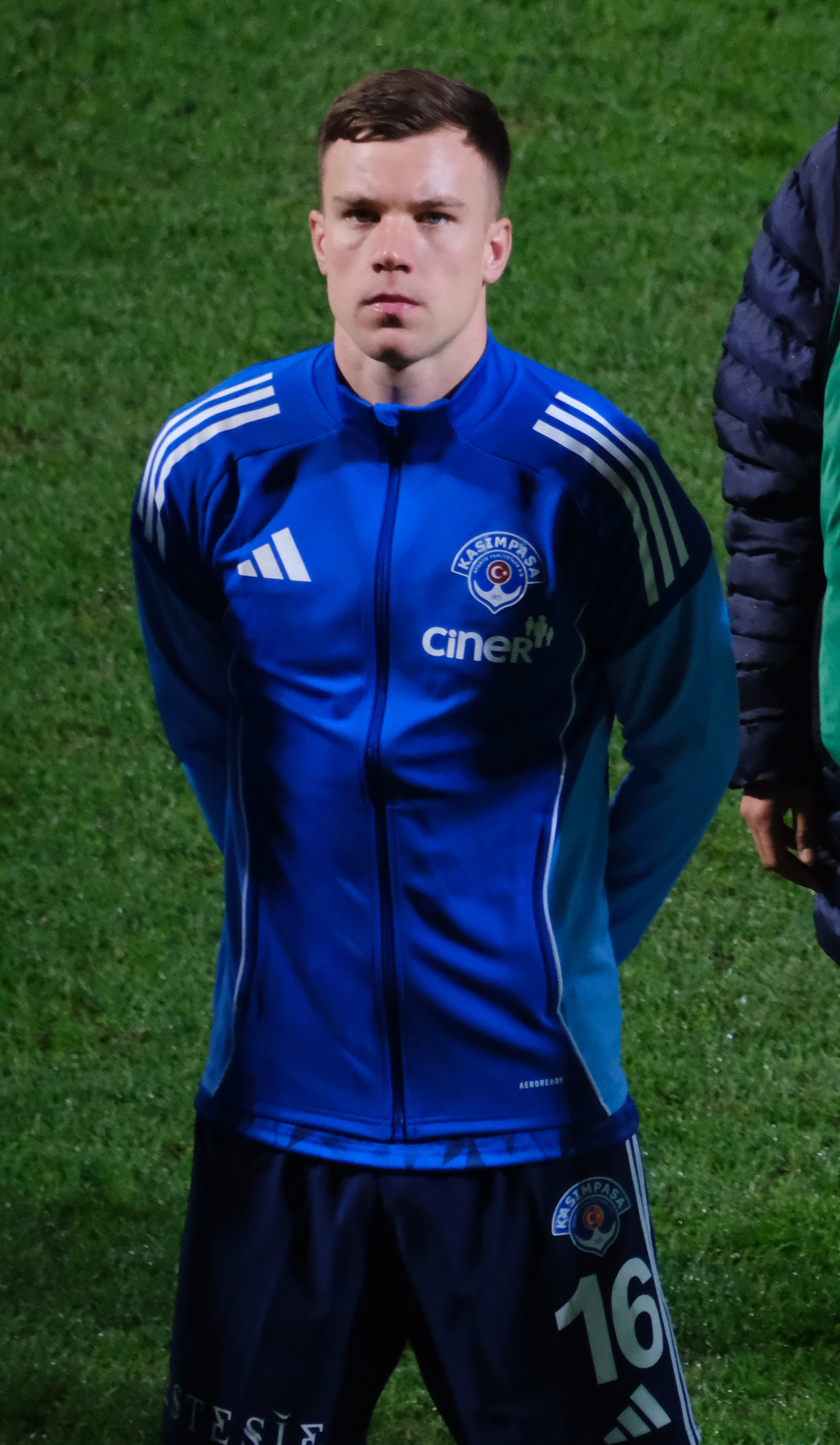
- Baldursson with Kasımpaşa in 2026

Personal information
- Full name: Andri Fannar Baldursson
- Date of birth: 10 January 2002 (age 24)
- Place of birth: Kópavogur, Iceland
- Height: 1.87 m (6 ft 2 in)
- Position: Midfielder

Team information
- Current team: Kasımpaşa
- Number: 16

Youth career
- –2019: Breiðablik
- 2019: → Bologna (loan)
- 2019–2020: Bologna

Senior career*
Years	Team	Apps	(Gls)
2018–2019	Breiðablik	1	(0)
2020–2025	Bologna	15	(0)
2021–2022	→ Copenhagen (loan)	3	(0)
2022–2023	→ NEC (loan)	11	(0)
2023–2024	→ IF Elfsborg (loan)	35	(0)
2025–	Kasımpaşa	31	(0)

International career^{‡}
2018	Iceland U16	4	(1)
2018–2019	Iceland U17	21	(3)
2018–2019	Iceland U18	4	(0)
2019	Iceland U19	5	(0)
2020–2024	Iceland U21	22	(1)
2020–	Iceland	15	(0)
- * Club domestic league appearances and goals as of 10 June 2026 ‡ National team caps and goals as of 3 October 2026

Andri Fannar Baldursson (born 10 January 2002) is an Icelandic professional footballer who plays as a midfielder for Turkish club Kasımpaşa and the Iceland national team.

== Club career ==
Andri started his career with local club Breiðablik in Kópavogur before going on loan to Bologna in January 2019. He impressed and was bought by Bologna in August 2019. Andri made his debut in Serie A on 22 February 2020, coming on as a 59th-minute substitute for Andreas Skov Olsen in a 1–1 draw against Udinese, becoming the fifth Icelander to ever play in Serie A. In 2020 Andri was the youngest Icelandic player to play in the top five leagues in Europe.

On 23 August 2021, Danish Superliga club Copenhagen confirmed that Andri had joined the club on a season-long loan deal with an option to buy. After a season of limited playing time due to injuries - only eight appearances - he returned to Bologna at the end of the season.

On 6 July 2022, Andri joined NEC in the Netherlands on a season-long loan with an option to buy.

On 10 August 2023, Andri moved on a new loan to IF Elfsborg in Sweden.

On 30 July 2025, Andri transferred to Kasımpaşa in Turkey.

== International career ==
Andri has featured for the U16, U17, U18, U19 and U21 Icelandic youth national teams.

He made his Iceland senior national team debut on 8 September 2020 in a Nations League game against Belgium. He started the game and was substituted after 54 minutes in a 5–1 away loss.

== Career statistics ==
=== Club ===
As of match played 31 August 2023

Appearances and goals by club, season and competition
Club	Season	League			Cup (Note: Includes Coppa Italia, Danish Cup, KNVB Cup)		Europe		Other		Total	
Club	Season	Division	Apps	Goals	Apps	Goals	Apps	Goals	Apps	Goals	Apps	Goals
Breiðablik	2018	Úrvalsdeild	1	0	0	0	–		0	0	1	0
Bologna	2019–20	Serie A	7	0	0	0	–		0	0	7	0
Bologna	2020–21	Serie A	8	0	1	0	–		0	0	9	0
Bologna	Total		15	0	1	0	0	0	0	0	16	0
Copenhagen (loan)	2021–22	Superliga	3	0	1	0	4 (Note: Appearance(s) in UEFA Conference League)	0	—		8	0
NEC (loan)	2022–23	Eredivisie	11	0	1	0	–		–		12	0
Career total			30	0	3	0	4	0	0	0	37	0

== Honours ==
Copenhagen

- Danish Superliga: 2021–22
- The Atlantic Cup: runner-up 2022
