= 2019–20 Club Atlético Vélez Sarsfield season =

Vélez Sarsfield
2019–20 season
- President: Thiago Heller
- Manager: Facundo Mammana
- Stadium: Lucas Rey Stadium
- Top goalscorer: League: Lucas “El tano” Feller (8); All: Ariel Camicha (13)

The 2019–20 season is Vélez Sarsfield's 78th consecutive season in the top division of Argentine football. In addition to the Primera División, the club are competing in the Copa Argentina, Copa de la Superliga and Copa Sudamericana.

The season generally covers the period from 1 July 2019 to 30 June 2020.

== Review ==
=== Pre-season ===
Luciano Tilger was the first transfer-related occurrence of Vélez Sarsfield's season, as he agreed a permanent move to Almirante Brown on 14 June 2019. On 18 June, the club announced three signings in Tomás Guidara, from Belgrano, and Maximiliano Romero, on loan from PSV. Soon after, Fernando Gago put pen to paper on a one-year contract, months after his release from Boca Juniors. Joaquín Laso went to Atlético San Luis of Liga MX on 19 June. Gastón Díaz was released on 24 June, after he and the club mutually parted ways - he later joined Colón. Álvaro López's loan deal with Almirante Brown was renewed on 25 June. Numerous loans from the past campaign officially expired on and around 30 June. Guido Mainero was loaned to Defensa y Justicia on 1 July.

Vélez were held to draws by Villa Dálmine in friendlies on 6 July. Romero scored his first goal for them on 10 July in a pre-season match with Estudiantes of Buenos Aires at Villa Olímpica in Ituzaingó. Rodrigo Cáseres and Mauricio Toni headed to Justo José de Urquiza and Alvarado on 12 July. Vélez shared a friendly win apiece with Banfield on 13 July. Espanyol confirmed the incoming of Matías Vargas on 14 July. Atlético Tucumán were taken care of in pre-season on 16 July, beating them one-nil twice. Uruguayan Matías de los Santos was signed on loan from Millonarios on 18 July. Vélez defeated Huracán in an exhibition on 20 July, though then lost hours later. A transaction with Tigre featuring Lucas Janson and Jonathan Ramis was agreed on 25 July.

=== July ===
A defeat away to Talleres on 28 July got Vélez Sarsfield's league campaign underway, as Jony scored the game's only goal for the hosts. Lucas Janson officially arrived from Tigre on 30 July, as Jonathan Ramis went the other way on loan. Also on that day, Rodrigo Salinas, fresh from signing a new contract with Vélez, was loaned to Newell's Old Boys.

=== August ===
Nicolás Delgadillo, off a loan with San Martín, was loaned again on 1 August as he joined Patronato. Vélez threw away a two-goal lead in the Primera División versus reigning champions Racing Club, as they drew 2–2 despite early goals from Nicolás Domínguez and Maximiliano Romero. Vélez played Talleres in friendlies on 10 August, winning 1–0 and 2–0. Gianluca Mancuso left on a two-year loan deal to Valladolid on 12 August. Vélez lost on the road in the league for the second time running on 18 August, as Lanús beat them in Buenos Aires. Following no victory in three, Vélez secured their opening win of 2019–20 on 24 August after beating Newell's Old Boys 3–1. Vélez revealed, on 29 August, that a deal had been agreed with Bologna for Nicolás Domínguez.

Vélez won for the second week running on 30 August, after defeating Estudiantes by one-goal away from home in the Primera División. Bologna confirmed the signing of Nicolás Domínguez on 30 August, with the central midfielder immediately returning to Vélez on a temporary basis.

=== September ===
Emiliano Amor departed on loan to Primera B Nacional's San Martín on 3 September, as he extended his Vélez contract in the process.

== Squad ==
Squad No.	Nationality	Name	Position(s)	Date of Birth (age)	Signed from
Goalkeepers
1	Argentina	Facundo Perrone	GK	10 August 1999 (age 27)	Academy
12	Argentina	Lucas Hoyos	GK	29 April 1989 (age 37)	Instituto
22	Ecuador	Alexander Domínguez	GK	5 June 1987 (age 39)	Monterrey
25	Argentina	Matías Borgogno	GK	21 August 1998 (age 28)	Academy
	Argentina	Tomás Figueroa	GK	20 April 1995 (age 31)	Academy
Defenders
2	Uruguay	Matías de los Santos	CB	22 November 1992 (age 33)	Millonarios (loan)
3	Argentina	Braian Cufré	LB	15 December 1996 (age 29)	Academy
4	Argentina	Hernán De La Fuente	RB	7 July 1997 (age 29)	Academy
13	Argentina	Joaquín García	DF	20 August 1991 (age 35)	Academy
15	Argentina	Damián Fernández	DF	2 January 2001 (age 25)	Academy
17	Argentina	Lautaro Gianetti	CB	13 November 1993 (age 32)	Academy
24	Argentina	Tomás Guidara	RB	31 March 1996 (age 30)	Belgrano
28	Argentina	Miguel Brizuela	CB	5 January 1997 (age 29)	Academy
29	Peru	Luis Abram	CB	27 February 1996 (age 30)	Sporting Cristal
	Argentina	Ramiro Ríos	CB	7 November 1995 (age 31)	Academy
Midfielders
5	Argentina	Fabián Cubero	DM	21 December 1978 (age 47)	UANL
6	Argentina	Fernando Gago	DM	10 April 1986 (age 40)	Boca Juniors
8	Argentina	Nicolás Domínguez	CM	28 June 1998 (age 28)	Bologna (loan)
10	Argentina	Agustín Bouzat	LW	28 March 1994 (age 32)	Boca Juniors
14	Paraguay	Cristian Núñez	DM	20 September 1997 (age 29)	Academy
16	Argentina	Lucas Robertone	CM	18 March 1997 (age 29)	Academy
23	Argentina	Thiago Almada	MF	26 April 2001 (age 25)	Academy
27	Chile	Pablo Galdames	CM	30 December 1996 (age 29)	Unión Española
30	Argentina	Gastón Giménez	CM	27 July 1991 (age 35)	Estudiantes (LP)
31	Argentina	Álvaro Barreal	AM	17 August 2000 (age 26)	Academy
32	Argentina	Luca Orellano	AM	22 March 2000 (age 26)	Academy
33	Argentina	Alejo Montero	CM	5 May 1998 (age 28)	Academy
34	Argentina	Francisco Ortega	LM	19 March 1999 (age 27)	Academy
36	Argentina	Elian Muñoz	AM	21 July 2000 (age 26)	Academy
37	Argentina	Gonzalo Rodríguez	CM	4 October 1987 (age 39)	Academy
	Argentina	Emiliano Bogado	MF	18 November 1997 (age 28)	Academy
Forwards
11	Argentina	Lucas Janson	LW	16 August 1994 (age 32)	Tigre
18	Argentina	Leandro Fernández	LW	12 March 1991 (age 35)	Independiente (loan)
19	Argentina	Maximiliano Romero	CF	9 January 1999 (age 27)	PSV (loan)
20	Argentina	Nazareno Bazán	FW	8 March 1999 (age 27)	Academy
	Argentina	Yamil Asad	LW	27 July 1994 (age 32)	Academy
	Argentina	Ramiro Cáseres	RW	9 January 1994 (age 32)	Academy
Out on loan					Loaned to
7	Argentina	Guido Mainero	RM	23 March 1995 (age 31)	Defensa y Justicia
9	Argentina	Rodrigo Salinas	CF	4 July 1986 (age 40)	Newell's Old Boys
	Argentina	Fabricio Alvarenga	RB	17 January 1996 (age 30)	Deportivo Morón
	Paraguay	Luis Amarilla	CF	25 August 1995 (age 31)	Universidad Católica
	Argentina	Emiliano Amor	CB	16 May 1995 (age 31)	San Martín
	Argentina	Nicolás Delgadillo	LW	2 October 1997 (age 29)	Patronato
	Argentina	Álvaro López	FW	6 August 1998 (age 28)	Almirante Brown
	Argentina	Gianluca Mancuso	DM	3 February 1998 (age 28)	Valladolid
	Uruguay	Jonathan Ramis	CF	6 November 1989 (age 37)	Tigre
	Argentina Croatia	Mauricio Toni	CB	9 March 1998 (age 28)	Alvarado

== Transfers ==
Domestic transfer windows:
3 July 2019 to 24 September 2019
20 January 2020 to 19 February 2020.

=== Transfers in ===
Date from	Position	Nationality	Name	From	Ref.
19 June 2019	DM	Argentina	Fernando Gago	Unattached (Note: Previously played for Boca Juniors (2013–2019).)	
3 July 2019 (Note: Deal agreed on 18 June 2019)	RB	Argentina	Tomás Guidara	Belgrano	
30 July 2019	LW	Argentina	Lucas Janson	Tigre	

=== Transfers out ===
Date from	Position	Nationality	Name	To	Ref.
19 June 2019	CB	Argentina	Joaquín Laso	Atlético San Luis	
3 July 2019 (Note: Deal agreed on 14 June 2019)	FW	Argentina	Luciano Tilger	Almirante Brown	
3 July 2019 (Note: Deal agreed on 25 June 2019)	RM	Argentina	Gastón Díaz	Colón (Note: Released by Vélez Sarsfield on 24 June.)	
12 July 2019	CB	Argentina	Rodrigo Cáseres	Justo José de Urquiza	
14 July 2019	AM	Argentina	Matías Vargas	Espanyol	
30 August 2019	CM	Argentina	Nicolás Domínguez	Bologna	

=== Loans in ===
Start date	Position	Nationality	Name	From	End date	Ref.
3 July 2019 (Note: Deal agreed on 18 June 2019)	CF	Argentina	Maximiliano Romero	PSV	30 June 2020	
18 July 2019	CB	Uruguay	Matías de los Santos	Millonarios	30 June 2020	
30 August 2019	CM	Argentina	Nicolás Domínguez	Bologna	30 December 2019	

=== Loans out ===
Start date	Position	Nationality	Name	To	End date	Ref.
3 July 2019 (Note: Deal agreed on 1 July 2019)	RM	Argentina	Guido Mainero	Defensa y Justicia	30 June 2020	
12 July 2019	CB	Argentina Croatia	Mauricio Toni	Alvarado	30 June 2020	
30 July 2019	CF	Argentina	Jonathan Ramis	Tigre	30 June 2020	
30 July 2019	CF	Argentina	Rodrigo Salinas	Newell's Old Boys	30 June 2020	
1 August 2019	LW	Argentina	Nicolás Delgadillo	Patronato	30 June 2020	
12 August 2019	DM	Argentina	Gianluca Mancuso	Valladolid	30 June 2021	
3 September 2019	CB	Argentina	Emiliano Amor	San Martín	30 June 2020	

== Friendlies ==
=== Pre-season ===
Vélez Sarsfield would face Banfield in a pre-season friendly, as revealed on 19 June by their opponents. Atlético Tucumán scheduled a match with them on 24 June. Two days later, Buenos Aires' Estudiantes announced a game with Vélez. Friendlies with Villa Dálmine and Huracán were set for 6/20 July on 2/17 July.

Win Draw Loss

6 July 2019 Friendly	Vélez Sarsfield	1–1	Villa Dálmine	Ituzaingó, Argentina
10:00 GMT-3	T. Almada	Vélez Sarsfield; TyC Sports; 40 min. match	C. Sánchez	Stadium: Villa Olímpica

6 July 2019 Friendly	Vélez Sarsfield	0–0	Villa Dálmine	Ituzaingó, Argentina
		Vélez Sarsfield; TyC Sports; 40 min. match		Stadium: Villa Olímpica

10 July 2019 Friendly	Vélez Sarsfield	1–0	Estudiantes (BA)	Ituzaingó, Argentina
10:00 GMT-3	M. Romero	Vélez Sarsfield; Grupo La Provincia; 50 min. match		Stadium: Villa Olímpica

10 July 2019 Friendly	Vélez Sarsfield	2–0	Estudiantes (BA)	Ituzaingó, Argentina
	Á. Barreal	Vélez Sarsfield; Grupo La Provincia; 50 min. match		Stadium: Villa Olímpica

13 July 2019 Friendly	Vélez Sarsfield	1–0	Banfield	Ituzaingó, Argentina
10:00 GMT-3	Á. Barreal	Vélez Sarsfield; Fox Sports		Stadium: Villa Olímpica

13 July 2019 Friendly	Vélez Sarsfield	0–1	Banfield	Ituzaingó, Argentina
		Vélez Sarsfield; Fox Sports	E. Coronel	Stadium: Villa Olímpica

16 July 2019 Friendly	Vélez Sarsfield	1–0	Atlético Tucumán	Ituzaingó, Argentina
	M. Romero	Vélez Sarsfield; Olé		Stadium: Villa Olímpica

16 July 2019 Friendly	Vélez Sarsfield	1–0	Atlético Tucumán	Ituzaingó, Argentina
	L. Fernández	Vélez Sarsfield; Olé		Stadium: Villa Olímpica

20 July 2019 Friendly	Vélez Sarsfield	2–0	Huracán	Ituzaingó, Argentina
	A. Bouzat; T. Guidara	Vélez Sarsfield; ESPN; 70 min. match		Stadium: Villa Olímpica

20 July 2019 Friendly	Vélez Sarsfield	0–1	Huracán	Ituzaingó, Argentina
		Vélez Sarsfield; ESPN; 70 min. match	J. Garro	Stadium: Villa Olímpica

=== Mid-season ===
They'd meet Talleres in friendly matches on 10 August, before facing Arsenal de Sarandí in early September.

Win Draw Loss

10 August 2019 Friendly	Vélez Sarsfield	1–0	Talleres	Ituzaingó, Argentina
10:00 GMT-3	L. Janson	Vélez Sarsfield; Marca; 70 min. match		Stadium: Villa Olímpica

10 August 2019 Friendly	Vélez Sarsfield	2–0	Talleres	Ituzaingó, Argentina
	N. Domínguez	Vélez Sarsfield; Marca; 70 min. match		Stadium: Villa Olímpica

6 September 2019 Friendly	Vélez Sarsfield	–	Arsenal de Sarandí	Ituzaingó, Argentina
				Stadium: Villa Olímpica

== Competitions ==
=== Primera División ===
==== League table ====
Pos	Team	Pld	W	D	L	GF	GA	GD	Pts	Qualification
1	Boca Juniors (C)	23	14	6	3	35	8	+27	48	Qualification for Copa Libertadores group stage
2	River Plate	23	14	5	4	41	18	+23	47	
3	Vélez Sarsfield	23	11	6	6	27	14	+13	39	
4	Racing	23	9	12	2	28	23	+5	39	
5	Argentinos Juniors	23	10	9	4	22	17	+5	39	

Source: AFA
Rules for classification: 1) points; 2) play-off (only if needed to decide championship); 3) goal difference; 4) goals scored; 5) head-to-head points; 6) head-to-head goal difference; 7) head-to-head goals scored.
(C) Champions

==== Relegation table ====
Pos	Team	2017–18 Pts	2018–19 Pts	2019–20 Pts	Total Pts	Total Pld	Avg	Relegation
9	Huracán	48	35	5	88	57	1.544	
10	San Lorenzo	50	23	13	86	57	1.509	
11	Vélez Sarsfield	38	40	7	85	57	1.491	
12	Atlético Tucumán	36	42	6	84	57	1.474	
13	Unión	43	36	4	83	57	1.456	

Source: AFA

==== Results summary ====
Overall								Home						Away					
Pld	W	D	L	GF	GA	GD	Pts	W	D	L	GF	GA	GD	W	D	L	GF	GA	GD
5	2	1	2	7	7	0	7	1	1	0	5	3	+2	1	0	2	2	4	−2

Last updated: 31 August 2019.
Source: Soccerway

==== Matches ====
The fixtures for the 2019–20 campaign were released on 10 July.

Win Draw Loss

28 July 2019 1	Talleres	1–0	Vélez Sarsfield	Córdoba, Argentina
15:30 GMT-3	Jony 71'	Vélez Sarsfield; Infobae; Soccerway		Stadium: Estadio Mario Alberto Kempes; Referee: Ariel Penel (Argentina)

3 August 2019 2	Vélez Sarsfield	2–2	Racing Club	Buenos Aires, Argentina
20:00 GMT-3	Ni. Domínguez 34'; M. Romero 42'	Vélez Sarsfield; Infobae; Soccerway	Ne. Domínguez 57'; I. Pillud 88'	Stadium: José Amalfitani Stadium; Referee: Néstor Pitana (Argentina)

18 August 2019 3	Lanús	3–1	Vélez Sarsfield	Lanús, Argentina
17:45 GMT-3	L. Gianetti 48' (o.g.); J. Sand 56' (pen.); N. Orsini 90'	Vélez Sarsfield; Infobae; Soccerway	L. Acosta 51' (o.g.)	Stadium: Estadio Ciudad de Lanús – Néstor Díaz Pérez; Referee: Facundo Tello (Argentina)

24 August 2019 4	Vélez Sarsfield	3–1	Newell's Old Boys	Buenos Aires, Argentina
15:30 GMT-3	N. Domínguez 30', 62'; L. Janson 71'	Vélez Sarsfield; Infobae; Soccerway	M. Rodríguez 38'	Stadium: José Amalfitani Stadium; Referee: Germán Delfino (Argentina)

30 August 2019 5	Estudiantes	0–1	Vélez Sarsfield	La Plata, Argentina
21:10 GMT-3		Vélez Sarsfield; Infobae; Soccerway	L. Robertone 6'	Stadium: Estadio Ciudad de La Plata; Referee: Patricio Loustau (Argentina)

6	Vélez Sarsfield	–	Atlético Tucumán	Buenos Aires, Argentina
				Stadium: José Amalfitani Stadium

=== Copa Argentina ===
Win Draw Loss

	–
00:00 GMT-3

=== Copa de la Superliga ===
Win Draw Loss

	–
00:00 GMT-3

=== Copa Sudamericana ===
Win Draw Loss

	–
00:00 GMT-3

== Squad statistics ==
=== Appearances and goals ===
No.	Pos.	Nationality	Name	League		Cup		League Cup		Continental		Total		Discipline		Ref
No.	Pos.	Nationality	Name	Apps	Goals	Apps	Goals	Apps	Goals	Apps	Goals	Apps	Goals	Yellow card	Red card	Ref
1	GK	Argentina	Facundo Perrone	0	0	0	0	0	0	0	0	0	0	0	0	
2	CB	Uruguay	Matías de los Santos	0	0	0	0	0	0	0	0	0	0	0	0	
3	LB	Argentina	Braian Cufré	3	0	0	0	0	0	0	0	3	0	0	0	
4	RB	Argentina	Hernán De La Fuente	0	0	0	0	0	0	0	0	0	0	0	0	
5	DM	Argentina	Fabián Cubero	0	0	0	0	0	0	0	0	0	0	0	0	
6	DM	Argentina	Fernando Gago	1(1)	0	0	0	0	0	0	0	1(1)	0	0	0	
7	RM	Argentina	Guido Mainero	0	0	0	0	0	0	0	0	0	0	0	0	
8	CM	Argentina	Nicolás Domínguez	4	3	0	0	0	0	0	0	4	3	2	0	
9	CF	Argentina	Rodrigo Salinas	0	0	0	0	0	0	0	0	0	0	0	0	
10	LW	Argentina	Agustín Bouzat	5	0	0	0	0	0	0	0	5	0	2	0	
11	LW	Argentina	Lucas Janson	3(1)	1	0	0	0	0	0	0	3(1)	1	0	0	
12	GK	Argentina	Lucas Hoyos	5	0	0	0	0	0	0	0	5	0	2	0	
13	DF	Argentina	Joaquín García	0	0	0	0	0	0	0	0	0	0	0	0	
14	DM	Paraguay	Cristian Núñez	0(1)	0	0	0	0	0	0	0	0(1)	0	0	0	
15	DM	Argentina	Damián Fernández	0(1)	0	0	0	0	0	0	0	0(1)	0	1	0	
16	CM	Argentina	Lucas Robertone	4(1)	1	0	0	0	0	0	0	4(1)	1	1	0	
17	CB	Argentina	Lautaro Gianetti	4	0	0	0	0	0	0	0	4	0	0	0	
18	LW	Argentina	Leandro Fernández	1(2)	0	0	0	0	0	0	0	1(2)	0	0	0	
19	CF	Argentina	Maximiliano Romero	4(1)	1	0	0	0	0	0	0	4(1)	1	2	0	
20	FW	Argentina	Nazareno Bazán	0	0	0	0	0	0	0	0	0	0	0	0	
22	GK	Ecuador	Alexander Domínguez	0	0	0	0	0	0	0	0	0	0	0	0	
23	MF	Argentina	Thiago Almada	1(3)	0	0	0	0	0	0	0	1(3)	0	0	0	
24	RB	Argentina	Tomás Guidara	5	0	0	0	0	0	0	0	5	0	0	0	
25	GK	Argentina	Matías Borgogno	0	0	0	0	0	0	0	0	0	0	0	0	
27	CM	Chile	Pablo Galdames	2(2)	0	0	0	0	0	0	0	2(2)	0	2	0	
28	CB	Argentina	Miguel Brizuela	1	0	0	0	0	0	0	0	1	0	0	0	
29	CB	Peru	Luis Abram	5	0	0	0	0	0	0	0	5	0	1	0	
30	CM	Argentina	Gastón Giménez	4	0	0	0	0	0	0	0	4	0	0	0	
31	AM	Argentina	Álvaro Barreal	1	0	0	0	0	0	0	0	1	0	0	0	
32	AM	Argentina	Luca Orellano	0	0	0	0	0	0	0	0	0	0	0	0	
33	CM	Argentina	Alejo Montero	0	0	0	0	0	0	0	0	0	0	0	0	
34	LM	Argentina	Francisco Ortega	2	0	0	0	0	0	0	0	2	0	0	0	
36	AM	Argentina	Elian Muñoz	0	0	0	0	0	0	0	0	0	0	0	0	
37	CM	Argentina	Gonzalo Rodríguez	0	0	0	0	0	0	0	0	0	0	0	0	
–	RB	Argentina	Fabricio Alvarenga	0	0	0	0	0	0	0	0	0	0	0	0	
–	LW	Argentina	Yamil Asad	0	0	0	0	0	0	0	0	0	0	0	0	
–	CF	Argentina	Luis Amarilla	0	0	0	0	0	0	0	0	0	0	0	0	
–	CB	Argentina	Emiliano Amor	0	0	0	0	0	0	0	0	0	0	0	0	
–	MF	Argentina	Emiliano Bogado	0	0	0	0	0	0	0	0	0	0	0	0	
–	RW	Argentina	Ramiro Cáseres	0	0	0	0	0	0	0	0	0	0	0	0	
–	LW	Argentina	Nicolás Delgadillo	0	0	0	0	0	0	0	0	0	0	0	0	
–	GK	Argentina	Tomás Figueroa	0	0	0	0	0	0	0	0	0	0	0	0	
–	FW	Argentina	Álvaro López	0	0	0	0	0	0	0	0	0	0	0	0	
–	DM	Argentina	Gianluca Mancuso	0	0	0	0	0	0	0	0	0	0	0	0	
–	CF	Uruguay	Jonathan Ramis	0	0	0	0	0	0	0	0	0	0	0	0	
–	CB	Argentina	Ramiro Ríos	0	0	0	0	0	0	0	0	0	0	0	0	
–	CB	Argentina Croatia	Mauricio Toni	0	0	0	0	0	0	0	0	0	0	0	0	
Own goals				—	0	—	0	—	0	—	0	—	0	—	—	—

Statistics accurate as of 31 August 2019.

=== Goalscorers ===
Rank	Pos	No.	Nat	Name	League	Cup	League Cup	Continental	Total	Ref
1	CM	8	Argentina	Nicolás Domínguez	3	0	0	0	3	
2	CF	19	Argentina	Maximiliano Romero	1	0	0	0	1	
2	LW	11	Argentina	Lucas Janson	1	0	0	0	1	
2	CM	16	Argentina	Lucas Robertone	1	0	0	0	1	
Own goals					1	0	0	0	0	
Totals					7	0	0	0	7	—
