= Cáseres =

Cáseres is a surname. Notable people with the surname include:

- Facundo Cáseres (born 2001), Argentine footballer
- Ramiro Cáseres (born 1994), Argentine footballer
- Santiago Cáseres (born 1997), Argentine footballer
