= Ramiro Ríos =

Argentine professional footballer

Personal information
- Full name: Ramiro Alexis Ríos
- Date of birth: 7 November 1995 (age 31)
- Place of birth: San Antonio de Padua, Argentina
- Height: 1.84 m (6 ft 0 in)
- Position: Centre-back

Team information
- Current team: Atlético

Youth career
- Vélez Sarsfield

Senior career*
Years	Team	Apps	(Gls)
2015–2019	Vélez Sarsfield	0	(0)
2017	→ Universidad San Martín (loan)	29	(2)
2018–2019	→ UAI Urquiza (loan)	13	(1)
2019–2020	UAI Urquiza	10	(1)
2020–2021	Chacarita Juniors	17	(2)
2022–2023	Comunicaciones	56	(1)
2024	Güemes	32	(1)
2025–2026	Almagro	15	(1)
2026–	Atlético	1	(1)
- * Club domestic league appearances and goals as of 02:39, 20 March 2026 (UTC)

Ramiro Alexis Ríos (born 7 November 1995) is an Argentine professional footballer who plays as a centre-back for Ecuadorian Serie B club Atlético.

== Career ==
Ríos came through the Vélez Sarsfield youth system. He was twice an unused substitute in Primera División action in the 2015 season, though never made it on to the field of play. In January 2017, Ríos completed a twelve-month loan move to Peruvian Primera División side Universidad San Martín. His first appearance arrived on 4 February versus Alianza Atlético, which preceded the centre-back receiving a red card in his third senior match against Sporting Cristal on 19 February. Whilst in Peru, as he featured twenty-nine times, Ríos scored goals in fixtures with Melgar and Comerciantes Unidos.

Ríos returned to Vélez Sarsfield in January 2018, but was loaned out against six months later to UAI Urquiza in Primera B Metropolitana. He scored on debut for the club, netting in a one-nil win over Defensores Unidos on 19 August. Twelve further league games followed for him in the third tier, as they secured a ninth-place finish.

== Career statistics ==
As of 17 June 2019.

Appearances and goals by club, season and competition
Club	Season	League			Cup		League Cup		Continental		Other		Total	
Club	Season	Division	Apps	Goals	Apps	Goals	Apps	Goals	Apps	Goals	Apps	Goals	Apps	Goals
Vélez Sarsfield	2015	Argentine Primera División	0	0	0	0	—		—		0	0	0	0
Vélez Sarsfield	2016	Argentine Primera División	0	0	0	0	—		—		0	0	0	0
Vélez Sarsfield	2016–17	Argentine Primera División	0	0	0	0	—		—		0	0	0	0
Vélez Sarsfield	2017–18	Argentine Primera División	0	0	0	0	—		—		0	0	0	0
Vélez Sarsfield	2018–19	Argentine Primera División	0	0	0	0	0	0	—		0	0	0	0
Vélez Sarsfield	2019–20	Argentine Primera División	0	0	0	0	0	0	0	0	0	0	0	0
Vélez Sarsfield	Total		0	0	0	0	0	0	0	0	0	0	0	0
Universidad San Martín (loan)	2017	Peruvian Primera División	29	2	—		—		—		0	0	29	2
UAI Urquiza (loan)	2018–19	Primera B Metropolitana	13	1	1	0	—		—		0	0	14	1
Career total			42	3	1	0	0	0	0	0	0	0	43	3
