= Damián Fernández =

Argentine footballer

Personal information
- Full name: Damián Ariel Fernández
- Date of birth: 2 January 2002 (age 24)
- Place of birth: Merlo, Argentina
- Height: 1.80 m (5 ft 11 in)
- Position: Centre-back

Team information
- Current team: Defensa y Justicia
- Number: 29

Youth career
- Defensores de la Ribera
- Racing Club
- 2015–2019: Vélez Sarsfield

Senior career*
Years	Team	Apps	(Gls)
2019–2025	Vélez Sarsfield	60	(2)
2025–	Defensa y Justicia	27	(0)

International career
2019	Argentina U18		
- * Club domestic league appearances and goals as of 17:54, 10 May 2026 (UTC)

Damián Ariel Fernández (born 2 January 2002) is an Argentine professional footballer who plays as a centre-back for Defensa y Justicia.

== Club career ==
Fernández joined the youth system of Vélez Sarsfield in 2015 from Trelew-based Racing Club, who he signed for from Defensores de la Ribera. His move into their senior set-up arrived ahead of the 2019–20 campaign. He made his professional debut on 31 August 2019 in a Primera División fixture with Estudiantes, as the centre-back came off the bench in the second half to replace Cristian Núñez in a one-goal victory.

In July 2025, Fernández joined Defensa y Justicia, signing a contract until the end of 2029.

== International career ==
In May 2019, Fernández was selected to train against Argentina's seniors during the Copa América. In the following months, Fernández appeared with the U18s at the L'Alcúdia International Tournament in Spain.

== Career statistics ==
As of 1 September 2019.

Appearances and goals by club, season and competition
Club	Season	League			Cup		League Cup		Continental		Other		Total	
Club	Season	Division	Apps	Goals	Apps	Goals	Apps	Goals	Apps	Goals	Apps	Goals	Apps	Goals
Vélez Sarsfield	2019–20	Primera División	1	0	0	0	0	0	0	0	0	0	1	0
Career total			1	0	0	0	0	0	0	0	0	0	1	0

== Honours ==
Vélez Sarsfield

- Argentine Primera División: 2024
