= Rodolfo Combe =

Uruguayan footballer (born 1995)

Personal information
- Full name: Rodolfo Combe Arriola
- Date of birth: 4 January 1995 (age 31)
- Place of birth: Carmelo, Uruguay
- Height: 1.81 m (5 ft 11 in)
- Position: Forward

Team information
- Current team: Deportivo Español

Youth career
- 2006–2015: Vélez Sarsfield

Senior career*
Years	Team	Apps	(Gls)
2015–2018	Vélez Sarsfield	0	(0)
2016–2017	→ Fénix (loan)	7	(1)
2018–	Deportivo Español	14	(0)
- * Club domestic league appearances and goals as of 20:24, 19 May 2019 (UTC)

Rodolfo Combe Arriola (born 4 January 1995) is a Uruguayan professional footballer who plays as a forward for Deportivo Español.

== Club career ==
Combe, having left Uruguay aged eleven, began his career in Argentina with Vélez Sarsfield. He never made a senior appearance for the club, though was on the substitutes bench for Primera División fixtures with Atlético de Rafaela and Colón in August 2015; as well as in the Copa Argentina versus Acassuso. On 22 July 2016, Combe was loaned to Primera B Metropolitana's Fénix. His professional debut came in a loss to Platense on 4 September, on the way to seven total appearances for them; with his first goal coming in his last match, versus Colegiales in October. Despite no further games, he remained with Fénix until June 2017.

In August 2018, Combe switched Vélez Sarsfield for Deportivo Español; in a permanent deal. Fourteen appearances followed across the 2018–19 campaign as they suffered relegation.

== International career ==
In December 2014, Combe was selected for Fabián Coito's preliminary squad ahead of the 2015 South American U-20 Championship; though he wasn't picked for the final tournament.

== Career statistics ==
As of 19 May 2019.

Appearances and goals by club, season and competition
Club	Season	League			Cup		League Cup		Continental		Other		Total	
Club	Season	Division	Apps	Goals	Apps	Goals	Apps	Goals	Apps	Goals	Apps	Goals	Apps	Goals
Vélez Sarsfield	2015	Primera División	0	0	0	0	—		—		0	0	0	0
Vélez Sarsfield	2016	Primera División	0	0	0	0	—		—		0	0	0	0
Vélez Sarsfield	2016–17	Primera División	0	0	0	0	—		—		0	0	0	0
Vélez Sarsfield	2017–18	Primera División	0	0	0	0	—		—		0	0	0	0
Vélez Sarsfield	Total		0	0	0	0	—		—		0	0	0	0
Fénix (loan)	2016–17	Primera B Metropolitana	7	1	0	0	—		—		0	0	7	1
Deportivo Español	2018–19	Primera B Metropolitana	14	0	0	0	—		—		0	0	14	0
Career total			21	1	0	0	—		—		0	0	21	1
