= Tomás Guidara =

Argentine footballer

Personal information
- Full name: Tomás Ezequiel Guidara
- Date of birth: 13 March 1996 (age 30)
- Place of birth: Córdoba, Argentina
- Height: 1.73 m (5 ft 8 in)
- Position: Right-back

Team information
- Current team: Lanús
- Number: 33

Youth career
- 2012–2017: Belgrano

Senior career*
Years	Team	Apps	(Gls)
2017–2019	Belgrano	44	(0)
2019–2025	Vélez Sarsfield	112	(0)
2025–2026	Huracán	31	(0)
2026–	Lanús	15	(0)
- * Club domestic league appearances and goals as of 17:22, 6 June 2026 (UTC)

Tomás Ezequiel Guidara (born 13 March 1996) is an Argentine professional footballer who plays as a right-back for Lanús.

== Club career ==
Guidara's career started with Belgrano at the age of 16 in the club's youth system. He signed a professional contract on 12 June 2017, prior to making his first-team debut in the Argentine Primera División on 22 June in a 2–1 win against Newell's Old Boys; he played the full match as he did a week later versus Huracán. Those were his only appearances in 2016–17, while he received his first career red card in the first match of 2017–18 in a defeat to Banfield. Guidara penned a new contract with Belgrano on 26 April 2018. June 2019 saw the right-back agree a move away following 2018–19 relegation, as he signed an agreement with Vélez Sarsfield.

== International career ==
Guidara is eligible to represent both Argentina and Albania.

== Career statistics ==
As of 30 December 2019.

Club statistics
Club	Season	League			Cup		League Cup		Continental		Other		Total	
Club	Season	Division	Apps	Goals	Apps	Goals	Apps	Goals	Apps	Goals	Apps	Goals	Apps	Goals
Belgrano	2016–17	Primera División	2	0	0	0	—		0	0	0	0	2	0
Belgrano	2017–18	Primera División	21	0	1	0	—		—		0	0	22	0
Belgrano	2018–19	Primera División	21	0	2	0	2	0	—		0	0	25	0
Career total			44	0	3	0	2	0	0	0	0	0	49	0
Vélez Sarsfield	2019–20	Primera División	13	0	0	0	—						13	0
Vélez Sarsfield	Total		13	0	0	0	0	0	0	0	0	0	13	0
Career total			57	3	0	0	0	0	0	0	0	0	62	3

== Honours ==
Vélez Sarsfield

- Argentine Primera División: 2024

Lanús

- Recopa Sudamericana: 2026
