= Miguel Brizuela =

Argentine footballer

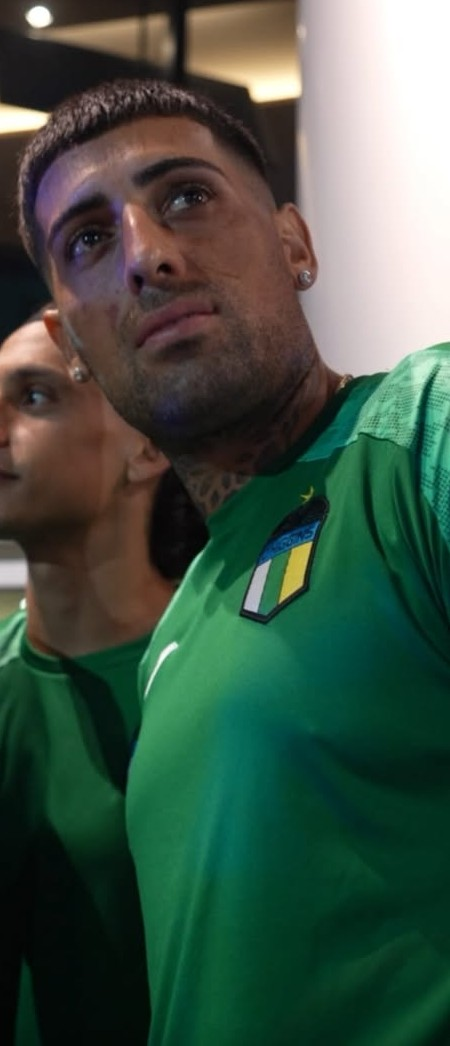
- Brizuela with O'Higgins in 2026.

Personal information
- Full name: Miguel Marcelo Brizuela
- Date of birth: 5 January 1997 (age 29)
- Place of birth: Moreno, Argentina
- Height: 1.81 m (5 ft 11 in)
- Position: Centre-back

Team information
- Current team: O'Higgins
- Number: 33

Youth career
- River Plate
- 2011–2019: Vélez Sarsfield

Senior career*
Years	Team	Apps	(Gls)
2019–2025	Vélez Sarsfield	74	(3)
2024	→ Instituto (loan)	24	(0)
2025	→ Atlético Tucumán (loan)	31	(2)
2026–	O'Higgins	3	(1)
- * Club domestic league appearances and goals as of 3 February 2026

Miguel Marcelo Brizuela (born 5 January 1997) is an Argentine professional footballer who plays as a centre-back for Chilean club O'Higgins.

== Career ==
Brizuela had a short stint with River Plate, prior to penning terms with Vélez Sarsfield's ranks. He is a product of the latter's academy, with their former youth captain making a first-team breakthrough in mid-2019 under manager Gabriel Heinze. His professional debut arrived on 28 July 2019, as the centre-back was selected to start a Primera División fixture away to Talleres; he played fifty-nine minutes, before being subbed off for Pablo Galdames in an eventual 1–0 loss at the Estadio Mario Alberto Kempes. Brizuela scored his first goal on 3 January 2021 against Newell's Old Boys in the Copa de la Liga Profesional.

=== O'Higgins ===
In January 2026, Brizuela ended his contract with Vélez Sarsfield and signed with Chilean club O'Higgins on a deal until December 2027.

== Personal life ==
On 9 February 2021, Brizuela was charged - along with Vélez teammate Thiago Almada - with the rape of a 28-year-old woman; which allegedly occurred at a party on 3 December 2020, which was hosted by teammate Juan Martín Lucero to celebrate Vélez advancing in the Copa Sudamericana. Juan José Acosta Delbene, a former manager of Defensa y Justicia's reserves and Argentino, was initially the only person charged. However, in early February, prosecutor Laura Zyseskind charged initial witnesses Brizuela and Almada; while Delbene was on the run. It is claimed that those two, plus Delbene and an unnamed woman, were involved. Two other women, who were later apprehended, reportedly stole items from the victim.

In response to the charging of Brizuela and Almada, Vélez Sarsfield announced on 9 February that both players had been removed from the first-team until the case was concluded. However, the two players were reincorporated into the senior set-up on 16 February after the club claimed to have received new evidence and further information on the case - though the victim's lawyer, Raquel Hermida Leyenda, stated that nothing had changed in the intervening period. Brizuela played and scored a day later against Deportivo Camioneros in the Copa Argentina.

== Career statistics ==
As of 18 February 2021.

Appearances and goals by club, season and competition
Club	Season	League			Cup		League Cup		Continental		Other		Total	
Club	Season	Division	Apps	Goals	Apps	Goals	Apps	Goals	Apps	Goals	Apps	Goals	Apps	Goals
Vélez Sarsfield	2019–20	Primera División	2	0	0	0	0	0	0	0	0	0	2	0
Vélez Sarsfield	2020–21 (Note: Soccerway counts 2020 Copa de la Liga Profesional appearances as league appearances.)	Primera División	9	1	0	0	0	0	3 (Note: Appearance(s) in the Copa Sudamericana)	0	0	0	12	1
Vélez Sarsfield	2021 (Note: Soccerway counts 2021 Copa de la Liga Profesional appearances as league appearances.)	Primera División	0	0	1	1	—		0	0	0	0	1	1
Career total			11	1	1	1	0	0	3	0	0	0	15	2
