= Nicolás Domínguez =

Argentine footballer

Personal information
- Full name: Nicolás Martín Domínguez
- Date of birth: 28 June 1998 (age 28)
- Place of birth: Haedo, Buenos Aires, Argentina
- Height: 1.79 m (5 ft 10 in)
- Position: Central midfielder

Team information
- Current team: Nottingham Forest
- Number: 8

Senior career*
Years	Team	Apps	(Gls)
2017–2019	Vélez Sarsfield	65	(7)
2019–2023	Bologna	105	(4)
2019–2020	→ Vélez Sarsfield (loan)	10	(2)
2023–	Nottingham Forest	89	(3)

International career
2019–2021	Argentina	11	(1)
Medal record
Men's football
Representing Argentina
Copa América
Winner	2021 Brazil
- * Club domestic league appearances and goals as of 18:30, 18 October 2026 (UTC)

Nicolás Martín Domínguez (Spanish pronunciation: [nikoˈlas ðoˈmiŋɡes]; born 28 June 1998) is an Argentine professional footballer who plays as a central midfielder for Premier League club Nottingham Forest.

== Club career ==
=== Velez Sarfield ===
Domínguez played his first professional game for Vélez Sarsfield in a 3–2 victory against Estudiantes for the 15th fixture of the 2016–17 Argentine Primera División, under Omar De Felippe's coaching. He scored his first goal in a 3–0 victory against Tigre for the 28th fixture of that season.

=== Bologna ===
On 30 August 2019, he signed a contract with Italian club Bologna and was loaned back to Vélez Sarsfield for the rest of 2019. Domínguez made his debut for Bologna as a sub on 12 January in a 1–0 loss away at Torino. He would make his first start for the club on 19 January in a 1–1 home draw against Hellas Verona.

=== Nottingham Forest ===
On 1 September 2023, Domínguez signed with Premier League side Nottingham Forest on a five-year deal in swap deal for Remo Freuler. He made his debut away at Manchester City later that month. On 1 October, Domínguez scored his first goal for Nottingham Forest in a 1–1 draw against Brentford.

== International career ==
Domínguez made his debut for Argentina national team on 5 September 2019 in a friendly against Chile, as a 67th-minute substitute for Rodrigo De Paul.

== Career statistics ==
=== Club ===
As of match played 18 October 2026

Appearances and goals by club, season and competition
Club	Season	League			National cup (Note: Includes Copa Argentina, Coppa Italia, FA Cup)		League cup (Note: Includes Copa de la Superliga, EFL Cup)		Continental		Total	
Club	Season	Division	Apps	Goals	Apps	Goals	Apps	Goals	Apps	Goals	Apps	Goals
Vélez Sarsfield	2016–17	Argentine Primera División	12	1	0	0	—		—		12	1
Vélez Sarsfield	2017–18	Argentine Primera División	24	0	4	0	—		—		28	0
Vélez Sarsfield	2018–19	Argentine Primera División	25	3	1	0	—		—		26	3
Vélez Sarsfield	2019–20	Argentine Primera División	14	5	1	0	3	0	—		18	5
Vélez Sarsfield	Total		75	9	6	0	3	0	—		84	9
Bologna	2019–20	Serie A	16	0	—		—		—		16	0
Bologna	2020–21	Serie A	28	1	2	0	—		—		30	1
Bologna	2021–22	Serie A	28	0	1	1	—		—		29	1
Bologna	2022–23	Serie A	31	3	3	0	—		—		34	3
Bologna	2023–24	Serie A	2	0	1	0	—		—		3	0
Bologna	Total		105	4	7	1	—		—		112	5
Nottingham Forest	2023–24	Premier League	26	2	3	1	—		—		29	3
Nottingham Forest	2024–25	Premier League	34	0	4	0	1	0	—		39	0
Nottingham Forest	2025–26	Premier League	27	1	1	0	0	0	13 (Note: Appearances in UEFA Europa League)	1	41	2
Nottingham Forest	2026–27	Premier League	2	0	0	0	1	0	—		3	0
Nottingham Forest	Total		89	3	8	1	2	0	13	1	112	5
Career total			269	16	21	2	5	0	13	1	308	19

=== International ===
As of match played 16 November 2021

Appearances and goals by national team and year
National team	Year	Apps	Goals
Argentina	2019	5	1
Argentina	2020	3	0
Argentina	2021	3	0
Total		11	1

Scores and results list Argentina's goal tally first, score column indicates score after each Domínguez goal.

List of international goals scored by Nicolás Domínguez
No.	Date	Venue	Opponent	Score	Result	Competition
1	13 October 2019	Estadio Manuel Martínez Valero, Alicante, Spain	Ecuador	5–1	6–1	Friendly

== Honours ==
Argentina

- Copa América: 2021
- Superclásico de las Américas: 2019

=== Individual ===
- Argentine Primera División Best Midfielder: 2018–19
- Argentine Primera División Team of the Year: 2018–19
