= Matías de los Santos (footballer, born 1992) =

Uruguayan professional footballer

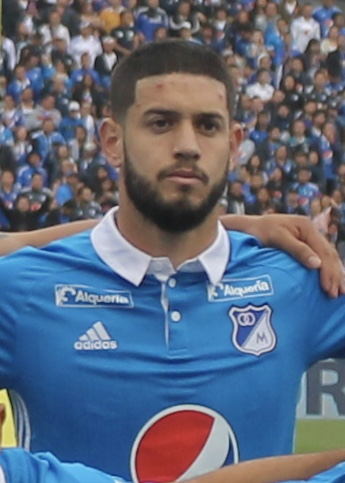

Personal information
- Full name: Matías de los Santos de los Santos
- Date of birth: 22 November 1992 (age 33)
- Place of birth: Salto, Uruguay
- Height: 1.84 m (6 ft 0 in)
- Position: Defender

Team information
- Current team: Nacional

Youth career
- Peñarol
- Almagro Baby Fútbol
- Ferro Carril Salto
- River Plate

Senior career*
Years	Team	Apps	(Gls)
2013–2018	Danubio	70	(3)
2017–2018	→ Millonarios (loan)	34	(2)
2018–2021	Millonarios	51	(4)
2019–2020	→ Vélez Sarsfield (loan)	6	(0)
2021–2024	Vélez Sarsfield	40	(2)
2023	→ Colo-Colo (loan)	6	(0)
2024	Liverpool	11	(0)
2024–2025	Atlético Tucumán	23	(0)
2025–	Nacional	0	(0)
- * Club domestic league appearances and goals as of 17:01, 17 July 2025 (UTC)

Matías de los Santos de los Santos (born 22 November 1992) is an Uruguayan professional footballer who plays as a defender for Nacional.

== Career ==
de los Santos began in the academy of Peñarol, prior to heading off to Almagro Baby Fútbol and Ferro Carril Salto of his hometown. After a further youth stint in the ranks of River Plate, de los Santos' senior career began with Danubio in 2013. He made his pro debut on 25 October in the Primera División, as he came off the bench with fourteen minutes left for Camilo Mayada. In May 2014, de los Santos scored his first goal in a draw with Sud América as Danubio won the 2013–14 title. A total of eighty-three appearances, ten of which arrived in continental competition, came in five years alongside three goals.

On 30 June 2017, de los Santos agreed a loan to Millonarios of Colombia's Categoría Primera A. Two goals came as they won the 2017 Clausura. June 2018 saw Millonarios sign de los Santos permanently. He would move clubs again one year later, though did manage to take his overall tally to eighty-three matches and six goals in the preceding months - winning the 2018 Superliga Colombiana in the process. On 18 July 2019, de los Santos secured a one-year loan move to Argentina with Vélez Sarsfield; with a future purchase option. He made seven total appearances, before returning to Millonarios in June 2020.

However, de los Santos made a return to Vélez Sarsfield in February 2021, signing a deal until the end of 2023. In 2023, he was loaned to Chilean side Colo-Colo.

== Career statistics ==
As of 14 October 2020.

Appearances and goals by club, season and competition
Club	Season	League			Cup		League Cup		Continental		Other		Total	
Club	Season	Division	Apps	Goals	Apps	Goals	Apps	Goals	Apps	Goals	Apps	Goals	Apps	Goals
Danubio	2013–14	Uruguayan Primera División	9	1	—		—		—		3 (Note: Appearance(s) in the Uruguayan Primera División play-offs)	0	12	1
Danubio	2014–15	Uruguayan Primera División	18	0	—		—		7 (Note: Appearance(s) in the Copa Libertadores and Copa Sudamericana)	0	0	0	25	0
Danubio	2015–16	Uruguayan Primera División	16	1	—		—		1 (Note: Appearance(s) in the Copa Sudamericana)	0	0	0	17	1
Danubio	2016	Uruguayan Primera División	13	0	—		—		—		0	0	13	0
Danubio	2017	Uruguayan Primera División	14	1	—		—		2	0	0	0	16	1
Danubio	Total		70	3	—		—		10	0	3	0	83	3
Millonarios (loan)	2017	Categoría Primera A	17	1	3	0	—		0	0	6 (Note: Appearance(s) in the Categoría Primera A play-offs)	1	26	2
Millonarios (loan)	2018	Categoría Primera A	17	1	0	0	—		6 (Note: Appearance(s) in the Copa Libertadores)	0	2 (Note: Appearance(s) in the Superliga Colombiana)	0	25	1
Millonarios	2018	Categoría Primera A	9	0	1	0	—		2	0	0	0	12	0
Millonarios	2019	Categoría Primera A	15	3	2	0	—		—		3	0	20	3
Millonarios	2020	Categoría Primera A	6	0	0	0	—		0	0	0	0	6	0
Millonarios	Total		64	5	6	0	—		8	0	11	1	89	6
Vélez Sarsfield (loan)	2019–20	Argentine Primera División	6	0	0	0	0	0	1	0	0	0	7	0
Career total			140	8	6	0	0	0	19	0	14	1	179	9

== Honours ==
Danubio

- Uruguayan Primera División: 2013–14

Millonarios

- Categoría Primera A: 2017 Clausura
- Superliga Colombiana: 2018
