= Tomás Figueroa =

Argentine footballer (born 1995)

Personal information
- Full name: Tomás Carlos Figueroa
- Date of birth: 20 April 1995 (age 31)
- Place of birth: Buenos Aires, Argentina
- Height: 1.83 m (6 ft 0 in)
- Position: Goalkeeper

Team information
- Current team: Ituzaingó

Youth career
- Villa Luro Norte
- Vélez Sarsfield

Senior career*
Years	Team	Apps	(Gls)
2015–2020	Vélez Sarsfield	0	(0)
2018–2020	→ Deportivo Español (loan)	42	(0)
2020–	Ituzaingó	60	(0)
- * Club domestic league appearances and goals as of 18:54, 17 May 2022 (UTC)

Tomás Carlos Figueroa (born 20 April 1995) is an Argentine professional footballer who plays as a goalkeeper for Ituzaingó.

== Career ==
Figueroa, after joining their academy from Villa Luro Norte, started out with Vélez Sarsfield, with manager Miguel Ángel Russo promoting him into their senior set-up during the 2015 Primera División. In four seasons, he was an unused substitute on eleven occasions - six times in the aforementioned campaign, with the other five arriving in 2016–17. On 30 July 2018, Figueroa completed a loan move to Primera B Metropolitana side Deportivo Español. He made his professional bow with the club in February 2019, featuring for the full duration of a goalless draw with Tristán Suárez.

In September 2020, Figueroa joined Primera C Metropolitana club Ituzaingó. Figueroa helped Ituzaingó with promotion to Primera B Metropolitana for the 2022 season, after a match against Argentino de Merlo that ended in a penalty shootout, where Figueroa's saves sent the team up to Argentina's third best tier.

== Personal life ==
In April 2016, Figueroa contracted dengue virus. He was isolated at home to avoid contagion, before returning to training with Vélez Sarsfield.

== Career statistics ==
As of 20 May 2019.

Appearances and goals by club, season and competition
Club	Season	League			Cup		League Cup		Continental		Other		Total	
Club	Season	Division	Apps	Goals	Apps	Goals	Apps	Goals	Apps	Goals	Apps	Goals	Apps	Goals
Vélez Sarsfield	2015	Primera División	0	0	0	0	—		—		0	0	0	0
Vélez Sarsfield	2016	Primera División	0	0	0	0	—		—		0	0	0	0
Vélez Sarsfield	2016–17	Primera División	0	0	0	0	—		—		0	0	0	0
Vélez Sarsfield	2017–18	Primera División	0	0	0	0	—		—		0	0	0	0
Vélez Sarsfield	2018–19	Primera División	0	0	0	0	—		—		0	0	0	0
Vélez Sarsfield	Total		0	0	0	0	—		—		0	0	0	0
Deportivo Español (loan)	2018–19	Primera B Metropolitana	18	0	0	0	—		—		0	0	18	0
Career total			18	0	0	0	—		—		0	0	18	0
