= Daniel Bazán Vera =

Argentine footballer (born 1973)

Personal information
- Full name: Eduardo Daniel Bazán Vera
- Date of birth: 5 May 1971 (age 55)
- Place of birth: San Justo, Buenos Aires, Argentina
- Height: 1.87 m (6 ft 2 in)
- Position: Forward

Youth career
- Almirante Brown

Senior career*
Years	Team	Apps	(Gls)
1993–1995	Almirante Brown		
1995–1996	Germinal Rawson	29	(11)
1996–1997	Olimpo		(19)
1997–1998	Defensa y Justicia	13	(1)
1998	Santiago Morning	13	(1)
1998–1999	Temperley		
1999–2000	Olimpo		
2000–2001	Almirante Brown		
2001	Atlanta	12	(2)
2002	Almirante Brown		
2002–2003	Inter Turku	21	(0)
2004	Almirante Brown		
2004–2006	Unión Santa Fe	66	(35)
2006–2007	Tristán Suárez		
2007	Almagro	6	(3)
2008	Atlético Rafaela	16	(5)
2008–2009	Temperley		
2009–2011	Almirante Brown		
2011	Gimnasia y Tiro	10	(2)
2012–2013	Tristán Suárez		

Managerial career
- 2016–2019: Tristán Suárez
- 2024: Almirante Brown
- * Club domestic league appearances and goals

Eduardo Daniel Bazán Vera (born 5 May 1973), known as Daniel Bazán Vera, is an Argentine former professional footballer who played as a forward.

== Teams ==
=== Player ===
- (Argentina) Almirante Brown: 1993–1995 (53 goals)
- (Argentina) Club Germinal: 1995–1996 (27 goals)
- (Argentina) Olimpo de Bahía Blanca: 1996–1997 (19 goals)
- (Argentina) Defensa y Justicia: 1997–1998 (18 goals)
- (Chile) Santiago Morning: 1998 (9 goals)
- (Argentina) Temperley: 1998–1999 (21 goals)
- (Argentina) Olimpo de Bahía Blanca: 1999–2000 (21 goals)
- (Argentina) Almirante Brown: 2000–2001 (19 goals)
- (Argentina) Atlanta: 2002 (15 goals)
- (Argentina) Almirante Brown: 2002 (11 goals)
- (Finland) FC Inter Turku: 2002–2003 (0 goals)
- (Argentina) Almirante Brown: 2004 (21 goals)
- (Argentina) Unión de Santa Fe: 2004–2006 (63 goals)
- (Argentina) Tristán Suárez: 2006–2007 (26 goals)
- (Argentina) Almagro: 2007 (11 goals)
- (Argentina) Atlético Rafaela: 2008 (21 goals)
- (Argentina) Temperley: 2008–2009 (5 goals)
- (Argentina) Almirante Brown: 2009–2011 (9 goals)
- (Argentina) Gimnasia y Tiro de Salta: 2011
- (Argentina) Tristán Suárez: 2012–2013

=== Coach ===
- (Argentina) Tristán Suárez: 2016–2019
- (Argentina) Almirante Brown: 2024

== Personal life ==
Bazán Vera's nephew, Nazareno Bazán, is a professional footballer.
