= Joaquín Laso =

Argentine footballer

Personal information
- Full name: Joaquín Marcelo Laso
- Date of birth: 4 July 1990 (age 36)
- Place of birth: Balcarce, Argentina
- Height: 1.85 m (6 ft 1 in)
- Position: Centre-back

Team information
- Current team: Tigre
- Number: 2

Youth career
- 1994–1996: Ferroviarios
- 1996–2005: Racing Club
- 2005–2007: Cadetes
- 2007–2009: Quilmes

Senior career*
Years	Team	Apps	(Gls)
2009–2011	Tigre	0	(0)
2011	Unión Mar del Plata	0	(0)
2012–2013	Huracán	25	(2)
2013–2014	Sportivo Italiano	51	(6)
2015–2017	Argentinos Juniors	58	(0)
2018–2019	Vélez Sarsfield	32	(0)
2019–2020	Atlético San Luis	11	(0)
2020–2021	Rosario Central	27	(2)
2021–2025	Independiente	85	(4)
2025–	Tigre	52	(0)
- * Club domestic league appearances and goals as of 17:45, 9 November 2026 (UTC)

Joaquín Marcelo Laso (born 4 July 1990) is an Argentine professional footballer who plays as a centre-back for Tigre.

== Career ==
Laso had youth spells with Ferroviarios, Racing Club, Cadetes and Quilmes. His senior career started in 2009 with Argentine Primera División team Tigre, he failed to make a first-team appearance in two years and left in 2011 to join Unión Mar del Plata of Torneo Argentino A. However, his spell in Mar del Plata was short as he soon departed. In 2012, Laso joined Torneo Argentino B side Huracán. He went onto make twenty-five appearances and score twice in one season. 2013 saw Laso join Primera C Metropolitana team Sportivo Italiano. Overall, he scored six goals in fifty-one matches; including in his penultimate game versus Acassuso.

On 13 January 2015, Laso completed a move to the Primera División's Argentinos Juniors. He made his top-flight debut in May in a home loss to Aldosivi. Following relegation in 2016, Laso appeared twenty-three times as Argentinos won the 2016–17 Primera B Nacional. On 2 January 2018, Laso joined Vélez Sarsfield on a free transfer. His opening appearance for Vélez came on 27 January versus Defensa y Justicia. After eighteen months with them, Laso departed in June 2019 to Liga MX's Atlético San Luis; his first experience abroad.

== Career statistics ==
As of 19 July 2019.

Club statistics
Club	Season	League			Cup		League Cup		Continental		Other		Total	
Club	Season	Division	Apps	Goals	Apps	Goals	Apps	Goals	Apps	Goals	Apps	Goals	Apps	Goals
Tigre	2009–10	Primera División	0	0	0	0	—		—		0	0	0	0
Tigre	2010–11	Primera División	0	0	0	0	—		—		0	0	0	0
Tigre	Total		0	0	0	0	—		—		0	0	0	0
Unión Mar del Plata	2011–12	Torneo Argentino A	0	0	0	0	—		—		0	0	0	0
Huracán	2012–13	Torneo Argentino B	25	2	0	0	—		—		0	0	25	2
Sportivo Italiano	2013–14	Primera C Metropolitana	33	5	2	0	—		—		0	0	35	5
Sportivo Italiano	2014	Primera B Metropolitana	18	1	1	0	—		—		0	0	19	1
Sportivo Italiano	Total		51	6	3	0	—		—		0	0	54	6
Argentinos Juniors	2015	Primera División	16	0	1	0	—		—		0	0	17	0
Argentinos Juniors	2016	Primera División	10	0	0	0	—		—		0	0	10	0
Argentinos Juniors	2016–17	Primera B Nacional	23	0	1	0	—		—		0	0	24	0
Argentinos Juniors	2017–18	Primera División	9	0	0	0	—		—		0	0	9	0
Argentinos Juniors	Total		58	0	2	0	—		—		0	0	60	0
Vélez Sarsfield	2017–18	Primera División	11	0	0	0	—		—		0	0	11	0
Vélez Sarsfield	2018–19	Primera División	21	0	1	0	3	0	—		0	0	25	0
Vélez Sarsfield	Total		32	0	1	0	3	0	—		0	0	36	0
Atlético San Luis	2019–20	Liga MX	0	0	0	0	—		—		0	0	0	0
Career total			166	8	6	0	3	0	—		0	0	175	8

== Honours ==
Sportivo Italiano

- Primera C Metropolitana: 2013–14

Argentinos Juniors

- Primera B Nacional: 2016–17
