= Emiliano Bogado =

Argentine footballer

Personal information
- Date of birth: 18 November 1997 (age 28)
- Place of birth: Ushuaia, Argentina
- Height: 1.67 m (5 ft 5 1/2 in)
- Position: Forward

Team information
- Current team: Douglas Haig

Youth career
- Vélez Sarsfield

Senior career*
Years	Team	Apps	(Gls)
2015–2020	Vélez Sarsfield	2	(0)
2018–2019	→ Santamarina (loan)	23	(0)
2020–2021	Alvarado	22	(1)
2022	Atlético Paraná	32	(2)
2023–2024	Alvarado	4	(0)
2023	→ Chaco For Ever (loan)	24	(0)
2024–	Douglas Haig	22	(1)
- * Club domestic league appearances and goals as of 17:45, 15 June 2025 (UTC)

Emiliano Bogado (born 18 November 1997) is an Argentine professional footballer who plays as a forward for Douglas Haig.

== Career ==
Bogado began in the system of Vélez Sarsfield. He first made the senior squad in July 2015 when he was an unused substitute on two occasions versus Rosario Central and Olimpo respectively. He eventually made his professional debut on 20 November 2017 during an away defeat against Huracán. That was one of two Primera División matches Bogado featured in during 2017–18. A loan move to Primera B Nacional's Santamarina was confirmed in June 2018. He returned in June 2019 after twenty-three games, with Gabriel Heinze subsequently stating Bogado was the only returning loanee to be reintegrated for pre-season.

In July 2020, having not featured at senior level for over a year, Bogado departed to join Alvarado on a free transfer.

In March 2022, Bogado moved to Torneo Federal A club Atlético Paraná.

== Career statistics ==
As of 12 July 2020.

Club statistics
Club	Season	League			Cup		League Cup		Continental		Other		Total	
Club	Season	Division	Apps	Goals	Apps	Goals	Apps	Goals	Apps	Goals	Apps	Goals	Apps	Goals
Vélez Sarsfield	2015	Primera División	0	0	0	0	—		—		0	0	0	0
Vélez Sarsfield	2016	Primera División	0	0	0	0	—		—		0	0	0	0
Vélez Sarsfield	2016–17	Primera División	0	0	0	0	—		—		0	0	0	0
Vélez Sarsfield	2017–18	Primera División	2	0	0	0	—		—		0	0	2	0
Vélez Sarsfield	2018–19	Primera División	0	0	0	0	0	0	—		0	0	0	0
Vélez Sarsfield	2019–20	Primera División	0	0	0	0	0	0	0	0	0	0	0	0
Vélez Sarsfield	Total		2	0	0	0	0	0	0	0	0	0	2	0
Santamarina (loan)	2018–19	Primera B Nacional	23	0	0	0	—		—		0	0	23	0
Alvarado	2020	Primera B Nacional	0	0	0	0	—		—		0	0	0	0
Career total			25	0	0	0	0	0	0	0	0	0	25	0
