= Nazareno Bazán =

Argentine footballer

Personal information
- Full name: Nazareno Daniel Bazán Vera
- Date of birth: 8 March 1999 (age 27)
- Place of birth: Buenos Aires, Argentina
- Height: 1.84 m (6 ft 1/2 in)
- Position: Forward

Team information
- Current team: Almirante Brown

Youth career
- Vélez Sarsfield

Senior career*
Years	Team	Apps	(Gls)
2017–2022	Vélez Sarsfield	4	(0)
2020	→ Univ. Católica (loan)	26	(7)
2021	→ Luqueño (loan)	7	(2)
2022	→ Tristán Suárez (loan)	6	(0)
2023–2024	Almirante Brown	54	(10)
2024	→ Nacional (loan)	9	(1)
2024	Audax Italiano	2	(0)
2025	Almirante Brown	7	(0)
2025–2026	ADT	16	(4)
2026–	Almirante Brown	2	(0)
- * Club domestic league appearances and goals as of 17:40, 22 April 2026 (UTC)

Nazareno Daniel Bazán Vera (born 8 March 1999) is an Argentine professional footballer who plays as a forward for Almirante Brown.

== Career ==
=== Club ===
Bazán's first club was Vélez Sarsfield. His professional football debut arrived against Lanús on 4 December 2017, midway through the 2017–18 Argentine Primera División campaign which Vélez Sarsfield ended in 14th; with Bazán appearing twice.

=== International ===
In June 2017, Bazán was selected to train with the Argentina national team in Australia and Singapore.

== Personal life ==
Bazán is the nephew of former footballer Daniel Bazán Vera.

== Career statistics ==
As of 27 May 2018.

Club statistics
Club	Season	League			Cup (Note: Includes the Copa Argentina)		League Cup		Continental		Other		Total	
Club	Season	Division	Apps	Goals	Apps	Goals	Apps	Goals	Apps	Goals	Apps	Goals	Apps	Goals
Vélez Sarsfield	2017–18	Primera División	2	0	0	0	—		—		0	0	2	0
Career total			2	0	0	0	—		—		0	0	2	0
