= Rodrigo Salinas (footballer, born 1986) =

Argentine footballer

Personal information
- Full name: Rodrigo Javier Salinas
- Date of birth: 4 July 1986 (age 40)
- Place of birth: La Plata, Argentina
- Height: 1.91 m (6 ft 3 in)
- Position: Forward

Team information
- Current team: Villa San Carlos

Youth career
- Club Evanston

Senior career*
Years	Team	Apps	(Gls)
2004–2009	Villa San Carlos	93	(13)
2009–2014	Godoy Cruz	54	(9)
2011–2012	→ Rosario Central (loan)	7	(0)
2013–2014	→ Unión Santa Fe (loan)	37	(8)
2014–2015	Atlante	10	(2)
2015–2016	Los Andes	28	(4)
2016–2017	Chacarita Juniors	43	(30)
2017	Al-Ettifaq	7	(2)
2018–2020	Vélez Sarsfield	27	(5)
2019	→ Newell's Old Boys (loan)	15	(1)
2020	Deportes La Serena	10	(2)
2021	Sarmiento	11	(0)
2022–2023	Atlético Grau	60	(19)
2024–2025	Chacarita Juniors	43	(5)
2025–2026	Mitre	8	(0)
2026–	Villa San Carlos	7	(2)
- * Club domestic league appearances and goals as of 18:23, 1 April 2026 (UTC)

Rodrigo Javier Salinas (born 4 July 1986) is an Argentine professional footballer who plays as a forward for Villa San Carlos.

== Career ==
Salinas began his senior career in 2004 with Villa San Carlos, he remained with the Primera C club until 2009 and scored a total of thirteen goals in ninety-three matches. Godoy Cruz of the Argentine Primera División signed Salinas in 2009, he scored three goals in his first season including a hat-trick in a 6–2 win over Tigre on 12 April 2010. Overall, he stayed with the club for six seasons and scored nine goals in fifty-four appearances. Whilst with Godoy Cruz, Salinas was loaned out twice to Rosario Central and Unión Santa Fe respectively. He failed to score for Rosario Central but did score eight times for Unión Santa Fe.

In August 2014, Salinas left Argentine football to join Ascenso MX team Atlante. He departed almost a year later following two goals in ten games. He returned to Argentina and subsequently had a two-season spell with Los Andes in Primera B Nacional, prior to signing for fellow second tier club Chacarita Juniors. He went onto score thirty goals in forty-three matches as Chacarita won promotion to the Argentine Primera División. On 17 August 2017, Salinas joined Saudi Professional League side Al-Ettifaq. He scored on his debut in a loss to Al-Qadisiyah on 14 September. One more goal and six more appearances followed.

Salinas mutually terminated his contract with Al-Ettifaq in January 2018, he subsequently agreed to sign for Argentine Primera División team Vélez Sarsfield.

== Career statistics ==
As of 24 May 2018.

Club statistics
Club	Season	League			Cup (Note: Includes the Copa Argentina)		League Cup		Continental		Other		Total	
Club	Season	Division	Apps	Goals	Apps	Goals	Apps	Goals	Apps	Goals	Apps	Goals	Apps	Goals
Vélez Sarsfield	2017–18	Primera División	12	2	0	0	—		—		0	0	12	2
Career total			12	2	0	0	—		—		0	0	12	2
