= Thiago Almada =

Argentine footballer (born 2001)

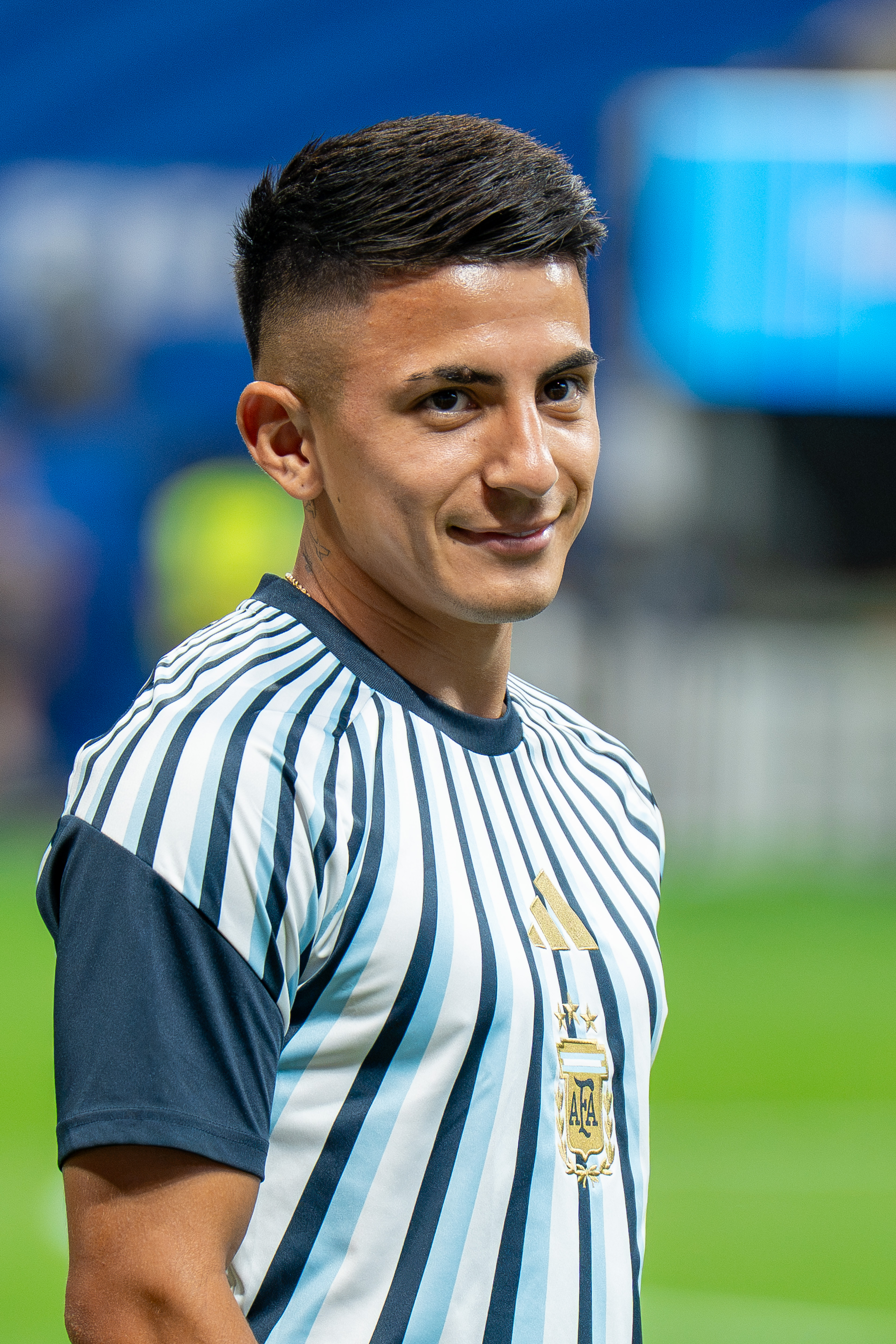
- Almada with Argentina in 2026

Personal information
- Full name: Thiago Ezequiel Almada
- Date of birth: 26 April 2001 (age 25)
- Place of birth: Ciudadela, Buenos Aires, Argentina
- Height: 1.63 m (5 ft 4 in)
- Positions: Attacking midfielder; left midfielder

Team information
- Current team: River Plate
- Number: 23

Youth career
- 2005–2006: Santa Clara
- 2006–2018: Vélez Sarsfield

Senior career*
Years	Team	Apps	(Gls)
2018–2022	Vélez Sarsfield	45	(10)
2022–2024	Atlanta United	77	(23)
2024–2025	Botafogo	17	(1)
2025	→ Lyon (loan)	16	(1)
2025–2026	Atlético Madrid	27	(3)
2026–	River Plate	12	(3)

International career^{‡}
2019	Argentina U20	6	(1)
2021–2024	Argentina Olympic	13	(7)
2022–	Argentina	21	(5)
Medal record
Men's football
Representing Argentina
FIFA World Cup
Winner	2022 Qatar
Runner-up	2026 Canada–Mexico–US
- * Club domestic league appearances and goals as of 5 November 2026 ‡ National team caps and goals as of 12 July 2026

Thiago Ezequiel Almada (born 26 April 2001) is an Argentine professional footballer who plays as an attacking midfielder or left midfielder for Argentine Primera División club River Plate and the Argentina national team.

Almada was a member of the Argentina team that won the 2022 FIFA World Cup, making history by becoming the first active Major League Soccer player to win the tournament. He also won the 2024 Copa Libertadores and the Brazilian Série A with Botafogo.

== Early life ==
Thiago 'Guayo' Ezequiel Almada was born on 26 April 2001, in Ciudadela, Buenos Aires in Argentina. He grew up in the neighborhood Ejército de los Andes, also referred to as Fuerte Apache, which is known for high crime rates and prevalent drug use. Almada spent many of his early years selling fruit and vegetables door-to-door to earn extra money. Much time was spent with his grandparents while his parents worked.

== Club career ==
=== Vélez Sarsfield ===
At the age of four, Almada played football for a local club, Santa Clara. He was picked up by Vélez Sarsfield at age five, where he made his way through the youth academy. On 10 August 2018, just four months after his 17th birthday, Almada made his professional debut against Newell's Old Boys in a 2–0 victory and scored his first two goals on 5 November in the 3–2 loss against Defensa y Justicia, both in the 2018 Argentine Primera División. In October 2018, he was included in The Guardian's "Next Generation 2018".

=== Atlanta United ===
==== Signing and 2022 season ====
On 4 December 2021, Vélez Sarsfield announced that it had reached an agreement with Major League Soccer club Atlanta United for the pre-transfer of Almada in February 2022. The transfer, reportedly worth a league-record $16 million, was officially announced by Atlanta on 9 February 2022. Almada was unveiled in the club's kit the next day in a welcome ceremony held virtually due to the COVID-19 pandemic. His signing was met with scrutiny by Atlanta fans due to the use of a racially insensitive gesture with his eyes during a recent goal celebration; Almada apologized shortly after being asked about the situation.

On 14 February, Almada made his official debut for Atlanta wearing number eight against C.D. Guadalajara during the team's preseason tour of Mexico. Atlanta would end up losing the match 3–0. He made his MLS debut against expansion team Charlotte FC on 15 March as a substitute in Atlanta's 2–1 win. Almada scored his first goal for the club in a 3–3 draw with CF Montréal four days later. The goal won MLS Goal of the Week for Matchday 4.

On November, he was awarded 2022 MLS Newcomer of the Year after being chosen in the MLS Team of the Week five times, including back to back on 12 and 15 September, the second Atlanta United player ever to earn that prize.

==== 2023 season ====
On 25 February 2023, Almada scored two goals (one of which was a free kick) in the first game of the 2023 season, helping Atlanta gain a 2–1 win over San Jose Earthquakes. As a result, Almada was named MLS Player of the Week, as well as being featured in the league's Team of the Matchday.

=== Botafogo ===
On 6 July 2024, Almada officially joined Botafogo, of Campeonato Brasileiro Série A, signing a five-year contract. The deal reportedly commanded a fee of $21 million (€19,5 million) plus $9 million (€7,5 million) in add-ons; in the process, it broke the transfer record both for MLS and Brazilian football. He scored his first goal for Botafogo in a 2–1 win against Corinthians for the Campeonato Brasileiro Série A. In this short stint at Botafogo, Almada conquered the 2024 Campeonato Brasileiro Série A and 2024 Copa Libertadores as one of the key players on the team.

==== Loan to Lyon ====
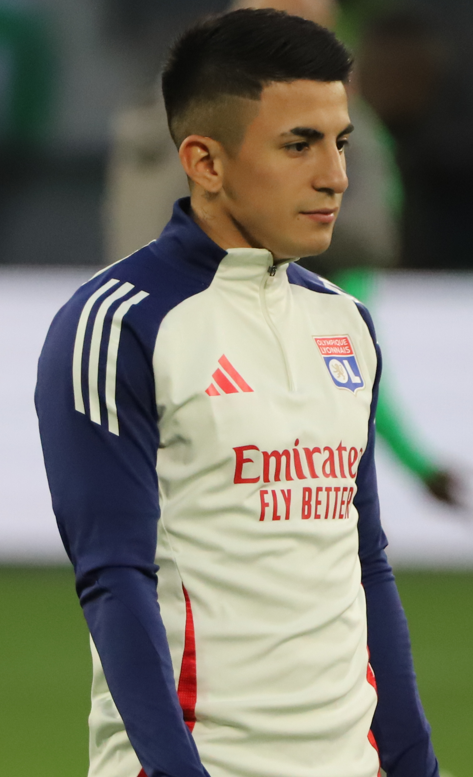
Almada with Lyon in 2025

On 19 December 2024, Almada announced that he would join Ligue 1 side Lyon on 5 January 2025. Lyon announced his arrival on 15 January 2025 as loan deal until 30 June 2025.

=== Atlético Madrid ===
On 15 July 2025, La Liga club Atlético Madrid announced an agreement with Botafogo for the transfer of Almada. Later that year, on 18 October, he scored his first goal for the club in a 1–0 win over Osasuna.

=== River Plate ===
On 8 August 2026, River Plate agreed to sign Almada for a €20 million fee, setting a new record as the most expensive signing in Argentine football history.

== International career ==
Almada played for the Argentina under-20 squad in 2019, before featuring for the under-23 squad in 2021.

His debut in the Argentina national team came on 23 September 2022, in Miami, during a friendly match against Honduras.

In November 2022, Almada was officially called up to the Argentina World Cup squad to replace injured Joaquín Correa, only five days before Argentina's first game of the tournament. He was a member of the squad that ultimately won the tournament, becoming the first active MLS player to win a World Cup. In Argentina's final group stage game, he made his 2022 World Cup debut against Poland. He came on in the 83rd minute as a substitute of Alexis Mac Allister in which Argentina was victorious by 2–0.

On 23 March 2023, Almada scored his first international goal for Argentina at the senior level during a friendly against Panama in his third appearance for the senior team, becoming the first-ever MLS-based player to score for the national team.

Almada competed for Argentina at the 2024 Summer Olympics.

On 27 May 2026, Almada was selected in the 26-man squad for the 2026 FIFA World Cup. On 29 July 2026, FIFA opened disciplinary proceedings against Almada for unsporting behaviour following the violent brawl after Argentina's defeat in the final.

== Personal life ==
Almada was reported for a case of alleged sexual abuse after a party in San Isidro, Buenos Aires that occurred on 4 December 2020. A 28-year-old woman stated that she was sexually abused whilst unconscious by Almada, along with Vélez central defender Miguel Brizuela and the former Argentino de Quilmes coach Juan José Acuña Delbene in a house rented by Juan Martín Lucero.

According to the victim's account, which was corroborated by a witness, she went up to one of the rooms in order to have consensual sex with Almada, but drank something that began to make her ill. Then, Brizuela and another woman entered the room and started to do various unconsented sexual acts to her. The victim stated that she had never wanted to include Brizuela, and that the three people continued even though she was screaming that she did not want anything to do with it.

After the investigation became public, his club suspended both him and Miguel Brizuela. A week after Almada was suspended, he was reinstated with the club stating, "substantial modifications were generated by virtue of the incorporation of new evidence, expertise and testimonies."

In February 2021, Almada and Brizuela were charged with sexual abuse with the aggravating circumstances of carnal access and group abuse by prosecutor Laura Zyseskind. Acuña Delbene became a fleeing felon after being charged in December 2020, but was arrested at his home in Quilmes in July 2021, while Almada and Brizuela are still awaiting sentencing by the Argentine court.

Despite the charges, Almada was called up by Lionel Scaloni to play for the Argentine national team in the 2022 FIFA World Cup. This decision sparked controversy in Argentina and led to widespread international criticism of AFA's decisions. The victim's attorney pointed out several irregularities in the case because, according to FIFA and AFA regulations, "a player is not allowed to be part of a national team if the team can certify that he has a pending criminal case."

== Career statistics ==
=== Club ===
As of match played 5 November 2026

Appearances and goals by club, season and competition
Club	Season	League			National cup (Note: Includes Copa Argentina, U.S. Open Cup, Copa do Brasil, Copa del Rey)		League cup (Note: Includes Copa de la Superliga)		Continental		Other		Total	
Club	Season	Division	Apps	Goals	Apps	Goals	Apps	Goals	Apps	Goals	Apps	Goals	Apps	Goals
Vélez Sarsfield	2018–19	Argentine Primera División	16	3	1	0	4	1	—		—		21	4
Vélez Sarsfield	2019–20	Argentine Primera División	22	4	—		1	0	2 (Note: Appearances in Copa Sudamericana)	1	—		25	5
Vélez Sarsfield	2020–21	Argentine Primera División	—		—		—		8	4	—		8	4
Vélez Sarsfield	2021	Argentine Primera División	7	3	—		7	4	6 (Note: Appearances in Copa Libertadores)	2	—		20	9
Vélez Sarsfield	Total		45	10	1	0	12	5	16	7	—		74	22
Atlanta United	2022	MLS	29	6	2	1	—		—		—		31	7
Atlanta United	2023	MLS	31	11	0	0	—		—		4 (Note: Two appearances and one goal in Leagues Cup, two appearances and one goal in MLS Cup playoffs)	2	35	13
Atlanta United	2024	MLS	17	6	0	0	—		—		—		17	6
Atlanta United	Total		77	23	2	1	—		—		4	2	83	26
Botafogo	2024	Série A	17	1	1	0	—		7	2	1 (Note: Appearance in FIFA Intercontinental Cup)	0	26	3
Lyon (loan)	2024–25	Ligue 1	16	1	—		—		4 (Note: Appearances in UEFA Europa League)	1	—		20	2
Atlético Madrid	2025–26	La Liga	27	3	5	1	—		7 (Note: Appearances in UEFA Champions League)	0	1 (Note: Appearance in Supercopa de España)	0	40	4
River Plate	2026	Argentine Primera División	12	3	—		—		2	0	—		14	3
Career total			194	41	9	2	12	5	36	10	6	2	257	60

=== International ===
As of match played 11 July 2026

Appearances and goals by national team and year
National team	Year	Apps	Goals
Argentina	2022	2	0
Argentina	2023	2	1
Argentina	2024	2	1
Argentina	2025	6	2
Argentina	2026	9	1
Total		21	5

Argentina score listed first, score column indicates score after each Almada goal.

List of international goals scored by Thiago Almada
No.	Date	Venue	Cap	Opponent	Score	Result	Competition	Ref.
1	23 March 2023	Estadio Mâs Monumental, Buenos Aires, Argentina	3	Panama	1–0	2–0	Friendly	
2	15 October 2024	Estadio Mâs Monumental, Buenos Aires, Argentina	6	Bolivia	4–0	6–0	2026 FIFA World Cup qualification	
3	21 March 2025	Estadio Centenario, Montevideo, Uruguay	7	Uruguay	1–0	1–0	2026 FIFA World Cup qualification	
4	10 June 2025	Estadio Mâs Monumental, Buenos Aires, Argentina	10	Colombia	1–1	1–1	2026 FIFA World Cup qualification	
5	9 June 2026	Jordan–Hare Stadium, Auburn, United States	16	Iceland	3–0	3–0	Friendly	

== Honours ==
Botafogo

- Campeonato Brasileiro Série A: 2024
- Copa Libertadores: 2024

Atlético Madrid

- Copa del Rey runner-up: 2025–26

Argentina

- FIFA World Cup: 2022; runner-up: 2026

Individual

- MLS Newcomer of the Year: 2022
- MLS All-Star: 2023
- MLS Best XI: 2023
- MLS Player of the Month: February/March 2023
- MLS Young Player of the Year: 2023
- Copa Libertadores Team of the Tournament: 2024
- South American Team of the Year: 2024
