= César Rigamonti =

Argentine footballer

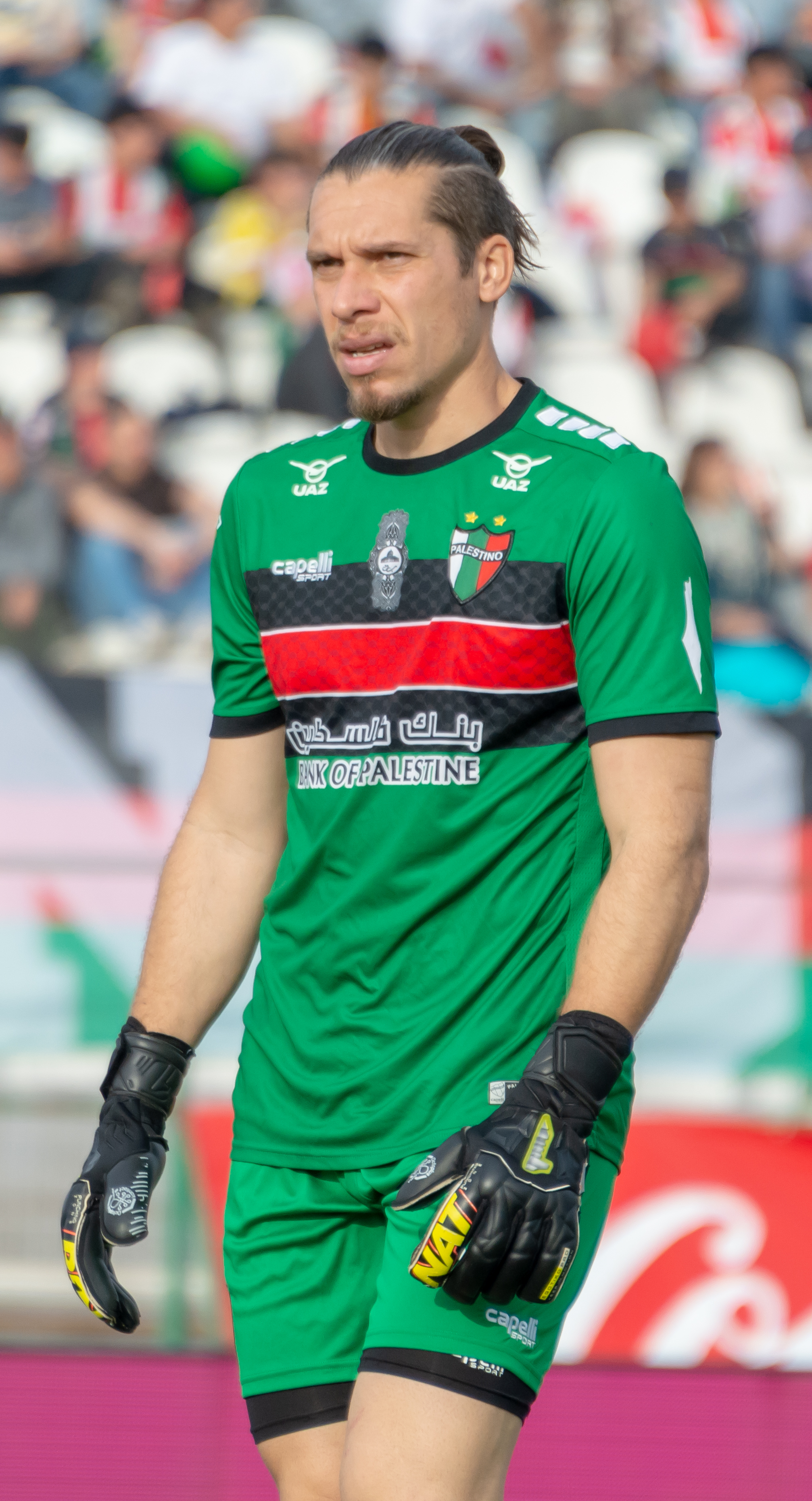
- Rigamonti with Palestino in 2023

Personal information
- Full name: César Pablo Rigamonti
- Date of birth: 7 April 1987 (age 39)
- Place of birth: San Agustín, Argentina
- Height: 1.86 m (6 ft 1 in)
- Position: Goalkeeper

Team information
- Current team: Gimnasia Mendoza
- Number: 23

Youth career
- Belgrano

Senior career*
Years	Team	Apps	(Gls)
2009–2021	Belgrano	63	(0)
2013–2014	→ Sportivo Belgrano (loan)	41	(0)
2014	→ Banfield (loan)	0	(0)
2015	→ Sarmiento (loan)	30	(0)
2016–2017	→ Quilmes (loan)	30	(0)
2017–2018	→ Vélez Sarsfield (loan)	17	(0)
2021–2023	Central Córdoba SdE	35	(0)
2023–2025	Palestino	56	(0)
2025–	Gimnasia Mendoza	27	(0)
Medal record
champion of the Argentinian Football League Second Division after saving 2penalty kicks in the final vs. Deportivo Madryn on October 11,2025 The game finished 1-1 after 90 minutes Gimnasia de Mendoza won 3-0 on penalties
- * Club domestic league appearances and goals as of 16:41, 10 May 2026 (UTC)

César Pablo Rigamonti (born 7 April 1987) is an Argentine professional footballer who plays as a goalkeeper for Gimnasia Mendoza.

== Career ==
Rigamonti made his professional debut on 26 September 2009 in a Primera B Nacional game with Instituto, he was subbed on for the final eight minutes after Juan Carlos Olave received a red card. He got his first start in the following match, a 2–2 draw with Defensa y Justicia. Ten further appearances followed between October 2009 and June 2013, prior to Rigamonti leaving Belgrano, now of the Argentine Primera División, on a temporary basis to join Sportivo Belgrano. He went onto play forty-one times for the club in Primera B Nacional.

In July 2014, Rigamonti agreed to sign for Banfield on loan. He failed to make an appearance throughout the 2014 campaign, but was on the bench for thirteen fixtures in all competitions. After zero appearances for Banfield, Rigamonti joined Sarmiento on loan shortly after arriving back with Belgrano. His debut for Sarmiento came on 15 February 2015 in a 1–4 defeat at home to River Plate. In total, Rigamonti made thirty appearances as Sarmiento finished 24th. He returned to Belgrano for the 2016 season but didn't make an appearance.

Ahead of the 2016–17 Argentine Primera División season, Rigamonti made a loan move to Quilmes. He went onto play in all thirty of Quilmes' league fixtures, in a campaign that ended in relegation to Primera B Nacional. On 3 August 2017, Rigamonti was loaned out for the fifth time as he joined Vélez Sarsfield.

In July 2022, Rigamonti joined Central Córdoba SdE. After a hard collision in a league game against Arsenal de Sarandí on 30 November 2021, Rigamonte suffered three fractured ribs and two cracked ribs.

In December 2022, Rigamonti was announced as the new player of Palestino.

== Career statistics ==
As of 12 September 2018.

Club statistics
Club	Season	League			Cup (Note: Includes the Copa Argentina)		League Cup		Continental (Note: Includes the Copa Sudamericana)		Other		Total	
Club	Season	Division	Apps	Goals	Apps	Goals	Apps	Goals	Apps	Goals	Apps	Goals	Apps	Goals
Belgrano	2009–10	Primera B Nacional	6	0	0	0	—		—		0	0	6	0
Belgrano	2010–11	Primera B Nacional	3	0	0	0	—		—		0	0	3	0
Belgrano	2011–12	Primera División	1	0	3	0	—		—		0	0	4	0
Belgrano	2012–13	Primera División	2	0	0	0	—		—		0	0	2	0
Belgrano	2013–14	Primera División	0	0	0	0	—		0	0	0	0	0	0
Belgrano	2014	Primera División	0	0	0	0	—		—		0	0	0	0
Belgrano	2015	Primera División	0	0	0	0	—		0	0	0	0	0	0
Belgrano	2016	Primera División	0	0	0	0	—		—		0	0	0	0
Belgrano	2016–17	Primera División	0	0	0	0	—		0	0	0	0	0	0
Belgrano	2017–18	Primera División	0	0	0	0	—		—		0	0	0	0
Belgrano	2018–19	Primera División	4	0	0	0	—		—		0	0	4	0
Belgrano	Total		16	0	3	0	—		0	0	0	0	19	0
Sportivo Belgrano (loan)	2013–14	Primera B Nacional	41	0	0	0	—		—		0	0	41	0
Banfield (loan)	2014	Primera División	0	0	0	0	—		—		0	0	0	0
Sarmiento (loan)	2015	Primera División	30	0	0	0	—		—		0	0	30	0
Quilmes (loan)	2016–17	Primera División	30	0	1	0	—		—		0	0	31	0
Vélez Sarsfield (loan)	2017–18	Primera División	17	0	3	0	—		—		0	0	20	0
Career total			134	0	7	0	—		0	0	0	0	141	0
