= Matías Borgogno =

Argentine footballer

Personal information
- Full name: Matías Nahuel Borgogno
- Date of birth: 21 August 1998 (age 28)
- Place of birth: San Francisco, Argentina
- Height: 1.87 m (6 ft 2 in)
- Position: Goalkeeper

Team information
- Current team: Defensa y Justicia (on loan from San Martín SJ)
- Number: 1

Youth career
- Belgrano (SF)
- Sportivo Belgrano
- 2013–2018: Vélez Sarsfield

Senior career*
Years	Team	Apps	(Gls)
2018–2024	Vélez Sarsfield	2	(0)
2023	→ San Martín SJ (loan)	1	(0)
2024–	San Martín SJ	75	(0)
2026	→ Platense (loan)	16	(0)
2026–	→ Defensa y Justicia (loan)	1	(0)
- * Club domestic league appearances and goals as of 17:29, 25 July 2026 (UTC)

Matías Nahuel Borgogno (born 21 August 1998) is an Argentine professional footballer who plays as a goalkeeper for Defensa y Justicia, on loan from San Martín SJ.

== Career ==
Borgogno spent his early years in San Francisco with Belgrano and Sportivo Belgrano, before heading to Buenos Aires with Vélez Sarsfield in 2013. He initially made a competitive senior teamsheet in the 2017–18 campaign, as he went unused for matches against San Martín and Colón under Gabriel Heinze in May 2018. He signed his first professional contract in the succeeding June. He was on the bench a further eight times across the next two years. Borgogno's senior debut arrived on 28 November 2020 in the Copa de la Liga Profesional against Gimnasia y Esgrima, featuring for the full duration of a home loss.

== Career statistics ==
As of 1 December 2020.

Appearances and goals by club, season and competition
Club	Season	League			Cup		League Cup		Continental		Other		Total	
Club	Season	Division	Apps	Goals	Apps	Goals	Apps	Goals	Apps	Goals	Apps	Goals	Apps	Goals
Vélez Sarsfield	2017–18	Primera División	0	0	0	0	—		—		0	0	0	0
Vélez Sarsfield	2018–19	Primera División	0	0	0	0	0	0	—		0	0	0	0
Vélez Sarsfield	2019–20	Primera División	0	0	0	0	0	0	0	0	0	0	0	0
Vélez Sarsfield	2020–21 (Note: Soccerway counts Copa de la Liga Profesional appearances as league appearances.)	Primera División	1	0	0	0	0	0	0	0	0	0	1	0
Career total			1	0	0	0	0	0	0	0	0	0	1	0
