= Cristian Núñez (footballer, born 1997) =

Paraguayan footballer

Personal information
- Full name: Cristian David Núñez Morales
- Date of birth: 20 September 1997 (age 29)
- Place of birth: Villa Hayes, Paraguay
- Height: 1.66 m (5 ft 5 1/2 in)
- Position: Central midfielder

Team information
- Current team: Flamurtari
- Number: 22

Youth career
- Los Andes

Senior career*
Years	Team	Apps	(Gls)
2013–2016	Juventud Loma Pytá		
2016–2020	Vélez Sarsfield	2	(0)
2020–2022	Lanús	0	(0)
2021	→ Platense (loan)	2	(0)
2021–2022	→ Sol de América (loan)	39	(0)
2023	Godoy Cruz	30	(0)
2024	Tacuary	5	(0)
2024–2025	Banfield	26	(0)
2025	Yverdon-Sport	5	(0)
2025–	Flamurtari	21	(0)

International career
2020	Paraguay U23	2	(0)
- * Club domestic league appearances and goals as of 13 May 2026

Cristian David Núñez Morales (born 20 September 1997) is a Paraguayan professional footballer who plays as a central midfielder for Albanian Kategoria Superiore club Flamurtari.

== Club career ==
After moving to Argentina at the age of eight, Núñez spent his whole youth career with Los Andes. Aged sixteen, he returned to Paraguay to join Cuarta División side Juventud Loma Pytá. Having debuted at the senior level with them, Núñez headed back to Argentina with Vélez Sarsfield in 2016. He made the step into their first-team in January 2018, as he appeared on the substitute's bench seven times during 2017–18 but went unused. In the club's Primera División finale in that season, Núñez made his debut by coming on as a late substitute for Santiago Cáseres during a 1–1 draw with Argentinos Juniors on home soil.

In September 2020, Núñez terminated his Vélez contract a year early in order to sign with divisional rivals Lanús. His first appearance arrived on 25 November in a Copa Sudamericana round of sixteen first leg encounter with Bolívar, as he featured for the full duration of a 2–1 defeat on his continental debut. On 11 February 2021, after no further matches for Lanús, Núñez was loaned to Primera B Nacional with Platense. In June 2021, Núñez moved to Paraguayan club Sol de América on a one-year loan deal.

On 23 January 2025, Núñez signed a one-and-a-half-year contract with Yverdon-Sport in Switzerland.

== International career ==
In November 2019, Núñez received a call-up to Paraguay's U23 squad for friendlies with Venezuela. Months later, Núñez made the final squad for the 2020 CONMEBOL Pre-Olympic Tournament in Colombia. He made appearances against Uruguay and Bolivia as they were eliminated at the first stage.

== Career statistics ==
As of 12 February 2021.

Club statistics
Club	Season	League			Cup		League Cup		Continental		Other		Total	
Club	Season	Division	Apps	Goals	Apps	Goals	Apps	Goals	Apps	Goals	Apps	Goals	Apps	Goals
Vélez Sarsfield	2017–18	Primera División	2	0	0	0	—		—		0	0	2	0
Vélez Sarsfield	2018–19	Primera División	0	0	0	0	0	0	—		0	0	0	0
Vélez Sarsfield	2019–20	Primera División	0	0	0	0	0	0	0	0	0	0	0	0
Vélez Sarsfield	Total		2	0	0	0	0	0	0	0	0	0	2	0
Lanús	2020–21	Primera División	0	0	0	0	0	0	1 (Note: Appearance(s) in the Copa Sudamericana)	0	0	0	1	0
Platense (loan)	2020–21	Primera División	0	0	0	0	—		—		0	0	0	0
Career total			2	0	0	0	0	0	1	0	0	0	3	0
