= Gonzalo Rodríguez (footballer, born 1997) =

Argentine professional footballer

Personal information
- Full name: Gonzalo Ezequiel Rodríguez
- Date of birth: 4 October 1997 (age 29)
- Place of birth: Buenos Aires
- Height: 1.74 m (5 ft 9 in)
- Position: Midfielder

Senior career*
Years	Team	Apps	(Gls)
2017-19	Velez Sarsfield	1	(0)
2019	Cañuelas Fútbol Club	10	(0)
- * Club domestic league appearances and goals as of 00:15, 13 September 2022 (UTC)

Gonzalo Ezequiel Rodriguez (born 4 October 1997) is an Argentine former professional footballer who played as a central midfielder for Club Atlético Vélez Sarsfield.

Rodriguez made his debut for Velez Sarsfield in the Argentine Primera División on April 21, 2018, against Temperley coming on a substitute for Mauro Zárate.
