= Maximiliano Romero =

Argentine footballer (born 1999)

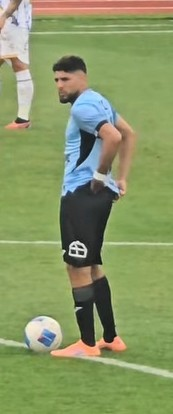

Personal information
- Full name: Maximiliano Samuel Romero
- Date of birth: 9 January 1999 (age 27)
- Place of birth: Moreno, Buenos Aires, Argentina
- Height: 1.79 m (5 ft 10 in)
- Position: Forward

Team information
- Current team: Colo-Colo (on loan from Argentinos Juniors)

Youth career
- 2005–2015: Vélez Sarsfield

Senior career*
Years	Team	Apps	(Gls)
2015–2017	Vélez Sarsfield	40	(9)
2018–2023	PSV	12	(1)
2018–2023	Jong PSV	19	(7)
2019–2020	→ Vélez Sarsfield (loan)	22	(7)
2022–2023	→ Racing Club (loan)	50	(6)
2024	Racing Club	0	(0)
2024–	Argentinos Juniors	39	(10)
2025	→ O'Higgins (loan)	13	(7)
2026–	→ Colo-Colo (loan)	17	(8)

International career
2019	Argentina U20	6	(2)
- * Club domestic league appearances and goals as of 3 January 2026

Maximiliano Samuel Romero (born 9 January 1999) is an Argentine professional footballer who plays as a centre forward for Chilean club Colo-Colo on loan from Argentinos Juniors.

== Club career ==
=== Velez Sarsfield ===
Before making his professional debut, the Argentine forward was close to being transferred to English side Arsenal, for a reported €6 million fee. However, after suffering a knee cruciate ligament injury in a reserves game in 2015 he stayed with Vélez. Again in 2016 Arsenal were rumoured to be interested in Romero, however nothing came of it.

Romero debuted for Vélez at age 17, entering the field in a 0–1 defeat to Sarmiento for the first fixture of the 2016 Argentine Primera División. He also entered the field in the 2–1 victory against Olimpo for the following fixture, in which he scored his first professional goal. He finished his first professional season with 11 appearances (five as a starter) and three goals. During the 2016–17 Argentine Primera División, Romero was mainly a substitute for Mariano Pavone. He managed to score two goals in 19 games (seven starts).

The forward had a successful start to the 2017–18 Argentine Primera División, scoring a double in each of the first two games of the season (3–0 and 2–0 victories against Tigre and Atlético Tucumán, respectively). He also assisted Federico Andrada to score the winning goal in the team's victory against Aldosivi for the round of 32 of the 2016–17 Copa Argentina.

=== PSV Eindhoven ===
On 21 December 2017, PSV Eindhoven announced Romero would join the club in the January transfer window. The Dutch team signed Romero for €10.5 million and he signed a 5 1/2-year deal. Romero was officially presented as a PSV player on 16 January and the club confirmed he would wear the number 22 shirt. It was later announced, that the deal only was a six-month loan deal, followed by a permanent contract from the summer of 2018. Romero was part of the PSV squad that won the Dutch Eredivisie in the 2017–18 season. However, due to multiple injuries and the birth of his son, he did not make a single appearance.

Romero made his first PSV appearance on 11 August 2018, coming on as a substitute against Utrecht. His next appearance did not come until 28 November in the Champions League which was again as a substitute, against FC Barcelona. PSV lost the game 2–1 and were eliminated from the competition's group stage.

In July 2019, he was sent back on loan to Vélez Sarsfield.

=== Return to Argentina ===
On 25 June 2022, Romero extended his contract with PSV until 30 June 2024 and joined Racing Club on a season-long loan. The transfer was made permanent on 1 January 2024. Six days later, he signed a loan deal with Argentinos Juniors until 31 December 2025, under the productivity-based contractual scheme, with an option to purchase 50% of the player's rights.

==== O'Higgins (loan) ====
On 25 July 2025, Romero joined Chilean club O'Higgins from Argentinos Juniors on a loan until the end of 2025.

==== Colo-Colo (loan) ====
On 17 January 2026, Romero joined Chilean giant Colo-Colo on a one-year loan with an option to buy.

== Personal life ==
On 21 March 2018, Romero's partner Florencia Salazar gave birth to the couple's first child, Benjamín.

== Career statistics ==
As of match played 4 December 2017

Appearances and goals by club, season and competition
Club	Season	League			National Cup		Continental		Other		Total	
Club	Season	Division	Apps	Goals	Apps	Goals	Apps	Goals	Apps	Goals	Apps	Goals
Vélez Sarsfield	2016	Primera División	11	3	2	0	0	0	0	0	13	3
Vélez Sarsfield	2016–17	Primera División	19	2	4	0	0	0	0	0	23	2
Vélez Sarsfield	2017–18	Primera División	10	4	0	0	0	0	0	0	10	4
Vélez Sarsfield	Total		40	9	6	0	0	0	0	0	46	9
PSV	2017–18	Eredivisie	1	0	0	0	1	0	0	0	2	0
O'Higgins	2025	Liga de Primera	10	6	0	0	0	0	0	0	10	6
Career total			91	24	12	0	1	0	0	0	104	24

== Honours ==
PSV

- KNVB Cup: 2021–22

Racing Club

- Trofeo de Campeones de la Liga Profesional: 2022
