= Mauricio Toni =

Argentina football player

Personal information
- Date of birth: 9 March 1998 (age 28)
- Place of birth: Comodoro Rivadavia, Argentina
- Height: 1.85 m (6 ft 1 in)
- Position: Centre-back

Youth career
- CAI
- River Plate
- Vélez Sarsfield

Senior career*
| Years | Team | Apps | (Gls) |
| 2017–2021 | Vélez Sarsfield | 2 | (0) |
| 2018–2019 | → Talleres (loan) | 2 | (0) |
| 2019 | → Alvarado (loan) | 0 | (0) |
| 2020 | → Deportivo Armenio (loan) | 8 | (0) |
- * Club domestic league appearances and goals

Mauricio Toni (born 9 March 1998) is a retired Argentine-Croatian professional footballer who played as a centre-back.

== Club career ==
CAI, River Plate and Vélez Sarsfield were youth teams of Toni. The latter became Toni's first senior club in 2017. He made his professional bow in the Argentine Primera División during 2016–17, appearing in the second half of a 0–3 defeat of Tigre on 3 June 2017. Toni completed a season-long loan move to Talleres in August 2018. Just two appearances followed. July 2019 saw Toni loaned to Primera B Nacional with Alvarado. However, the defender ended his stay there in the succeeding January after not appearing competitively. A further loan move to Deportivo Armenio was soon completed.

Toni participated in eight Primera B Metropolitana matches for Armenio, prior to returning to his parent club midway through 2020.

On 21 February 2021, Toni got his contract with Vélez Sarsfield terminated by mutual agreement. In August 2021 it was confirmed, that 23-year old Toni had decided to retire from football.

== International career ==
Toni previously received a call-up to Croatia's U21s.

== Career statistics ==
As of 24 October 2020.

Club statistics
| Club | Season | League | | | Cup | | League Cup | | Continental | | Other | | Total | |
| Club | Season | Division | Apps | Goals | Apps | Goals | Apps | Goals | Apps | Goals | Apps | Goals | Apps | Goals |
|---|---|---|---|---|---|---|---|---|---|---|---|---|---|---|
| Vélez Sarsfield | 2016–17 | Primera División | 1 | 0 | 0 | 0 | — | | — | | 0 | 0 | 1 | 0 |
| Vélez Sarsfield | 2017–18 | Primera División | 1 | 0 | 0 | 0 | — | | — | | 0 | 0 | 1 | 0 |
| Vélez Sarsfield | 2018–19 | Primera División | 0 | 0 | 0 | 0 | 0 | 0 | — | | 0 | 0 | 0 | 0 |
| Vélez Sarsfield | 2019–20 | Primera División | 0 | 0 | 0 | 0 | 0 | 0 | 0 | 0 | 0 | 0 | 0 | 0 |
| Vélez Sarsfield | Total | | 2 | 0 | 0 | 0 | 0 | 0 | 0 | 0 | 0 | 0 | 2 | 0 |
| Talleres (loan) | 2018–19 | Primera División | 2 | 0 | 0 | 0 | 0 | 0 | 0 | 0 | 0 | 0 | 2 | 0 |
| Alvarado (loan) | 2019–20 | Primera B Nacional | 0 | 0 | 0 | 0 | — | | — | | 0 | 0 | 0 | 0 |
| Deportivo Armenio (loan) | 2019–20 | Primera B Metropolitana | 8 | 0 | 0 | 0 | — | | — | | 0 | 0 | 8 | 0 |
| Career total | | | 12 | 0 | 0 | 0 | 0 | 0 | 0 | 0 | 0 | 0 | 12 | 0 |
