= Favio Durán =

Argentine footballer

Personal information
- Full name: Favio Alejandro Durán
- Date of birth: 24 November 1995 (age 30)
- Place of birth: Puerto Madryn, Argentina
- Height: 1.78 m (5 ft 10 in)
- Position: Centre forward

Team information
- Current team: Olmedo
- Number: 33

Senior career*
Years	Team	Apps	(Gls)
2016–2019	Vélez Sarsfield	2	(0)
2017–2018	→ Villa Dálmine (loan)	15	(2)
2019–	Olmedo	11	(1)
- * Club domestic league appearances and goals as of 21:10, 24 May 2019 (UTC)

Favio Alejandro Durán (born 24 November 1995) is an Argentine footballer who plays for Olmedo.
