= Álvaro López (Argentine footballer) =

Argentine professional footballer

Personal information
- Date of birth: 6 August 1998 (age 28)
- Place of birth: Neuquén, Argentina
- Height: 1.95 m (6 ft 5 in)
- Position: Striker

Team information
- Current team: Albion (on loan from Plaza Colonia)
- Number: 9

Youth career
- ACDC Patagonia
- Vélez Sarsfield

Senior career*
Years	Team	Apps	(Gls)
2018–2021	Almirante Brown	55	(6)
2022	Boston River	18	(3)
2023–2024	Almirante Brown	8	(0)
2023	→ San Miguel (loan)	10	(1)
2024	→ Argentino de Quilmes (loan)	33	(5)
2025	Universidad de Concepción	8	(1)
2025–	Plaza Colonia	11	(4)
2026–	→ Albion (loan)	25	(14)
- * Club domestic league appearances and goals as of 6 September 2026

Álvaro López (born 6 August 1998) is an Argentine professional footballer who plays as a striker for Uruguayan club Albion on loan from Plaza Colonia.

== Career ==
López came through the youth systems of ACDC Patagonia and Vélez Sarsfield. In June 2018, López joined Primera B Metropolitana's Almirante Brown on a season-long deal. He made his bow on 1 September versus All Boys, an opponent he later scored his first senior goal against in the succeeding February.

In January 2022, López joined Uruguayan club Boston River.

In 2025, López moved to Chile and joined Universidad de Concepción on a one-year loan from Almirante Brown.

== Career statistics ==
As of 26 April 2019.

Appearances and goals by club, season and competition
Club	Season	League			Cup		League Cup		Continental		Other		Total	
Club	Season	Division	Apps	Goals	Apps	Goals	Apps	Goals	Apps	Goals	Apps	Goals	Apps	Goals
Vélez Sarsfield	2018–19	Primera División	0	0	0	0	0	0	—		0	0	0	0
Almirante Brown (loan)	2018–19	Primera B Metropolitana	8	1	0	0	—		—		0	0	8	1
Career total			8	1	0	0	0	0	—		0	0	8	1
