= Gianluca Mancuso =

Argentine footballer

Personal information
- Full name: Gianluca Mancuso
- Date of birth: 3 February 1998 (age 28)
- Place of birth: Buenos Aires, Argentina
- Height: 1.79 m (5 ft 10 in)
- Position: Defensive midfielder

Team information
- Current team: Central Norte

Youth career
- Vélez Sarsfield

Senior career*
Years	Team	Apps	(Gls)
2017–2021	Vélez Sarsfield	2	(0)
2018–2019	→ Foggia (loan)	0	(0)
2019–2020	→ Valladolid B (loan)	19	(1)
2021	La Nucía	11	(0)
2021–2022	Cornellà	36	(0)
2022–2023	Badajoz	29	(0)
2023–2024	Steaua Bucuresti	20	(0)
2025	Orihuela	14	(0)
2025–	Central Norte	24	(1)

International career
2013	Argentina U-15	5	(0)
2015	Argentina U-17	10	(0)
- * Club domestic league appearances and goals as of 17:24, 24 April 2026 (UTC)

Gianluca Mancuso (born 3 February 1998) is an Argentine professional footballer who plays as midfielder for Central Norte.

== Club career ==
Mancuso made his professional debut for Vélez Sarsfield starting in a 1–0 victory against Olimpo, for the 2016–17 Argentine Primera División. After spending 2018–19 on loan in Italy's Serie B without featuring for Foggia, Mancuso was again loaned out in August 2019 to La Liga side Valladolid; penning for two years.

In January 2025, Mancuso joined Orihuela.

== International career ==
The midfielder took part in the Argentina national under-15 football team (for the 2013 South American Championship) and the Argentina national under-17 football team (for the 2015 South American Under-17 Football Championship).

== Personal life ==
Gianluca is the son of former Argentine international Alejandro Mancuso.
