= Emiliano Amor =

Syrian footballer (born 1995)

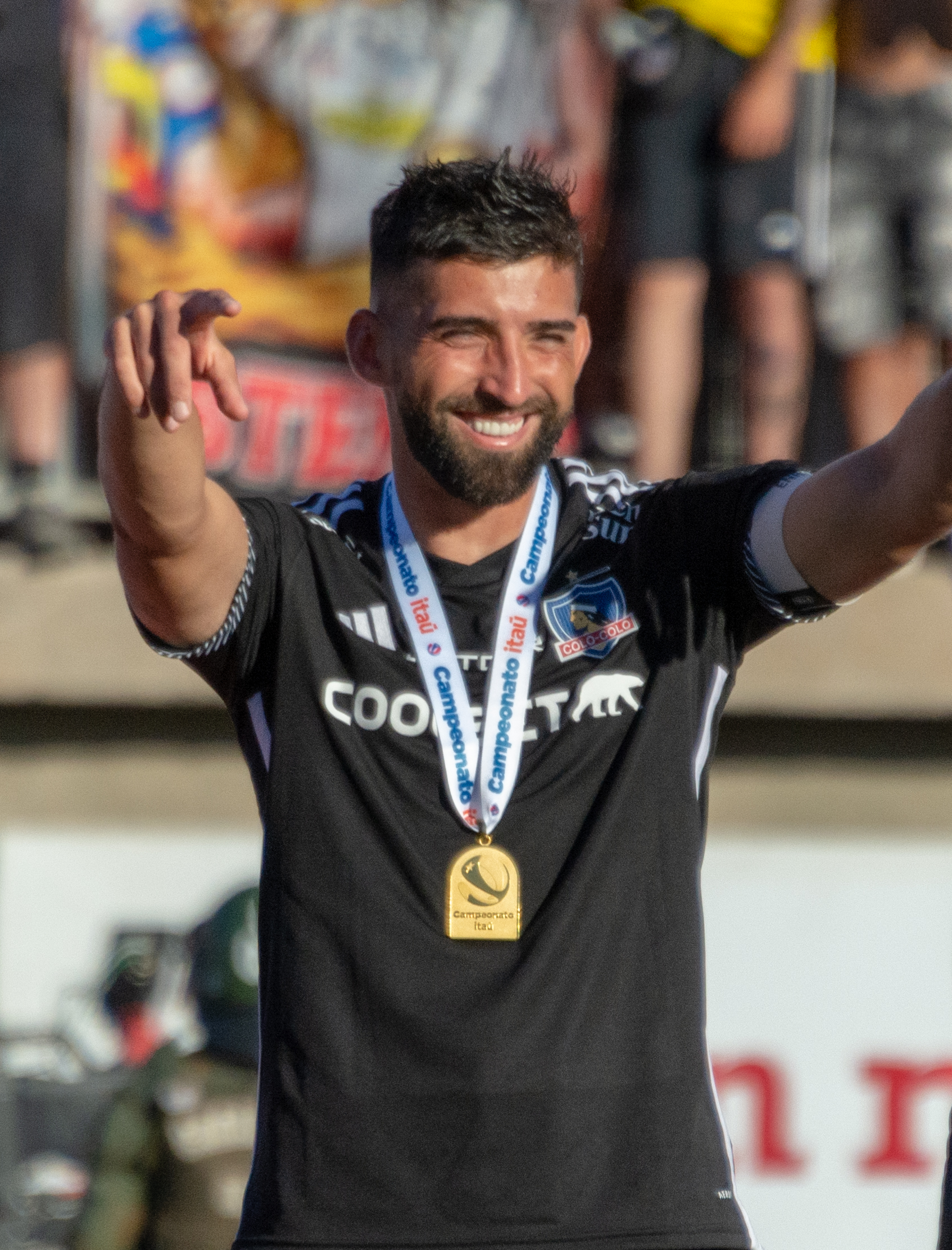
- Amor with Colo-Colo in 2024

Personal information
- Full name: Emiliano Javier Amor
- Date of birth: 16 May 1995 (age 31)
- Place of birth: Buenos Aires, Argentina
- Height: 1.90 m (6 ft 3 in)
- Position: Centre-back

Team information
- Current team: San Lorenzo
- Number: 19

Youth career
- Vélez Sarsfield

Senior career*
Years	Team	Apps	(Gls)
2014–2021	Vélez Sarsfield	56	(3)
2018	→ Sporting Kansas City (loan)	5	(0)
2018	→ Swope Park Rangers (loan)	2	(0)
2018–2019	→ Aldosivi (loan)	23	(1)
2019–2020	→ San Martín Tucumán (loan)	16	(3)
2021–2025	Colo Colo	88	(4)
2026	Defensa y Justicia	15	(1)
2026–	San Lorenzo	12	(0)

International career^{‡}
2024–	Syria	3	(0)
- * Club domestic league appearances and goals as of 18:00, 21 November 2026 (UTC) ‡ National team caps and goals as of 19 November 2024

Emiliano Javier Amor (Arabic: ايميليانو خافيير أمور; born 16 May 1995) is a professional footballer who plays as a centre-back for Argentine club San Lorenzo. Born in Argentina, he plays for the Syria national team.

== Club career ==
Under José Oscar Flores' coaching, Amor debuted for Vélez Sarsfield with 18 years of age in the 2014 Argentine Primera División 2–0 victory against Defensa y Justicia. During Miguel Ángel Russo's coaching era, Amor became a regular starter for Vélez' first team during the first half of the 2015 Argentine Primera División, playing 14 goals and scoring twice.

On 18 January 2018, Amor signed on loan with Major League Soccer side Sporting Kansas City for the 2018 MLS season. After loan spells in Aldosivi and San Martín Tucumán, he joined Chilean side Colo-Colo in April 2021. He spent five seasons with them until December 2025.

Back to Argentina, Amor joined Defensa y Justicia in January 2026.

== International career ==
In April 2024, it was reported that Amor would represent the Syrian national team, ahead of the upcoming fixtures during the 2026 FIFA World Cup qualification. Later that year, on 11 June, he started his first international match in a 5–0 away defeat against Japan.
