= Nicolás Delgadillo =

Argentine footballer

Personal information
- Full name: Nicolás Delgadillo Godoy
- Date of birth: 2 October 1997 (age 29)
- Place of birth: Buenos Aires, Argentina
- Height: 1.77 m (5 ft 10 in)
- Positions: Winger; second striker

Team information
- Current team: Deportivo Saprissa
- Number: 32

Youth career
- Vélez Sarsfield

Senior career*
Years	Team	Apps	(Gls)
2015–2022	Vélez Sarsfield	49	(2)
2019	→ San Martín Tucumán (loan)	3	(0)
2019–2021	→ Patronato (loan)	48	(2)
2022	→ Platense (loan)	15	(0)
2023	Rafaela	32	(2)
2024	Colón	20	(0)
2025–	Deportivo Saprissa	16	(2)
- * Club domestic league appearances and goals as of 18 May 2025

Nicolás Delgadillo Godoy (born 2 October 1997) is an Argentine footballer who plays as a left winger for Costa Rican club Deportivo Saprissa.

== Career ==
Delgadillo played youth football in Vélez Sarsfield and started his professional career when he was 17, entering the field in a 0–1 defeat to San Lorenzo de Almagro for the 2015 Argentine Primera División. He scored his first goal in a 1–3 defeat to San Martín de San Juan later on in the tournament. At the end of the season, and despite his team's low performance, Delgadillo was scouted by Spanish powerhouses Real Madrid CF and Valencia CF, although in the end he stayed in Vélez.

On 11 January 2019, Delgadillo was loaned out to San Martín de Tucumán. On 1 August 2019, it was announced that Delgadillo had been loaned out to Patronato. Delgadillo scored his first goal for Patronato on 11 April 2021 during a match against Club de Gimnasia y Esgrima La Plata. After two years at Patronato, Delgadillo was loaned out to Platense for the 2022 season.
