= Ramiro Cáseres =

Argentine footballer

Personal information
- Full name: Ramiro Julián Cáseres
- Date of birth: 9 January 1994 (age 32)
- Place of birth: Ituzaingó, Buenos Aires, Argentina
- Height: 1.66 m (5 ft 5 in)
- Position: Right winger

Team information
- Current team: Defensores de Belgrano

Youth career
- Vélez Sársfield

Senior career*
Years	Team	Apps	(Gls)
2012–2020	Vélez Sársfield	44	(7)
2015	→ Gimnasia Jujuy (loan)	5	(0)
2016	→ Univ. San Martín (loan)	42	(5)
2017	→ Univ. San Martín (loan)	35	(3)
2018–2019	→ Platense (loan)	6	(0)
2020	→ Talleres Remedios (loan)	6	(0)
2022–	Defensores de Belgrano	6	(0)
- * Club domestic league appearances and goals as of 20:18, 18 November 2019 (UTC)

Ramiro Julián Cáseres (born 9 January 1994) is an Argentine footballer who plays as a forward for Defensores de Belgrano.

== Honours ==
Vélez Sársfield

- Argentine Primera División (1): 2012 Inicial, 2012–13 Superfinal
- Supercopa Argentina (1): 2013
