= 2017–18 Club Atlético Vélez Sarsfield season =

Club Atlético Vélez Sarsfield
2017–18 season
- President: Raúl Gamez
- Manager: Omar De Felippe (until 6 November 2017); Marcelo Gómez (int.) (from 6 November 2017 to 9 December 2017); Gabriel Heinze (from 9 December 2017)
- Stadium: José Amalfitani Stadium
- Primera División: 19th
- 2016–17 Copa Argentina: Quarter-finals
- 2017–18 Copa Argentina: Round of 64
- Top goalscorer: League: Maximiliano Romero (4); All: Maximiliano Romero (4)

The 2017–18 season is Club Atlético Vélez Sarsfield's 76th consecutive season in the top-flight of Argentine football. The season covers the period from 1 July 2017 to 30 June 2018.

== Current squad ==
As of 22 August 2017.

Note: Flags indicate national team as defined under FIFA eligibility rules; some limited exceptions apply. Players may hold more than one non-FIFA nationality.

No.	Pos.	Nation	Player
1	GK	ARG	Alan Aguerre
3	DF	ARG	Braian Cufré
4	DF	ARG	Emiliano Amor
5	MF	ARG	Fabián Cubero
6	DF	ARG	Fausto Grillo
10	MF	ARG	Jorge Correa
15	DF	ARG	Fabricio Alvarenga
16	DF	ARG	Nicolás Tripichio
17	DF	ARG	Lautaro Gianetti
19	FW	ARG	Maximiliano Romero
22	FW	ARG	Nicolás Delgadillo
23	MF	ARG	Leandro Desábato
25	GK	ARG	Tomás Figueroa

No.	Pos.	Nation	Player
26	MF	ARG	Matías Vargas
28	MF	ARG	Nicolás Domínguez
32	DF	ARG	Mauricio Toni
33	FW	ARG	Favio Durán
35	MF	ARG	Santiago Cáseres
36	MF	ARG	Gianluca Mancuso
37	FW	ARG	Matías Aguirre
—	GK	ARG	César Rigamonti (on loan from Belgrano)
—	FW	ARG	Federico Andrada (on loan from River Plate)
—	FW	ARG	Gonzalo Bergessio
—	MF	ARG	Lucas Robertone
—	FW	PAR	Luis Amarilla (on loan from Libertad)

=== Out on loan ===
Note: Flags indicate national team as defined under FIFA eligibility rules; some limited exceptions apply. Players may hold more than one non-FIFA nationality.

No.	Pos.	Nation	Player
—	FW	ARG	Nicolás Servetto (at Brown until 30 June 2018)
—	FW	ARG	Yamil Asad (at D.C. United until 31 December 2017)

== Transfers ==
=== In ===
Date	Pos.	Name	From	Fee
11 July 2017	FW	(Argentina) Gonzalo Bergessio	(Argentina) San Lorenzo	Undisclosed

=== Out ===
Date	Pos.	Name	To	Fee
1 July 2017	GK	(Argentina) Fabián Assmann	Released	
1 July 2017	FW	(Argentina) Juan Manuel Martínez	Released	
1 July 2017	FW	(Argentina) Mariano Pavone	(Argentina) Estudiantes	Undisclosed
4 July 2017	DF	(Argentina) Facundo Cardozo	(Argentina) Arsenal de Sarandí	Undisclosed
18 July 2017	MF	(Argentina) Iván Bella	(Argentina) Arsenal de Sarandí	Undisclosed
21 July 2017	DF	(Argentina) Cristian Nasuti	(Argentina) Olimpo	Undisclosed
30 July 2017	DF	(Argentina) Maximiliano Caire	(Argentina) Tigre	Undisclosed
31 July 2017	MF	(Argentina) Sebastián Martelli	(Argentina) Temperley	Undisclosed

=== Loan in ===
Date from	Date to	Pos.	Name	From
17 July 2017	30 June 2019	FW	(Argentina) Federico Andrada	(Argentina) River Plate
21 July 2017	30 June 2019	FW	(Paraguay) Luis Amarilla	(Paraguay) Libertad
2 August 2017	30 June 2018	GK	(Argentina) César Rigamonti	(Argentina) Belgrano

== Friendlies ==
=== Pre-season ===
Win Draw Loss

22 July 2017 Friendly	Vélez Sarsfield (Argentina)	1–0	(Argentina) Villa San Carlos	Buenos Aires, Argentina
	E. Amor 22'	Report		Stadium: Villa Olímpica de Ituzaingó

22 July 2017 Friendly	Vélez Sarsfield (Argentina)	2–0	(Argentina) Villa San Carlos	Buenos Aires, Argentina
10:00	J. Correa 6'; F. Durán	Report		Stadium: Villa Olímpica de Ituzaingó

26 July 2017 Friendly	Vélez Sarsfield (Argentina)	Cancelled	(Argentina) Talleres	Buenos Aires, Argentina
10:00		Report		Stadium: Villa Olímpica de Ituzaingó

29 July 2017 Friendly	Vélez Sarsfield (Argentina)	0–1	(Argentina) Banfield	Buenos Aires, Argentina
10:00		Report	R. Civelli 19'	Stadium: Villa Olímpica de Ituzaingó

29 July 2017 Friendly	Vélez Sarsfield (Argentina)	1–1	(Argentina) Banfield	Buenos Aires, Argentina
	J. Correa	Report	C. Villagra	Stadium: Villa Olímpica de Ituzaingó

1 August 2017 Friendly	Vélez Sarsfield (Argentina)	2–0	(Argentina) Colón	Buenos Aires, Argentina
09:00	N. Delgadillo; G. Bergessio	Report		Stadium: Villa Olímpica de Ituzaingó

1 August 2017 Friendly	Vélez Sarsfield (Argentina)	3–0	(Argentina) Colón	Buenos Aires, Argentina
	M. Romero; J. Correa; F. Grillo	Report		Stadium: Villa Olímpica de Ituzaingó

4 August 2017 Friendly	Vélez Sarsfield (Argentina)	2–1	(Argentina) San Martín	Ituzaingó, Argentina
09:30	G. Bergessio 7'; N. Domínguez 22'	Report	F. Barcelo 3'	Stadium: Villa Olímpica Raúl Héctor Gámez

8 August 2017 Friendly	Vélez Sarsfield (Argentina)	–	(Argentina) Temperley
		Report

12 August 2017 Friendly	Vélez Sarsfield (Argentina)	–	(Argentina) Gimnasia y Esgrima
09:00		Report

== Primera División ==
=== League table ===
Pos	Team	Pld	W	D	L	GF	GA	GD	Pts	Qualification
12	Argentinos Juniors	27	12	5	10	36	30	+6	41	Qualification for Copa Sudamericana first stage
13	Belgrano	27	10	10	7	29	28	+1	40	
14	Vélez Sarsfield	27	10	8	9	31	32	−1	38	
15	Atlético Tucumán	27	8	12	7	29	26	+3	36	
16	Estudiantes (LP)	27	10	6	11	25	26	−1	36	

Source: AFA
Rules for classification: 1) points; 2) play-off (only if needed to decide championship); 3) goal difference; 4) goals scored; 5) head-to-head points; 6) head-to-head goal difference; 7) head-to-head goals scored.

=== Results by matchday ===
Matchday	1	2	3	4	5	6	7	8	9	10	11	12	13	14	15	16	17	18	19	20	21	22	23	24	25	26	27
Ground	A	H	A	H	A	H	A	H	A	H	H	A	A														
Result	W	W	D	L	L	W	L	L	L	L	W	D															
Position	3	1	3	10	15	14	15	18	21	21	17	19															

Updated to match(es) played on 12 December 2017. Source: Soccerway
A = Away; H = Home; W = Win; D = Draw; L = Loss

25 August 2017 1	Tigre (Argentina)	0–3	(Argentina) Vélez Sarsfield	Buenos Aires, Argentina
19:05		Report	M. Romero 52', 75'; F. Andrada 68'	Stadium: Estadio José Dellagiovanna; Referee: Darío Herrera (Argentina)

8 September 2017 2	Vélez Sarsfield (Argentina)	2–0	(Argentina) Atlético Tucumán	Buenos Aires, Argentina
19:05	M. Romero 43', 73'	Report		Stadium: José Amalfitani Stadium; Referee: Germán Delfino (Argentina)

17 September 2017 3	Talleres (Argentina)	0–0	(Argentina) Vélez Sarsfield	Córdoba, Argentina
11:05		Report		Stadium: Estadio La Boutique; Referee: Nicolás Lamolina (Argentina)

23 September 2017 4	Vélez Sarsfield (Argentina)	0–4	(Argentina) Boca Juniors	Buenos Aires, Argentina
18:05		Report	D. Benedetto 15', 51'; N. Domínguez 63' (o.g.); F. Fabra 86'	Stadium: José Amalfitani Stadium; Referee: Fernando Espinoza (Argentina)

1 October 2017 5	Independiente (Argentina)	1–0	(Argentina) Vélez Sarsfield	Avellaneda, Argentina
16:05	M. Meza 51'	Report		Stadium: Estadio Libertadores de América; Referee: Facundo Tello (Argentina)

14 October 2017 6	Vélez Sarsfield (Argentina)	1–0	(Argentina) Newell's Old Boys	Buenos Aires, Argentina
18:05	M. Vargas 33'	Report		Stadium: José Amalfitani Stadium; Referee: Darío Herrera (Argentina)

29 October 2017 7	Gimnasia y Esgrima (Argentina)	4–0	(Argentina) Vélez Sarsfield	Buenos Aires, Argentina
14:05	N. Dibble 6'; N. Mazzola 46'; L. Faravelli 53'; N. Colazo 63'	Report		Stadium: Estadio Juan Carmelo Zerillo; Referee: Andrés Merlos (Argentina)

6 November 2017 8	Vélez Sarsfield (Argentina)	0–2	(Argentina) Unión Santa Fe	Buenos Aires, Argentina
21:05		Report	F. Soldano 28'; L. Gamba 68'	Stadium: José Amalfitani Stadium; Referee: Federico Beligoy (Argentina)

21 November 2017 9	Huracán (Argentina)	1–0	(Argentina) Vélez Sarsfield	Buenos Aires, Argentina
21:30	M. Bogado 25' (pen.)	Report		Stadium: Estadio Tomás Adolfo Ducó; Referee: Mariano González (Argentina)

23 November 2017 10	Vélez Sarsfield (Argentina)	0–1	(Argentina) Godoy Cruz	Buenos Aires, Argentina
19:15		Report	V. Ramis 69'	Stadium: José Amalfitani Stadium; Referee: Fernando Echenique (Argentina)

27 November 2017 11	Vélez Sarsfield (Argentina)	3–0	(Argentina) Olimpo	Buenos Aires, Argentina
19:15	F. Cubero 57'; G. Bergessio 79', 87'	Report		Stadium: José Amalfitani Stadium; Referee: Pablo Echavarría (Argentina)

4 December 2017 12	Lanús (Argentina)	0–0	(Argentina) Vélez Sarsfield	Lanús, Argentina
17:00		Report		Stadium: Estadio Ciudad de Lanús – Néstor Díaz Pérez; Referee: Jorge Baliño (Argentina)

January 2018 13	Defensa y Justicia (Argentina)	–	(Argentina) Vélez Sarsfield	Buenos Aires, Argentina
		Report		Stadium: Estadio Norberto "Tito" Tomaghello

== Copa Argentina ==
Win Draw Loss

4 September 2017 R32	Aldosivi (Argentina)	0–1	(Argentina) Vélez Sarsfield	Buenos Aires, Argentina
18:00		Report	F. Andrada 84'	Stadium: Estadio Julio Humberto Grondona; Referee: Pablo Echavarría (Argentina)

6 October 2017 R16	Huracán (Argentina)	0–0 (1–3 p)	(Argentina) Vélez Sarsfield	Buenos Aires, Argentina
20:30		Report		Stadium: Estadio Diego Armando Maradona; Referee: Patricio Loustau (Argentina)
	Penalties
	F. Coniglio (penalty scored); R. Ábila (penalty missed); P. Toranzo (penalty missed); A. Romero (penalty missed)		G. Díaz (penalty scored); B. Cufré (penalty scored); M. Vargas (penalty scored)

24 October 2017 QF	Atlético Tucumán (Argentina)	1–0	(Argentina) Vélez Sarsfield	Santa Fe, Argentina
21:10	F. Álvarez 66'	Report		Stadium: Estadio 15 de Abril; Referee: Facundo Tello (Argentina)
