= 2020–21 AC Milan season =

Milan
2020–21 season
- Chairman: Paolo Scaroni
- Head Coach: Stefano Pioli
- Stadium: San Siro
- Serie A: 2nd
- Coppa Italia: Quarter-finals
- UEFA Europa League: Round of 16
- Top goalscorer: League: Zlatan Ibrahimović (15); All: Zlatan Ibrahimović (17)
- Highest home attendance: 1,000 (vs. Bologna, 21 September 2020)
Home colours	Away colours	Third colours

The 2020–21 AC Milan season was the 122nd season in the club's history and their 87th (109th overall) in the top-flight of Italian football. Milan competed in Serie A, the Coppa Italia, and the UEFA Europa League.

== Season overview ==
On 22 July 2020, manager Stefano Pioli extended his expiring contract with Milan for two additional seasons. This came after multiple reports linked Ralf Rangnick to the club. The previous day, Milan had secured a play-off spot in the UEFA Europa League for the 2020–21 season thanks to an away win against Sassuolo.

On 1 October, Milan qualified for the group stage of the Europa League after defeating Primeira Liga side Rio Ave in a marathon 24-kick penalty shoot-out. The win also continued an unbeaten run for Milan in all competitions that stretched back to 8 March 2020.

On 5 November 2020, the club fell to its first defeat in 24 matches with a 0–3 loss at home to Lille in the Europa League. It was Milan's longest unbeaten streak in 24 years.

On 20 December 2020, Rafael Leao scored after 6.76 seconds in a championship match against Sassuolo. This was the fastest goal ever in Serie A and in the top 5 UEFA leagues.

On 23 December 2020, in a championship match against Lazio, Milan became the first team in over 70 years to score at least 2 goals in 15 consecutive league games, the record being 18 consecutive games.

After the winter transfers window, Milan remained without South American players active into main rosters, after the sales of Léo Duarte and Mateo Musacchio. It was the first time since 24 years (1997).

On the final day they secured qualification for the UEFA Champions League for the first time since the 2013-14 season

== Players ==
=== Squad information ===
As of 30 June 2021.

No.	Player	Nat.	Position(s)	Date of birth (age)	Signed in	Contract ends	Signed from	Transfer fee	Notes	Apps	Goals
Goalkeepers
1	Ciprian Tătărușanu	(Romania)	GK	9 February 1986 (aged 35)	2020	2023	(France) Lyon	€500,000		5	0
90	Antonio Donnarumma	(Italy)	GK	7 July 1990 (aged 30)	2017	2021	(Greece) Asteras Tripolis	€300,000	From Youth system	3	0
96	Andreas Jungdal	(Denmark)	GK	22 February 2002 (aged 19)	2019	2022	(Denmark) Vejle	€800,000	From Youth system	0	0
99	Gianluigi Donnarumma	(Italy)	GK	25 February 1999 (aged 22)	2015	2021	(Italy) Milan Primavera	Free	From Youth system	251	0
Defenders
2	Davide Calabria	(Italy)	RB / LB / CM	6 December 1996 (aged 24)	2015	2022	(Italy) Milan Primavera	Free	From Youth system	151	5
5	Diogo Dalot	(Portugal)	RB / LB / RM	18 February 1999 (aged 22)	2020	2021	(England) Manchester United	Loan		33	2
13	Alessio Romagnoli	(Italy)	CB / LB	12 January 1995 (aged 26)	2015	2022	(Italy) Roma	€25,000,000	Captain	221	9
19	Théo Hernandez	(France)	LB / LM	6 October 1997 (aged 23)	2019	2024	(Spain) Real Madrid	€20,000,000		81	15
20	Pierre Kalulu	(France)	RB / CB	5 June 2000 (aged 21)	2020	2025	(France) Lyon II	€480,000		18	1
23	Fikayo Tomori	(England)	CB / RB	19 December 1997 (aged 23)	2021	2021	(England) Chelsea	Loan	Option for €28M	22	1
24	Simon Kjær	(Denmark)	CB	26 March 1989 (aged 32)	2020	2022	(Spain) Sevilla	€2,500,000		58	1
46	Matteo Gabbia	(Italy)	CB / DM	21 October 1999 (aged 21)	2017	2023	(Italy) Milan Primavera	Free	From Youth system	24	0
Midfielders
4	Ismaël Bennacer	(Algeria)	DM / CM	1 December 1997 (aged 23)	2019	2024	(Italy) Empoli	€16,000,000		65	1
8	Sandro Tonali	(Italy)	CM / DM	8 May 2000 (aged 21)	2020	2021	(Italy) Brescia	Loan	€10M loan + €15M option	37	0
10	Hakan Çalhanoğlu	(Turkey)	AM / CM / LW	8 February 1994 (aged 27)	2017	2021	(Germany) Bayer Leverkusen	€20,000,000		172	32
18	Soualiho Meïté	(France)	CM / DM / AM	17 March 1994 (aged 27)	2021	2021	(Italy) Torino	Loan	€500,000 loan + €8M option	21	0
21	Brahim Díaz	(Spain)	AM / RW / LW	3 August 1999 (aged 21)	2020	2021	(Spain) Real Madrid	Loan		39	7
27	Daniel Maldini	(Italy)	AM / LW / ST	11 October 2001 (aged 19)	2020	2024	(Italy) Milan Primavera	Free	From Youth system	11	0
33	Rade Krunić	(Bosnia and Herzegovina)	CM / AM / LM	7 October 1993 (aged 27)	2019	2024	(Italy) Empoli	€8,000,000		56	2
79	Franck Kessié	(Ivory Coast)	CM / DM	19 December 1996 (aged 24)	2017	2022	(Italy) Atalanta	€28,000,000		184	30
Forwards
7	Samu Castillejo	(Spain)	RW / LW / SS	18 January 1995 (aged 26)	2018	2023	(Spain) Villarreal	€25,000,000		108	10
9	Mario Mandžukić	(Croatia)	ST / LW	21 May 1986 (aged 35)	2021	2021	Free agent	Free		11	0
11	Zlatan Ibrahimović	(Sweden)	ST	3 October 1981 (aged 39)	2020	2022	(United States) LA Galaxy	Free		132	84
12	Ante Rebić	(Croatia)	LW / ST / SS	21 September 1993 (aged 27)	2019	2025	(Germany) Eintracht Frankfurt	Undisclosed		63	23
15	Jens Petter Hauge	(Norway)	LW / RW / SS	12 October 1999 (aged 21)	2020	2025	(Norway) Bodø/Glimt	€4,000,000		24	5
17	Rafael Leão	(Portugal)	ST / LW / RW	10 June 1999 (aged 22)	2019	2024	(France) Lille	€28,000,000		73	13
56	Alexis Saelemaekers	(Belgium)	RW / LW / RB	27 June 1999 (aged 22)	2020	2024	(Belgium) Anderlecht	€7,200,000		55	4

== Transfers ==
=== Summer window ===
Deals officialised beforehand were effective starting from 1 September 2020.

==== In ====
Date	Pos.	Player	A.	Moving from	Fee	Notes	Source
1 July 2020	MF	(Belgium) Alexis Saelemaekers	21	(Belgium) Anderlecht	€3.7M	From loan to definitive purchase	
15 July 2020	DF	(Denmark) Simon Kjær	31	(Spain) Sevilla	€2.5M	From loan to definitive purchase	
14 August 2020	FW	(Sweden) Emil Roback	17	(Sweden) Hammarby	€1.5M	Joined Primavera team	
21 August 2020	DF	(France) (Democratic Republic of the Congo) Pierre Kalulu	20	(France) Lyon II	€0.48M		
11 September 2020	GK	(Romania) Ciprian Tătărușanu	34	(France) Lyon	€0.5M		
12 September 2020	FW	(Croatia) Ante Rebić	26	(Germany) Eintracht Frankfurt	Undisclosed	From loan to definitive purchase	
1 October 2020	FW	(Norway) Jens Petter Hauge	20	(Norway) Bodø/Glimt	€4M		

==== Loan in ====
Date	Pos.	Player	A.	Moving from	Fee	Notes	Source
4 September 2020	MF	(Spain) Brahim Díaz	21	(Spain) Real Madrid	Free		
9 September 2020	MF	(Italy) Sandro Tonali	20	(Italy) Brescia	€10M	€15M option to buy + €10M add-ons	
4 October 2020	DF	(Portugal) Diogo Dalot	21	(England) Manchester United	Undisclosed		

==== Loan returns ====
Date	Pos.	Player	A.	Moving from	Fee	Notes	Source
1 July 2020	FW	(Kosovo) Ismet Sinani	21	(Italy) Sicula Leonzio	Free		
1 August 2020	DF	(France) (Cameroon) Leroy Abanda	20	(Switzerland) Neuchâtel Xamax	Free	Re-joined Primavera team	

Total spending: ▼€23.68M

==== Out ====
Date	Pos.	Player	A.	Moving to	Fee	Notes	Source
13 July 2020	MF	(Spain) Suso	26	(Spain) Sevilla	€24M	Obligation to buy	
8 August 2020	FW	(Mali) (Italy) Siaka Haidara	19	(Italy) Lecco	Free	From Primavera team	
14 August 2020	GK	(Italy) Matteo Soncin	19	(Italy) Pergolettese	Free	From Primavera team	
14 August 2020	DF	(Italy) Tommaso Merletti	18	(Italy) Renate	Free	From Primavera team	
18 August 2020	MF	(Italy) Emanuele Torrasi	21	(Italy) Imolese	Free	From Primavera team	
19 August 2020	DF	(Switzerland) Ricardo Rodríguez	27	(Italy) Torino	€3M	After return from loan	
27 August 2020	GK	(Spain) Pepe Reina	37	(Italy) Lazio	Free	After return from loan	
1 September 2020	MF	(Argentina) Lucas Biglia	34	(Turkey) Fatih Karagümrük	Free	End of contract	
1 September 2020	MF	(Italy) Giacomo Bonaventura	31	(Italy) Fiorentina	Free	End of contract	
2 September 2020	DF	(Italy) Alberto Barazzetta	19	(Italy) Giana Erminio	Free	From Primavera team	
10 September 2020	FW	(Portugal) André Silva	24	(Germany) Eintracht Frankfurt	Undisclosed	From loan to definitive purchase	
21 September 2020	FW	(Italy) Riccardo Forte	21	(Italy) Cavese	Undisclosed	After return from loan	
30 September 2020	MF	(Brazil) Lucas Paquetá	23	(France) Lyon	€20M	15% sell-on fee	
5 October 2020	MF	(Croatia) Alen Halilović	23	(England) Birmingham City	Free	After return from loan	

==== Loans ended ====
Date	Pos.	Player	A.	Moving to	Fee	Notes	Source
1 September 2020	GK	(Bosnia and Herzegovina) Asmir Begović	33	(England) Bournemouth	Free		

==== Loans out ====
Date	Pos.	Player	A.	Moving to	Fee	Notes	Source
9 July 2020	FW	(Italy) (Cameroon) Frank Tsadjout	20	(Belgium) Charleroi	Free	Loan confirmed	
21 August 2020	GK	(Italy) Alessandro Plizzari	20	(Italy) Reggina	Free	After return from loan	
29 August 2020	MF	(Italy) Marco Brescianini	20	(Italy) Virtus Entella	Free	From Primavera team	
14 September 2020	MF	(Italy) Alessandro Sala	19	(Italy) Cesena	Free	From Primavera team	
18 September 2020	FW	(Italy) (Cameroon) Frank Tsadjout	21	(Italy) Cittadella	Free	After anticipated return from loan	
23 September 2020	MF	(Italy) Tommaso Pobega	21	(Italy) Spezia	Free	After return from loan	
24 September 2020	DF	(Italy) Gabriele Galardi	18	(Italy) Viterbese	Free	From Primavera team	
2 October 2020	MF	(Croatia) (Italy) Emir Murati	20	(Italy) Pro Sesto	Free	After return from loan	
3 October 2020	DF	(Italy) Gabriele Bellodi	20	(Italy) Alessandria	Free	After return from loan	
5 October 2020	FW	(Italy) Gabriele Capanni	19	(Italy) Cesena	Free	After return from loan	
5 October 2020	DF	(Uruguay) Diego Laxalt	27	(Scotland) Celtic	Free		

Total income: ▲€47M

=== Winter window ===
Deals officialised beforehand were effective starting from 2 January 2021.

==== In ====
Date	Pos.	Player	A.	Moving from	Fee	Notes	Source
19 January 2021	FW	(Croatia) Mario Mandžukić	34	Unattached	Free		

==== Loans in ====
Date	Pos.	Player	A.	Moving from	Fee	Notes	Source
15 January 2021	MF	(France) Soualiho Meïté	26	(Italy) Torino	€500,000	Loan with option to buy	
22 January 2021	DF	(England) Fikayo Tomori	23	(England) Chelsea	Undisclosed	Loan with option to buy	

==== Loan returns ====
Total spending: ▼€0.5M

==== Out ====
Date	Pos.	Player	A.	Moving to	Fee	Notes	Source
27 January 2021	DF	(Argentina) Mateo Musacchio	30	(Italy) Lazio	€1M		
1 February 2021	FW	(Kosovo) Ismet Sinani	21	(Italy) U.S.G. Sedico	Free		

==== Loans out ====
Date	Pos.	Player	A.	Moving to	Fee	Notes	Source
11 January 2021	DF	(Brazil) Léo Duarte	24	(Turkey) İstanbul Başakşehir	Free	18-month loan with option to buy	
21 January 2021	DF	(Italy) Andrea Conti	26	(Italy) Parma	Free	Loan with option to buy	
22 January 2021	DF	(Italy) Gabriele Galardi	18	(Italy) Lucchese	Free	After anticipated return from loan	
25 January 2021	FW	(Italy) Lorenzo Colombo	18	(Italy) Cremonese	Free		
30 January 2021	MF	(Croatia) (Italy) Emir Murati	20	(Italy) Vibonese	Free	After anticipated return from loan	
30 January 2021	FW	(Brazil) Luan Capanni	20	(Spain) Racing Santander	Free		
1 February 2021	MF	(Italy) Alessandro Sala	19	(Italy) Pro Sesto	Free	After anticipated return from loan	

Total income:▲€1M

== Pre-season and friendlies ==
2 September 2020 Friendly	Milan	4–2	Novara	Carnago, Italy
17:00 CEST (UTC+2)	Paquetá 26', 57'; Laxalt 32'; Calabria 47'	Report	Bellich 10', 13'	Stadium: Milanello; Attendance: 0 Referee: Luca De Angeli (Italy)

5 September 2020 Friendly	Milan	4–1	Monza	Milan, Italy
20:45 CEST (UTC+2)	Calabria 6'; Maldini 40'; Kalulu 89'; Colombo 90+2'	Report	Finotto 23'	Stadium: San Siro; Attendance: 0 Referee: Paolo Sozza (Italy)

9 September 2020 Friendly	Milan	5–1	Vicenza	Carnago, Italy
17:00 CEST (UTC+2)	Castillejo 11', 30'; Colombo 22'; Brahim 75'; Stanga 90+2'	Report	Guerra 56'	Stadium: Milanello; Attendance: 0 Referee: Alessandro Di Graci (Italy)

12 September 2020 Friendly	Milan	3–1	Brescia	Carnago, Italy
17:00 CEST (UTC+2)	Kessié 40'; Colombo 49'; Castillejo 61'	Report	Ghezzi 74'	Stadium: Milanello; Attendance: 0 Referee: Kevin Bonacina (Italy)

== Competitions ==
=== Overview ===
Competition	First match	Last match	Starting round	Final position	Record							
Competition	First match	Last match	Starting round	Final position	Pld	W	D	L	GF	GA	GD	Win %
Serie A	21 September 2020	23 May 2021	Matchday 1	2nd	38	24	7	7	74	41	+33	63.16
Coppa Italia	12 January 2021	26 January 2021	Round of 16	Quarter-finals	2	0	1	1	1	2	−1	0.00
UEFA Europa League	17 September 2020	18 March 2021	Second qualifying round	Round of 16	13	6	5	2	23	16	+7	46.15
Total					53	30	13	10	98	59	+39	56.60

Source: Soccerway

=== Serie A ===
==== League table ====
Pos	Team	Pld	W	D	L	GF	GA	GD	Pts	Qualification or relegation
1	Inter Milan (C)	38	28	7	3	89	35	+54	91	Qualification for Champions League group stage
2	Milan	38	24	7	7	74	41	+33	79	Qualification for Champions League group stage
3	Atalanta	38	23	9	6	90	47	+43	78 (Note: Atalanta finished ahead of Juventus on head-to-head points: Juventus 1–1 Atalanta, Atalanta 1–0 Juventus.)	Qualification for Champions League group stage
4	Juventus	38	23	9	6	77	38	+39	78	Qualification for Champions League group stage
5	Napoli	38	24	5	9	86	41	+45	77	Qualification for Europa League group stage (Note: Since the winners of the 2020–21 Coppa Italia, Juventus, qualified for the Champions League, the Europa League berth awarded to the Coppa Italia winners was passed to the sixth-placed team, and the Europa Conference League berth awarded to the sixth-placed team was passed to the seventh-placed team.)

Source: Serie A, Soccerway
Rules for classification: 1) Points; 2) Head-to-head points; 3) Head-to-head goal difference; 4) Goal difference; 5) Goals scored; 6) Draw. (Note: Head-to-head record is used only after all the matches between the teams in question have been played)
(C) Champions

==== Results summary ====
Overall								Home						Away					
Pld	W	D	L	GF	GA	GD	Pts	W	D	L	GF	GA	GD	W	D	L	GF	GA	GD
38	24	7	7	74	41	+33	79	8	6	5	31	24	+7	16	1	2	43	17	+26

Source: Competitive matches

==== Results by round ====
Round	1	2	3	4	5	6	7	8	9	10	11	12	13	14	15	16	17	18	19	20	21	22	23	24	25	26	27	28	29	30	31	32	33	34	35	36	37	38
Ground	H	A	H	A	H	A	H	A	H	A	H	A	A	H	A	H	H	A	H	A	H	A	H	A	H	A	H	A	H	A	H	H	A	H	A	A	H	A
Result	W	W	W	W	D	W	D	W	W	W	D	D	W	W	W	L	W	W	L	W	W	L	L	W	D	W	L	W	D	W	W	L	L	W	W	W	D	W
Position	4	5	2	1	1	1	1	1	1	1	1	1	1	1	1	1	1	1	1	1	1	2	2	2	2	2	2	2	2	2	2	2	5	4	3	3	3	2

Source: Competitive matches
A = Away; H = Home; W = Win; D = Draw; L = Loss

==== Matches ====
The league fixtures were announced on 2 September 2020.

21 September 2020 1	Milan	2–0	Bologna	Milan
20:45 CEST (UTC+02:00)	Ibrahimović 35', 50' (pen.); Castillejo (yellow card) 40'; Krunić (yellow card) 86'; Gabbia (yellow card) 89'	Report	Domínguez (yellow card) 18'; Dijks (yellow card) 31' (yellow-red card) 88'; Tomiyasu (yellow card) 74'; Sansone (yellow card) 82'	Stadium: San Siro; Referee: Federico La Penna

27 September 2020 2	Crotone	0–2	Milan	Crotone
18:00 CEST (UTC+02:00)	Marrone (yellow card) 45+2'	Report	Kessié 45+2' (pen.); Brahim 50'; Gabbia (yellow card) 63'; Hernandez (yellow card) 78'; Leão (yellow card) 90+3'	Stadium: Stadio Ezio Scida; Referee: Luca Pairetto

4 October 2020 3	Milan	3–0	Spezia	Milan
18:00 CEST (UTC+02:00)	Çalhanoğlu (yellow card) 47'; Leão 57', 78'; Hernandez 76'	Report	Ricci (yellow card) 32'; Gyasi (yellow card) 40'	Stadium: San Siro; Referee: Marco Serra

17 October 2020 4	Internazionale	1–2	Milan	Milan
18:00 CEST (UTC+02:00)	Lukaku 29'; Brozović (yellow card) 64'; Vidal (yellow card) 69'; Hakimi (yellow card) 83'	Report	Ibrahimović (penalty missed) 13', 13', 16', (yellow card) 60'; Kjær (yellow card) 22'; Kessié (yellow card) 45+1'	Stadium: San Siro; Referee: Maurizio Mariani

26 October 2020 5	Milan	3–3	Roma	Milan
20:45 CET (UTC+01:00)	Ibrahimović 2', 79' (pen.), (yellow card) 75'; Saelemaekers 47'; Leão (yellow card) 70'; Hernandez (yellow card) 83'	Report	Džeko 14'; Veretout 71' (pen.); Pedro (yellow card) 77'; Cristante (yellow card) 81'; Kumbulla 84'	Stadium: San Siro; Referee: Piero Giacomelli

1 November 2020 6	Udinese	1–2	Milan	Udine
12:30 CET (UTC+01:00)	Becão (yellow card) 24'; Arslan (yellow card) 39'; De Paul 48' (pen.)	Report	Hernandez (yellow card) 13'; Kessié 18'; G. Donnarumma (yellow card) 49'; Ibrahimović 83'	Stadium: Stadio Friuli; Attendance: 0 Referee: Marco Di Bello

8 November 2020 7	Milan	2–2	Hellas Verona	Milan
20:45 CET (UTC+01:00)	Magnani 27' (o.g.); Bennacer (yellow card) 54'; Ibrahimović (penalty missed) 65', 90+3'	Report	Barák 6'; Calabria 19' (o.g.); Ceccherini (yellow card) 33'; Lovato (yellow card) 42'; Tameze (yellow card) 90+1'	Stadium: San Siro; Attendance: 0 Referee: Marco Guida

22 November 2020 8	Napoli	1–3	Milan	Naples
20:45 CET (UTC+1)	Bakayoko (yellow card) 16' (yellow-red card) 65'; Mertens 63'; Mário Rui (yellow card) 82'	Report	Ibrahimović 20', 54'; Calabria (yellow card) 47'; Rebić (yellow card) 59'; Kessié (yellow card) 76'; Castillejo (yellow card) 85'; Hauge 90+5'	Stadium: Stadio San Paolo; Attendance: 0 Referee: Paolo Valeri

29 November 2020 9	Milan	2–0	Fiorentina	Milan
15:00 CET (UTC+1)	Romagnoli 17'; Kessié 28' (pen.), (penalty missed) 40', (yellow card) 71'; Rebić (yellow card) 45+2'	Report	Pezzella (yellow card) 25'; Castrovilli (yellow card) 52'; Biraghi (yellow card) 87'; Amrabat (yellow card) 90+1'	Stadium: San Siro; Attendance: 0 Referee: Rosario Abisso

6 December 2020 10	Sampdoria	1–2	Milan	Genoa
20:45 CET (UTC+1)	Silva (yellow card) 26'; Jankto (yellow card) 45+2'; Ekdal 83'	Report	Kessié (yellow card) 5', (goal) 45' (pen.); Castillejo 77'	Stadium: Stadio Luigi Ferraris; Attendance: 0 Referee: Gianpaolo Calvarese

13 December 2020 11	Milan	2–2	Parma	Milan
20:45 CET (UTC+1)	Hernandez (yellow card) 35', (goal) 58', 90+1'; Calabria (yellow card) 80'; Kalulu (yellow card) 83'	Report	Hernani 13'; Osorio (yellow card) 41'; Kurtić 56'; Iacoponi (yellow card) 64'; Inglese (yellow card) 76'	Stadium: San Siro; Attendance: 0 Referee: Francesco Fourneau

16 December 2020 12	Genoa	2–2	Milan	Genoa
20:45 CET (UTC+1)	Pellegrini (yellow card) 18'; Destro 47', 60'; Radovanović (yellow card) 87'	Report	Romagnoli (yellow card) 25'; Calabria 52'; Castillejo (yellow card) 54'; Kalulu 83'; Leão (yellow card) 83'	Stadium: Stadio Luigi Ferraris; Attendance: 0 Referee: Daniele Orsato

20 December 2020 13	Sassuolo	1–2	Milan	Reggio Emilia
15:00 CET (UTC+1)	Berardi (yellow card) 65', (goal) 89'	Report	Leão 1'; Saelemaekers 26'; Kessié (yellow card) 61'; Calabria (yellow card) 71'; Romagnoli (yellow card) 88'	Stadium: Mapei Stadium; Attendance: 0 Referee: Maurizio Mariani

23 December 2020 14	Milan	3–2	Lazio	Milan
20:45 CET (UTC+1)	Rebić 10'; Çalhanoğlu 17' (pen.); Krunić (yellow card) 41'; Hernandez (yellow card) 78', (goal) 90+2'	Report	Immobile (penalty missed) 28', 59'; Luis Alberto 28', (yellow card) 64'; Escalante (yellow card) 39'; Akpa Akpro (yellow card) 80'; Muriqi (yellow card) 88'	Stadium: San Siro; Attendance: 0 Referee: Marco Di Bello

3 January 2021 15	Benevento	0–2	Milan	Benevento
18:00 CET (UTC+1)	Schiattarella (yellow card) 32'; Caprari (penalty missed) 61'	Report	Kessié 15' (pen.); Tonali (red card) 34'; Çalhanoğlu (yellow card) 41'; Leão 49', (yellow card) 80'; Dalot (yellow card) 78'	Stadium: Stadio Ciro Vigorito; Attendance: 0 Referee: Fabrizio Pasqua

6 January 2021 16	Milan	1–3	Juventus	Milan
20:45 CET (UTC+1)	Calabria 41'; Romagnoli (yellow card) 90'	Report	Chiesa 18', 62'; Bentancur (yellow card) 60'; Danilo (yellow card) 72'; McKennie 76'	Stadium: San Siro; Attendance: 0 Referee: Massimiliano Irrati

9 January 2021 17	Milan	2–0	Torino	Milan
20:45 CET (UTC+1)	Leão 25', (yellow card) 80'; Kessié 36' (pen.); Brahim (yellow card) 38'; Romagnoli (yellow card) 41'; Tonali (yellow card) 45+2'; Dalot (yellow card) 65'; Calabria (yellow card) 85'	Report	Rincón (yellow card) 26'; Segre (yellow card) 90+2'	Stadium: San Siro; Attendance: 0 Referee: Fabio Maresca

18 January 2021 18	Cagliari	0–2	Milan	Cagliari
20:45 CET (UTC+1)	Godín (yellow card) 83'; Ceppitelli (yellow card) 88'	Report	Ibrahimović 7' (pen.), 52'; Romagnoli (yellow card) 39'; Saelemaekers (yellow card) 68' (yellow-red card) 74'	Stadium: Sardegna Arena; Attendance: 0 Referee: Rosario Abisso

23 January 2021 19	Milan	0–3	Atalanta	Milan
18:00 CET (UTC+1)	Hernandez (yellow card) 38'; Kessié (yellow card) 51'	Report	Romero 26'; Iličić 53' (pen.); Zapata 77'; Gosens (yellow card) 84'	Stadium: San Siro; Attendance: 0 Referee: Maurizio Mariani

30 January 2021 20	Bologna	1–2	Milan	Bologna
15:00 CET (UTC+1)	Dijks (yellow card) 24'; Soriano (yellow card) 56'; Poli 81'	Report	Ibrahimović (penalty missed) 26'; Rebić 26', (yellow card) 51'; Kessié 55' (pen.)	Stadium: Stadio Renato Dall'Ara; Attendance: 0 Referee: Daniele Doveri

7 February 2021 21	Milan	4–0	Crotone	Milan
15:00 CET (UTC+1)	Ibrahimović 30', 64'; Saelemaekers (yellow card) 36'; Rebić 69', 70'; Romagnoli (yellow card) 82'; Calabria (yellow card) 86'	Report	Rispoli (yellow card) 74'	Stadium: San Siro; Attendance: 0 Referee: Luca Pairetto

13 February 2021 22	Spezia	2–0	Milan	La Spezia
20:45 CET (UTC+1)	Vignali (yellow card) 23'; Bastoni (yellow card) 25', (goal) 67'; Maggiore 56'; Erlić (yellow card) 58'	Report	Dalot (yellow card) 65'	Stadium: Stadio Alberto Picco; Attendance: 0 Referee: Daniele Chiffi

21 February 2021 23	Milan	0–3	Internazionale	Milan
15:00 CET (UTC+1)	Kjær (yellow card) 12'; Saelemaekers (yellow card) 56'	Report	Martínez 5', 57'; Hakimi (yellow card) 22'; Lukaku 66'	Stadium: San Siro; Attendance: 0 Referee: Daniele Doveri

28 February 2021 24	Roma	1–2	Milan	Rome
20:45 CET (UTC+1)	Fazio (yellow card) 42'; Veretout 50'; Mkhitaryan (yellow card) 80'; Pellegrini (yellow card) 89'	Report	Kessié 43' (pen.); Saelemaekers (yellow card) 46'; Rebić 58'; Calabria (yellow card) 86'; Castillejo (yellow card) 90+5'	Stadium: Stadio Olimpico; Attendance: 0 Referee: Marco Guida

3 March 2021 25	Milan	1–1	Udinese	Milan
20:45 CET (UTC+1)	Rebić (yellow card) 24'; Hernandez (yellow card) 32'; Romagnoli (yellow card) 90+2'; Kessié (yellow card) 90+4', (goal) 90+7' (pen.)	Report	Zeegelaar (yellow card) 54'; Becão 68'	Stadium: San Siro; Attendance: 0 Referee: Davide Massa

7 March 2021 26	Hellas Verona	0–2	Milan	Verona
15:00 CET (UTC+1)	Magnani (yellow card) 26'; Bessa (yellow card) 90+3'	Report	Krunić 27'; Dalot 50'	Stadium: Stadio Marcantonio Bentegodi; Attendance: 0 Referee: Daniele Orsato

14 March 2021 27	Milan	0–1	Napoli	Milan
20:45 CET (UTC+1)	Hernandez (yellow card) 86'; Rebić (red card) 90+2'	Report	Maksimović (yellow card) 26'; Politano 49'; Di Lorenzo (yellow card) 70'	Stadium: San Siro; Attendance: 0 Referee: Fabrizio Pasqua

21 March 2021 28	Fiorentina	2–3	Milan	Florence
18:00 CET (UTC+1)	Pulgar 17'; Ribéry 51'; Kouamé (yellow card) 89'	Report	Ibrahimović 9'; Çalhanoğlu (yellow card) 41', (goal) 72'; Dalot (yellow card) 47'; Díaz 57'; Meïté (yellow card) 90+2'	Stadium: Stadio Artemio Franchi; Attendance: 0 Referee: Marco Guida

3 April 2021 29	Milan	1–1	Sampdoria	Milan
12:30 CEST (UTC+2)	Saelemaekers (yellow card) 45'; Bennacer (yellow card) 50'; Hauge 87'	Report	Colley (yellow card) 32'; Thorsby (yellow card) 39'; Silva (yellow card) 45+1' (yellow-red card) 59'; Quagliarella 57'; Candreva (yellow card) 73'	Stadium: San Siro; Attendance: 0 Referee: Marco Piccinini

10 April 2021 30	Parma	1–3	Milan	Parma
18:00 CEST (UTC+2)	Bani (yellow card) 10'; Pezzella (yellow card) 37'; Gagliolo (yellow card) 38', (goal) 66'; Kucka (yellow card) 64'	Report	Rebić 8'; Çalhanoğlu (yellow card) 24'; Kessié 44', (yellow card) 81'; Ibrahimović (red card) 60'; Hernandez (yellow card) 78'; Meïté (yellow card) 90'; Leão 90+4'	Stadium: Stadio Ennio Tardini; Attendance: 0 Referee: Fabio Maresca

18 April 2021 31	Milan	2–1	Genoa	Milan
12:30 CEST (UTC+2)	Rebić 13'; Scamacca 68' (o.g.)	Report	Goldaniga (yellow card) 26'; Destro 37'	Stadium: San Siro; Attendance: 0 Referee: Gianpaolo Calvarese

21 April 2021 32	Milan	1–2	Sassuolo	Milan
18:30 CEST (UTC+2)	Çalhanoğlu 30'	Report	Đuričić (yellow card) 60'; Raspadori 76', 83'	Stadium: San Siro; Attendance: 0 Referee: Juan Luca Sacchi

26 April 2021 33	Lazio	3–0	Milan	Rome
20:45 CEST (UTC+2)	Correa 2', 51'; Acerbi (yellow card) 19'; Milinković-Savić (yellow card) 57'; Immobile 87'	Report		Stadium: Stadio Olimpico; Attendance: 0 Referee: Daniele Orsato

1 May 2021 34	Milan	2–0	Benevento	Milan
20:45 CEST (UTC+2)	Çalhanoğlu 6'; Bennacer (yellow card) 38'; Hernandez 60'; Castillejo (yellow card) 90+4'	Report		Stadium: San Siro; Attendance: 0 Referee: Gianpaolo Calvarese

9 May 2021 35	Juventus	0–3	Milan	Turin
20:45 CEST (UTC+2)	Chiesa (yellow card) 53'; Chiellini (yellow card) 57'	Report	Brahim 45+1', (yellow card) 59'; Kessié (penalty missed) 58'; Saelemaekers (yellow card) 76'; Rebić 78'; Tomori 82'	Stadium: Allianz Stadium; Attendance: 0 Referee: Paolo Valeri

12 May 2021 36	Torino	0–7	Milan	Turin
20:45 CEST (UTC+2)	Baselli (yellow card) 44'; Linetty (yellow card) 48'	Report	Hernandez 19', 62'; Kessié 26' (pen.); Bennacer (yellow card) 41'; Brahim 50'; Rebić 67', 72', 79'	Stadium: Stadio Olimpico Grande Torino; Attendance: 0 Referee: Marco Guida

16 May 2021 37	Milan	0–0	Cagliari	Milan
20:45 CEST (UTC+2)	Kjær (yellow card) 33'; Calabria (yellow card) 58'	Report	Marin (yellow card) 40'; Carboni (yellow card) 45+1'	Stadium: San Siro; Attendance: 0 Referee: Davide Massa

23 May 2021 38	Atalanta	0–2	Milan	Bergamo
20:45 CEST (UTC+2)	Freuler (yellow card) 47'; De Roon (yellow card) 69', (red card) 90+1'; Toloi (yellow card) 86'	Report	Kessié 43' (pen.), 90+2' (pen.); Mandžukić (yellow card) 82'; Krunić (yellow card) 90+1'; Dalot (yellow card) 90+2'	Stadium: Gewiss Stadium; Attendance: 0 Referee: Maurizio Mariani

=== Coppa Italia ===
12 January 2021 Round of 16	Milan	0–0 (a.e.t.) (5–4 p)	Torino	Milan
20:45 CET (UTC+1)	G. Donnarumma (yellow card) 72', (red card) 73'; Tonali (yellow card) 85'; Kessié (yellow card) 112'	Report	Rincón (yellow card) 27'; Linetty (yellow card) 29'; Zaza (yellow card) 46'; Lukić (yellow card) 101'; Lyanco (yellow card) 115'; Gojak (yellow card) 118'	Stadium: San Siro; Referee: Paolo Valeri
	Penalties
	Kessié (penalty scored); Hernandez (penalty scored); Tonali (penalty scored); Romagnoli (penalty scored); Çalhanoğlu (penalty scored)		(penalty scored) Belotti; (penalty scored) Lukić; (penalty scored) Lyanco; (penalty missed) Rincón; (penalty scored) Milinković-Savić
Note: G. Donnarumma was sent off for dissent while a substitute.

26 January 2021 Quarter-finals	Internazionale	2–1	Milan	Milan
20:45 CET (UTC+1)	Lukaku (yellow card) 45', (goal) 71' (pen.); Brozović (yellow card) 52'; Eriksen 90+7'; Hakimi (yellow card) 90+10'	Report	Kjær (yellow card) 17'; Ibrahimović 31', (yellow card) 45+1' (yellow-red card) 58'; Rebić (yellow card) 65'; Kessié (yellow card) 90+9'	Stadium: San Siro; Referee: Paolo Valeri

=== UEFA Europa League ===
==== Qualifying rounds and play-off round ====
17 September 2020 Second qualifying round	Shamrock Rovers (Republic of Ireland)	0–2	(Italy) Milan	Tallaght, Ireland
20:00 CEST (UTC+2)	Grace (yellow card) 51'	Report	Ibrahimović 23'; Çalhanoğlu 67'	Stadium: Tallaght Stadium; Attendance: 0 Referee: Ádám Farkas (Hungary)

24 September 2020 Third qualifying round	Milan (Italy)	3–2	(Norway) Bodø/Glimt	Milan, Italy
20:30 CEST (UTC+2)	Çalhanoğlu 16', 50'; Colombo 32'	Report	Junker 15'; Hauge 55'; Konradsen (yellow card) 69'	Stadium: San Siro; Attendance: 0 Referee: Fran Jović (Croatia)

1 October 2020 Play-off round	Rio Ave (Portugal)	2–2 (a.e.t.) (8–9 p)	(Italy) Milan	Vila do Conde, Portugal
21:00 (20:00 WEST)	Borevković (yellow card) 15' (yellow-red card) 120+1'; Moreira (yellow card) 41'; Santos (yellow card) 47'; Filipe Augusto (yellow card) 65'; Tarantini (yellow card) 68'; Geraldes 72'; Gelson 91'	Report	Saelemaekers 51'; Hernandez (yellow card) 61'; Leão (yellow card) 98'; Kjær (yellow card) 113'; Çalhanoğlu 120+2' (pen.)	Stadium: Estádio dos Arcos; Attendance: 0 Referee: Jesús Gil Manzano (Spain)
	Penalties
	Geraldes (penalty scored); Santos (penalty scored); Jambor (penalty scored); Piazon (penalty scored); Filipe Augusto (penalty scored); Gelson (penalty scored); Gabrielzinho (penalty scored); Monte (penalty missed); Pinto (penalty scored); Kieszek (penalty missed); Geraldes (penalty missed); Santos (penalty missed)		(penalty scored) Bennacer; (penalty scored) Kjær; (penalty scored) Hernandez; (penalty scored) Brahim; (penalty scored) Çalhanoğlu; (penalty scored) Calabria; (penalty scored) Tonali; (penalty missed) Colombo; (penalty scored) Leão; (penalty missed) G. Donnarumma; (penalty missed) Bennacer; (penalty scored) Kjær

==== Group stage ====
The group stage draw was held on 2 October 2020.

Pos	Team	Pld	W	D	L	GF	GA	GD	Pts	Qualification	MIL	LOSC	SPP	CEL
1	(Italy) Milan	6	4	1	1	12	7	+5	13	Advance to knockout phase	—	0–3	3–0	4–2
2	(France) Lille	6	3	2	1	14	8	+6	11	Advance to knockout phase	1–1	—	2–1	2–2
3	(Czech Republic) Sparta Prague	6	2	0	4	10	12	−2	6		0–1	1–4	—	4–1
4	(Scotland) Celtic	6	1	1	4	10	19	−9	4		1–3	3–2	1–4	—

Source: UEFA
Rules for classification: Group stage tiebreakers

22 October 2020 1	Celtic (Scotland)	1–3	(Italy) Milan	Glasgow, Scotland
21:00 CEST (UTC+2)	Laxalt (yellow card) 65'; Elyounoussi 76'; Christie (yellow card) 86'	Report	Krunić 14'; Brahim 42'; Tonali (yellow card) 82'; G. Donnarumma (yellow card) 83'; Saelemaekers (yellow card) 88'; Hauge 90+2'	Stadium: Celtic Park; Attendance: 316; Referee: Matej Jug (Slovenia)

29 October 2020 2	Milan (Italy)	3–0	(Czech Republic) Sparta Prague	Milan, Italy
18:55 CET (UTC+1)	Brahim 24'; Leão 57'; Dalot 67'	Report	Dočkal (yellow card) 28'; Lischka (yellow card) 36'; Pavelka (yellow card) 52'	Stadium: San Siro; Attendance: 0 Referee: Halis Özkahya (Turkey)

5 November 2020 3	Milan (Italy)	0–3	(France) Lille	Milan, Italy
21:00 CET (UTC+1)	Romagnoli (yellow card) 84'	Report	Yazıcı 22' (pen.), 55', 58'; Xeka (yellow card) 36'; Çelik (yellow card) 75'	Stadium: San Siro; Attendance: 0 Referee: Bartosz Frankowski (Poland)

26 November 2020 4	Lille (France)	1–1	(Italy) Milan	Villeneuve-d'Ascq, France
18:55 CET (UTC+1)	Pied (yellow card) 12'; Xeka (yellow card) 28'; Bamba 65'; Soumaré (yellow card) 67'	Report	Bennacer (yellow card) 45+1'; Castillejo 46'; Brahim (yellow card) 90+1'	Stadium: Stade Pierre-Mauroy; Attendance: 0 Referee: Craig Pawson (England)

3 December 2020 5	Milan (Italy)	4–2	(Scotland) Celtic	Milan, Italy
18:55 CET (UTC+1)	Çalhanoğlu 24'; Castillejo 26'; Hauge 50'; Brahim 82'	Report	Rogic 7', (yellow card) 67'; Édouard 14'; Christie (yellow card) 23'; Brown (yellow card) 75'	Stadium: San Siro; Attendance: 0 Referee: Ricardo de Burgos Bengoetxea (Spain)

10 December 2020 6	Sparta Prague (Czech Republic)	0–1	(Italy) Milan	Prague, Czech Republic
21:00 CET (UTC+1)	Sáček (yellow card) 15'; Polidar (yellow card) 45'; Plechatý (red card) 77'; Heča (yellow card) 77'	Report	Hauge 23'; Krunić (yellow card) 35'; Maldini (yellow card) 49'; Castillejo (yellow card) 85'	Stadium: Stadion Letná; Attendance: 0 Referee: Daniel Siebert (Germany)

==== Knockout phase ====
===== Round of 32 =====
The draw for the round of 32 was held on 14 December 2020.

18 February 2021 First leg	Red Star Belgrade (Serbia)	2–2	(Italy) Milan	Belgrade, Serbia
18:55 CET (UTC+1)	Kanga 52' (pen.); Milunović (yellow card) 54'; Rodić (yellow card) 57' (yellow-red card) 77'; Pavkov 90+3'	Report	Pankov 42' (o.g.); Romagnoli (yellow card) 51'; Hernandez 61' (pen.); Mandžukić (yellow card) 71'; G. Donnarumma (yellow card) 90+3'	Stadium: Red Star Stadium; Attendance: 0 Referee: Anastasios Sidiropoulos (Greece)

25 February 2021 Second leg	Milan (Italy)	1–1 (3 (a) –3 agg.)	(Serbia) Red Star Belgrade	Milan, Italy
21:00 CET (UTC+1)	Kessié 9' (pen.); Ibrahimović (yellow card) 63'	Report	Gobeljić (yellow card) 8' (yellow-red card) 70'; Ben 24'; Srnić (yellow card) 45'	Stadium: San Siro; Attendance: 0 Referee: Jesús Gil Manzano (Spain)

===== Round of 16 =====
The draw for the round of 16 was held on 26 February 2021.

11 March 2021 First leg	Manchester United (England)	1–1	(Italy) Milan	Manchester, England
17:55 GMT (UTC±0)	Amad 50'; McTominay (yellow card) 55'	Report	Saelemaekers (yellow card) 19'; Kjær 90+2'	Stadium: Old Trafford; Attendance: 0 Referee: Slavko Vinčić (Slovenia)

18 March 2021 Second leg	Milan (Italy)	0–1 (1–2 agg.)	(England) Manchester United	Milan, Italy
21:00 CET (UTC+1)	Kalulu (yellow card) 65'; Dalot (yellow card) 77'; Kjær (yellow card) 85'; Hernandez (yellow card) 90+5'	Report	Pogba 49'; Shaw (yellow card) 90+3'	Stadium: San Siro; Attendance: 0 Referee: Felix Brych (Germany)

== Statistics ==
=== Appearances and goals ===
No.	Pos	Nat	Player	Total		Serie A		Coppa Italia		Europa League	
No.	Pos	Nat	Player	Apps	Goals	Apps	Goals	Apps	Goals	Apps	Goals
Goalkeepers
1	GK	(Romania) ROU	Ciprian Tătărușanu	5	0	1	0	2	0	2	0
90	GK	(Italy) ITA	Antonio Donnarumma	0	0	0	0	0	0	0	0
99	GK	(Italy) ITA	Gianluigi Donnarumma	48	0	37	0	0	0	11	0
Defenders
2	DF	(Italy) ITA	Davide Calabria	39	2	30+2	2	1	0	6	0
5	DF	(Portugal) POR	Diogo Dalot	33	2	10+11	1	2	0	8+2	1
13	DF	(Italy) ITA	Alessio Romagnoli	30	1	21+1	1	2	0	5+1	0
19	DF	(France) FRA	Théo Hernandez	45	8	33	7	1+1	0	9+1	1
20	DF	(France) FRA	Pierre Kalulu	18	1	7+6	1	1	0	3+1	0
23	DF	(England) ENG	Fikayo Tomori	22	1	16+1	1	0+1	0	4	0
24	DF	(Denmark) DEN	Simon Kjær	39	1	28	0	1	0	10	1
46	DF	(Italy) ITA	Matteo Gabbia	13	0	7+1	0	0	0	5	0
Midfielders
4	MF	(Algeria) ALG	Ismaël Bennacer	30	0	17+4	0	0	0	6+3	0
7	MF	(Spain) ESP	Samu Castillejo	43	3	12+16	1	2	0	13	2
8	MF	(Italy) ITA	Sandro Tonali	37	0	17+8	0	1	0	5+6	0
10	MF	(Turkey) TUR	Hakan Çalhanoğlu	43	9	31+2	4	0+1	0	7+2	5
18	MF	(France) FRA	Soualiho Meïté	21	0	4+12	0	1	0	4	0
21	MF	(Spain) ESP	Brahim Díaz	39	7	15+12	4	2	0	4+6	3
27	MF	(Italy) ITA	Daniel Maldini	9	0	0+5	0	0	0	2+2	0
33	MF	(Bosnia and Herzegovina) BIH	Rade Krunić	38	2	5+20	1	1	0	9+3	1
56	MF	(Belgium) BEL	Alexis Saelemaekers	38	3	25+5	2	1	0	5+2	1
79	MF	(Ivory Coast) CIV	Franck Kessié	50	14	36+1	13	1+1	0	9+2	1
92	MF	(Italy) ITA	Giacomo Olzer	1	0	0	0	0+1	0	0	0
Forwards
9	FW	(Croatia) CRO	Mario Mandžukić	11	0	1+9	0	0	0	1	0
11	FW	(Sweden) SWE	Zlatan Ibrahimović	27	17	18+1	15	2	1	4+2	1
12	FW	(Croatia) CRO	Ante Rebić	33	11	20+7	11	1	0	3+2	0
15	FW	(Norway) NOR	Jens Petter Hauge	24	5	3+15	2	0+1	0	3+2	3
17	FW	(Portugal) POR	Rafael Leão	40	7	22+8	6	2	0	2+6	1
Players transferred out during the season
14	DF	(Italy) ITA	Andrea Conti	5	0	0+3	0	0	0	1+1	0
22	DF	(Argentina) ARG	Mateo Musacchio	2	0	1	0	1	0	0	0
29	FW	(Italy) ITA	Lorenzo Colombo	9	1	1+3	0	0	0	2+3	1
39	MF	(Brazil) BRA	Lucas Paquetá	0	0	0	0	0	0	0	0
43	DF	(Brazil) BRA	Léo Duarte	3	0	0+1	0	0	0	1+1	0
93	DF	(Uruguay) URU	Diego Laxalt	0	0	0	0	0	0	0	0

Source: Competitions

=== Goalscorers ===
Rank	No.	Pos.	Name	Serie A	Coppa Italia	Europa League	Total
1	11	FW	(Sweden) Zlatan Ibrahimović	15	1	1	17
2	79	MF	(Ivory Coast) Franck Kessié	13	0	1	14
3	12	FW	(Croatia) Ante Rebić	11	0	0	11
4	10	MF	(Turkey) Hakan Çalhanoğlu	4	0	5	9
5	19	DF	(France) Théo Hernandez	7	0	1	8
6	17	FW	(Portugal) Rafael Leão	6	0	1	7
6	21	MF	(Spain) Brahim Díaz	4	0	3	7
8	15	FW	(Norway) Jens Petter Hauge	2	0	3	5
9	7	MF	(Spain) Samu Castillejo	1	0	2	3
9	56	MF	(Belgium) Alexis Saelemaekers	2	0	1	3
11	2	DF	(Italy) Davide Calabria	2	0	0	2
11	5	DF	(Portugal) Diogo Dalot	1	0	1	2
11	33	MF	(Bosnia and Herzegovina) Rade Krunić	1	0	1	2
14	13	DF	(Italy) Alessio Romagnoli	1	0	0	1
14	20	DF	(France) Pierre Kalulu	1	0	0	1
14	23	FW	(England) Fikayo Tomori	1	0	0	1
14	24	DF	(Denmark) Simon Kjaer	0	0	1	1
14	29	FW	(Italy) Lorenzo Colombo	0	0	1	1
Own goals				2	0	1	3
Totals				74	1	23	98

Players in italics left the team during the season

=== Assists ===
Rank	No.	Pos	Nat	Name	Serie A	Coppa Italia	Europa League	Total
1	10	MF	(Turkey)	Hakan Çalhanoğlu	9	0	2	11
2	19	DF	(France)	Théo Hernandez	5	0	2	7
3	12	FW	(Croatia)	Ante Rebić	4	0	2	6
3	17	FW	(Portugal)	Rafael Leão	6	0	0	6
5	56	MF	(Belgium)	Alexis Saelemaekers	3	0	2	5
6	4	MF	(Algeria)	Ismaël Bennacer	2	0	2	4
6	79	MF	(Ivory Coast)	Franck Kessié	4	0	0	4
6	5	DF	(Portugal)	Diogo Dalot	1	0	2	4
6	11	FW	(Sweden)	Zlatan Ibrahimović	2	0	1	4
9	7	FW	(Spain)	Samu Castillejo	0	0	2	2
9	21	MF	(Spain)	Brahim Díaz	3	0	0	2
9	24	DF	(Denmark)	Simon Kjaer	2	0	0	2
13	2	DF	(Italy)	Davide Calabria	1	0	0	1
13	13	DF	(Italy)	Alessio Romagnoli	1	0	0	1
13	15	FW	(Norway)	Jens Petter Hauge	0	0	1	1
13	18	MF	(France)	Soualiho Meïté	0	1	0	1
13	33	MF	(Bosnia and Herzegovina)	Rade Krunić	2	0	1	1
13	20	DF	(France)	Pierre Kalulu	1	0	0	1
Totals					46	1	17	64

=== Clean sheets ===
Rank	No.	Pos	Nat	Name	Serie A	Coppa Italia	Europa League	Total
1	99	GK	(Italy)	Gianluigi Donnarumma	14	0	1	15
2	1	GK	(Romania)	Ciprian Tătărușanu	0	1	2	3
Totals					14	1	3	18

=== Disciplinary record ===
No.	Pos	Nat	Name	Serie A			Coppa Italia			Europa League			Total		
No.	Pos	Nat	Name	Yellow card	(yellow card) (yellow-red card)	Red card	Yellow card	(yellow card) (yellow-red card)	Red card	Yellow card	(yellow card) (yellow-red card)	Red card	Yellow card	(yellow card) (yellow-red card)	Red card
19	DF	(France)	Théo Hernandez	9						2			11		
79	MF	(Ivory Coast)	Franck Kessié	8			2						10		
13	DF	(Italy)	Alessio Romagnoli	7						2			9		
56	MF	(Belgium)	Alexis Saelemaekers	5	1					2			7	1	
2	DF	(Italy)	Davide Calabria	7									7		
17	FW	(Portugal)	Rafael Leão	5						1			6		
24	DF	(Denmark)	Simon Kjær	3			1			2			6		
12	FW	(Croatia)	Ante Rebić	4		1	1						5		1
7	FW	(Spain)	Samu Castillejo	5									5		
5	DF	(Portugal)	Diogo Dalot	4						1			5		
4	MF	(Algeria)	Ismael Bennacer	4						1			5		
33	MF	(Bosnia and Herzegovina)	Rade Krunić	3						1			4		
10	MF	(Turkey)	Hakan Çalhanoğlu	4									4		
11	FW	(Sweden)	Zlatan Ibrahimović	2		1		1		1			3	1	1
99	GK	(Italy)	Gianluigi Donnarumma	1					1	2			3		1
8	MF	(Italy)	Sandro Tonali	1		1	1			1			3		1
46	DF	(Italy)	Matteo Gabbia	2									2		
18	MF	(France)	Soualiho Meïté	2									2		
20	DF	(France)	Pierre Kalulu	1						1			2		
21	MF	(Spain)	Brahim Diaz	1						1			2		
9	FW	(Croatia)	Mario Mandžukić	1						1			2		
27	FW	(Italy)	Daniel Maldini							1			1		
Totals				60	1	1	5	1	1	16	0	0	81	2	2

Updated as per 23 May 2021

== Goal of the season ==
Winner: Ante Rebić (vs. Juventus)

Runner-up: Brahim Díaz (vs. Juventus)

Third/ fourth place: Rafael Leão (vs. Benevento) and Fikayo Tomori (vs. Juventus)
