= 2021–22 AC Milan season =

Milan
2021–22 season
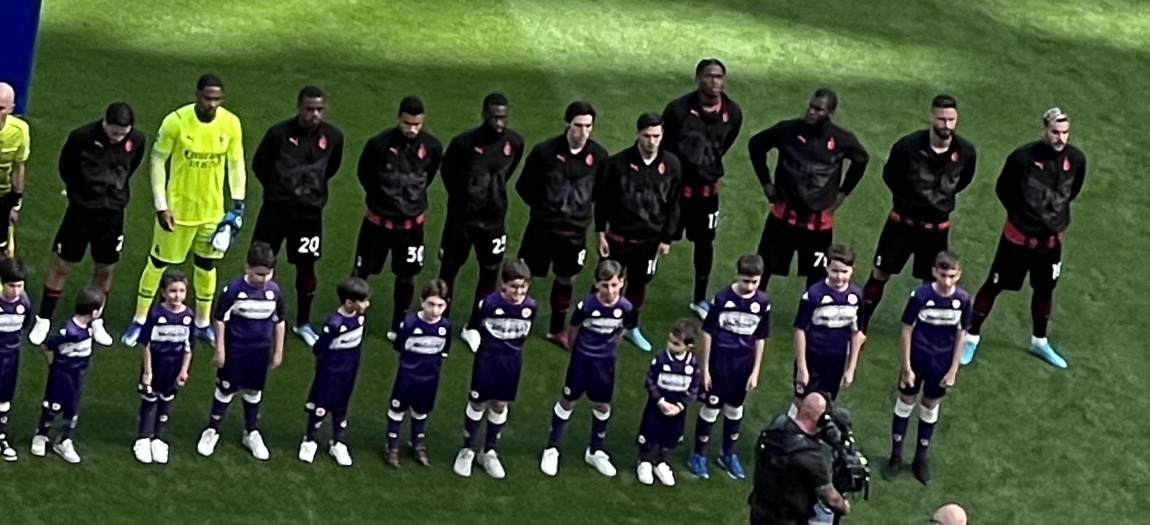
- Chairman: Paolo Scaroni
- Head coach: Stefano Pioli
- Stadium: San Siro
- Serie A: 1st
- Coppa Italia: Semi-finals
- UEFA Champions League: Group stage
- Top goalscorer: League: Olivier Giroud; Rafael Leão (11 each); All: Olivier Giroud; Rafael Leão (14 each)
- Average home league attendance: 42,478
- Biggest win: Milan 4–0 Lazio
- Biggest defeat: Internazionale 3–0 Milan
Home colours	Away colours	Third colours

The 2021–22 season was the 123rd season in the existence of AC Milan and the club's 39th consecutive season (110th overall) in the top flight of Italian football. In addition to the domestic league, Milan participated in this season's editions of the Coppa Italia and UEFA Champions League. It marked Milan's return to Europe's premier knockout competition for the first time since the 2013–14 season.

Milan secured their 19th Italian league title on the last match day of the season, with a club-record tally of 86 points. It was their first league title since the 2010–11 season.

== Players ==
=== Squad information ===
As of 30 June 2022.

No.	Player	Nat.	Position(s)	Date of birth (age)	Signed in	Contract ends	Signed from	Transfer fee	Notes	Apps	Goals
Goalkeepers
1	Ciprian Tătăruşanu	(Romania)	GK	9 February 1986 (aged 36)	2020	2023	(France) Lyon	€500,000		14	0
16	Mike Maignan	(France)	GK	3 July 1995 (aged 26)	2021	2026	(France) Lille	€13,000,000		40	0
83	Antonio Mirante	(Italy)	GK	8 July 1983 (aged 38)	2021	2022	(Italy) Roma	Free		0	0
Defenders
2	Davide Calabria (vice-captain)	(Italy)	RB / LB / CM	6 December 1996 (aged 25)	2015	2025	(Italy) Youth System	Free	From Youth system	185	7
5	Fodé Ballo-Touré	(Senegal)	LB / LM	3 January 1997 (aged 25)	2021	2025	(France) Monaco	€4,200,000		11	0
13	Alessio Romagnoli (captain)	(Italy)	CB / LB	12 January 1995 (aged 27)	2015	2022	(Italy) Roma	€25,000,000	Captain	247	10
19	Théo Hernandez	(France)	LB / LM	6 October 1997 (aged 24)	2019	2026	(Spain) Real Madrid	€20,000,000		122	19
20	Pierre Kalulu	(France)	RB / CB	5 June 2000 (aged 22)	2020	2025	(France) Lyon II	€480,000		55	3
23	Fikayo Tomori	(England)	CB / RB	19 December 1997 (aged 24)	2021	2025	(England) Chelsea	€28,500,000		62	2
24	Simon Kjær	(Denmark)	CB	26 March 1989 (aged 33)	2020	2024	(Spain) Sevilla	€2,500,000		72	1
25	Alessandro Florenzi	(Italy)	RB / RM / RW	11 March 1991 (aged 31)	2021	2022	(Italy) Roma	€1,000,000	Loan	29	2
46	Matteo Gabbia	(Italy)	CB / RB / DM	21 October 1999 (aged 22)	2017	2023	(Italy) Youth System	Free	From Youth system	33	0
Midfielders
4	Ismaël Bennacer	(Algeria)	DM / CM	1 December 1997 (aged 24)	2019	2024	(Italy) Empoli	€16,000,000		105	3
8	Sandro Tonali	(Italy)	CM / DM	8 May 2000 (aged 22)	2020	2026	(Italy) Brescia	€20,000,000		83	5
10	Brahim Diaz	(Spain)	AM / RW / LW	3 August 1999 (aged 22)	2020	2023	(Spain) Real Madrid	€3,000,000	Loan	67	7
27	Daniel Maldini	(Italy)	AM / LW / RW	11 October 2001 (aged 20)	2020	2024	(Italy) Youth System	Free	From Youth system	25	1
33	Rade Krunić	(Bosnia and Herzegovina)	AM / CM / LM	7 October 1993 (aged 28)	2019	2024	(Italy) Empoli	€8,000,000		91	2
41	Tiémoué Bakayoko	(France)	DM / CM	17 August 1994 (aged 27)	2021	2023	(England) Chelsea	Free	Loan	49	1
56	Alexis Saelemaekers	(Belgium)	RW / LW / RB	27 June 1999 (aged 23)	2020	2026	(Belgium) Anderlecht	€7,200,000		101	6
79	Franck Kessié	(Ivory Coast)	CM / DM	19 December 1996 (aged 25)	2017	2022	(Italy) Atalanta	€28,000,000		223	38
Forwards
7	Samu Castillejo	(Spain)	RW / LW / SS	18 January 1995 (aged 27)	2018	2023	(Spain) Villarreal	€25,000,000		113	10
9	Olivier Giroud	(France)	ST	30 September 1986 (aged 35)	2021	2023	(England) Chelsea	€1,000,000		38	16
11	Zlatan Ibrahimović	(Sweden)	ST	3 October 1981 (aged 40)	2020	2022	(United States) LA Galaxy	Free		159	92
12	Ante Rebić	(Croatia)	LW / ST / SS	21 September 1993 (aged 28)	2019	2025	(Germany) Eintracht Frankfurt	Undisclosed		92	26
17	Rafael Leão	(Portugal)	LW / ST / RW	10 June 1999 (aged 23)	2019	2024	(France) Lille	€28,000,000		116	28
22	Marko Lazetić	(Serbia)	ST	22 January 2004 (aged 18)	2022	2026	(Serbia) Red Star Belgrade	€4,000,000		1	0
30	Junior Messias	(Brazil)	AM / RW / SS	13 May 1991 (aged 31)	2021	2022	(Italy) Crotone	€2,600,000	Loan	33	6

== Transfers ==
=== Summer window ===
Deals officialised beforehand were effective starting from 1 July 2021.

==== In ====
Date	Pos.	Player	A.	Moving from	Fee	Notes	Source
27 May 2021	GK	(France) Mike Maignan	25	(France) Lille	€13.0M		
16 June 2021	DF	(England) Fikayo Tomori	23	(England) Chelsea	€28.5M	From loan to definitive purchase	
8 July 2021	MF	(Italy) Sandro Tonali	21	(Italy) Brescia	€10.0M	From loan to definitive purchase	
17 July 2021	FW	(France) Olivier Giroud	34	(England) Chelsea	€1.0M		
18 July 2021	DF	(Senegal) Fodé Ballo-Touré	24	(France) Monaco	€4.2M		
30 August 2021	MF	(Ivory Coast) Chaka Traorè	16	(Italy) Parma	€0.6M	Joined Primavera squad	
31 August 2021	MF	(France) Yacine Adli	21	(France) Bordeaux	€8.0M	Promptly re-loaned	
13 October 2021	GK	(Italy) Antonio Mirante	38	(Italy) Roma	Free	Free agent	

==== Loan in ====
Date	Pos.	Player	A.	Moving from	Fee	Notes	Source
19 July 2021	MF	(Spain) Brahim Díaz	21	(Spain) Real Madrid	€3.0M	Loan renewal + option to buy	
21 August 2021	DF	(Italy) Alessandro Florenzi	30	(Italy) Roma	€1.0M	Loan with option to buy	
25 August 2021	FW	(Italy) Pietro Pellegri	20	(France) Monaco	€1.0M	Loan with option to buy	
30 August 2021	MF	(France) Tiémoué Bakayoko	27	(England) Chelsea	€2.0M	Loan with option to buy	
31 August 2021	MF	(Brazil) Junior Messias	30	(Italy) Crotone	€2.6M	Loan with option to buy	

==== Loan returns ====
Date	Pos.	Player	A.	Moving from	Fee	Notes	Source
30 June 2021	GK	(Italy) Alessandro Plizzari	21	(Italy) Reggina			
30 June 2021	DF	(Germany) Lenny Borges	20	(Germany) Bayern Munich II		Re-joined Primavera team	
30 June 2021	DF	(Italy) Andrea Conti	27	(Italy) Parma			
30 June 2021	MF	(Croatia) (Italy) Emir Murati	21	(Italy) Vibonese			

Total spending:▼74.9M

==== Out ====
Date	Pos.	Player	A.	Moving to	Fee	Notes	Source
22 June 2021	DF	(Uruguay) Diego Laxalt	28	(Russia) Dynamo Moscow	€3.5M	After return from loan	
30 June 2021	MF	(Turkey) Hakan Çalhanoğlu	26	(Italy) Internazionale	Free	Free agent	
30 June 2021	GK	(Italy) Antonio Donnarumma	30	(Italy) Padova	Free	Free agent	
30 June 2021	GK	(Italy) Gianluigi Donnarumma	22	(France) Paris Saint-Germain	Free	Free agent	
30 June 2021	FW	(Croatia) Mario Mandžukić	35	Unattached	Free	Retired	
9 July 2021	MF	(Italy) Giacomo Olzer	20	(Italy) Brescia	€3.0M	With buy-back option	
31 July 2021	MF	(Italy) Alessio Brambilla	20	(Italy) Cesena	Undisclosed	From Primavera squad	

==== Loans ended ====
Date	Pos.	Player	A.	Moving to	Fee	Notes	Source
30 June 2021	DF	(Portugal) Diogo Dalot	22	(England) Manchester United			
30 June 2021	MF	(France) Soualiho Meïté	27	(Italy) Torino			

==== Loans out ====
Date	Pos.	Player	A.	Moving to	Fee	Notes	Source
10 June 2021	MF	(Italy) Marco Brescianini	21	(Italy) Monza	Free	After return from loan	
14 July 2021	DF	(Greece) Nikos Michelis	20	(Netherlands) Willem II	Free	From Primavera squad	
14 July 2021	FW	(Italy) (Cameroon) Frank Tsadjout	21	(Italy) Pordenone	Free	After return from loan	
16 July 2021	MF	(Italy) Alessandro Sala	20	(Italy) Renate	Free	After return from loan	
21 July 2021	DF	(Italy) Riccardo Oddi	19	(Italy) Trento	Free	From Primavera squad	
26 July 2021	FW	(Italy) Gabriele Capanni	20	(Italy) Ternana	Free	After return from loan	
27 July 2021	GK	(Italy) Leonardo Moleri	19	(Italy) Renate	Free	From Primavera squad	
28 July 2021	DF	(Italy) Gabriele Galardi	19	(Italy) Nuova Florida	Free	After return from loan	
29 July 2021	FW	(Italy) Riccardo Tonin	20	(Italy) Cesena	Free	From Primavera squad	
30 July 2021	FW	(Brazil) Luan Capanni	21	(Italy) Viterbese	Free	After return from loan	
31 July 2021	FW	(Italy) Lorenzo Colombo	19	(Italy) SPAL	Free	After return from loan	
9 August 2021	DF	(Italy) Mattia Caldara	27	(Italy) Venezia	Free	After return from loan	
10 August 2021	FW	(Norway) Jens Petter Hauge	21	(Germany) Eintracht Frankfurt	Free		
12 August 2021	MF	(Italy) Marco Frigerio	20	(Italy) Lucchese	Free	From Primavera squad	
20 August 2021	FW	(Italy) Sabino Signorile	19	(Italy) Seregno	Free	From Primavera squad	
27 August 2021	MF	(Italy) Tommaso Pobega	22	(Italy) Torino	Free	After return from loan	
29 August 2021	MF	(Croatia) Antonio Mionić	20	(Italy) Montevarchi	Free	From Primavera squad	
31 August 2021	DF	(France) (Cameroon) Leroy Abanda	21	(France) Boulogne	Free	From Primavera squad	
31 August 2021	MF	(France) Yacine Adli	21	(France) Bordeaux	Free	Loaned after purchase	

Total income:▲€6.5M

=== Winter window ===
Deals officialised beforehand were effective starting from 1 January 2022.

==== In ====
Date	Pos.	Player	A.	Moving from	Fee	Notes	Source
22 January 2022	FW	(Italy) (Nigeria) Bob Murphy Omoregbe	18	(Italy) Borgosesia	€0.1M	Joined Primavera team	
26 January 2022	FW	(Serbia) Marko Lazetić	18	(Serbia) Red Star Belgrade	€4M		

==== Loan returns ====
Date	Pos.	Player	A.	Moving from	Fee	Notes	Source
31 January 2022	GK	(Italy) Leonardo Moleri	20	(Italy) Renate	Free	Re-joined Primavera squad	

Total spending:▼4.1M

==== Out ====
Date	Pos.	Player	A.	Moving to	Fee	Notes	Source
10 January 2022	DF	(Italy) Andrea Conti	27	(Italy) Sampdoria	Free		
21 January 2021	MF	(Italy) (United States) Kevin Bright	17	(Italy) Cremonese	Undisclosed	From Primavera squad	
22 January 2021	MF	(Italy) Alessandro Sala	19	(Italy) Pro Sesto	Undisclosed	After anticipated return from loan	
28 January 2021	DF	(Hungary) Milos Kerkez	17	(Netherlands) AZ Alkmaar	€2M	From Primavera squad	
31 January 2021	MF	(Italy) Jordan Amore	17	(Italy) Pescara	Undisclosed	From Primavera squad	

==== Loans end ====
Date	Pos.	Player	A.	Moving to	Fee	Notes	Source
25 January 2022	FW	(Italy) Pietro Pellegri	20	(France) Monaco	Free	Anticipated end of loan	

==== Loans out ====
Date	Pos.	Player	A.	Moving to	Fee	Notes	Source
5 January 2022	FW	(Italy) (Cameroon) Frank Tsadjout	22	(Italy) Ascoli	Free	After anticipated return from loan	
22 January 2022	FW	(Brazil) Luan Capanni	21	(Italy) Grosseto	Free	After anticipated return from loan	
28 January 2022	DF	(Italy) Gabriele Galardi	19	(Italy) Gravina	Free	After anticipated return from loan	
29 January 2022	GK	(Italy) Alessandro Plizzari	21	(Italy) Lecce	Free		

Total income:▲€2.0M

== Pre-season and friendlies ==
Win Draw Loss Fixtures

17 July 2021 Friendly	Milan	6–0	Pro Sesto	Carnago, Italy
17:00 CEST (UTC+2)	Bennacer 19'; Leão 22'; Castillejo 38'; Serra 75' (o.g.); Kerkez 88', 90+1'	Report		Stadium: Milanello; Attendance: 0 Referee: Alessandro Di Graci

24 July 2021 Friendly	Milan	5–0	Modena	Carnago, Italy
17:00 CEST (UTC+2)	Brahim 2'; Leão 5'; Tomori 9'; Krunić 19'; Hernandez 42'	Report		Stadium: Milanello

31 July 2021 Friendly	Nice	1–1	Milan	Nice, France
21:00 CEST (UTC+2)	Kluivert (yellow card) 29'; Gouiri 59' (pen.)	Report	Tonali (yellow card) 21'; Hernandez (yellow card) 31'; Giroud 66'	Stadium: Allianz Riviera; Referee: Florent Batta

4 August 2021 Friendly	Valencia	0–0 (5–3 p)	Milan	Valencia, Spain
20:30 CEST (UTC+2)	Correia (yellow card) 60'	Report	Krunić (yellow card) 84'; Gabbia (yellow card) 90+1'	Stadium: Mestalla; Attendance: 3,000; Referee: Mario Melero López
	Penalties
	Vallejo (penalty scored); Gómez (penalty scored); Guedes (penalty scored); Esquerdo (penalty scored); Guillamón (penalty scored)		(penalty scored) Giroud; (penalty scored) Calabria; (penalty missed) Krunić; (penalty scored) Rebić

8 August 2021 Friendly	Real Madrid	0–0	Milan	Klagenfurt, Austria
18:30 CEST (UTC+2)	Bale (penalty missed) 41'	Report	Calabria (yellow card) 40'	Stadium: Wörthersee Stadion; Referee: Walter Altmann

14 August 2021 Friendly	Milan	2–1	Panathinaikos	Trieste, Italy
20:30 CEST (UTC+2)	Giroud 16', 43'	Report	Ioannidis 77'	Stadium: Stadio Nereo Rocco; Referee: Daniele Chiffi

== Competitions ==
=== Overall record ===
Competition	First match	Last match	Starting round	Final position	Record							
Competition	First match	Last match	Starting round	Final position	Pld	W	D	L	GF	GA	GD	Win %
Serie A	23 August 2021	22 May 2022	Matchday 1	Winners	38	26	8	4	69	31	+38	68.42
Coppa Italia	13 January 2022	19 April 2022	Round of 16	Semi-finals	4	2	1	1	7	4	+3	50.00
UEFA Champions League	15 September 2021	7 December 2021	Group stage	Group stage	6	1	1	4	6	9	−3	16.67
Total					48	29	10	9	82	44	+38	60.42

Source: Soccerway

=== Serie A ===
==== League table ====
Pos	Team	Pld	W	D	L	GF	GA	GD	Pts	Qualification or relegation
1	Milan (C)	38	26	8	4	69	31	+38	86	Qualification for the Champions League group stage
2	Inter Milan	38	25	9	4	84	32	+52	84	Qualification for the Champions League group stage
3	Napoli	38	24	7	7	74	31	+43	79	Qualification for the Champions League group stage
4	Juventus	38	20	10	8	57	37	+20	70	Qualification for the Champions League group stage
5	Lazio	38	18	10	10	77	58	+19	64	Qualification for the Europa League group stage (Note: Since the winners of the 2021–22 Coppa Italia, Inter Milan, qualified for the Champions League, the Europa League berth awarded to the Coppa Italia winners was passed to the sixth-placed team, and the Europa Conference League berth awarded to the sixth-placed team was passed to the seventh-placed team.)

Source: Serie A
Rules for classification: 1) Points; 2) Head-to-head points; 3) Head-to-head goal difference; 4) Goal difference; 5) Goals scored; 6) Draw. (Note: Head-to-head record is used only after all the matches between the teams in question have been played)
(C) Champions

==== Results summary ====
Overall								Home						Away					
Pld	W	D	L	GF	GA	GD	Pts	W	D	L	GF	GA	GD	W	D	L	GF	GA	GD
38	26	8	4	69	31	+38	86	12	4	3	28	12	+16	14	4	1	41	19	+22

Source: Serie A

==== Results by round ====
Round	1	2	3	4	5	6	7	8	9	10	11	12	13	14	15	16	17	18	19	20	21	22	23	24	25	26	27	28	29	30	31	32	33	34	35	36	37	38
Ground	A	H	H	A	H	A	A	H	A	H	A	H	A	H	A	H	A	H	A	H	A	H	H	A	H	A	H	A	H	A	H	A	H	A	H	A	H	A
Result	W	W	W	D	W	W	W	W	W	W	W	D	L	L	W	W	D	L	W	W	W	L	D	W	W	D	D	W	W	W	D	D	W	W	W	W	W	W
Position	8	4	2	3	3	2	2	2	2	2	2	2	2	2	2	1	2	3	2	2	2	2	3	3	1	1	2	1	1	1	1	1	1	1	1	1	1	1

Source: Serie A
A = Away; H = Home; W = Win; D = Draw; L = Loss

==== Matches ====
The league fixtures were announced on 14 July 2021.

23 August 2021 1	Sampdoria	0–1	Milan	Genoa
20:45 CEST (UTC+2)	Gabbiadini (yellow card) 33'; Murru (yellow card) 89'; Bereszyński (yellow card) 90+3'	Report	Brahim 9'; Kjær (yellow card) 86'	Stadium: Stadio Luigi Ferraris; Attendance: 4,966; Referee: Marco Guida

29 August 2021 2	Milan	4–1	Cagliari	Milan
20:45 CEST (UTC+2)	Tonali 12'; Leão 17'; Giroud 24', 43' (pen.); Brahim (yellow card) 73'	Report	Dalbert (yellow card) 5'; Deiola 15', (yellow card) 38'; Strootman (yellow card) 41'; Godín (yellow card) 62'; Nández (yellow card) 84'	Stadium: San Siro; Attendance: 31,946; Referee: Marco Serra

12 September 2021 3	Milan	2–0	Lazio	Milan
18:00 CEST (UTC+2)	Leão 45'; Kessié (penalty missed) 45+6'; Bakayoko (yellow card) 63'; Ibrahimović 67'	Report	Marušić (yellow card) 17'; Reina (yellow card) 45+5'; Luis Alberto (yellow card) 45+7'; Hysaj (yellow card) 57'	Stadium: San Siro; Attendance: 36,207; Referee: Daniele Chiffi

19 September 2021 4	Juventus	1–1	Milan	Turin
20:45 CEST (UTC+2)	Morata 4'; Dybala (yellow card) 65'	Report	Tonali (yellow card) 65'; Rebić 76'	Stadium: Juventus Stadium; Attendance: 18,785; Referee: Daniele Doveri

22 September 2021 5	Milan	2–0	Venezia	Milan
20:45 CEST (UTC+2)	Brahim 68'; Hernandez 82'	Report	Forte (yellow card) 25'; Caldara (yellow card) 77'	Stadium: San Siro; Attendance: 26,185; Referee: Ivano Pezzuto

25 September 2021 6	Spezia	1–2	Milan	La Spezia
15:00 CEST (UTC+2)	Sala (yellow card) 25'; Verde 80'; Nikolaou (yellow card) 89'	Report	Maldini 48', (yellow card) 58'; Brahim 87'; Hernandez (yellow card) 90'	Stadium: Stadio Alberto Picco; Attendance: 5,700; Referee: Gianluca Manganiello

3 October 2021 7	Atalanta	2–3	Milan	Bergamo
20:45 CEST (UTC+2)	De Roon (yellow card) 40'; Zapata 86' (pen.); Pašalić 90+4'	Report	Calabria 1'; Brahim (yellow card) 42'; Tonali 43'; Tomori (yellow card) 52'; Leão 78', (yellow card) 88'; Messias (yellow card) 85'	Stadium: Gewiss Stadium; Attendance: 9,363; Referee: Marco Di Bello

16 October 2021 8	Milan	3–2	Hellas Verona	Milan
20:45 CEST (UTC+2)	Giroud 59'; Kessié 76' (pen.); Günter 78' (o.g.); Ballo-Touré (yellow card) 81'	Report	Ceccherini (yellow card) 5'; Caprari 7'; Barák 24' (pen.); Kalinić (yellow card) 25'; Casale (yellow card) 38'; Veloso (yellow card) 54'	Stadium: San Siro; Attendance: 40,128; Referee: Alessandro Prontera

23 October 2021 9	Bologna	2–4	Milan	Bologna
20:45 CEST (UTC+2)	Soumaoro (red card) 20'; Arnautović (yellow card) 34'; Ibrahimović 49' (o.g.); Barrow 52'; Soriano (red card) 58'	Report	Leão 16'; Calabria 35', (yellow card) 61'; Tonali (yellow card) 45+1'; Saelemaekers (yellow card) 67'; Bennacer 84'; Ibrahimović 90'	Stadium: Stadio Renato Dall'Ara; Attendance: 22,167; Referee: Paolo Valeri

26 October 2021 10	Milan	1–0	Torino	Milan
20:45 CEST (UTC+2)	Romagnoli (yellow card) 10'; Giroud 14'; Kalulu (yellow card) 34'; Bakayoko (yellow card) 90+3'	Report	Buongiorno (yellow card) 5'; Singo (yellow card) 24'; Pobega (yellow card) 57'	Stadium: San Siro; Attendance: 35,929; Referee: Gianluca Aureliano

31 October 2021 11	Roma	1–2	Milan	Rome
20:45 CET (UTC+1)	Zaniolo (yellow card) 7'; Karsdorp (yellow card) 24'; Mancini (yellow card) 49'; El Shaarawy 90+3'; Veretout (yellow card) 90+7'	Report	Ibrahimović 26', (yellow card) 27'; Hernandez (yellow card) 41' (yellow-red card) 66'; Kessié 57' (pen.), (yellow card) 81'; Tomori (yellow card) 65'; Calabria (yellow card) 67'; Giroud (yellow card) 77'	Stadium: Stadio Olimpico; Attendance: 51,001; Referee: Fabio Maresca

7 November 2021 12	Milan	1–1	Internazionale	Milan
20:45 CET (UTC+1)	De Vrij 17' (o.g.); Ballo-Touré (yellow card) 26'	Report	Çalhanoğlu 11' (pen.); Martínez (penalty missed) 27'	Stadium: San Siro; Attendance: 56,608; Referee: Daniele Doveri

20 November 2021 13	Fiorentina	4–3	Milan	Florence
20:45 CET (UTC+1)	Duncan 15'; Saponara 45+1'; Vlahović 60', 85'; Castrovilli (yellow card) 90+5'	Report	Ibrahimović 62', 67'; Hernandez (yellow card) 90+5'; Venuti 90+6' (o.g.)	Stadium: Stadio Artemio Franchi; Attendance: 32,567; Referee: Marco Guida

28 November 2021 14	Milan	1–3	Sassuolo	Milan
15:00 CET (UTC+1)	Romagnoli 21', (red card) 77'; Bennacer (yellow card) 53'; Hernandez (yellow card) 54'; Tonali (yellow card) 71'; Kjær (yellow card) 73'	Report	Scamacca 24'; Lopez (yellow card) 27'; Kjær 33' (o.g.); Raspadori (yellow card) 38'; Berardi 66'	Stadium: San Siro; Attendance: 52,824; Referee: Gianluca Manganiello

1 December 2021 15	Genoa	0–3	Milan	Genoa
20:45 CET (UTC+1)	Masiello (yellow card) 67'; Rovella (yellow card) 73'	Report	Ibrahimović 10'; Gabbia (yellow card) 32'; Messias 45+2', 61'	Stadium: Stadio Luigi Ferraris; Attendance: 14,000; Referee: Juan Luca Sacchi

4 December 2021 16	Milan	2–0	Salernitana	Milan
15:00 CET (UTC+1)	Kessié 5'; Saelemaekers 18'; Bakayoko (yellow card) 24'	Report	Di Tacchio (yellow card) 30'; Đurić (yellow card) 86'	Stadium: San Siro; Attendance: 43,609; Referee: Antonio Giua

11 December 2021 17	Udinese	1–1	Milan	Udine
20:45 CET (UTC+1)	Beto 17'; Pérez (yellow card) 24'; Deulofeu (yellow card) 55'; Zeegelaar (yellow card) 87'; Success (red card) 90+5'	Report	Castillejo (yellow card) 87'; Ibrahimović 90+2'; Florenzi (yellow card) 90+5'	Stadium: Stadio Friuli; Attendance: 16,835; Referee: Francesco Fourneau

19 December 2021 18	Milan	0–1	Napoli	Milan
20:45 CET (UTC+1)		Report	Elmas 5'; Di Lorenzo (yellow card) 33'; Malcuit (yellow card) 67'	Stadium: San Siro; Attendance: 54,647; Referee: Davide Massa

22 December 2021 19	Empoli	2–4	Milan	Empoli
20:45 CET (UTC+1)	Bajrami 18'; Romagnoli (yellow card) 62'; Pinamonti 84' (pen.)	Report	Kessié 12', 42'; Tonali (yellow card) 39'; Florenzi 63'; Hernandez 69'; Bennacer (yellow card) 80'	Stadium: Stadio Carlo Castellani; Attendance: 10,596; Referee: Marco Di Bello

6 January 2022 20	Milan	3–1	Roma	Milan
18:30 CET (UTC+1)	Giroud 8' (pen.); Messias 17'; Hernandez (yellow card) 44'; Krunić (yellow card) 56'; Leão 82'; Ibrahimović (penalty missed) 90+4'	Report	Abraham (yellow card) 7', (goal) 40'; Zaniolo (yellow card) 18'; Karsdorp (yellow card) 44' (yellow-red card) 74'; Cristante (yellow card) 85'; Mancini (yellow card) 85' (yellow-red card) 90+3'	Stadium: San Siro; Attendance: 35,870; Referee: Daniele Chiffi

9 January 2022 21	Venezia	0–3	Milan	Venice
12:30 CET (UTC+1)	Ceccaroni (yellow card) 56'; Svoboda (red card) 58'	Report	Ibrahimović 2'; Saelemaekers (yellow card) 5'; Gabbia (yellow card) 37'; Hernandez 48', 59' (pen.); Tonali (yellow card) 73'	Stadium: Stadio Pierluigi Penzo; Attendance: 5,582; Referee: Massimiliano Irrati

17 January 2022 22	Milan	1–2	Spezia	Milan
18:30 CET (UTC+1)	Kalulu (yellow card) 22'; Hernandez (penalty missed) 45'; Leão 45+1'; Gabbia (yellow card) 62'	Report	Gyasi (yellow card) 19', (goal) 90+6'; Kiwior (yellow card) 32'; Provedel (yellow card) 45'; Agudelo 64'; Maggiore (yellow card) 65'; Nikolaou (yellow card) 90+3'	Stadium: San Siro; Attendance: 5,000; Referee: Marco Serra

23 January 2022 23	Milan	0–0	Juventus	Milan
20:45 CET (UTC+1)	Leão (yellow card) 12'; Messias (yellow card) 42'	Report	Locatelli (yellow card) 9'; Kean (yellow card) 89'	Stadium: San Siro; Attendance: 5,000; Referee: Marco Di Bello

5 February 2022 24	Internazionale	1–2	Milan	Milan
18:00 CET (UTC+1)	Perišić 38'; Çalhanoğlu (yellow card) 60'; Škriniar (yellow card) 84'	Report	Romagnoli (yellow card) 21'; Brahim (yellow card) 72'; Giroud 75', 78'; Bennacer (yellow card) 76'; Krunić (yellow card) 90+2'; Hernandez (red card) 90+6'	Stadium: San Siro; Attendance: 37,918; Referee: Marco Guida

13 February 2022 25	Milan	1–0	Sampdoria	Milan
12:30 CET (UTC+1)	Leão 8'; Brahim (yellow card) 19'; Romagnoli (yellow card) 26'; Bennacer (yellow card) 60'	Report	Rincón (yellow card) 10'	Stadium: San Siro; Attendance: 35,710; Referee: Daniele Chiffi

19 February 2022 26	Salernitana	2–2	Milan	Salerno
20:45 CET (UTC+1)	Bonazzoli 29'; Éderson (yellow card) 52'; Đurić 72', (yellow card) 72'	Report	Messias 5'; Bennacer (yellow card) 35'; Giroud (yellow card) 60'; Rebić (yellow card) 70', (goal) 77'; Romagnoli (yellow card) 83'	Stadium: Stadio Arechi; Attendance: 18,449; Referee: Michael Fabbri

25 February 2022 27	Milan	1–1	Udinese	Milan
18:45 CET (UTC+1)	Leão 29', (yellow card) 90+5'; Rebić (yellow card) 68'	Report	Pérez (yellow card) 17'; Becão (yellow card) 49'; Udogie 66'; Molina (yellow card) 73'; Success (yellow card) 77'	Stadium: San Siro; Attendance: 44,588; Referee: Matteo Marchetti

6 March 2022 28	Napoli	0–1	Milan	Naples
20:45 CET (UTC+1)	Koulibaly (yellow card) 24'; Rrahmani (yellow card) 37'; Osimhen (yellow card) 77'; Ounas (yellow card) 90+2'	Report	Giroud (yellow card) 39', (goal) 49'; Hernandez (yellow card) 77'; Maignan (yellow card) 83'; Florenzi (yellow card) 90+3'	Stadium: Stadio Diego Armando Maradona; Attendance: 42,000; Referee: Daniele Orsato

12 March 2022 29	Milan	1–0	Empoli	Milan
20:45 CET (UTC+1)	Kalulu 19'; Tonali (yellow card) 90+4'	Report		Stadium: San Siro; Attendance: 48,801; Referee: Daniele Chiffi

19 March 2022 30	Cagliari	0–1	Milan	Cagliari
20:45 CET (UTC+1)	Bellanova (yellow card) 77'	Report	Bennacer 59'	Stadium: Unipol Domus; Attendance: 12,309; Referee: Marco Di Bello

4 April 2022 31	Milan	0–0	Bologna	Milan
20:45 CEST (UTC+2)		Report	Dijks (yellow card) 41'; Orsolini (yellow card) 90+8'	Stadium: San Siro; Attendance: 68,136; Referee: Livio Marinelli

10 April 2022 32	Torino	0–0	Milan	Turin
20:45 CEST (UTC+2)	Lukić (yellow card) 14'; Pobega (yellow card) 31'	Report	Tomori (yellow card) 18'; Kalulu (yellow card) 36'	Stadium: Stadio Olimpico Grande Torino; Attendance: 23,472; Referee: Daniele Doveri

15 April 2022 33	Milan	2–0	Genoa	Milan
21:00 CEST (UTC+2)	Leão 11'; Tonali (yellow card) 84'; Messias 87'	Report	Yeboah (yellow card) 79'; Guðmundsson (yellow card) 90+4'	Stadium: San Siro; Attendance: 70,259; Referee: Daniele Chiffi

24 April 2022 34	Lazio	1–2	Milan	Rome
20:45 CEST (UTC+2)	Immobile 4'; Strakosha (yellow card) 8'; Lucas (yellow card) 53'; Cataldi (yellow card) 74'	Report	Tomori (yellow card) 26'; Giroud 50'; Kalulu (yellow card) 83'; Ibrahimović (yellow card) 85'; Tonali 90+3', (yellow card) 90+4'	Stadium: Stadio Olimpico; Attendance: 26,500; Referee: Marco Guida

1 May 2022 35	Milan	1–0	Fiorentina	Milan
15:00 CEST (UTC+2)	Leão 82'; Bennacer (yellow card) 88'	Report	Maleh (yellow card) 2'; Venuti (yellow card) 42'; Martínez Quarta (yellow card) 72'	Stadium: San Siro; Attendance: 71,542; Referee: Paolo Valeri

8 May 2022 36	Hellas Verona	1–3	Milan	Verona
20:45 CEST (UTC+2)	Faraoni 38', (yellow card) 45+1'; Ilić (yellow card) 70'	Report	Leão (yellow card) 45+1'; Tonali 45+3', 50'; Florenzi 87'	Stadium: Stadio Marcantonio Bentegodi; Attendance: 30,154; Referee: Daniele Doveri

15 May 2022 37	Milan	2–0	Atalanta	Milan
18:00 CEST (UTC+2)	Giroud (yellow card) 44'; Leão 56'; Kessié (yellow card) 67'; Hernandez 75'; Bennacer (yellow card) 90+2'	Report	Koopmeiners (yellow card) 53'; Malinovskyi (yellow card) 87'	Stadium: San Siro; Attendance: 73,304; Referee: Daniele Orsato

22 May 2022 38	Sassuolo	0–3	Milan	Reggio Emilia
18:00 CEST (UTC+2)	Lopez (yellow card) 37'; Kyriakopoulos (yellow card) 53'	Report	Giroud 17', 32'; Tonali (yellow card) 34'; Kessié 36'	Stadium: Mapei Stadium; Attendance: 21,525; Referee: Daniele Doveri

=== Coppa Italia ===
13 January 2022 Round of 16	Milan	3–1 (a.e.t.)	Genoa	Milan
21:00 CET (UTC+1)	Tonali (yellow card) 42'; Giroud 74'; Leão 102'; Saelemaekers 112', (yellow card) 115'	Report	Østigård 17', (yellow card) 53'; Badelj (yellow card) 37'; Yeboah (yellow card) 47'; Hefti (yellow card) 64'	Stadium: San Siro; Attendance: 13,325; Referee: Gianluca Aureliano

9 February 2022 Quarter-finals	Milan	4–0	Lazio	Milan
21:00 CET (UTC+1)	Tonali (yellow card) 22'; Leão 24'; Giroud 41', 45+1'; Kessié 79'	Report	Luiz Felipe (yellow card) 15'	Stadium: San Siro; Attendance: 26,947; Referee: Simone Sozza

1 March 2022 Semi-finals; First leg	Milan	0–0	Internazionale	Milan
21:00 CET (UTC+1)		Report	Brozović (yellow card) 33'; Martínez (yellow card) 58'	Stadium: San Siro; Attendance: 53,881; Referee: Maurizio Mariani

19 April 2022 Semi-finals; Second leg	Internazionale	3–0 (3–0 agg.)	Milan	Milan
21:00 CEST (UTC+2)	Martínez 4', 40'; Škriniar (yellow card) 51'; Gosens 82'	Report	Hernandez (yellow card) 35'; Tomori (yellow card) 90'	Stadium: San Siro; Attendance: 74,508; Referee: Maurizio Mariani

=== UEFA Champions League ===
==== Group stage ====
The draw for the group stage was held on 26 August 2021.

Pos	Team	Pld	W	D	L	GF	GA	GD	Pts	Qualification	LIV	ATM	POR	MIL
1	(England) Liverpool	6	6	0	0	17	6	+11	18	Advance to knockout phase	—	2–0	2–0	3–2
2	(Spain) Atlético Madrid	6	2	1	3	7	8	−1	7	Advance to knockout phase	2–3	—	0–0	0–1
3	(Portugal) Porto	6	1	2	3	4	11	−7	5	Transfer to Europa League	1–5	1–3	—	1–0
4	(Italy) Milan	6	1	1	4	6	9	−3	4		1–2	1–2	1–1	—

Source: UEFA
Rules for classification: Group stage tiebreakers

15 September 2021 1	Liverpool (England)	3–2	(Italy) Milan	Liverpool, England
21:00 CEST (UTC+2)	Tomori 9' (o.g.); Salah (penalty missed) 14', 49'; Henderson 69'; Milner (yellow card) 90+3'	Report	Bennacer (yellow card) 13'; Rebić 42'; Brahim 44', (yellow card) 61'	Stadium: Anfield; Attendance: 51,445; Referee: Szymon Marciniak (Poland)

28 September 2021 2	Milan (Italy)	1–2	(Spain) Atlético Madrid	Milan, Italy
21:00 CEST (UTC+2)	Kessié (yellow card) 15' (yellow-red card) 29'; Leão 20'; Rebić (yellow card) 29'; Hernandez (yellow card) 69'; Saelemaekers (yellow card) 79'	Report	Kondogbia (yellow card) 60'; Griezmann 84'; Suárez 90+7' (pen.)	Stadium: San Siro; Attendance: 35,374; Referee: Cüneyt Çakır (Turkey)

19 October 2021 3	Porto (Portugal)	1–0	(Italy) Milan	Porto, Portugal
21:00 CEST (UTC+2)	Oliveira (yellow card) 3'; Uribe (yellow card) 38'; Díaz 65'	Report	Tomori (yellow card) 16'; Giroud (yellow card) 20'; Kalulu (yellow card) 81'; Ibrahimović (yellow card) 87'; Leão (yellow card) 90'	Stadium: Estádio do Dragão; Attendance: 32,130; Referee: Felix Brych (Germany)

3 November 2021 4	Milan (Italy)	1–1	(Portugal) Porto	Milan, Italy
18:45 CET (UTC+1)	Tomori (yellow card) 55'; Mbemba 61' (o.g.)	Report	Díaz 6'; Grujić (yellow card) 49'; Mbemba (yellow card) 65'; Vitinha (yellow card) 73'; Conceição (yellow card) 90+2'	Stadium: San Siro; Attendance: 39,675; Referee: Clément Turpin (France)

24 November 2021 5	Atlético Madrid (Spain)	0–1	(Italy) Milan	Madrid, Spain
21:00 CET (UTC+1)	Llorente (yellow card) 60'	Report	Giroud (yellow card) 27'; Bakayoko (yellow card) 67'; Messias 87'; Hernandez (yellow card) 90+4'	Stadium: Wanda Metropolitano; Attendance: 61,019; Referee: Slavko Vinčić (Slovenia)

7 December 2021 6	Milan (Italy)	1–2	(England) Liverpool	Milan, Italy
21:00 CET (UTC+1)	Tomori 29'	Report	Salah 36'; Origi 55'	Stadium: San Siro; Attendance: 56,237; Referee: Danny Makkelie (Netherlands)

== Statistics ==
=== Appearances and goals ===
As of 23 May 2022

No.	Pos	Nat	Player	Total		Serie A		Coppa Italia		Champions League	
No.	Pos	Nat	Player	Apps	Goals	Apps	Goals	Apps	Goals	Apps	Goals
Goalkeepers
1	GK	(Romania) ROU	Ciprian Tătărușanu	9	0	6	0	0	0	3	0
16	GK	(France) FRA	Mike Maignan	39	0	32	0	4	0	3	0
83	GK	(Italy) ITA	Antonio Mirante	0	0	0	0	0	0	0	0
Defenders
2	DF	(Italy) ITA	Davide Calabria	33	2	24+2	2	2+1	0	4	0
5	DF	(Senegal) SEN	Fodé Ballo-Touré	12	0	5+5	0	0	0	2	0
13	DF	(Italy) ITA	Alessio Romagnoli	26	1	16+3	1	2	0	4+1	0
19	DF	(France) FRA	Théo Hernandez	41	5	30+2	5	4	0	5	0
20	DF	(France) FRA	Pierre Kalulu	37	1	21+7	1	3+1	0	2+3	0
23	DF	(England) ENG	Fikayo Tomori	40	1	30+1	0	3+1	0	5	1
24	DF	(Denmark) DEN	Simon Kjær	14	0	10+1	0	0	0	3	0
25	DF	(Italy) ITA	Alessandro Florenzi	30	2	12+12	2	1+1	0	0+4	0
46	DF	(Italy) ITA	Matteo Gabbia	10	0	6+2	0	1+1	0	0	0
91	DF	(Italy) ITA	Luca Stanga	1	0	0+1	0	0	0	0	0
Midfielders
4	MF	(Algeria) ALG	Ismaël Bennacer	40	2	15+16	2	2+1	0	4+2	0
7	MF	(Spain) ESP	Samu Castillejo	5	0	1+4	0	0	0	0	0
8	MF	(Italy) ITA	Sandro Tonali	45	5	31+5	5	3	0	5+1	0
10	MF	(Spain) ESP	Brahim Díaz	40	4	25+6	3	1+3	0	5	1
27	MF	(Italy) ITA	Daniel Maldini	13	1	2+6	1	1+1	0	0+3	0
33	MF	(Bosnia and Herzegovina) BIH	Rade Krunić	35	0	15+13	0	2+1	0	3+1	0
41	MF	(France) FRA	Tiémoué Bakayoko	18	0	5+9	0	0+1	0	0+3	0
56	MF	(Belgium) BEL	Alexis Saelemaekers	46	2	22+14	1	2+2	1	5+1	0
79	MF	(Ivory Coast) CIV	Franck Kessié	39	7	25+6	6	3	1	4+1	0
Forwards
9	FW	(France) FRA	Olivier Giroud	38	14	22+7	11	4	3	3+2	0
11	FW	(Sweden) SWE	Zlatan Ibrahimović	27	8	11+12	8	0	0	1+3	0
12	FW	(Croatia) CRO	Ante Rebić	29	3	6+18	2	1+2	0	2	1
17	FW	(Portugal) POR	Rafael Leão	42	14	31+3	11	3+1	2	4	1
22	FW	(Serbia) SRB	Marko Lazetić	1	0	0	0	0+1	0	0	0
30	FW	(Brazil) BRA	Junior Messias	32	6	14+12	5	2+2	0	1+1	1
93	FW	(Sweden) SWE	Emil Roback	1	0	0	0	0+1	0	0	0
Players transferred out during the season
14	DF	(Italy) ITA	Andrea Conti	1	0	0+1	0	0	0	0	0
26	MF	(Italy) ITA	Tommaso Pobega	0	0	0	0	0	0	0	0
64	FW	(Italy) ITA	Pietro Pellegri	6	0	1+5	0	0	0	0	0
77	GK	(Italy) ITA	Alessandro Plizzari	0	0	0	0	0	0	0	0

Source: Competitions

=== Goalscorers ===
As of 23 May 2022

Rank	No.	Pos	Nat	Name	Serie A	Coppa Italia	Champions League	Total
1	17	FW	(Portugal)	Rafael Leão	11	2	1	14
1	9	FW	(France)	Olivier Giroud	11	3	0	14
3	11	FW	(Sweden)	Zlatan Ibrahimović	8	0	0	8
4	79	MF	(Ivory Coast)	Franck Kessié	6	1	0	7
5	30	FW	(Brazil)	Junior Messias	5	0	1	6
6	8	MF	(Italy)	Sandro Tonali	5	0	0	5
6	19	DF	(France)	Théo Hernandez	5	0	0	5
8	10	MF	(Spain)	Brahim Díaz	3	0	1	4
9	12	FW	(Croatia)	Ante Rebić	2	0	1	3
10	2	DF	(Italy)	Davide Calabria	2	0	0	2
10	4	MF	(Algeria)	Ismael Bennacer	2	0	0	2
10	56	MF	(Belgium)	Alexis Saelemaekers	1	1	0	2
10	25	DF	(Italy)	Alessandro Florenzi	2	0	0	2
14	13	DF	(Italy)	Alessio Romagnoli	1	0	0	1
14	20	DF	(France)	Pierre Kalulu	1	0	0	1
14	23	DF	(England)	Fikayo Tomori	0	0	1	1
14	27	MF	(Italy)	Daniel Maldini	1	0	0	1
Own goals					3	0	1	4
Totals					69	7	6	82

=== Assists ===
As of 23 May 2022

Rank	No.	Pos	Nat	Name	Serie A	Coppa Italia	Champions League	Total
1	17	FW	(Portugal)	Rafael Leão	9	1	1	11
2	19	DF	(France)	Théo Hernandez	6	3	0	9
3	10	MF	(Spain)	Brahim Díaz	2	1	1	4
4	11	FW	(Sweden)	Zlatan Ibrahimovic	3	0	0	3
4	2	DF	(Italy)	Davide Calabria	3	0	0	3
4	9	FW	(France)	Olivier Giroud	3	0	0	3
7	12	FW	(Croatia)	Ante Rebić	2	0	0	2
7	56	MF	(Belgium)	Alexis Saelemaekers	2	0	0	2
7	8	MF	(Italy)	Sandro Tonali	2	0	0	2
7	33	MF	(Bosnia and Herzegovina)	Rade Krunić	2	0	0	2
7	30	FW	(Brazil)	Junior Messias	2	0	0	2
12	20	DF	(France)	Pierre Kalulu	2	0	0	1
12	4	MF	(Algeria)	Ismael Bennacer	1	0	0	1
12	79	MF	(Ivory Coast)	Franck Kessie	0	0	1	1
12	16	GK	(France)	Mike Maignan	1	0	0	1
12	13	DF	(Italy)	Alessio Romagnoli	0	1	0	1
Totals					37	6	3	44

=== Clean sheets ===
As of 23 May 2022

Rank	No.	Pos	Nat	Name	Serie A	Coppa Italia	Champions League	Total
1	16	GK	(France)	Mike Maignan	17	2	0	19
2	1	GK	(Romania)	Ciprian Tătărușanu	1	0	1	2
Totals					17	2	1	20

=== Disciplinary record ===
No.	Pos	Nat	Name	Serie A			Coppa Italia			Champions League			Total		
No.	Pos	Nat	Name	Yellow card	(yellow card) (yellow-red card)	Red card	Yellow card	(yellow card) (yellow-red card)	Red card	Yellow card	(yellow card) (yellow-red card)	Red card	Yellow card	(yellow card) (yellow-red card)	Red card
8	MF	(Italy)	Sandro Tonali	9			2						11		
19	DF	(France)	Théo Hernandez	5	1	1	1			2			8	1	2
4	MF	(Algeria)	Ismaël Bennacer	7						1			8		
23	DF	(England)	Fikayo Tomori	4			1			2			7		
9	FW	(France)	Olivier Giroud	5						1			6		
10	MF	(Spain)	Brahim Díaz	4						1			5		
17	FW	(Portugal)	Rafael Leao	4						1			5		
20	DF	(France)	Pierre Kalulu	4						1			5		
13	DF	(Italy)	Alessio Romagnoli	4		1							4		1
41	MF	(France)	Tiémoué Bakayoko	3						1			4		
56	MF	(Belgium)	Alexis Saelemaekers	2			1			1			4		
79	MF	(Ivory Coast)	Franck Kessie	2							1		2	1	
46	DF	(Italy)	Matteo Gabbia	3									3		
11	FW	(Sweden)	Zlatan Ibrahimovic	2						1			3		
12	FW	(Croatia)	Ante Rebić	2						1			3		
2	DF	(Italy)	Davide Calabria	2									2		
5	DF	(Senegal)	Fodé Ballo-Touré	2									2		
24	DF	(Denmark)	Simon Kjær	2									2		
30	FW	(Brazil)	Junior Messias	2									2		
25	DF	(Italy)	Alessandro Florenzi	2									2		
33	MF	(Bosnia and Herzegovina)	Rade Krunić	2									2		
16	GK	(France)	Mike Maignan	1						1			2		
27	MF	(Italy)	Daniel Maldini	1									1		
Totals				74	1	2	5	0	0	14	1	0	93	2	2
