= Pierre Kalulu =

French association football player (born 2000)

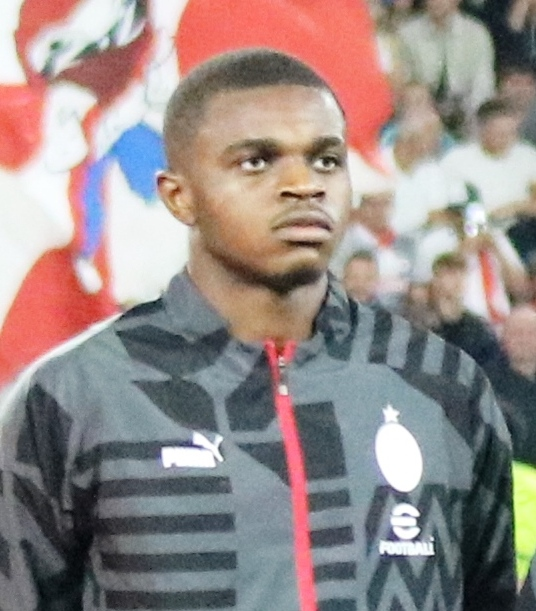
- Kalulu with AC Milan in 2022

Personal information
- Full name: Pierre Kazeye Rommel Kalulu Kyatengwa
- Date of birth: 5 June 2000 (age 26)
- Place of birth: Lyon, France
- Height: 1.82 m (6 ft 0 in)
- Positions: Right-back; centre-back

Team information
- Current team: Juventus
- Number: 15

Youth career
- 2007–2010: Saint-Priest
- 2010–2018: Lyon

Senior career*
Years	Team	Apps	(Gls)
2018–2020	Lyon B	34	(0)
2020–2025	AC Milan	84	(3)
2024–2025	→ Juventus (loan)	29	(1)
2025–	Juventus	48	(2)

International career^{‡}
2018	France U18	5	(0)
2018–2019	France U19	12	(0)
2019	France U20	3	(0)
2021–2023	France U21	19	(2)
2021	France Olympic	4	(0)
2025–	France	5	(0)
Medal record
Men's football
Representing France
UEFA Nations League
Third place	2025 Germany
- * Club domestic league appearances and goals as of 23:13, 8 November 2026 (UTC) ‡ National team caps and goals as of 2 October 2026

Pierre Kazeye Rommel Kalulu Kyatengwa (pronounced [ka.lu.lu]; born 5 June 2000) is a French professional footballer who plays as a defender for Serie A club Juventus and the France national team. Having played for most of his youth career as a right-back, he began to play in central defense as his career progressed to the senior level.

== Early life ==
Kalulu was born in the 8th arrondissement of Lyon, France, and is Congolese by descent. His father was born in Kabimba, Belgian Congo, and his mother in Likasi, Congo-Léopoldville. He acquired French nationality on 26 December 2000 through the collective effect of his parents' naturalization.

== Club career ==
=== Lyon ===
Kalulu moved from his youth club Saint-Priest to the youth academy of Olympique Lyon in the summer of 2010. In Lyon, he passed through the different youth departments from 2010 to 2018, and was elevated to their reserve team in June 2018. Ahead of the home game against Amiens played on 5 March 2020, Kalulu received his first ever call-up to the senior team. However, he remained on the bench for the entire game.

=== AC Milan ===
In the summer of 2020, Kalulu moved to Italy to join AC Milan, and signed a contract until 2025. On 10 December, he made his professional debut, playing the entire Europa League game against Sparta Prague as a left-sided centre-back; as Milan won 1–0, he was praised for helping the team keep a clean sheet. Three days later, on 13 December, Kalulu made his debut in Serie A, replacing the injured Matteo Gabbia in the fifth minute of a home game against Parma. In the following away league game against Genoa played on 16 December, he made his first-ever start in Serie A and scored a debut goal in his senior career, equalizing the score in the eventual 2–2 draw.

During the 2021–22 season, after an injury to Alessio Romagnoli, Kalulu started the match against Napoli on 6 March 2022, partnering in central defence with Fikayo Tomori; he helped Milan to clinch a 1–0 win, impressing against Napoli's striker Victor Osimhen. On 12 March against Empoli, Kalulu scored his first goal of the season, a powerful curling shot from outside the box, as Milan managed to win 1–0 and stay top of the league. With him and Tomori again in central defence, Milan kept clean sheets in two consecutive Serie A games for the first time in 2022.

In the 2022–23 season, Kalulu played in several different positions all throughout the season such as a right-sided centre-back next to Fikayo Tomori, on the right of a back-three with Malick Thiaw in the middle and Tomori on the left, and as a right full-back in a back-four. However, towards the season's end, as manager Stefano Pioli switched back to 4–2–3–1 formation, Kalulu began to lose his place in the starting XI as a centre-back to Thiaw, the summer signing who emerged in the second half of the season, and team captain Davide Calabria as a right full-back.

The 2023–24 season further undermined Kalulu's career at Milan, with him limited to just 11 appearances in all competitions, mainly due to several injuries requiring months of rehabilitation. However, he managed to return to fitness by May 2024 and made three appearances during that month.

=== Juventus ===
On 21 August 2024, fellow Serie A side Juventus announced the signing of Kalulu on a one-year loan, worth €3.3 million, with an option to buy at the end of the loan for a further €14 million. The move was made official on 6 June 2025. Three weeks later, on 26 June, he scored an own goal in a 2–5 loss to Manchester City in the last match of the group stage of the 2025 FIFA Club World Cup, becoming the first-ever player from a European club to score an own goal in a FIFA club competition.

== International career ==
Since June 2018, Kalulu has played through the various national junior teams of France, taking part in the 2019 UEFA European Under-19 Championship. Kalulu made his senior France debut on 5 June 2025 against Spain in the UEFA Nations League, at MHPArena in Stuttgart.

== Personal life ==
Kalulu is the younger brother of footballers Aldo Kalulu and Gédéon Kalulu. He is the older brother of Joseph Kalulu.

== Career statistics ==
=== Club ===
As of match played 8 November 2026

Appearances and goals by club, season and competition
Club	Season	League			National cup (Note: Includes Coppa Italia)		Europe		Other		Total	
Club	Season	Division	Apps	Goals	Apps	Goals	Apps	Goals	Apps	Goals	Apps	Goals
Lyon B	2018–19	National 2	17	0	—		—		—		17	0
Lyon B	2019–20	National 2	19	0	—		—		—		19	0
Lyon B	Total		36	0	—		—		—		36	0
AC Milan	2020–21	Serie A	13	1	1	0	4 (Note: Appearances in UEFA Europa League)	0	—		18	1
AC Milan	2021–22	Serie A	28	1	4	0	5 (Note: Appearances in UEFA Champions League)	0	—		37	1
AC Milan	2022–23	Serie A	34	1	1	0	10	0	1 (Note: Appearance in Supercoppa Italiana)	0	46	1
AC Milan	2023–24	Serie A	9	0	0	0	2 (Note: One appearance in UEFA Champions League, one appearance in UEFA Europa League)	0	—		11	0
AC Milan	Total		84	3	6	0	21	0	1	0	112	3
Juventus (loan)	2024–25	Serie A	29	1	1	0	8	0	5 (Note: One appearance in Supercoppa Italiana, four appearances in FIFA Club World Cup)	0	43	1
Juventus	2025–26	Serie A	37	2	2	0	10	0	—		49	2
Juventus	2026–27	Serie A	11	0	0	0	4	0	—		15	0
Juventus	Juventus total		77	3	3	0	22	0	5	0	107	3
Career total			197	6	9	0	43	0	6	0	255	6

=== International ===
As of match played 2 October 2026

Appearances and goals by national team and year
National team	Year	Apps	Goals
France	2025	1	0
France	2026	4	0
Total		5	0

== Honours ==
AC Milan

- Serie A: 2021–22

France

- UEFA Nations League third place: 2024–25
