= Andreas Jungdal =

Danish footballer (born 2002)

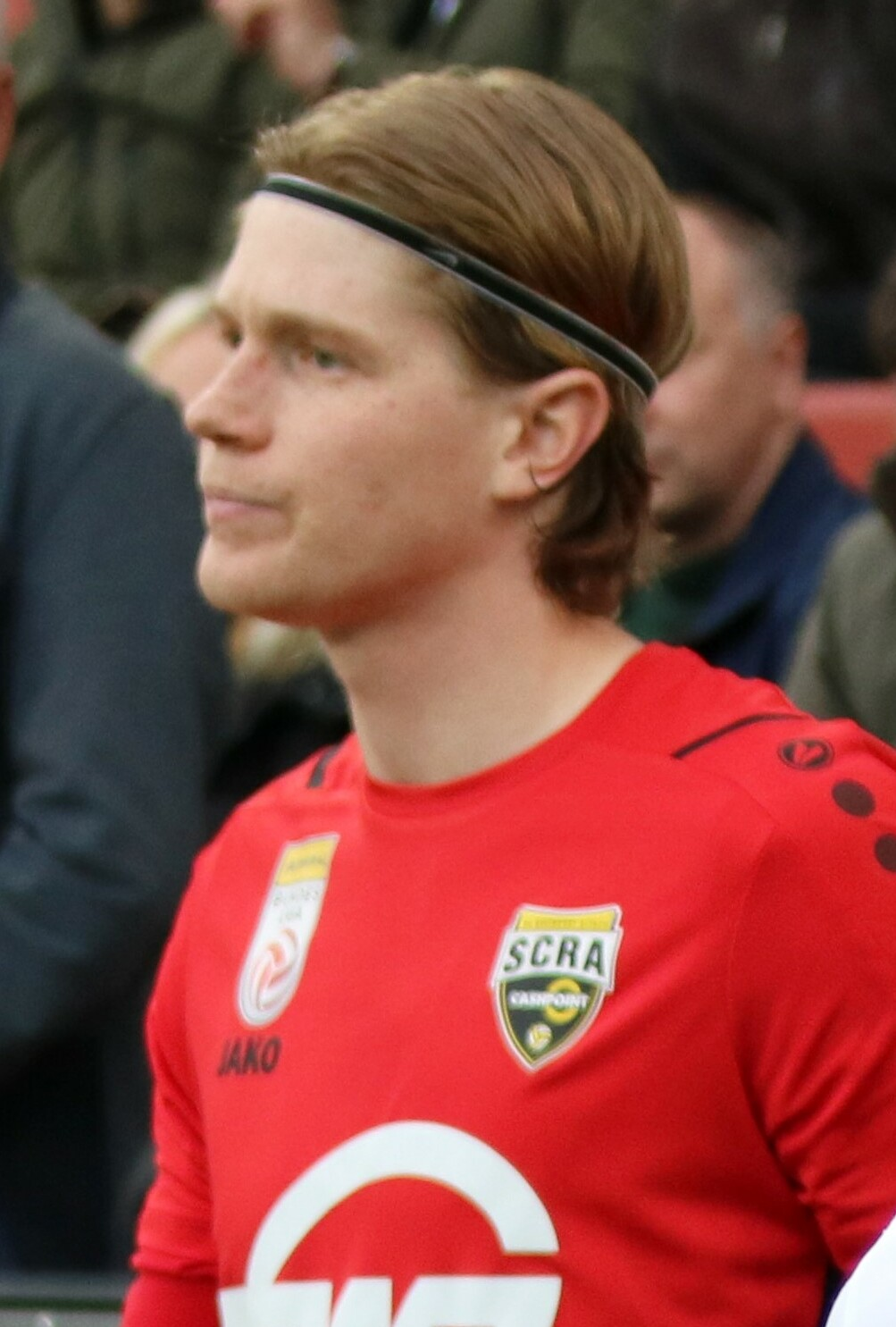
- Jungdal with Rheindorf Altach in 2023

Personal information
- Full name: Andreas Kristoffer Jungdal
- Date of birth: 22 February 2002 (age 24)
- Place of birth: Singapore
- Height: 1.95 m (6 ft 5 in)
- Position: Goalkeeper

Team information
- Current team: Westerlo
- Number: 99

Youth career
- 2007–2013: Skibet IF
- 2013–2019: Vejle
- 2019–2022: AC Milan

Senior career*
Years	Team	Apps	(Gls)
2021–2023	AC Milan	0	(0)
2023	→ Rheindorf Altach (loan)	6	(0)
2023–2025	Cremonese	18	(0)
2025	→ Westerlo (loan)	17	(0)
2025–	Westerlo	40	(0)

International career^{‡}
2018–2019	Denmark U17	5	(0)
2019	Denmark U18	3	(0)
2021–2022	Denmark U20	2	(0)
2023–2025	Denmark U21	14	(0)
- * Club domestic league appearances and goals as of 1 June 2026 ‡ National team caps and goals as of 22 June 2025

Andreas Kristoffer Jungdal (born 22 February 2002) is a Danish professional footballer who plays as a goalkeeper for Belgian Pro League club Westerlo.

== Club career ==
Jungdal was born in Singapore, where his father was stationed for The Lego Group. His family returned to Denmark, and he started playing football as a five-year-old for Skibet IF in Vejle, before joining the town's main club Vejle Boldklub in 2013.

On 16 July 2019, Jungdal joined the youth academy of Italian Serie A club AC Milan. He was part of the first team for the first time on 26 October 2020 as an unused substitute in a 3–3 home draw against Roma in Serie A. On 18 October 2021, he extended his contract with Milan until 2024. In late 2021, he was sidelined with a disease in his kidneys, but made a full recovery in early 2022.

On 10 January 2023, he joined Austrian Bundesliga club Rheindorf Altach on a six-month loan until the end of the season, with an option to be signed permanently.

On 10 August 2023, Jungdal signed with recently relegated Serie B club Cremonese, on a free transfer. He made his debut for the club on 31 October, in a 2–1 win against Cittadella in Coppa Italia.

On 16 January 2025, Jungdal moved on loan to Westerlo in Belgium, with an option to buy. On 18 June 2025, the deal was made permanent, signing a three-year contract.

== International career ==
Jungdal is eligible to represent the Singapore national football team as he was born in Singapore and also eligible to represent Denmark due to both of his parents being from the same country. In 2018, he was called up to the Denmark U-17 team. In May 2025, Jungdal was selected for the European Championship with the Danish U21 national team.

Jungdal was one of the players who were called-up with the Denmark national team by head coach Brian Riemer for the UEFA Nations League matches against Norway, Wales (home and away) and Portugal on 24, 27 September and 1, 4 October 2026.

== Style of play ==
Jungdal has been described as an "explosive" goalkeeper with good ability to play out from the back. The media has compared his playing style to that of Mike Maignan.

== Career statistics ==
=== Club ===
As of match played 22 March 2026

Appearances and goals by club, season and competition
Club	Season	League			Cup		Europe		Other		Total	
Club	Season	Division	Apps	Goals	Apps	Goals	Apps	Goals	Apps	Goals	Apps	Goals
AC Milan	2020–21	Serie A	0	0	0	0	0	0	—		0	0
AC Milan	2021–22	Serie A	0	0	0	0	0	0	—		0	0
AC Milan	2022–23	Serie A	0	0	—		0	0	—		0	0
AC Milan	Total		0	0	0	0	0	0	—		0	0
Rheindorf Altach (loan)	2022–23	Austrian Bundesliga	6	0	—		—		—		6	0
Cremonese	2023–24	Serie B	18	0	2	0	—		0	0	20	0
Cremonese	2024–25	Serie B	0	0	0	0	—		—		0	0
Cremonese	Total		18	0	2	0	—		0	0	20	0
Westerlo (loan)	2024–25	Belgian Pro League	17	0	—		—		—		17	0
Westerlo	2025–26	Belgian Pro League	30	0	0	0	—		—		30	0
Westerlo	Westerlo total		47	0	0	0	—		—		47	0
Career total			71	0	2	0	0	0	0	0	73	0

== Honours ==
AC Milan

- Serie A: 2021–22
