= Alexis Saelemaekers =

Belgian footballer (born 1999)

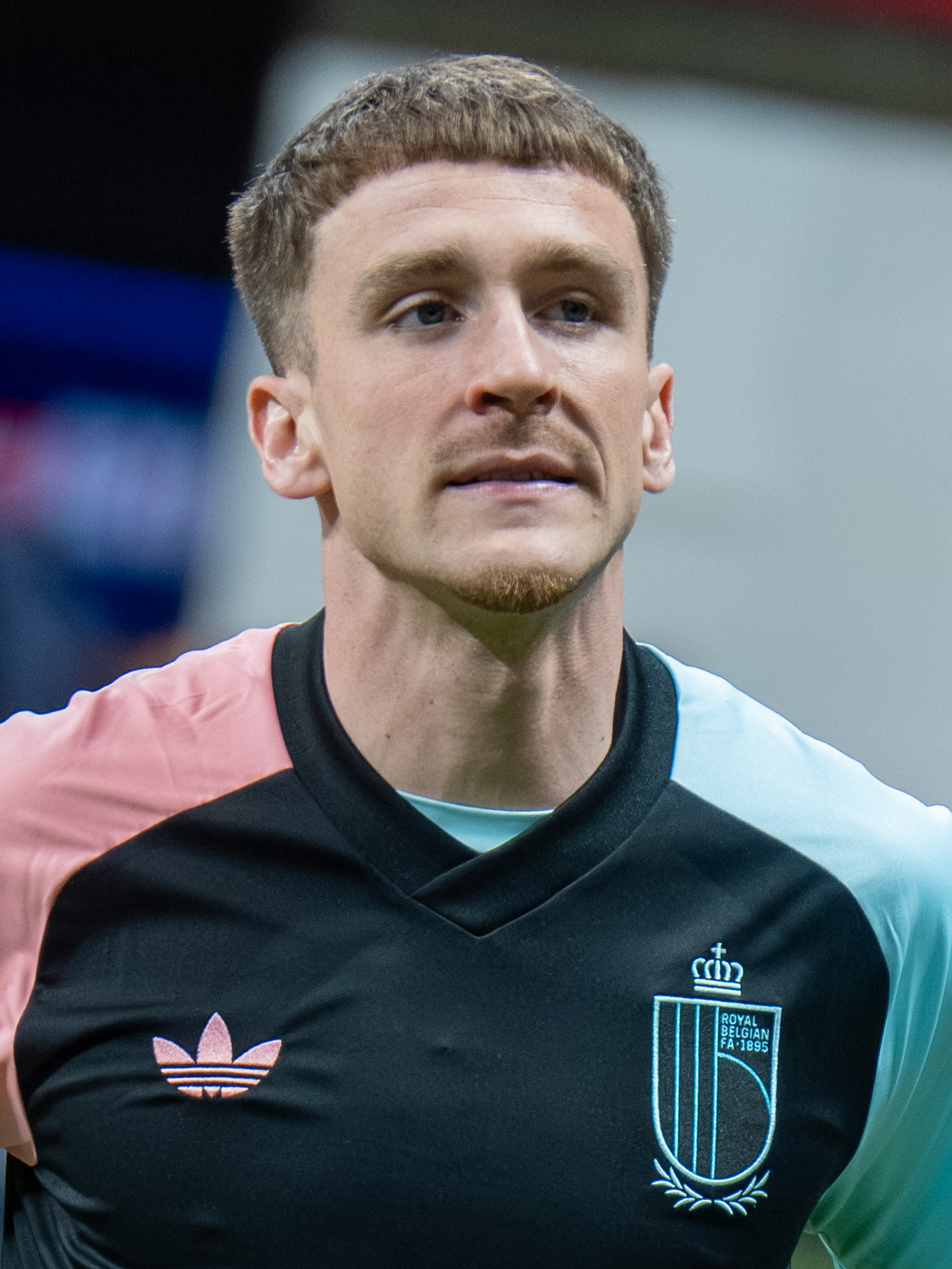
- Saelemaekers with Belgium in 2026

Personal information
- Full name: Alexis Jesse M. Saelemaekers
- Date of birth: 27 June 1999 (age 27)
- Place of birth: Berchem-Sainte-Agathe, Belgium
- Height: 1.80 m (5 ft 11 in)
- Positions: Winger; wing-back

Team information
- Current team: AC Milan
- Number: 56

Youth career
- 2010–2012: V. Beersel-Drogenbos
- 2012–2018: Anderlecht

Senior career*
Years	Team	Apps	(Gls)
2018–2020	Anderlecht	57	(2)
2020	→ AC Milan (loan)	13	(1)
2020–	AC Milan	138	(8)
2023–2024	→ Bologna (loan)	30	(4)
2024–2025	→ Roma (loan)	22	(7)

International career^{‡}
2015	Belgium U16	1	(0)
2017–2018	Belgium U19	4	(0)
2018–2020	Belgium U21	12	(0)
2020–	Belgium	28	(3)
- * Club domestic league appearances and goals as of 21:49, 20 September 2026 (UTC) ‡ National team caps and goals as of 21:21, 10 July 2026 (UTC)

Alexis Jesse M. Saelemaekers (French: [alɛksi salmakɛʁs], Dutch: [aˈlɛksis ˈsaləmakərs]; born 27 June 1999) is a Belgian professional footballer who plays as a winger or wing-back for Serie A club AC Milan and the Belgium national team.

== Club career ==
=== Anderlecht ===
In October 2017, Saelemaekers signed a contract at Anderlecht until 2019. On 16 February 2018, he made his official debut against Sint-Truiden. He came on as a substitute in the 77th minute. On 8 June 2018, Saelemaekers renewed his contract until 2022.

=== AC Milan ===
On 31 January 2020, AC Milan signed Saelemaekers on loan, with an option to buy. Milan reportedly agreed a €3.5 million fee plus €1 million in bonuses in case of a permanent signing. The same year on 2 February, he made his league debut as a substitute to Davide Calabria in a 1–1 draw against Verona on 2 February 2020.

On 1 July 2020, Saelemaekers signed a contract with Milan which would keep him at the club until 30 June 2024. On 18 July, he scored his first goal for the club in a 5–1 home win over Bologna in Serie A.

In October 2020, Saelemaekers scored his first goal of the season against Rio Ave in qualification match for Europa league. His next goal came on 26 October against Roma in 3–3 draw, his third and last goal of the season was on 20 December against Sassuolo as Milan pulled an away 2–1 victory. In total, he scored three goals and five assists of the season.

On 15 October 2021, Saelemaekers extended his contract until 30 June 2026 with a raise in salary. On 4 December, he scored his first goal of this season against Salernitana, a powerful left footed shot in eventual 2–0 win. His next goal came in a Coppa Italia match against Genoa on 13 January 2022, a goal in extra time as Milan won 3–1.

==== Loan to Bologna ====
On 30 August 2023, Saelemaekers joined Bologna on loan with an option to buy. At Bologna, Saelemaekers quickly established himself as an important player, fitting perfectly into the manager Thiago Motta's so-called 2–7–2 system. Due to the presence of Riccardo Orsolini on the right side as an "inverted" left-footed right winger, right-footed Saelemaekers began to play on the left in the similar role, a position he sometimes played in at Milan in absence of regular starter Rafael Leão. Saelemaekers was about to join Bologna on a full transfer from Milan before Vincenzo Italiano took over the departing Thiago Motta as a manager at the end of the season and declined to spend €10 million on the player, focusing on other transfer targets.

While initially on the summer transfer market due to oversaturation of attacking players on both wings, Saelemaekers returned to AC Milan's training camp in July, played in all the pre-season friendlies, and was even a surprise starter for the opening 2024–25 Serie A game versus Torino, playing as a left back in place of Theo Hernandez, who later came on in the second half for Davide Calabria, with Saelemaekers moving onto the right side of a back-four.

==== Loan to Roma ====
On 30 August 2024, he joined fellow Serie A club Roma, on loan for the 2024–25 season. He scored a career high 7 goals in all competitions before returning to Milan at the end of the season.

== International career ==
Saelemaekers playing for Belgium at the 2026 FIFA World Cup

Saelemaekers debuted with the Belgium national team in a 1–1 friendly draw with Ivory Coast on 8 October 2020. On 5 September 2021, he scored his first international goal in a 2022 FIFA World Cup qualification against the Czech Republic in Brussels, which ended in a 3–0 win.

On 15 May 2026, he was selected in the 26-man squad for the 2026 FIFA World Cup. The following month, on 26 June, he netted a goal in a 5–1 victory over New Zealand in the team's final group match, which saw them progress to the knock-out stages of the tournament.

== Career statistics ==
=== Club ===
As of match played 20 September 2026

Appearances and goals by club, season and competition
Club	Season	League			National cup (Note: Includes Belgian Cup, Coppa Italia)		Europe		Other		Total	
Club	Season	Division	Apps	Goals	Apps	Goals	Apps	Goals	Apps	Goals	Apps	Goals
Anderlecht	2017–18	Belgian Pro League	11	0	0	0	0	0	—		11	0
Anderlecht	2018–19	Belgian Pro League	30	0	1	0	3 (Note: Appearances in UEFA Europa League)	0	—		34	0
Anderlecht	2019–20	Belgian Pro League	16	2	3	0	—		—		19	2
Anderlecht	Total		57	2	4	0	3	0	—		64	2
AC Milan (loan)	2019–20	Serie A	13	1	2	0	—		—		15	1
AC Milan	2020–21	Serie A	32	2	1	0	7	1	—		40	3
AC Milan	2021–22	Serie A	36	1	4	1	6 (Note: Appearances in UEFA Champions League)	0	—		46	2
AC Milan	2022–23	Serie A	30	2	1	0	8	2	0	0	39	4
AC Milan	2024–25	Serie A	1	0	—		—		—		1	0
AC Milan	2025–26	Serie A	35	3	3	0	—		1 (Note: Appearance in Supercoppa Italiana)	0	39	3
AC Milan	2026–27	Serie A	4	0	0	0	1	0	—		5	0
AC Milan	Milan total		151	9	11	1	22	3	1	0	185	13
Bologna (loan)	2023–24	Serie A	30	4	2	0	—		—		32	4
Roma (loan)	2024–25	Serie A	22	7	2	0	7	0	—		31	7
Career total			260	22	19	1	32	3	1	0	312	26

=== International ===
As of match played 10 July 2026

Appearances and goals by national team and year
National team	Year	Apps	Goals
Belgium	2020	1	0
Belgium	2021	6	1
Belgium	2022	2	0
Belgium	2023	3	0
Belgium	2024	0	0
Belgium	2025	9	1
Belgium	2026	7	1
Total		28	3

Scores and results list Belgium's goal tally first. Score column indicates score after each Saelemaekers goal.

List of international goals scored by Alexis Saelemaekers
No.	Date	Venue	Cap	Opponent	Score	Result	Competition
1.	5 September 2021	King Baudouin Stadium, Brussels, Belgium	3	Czech Republic	3–0	3–0	2022 FIFA World Cup qualification
2.	18 November 2025	Stade Maurice Dufrasne, Liège, Belgium	21	Liechtenstein	5–0	7–0	2026 FIFA World Cup qualification
3.	26 June 2026	BC Place, Vancouver, Canada	26	New Zealand	5–1	5–1	2026 FIFA World Cup

== Honours ==
AC Milan

- Serie A: 2021–22

Individual

- Serie A Goal of the Month: April 2023
