= Matteo Gabbia =

Italian footballer (born 1999)

Personal information
- Full name: Matteo Gabbia
- Date of birth: 21 October 1999 (age 27)
- Place of birth: Fagnano Olona, Italy
- Height: 1.90 m (6 ft 3 in)
- Position: Centre-back

Team information
- Current team: AC Milan
- Number: 46

Youth career
- 2012–2017: AC Milan

Senior career*
| Years | Team | Apps | (Gls) |
| 2017– | AC Milan | 114 | (4) |
| 2018–2019 | → Lucchese (loan) | 29 | (1) |
| 2023–2024 | → Villarreal (loan) | 7 | (0) |

International career^{‡}
| 2014 | Italy U15 | 3 | (0) |
| 2014–2015 | Italy U16 | 13 | (3) |
| 2015–2016 | Italy U17 | 17 | (2) |
| 2016–2017 | Italy U18 | 4 | (4) |
| 2016–2018 | Italy U19 | 21 | (3) |
| 2018–2019 | Italy U20 | 14 | (0) |
| 2019–2021 | Italy U21 | 7 | (0) |
Medal record
Men's football
Representing Italy
UEFA European Under-19 Championship
| Runner-up | 2018 Finland |
- * Club domestic league appearances and goals as of 14:53, 12 October 2026 (UTC) ‡ National team caps and goals as of 12:22, 31 March 2021 (UTC)

Matteo Gabbia (Italian pronunciation: [matˈtɛ.o ˈɡabbja]; born 21 October 1999) is an Italian professional footballer who plays as a centre-back for Serie A club AC Milan.

== Club career ==
=== AC Milan ===
Gabbia joined AC Milan's youth academy in 2012 aged 12. He received his first ever call-up to the senior team by head coach Vincenzo Montella ahead of the home Serie A game against Roma, which was played on 7 May 2017. However, he remained an unused substitute. He made his first competitive appearance for the club on 24 August 2017, in a Europa League qualifier against Shkëndija, coming on for Manuel Locatelli in the second half.

==== Loan to Lucchese ====
On 31 August 2018, Gabbia was loaned to Serie C club Lucchese on a season-long loan deal. On 16 September he made his Serie C debut in a 1–0 home defeat against Arezzo, where he played the entire match. Eleven days later, on 27 September, he scored his first professional goal for Lucchese in the 47th minute of a 2–2 home draw against Carrarese. Gabbia ended his season-long loan to Lucchese with 30 appearances, all as a starter, he was replaced only 2 times, and he scored 1 goal.

==== Return to AC Milan ====
Gabbia stayed with Milan for the 2019–20 season as a squad player behind the likes of Alessio Romagnoli, Mateo Musacchio, and Simon Kjær. On 15 January 2020, he played in the 3–0 victory against SPAL in the Coppa Italia, coming on as a substitute for Simon Kjær in the 82nd minute. He made his league debut on 17 February 2020 in a 1–0 home victory against Torino, again as a substitute for Kjær in the 44th minute. On 25 October 2022, Gabbia scored his first Champions League goal in a 4–0 away victory over Dinamo Zagreb.

Gabbia scored his first Serie A goal for Milan on 3 February 2024 in an away game against Frosinone.

==== Loan to Villarreal and second return ====
On 26 July 2023, Gabbia joined Spanish La Liga club Villarreal on loan until 30 June 2024.

On 3 January 2024, amid the injury crisis that severely affected AC Milan's central defense, the club recalled Gabbia from his loan. He finished the season with 25 more appearances, 3 goals, and positive reception from the press and fans alike, prompting the club's management to remove him from the outgoing transfer list and start negotiations to upgrade his contract.

On 22 September 2024 he scored a last minute goal in a 2–1 win against Inter Milan on the Derby della Madonnina

== International career ==
Gabbia represented Italy at the 2016 UEFA European Under-17 Championship, where the team did not advance from the group stage.

He played in two group-stage games for Italy U19 at the 2018 UEFA European Under-19 Championship, where Italy was the runner-up. Then with the Italy U20, Gabbia took part in the 2019 FIFA U-20 World Cup.

He made his debut with the Italy U21 on 6 September 2019, in a friendly match won 4–0 against Moldova.

Gabbia received his first call-up with the Italy national team for the 2024–25 UEFA Nations League matches against Belgium and Israel on 10 and 14 October 2024, respectively.

== Style of play ==
Gabbia has been described as a versatile player. Having started his youth career as a defensive and a central midfielder, he later switched to deeper roles, such as a centre-back, in either a three or a four-man defensive line. Besides his ball-winning skills, Gabbia also retains playmaking attributes, such as passing the ball over long distances, and occasionally joins the attacking play. He is comfortable in aerial duels and adept at heading the ball.

== Career statistics ==
=== Club ===
As of match played 11 October 2026

Appearances and goals by club, season and competition
| Club | Season | League | | | National cup (Note: Includes Coppa Italia) | | Europe | | Other | | Total | |
| Club | Season | Division | Apps | Goals | Apps | Goals | Apps | Goals | Apps | Goals | Apps | Goals |
|---|---|---|---|---|---|---|---|---|---|---|---|---|
| Milan | 2017–18 | Serie A | 0 | 0 | 0 | 0 | 1 (Note: Appearance(s) in UEFA Europa League) | 0 | — | | 1 | 0 |
| Milan | 2019–20 | Serie A | 9 | 0 | 1 | 0 | — | | — | | 10 | 0 |
| Milan | 2020–21 | Serie A | 8 | 0 | 0 | 0 | 5 | 0 | — | | 13 | 0 |
| Milan | 2021–22 | Serie A | 8 | 0 | 2 | 0 | 0 | 0 | — | | 10 | 0 |
| Milan | 2022–23 | Serie A | 12 | 0 | 1 | 0 | 4 (Note: Appearances in UEFA Champions League) | 1 | 0 | 0 | 17 | 1 |
| Milan | 2023–24 | Serie A | 18 | 2 | 1 | 0 | 6 | 1 | — | | 25 | 3 |
| Milan | 2024–25 | Serie A | 26 | 2 | 3 | 0 | 6 | 0 | 1 (Note: Appearance in Supercoppa Italiana) | 0 | 36 | 2 |
| Milan | 2025–26 | Serie A | 30 | 0 | 1 | 0 | — | | 0 | 0 | 31 | 0 |
| Milan | 2026–27 | Serie A | 3 | 0 | 0 | 0 | 0 | 0 | — | | 3 | 0 |
| Milan | Total | | 114 | 4 | 9 | 0 | 22 | 2 | 1 | 0 | 146 | 6 |
| Lucchese (loan) | 2018–19 | Serie C | 29 | 1 | 0 | 0 | — | | 1 (Note: Appearance in Serie C play-offs) | 0 | 30 | 1 |
| Villarreal (loan) | 2023–24 | La Liga | 7 | 0 | 0 | 0 | 6 | 0 | — | | 13 | 0 |
| Career total | | | 150 | 5 | 9 | 0 | 28 | 2 | 2 | 0 | 189 | 7 |

== Honours ==
AC Milan

- Serie A: 2021–22
- Supercoppa Italiana: 2024–25

Italy U19

- UEFA European Under-19 Championship runner-up: 2018
