= Matteo Soncin =

Italian footballer (born 2001)

Personal information
- Date of birth: 28 March 2001 (age 25)
- Place of birth: Adria, Italy
- Height: 1.90 m (6 ft 3 in)
- Position: Goalkeeper

Youth career
- AC Milan

Senior career*
Years	Team	Apps	(Gls)
2017–2020	AC Milan	0	(0)
2020–2024	Pergolettese	93	(0)
2024	Taranto	0	(0)

International career^{‡}
2016	Italy U15	1	(0)
2016	Italy U16	2	(0)
2018–2019	Italy U18	5	(0)
- * Club domestic league appearances and goals as of 3 May 2024 ‡ National team caps and goals as of 17 April 2019

Matteo Soncin (born 28 March 2001) is an Italian professional footballer who plays as a goalkeeper.

== Club career ==
Born in Adria, Soncin started his career on AC Milan youth system. After five years in the club, on 15 August 2020 he left AC Milan and joined Serie C club Pergolettese.

Soncin made his Pergolettese and Professional debut on 7 April 2021 against Renate.
