= Luca Stanga =

Italian footballer (born 2002)

Personal information
- Date of birth: 23 January 2002 (age 24)
- Place of birth: Brescia, Italy
- Height: 1.85 m (6 ft 1 in)
- Position: Defender

Team information
- Current team: Derthona

Youth career
- 2008–2022: AC Milan

Senior career*
Years	Team	Apps	(Gls)
2021–2022	AC Milan	1	(0)
2022–2025	Lecco	17	(0)
2023–2024	→ Rimini (loan)	6	(0)
2024	→ Juve Stabia (loan)	1	(0)
2025–2026	Celle Varazze	30	(0)
2026–	Derthona	4	(0)
- * Club domestic league appearances and goals as of 22 September 2026

Luca Stanga (born 23 January 2002) is an Italian professional footballer who plays as a defender for Serie D club Derthona.

== Club career ==
Born in Brescia, Stanga is a youth product of AC Milan, where he started playing football at the age of six, before coming through all their youth ranks and finally beginning training with the senior team in 2021. He made his professional debut with the club on 9 January 2022, coming in as a substitute in the final minutes of a 3–0 Serie A win over Venezia.

On 1 August 2022, Stanga joined Serie C club Lecco on a permanent deal, signing a contract until 30 June 2024.

On 28 August 2023, Stanga joined Rimini on a season-long loan. On 1 February 2024, Stanga moved on loan to Juve Stabia.

== International career ==
Although he has never represented Italy in an official international match, Stanga took part in a training camp with the Under-19 team in January 2021.
