= Gabriele Galardi =

Italian footballer

Personal information
- Date of birth: 5 February 2002 (age 24)
- Place of birth: Rome, Italy
- Position: Defender

Team information
- Current team: Brienza

Youth career
- –2019: Vigor Perconti
- 2019–2020: AC Milan

Senior career*
Years	Team	Apps	(Gls)
2020–2022	AC Milan	0	(0)
2020–2021	→ Viterbese (loan)	6	(0)
2021	→ Lucchese (loan)	2	(0)
2021	→ Nuova Florida (loan)	6	(0)
2022	→ Gravina (loan)	7	(0)
2022–2023	Gravina	20	(0)
2023–	Brienza	0	(0)
- * Club domestic league appearances and goals as of 31 July 2024

Gabriele Galardi (born 5 February 2002) is an Italian professional footballer who plays as a left-back for Italian club Brienza.

== Career ==
On 28 July 2020, he joined on loan to Serie D club Nuova Florida.

At the middle of season, on 27 January 2022, he moved to Gravina on loan.

== Career statistics ==
=== Club ===
As of 17 June 2021.

Appearances and goals by club, season and competition
Club	Season	League			Cup		Other		Total	
Club	Season	Division	Apps	Goals	Apps	Goals	Apps	Goals	Apps	Goals
AC Milan	2020–21	Serie A	0	0	0	0	0	0	0	0
Viterbese (loan)	2020–21	Serie C	6	0	0	0	0	0	6	0
Lucchese (loan)	2020–21	Serie C	1	0	0	0	0	0	1	0
Nuova Florida (loan)	2021–22	Serie D	0	0	0	0	0	0	0	0
Career total			7	0	0	0	0	0	7	0
