= Alessandro Sala (footballer) =

Italian footballer (born 2001)

Personal information
- Date of birth: 7 May 2001 (age 25)
- Place of birth: Sesto San Giovanni, Italy
- Height: 1.85 m (6 ft 1 in)
- Position: Midfielder

Youth career
- –2020: AC Milan

Senior career*
| Years | Team | Apps | (Gls) |
| 2020–2022 | AC Milan | 0 | (0) |
| 2020–2021 | → Cesena (loan) | 9 | (0) |
| 2021 | → Pro Sesto (loan) | 7 | (0) |
| 2021–2022 | → Renate (loan) | 7 | (0) |
| 2022–2025 | Pro Sesto | 87 | (9) |
| 2025 | Pro Patria | 0 | (0) |

International career^{‡}
| 2018–2019 | Italy U18 | 7 | (2) |
- * Club domestic league appearances and goals as of 31 August 2025 ‡ National team caps and goals as of 18:04, 17 June 2021 (UTC)

Alessandro Sala (born 7 May 2001) is an Italian professional footballer who plays as a midfielder.

== Club career ==
On 16 July 2021, he joined Renate on loan.

On 22 January 2022, he returned to Pro Sesto on a permanent basis.

== Career statistics ==
=== Club ===
As of 23 December 2021.

Appearances and goals by club, season and competition
| Club | Season | League | | | Cup | | Other | | Total | |
| Club | Season | Division | Apps | Goals | Apps | Goals | Apps | Goals | Apps | Goals |
|---|---|---|---|---|---|---|---|---|---|---|
| AC Milan | 2020–21 | Serie A | 0 | 0 | 0 | 0 | 0 | 0 | 0 | 0 |
| Cesena (loan) | 2020–21 | Serie C | 9 | 0 | 0 | 0 | 0 | 0 | 9 | 0 |
| Pro Sesto (loan) | 2020–21 | Serie C | 7 | 0 | 0 | 0 | 0 | 0 | 7 | 0 |
| Renate (loan) | 2021–22 | Serie C | 7 | 0 | 1 | 0 | 0 | 0 | 8 | 0 |
| Career total | | | 23 | 0 | 1 | 0 | 0 | 0 | 24 | 0 |
