= Emir Murati =

Italian-born Croatian footballer (born 2000)

Personal information
- Date of birth: 7 March 2000 (age 26)
- Place of birth: Calcinate, Italy
- Height: 1.83 m (6 ft 0 in)
- Position: Midfielder

Team information
- Current team: FC Balzers

Youth career
- –2019: AC Milan
- 2018–2019: → Torino (loan)

Senior career*
Years	Team	Apps	(Gls)
2019–2022	AC Milan	0	(0)
2019–2020	→ Rende (loan)	23	(0)
2020–2021	→ Pro Sesto (loan)	0	(0)
2021	→ Vibonese (loan)	3	(0)
2023–	FC Balzers	16	(2)
- * Club domestic league appearances and goals as of 31 July 2024

Emir Murati (born 7 March 2000) is an Italian-Croatian professional footballer who plays as a midfielder for Liechtnsteiner club FC Balzers.

== Club career ==
=== Milan ===
He is a product of AC Milan academy and started playing for their under-19 squad in the 2017–18 season.

==== Loan to Rende ====
On 29 August 2019 he joined Serie C club Rende on a season-long loan.

He made his professional Serie C debut for Rende on 29 September 2019 in a game against Potenza. He substituted Markus Soomets in the 57th minute.

==== Loan to Vibonese ====
On 30 January 2021, he was loaned to Vibonese.
