= Luan Capanni =

Brazilian footballer

Personal information
- Full name: Luan David Capanni Dias
- Date of birth: 20 May 2000 (age 26)
- Place of birth: São Paulo, Brazil
- Height: 1.90 m (6 ft 3 in)
- Positions: Attacking midfielder; forward

Team information
- Current team: São João de Ver
- Number: 11

Youth career
- 2010–2015: Corinthians
- 2015–2018: Flamengo
- 2018–2019: Lazio
- 2019–2020: AC Milan

Senior career*
Years	Team	Apps	(Gls)
2018–2019	Lazio	1	(0)
2019–2022	AC Milan	0	(0)
2021	→ Racing Santander (loan)	9	(0)
2021–2022	→ Viterbese (loan)	19	(1)
2022	→ Grosseto (loan)	12	(2)
2022	→ Estrela da Amadora (loan)	4	(0)
2022–2024	Arka Gdynia	21	(2)
2024–2025	Latina	17	(3)
2025	Siracusa	10	(1)
2025–2026	Nova Iguaçu	4	(0)
2026–	São João de Ver	1	(0)
- * Club domestic league appearances and goals as of 13 September 2026

Luan David Capanni Dias (born 29 May 2000) is a Brazilian professional footballer who plays as an attacking midfielder and forward for Portuguese Liga 3 club São João de Ver.

== Club career ==
=== Lazio ===
Capanni is a youth product of Corinthians and Flamengo, and signed for Lazio in 2018 on a one-year contract. Capanni made his professional debut with Lazio in a 3-1 Serie A loss to Torino on 26 May 2019, replacing Ștefan Radu in the 83rd minute.

=== AC Milan ===
On 20 August 2019, Capanni signed for AC Milan on a free transfer.

On 30 January 2020, Milan loaned him to Spanish Segunda División B club Racing Santander

On 29 July 2021, he joined Viterbese on loan until 30 June 2022. On 23 January 2022, he moved on another loan to Grosseto.

On 20 July 2022, Capanni joined Estrela da Amadora in Portugal.

=== Arka Gdynia ===
On 16 December 2022, he left AC Milan permanently to join Polish I liga club Arka Gdynia, signing a deal until June 2025.

=== Serie C years ===
In 2024, Capanni returned to Italy, joining Serie C club Latina.

In August 2025, Capanni signed for newly-promoted Serie C club Siracusa. On 20 November 2025, Capanni rescinded his contract with Siracusa by mutual consent.

== Personal life ==
Capanni was born in Brazil and is of Italian descent, holding dual nationality, and expressed an interest in representing the Italy national football team.
