= Davide Calabria =

Italian footballer (born 1996)

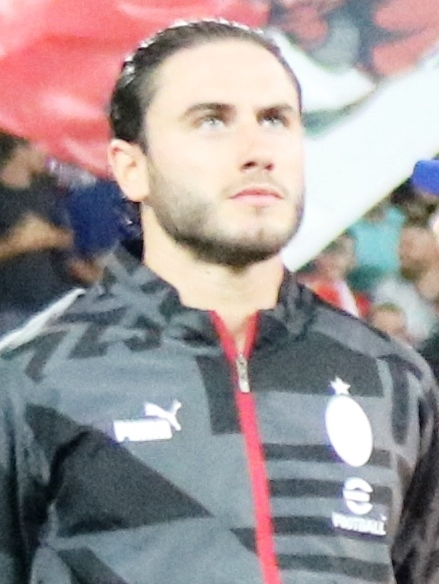
- Calabria lining up for AC Milan in 2022

Personal information
- Full name: Davide Calabria
- Date of birth: 6 December 1996 (age 29)
- Place of birth: Brescia, Italy
- Height: 1.77 m (5 ft 10 in)
- Position: Right-back

Team information
- Current team: Panathinaikos
- Number: 2

Youth career
- 2007–2015: AC Milan

Senior career*
Years	Team	Apps	(Gls)
2014–2025	AC Milan	210	(9)
2025	→ Bologna (loan)	11	(0)
2025–	Panathinaikos	35	(5)

International career^{‡}
2013	Italy U17	9	(0)
2013	Italy U18	1	(0)
2014–2015	Italy U19	12	(1)
2015	Italy U20	2	(0)
2015–2019	Italy U21	19	(0)
2020–2022	Italy	7	(0)
Medal record
Men's football
Representing Italy
UEFA Nations League
Third place	2021 Italy
UEFA European Under-17 Championship
Runner-up	2013 Slovakia
- * Club domestic league appearances and goals as of 8 November 2026 ‡ National team caps and goals as of 21:31, 14 June 2022 (UTC)

Davide Calabria (Italian pronunciation: [ˈdaːvide kaˈlaːbrja]; born 6 December 1996) is an Italian professional footballer who plays as a right-back for Super League Greece club Panathinaikos.

== Club career ==
=== AC Milan ===
Calabria received his first call-up to AC Milan's senior team ahead of the away game against Lazio played on 25 January 2015, but remained an unused substitute. The same year on 30 May, he made his Serie A debut in a 3–1 away victory against Atalanta.

With the departure of Alessio Romagnoli at the start of the 2022–23 Serie A, Calabria was promoted to captain of the team. Calabria played in the 2022 Supercoppa Italiana, which ended in a 3–0 defeat against rivals Inter Milan in Riyadh. On 29 January, during a 5–2 home loss against Sassuolo, he reached 200 appearances for the Rossoneri in all competitions.

At the start of the 2024–25 season Calabria lost his place to new signing Emerson Royal, came under intense criticism for his performances, encountered difficulties with head coach Paulo Fonseca, who was eventually sacked on 29 December 2024, and with new head coach Sérgio Conceição whom he was nearly involved in a physical encounter with after Calabria kicked a bottle that struck Conceição. On 11 January 2025, Calabria was stripped of AC Milan's captaincy, being replaced by Mike Maignan.

==== Loan to Bologna ====
On 1 February 2025, Calabria left AC Milan and joined Bologna on loan until the end of the season on 30 June 2025, after 18 years, winning one Scudetto and two Supercoppa Italiana.

=== Panathinaikos ===
On 18 August 2025, Calabria moved to Greece, and signed a three-year contract with Super League Greece club Panathinaikos as a free agent.

== International career ==
Calabria represented Italy at various youth levels. On 9 November 2020, Calabria received his first call-up to the senior Italy national team from manager Roberto Mancini for three friendly matches against Estonia, Poland, and Bosnia and Herzegovina. He made his debut against Estonia, coming on as a substitute in a 4–0 friendly victory.

== Career statistics ==
=== Club ===
As of match played 8 November 2026

Appearances and goals by club, season and competition
Club	Season	League			National cup (Note: Includes Coppa Italia, Greek Cup)		Europe		Other		Total	
Club	Season	Division	Apps	Goals	Apps	Goals	Apps	Goals	Apps	Goals	Apps	Goals
AC Milan	2014–15	Serie A	1	0	0	0	—		—		1	0
AC Milan	2015–16	Serie A	6	0	2	0	—		—		8	0
AC Milan	2016–17	Serie A	12	0	1	0	—		—		13	0
AC Milan	2017–18	Serie A	21	1	4	0	5 (Note: Appearances in UEFA Europa League)	0	—		30	1
AC Milan	2018–19	Serie A	26	1	2	0	4	0	1 (Note: Appearance in Supercoppa Italiana)	0	33	1
AC Milan	2019–20	Serie A	25	1	2	0	—		—		27	1
AC Milan	2020–21	Serie A	32	2	1	0	6	0	—		39	2
AC Milan	2021–22	Serie A	26	2	3	0	4 (Note: Appearances in UEFA Champions League)	0	—		33	2
AC Milan	2022–23	Serie A	25	1	1	0	6	0	1	0	33	1
AC Milan	2023–24	Serie A	29	1	2	0	10 (Note: Six appearances in UEFA Champions League, four appearances in UEFA Europa League)	0	—		41	1
AC Milan	2024–25	Serie A	7	0	1	1	5	0	1	0	14	1
AC Milan	Total		210	9	19	1	40	0	3	0	272	10
Bologna (loan)	2024–25	Serie A	11	0	2	0	—		—		13	0
Panathinaikos	2025–26	Super League Greece	25	2	3	0	11	1	—		39	3
Panathinaikos	2026–27	Super League Greece	10	3	0	0	3 (Note: UEFA Conference League)	1	—		13	4
Panathinaikos	Total		35	5	3	0	14	2	0	0	52	7
Career total			256	13	24	1	54	2	3	0	337	17

=== International ===
As of match played 14 June 2022

Appearances and goals by national team and year
National team	Year	Apps	Goals
Italy	2020	2	0
Italy	2021	3	0
Italy	2022	2	0
Total		7	0

== Honours ==
AC Milan

- Serie A: 2021–22
- Supercoppa Italiana: 2016, 2024–25

Bologna

- Coppa Italia: 2024–25

Italy U17

- UEFA European Under-17 Championship runner-up: 2013

Italy

- UEFA Nations League third place: 2020–21
