= Buti =

Buti may refer to:

== Places ==
- Buti, Tuscany, Italy
- Buti-ye Bala, Sistan and Baluchestan Province, Iran
- Buti-ye Pain, Sistan and Baluchestan Province, Iran
- Cascine di Buti, province of Pisa, Italy

== Other ==
- Buti (given name)
- Buti (surname)
- buti, also known as tiririt, a type of small dinghy used in the Philippines
