= Kristjan Asllani =

Albanian footballer (born 2002)

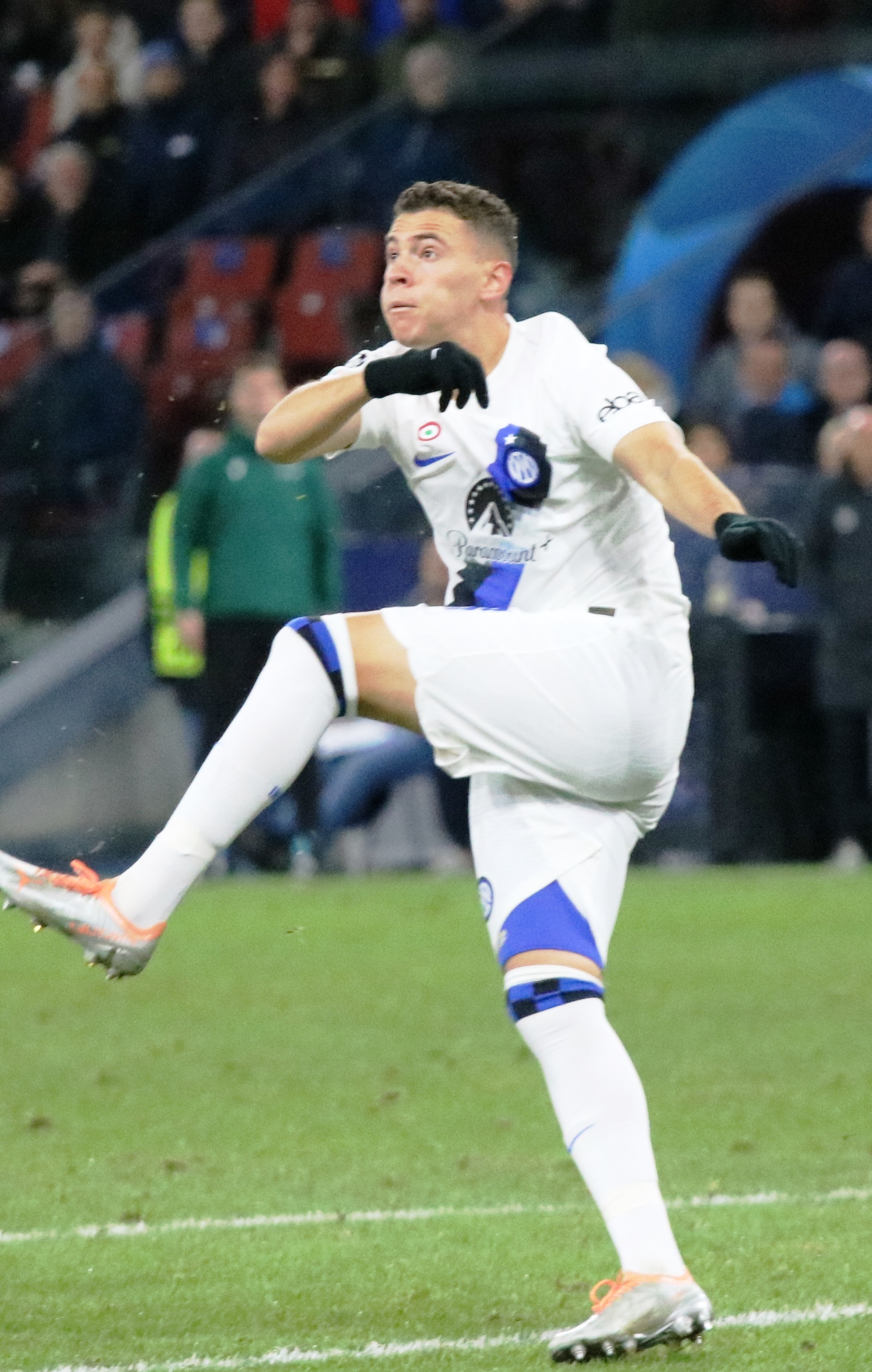
- Asllani with Inter Milan in 2023

Personal information
- Date of birth: 9 March 2002 (age 24)
- Place of birth: Elbasan, Albania
- Height: 1.79 m (5 ft 10 in)
- Position: Defensive midfielder

Team information
- Current team: Al Jazira (on loan from Inter Milan)
- Number: 23

Youth career
- 2007–2012: Butese
- 2008–2009: → Tau Altopascio (loan)
- 2012–2021: Empoli

Senior career*
Years	Team	Apps	(Gls)
2021–2023	Empoli	23	(1)
2022–2023	→ Inter Milan (loan)	20	(0)
2023–	Inter Milan	45	(3)
2025–2026	→ Torino (loan)	15	(0)
2026	→ Beşiktaş (loan)	14	(2)
2026–	→ Al Jazira (loan)	5	(1)

International career^{‡}
2017	Albania U16	2	(0)
2019	Albania U18	2	(0)
2021	Albania U21	5	(0)
2022–	Albania	48	(8)
- * Club domestic league appearances and goals as of 21 November 2026 ‡ National team caps and goals as of 15 November 2026

Kristjan Asllani (Albanian pronunciation: [kɾisˈcjan asˈlani]; born 9 March 2002) is an Albanian professional footballer who plays as a defensive midfielder for UAE Pro League club Al Jazira, on loan from Inter Milan, and the Albania national team.

Born in Elbasan, Albania, and raised in Buti, Italy, Asllani developed through the youth academy of Empoli, making his professional debut with the club in 2021 and later helping Empoli secure their place in Serie A, earning praises for his technical ability and versatility. In 2022 he moved to Inter Milan and was part of the squads that won the 2022 Supercoppa Italiana, 2023–24 Serie A title, and 2023 Supercoppa Italiana. In August 2025, Asllani joined Torino on loan with an option to buy, but the deal was terminated by mutual agreement in January 2026 and he subsequently joined Turkish club Beşiktaş again on loan. In August 2026, he moved on another loan to Al Jazira in the UAE Pro League, with an option to buy that could become an obligation under certain conditions.

Asllani has represented Albania at youth level before making his senior debut in 2022, becoming a consistent figure, contributing to Albania's historic qualification as group winners for UEFA Euro 2024 and participating in the final tournament. Known for his consistency and composure in midfield, Asllani set a national record for consecutive appearances by an outfield player and scored several decisive goals in competitive matches, including winners in the 2024–25 UEFA Nations League B and the 2026 World Cup qualifiers.

== Club career ==
=== Early career ===
Asllani was born in Elbasan, Albania, and moved to Italy with his family at the age of two, settling in the Tuscan town of Buti. He grew up in Buti, developing an early passion for football and spending much of his free time playing with a ball and following matches on television and at stadiums.

He began playing football with local club Butese at around four and a half years old, initially playing as an attacking midfielder. He subsequently joined Tau Altopascio before moving to Empoli, where he continued his development in the club's youth system.

During the 2020–21 Campionato Primavera 1 season, Asllani made 22 league appearances and scored six goals as Empoli finished sixth in the regular-season standings and qualified for the final phase, where he played a key role in the club's title-winning campaign by scoring the equaliser in a 3–2 extra-time victory over Inter Milan in the semi-final before opening the scoring in a 5–3 win over Atalanta in the final.

=== Empoli ===
Asllani made his professional debut for Empoli's senior team on 13 January 2021, appearing in a 2020–21 Coppa Italia match against Napoli.

During pre-season in August 2021, he attracted attention with his performances for the senior squad, including scoring a free kick in a friendly against Montecatini. During the 2021–22 season, he initially played for Empoli's under-19 team, scoring three goals in the UEFA Youth League. He subsequently established himself in the senior team under coach Aurelio Andreazzoli, making his Serie A debut on 22 September in a 2–0 away win against Cagliari.

Following Samuele Ricci's departure in January 2022, Asllani gained a more prominent role in Empoli's midfield, with reports noting that Andreazzoli continued to rely on him. On 19 January, Asllani provided the cross for Nedim Bajrami's goal in Empoli's Coppa Italia round-of-16 match against Inter, which ended in a 3–2 defeat after extra time. He scored his first Serie A goal on 6 May, opening the scoring in a 4–2 away defeat against Inter. Asllani received significant attention from the Italian media, with former footballer and quoting television pundit Lele Adani describing him as the best young player in Serie A and highlighting his growing importance to Empoli after Samuele Ricci's departure for Torino in winter. He made 23 appearances in the Serie A that season as Empoli retained their place in the division. Andreazzoli praised Asllani's technical ability, versatility and attitude, describing him as a player who was "born to play football", highlighting his ability to use both feet and take set pieces while noting that he still needed to develop physically.

=== Inter Milan ===
In May 2022, Italian media reported that Inter were interested in signing Asllani as a potential understudy to Marcelo Brozović in defensive midfield. On 30 June, he joined Inter from Empoli on an initial loan with an obligation to make the transfer permanent.

Asllani made his competitive debut on 20 August, coming on as an 85th-minute substitute in a 3–0 Serie A win over Spezia on matchday 2. He made his UEFA Champions League debut on 13 September, appearing as a late substitute in a 2–0 away win against Viktoria Plzeň in the group stage matchday 2. On 1 October, he made his first start for Inter in a 2–1 Serie A defeat to Roma, deputising for the suspended Brozović in midfield, linking up well with his teammates despite being closely marked by Lorenzo Pellegrini, and coming close to scoring with a long-range effort in the 67th minute. On 12 October, Asllani came on as a late substitute in Inter's 3–3 UEFA Champions League group-stage draw against Barcelona and missed a stoppage-time one-on-one chance against goalkeeper Marc-André ter Stegen that could have secured the victory for Inter. Asllani made his first start in the UEFA Champions League on 1 November, playing the full 90 minutes in a 2–0 away defeat to Bayern Munich in the group stage. On 9 November, he came on as a substitute in a 6–1 league win over Bologna and hit the post with a long-range effort, receiving a match rating of 6/10.

Asllani played a key role in Inter's 2–1 extra-time victory over Parma in the Coppa Italia round of 16 on 10 January 2023, playing the full 120 minutes and initiating the moves that led to both of Inter's goals. On 18 January, Asllani came on as an 84th-minute substitute as Inter defeated Milan 3–0 in the 2022 Supercoppa Italiana at the King Fahd International Stadium in Riyadh, Saudi Arabia, winning the first senior trophy of his career. In the Coppa Italia, Asllani made substitute appearances in the quarter-final against Atalanta and later in the first leg of the semi-final against Juventus in April, as Inter progressed to the final. On 7 April, he started in a 1–1 Serie A draw against Salernitana, initiating Inter's opening goal with a long pass to Romelu Lukaku before the ball reached goalscorer Robin Gosens. Asllani remained an unused substitute as Inter won the Coppa Italia, defeating Fiorentina 2–1. Asllani was named among the substitutes for the UEFA Champions League final on 10 June 2023 but did not enter the match, as Inter lost 1–0 to Manchester City. Asllani finished with 29 appearances in all competitions, 20 came in Serie A, five in the Champions League, three in the Coppa Italia and one in the Supercoppa.

Following Marcelo Brozović's departure in summer 2023, Inter sporting director Piero Ausilio said that the Croatian midfielder had been allowed to leave partly to create more playing opportunities for Asllani, who remained an alternative to Hakan Çalhanoğlu in the deep-lying playmaker role. On 20 September, Asllani started in Inter's 1–1 draw against Real Sociedad in the opening matchday of the 2023–24 UEFA Champions League group stage, covering 6.29 kilometres in the first half, the highest distance recorded by any player during that period. On 29 November, Asllani started and played the full 90 minutes in Inter's 3–3 away draw against Benfica in an UEFA Champions League group stage, as Inter recovered from a three-goal deficit to secure a point.

Asllani came on in the 81st minute of Inter's 3–0 victory over Lazio in the semi-finals of the 2023 Supercoppa Italiana on 19 January 2024; Inter went on to defeat Napoli in the final, winning the competition for the third consecutive time. On 28 January, Asllani made his first start in the Serie A season in a 1–0 away win over Fiorentina, deputising for the suspended Çalhanoğlu and providing the assist for Lautaro Martínez's winning goal from a corner. On 4 March, he scored his first competitive goal for Inter, opening the scoring in a 2–1 win over Genoa. His performances were described as evidence of growing confidence from head coach Simone Inzaghi. Asllani made 23 appearances in Serie A as Inter went on to win their 20th Italian championship. Asllani's season was characterised by steady improvement, as he gradually established a valuable role in the team's Serie A title-winning campaign.

On 23 November 2024, Asllani provided his first assist of the 2024–25 Serie A season with a corner kick for Stefan de Vrij's goal in Inter's 5–0 away win against Hellas Verona, while completing the full 90 minutes match. On 19 December, Asllani scored directly from a corner kick, a rare feat known as a "gol olímpico", in Inter's 2–0 victory over Udinese in the Coppa Italia, helping the club advance to the quarter-finals, with the goal highlighted in reports by several Italian newspapers. On 6 January 2025, Asllani came on as a first-half substitute for the injured Hakan Çalhanoğlu in the 2025 Supercoppa Italia final against Milan, which Inter lost 3–2 after surrendering a two-goal lead. On 3 May, Asllani scored his first Serie A goal of the season, converting a penalty to give Inter a 1–0 victory over Hellas Verona; he was also named man of the match for his performance. Eight days later, he scored another penalty in a 2–0 away win against Torino, scoring in consecutive Serie A matches. On 23 May, Asllani played the full 90 minutes in Inter's 2–0 away win against Como 1907, as the club concluded its Serie A campaign in second place with 81 points, one point behind champions Napoli. On 31 May, Asllani came on in the 70th minute for the injured Çalhanoğlu in the 2025 UEFA Champions League final against PSG, as Inter lost 5–0, a record margin of defeat in a European Cup/UEFA Champions League final.

On 17 June 2025, Asllani made his debut at the FIFA Club World Cup in Inter's opening match of the 2025 tournament, a 1–1 draw against Monterrey, and initiated the move for Inter's equaliser with a floated free kick that was redirected by Carlos Augusto to Lautaro Martínez for the goal. Asllani also appeared in Inter's remaining group-stage matches against Urawa Red Diamonds and River Plate, both of which Inter won, and started the round-of-16 match against Fluminense, playing 53 minutes in the 2–0 defeat that eliminated Inter from the tournament.

==== Loans to Torino and Beşiktaş (2025–26) ====
On 25 August 2025, Asllani joined fellow Serie A club Torino on a season-long loan with an option to make the transfer permanent. The deal reportedly included a €1.5 million loan fee and a purchase option of approximately €7 million. In September, Asllani described leaving Inter as an easy decision, explaining that he needed to play more regularly after limited opportunities at the club.

He made his debut on 31 August 2025 in a goalless draw against Fiorentina, playing 81 minutes. On 14 September, Asllani started in Torino's 1–0 away win against Roma, playing approximately 80 minutes and making a solid performance, while earning a 7.3 rating by Sofascore. On 30 November, Asllani missed a late penalty in Torino's 2–1 defeat away to Lecce, denying his team a chance to equalise; after the match, he publicly apologised to his teammates and supporters, taking responsibility for the miss.

On 30 January 2026, Asllani's loan at Torino was terminated by mutual agreement between Torino and Inter, after he made 16 appearances in all competitions. On the same day, he joined Süper Lig club Beşiktaş on loan for the remainder of the season, with an option to make the transfer permanent. Asllani made his debut for Beşiktaş the following day, coming on as a substitute in the 76th minute against Konyaspor and delivering the cross that led to Orkun Kökçü's winning goal a minute later, before being sent off in the 82nd minute following a foul on an opposing player after a video assistant referee (VAR) review, as Beşiktaş went on to win 2–1. On 22 February 2026, Asllani provided his first assist, setting up a 36th minute goal in a 4–0 home win against Göztepe in the Süper Lig.

On 19 April, Asllani scored his first goal, converting a penalty in stoppage time in a 2–1 away defeat against Samsunspor. On 1 May, Asllani scored another penalty and provided an assist to help Beşiktaş earn a 2–0 away win against Gaziantep. Four days later, Asllani started in Beşiktaş's 1–0 extra-time defeat to Konyaspor in the semi-finals of the Turkish Cup, as Beşiktaş were eliminated from the competition. He finished the loan spell with 17 appearances in all competitions.

==== Loan to Al Jazira ====
On 29 August 2026, Asllani joined UAE Pro League club Al Jazira on a season-long loan, with an option to buy that could become an obligation under certain conditions. Asllani made his on 5 September, coming on as a substitute in the 64th minute and scoring his first goal for the club in the 91st minute of a 3–1 away win against Shabab Al-Ahli. On 14 October, Asllani made his debut in the AFC Champions League Two in Al Jazira's 2–1 home win against Arkadag in the group stage, starting the match before being substituted in the 67th minute.

== International career ==
Asllani was eligible to represent either Italy or Albania, as he holds dual citizenship. He chose to represent Albania in 2017 and progressed through its youth teams, appearing for the under-16, under-18, under-19, before later making four appearances for the under-21 team in the 2023 UEFA European Under-21 Championship qualification, in which Albania recorded two victories.

=== Senior: Establishment, Euro 2024 major tournament ===
Asllani made his debut for the Albanian senior national team on 26 March 2022 under coach Edoardo Reja in a friendly against Spain, coming on as a substitute in the 78th minute of a 2–1 defeat. Three days later, he made his first start for Albania in a friendly against Georgia, playing the full 90 minutes in a 0–0 draw. Asllani made his competitive debut for Albania in the 2022–23 UEFA Nations League B, appearing in three of the team's four matches and starting twice as he gradually established himself as a regular starter in midfield. On 19 November 2022, he scored his first international goal at the age of 20, converting a penalty in a 2–0 friendly win over Armenia, which marked Albania's first victory of the year after a 370-day winless run.

Under new head coach Sylvinho, Asllani became a regular starter during Albania's Euro 2024 qualifying campaign, providing an assist for Nedim Bajrami in a 2–0 win over Moldova on 17 June 2023 before scoring his first goal in European Championship qualifying three days later, in a 3–1 away win against the Faroe Islands. He featured in all eight qualifying matches, starting seven, as Albania finished top of their group for the first time, ahead of the Czech Republic on their head-to-head record, to qualify for the final tournament of the UEFA European Championship for the second time. Asllani was named in Albania's final 26-man squad for UEFA Euro 2024. During the finals, he played in all three of Albania's matches in Group B, featuring in central midfield as the team earned one point from a 2–2 draw against Croatia, finished bottom of the group and were eliminated.

In the 2024–25 UEFA Nations League B campaign, Asllani played every available minute in all 6 matches, scoring the winning goal in a 1–0 away victory over Georgia on 14 October 2024, but Albania however were ultimately relegated to League C. By June 2025, Asllani had made 28 consecutive appearances for Albania, including 21 consecutive full 90-minute appearances, and his run ended when he missed in a friendly in September, but setting a personal record for consecutive appearances by an outfield player. On 9 September 2025, Asllani scored the winning goal from the penalty spot in a 1–0 victory over Latvia in 2026 FIFA World Cup qualification. On 13 November, he scored the only goal in a 1–0 away win against Andorra, securing Albania's place in the UEFA play-offs for the 2026 World Cup with one group match remaining. Asllani concluded again as ever-present in the Group K, scoring twice, as the team recorded four wins without conceding, two draws, and two defeats against England. Asllani played the full play-off match against Poland on 26 March 2026, receiving a booking in the 88th minute, as Albania lost 2–1 after initially taking the lead.

== Career statistics ==
=== Club ===
As of match played 21 November 2026

Appearances and goals by club, season and competition
Club	Season	League			National cup (Note: Includes Coppa Italia, Turkish Cup)		Europe		Other		Total	
Club	Season	Division	Apps	Goals	Apps	Goals	Apps	Goals	Apps	Goals	Apps	Goals
Empoli	2020–21	Serie B	0	0	1	0	—		—		1	0
Empoli	2021–22	Serie A	23	1	3	0	—		—		26	1
Empoli	Total		23	1	4	0	—		—		27	1
Inter Milan (loan)	2022–23	Serie A	20	0	3	0	5 (Note: Appearances in UEFA Champions League)	0	1 (Note: Appearance in Supercoppa Italiana)	0	29	0
Inter Milan	2023–24	Serie A	23	1	1	0	6	0	1	0	31	1
Inter Milan	2024–25	Serie A	22	2	3	1	8	0	6 (Note: Two appearances in Supercoppa Italiana, four appearances in FIFA Club World Cup)	0	39	3
Inter Milan	Inter total		65	3	7	1	19	0	8	0	99	4
Torino (loan)	2025–26	Serie A	15	0	1	0	—		—		16	0
Beşiktaş (loan)	2025–26	Süper Lig	14	2	3	0	—		—		17	2
Al Jazira (loan)	2026–27	UAE Pro League	5	1	2	0	4	0	—		11	1
Career total			122	7	17	1	23	0	8	0	170	8

=== International ===
As of match played 15 November 2026

Appearances and goals by national team and year
National team	Year	Apps	Goals
Albania	2022	7	1
Albania	2023	9	1
Albania	2024	13	1
Albania	2025	9	2
Albania	2026	10	3
Total		48	8

Scores and results list Albania goal tally first, score column indicates score after each Asllani goal.

List of international goals scored by Kristjan Asllani
No.	Date	Venue	Cap	Opponent	Score	Result	Competition
1	19 November 2022	Arena Kombëtare, Tirana, Albania	7	Armenia	2–0	2–0	Friendly
2	20 June 2023	Tórsvøllur, Tórshavn, Faroe Islands	10	Faroe Islands	2–1	3–1	UEFA Euro 2024 qualifying
3	14 October 2024	Mikheil Meskhi Stadium, Tbilisi, Georgia	27	Georgia	1–0	1–0	2024–25 UEFA Nations League B
4	9 September 2025	Arena Kombëtare, Tirana, Albania	34	Latvia	1–0	1–0	2026 FIFA World Cup qualification
5	13 November 2025	Estadi de la FAF, Encamp, Andorra	37	Andorra	1–0	1–0	2026 FIFA World Cup qualification
6	26 September 2026	Arena Kombëtare, Tirana, Albania	43	Belarus	1–0	2–0	2026–27 UEFA Nations League C
7	6 October 2026	Arena Kombëtare, Tirana, Albania	46	San Marino	1–0	2–1	2026–27 UEFA Nations League C
8	6 October 2026	Arena Kombëtare, Tirana, Albania	46	San Marino	2–1	2–1	2026–27 UEFA Nations League C

== Honours ==
Empoli

- Serie B: 2020–21

Inter Milan

- Serie A: 2023–24
- Coppa Italia: 2022–23
- Supercoppa Italiana: 2022, 2023
- UEFA Champions League runner-up: 2022–23, 2024–25
