= Mike Maignan =

French footballer (born 1995)

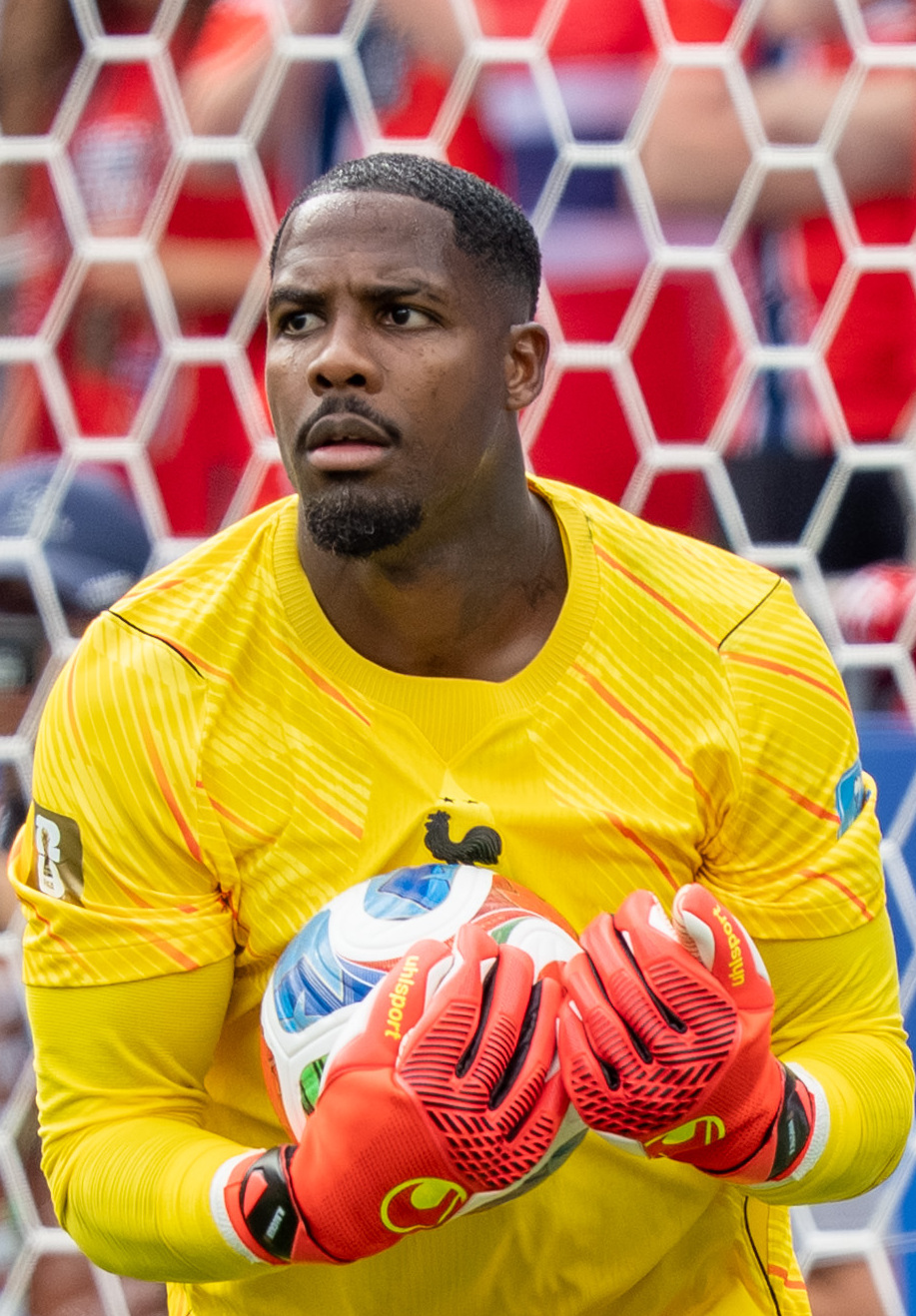
- Maignan with France in 2026

Personal information
- Full name: Mike Peterson Maignan
- Date of birth: 3 July 1995 (age 31)
- Place of birth: Cayenne, French Guiana, France
- Height: 1.91 m (6 ft 3 in)
- Position: Goalkeeper

Team information
- Current team: AC Milan
- Number: 16

Youth career
- 2003–2009: Villiers le Bel JS
- 2009–2012: Paris Saint-Germain

Senior career*
Years	Team	Apps	(Gls)
2012–2015	Paris Saint-Germain II	42	(0)
2015–2017	Lille II	10	(0)
2015–2021	Lille	149	(0)
2021–	AC Milan	169	(0)

International career^{‡}
2010–2011	France U16	10	(0)
2011–2012	France U17	12	(0)
2012–2013	France U18	5	(0)
2013	France U19	3	(0)
2014	France U20	1	(0)
2015–2016	France U21	6	(0)
2020–	France	53	(0)
Medal record
Men's football
Representing France
UEFA Nations League
Winner	2021 Italy
Third place	2025 Germany
- * Club domestic league appearances and goals as of 22:25, 22 November 2026 (UTC) ‡ National team caps and goals as of 22:22, 15 November 2026 (UTC)

Mike Peterson Maignan (Note: French pronunciation: [majk pɛt̪ɛʁsɔ̃ mɛɲɑ̃]) (born 3 July 1995) is a French professional footballer who plays as a goalkeeper for the Serie A club AC Milan, which he captains, and the France national team. Regarded as one of the best goalkeepers in the world, he is known for his positioning, reflexes, and physical presence.

Maignan came through the youth teams at Paris Saint-Germain, where he often served as an unused substitute. In 2015, he joined Lille for €1 million, and became their first-choice goalkeeper in 2017. He was voted Ligue 1's goalkeeper of the year in 2018–19, and won the league title in 2020–21. He transferred to AC Milan in 2021 for €15 million, winning the Serie A league title in his first season and being named the league's best goalkeeper. He was also named to the Serie A Team of the Year for the 2021–22 and 2022–23 seasons. Appointed captain in 2024, he led AC Milan to victory at the 2024–25 Supercoppa Italiana.

After earning 37 caps for France at the youth level, Maignan made his senior international debut in 2020. He was included in France's squads for UEFA Euro 2020 and the 2021 UEFA Nations League, winning the latter tournament. Following the international retirement of Hugo Lloris in January 2023, Maignan established himself as France's first-choice goalkeeper, being named to the UEFA Euro 2024 Team of the Tournament and representing his country at the 2026 FIFA World Cup.

== Early life ==
Mike Peterson Maignan was born on 3 July 1995 in Cayenne, French Guiana, to a Guadeloupean father and a Haitian mother from Aquin. He grew up in Villiers-le-Bel, in the northern suburbs of Paris.

== Club career ==
=== Paris Saint-Germain ===
Maignan played in the lower categories of Paris Saint-Germain before being promoted in 2013 to the first team. He participated in the 2013–14 UEFA Youth League in which his team reached the quarter-finals, being eliminated by Real Madrid.

In June 2013 Maignan signed his first professional contract, of three years. On 18 December, he was in a matchday squad for the first time, sitting on the bench for Nicolas Douchez in a 2–1 win over Saint-Étienne in the last 16 of the Coupe de la Ligue. On 19 January 2014 he was included in a Ligue 1 game for the first time, remaining unused as Salvatore Sirigu played in a 5–0 win over Nantes at the Parc des Princes.

=== Lille ===
In August 2015, Maignan transferred to fellow Ligue 1 club Lille for €1 million on a five-year deal. He made his professional debut on 18 September in a 1–1 draw at Rennes, as a substitute for Yassine Benzia after Vincent Enyeama was sent off in the 69th minute. With his first touch, he saved the penalty from Paul-Georges Ntep; however, in five minutes, he conceded a goal from the same player.

At the start of the 2017–18 season, manager Marcelo Bielsa dropped the experienced Enyeama for Maignan. In the second game of the season, a 3–0 loss at Strasbourg, he was sent off for throwing the ball at an opponent and striker Nicolas de Préville had to go in goal for the final minutes. The following season, he was an ever-present as Lille finished as runners-up to PSG, and was elected Goalkeeper of the year in the Trophées UNFP du football. His record was 30 goals conceded, 17 clean sheets, 233 saves and three penalties saved. In 2020–21, Maignan won the Ligue 1 title, beating his former club PSG on the final day by one point. Maignan finished the season with 21 clean sheets, one short of the league record.

=== AC Milan ===
On 27 May 2021, Maignan agreed to sign for Italian Serie A club AC Milan on a five-year contract, effective from 1 July. He arrived for a reported fee of €15 million, as a replacement for PSG-bound Gianluigi Donnarumma. He made his debut on 23 August, a 1–0 win at Sampdoria. On 19 September, in a league match against Juventus, Maignan was the victim of verbal racial abuse by a Juventus supporter; he responded by calling himself "black and proud". The supporter was later identified and reported to police, and expelled from the Juventus Club Castagnaro fan club.

On 13 October 2021, Maignan underwent surgery to his left wrist injury and he was expected to be out of action for ten weeks, but returned to the field after six weeks. He made crucial saves against Inter Milan, to help his team win a narrow 2–1 derby on 5 February 2022. Eight days later, he assisted Rafael Leão's goal in a 1–0 win against Sampdoria, being the first assist made by an AC Milan goalkeeper in Serie A since Dida in 2006. Maignan was awarded the trophy for Best Goalkeeper in Serie A ahead of the last match of the season on 22 May 2022. Milan won the game 3–0 away to Sassuolo for their first league title since 2011; it was his record 17th clean sheet of the season.

On 18 April 2023, Maignan saved a penalty from Khvicha Kvaratskhelia during a 1–1 away draw against Napoli in the 2022–23 UEFA Champions League quarter-final second leg, which helped his team to qualify to the semi-final, by winning 2–1 on aggregate, for the first time since the 2006–07 season. On 2 December, he assisted Christian Pulisic's goal in a 3–1 win against Frosinone, making him the only goalkeeper in Europe's top 5 leagues to record an assist in each of the last 3 seasons.

In January 2024, after Maignan was allegedly racially abused by Udinese fans, he and his teammates walked off the pitch. Following the incident, Udinese had to play their next game behind closed doors. Initially one Udinese fan was banned for life, before a further four received similar punishments.

In October 2024, he was named captain of Milan, becoming the fifth foreign international to wear the armband for the club. On 6 January 2025, he won the 2024–25 Supercoppa Italiana title with Milan, defeating Inter 3–2 in the final. On 31 January 2026, he extended his contract with the club until 2031.

== International career ==
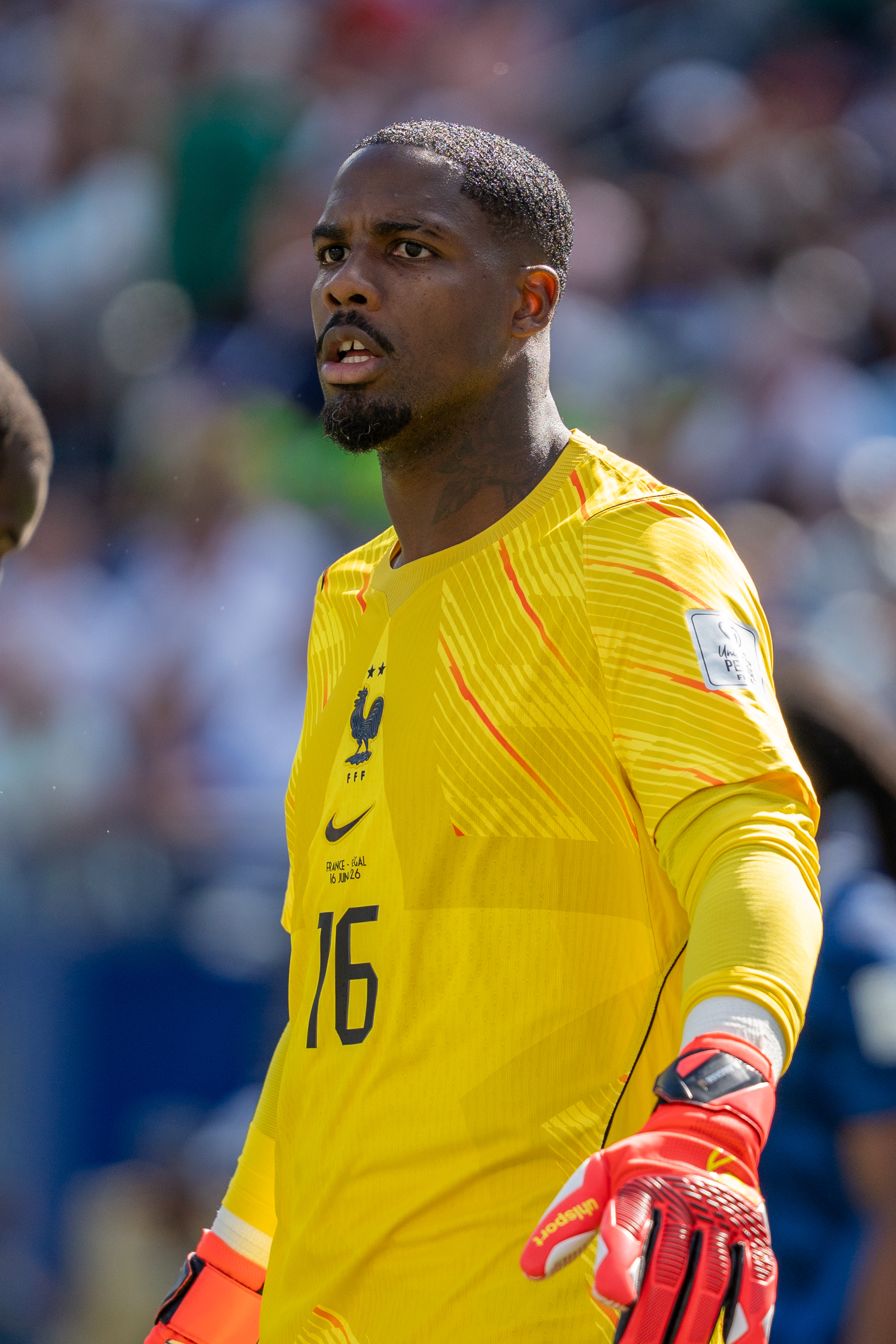
Maignan with France at the 2026 FIFA World Cup

Maignan played for France at every level from under-16 to under-21. He captained the under-17 side at the 2012 European Championship in Slovenia. He received his first senior call-up in May 2019, ahead of UEFA Euro 2020 qualifiers against Turkey and Andorra and a friendly with Bolivia. He made his debut on 7 October 2020 as a half-time substitute for Steve Mandanda in a friendly against Ukraine, which ended as a 7–1 win at the Stade de France. In May 2021, he was called up as a back-up for both the delayed Euro 2020 finals, and to the 2021 UEFA Nations League Finals, with France winning the latter tournament.

On 6 June 2022, Maignan made his competitive international debut in a 1–1 UEFA Nations League draw away to Croatia, conceding a late penalty by Andrej Kramarić. Calf injuries in September and October that year ruled him out of the 2022 FIFA World Cup. Following Hugo Lloris's retirement from international football shortly after the tournament, Maignan was promoted to first-choice goalkeeper for the France national team.

He was France's starting goalkeeper at UEFA Euro 2024, helping France to the semi-finals of the competition, where they were defeated 2–1 by eventual champions Spain. Maignan was named to the team of the tournament for his performances. The following year, he was once again France's starting goalkeeper as the team finished third in the 2025 UEFA Nations League Finals, defeating hosts Germany 2–0 in the third place play-off.

On 14 May 2026, Maignan was selected in the 26-man squad for the 2026 FIFA World Cup as the team's starting goalkeeper. In France's final group match, a 4–1 win over Norway that saw them advance to the knock-out stages as group winners, Maignan saved a penalty kick from Jørgen Strand Larsen. France were eliminated by eventual champions Spain in the semi-final, following a 2–0 defeat. Maignan also started in France's 6–4 defeat to England in the third place play-off.

== Style of play ==
Nicknamed "Magic Mike" in the media, Maignan is considered one of the best goalkeepers in the world by several pundits, journalists, and goalkeepers, including Marissa Thomas of BBC Sport, Liverpool and Brazil national team goalkeeper Alisson Becker, and fellow former Milan goalkeeper Nelson Dida. Maignan is known in particular for his imposing stature, physical power, positioning, reflexes, athletic shot-stopping, and distribution, as well as his leadership qualities and ability to organise the defence.Moreover, he is adept at saving penalties. He is also good at reading the game and coming off his line, which along with his decision-making and ability with the ball at his feet, allows him to function as a sweeper-keeper. Maignan has also been praised in the media for his consistency and decisive performances in important matches. In 2024, goalkeeper Alisson Becker praised Maignan with the following words: "He is physical, quick, he has clean technique. He is very strong. He is one of the best in the world."

== Career statistics ==
=== Club ===
As of match played 22 November 2026

Appearances and goals by club, season and competition
Club	Season	League			National cup (Note: Includes Coupe de France, Coppa Italia)		League cup (Note: Includes Coupe de la Ligue)		Europe		Other		Total	
Club	Season	Division	Apps	Goals	Apps	Goals	Apps	Goals	Apps	Goals	Apps	Goals	Apps	Goals
Paris Saint-Germain II	2012–13	CFA	2	0	—		—		—		—		2	0
Paris Saint-Germain II	2013–14	CFA	19	0	—		—		—		—		19	0
Paris Saint-Germain II	2014–15	CFA	21	0	—		—		—		—		21	0
Paris Saint-Germain II	Total		42	0	—		—		—		—		42	0
Lille II	2015–16	CFA 2	8	0	—		—		—		—		8	0
Lille II	2016–17	CFA	2	0	—		—		—		—		2	0
Lille II	Total		10	0	—		—		—		—		10	0
Lille	2015–16	Ligue 1	4	0	0	0	1	0	—		—		5	0
Lille	2016–17	Ligue 1	7	0	4	0	1	0	—		—		12	0
Lille	2017–18	Ligue 1	34	0	1	0	1	0	—		—		36	0
Lille	2018–19	Ligue 1	38	0	3	0	1	0	—		—		42	0
Lille	2019–20	Ligue 1	28	0	3	0	0	0	6 (Note: Appearances in UEFA Champions League)	0	—		37	0
Lille	2020–21	Ligue 1	38	0	2	0	—		8 (Note: Appearances in UEFA Europa League)	0	—		48	0
Lille	Total		149	0	13	0	4	0	14	0	—		180	0
AC Milan	2021–22	Serie A	32	0	4	0	—		3	0	—		39	0
AC Milan	2022–23	Serie A	22	0	0	0	—		7	0	0	0	29	0
AC Milan	2023–24	Serie A	29	0	1	0	—		12 (Note: Six appearances in UEFA Champions League, six appearances in UEFA Europa League)	0	—		42	0
AC Milan	2024–25	Serie A	37	0	4	0	—		10	0	2 (Note: Appearance(s) in Supercoppa Italiana)	0	53	0
AC Milan	2025–26	Serie A	37	0	3	0	—		—		1	0	41	0
AC Milan	2026–27	Serie A	12	0	0	0	—		3	0	—		15	0
AC Milan	Total		169	0	12	0	—		35	0	3	0	219	0
Career total			370	0	25	0	4	0	49	0	3	0	451	0

=== International ===
As of match played 15 November 2026

Appearances and goals by national team and year
National team	Year	Apps	Goals
France	2020	1	0
France	2022	4	0
France	2023	8	0
France	2024	15	0
France	2025	9	0
France	2026	16	0
Total		53	0

== Honours ==
Lille

- Ligue 1: 2020–21

AC Milan

- Serie A: 2021–22
- Supercoppa Italiana: 2024

France

- UEFA Nations League: 2020–21

Individual

- UNFP Ligue 1 Goalkeeper of the Year: 2018–19
- UNFP Ligue 1 Team of the Year: 2018–19
- Serie A Best Goalkeeper: 2021–22
- Serie A Team of the Year: 2021–22, 2022–23
- UEFA European Championship Team of the Tournament: 2024
