= Buti, Iran =

Buti (Persian: بوتي) may refer to:

- Buti-ye Bala
- Buti-ye Pain
