= Cascine =

Cascine may refer to:

- Cascine (Louisburg, North Carolina), a historic plantation complex in North Carolina, United States
- Cascine di Buti, a village in Buti, Italy

== See also ==
- Cascina (disambiguation)
