= Buti (surname) =

Buti is an Italian surname. Notable people with the name include:

- Arianna Buti, elected mayor of Buti, Tuscany in 2021, defeating the unrelated Monia Buti
- Bimla Buti (born 1933), Indian physicist
- Buti Manamela, South African politician
- Carlo Buti (1902–1963), Italian interpreter of popular and folk music
- Caterina Buti del Vacca, possible mother of Leonardo da Vinci
- Lateefa Buti, Kuwaiti writer
- Lucrezia Buti (1435-?), Italian nun
- Ludovico Buti (1560–1611), Italian painter
- Ramadan al-Buti, also known as Muhammad Said Ramadan al-Bouti, Muslim scholar
- Simone Buti (born 1983), Italian volleyball player
- Tony Buti (born 1961), Australian politician

== See also ==
- Buti, Tuscany, a village in Italy
- Buti (given name)
