= Tammy Abraham =

English footballer (born 1997)

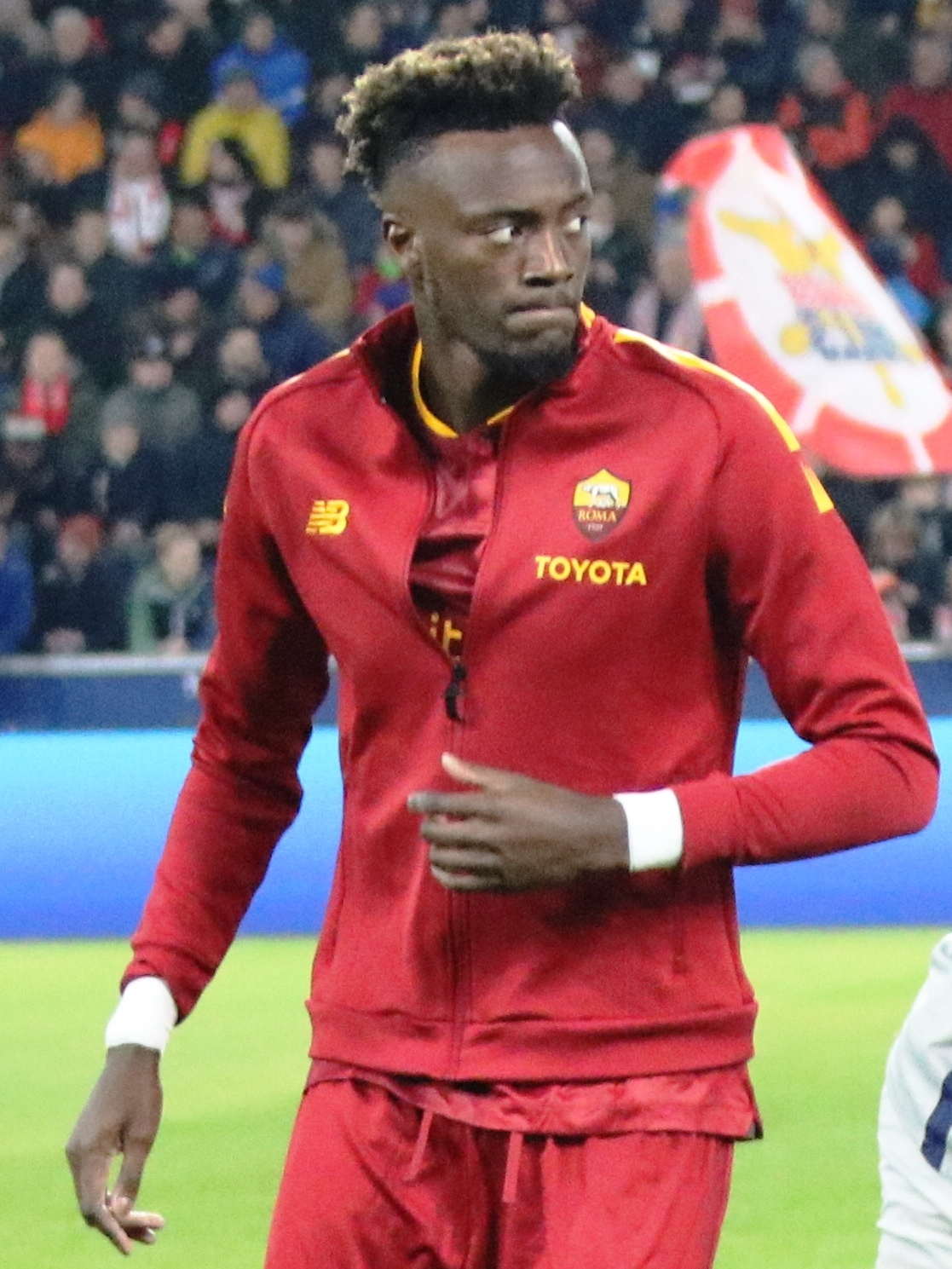
- Abraham warming up for Roma in 2023

Personal information
- Full name: Kevin Oghenetega Tamaraebi Bakumo-Abraham
- Date of birth: 2 October 1997 (age 29)
- Place of birth: Camberwell, England
- Height: 6 ft 4 in (1.94 m)
- Position: Striker

Team information
- Current team: Aston Villa
- Number: 18

Youth career
- 2004–2016: Chelsea

Senior career*
Years	Team	Apps	(Gls)
2016–2021	Chelsea	58	(21)
2016–2017	→ Bristol City (loan)	41	(23)
2017–2018	→ Swansea City (loan)	31	(5)
2018–2019	→ Aston Villa (loan)	37	(25)
2021–2026	Roma	84	(26)
2024–2025	→ AC Milan (loan)	28	(3)
2025–2026	→ Beşiktaş (loan)	18	(7)
2026	Beşiktaş	0	(0)
2026–	Aston Villa	16	(2)

International career^{‡}
2014–2015	England U18	5	(2)
2015–2016	England U19	14	(5)
2016–2019	England U21	25	(9)
2017–2022	England	11	(3)
- * Club domestic league appearances and goals as of 16:20, 19 September 2026 (UTC) ‡ National team caps and goals as of 11 June 2022

Kevin Oghenetega Tamaraebi Bakumo-Abraham (born 2 October 1997), known as Tammy Abraham, is an English professional footballer who plays as a striker for Premier League club Aston Villa.

A Chelsea academy graduate, Abraham made his first-team debut for the club in 2016. He subsequently spent a season on loan with Championship club Bristol City, where he won the club's Player of the Season, Young Player of the Season, and top goalscorer awards, the first player ever to do so in a single season. After spending the following season at Swansea City in the Premier League, he was then loaned to Championship side Aston Villa, where in 2019 he became the first player in 40 years to score 25 goals in a single league campaign for the club.

Abraham returned to Chelsea in 2019, recording 18 goals during their 2019–20 campaign, before lifting the UEFA Champions League the following season. After joining Roma in the Serie A for a €40 million fee in 2021, he scored 17 goals in his debut Serie A season, a record high for an Englishman, and also won the inaugural edition of the UEFA Europa Conference League. After loan spells with fellow Italian side AC Milan and Turkish club Beşiktaş, he rejoined Aston Villa permanently in 2026, winning the UEFA Europa League with the club.

Formerly an England youth international, Abraham represented the nation from under-18 level, and featured at the 2017 UEFA European Under-21 Championship in Poland. He made his senior debut in November 2017.

== Club career ==
=== Chelsea ===
==== 2004–2016: Youth career ====
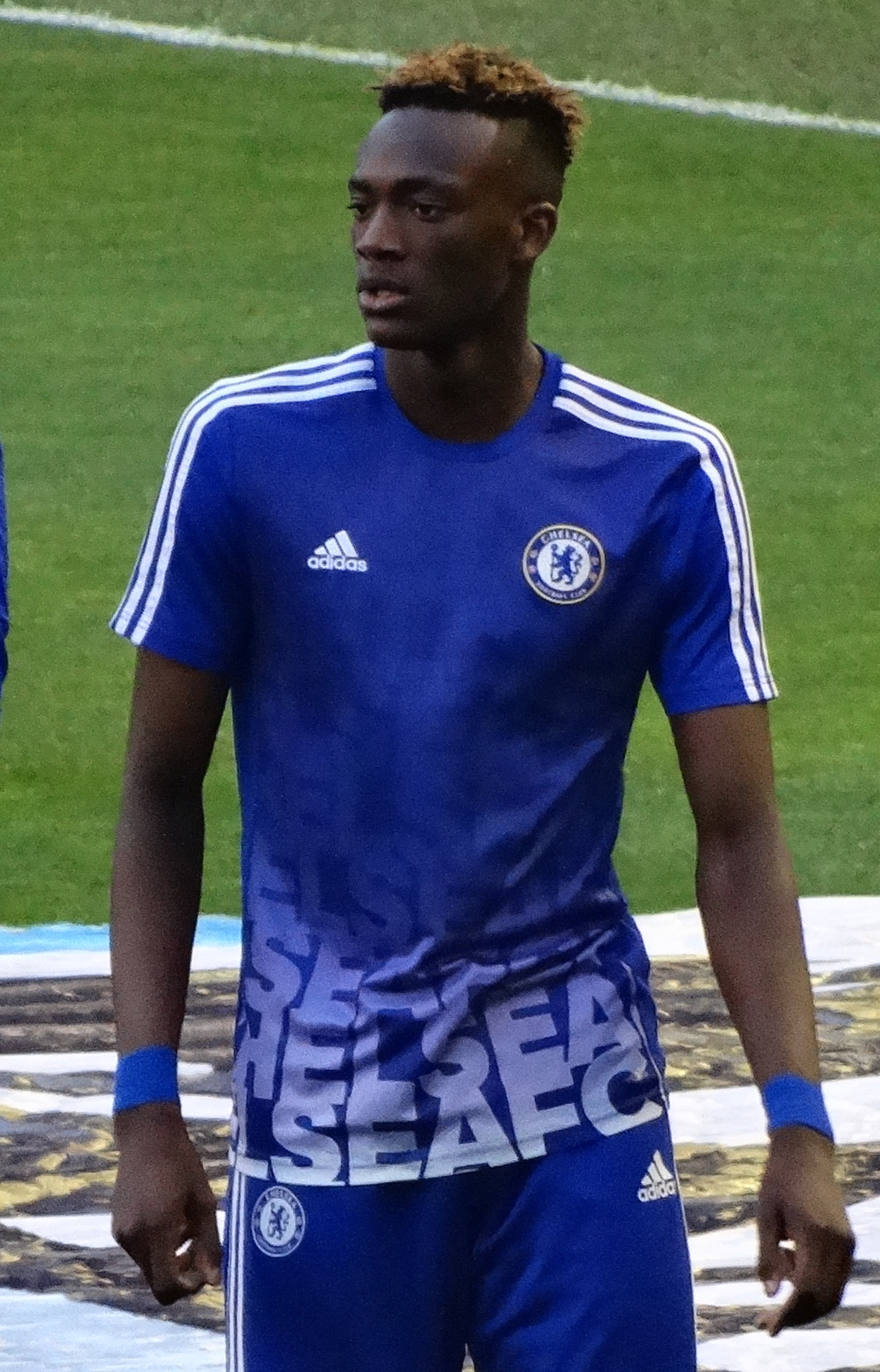
Abraham warming up for Chelsea in 2016

Abraham joined Chelsea at under-eight level and progressed through the club's academy system. He was part of the Chelsea youth team which recorded consecutive triumphs in both the UEFA Youth League and the FA Youth Cup in 2015 and 2016. In the 2015–16 edition of the UEFA Youth League, Abraham pitched in with a return of eight goals in nine matches, making him the tournament's second highest goal scorer behind Roberto. He carried his form into the FA Youth Cup and netted the winning goal in Chelsea's victory over Manchester City in the final in April. During the 2014–15 and 2015–16 seasons, Abraham scored 74 goals in 98 matches across all competitions for Chelsea's various youth teams.

His form at youth level caught the attention of interim manager Guus Hiddink who invited him to train with the first team at the back end of the 2015–16 season. On 11 May 2016, Hiddink handed Abraham his Chelsea debut in a 1–1 Premier League draw with Liverpool, bringing him on to replace Bertrand Traoré in the 74th minute. Abraham then made his home debut at Stamford Bridge the following week, once again coming on as a second-half substitute for Traoré in a 1–1 draw with newly crowned Premier League Champions Leicester City.

==== 2016–17 season: Loan to Bristol City ====
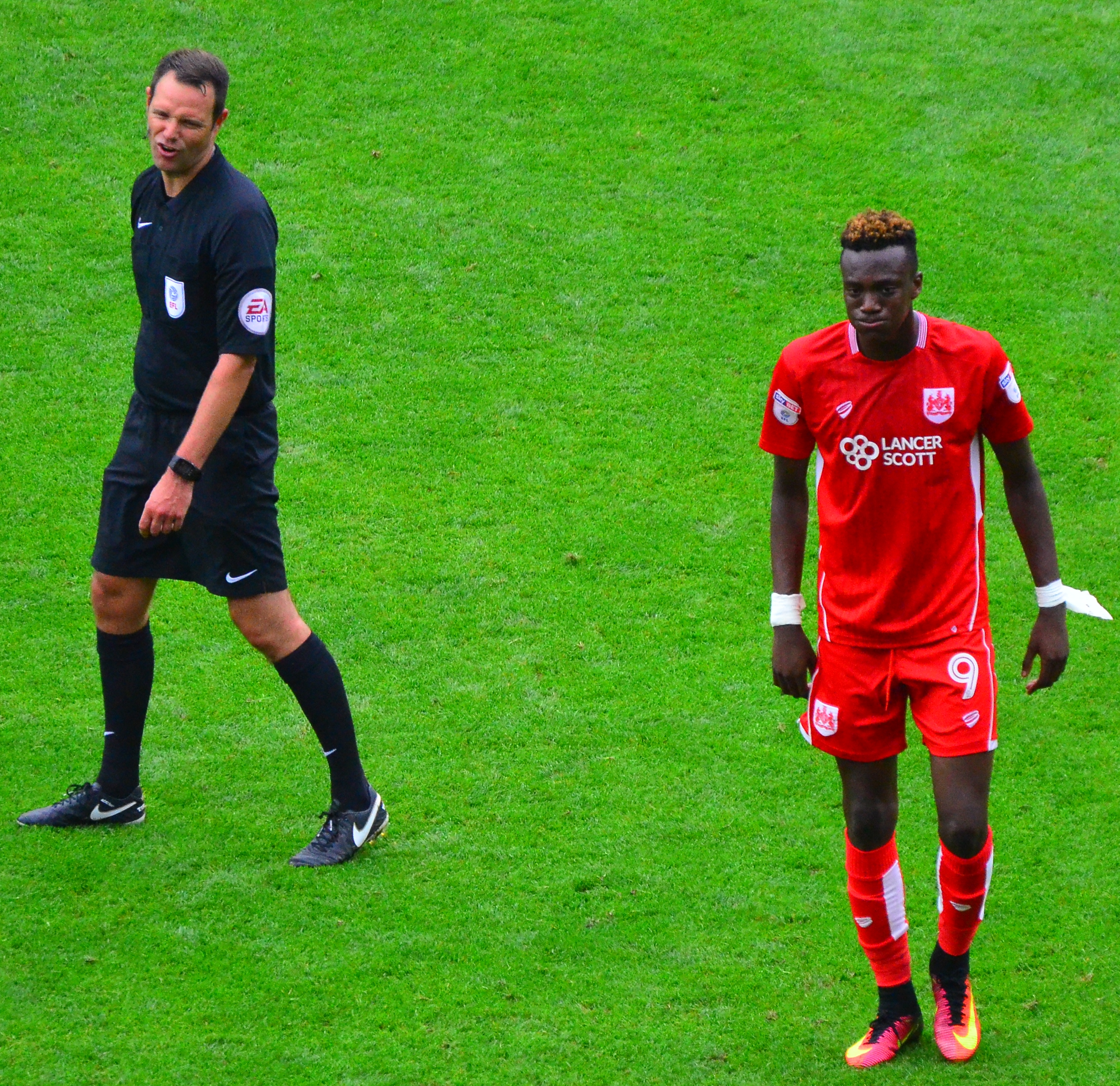
Abraham (right) playing for Bristol City in 2016

On 5 August 2016, Abraham signed for Championship club Bristol City on a season-long loan from Chelsea. He made his debut for the club the following day, coming off the bench for fellow debutant Josh Brownhill to score City's first goal in a 2–1 come-from-behind win over Wigan Athletic, although the goal was later credited to Hörður Magnússon instead. He started in his second game and scored the only goal of the match in a 1–0 win over Wycombe Wanderers, helping Bristol City advance to the Second Round of the EFL Cup. The following week, on 13 August, he scored his first professional brace in a 2–1 victory over newly promoted Burton Albion, including the last-minute winner. In September, Abraham scored his second brace against Sheffield Wednesday, although Bristol City ultimately lost 3–2. He scored a further two goals during the month which saw him named Championship Player of the Month for September. He was also awarded the EFL Young Player of the Month award for September.

On 31 January 2017, Abraham scored his 16th Championship goal in a 2–2 draw against Sheffield Wednesday, which saw him break the record of former Fulham striker Moussa Dembélé for the most goals scored by a teenager since the beginning of the Football League Championship era. Abraham ended the season with 23 goals to his name, second only to Chris Wood of Leeds United, as City completed the campaign in 17th position, thereby avoiding relegation. His performances throughout the season also earned him Bristol City's Player of the Year, Young Player of the Year and Top Goalscorer awards. In doing so, he became the first ever player to earn all three awards in the same season.

==== 2017–18 season: Loan to Swansea City ====
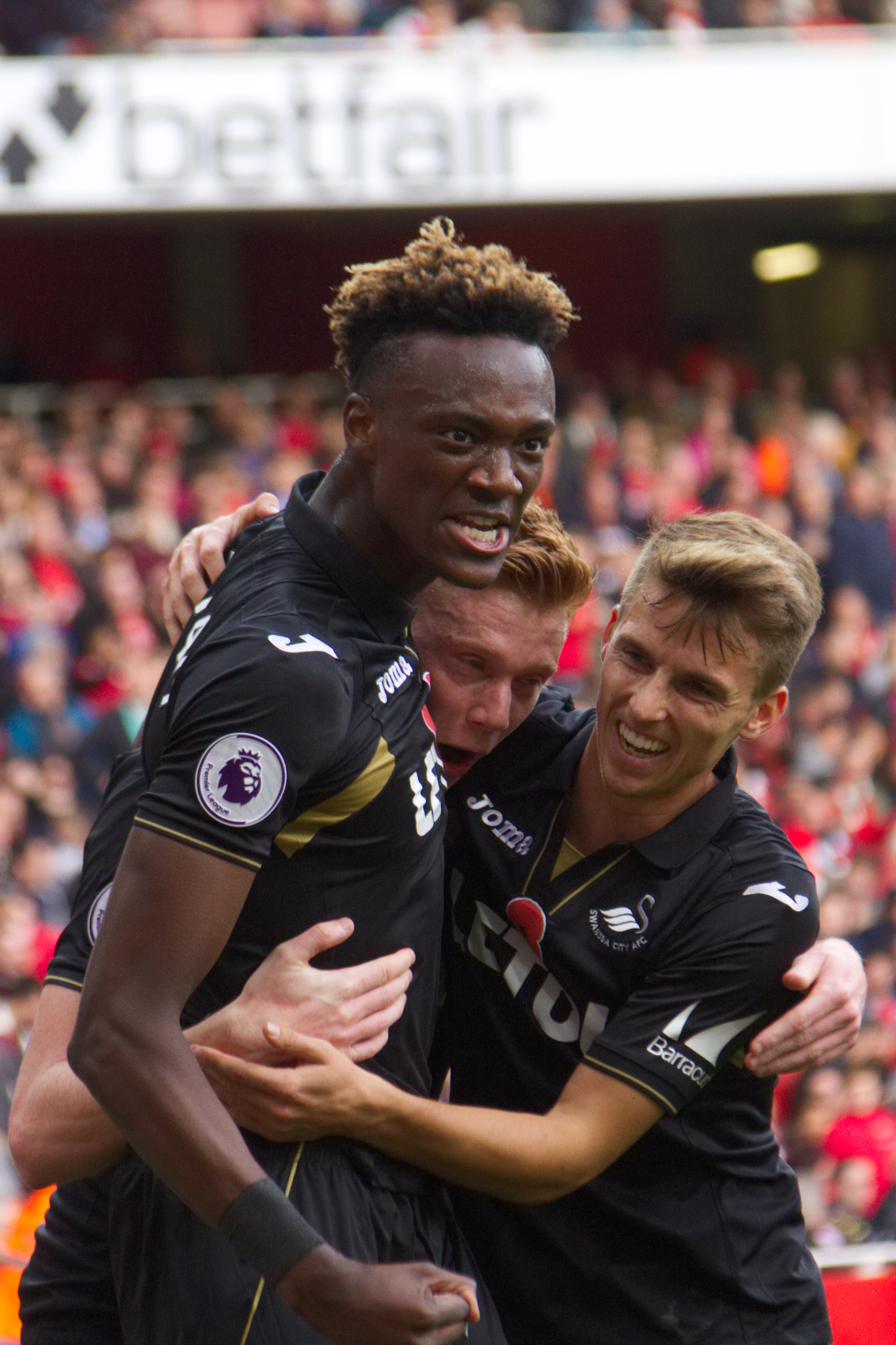
Abraham celebrating a Swansea City goal in 2017

On 4 July 2017, Chelsea announced that Abraham had signed a new five-year contract with the club and later that day he joined fellow Premier League club Swansea City on a season-long loan. He made his debut for the club on 12 August, starting in a 0–0 draw with Southampton. Ten days later, he scored his first goal in a 4–1 League Cup win over League One team Milton Keynes Dons before scoring his first Premier League goal in his next match, opening the scoring in a 2–0 victory over Crystal Palace. On 14 October 2017, he scored his first brace for his club in a 2–0 win over newly promoted Huddersfield Town which secured Swansea their first home win of the season. Both club and player struggled for form thereafter, however, and by the end of the year Abraham had failed to add to his goal tally.

On 6 February 2018, having gone 825 minutes without a goal, Abraham returned to the scoresheet when he netted twice and assisted a further two in an 8–1 FA Cup Fourth Round replay win over Notts County. The result was also Swansea's biggest ever win in the competition. On 7 April, he scored his first league goal since his double in October. His goal earned Swansea a late draw against West Brom and edged the club a point closer to safety from the relegation zone, though they were ultimately relegated on the final day of the season following a defeat to Stoke City. Abraham scored eight goals in 39 appearances across all competitions during his loan spell with the club.

==== 2018–19 season: Loan to Aston Villa ====
Following his return from loan at Swansea, new Chelsea manager Maurizio Sarri indicated that he planned to keep Abraham at Chelsea and included him in the squad for the club's Community Shield defeat to Manchester City. On 31 August, however, he was sent out on loan once again, returning to the Championship to sign for Aston Villa for the remainder of the season. He made his debut for the club on 15 September, starting in a 1–1 draw with Blackburn Rovers, and scored on his home debut four days later in a 2–0 win over Rotherham United. On 28 November, he scored four goals in a 5–5 draw with Nottingham Forest in the league; the first time a draw of that score had ever been played out to at Villa Park. In doing so, he became the first Aston Villa player to score four goals in a single match in the 21st century. He was later named Championship Player of the Month for November after scoring six goals in four appearances for the month.

By the turn of the year, Abraham had scored 16 goals in 20 appearances and was the joint-top goalscorer in the league. His strong form sparked speculation that he would be recalled by Chelsea, who retained the option until 14 January 2019, given the club's own goal scoring troubles. It later became apparent that Premier League side Wolverhampton Wanderers had also made an approach for his signature, although FIFA's rules prohibiting a player from representing three clubs in a season cast doubt over any potential move. Following a week of media speculation surrounding his future, he reportedly rejected a loan move to Wolves in favour of staying with Villa for the remainder of the season.

On 26 January, he scored a brace in a 2–1 win over Ipswich Town and in doing so became the first player since Tom Waring in 1933 to score in seven consecutive home games for the club. The following month, he became the first player since Peter Withe in 1981 to score 20 goals for the club in a single season when he scored in a 3–3 come–from–behind draw with Sheffield United. On 30 March, he scored his 50th career league goal when he opened the scoring in a 2–1 win over Blackburn. In April, after scoring in a 2–0 win over Bolton Wanderers, Abraham became the first Villa player to score 25 goals in a season since Andy Gray in 1977. His goal also helped the club equal its record of nine successive wins, set back in 1910. He was later named in the PFA Team of the Year before helping Aston Villa secure promotion to the Premier League, scoring once in the play-off semi-final against West Brom. He ended the campaign with 26 goals in 40 appearances, the second-most by any player in the league behind Norwich City's Teemu Pukki.

==== 2019–20 season ====
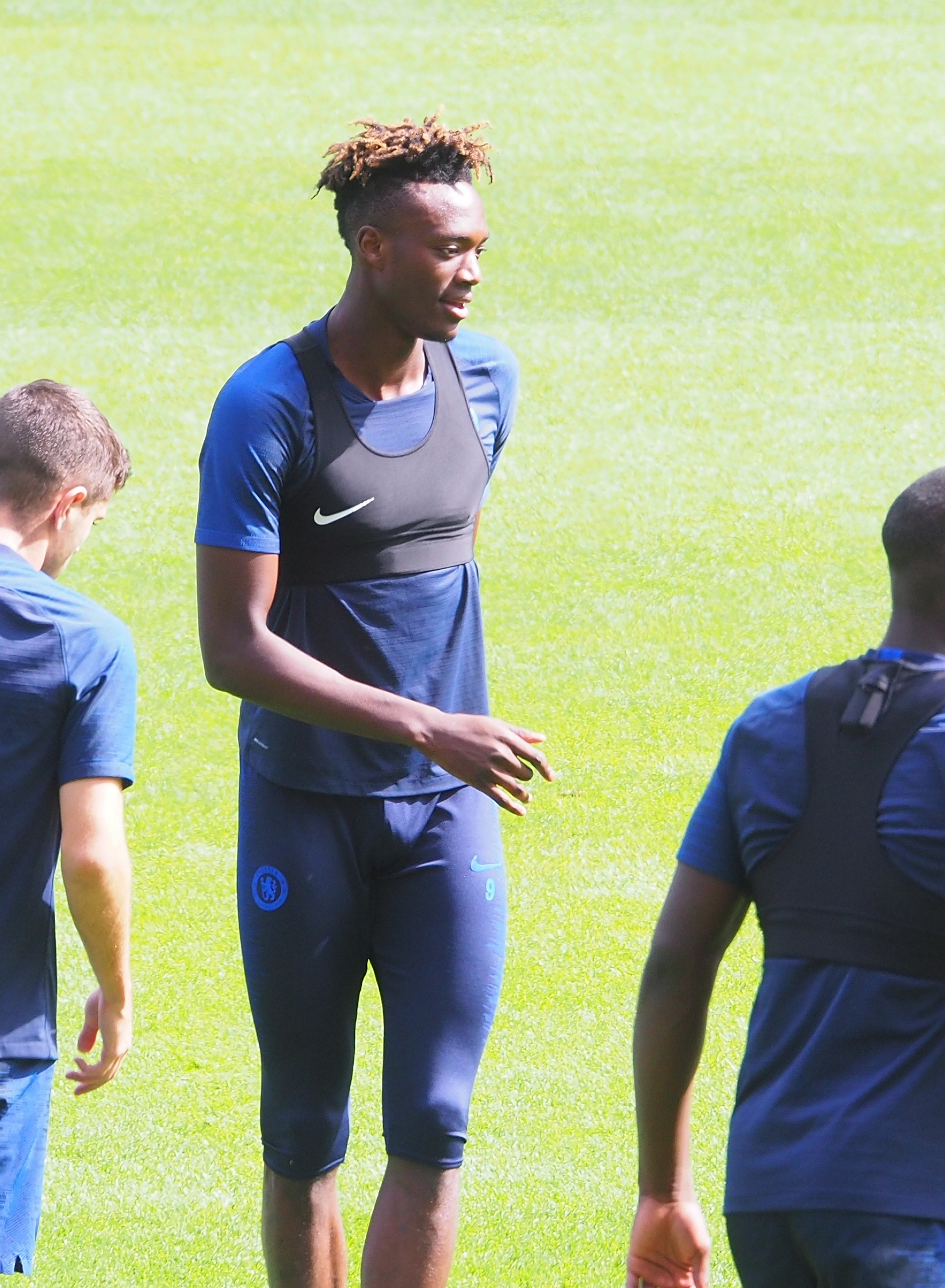
Abraham warming up for Chelsea in 2019

Following the expiration of his loan, Abraham returned to Chelsea where he was given the No. 9 shirt. In the 2019 UEFA Super Cup against Liverpool on 14 August, he won a penalty in extra-time, from which Jorginho scored to level the scores at 2–2 and send the match to a penalty shoot-out. Abraham then took the deciding penalty in the shootout but saw his effort saved by Adrián resulting in Chelsea losing the tie 5–4. Following the match, he was victim of racial abuse on Twitter. Ten days later, Abraham scored his first Chelsea goals when he netted a brace in a 3–2 away win over Norwich City. The following month, during a 5–2 win over Wolves, he scored his first Chelsea hat trick, before netting an own goal during the latter stages of the match. In doing so, at the age of 21 years and 347 days, he became the youngest player to score three goals in a match for the club in the Premier League era. He scored his first Champions League goal in a 2–1 win away to Lille on 2 October.

==== 2020–21 season ====
On 23 September 2020, Abraham played as a starter for the first time in 2020–21 season and scored his first goal of the season against Barnsley in the third round of the EFL Cup, which ended in a 6–0 win. Abraham scored a goal in two consecutive matches including his most recent against West Brom on 26 September, where he scored a stoppage-time equaliser in a 3–3 draw at The Hawthorns. In November, he scored in three successive games, wins against Sheffield United, Rennes and Newcastle United. In addition, he netted his first UEFA Champions League goal in a 3–0 victory over Rennes.

Abraham scored a hat-trick in the fourth round of the FA Cup on 24 January 2021, as Chelsea overcame Championship club Luton Town by a score of 3–1. In doing so, Abraham became the first Englishman to score a hat-trick for Chelsea in the FA Cup since Frank Lampard in 2007, and he also became the first Chelsea youth team product to score 10 or more goals in back-to-back seasons since Mike Fillery in 1982–83.

=== Roma ===
Abraham signed for Serie A club Roma on 17 August 2021 on a five-year contract, with the transfer fee reported to be £34 million, with Chelsea including a £68 million buy-back clause which could only be triggered after the player had completed two seasons with Roma.

==== 2021–22 season ====
Abraham made his Serie A debut on 22 August, assisting twice as Roma defeated Fiorentina 3–1. Four days later, he made his UEFA Europa Conference League debut in a 3–0 home win over Trabzonspor. On 29 August, he scored his first goal for Roma in a 4–0 win against Salernitana. On 16 September, he scored his first goal in the Conference League, completing the Giallorossi's 5–1 victory against CSKA Sofia. On 20 January 2022, he made his first appearance in the Coppa Italia, contributing to 3–1 home win over Lecce with a goal and an assist. Three days later, he scored a brace in the victorious away match against Empoli, becoming the first English player in thirty years to score more than 10 goals in a Serie A season. On 25 May, he played in the Conference League final which ended in a 1–0 victory for Roma over Feyenoord.

==== 2022–23 season ====
On 8 January 2023, in the league match against Milan, Abraham scored in extra time, earning Roma a 2–2 draw against the Serie A champions. A week later on 15 January, he provided two assists for Paulo Dybala in a 2–0 win against Fiorentina in the Serie A. On 31 May, Abraham featured in the Europa League final, which Roma lost against Sevilla 4–1 on penalties after a 1–1 draw; hence, he missed the opportunity to win all existing UEFA competitions. Abraham received criticism for his goalscoring form, having scored only 8 goals in the Serie A compared to 17 the previous season. On the final matchday of the season against Spezia, he suffered a sprain which caused a tear to his anterior cruciate ligament.

==== 2023–24 season ====
Following his ACL injury, Abraham returned to the field on 6 April 2024 in a 1–0 win over city rivals Lazio. He scored a late equaliser against Napoli on 28 April, which was his only goal of the season, having made just 12 appearances (eight in the league and four in the Europa League).

==== 2024–25 season: Loan to AC Milan ====
On 30 August 2024, Abraham joined fellow Serie A club AC Milan on loan for the 2024–25 season. On 14 September, he scored his first goal for the club from a penalty in a 4–0 win over Venezia. On 6 October, in the 1–2 loss to Fiorentina, he missed a penalty kick after controversially stripping the ball from Milan's designated penalty taker Christian Pulisic. After the match he was reprimanded by manager Paulo Fonseca for his actions. On 6 January 2025, he scored a stoppage-time goal, securing a 3–2 victory over Inter Milan in the Supercoppa Italiana final. On 5 February, Abraham scored a brace against his parent club to help knock Roma out of the 2024–25 Coppa Italia in a 3–1 win.

=== Beşiktaş ===
==== 2025–2026: Loan ====
On 2 July 2025, Beşiktaş announced that Abraham had completed his medical examinations in preparation for his loan move to the club. On 7 August, Abraham scored a hat-trick in his side's 4–1 win away to Irish club St Patrick's Athletic in the third qualifying round of the UEFA Conference League.

==== 2026: Permanent deal at Beşiktaş ====
On 26 January 2026, Beşiktaş announced that they had agreed a permanent transfer for Abraham for €13m.

=== Return to Aston Villa ===
Abraham was at Beşiktaş on a permanent basis for one day, before, on 27 January 2026, he re-joined Premier League club Aston Villa for an undisclosed fee, reported to be around £18m. Abraham scored his first goal on his return to Aston Villa on 14 February 2026, in a 3–1 FA Cup loss to Newcastle United. Later that season, he won the UEFA Europa League with the club, becoming only the second player after Emerson Palmieri to win every UEFA club competition.

== International career ==
Prior to receiving his first competitive cap for the England senior team in October 2019, Abraham was eligible to represent Nigeria through his parents lineage and was sounded out by the Nigerian Football Association. Abraham's father is close friends with Nigeria Football Federation President, Amaju Pinnick and on 21 September 2017, Pinnick claimed that Abraham had switched his allegiance to Nigeria. Abraham issued a statement the same day denying the claim and reaffirming his availability for England selection. Upon receiving his first England call-up in November 2017, Abraham stated that there was never any prospect of him choosing to play for Nigeria.

=== Youth ===
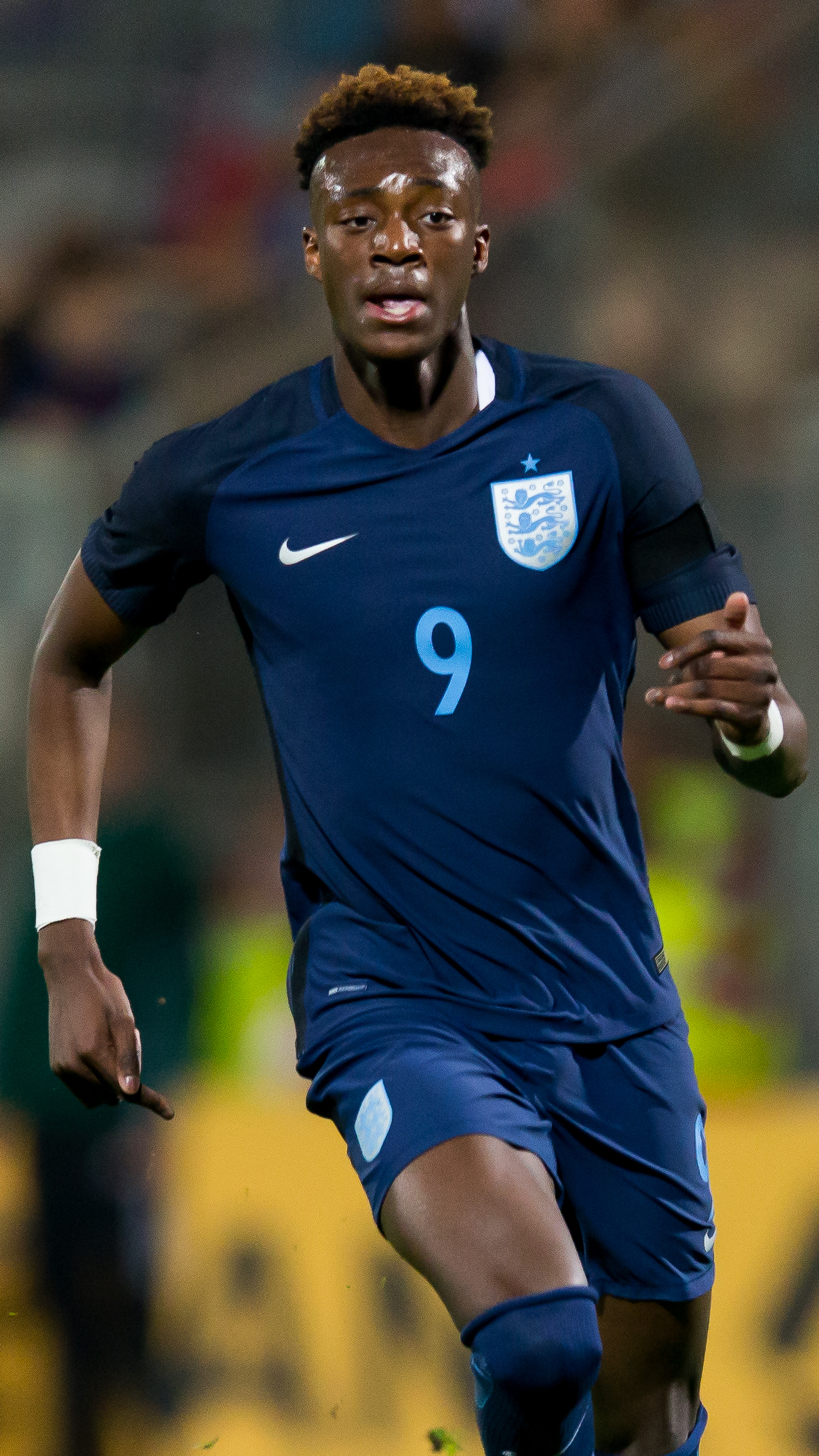
Abraham playing for England U21 in 2017

Abraham represented England at both under-18 and under-19 level. He scored his first goals at age group level for England in March 2015, netting a brace as England U18 defeated Switzerland 6–1. Later that year, while representing the U19 team in a friendly against Japan, Abraham and teammate Patrick Roberts played a game of rock paper scissors on the pitch to decide who would take a penalty. Abraham was triumphant but missed the resultant spot-kick. Just a minute later, however, Roberts assisted Abraham for the second goal of the match, which ultimately ended 5–1 in England's favour.

On 6 July 2016, Abraham was one of four Chelsea players named in Aidy Boothroyd's squad for the U19 European Championship. He featured in three out of four matches as England were eliminated by Italy in the semi-final.

Abraham received his first England U21 call-up on 29 September 2016. He made his first appearance for the team on 6 October, coming on as a substitute with eight minutes remaining against Kazakhstan in a qualifier for the U21 European Championships to help England to a 1–0 victory which secured the nation's progression to the tournament proper. He made his full debut for the U21s in their final qualifying group match against Bosnia and Herzegovina and netted twice in a 5–0 victory for England.

The following year, he was named in the England squad for the 2017 UEFA European Under-21 Championship in Poland. He scored his first, and only goal for the tournament in the semi-final against Germany. England ultimately lost the match after a penalty shoot-out, with Abraham one of the players who missed his spot-kick.

On 18 May 2018, having been omitted from England's squad for the 2018 FIFA World Cup, Abraham was recalled to the under-20 side for the Toulon Tournament in France where they had been drawn in a group alongside Qatar, China and Mexico. On 27 May, England opened their title defence with a 2–1 win over China in which Abraham scored the winning goal. He did not feature in the subsequent match against Mexico but returned to score in a 4–0 win over Qatar which saw England qualify for the semi-finals where they were drawn against Scotland. Abraham was only used as a late substitute as England defeated Scotland but was selected to start in the final where they met Mexico. There he failed to score, hitting the post in the second half, but England won their third successive title with a 2–1 win.

On 27 May 2019, Abraham was included in England's 23-man squad for the 2019 UEFA European Under-21 Championship.

=== Senior ===
On 2 November 2017, Abraham was one of three uncapped players called up to the senior England team for friendlies against Germany and Brazil. He made his debut against the former on 10 November, starting in a 0–0 draw at Wembley Stadium.

In October 2019, he said he remained undecided on his international future, as he remained eligible for Nigeria as he had not played a competitive fixture for England's senior side. Later that month he received a call-up to the England squad for forthcoming UEFA Euro 2020 qualifying matches. On 11 October, Abraham made his first competitive appearance for England against the Czech Republic, appearing as a substitute and committing himself to England in the process. Abraham scored his first goal for England on 14 November 2019 in a 7–0 win over Montenegro in Euro 2020 qualifying.

== Personal life ==
Abraham was born in Camberwell, Greater London, to Nigerian parents. He was an Arsenal fan growing up. He has a younger brother, Timmy Abraham, who is also a footballer and plays for Gosport Borough.

In January 2017, Abraham was involved in a motor vehicle accident while on loan at Bristol City. At the time of the accident, he was alleged to have been driving without a licence or insurance, and was summoned to court as a result. He later obtained his licence, passing the test in March of the same year.

== Career statistics ==
=== Club ===
As of match played 3 November 2026

Appearances and goals by club, season and competition
Club	Season	League			National cup (Note: Includes FA Cup, Coppa Italia, Turkish Cup)		League cup (Note: Includes EFL Cup)		Europe		Other		Total	
Club	Season	Division	Apps	Goals	Apps	Goals	Apps	Goals	Apps	Goals	Apps	Goals	Apps	Goals
Chelsea	2015–16	Premier League	2	0	0	0	0	0	0	0	0	0	2	0
Chelsea	2018–19	Premier League	0	0	—		—		—		1 (Note: Appearance in FA Community Shield)	0	1	0
Chelsea	2019–20	Premier League	34	15	3	0	1	0	8 (Note: Appearances in UEFA Champions League)	3	1 (Note: Appearances in UEFA Super Cup)	0	47	18
Chelsea	2020–21	Premier League	22	6	3	4	2	1	5	1	—		32	12
Chelsea	Total		58	21	6	4	3	1	13	4	2	0	82	30
Bristol City (loan)	2016–17	Championship	41	23	3	0	4	3	—		—		48	26
Swansea City (loan)	2017–18	Premier League	31	5	5	2	3	1	—		—		39	8
Aston Villa (loan)	2018–19	Championship	37	25	0	0	—		—		3 (Note: Appearances in Championship play-offs)	1	40	26
Roma	2021–22	Serie A	37	17	2	1	—		14 (Note: Appearances in UEFA Europa Conference League)	9	—		53	27
Roma	2022–23	Serie A	38	8	2	0	—		14 (Note: Appearances in UEFA Europa League)	1	—		54	9
Roma	2023–24	Serie A	8	1	0	0	—		4	0	—		12	1
Roma	2024–25	Serie A	1	0	—		—		—		—		1	0
Roma	Total		84	26	4	1	—		32	10	—		120	37
AC Milan (loan)	2024–25	Serie A	28	3	5	4	—		9	2	2 (Note: Appearances in Supercoppa Italiana)	1	44	10
Beşiktaş (loan)	2025–26	Süper Lig	18	7	2	1	—		6 (Note: Two appearances and one goal in UEFA Europa League, four appearances and four goals in UEFA Conference League)	5	—		26	13
Aston Villa	2025–26	Premier League	12	2	1	1	—		3	0	—		16	3
Aston Villa	2026–27	Premier League	4	0	0	0	2	2	4	1	1	0	11	3
Aston Villa	Total		16	2	1	1	2	2	7	1	1	0	27	6
Career total			313	112	26	13	12	7	67	22	8	2	426	156

=== International ===
As of match played 11 June 2022

Appearances and goals by national team and year
National team	Year	Apps	Goals
England	2017	2	0
England	2019	2	1
England	2020	2	0
England	2021	4	2
England	2022	1	0
Total		11	3

As of match played 11 June 2022
England score listed first, score column indicates score after each Abraham goal

List of international goals scored by Tammy Abraham
No.	Date	Venue	Cap	Opponent	Score	Result	Competition	Ref.
1	14 November 2019	Wembley Stadium, London, England	4	Montenegro	7–0	7–0	UEFA Euro 2020 qualifying	
2	9 October 2021	Estadi Nacional, Andorra la Vella, Andorra	7	Andorra	3–0	5–0	2022 FIFA World Cup qualification	
3	15 November 2021	Stadio Olimpico di San Marino, Serravalle, San Marino	10	San Marino	9–0	10–0	2022 FIFA World Cup qualification	

== Honours ==
Aston Villa

- UEFA Europa League: 2025–26
- EFL Championship play-offs: 2019

Chelsea

- UEFA Champions League: 2020–21
- UEFA Super Cup: 2021
- FA Cup runner-up: 2019–20

Roma

- UEFA Europa Conference League: 2021–22

AC Milan

- Supercoppa Italiana: 2024–25

England U21

- Toulon Tournament: 2018

Individual

- EFL Championship Player of the Month: November 2018
- Bristol City Player of the Season: 2016–17
- Bristol City Young Player of the Season: 2016–17
- PFA Team of the Year: 2018–19 Championship
- UEFA Europa Conference League Team of the Season: 2021–22
- Coppa Italia top scorer: 2024–25
