= 2025 Supercoppa Italiana final (January) =

Final of the 37th edition of Supercoppa Italiana

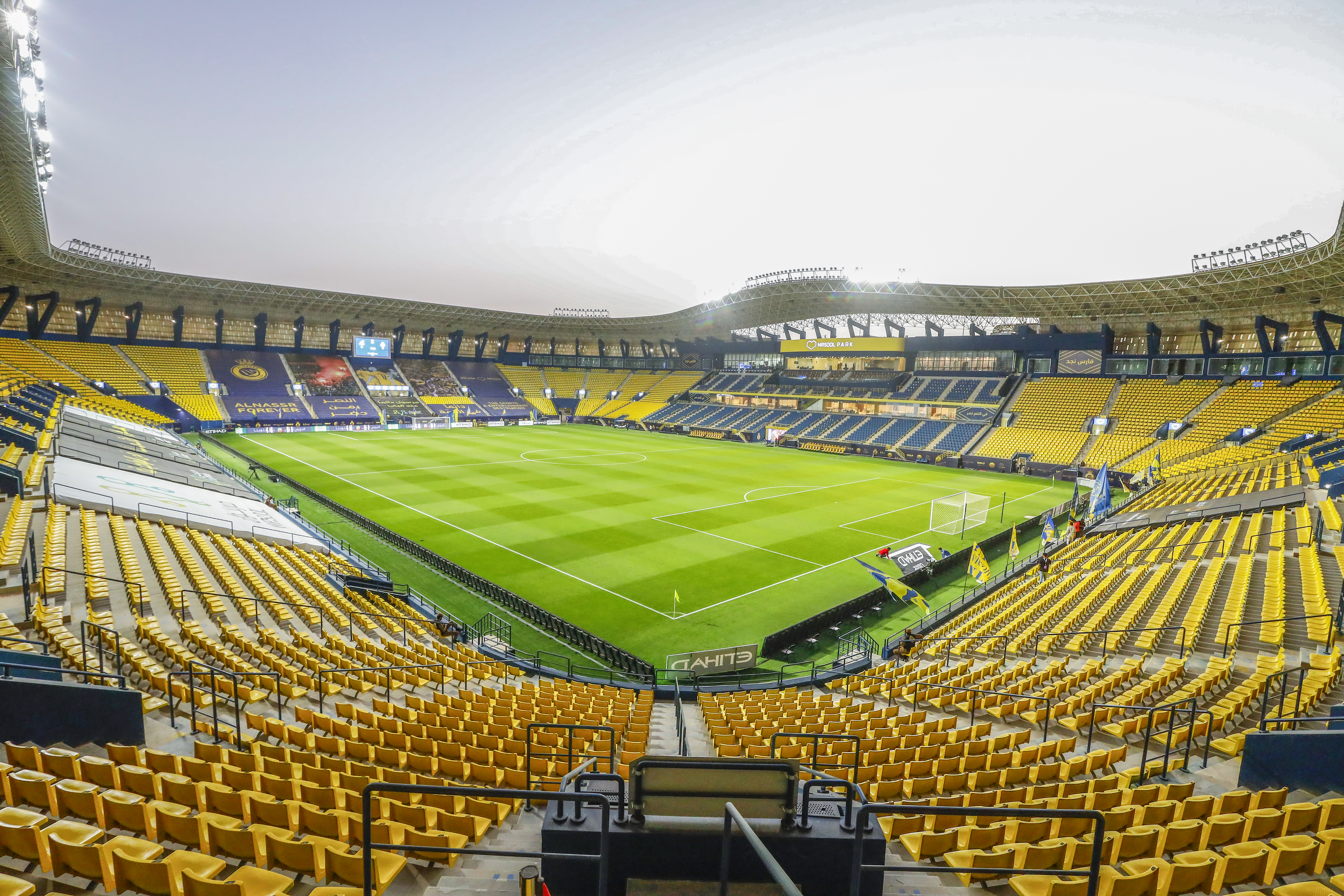
- The King Saud University Stadium in Riyadh hosted the final.
- Event: 2024–25 Supercoppa Italiana
Inter Milan	AC Milan
2	3
- Date: 6 January 2025
- Venue: King Saud University Stadium, Riyadh
- Man of the Match: Tammy Abraham (AC Milan)
- Referee: Simone Sozza
- Attendance: 24,841

The 2024–25 Supercoppa Italiana final was a football match to decide the winners of the 2024–25 Supercoppa Italiana, the Italian football super cup. It was the 37th edition of the annual tournament, which was also the second edition to feature a final match in the new four-team format. The match was played on 6 January 2025 at the King Saud University Stadium in Riyadh, Saudi Arabia. It was a clash between cross-city rivals Inter Milan and AC Milan, which were the 2023–24 Serie A champions and runners-up, respectively.

AC Milan won the match 3–2 for their eighth Supercoppa Italiana title.

== Background ==
This was the 241st competitive Derby della Madonnina and the third happened in the Supercoppa Italiana, having met in the 2011 and 2022 editions; AC Milan won the former and Inter won the latter. Inter Milan were aiming for their fourth consecutive and a joint-record ninth Supercoppa titles, while Milan were aiming for their eighth title and the first since 2016. Milan won the most recent meeting between the sides, a 2–1 league victory on 22 September 2024.

== Teams ==
Team	Qualification for tournament	Previous finals appearances (bold indicates winners)
Inter Milan	2023–24 Serie A champions	12 (**1989**, 2000, **2005**, **2006**, 2007, **2008**, 2009, **2010**, 2011, **2021**, **2022**, **2023**)
AC Milan	2023–24 Serie A runners-up	12 (**1988**, **1992**, **1993**, **1994**, 1996, 1999, 2003, **2004**, **2011**, **2016**, 2018, 2022)

== Route to the final ==
Inter Milan		Round	AC Milan	
Opponent	Result	2024–25 Supercoppa Italiana	Opponent	Result
Atalanta	2–0	Semi-finals	Juventus	2–1

== Match ==
=== Details ===
6 January 2025
22:00 AST

Inter Milan	2–3	AC Milan
L. Martínez 45+1'; Taremi 47'	Report	Hernandez 52'; Pulisic 80'; Abraham 90+3'

King Saud University Stadium, Riyadh
Attendance: 24,841
Referee: Simone Sozza

**Inter Milan**	**AC Milan**

GK	1	(Switzerland) Yann Sommer
CB	31	(Germany) Yann Aurel Bisseck
CB	6	(Netherlands) Stefan de Vrij		(substituted off) 84'
CB	95	(Italy) Alessandro Bastoni	(yellow card) 89'
DM	20	(Turkey) Hakan Çalhanoğlu		(substituted off) 35'
CM	23	(Italy) Nicolò Barella	(yellow card) 72'	(substituted off) 84'
CM	22	(Armenia) Henrikh Mkhitaryan	(yellow card) 51'	(substituted off) 65'
RM	2	(Netherlands) Denzel Dumfries	(yellow card) 54'
LM	32	(Italy) Federico Dimarco		(substituted off) 66'
CF	99	(Iran) Mehdi Taremi
CF	10	(Argentina) Lautaro Martínez (c)
Substitutes:
GK	13	(Spain) Josep Martínez
GK	40	(Italy) Alessandro Calligaris
DF	30	(Brazil) Carlos Augusto		(substituted on) 66'
DF	36	(Italy) Matteo Darmian		(substituted on) 84'
DF	42	(Argentina) Tomás Palacios
DF	50	(Italy) Mike Aidoo
DF	51	(Greece) Christos Alexiou
MF	7	(Poland) Piotr Zieliński		(substituted on) 65'
MF	16	(Italy) Davide Frattesi		(substituted on) 84'
MF	17	(Canada) Tajon Buchanan
MF	21	(Albania) Kristjan Asllani		(substituted on) 35'
MF	52	(Italy) Thomas Berenbruch
FW	8	(Austria) Marko Arnautović
FW	9	(France) Marcus Thuram
FW	11	(Argentina) Joaquín Correa
Manager:
(Italy) Simone Inzaghi

GK	16	(France) Mike Maignan (c)
RB	22	(Brazil) Emerson Royal		(substituted off) 87'
CB	23	(England) Fikayo Tomori	(yellow card) 57'
CB	28	(Germany) Malick Thiaw
LB	19	(France) Théo Hernandez
CM	80	(United States) Yunus Musah		(substituted off) 77'
CM	29	(France) Youssouf Fofana
CM	14	(Netherlands) Tijjani Reijnders		(substituted off) 77'
RF	20	(Spain) Álex Jiménez		(substituted off) 50'
CF	7	(Spain) Álvaro Morata
LF	11	(United States) Christian Pulisic
Substitutes:
GK	57	(Italy) Marco Sportiello
DF	2	(Italy) Davide Calabria		(substituted on) 87'
DF	31	(Serbia) Strahinja Pavlović
DF	33	(Italy) Davide Bartesaghi
DF	46	(Italy) Matteo Gabbia
MF	4	(Algeria) Ismaël Bennacer
MF	8	(England) Ruben Loftus-Cheek		(substituted on) 77'
MF	18	(Italy) Kevin Zeroli
MF	42	(Italy) Filippo Terracciano
MF	55	(Netherlands) Silvano Vos
FW	9	(Serbia) Luka Jović
FW	10	(Portugal) Rafael Leão		(substituted on) 50'
FW	70	(Ivory Coast) Chaka Traorè
FW	73	(Italy) Francesco Camarda
FW	90	(England) Tammy Abraham		(substituted on) 77'
Manager:
(Portugal) Sérgio Conceição

Man of the Match:
Tammy Abraham (AC Milan)

Assistant referees:
Ciro Carbone
Alberto Tegoni
Fourth official:
Michael Fabbri
Reserve assistant referee:
Giuseppe Perrotti
Video assistant referee:
Valerio Marini
Assistant video assistant referee:
Daniele Doveri

**Match rules**

- 90 minutes.
- Penalty shoot-out if scores level.
- Maximum of fifteen named substitutes.
- Maximum of five substitutions. (Note: Each team was given only three opportunities to make substitutions, excluding substitutions made at half-time.)

== See also ==
- 2024–25 Serie A
- 2024–25 Coppa Italia
- 2024–25 AC Milan season
- 2024–25 Inter Milan season
