= 2011 Supercoppa Italiana =

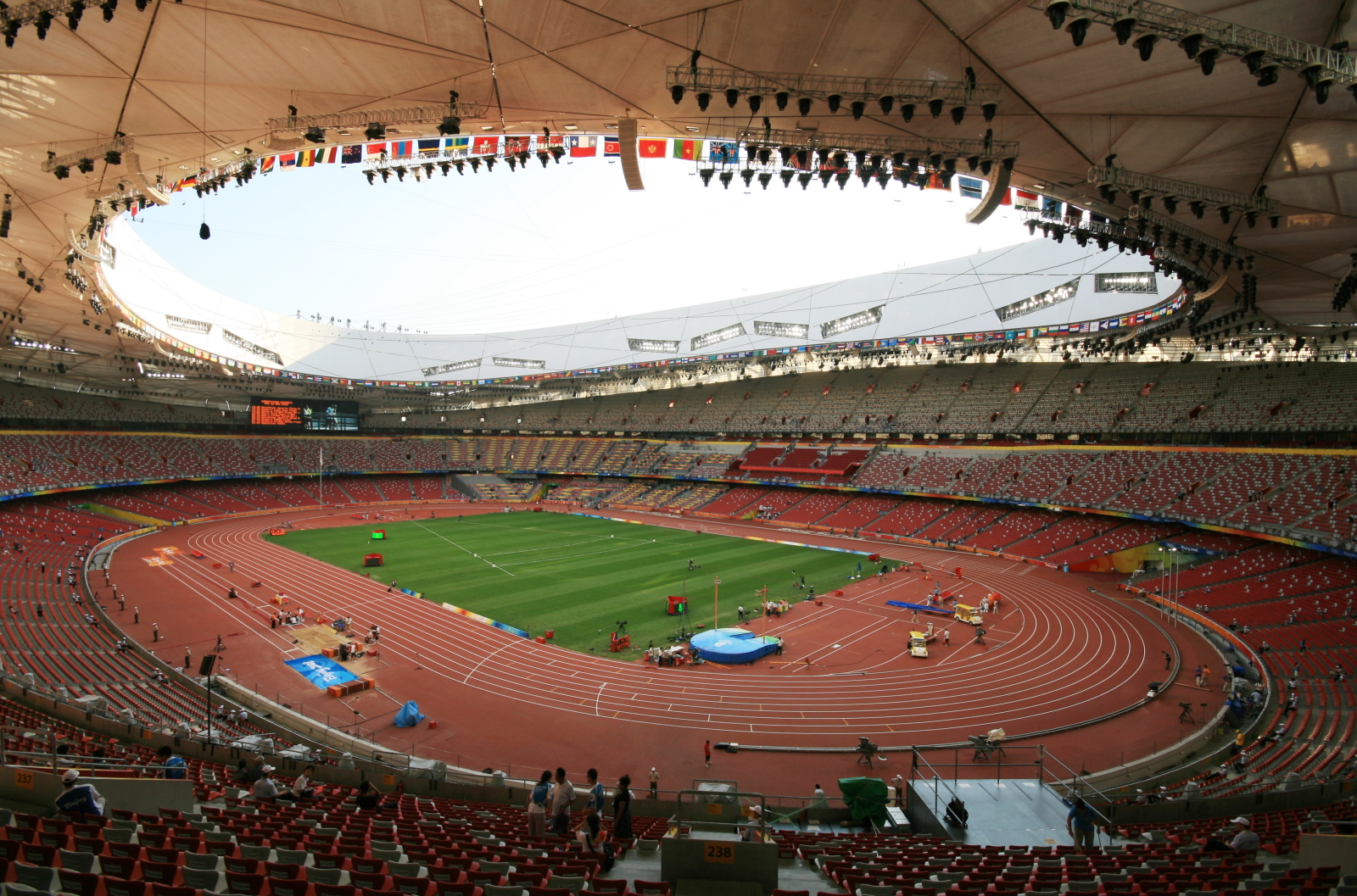
AC Milan	Inter Milan
Serie A	Coppa Italia
2	1
- Date: 6 August 2011
- Venue: Beijing National Stadium, Beijing
- Referee: Nicola Rizzoli
- Attendance: 66,161
- Weather: Cloudy; 23 °C (73 °F)

The 2011 TIM Supercoppa Italiana was the 24th edition of the Supercoppa, an annual football match contested by the winners of the previous season's Serie A and Coppa Italia competitions.

The match, the curtain raiser to the new football season in Italy, was the 208th Derby della Madonnina between AC Milan and defending champions Inter Milan, marking the first time these two sides have met in this competition. The match was played at the National Stadium in Beijing on Saturday 6 August 2011. AC Milan won the title 2–1.

AC Milan qualified to take part by winning the 2010–11 Serie A title while their city rivals Inter Milan qualified by winning the 2011 Coppa Italia final. Inter Milan are the competition's defending champions, having beaten Roma 3–1 in last season's contest. Both teams have appeared in the Supercoppa final eight times during its history, AC Milan winning six times and Inter five.

== Match details ==
6 August 2011
20:00 CST

AC Milan	2–1	Inter Milan
Ibrahimović 60'; Boateng 69'	Report	Sneijder 22'

Beijing National Stadium, Beijing, China
Attendance: 66,161
Referee: Nicola Rizzoli

AC Milan	Inter Milan

GK	32	(Italy) Christian Abbiati
RB	20	(Italy) Ignazio Abate
CB	13	(Italy) Alessandro Nesta
CB	33	(Brazil) Thiago Silva
LB	19	(Italy) Gianluca Zambrotta	(yellow card) 64'
CM	8	(Italy) Gennaro Gattuso (c)	(yellow card) 20'	(substituted off) 75'
CM	4	(Netherlands) Mark van Bommel
CM	10	(Netherlands) Clarence Seedorf
AM	27	(Ghana) Kevin-Prince Boateng	(yellow card) 78'	(substituted off) 82'
ST	70	(Brazil) Robinho		(substituted off) 62'
CF	11	(Sweden) Zlatan Ibrahimović
Substitutes:
GK	1	(Italy) Marco Amelia
DF	25	(Italy) Daniele Bonera
DF	76	(Colombia) Mario Yepes
MF	23	(Italy) Massimo Ambrosini	(yellow card) 86'	(substituted on) 75'
MF	28	(Netherlands) Urby Emanuelson		(substituted on) 82'
FW	7	(Brazil) Alexandre Pato		(substituted on) 62'
FW	99	(Italy) Antonio Cassano
Manager:
Massimiliano Allegri

GK	1	(Brazil) Júlio César
CB	23	(Italy) Andrea Ranocchia
CB	25	(Argentina) Walter Samuel
CB	26	(Romania) Cristian Chivu
RWB	4	(Argentina) Javier Zanetti (c)
LWB	20	(Nigeria) Joel Obi		(substituted off) 82'
DM	8	(Italy) Thiago Motta
CM	5	(Serbia) Dejan Stanković		(substituted off) 74'
CM	11	(Argentina) Ricky Álvarez		(substituted off) 63'
AM	10	(Netherlands) Wesley Sneijder	(yellow card) 61'
CF	9	(Cameroon) Samuel Eto'o
Substitutes:
GK	12	(Italy) Luca Castellazzi
DF	44	(Italy) Matteo Bianchetti
DF	37	(Italy) Davide Faraoni		(substituted on) 63'
MF	77	(Ghana) Sulley Muntari
FW	7	(Italy) Giampaolo Pazzini		(substituted on) 74'
FW	27	(North Macedonia) Goran Pandev
FW	30	(Netherlands) Luc Castaignos		(substituted on) 82'
Manager:
Gian Piero Gasperini

MAN OF THE MATCH

- Zlatan Ibrahimović (Milan)

MATCH OFFICIALS

- Assistant referees: Massimiliano Grilli, Cristiano Copelli
- Fourth official: Paolo Silvio Mazzoleni

MATCH RULES

- 90 minutes (two halves of 45 minutes each).
- 30 minutes of extra-time (two halves of 15 minutes each) if necessary.
- Penalty shoot-out if scores still level.
- Seven named substitutes.
- Maximum of three substitutions.

Supercoppa Italiana
2011 Winners
Milan
Sixth title

== See also ==
- 2010–11 Serie A
- 2010–11 Coppa Italia
- 2010–11 AC Milan season
- 2010–11 Inter Milan season

Played between same clubs:

- 2022 Supercoppa Italiana
- 2025 Supercoppa Italiana final (January)
