= La Croce, Buti =

La Croce
- Frazione
- Location of La Croce in Italy
- Coordinates: 43°43′44″N 10°36′26″E
- Country: Italy
- Region: Tuscany
- Province: Pisa (PI)
- Comune: Buti
- Elevation: 40 m (130 ft)
- Time zone: UTC+1 (CET)
  - Summer (DST): UTC+2 (CEST)
- Postal code: 56032
- Dialing code: (+39) 0587

La Croce is a village in Tuscany, central Italy, administratively a frazione of the comune of Buti, province of Pisa.

La Croce is about 24 km from Pisa and 2 km from Buti.

== Bibliography ==
- Caciagli, Giuseppe (1972). Pisa e la sua provincia. Vol. 2. Pisa: Colombo Cursi Editore.
