= Cascina (disambiguation) =

Cascina is a comune in the Province of Pisa, Italy.

Cascina may also refer to:

- Cascina a corte, a type of rural building traditional of the Po Valley, Italy
- A.S.D. Cascina, an Italian association football club located in Cascina, Italy

== See also ==
- Cascine (disambiguation)
