= Piero Ausilio =

Italian football director (born 1972)

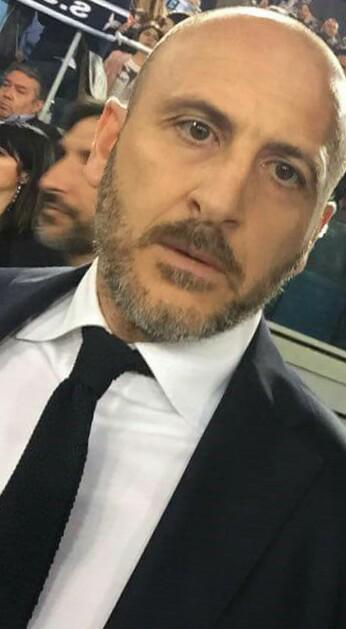
- Piero Ausilio in 2018
- Born: 28 June 1972 (age 54); Milan, Italy
- Education: University of Milan
- Occupation: Football director

Piero Ausilio (born 28 June 1972) is an Italian football executive who is currently serving as sporting director of Inter Milan. He has been associated with the club in various roles since 1998.

== Early life and career ==
Ausilio was born in Milan to parents originally from Campana in the province of Cosenza. He began his football career as a midfielder in the youth system of Pro Sesto but retired at the age of 18 due to a serious knee injury.

In 1997, after working as an assistant coach at Pro Sesto, he became the head of the club’s youth sector alongside Pierluigi Casiraghi. During this time, he also earned a degree in Law from the University of Milan.

In January 1998, Ausilio joined Inter Milan as secretary of the youth academy, following a recommendation by Casiraghi and an invitation from Mario Mereghetti. In 2001, he was appointed organizational director of the youth sector, working alongside technical director Giuseppe Baresi. He later became director of Inter’s youth academy.

Between 2003 and 2005, he served on the board of Spezia Calcio representing Inter, and after gaining official certification, he became the club’s sporting director for the 2004–05 season. Ausilio is also a member of the board of the Italian Sporting Directors’ Association (Adise).

In December 2010, he left the youth sector to become sporting director of Inter, working alongside technical director Marco Branca. On 8 February 2014, he succeeded Branca as technical area manager.

On 11 February 2015, he received the "TMW Award" as best sporting director of the 2014–15 Serie A season. On 4 June, he was also honored with the "Football Leader" award for scouting.

On 21 April 2017, he extended his contract with Inter until 2020. He was later joined by Walter Sabatini (technical coordinator, May 2017–March 2018) and Giuseppe Marotta (CEO of sport area from December 2018).

During the 2020–21 season, Inter won the league title after eleven years. The club followed up with victories in the 2021 Supercoppa Italiana and the Coppa Italia.

In the 2022–23 season, Inter repeated success in the 2022 Supercoppa Italiana and the Coppa Italia, and reached the Champions League final for the first time in thirteen years.

In the 2023–24 season, the club won a third consecutive Supercoppa Italiana and secured its twentieth Serie A title, earning its second Scudetto Star. At the end of 2024, Ausilio was named "Best Sporting Director" at the Globe Soccer Awards.

== Personal life ==
Ausilio was previously married to Daniela, with whom he has two children: Giulia (born 2002) and Niccolò (born 2005).
