= 2024–25 Supercoppa Italiana =

Tournament details
- Host country: Saudi Arabia
- Dates: 2–6 January 2025
- Teams: 4
- Venue: 1 (in 1 host city)

Final positions
- Champions: AC Milan (8th title)
- Runners-up: Inter

Tournament statistics
- Matches played: 3
- Goals scored: 10 (3.33 per match)
- Attendance: 66,520 (22,173 per match)
- Top scorer(s): Denzel Dumfries; Christian Pulisic (2 goals each)

The 2024–25 Supercoppa Italiana (branded as the EA SPORTS FC Supercup for sponsorship reasons) was the 37th edition of the Supercoppa Italiana.

2023–24 Serie A runners-up AC Milan defeated 2023–24 Serie A winners Inter Milan 3–2 in the final, securing an eighth Supercoppa Italiana title.

== Qualification ==
The tournament featured the winners and runners-up of the 2023–24 Serie A and 2023–24 Coppa Italia.

=== Qualified teams ===
The following four teams qualified for the tournament. Atalanta qualified for the first time in their history.

Team	Method of qualification	Appearance	Last appearance as	Years performance		
Team	Method of qualification	Appearance	Last appearance as	Winner(s)	Runners-up	Semi-finalists
Inter Milan	2023–24 Serie A champions	13th	2023 winners	8	4	1
Juventus	2023–24 Coppa Italia winners	18th	2021 runners-up	9	8	–
AC Milan	2023–24 Serie A runners-up	13th	2022 runners-up	7	5	–
Atalanta	2023–24 Coppa Italia runners-up	1st	–	–	–	–

== Format ==
The competition featured two semi-finals to determine the two teams that played in the final. All three matches were played in a single-leg fixture. Matches consisted of two periods of 45 minutes each. In the case of a draw, the matches would be decided by a penalty shoot-out.

== Venue ==
The matches were played at the King Saud University Stadium in Riyadh, Saudi Arabia, marking the fifth time that the Supercoppa Italiana had been held in the Middle Eastern country.

Location of the host city of the 2024–25 Supercoppa Italiana.	City	Stadium
Location of the host city of the 2024–25 Supercoppa Italiana.	Riyadh	King Saud University Stadium
Location of the host city of the 2024–25 Supercoppa Italiana.	Capacity: 25,000	

== Matches ==
- Times listed are SAST (UTC+3).

=== Bracket ===
Semi-finals
2 January 2025 – Riyadh
Inter Milan	2
Atalanta	0
3 January 2025 – Riyadh
Juventus	1
AC Milan	2

Final
6 January 2025 – Riyadh
Inter Milan	2
AC Milan	3

=== Semi-finals ===
2 January 2025
22:00

Inter Milan	2–0	Atalanta
Dumfries 49', 61'	Report

King Saud University Stadium, Riyadh
Attendance: 16,896
Referee: Daniele Chiffi

3 January 2025
22:00

Juventus	1–2	AC Milan
Yıldız 21'	Report	Pulisic 71' (pen.); Gatti 75' (o.g.)

King Saud University Stadium, Riyadh
Attendance: 24,783
Referee: Andrea Colombo

=== Final ===
6 January 2025
22:00

Inter Milan	2–3	AC Milan
L. Martínez 45+1'; Taremi 47'	Report	Hernandez 52'; Pulisic 80'; Abraham 90+3'

King Saud University Stadium, Riyadh
Attendance: 24,841
Referee: Simone Sozza
