= Cascine di Buti =

- Frazione
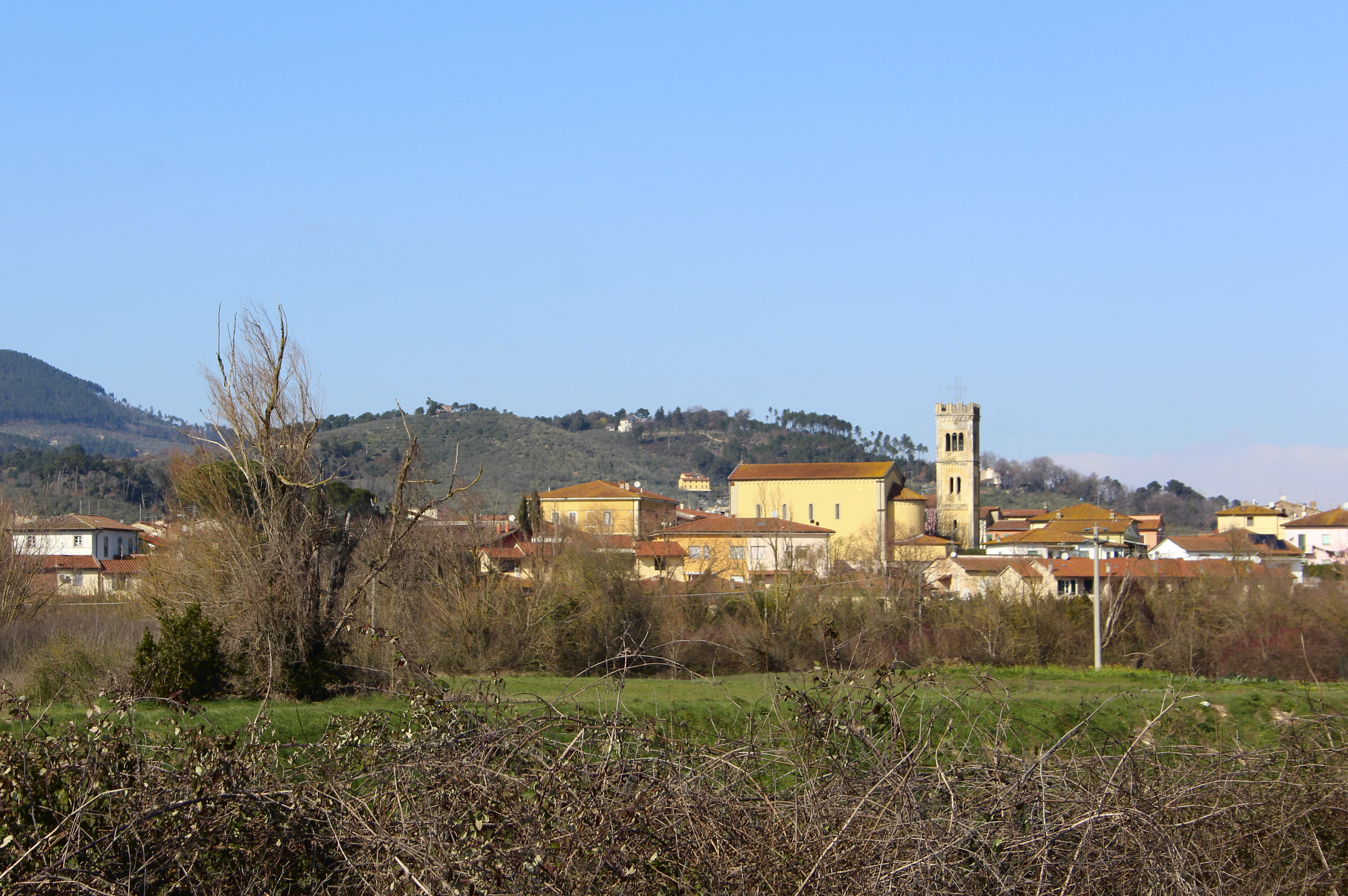

- Location of Cascine di Buti in Italy
- Coordinates: 43°43′36″N 10°37′8″E
- Country: Italy
- Region: Tuscany
- Province: Pisa (PI)
- Comune: Buti
- Elevation: 21 m (69 ft)

Population (2011)
  - Total: 3,304
- Time zone: UTC+1 (CET)
  - Summer (DST): UTC+2 (CEST)
- Postal code: 56032
- Dialing code: (+39) 0587

Cascine di Buti is a village in Tuscany, central Italy, administratively a frazione of the comune of Buti, province of Pisa. At the time of the 2001 census its population was 2,999.

Cascine di Buti is about 25 km (16 mi) from Pisa and 3 km (1.9 mi) from Buti.
