= Buti (given name) =

Buti is a South African masculine given name. Notable people with the name include:

- Buti Khoza (born 1988), South African football goalkeeper
- Buti Manamela (born 1979), South African public servant
