= Buti-ye Bala =

Buti-ye Bala بوتي بالا
- Village
- Location within Iran
- Coordinates: 25°36′34″N 61°10′40″E
- Country: Iran
- Province: Sistan and Baluchestan
- County: Chabahar
- Bakhsh: Polan
- Rural District: Polan

Population (2006)
  - Total: 973
- Time zone: UTC+3:30 (IRST)
  - Summer (DST): UTC+4:30 (IRDT)

Buti-ye Bala (Persian: بوتي بالا, also Romanized as Būtī-ye Bālā; also known as Būtī) is a village in Polan Rural District, Polan District, Chabahar County, Sistan and Baluchestan Province, Iran. At the 2006 census, its population was 973, in 190 families.
