= Buti-ye Pain =

Buti-ye Pain بوتي پايين
- Village
- Location within Iran
- Coordinates: 25°36′12″N 61°11′25″E
- Country: Iran
- Province: Sistan and Baluchestan
- County: Chabahar
- Bakhsh: Polan
- Rural District: Polan

Population (2006)
  - Total: 167
- Time zone: UTC+3:30 (IRST)
  - Summer (DST): UTC+4:30 (IRDT)

Buti-ye Pain (Persian: بوتي پايين, also Romanized as Būtī-ye Pā’īn; also known as Būtī-ye Nūr Moḩammad) is a village in Polan Rural District, Polan District, Chabahar County, Sistan and Baluchestan Province, Iran. At the 2006 census, its population was 167, in 32 families.
