= Supercoppa Italiana =

Italian football competition

- Organiser(s): Lega Serie A
- Founded: 1988; 38 years ago
- Region: Italy
- Teams: 2
- Current champions: Napoli (3rd title)
- Most championships: Juventus (9 titles)
- Broadcaster: Mediaset
- Website: legaseriea.it
- 2026–27 Supercoppa Italiana

The Supercoppa Italiana, also known as the Italian Super Cup, is an annual super cup tournament in Italian football. Founded in 1988 as a two-team competition, the match is contested between the winners of the Serie A and Coppa Italia titles. If the same team wins both the Serie A and Coppa Italia titles in the previous season, the Supercoppa is contested by the Serie A winner and the Coppa Italia runner-up, in essence becoming a rematch of the previous year's Coppa Italia final. Between 2023 and 2025–26, it briefly featured four teams (the winners and runners-up of the previous season's Serie A and Coppa Italia), before the format reverted to a two-team competition.

It was originally the opening match of the new season, played at the home stadium of the previous season's Serie A champions. Since 2018, the competition has been held during the winter months, and is mainly hosted internationally. Juventus is the most successful club with nine titles. They have met Lazio on five occasions, making it the most frequent matchup in tournament history.

== History ==
When the tournament first began, it was primarily held in Italy. It went abroad for the first time in 1993, when Washington, D.C. hosted a match between AC Milan and Torino. There would not be another international contest until 2002, when the Supercoppa was held in Tripoli. The following year, East Rutherford, a suburb of New York City, hosted the tournament. The next five contests would be held in Italy, and in 2009, a new era of international travel would begin for the Supercoppa. Beijing hosted a match between Lazio and Inter Milan that year, while China would go on to host three more tournaments by 2015. Qatar hosted the tournament twice in this time as well, in 2014 and 2016.

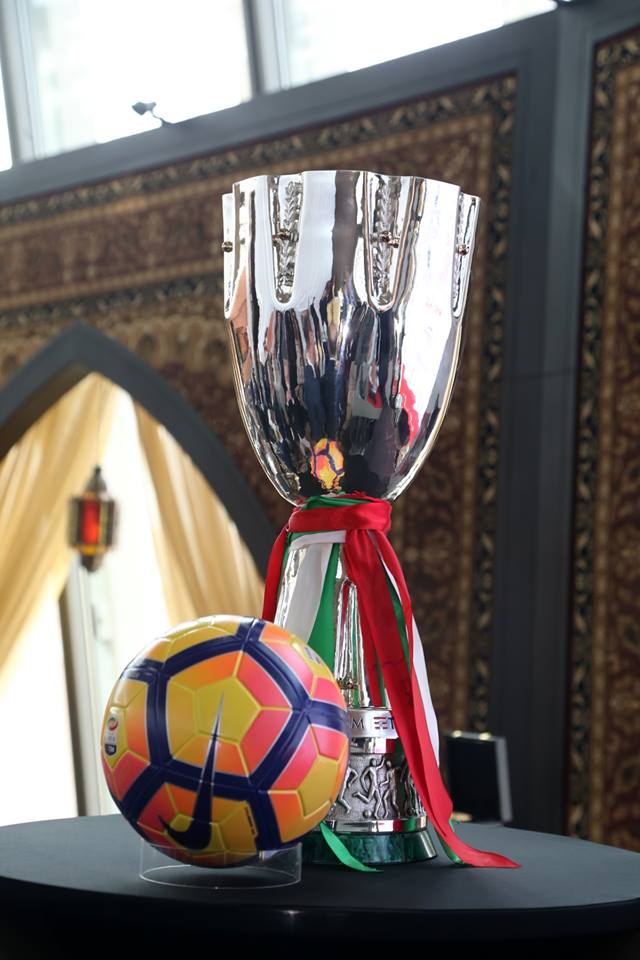
The Supercoppa Italiana trophy on display in Doha, Qatar.

In 2018, the Lega Serie A and the General Sports Authority signed an agreement that would see Saudi Arabia host three of the next five tournaments. This decision sparked controversy, as Italians were concerned about women in Saudi Arabia being unable to attend the match unless they were within the stadium's family sections and were accompanied by men. Then-Serie A president Gaetano Miccichè told those concerned that these sections were a sign of progress, saying "The Supercoppa will go down in history as the first official international football competition which Saudi women were permitted to watch live." The cup did return to Italy in 2020 for two years, but only due to the COVID-19 pandemic. It has since gone back to Saudi Arabia, where it is set to remain until 2029 under a new six-year agreement.

== Notable occurrences ==
The Serie A title and Coppa Italia have been won by the same team eight times since the Supercoppa was introduced. As a result, Coppa Italia runners-up instead competed in the subsequent Supercoppa, per Lega Serie A rules. This occurred five times with Juventus (1995, 2015, 2016, 2017 and 2018), twice with Inter Milan (2006 and 2010), and once with Lazio (2000). Since 2023, Serie A and Coppa Italia runners-up automatically qualify for the tournament.

The only Supercoppa to ever be held without spectators was on 20 January 2021, at the Mapei Stadium – Città del Tricolore.

AC Milan became the first Coppa Italia runners-up to win the Supercoppa Italiana after defeating Juventus on penalties in 2016. They later made history again in 2025, becoming the first Serie A runners-up to win the competition by defeating Inter Milan, in just the second year of the tournament's new four-team format.

== List of matches ==
Key
Supercoppa winners
All-time attendance record

=== Two-team format ===
List of Supercoppa Italiana matches
Year	Serie A winners	Result	Coppa representatives	Stadium	Attendance
1988	AC Milan	3–1	Sampdoria	San Siro, Milan	19,412
1989	Inter Milan	2–0	Sampdoria	San Siro, Milan	7,221
1990	Napoli	5–1	Juventus	Stadio San Paolo, Naples	62,404
1991	Sampdoria	1–0	Roma	Stadio Luigi Ferraris, Genoa	21,120
1992	AC Milan	2–1	Parma	San Siro, Milan	30,102
1993	AC Milan	1–0	Torino	Robert F. Kennedy Memorial Stadium, Washington, D.C., United States	25,268
1994	AC Milan	1–1 (4–3 p)	Sampdoria	San Siro, Milan	26,767
1995	Juventus	1–0	Parma (Note: Qualified as Coppa Italia runners-up.)	Stadio delle Alpi, Turin	5,289
1996	AC Milan	1–2	Fiorentina	San Siro, Milan	29,582
1997	Juventus	3–0	Vicenza	Stadio delle Alpi, Turin	16,157
1998	Juventus	1–2	Lazio	Stadio delle Alpi, Turin	16,500
1999	AC Milan	1–2	Parma	San Siro, Milan	25,001
2000	Lazio	4–3	Inter Milan	Stadio Olimpico, Rome	61,446
2001	Roma	3–0	Fiorentina	Stadio Olimpico, Rome	61,050
2002	Juventus	2–1	Parma	11 June Stadium, Tripoli, Libya	40,000
2003	Juventus	1–1 (a.e.t.) (5–3 p)	AC Milan	Giants Stadium, East Rutherford, New Jersey, United States	54,128
2004	AC Milan	3–0	Lazio	San Siro, Milan	33,274
2005	Juventus (Note: Juventus was subsequently stripped of the Serie A title due to the Calciopoli scandal.)	0–1 (a.e.t.)	Inter Milan	Stadio delle Alpi, Turin	35,246
2006	Inter Milan	4–3 (a.e.t.)	Roma	San Siro, Milan	45,528
2007	Inter Milan	0–1	Roma	San Siro, Milan	34,898
2008	Inter Milan	2–2 (a.e.t.) (6–5 p)	Roma	San Siro, Milan	43,400
2009	Inter Milan	1–2	Lazio	Beijing National Stadium, Beijing, China	68,961
2010	Inter Milan	3–1	Roma	San Siro, Milan	65,860
2011	AC Milan	2–1	Inter Milan	Beijing National Stadium, Beijing, China	66,161
2012	Juventus	4–2 (a.e.t.)	Napoli	Beijing National Stadium, Beijing, China	75,000
2013	Juventus	4–0	Lazio	Stadio Olimpico, Rome	57,000
2014	Juventus	2–2 (a.e.t.) (5–6 p)	Napoli	Jassim bin Hamad Stadium, Doha, Qatar	14,000
2015	Juventus	2–0	Lazio	Shanghai Stadium, Shanghai, China	20,000
2016	Juventus	1–1 (a.e.t.) (3–4 p)	AC Milan	Jassim bin Hamad Stadium, Doha, Qatar	11,356
2017	Juventus	2–3	Lazio	Stadio Olimpico, Rome	52,000
2018	Juventus	1–0	AC Milan	King Abdullah Sports City, Jeddah, Saudi Arabia	61,235
2019	Juventus	1–3	Lazio	King Saud University Stadium, Riyadh, Saudi Arabia	23,361
2020	Juventus	2–0	Napoli	Mapei Stadium – Città del Tricolore, Reggio Emilia	0 (Note: The match was played behind closed doors due to the COVID-19 pandemic in Italy.)
2021	Inter Milan	2–1 (a.e.t.)	Juventus	San Siro, Milan	29,696 (Note: The total attendance available was established at 50% due to the COVID-19 pandemic in Italy.)
2022	AC Milan	0–3	Inter Milan	King Fahd International Stadium, Riyadh, Saudi Arabia	51,357
2026–27	Inter Milan		Lazio	San Siro, Milan	

=== Four-team format ===
List of Supercoppa Italiana finals
Year	Winners	Result	Runners-up	Semi-finalists	Stadium	Attendance (Note: Final match attendance only.)
2023	Inter Milan	1–0	Napoli	Fiorentina and Lazio	King Saud University Stadium, Riyadh, Saudi Arabia	24,900
2024–25	AC Milan	3–2	Inter Milan	Atalanta and Juventus	King Saud University Stadium, Riyadh, Saudi Arabia	24,841
2025–26	Napoli	2–0	Bologna	AC Milan and Inter Milan	King Saud University Stadium, Riyadh, Saudi Arabia	17,869

== Performance by club ==
Club	Winners	Runners-up	Semi-finalists	Years won	Years runner-up	Years semi-finalist
Juventus	9	8	1	1995, 1997, 2002, 2003, 2012, 2013, 2015, 2018, 2020	1990, 1998, 2005, 2014, 2016, 2017, 2019, 2021	2024–25
AC Milan	8	5	1	1988, 1992, 1993, 1994, 2004, 2011, 2016, 2024–25	1996, 1999, 2003, 2018, 2022	2025–26
Inter Milan	8	5	1	1989, 2005, 2006, 2008, 2010, 2021, 2022, 2023	2000, 2007, 2009, 2011, 2024–25	2025–26
Lazio	5	3	1	1998, 2000, 2009, 2017, 2019	2004, 2013, 2015	2023
Napoli	3	3	—	1990, 2014, 2025–26	2012, 2020, 2023	—
Roma	2	4	—	2001, 2007	1991, 2006, 2008, 2010	—
Sampdoria	1	3	—	1991	1988, 1989, 1994	—
Parma	1	3	—	1999	1992, 1995, 2002	—
Fiorentina	1	1	1	1996	2001	2023
Torino	0	1	—	—	1993	—
Vicenza	0	1	—	—	1997	—
Bologna	0	1	—	—	2025–26	—
Atalanta	0	0	1	—	—	2024–25

== Performance by representative ==
Method of qualification	Winners	Runners-up	Semi-finalists
Serie A winners	25	13	0
Coppa Italia winners	10	19	1
Coppa Italia runners-up	2	6	3
Serie A runners-up	1	0	2

== All-time top goalscorers ==
As of 22 December 2025

Rank	Player	Club	Goals	Apps
1	(Argentina) Paulo Dybala	Juventus	4	6
1	(Argentina) Lautaro Martínez	Inter Milan	4	6
3	(Italy) Alessandro Del Piero	Juventus	3	6
3	(Cameroon) Samuel Eto'o	Inter Milan	3	3
3	(Ukraine) Andriy Shevchenko	AC Milan	3	3
3	(Brazil) David Neres	Napoli	3	2
3	(Argentina) Carlos Tevez	Juventus	3	2
