= Buti, Tuscany =

Buti
- Comune
- Comune di Buti
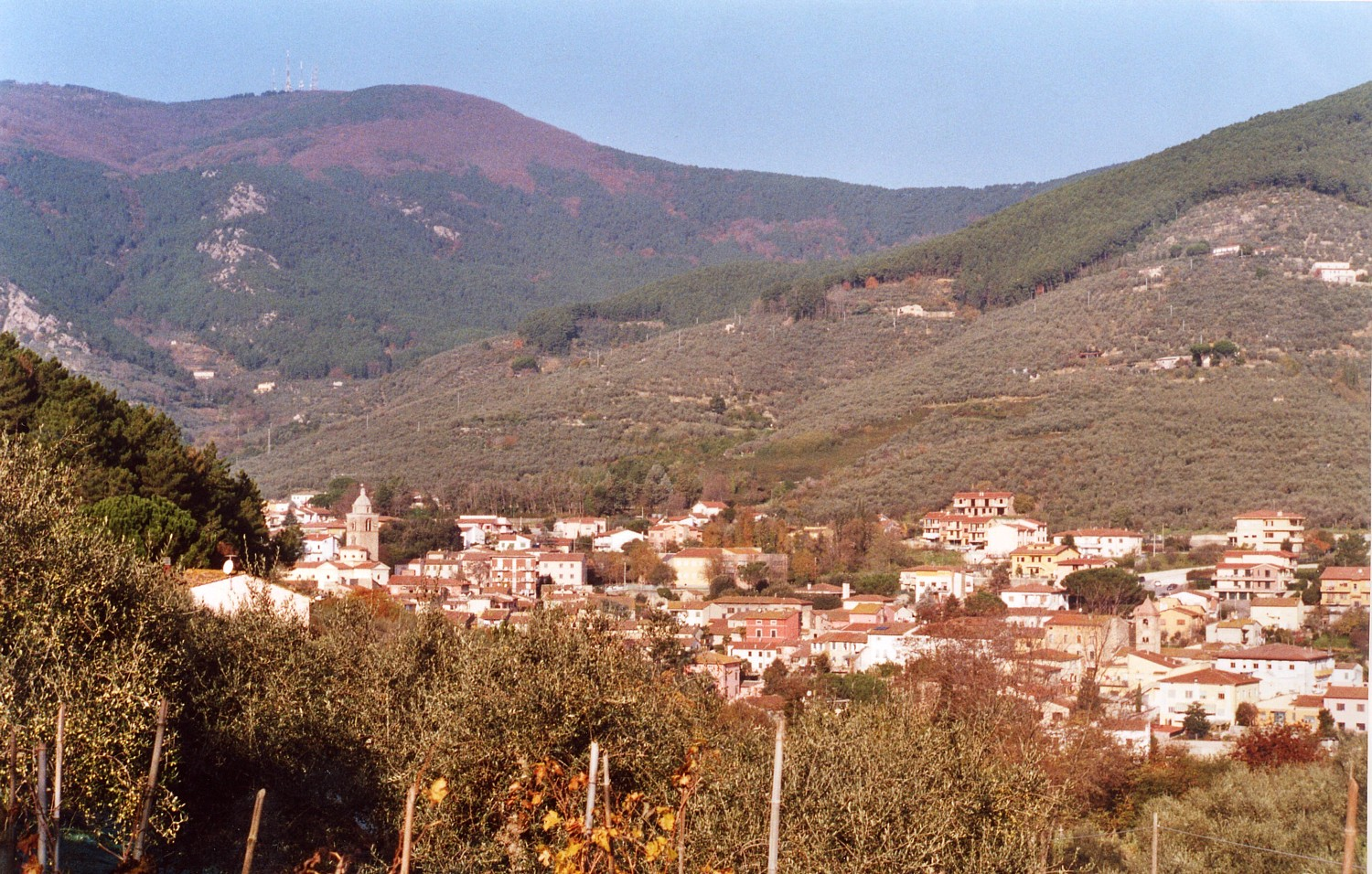

- Coat of arms

- Location within Italy Location within Tuscany
- Coordinates: 43°44′N 10°36′E
- Country: Italy
- Region: Tuscany
- Province: Pisa (PI)
- Frazioni: Cascine di Buti, La Croce

Government
  - Mayor: Arianna Buti

Area
  - Total: 23.03 km^{2} (8.89 sq mi)
- Elevation: 85 m (279 ft)

Population (30 April 2017)
  - Total: 5,670
  - Density: 246/km^{2} (638/sq mi)
- Demonym: Butesi
- Time zone: UTC+1 (CET)
  - Summer (DST): UTC+2 (CEST)
- Postal code: 56032
- Dialing code: 0587
- Saint day: September 11
- Website: Official website

Buti is a comune (municipality) in the Province of Pisa in the Italian region Tuscany, located about 50 kilometres (31 mi) west of Florence and about 15 kilometres (9 mi) east of Pisa. As of 31 December 2004, it had a population of 5,566 and an area of 23.1 square kilometres (8.9 mi^{2}).

== Geography ==
Buti borders the following municipalities: Bientina, Calci, Capannori, Vicopisano.

== Government ==
=== Frazioni ===
The municipality is formed by the municipal seat of Buti and the villages (frazioni) of Cascine di Buti and La Croce.

=== 2021 municipal election ===
The 2021 municipal election attracted press coverage ("Election in Buti – the candidates are named Buti and Buti" in il Fatto Quotidiano) when Arianna Buti defeated Monia Buti in the election for mayor.

== Main sights ==
- Tonini Castle
- Medici Villa
- Hamlet of Castel di Nocco
- Church of St Francis
- Church of San Giovanni Battista
