= 2022 Supercoppa Italiana =

- Event: Supercoppa Italiana
AC Milan	Inter Milan
Serie A	Coppa Italia
0	3
- Date: 18 January 2023
- Venue: King Fahd International Stadium, Riyadh, Saudi Arabia
- Man of the Match: Edin Džeko (Inter Milan)
- Referee: Fabio Maresca
- Attendance: 51,357

The 2022 Supercoppa Italiana (branded as the EA Sports Supercup for sponsorship reasons) was the 35th edition of the Supercoppa Italiana. It was a Derby della Madonnina meeting between AC Milan, winners of the 2021–22 Serie A championship, and Inter Milan, winners of the 2021–22 Coppa Italia. It took place at the King Fahd International Stadium in Riyadh, Saudi Arabia.

Inter Milan won the match 3–0 for their second consecutive and seventh overall Supercoppa Italiana title.

== Background ==
This was the second time AC Milan and Inter Milan had met in the Supercoppa Italiana, with AC Milan winning the 2011 edition 2–1 in Beijing, China. It ended Juventus' streak of ten consecutive appearances which started the following year. AC Milan entered the game having won seven of eleven Supercoppa games, and first since losing to Juventus in 2018. Inter Milan made its second successive appearance, having beaten Juventus the previous year, and entered the game having won six of ten.

== Venue ==
Location of the host city of the 2022 Supercoppa Italiana.	City	Stadium
Location of the host city of the 2022 Supercoppa Italiana.	Riyadh	King Fahd International Stadium
Location of the host city of the 2022 Supercoppa Italiana.	Capacity: 58,398	

== Match ==
=== Details ===
18 January 2023
22:00 AST

AC Milan	0–3	Inter Milan
	Report	Dimarco 10'; Džeko 21'; Martínez 77'

King Fahd International Stadium, Riyadh (Saudi Arabia)
Attendance: 51,357
Referee: Fabio Maresca

AC Milan	Inter Milan

GK	1	(Romania) Ciprian Tătărușanu
RB	2	(Italy) Davide Calabria (c)		(substituted off) 80'
CB	24	(Denmark) Simon Kjær		(substituted off) 65'
CB	23	(England) Fikayo Tomori
LB	19	(France) Théo Hernandez	(yellow card) 77'
CM	8	(Italy) Sandro Tonali	(yellow card) 85'
CM	4	(Algeria) Ismaël Bennacer
RW	30	(Brazil) Junior Messias		(substituted off) 65'
AM	10	(Spain) Brahim Díaz		(substituted off) 65'
LW	17	(Portugal) Rafael Leão
CF	9	(France) Olivier Giroud		(substituted off) 81'
Substitutes:
GK	77	(Colombia) Devis Vásquez
GK	83	(Italy) Antonio Mirante
DF	20	(France) Pierre Kalulu		(substituted on) 65'
DF	21	(United States) Sergiño Dest		(substituted on) 80'
DF	28	(Germany) Malick Thiaw
DF	46	(Italy) Matteo Gabbia
DF	94	(Italy) Andrea Bozzolan
MF	7	(France) Yacine Adli
MF	14	(France) Tiémoué Bakayoko
MF	32	(Italy) Tommaso Pobega
MF	40	(Belgium) Aster Vranckx
MF	90	(Belgium) Charles De Ketelaere		(substituted on) 65'
FW	12	(Croatia) Ante Rebić		(substituted on) 81'
FW	27	(Belgium) Divock Origi		(substituted on) 65'
FW	56	(Belgium) Alexis Saelemaekers
Manager:
(Italy) Stefano Pioli

GK	24	(Cameroon) André Onana
CB	37	(Slovakia) Milan Škriniar (c)
CB	15	(Italy) Francesco Acerbi
CB	95	(Italy) Alessandro Bastoni		(substituted off) 85'
DM	20	(Turkey) Hakan Çalhanoğlu	(yellow card) 72'	(substituted off) 84'
CM	23	(Italy) Nicolò Barella	(yellow card) 33'	(substituted off) 71'
CM	22	(Armenia) Henrikh Mkhitaryan
RW	36	(Italy) Matteo Darmian
LW	32	(Italy) Federico Dimarco		(substituted off) 63'
CF	9	(Bosnia and Herzegovina) Edin Džeko		(substituted off) 71'
CF	10	(Argentina) Lautaro Martínez	(yellow card) 79'
Substitutes:
GK	1	(Slovenia) Samir Handanović
GK	21	(Italy) Alex Cordaz
GK	31	(Brazil) Gabriel Brazão
DF	2	(Netherlands) Denzel Dumfries
DF	6	(Netherlands) Stefan de Vrij		(substituted on) 85'
DF	8	(Germany) Robin Gosens		(substituted on) 63'
DF	12	(Italy) Raoul Bellanova
DF	33	(Italy) Danilo D'Ambrosio
DF	46	(Italy) Mattia Zanotti
MF	5	(Italy) Roberto Gagliardini		(substituted on) 71'
MF	14	(Albania) Kristjan Asllani		(substituted on) 84'
MF	45	(Argentina) Valentín Carboni
MF	77	(Croatia) Marcelo Brozović
FW	11	(Argentina) Joaquín Correa		(substituted on) 71'
FW	90	(Belgium) Romelu Lukaku
Manager:
(Italy) Simone Inzaghi

Man of the Match:
Edin Džeko (Inter Milan)

Assistant referees:
Stefano Alassio
Giovanni Baccini
Fourth official:
Daniele Chiffi
Reserve assistant referee:
Alessandro Lo Cicero
Video assistant referee:
Aleandro Di Paolo
Assistant video assistant referee:
Rosario Abisso

Match rules

- 90 minutes.
- 30 minutes of extra time if necessary.
- Penalty shoot-out if scores still level.
- Maximum of fifteen named substitutes.
- Maximum of five substitutions, with a sixth allowed in extra time. (Note: Each team was given only three opportunities to make substitutions, excluding substitutions made at half-time, before the start of extra time and at half-time in extra time.)

== See also ==
- 2022–23 Serie A
- 2022–23 Coppa Italia
- 2022–23 AC Milan season
- 2022–23 Inter Milan season
