= Adrian Owen =

British neuroscientist and author

Adrian Owen OBE FRS
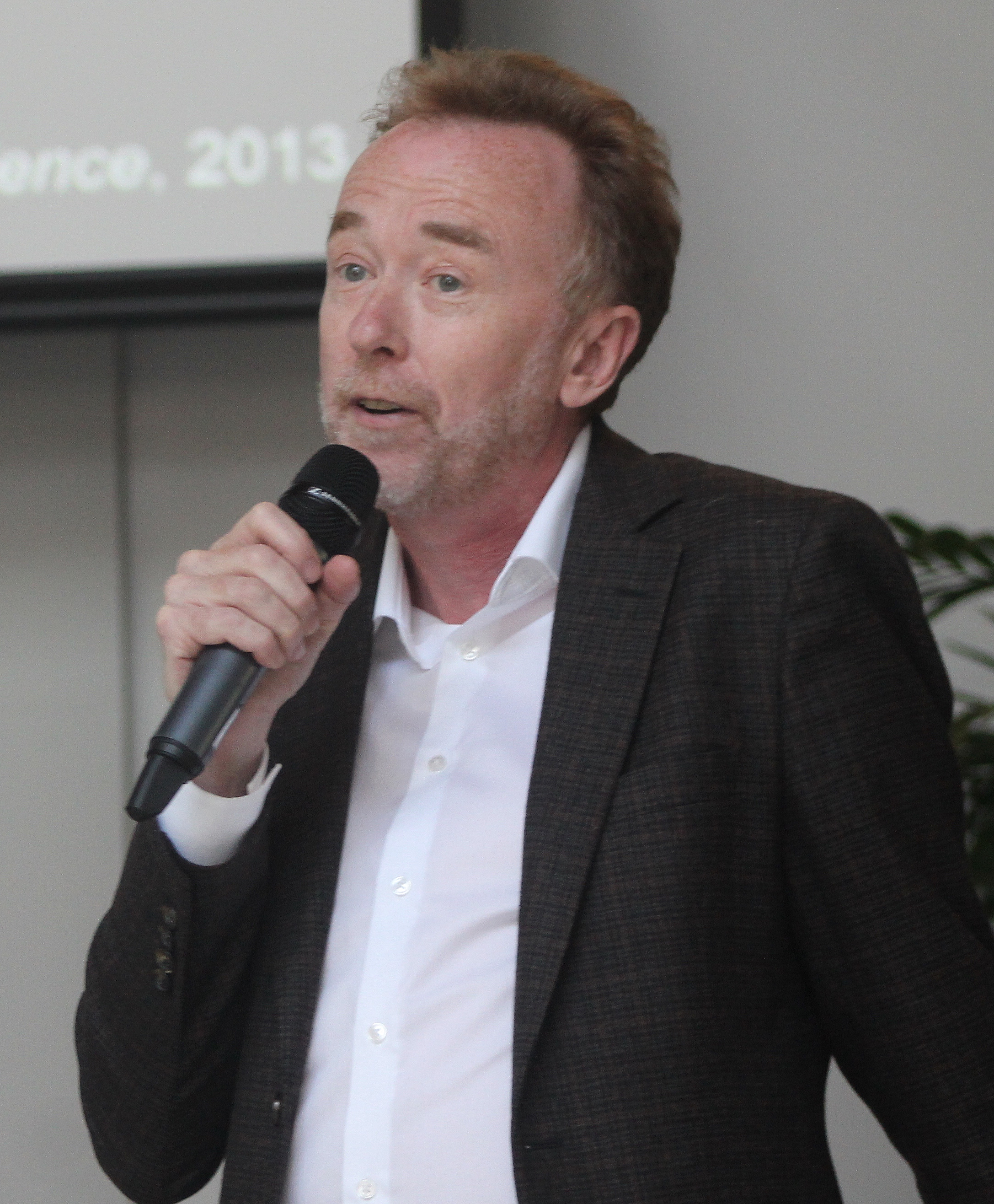
- Adrian Owen lecturing in 2016
- Born: Adrian Mark Owen; 17 May 1966 (age 60); Gravesend, Kent, U.K.
- Citizenship: United Kingdom, Canada
- Education: Gravesend Grammar School
- Alma mater: University College London (BSc); Institute of Psychiatry (PhD)
- Scientific career
- Fields: Consciousness; Vegetative state; Cognition; Brain imaging; Neuropsychology
- Workplaces: University of Cambridge; MRC Cognition and Brain Sciences Unit; University of Western Ontario
- Website: owenlab.uwo.ca

Adrian Mark Owen (born 17 May 1966) is a British and Canadian neuroscientist and best-selling author. He is best known for his 2006 discovery, published in the journal Science showing that some patients thought to be in a vegetative state are in fact fully aware and (shown subsequently) able to communicate with the outside world using functional magnetic resonance imaging (fMRI). In the 2019 New Year Honours List, Owen was made an Officer of the Most Excellent Order of the British Empire (OBE) for services to scientific research. Owen was elected a Fellow of the Royal Society in 2024.

== Early life and education ==
Adrian Owen was born 17 May 1966 in Gravesend, Kent, England, and educated at Gravesend Grammar School, graduating in the same final year class as actor Paul Ritter and businessman Alex Beard. His first degree was in Experimental Psychology from University College London 1985–1988. As a student he shared accommodation with psychologist and best-selling author Richard Wiseman. Owen completed his PhD at the Institute of Psychiatry, London (now part of King's College London) between 1988 and 1992.

== Career ==
In 1992, Owen began his postdoctoral research in the Cognitive Neuroscience Unit at the Montreal Neurological Institute, McGill University, working with Michael Petrides and Brenda Milner. He was awarded The Pinsent Darwin Scholarship by the University of Cambridge in 1996 and returned to the UK to work at the newly opened Wolfson Brain Imaging Centre, Cambridge. In 1997 he moved to the Medical Research Council's Cognition and Brain Sciences Unit (CBU), Cambridge (formally the Applied Psychology Unit) to set up the neuroimaging programme there and to pursue his research in cognitive neuroscience. He was awarded MRC tenure in 2000 and made assistant director of the MRC CBU in 2005, with overall responsibility for the onsite imaging facilities (3T Siemens Tim Trio MRI and 306-channel Elekta-Neuromag MEG systems).

In 2010, Owen was awarded a $10M Canada Excellence Research Chair in Cognitive Neuroscience and Imaging at The University of Western Ontario (UWO) and moved most of his research team to Canada in order to take up this position in January 2011.

In October 2019 Owen was the guest for the BBC Radio 4 programme The Life Scientific.

As of 2026 Owen has published more than 430 peer-reviewed scientific papers and over 40 chapters and books. His work has appeared in many of the world's most prestigious scientific and medical journals, including Science, Nature, The Lancet and The New England Journal of Medicine. He has an h-index of 131 according to Google Scholar.

== Scientific Research ==
=== Disorders of Consciousness ===
Owen is credited with discovering 'covert awareness' (sometimes referred to as 'cognitive motor dissociation') by showing for the first time that a behaviourally non-responsive (vegetative state) patient could change her pattern of brain activity 'on command' when was asked to imagine playing a game of tennis in an fMRI scanner.

This landmark discovery has had implications for clinical care, diagnosis, medical ethics and medical/legal decision-making (relating to the prolongation, or otherwise, of life after severe brain injury). In a follow-up paper in 2010 in The New England Journal of Medicine, Owen and his team used a similar method to allow a man believed to be in a vegetative state for more than 5 years to answer 'yes' and 'no' questions with responses that were generated solely by changing his brain activity using fMRI.

This research attracted international attention from the world's media; it was reported in many hundreds of newspapers around the world (including twice on the front page of The New York Times and other quality journals) and has been widely discussed on television (e.g. BBC News, Channel 4 News, ITN News, Sky News, CNN), radio (e.g. BBC World Service) 'Outlook' documentary, NPR Radio (USA), BBC Radio 1, 2, 3 and 4), in print (e.g. full featured articles in The New Yorker The Times, The Sunday Times, The Observer Magazine etc.) and online (including Nature, Science and The Guardian podcasts). To date, the discovery has featured prominently in 6 television documentaries including 60 Minutes (USA), Panorama BBC Special Report (UK), Inside Out (BBC TV series) (UK), and CBC The National (Canada).

In November 2011, Owen led a study that was published in a weekly peer-reviewed medical journal, The Lancet. The Researchers found a method for assessing whether or not some patients who appear to be vegetative, are in fact, conscious and are just not able to respond. This new method is using electroencephalography (EEG), which is not only less expensive than MRI, but is also portable and can be taken right to the patients bedside for testing.

=== Executive Function ===
Owen's early publications on patients with frontal or temporal-lobe excisions pioneered the use of touch screen based computerised cognitive tests in neuropsychology. Over the last 30 years, these tests have gone on to be used in more than 600 published studies of Parkinson's disease, Alzheimer's disease, Huntington's disease, depression, schizophrenia, autism, obsessive-compulsive disorder and ADHD, among others.

His post-doctoral research on working memory with Michael Petrides, (PNAS, Cerebral Cortex, Journal of Cognitive Neuroscience, Brain and others) was instrumental in refuting the then prevailing view of lateral frontal-lobe organisation advanced by Patricia Goldman-Rakic and others, and is still widely cited in that context. His 1996 paper on the organisation of working memory processes within the human frontal lobe continues to be one of the most highly cited articles ever to appear in the scientific journal Cerebral Cortex.

=== Brain Training ===
In April 2010, Owen and his team published the largest ever public test of computer-based brain training in the journal Nature. The study, conducted in conjunction with the BBC, showed that practice on brain training games does not transfer to other mental skills. More than 11,000 adults followed a six-week training regime, completing computer-based tasks on the BBC's website designed to improve reasoning, memory, planning, visuospatial skills and attention. Details of the results were revealed on BBC1 in Can You Train Your Brain?, a Bang Goes the Theory special and published on the same day in Nature.

== Creyos ==
In 2009, Owen launched Cambridge Brain Sciences, a web-based platform for healthcare providers and the wider scientific community to assess cognitive function using scientifically proven tests of memory, attention, reasoning and planning. In 2023, the company changed its name to Creyos. To date, the tests on the site have been taken more than 20 million times and are used by more than 10,000 healthcare providers worldwide.

== Popular Science Books ==
=== Into The Grey Zone (2017) ===
In June 2017, Owen published Into The Gray Zone: A Neuroscientist Explores the Border Between Life and Death a popular science book that told the story of his 20-year quest to show that some patients thought to be in a vegetative state were in fact entirely aware, but incapable of indicating their awareness to the outside world. The book became a best-seller on both sides of the Atlantic and received strong positive reviews from publications including Nature, The Guardian, and The New York Times. The book made The Sunday Times 'Book of The Year', and The Times 'Book of The Week', it was listed on The New Yorker list 'What We're Reading This Summer' and received 4.9 out of 5 stars on Amazon. The book was translated into multiple languages, including Italian, French, Russian, German, Taiwanese, Japanese, Czech and Polish. A movie adaptation of the book is currently in preproduction.

=== Think Before You Think ===
In August 2026, Owen published his second popular science book, Think Before You Think: Understanding and Mastering Executive Function, based on his research of executive function and the frontal lobes over the last 30 years.

== Personal life ==
Owen lives in London, Ontario with his wife, Emily Nichols who is also a Neuroscientist, and has one son, Jackson. His sister, Frances Walsh is a Safeguarding Nurse for the NHS, in Warwickshire, England. His brother is a Physics Professor at University College London.

For the past thirty years, Owen has played guitar and sung in various bands made up of fellow scientists and musicians.
