= Alex Beard =

Alex Beard may refer to:

- Alex Beard (artist) (born 1970), American artist
- Alex Beard (arts manager) (born 1963), chief executive of the Royal Opera House
- Alex Beard (businessman) (born 1967), British billionaire businessman
