= Oluwafikayomi =

Yoruban first name

- Gender: Unisex

Origin
- Language: Yoruba
- Origin: Nigeria
- Meaning: God adds joy to me

Oluwafikayomi is a Yoruba unisex given name from southwestern Nigeria, meaning “God adds joy to me”. The name is derived from the Yoruba elements ''Oluwa'' (“God”), ''fi'' (“to add/place”), ''ayo'' (“joy”), and ''mi'' (“me” or “mine”).

== Notable people ==
- Fikayo Tomori (Oluwafikayomi Oluwadamilola Tomori), English footballer
