= 2022–23 AC Milan season =

Milan
2022–23 season
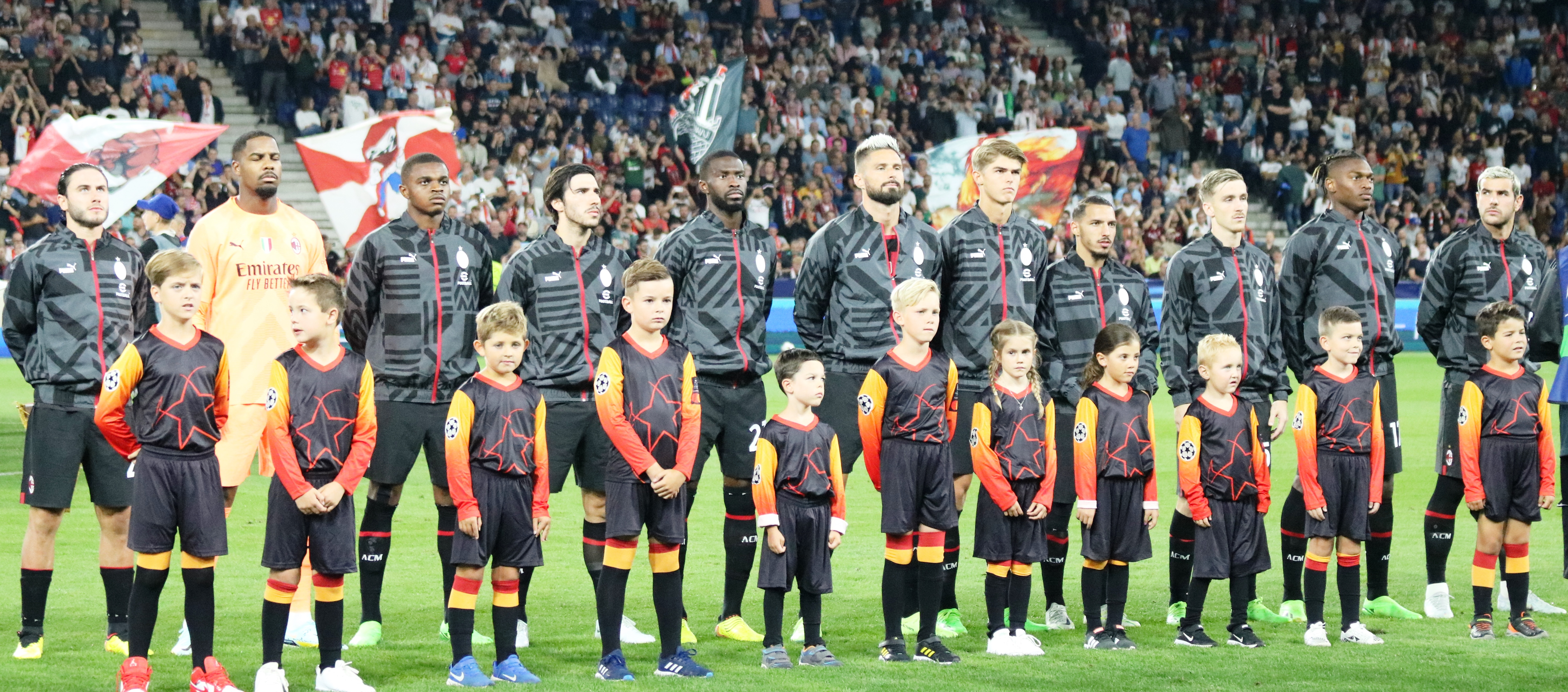
- Milan players line up before facing Salzburg in the Champions League
- Chairman: Paolo Scaroni
- Head coach: Stefano Pioli
- Stadium: San Siro
- Serie A: 4th
- Coppa Italia: Round of 16
- Supercoppa Italiana: Runners-up
- UEFA Champions League: Semi-finals
- Top goalscorer: League: Rafael Leão (15); All: Olivier Giroud (18)
- Highest home attendance: 75,530 vs Juventus, 8 October 2022, Serie A
- Lowest home attendance: 61,341 vs Dinamo Zagreb, 14 September 2022, Champions League
- Average home league attendance: 72,029
- Biggest win: 4–0 vs Red Bull Salzburg; 4–0 vs Dinamo Zagreb; 4–0 vs Napoli; 5–1 vs Sampdoria
- Biggest defeat: 0–4 vs Lazio
| Home colours | Away colours | Third colours |

The 2022–23 season was the 124th season in the existence of AC Milan and the club's 89th season in the top flight of Italian football. In addition to the domestic league, Milan participated in this season's editions of the Coppa Italia, Supercoppa Italiana and UEFA Champions League.

== Players ==
=== Squad information ===
As of 4 June 2023.

| No. | Player | Nat. | Position(s) | Date of birth (age) | Signed in | Contract ends | Signed from | Transfer fee | Notes | Apps | Goals |
Goalkeepers
| 1 | Ciprian Tătăruşanu | (Romania) | GK | 9 February 1986 (aged 37) | 2020 | 2023 | (France) Lyon | €500,000 | | 39 | 0 |
| 16 | Mike Maignan | (France) | GK | 3 July 1995 (aged 27) | 2021 | 2026 | (France) Lille | €13,000,000 | | 69 | 0 |
| 77 | Devis Vásquez | (Colombia) | GK | 12 May 1998 (aged 25) | 2023 | 2026 | (Paraguay) Guaraní | €470,000 | | 0 | 0 |
| 83 | Antonio Mirante | (Italy) | GK | 8 July 1983 (aged 39) | 2021 | 2023 | (Italy) Roma | Free | | 1 | 0 |
Defenders
| 2 | Davide Calabria (captain) | (Italy) | RB | 6 December 1996 (aged 26) | 2015 | 2025 | (Italy) Milan Primavera | Free | From Youth system | 218 | 8 |
| 5 | Fodé Ballo-Touré | (Senegal) | LB | 3 January 1997 (aged 26) | 2021 | 2025 | (France) Monaco | €4,200,000 | | 25 | 1 |
| 19 | Théo Hernandez (vice-captain) | (France) | LB | 6 October 1997 (aged 25) | 2019 | 2026 | (Spain) Real Madrid | €20,000,000 | | 167 | 23 |
| 20 | Pierre Kalulu | (France) | CB / RB | 5 June 2000 (aged 23) | 2020 | 2025 | (France) Lyon II | €480,000 | | 101 | 4 |
| 21 | Sergiño Dest | (United States) | RB | 3 November 2000 (aged 22) | 2022 | 2023 | (Spain) Barcelona | Free | Loan | 14 | 0 |
| 23 | Fikayo Tomori | (England) | CB | 19 December 1997 (aged 25) | 2021 | 2027 | (England) Chelsea | €28,500,000 | | 107 | 3 |
| 24 | Simon Kjær | (Denmark) | CB | 26 March 1989 (aged 34) | 2020 | 2024 | (Spain) Sevilla | €2,500,000 | | 96 | 1 |
| 25 | Alessandro Florenzi | (Italy) | RB | 11 March 1991 (aged 32) | 2021 | 2025 | (Italy) Roma | €3,700,000 | | 35 | 2 |
| 28 | Malick Thiaw | (Germany) | CB | 8 August 2001 (aged 21) | 2022 | 2027 | (Germany) Schalke 04 | €7,000,000 | | 24 | 0 |
| 46 | Matteo Gabbia | (Italy) | CB | 21 October 1999 (aged 23) | 2017 | 2026 | (Italy) Milan Primavera | Free | From Youth system | 50 | 1 |
Midfielders
| 4 | Ismaël Bennacer | (Algeria) | DM | 1 December 1997 (aged 25) | 2019 | 2027 | (Italy) Empoli | €16,000,000 | | 145 | 6 |
| 7 | Yacine Adli | (France) | CM | 29 July 2000 (aged 22) | 2022 | 2026 | (France) Bordeaux | €8,000,000 | | 6 | 0 |
| 8 | Sandro Tonali | (Italy) | CM | 8 May 2000 (aged 23) | 2020 | 2026 | (Italy) Brescia | €20,000,000 | | 131 | 7 |
| 10 | Brahim Díaz | (Spain) | AM | 3 August 1999 (aged 23) | 2020 | 2023 | (Spain) Real Madrid | €3,000,000 | Loan | 112 | 14 |
| 14 | Tiémoué Bakayoko | (France) | DM | 17 August 1994 (aged 28) | 2021 | 2023 | (England) Chelsea | Free | Loan | 52 | 1 |
| 32 | Tommaso Pobega | (Italy) | CM | 15 July 1999 (aged 23) | 2022 | 2027 | (Italy) Milan Primavera | Free | From Youth system | 28 | 3 |
| 33 | Rade Krunić | (Bosnia and Herzegovina) | DM | 7 October 1993 (aged 29) | 2019 | 2024 | (Italy) Empoli | €8,000,000 | | 125 | 3 |
| 40 | Aster Vranckx | (Belgium) | CM | 4 October 2002 (aged 20) | 2022 | 2023 | (Germany) VfL Wolfsburg | €2,000,000 | Loan | 10 | 0 |
| 56 | Alexis Saelemaekers | (Belgium) | RW | 27 June 1999 (aged 24) | 2020 | 2026 | (Belgium) Anderlecht | €7,200,000 | | 140 | 10 |
Forwards
| 9 | Olivier Giroud | (France) | ST | 30 September 1986 (aged 36) | 2021 | 2023 | (England) Chelsea | €1,000,000 | | 85 | 34 |
| 11 | Zlatan Ibrahimović | (Sweden) | ST | 3 October 1981 (aged 41) | 2020 | 2023 | (United States) LA Galaxy | Free | | 163 | 93 |
| 12 | Ante Rebić | (Croatia) | LW / ST | 21 September 1993 (aged 29) | 2019 | 2025 | (Germany) Eintracht Frankfurt | Undisclosed | | 113 | 29 |
| 17 | Rafael Leão | (Portugal) | LW | 10 June 1999 (aged 24) | 2019 | 2024 | (France) Lille | €28,000,000 | | 164 | 44 |
| 27 | Divock Origi | (Belgium) | ST / LW | 18 April 1995 (aged 28) | 2022 | 2026 | (England) Liverpool | Free | | 36 | 2 |
| 30 | Junior Messias | (Brazil) | RW | 13 May 1991 (aged 32) | 2021 | 2024 | (Italy) Crotone | €7,100,000 | | 69 | 12 |
| 90 | Charles De Ketelaere | (Belgium) | AM | 10 March 2001 (aged 22) | 2022 | 2027 | (Belgium) Club Brugge | €32,000,000 | | 40 | 0 |

== Transfers ==
=== Summer window ===
Deals officialised beforehand were effective starting from 1 July 2022.

==== In ====
| Date | Pos. | Player | Age | Moving from | Fee | Notes | Source |
|---|---|---|---|---|---|---|---|
| 1 July 2022 | DF | (Italy) Alessandro Florenzi | 31 | (Italy) Roma | €2,700,000 | From loan to definitive purchase | |
| 1 July 2022 | DF | (Republic of Ireland) Cathal Heffernan | 17 | (Republic of Ireland) Cork City | €50,000 | From loan to definitive purchase, joined Primavera team | |
| 5 July 2022 | FW | (Belgium) Divock Origi | 27 | (England) Liverpool | Free | | |
| 7 July 2022 | FW | (Brazil) Junior Messias | 31 | (Italy) Crotone | €4,500,000 | From loan to definitive purchase | |
| 2 August 2022 | MF | (Belgium) Charles De Ketelaere | 21 | (Belgium) Club Brugge | €32,000,000 | | |
| 29 August 2022 | DF | (Germany) Malick Thiaw | 21 | (Germany) Schalke 04 | €7,000,000 | | |
| 1 September 2022 | MF | (Poland) Dariusz Stalmach | 16 | (Poland) Górnik Zabrze | €700,000 | Joined join Primavera team | |

==== Loan in ====
| Date | Pos. | Player | Age | Moving from | Fee | Notes | Source |
|---|---|---|---|---|---|---|---|
| 1 September 2022 | MF | (Belgium) Aster Vranckx | 19 | (Germany) VfL Wolfsburg | €2,000,000 | | |
| 1 September 2022 | DF | (United States) Sergiño Dest | 21 | (Spain) Barcelona | Free | | |

==== Loan returns ====
| Date | Pos. | Player | Age | Moving from | Fee | Notes | Source |
|---|---|---|---|---|---|---|---|
| 1 July 2022 | MF | (France) Yacine Adli | 21 | (France) Bordeaux | | | |
| 1 July 2022 | MF | (Italy) Tommaso Pobega | 22 | (Italy) Torino | | | |

Total spending:▼€48,950,000

==== Out ====
| Date | Pos. | Player | Age | Moving to | Fee | Notes | Source |
|---|---|---|---|---|---|---|---|
| 29 March 2022 | MF | (Ivory Coast) Franck Kessié | 25 | (Spain) Barcelona | Free | End of contract | |
| 28 May 2022 | FW | (Norway) Jens Petter Hauge | 22 | (Germany) Eintracht Frankfurt | €10,000,000 | From loan to definitive purchase | |
| 30 June 2022 | DF | (Italy) Gabriele Galardi | 20 | Unattached | Free | After return from loan | |
| 30 June 2022 | DF | (Italy) Alessio Romagnoli | 27 | (Italy) Lazio | Free | End of contract | |
| 30 June 2022 | MF | (Croatia) (Italy) Emir Murati | 22 | Unattached | Free | End of contract | |
| 2 July 2022 | DF | (Italy) Marco Bosisio | 20 | (Italy) Bari | Free | From Primavera squad | |
| 8 July 2022 | DF | (Brazil) Léo Duarte | 25 | (Turkey) İstanbul Başakşehir | €2,000,000 | From loan to definitive purchase | |
| 12 July 2022 | FW | (Spain) Samu Castillejo | 27 | (Spain) Valencia | Free | | |
| 15 July 2022 | FW | (Italy) (Cameroon) Frank Tsadjout | 22 | (Italy) Cremonese | €850,000 | After return from loan | |
| 17 July 2022 | DF | (Italy) Riccardo Oddi | 20 | (Italy) Fiorenzuola | Free | After return from loan | |
| 19 July 2022 | FW | (Italy) Riccardo Tonin | 21 | (Italy) Foggia | Undisclosed | After return from loan | |
| 22 July 2022 | MF | (Italy) Marco Frigerio | 21 | (Italy) Foggia | Free | After return from loan | |
| 25 July 2022 | FW | (Italy) Sabino Signorile | 19 | (Italy) Audace Cerignola | Undisclosed | After return from loan | |
| 26 July 2022 | GK | (Italy) Alessandro Plizzari | 22 | (Italy) Pescara | €200,000 | After return from loan | |
| 26 July 2022 | FW | (Italy) Gabriele Capanni | 21 | (Italy) Ternana | Undisclosed | From loan to definitive purchase | |
| 28 July 2022 | DF | (France) (Cameroon) Leroy Abanda | 22 | (Belgium) Seraing | Free | After return from loan | |
| 30 July 2022 | DF | (Greece) Nikos Michelis | 21 | (Spain) Mirandés | Free | After return from loan | |
| 1 August 2022 | DF | (Italy) Luca Stanga | 20 | (Italy) Lecco | Undisclosed | From Primavera squad | |
| 9 August 2022 | DF | (Germany) Lenny Borges | 21 | Unattached | Free | From Primavera squad | |
| 31 August 2022 | MF | (Sweden) Lukas Björklund | 18 | (Denmark) SønderjyskE | Undisclosed | From Primavera squad | |
| 1 September 2022 | GK | (Italy) Sebastiano Desplanches | 19 | (Italy) Vicenza | €800,000 | From Primavera squad | |

Notes

1. ^{†} Loan transfer made permanent

==== Loans ended ====
| Date | Pos. | Player | Age | Moving to | Fee | Notes | Source |

==== Loans out ====
| Date | Pos. | Player | Age | Moving to | Fee | Notes | Source |
|---|---|---|---|---|---|---|---|
| 7 July 2022 | FW | (Italy) Lorenzo Colombo | 20 | (Italy) Lecce | Free | After return from loan | |
| 16 July 2022 | FW | (Italy) Marco Nasti | 18 | (Italy) Cosenza | Free | From Primavera squad | |
| 17 July 2022 | DF | (Italy) Gabriele Bellodi | 21 | (Italy) Olbia | Free | After return from loan | |
| 17 July 2022 | DF | (Italy) Mattia Caldara | 28 | (Italy) Spezia | Free | After return from loan | |
| 20 July 2022 | FW | (Brazil) Luan Capanni | 22 | (Portugal) Estrela Amadora | Free | After return from loan | |
| 29 July 2022 | MF | (Italy) Daniel Maldini | 20 | (Italy) Spezia | Free | | |
| 7 August 2022 | MF | (Italy) Marco Brescianini | 22 | (Italy) Cosenza | Free | After return from loan | |
| 31 August 2022 | FW | (Sweden) Emil Roback | 19 | (Denmark) Nordsjælland | Free | From Primavera squad | |
| 2 September 2022 | MF | (Croatia) Antonio Mionić | 21 | (Italy) Alessandria | Free | After return from loan | |

Total income:▲€13,850,000

=== Winter window ===
Deals officialised beforehand were effective starting from 2 January 2023.

==== In ====
| Date | Pos. | Player | Age | Moving from | Fee | Notes | Source |
|---|---|---|---|---|---|---|---|
| 3 January 2023 | GK | (Colombia) Devis Vásquez | 24 | (Paraguay) Guaraní | €0.47M | | |

==== Out ====
| Date | Pos. | Player | Age | Moving to | Fee | Notes | Source |
|---|---|---|---|---|---|---|---|
| 16 December 2022 | FW | (Brazil) Luan Capanni | 22 | (Poland) Arka Gdynia | Free | After anticipated return from loan | |

Total income

==== Loans out ====
| Date | Pos. | Player | Age | Moving to | Fee | Notes | Source |
|---|---|---|---|---|---|---|---|
| 10 January 2023 | GK | (Denmark) Andreas Jungdal | 20 | (Austria) Altach | Loan | | |
| 30 January 2023 | FW | (Italy) (Nigeria) Bob Murphy Omoregbe | 19 | (Italy) Torres | Loan | From Primavera squad | |
| 3 February 2023 | FW | (Serbia) Marko Lazetić | 19 | (Austria) Altach | Loan | | |
| 29 March 2023 | FW | (Sweden) Emil Roback | 19 | (Sweden) IFK Norrköping | Loan | After anticipated return from loan | |

== Pre-season and friendlies ==
Win Draw Loss Fixtures

| 13 July 2022 Friendly | Milan | 3–0 | Almenno Lemine | Carnago, Italy |
| 17:00 CEST (UTC+2) | Messias 8'; Rebić 10'; Gabbia 21' | Report | | Stadium: Milanello; Referee: Michele Pasculli |
Note: Match was three periods of twenty minutes each.

| 16 July 2022 Telekom Cup | 1. FC Köln | 1–2 | Milan | Cologne, Germany |
| 19:00 CEST (UTC+2) | Adamyan (yellow card) 40'; Dietz 86'; Hector (yellow card) 90' | Report | Giroud 16', 36'; Maldini (yellow card) 90' | Stadium: RheinEnergieStadion; Attendance: 48,200; Referee: Sascha Stegemann (Germany) |

| 23 July 2022 Friendly | Zalaegerszeg | 3–2 | Milan | Zalaegerszeg, Hungary |
| 18:00 CEST (UTC+2) | Tajti (yellow card) 5', (goal) 27'; Ubochioma 2'; Mocsi 25'; Májer (yellow card) 33'; Gergényi (yellow card) 64' | Report | Giroud 30' (pen.), (yellow card) 38'; Krunić 86' | Stadium: ZTE Arena; Referee: Andó-Szabó Sándor (Hungary) |

| 27 July 2022 Friendly | Wolfsberger AC | 0–5 | Milan | Klagenfurt, Austria |
| 19:00 CEST (UTC+2) | Veratschnig (yellow card) 8' | Report | Leão 39'; Rebić 41'; Messias 57'; Adli 60'; Gabbia 65' | Stadium: Wörthersee Stadion; Referee: Josef Spurny (Austria) |

| 31 July 2022 Friendly | Marseille | 0–2 | Milan | Marseille, France |
| 18:00 CEST (UTC+2) | Guendouzi (yellow card) 40'; Touré (yellow card) 77' (yellow-red card) 78' | Report | Messias 11'; Giroud 28'; Rebić (yellow card) 40'; Tonali (yellow card) 53' | Stadium: Stade Vélodrome; Referee: Mathieu Vernice (France) |

| 6 August 2022 Friendly | Vicenza | 1–6 | Milan | Vicenza, Italy |
| 19:00 CEST (UTC+2) | Rolfini 1'; Cataldi (yellow card) 17'; Jimenez (yellow card) 71'; Djibril (yellow card) 90' | Report | Leão 11'; Messias 21'; Rebić 30', 64'; Dalmonte 31' (o.g.); Tomori 50' | Stadium: Stadio Romeo Menti; Referee: Marco Monaldi |

| 7 August 2022 Friendly | Milan | 7–1 | Pergolettese | Carnago, Italy |
| 10:00 CEST (UTC+2) | De Ketelaere 4' (pen.), 19', 25'; Lazetić 27', 55'; Pobega 45'; Adli 73' | Report | Bevilacqua 84' | Stadium: Milanello; Referee: Enrico Maggio |

| 8 December 2022 Friendly | Milan | 3–2 | Lumezzane | Carnago, Italy |
| 14:30 CET (UTC+1) | Adli 51'; Alesi 67'; Eletu 78' | Report | Spini 10'; Mauri 54' | Stadium: Milanello; Referee: Minelli di Varese |

| 13 December 2022 Dubai Super Cup | Arsenal | 2–1 (4–3 p) | Milan | Dubai, United Arab Emirates |
| 18:00 GST (UTC+4) | Ødegaard 21'; Nelson 41'; Nketiah (yellow card) 71'; Elneny (yellow card) 77' | Report | Tomori 78' | Stadium: Al Maktoum Stadium; Attendance: 11,965; Referee: Sultan Mohamed Saleh (United Arab Emirates) |
| | Penalties |
| | Cédric (penalty scored); Gabriel (penalty scored); Marquinhos (penalty scored); Elneny (penalty scored); Smith (penalty missed) | | (penalty scored) Bennacer; (penalty missed) Brahim; (penalty scored) Tonali; (penalty scored) Lazetić; (penalty missed) Krunić |
Note: Arsenal gained 4 points from this fixture: 3 for the victory in 90 minutes and 1 for the penalty shoot-out victory.

| 16 December 2022 Dubai Super Cup | Liverpool | 4–1 (3–4 p) | Milan | Dubai, United Arab Emirates |
| 19:30 GST (UTC+4) | Salah 5'; Thiago 41'; Núñez 82', 88' | Report | Saelemaekers 29' | Stadium: Al Maktoum Stadium; Attendance: 15,000; Referee: Omar Mohamed Al Ali (United Arab Emirates) |
| | Penalties |
| | Tsimikas (penalty missed); Keïta (penalty missed); Carvalho (penalty scored); Clark (penalty scored); Núñez (penalty scored) | | (penalty scored) Bennacer; (penalty scored) Bakayoko; (penalty missed) Adli; (penalty scored) El Hilali; (penalty scored) Kalulu |
Note: Liverpool gained 3 points from this fixture for the victory in 90 minutes, and Milan gained 1 point for the penalty shoot-out victory.

| 30 December 2022 Friendly | PSV Eindhoven | 3–0 | Milan | Eindhoven, Netherlands |
| 18:15 CET (UTC+1) | Til 8'; Madueke 21', 56' | Report | | Stadium: Philips Stadion; Attendance: 36,500; Referee: Allard Lindhout (Netherlands) |

== Competitions ==
=== Overall record ===
| Competition | First match | Last match | Starting round | Final position | Record | | | | | | | |
| Competition | First match | Last match | Starting round | Final position | Pld | W | D | L | GF | GA | GD | Win % |
|---|---|---|---|---|---|---|---|---|---|---|---|---|
| Serie A | 13 August 2022 | 4 June 2023 | Matchday 1 | 4th | 38 | 20 | 10 | 8 | 64 | 43 | +21 | 52.63 |
| Coppa Italia | 11 January 2023 | | Round of 16 | Round of 16 | 1 | 0 | 0 | 1 | 0 | 1 | −1 | 0.00 |
| Supercoppa Italiana | 18 January 2023 | | Final | Runners-up | 1 | 0 | 0 | 1 | 0 | 3 | −3 | 0.00 |
| UEFA Champions League | 6 September 2022 | 16 May 2023 | Group stage | Semi-finals | 12 | 5 | 3 | 4 | 15 | 11 | +4 | 41.67 |
| Total | | | | | 52 | 25 | 13 | 14 | 79 | 58 | +21 | 48.08 |

Source: Soccerway

=== Serie A ===
==== League table ====
| Pos | Team | Pld | W | D | L | GF | GA | GD | Pts | Qualification or relegation |
|---|---|---|---|---|---|---|---|---|---|---|
| 2 | Lazio | 38 | 22 | 8 | 8 | 60 | 30 | +30 | 74 | Qualification for the Champions League group stage (Note: Should the first and second, or 17th and 18th-placed teams at the end of the season be tied on points, a play-off tiebreaker match was held at a neutral site to determine the title and final team relegated respectively.) |
| 3 | Inter Milan | 38 | 23 | 3 | 12 | 71 | 42 | +29 | 72 | Qualification for the Champions League group stage |
| 4 | Milan | 38 | 20 | 10 | 8 | 64 | 43 | +21 | 70 | Qualification for the Champions League group stage |
| 5 | Atalanta | 38 | 19 | 7 | 12 | 66 | 48 | +18 | 64 | Qualification for the Europa League group stage (Note: Since the winners of the 2022–23 Coppa Italia, Inter Milan, qualified for the Champions League, the Europa League berth awarded to the Coppa Italia winners was passed to the sixth-placed team, and the Europa Conference League berth awarded to the sixth-placed team was passed to the seventh-placed team.) |
| 6 | Roma | 38 | 18 | 9 | 11 | 50 | 38 | +12 | 63 | Qualification for the Europa League group stage |

Source: Serie A
Rules for classification: 1) Points; 2) Tiebreaker for Champions team and third relegated team; 3) Head-to-head points; 4) Head-to-head goal difference; 5) Goal difference; 6) Goals scored; 7) Draw. (Note: Head-to-head record is used only after all the matches between the teams in question have been played)

==== Results summary ====
| Overall | | | | | | | | Home | | | | | | Away | | | | | |
| Pld | W | D | L | GF | GA | GD | Pts | W | D | L | GF | GA | GD | W | D | L | GF | GA | GD |
|---|---|---|---|---|---|---|---|---|---|---|---|---|---|---|---|---|---|---|---|
| 38 | 20 | 10 | 8 | 64 | 43 | +21 | 70 | 13 | 4 | 2 | 41 | 20 | +21 | 7 | 6 | 6 | 23 | 23 | 0 |

Source: Serie A

==== Results by round ====
| Round | 1 | 2 | 3 | 4 | 5 | 6 | 7 | 8 | 9 | 10 | 11 | 12 | 13 | 14 | 15 | 16 | 17 | 18 | 19 | 20 | 21 | 22 | 23 | 24 | 25 | 26 | 27 | 28 | 29 | 30 | 31 | 32 | 33 | 34 | 35 | 36 | 37 | 38 |
|---|---|---|---|---|---|---|---|---|---|---|---|---|---|---|---|---|---|---|---|---|---|---|---|---|---|---|---|---|---|---|---|---|---|---|---|---|---|---|
| Ground | H | A | H | A | H | A | H | A | H | A | H | A | H | A | H | A | H | A | A | H | A | H | A | H | A | H | A | A | H | A | H | A | H | H | A | H | A | H |
| Result | W | D | W | D | W | W | L | W | W | W | W | L | W | D | W | W | D | D | L | L | L | W | W | W | L | D | L | W | D | D | W | D | D | W | L | W | W | W |
| Position | 3 | 5 | 2 | 6 | 3 | 3 | 5 | 5 | 5 | 3 | 2 | 3 | 2 | 3 | 2 | 2 | 3 | 2 | 2 | 5 | 6 | 5 | 4 | 3 | 5 | 4 | 4 | 3 | 4 | 4 | 4 | 5 | 6 | 5 | 5 | 4 | 4 | 4 |

Source: Serie A
A = Away; H = Home; W = Win; D = Draw; L = Loss

==== Matches ====
The league fixtures were announced on 24 June 2022.

| 13 August 2022 1 | Milan | 4–2 | Udinese | Milan |
| 18:30 CEST (UTC+2) | Hernandez 12' (pen.); Rebić 15', 68'; Brahim 46'; Krunić (yellow card) 34' | Report | Becão 2', (yellow card) 34'; Soppy (yellow card) 10'; Masina 45+4'; Pérez (yellow card) 55'; Ebosele (yellow card) 90+2' | Stadium: San Siro; Attendance: 70,197; Referee: Livio Marinelli |

| 21 August 2022 2 | Atalanta | 1–1 | Milan | Bergamo |
| 20:45 CEST (UTC+2) | Tolói (yellow card) 16'; Malinovskyi 29'; Hateboer (yellow card) 48'; Djimsiti (yellow card) 78'; De Roon (yellow card) 90+5' | Report | Rebić (yellow card) 45+1'; Bennacer 68'; Tonali (yellow card) 75'; Hernandez (yellow card) 78' | Stadium: Gewiss Stadium; Attendance: 19,216; Referee: Fabio Maresca |

| 27 August 2022 3 | Milan | 2–0 | Bologna | Milan |
| 20:45 CEST (UTC+2) | Leão 21'; Giroud 58'; Calabria (yellow card) 66'; Adli (yellow card) 86' | Report | Schouten (yellow card) 56' | Stadium: San Siro; Attendance: 70,430; Referee: Gianluca Manganiello |

| 30 August 2022 4 | Sassuolo | 0–0 | Milan | Reggio Emilia |
| 18:30 CEST (UTC+2) | Berardi (penalty missed) 22'; Frattesi (yellow card) 64'; Lopez (yellow card) 72'; Ferrari (yellow card) 76'; Defrel (yellow card) 86'; Álvarez (yellow card) 90+7' | Report | Hernandez (yellow card) 27'; Saelemaekers (yellow card) 43' | Stadium: Mapei Stadium; Attendance: 18,053; Referee: Giovanni Ayroldi |

| 3 September 2022 5 | Milan | 3–2 | Internazionale | Milan |
| 18:00 CEST (UTC+2) | Hernandez (yellow card) 9'; Leão 28', 60', (yellow card) 90+4'; Giroud (yellow card) 32', (goal) 54'; De Ketelaere (yellow card) 51'; Tonali (yellow card) 77' | Report | Dumfries (yellow card) 9'; Brozović 21', (yellow card) 39'; Džeko 67' | Stadium: San Siro; Attendance: 75,475; Referee: Daniele Chiffi |

| 10 September 2022 6 | Sampdoria | 1–2 | Milan | Genoa |
| 20:45 CEST (UTC+2) | Ferrari (yellow card) 54'; Đuričić 57'; Villar (yellow card) 66'; Quagliarella (yellow card) 90+3'; Augello (yellow card) 90+5'; Léris (yellow card) 90+7' | Report | Messias 6'; Leão (yellow card) 17' (yellow-red card) 47'; Giroud 67' (pen.) | Stadium: Stadio Luigi Ferraris; Attendance: 23,049; Referee: Michael Fabbri |

| 18 September 2022 7 | Milan | 1–2 | Napoli | Milan |
| 20:45 CEST (UTC+2) | Kjær (yellow card) 18'; Calabria (yellow card) 45'; Krunić (yellow card) 53'; Giroud 69'; Tomori (yellow card) 74' | Report | Politano 55' (pen.); Rrahmani (yellow card) 63'; Simeone (yellow card) 71', (goal) 78'; Zerbin (yellow card) 87' | Stadium: San Siro; Attendance: 72,573; Referee: Maurizio Mariani |

| 1 October 2022 8 | Empoli | 1–3 | Milan | Empoli |
| 20:45 CEST (UTC+2) | Haas (yellow card) 26'; De Winter (yellow card) 56'; Luperto (yellow card) 61'; Bajrami 90+2' | Report | Kjær (yellow card) 24'; Rebić 79'; Bennacer (yellow card) 90+1'; Ballo-Touré 90+3'; Leão 90+6' | Stadium: Stadio Carlo Castellani; Attendance: 15,497; Referee: Gianluca Aureliano |

| 8 October 2022 9 | Milan | 2–0 | Juventus | Milan |
| 18:00 CEST (UTC+2) | Tomori 45+1'; Brahim 54', (yellow card) 55'; Tonali (yellow card) 90+4' | Report | Cuadrado (yellow card) 26'; Kean (yellow card) 90+4'; Paredes (yellow card) 90+4' | Stadium: San Siro; Attendance: 75,530; Referee: Daniele Orsato |

| 16 October 2022 10 | Hellas Verona | 1–2 | Milan | Verona |
| 20:45 CEST (UTC+2) | Günter 19'; Magnani (yellow card) 67'; Hongla (yellow card) 68'; Faraoni (yellow card) 75' | Report | Veloso 9' (o.g.); Hernandez (yellow card) 81'; Tonali 81'; Rebić (yellow card) 90' | Stadium: Stadio Marcantonio Bentegodi; Attendance: 22,904; Referee: Davide Massa |

| 22 October 2022 11 | Milan | 4–1 | Monza | Milan |
| 18:00 CEST (UTC+2) | Brahim 16', 41'; Origi (yellow card) 31', (goal) 65'; Leão 84' | Report | Ranocchia 70'; Bondo (yellow card) 72' | Stadium: San Siro; Attendance: 72,938; Referee: Livio Marinelli |

| 30 October 2022 12 | Torino | 2–1 | Milan | Turin |
| 20:45 CET (UTC+1) | Schuurs (yellow card) 24'; Buongiorno (yellow card) 30'; Djidji 35'; Miranchuk 37'; Pellegri (yellow card) 71'; Linetty (yellow card) 87'; Lukić (yellow card) 90' | Report | Kalulu (yellow card) 35'; Messias 67'; Pobega (yellow card) 77' | Stadium: Stadio Olimpico Grande Torino; Attendance: 26,133; Referee: Rosario Abisso |

| 5 November 2022 13 | Milan | 2–1 | Spezia | Milan |
| 20:45 CET (UTC+1) | Hernandez 21', (yellow card) 83'; Bennacer (yellow card) 40'; Messias (yellow card) 63'; Giroud (yellow card) 83' (yellow-red card) 90', (goal) 89'; Tonali (yellow card) 90+3' | Report | Maldini 59'; Ampadu (yellow card) 74'; Ellertsson (yellow card) 81'; Nzola (yellow card) 83'; Caldara (yellow card) 88' | Stadium: San Siro; Attendance: 71,099; Referee: Michael Fabbri |

| 8 November 2022 14 | Cremonese | 0–0 | Milan | Cremona |
| 20:45 CET (UTC+1) | Ghiglione (yellow card) 47'; Vásquez (yellow card) 67'; Valeri (yellow card) 85'; Meïté (yellow card) 88' | Report | Leão (yellow card) 78'; Lazetić (yellow card) 88'; De Ketelaere (yellow card) 90+3' | Stadium: Stadio Giovanni Zini; Attendance: 14,758; Referee: Antonio Rapuano |

| 13 November 2022 15 | Milan | 2–1 | Fiorentina | Milan |
| 18:00 CET (UTC+1) | Leão 2'; Brahim (yellow card) 21'; Milenković 90+2' (o.g.) | Report | Barák 28', (yellow card) 49'; Mandragora (yellow card) 63'; Jović (yellow card) 74' | Stadium: San Siro; Attendance: 73,007; Referee: Simone Sozza |

| 4 January 2023 16 | Salernitana | 1–2 | Milan | Salerno |
| 12:30 CET (UTC+1) | Piątek (yellow card) 73'; Bradarić (yellow card) 75'; Bonazzoli 83'; Coulibaly (yellow card) 85'; Daniliuc (yellow card) 90+2' | Report | Leão 10'; Tonali 15'; Giroud (yellow card) 53' | Stadium: Stadio Arechi; Attendance: 29,541; Referee: Francesco Forneau |

| 8 January 2023 17 | Milan | 2–2 | Roma | Milan |
| 20:45 CET (UTC+1) | Leão (yellow card) 26'; Kalulu 30'; Bennacer (yellow card) 62'; Tomori (yellow card) 68'; Tonali (yellow card) 72'; Pobega 77' | Report | Çelik (yellow card) 9'; Zalewski (yellow card) 30'; Zaniolo (yellow card) 45+1'; Ibañez (yellow card) 82', (goal) 87'; Matić (yellow card) 90+1'; Abraham 90+3', (yellow card) 90+6' | Stadium: San Siro; Attendance: 74,103; Referee: Davide Massa |

| 14 January 2023 18 | Lecce | 2–2 | Milan | Lecce |
| 18:00 CET (UTC+1) | Hernandez 3' (o.g.); Baschirotto 23'; Maleh (yellow card) 64' | Report | Leão 58'; Calabria (yellow card) 67', (goal) 70'; Bennacer (yellow card) 86' | Stadium: Stadio Via del mare Attendance: 25,942; Referee: Daniele Orsato |

| 24 January 2023 19 | Lazio | 4–0 | Milan | Rome |
| 20:45 CET (UTC+1) | Milinković-Savić 4', (yellow card) 33'; Zaccagni 38'; Luis Alberto 67' (pen.); Felipe Anderson 75' | Report | Bennacer (yellow card) 26'; Kjær (yellow card) 54' | Stadium: Stadio Olimpico; Attendance: 45,000; Referee: Marco Di Bello |

| 29 January 2023 20 | Milan | 2–5 | Sassuolo | Milan |
| 12:30 CET (UTC+1) | Giroud 24', (yellow card) 90+1'; Tonali (yellow card) 38'; Rebić (yellow card) 45+4'; Calabria (yellow card) 46'; Krunić (yellow card) 61'; Origi 81'; Gabbia (yellow card) 87'; Pobega (yellow card) 90+5' | Report | Defrel 19'; Frattesi 22', (yellow card) 73'; Berardi 30'; Laurienté 47' (pen.); Obiang (yellow card) 53'; Kyriakopoulos (yellow card) 61'; Matheus Henrique 79'; Ruan (yellow card) 90+2' | Stadium: San Siro; Attendance: 70,428; Referee: Antonio Giua |

| 5 February 2023 21 | Internazionale | 1–0 | Milan | Milan |
| 20:45 CET (UTC+1) | Martínez 34'; Mkhitaryan (yellow card) 67'; Acerbi (yellow card) 68' | Report | Kalulu (yellow card) 32'; Gabbia (yellow card) 49'; Leão (yellow card) 62'; Giroud (yellow card) 84'; Rebić (yellow card) 88' | Stadium: San Siro; Attendance: 75,584; Referee: Davide Massa |

| 10 February 2023 22 | Milan | 1–0 | Torino | Milan |
| 20:45 CET (UTC+1) | Kjær (yellow card) 32'; Giroud 62' | Report | Gineitis (yellow card) 32'; Buongiorno (yellow card) 49'; Schuurs (yellow card) 68'; Radonjić (yellow card) 82' | Stadium: San Siro; Attendance: 68,268; Referee: Giovanni Ayroldi |

| 18 February 2023 23 | Monza | 0–1 | Milan | Monza |
| 18:00 CET (UTC+1) | Marlon (yellow card) 27'; Birindelli (yellow card) 55'; Rovella (yellow card) 62'; Machín (yellow card) 63' | Report | Messias 31'; Krunić (yellow card) 34'; Thiaw (yellow card) 69' | Stadium: Stadio Brianteo; Attendance: 14,012; Referee: Antonio Rapuano |

| 26 February 2023 24 | Milan | 2–0 | Atalanta | Milan |
| 20:45 CET (UTC+1) | Musso 26' (o.g.); Leão (yellow card) 28'; Thiaw (yellow card) 66'; Messias 86'; Krunić (yellow card) 90' | Report | Tolói (yellow card) 28' | Stadium: San Siro; Attendance: 72,202; Referee: Maurizio Mariani |

| 4 March 2023 25 | Fiorentina | 2–1 | Milan | Florence |
| 20:45 CET (UTC+1) | Cabral (yellow card) 29'; González 49' (pen.), (yellow card) 70'; Ikoné (yellow card) 59'; Jović 87' | Report | Thiaw (yellow card) 12'; Messias (yellow card) 35'; Kalulu (yellow card) 80'; Hernandez 90+5' | Stadium: Stadio Artemio Franchi; Attendance: 40,410; Referee: Marco Di Bello |

| 13 March 2023 26 | Milan | 1–1 | Salernitana | Milan |
| 20:45 CET (UTC+1) | Giroud 45+1', (yellow card) 59'; Tomori (yellow card) 90+4' | Report | Dia 61', (yellow card) 90+6'; Sambia (yellow card) 85'; Coulibaly (yellow card) 89' | Stadium: San Siro; Attendance: 71,870; Referee: Federico La Penna |

| 18 March 2023 27 | Udinese | 3–1 | Milan | Udine |
| 20:45 CET (UTC+1) | Pereyra 9'; Pérez (yellow card) 27'; Beto 45+1'; Walace (yellow card) 69'; Ehizibue 70'; Ebosele (yellow card) 90'; Becão (yellow card) 90+3' | Report | Ibrahimović 45+4' (pen.); Kalulu (yellow card) 61'; Tonali (yellow card) 90+2' | Stadium: Stadio Friuli; Attendance: 24,992; Referee: Daniele Doveri |

| 2 April 2023 28 | Napoli | 0–4 | Milan | Naples |
| 20:45 CEST (UTC+2) | Lobotka (yellow card) 40' | Report | Leão 17', 59'; Brahim 25'; Giroud (yellow card) 35'; Krunić (yellow card) 63'; Saelemaekers 67' | Stadium: Stadio Diego Armando Maradona; Attendance: 50,000; Referee: Antonio Rapuano |

| 7 April 2023 29 | Milan | 0–0 | Empoli | Milan |
| 21:00 CEST (UTC+2) | Pobega (yellow card) 38'; Tomori (yellow card) 90+9' | Report | Cambiaghi (yellow card) 90+3'; Satriano (yellow card) 90+4' | Stadium: San Siro; Attendance: 70,286; Referee: Matteo Marcenaro |

| 15 April 2023 30 | Bologna | 1–1 | Milan | Bologna |
| 15:00 CEST (UTC+2) | Sansone 1'; Posch (yellow card) 58'; Domínguez (yellow card) 70'; Kyriakopoulos (yellow card) 90' | Report | Pobega 40', (yellow card) 81'; Florenzi (yellow card) 55'; Calabria (yellow card) 80'; Vranckx (yellow card) 87' | Stadium: Stadio Renato Dall'Ara; Attendance: 29,024; Referee: Davide Massa |

| 23 April 2023 31 | Milan | 2–0 | Lecce | Milan |
| 18:00 CEST (UTC+2) | Thiaw (yellow card) 27'; Leão 40', 75' | Report | | Stadium: San Siro; Attendance: 72,614; Referee: Daniele Chiffi |

| 29 April 2023 32 | Roma | 1–1 | Milan | Rome |
| 18:00 CEST (UTC+2) | Matić (yellow card) 24'; Ibañez (yellow card) 71'; Cristante (yellow card) 84'; Abraham 90+4' | Report | Tomori (yellow card) 16'; Krunić (yellow card) 75'; Saelemaekers 90+7' | Stadium: Stadio Olimpico; Attendance: 64,191; Referee: Daniele Orsato |

| 3 May 2023 33 | Milan | 1–1 | Cremonese | Milan |
| 21:00 CEST (UTC+2) | Messias 90+3' | Report | Okereke 77'; Galdames (yellow card) 84'; Vásquez (yellow card) 90+2'; Pickel (red card) 90+6'; Ghiglione (yellow card) 90+8' | Stadium: San Siro; Attendance: 68,136; Referee: Luca Pairetto |

| 6 May 2023 34 | Milan | 2–0 | Lazio | Milan |
| 15:00 CEST (UTC+2) | Bennacer 17'; Hernandez 29'; Calabria (yellow card) 42'; Thiaw (yellow card) 89' | Report | Romagnoli (yellow card) 20'; Marušić (yellow card) 24'; Casale (yellow card) 61'; Pellegrini (yellow card) 88' | Stadium: San Siro; Attendance: 72,365; Referee: Antonio Rapuano |

| 13 May 2023 35 | Spezia | 2–0 | Milan | La Spezia |
| 18:00 CEST (UTC+2) | Adou (yellow card) 38'; Wiśniewski 75'; Esposito 85' | Report | Brahim (yellow card) 52' | Stadium: Stadio Alberto Picco; Attendance: 11,336; Referee: Daniele Doveri |

| 20 May 2023 36 | Milan | 5–1 | Sampdoria | Milan |
| 20:45 CEST (UTC+2) | Leão 9'; Giroud 23', 29' (pen.), 68'; Brahim 63'; Hernandez (yellow card) 75' | Report | Quagliarella 20'; Günter (yellow card) 27'; Zanoli (yellow card) 30'; Oikonomou (yellow card) 89' | Stadium: San Siro; Attendance: 72,105; Referee: Francesco Fourneau |

| 28 May 2023 37 | Juventus | 0–1 | Milan | Turin |
| 20:45 CEST (UTC+2) | Cuadrado (yellow card) 56' | Report | Messias (yellow card) 34'; Giroud 40'; Krunić (yellow card) 64' | Stadium: Juventus Stadium; Attendance: 40,231; Referee: Maurizio Mariani |

| 4 June 2023 38 | Milan | 3–1 | Hellas Verona | Milan |
| 21:00 CEST (UTC+2) | Giroud 45+2' (pen.); Leão 85', 90+2'; Hernandez (yellow card) 89' | Report | Magnani (yellow card) 49'; Sulemana (yellow card) 60'; Cabal (yellow card) 61'; Faraoni 71'; Depaoli (yellow card) 77' | Stadium: San Siro; Attendance: 71,102; Referee: Paolo Valeri |

=== Coppa Italia ===
| 11 January 2023 Round of 16 | Milan | 0–1 (a.e.t.) | Torino | Milan |
| 21:00 CET (UTC+1) | | Report | Djidji (yellow card) 14' (yellow-red card) 70'; Milinković-Savić (yellow card) 90+2'; Linetty (yellow card) 109'; Adopo 114' | Stadium: San Siro; Attendance: 58,000; Referee: Antonio Rapuano |

=== Supercoppa Italiana ===
| 18 January 2023 Final | Milan | 0–3 | Internazionale | Riyadh, Saudi Arabia |
| 18:00 CET (UTC+1) | Hernandez (yellow card) 77'; Tonali (yellow card) 85' | Report | Dimarco 10'; Džeko 21'; Barella (yellow card) 33'; Çalhanoğlu (yellow card) 72'; Martínez 77', (yellow card) 79' | Stadium: King Fahd International Stadium; Attendance: 51,357; Referee: Fabio Maresca |

=== UEFA Champions League ===
==== Group stage ====
The draw for the group stage was held on 25 August 2022.

| Pos | Team | Pld | W | D | L | GF | GA | GD | Pts | Qualification | CHE | MIL | SAL | DZG |
|---|---|---|---|---|---|---|---|---|---|---|---|---|---|---|
| 1 | (England) Chelsea | 6 | 4 | 1 | 1 | 10 | 4 | +6 | 13 | Advance to knockout phase | — | 3–0 | 1–1 | 2–1 |
| 2 | (Italy) Milan | 6 | 3 | 1 | 2 | 12 | 7 | +5 | 10 | Advance to knockout phase | 0–2 | — | 4–0 | 3–1 |
| 3 | (Austria) Red Bull Salzburg | 6 | 1 | 3 | 2 | 5 | 9 | −4 | 6 | Transfer to Europa League | 1–2 | 1–1 | — | 1–0 |
| 4 | (Croatia) Dinamo Zagreb | 6 | 1 | 1 | 4 | 4 | 11 | −7 | 4 | | 1–0 | 0–4 | 1–1 | — |

Source: UEFA
Rules for classification: Group stage tiebreakers

| 6 September 2022 1 | Red Bull Salzburg (Austria) | 1–1 | (Italy) Milan | Salzburg, Austria |
| 21:00 CEST (UTC+2) | Capaldo (yellow card) 17'; Okafor 28'; Gourna-Douath (yellow card) 68' | Report | Tomori (yellow card) 39'; Saelemaekers 40'; Calabria (yellow card) 44'; Brahim (yellow card) 89'; Origi (yellow card) 90+2' | Stadium: Red Bull Arena; Attendance: 29,520; Referee: Srđan Jovanović (Serbia) |

| 14 September 2022 2 | Milan (Italy) | 3–1 | (Croatia) Dinamo Zagreb | Milan, Italy |
| 18:45 CEST (UTC+2) | Giroud 45' (pen.); Saelemaekers 47'; Pobega 77' | Report | Oršić 56', (yellow card) 74'; Marin (yellow card) 90' | Stadium: San Siro; Attendance: 61,341; Referee: Jesús Gil Manzano (Spain) |

| 5 October 2022 3 | Chelsea (England) | 3–0 | (Italy) Milan | London, England |
| 21:00 CEST (UTC+2) | Fofana 24'; Kovačić (yellow card) 39'; Aubameyang 56'; James 62'; Thiago Silva (yellow card) 71' | Report | Krunić (yellow card) 8'; Ballo-Touré (yellow card) 15'; Tomori (yellow card) 42' | Stadium: Stamford Bridge; Attendance: 39,537; Referee: Danny Makkelie (Netherlands) |

| 11 October 2022 4 | Milan (Italy) | 0–2 | (England) Chelsea | Milan, Italy |
| 21:00 CEST (UTC+2) | Tomori (red card) 18'; Giroud (yellow card) 20'; Gabbia (yellow card) 32'; Krunić (yellow card) 35'; Pobega (yellow card) 66'; Tonali (yellow card) 89'; Ballo-Touré (yellow card) 90' | Report | Mount (yellow card) 20'; Jorginho 21' (pen.); Sterling (yellow card) 29'; Aubameyang 34'; Gallagher (yellow card) 86' | Stadium: San Siro; Attendance: 75,051; Referee: Daniel Siebert (Germany) |

| 25 October 2022 5 | Dinamo Zagreb (Croatia) | 0–4 | (Italy) Milan | Zagreb, Croatia |
| 21:00 CEST (UTC+2) | Ademi (yellow card) 43' | Report | Gabbia 39'; De Ketelaere (yellow card) 46'; Leão 49'; Giroud 59' (pen.); Ljubičić 69' (o.g.) | Stadium: Stadion Maksimir; Attendance: 20,572; Referee: Szymon Marciniak (Poland) |

| 2 November 2022 6 | Milan (Italy) | 4–0 | (Austria) Red Bull Salzburg | Milan, Italy |
| 21:00 CET (UTC+1) | Giroud 14', 57'; Krunić 46'; Messias 90+1' | Report | Okafor (yellow card) 44'; Gourna-Douath (yellow card) 61' | Stadium: San Siro; Attendance: 74,292; Referee: Antonio Mateu Lahoz (Spain) |

==== Knockout phase ====
===== Round of 16 =====
The draw for the round of 16 was held on 7 November 2022.

| 14 February 2023 First leg | Milan (Italy) | 1–0 | (England) Tottenham Hotspur | Milan, Italy |
| 21:00 CET (UTC+1) | Brahim 7'; Tonali (yellow card) 80'; Hernandez (yellow card) 90+2' | Report | Romero (yellow card) 48'; Dier (yellow card) 63' | Stadium: San Siro; Attendance: 74,320; Referee: Sandro Schärer (Switzerland) |

| 8 March 2023 Second leg | Tottenham Hotspur (England) | 0–0 (0–1 agg.) | (Italy) Milan | London, England |
| 20:10 GMT (UTC±0) | Romero (yellow card) 17' (yellow-red card) 77'; Lenglet (yellow card) 21'; Skipp (yellow card) 90+5' | Report | Thiaw (yellow card) 90+3' | Stadium: Tottenham Hotspur Stadium; Attendance: 61,602; Referee: Clément Turpin (France) |
Note: The match was originally scheduled to kick-off at 20:00 GMT, but was delayed by ten minutes due to the late arrival of both team buses.

===== Quarter-finals =====
The draw for the quarter-finals was held on 17 March 2023.

| 12 April 2023 First leg | Milan (Italy) | 1–0 | (Italy) Napoli | Milan, Italy |
| 21:00 CEST (UTC+2) | Bennacer 40', (yellow card) 60'; Saelemaekers (yellow card) 90+3'; Calabria (yellow card) 90+6' | Report | Zieliński (yellow card) 38'; Di Lorenzo (yellow card) 70'; Zambo Anguissa (yellow card) 70' (yellow-red card) 74'; Kim (yellow card) 78'; Rrahmani (yellow card) 90+3' | Stadium: San Siro; Attendance: 74,742; Referee: István Kovács (Romania) |

| 18 April 2023 Second leg | Napoli (Italy) | 1–1 (1–2 agg.) | (Italy) Milan | Naples, Italy |
| 21:00 CEST (UTC+2) | Di Lorenzo (yellow card) 45+7'; Kvaratskhelia (penalty missed) 82'; Osimhen 90+3'; Olivera (yellow card) 90+3' | Report | Giroud (penalty missed) 22', 43'; Hernandez (yellow card) 45+1'; Maignan (yellow card) 45+6' | Stadium: Stadio Diego Armando Maradona; Attendance: 52,728; Referee: Szymon Marciniak (Poland) |

===== Semi-finals =====
The draw for the semi-finals was held on 17 March 2023, after the draw for the quarter-finals.

| 10 May 2023 First leg | Milan (Italy) | 0–2 | (Italy) Internazionale | Milan, Italy |
| 21:00 CEST (UTC+2) | Krunić (yellow card) 45+1'; Tomori (yellow card) 64' | Report | Džeko 8'; Mkhitaryan 11', (yellow card) 45+1' | Stadium: San Siro; Attendance: 75,532; Referee: Jesús Gil Manzano (Spain) |

| 16 May 2023 Second leg | Internazionale (Italy) | 1–0 (3–0 agg.) | (Italy) Milan | Milan, Italy |
| 21:00 CEST (UTC+2) | Martínez 74', (yellow card) 82'; Barella (yellow card) 79' | Report | Thiaw (yellow card) 56'; Tonali (yellow card) 79'; Krunić (yellow card) 81'; Tomori (yellow card) 82' | Stadium: San Siro; Attendance: 75,567; Referee: Clément Turpin (France) |

== Statistics ==
=== Appearances and goals ===
| No. | Pos | Nat | Player | Total | | Serie A | | Coppa Italia | | Supercoppa Italia | | Champions League | |
| No. | Pos | Nat | Player | Apps | Goals | Apps | Goals | Apps | Goals | Apps | Goals | Apps | Goals |
Goalkeepers
| 1 | GK | (Romania) ROU | Ciprian Tătărușanu | 24 | 0 | 16 | 0 | 1 | 0 | 1 | 0 | 6 | 0 |
| 16 | GK | (France) FRA | Mike Maignan | 28 | 0 | 22 | 0 | 0 | 0 | 0 | 0 | 6 | 0 |
| 77 | GK | (Colombia) COL | Devis Vásquez | 0 | 0 | 0 | 0 | 0 | 0 | 0 | 0 | 0 | 0 |
| 83 | GK | (Italy) ITA | Antonio Mirante | 1 | 0 | 0+1 | 0 | 0 | 0 | 0 | 0 | 0 | 0 |
Defenders
| 2 | DF | (Italy) ITA | Davide Calabria | 33 | 1 | 21+4 | 1 | 0+1 | 0 | 1 | 0 | 6 | 0 |
| 5 | DF | (Senegal) SEN | Fodé Ballo-Touré | 14 | 1 | 5+5 | 1 | 0 | 0 | 0 | 0 | 1+3 | 0 |
| 19 | DF | (France) FRA | Théo Hernandez | 45 | 4 | 32 | 4 | 0+1 | 0 | 1 | 0 | 11 | 0 |
| 20 | DF | (France) FRA | Pierre Kalulu | 46 | 1 | 26+8 | 1 | 1 | 0 | 0+1 | 0 | 8+2 | 0 |
| 21 | DF | (United States) USA | Sergiño Dest | 14 | 0 | 2+6 | 0 | 1 | 0 | 0+1 | 0 | 1+3 | 0 |
| 23 | DF | (England) ENG | Fikayo Tomori | 45 | 1 | 32+1 | 1 | 1 | 0 | 1 | 0 | 10 | 0 |
| 24 | DF | (Denmark) DEN | Simon Kjær | 24 | 0 | 12+5 | 0 | 0 | 0 | 1 | 0 | 6 | 0 |
| 25 | DF | (Italy) ITA | Alessandro Florenzi | 6 | 0 | 2+4 | 0 | 0 | 0 | 0 | 0 | 0 | 0 |
| 28 | DF | (Germany) GER | Malick Thiaw | 24 | 0 | 15+5 | 0 | 0 | 0 | 0 | 0 | 3+1 | 0 |
| 46 | DF | (Italy) ITA | Matteo Gabbia | 17 | 1 | 6+6 | 0 | 1 | 0 | 0 | 0 | 2+2 | 1 |
Midfielders
| 4 | MF | (Algeria) ALG | Ismaël Bennacer | 40 | 3 | 24+4 | 2 | 0+1 | 0 | 1 | 0 | 9+1 | 1 |
| 7 | MF | (France) FRA | Yacine Adli | 6 | 0 | 1+5 | 0 | 0 | 0 | 0 | 0 | 0 | 0 |
| 8 | MF | (Italy) ITA | Sandro Tonali | 48 | 2 | 30+4 | 2 | 1 | 0 | 1 | 0 | 12 | 0 |
| 10 | MF | (Spain) ESP | Brahim Díaz | 45 | 7 | 27+6 | 6 | 1 | 0 | 1 | 0 | 8+2 | 1 |
| 14 | MF | (France) FRA | Tiémoué Bakayoko | 3 | 0 | 0+3 | 0 | 0 | 0 | 0 | 0 | 0 | 0 |
| 32 | MF | (Italy) ITA | Tommaso Pobega | 28 | 3 | 9+10 | 2 | 1 | 0 | 0 | 0 | 0+8 | 1 |
| 33 | MF | (Bosnia and Herzegovina) BIH | Rade Krunić | 34 | 1 | 18+5 | 0 | 0 | 0 | 0 | 0 | 9+2 | 1 |
| 40 | MF | (Belgium) BEL | Aster Vranckx | 10 | 0 | 2+7 | 0 | 1 | 0 | 0 | 0 | 0 | 0 |
| 56 | MF | (Belgium) BEL | Alexis Saelemaekers | 39 | 4 | 14+16 | 2 | 1 | 0 | 0 | 0 | 4+4 | 2 |
| 90 | MF | (Belgium) BEL | Charles De Ketelaere | 40 | 0 | 9+23 | 0 | 1 | 0 | 0+1 | 0 | 3+3 | 0 |
Forwards
| 9 | FW | (France) FRA | Olivier Giroud | 47 | 18 | 25+8 | 13 | 0+1 | 0 | 1 | 0 | 12 | 5 |
| 11 | FW | (Sweden) SWE | Zlatan Ibrahimović | 4 | 1 | 1+3 | 1 | 0 | 0 | 0 | 0 | 0 | 0 |
| 12 | FW | (Croatia) CRO | Ante Rebić | 31 | 3 | 10+13 | 3 | 0 | 0 | 0+1 | 0 | 2+5 | 0 |
| 17 | FW | (Portugal) POR | Rafael Leão | 48 | 16 | 28+7 | 15 | 0+1 | 0 | 1 | 0 | 11 | 1 |
| 27 | FW | (Belgium) BEL | Divock Origi | 36 | 2 | 10+17 | 2 | 0 | 0 | 0+1 | 0 | 0+8 | 0 |
| 30 | FW | (Brazil) BRA | Junior Messias | 36 | 6 | 19+6 | 5 | 0+1 | 0 | 1 | 0 | 2+7 | 1 |
Players transferred out during the season
| 22 | FW | (Serbia) SRB | Marko Lazetić | 1 | 0 | 0+1 | 0 | 0 | 0 | 0 | 0 | 0 | 0 |

Source: Competitions

=== Goalscorers ===
| Rank | No. | Pos. | Nat. | Player | Serie A | Coppa Italia | Champions League | Supercoppa Italiana | Total |
|---|---|---|---|---|---|---|---|---|---|
| 1 | 9 | FW | (France) | Olivier Giroud | 13 | 0 | 5 | 0 | 18 |
| 2 | 17 | FW | (Portugal) | Rafael Leão | 15 | 0 | 1 | 0 | 16 |
| 3 | 10 | MF | (Spain) | Brahim Díaz | 6 | 0 | 1 | 0 | 7 |
| 4 | 30 | FW | (Brazil) | Junior Messias | 5 | 0 | 1 | 0 | 6 |
| 5 | 19 | DF | (France) | Théo Hernandez | 4 | 0 | 0 | 0 | 4 |
| 5 | 56 | MF | (Belgium) | Alexis Saelemaekers | 2 | 0 | 2 | 0 | 4 |
| 7 | 4 | MF | (Algeria) | Ismaël Bennacer | 2 | 0 | 1 | 0 | 3 |
| 7 | 12 | FW | (Croatia) | Ante Rebić | 3 | 0 | 0 | 0 | 3 |
| 7 | 32 | MF | (Italy) | Tommaso Pobega | 2 | 0 | 1 | 0 | 3 |
| 10 | 8 | MF | (Italy) | Sandro Tonali | 2 | 0 | 0 | 0 | 2 |
| 10 | 27 | FW | (Belgium) | Divock Origi | 2 | 0 | 0 | 0 | 2 |
| 12 | 2 | DF | (Italy) | Davide Calabria | 1 | 0 | 0 | 0 | 1 |
| 12 | 5 | DF | (Senegal) | Fodé Ballo-Touré | 1 | 0 | 0 | 0 | 1 |
| 12 | 11 | FW | (Sweden) | Zlatan Ibrahimovic | 1 | 0 | 0 | 0 | 1 |
| 12 | 20 | DF | (France) | Pierre Kalulu | 1 | 0 | 0 | 0 | 1 |
| 12 | 23 | DF | (England) | Fikayo Tomori | 1 | 0 | 0 | 0 | 1 |
| 12 | 33 | MF | (Bosnia and Herzegovina) | Rade Krunić | 0 | 0 | 1 | 0 | 1 |
| 12 | 46 | DF | (Italy) | Matteo Gabbia | 0 | 0 | 1 | 0 | 1 |
| Own goals | | | | | 3 | 0 | 1 | 0 | 4 |
| Totals | | | | | 64 | 0 | 15 | 0 | 79 |

=== Assists ===
As of 29 April 2023

| Rank | No. | Pos. | Nat. | Player | Serie A | Coppa Italia | Champions League | Supercoppa Italiana | Total |
|---|---|---|---|---|---|---|---|---|---|
| 1 | 17 | FW | (Portugal) | Rafael Leão | 8 | 0 | 3 | 0 | 11 |
| 2 | 9 | FW | (France) | Olivier Giroud | 4 | 0 | 2 | 0 | 6 |
| 3 | 19 | DF | (France) | Théo Hernandez | 3 | 0 | 2 | 0 | 5 |
| 3 | 8 | MF | (Italy) | Sandro Tonali | 7 | 0 | 2 | 0 | 9 |
| 5 | 12 | FW | (Croatia) | Ante Rebić | 2 | 0 | 0 | 0 | 2 |
| 6 | 4 | MF | (Algeria) | Ismaël Bennacer | 2 | 0 | 0 | 0 | 2 |
| 6 | 2 | DF | (Italy) | Davide Calabria | 2 | 0 | 0 | 0 | 2 |
| 6 | 90 | FW | (Belgium) | Charles De Ketelaere | 1 | 0 | 0 | 0 | 1 |
| 6 | 10 | MF | (Spain) | Brahim Díaz | 7 | 0 | 1 | 0 | 8 |
| 6 | 33 | MF | (Bosnia and Herzegovina) | Rade Krunić | 1 | 0 | 0 | 0 | 1 |
| 6 | 30 | FW | (Brazil) | Junior Messias | 1 | 0 | 0 | 0 | 1 |
| 6 | 27 | FW | (Belgium) | Divock Origi | 1 | 0 | 0 | 0 | 1 |
| 6 | 56 | MF | (Belgium) | Alexis Saelemaekers | 2 | 0 | 0 | 0 | 2 |
| 6 | 1 | GK | (Romania) | Ciprian Tătărușanu | 1 | 0 | 0 | 0 | 1 |
| Totals | | | | | 38 | 0 | 9 | 0 | 47 |

=== Clean sheets ===
| Rank | No. | Pos. | Nat. | Player | Serie A | Coppa Italia | Champions League | Supercoppa Italiana | Total |
|---|---|---|---|---|---|---|---|---|---|
| 1 | 16 | GK | (France) | Mike Maignan | 7 | 0 | 2 | 0 | 9 |
| 2 | 1 | GK | (Romania) | Ciprian Tătărușanu | 4 | 0 | 3 | 0 | 7 |
| Totals | | | | | 11 | 0 | 5 | 0 | 16 |

=== Disciplinary record ===
As of 16 October 2022

| No. | Pos. | Nat. | Player | Serie A | | | Coppa Italia | | | Champions League | | | Total | | |
| No. | Pos. | Nat. | Player | Yellow card | (yellow card) (yellow-red card) | Red card | Yellow card | (yellow card) (yellow-red card) | Red card | Yellow card | (yellow card) (yellow-red card) | Red card | Yellow card | (yellow card) (yellow-red card) | Red card |
| 8 | MF | (Italy) | Sandro Tonali | 3 | | | | | | 1 | | | 4 | | |
| 19 | DF | (France) | Théo Hernandez | 4 | | | | | | | | | 4 | | |
| 4 | MF | (Algeria) | Ismaël Bennacer | 1 | | | | | | | | | 1 | | |
| 23 | DF | (England) | Fikayo Tomori | 1 | | | | | | 2 | | 1 | 3 | | 1 |
| 9 | FW | (France) | Olivier Giroud | 1 | | | | | | 1 | | | 2 | | |
| 10 | MF | (Spain) | Brahim Díaz | 1 | | | | | | 1 | | | 2 | | |
| 17 | FW | (Portugal) | Rafael Leão | 3 | 1 | | | | | | | | 3 | 1 | |
| 20 | DF | (France) | Pierre Kalulu | | | | | | | | | | | | |
| 56 | MF | (Belgium) | Alexis Saelemaekers | 1 | | | | | | | | | 1 | | |
| 90 | MF | (Belgium) | Charles De Ketelaere | 1 | | | | | | | | | 1 | | |
| 46 | DF | (Italy) | Matteo Gabbia | | | | | | | 1 | | | 1 | | |
| 11 | FW | (Sweden) | Zlatan Ibrahimović | | | | | | | | | | | | |
| 12 | FW | (Croatia) | Ante Rebić | 2 | | | | | | | | | | | |
| 2 | DF | (Italy) | Davide Calabria | 2 | | | | | | 1 | | | 3 | | |
| 5 | DF | (Senegal) | Fodé Ballo-Touré | | | | | | | 2 | | | 2 | | |
| 24 | DF | (Denmark) | Simon Kjær | 2 | | | | | | | | | 2 | | |
| 30 | FW | (Brazil) | Junior Messias | | | | | | | | | | | | |
| 27 | FW | (Belgium) | Divock Origi | | | | | | | 1 | | | 1 | | |
| 25 | DF | (Italy) | Alessandro Florenzi | | | | | | | | | | | | |
| 33 | MF | (Bosnia and Herzegovina) | Rade Krunić | 2 | | | | | | 2 | | | 4 | | |
| 33 | MF | (France) | Yacine Adli | 1 | | | | | | | | | 1 | | |
| 16 | GK | (France) | Mike Maignan | | | | | | | | | | | | |
| 27 | MF | (Italy) | Tommaso Pobega | | | | | | | 1 | | | 1 | | |
| Totals | | | | 17 | 1 | 2 | 5 | 0 | 0 | 14 | 1 | 0 | 27 | 1 | 0 |
