= Malick Thiaw =

German footballer (born 2001)

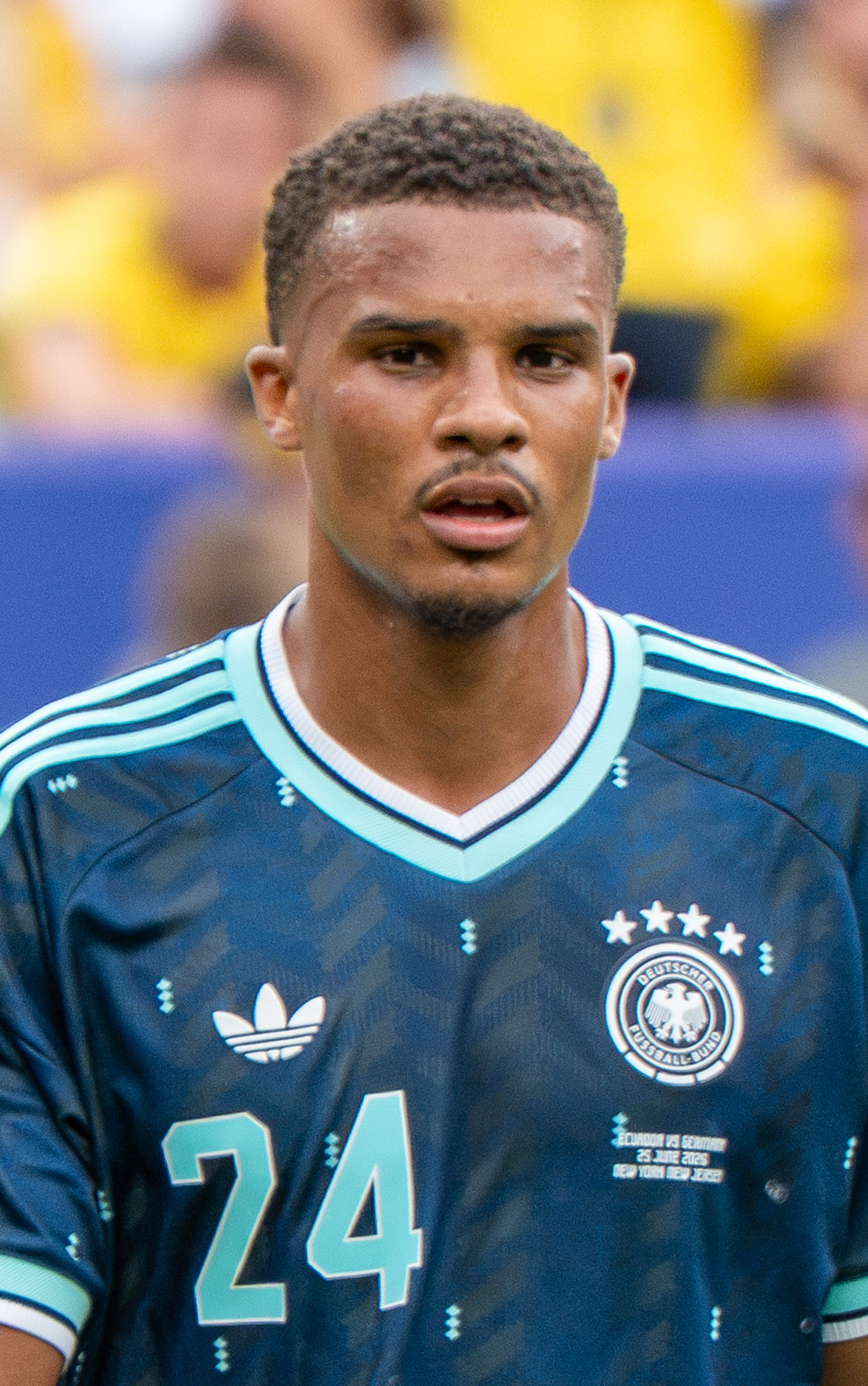
- Thiaw with Germany in 2026

Personal information
- Full name: Malick Laye Thiaw
- Date of birth: 8 August 2001 (age 25)
- Place of birth: Düsseldorf, Germany
- Height: 1.94 m (6 ft 4 in)
- Position: Centre-back

Team information
- Current team: Newcastle United
- Number: 12

Youth career
- 2006–2009: TV Kalkum-Wittlaer
- 2009–2010: Fortuna Düsseldorf
- 2010–2011: Bayer Leverkusen
- 2011–2015: Borussia Mönchengladbach
- 2015–2020: Schalke 04

Senior career*
Years	Team	Apps	(Gls)
2020–2022	Schalke 04	57	(4)
2022–2025	AC Milan	63	(0)
2025–	Newcastle United	45	(5)

International career^{‡}
2021–2023	Germany U21	11	(2)
2023–	Germany	10	(0)
- * Club domestic league appearances and goals as of 21 November 2026 (UTC) ‡ National team caps and goals as of 21:45, 13 November 2026 (UTC)

Malick Laye Thiaw (German pronunciation: [ˈmalɪk ˈtʃaʊ] CHOW; born 8 August 2001) is a German professional footballer who plays as a centre-back for Premier League club Newcastle United and the Germany national team.

== Club career ==
=== Early career ===
In his childhood Thiaw played for TV Kalkum-Wittlaer, a club in his native Düsseldorf. He then played for the youth teams of Fortuna Düsseldorf, Bayer Leverkusen, and Borussia Mönchengladbach.

=== Schalke 04 ===
In 2015 he joined the youth academy of Schalke 04. Thiaw made his professional debut with Schalke 04 during a 1–1 draw against TSG Hoffenheim in the Bundesliga on 7 March 2020.

=== AC Milan ===
On 29 August 2022, he moved to Italy joining Serie A club AC Milan on a contract until 30 June 2027, the transfer fee was believed to be €5 million paid upfront and €2 million on bonus-relating clauses.

Having spent the first half of his debut season mostly on the sidelines, making only a few short appearances as a substitute, Thiaw emerged into the team's starting XI in February 2023 following his man of the match performance against Tottenham Hotspur in the round of 16 of the 2022–23 UEFA Champions League. As the team's head coach Stefano Pioli opted to change the formation from 4–2–3–1 to 3–5–2, he began to start every forthcoming game in the middle of the defensive third, with Fikayo Tomori on the left and Pierre Kalulu on the right. However, when Pioli reversed his decision in March 2023 due to unsatisfactory results and went back to a four-man defense, Thiaw still kept his place as a starter, effectively becoming the team's second-choice center back after Tomori.

Ahead of the 2023–24 season, Thiaw and Tomori were the team's starting duo in central defense, with Kalulu and Simon Kjær as backups. The pair continued to play together until Thiaw's injury on 2 December 2023 in the game against Frosinone, which sidelined him for eight weeks.

On 5 November 2024, he scored his first goal for the club in a 3–1 away win against Real Madrid during the Champions League league phase.

=== Newcastle United ===
Thiaw with Newcastle United in 2026

On 12 August 2025, Thiaw signed for English club Newcastle United of the Premier League for an estimated £30 million (€35 million) transfer fee, plus £4.3 million in add-ons. He signed a long-term deal with the Magpies and chose to wear the shirt number 12, while also reuniting with his former AC Milan teammate Sandro Tonali at his new club. On 29 November 2025, Thiaw scored two goals and was awarded Player of the Match in a 4–1 away victory over Everton.

At the beginning of the 26/27 Premier League season, Thiaw was named the Captain of Newcastle United for their opening fixtures against Liverpool and Tottenham, during the absence of club captain Dan Burn.

== International career ==
Born in Germany to a Senegalese father and a Finnish mother, Thiaw holds German and Finnish passports.

In 2017, he was called up to represent the Finland U17s, but failed to make any appearance.

On 15 March 2021, Thiaw was called up to represent the Germany U21s for the 2021 UEFA European Under-21 Championship.

Aged just 21, he was called up to the Germany senior team by head coach Hansi Flick for the friendly matches against Peru and Belgium on 25 and 28 March 2023. Thiaw made his international debut for Germany on 16 June, starting in a 1–0 loss to Poland.

On 21 May 2026, he was selected in Germany’s 26-man squad for the 2026 FIFA World Cup.

== Personal life ==
Thiaw is the son of a Senegalese father and a Finnish mother from Oulu who lived in Germany. He speaks German, Finnish, Wolof, English and Italian. Thiaw identifies as a Muslim. On 14 November 2023, his wife Aminah gave birth to his daughter, Moussa Laye.

His cousin Issa Thiaw is a football coach and a former player.

== Career statistics ==
=== Club ===
As of match played 21 November 2026

Appearances and goals by club, season and competition
Club	Season	League			National cup (Note: Includes DFB-Pokal, Coppa Italia, FA Cup)		League cup (Note: Includes EFL Cup)		Europe		Other		Total	
Club	Season	Division	Apps	Goals	Apps	Goals	Apps	Goals	Apps	Goals	Apps	Goals	Apps	Goals
Schalke 04	2019–20	Bundesliga	4	0	0	0	—		—		—		4	0
Schalke 04	2020–21	Bundesliga	19	1	3	0	—		—		—		22	1
Schalke 04	2021–22	2. Bundesliga	31	2	1	0	—		—		—		32	2
Schalke 04	2022–23	Bundesliga	3	0	0	0	—		—		—		3	0
Schalke 04	Total		57	3	4	0	—		—		—		61	3
AC Milan	2022–23	Serie A	20	0	0	0	—		4 (Note: Appearances in UEFA Champions League)	0	—		24	0
AC Milan	2023–24	Serie A	21	0	0	0	—		9 (Note: Five appearances in UEFA Champions League, four appearances in UEFA Europa League)	0	—		30	0
AC Milan	2024–25	Serie A	22	0	2	0	—		5	1	2 (Note: Appearances in Supercoppa Italiana)	0	31	1
AC Milan	Total		63	0	2	0	—		18	1	2	0	85	1
Newcastle United	2025–26	Premier League	35	4	3	0	5	0	11	1	—		54	5
Newcastle United	2026–27	Premier League	10	1	0	0	1	0	—		—		11	1
Newcastle United	Total		45	5	3	0	6	0	11	1	—		65	6
Career total			165	8	9	0	6	0	29	2	2	0	211	10

=== International ===
As of match played 13 November 2026

Appearances and goals by national team and year
National team	Year	Apps	Goals
Germany	2023	3	0
Germany	2025	2	0
Germany	2026	5	0
Total		10	0

== Honours ==
Schalke 04

- 2. Bundesliga: 2021–22

AC Milan

- Supercoppa Italiana: 2024–25
