= Gravesend Grammar School =

Coordinates: 51°26′13″N 0°23′1″E

- Gravesend Grammar School Badge

Location
- Church Walk; Gravesend, Kent, DA12 2PR; United Kingdom

Information
- Type: Grammar School, Academy
- Motto: Consule Cunctis (Latin); Take thought for everyone
- Established: 1893
- Specialist: Languages, Maths, IT
- Department for Education URN: 137099 Tables
- Ofsted: Reports
- Chair of Decus Educational Trust: Graham Stedman
- Headteacher: Malcolm Moaby
- Gender: Boys (11+); Co-educational (16+)
- Age: 11 to 18
- Enrolment: 1213
- Houses: 6
- Colour
- Song: Consule Cunctis
- Publication: The Miltonian
- Former pupils: Old Gravesendians
- Website: https://gravesendgrammar.com/

Gravesend Grammar School is a selective grammar school with academy status located in Gravesend, Kent, England. The school accepts boys at age 11 through the 11+ exam accepting a cohort of the top 15–20% and boys and girls at 16, based on their GCSE results.

== School ==
Gravesend Grammar School was opened by Princess Beatrice, youngest daughter of Queen Victoria, on 19 July 1893 with due pomp and ceremony. The school was originally based in Darnley Road, Gravesend and later moved to the site of Milton Hall, the former home of Mayor G. M. Arnold JP, one of the school's founders. The original building is currently used as an adult education centre. The replacement building, erected between 1931 and 1938 and officially opened on 12 October 1938, is still in use. Although many alterations and additions have been made to it since it was originally constructed, including being partly rebuilt after being bombed during World War II, having been mistaken for Eton College.

A second school building, known as the Centenary Building, was built in 1993 to commemorate the school's 100th year and currently houses facilities including multiple computer facilities and chemistry labs. There are a number of mobile classrooms around the school site, used for various subjects, although these are beginning to be replaced by more permanent buildings.

In July 2009 a new sports centre was opened, adjacent to the sports hall, and named the Sanderson Sports Centre, after a former headmaster. Overall, there are 63 classrooms, including six computer rooms, all of which contain interactive whiteboards, as well as a library, a sports hall, several small music practice rooms and a canteen available to all staff and pupils. In 2013 the main school and the Centenary Building were linked by a new building containing eight new classrooms including a large art room and a lecture theatre. In 2016, a new music block was opened opposite a computer facility. This new music block has many new features and is a vast improvement on its predecessor. There are 3 practice rooms, a recording studio and a main room for clubs and other musical activities.

In 2004 the school gained specialist status as a maths and computing specialist school. This guarantees the school extra government funding in order to continue the running and expansion of its facilities. The school also gained language specialist status, in 2008.

In 2019, A £7 million expansion proposed by Gravesend Grammar School was approved. The new expansion includes:

- A new teaching block for Year 12 & 13 students

- A new Canteen.

This new expansion project would bring the number of new Year 7 students up from 174 to 210 students. Construction of the new Sixth Form block started in 2021 going smoothly. Construction of the Canteen started in March 2022. In July 2022, the project was paused over fire safety concerns because there were no fire hydrants or reliable water supplies. This equipment had to be installed at an additional cost of £900,000. In November 2022, the new sixth-form building opened whilst the new canteen opened in February 2023. On top of the new expansion, minor improvements have been enforced on the main school building, including roof asbestos removal, and new internal windows.

- Chair of the Local Governing Body: Anne Robinson
- Headteacher: Malcolm Moaby
- Deputy Headteachers: Sarah Tremain and James Deamer. Head of Lower School: Gareth Rapley. Head of Middle School: Emlyn Rees. Head of Sixth Form: Duncan Pallant.

On 1 August 2011 the school became an Academy Trust.

== Names and styles of the school ==
1893–1898 : The Gravesend Municipal Technical School
1898–1904 : The Gravesend Municipal Day School
1904–1914 : The Gravesend County Day School
1914–1946 : The County School for Boys, Gravesend
1946–1967 : The Gravesend Grammar School for Boys
1967–1982 : The Gravesend School for Boys
1982–1999 : Gravesend Grammar School for Boys
1999–present : Gravesend Grammar School

== Sixth form ==
The Sixth Form currently contains approximately 300 students, studying A Levels in a variety of subjects. Each week there is a "General Education" session for the Lower Sixth, attracting various speakers, such as the local MP or, for example, representatives from Israeli and Palestinian Support Charities. The school also provides free "Driveability" sessions for the Year 12 students that outline the various risks and responsibilities of learning to drive. There are several extracurricular clubs specifically for the Sixth Form, including Clinics, where students can opt in smaller, more intimate classes to help them secure the top grades. These include an A+ computing course, and a Film Club.

== Careers ==
Pupils begin to prepare for career choices in Year 9, where they start to have one lesson a fortnight being taught various aspects of careers, including interview techniques and a lecture how to write CVs. These lessons continue until the end of Year 11. In addition, all Year 10 pupils have a week's work experience in a variety of organisations, ranging from local schools to companies in Kent and in London. They also have group careers interviews with a Connexions advisor, with one on one sessions if requested. The school has a vast Careers Library that any student can use, containing prospectae and information from various universities, as well as information about possible career paths.

== Sport ==
Sport plays a very big part of life at the school with all GCSE students taking physical education short courses. There are a number of specialist PE teachers who coach a variety of teams, including cricket, football, badminton, rugby and hockey, as well as facilities for basketball, table tennis and athletics; handball was introduced in 2010.

The school arranges overseas rugby tours to South Africa, Canada, USA, New Zealand and Hong Kong. The school also produced a British Pentathlon Champion in 2011.

== Head masters ==
1893–1898 James T. Dalladay (qv. Arthur James Dalladay)
1898–1924 Henry F.A. Wigley
1924–1946 Revd Samuel Lister
1946–1963 William H.E. Stevens [
1963–1968 Peter Arnold-Craft
1968–1974 Roy Cooke
1974–1977 James Brogden
1978–1985 Peter T. Sanderson
1985–2000 Peter J. Read
2000–2018 Geoffrey S. Wybar
2018–present Malcolm Moaby

== Deputy head masters ==
1893–1898 Sidney A. Sworn
1898–1907 James T. Dalladay
1907–1931 David Foster
1931–1936 Harold Law
1936–1958 Arthur Richards
1958–1964 Les C. Furley
1964–1973 Edwin W. Walker
1973–1977 Peter T. Sanderson
1979–1986 John E. Edwards
1986–1990 Robin H. Curtis
1990–2013 Brian Simpson
2004–2008 Joanne L. Seymour
2015–2016 Malcolm Moaby
2019–present Sarah Tremain
2026-present James Deamer

== Notable former pupils ==
- Sir Derek Barton (1918–1998), organic chemist and Nobel Prize laureate
- George Box (1919–2013), statistician, president of the American Statistical Association, 1978, president of the Institute of Mathematical Statistics, 1979
- Robert Palmer, (1920–1944), recipient of the Victoria Cross
- David Brown DMus (1929–2014), professor of musicology, Southampton University, 1983–1989, leading Tchaikovsky specialist
- Richard Southwood (1931–2005), professor of Zoology and vice-chancellor of the University of Oxford, 1989–1993
- Johnny Hills (1934–2021), professional footballer, Tottenham Hotspur FC
- Brian Newbould (born 1936), professor of music, Hull University, 1979–2001
- Janis Antonovics (born 1942), professor of biology, University of Virginia, 1998–present, winner of the 1999 Sewall Wright Award
- David Nicholls (1943–2008), professional cricketer, Kent CCC
- David A. Cooke (born 1949), rugby player, Harlequins and England
- N. J. Higham (born 1951), Emeritus Professor of Medieval and Landscape History, Manchester University
- Roger Parker (born 1951), Thurston Dart Professor of Music, King's College London, 2007–2020
- Geoff Whitehorn (born 1951), guitarist and singer-songwriter, member of Procol Harum
- Rt Revd Tony Porter (born 1952), Bishop of Sherwood, 2006–2020
- Richard T. Russell (born 1952), author of BBC BASIC for Windows programming language
- Paul Greengrass (born 1955), BAFTA-winning and Academy Award-nominated film director
- Alan Riach (born 1957), professor of Scottish literature, Glasgow University, 2001–present
- Anthony Michaels-Moore (born 1957), Grammy-nominated operatic baritone
- Stephen Webster MBE (born 1960), jewellery designer
- Mike Woodin (1965–2004), former principal spokesman for the Green Party of England and Wales and Oxford City councillor
- Simon Adams (Paul Ritter) (1966–2021), actor, Friday Night Dinner, Chernobyl, Quantum of Solace, Harry Potter and the Half-Blood Prince
- Adrian Owen (born 1966), professor of cognitive neuroscience and imaging, University of Western Ontario, Canada, 2010–present
- Alex Beard (born 1967), chief executive Glencore UK 2007–2019
- Neil McDonald (born 1967), chess grandmaster
- Tan Dhesi (born 1978), mayor of Gravesham, 2011–2012, Member of Parliament for Slough, 2017–present
- Matthew Sperling (born 1982), novelist and academic
- Andrew Cave-Brown (born 1988), professional footballer, Leyton Orient FC
- Sam Walker (born 1991), professional footballer, Reading FC
- Fikayo Tomori (born 1997), professional footballer, AC Milan and England
- Olamide Sodeke (born 2005), Saracens and U20 England Rugby Union player
