= Johnny Hills =

English footballer (1934–2021)

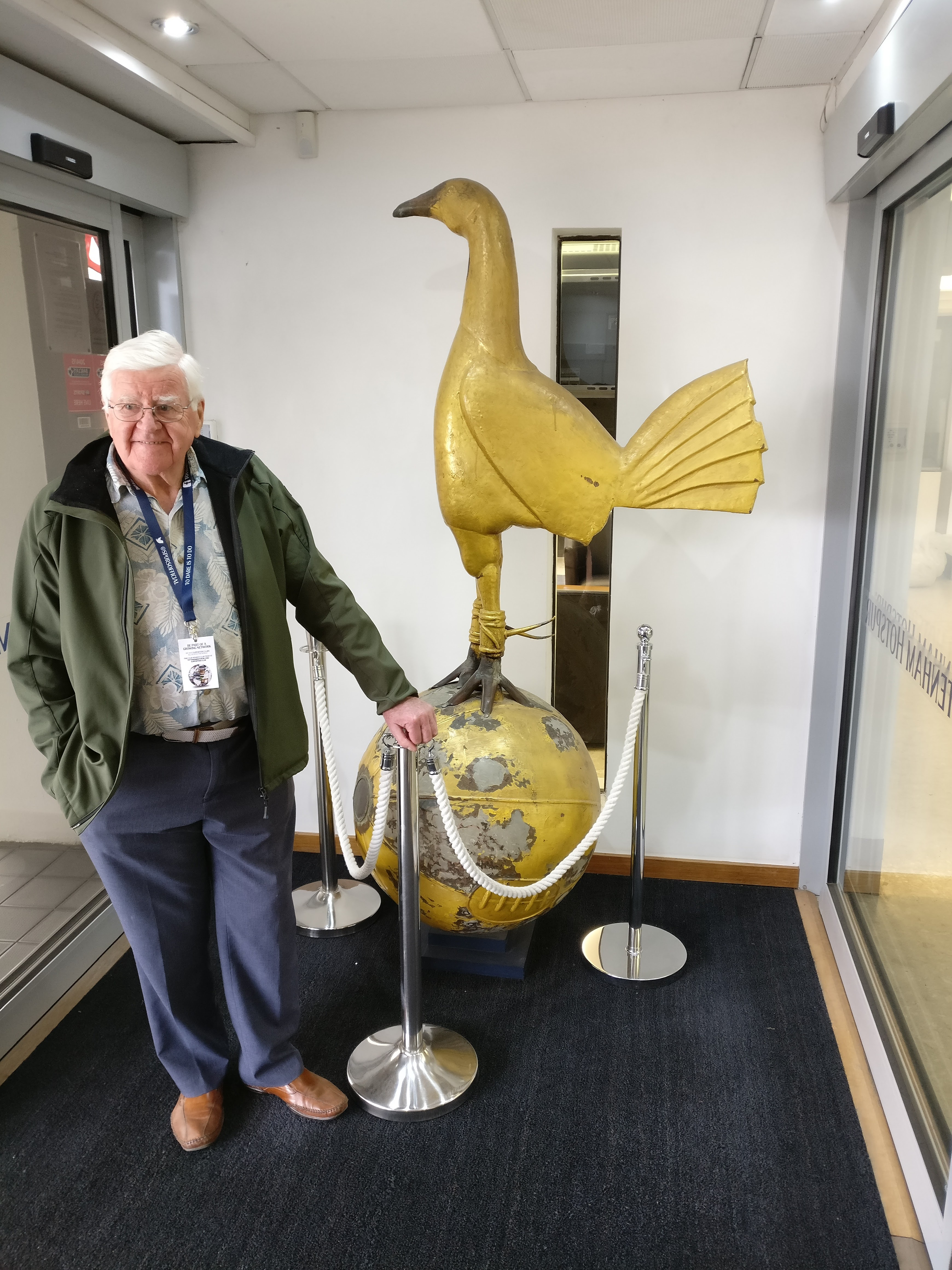
- Hills (left) at White Hart Lane in 2016

Personal information
- Full name: John Raymond Hills
- Date of birth: 24 February 1934
- Place of birth: Gravesend, England
- Date of death: 28 November 2021 (aged 87)
- Place of death: Brussels, Belgium
- Position: Full back

Youth career
- Dashwood Athletic
- 19??–1950: Gravesend & Northfleet

Senior career*
Years	Team	Apps	(Gls)
1950–1961	Tottenham Hotspur	29	(0)
1961	Bristol Rovers	7	(0)
1962	Margate		
Total		36	(0)
- * Club domestic league appearances and goals

John Raymond Hills (24 February 1934 – 28 November 2021) was an English professional footballer who played for Gravesend & Northfleet, Tottenham Hotspur and Bristol Rovers.

== Playing career ==
Hills was educated at the Gravesend County Grammar School. He played his early football with Dashwood Athletic before signing for Gravesend & Northfleet.

Tottenham Hotspur signed Hills as an amateur in March 1950. After completing National Service with the RAF, Hills signed professional forms for the Spurs in August 1953. Originally an inside forward the club converted him to full back. He made his senior debut against Blackpool on 14 December 1957 and kept his place in the team during the season making 21 league and two FA Cup appearances while Tottenham Hotspurs finished third.He made seven appearances in the 1958–59 season and two in the 1959–60 season. Hills started in the club's all-time record win, a 13–2 in an FA Cup replay against Crewe Alexandra on 3 February 1960. The highlight of his White Hart Lane career was the first shared 4–4 draw with Arsenal on 22 February 1958. The clubs shared their first 4–4 draw in Division One with the Gunners leading 4–2 with 86 minutes played before Tommy Harmer converted a penalty and Bobby Smith scored the equaliser. In all, he featured in over 200 fixtures for the first team and the reserve team, earning The Football Combination medal in the 1956–57 season.

In July 1961 Hills transferred to Bristol Rovers where he participated in seven matches. A year later, he joined Margate before a knee injury ended his competitive career.

== Post-football career ==
After retiring from football, Hills qualified as a PE teacher and taught in Belgium, Paris and Sri Lanka before retiring and settling in Brussels, where he died on 28 November 2021, at the age of 87.
