= Matthew Sperling =

British writer

Matthew Sperling (born 1982) is a British-American novelist and academic.

His first novel, Astroturf, was published in 2018. It was chosen as a best summer book by Joe Dunthorne in The Guardian and as a Book of the Year by Rebecca Tamás in The White Review, and was longlisted for the Wellcome Book Prize 2019. His second novel, Viral, was published in 2020. It was chosen as Novel of the Week in The Sunday Telegraph and named as a book that should have been on the Booker Prize shortlist in The Irish Times. Sperling was listed among “important male novelists under 40” by James Marriott in The Times in 2020.

Sperling was educated at Gravesend Grammar School and the University of Oxford, and is Associate Professor of Creative and Critical Writing at University College London. He regularly writes about modern art for Apollo magazine. He was a judge for the Orwell Prize for Political Fiction in 2020.

== Works ==
=== Fiction ===
- Astroturf (riverrun, 2018) ISBN 9781787471153
- Viral (riverrun, 2020) ISBN 9781529401950

=== Literary Criticism ===
- Visionary Philology: Geoffrey Hill and the Study of Words (Oxford University Press, 2014) ISBN 9780198701088

=== Interviews ===
- "Creatives in profile: interview with Matthew Sperling", Nothing in the Rulebook (September 2020)
