= Peter Arnold-Craft =

British headmaster and historian

Peter Arnold-Craft JP, MA (Oxon)
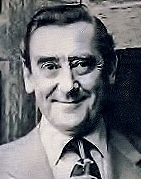
- Born: Peter H. Arnold-Craft; 8 January 1926; Nunnington, Yorkshire, UK
- Died: 11 July 2004 (aged 78); North Yorkshire, UK
- Education: Brasenose College, Oxford
- Occupations: Headmaster and Historian
- Title: Headmaster of the Gravesend Grammar School and The Liverpool Blue Coat School
- Term: Gravesend: 1963–1968; Blue Coat: 1968–1989
- Predecessor: Gravesend: W.H.E. Stevens, FRSA; Blue Coat: G.G. Watcyn, BA
- Successor: Gravesend: R. Cook; Blue Coat: J.C. Speller, BA, MA, FRSA

Peter Arnold-Craft (1926–2004) was a British headmaster and historian. Arnold-Craft was headmaster at Gravesend Grammar School between 1963 and 1968, and then became headmaster at the prestigious Liverpool Blue Coat School, where he served for twenty-one years. As well as this, Arnold-Craft edited a number of books about 18th century portraiture with J.S. Millward.

== Early life and education ==
Peter Arnold-Craft was born in Nunnington in North Yorkshire, his parents were both teachers. From school Arnold-Craft went up to Brasenose College, Oxford, where he studied history. His studies were interrupted by the war, during which Arnold-Craft served as a flight lieutenant in the Royal Air Force. Arnold-Craft returned to his studies at Oxford, gaining a first class honours degree and also earned a tennis Blue

== Career and life ==
After Oxford Arnold-Craft taught history at Magdalen College School, Oxford steering and inspiring many pupils to Oxford and Cambridge, among them several who went on to be headmasters themselves. He then became the headmaster at Gravesend Grammar School in 1963. in 1968, after his five years at Gravesend, Arnold-Craft took up the post of headmaster at the Liverpool Blue Coat School, a boys day and boarding grammar school in Liverpool, remaining until his retirement in 1989, making him one of the longest serving headmasters at Blue Coat. He gained a reputation as one of the most respected figures in the Blue Coat School's 300-year history. Arnold-Craft guided many pupils at the school to Oxford and Cambridge and oversaw an era in which the academic success of the school flourished. Arnold-Craft also fought rigorously to overturn the "cease to maintain order" placed on the school in 1984 by the militant-led city council, eventually succeeding with the help of the then education secretary Sir Keith Joseph and 32,596 supporters who opposed the action of the council.

During his professional career as a master and headmaster, Arnold-Craft published five books as editor, about 18th century history, particularly focusing on portraiture. These books, co-edited with J.S. Millward, were published between 1962 and 1969.

Arnold-Craft retired in 1989 to North Yorkshire where he died in 2004. A memorial plaque in the school chapel of the Liverpool Blue Coat School was unveiled after his death, and an award for creative writing named after Arnold-Craft is still given at the Blue Coat School. Gravesend Grammar School also awards a school prize in his honour.
