= Alan Riach =

Scottish poet and academic

Alan Scott Riach (born 1 August 1957) is a Scottish poet and academic.

He was born in Airdrie, Lanarkshire, and was educated at Gravesend Grammar School for Boys, Churchill College, Cambridge (BA 1979) and the University of Glasgow (PhD 1985). He taught at the University of Waikato in New Zealand from 1986 until 2001. He is currently the Professor of Scottish Literature at the University of Glasgow. Riach was President of the Association for Scottish Literary Studies from 2006 to 2010 and is a regular contributor to The National.

== Publications ==
- This Folding Map (Auckland University Press, 1990)
- An Open Return (Untold Books, 1991)
- Hugh MacDiarmid's Epic Poetry (Edinburgh University Press, 1991)
- First & Last Songs (Chapman, 1995)
- The Poetry of Hugh MacDiarmid:: Scotnotes Study Guide (Association for Scottish Literary Studies, 1999)
- Clearances (Scottish Cultural Press, 2001)
- Representing Scotland in Literature, Popular Culture and Iconography: The Masks of the Modern Nation (Palgrave Macmillan, 2005)
- The Scars of Billy Bones: A Toast to the Memory of Robert Louis Stevenson (Robert Louis Stevenson Club, 2008)
- Homecoming: new poems 2001-2009 (Luath, 2009)
- Arts of Independence: the cultural argument and why it matters most (with Alexander Moffat) (Luath, 2014)
- The Birlinn of Clanranald (Kettillonia, 2015)
- The International Companion to Edwin Morgan (editor) (Scottish Literature International, 2015)
- The Hunterian Poems: An Anthology of Poems to Paintings from the collection of The Hunterian at the University of Glasgow (Freight Books, 2015)
- Arts and the Nation: a Critical Re-examination of Scottish Literature, Painting, Music and Culture (with Alexander Moffat and John Purser) (Luath Press, 2017)
- The Winter Book (Luath Press, 2017)
- The MacDiarmid Memorandum: Poems by Alan Riach (Scotland Street Press, 2023)
