= Alex Beard (artist) =

American painter

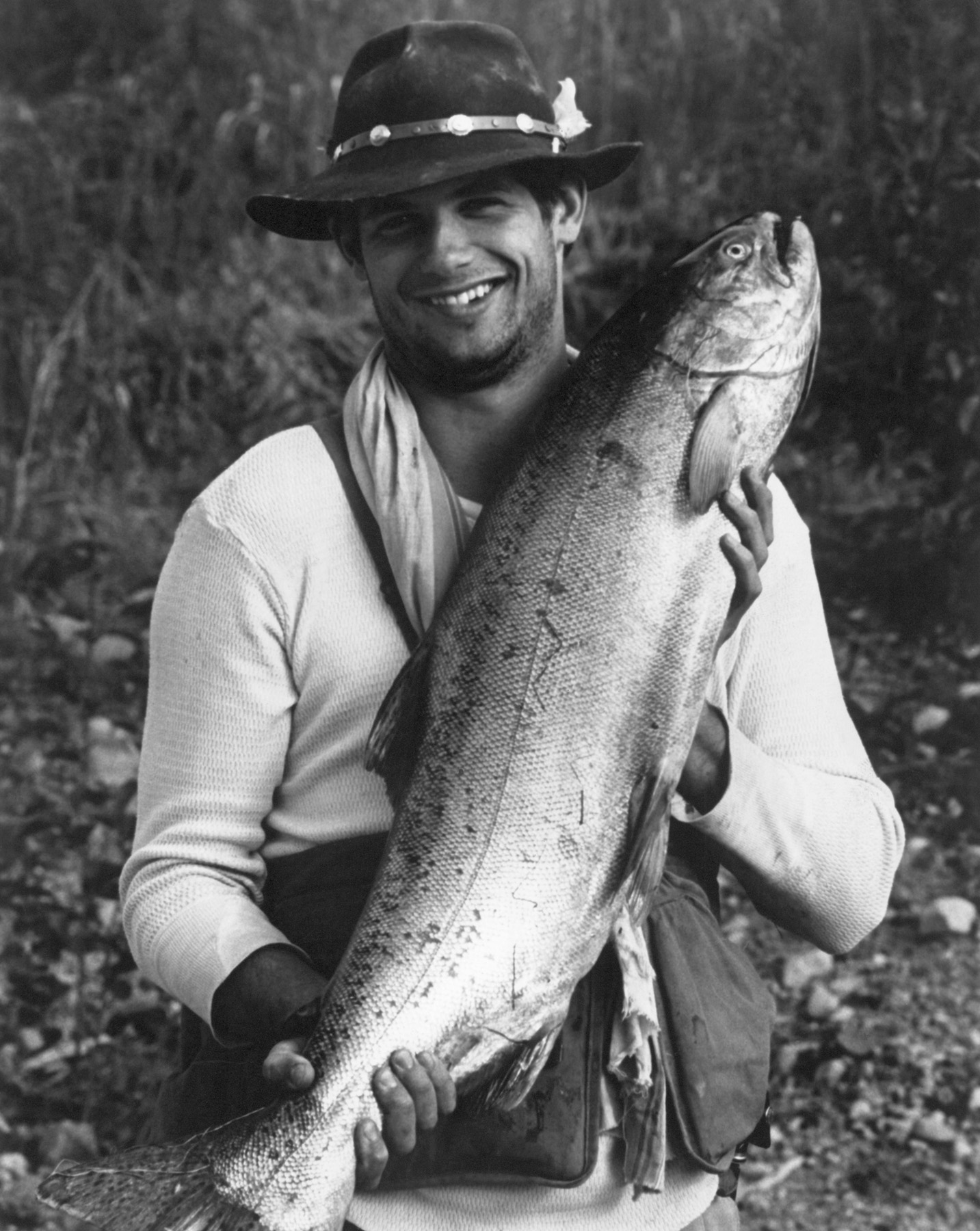
- Beard Portrait
- Born: October 29, 1970 (age 56); New York City, U.S.
- Education: Tufts University; New Orleans Academy of Fine Arts
- Known for: Painting; drawing; author
- Website: www.alexbeardstudio.com

Alex Beard (born 1970) is an American artist born in New York City who is now based out of New Orleans. His work ranges from simple and representational to abstract. He frequently draws and paints African wildlife.

== Biography ==
Alex Beard was born in 1970 in New York City. His father is philanthropist Sam Beard who co-founded the Jefferson Awards for Public Service. His mother, Patricia Beard, is an author and was a former magazine editor. He is the nephew of photographer Peter Beard. As a teenager, he travelled to Panama, Africa, China, India, and Belize.

Beard attended Tufts University and received a degree in history and literature. He also studied classical drawing and painting at The School of the Museum of Fine Arts, Boston and was a participant in the New York Studio School's drawing marathon. In his early twenties, Beard moved to New Orleans to study advanced painting at The New Orleans Academy of Fine Arts. He credits his world travels for helping him develop his artistic skills and broadened perspective. Beard worked as a writer, artist, and photographer for Tribe Magazine, a small New Orleans magazine publication in the mid-nineties. In New Orleans, he opened his first gallery and open studio in the French Quarter. He also married and became a father of two.

Displaced from New Orleans due to Hurricane Katrina, Beard and his family moved back to New York City. He ran a studio in SoHo which doubled as an exhibition place from 2006 to 2009. In 2009, Beard returned to New Orleans.

Beard is on the Board of Selectors of Jefferson Awards for Public Service.

== Art ==
Beard's artwork consists mostly of ink drawings and oil paintings. His uncle Peter Beard first taught him how to use an ink quill when he was a child, as well as encouraged him from a very young age to be an artist and businessman. The subject matter of the majority of Beard's artwork is wildlife using a style of painting he calls Abstract Naturalism. This is a combination of abstract expressionism and naturalistic environmental art. The only human subject matter that he works with is a mathematical sequence called "The Audience."

== Books ==
Beard is the author of Tales from the Watering Hole, a series of books penned and illustrated by Beard and published by Abrams Books. The Jungle Grapevine was published in 2009, Monkey See, Monkey Draw was published in 2011, and Crocodile's Tears was published in 2012. "Crocodile's Tears" was reviewed by The New York Times in February 2012 by author Pamela Paul. Beard's fourth book in the series The Lying King was published on September 4, 2018 by Greenleaf Book Group.

An app based on Beard's trilogy of books, also named Tales from the Watering Hole, was published in 2013 by Fat Red Couch, Inc. In 2008, Beard released a line of jigsaw puzzles featuring his artwork. The puzzle pieces feature unique shapes that do not snap into each other like usual puzzles. Instead, they settle side by side. This allows the puzzles to have many different combinations of results. In 2015, a series of needlepoint canvases based on Beard's work was released by QS Designs in New Orleans, LA.
