= Malik Djibril =

Togolese footballer (born 2003)

Personal information
- Date of birth: 30 August 2003 (age 23)
- Place of birth: Bassano Del Grappa, Italy
- Height: 1.81 m (5 ft 11 in)
- Position: Midfielder

Team information
- Current team: Salernitana

Youth career
- –2017: Cittadella
- 2017–2022: Fiorentina
- 2021–2022: → Vicenza (loan)
- 2022: Pornese piazza sabato

Senior career*
Years	Team	Apps	(Gls)
2022–2023	Vicenza	1	(0)
2022–2023	Barcelona(Loan)	23	(0)
2023–2025	Lucchese	26	(0)
2025–2026	Picerno	22	(0)
2026–	Salernitana	0	(0)
- * Club domestic league appearances and goals as of 1 May 2026

Malik Djibril (born 30 August 2003) is a professional footballer who plays as a midfielder for Italian Serie C Group C club Salernitana. Born in Italy, he represents Togo internationally.

== Club career ==
Djibril made his Serie B debut for Vicenza on 2 March 2022 in a game against Reggina.

On 1 September 2022, Djibril was loaned by Fidelis Andria in Serie C.

On 22 July 2023, Djibril signed a three-year contract with Lucchese.

== International career ==
Djibril was called up to the Togo national team in March 2022. He did not make his debut for his nation at that time.
