= Cerebral Cortex (journal) =

- Discipline: Neuroscience, Neuropsychology, Neurology
- Language: English
- Edited by: Marina Pavlova

Publication details
- History: 1991–present
- Publisher: Oxford University Press
- Impact factor: 2.9 (2024)

Standard abbreviations
- ISO 4: Cereb. Cortex

Indexing
- ISSN: 1047-3211 (print); 1460-2199 (web)
- LCCN: 91658541
- OCLC no.: 20665497

Links
- Journal homepage; Online archive

Cerebral Cortex is a peer-reviewed scientific journal in the neuroscience area, focusing on the development, organization, plasticity, and function of the cerebral cortex, including the hippocampus. It is published by Oxford University Press, and had as its founding editor Patricia Goldman-Rakic.
