= Fikayo Tomori =

English footballer (born 1997)

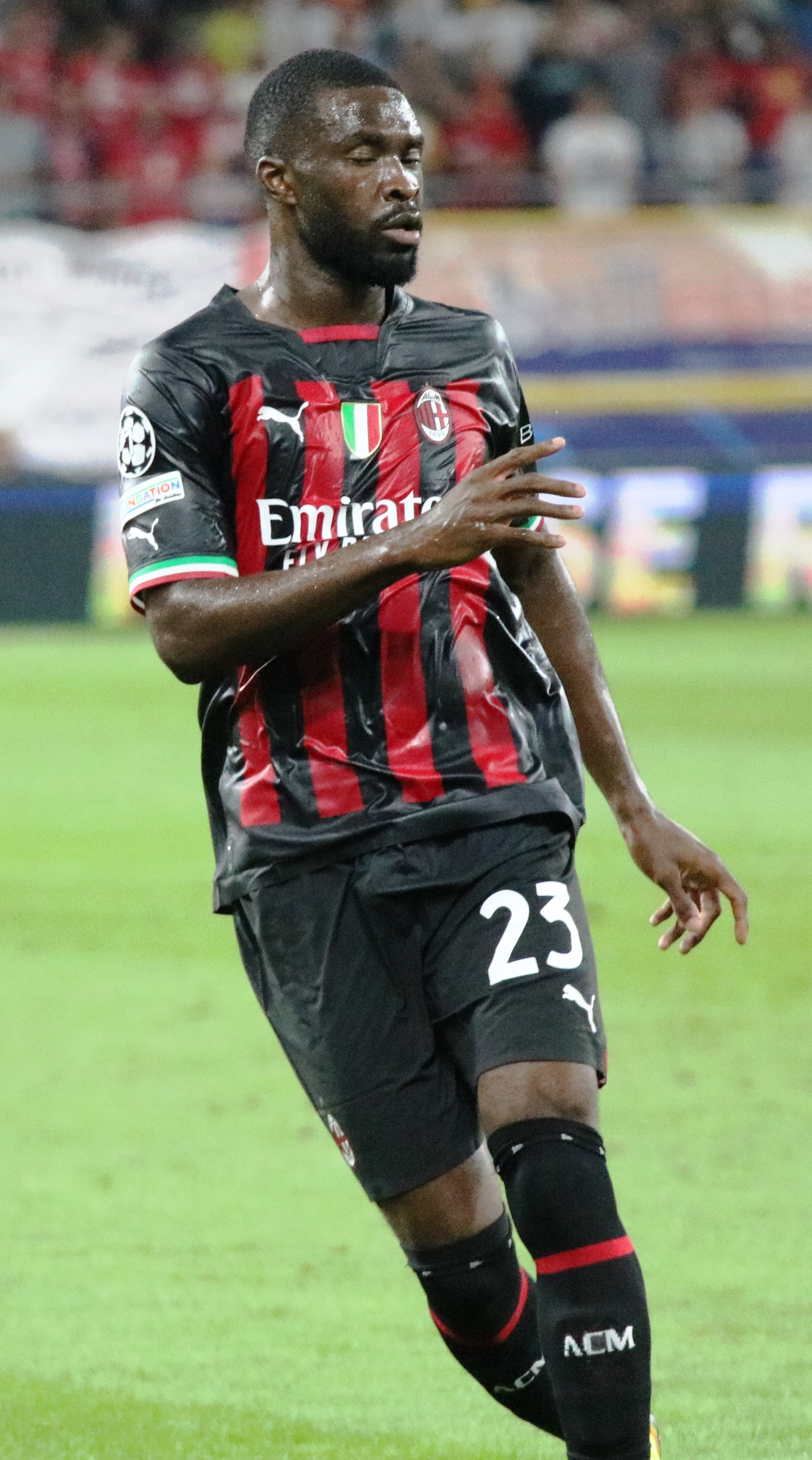
- Tomori playing for AC Milan in 2022

Personal information
- Full name: Oluwafikayomi Oluwadamilola Tomori
- Date of birth: 19 December 1997 (age 28)
- Place of birth: Calgary, Alberta, Canada
- Height: 6 ft 1 in (1.85 m)
- Positions: Centre-back; right-back

Team information
- Current team: AC Milan
- Number: 23

Youth career
- 2003–2005: Riverview United
- 2005–2016: Chelsea

Senior career*
Years	Team	Apps	(Gls)
2016–2021	Chelsea	17	(1)
2017	→ Brighton & Hove Albion (loan)	9	(0)
2017–2018	→ Hull City (loan)	25	(0)
2018–2019	→ Derby County (loan)	44	(1)
2021	→ AC Milan (loan)	17	(1)
2021–	AC Milan	148	(5)

International career^{‡}
2016	Canada U20	3	(0)
2016	England U19	5	(0)
2016–2017	England U20	15	(0)
2017–2019	England U21	15	(0)
2019–	England	6	(0)
Medal record
Men's Football
Representing England
FIFA U-20 World Cup
Winner	2017
- * Club domestic league appearances and goals as of 12:31, 28 October 2026 (UTC) ‡ National team caps and goals as of 22:19, 27 March 2026 (UTC)

Oluwafikayomi Oluwadamilola "Fikayo" Tomori (born 19 December 1997) is a professional footballer who plays as a centre-back and right-back for Serie A club AC Milan. Born in Canada, he represents the England national team.

A product of Chelsea's youth academy, Tomori made his senior debut in 2016. He subsequently spent time on loan in the Championship with Brighton & Hove Albion, Hull City, and Derby County, before returning to Chelsea's first team in 2019. In 2021, he was signed by AC Milan, with whom he won the Serie A title in 2022.

Having represented both Canada and England at youth level, Tomori made his senior debut for England in 2019.

== Early life ==
Oluwafikayomi Oluwadamilola Tomori was born on 19 December 1997 in Calgary, Alberta, Canada, to Nigerian parents. Before the age of one, Tomori moved with his family to England where he was raised. Tomori attended Gravesend Grammar School in Gravesham and he began his football career by playing for Riverview United in Kent when he was six. Growing up, his footballing idol was Thierry Henry.

== Club career ==
=== Chelsea ===
==== Youth career ====
Tomori joined the Chelsea Academy at under-eight level and progressed through the club's academy system. He was part of the Chelsea youth side which recorded back to back triumphs in both the UEFA Youth League and the FA Youth Cup in 2015 and 2016.

On 11 May 2016, Tomori was named to the first-team substitute bench along with fellow academy players Tammy Abraham and Kasey Palmer, in Chelsea's 1–1 draw with Liverpool. However, he failed to make an appearance at Anfield. On 15 May, in Chelsea's final game of the 2015–16 season, Tomori made his debut in a 1–1 draw with Premier League champions Leicester City, replacing Branislav Ivanović in the 60th minute. Although Tomori was included in the United States pre-season tour, he did not make a single appearance. On 1 August, Tomori signed a new four-year contract ahead of the 2016–17 season.

==== 2017–2019: Loans to Championship clubs ====
On 23 January 2017, Tomori joined Championship club Brighton & Hove Albion on loan for the remainder of the 2016–17 season. Five days later, Tomori made his Brighton debut in a 3–1 away defeat against National League team Lincoln City in the FA Cup fourth round, in which he scored an own goal to give Lincoln the lead. On 18 February 2017, Tomori made his league debut for Brighton, in their 2–0 away victory against Barnsley, replacing Anthony Knockaert in stoppage time of the second half. On 18 March 2017, Tomori was given his first start for Brighton in their 2–0 away defeat against Leeds United, featuring for the entire 90 minutes.

On 31 August 2017, Tomori joined Championship club Hull City on a season long loan deal. He made his debut on 13 September 2017, in a 2–1 defeat away to Fulham.

On 6 August 2018, Tomori joined Championship club Derby County on a season long loan. He made his debut on 11 August in a 4–1 loss against Leeds United. His time at the club saw him named the club's "Player of the Year".

==== 2019–20 season: First-team breakthrough ====
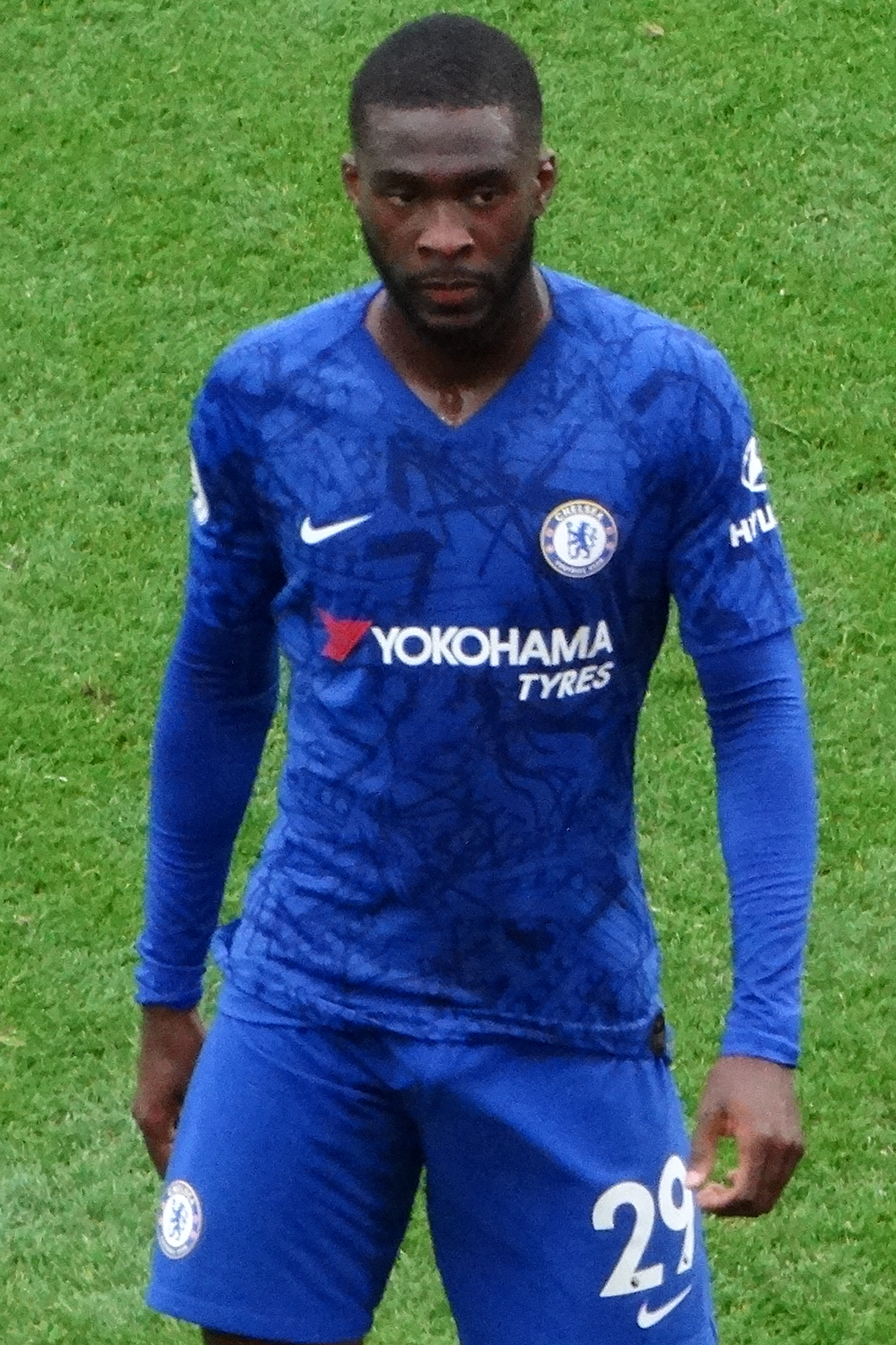
Tomori playing for Chelsea in 2019

On 31 August 2019, Tomori made his first start for Chelsea against Sheffield United, which ended a 2–2 draw at Stamford Bridge. He scored his first goal for Chelsea on 14 September, opening the scoring with long-range curling shot from outside the penalty area, in a 5–2 away win over Wolverhampton Wanderers. He scored a header against former club Hull City to help Chelsea to a 2–1 win in the fourth round of the FA Cup at the KCOM Stadium on 25 January 2020.

=== AC Milan ===
==== Loan spell ====
On 22 January 2021, Tomori joined Serie A club AC Milan on loan for the remainder of the 2020–21 season with an option to buy. Four days later, he made his debut in the Coppa Italia quarter-final against Inter Milan in the Derby della Madonnina, coming on as a substitute for the injured Simon Kjær in a 2–1 away defeat. On 9 May, Tomori scored his first goal for Milan in a 3–0 away league win over rivals Juventus. Tomori became the first Englishman to score for Milan since David Beckham in 2009 and it was the club's first away win against Juventus in the league since March 2011.

==== 2021–22 season ====
On 17 June 2021, Tomori signed a permanent deal with Milan until 30 June 2025, after the club exercised their £25m buy option from his previous loan. He scored his first goal of the season on 7 December, against Liverpool in a Champions League match which Milan lost 2–1. With his teammate Simon Kjær out of action for the remainder of the season due to injury, Tomori became a regular in the starting line-up. On 12 March 2022, as Milan won 1–0 against Empoli, they managed to secure two clean sheets in a row for the first time in 2022, courtesy of Tomori partnering in defence with Pierre Kalulu. Tomori ended his first full season in Italy as a Serie A champion, as Milan won its first Scudetto in 11 years with the best defensive record in the division. In October 2022, he was one of two central defenders named in the 2021–22 Serie A Team of the Year by the Italian Footballers' Association.

==== 2022–23 season ====
On 12 August 2022, Tomori signed a new contract with Milan until June 2027. He scored his first goal of the 2022–23 season in a 2–0 win over Juventus on 8 October 2022. Three days later, he was sent off for the first time in his career in Milan's 2–0 home loss to his former club Chelsea in the group stage of the UEFA Champions League.

On 8 March 2023, he was named man of the match in the Champions League round of 16 second leg away match against Tottenham Hotspur, which ended in a 0–0 draw and qualification to the quarter-final for the first time in eleven years for Milan, by winning 1–0 on aggregate. Milan eventually reached the semi-finals of the competition for the first time since winning the competition in the 2006–07 season but were knocked out 3–0 on aggregate by city rivals Inter.

==== 2023–24 ====
Tomori received the second red card of his Milan career when he was sent off for two bookable offences in a 2–1 win at Roma on 1 September 2023. He scored his first goal of the season in a 3–1 win at Cagliari on 27 September.

== International career ==
=== Canada ===
On 27 March 2016, Tomori captained Canada U20 to a 2–1 victory over England U20 on his third appearance for the nation.

=== England ===
==== Youth ====
On 16 May 2016, in the next international break and a day after making his professional club debut, Tomori was called up to the England U19 squad. On 4 June, Tomori made his England U19 debut in a 2–0 defeat against Mexico U20s, playing the full 90 minutes. Tomori was also part of the England 2016 UEFA European Under-19 Championship squad which reached the semi-finals before being knocked out by Italy.

Tomori was selected for the England under-20 team in the 2017 FIFA U-20 World Cup. Tomori however scored an own goal in England's second group game against Guinea. Nevertheless, Tomori would help England beat Venezuela in the final 1–0, which was England's first win in a global tournament since their World Cup victory of 1966.

On 27 May 2019, Tomori was included in England's 23-man squad for the 2019 UEFA European Under-21 Championship. He started in all three matches as England were knocked out in the group stage.

==== Senior ====
On 3 October 2019, Tomori received his first call-up to the England senior squad for Euro 2020 qualifying matches against Czechia and Bulgaria. He later said he was committed to playing for England, following interest from Nigeria and Canada; he had previously represented Canada at youth level. Tomori made his debut for England on 17 November against Kosovo in a Euro 2020 qualifier.

After being absent from the squad for almost two years, Tomori was recalled for England's 2022 FIFA World Cup qualifiers against Andorra and Hungary in October 2021. He won his second cap as a second-half substitute for John Stones in the 5–0 win over Andorra on 9 October.

On 11 June 2022, Tomori made his first start for England in a 2022–23 UEFA Nations League fixture against Italy.

Tomori was not selected for the 2022 FIFA World Cup and was absent from the England squad until his recall for the September 2023 internationals, where he was an unused substitute against Ukraine and Scotland. On 13 October 2023, he made his first international appearance in 16 months, starting as a left-back in England's 1–0 friendly win over Australia at Wembley Stadium.

== Style of play ==
Tomori is known for his fast running and hard tackling. Confident in possession and comfortable with the ball at both of his feet, he can play in most defensive positions of different formations. While usually a centre-back on the right side, he regularly plays on the left side as well, due to his ability with the left foot. On a few occasions, he also played as a full-back on either side of the pitch, both on club and national team levels. However, his primary position still remains in central defense, preferably in a high defensive line. Although not known as a long passer, he can quickly and accurately pass the ball to teammates in the team's own half on the pitch in attempts to either organize an attack or continue to keep possession of the ball. Standing at 1.85 m (6 ft 1 in), an average height for a central defender, he often comes out as a winner in aerial duels, courtesy of his jumping and heading abilities, which led him to score several goals following set-pieces like free kicks and corner kicks.

== Personal life ==
In July 2021, Tomori completed a degree in Business Management through the Open University.

== Career statistics ==
=== Club ===
As of match played 28 October 2026

Appearances and goals by club, season and competition
Club	Season	League			National cup (Note: Includes FA Cup, Coppa Italia)		League cup (Note: Includes EFL Cup)		Europe		Other		Total	
Club	Season	Division	Apps	Goals	Apps	Goals	Apps	Goals	Apps	Goals	Apps	Goals	Apps	Goals
Chelsea	2015–16	Premier League	1	0	0	0	0	0	0	0	0	0	1	0
Chelsea	2019–20	Premier League	15	1	2	1	0	0	4 (Note: Appearances in UEFA Champions League)	0	1 (Note: Appearance in UEFA Super Cup)	0	22	2
Chelsea	2020–21	Premier League	1	0	1	0	2	0	0	0	—		4	0
Chelsea	Total		17	1	3	1	2	0	4	0	1	0	27	2
Chelsea U23	2016–17	—			—		—		—		2 (Note: Appearances in EFL Trophy)	0	2	0
Brighton & Hove Albion (loan)	2016–17	Championship	9	0	1	0	—		—		—		10	0
Hull City (loan)	2017–18	Championship	25	0	1	0	—		—		—		26	0
Derby County (loan)	2018–19	Championship	44	1	4	0	4	1	—		3 (Note: Appearances in Championship play-offs)	0	55	2
AC Milan (loan)	2020–21	Serie A	17	1	1	0	—		4 (Note: Appearances in UEFA Europa League)	0	—		22	1
AC Milan	2021–22	Serie A	31	0	4	0	—		5	1	—		40	1
AC Milan	2022–23	Serie A	33	1	1	0	—		10	0	1 (Note: Appearance(s) in Supercoppa Italiana)	0	45	1
AC Milan	2023–24	Serie A	26	4	0	0	—		9 (Note: Six appearances in UEFA Champions League, three appearances in UEFA Europa League)	0	—		35	4
AC Milan	2024–25	Serie A	22	0	4	0	—		7	0	2	0	35	0
AC Milan	2025–26	Serie A	33	0	3	0	—		—		1	0	37	0
AC Milan	2026–27	Serie A	3	0	0	0	—		2	0	—		5	0
AC Milan	Milan total		165	6	13	0	—		37	1	4	0	219	7
Career total			260	8	22	1	6	1	41	1	10	0	339	11

=== International ===
As of match played 27 March 2026

Appearances and goals by national team and year
National team	Year	Apps	Goals
England	2019	1	0
England	2020	0	0
England	2021	1	0
England	2022	1	0
England	2023	2	0
England	2024	0	0
England	2025	0	0
England	2026	1	0
Total		6	0

== Honours ==
Chelsea Youth

- FA Youth Cup: 2014–15, 2015–16
- UEFA Youth League: 2014–15, 2015–16

Chelsea

- FA Cup runner-up: 2019–20

AC Milan

- Serie A: 2021–22
- Supercoppa Italiana: 2024–25

England U20

- FIFA U-20 World Cup: 2017

England U21

- Toulon Tournament: 2018

Individual

- UEFA European Under-19 Championship Team of the Tournament: 2016
- Chelsea Academy Player of the Year: 2016
- Derby County Player of the Year: 2018–19
- Chelsea Goal of the Season: 2019–20
- Serie A Team of the Year: 2021–22

== See also ==
- List of England international footballers born outside England
