= Alex Beard (businessman) =

British businessman (born 1967)

- Born: Alexander Frank Beard; 3 August 1967 (age 59)
- Education: Christ Church, Oxford University
- Occupation: Businessman
- Children: 3

Alexander Frank Beard (born 3 August 1967) is a British billionaire businessman, based in London. He is chairman and founding shareholder of Adaptogen Capital, a London-based infrastructure firm. Established in 2020, the firm is focused on building a portfolio of storage batteries across the UK that will provide stability to the grid and storage capacity.

Beard was formerly CEO of Glencore's worldwide oil operations, one of the world's largest commodity trading and mining companies. In June 2019, it was announced he would retire after 24 years with the company.

== Early life ==
Beard attended Gravesend Grammar School for Boys between 1980 and 1985. He studied at Christ Church, Oxford University in 1985 and graduated with an MA in Biochemistry in 1989.

== Career ==
Beard joined BP as a graduate and worked there as an oil trader from 1990–94. He joined Glencore in 1995 as a trader in Russia and FSU and took over responsibility for all trading in those areas. In 2007, he was appointed as CEO of Glencore's worldwide oil department.

During his tenure Glencore substantially increased their global business to trade over 5Mb per day of crude and products. Beard also created the RussNeft joint venture for production in Russia as well as invested in shipping, refining and storage assets.

In June 2019, it was announced Beard would step down as the head of Glencore's oil division.

Beard was charged in 2024 with two conspiracies to make corrupt payments to government officials and officials of state-owned oil companies in Nigeria between 2010 and 2014 and in Cameroon between 2007 and 2014, by the U.K.'s Serious Fraud Office.

According to Forbes, he is worth $2.3 billion.

His new investment fund, Adaptogen Capital is focused on building a portfolio of at least 800MW of strategic storage batteries across the UK to provide stability for the UK grid as the supply of renewable energy increases. Other ventures include being a Sponsor of Energy Transition Partners (ENTP), a Special Purpose Acquisition Company, created with the purpose of acquiring a business operating in the energy transition sector.

== Personal life ==
Beard is married, has three children and lives in London.

He endowed a £6m fund at Christ Church which funds income support for undergraduates as part of the Oxford University Bursary Scheme and was made an honorary student of Christ Church in 2012. He was also a donor to the Royal Marsden Oak Cancer Centre. He joined the board of trustees for Shakespeare's Globe in London in 2017, becoming Deputy Chairman in 2019 before stepping down in 2022.
