= Portugal at the FIFA World Cup =

International football delegation

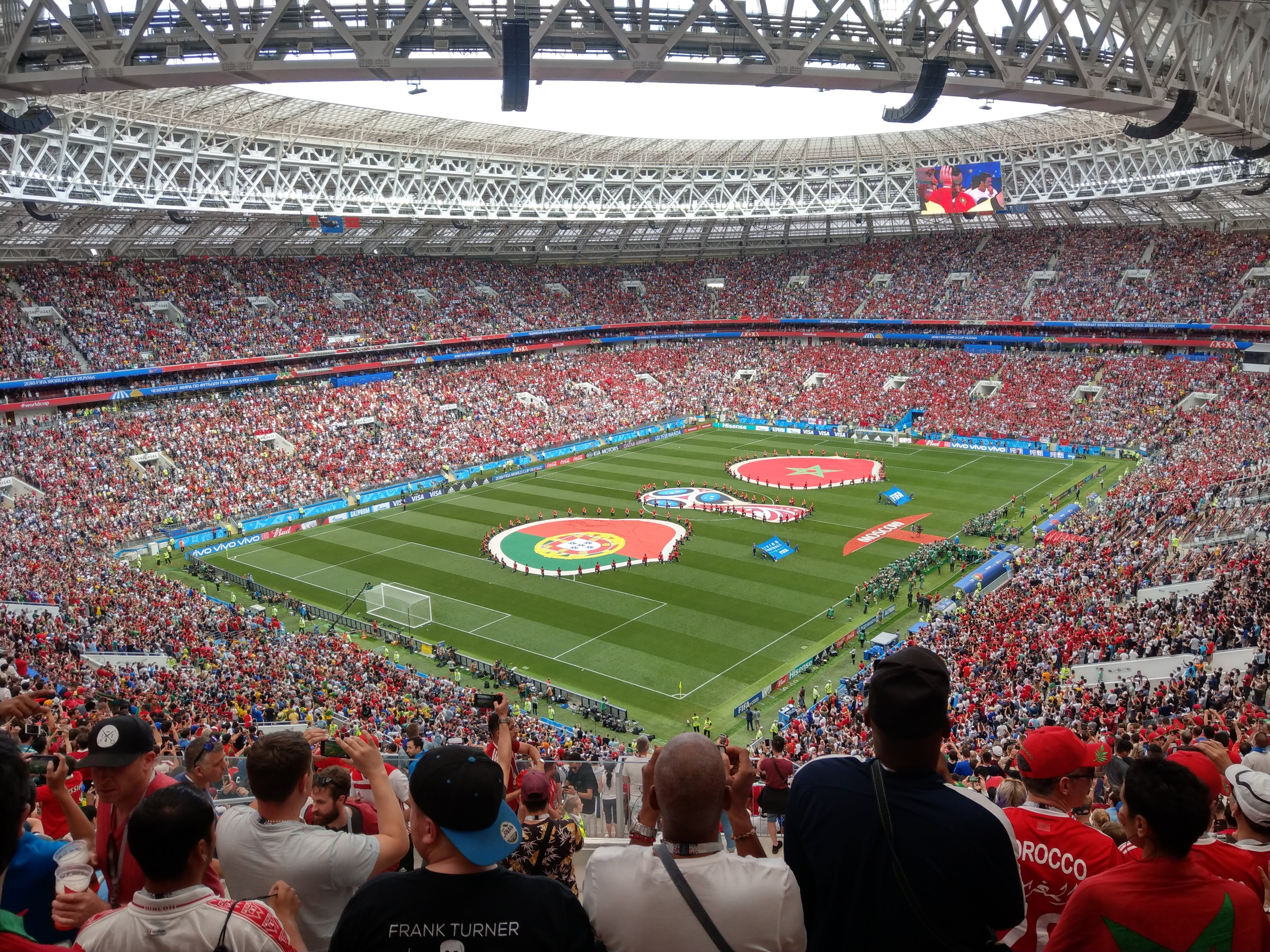
Portugal vs Morocco match at the 2018 World Cup in Russia

The FIFA World Cup has two international association football competitions, one contested by the men's national teams of the members of Fédération Internationale de Football Association (FIFA), the sport's global governing body. The men's championship has been organized every four years since the first tournament in 1930, except in 1942 and 1946, due to World War II, and the women's started in 1991.

The tournament consists of two parts, the qualification phase and the final phase (officially called the World Cup Finals). The qualification phase, which currently take place over the three years preceding the Finals, is used to determine which teams qualify for the Finals. The current format of the finals involves 48 teams competing for the title, at venues within the host nation/nations) over a period of about a month. The World Cup final is the most widely viewed sporting event in the world, with an estimated 715.1 million people watching the 2006 tournament final.

Portugal have qualified for the final phase of the FIFA World Cup on nine occasions: in 1966, 1986, 2002 and every final phase held since. Their best performance, as of 2026, is a third place finish in 1966; they also finished fourth in 2006. Portugal is set to co-host the 2030 edition having been granted host status alongside Morocco and Spain.

== FIFA World Cup record ==
| Year | Round | Position | Pld | W | D | L | GF | GA |
|---|---|---|---|---|---|---|---|---|
| (Uruguay) 1930 | Did not enter | | | | | | | |
| (Italy) 1934 | Did not qualify | | | | | | | |
| (France) 1938 | Did not qualify | | | | | | | |
| (Brazil) 1950 | Did not qualify | | | | | | | |
| (Switzerland) 1954 | Did not qualify | | | | | | | |
| (Sweden) 1958 | Did not qualify | | | | | | | |
| (Chile) 1962 | Did not qualify | | | | | | | |
| (England) 1966 | Third place | 3rd | 6 | 5 | 0 | 1 | 17 | 8 |
| (Mexico) 1970 | Did not qualify | | | | | | | |
| (West Germany) 1974 | Did not qualify | | | | | | | |
| (Argentina) 1978 | Did not qualify | | | | | | | |
| (Spain) 1982 | Did not qualify | | | | | | | |
| (Mexico) 1986 | Group stage | 17th | 3 | 1 | 0 | 2 | 2 | 4 |
| (Italy) 1990 | Did not qualify | | | | | | | |
| (United States) 1994 | Did not qualify | | | | | | | |
| (France) 1998 | Did not qualify | | | | | | | |
| (South Korea) (Japan) 2002 | Group stage | 21st | 3 | 1 | 0 | 2 | 6 | 4 |
| (Germany) 2006 | Fourth place | 4th | 7 | 4 | 1 | 2 | 7 | 5 |
| (South Africa) 2010 | Round of 16 | 11th | 4 | 1 | 2 | 1 | 7 | 1 |
| (Brazil) 2014 | Group stage | 18th | 3 | 1 | 1 | 1 | 4 | 7 |
| (Russia) 2018 | Round of 16 | 13th | 4 | 1 | 2 | 1 | 6 | 6 |
| (Qatar) 2022 | Quarter-finals | 8th | 5 | 3 | 0 | 2 | 12 | 6 |
| (Canada) (Mexico) (United States) 2026 | Round of 16 | 13th | 5 | 2 | 2 | 1 | 8 | 3 |
| (Morocco) (Portugal) (Spain) 2030 | Qualified as co-hosts | | | | | | | |
| (Saudi Arabia) 2034 | To be determined | | | | | | | |
| Total | 9/23 | 3rd | 40 | 19 | 8 | 13 | 69 | 44 |

Note: Draws include knockout matches decided via penalty shoot-out.

Portugal's World Cup record
| First Match | Portugal 3–1 Hungary (13 July 1966; Manchester, England) |
| Biggest Win | Portugal 7–0 North Korea (21 June 2010; Cape Town, South Africa) |
| Biggest Defeat | Germany 4–0 Portugal (16 June 2014; Salvador, Brazil) |
| Best Result | Third place in 1966 |
| Worst Result | Group stage in 1986, 2002 and 2014 |

== By match ==
| Year | Round | Opponent | Score | Portugal scorers |
|---|---|---|---|---|
| (England) 1966 | Group 3 | Hungary | 3–1 | José Augusto (2), Torres |
| (England) 1966 | Group 3 | Bulgaria | 3–0 | Vustov (o.g.), Eusébio, Torres |
| (England) 1966 | Group 3 | Brazil | 3–1 | Simões, Eusébio (2) |
| (England) 1966 | Quarter-final | North Korea | 5–3 | Eusébio (4), José Augusto |
| (England) 1966 | Semi-final | England | 1–2 | Eusébio |
| (England) 1966 | Match for third place | Soviet Union | 2–1 | Eusébio, Torres |
| (Mexico) 1986 | Group F | England | 1–0 | Carlos Manuel |
| (Mexico) 1986 | Group F | Poland | 0–1 | — |
| (Mexico) 1986 | Group F | Morocco | 1–3 | Diamantino |
| (South Korea) (Japan) 2002 | Group D | United States | 2–3 | Beto, Agoos (o.g.) |
| (South Korea) (Japan) 2002 | Group D | Poland | 4–0 | Pauleta (3), Rui Costa |
| (South Korea) (Japan) 2002 | Group D | South Korea | 0–1 | — |
| (Germany) 2006 | Group D | Angola | 1–0 | Pauleta |
| (Germany) 2006 | Group D | Iran | 2–0 | Deco, Ronaldo |
| (Germany) 2006 | Group D | Mexico | 2–1 | Maniche, Simão |
| (Germany) 2006 | Round of 16 | Netherlands | 1–0 | Maniche |
| (Germany) 2006 | Quarter-final | England | 0–0 (a.e.t.) (3–1 p) | — |
| (Germany) 2006 | Semi-final | France | 0–1 | — |
| (Germany) 2006 | Match for third place | Germany | 1–3 | Nuno Gomes |
| (South Africa) 2010 | Group G | Ivory Coast | 0–0 | — |
| (South Africa) 2010 | Group G | North Korea | 7–0 | Meireles, Simão, Almeida, Tiago (2), Liédson, Ronaldo |
| (South Africa) 2010 | Group G | Brazil | 0–0 | — |
| (South Africa) 2010 | Round of 16 | Spain | 0–1 | — |
| (Brazil) 2014 | Group G | Germany | 0–4 | — |
| (Brazil) 2014 | Group G | United States | 2–2 | Nani, Varela |
| (Brazil) 2014 | Group G | Ghana | 2–1 | Boye (o.g.), Ronaldo |
| (Russia) 2018 | Group B | Spain | 3–3 | Ronaldo (3) |
| (Russia) 2018 | Group B | Morocco | 1–0 | Ronaldo |
| (Russia) 2018 | Group B | Iran | 1–1 | Quaresma |
| (Russia) 2018 | Round of 16 | Uruguay | 1–2 | Pepe |
| (Qatar) 2022 | Group H | Ghana | 3–2 | Ronaldo, Félix, Leão |
| (Qatar) 2022 | Group H | Uruguay | 2–0 | Fernandes (2) |
| (Qatar) 2022 | Group H | South Korea | 1–2 | Horta |
| (Qatar) 2022 | Round of 16 | Switzerland | 6–1 | Ramos (3), Pepe, Guerreiro, Leão |
| (Qatar) 2022 | Quarter-final | Morocco | 0–1 | — |
| (Canada) (Mexico) (United States) 2026 | Group K | DR Congo | 1–1 | J. Neves |
| (Canada) (Mexico) (United States) 2026 | Group K | Uzbekistan | 5–0 | Ronaldo (2), Mendes, Nematov (o.g.), Leão |
| (Canada) (Mexico) (United States) 2026 | Group K | Colombia | 0–0 | — |
| (Canada) (Mexico) (United States) 2026 | Round of 32 | Croatia | 2–1 | Ronaldo, Ramos |
| (Canada) (Mexico) (United States) 2026 | Round of 16 | Spain | 0–1 | — |
| (Morocco) (Portugal) (Spain) 2030 | TBA | TBA | v | |

== Portugal in Qatar 2022 ==
=== Group stage ===
| Pos | Team | Pld | W | D | L | GF | GA | GD | Pts | Qualification |
|---|---|---|---|---|---|---|---|---|---|---|
| 1 | Portugal | 3 | 2 | 0 | 1 | 6 | 4 | +2 | 6 | Advanced to knockout stage |
| 2 | South Korea | 3 | 1 | 1 | 1 | 4 | 4 | 0 | 4 | Advanced to knockout stage |
| 3 | Uruguay | 3 | 1 | 1 | 1 | 2 | 2 | 0 | 4 | |
| 4 | Ghana | 3 | 1 | 0 | 2 | 5 | 7 | −2 | 3 | |

Source: FIFA
Rules for classification: Group stage tiebreakers
24 November 2022
19:00

| Portugal | 3–2 | Ghana |
|---|---|---|
| Ronaldo 65' (pen.); Félix 78'; Leão 80' | | A. Ayew 73'; Bukari 89' |

Stadium 974, Doha
Attendance: 42,662
Referee: Ismail Elfath (United States)
28 November 2022
22:00

| Portugal | 2–0 | Uruguay |
|---|---|---|
| Fernandes 54', 90+3' (pen.) |

Lusail Stadium, Lusail
Attendance: 88,668
Referee: Alireza Faghani (Iran)
2 December 2022
18:00

| South Korea | 2–1 | Portugal |
|---|---|---|
| Kim Young-gwon 27'; Hwang Hee-chan 90+1' | | Horta 5' |

Education City Stadium, Al Rayyan
Attendance: 44,097
Referee: Facundo Tello (Argentina)

=== Knockout stage ===
==== Round of 16 ====
6 December 2022
22:00

| Portugal | 6–1 | Switzerland |
|---|---|---|
| Ramos 17', 51', 67'; Pepe 33'; Guerreiro 55'; Leão 90+2' | | Akanji 58' |

Lusail Stadium, Lusail
Attendance: 83,720
Referee: César Arturo Ramos (Mexico)

==== Quarter-finals ====
10 December 2022
18:00

| Morocco | 1–0 | Portugal |
|---|---|---|
| En-Nesyri 42' |

Al Thumama Stadium, Doha
Attendance: 44,198
Referee: Facundo Tello (Argentina)

== Portugal in North America 2026 ==
=== Group stage ===
| Pos | Team | Pld | W | D | L | GF | GA | GD | Pts | Qualification |
|---|---|---|---|---|---|---|---|---|---|---|
| 1 | Colombia | 3 | 2 | 1 | 0 | 4 | 1 | +3 | 7 | Advance to knockout stage |
| 2 | Portugal | 3 | 1 | 2 | 0 | 6 | 1 | +5 | 5 | Advance to knockout stage |
| 3 | DR Congo | 3 | 1 | 1 | 1 | 4 | 3 | +1 | 4 | Advance to knockout stage |
| 4 | Uzbekistan | 3 | 0 | 0 | 3 | 2 | 11 | −9 | 0 | |

Source: FIFA
Rules for classification: Group stage tiebreakers
June 17, 2026
12:00 p.m. UTC−5

| Portugal | 1–1 | DR Congo |
|---|---|---|
| J. Neves 6' | (Note: "Portugal vs Congo DR | First Stage | FIFA World Cup 2026". FIFA. Retrieved June 17, 2026.; "Match Report – Group K – Portugal v. Congo DR". FIFA. June 17, 2026. Retrieved June 17, 2026.; "Post match summary report – Group K – Portugal v. Congo DR". FIFA. June 17, 2026. Retrieved June 19, 2026.) | Wissa 45+5' |

NRG Stadium, Houston
Attendance: 68,777
Referee: Abdulrahman Al-Jassim (Qatar)

June 23, 2026
12:00 p.m. UTC−5

| Portugal | 5–0 | Uzbekistan |
|---|---|---|
| Ronaldo 6', 39'; Mendes 17'; Nematov 60' (o.g.); Leão 87' | (Note: "Portugal vs Uzbekistan | First Stage | FIFA World Cup 2026". FIFA. Retrieved June 23, 2026.; "Match Report – Group K – Portugal v. Uzbekistan". FIFA. June 23, 2026. Retrieved June 23, 2026.; "Post match summary report – Group K – Portugal v. Uzbekistan". FIFA. June 23, 2026. Retrieved June 25, 2026.) |

NRG Stadium, Houston
Attendance: 68,777
Referee: Jalal Jayed (Morocco)

June 27, 2026
7:30 p.m. UTC−4

| Colombia | 0–0 | Portugal |
|---|---|---|
| | (Note: "Colombia vs Portugal | First Stage | FIFA World Cup 2026". FIFA. Retrieved June 28, 2026.; "Match Report – Group K – Colombia v. Portugal". FIFA. June 28, 2026. Retrieved June 28, 2026.; "Post match summary report – Group K – Colombia v. Portugal". FIFA. June 28, 2026. Retrieved June 28, 2026.) |

Hard Rock Stadium, Miami Gardens
Attendance: 64,478
Referee: Alireza Faghani (Australia)

=== Knockout stage ===
Round of 32

July 2, 2026
7:00 p.m. UTC−4

| Portugal | 2–1 | Croatia |
|---|---|---|
| Ronaldo 68' (pen.); Ramos 90+4' | (Note: "Portugal vs Croatia | Round of 32 | FIFA World Cup 2026". FIFA. Retrieved July 3, 2026.; "Match Report – Round of 32 – Portugal v. Croatia". FIFA. July 3, 2026. Retrieved July 3, 2026.; "Post match summary report – Round of 32 – Portugal v. Croatia". FIFA. July 2, 2026. Retrieved July 3, 2026.) | Perišić 53' |

BMO Field, Toronto
Attendance: 43,036
Referee: Espen Eskås (Norway)

Round of 16

July 6, 2026
2:00 p.m. UTC−5

| Portugal | 0–1 | Spain |
|---|---|---|
| | (Note: "Portugal vs Spain | Round of 16 | FIFA World Cup 2026". FIFA. Retrieved July 6, 2026.; "Match Report – Round of 16 – Portugal v. Spain". FIFA. July 6, 2026. Retrieved July 6, 2026.; "Post match summary report – Round of 16 – Portugal v. Spain". FIFA. July 6, 2026. Retrieved July 7, 2026.) | Merino 90+1' |

AT&T Stadium, Arlington
Attendance: 70,649
Referee: Anthony Taylor (England)

== Most appearances ==
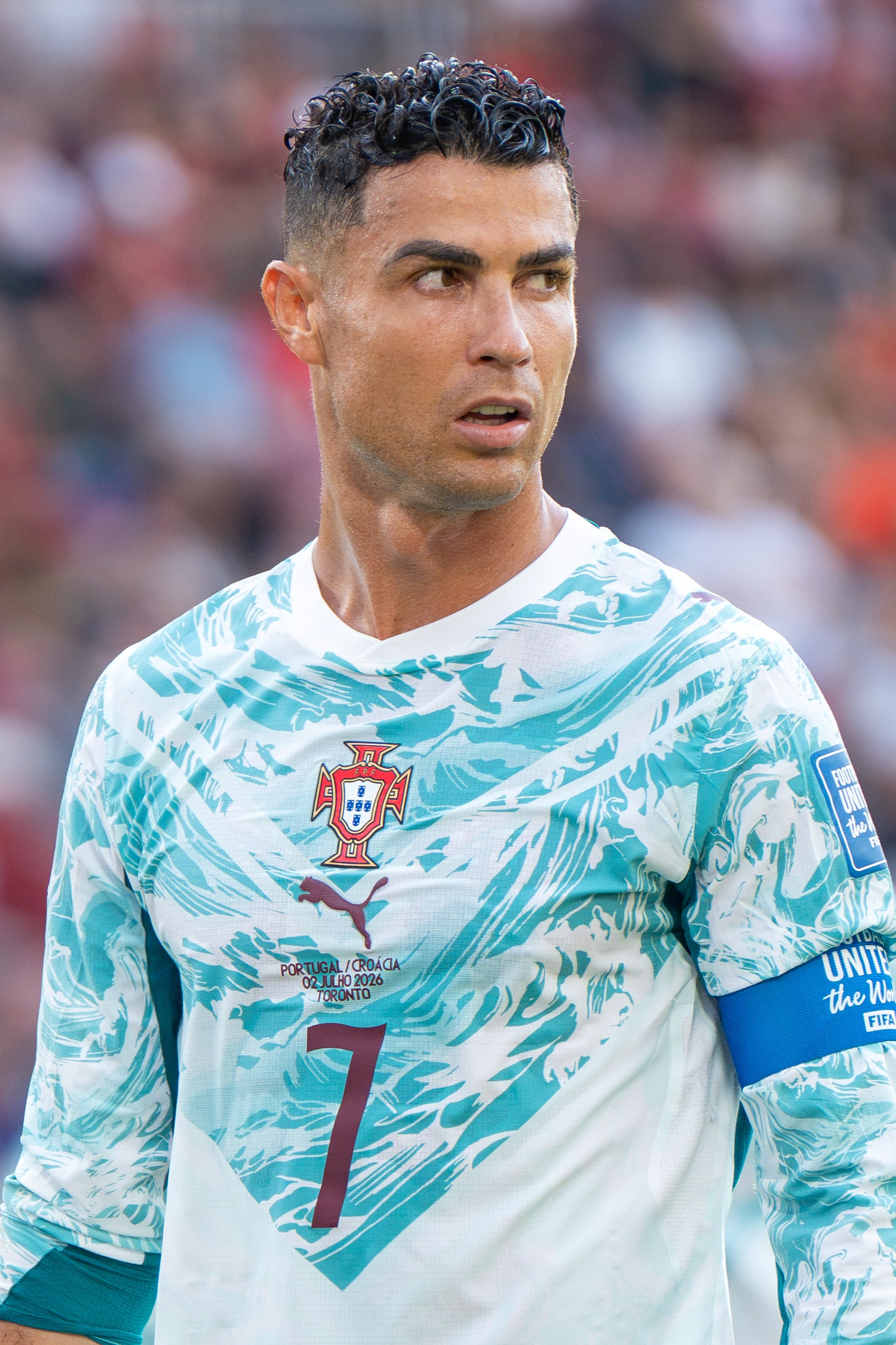
Cristiano Ronaldo has played in a record 27 matches and six tournaments for Portugal at the World Cup.

| Rank | Player | Matches | World Cups |
|---|---|---|---|
| 1 | Cristiano Ronaldo | 27 | 2006, 2010, 2014, 2018, 2022 and 2026 |
| 2 | Bernardo Silva | 13 | 2018, 2022 and 2026 |
| 3 | Pepe | 12 | 2010, 2014, 2018 and 2022 |
| 4 | Simão | 11 | 2006 and 2010 |
| 4 | Bruno Fernandes | 11 | 2018, 2022 and 2026 |
| 6 | Luís Figo | 10 | 2002 and 2006 |
| 6 | Ricardo Carvalho | 10 | 2006 and 2010 |
| 6 | William Carvalho | 10 | 2014, 2018 and 2022 |
| 6 | Diogo Costa | 10 | 2022 and 2026 |
| 6 | Rafael Leão | 10 | 2022 and 2026 |

== Goalscorers ==
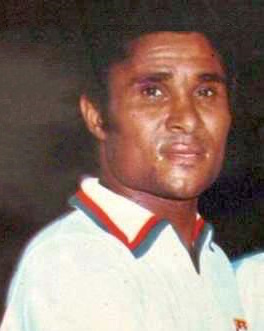
Eusébio scored nine goals at the 1966 World Cup, the most in a single edition by a Portuguese player.

Eusebio's nine goals at the 1966 FIFA World Cup made him that tournament's top goalscorer, which also won him the Bronze Ball.

| Player | Goals | 1966 | 1986 | 2002 | 2006 | 2010 | 2014 | 2018 | 2022 | 2026 |
|---|---|---|---|---|---|---|---|---|---|---|
| Cristiano Ronaldo | 11 | | | | 1 | 1 | 1 | 4 | 1 | 3 |
| Eusébio | 9 | 9 | | | | | | | | |
| Pauleta | 4 | | | 3 | 1 | | | | | |
| Gonçalo Ramos | 4 | | | | | | | | 3 | 1 |
| José Torres | 3 | 3 | | | | | | | | |
| José Augusto | 3 | 3 | | | | | | | | |
| Rafael Leão | 3 | | | | | | | | 2 | 1 |
| Bruno Fernandes | 2 | | | | | | | | 2 | |
| Maniche | 2 | | | | 2 | | | | | |
| Pepe | 2 | | | | | | | 1 | 1 | |
| Simão | 2 | | | | 1 | 1 | | | | |
| Tiago | 2 | | | | | 2 | | | | |
| António Simões | 1 | 1 | | | | | | | | |
| Beto | 1 | | | 1 | | | | | | |
| Carlos Manuel | 1 | | 1 | | | | | | | |
| Rui Costa | 1 | | | 1 | | | | | | |
| Deco | 1 | | | | 1 | | | | | |
| Diamantino | 1 | | 1 | | | | | | | |
| Hugo Almeida | 1 | | | | | 1 | | | | |
| João Félix | 1 | | | | | | | | 1 | |
| Liédson | 1 | | | | | 1 | | | | |
| Raul Meireles | 1 | | | | | 1 | | | | |
| Nani | 1 | | | | | | 1 | | | |
| Nuno Gomes | 1 | | | | 1 | | | | | |
| Raphaël Guerreiro | 1 | | | | | | | | 1 | |
| Ricardo Horta | 1 | | | | | | | | 1 | |
| Ricardo Quaresma | 1 | | | | | | | 1 | | |
| João Neves | 1 | | | | | | | | | 1 |
| Nuno Mendes | 1 | | | | | | | | | 1 |
| Silvestre Varela | 1 | | | | | | 1 | | | |
| Own goals | 4 | 1 | | 1 | | | 1 | | | 1 |
| Total | 69 | 17 | 2 | 6 | 7 | 7 | 4 | 6 | 12 | 8 |

Own goals scored for opponents

- Jorge Costa (scored for United States in 2002)
- Petit (scored for Germany in 2006)

== See also ==
- Portugal at the FIFA Confederations Cup
- Portugal at the UEFA European Championship
- Portugal in the UEFA Nations League
