= Portugal in the UEFA Nations League =

Football results

In September 2018, the UEFA Nations League starring all European nations officially commenced. This competition has been created to make the international breaks more competitive and interesting and remove as much friendly matches as possible. The teams are divided into four leagues of four groups, from League A to League D. The winners and runners-up of each group from League A get to play the two-legged quarter-finals, whose winners advance to the Finals, constituted of the semi-finals, a third-place play-off, and the final.

Since the first season, Portugal has always remained in League A, the highest level of this competition. Portugal is the first ever winner of the UEFA Nations League, topping their group against Italy and Poland, knocking out Switzerland in the semi-finals and beating the Netherlands in the final on home soil. They couldn't retain the trophy in the next season after finishing second to France in the group stage. Portugal won a second title in the 2024–25 edition, again topping their group before defeating Denmark over two legs in the quarter-finals, Germany in the semi-finals, and then winning on penalties against Spain in the final, held in Munich.

== UEFA Nations League record ==
UEFA Nations League record
Season**	Division	Group	Pld	W	D*	L	GF	GA	P/R	Rank
(Portugal) 2018–19	A	3	6	4	2	0	9	4	Same position	1st
(Italy) 2020–21	A	3	6	4	1	1	12	4	Same position	5th
(Netherlands) 2022–23	A	2	6	3	1	2	11	3	Same position	6th
(Germany) 2024–25	A	1	10	6	3	1	22	11	Same position	1st
2026–27	A	4	In progress							
Total			28	17	7	4	54	22	2 Titles	

*Draws include knockout matches decided via penalty shoot-out.
**Group stage and quarter-finals played home and away. Flag shown represents host nation for the finals stage. Red border colour indicates the finals stage was held on home soil.

== List of matches ==
Season	Round	Opponent	Score	Result	Venue	Portugal scorers
(Europe) (Portugal) 2018–19	Group stage					
(Europe) (Portugal) 2018–19	Group stage	Italy	1–0	W	Lisbon	A. Silva
(Europe) (Portugal) 2018–19	Group stage	Poland	2–3	W	Chorzów	A. Silva, Glik (o.g.), B. Silva
(Europe) (Portugal) 2018–19	Group stage	Italy	0–0	D	Milan	—
(Europe) (Portugal) 2018–19	Group stage	Poland	1–1	D	Guimarães	A. Silva
(Europe) (Portugal) 2018–19	Semi-final	Switzerland	3–1	W	Porto	Ronaldo (3)
(Europe) (Portugal) 2018–19	Final	Netherlands	1–0	W	Porto	Guedes
(Europe) (Italy) 2020–21	Group stage					
(Europe) (Italy) 2020–21	Group stage	Croatia	4–1	W	Porto	Cancelo, Jota, Félix, A. Silva
(Europe) (Italy) 2020–21	Group stage	Sweden	2–0	W	Solna	Ronaldo (2)
(Europe) (Italy) 2020–21	Group stage	France	0–0	D	Saint-Denis	—
(Europe) (Italy) 2020–21	Group stage	Sweden	3–0	W	Lisbon	B. Silva, Jota (2)
(Europe) (Italy) 2020–21	Group stage	France	0–1	L	Lisbon	—
(Europe) (Italy) 2020–21	Group stage	Croatia	3–2	W	Split	Dias (2), Félix
(Europe) (Netherlands) 2022–23	Group stage					
(Europe) (Netherlands) 2022–23	Group stage	Spain	1–1	D	Seville	Horta
(Europe) (Netherlands) 2022–23	Group stage	Switzerland	4–0	W	Lisbon	Carvalho, Ronaldo (2), Cancelo
(Europe) (Netherlands) 2022–23	Group stage	Czech Republic	2–0	W	Lisbon	Cancelo, Guedes
(Europe) (Netherlands) 2022–23	Group stage	Switzerland	0–1	L	Geneva	—
(Europe) (Netherlands) 2022–23	Group stage	Czech Republic	4–0	W	Prague	Dalot (2), Fernandes, Jota
(Europe) (Netherlands) 2022–23	Group stage	Spain	0–1	L	Braga	—
(Europe) (Germany) 2024–25	Group stage					
(Europe) (Germany) 2024–25	Group stage	Croatia	2–1	W	Lisbon	Dalot, Ronaldo
(Europe) (Germany) 2024–25	Group stage	Scotland	2–1	W	Lisbon	Fernandes, Ronaldo
(Europe) (Germany) 2024–25	Group stage	Poland	3–1	W	Warsaw	B. Silva, Ronaldo, Bednarek (o.g.)
(Europe) (Germany) 2024–25	Group stage	Scotland	0–0	D	Glasgow	—
(Europe) (Germany) 2024–25	Group stage	Poland	5–1	W	Porto	Leão, Ronaldo (2), Fernandes, Neto
(Europe) (Germany) 2024–25	Group stage	Croatia	1–1	D	Split	Félix
(Europe) (Germany) 2024–25	Quarter-final	Denmark	0–1	L	Copenhagen	—
(Europe) (Germany) 2024–25	Quarter-final	Denmark	5–2 (a.e.t.)	W	Lisbon	Andersen (o.g.), Ronaldo, Trincão (2), Ramos
(Europe) (Germany) 2024–25	Semi-final	Germany	2–1	W	Munich	Conceição, Ronaldo
(Europe) (Germany) 2024–25	Final	Spain	2–2 (a.e.t.) (5–3 p)	D	Munich	Mendes, Ronaldo
(Europe) 2026–27	Group stage					
(Europe) 2026–27	Group stage	Wales	1–0	W	Lisbon	Félix
(Europe) 2026–27	Group stage	Norway	2–1	W	Oslo	Félix, Ramos
(Europe) 2026–27	Group stage	Denmark	4–2	W	Copenhagen	Cancelo, Ramos, Vitinha, Félix
(Europe) 2026–27	Group stage	Norway	2–1	W	Porto	Cancelo, Ramos
(Europe) 2026–27	Group stage	Denmark	1–4	L	Braga	B. Silva
(Europe) 2026–27	Group stage	Wales	17 Nov.		Cardiff	

== 2018–19 UEFA Nations League ==
=== Group stage ===
Pos	Team	Pld	W	D	L	GF	GA	GD	Pts	Qualification (Note: Due to revamp of the format for the 2020–21 UEFA Nations League, no teams were eventually relegated.)	(Portugal)	(Italy)	(Poland)
1	Portugal	4	2	2	0	5	3	+2	8	Qualification for Nations League Finals	—	1–0	1–1
2	Italy	4	1	2	1	2	2	0	5		0–0	—	1–1
3	Poland	4	0	2	2	4	6	−2	2		2–3	0–1	—

Source: UEFA
Rules for classification: Tiebreakers
Notes:
10 September 2018
20:45 (19:45 UTC+1)

Portugal	1–0	Italy
A. Silva 48'	Report

Estádio da Luz, Lisbon
Attendance: 52,635
Referee: Willie Collum (Scotland)

11 October 2018
20:45

Poland	2–3	Portugal
Piątek 18'; Błaszczykowski 77'	Report	A. Silva 32'; Glik 43' (o.g.); B. Silva 52'

Stadion Śląski, Chorzów
Attendance: 48,783
Referee: Carlos del Cerro Grande (Spain)

17 November 2018
20:45

Italy	0–0	Portugal
	Report

San Siro, Milan
Attendance: 73,000
Referee: Danny Makkelie (Netherlands)

20 November 2018
20:45 (19:45 UTC+0)

Portugal	1–1	Poland
A. Silva 34'	Report	Milik 66' (pen.)

Estádio D. Afonso Henriques, Guimarães
Attendance: 29,917
Referee: Sergei Karasev (Russia)

=== Finals ===
Semi-finals

5 June 2019
20:45 (19:45 UTC+1)

Portugal	3–1	Switzerland
Ronaldo 25', 88', 90'	Report	Rodriguez 57' (pen.)

Estádio do Dragão, Porto
Attendance: 42,415
Referee: Felix Brych (Germany)

Final

9 June 2019
20:45 (19:45 UTC+1)

Portugal	1–0	Netherlands
Guedes 60'	Report

Estádio do Dragão, Porto
Attendance: 43,199
Referee: Alberto Undiano Mallenco (Spain)

== 2020–21 UEFA Nations League ==
=== Group stage ===
Pos	Team	Pld	W	D	L	GF	GA	GD	Pts	Qualification or relegation	(France)	(Portugal)	(Croatia)	(Sweden)
1	France	6	5	1	0	12	5	+7	16	Qualification for Nations League Finals	—	0–0	4–2	4–2
2	Portugal	6	4	1	1	12	4	+8	13		0–1	—	4–1	3–0
3	Croatia	6	1	0	5	9	16	−7	3 (Note: Tied on head-to-head results. Overall goal difference was used as the tiebreaker.)		1–2	2–3	—	2–1
4	Sweden (R)	6	1	0	5	5	13	−8	3	Relegation to League B	0–1	0–2	2–1	—

Source: UEFA
Rules for classification: Tiebreakers
(R) Relegated
Notes:
5 September 2020
20:45 (19:45 UTC+1)

Portugal	4–1	Croatia
Cancelo 41'; Jota 58'; Félix 70'; A. Silva 90+5'	Report	Petković 90+1'

Estádio do Dragão, Porto
Attendance: 0 (Note: Due to the COVID-19 pandemic in Europe, all matches scheduled for September 2020 were played behind closed doors.)
Referee: Davide Massa (Italy)

8 September 2020
20:45

Sweden	0–2	Portugal
	Report	Ronaldo 45+1', 72'

Friends Arena, Solna
Attendance: 0
Referee: Danny Makkelie (Netherlands)

11 October 2020
20:45

France	0–0	Portugal
	Report

Stade de France, Saint-Denis
Attendance: 1,000
Referee: Carlos del Cerro Grande (Spain)

14 October 2020
20:45 (19:45 UTC+1)

Portugal	3–0	Sweden
B. Silva 21'; Jota 44', 72'	Report

Estádio José Alvalade, Lisbon
Attendance: 5,000
Referee: Srđan Jovanović (Serbia)

14 November 2020
20:45 (19:45 UTC±0)

Portugal	0–1	France
	Report	Kanté 54'

Estádio da Luz, Lisbon
Attendance: 0 (Note: Due to the COVID-19 pandemic in Europe, the match was played behind closed doors.)
Referee: Tobias Stieler (Germany)

17 November 2020
20:45

Croatia	2–3	Portugal
Kovačić 29', 65'	Report	Dias 52', 90'; Félix 60'

Stadion Poljud, Split
Attendance: 0
Referee: Michael Oliver (England)

== 2022–23 UEFA Nations League ==
=== Group stage ===
Pos	Team	Pld	W	D	L	GF	GA	GD	Pts	Qualification or relegation	(Spain)	(Portugal)	(Switzerland)	(Czech Republic)
1	Spain	6	3	2	1	8	5	+3	11	Qualification for Nations League Finals	—	1–1	1–2	2–0
2	Portugal	6	3	1	2	11	3	+8	10		0–1	—	4–0	2–0
3	Switzerland	6	3	0	3	6	9	−3	9		0–1	1–0	—	2–1
4	Czech Republic (R)	6	1	1	4	5	13	−8	4	Relegation to League B	2–2	0–4	2–1	—

Source: UEFA
Rules for classification: Tiebreakers
(R) Relegated
2 June 2022
20:45

Spain	1–1	Portugal
Morata 25'	Report	Horta 82'

Benito Villamarín, Seville
Attendance: 41,236
Referee: Michael Oliver (England)

5 June 2022
20:45 (19:45 UTC+1)

Portugal	4–0	Switzerland
Carvalho 15'; Ronaldo 35', 39'; Cancelo 68'	Report

Estádio José Alvalade, Lisbon
Attendance: 42,325
Referee: Orel Grinfeld (Israel)

9 June 2022
20:45 (19:45 UTC+1)

Portugal	2–0	Czech Republic
Cancelo 33'; Guedes 38'	Report

Estádio José Alvalade, Lisbon
Attendance: 44,100
Referee: Matej Jug (Slovenia)

12 June 2022
20:45

Switzerland	1–0	Portugal
Seferovic 1'	Report

Stade de Genève, Geneva
Attendance: 26,300
Referee: Fran Jović (Croatia)

24 September 2022
20:45

Czech Republic	0–4	Portugal
	Report	Dalot 33', 52'; Fernandes 45+2'; Jota 82'

Fortuna Arena, Prague
Attendance: 19,322
Referee: Srđan Jovanović (Serbia)

27 September 2022
20:45 (19:45 UTC+1)

Portugal	0–1	Spain
	Report	Morata 88'

Estádio Municipal, Braga
Attendance: 28,196
Referee: Daniele Orsato (Italy)

== 2024–25 UEFA Nations League ==
=== Group stage ===
Pos	Team	Pld	W	D	L	GF	GA	GD	Pts	Qualification or relegation	(Portugal)	(Croatia)	(Scotland)	(Poland)
1	Portugal	6	4	2	0	13	5	+8	14	Advance to quarter-finals	—	2–1	2–1	5–1
2	Croatia	6	2	2	2	8	8	0	8	Advance to quarter-finals	1–1	—	2–1	1–0
3	Scotland (R)	6	2	1	3	7	8	−1	7	Qualification for relegation play-offs	0–0	1–0	—	2–3
4	Poland (R)	6	1	1	4	9	16	−7	4	Relegation to League B	1–3	3–3	1–2	—

Source: UEFA
Rules for classification: Tiebreakers
(R) Relegated
5 September 2024
20:45 (19:45 UTC+1)

Portugal	2–1	Croatia
Dalot 7'; Ronaldo 34'	Report	Dalot 41' (o.g.)

Estádio da Luz, Lisbon
Attendance: 57,675
Referee: Halil Umut Meler (Turkey)

8 September 2024
20:45 (19:45 UTC+1)

Portugal	2–1	Scotland
Fernandes 54'; Ronaldo 88'	Report	McTominay 7'

Estádio da Luz, Lisbon
Attendance: 59,894
Referee: Maurizio Mariani (Italy)

12 October 2024
20:45

Poland	1–3	Portugal
Zieliński 78'	Report	B. Silva 26'; Ronaldo 37'; Bednarek 88' (o.g.)

Stadion Narodowy, Warsaw
Attendance: 56,854
Referee: Serdar Gözübüyük (Netherlands).

15 October 2024
20:45 (19:45 UTC+1)

Scotland	0–0	Portugal
	Report

Hampden Park, Glasgow
Attendance: 49,057
Referee: Lawrence Visser (Belgium)

15 November 2024
20:45 (19:45 UTC+0)

Portugal	5–1	Poland
Leão 59'; Ronaldo 72' (pen.), 87'; Fernandes 80'; Neto 83'	Report	Marczuk 88'

Estádio do Dragão, Porto
Attendance: 47,239
Referee: Donatas Rumšas (Lithuania)

18 November 2024
20:45

Croatia	1–1	Portugal
Gvardiol 65'	Report	Félix 33'

Stadion Poljud, Split
Attendance: 33,386
Referee: Davide Massa (Italy)

=== Quarter-finals ===
First leg

20 March 2025
20:45

Denmark	1–0	Portugal
Højlund 78'	Report

Parken Stadium, Copenhagen
Attendance: 36,322
Referee: Irfan Peljto (Bosnia and Herzegovina)

Second leg

23 March 2025
20:45 (19:45 UTC+0)

Portugal	5–2 (a.e.t.)	Denmark
Andersen 38' (o.g.); Ronaldo 72'; Trincão 86', 91'; Ramos 115'	Report	Kristensen 56'; Eriksen 76'

Estádio José Alvalade, Lisbon
Attendance: 47,123
Referee: Slavko Vinčić (Slovenia)

Portugal won 5–3 on aggregate.

=== Finals ===
Semi-finals

4 June 2025
21:10 (Note: The Germany v Portugal match, originally scheduled for 21:00, was delayed by ten minutes due to adverse weather conditions impacting the teams' warm-ups.)

Germany	1–2	Portugal
Wirtz 48'	Report	Conceição 63'; Ronaldo 68'

Allianz Arena, Munich
Attendance: 65,823
Referee: Slavko Vinčić (Slovenia)

Final

8 June 2025
21:00

Portugal	2–2 (a.e.t.)	Spain
Mendes 26'; Ronaldo 61'	Report	Zubimendi 21'; Oyarzabal 45'
Penalties
Ramos (penalty scored); Vitinha (penalty scored); Fernandes (penalty scored); Mendes (penalty scored); R. Neves (penalty scored)	5–3	(penalty scored) Merino; (penalty scored) Baena; (penalty scored) Isco; (penalty missed) Morata

Munich Football Arena , Munich
Attendance: 65,852
Referee: Sandro Schärer (Switzerland)

== 2026–27 UEFA Nations League ==
=== Group stage ===
Pos	Team	Pld	W	D	L	GF	GA	GD	Pts	Qualification or relegation	(Portugal)	(Denmark)	(Norway)	(Wales)
1	Portugal (Q)	5	4	0	1	10	8	+2	12	Advance to quarter-finals	—	1–4	2–1	1–0
2	Denmark (X)	5	3	0	2	11	8	+3	9	Advance to quarter-finals	2–4	—	17 Nov	2–0
3	Norway (X)	5	2	0	3	9	9	0	6	Possible qualification for relegation play-offs	1–2	3–2	—	3–1
4	Wales (Z)	5	1	0	4	3	8	−5	3	Qualification for relegation play-offs or relegation to League B	17 Nov	0–1	2–1	—

Updated to match(es) played on 14 November 2026. Source: UEFA
Rules for classification: Tiebreakers
(Q) Qualified for the phase indicated; (X) Safe from direct relegation; (Z) Can at best reach relegation play-offs
24 September 2026
20:45 (19:45 UTC+1)

Portugal	1–0	Wales
Félix 22'	Report

Estádio José Alvalade, Lisbon
Attendance: 47,725
Referee: Donatas Rumšas (Lithuania)

27 September 2026
20:45

Norway	1–2	Portugal
Haaland 51'	Report	Félix 17'; Ramos 54'

Ullevaal Stadion, Oslo
Attendance: 25,953
Referee: François Letexier (France)

1 October 2026
20:45

Denmark	2–4	Portugal
Damsgaard 23'; Højlund 53'	Report	Cancelo 13'; Ramos 25'; Vitinha 67'; Félix 87'

Parken Stadium, Copenhagen
Attendance: 35,951
Referee: Mykola Balakin (Ukraine)

4 October 2026
20:45 (19:45 UTC+1)

Portugal	2–1	Norway
Cancelo 38'; Ramos 79'	Report	Ajer 36'

Estádio do Dragão, Porto
Attendance: 48,832
Referee: Maurizio Mariani (Italy)

14 November 2026
20:45 (19:45 UTC+0)

Portugal	1–4	Denmark
B. Silva 90+3'	Report	Højbjerg 43' (pen.); Højlund 50', 57'; Andersen 75'

Estádio Municipal, Braga
Attendance: 24,879
Referee: Rade Obrenović (Slovenia)

17 November 2026
20:45 (19:45 UTC+0)

Wales	v	Portugal
	Report

Cardiff City Stadium, Cardiff

== Goalscorers ==
Player	Goals	2018–19	2020–21	2022–23	2024–25	2026–27
Cristiano Ronaldo	15	3	2	2	8	
João Félix	6		2		1	3
João Cancelo	5		1	2		2
Diogo Jota	4		3	1		
Gonçalo Ramos	4				1	3
André Silva	4	3	1			
Bernardo Silva	4	1	1		1	1
Diogo Dalot	3			2	1	
Bruno Fernandes	3			1	2	
Rúben Dias	2		2			
Gonçalo Guedes	2	1		1		
Francisco Trincão	2				2	
William Carvalho	1			1		
Francisco Conceição	1				1	
Ricardo Horta	1			1		
Rafael Leão	1				1	
Nuno Mendes	1				1	
Pedro Neto	1				1	
Vitinha	1					1
Own goals	3	1			2	
Total	64	9	12	11	22	10

Bold players are still active with the national team.

== See also ==
- Portugal at the FIFA Confederations Cup
- Portugal at the FIFA World Cup
- Portugal at the UEFA European Championship
