= Portugal at the FIFA Confederations Cup =

Football tournament results

Portugal appeared in the FIFA Confederations Cup for the first and only time in 2017 as the European representatives, following their UEFA Euro 2016 victory.

== Overall record ==
FIFA Confederations Cup record
Year	Round	Position	Pld	W	D	L	GF	GA
(Saudi Arabia) 1992	Did not qualify							
(Saudi Arabia) 1995	Did not qualify							
(Saudi Arabia) 1997	Did not qualify							
(Mexico) 1999	Did not qualify							
(South Korea) (Japan) 2001	Did not qualify							
(France) 2003	Did not qualify							
(Germany) 2005	Did not qualify							
(South Africa) 2009	Did not qualify							
(Brazil) 2013	Did not qualify							
(Russia) 2017	Third place	3rd	5	3	2*	0	9	3
Total	Third place	1/10	5	3	2	0	9	3

Portugal's FIFA Confederations Cup record
First Match	Portugal Portugal 2–2 Mexico (18 June 2017; Kazan, Russia)
Biggest Win	Portugal 4–0 New Zealand (24 June 2017; Saint Petersburg, Russia)
Biggest Defeat	—
Best Result	Third place in 2017
Worst Result	Third place in 2017

*Draws include knockout matches decided via penalty shoot-out. Darker colour indicates win, normal colour indicates lost.

== 2017 FIFA Confederations Cup ==
=== Group A ===
Pos	Team	Pld	W	D	L	GF	GA	GD	Pts	Qualification
1	Portugal	3	2	1	0	7	2	+5	7	Advance to knockout stage
2	Mexico	3	2	1	0	6	4	+2	7	Advance to knockout stage
3	Russia (H)	3	1	0	2	3	3	0	3	
4	New Zealand	3	0	0	3	1	8	−7	0	

Source: FIFA
Rules for classification: Group stage tiebreakers
(H) Hosts
18 June 2017
18:00

Portugal	2–2	Mexico
Quaresma 34'; Cédric 86'	Report	Hernández 42'; Moreno 90+1'

Kazan Arena, Kazan
Attendance: 34,372
Referee: Néstor Pitana (Argentina)

21 June 2017
18:00

Russia	0–1	Portugal
	Report	Ronaldo 8'

Otkritie Arena, Moscow
Attendance: 42,759
Referee: Gianluca Rocchi (Italy)

24 June 2017
18:00

New Zealand	0–4	Portugal
	Report	Ronaldo 33' (pen.); B. Silva 37'; A. Silva 80'; Nani 90+1'

Krestovsky Stadium, Saint Petersburg
Attendance: 56,290
Referee: Mark Geiger (United States)

=== Semi-finals ===
28 June 2017
21:00

Portugal	0–0 (a.e.t.)	Chile
	Report
Penalties
Quaresma (penalty missed); Moutinho (penalty missed); Nani (penalty missed)	0–3	(penalty scored) Vidal; (penalty scored) Aránguiz; (penalty scored) Sánchez

Kazan Arena, Kazan
Attendance: 40,855
Referee: Alireza Faghani (Iran)

=== Third place play-off ===
2 July 2017
15:00

Portugal	2–1 (a.e.t.)	Mexico
Pepe 90+1'; Adrien 104' (pen.)	Report	Neto 54' (o.g.)

Otkritie Arena, Moscow
Attendance: 42,659
Referee: Fahad Al-Mirdasi (Saudi Arabia)

== Head-to-head record ==
Opponent	Pld	W	D	L	GF	GA	GD	Win %
Chile	1	0	1	0	0	0	+0	0.00
Mexico	2	1	1	0	4	3	+1	50.00
New Zealand	1	1	0	0	4	0	+4	100.00
Russia	1	1	0	0	1	0	+1	100.00
Total	5	3	2	0	9	3	+6	60.00

== Goalscorers ==
Rank	Player	Goals	Confederations Cup
1	Cristiano Ronaldo	2	2017
2	Nani	1	2017
2	Pepe	1	2017
2	Ricardo Quaresma	1	2017
2	Adrien Silva	1	2017
2	André Silva	1	2017
2	Bernardo Silva	1	2017
2	Cédric Soares	1	2017

== See also ==
- Portugal at the FIFA World Cup
- Portugal at the UEFA European Championship
- Portugal at the UEFA Nations League
