= Portugal at the UEFA European Championship =

International football delegation

Portugal have participated in nine editions of the UEFA European Championship. Their first tournament was in 1984, and the side have advanced past the group stage in every edition they've participated in so far. Portugal have reached the semi-finals on five occasions, and reached the final as hosts in 2004, however losing to the heavy tournament underdogs Greece. They captured their first major tournament win after defeating hosts France 1–0 in the final of Euro 2016.

== UEFA Euro 1984 ==
=== Group stage ===
Pos	Team	Pld	W	D	L	GF	GA	GD	Pts	Qualification
1	Spain	3	1	2	0	3	2	+1	4	Advance to knockout stage
2	Portugal	3	1	2	0	2	1	+1	4	Advance to knockout stage
3	West Germany	3	1	1	1	2	2	0	3	
4	Romania	3	0	1	2	2	4	−2	1	

Source: UEFA
Rules for classification: Group stage tiebreakers
14 June 1984
17:15

West Germany	0–0	Portugal
	Report

Stade de la Meinau, Strasbourg
Attendance: 44,707
Referee: Romualdas Juška (Soviet Union)

17 June 1984
20:30

Portugal	1–1	Spain
Sousa 52'	Report	Santillana 73'

Stade Vélodrome, Marseille
Attendance: 24,364
Referee: Michel Vautrot (France)

20 June 1984
20:30

Portugal	1–0	Romania
Nené 81'	Report

Stade de la Beaujoire, Nantes
Attendance: 24,464
Referee: Heinz Fahnler (Austria)

=== Knockout stage ===
Semi-finals

23 June 1984
20:00

France	3–2 (a.e.t.)	Portugal
Domergue 24', 114'; Platini 119'	Report	Jordão 74', 98'

Stade Vélodrome, Marseille
Attendance: 54,848
Referee: Paolo Bergamo (Italy)

== UEFA Euro 1996 ==
=== Group stage ===
Pos	Team	Pld	W	D	L	GF	GA	GD	Pts	Qualification
1	Portugal	3	2	1	0	5	1	+4	7	Advance to knockout stage
2	Croatia	3	2	0	1	4	3	+1	6	Advance to knockout stage
3	Denmark	3	1	1	1	4	4	0	4	
4	Turkey	3	0	0	3	0	5	−5	0	

Source: UEFA
Rules for classification: Group stage tiebreakers
9 June 1996
19:30

Denmark	1–1	Portugal
B. Laudrup 22'	Report	Sá Pinto 53'

Hillsborough, Sheffield
Attendance: 34,993
Referee: Mario van der Ende (Netherlands)

14 June 1996
16:30

Portugal	1–0	Turkey
Couto 66'	Report

City Ground, Nottingham
Attendance: 22,670
Referee: Sándor Puhl (Hungary)

19 June 1996
16:30

Croatia	0–3	Portugal
	Report	Figo 4'; João Pinto 33'; Domingos 82'

City Ground, Nottingham
Attendance: 20,484
Referee: Bernd Heynemann (Germany)

=== Knockout stage ===
Quarter-finals

23 June 1996
18:30

Czech Republic	1–0	Portugal
Poborský 53'	Report

Villa Park, Birmingham
Attendance: 26,832
Referee: Hellmut Krug (Germany)

== UEFA Euro 2000 ==
=== Group stage ===
Pos	Team	Pld	W	D	L	GF	GA	GD	Pts	Qualification
1	Portugal	3	3	0	0	7	2	+5	9	Advance to knockout stage
2	Romania	3	1	1	1	4	4	0	4	Advance to knockout stage
3	England	3	1	0	2	5	6	−1	3	
4	Germany	3	0	1	2	1	5	−4	1	

Source: UEFA
Rules for classification: Group stage tiebreakers
12 June 2000
20:45

Portugal	3–2	England
Figo 22'; João Pinto 37'; Nuno Gomes 59'	Report	Scholes 3'; McManaman 18'

Philips Stadion, Eindhoven
Attendance: 31,500
Referee: Anders Frisk (Sweden)

17 June 2000
18:00

Romania	0–1	Portugal
	Report	Costinha 90+4'

GelreDome, Arnhem
Attendance: 28,400
Referee: Gilles Veissière (France)

20 June 2000
20:45

Portugal	3–0	Germany
Conceição 35', 54', 71'	Report

Feijenoord Stadion, Rotterdam
Attendance: 44,000
Referee: Dick Jol (Netherlands)

=== Knockout stage ===
Quarter-finals

24 June 2000
18:00

Portugal	2–0	Turkey
Nuno Gomes 44', 56'	Report

Amsterdam Arena, Amsterdam
Attendance: 42,000
Referee: Dick Jol (Netherlands)

Semi-finals

28 June 2000
20:45

France	2–1 (a.e.t./g.g.)	Portugal
Henry 51'; Zidane 117' (pen.)	Report	Nuno Gomes 19'

King Baudouin Stadium, Brussels
Attendance: 48,000
Referee: Günter Benkö (Austria)

== UEFA Euro 2004 ==
=== Group stage ===
Pos	Team	Pld	W	D	L	GF	GA	GD	Pts	Qualification
1	Portugal (H)	3	2	0	1	4	2	+2	6	Advance to knockout stage
2	Greece	3	1	1	1	4	4	0	4 (Note: Tied on head-to-head result (Greece 1–1 Spain) and overall goal difference (0). Overall goals for was used as the tiebreaker.)	Advance to knockout stage
3	Spain	3	1	1	1	2	2	0	4	
4	Russia	3	1	0	2	2	4	−2	3	

Source: UEFA
Rules for classification: Group stage tiebreakers
(H) Hosts
Notes:
12 June 2004
17:00

Portugal	1–2	Greece
Ronaldo 90+3'	Report	Karagounis 7'; Basinas 51' (pen.)

Estádio do Dragão, Porto
Attendance: 48,761
Referee: Pierluigi Collina (Italy)

16 June 2004
19:45

Russia	0–2	Portugal
	Report	Maniche 7'; Rui Costa 89'

Estádio da Luz, Lisbon
Attendance: 59,273
Referee: Terje Hauge (Norway)

20 June 2004
19:45

Spain	0–1	Portugal
	Report	Nuno Gomes 57'

Estádio José Alvalade, Lisbon
Attendance: 47,491
Referee: Anders Frisk (Sweden)

=== Knockout stage ===
Quarter-finals

24 June 2004
19:45

Portugal	2–2 (a.e.t.)	England
Postiga 83'; Rui Costa 110'	Report	Owen 3'; Lampard 115'
Penalties
Deco (penalty scored); Simão (penalty scored); Rui Costa (penalty missed); Ronaldo (penalty scored); Maniche (penalty scored); Postiga (penalty scored); Ricardo (penalty scored)	6–5	(penalty missed) Beckham; (penalty scored) Owen; (penalty scored) Lampard; (penalty scored) Terry; (penalty scored) Hargreaves; (penalty scored) A. Cole; (penalty missed) Vassell

Estádio da Luz, Lisbon
Attendance: 62,564
Referee: Urs Meier (Switzerland)

Semi-finals

30 June 2004
19:45

Portugal	2–1	Netherlands
Ronaldo 26'; Maniche 58'	Report	Andrade 63' (o.g.)

Estádio José Alvalade, Lisbon
Attendance: 46,679
Referee: Anders Frisk (Sweden)

Final

4 July 2004
19:45

Portugal	0–1	Greece
	Report	Charisteas 57'

Estádio da Luz, Lisbon
Attendance: 62,865
Referee: Markus Merk (Germany)

== UEFA Euro 2008 ==
=== Group stage ===
Pos	Team	Pld	W	D	L	GF	GA	GD	Pts	Qualification
1	Portugal	3	2	0	1	5	3	+2	6 (Note: Head-to-head result: Portugal 2–0 Turkey.)	Advance to knockout stage
2	Turkey	3	2	0	1	5	5	0	6	Advance to knockout stage
3	Czech Republic	3	1	0	2	4	6	−2	3 (Note: Head-to-head result: Switzerland 0–1 Czech Republic.)	
4	Switzerland (H)	3	1	0	2	3	3	0	3	

Source: UEFA
Rules for classification: Group stage tiebreakers
(H) Hosts
Notes:
7 June 2008
20:45

Portugal	2–0	Turkey
Pepe 61'; Meireles 90+3'	Report

Stade de Genève, Geneva
Attendance: 29,106
Referee: Herbert Fandel (Germany)

11 June 2008
18:00

Czech Republic	1–3	Portugal
Sionko 17'	Report	Deco 8'; Ronaldo 63'; Quaresma 90+1'

Stade de Genève, Geneva
Attendance: 29,016
Referee: Kyros Vassaras (Greece)

15 June 2008
20:45

Switzerland	2–0	Portugal
Yakin 71', 83' (pen.)	Report

St. Jakob-Park, Basel
Attendance: 39,730
Referee: Konrad Plautz (Austria)

=== Knockout stage ===
Quarter-finals

19 June 2008
20:45

Portugal	2–3	Germany
Nuno Gomes 40'; Postiga 87'	Report	Schweinsteiger 22'; Klose 26'; Ballack 61'

St. Jakob-Park, Basel
Attendance: 39,374
Referee: Peter Fröjdfeldt (Sweden)

== UEFA Euro 2012 ==
=== Group stage ===
Pos	Team	Pld	W	D	L	GF	GA	GD	Pts	Qualification
1	Germany	3	3	0	0	5	2	+3	9	Advance to knockout stage
2	Portugal	3	2	0	1	5	4	+1	6	Advance to knockout stage
3	Denmark	3	1	0	2	4	5	−1	3	
4	Netherlands	3	0	0	3	2	5	−3	0	

Source: UEFA
Rules for classification: Group stage tiebreakers
9 June 2012
21:45 EEST

Germany	1–0	Portugal
Gómez 72'	Report

Arena Lviv, Lviv
Attendance: 32,990
Referee: Stéphane Lannoy (France)

13 June 2012
19:00 EEST

Denmark	2–3	Portugal
Bendtner 41', 80'	Report	Pepe 24'; Postiga 36'; Varela 87'

Arena Lviv, Lviv
Attendance: 31,840
Referee: Craig Thomson (Scotland)

17 June 2012
21:45 EEST

Portugal	2–1	Netherlands
Ronaldo 28', 74'	Report	Van der Vaart 11'

Metalist Stadium, Kharkiv
Attendance: 37,445
Referee: Nicola Rizzoli (Italy)

=== Knockout stage ===
Quarter-finals

21 June 2012
20:45 CEST

Czech Republic	0–1	Portugal
	Report	Ronaldo 79'

National Stadium, Warsaw
Attendance: 55,590
Referee: Howard Webb (England)

Semi-finals

27 June 2012
21:45 EEST

Portugal	0–0 (a.e.t.)	Spain
	Report
Penalties
Moutinho (penalty missed); Pepe (penalty scored); Nani (penalty scored); Alves (penalty missed)	2–4	(penalty missed) Alonso; (penalty scored) Iniesta; (penalty scored) Piqué; (penalty scored) Ramos; (penalty scored) Fàbregas

Donbas Arena, Donetsk
Attendance: 48,000
Referee: Cüneyt Çakır (Turkey)

== UEFA Euro 2016 ==
=== Group stage ===
Pos	Team	Pld	W	D	L	GF	GA	GD	Pts	Qualification
1	Hungary	3	1	2	0	6	4	+2	5 (Note: Tied on head-to-head result (Iceland 1–1 Hungary). Overall goal difference was used as the tiebreaker.)	Advance to knockout stage
2	Iceland	3	1	2	0	4	3	+1	5	Advance to knockout stage
3	Portugal	3	0	3	0	4	4	0	3	Advance to knockout stage
4	Austria	3	0	1	2	1	4	−3	1	

Source: UEFA
Rules for classification: Group stage tiebreakers
Notes:
14 June 2016
21:00

Portugal	1–1	Iceland
Nani 31'	Report	B. Bjarnason 50'

Stade Geoffroy-Guichard, Saint-Étienne
Attendance: 38,742
Referee: Cüneyt Çakır (Turkey)

18 June 2016
21:00

Portugal	0–0	Austria
	Report

Parc des Princes, Paris
Attendance: 44,291
Referee: Nicola Rizzoli (Italy)

22 June 2016
18:00

Hungary	3–3	Portugal
Gera 19'; Dzsudzsák 47', 55'	Report	Nani 42'; Ronaldo 50', 62'

Parc Olympique Lyonnais, Décines-Charpieu
Attendance: 55,514
Referee: Martin Atkinson (England)

Ranking of third-placed teams

Pos	Grp	Team	Pld	W	D	L	GF	GA	GD	Pts	Qualification
1	B	Slovakia	3	1	1	1	3	3	0	4	Advance to knockout stage
2	E	Republic of Ireland	3	1	1	1	2	4	−2	4	Advance to knockout stage
3	F	Portugal	3	0	3	0	4	4	0	3	Advance to knockout stage
4	C	Northern Ireland	3	1	0	2	2	2	0	3	Advance to knockout stage
5	D	Turkey	3	1	0	2	2	4	−2	3	
6	A	Albania	3	1	0	2	1	3	−2	3	

Source: UEFA
Rules for classification: 1) Higher number of points obtained; 2) Superior goal difference; 3) Higher number of goals scored; 4) Fair play conduct; 5) Position in the UEFA national team coefficient ranking system.

=== Knockout stage ===
Round of 16

25 June 2016
21:00

Croatia	0–1 (a.e.t.)	Portugal
	Report	Quaresma 117'

Stade Bollaert-Delelis, Lens
Attendance: 33,523
Referee: Carlos Velasco Carballo (Spain)

Quarter-finals

30 June 2016
21:00

Poland	1–1 (a.e.t.)	Portugal
Lewandowski 2'	Report	Sanches 33'
Penalties
Lewandowski (penalty scored); Milik (penalty scored); Glik (penalty scored); Błaszczykowski (penalty missed)	3–5	(penalty scored) Ronaldo; (penalty scored) Sanches; (penalty scored) Moutinho; (penalty scored) Nani; (penalty scored) Quaresma

Stade Vélodrome, Marseille
Attendance: 62,940
Referee: Felix Brych (Germany)

Semi-finals

6 July 2016
21:00

Portugal	2–0	Wales
Ronaldo 50'; Nani 53'	Report

Parc Olympique Lyonnais, Décines-Charpieu
Attendance: 55,679
Referee: Jonas Eriksson (Sweden)

Final

10 July 2016
21:00

Portugal	1–0 (a.e.t.)	France
Eder 109'	Report

Stade de France, Saint-Denis
Attendance: 75,868
Referee: Mark Clattenburg (England)

== UEFA Euro 2020 ==
=== Group stage ===
Pos	Team	Pld	W	D	L	GF	GA	GD	Pts	Qualification
1	France	3	1	2	0	4	3	+1	5	Advance to knockout stage
2	Germany (H)	3	1	1	1	6	5	+1	4 (Note: Head-to-head result: Portugal 2–4 Germany.)	Advance to knockout stage
3	Portugal	3	1	1	1	7	6	+1	4	Advance to knockout stage
4	Hungary (H)	3	0	2	1	3	6	−3	2	

Source: UEFA
Rules for classification: Group stage tiebreakers
(H) Hosts
Notes:
15 June 2021
18:00

Hungary	0–3	Portugal
	Report	Guerreiro 84'; Ronaldo 87' (pen.), 90+2'

Puskás Aréna, Budapest
Attendance: 55,662
Referee: Cüneyt Çakır (Turkey)

19 June 2021
18:00

Portugal	2–4	Germany
Ronaldo 15'; Jota 67'	Report	Dias 35' (o.g.); Guerreiro 39' (o.g.); Havertz 51'; Gosens 60'

Allianz Arena, Munich
Attendance: 12,926
Referee: Anthony Taylor (England)

23 June 2021
21:00

Portugal	2–2	France
Ronaldo 31' (pen.), 60' (pen.)	Report	Benzema 45+2' (pen.), 47'

Puskás Aréna, Budapest
Attendance: 54,886
Referee: Antonio Mateu Lahoz (Spain)

Ranking of third-placed teams

Pos	Grp	Team	Pld	W	D	L	GF	GA	GD	Pts	Qualification
1	F	Portugal	3	1	1	1	7	6	+1	4	Advance to knockout stage
2	D	Czech Republic	3	1	1	1	3	2	+1	4	Advance to knockout stage
3	A	Switzerland	3	1	1	1	4	5	−1	4	Advance to knockout stage
4	C	Ukraine	3	1	0	2	4	5	−1	3	Advance to knockout stage
5	B	Finland	3	1	0	2	1	3	−2	3	
6	E	Slovakia	3	1	0	2	2	7	−5	3	

Source: UEFA
Rules for classification: 1) Points; 2) Goal difference; 3) Goals scored; 4) Wins; 5) Lower disciplinary points total; 6) European Qualifiers overall ranking.

=== Knockout stage ===
Round of 16

27 June 2021
21:00

Belgium	1–0	Portugal
T. Hazard 42'	Report

Estadio de La Cartuja, Seville
Attendance: 11,504
Referee: Felix Brych (Germany)

== UEFA Euro 2024 ==
=== Group stage ===
Pos	Team	Pld	W	D	L	GF	GA	GD	Pts	Qualification
1	Portugal	3	2	0	1	5	3	+2	6 (Note: Head-to-head result: Turkey 0–3 Portugal.)	Advance to knockout stage
2	Turkey	3	2	0	1	5	5	0	6	Advance to knockout stage
3	Georgia	3	1	1	1	4	4	0	4	Advance to knockout stage
4	Czech Republic	3	0	1	2	3	5	−2	1	

Source: UEFA
Notes:
18 June 2024
21:00

Portugal	2–1	Czech Republic
Hranáč 69' (o.g.); Conceição 90+2'	Report	Provod 62'

Red Bull Arena, Leipzig
Attendance: 38,421
Referee: Marco Guida (Italy)

22 June 2024
18:00

Turkey	0–3	Portugal
	Report	B. Silva 21'; Akaydin 28' (o.g.); Fernandes 56'

Westfalenstadion, Dortmund
Attendance: 61,047
Referee: Felix Zwayer (Germany)

26 June 2024
21:00

Georgia	2–0	Portugal
Kvaratskhelia 2'; Mikautadze 57' (pen.)	Report

Arena AufSchalke, Gelsenkirchen
Attendance: 49,616
Referee: Sandro Schärer (Switzerland)

=== Knockout stage ===
Round of 16

1 July 2024
21:00

Portugal	0–0 (a.e.t.)	Slovenia
	Report
Penalties
Ronaldo (penalty scored); Fernandes (penalty scored); B. Silva (penalty scored)	3–0	(penalty missed) Iličić; (penalty missed) Balkovec; (penalty missed) Verbič

Waldstadion, Frankfurt
Attendance: 46,576
Referee: Daniele Orsato (Italy)

Quarter-finals

5 July 2024
21:00

Portugal	0–0 (a.e.t.)	France
	Report
Penalties
Ronaldo (penalty scored); B. Silva (penalty scored); Félix (penalty missed); Mendes (penalty scored)	3–5	(penalty scored) Dembélé; (penalty scored) Fofana; (penalty scored) Koundé; (penalty scored) Barcola; (penalty scored) Hernandez

Volksparkstadion, Hamburg
Attendance: 47,789
Referee: Michael Oliver (England)

== Overall record ==
Line-ups for the Euro 2016 final, in which Portugal (in red) defeated hosts France 1–0 after extra time

Year	Round	Position	Pld	W	D	L	GF	GA
(France) 1960	Did not qualify							
(Spain) 1964	Did not qualify							
(Italy) 1968	Did not qualify							
(Belgium) 1972	Did not qualify							
(Socialist Federal Republic of Yugoslavia) 1976	Did not qualify							
(Italy) 1980	Did not qualify							
(France) 1984	Semi-finals	3rd	4	1	2	1	4	4
(Germany) 1988	Did not qualify							
(Sweden) 1992	Did not qualify							
(England) 1996	Quarter-finals	5th	4	2	1	1	5	2
(Belgium) (Netherlands) 2000	Semi-finals	3rd	5	4	0	1	10	4
(Portugal) 2004	Runners-up	2nd	6	3	1*	2	8	6
(Austria) (Switzerland) 2008	Quarter-finals	7th	4	2	0	2	7	6
(Poland) (Ukraine) 2012	Semi-finals	3rd	5	3	1*	1	6	4
(France) 2016	Champions	1st	7	3	4*	0	9	5
(Europe) 2020	Round of 16	13th	4	1	1	2	7	7
(Germany) 2024	Quarter-finals	8th	5	2	2*	1	5	3
(United Kingdom) (Republic of Ireland) 2028	To be determined							
(Italy) (Turkey) 2032	To be determined							
Total	1 Title	9/17	44	21	12	11	61	41

*Draws include knockout matches decided via penalty shoot-out.
**Gold background colour indicates that the tournament was won.
***Red border colour indicates that the tournament was held on home soil.

Portugal's UEFA European Championship record
First Match	Portugal 0–0 West Germany (14 June 1984; Strasbourg, France)
Biggest Win	Croatia 0–3 Portugal (19 June 1996; Nottingham, England); Portugal 3–0 Germany (20 June 2000; Rotterdam, Netherlands); Hungary 0–3 Portugal (15 June 2021; Budapest, Hungary); Turkey 0–3 Portugal (22 June 2024; Dortmund, Germany)
Biggest Defeat	Switzerland 2–0 Portugal (15 June 2008; Basel, Switzerland); Portugal 2–4 Germany (19 June 2021; Munich, Germany); Georgia 2–0 Portugal (26 June 2024; Gelsenkirchen, Germany)
Best Result	Champions in 2016
Worst Result	Round of 16 in 2020

== Matches ==
Year	Round	Opponent	Score	Portugal scorers
1984	Group stage	West Germany	0–0	–
1984	Group stage	Spain	1–1	Sousa
1984	Group stage	Romania	1–0	Nené
1984	Semi-final	France	2–3 (a.e.t.)	Jordão (2)
1996	Group stage	Denmark	1–1	Sá Pinto
1996	Group stage	Turkey	1–0	Couto
1996	Group stage	Croatia	3–0	Figo, João Pinto, Domingos
1996	Quarter-final	Czech Republic	0–1	–
2000	Group stage	England	3–2	Figo, João Pinto, Nuno Gomes
2000	Group stage	Romania	1–0	Costinha
2000	Group stage	Germany	3–0	S. Conceição (3)
2000	Quarter-final	Turkey	2–0	Nuno Gomes (2)
2000	Semi-final	France	1–2 (a.s.d.e.t.)	Nuno Gomes
2004	Group stage	Greece	1–2	Ronaldo
2004	Group stage	Russia	2–0	Maniche, Rui Costa
2004	Group stage	Spain	1–0	Nuno Gomes
2004	Quarter-final	England	2–2 (a.e.t.) (6–5 p)	Postiga, Rui Costa
2004	Semi-final	Netherlands	2–1	Ronaldo, Maniche
2004	Final	Greece	0–1	–
2008	Group stage	Turkey	2–0	Pepe, Meireles
2008	Group stage	Czech Republic	3–1	Deco, Ronaldo, Quaresma
2008	Group stage	Switzerland	0–2	–
2008	Quarter-final	Germany	2–3	Nuno Gomes, Postiga
2012	Group stage	Germany	0–1	–
2012	Group stage	Denmark	3–2	Pepe, Postiga, Varela
2012	Group stage	Netherlands	2–1	Ronaldo (2)
2012	Quarter-final	Czech Republic	1–0	Ronaldo
2012	Semi-final	Spain	0–0 (a.e.t.) (2–4 p)	–
2016	Group stage	Iceland	1–1	Nani
2016	Group stage	Austria	0–0	–
2016	Group stage	Hungary	3–3	Nani, Ronaldo (2)
2016	Round of 16	Croatia	1–0 (a.e.t.)	Quaresma
2016	Quarter-final	Poland	1–1 (a.e.t.) (5–3 p)	Sanches
2016	Semi-final	Wales	2–0	Ronaldo, Nani
2016	Final	France	1–0 (a.e.t.)	Eder
2020	Group stage	Hungary	3–0	Guerreiro, Ronaldo (2)
2020	Group stage	Germany	2–4	Ronaldo, Jota
2020	Group stage	France	2–2	Ronaldo (2)
2020	Round of 16	Belgium	0–1	–
2024	Group stage	Czech Republic	2–1	Hranáč (o.g.), F. Conceição
2024	Group stage	Turkey	3–0	B. Silva, Akaydin (o.g.), Fernandes
2024	Group stage	Georgia	0–2	–
2024	Round of 16	Slovenia	0–0 (a.e.t.) (3–0 p)	–
2024	Quarter-final	France	0–0 (a.e.t.) (3–5 p)	–

== Goalscorers ==
Player	Goals	1984	1996	2000	2004	2008	2012	2016	2020	2024
Cristiano Ronaldo	14				2	1	3	3	5	
Nuno Gomes	6			4	1	1				
Sérgio Conceição	3			3						
Nani	3							3		
Hélder Postiga	3				1	1	1			
Luís Figo	2		1	1						
Rui Costa	2				2					
João Vieira Pinto	2		1	1						
Rui Jordão	2	2								
Ricardo Quaresma	2					1		1		
Maniche	2				2					
Pepe	2					1	1			
Éder	1							1		
Nené	1	1								
Bernardo Silva	1									1
Bruno Fernandes	1									1
Diogo Jota	1								1	
Deco	1					1				
Renato Sanches	1							1		
Raul Meireles	1					1				
Domingos Paciência	1		1							
Ricardo Sá Pinto	1		1							
Costinha	1			1						
Fernando Couto	1		1							
António Sousa	1	1								
Raphaël Guerreiro	1								1	
Silvestre Varela	1						1			
Francisco Conceição	1									1
Own goals	2									2
Total	61	4	5	10	8	7	6	9	7	5

Own goals scored for opponents

- Jorge Andrade (scored for Netherlands in 2004)
- Rúben Dias (scored for Germany in 2020)
- Raphaël Guerreiro (scored for Germany in 2020)

== Head-to-head record ==
Opponent	Pld	W	D	L	GF	GA
Austria	1	0	1	0	0	0
Belgium	1	0	0	1	0	1
Croatia	2	2	0	0	4	0
Czech Republic	4	3	0	1	6	3
Denmark	2	1	1	0	4	3
England	2	1	1	0	5	4
France	5	1	2	2	6	7
Georgia	1	0	0	1	0	2
Germany	5	1	1	3	7	8
Greece	2	0	0	2	1	3
Hungary	2	1	1	0	6	3
Iceland	1	0	1	0	1	1
Netherlands	2	2	0	0	4	2
Poland	1	0	1	0	1	1
Romania	2	2	0	0	2	0
Russia	1	1	0	0	2	0
Slovenia	1	0	1	0	0	0
Spain	3	1	2	0	2	1
Switzerland	1	0	0	1	0	2
Turkey	4	4	0	0	8	0
Wales	1	1	0	0	2	0
Total	44	21	12	11	61	41

== See also ==
- Portugal at the FIFA Confederations Cup
- Portugal at the FIFA World Cup
- Portugal in the UEFA Nations League
