= 2022 FIFA World Cup Group H =

Football group consisting of Portugal, Ghana, Uruguay, and South Korea

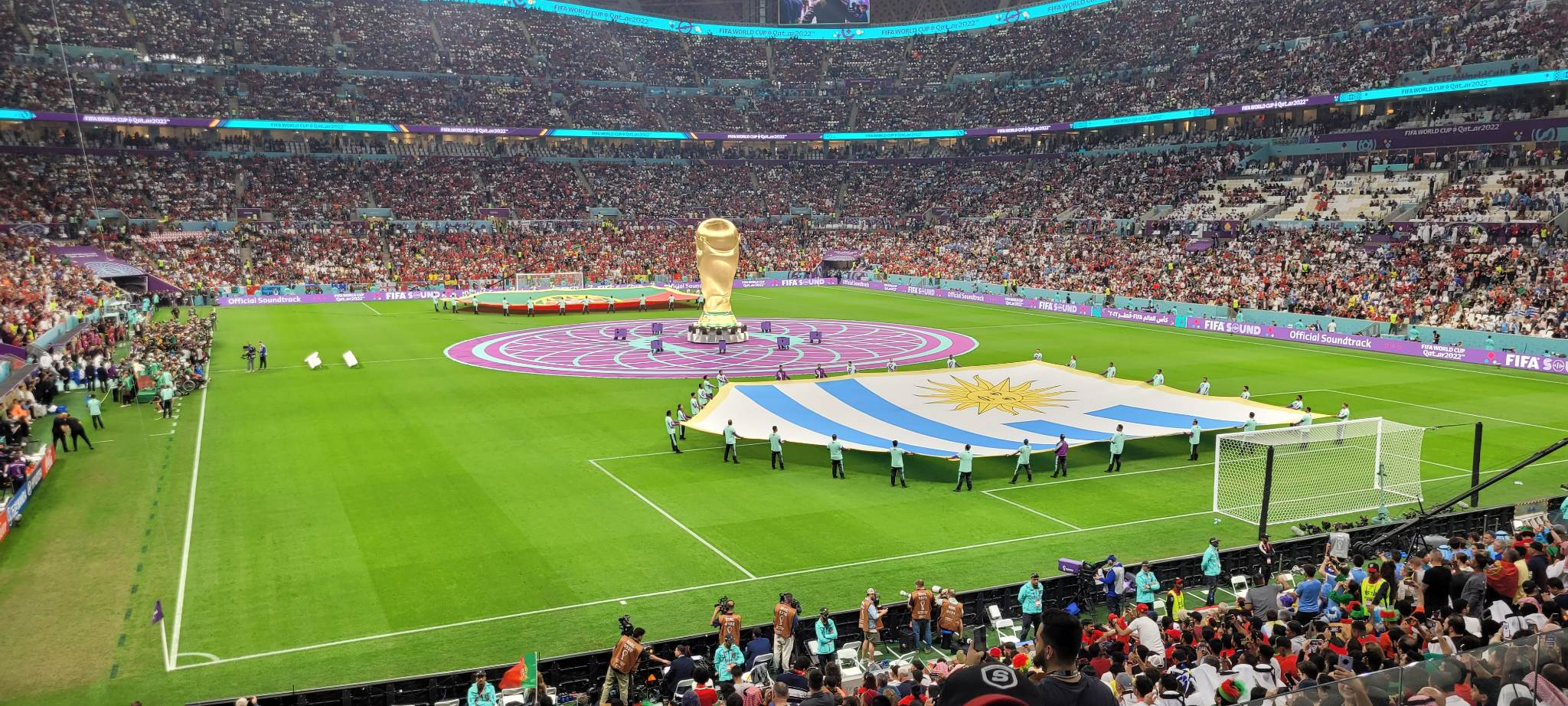
The opening ceremony of the match between Uruguay and Portugal

Matches in Group H of the 2022 FIFA World Cup took place from 24 November to 2 December 2022. The group consisted of Portugal, Ghana, Uruguay and South Korea. The top two teams, Portugal and South Korea, advanced to the round of 16. South Korea advanced to the knockout stage for the first time since 2010. Uruguay exited the tournament after failing to progress the group stage for the first time since 2002, with South Korea's shock 2–1 victory over Portugal contributing to the elimination.

== Teams ==
Draw position	Team	Pot	Confederation	Method of qualification	Date of qualification	Finals appearance	Last appearance	Previous best performance	FIFA Rankings	
Draw position	Team	Pot	Confederation	Method of qualification	Date of qualification	Finals appearance	Last appearance	Previous best performance	March 2022 (Note: The rankings of March 2022 were used for seeding for the final draw.)	October 2022
H1	Portugal	1	UEFA	UEFA second round Path C winners	29 March 2022	8th	2018	Third place (1966)	8	9
H2	Ghana	4	CAF	CAF third round winners	29 March 2022	4th	2014	Quarter-finals (2010)	60	61
H3	Uruguay	2	CONMEBOL	CONMEBOL round robin third place	24 March 2022	14th	2018	Winners (1930, 1950)	13	14
H4	South Korea	3	AFC	AFC third round Group A runners-up	1 February 2022	11th	2018	Fourth place (2002)	29	28

== Standings ==
Pos	Team	Pld	W	D	L	GF	GA	GD	Pts	Qualification
1	Portugal	3	2	0	1	6	4	+2	6	Advance to knockout stage
2	South Korea	3	1	1	1	4	4	0	4	Advance to knockout stage
3	Uruguay	3	1	1	1	2	2	0	4	
4	Ghana	3	1	0	2	5	7	−2	3	

Source: FIFA
Rules for classification: Group stage tiebreakers

In the round of 16:

- The winners of Group H, Portugal, advanced to play the runners-up of Group G, Switzerland.
- The runners-up of Group H, South Korea, advanced to play the winners of Group G, Brazil.

== Matches ==
All times listed are local, AST (UTC+3).

=== Uruguay vs South Korea ===
The teams had previously met eight times, including twice in the World Cup, both matches won by Uruguay: a 1–0 group stage victory in 1990 and a 2–1 round of 16 success in 2010.

The match ended in a goalless draw, with the best chances coming when Diego Godín and Federico Valverde both hit the post for Uruguay.

24 November 2022
16:00

Uruguay	0–0	South Korea

Education City Stadium, Al Rayyan
Attendance: 41,663
Referee: Clément Turpin (France)

Uruguay	South Korea

GK	23	Sergio Rochet
RB	22	Martín Cáceres	(yellow card) 57'
CB	3	Diego Godín (c)
CB	2	José Giménez
LB	16	Mathías Olivera		(substituted off) 79'
CM	15	Federico Valverde
CM	6	Rodrigo Bentancur
CM	5	Matías Vecino		(substituted off) 79'
RF	8	Facundo Pellistri		(substituted off) 88'
CF	9	Luis Suárez		(substituted off) 64'
LF	11	Darwin Núñez
Substitutions:
FW	21	Edinson Cavani		(substituted on) 64'
MF	7	Nicolás de la Cruz		(substituted on) 79'
DF	17	Matías Viña		(substituted on) 79'
DF	13	Guillermo Varela		(substituted on) 88'
Manager:
Diego Alonso

GK	1	Kim Seung-gyu
RB	15	Kim Moon-hwan
CB	4	Kim Min-jae
CB	19	Kim Young-gwon
LB	3	Kim Jin-su
CM	6	Hwang In-beom
CM	5	Jung Woo-young
RW	17	Na Sang-ho		(substituted off) 74'
AM	10	Lee Jae-sung		(substituted off) 74'
LW	7	Son Heung-min (c)
CF	16	Hwang Ui-jo		(substituted off) 74'
Substitutions:
FW	9	Cho Gue-sung	(yellow card) 88'	(substituted on) 74'
MF	13	Son Jun-ho		(substituted on) 74'
MF	18	Lee Kang-in		(substituted on) 74'
Manager:
(Portugal) Paulo Bento			(yellow card) 90+8'

Man of the Match:
Federico Valverde (Uruguay)

Assistant referees:
Nicolas Danos (France)
Cyril Gringore (France)
Fourth official:
István Kovács (Romania)
Reserve assistant referee:
Vasile Marinescu (Romania)
Video assistant referee:
Jérôme Brisard (France)
Assistant video assistant referees:
Benoît Millot (France)
Djibril Camara (Senegal)
Rédouane Jiyed (Morocco)
Stand-by assistant video assistant referee:
Rafael Foltyn (Germany)

=== Portugal vs Ghana ===
The teams had met once before, being Portugal's 2–1 group stage victory at the 2014 FIFA World Cup.

After a goalless first half, Portugal were awarded a penalty in the 65th minute, when Mohammed Salisu fouled Cristiano Ronaldo in the penalty area. Ronaldo took the penalty and scored, shooting high to the left of the goalkeeper, to put Portugal into the lead. André Ayew equalised for Ghana in the 73rd minute with a close range finish after a low cross from Mohammed Kudus on the left. Portugal swiftly responded with two quick goals from World Cup debutants, the first coming from João Félix in the 78th minute with a clipped finish from the right over the advancing goalkeeper, and the second from substitute Rafael Leão two minutes later with a low finish into the right corner of the goal after a pass from Bruno Fernandes. In the 89th minute, Ghanaian substitute Osman Bukari scored with a header from six yards out to reduce the deficit. Then, in stoppage time, Ghana nearly equalized when Portugal goalkeeper Diogo Costa put the ball on the ground, preparing to kick it upfield, and Ghana's Iñaki Williams came from behind Costa to take the ball but slipped as he was about to shoot, with the ball subsequently cleared from danger by Portugal.

With his goal, Ronaldo became the first male player to score at five different FIFA World Cup tournaments. At the age of 37 years and 292 days, he also became the second-oldest player to score at a World Cup, behind only Roger Milla for Cameroon in 1994 (aged 42 years and 39 days).

24 November 2022
19:00

Portugal	3–2	Ghana
Ronaldo 65' (pen.); Félix 78'; Leão 80'		A. Ayew 73'; Bukari 89'

Stadium 974, Doha
Attendance: 42,662
Referee: Ismail Elfath (United States)

Portugal	Ghana

GK	22	Diogo Costa
RB	20	João Cancelo
CB	4	Rúben Dias
CB	13	Danilo Pereira	(yellow card) 90+1'
LB	5	Raphaël Guerreiro
DM	18	Rúben Neves		(substituted off) 77'
CM	8	Bruno Fernandes	(yellow card) 90+5'
CM	25	Otávio		(substituted off) 56'
AM	10	Bernardo Silva		(substituted off) 88'
CF	11	João Félix		(substituted off) 88'
CF	7	Cristiano Ronaldo (c)		(substituted off) 88'
Substitutions:
MF	14	William Carvalho		(substituted on) 56'
FW	15	Rafael Leão		(substituted on) 77'
MF	6	João Palhinha		(substituted on) 88'
FW	26	Gonçalo Ramos		(substituted on) 88'
MF	17	João Mário		(substituted on) 88'
Manager:
Fernando Santos

GK	1	Lawrence Ati-Zigi
CB	18	Daniel Amartey
CB	23	Alexander Djiku		(substituted off) 90+2'
CB	4	Mohammed Salisu
RWB	26	Alidu Seidu	(yellow card) 57'	(substituted off) 66'
LWB	17	Baba Rahman
CM	5	Thomas Partey
CM	20	Mohammed Kudus	(yellow card) 45+1'	(substituted off) 77'
CM	21	Salis Abdul Samed		(substituted off) 90+2'
CF	10	André Ayew (c)	(yellow card) 49'	(substituted off) 77'
CF	19	Iñaki Williams	(yellow card) 90+1'
Substitutions:
DF	2	Tariq Lamptey		(substituted on) 66'
MF	11	Osman Bukari		(substituted on) 77'
FW	9	Jordan Ayew		(substituted on) 77'
MF	8	Daniel-Kofi Kyereh		(substituted on) 90+2'
FW	25	Antoine Semenyo		(substituted on) 90+2'
Manager:
Otto Addo

Man of the Match:
Cristiano Ronaldo (Portugal)

Assistant referees:
Kyle Atkins (United States)
Corey Parker (United States)
Fourth official:
Stéphanie Frappart (France)
Reserve assistant referee:
Karen Díaz Medina (Mexico)
Video assistant referee:
Armando Villarreal (United States)
Assistant video assistant referees:
Drew Fischer (Canada)
Alessandro Giallatini (Italy)
Shaun Evans (Australia)
Stand-by assistant video assistant referee:
Elvis Noupue (Cameroon)

=== South Korea vs Ghana ===
The teams had faced each other eight times, most recently in 2014, 4–0 friendly win by Ghana.

In the first half, Ghana scored two goals against the run of play within a ten-minute span to take a 2–0 lead, coming from Mohammed Salisu and Mohammed Kudus. South Korea would then reply in the second half with two goals of their own, both headers scored within three minutes of each other by Cho Gue-sung, to level the game at 2–2. Kudus scored the decisive goal and his second of the match in the 68th minute, coming after Iñaki Williams had mistimed his initial shot, to put Ghana back in front. Ghanaian goalkeeper Lawrence Ati-Zigi made multiple crucial saves and Salisu cleared an effort off the line late on to secure them a 3–2 victory.

Cho Gue-sung and Kudus each became the first players to score multiple goals in a single World Cup match for their respective countries.

When referee Anthony Taylor ended the game instead of allowing a South Korean player to kick off a corner, South Korea's head coach Paulo Bento ran onto the field and screamed at the referee, for which he was shown a red card, making it the first time in World Cup history that a coach was sent off after the conclusion of the match. Counting players' Leandro Cufré's and Josip Šimunić's red cards (both in 2006), this was the third time a sending off occurred after the match had ended.

28 November 2022
16:00

South Korea	2–3	Ghana
Cho Gue-sung 58', 61'		Salisu 24'; Kudus 34', 68'

Education City Stadium, Al Rayyan
Attendance: 43,983
Referee: Anthony Taylor (England)

South Korea	Ghana

GK	1	Kim Seung-gyu
RB	15	Kim Moon-hwan
CB	4	Kim Min-jae		(substituted off) 90+2'
CB	19	Kim Young-gwon	(yellow card) 77'
LB	3	Kim Jin-su
CM	6	Hwang In-beom
CM	5	Jung Woo-young	(yellow card) 27'	(substituted off) 78'
RW	22	Kwon Chang-hoon		(substituted off) 57'
AM	25	Jeong Woo-yeong		(substituted off) 46'
LW	7	Son Heung-min (c)
CF	9	Cho Gue-sung
Substitutions:
MF	17	Na Sang-ho		(substituted on) 46'
MF	18	Lee Kang-in		(substituted on) 57'
FW	16	Hwang Ui-jo		(substituted on) 78'
DF	20	Kwon Kyung-won		(substituted on) 90+2'
Manager:
(Portugal) Paulo Bento			(red card) 90+12'

GK	1	Lawrence Ati-Zigi
RB	2	Tariq Lamptey	(yellow card) 73'	(substituted off) 78'
CB	18	Daniel Amartey	(yellow card) 21'
CB	4	Mohammed Salisu
LB	14	Gideon Mensah		(substituted off) 88'
DM	21	Salis Abdul Samed
CM	5	Thomas Partey
CM	20	Mohammed Kudus		(substituted off) 83'
RF	10	André Ayew (c)		(substituted off) 78'
CF	19	Iñaki Williams
LF	9	Jordan Ayew		(substituted off) 78'
Substitutions:
MF	22	Kamaldeen Sulemana		(substituted on) 78'
MF	8	Daniel-Kofi Kyereh		(substituted on) 78'
DF	3	Denis Odoi		(substituted on) 78'
DF	23	Alexander Djiku		(substituted on) 83'
DF	17	Baba Rahman		(substituted on) 88'
Manager:
Otto Addo

Man of the Match:
Mohammed Kudus (Ghana)

Assistant referees:
Gary Beswick (England)
Adam Nunn (England)
Fourth official:
Kevin Ortega (Peru)
Reserve assistant referee:
Michael Orué (Peru)
Video assistant referee:
Tomasz Kwiatkowski (Poland)
Assistant video assistant referees:
Alejandro Hernández Hernández (Spain)
Kyle Atkins (United States)
Ricardo de Burgos Bengoetxea (Spain)
Stand-by assistant video assistant referee:
Corey Parker (United States)

=== Portugal vs Uruguay ===
The teams had met three times prior, including Uruguay's 2–1 round of 16 victory at the 2018 FIFA World Cup.

Bruno Fernandes put Portugal into the lead during the second half when his cross from the left deceived Uruguay keeper Sergio Rochet, after Cristiano Ronaldo had tried to glance the ball past him with his head. Ronaldo was initially ruled as the goalscorer before FIFA determined that he hadn't connected with the ball, and instead awarded the goal to Fernandes. Fernandes scored a second in the third minute of stoppage time, a penalty awarded by the VAR for handball by José Giménez, which he rolled into the left side of the net. With this victory, Portugal secured a place in the knockout stage.

28 November 2022
22:00

Portugal	2–0	Uruguay
Fernandes 54', 90+3' (pen.)

Lusail Stadium, Lusail
Attendance: 88,668
Referee: Alireza Faghani (Iran)

Portugal	Uruguay

GK	22	Diogo Costa
RB	20	João Cancelo
CB	4	Rúben Dias	(yellow card) 89'
CB	3	Pepe
LB	19	Nuno Mendes		(substituted off) 42'
DM	18	Rúben Neves	(yellow card) 38'	(substituted off) 69'
CM	10	Bernardo Silva
CM	14	William Carvalho		(substituted off) 82'
AM	8	Bruno Fernandes
CF	7	Cristiano Ronaldo (c)		(substituted off) 82'
CF	11	João Félix	(yellow card) 77'	(substituted off) 82'
Substitutions:
DF	5	Raphaël Guerreiro		(substituted on) 42'
FW	15	Rafael Leão		(substituted on) 69'
MF	23	Matheus Nunes		(substituted on) 82'
FW	26	Gonçalo Ramos		(substituted on) 82'
MF	6	João Palhinha		(substituted on) 82'
Manager:
Fernando Santos

GK	23	Sergio Rochet
CB	2	José Giménez
CB	3	Diego Godín (c)		(substituted off) 62'
CB	19	Sebastián Coates
DM	6	Rodrigo Bentancur	(yellow card) 6'
CM	15	Federico Valverde
CM	5	Matías Vecino		(substituted off) 62'
RW	13	Guillermo Varela
LW	16	Mathías Olivera	(yellow card) 44'	(substituted off) 86'
CF	11	Darwin Núñez		(substituted off) 72'
CF	21	Edinson Cavani		(substituted off) 72'
Substitutions:
FW	8	Facundo Pellistri		(substituted on) 62'
MF	10	Giorgian de Arrascaeta		(substituted on) 62'
FW	18	Maxi Gómez		(substituted on) 72'
FW	9	Luis Suárez		(substituted on) 72'
DF	17	Matías Viña		(substituted on) 86'
Manager:
Diego Alonso

Man of the Match:
Bruno Fernandes (Portugal)

Assistant referees:
Mohammadreza Mansouri (Iran)
Mohammadreza Abolfazli (Iran)
Fourth official:
Abdulrahman Al-Jassim (Qatar)
Reserve assistant referee:
Saud Al-Maqaleh (Qatar)
Video assistant referee:
Abdulla Al-Marri (Qatar)
Assistant video assistant referees:
Shaun Evans (Australia)
Anton Shchetinin (Australia)
Rédouane Jiyed (Morocco)
Stand-by assistant video assistant referee:
Ashley Beecham (Australia)

=== Ghana vs Uruguay ===
The teams had one prior meeting, which came in the 2010 FIFA World Cup quarter-finals; Uruguay won 4–2 on penalties following a 1–1 draw after extra time.

In the first half, Ghana were awarded a penalty after Uruguay goalkeeper Sergio Rochet was adjudged to have fouled Mohammed Kudus inside the area; however, Rochet then saved the subsequent spot kick taken by Ghana captain André Ayew. Shortly after this, midfielder Giorgian de Arrascaeta scored Uruguay's first two goals of the tournament within a span of six minutes to earn his side a 2–0 half-time lead, which saw them rise to second place in the live group standings. However, Uruguay would then be pushed down to third in the table on goals scored following South Korea's winner against Portugal late into the second half of the group's other ongoing game. Uruguay were unable to find the third goal they now required to advance, with Ghana keeper Lawrence Ati-Zigi making saves late on to deny both Edinson Cavani and Maxi Gómez, and thus failed to progress past the first round for the first time since 2002. Defeat also saw Ghana eliminated, finishing bottom of the group with only three points.

Referee Daniel Siebert and his assistants were angrily confronted by Uruguayan players following the final whistle, after both Siebert and the VAR had disagreed with Uruguay's penalty appeals in the second half: first for a coming together between Darwin Núñez and Ghana's Alidu Seidu, and then in stoppage time after Cavani went down in the area. In January 2023, FIFA would go on to punish several Uruguayan players for their actions in the aftermath of the contest, deeming their behaviour "discriminatory", "offensive", and a "violation of the principles of fair play"; substitute keeper Fernando Muslera and defender José Giménez both received four-match bans, while Cavani and captain Diego Godín each served a one-game suspension. All four players were also required to pay fines along with the nation's football association, and carry out a form of football community service.

With De Arrascaeta's goals, Uruguay became the last team of all 32 participants to score at the 2022 FIFA World Cup.

2 December 2022
18:00

Ghana	0–2	Uruguay
		De Arrascaeta 26', 32'

Al Janoub Stadium, Al Wakrah
Attendance: 43,443
Referee: Daniel Siebert (Germany)

Ghana	Uruguay

GK	1	Lawrence Ati-Zigi
RB	26	Alidu Seidu	(yellow card) 90+9'
CB	18	Daniel Amartey
CB	4	Mohammed Salisu
LB	17	Baba Rahman
CM	5	Thomas Partey
CM	21	Salis Abdul Samed		(substituted off) 72'
RW	20	Mohammed Kudus		(substituted off) 90+8'
AM	10	André Ayew (c)		(substituted off) 46'
LW	9	Jordan Ayew		(substituted off) 46'
CF	19	Iñaki Williams		(substituted off) 72'
Substitutions:
MF	22	Kamaldeen Sulemana	(yellow card) 86'	(substituted on) 46'
MF	11	Osman Bukari		(substituted on) 46'
FW	25	Antoine Semenyo		(substituted on) 72'
MF	8	Daniel-Kofi Kyereh		(substituted on) 72'
MF	7	Abdul Fatawu Issahaku		(substituted on) 90+8'
Manager:
Otto Addo

GK	23	Sergio Rochet
RB	13	Guillermo Varela
CB	2	José Giménez	(yellow card) 90+10'
CB	19	Sebastián Coates	(yellow card) 87'
LB	16	Mathías Olivera
RM	8	Facundo Pellistri		(substituted off) 66'
CM	15	Federico Valverde
CM	6	Rodrigo Bentancur		(substituted off) 34'
LM	10	Giorgian de Arrascaeta		(substituted off) 80'
CF	9	Luis Suárez (c)	(yellow card) 60'	(substituted off) 66'
CF	11	Darwin Núñez	(yellow card) 20'	(substituted off) 80'
Substitutions:
MF	5	Matías Vecino		(substituted on) 34'
FW	21	Edinson Cavani	(yellow card) 90+10'	(substituted on) 66'
MF	7	Nicolás de la Cruz		(substituted on) 66'
FW	18	Maxi Gómez		(substituted on) 80'
MF	24	Agustín Canobbio		(substituted on) 80'
Manager:
Diego Alonso

Man of the Match:
Giorgian de Arrascaeta (Uruguay)

Assistant referees:
Jan Seidel (Germany)
Rafael Foltyn (Germany)
Fourth official:
Yoshimi Yamashita (Japan)
Reserve assistant referee:
Vasile Marinescu (Romania)
Video assistant referee:
Bastian Dankert (Germany)
Assistant video assistant referees:
Pol van Boekel (Netherlands)
Ciro Carbone (Italy)
Paolo Valeri (Italy)
Stand-by assistant video assistant referee:
Alessandro Giallatini (Italy)

=== South Korea vs Portugal ===
Prior to this match, the teams had met once before, being South Korea's 1–0 group stage victory in the 2002 FIFA World Cup (which they co-hosted with Japan).

A rotated Portugal side took the lead in the opening five minutes, when Ricardo Horta scored on his World Cup debut with a first-time shot. South Korea would equalize in the 27th minute, when Portugal failed to clear a corner which hit the back of Cristiano Ronaldo, landing at the feet of Kim Young-gwon who scored from close range. In a second half where both sides saw opportunities, South Korea would find the winner in stoppage time, after Son Heung-min recovered the ball off a counter from a Portugal corner and slipped it to Hwang Hee-chan, who finished his shot into the bottom corner of the net.

This late victory saw South Korea leapfrog Uruguay in the group standings on goals scored to join Portugal in the knockout stage, progressing to the second round for the first time since 2010.

2 December 2022
18:00

South Korea	2–1	Portugal
Kim Young-gwon 27'; Hwang Hee-chan 90+1'		Horta 5'

Education City Stadium, Al Rayyan
Attendance: 44,097
Referee: Facundo Tello (Argentina)

South Korea	Portugal

GK	1	Kim Seung-gyu
RB	15	Kim Moon-hwan
CB	20	Kwon Kyung-won
CB	19	Kim Young-gwon		(substituted off) 81'
LB	3	Kim Jin-su
DM	5	Jung Woo-young
CM	6	Hwang In-beom
CM	18	Lee Kang-in	(yellow card) 36'	(substituted off) 81'
RF	10	Lee Jae-sung		(substituted off) 65'
CF	9	Cho Gue-sung		(substituted off) 90+3'
LF	7	Son Heung-min (c)
Substitutions:
MF	11	Hwang Hee-chan	(yellow card) 90+2'	(substituted on) 65'
FW	16	Hwang Ui-jo		(substituted on) 81'
MF	13	Son Jun-ho		(substituted on) 81'
DF	24	Cho Yu-min		(substituted on) 90+3'
Manager:
(Portugal) Sérgio Costa (Note: South Korea manager Paulo Bento was suspended for the match due to his sending off in South Korea's match against Ghana. Assistant manager Sérgio Costa filled in as manager.)

GK	22	Diogo Costa
RB	2	Diogo Dalot
CB	3	Pepe
CB	24	António Silva
LB	20	João Cancelo
DM	18	Rúben Neves	(substituted off) 65'
CM	23	Matheus Nunes	(substituted off) 65'
CM	16	Vitinha	(substituted off) 81'
RF	21	Ricardo Horta
CF	7	Cristiano Ronaldo (c)	(substituted off) 65'
LF	17	João Mário	(substituted off) 81'
Substitutions:
MF	6	João Palhinha	(substituted on) 65'
FW	15	Rafael Leão	(substituted on) 65'
FW	9	André Silva	(substituted on) 65'
FW	10	Bernardo Silva	(substituted on) 81'
MF	14	William Carvalho	(substituted on) 81'
Manager:
Fernando Santos

Man of the Match:
Hwang Hee-chan (South Korea)

Assistant referees:
Ezequiel Brailovsky (Argentina)
Gabriel Chade (Argentina)
Fourth official:
Maguette Ndiaye (Senegal)
Reserve assistant referee:
Djibril Camara (Senegal)
Video assistant referee:
Nicolás Gallo (Colombia)
Assistant video assistant referees:
Juan Soto (Venezuela)
Bruno Boschilia (Brazil)
Armando Villarreal (United States)
Stand-by assistant video assistant referee:
Bruno Pires (Brazil)

== Discipline ==
Fair play points would have been used as tiebreakers if the overall and head-to-head records of teams were tied. These were calculated based on yellow and red cards received in all group matches as follows:

- first yellow card: −1 point;
- indirect red card (second yellow card): −3 points;
- direct red card: −4 points;
- yellow card and direct red card: −5 points;

Only one of the above deductions was applied to a player in a single match.

Team	Match 1				Match 2				Match 3				Points
Team	Booked	(yellow card) (yellow-red card)	Sent off (straight red)	(yellow card) (red card)	Booked	(yellow card) (yellow-red card)	Sent off (straight red)	(yellow card) (red card)	Booked	(yellow card) (yellow-red card)	Sent off (straight red)	(yellow card) (red card)	Points
Portugal	2				3								−5
South Korea	1				2				2				−5
Ghana	4				2				2				−8
Uruguay	1				2				5				−8

== See also ==
- Ghana at the FIFA World Cup – International football delegation
- Portugal at the FIFA World Cup – International football delegation
- South Korea at the FIFA World Cup – International football delegation
- Uruguay at the FIFA World Cup – International football delegation
