= Rafael Leão =

Portuguese footballer (born 1999)

- Leão with Portugal in 2026

Personal information
- Full name: Rafael Alexandre da Conceição Leão
- Date of birth: 10 June 1999 (age 27)
- Place of birth: Seixal, Portugal
- Height: 1.88 m (6 ft 2 in)
- Position: Left winger

Team information
- Current team: Galatasaray
- Number: 27

Youth career
- 2006–2007: Amora
- 2007–2008: Foot 21
- 2008–2017: Sporting CP

Senior career*
| Years | Team | Apps | (Gls) |
| 2017–2018 | Sporting CP B | 12 | (7) |
| 2017–2018 | Sporting CP | 4 | (1) |
| 2018–2019 | Lille | 26 | (8) |
| 2019–2026 | AC Milan | 227 | (64) |
| 2026– | Galatasaray | 8 | (2) |

International career^{‡}
| 2014–2016 | Portugal U16 | 10 | (2) |
| 2015–2016 | Portugal U17 | 11 | (4) |
| 2016–2017 | Portugal U19 | 17 | (5) |
| 2017–2019 | Portugal U20 | 8 | (2) |
| 2017–2021 | Portugal U21 | 15 | (1) |
| 2021– | Portugal | 51 | (6) |
Medal record
Men's football
Representing Portugal
UEFA Nations League
| Winner | 2025 Germany |
UEFA European U21 Championship
| Runner-up | 2021 Hungary–Slovenia |
UEFA European U19 Championship
| Runner-up | 2017 Georgia |
UEFA European U17 Championship
| Winner | 2016 Azerbaijan |
- * Club domestic league appearances and goals as of 21:58, 7 November 2026 (UTC) ‡ National team caps and goals as of 23:30, 1 October 2026 (UTC)

Rafael Alexandre da Conceição "Rafa" Leão (Portuguese pronunciation: [ʁɐfɐˈɛl ˈljɐ̃w]; born 10 June 1999) is a Portuguese professional footballer who plays as a left winger for Süper Lig club Galatasaray and the Portugal national team. He is known for his dribbling and speed.

Graduating from Sporting CP youth system, Leão made his first-team debut in 2018, winning the 2017–18 Taça da Liga, before unilaterally terminating his contract, following an incident involving a hostile mob of ultras fans within the club's facilities. Shortly after, he joined Ligue 1 side Lille on a free transfer. After one season with the club, Italian side AC Milan signed him in August 2019, winning the 2021–22 Serie A, being named that season's Most Valuable Player. In 2026, after seven seasons with Milan, Leão joined Turkish side Galatasaray.

Leão is a former Portugal youth international, representing his country at various youth levels, being part of the under-17 team that won the 2016 European Championship. He made his senior international debut in 2021, and was part of Portugal's squads for two FIFA World Cups (2022 and 2026) and the UEFA Euro 2024. He also won the UEFA Nations League in 2025.

== Early life ==
Leão was born on 10 June 1999 in Seixal, Portugal, a city located in the Lisbon Metropolitan Area. The son of an Angolan father and a São Toméan mother who met in mainland Portugal, he was raised in Amora and has three siblings. His paternal surname means "lion" in the Portuguese language.

== Club career ==
=== Sporting CP ===
Leão joined Sporting CP's youth system at the age of 10 after a brief spell in Amora and Foot 21. On 21 May 2017, still a junior, he made his senior debut with the reserves, coming on as a second-half substitute and scoring in a 1–1 away draw against Braga B.

Courtesy of manager Jorge Jesus, Leão first appeared in the Primeira Liga with the first team on 11 February 2018, replacing Bryan Ruiz for the last 21 minutes of the 2–0 home win over Feirense. On 2 March, having taken the place of injured Seydou Doumbia late into the first half, he equalised for the visitors a few minutes after taking the pitch but in a 2–1 away loss to Porto– in the process, he became the club's youngest-ever scorer against that opposition.

On 14 June 2018, Leão unilaterally terminated his contract with Sporting Clube de Portugal, citing the May 2018 attack where players and staff of Sporting were brutally attacked by a mob of about 50 club supporters on the premises of Sporting's training facility in Alcochete.

=== Lille ===
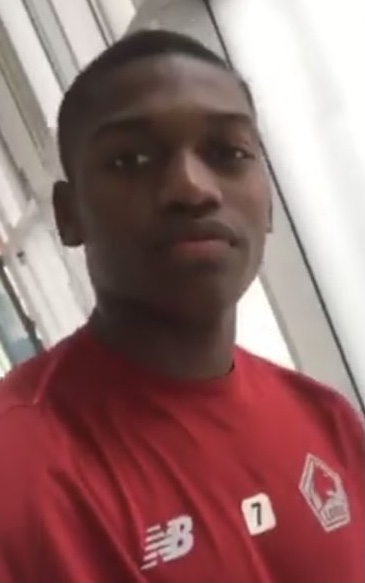
Leão with Lille in 2018

On 8 August 2018, Leão joined French club Lille on a free transfer, signing a five-year deal. Sporting CP would later dispute Lille's deal to sign the player, deeming the transfer "unacceptable", filing a complaint with FIFA and claiming the €45 million of his release clause. At the beginning of September 2018, Leão wanted to terminate his contract with the club, after his transfer was not approved by the Ligue de Football Professionnel (LFP), due to sanctions imposed by the Direction Nationale du Contrôle de Gestion (DNCG), following Lille's financial difficulties. After being convinced by his representative to stay at Lille, the DNCG validated Lille's pending contracts, including the contract of Leão.

Leão made his competitive debut on 30 September 2018, replacing Loïc Rémy in the 78th minute, in a 3–0 home win over Marseille. He scored his first Ligue 1 goal in only his second appearance, playing 67 minutes and helping the hosts defeat Caen in a 1–0 victory. On 1 February 2019, he scored his sixth goal of the season and made an assist to Nicolas Pépé, his first for the club, in a 4–0 home win over Nice.

During his spell, Leão scored a total of eight goals in 26 competitive games, being mainly used as a striker by Lille coach Christophe Galtier, and shared teams with compatriots José Fonte, Rui Fonte, Edgar Ié and Xeka, as they finished as runners-up in a brilliant 2018–19 Ligue 1 season.

=== AC Milan ===
==== 2019–21: Adaptation to Italy ====
On 1 August 2019, Leão signed a five-year contract at AC Milan for a fee of €35 million plus a 20% sell-on clause. He made his Serie A debut on 25 August, replacing Samu Castillejo in 75th-minute in a 1–0 away defeat to Udinese. Leão scored his first goal of the club, as a late consolation in a 1–3 home loss to Fiorentina on 29 September. On 19 March 2020, the Court of Arbitration for Sport (CAS) condemned Leão to pay €16.5 million to Sporting CP for his unilateral breach of contract. On 7 July, Leão scored a goal against league-leaders Juventus, to help Milan to a 4–2 win, after being down by two goals. At the end of the season, he had scored six goals in 31 league matches, helping Milan to a sixth-place finish and a 10-match unbeaten streak.

At the beginning of the following season, on 4 October, Leão scored a brace in a 3–0 home victory at San Siro against Spezia. On 29 October, he scored his first goal in European competitions, in a 3–0 home group stage victory in the UEFA Europa League against Sparta Prague. He scored the fastest goal in the history of Serie A and in Europe's top-five leagues, after six seconds on 20 December at Sassuolo; the match ended 2–1 for his team.

On 3 January 2021, he scored the second goal against Benevento in eventual 2–0 away win, becoming the second youngest foreign player (21 years and 207 days) to score more than ten goals for Milan in Serie A, after Alexandre Pato (19 years and 19 days).

==== 2021–22: Breakthrough and Serie A champion ====
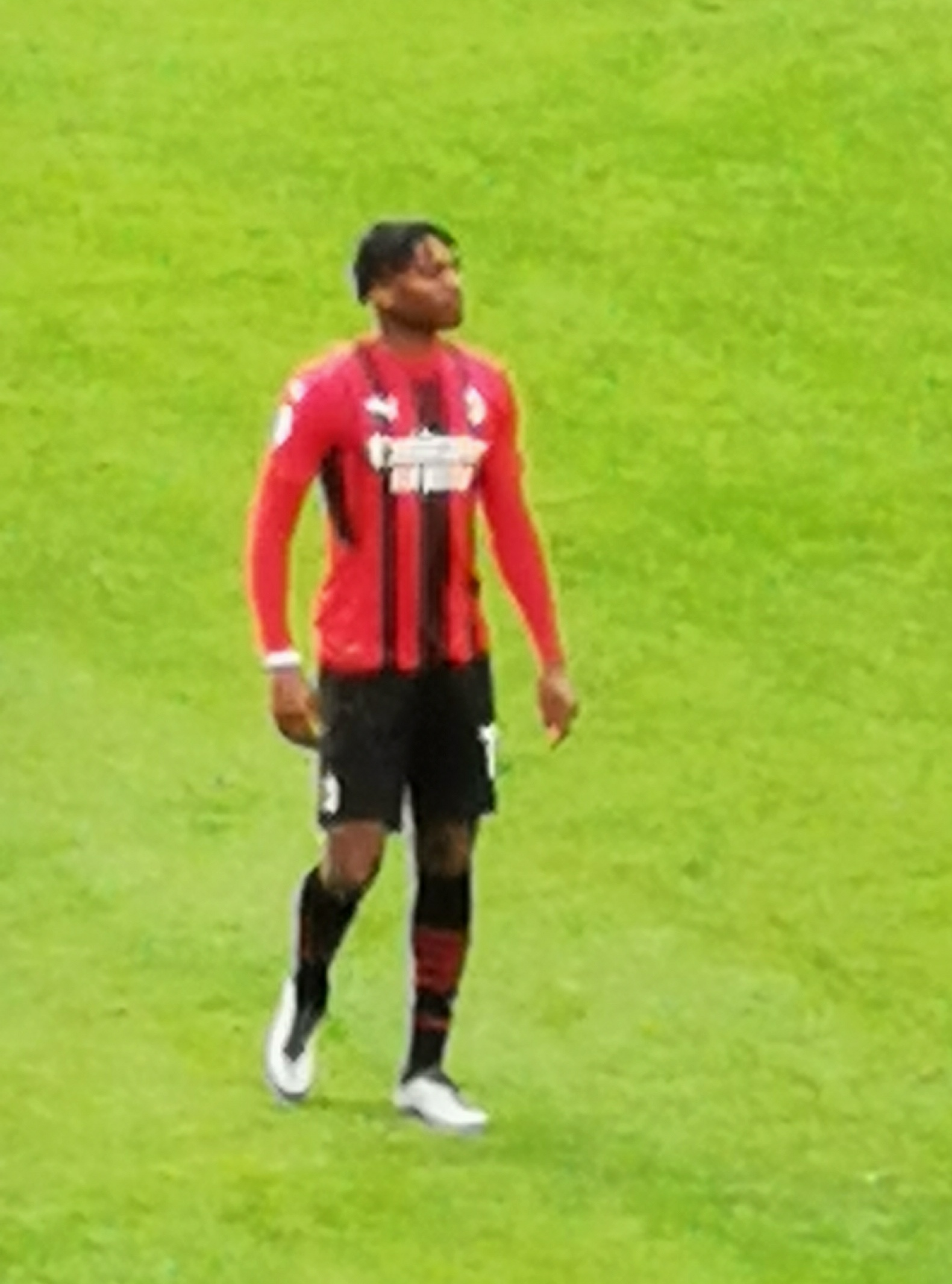
Leão playing for AC Milan in 2022

At the start of the 2021–22 season, on 29 August, Leão scored the first goal from a shot outside the box, in a 4–1 home victory against Cagliari at San Siro. On 15 September, on in his UEFA Champions League debut, he provided an assist for Ante Rebić in a 3–2 away defeat to Liverpool; and on 28 September, he scored his first goal in the competition in a 2–1 home loss against Atlético Madrid.

On 9 February 2022, Leão opened the score sheet against Lazio and assisted the second goal, being directly involved in 14 goals in the season, surpassing his record during his career in Europe's the top 5 leagues. Four days later, in his 100th appearance for Milan, he scored the only goal in 1–0 win against Sampdoria, which put Milan in the top of the league table. On 25 February, he scored his eighth league goal of the season against Udinese, in an eventual 1–1 draw, becoming in the process the second player to score in each of the seven days of a week in Serie A with AC Milan, after Andriy Shevchenko.

On 1 May, Leão scored the winner in a 1–0 win against Fiorentina, becoming the youngest Portuguese to score at least 10 goals in a single Serie A campaign. Seven days later, Leão's two assists to Sandro Tonali helped his team come from behind to defeat Hellas Verona 3–1 away from home, allowing his side to overtake rivals Inter at the top of the Serie A table. On 22 May, he provided a hat-trick of assists for the first time in his career as Milan beat Sassuolo 3–0 away from home to win their first Serie A title in eleven years. At the end of the season, Leão was awarded the Serie A MVP award for the 2021–22 season, finishing the campaign with 11 goals and 10 assists. Leão also established himself as one of the best dribblers (186) in Serie A and the 3rd best among European players after Vinícius Júnior (210) and Allan Saint-Maximin (205).

==== 2022–23: Champions League semi-finals and contract extension ====
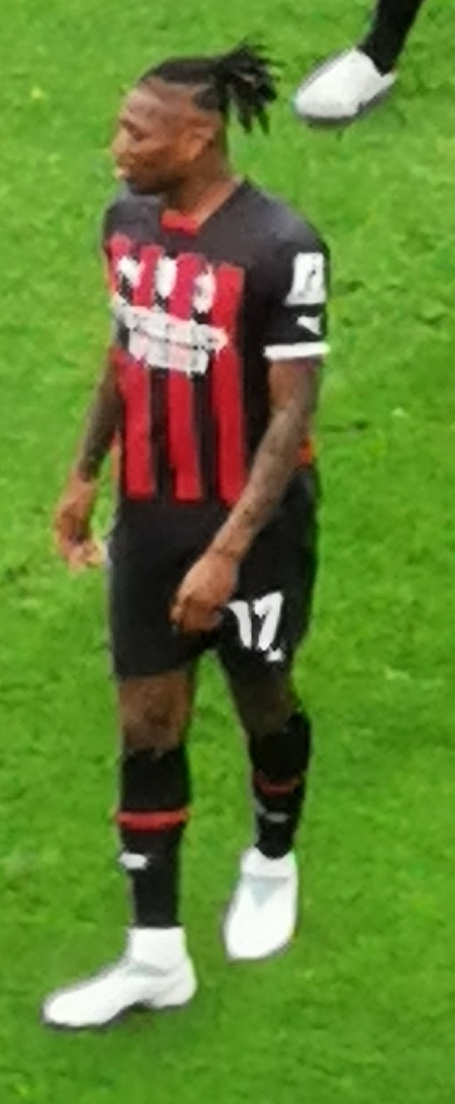
Leão appearing for AC Milan in a Serie A match against Lecce during the 2022–23 season

Leão started the 2022–23 season by scoring and providing an assist in a 2–0 home win against Bologna on 27 August. On 3 September, on his 100th appearance in Serie A, he scored a brace and provided an assist to Olivier Giroud in a 3–2 win against crosstown rivals Inter in the Derby della Madonnina; his second goal won him the Serie A Goal of the Month award for September. On 10 September, Leão was sent off for the first time in his club career, after being booked twice, for violent conduct (kicking the head of Alex Ferrari, while attempting to perform an acrobatic bicycle kick) early in the second half of Milan's 2–1 win over Sampdoria. During this time, in October, Leão was one of the 30 candidates who was nominated for the 2022 Ballon d'Or, being placed 14th place in the voting polls, the highest Portuguese player ranked in the voting list. Later that month, Leão was named Serie A Player of the Month.

On 2 April 2023, Leão scored a brace in a 4–0 away win over league leaders Napoli, to be the latter's biggest defeat since losing 5–1 to Atalanta in the 2007–08 season. On 18 April, he provided an assist to Olivier Giroud following a solo run, to be later named player of the match, in a 1–1 away draw against the same opponent in the 2022–23 UEFA Champions League quarter-final second leg, which secured his team's progress to the semi-final, by winning 2–1 on aggregate, for the first time since the 2006–07 season. Being injured and withdrawing from the semi-final first leg against Inter, he played in the 1–0 second leg loss and witnessed arch-rivals booking a place in the Champions League final for the first time since 2010.

Two days before the 2022–23 season final round, Leão extended his contract with AC Milan until 2028. According to various columnists and reporters, the financial details of his contract include an annual income of €5 to €7 million per season (depending on add-ons), a €1.5 million signing bonus and a €175 million release clause that can be activated only during the summer transfer windows. Previous Leão's club Lille also kept a sell-on clause and an interest throughout a future transfer deal. Furthermore, the French side agreed to help the deal along and pay €19.6 million, out of a total €20.6 million fee, as a compensation to Sporting CP whereas Leão paid the remaining one million, for the termination of his contract with them. A payment AC Milan committed to refund to Lille up to 90% of the overall amount.

==== 2023–24: Inheritance of number 10 shirt and Serie A top assist provider ====
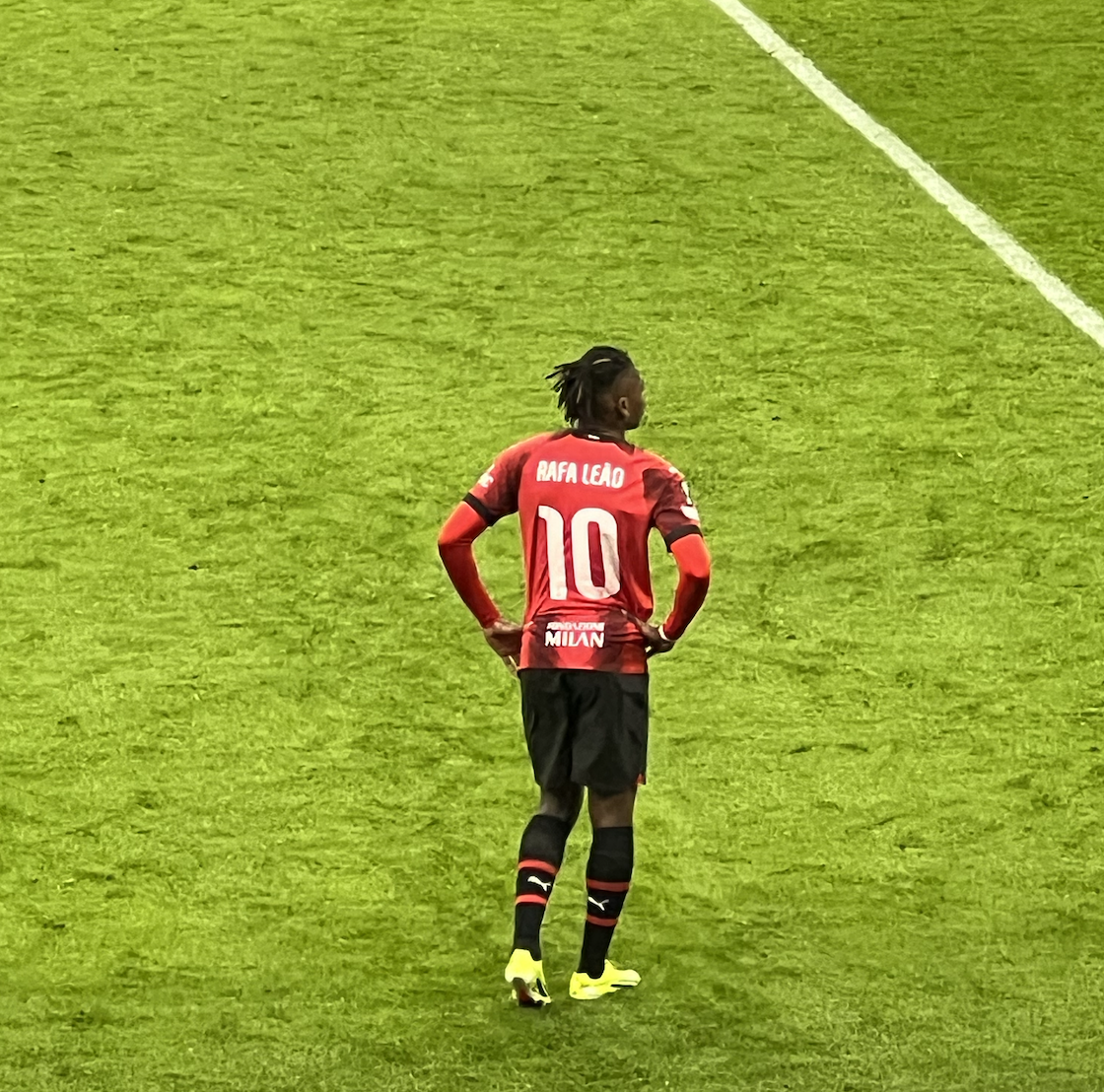
Leão with the newly given number 10 shirt in 2024

Prior to the 2023–24 season, Leão was given the squad number 10 following the departure of Brahim Díaz, who returned from his loan spell from Real Madrid, the club's previous number 10. The shirt had also previously been worn in the Serie A by former Milan players, most notably Clarence Seedorf, Gianni Rivera, Roberto Baggio, Rui Costa, and Ruud Gullit.

Leão scored his first goal of the new season on 1 September, netting an acrobatic bicycle kick in a 2–1 home league win over Roma. On 23 September, he captained Milan for the first time in a home win over Hellas Verona, scoring the first goal of a 1–0 win. Over the following months, Leão was criticized for his performances, most notably in Milan's Champions League group stage match against Newcastle United, which ended in a 0–0 draw. However, Leão regained his form in the month of November, scoring his second bicycle kick of the season in 2–1 win over Paris Saint-Germain on matchday four of the group stage of the Champions League on 9 November, which later helped them qualify to the Europa League knock-out round play-offs, after they finished third in their group, although Leão missed their last group stage matches due to a hamstring injury.

In the Europa League, Leão helped his team reach the quarter finals of the competition, scoring two goals in the knockout round play-offs against Rennes in a 5–3 aggregate win. In the round of 16, he scored one goal and provided two assists in a 7–3 aggregate win over Slavia Praga, helping Milan reach the quarter finals of the competition. On 30 March, Leão made his 200th appearance for the club, scoring and assisting in a 2–1 away win over Fiorentina. On 5 May, Leão was whistled by sections of the Milan fans upon being substituted against Genoa, after which he headed straight to the dressing room. On 11 May, Leão came on as a substitute and scored and assisted in a 5–1 win over Cagliari to become the second fastest player to reach 50 goals and 50 assists for the club after Kaká. Leão created the most big chances (18) in the 2023–24 Serie A and finished the season as Serie A's top assist provider, alongside Paulo Dybala with 9 assists and scored 9 goals, being named in the Serie A Team of the Season.

==== 2024–26: Later years and departure ====
Starting the new season, Leão began a rift with new manager Paulo Fonseca, due to Fonseca's dissatisfaction with Leão's off-the-ball work rate and defensive contributions. As Milan struggled for form in Serie A, Fonseca opted to bench Leão for several matches, favoring players like Noah Okafor, who were perceived to offer more balance to the team's structure. The turning point in the relationship between Leão and Fonseca was during Milan's Champions League league phase match against Real Madrid on 5 November, where he assisted the third goal in a 3–1 win at the Santiago Bernabéu. Four days later, he scored twice in a 3–3 draw against Cagliari, netting his 50th Serie A goal in the process, with his last brace for the club being in June 2023. On 13 November, while he was away on international duty for Portugal, he confirmed he and Fonseca had settled their issues.

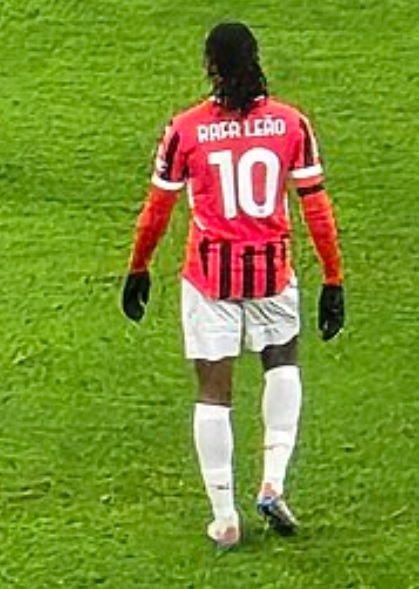
Leão playing for Milan during the 2024–25 Serie A season

On 6 January 2025, Leão won the 2024–25 Supercoppa Italiana against rivals Inter Milan, under the new coach, Sérgio Conceição (who replaced Paulo Fonseca), after coming on as a substitute, he created both winning goals in an eventual 3–2 comeback victory, securing his second trophy with AC Milan. However, despite an initial improvement, his inconsistencies returned. Over the following months, it was reported that he had fallen out of favour with Conceição, leading him to be benched for Milan's final matches of the season, where on 29 May, they were defeated by Bologna in the Coppa Italia final and also finished eighth-place in Serie A, failing to qualify for any European competition.

In the 2025–26 season, Massimiliano Allegri arrived as the new manager and shifted him and teammate Christian Pulisic primarily into centralized striker positions away from their typical winger positions. Despite early commitments to Allegri's tactical system, most notably scoring in a 2–1 league home win over Fiorentina on 19 October, he was still criticized for missing important chances in the previous league match against Juventus, which ended in a draw, with Allegri wanting more intensity and responsibility from him. Soon after, his form dropped with injuries taking away his explosiveness, causing limited or inconsistent play with Allegri's tactical demands worsening their relationship. On 15 March, after a defeat to Lazio, Leão reacted badly to being substituted, showing frustration with teammates for not finding him with passes. By the end of the season, the team's form collapsed, leading AC Milan to miss out on Champions League qualification for a second straight season.

On 30 May 2026, in an interview with Sport TV, Leão revealed that he carried the injury with him for 4–5 months, claiming that the tactical system used during the season did not suit him. He also chose to bring his time at the club to an end, announcing that "he was ready to play in a another league and try a new challenge", feeling that the Premier League or La Liga would be competitions where his talent would be valued the most.

=== Galatasaray ===
On 29 August 2026, Turkish Süper Lig giants Galatasaray announced the initiation of official negotiations with Leão and his club, AC Milan, regarding his imminent transfer. He arrived in Istanbul on the same day. On 30 August, he signed a four-year contract with Galatasaray, for a transfer fee of €38 million. Leão confirmed that he had rejected a move to Aston Villa in favour of Galatasaray, saying that Galatasaray had been pushing to complete the deal since June and credited president Dursun Özbek, vice-president Niyazi Yelkencioğlu and his agent Jorge Mendes for helping to make the transfer happen.

== International career ==
Leao playing for Portugal at the 2026 FIFA World Cup

=== Youth career ===
With the Portugal under-17s, Leão participated in the 2016 UEFA European Under-17 Championship. In this competition, he played five out of six matches, not playing against the Netherlands in the semifinals. In the finals against Spain, Leão replaced Domingos Quina in the 79th minute; Portugal went on to win the competition for the sixth time, following a 5–4 penalty shoot-out victory after a 1–1 draw in extra-time.

With the under-19s, Leão participated in the 2017 UEFA European Under-19 Championship, helping finishing as runner-up, after losing in the final to England. At the 2019 FIFA U-20 World Cup in Poland he played all three games and scored the only goal in a 1–1 draw against South Africa, though his side did not advance from the group.

On 10 November 2017, aged only 18, Leão won his first cap for the Portugal under-21 side, playing 31 minutes in a 1–1 away draw against Romania for the 2019 UEFA European Championship qualifiers. He scored his first goal at that level on 10 September 2019, in a 2–0 victory in Belarus for the 2021 European Championship qualification campaign. In March 2021, Leão took part in the 2021 UEFA European Under-21 Championship, helping Portugal finish as runners-up, after losing in the final 1–0 to Germany.

=== Senior career ===
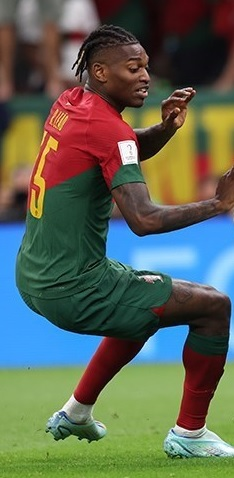
Leão with Portugal during a group stage match against Uruguay at the 2022 FIFA World Cup

On 5 October 2021, Leão was called up to the senior team for the first time, as a replacement for the injured Rafa Silva. Four days later, he made his international debut, replacing Cristiano Ronaldo at half-time and providing the assist for André Silva's goal in a 3–0 friendly defeat of Qatar.

In October 2022, he was named in Portugal's preliminary 55-man squad for the 2022 FIFA World Cup in Qatar, being included in the final 26-man squad for the tournament. On 25 November, Leão scored his first international goal, closing Portugal's 3–2 group stage win against Ghana. Leão followed with a second World Cup goal on 6 December when he sealed of Portugal's 6–1 thrashing of Switzerland in the round of 16. Portugal were eliminated in the quarter-finals after losing 1–0 to Morocco.

On 21 May 2024, he was selected in the 26-man squad for the UEFA Euro 2024. He started against the Czech Republic and Turkey, before missing the final group stage match Georgia, due to accumulation of yellow cards, for simulation in both matches. He made a further two appearances against Slovenia (3–0 victory in a penalty shootout) and France in the knockout stage (5–3 loss in another shootout).

In May 2025, Leão was selected for Portugal's 2025 UEFA Nations League Finals squad. He and his team would go on to win the tournament 5–3 in a penalty shootout over rivals Spain.

On 19 May 2026, Leão was selected in the 26-man squad for the 2026 FIFA World Cup. On 23 June, he scored the final goal in a 5–0 group stage victory over Uzbekistan. He assisted a stoppage-time goal to Gonçalo Ramos in a 2–1 victory over Croatia in the Round of 32, to help his country qualify to the Round of 16.

== Player profile ==
=== Style of play ===
Leão is regarded as a technical player, capable of playing on either flank. Standing 1.88 metres (6 ft 2 in) tall, Leão is a tall and lean player who has a burst and speed to match, making him a dynamic forward. Having developed as a centre-forward at youth level and during his season at Lille, he offers a dynamic presence in the forward line. He stretches and disrupts defences with his movements, with and without the ball. Leão is a proficient dribbler; he drives from deep and then overtakes players in one-on-one situations around the box with maneuvers and changes to his speed. He is also capable of creating chances and providing assists for teammates from the left due to his vision. Inside the penalty area, he uses dribbles and movement to get into good positions. Leão has also been played as a striker because of his composure and eye for goal.

Rafael Leão scoring a goal against Lecce in Serie A

During his managerial spell at Milan, Stefano Pioli deployed Leão as a supporting striker or a winger on either side of the pitch, rather than an out-and-out striker. Operating primarily on the left-hand side of Stefano Pioli's 4–2–3–1 system, Leão gives Milan a creative spark in wide areas where he particularly is involved in one-on-one situations, with his direct style of attacking, allowing him to aggressively accelerate past the defenders, where he can create big chances and engineer good shooting opportunities for himself, as opposed to dribbling past an opponent. Due to his pace, he is effective at exploiting space and attracting multiple defenders from the opposition towards him. Club teammate Fikayo Tomori describe him as "fast, he's strong, he can dribble, he can head the ball, he's tall. He's got everything".

=== Reception ===
Leão drew comparisons to French player Kylian Mbappé, being called the "Portuguese Mbappe". Tiago Fernandes, who worked with him at the Sporting youth academy, told French newspaper L'Équipe that in his opinion the player was better than Cristiano Ronaldo at the same stage. Jesus, who later coached him in the first team, said that he reminded him of former club striker Rui Jordão. Stefano Pioli and Italian manager Fabio Capello compared him to former Arsenal striker Thierry Henry. Portugal teammate Bruno Fernandes, stated Leão reminds him of Brazilian footballer Ronaldo "with his speed, technique and explosiveness in decisive moments, being qualities that have emerged every game to drag Milan towards great results.”

== Personal life ==
Leão is also a rapper and releases his music under the name WAY 45.

In addition to his native Portuguese, Leão is fluent in English and Italian as well as French following his stint at Lille. In 2024, Leão wrote an autobiography, edited by nss sport and published by Piemme, titled Smile. Leão is a practicing Catholic.

== Career statistics ==
=== Club ===
As of match played 7 November 2026

Appearances and goals by club, season and competition
| Club | Season | League | | | National cup (Note: Includes Coupe de France, Coppa Italia) | | Europe | | Other | | Total | |
| Club | Season | Division | Apps | Goals | Apps | Goals | Apps | Goals | Apps | Goals | Apps | Goals |
|---|---|---|---|---|---|---|---|---|---|---|---|---|
| Sporting CP B | 2016–17 | LigaPro | 1 | 1 | — | | — | | — | | 1 | 1 |
| Sporting CP B | 2017–18 | LigaPro | 11 | 6 | — | | — | | — | | 11 | 6 |
| Sporting CP B | Total | | 12 | 7 | — | | — | | — | | 12 | 7 |
| Sporting CP | 2017–18 | Primeira Liga | 3 | 1 | 0 | 0 | 1 (Note: Appearance(s) in UEFA Europa League) | 0 | — | | 4 | 1 |
| Lille | 2018–19 | Ligue 1 | 24 | 8 | 2 | 0 | — | | — | | 26 | 8 |
| AC Milan | 2019–20 | Serie A | 31 | 6 | 2 | 0 | — | | — | | 33 | 6 |
| AC Milan | 2020–21 | Serie A | 30 | 6 | 2 | 0 | 8 | 1 | — | | 40 | 7 |
| AC Milan | 2021–22 | Serie A | 34 | 11 | 4 | 2 | 4 (Note: Appearances in UEFA Champions League) | 1 | — | | 42 | 14 |
| AC Milan | 2022–23 | Serie A | 35 | 15 | 1 | 0 | 11 | 1 | 1 (Note: Appearance in Supercoppa Italiana) | 0 | 48 | 16 |
| AC Milan | 2023–24 | Serie A | 34 | 9 | 2 | 2 | 11 (Note: Five appearances and one goal in UEFA Champions League, six appearances and three goals in UEFA Europa League) | 4 | — | | 47 | 15 |
| AC Milan | 2024–25 | Serie A | 34 | 8 | 5 | 1 | 10 | 3 | 1 | 0 | 50 | 12 |
| AC Milan | 2025–26 | Serie A | 29 | 9 | 2 | 1 | — | | 0 | 0 | 31 | 10 |
| AC Milan | Total | | 227 | 64 | 18 | 6 | 44 | 10 | 2 | 0 | 291 | 80 |
| Galatasaray | 2026–27 | Süper Lig | 8 | 2 | 0 | 0 | 3 | 0 | 0 | 0 | 11 | 2 |
| Career total | | | 274 | 82 | 20 | 6 | 48 | 10 | 2 | 0 | 344 | 98 |

=== International ===
As of match played 1 October 2026

Appearances and goals by national team and year
| National team | Year | Apps | Goals |
|---|---|---|---|
| Portugal | 2021 | 3 | 0 |
| Portugal | 2022 | 13 | 2 |
| Portugal | 2023 | 7 | 1 |
| Portugal | 2024 | 14 | 2 |
| Portugal | 2025 | 6 | 0 |
| Portugal | 2026 | 8 | 1 |
| Total | | 51 | 6 |

As of match played 23 June 2026. Scores and results list Portugal's goal tally first, score column indicates score after each Leão goal.

List of international goals scored by Rafael Leão
| No. | Date | Venue | Cap | Opponent | Score | Result | Competition |
|---|---|---|---|---|---|---|---|
| 1 | 24 November 2022 | Stadium 974, Doha, Qatar | 12 | Ghana | 3–1 | 3–2 | 2022 FIFA World Cup |
| 2 | 6 December 2022 | Lusail Iconic Stadium, Lusail, Qatar | 15 | Switzerland | 6–1 | 6–1 | 2022 FIFA World Cup |
| 3 | 26 March 2023 | Stade de Luxembourg, Luxembourg City, Luxembourg | 18 | Luxembourg | 6–0 | 6–0 | UEFA Euro 2024 qualifying |
| 4 | 21 March 2024 | Estádio D. Afonso Henriques, Guimarães, Portugal | 24 | Sweden | 1–0 | 5–2 | Friendly |
| 5 | 15 November 2024 | Estádio do Dragão, Porto, Portugal | 36 | Poland | 1–0 | 5–1 | 2024–25 UEFA Nations League A |
| 6 | 23 June 2026 | NRG Stadium, Houston, United States | 46 | Uzbekistan | 5–0 | 5–0 | 2026 FIFA World Cup |

== Honours ==
AC Milan

- Serie A: 2021–22
- Supercoppa Italiana: 2024–25

Portugal U17

- UEFA European Under-17 Championship: 2016

Portugal U19

- UEFA European Under-19 Championship runner-up: 2017

Portugal U21

- UEFA European Under-21 Championship runner-up: 2021

Portugal

- UEFA Nations League: 2024–25

Individual

- Serie A Most Valuable Player: 2021–22
- Serie A Player of the Month: October 2022, April 2023, September 2023
- Serie A Goal of the Month: September 2022
- Serie A Team of the Year: 2021–22, 2022–23, 2023–24
- Serie A Footballer of the Year: 2022
- Serie A Top Assist provider: 2023–24

Records

- Fastest goal ever scored in the Italian Serie A: 6.2 seconds after the start of Sassuolo–AC Milan, in the 2020–21 season.
