= 2026–27 Sevilla FC season =

Sevilla FC
2026–27 season
- President: José María del Nido Carrasco
- Manager: Luis García Plaza
- Stadium: Ramón Sánchez-Pizjuán
- La Liga: 6th
- Copa del Rey: Second round
- Top goalscorer: League: Isaac Romero (3 goals); All: Isaac Romero (3 goals)
- Highest home attendance: 42,983 (v. Real Betis, La Liga, 21 November 2026)
- Lowest home attendance: 36,777 (v. Rayo Vallecano, La Liga, 15 August 2026)
- Average home league attendance: 39,501
- Biggest win: 3–0 v. Sporting Hortaleza (A); Copa del Rey, 29 October 2026
- Biggest defeat: 1–4 v. Real Madrid (A); La Liga, 18 October 2026
Home colours	Away colours	Third colours
- All statistics correct as of 21 November 2026.

The 2026–27 season is the 120th season in the history of Sevilla Fútbol Club, and the club's 26th consecutive season in La Liga. In addition to the domestic league, the club will participate in the Copa del Rey.

== Players ==
=== First team squad ===
As of 13 October 2026

Note: Flags indicate national team as defined under FIFA eligibility rules; some limited exceptions apply. Players may hold more than one non-FIFA nationality.

No.	Pos.	Nation	Player
1	GK	GRE	Odysseas Vlachodimos (on loan from Newcastle)
2	DF	ESP	Juan Iglesias
3	DF	ESP	Julio Díaz
4	DF	ESP	Kike Salas (vice-captain)
5	DF	ESP	Andrés Castrín
6	MF	FRA	Lucien Agoumé (3rd captain)
7	FW	ESP	Alfon González
8	MF	GEO	Giorgi Kochorashvili
9	FW	SCO	Robbie Ure
10	MF	ESP	Peque Fernández
11	FW	SUI	Rubén Vargas
12	DF	SEN	Arouna Sangante
13	GK	ESP	Fran González

No.	Pos.	Nation	Player
14	MF	ESP	Manu Bueno
15	DF	POR	Fábio Cardoso
16	FW	ESP	Isaac Romero
17	DF	CHI	Gabriel Suazo (captain)
18	MF	ESP	Jon Guridi
19	FW	BEL	Lucas Stassin (on loan from Saint-Étienne)
20	FW	POR	Félix Correia (on loan from Lille)
21	FW	NGR	Chidera Ejuke
22	DF	ESP	José Ángel Carmona
23	DF	BRA	Marcão (4th captain)
24	MF	FRA	Youssouf Fofana (on loan from Milan)
30	FW	ESP	Miguel Sierra
33	GK	ESP	Rafa Romero

=== Reserve ===
Note: Flags indicate national team as defined under FIFA eligibility rules; some limited exceptions apply. Players may hold more than one non-FIFA nationality.

No.	Pos.	Nation	Player
26	FW	ESP	Manuel Ángel
27	MF	ESP	Nico Guillén
34	DF	ESP	Iker Muñoz

No.	Pos.	Nation	Player
37	FW	SEN	Ibra Sow
39	MF	ESP	Edu Altozano

== Transfers ==
=== In ===
Pos.	Player	Transferred from	Fee	Date	Source
MF	(Spain) Jon Guridi	Alavés	Free transfer	10 June 2026	
DF	(Spain) Juan Iglesias	Getafe	Free transfer	11 June 2026	
DF	(Senegal) Arouna Sangante	(France) Le Havre	Free transfer	16 June 2026	
DF	(Spain) Adrià Pedrosa	Elche	Loan return	30 June 2026	
FW	(Spain) Rafa Mir	Elche	Loan return	30 June 2026	
FW	(Spain) Alfon González	Villarreal	Loan return	30 June 2026	
GK	(Greece) Odysseas Vlachodimos	(England) Newcastle United	Loan	1 July 2026	
DF	(Spain) Julio Díaz	Atlético Madrid	€1,000,000	28 July 2026	
GK	(Spain) Fran González	Real Madrid	€1,000,000	2 August 2026	
FW	(Scotland) Robbie Ure	(Sweden) Sirius	€5,500,000	11 August 2026	
MF	(Georgia (country)) Giorgi Kochorashvili	(Portugal) Sporting CP	€4,500,000	21 August 2026	
MF	(France) Youssouf Fofana	(Italy) AC Milan	Loan transfer	1 September 2026	
FW	(Belgium) Lucas Stassin	(France) Saint-Étienne	€2,500,000 (Loan)	1 September 2026	
FW	(Portugal) Félix Correia	(France) Lille	Loan transfer	1 September 2026	

=== Out ===
Pos.	Player	Transferred to	Fee	Date	Source
DF	(Spain) César Azpilicueta	Retired		23 May 2026	
GK	(Norway) Ørjan Nyland	Free agent	Contract expire	30 June 2026	
MF	(Serbia) Nemanja Gudelj	Free agent	Contract expire	30 June 2026	
MF	(Belgium) Adnan Januzaj	Free agent	Contract expire	30 June 2026	
FW	(Chile) Alexis Sánchez	Free agent	Contract expire	30 June 2026	
MF	(France) Batista Mendy	(Turkey) Trabzonspor	Loan return	30 June 2026	
FW	(France) Neal Maupay	(France) Marseille	Loan return	30 June 2026	
DF	(France) Tanguy Nianzou	(France) Lille	Free transfer	18 July 2026	
FW	(Nigeria) Akor Adams	(Italy) Venezia	€17,000,000	22 July 2026	
FW	(Spain) Rafa Mir	(Greece) Aris	Loan transfer	4 August 2026	
DF	(Spain) Juanlu Sánchez	(England) Bournemouth	€11,200,000	6 August 2026	
MF	(Switzerland) Djibril Sow	(Italy) Genoa	€4,000,000	6 August 2026	
GK	(Spain) Alberto Flores	Granada	Free transfer	10 August 2026	
MF	(Spain) Joan Jordán	(Portugal) Estrela da Amadora	Free transfer	10 August 2026	
DF	(Argentina) Federico Gattoni	(Italy) Ascoli	Free transfer	12 August 2026	
DF	(Spain) Adrià Pedrosa	Rayo Vallecano	Loan transfer	27 August 2026	
DF	(Spain) Oso	(France) Strasbourg	€10,000,000	30 August 2026	

== Non-competitive ==
=== Pre-season ===
Win Draw Loss Fixtures

11 July 2026 Friendly	Sevilla (Spain)	1–0	(Spain) Juventud Torremolinos	Seville, Spain
20:00 CEST (UTC+2)	Sierra 52' (pen.)	Report		Stadium: Estadio Jesús Navas; Attendance: 0
Note: The match was played behind closed doors

19 July 2026 Friendly	Cracovia (Poland)	1–0	(Spain) Sevilla	Kraków, Poland
15:00 CEST (UTC+2)	Hasić 30'	Report		Stadium: Józef Piłsudski Cracovia Stadium

23 July 2026 Friendly	Córdoba (Spain)	0–0 (4–5 p)	(Spain) Sevilla	Córdoba, Spain
20:00 CEST (UTC+2)	Carracedo (penalty missed)	Report		Stadium: Bahrain Victorious Nuevo Arcángel de Córdoba
	Penalties
	Albarrán (penalty scored); Vilarrasa (penalty scored); Sánchez (penalty scored); Cáceres (penalty scored); Zidane (penalty missed)		Peque (penalty scored); Oso (penalty scored); Sierra (penalty scored); Guridi (penalty scored); Romero (penalty scored)

26 July 2026 Friendly	Sevilla (Spain)	2–1	(Spain) Ceuta	Seville, Spain
20:00 CEST (UTC+2)	Peque 66'; Sierra 78'	Report	Anuar 69'	Stadium: Estadio Jesús Navas; Attendance: 0
Note: The match was played behind closed doors

31 July 2026 Friendly	NEC (Netherlands)	1–2	(Spain) Sevilla	Nijmegen, Netherlands
18:00 CEST (UTC+2)	Ouaissa 27'	Report	Romero 37'; Sow 83'	Stadium: Goffertstadion

2 August 2026 Friendly	Utrecht (Netherlands)	0–1	(Spain) Sevilla	Utrecht, Netherlands
13:30 CEST (UTC+2)		Report	Peque 28'	Stadium: Stadion Galgenwaard

8 August 2026 Friendly	Bayer Leverkusen (Germany)	2–1	(Spain) Sevilla	Leverkusen, Germany
14:30 CEST (UTC+2)	Schick 66', 78'	Report	Sierra 16'	Stadium: BayArena

=== Mid-season ===
2 October 2026 Antonio Puerta Trophy	Sevilla (Spain)	1–3	(England) Aston Villa	Seville, Spain
20:30 CEST (UTC+2)	Romero 53'	Report	Barkley 71'; Garnacho 79'; Jenner 83'	Stadium: Ramón Sánchez-Pizjuán; Referee: Alejandro Quintero González

== Competitions ==
=== Overall record ===
Competition	First match	Last match	Starting round	Final position	Record							
Competition	First match	Last match	Starting round	Final position	Pld	W	D	L	GF	GA	GD	Win %
La Liga	15 August 2026	30 May 2027	Matchday 1	TBD	13	5	4	4	18	20	−2	38.46
Copa del Rey	29 October 2026	TBD	First round	TBD	1	1	0	0	3	0	+3	100.00
Total					14	6	4	4	21	20	+1	42.86

Source: Soccerway

=== La Liga ===
==== League table ====
Pos	Team	Pld	W	D	L	GF	GA	GD	Pts	Qualification or relegation
4	Real Betis	13	8	3	2	21	16	+5	27	Qualification for the UEFA Champions League league phase
5	Real Sociedad	12	7	1	4	21	20	+1	22	Qualification for the UEFA Europa League league phase
6	Sevilla	13	5	4	4	18	20	−2	19	Qualification for the UEFA Conference League play-off round
7	Athletic Bilbao	12	4	4	4	15	12	+3	16	
8	Alavés	13	4	4	5	18	18	0	16	

Updated to match(es) played on 21 November 2026. Source: LaLiga EA Sports
Rules for classification: 1) Points; 2) Head-to-head points; 3) Head-to-head goal difference; 4) Goal difference; 5) Goals scored; 6) Fair-play points (if three or more teams tied); 7) Play-off at neutral site.
(Note: Head-to-head record is used only after all the matches between the teams in question have been played)

==== Results summary ====
Overall								Home						Away					
Pld	W	D	L	GF	GA	GD	Pts	W	D	L	GF	GA	GD	W	D	L	GF	GA	GD
13	5	4	4	18	20	−2	19	3	2	2	8	8	0	2	2	2	10	12	−2

Last updated: 21 November 2026.
Source: Soccerway

==== Results by round ====
Round	1	2	3	4	5	6	7	8	9	10	11	12	13	14	15	16	17	18	19	20	21	22	23	24	25	26	27	28	29	30	31	32	33	34	35	36	37	38
Ground	H	A	H	A	H	A	H	A	A	H	A	H	H	A	H	A	H	A	H	A	A	H	A	H	H	A	H	A	H	A	H	A	H	A	A	H	H	A
Result	W	W	L	D	W	W	L	D	L	W	L	D	D																									
Position	7	3	6	7	6	5	5	5	6	6	6	6																										
Points	3	6	6	7	10	13	13	14	14	17	17	18	19																									

Updated to match(es) played on 21 November 2026. Source: La Liga
A = Away; H = Home; W = Win; D = Draw; L = Loss; P = Postponed

==== Matches ====
The league fixtures were released on 30 June 2026.

Win Draw Loss Fixtures

15 August 2026 1	Sevilla	2–1	Rayo Vallecano	Seville
21:30 CEST (UTC+2)	Romero (yellow card) 45+3'; Guridi 52' (pen.), (yellow card) 60'; Suazo (yellow card) 81'; Salas (red card) 88'; Peque 90+7' (pen.); Agoumé (yellow card) 90+12'	Report	García 4', (yellow card) 67'; López (yellow card) 75'; Pérez (yellow card) 76'; Alemão (yellow card) 90+12'	Stadium: Ramón Sánchez-Pizjuán; Attendance: 36,777; Referee: Ricardo de Burgos Bengoetxea

22 August 2026 2	Athletic Bilbao	1–3	Sevilla	Bilbao
17:00 CEST (UTC+2)	Berchiche (red card) 11'; Guruzeta (yellow card) 25'; Paredes 70'; Ruiz de Galarreta (yellow card) 86'	Report	Oso 15'; Peque (yellow card) 22'; Sierra (yellow card) 25'; Guridi (yellow card) 39'; Ejuke 50'; Romero 57', (yellow card) 90'; Guillén (yellow card) 90+3'	Stadium: San Mamés; Attendance: 49,416; Referee: César Soto Grado

29 August 2026 3	Sevilla	1–3	Atlético Madrid	Seville
21:30 CEST (UTC+2)	Sierra 66'; Romero (yellow card) 89'; Suazo (yellow card) 90+1'	Report	Baena 4', 33'; Lookman 26'; Llorente (yellow card) 45+4'; Pubill (yellow card) 90+5'	Stadium: Ramón Sánchez-Pizjuán; Attendance: 38,340; Referee: Javier Alberola Rojas

6 September 2026 4	Espanyol	1–1	Sevilla	Cornellà de Llobregat
21:00 CEST (UTC+2)	Calatrava (yellow card) 14'; Moscardo (yellow card) 46'; Fernández 90+8'	Report	Kochorashvili (yellow card) 2'; Ure (yellow card) 27'; Sierra (yellow card) 40'; Sangante (red card) 56'; Stassin 85'	Stadium: RCDE Stadium; Attendance: 30,475; Referee: Miguel Sesma Espinosa

11 September 2026 5	Sevilla	1–0	Valencia	Seville
21:00 CEST (UTC+2)	Ejuke (yellow card) 67'; Iglesias 81'	Report	Satō (yellow card) 27'; Maffeo (yellow card) 88'	Stadium: Ramón Sánchez-Pizjuán; Attendance: 39,939; Referee: Mateo Busquets Ferrer

16 September 2026 6	Deportivo A Coruña	0–1	Sevilla	A Coruña
19:00 CEST (UTC+2)	Angeliño (red card) 59'; Amatucci (yellow card) 77'	Report	Sierra 52'; Salas (yellow card) 65'; Guridi (yellow card) 79'; Romero (yellow card) 90+4'; Iglesias (yellow card) 90+6'	Stadium: Abanca-Riazor; Attendance: 28,506; Referee: Alejandro Hernández Hernández

19 September 2026 7	Sevilla	1–3	Barcelona	Seville
21:00 CEST (UTC+2)	Fofana 19'; Agoumé (yellow card) 80'	Report	Raphinha 22', 52', 69'	Stadium: Ramón Sánchez-Pizjuán; Attendance: 41,145; Referee: Juan Martínez Munuera

12 October 2026 8	Levante	3–3	Sevilla	Valencia
21:00 CEST (UTC+2)	Iv. Romero 57'; Requena (yellow card) 76'; Dela (yellow card) 39', (goal) 90+2'; Ndukwe 90+10'	Report	Ure 13'; Correia (yellow card) 48', (goal) 54'; Castrín (yellow card) 63'; Alfon (yellow card) 84'; Is. Romero 90+5', (yellow card) 90+2' (yellow-red card) 90+6'; Iglesias (yellow card) 90+6'	Stadium: Ciutat de València; Attendance: 19,840; Referee: Adrián Cordero Vega

18 October 2026 9	Real Madrid	4–1	Sevilla	Madrid
21:00 CEST (UTC+2)	Huijsen (yellow card) 23'; Güler 30'; Mbappé 37', 63' (pen.); Cucurella (yellow card) 73'; Diomande 82'	Report	Correia (yellow card) 23'; Iglesias (yellow card) 69'; Bueno 80'	Stadium: Bernabéu; Attendance: 73,907; Referee: Mateo Busquets Ferrer

26 October 2026 10	Sevilla	2–0	Osasuna	Seville
21:00 CET (UTC+1)	Romero 24', (yellow card) 55'; Correia 82'	Report	Catena (yellow card) 29'; Rosier (yellow card) 68'	Stadium: Ramón Sánchez-Pizjuán; Attendance: 38,523; Referee: Miguel Ángel Ortiz Arias

1 November 2026 11	Getafe	3–1	Sevilla	Getafe
14:00 CET (UTC+1)	Davinchi (yellow card) 59'; Ünal 68'; Satriano 73'; Gudelj (yellow card) 84'; Mangala 90+4'	Report	Salas 19'; Suazo (yellow card) 27'; Agoumé (yellow card) 77'; Castrín (yellow card) 77'; Sangante (yellow card) 77'; Bueno (red card) 90+1'	Stadium: Coliseum; Attendance: 7,745; Referee: Víctor García Verdura

6 November 2026 12	Sevilla	0–0	Alavés	Seville
21:00 CET (UTC+1)	Sangante (yellow card) 47'	Report	Ibáñez (yellow card) 30'; Martínez (yellow card) 63'; Valentini (yellow card) 64'	Stadium: Ramón Sánchez-Pizjuán; Attendance: 38,803; Referee: Luis Bestard Servera

21 November 2026 13	Sevilla	1–1	Real Betis	Seville
18:30 CET (UTC+1)	Agoumé (yellow card) 15'; Salas (yellow card) 18', (goal) 90+1'; Castrín (yellow card) 61'; Ure (yellow card) 84'; Iglesias (yellow card) 86'	Report	Firpo (yellow card) 11'; Hernández (yellow card) 11'; Antony 50'; Bellerín (yellow card) 79'; Fornals (yellow card) 86'	Stadium: Ramón Sánchez-Pizjuán; Attendance: 42,983; Referee: José María Sánchez Martínez

29 November 2026 14	Real Sociedad	v	Sevilla	San Sebastián
21:00 CET (UTC+1)		Report		Stadium: Anoeta

7 December 2026 15	Sevilla	v	Málaga	Seville
21:00 CET (UTC+1)		Report		Stadium: Ramón Sánchez-Pizjuán

13 December 2026 16	Elche	v	Sevilla	Elche
TBC CET (UTC+1)		Report		Stadium: Martínez Valero

20 December 2026 17	Sevilla	v	Racing Santander	Seville
TBC CET (UTC+1)		Report		Stadium: Ramón Sánchez-Pizjuán

3 January 2027 18	Villarreal	v	Sevilla	Villarreal
TBC CET (UTC+1)		Report		Stadium: La Cerámica

10 January 2027 19	Sevilla	v	Celta Vigo	Seville
TBC CET (UTC+1)		Report		Stadium: Ramón Sánchez-Pizjuán

17 January 2027 20	Rayo Vallecano	v	Sevilla	Madrid
TBC CET (UTC+1)		Report		Stadium: Vallecas

24 January 2027 21	Valencia	v	Sevilla	Valencia
TBC CET (UTC+1)		Report		Stadium: Mestalla

31 January 2027 22	Sevilla	v	Athletic Bilbao	Seville
TBC CET (UTC+1)		Report		Stadium: Ramón Sánchez-Pizjuán

7 February 2027 23	Real Betis	v	Sevilla	Seville
TBC CET (UTC+1)		Report		Stadium: La Cartuja

14 February 2027 24	Sevilla	v	Espanyol	Seville
TBC CET (UTC+1)		Report		Stadium: Ramón Sánchez-Pizjuán

21 February 2027 25	Sevilla	v	Real Madrid	Seville
TBC CET (UTC+1)		Report		Stadium: Ramón Sánchez-Pizjuán

28 February 2027 26	Osasuna	v	Sevilla	Pamplona
TBC CET (UTC+1)		Report		Stadium: El Sadar

7 March 2027 27	Sevilla	v	Real Sociedad	Seville
TBC CET (UTC+1)		Report		Stadium: Ramón Sánchez-Pizjuán

14 March 2027 28	Alavés	v	Sevilla	Vitoria-Gasteiz
TBC CET (UTC+1)		Report		Stadium: Mendizorrotza

21 March 2027 29	Sevilla	v	Elche	Seville
TBC CET (UTC+1)		Report		Stadium: Ramón Sánchez-Pizjuán

4 April 2027 30	Barcelona	v	Sevilla	Barcelona
TBC CEST (UTC+2)		Report		Stadium: Camp Nou

11 April 2027 31	Sevilla	v	Deportivo A Coruña	Seville
TBC CEST (UTC+2)		Report		Stadium: Ramón Sánchez-Pizjuán

18 April 2027 32	Atlético Madrid	v	Sevilla	Madrid
TBC CEST (UTC+2)		Report		Stadium: Riyadh Air Metropolitano

21 April 2027 33	Sevilla	v	Levante	Seville
TBC CEST (UTC+2)		Report		Stadium: Ramón Sánchez-Pizjuán

2 May 2027 34	Celta Vigo	v	Sevilla	Vigo
TBC CEST (UTC+2)		Report		Stadium: Abanca-Balaídos

9 May 2027 35	Racing Santander	v	Sevilla	Santander
TBC CEST (UTC+2)		Report		Stadium: El Sardinero

16 May 2027 36	Sevilla	v	Villarreal	Seville
TBC CEST (UTC+2)		Report		Stadium: Ramón Sánchez-Pizjuán

23 May 2027 37	Sevilla	v	Getafe	Seville
TBC CEST (UTC+2)		Report		Stadium: Ramón Sánchez-Pizjuán

30 May 2027 38	Málaga	v	Sevilla	Málaga
TBC CEST (UTC+2)		Report		Stadium: La Rosaleda

=== Copa del Rey ===
As a La Liga side not competing in the Supercopa de España, Sevilla entered the Copa del Rey in the first round.

Win Draw Loss Fixtures

29 October 2026 First round	Sporting Hortaleza	0–3	Sevilla	Alcalá de Henares
21:00 CET (UTC+1)	Muñoz (yellow card) 18'; Fati (yellow card) 38'; Bayarri (yellow card) 55'	Report	Ure 24'; Guillén (yellow card) 35'; Peque 40' (pen.); Vargas 56'	Stadium: Estadio Municipal del Val; Attendance: 6,720; Referee: Luis Bestard Servera

== Statistics ==
=== Appearances ===
Players with no appearances are not included on the list, italics indicate a loaned in player.

No.	Pos	Nat	Player	Total		La Liga		Copa del Rey	
No.	Pos	Nat	Player	Apps	Goals	Apps	Goals	Apps	Goals
1	GK	(Greece) GRE	Odysseas Vlachodimos	13	0	13	0	0	0
2	DF	(Spain) ESP	Juan Iglesias	13	1	13	1	0	0
3	DF	(Spain) ESP	Julio Díaz	7	0	1+5	0	1	0
4	DF	(Spain) ESP	Kike Salas	11	2	11	2	0	0
5	DF	(Spain) ESP	Andrés Castrín	12	0	10+2	0	0	0
6	MF	(France) FRA	Lucien Agoumé	13	0	13	0	0	0
7	FW	(Spain) ESP	Alfon González	6	0	0+5	0	1	0
8	MF	(Georgia (country)) GEO	Giorgi Kochorashvili	9	0	3+5	0	1	0
9	FW	(Scotland) SCO	Robbie Ure	14	2	6+7	1	1	1
10	MF	(Spain) ESP	Peque Fernández	6	2	3+2	1	1	1
11	FW	(Switzerland) SUI	Rubén Vargas	7	1	3+3	0	1	1
12	DF	(Senegal) SEN	Arouna Sangante	6	0	5	0	1	0
13	GK	(Spain) ESP	Fran González	1	0	0	0	1	0
14 (Note: Manu Bueno wore number 28 until 2 September 2026.)	MF	(Spain) ESP	Manu Bueno	6	1	0+5	1	0+1	0
15	DF	(Portugal) POR	Fábio Cardoso	1	0	0	0	0+1	0
16	FW	(Spain) ESP	Isaac Romero	11	3	5+6	3	0	0
17	DF	(Chile) CHI	Gabriel Suazo	13	0	13	0	0	0
18	MF	(Spain) ESP	Jon Guridi	10	1	6+3	1	0+1	0
19	FW	(Belgium) BEL	Lucas Stassin	8	1	6+2	1	0	0
20	FW	(Portugal) POR	Félix Correia	9	2	9	2	0	0
21	FW	(Nigeria) NGR	Chidera Ejuke	11	1	3+8	1	0	0
22	DF	(Spain) ESP	José Ángel Carmona	6	0	0+5	0	1	0
24	MF	(France) FRA	Youssouf Fofana	10	1	9+1	1	0	0
26	FW	(Spain) ESP	Manuel Ángel	1	0	0	0	0+1	0
27	MF	(Spain) ESP	Nico Guillén	3	0	1+1	0	1	0
30	FW	(Spain) ESP	Miguel Sierra	8	2	8	2	0	0
34	DF	(Spain) ESP	Iker Muñoz	1	0	0	0	1	0
37	FW	(Senegal) SEN	Ibra Sow	1	0	0	0	0+1	0
Player(s) who featured but departed the club on loan or permanently during the season:
19	DF	(Spain) ESP	Oso	2	1	2	1	0	0

=== Goals ===
Rank	Pos.	No.	Player	La Liga	Copa del Rey	Total
1	FW	16	(Spain) Isaac Romero	3	0	3
2	DF	4	(Spain) Kike Salas	2	0	2
2	FW	9	(Scotland) Robbie Ure	1	1	2
2	MF	10	(Spain) Peque Fernández	1	1	2
2	FW	20	(Portugal) Félix Correia	2	0	2
2	FW	30	(Spain) Miguel Sierra	2	0	2
3	DF	2	(Spain) Juan Iglesias	1	0	1
3	FW	11	(Switzerland) Rubén Vargas	0	1	1
3	MF	14	(Spain) Manu Bueno	1	0	1
3	MF	18	(Spain) Jon Guridi	1	0	1
3	FW	19	(Belgium) Lucas Stassin	1	0	1
3	DF	19	(Spain) Oso	1	0	1
3	FW	21	(Nigeria) Chidera Ejuke	1	0	1
3	MF	24	(France) Youssouf Fofana	1	0	1
Total				18	3	21

=== Disciplinary record ===
No.	Pos.	Player	La Liga			Copa del Rey			Total		
No.	Pos.	Player	Yellow card	(yellow card) (yellow-red card)	Red card	Yellow card	(yellow card) (yellow-red card)	Red card	Yellow card	(yellow card) (yellow-red card)	Red card
2	DF	(Spain) Juan Iglesias	4	0	0	0	0	0	4	0	0
4	DF	(Spain) Kike Salas	2	0	1	0	0	0	2	0	1
5	DF	(Spain) Andrés Castrín	3	0	0	0	0	0	3	0	0
6	MF	(France) Lucien Agoumé	4	0	0	0	0	0	4	0	0
7	FW	(Spain) Alfon González	1	0	0	0	0	0	1	0	0
8	MF	(Georgia (country)) Giorgi Kochorashvili	1	0	0	0	0	0	1	0	0
9	FW	(Scotland) Robbie Ure	2	0	0	0	0	0	2	0	0
10	MF	(Spain) Peque Fernández	1	0	0	0	0	0	1	0	0
12	DF	(Senegal) Arouna Sangante	2	0	1	0	0	0	2	0	1
14	MF	(Spain) Manu Bueno	0	0	1	0	0	0	0	0	1
16	FW	(Spain) Isaac Romero	5	1	0	0	0	0	5	1	0
17	DF	(Chile) Gabriel Suazo	3	0	0	0	0	0	3	0	0
18	MF	(Spain) Jon Guridi	3	0	0	0	0	0	3	0	0
20	FW	(Portugal) Félix Correia	2	0	0	0	0	0	2	0	0
21	FW	(Nigeria) Chidera Ejuke	1	0	0	0	0	0	1	0	0
27	MF	(Spain) Nico Guillén	1	0	0	1	0	0	2	0	0
30	FW	(Spain) Miguel Sierra	2	0	0	0	0	0	2	0	0
Total			37	1	3	1	0	0	38	1	3
