= Diego Martínez (Spanish footballer, born 1980) =

Spanish football manager

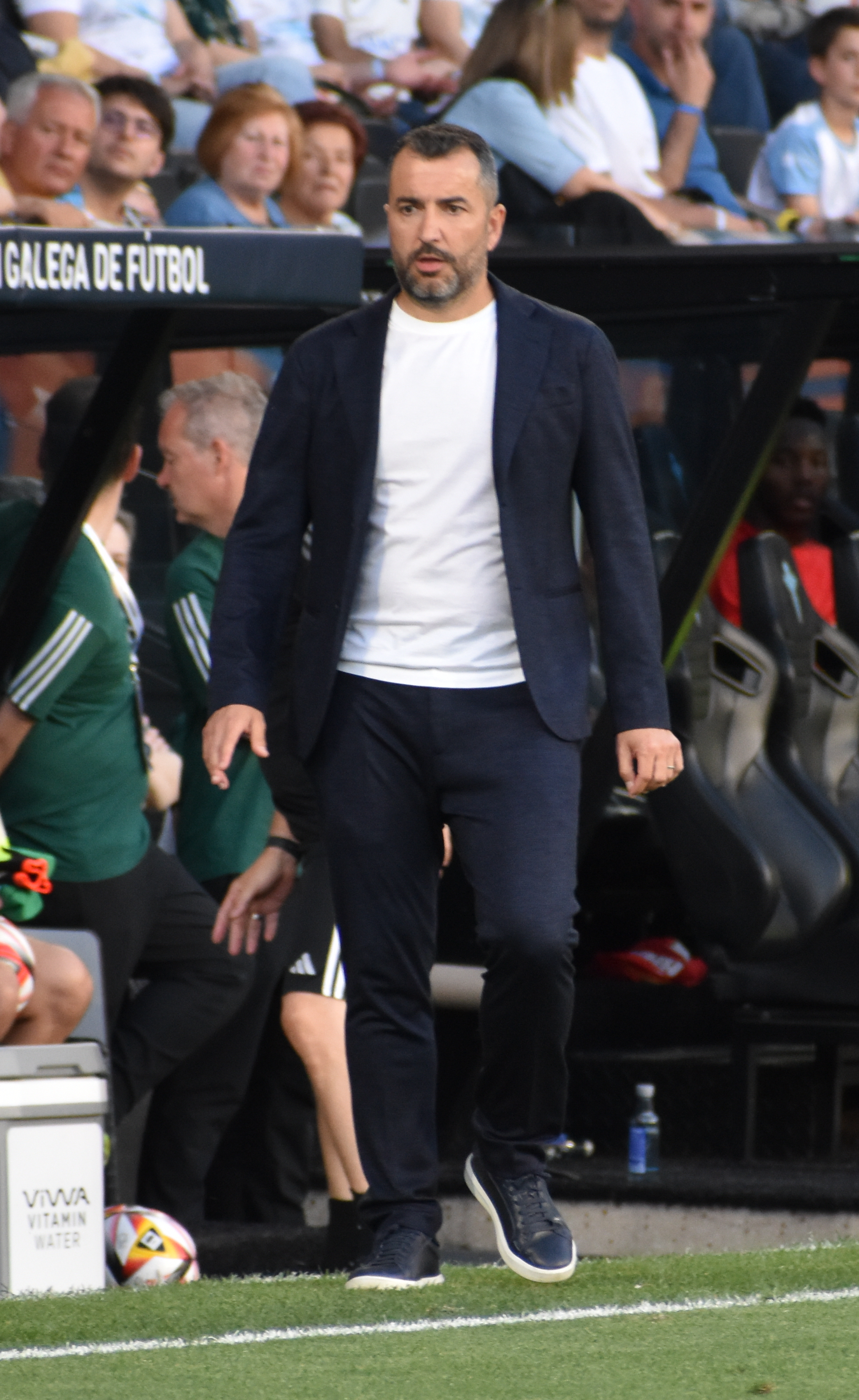
- Martínez in 2023.

Personal information
- Full name: Diego Martínez Penas
- Date of birth: 16 December 1980 (age 45)
- Place of birth: Vigo, Spain
- Position: Full back

Team information
- Current team: Galicia (manager)

Youth career
- 1990–1999: Celta
- 1999–2000: Cádiz

Senior career*
Years	Team	Apps	(Gls)
- Imperio Albolote

Managerial career
- Imperio Albolote (youth)
- 2004–2005: Arenas Armilla (youth)
- 2005–2006: Arenas Armilla (assistant)
- 2006–2007: Arenas Armilla
- 2007–2009: Motril
- 2010–2011: Sevilla C
- 2011–2012: Sevilla (youth)
- 2012–2014: Sevilla (assistant)
- 2014–2017: Sevilla B
- 2017–2018: Osasuna
- 2018–2021: Granada
- 2022–2023: Espanyol
- 2023: Olympiacos
- 2024–2025: Las Palmas
- 2025–: Galicia
- * Club domestic league appearances and goals

Diego Martínez Penas (born 16 December 1980) is a Spanish professional football manager and former footballer. He is the current manager of the Galicia national football team.

After starting his career in the lower divisions, he held several jobs at Sevilla, including as assistant and reserve team manager. He later managed Osasuna, Granada and Espanyol, achieving promotion to La Liga with the second club.

== Playing career ==
Born in Vigo, Pontevedra, Galicia, Martínez was a full back capable of playing on either side. He spent his youth career at Celta and Cádiz, representing the former for nine years.

== Managerial career ==
=== Early career ===
Martínez retired from professional football at the age of 20, and started his coaching career with Imperio de Albolote's youth categories, while also playing for their first team. During this time he also studied for a degree. In 2004, he moved to Arenas, being initially in charge of the youth setup.

An assistant manager in the 2005–06 campaign, Martínez was appointed manager of the first team in July 2006, in Tercera División. The following year he was named Motril manager, and remained in charge for two years.

=== Sevilla ===
In October 2009 Martínez moved to Sevilla, immediately joining the backroom staff. He was in charge of the club's C-team the following season, and subsequently managed the Juvenil squad.

On 22 May 2012, Martínez was named assistant at the first team, replacing Javi Navarro. On 13 June 2014, he was appointed at the helm of the reserves in Segunda División B, and managed to achieve promotion to Segunda División in 2016.

After avoiding relegation with the reserve side, Martínez opted not to renew his contract, and was appointed in charge of Osasuna on 14 June 2017. The following 7 June, he left the club after failing to qualify for the play-offs.

=== Granada ===
On 14 June 2018, Martínez was named Granada manager, and achieved promotion to La Liga at the end of the season. The youngest manager of the 2019–20 campaign, his side enjoyed their best-ever league start after achieving 20 points in ten matches, bringing the Nazaríes to the top of the tournament for two weeks. As a result, he was rewarded with a one-year contract extension through 2021 on 14 November 2019.

Martínez was awarded with the Miguel Muñoz Trophy (shared with José Bordalás) by Marca on 16 December 2019, for his efforts in the previous campaign. With a seventh-place finish in his debut top-flight campaign, he qualified the team for the first time to the UEFA Europa League. In that campaign, they reached the quarter-finals before being eliminated by Manchester United.

On 27 May 2021, Martínez chose to allow his contract to expire. He then spent a season in England, watching football matches and learning from coaches including Pep Guardiola, Rafael Benítez, Frank Lampard and Xisco Muñoz.

=== Espanyol ===
On 31 May 2022, Martínez was named manager of Espanyol also in the top tier, on a two-year contract. The following 3 April, after four consecutive defeats, he left the club.

=== Olympiacos ===
On 20 June 2023, Martínez was appointed as head coach of Super League Greece club Olympiacos. On 5 December, with the club sitting fourth in the league table and eliminated from the UEFA Europa League, he was sacked.

=== Las Palmas ===
On 8 October 2024, Martínez returned to Spain and its top tier, after being appointed manager of UD Las Palmas. On 5 June of the following year, after suffering relegation, he left.

== Managerial statistics ==
As of match played 24 May 2025

Managerial record by team and tenure
Team	Nat	From	To	Record								Ref
Team	Nat	From	To	G	W	D	L	GF	GA	GD	Win %	Ref
Arenas Armilla	(Spain)	1 July 2006	30 June 2007	38	20	6	12	56	26	+30	52.63	
Motril	(Spain)	1 July 2007	30 June 2009	80	39	20	21	134	103	+31	48.75	
Sevilla C	(Spain)	1 July 2010	30 June 2011	38	12	15	11	42	40	+2	31.58	
Sevilla B	(Spain)	13 June 2014	14 June 2017	124	43	47	34	146	124	+22	34.68	
Osasuna	(Spain)	14 June 2017	7 June 2018	44	17	16	11	47	37	+10	38.64	
Granada	(Spain)	14 June 2018	27 May 2021	146	69	30	47	202	167	+35	47.26	
Espanyol	(Spain)	31 May 2022	3 April 2023	31	9	9	13	40	46	−6	29.03	
Olympiacos	(Greece)	20 June 2023	5 December 2023	21	13	4	4	47	23	+24	61.90	
Las Palmas	(Spain)	8 October 2024	5 June 2025	32	10	5	17	40	49	−9	31.25	
Total				554	232	152	170	754	615	+139	41.88	—

== Honours ==
=== Manager ===
Individual

- Miguel Muñoz Trophy: 2018–19
