= Francisco Javier González Pérez =

Francisco Javier González Pérez may refer to:

- Fran (footballer, born 1969), Spanish retired midfielder
- Fran González (footballer, born 2005), Spanish goalkeeper
