= Moisés García =

Moisés García may refer to:

- Moisés García (footballer, born 1971), Spanish footballer
- Moisés García (footballer, born 1989), Spanish footballer
