= Sevilla FC C =

Spanish football club

Sevilla C
- Full name: Sevilla Fútbol Club, S.A.D. "C"
- Nicknames: Sevillistas; Rojiblancos (Red-Whites); Palanganas; Nervionenses
- Founded: 2003
- Ground: José Ramón Cisneros Palacios; Seville, Andalusia, Spain
- Capacity: 2,500
- President: José Castro Carmona
- Head coach: José Serrano
- League: Tercera Federación – Group 10
- 2025–26: Tercera Federación – Group 10, 16th of 18
Home colours	Away colours

Sevilla Fútbol Club "C" is the third team of Sevilla FC, a Spanish football team based in Seville, in the autonomous community of Andalusia. Founded in 2003, it plays in Tercera Federación – Group 10, holding its official matches in the Ciudad Deportiva José Ramón Cisneros Palacios, with a capacity for 2,500 spectators.

The team must play at least one division below Sevilla Atlético, who must themselves play one division lower than the main team Sevilla FC. Neither reserve team can enter the Copa del Rey.

== Season to season ==
Season	Tier	Division	Place
2003–04	8	2ª Reg.	1st
2004–05	7	1ª Reg.	1st
2005–06	6	Reg. Pref.	1st
2006–07	5	1ª And.	1st
2007–08	4	3ª	8th
2008–09	4	3ª	5th
2009–10	4	3ª	14th
2010–11	4	3ª	9th
2011–12	4	3ª	5th
2012–13	4	3ª	13th
2013–14	4	3ª	15th
2014–15	4	3ª	8th
2015–16	4	3ª	8th
2016–17	4	3ª	6th
2017–18	4	3ª	6th
2018–19	4	3ª	15th
2019–20	4	3ª	6th
2020–21	4	3ª	7th / 1st
2021–22	5	3ª RFEF	8th
2022–23	5	3ª Fed.	4th

Season	Tier	Division	Place
2023–24	5	3ª Fed.	16th
2024–25	5	3ª Fed.	13th
2025–26	5	3ª Fed.	16th
2026–27	5	3ª Fed.	

- 14 seasons in Tercera División
- 6 seasons in Tercera Federación/Tercera División RFEF

== Current squad ==
As of 1 September 2021

Note: Flags indicate national team as defined under FIFA eligibility rules; some limited exceptions apply. Players may hold more than one non-FIFA nationality.

No.	Pos.	Nation	Player
1	GK	ESP	David Gil
2	DF	ESP	Fran Ostos
3	DF	URU	Juancho Villegas
4	MF	ESP	Juanan Aguilera
5	DF	ESP	Dani García
6	MF	ESP	Marcelo Expósito
7	FW	ESP	Pochito
8	MF	ESP	Manolo Vázquez
9	FW	ESP	Rubén Catalá
10	MF	ESP	Alejandro Vázquez
11	FW	ESP	Mario Naranjo
12	FW	ESP	Gabri Martinez

No.	Pos.	Nation	Player
13	GK	ESP	Rafael Romero
14	MF	ESP	Pablo Rivera
15	DF	ESP	Juanan Toro
16	DF	ESP	Diego Jiménez
17	FW	ESP	Daniel Lidueña
18	FW	ESP	Raúl Gómez
19	DF	ESP	Iker Muñoz
20	DF	ESP	Sergio Veces
21	MF	ESP	José Antonio Bozada
22	GK	ESP	José Castillo
23	FW	ESP	Nando Raposo (on loan from Sanluqueño)

=== Reserve team ===
Note: Flags indicate national team as defined under FIFA eligibility rules; some limited exceptions apply. Players may hold more than one non-FIFA nationality.

No.	Pos.	Nation	Player
24	DF	ESP	Jorge Mariano
25	DF	ESP	Álvaro Díaz
26	DF	ESP	Genís Torrelles
27	DF	ESP	Iván Soldán
28	MF	ESP	Emilio Benítez
29	FW	SEN	Ibrahima Sow
30	DF	ESP	Antonio Soriano
31	FW	SEN	Bakary Sow

No.	Pos.	Nation	Player
32	DF	ESP	David López
33	MF	ESP	Carlos Sanchez
34	GK	ESP	Carlos Rodríguez
35	DF	ESP	Alberto Espiñeira
36	MF	ESP	Gonzalo Ballesteros
37	MF	ESP	Nacho Vizcaíno
38	FW	ESP	Dani Herrera
39	FW	ESP	Carlos Colomer

=== Current technical staff ===
Position	Staff
Manager	(Spain) José Serrano
Assistant manager	(Spain) Álvaro Jurado
Match delegate	(Spain) Juan Espinar

Last updated: May 2019
Source: Sevilla FC

== Selected former players ==
- (Spain) José Carlos
- (Spain) Jozabed
- (Spain) Raúl Navas
- (Spain) Dani Jiménez
- (Spain) Julián Cuesta
- (Spain) Samuel de los Reyes
- (Spain) Luis Alberto
- (Spain) Sergio Rico
- (Spain) Jesús Alfaro
- (Spain) Moisés García
- (Spain) Abel Moreno Zorrero
- (Spain) Salvi Sánchez
- (Spain) Jairo Morillas
- (Spain) Eliseo Falcón
- (Spain) Carlos Neva
- (Spain) Luis Pérez
- (China) Gui Hong
- (Spain) Gerard Valentín
- (Spain) Luismi
- (Spain) Churripi
- (Spain) David Soria
- (Spain) Carlos Fernández

== Selected former coaches ==
- (Spain) Diego (2008-2009)
- (Spain) Francisco (2009-2010)
- (Spain) Diego Martínez (2010-2011)
- (Spain) Fermín Galeote (2011–2013)
- (Spain) Chesco Garramiola (2013–2015)
- (Spain) Paco Peña (2016–2018)
- (Spain) Lolo Rosano (2018-)
