= Zachary Athekame =

Swiss footballer (born 2004)

Personal information
- Full name: Zachary Christopher Athekame
- Date of birth: 13 December 2004 (age 21)
- Place of birth: Geneva, Switzerland
- Height: 1.81 m (5 ft 11 in)
- Positions: Right-back; right wing-back

Team information
- Current team: Lyon (on loan from AC Milan)
- Number: 13

Youth career
- 2012–2013: Athlétique-Régina FC
- 2013–2016: Olympique de Genève FC
- 2016–2019: Servette
- 2019–2022: Meyrin
- 2022: Neuchâtel Xamax

Senior career*
Years	Team	Apps	(Gls)
2022–2024	Neuchâtel Xamax	30	(1)
2024–2025	Young Boys	34	(0)
2024	→ Neuchâtel Xamax (loan)	17	(1)
2025–	AC Milan	27	(2)
2026–	→ Lyon (loan)	9	(2)

International career^{‡}
2023–	Switzerland U21	17	(0)
2026–	Switzerland	6	(0)
- * Club domestic league appearances and goals as of 23:45, 8 November 2026 (UTC) ‡ National team caps and goals as of 22:10, 16 November 2026 (UTC)

Zachary Christopher Athekame (born 13 December 2004) is a Swiss professional footballer who plays as a right-back and right wing-back for Ligue 1 club Lyon, on loan from Serie A club AC Milan, and the Switzerland national team.

== Club career ==
=== Early career ===
Athekame spent his youth career at Swiss clubs Athlétique-Régina FC, Olympique de Genève FC, Servette and Meyrin.

=== Neuchâtel Xamax ===
He joined Neuchâtel Xamax in February 2022, then playing in the Swiss Challenge League, subsequently signing his first professional contract with the club on 12 December 2022.

=== Young Boys ===
On 30 December 2023, Swiss Super League club Young Boys announced an agreement to sign Athekame until 2028, and he was loaned back to Neuchâtel Xamax for the second half of the 2023–24 season.

=== AC Milan ===
On 15 August 2025, Athekame signed a five-year contract with Italian club AC Milan. Later that year, on 24 October, he scored his first league goal for the club in stoppage time of a 2–2 draw with Pisa.

==== Loan to Lyon ====
On 14 August 2026, Athekame joined French side Lyon, on loan for the 2026–27 season.

== International career ==
Born in Geneva, Switzerland, Athekame's father is Nigerian and his mother is Swiss from Neuchâtel. He is a Swiss youth international, having debuted for the Switzerland U21s in September 2023.

He was called-up for the first time with the senior Switzerland national team by head coach Murat Yakin for the 2026 FIFA World Cup qualification match against Slovenia on 13 October 2025, in which Athekame did not play during a goalless draw.

On 26 September 2026, Athekame made his senior international debut in a 2026–27 UEFA Nations League B game against North Macedonia.

== Career statistics ==
=== Club ===
As of match played 8 November 2026

Appearances and goals by club, season and competition
Club	Season	League			National cup (Note: Includes Swiss Cup, Coppa Italia)		Europe		Other		Total	
Club	Season	Division	Apps	Goals	Apps	Goals	Apps	Goals	Apps	Goals	Apps	Goals
Neuchâtel Xamax	2022–23	Swiss Challenge League	12	0	0	0	—		2 (Note: Appearances in Swiss Challenge League promotion play-offs)	0	14	0
Neuchâtel Xamax	2023–24 (Note: Part of the season spent on loan from Young Boys)	Swiss Challenge League	35	2	2	0	—		—		37	2
Neuchâtel Xamax	Total		47	2	2	0	—		2	0	51	2
Young Boys	2024–25	Swiss Super League	30	0	5	1	8 (Note: Appearances in UEFA Champions League)	0	—		43	1
Young Boys	2025–26	Swiss Super League	4	0	—		—		—		4	0
Young Boys	Total		34	0	5	1	8	0	—		47	1
AC Milan	2025–26	Serie A	27	2	1	0	—		1 (Note: Appearance in Supercoppa Italiana)	0	29	2
AC Milan	Total		27	2	1	0	—		1	0	29	2
Lyon (loan)	2026–27	Ligue 1	9	2	0	0	2 (Note: One appearance in UEFA Champions League, one appearance in UEFA Europa League)	0	—		11	2
Career total			117	6	8	1	10	0	3	0	138	7

=== International ===
As of match played 16 November 2026

Appearances and goals by national team and year
National team	Year	Apps	Goals
Switzerland	2026	6	0
Total		6	0
