= Moisés García (footballer, born 1989) =

Spanish footballer

Personal information
- Full name: Moisés García Rosa
- Date of birth: 31 October 1989 (age 37)
- Place of birth: Seville, Spain
- Height: 1.83 m (6 ft 0 in)
- Position: Centre back

Youth career
- 1998–2008: Sevilla

Senior career*
Years	Team	Apps	(Gls)
2008–2010	Sevilla C	31	(0)
2009–2011	Sevilla B	42	(1)
2011–2013	Sporting Gijón B	56	(2)
2012	Sporting Gijón	3	(0)
2013–2014	Ourense	25	(0)
2014–2015	Logroñés	36	(1)
2015–2019	Cartagena	124	(5)
2019–2020	San Fernando	17	(0)
2020–2021	Hércules	14	(1)
2021–2023	La Nucía	44	(5)
2023	Badajoz	8	(0)
2024	Cerdanyola del Vallès	8	(0)
- * Club domestic league appearances and goals as of 19 May 2024

Moisés García Rosa (born 31 October 1989) is a Spanish professional footballer who plays as a central defender.

== Club career ==
Born in Seville, García joined local Sevilla FC's youth system at the age of eight, making his senior debut with the C side in the 2008–09 season, in the Tercera División. On 31 January 2009 he first appeared with the reserves, starting and scoring the equaliser in a 1–1 away draw against Albacete Balompié in the Segunda División.

On 20 July 2011, García rejected a new deal from the Andalusians and signed with another reserve team, Sporting de Gijón B of the Segunda División B. He made his main squad – and La Liga – debut on 14 April 2012, starting in a 3–1 loss at Real Madrid.

On 9 July 2013, García joined CD Ourense also in division three. After the Galicians' dissolution, he moved to fellow league club UD Logroñés on 26 June of the following year.

García continued competing in the third tier the following years, representing FC Cartagena, San Fernando CD and Hércules CF.
