= Robbie Ure =

Scottish footballer (born 2004)

Personal information
- Full name: Robert Philip Thomas Ure
- Date of birth: 24 February 2004 (age 22)
- Place of birth: Glasgow, Scotland
- Height: 1.89 m (6 ft 2 in)
- Position: Striker

Team information
- Current team: Sevilla
- Number: 9

Youth career
- 2020–2022: Rangers

Senior career*
Years	Team	Apps	(Gls)
2022–2023	Rangers	2	(0)
2023–2025	RSCA Futures	38	(11)
2024–2025	Anderlecht	1	(0)
2025–2026	Sirius	45	(26)
2026–	Sevilla	13	(1)

International career^{‡}
2022	Scotland U19	5	(2)
2026–	Scotland	4	(0)
- * Club domestic league appearances and goals as of 21 November 2026 (UTC) ‡ National team caps and goals as of 6 October 2026

Robert Philip Thomas Ure (Note: Traditionally pronounced /jʊə(r)/ in Received Pronunciation, though /jɔː(r)/ is now also common in English speech; in Scotland, the surname is commonly pronounced /jʉːr/.) (born 24 February 2004) is a Scottish professional footballer who plays as a striker for La Liga club Sevilla and the Scotland national team.

== Early career ==
Ure began playing football with Barrhead Boys Club at the age of five, before joining the Rangers youth academy.

== Club career ==
Ure, a product of the Rangers youth academy, signed a contract extension with the club until the summer of 2023 in June 2021. He made his Rangers debut on 30 August 2022, starting in a League Cup match at home to Queen of the South and scored his first professional goal ten minutes into the game. He had to wait almost three months for his next senior appearance, as a late substitute appearance in a Scottish Premiership match away to St Mirren on 12 November 2022. In May 2023, Ure left Rangers after rejecting a contract extension. He Trained With Kilmarnock and Queen's Park and played 2 behind closed doors games with the club.

On 6 September 2023, Ure signed for Belgian club Anderlecht for their reserve team RSCA Futures that plays in the second-tier Challenger Pro League.

On 13 March 2025, Ure signed for Swedish club Sirius on a contract until the end of 2029. He scored 15 goals in the first half of the 2026 Allsvenskan season, helping his club move to the top of the table while remaining unbeaten.

On 11 August 2026, Ure signed a five-year contract with La Liga side Sevilla. The transfer fee was reportedly €6.5 million, with a further €2.5 million in add-ons. He made his league debut four days later as a substitute against Rayo Vallecano.

== International career ==
He has represented Scotland at youth international level, making five appearances for the under-19 team and scoring twice. On 15 September 2026, Ure received his first call-up to the senior Scotland squad under head coach Sébastien Pocognoli, for UEFA Nations League matches against Slovenia, Switzerland and North Macedonia.

== Personal life ==
Ure has Ukrainian descent through a grandfather.

== Career statistics ==
=== Club ===
As of match played 21 November 2026

Appearances and goals by club, season and competition
Club	Season	League			National cup (Note: Includes Svenska Cupen, Copa del Rey)		League cup (Note: Includes Scottish League Cup)		Europe		Other		Total	
Club	Season	Division	Apps	Goals	Apps	Goals	Apps	Goals	Apps	Goals	Apps	Goals	Apps	Goals
Rangers B	2021–22	—			—		—		—		2 (Note: Appearances in Scottish Challenge Cup)	0	2	0
Rangers B	2022–23	—			—		—		—		2	0	2	0
Rangers B	Total		—		—		—		—		4	0	4	0
Rangers	2022–23	Scottish Premiership	2	0	0	0	1	1	0	0	—		3	1
RSCA Futures	2023–24	Challenger Pro League	16	5	—		—		—		—		16	5
RSCA Futures	2024–25	Challenger Pro League	22	7	—		—		—		—		22	7
RSCA Futures	Total		38	12	—		—		—		—		38	12
Anderlecht	2023–24	Belgian Pro League	1	0	0	0	—		—		—		1	0
Sirius	2025	Allsvenskan	30	11	0	0	—		—		—		30	11
Sirius	2026	Allsvenskan	15	15	5	5	—		—		—		20	20
Sirius	Total		45	26	5	5	—		—		—		50	31
Sevilla	2026–27	La Liga	13	1	1	1	—		—		—		14	2
Career total			99	39	6	6	1	0	0	0	4	1	110	46

=== International ===
As of match played 6 October 2026

Appearances and goals by national team and year
National team	Year	Apps	Goals
Scotland	2026	4	0
Total		4	0
