= Youssouf Fofana (footballer, born 1999) =

French footballer (born 1999)

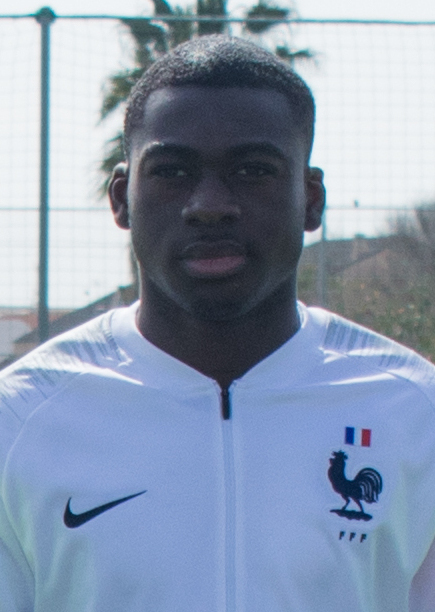
- Fofana with France U20 in 2019

Personal information
- Full name: Youssouf Fofana
- Date of birth: 10 January 1999 (age 27)
- Place of birth: Paris, France
- Height: 1.85 m (6 ft 1 in)
- Position: Midfielder

Team information
- Current team: Sevilla (on loan from AC Milan)
- Number: 24

Youth career
- 2005–2013: Espérance Paris 19ème
- 2013–2014: Red Star
- 2014–2017: Drancy
- 2017–2018: Strasbourg

Senior career*
| Years | Team | Apps | (Gls) |
| 2017–2018 | Strasbourg B | 34 | (4) |
| 2018–2020 | Strasbourg | 30 | (3) |
| 2020–2024 | Monaco | 143 | (6) |
| 2024– | AC Milan | 68 | (3) |
| 2026– | → Sevilla (loan) | 10 | (1) |

International career
| 2018 | France U19 | 1 | (0) |
| 2018–2019 | France U20 | 9 | (1) |
| 2019 | France U21 | 1 | (0) |
| 2022–2024 | France | 25 | (3) |
Medal record
Men's football
Representing France
FIFA World Cup
| Runner-up | 2022 Qatar |
- * Club domestic league appearances and goals as of 23:45, 21 November 2026 (UTC)

Youssouf Fofana (born 10 January 1999) is a French professional footballer who plays as a midfielder for La Liga club Sevilla, on loan from Serie A club AC Milan.

== Personal life ==
Youssouf Fofana was born on 10 January 1999 in Paris. He is of Malian and Ivorian descent.

== Club career ==
=== Strasbourg ===
Fofana began his career with various youth academies in Paris, before joining the youth academy of Strasbourg on 21 February 2017. He made his professional debut with Strasbourg in a 2–0 Ligue 1 loss to Lyon on 24 August 2018.

=== Monaco ===
Fofana played his final game for Strasbourg on 25 January 2020, a 3–1 away win over Monaco. Four days later, he was signed by Monaco for €15 million, and made his debut on 1 February, playing 71 minutes of a 3–1 away defeat to Nîmes. On 25 November 2021, Fofana scored his first goal for Monaco, the winning goal in a 2–1 UEFA Europa League victory at home over Real Sociedad. He scored his first league goal with the club in a 4–2 home defeat to Troyes on 31 August 2022.

=== AC Milan ===
On 17 August 2024, Fofana completed his move to Italian club AC Milan, signing a four-year contract until 30 June 2028. He chose the kit number 29.

On 14 September 2024, Milan won 4–0 against Venezia in Serie A. The second goal, a header following the corner kick, had initially been attributed to Matteo Gabbia prior to Fofana being credited with the goal after a review.

==== Loan to Sevilla ====
On 1 September 2026, he joined Spanish club Sevilla, on loan for the 2026–27 season.

== International career ==
Fofana was a youth international for France from under-19 to under-21 level.

On 15 September 2022, Fofana received his first call-up to the France national team for two UEFA Nations League matches against Austria and Denmark. In November, he was called up for the 2022 FIFA World Cup in Qatar by Didier Deschamps. At the tournament, he played in six of France's seven matches, starting the ones against Tunisia in the group stage (1–0 loss) and Morocco in the semi-finals (2–0 win). In the final against Argentina on 18 December, Fofana came on as a 96th-minute substitute in extra time for Adrien Rabiot. The game ended with a score of 3–3, and Argentina came out victorious on penalties.

On 18 November 2023, Fofana scored his first goal with France, the seventh goal of a 14–0 win over Gibraltar in UEFA Euro 2024 qualifying. In the following match against Greece, he scored in a goal from twenty-five metres out in a 2–2 draw.

== Style of play ==
Fofana is a defensive midfielder, with the preference to play just in front of defense. His main qualities are his physical strength, stamina, and the ability to press opponents to win back possession of the ball. Managed by Massimiliano Allegri at AC Milan, Fofana also began to play as a right-sided box-to-box midfielder in a 3–5–2 formation. Initially struggling with the change and openly expressing concern about his future at the club and the national team, Fofana was eventually able to adapt and even scored a number of goals by cutting into the opposition's penalty area.

== Career statistics ==
=== Club ===
As of match played 21 November 2026

Appearances and goals by club, season and competition
| Club | Season | League | | | National cup (Note: Includes Coupe de France, Coppa Italia) | | League cup (Note: Includes Coupe de la Ligue) | | Europe | | Other | | Total | |
| Club | Season | Division | Apps | Goals | Apps | Goals | Apps | Goals | Apps | Goals | Apps | Goals | Apps | Goals |
|---|---|---|---|---|---|---|---|---|---|---|---|---|---|---|
| Strasbourg B | 2017–18 | National 3 | 29 | 3 | — | | — | | — | | — | | 29 | 3 |
| Strasbourg B | 2018–19 | National 3 | 5 | 1 | — | | — | | — | | — | | 5 | 1 |
| Strasbourg B | Total | | 34 | 4 | — | | — | | — | | — | | 34 | 4 |
| Strasbourg | 2018–19 | Ligue 1 | 17 | 2 | 1 | 0 | 4 | 1 | — | | — | | 22 | 3 |
| Strasbourg | 2019–20 | Ligue 1 | 13 | 1 | 1 | 0 | 2 | 0 | 3 (Note: Appearances in UEFA Europa League) | 0 | — | | 19 | 1 |
| Strasbourg | Total | | 30 | 3 | 2 | 0 | 6 | 1 | 3 | 0 | — | | 41 | 4 |
| Monaco | 2019–20 | Ligue 1 | 7 | 0 | — | | — | | — | | — | | 7 | 0 |
| Monaco | 2020–21 | Ligue 1 | 35 | 0 | 5 | 0 | — | | — | | — | | 40 | 0 |
| Monaco | 2021–22 | Ligue 1 | 33 | 0 | 4 | 0 | — | | 9 (Note: Four appearances in UEFA Champions League, five appearances and one goal in UEFA Europa League) | 1 | — | | 46 | 1 |
| Monaco | 2022–23 | Ligue 1 | 36 | 2 | 1 | 0 | — | | 10 (Note: Two appearances in UEFA Champions League, eight appearances in UEFA Europa League) | 0 | — | | 47 | 2 |
| Monaco | 2023–24 | Ligue 1 | 32 | 4 | 3 | 0 | — | | — | | — | | 35 | 4 |
| Monaco | Total | | 143 | 6 | 13 | 0 | — | | 19 | 1 | — | | 175 | 7 |
| AC Milan | 2024–25 | Serie A | 35 | 1 | 5 | 0 | — | | 10 (Note: Appearances in UEFA Champions League) | 0 | 2 (Note: Appearance(s) in Supercoppa Italiana) | 0 | 52 | 1 |
| AC Milan | 2025–26 | Serie A | 33 | 2 | 2 | 0 | — | | — | | 1 | 0 | 36 | 2 |
| AC Milan | Total | | 68 | 3 | 7 | 0 | — | | 10 | 0 | 3 | 0 | 88 | 3 |
| Sevilla (loan) | 2026–27 | La Liga | 10 | 1 | 0 | 0 | — | | — | | — | | 10 | 1 |
| Career total | | | 285 | 17 | 22 | 0 | 6 | 1 | 32 | 1 | 3 | 0 | 348 | 19 |

=== International ===
As of match played 14 October 2024

Appearances and goals by national team and year
| National team | Year | Apps | Goals |
|---|---|---|---|
| France | 2022 | 8 | 0 |
| France | 2023 | 7 | 2 |
| France | 2024 | 10 | 1 |
| Total | | 25 | 3 |

Scores and results list France's goal tally first, score column indicates score after each Fofana goal.

List of international goals scored by Youssouf Fofana
| No. | Date | Venue | Cap | Opponent | Score | Result | Competition |
|---|---|---|---|---|---|---|---|
| 1 | 18 November 2023 | Allianz Riviera, Nice, France | 14 | Gibraltar | 7–0 | 14–0 | UEFA Euro 2024 qualifying |
| 2 | 21 November 2023 | Agia Sophia Stadium, Athens, Greece | 15 | Greece | 2–2 | 2–2 | UEFA Euro 2024 qualifying |
| 3 | 26 March 2024 | Stade Vélodrome, Marseille, France | 17 | Chile | 1–1 | 3–2 | Friendly |

== Honours ==
Strasbourg

- Coupe de la Ligue: 2018–19

Monaco

- Coupe de France runner-up: 2020–21

AC Milan

- Supercoppa Italiana: 2024–25

France

- FIFA World Cup runner-up: 2022
