= Arouna Sangante =

Senegalese footballer

Personal information
- Date of birth: 12 April 2002 (age 24)
- Place of birth: Dakar, Senegal
- Height: 1.89 m (6 ft 2 in)
- Positions: Centre-back; right-back

Team information
- Current team: Sevilla
- Number: 12

Youth career
- Cosmos Saint-Denis
- 2015–2017: Red Star
- 2017–2020: Le Havre

Senior career*
Years	Team	Apps	(Gls)
2018–2020	Le Havre B	28	(0)
2020–2026	Le Havre	142	(8)
2026–	Sevilla	0	(0)
- * Club domestic league appearances and goals as of 17 May 2026

Arouna Sangante (born 12 April 2002) is a Senegalese professional footballer who plays as a centre-back for La Liga club Sevilla.

== Club career ==
Arouna Sangante played for Cosmos Saint-Denis and Red Star in Île-de-France, before joining Le Havre in 2017.

He made his Ligue 2 debut for Le Havre on the 15 May 2021, starting the game against the league champions of Troyes.

On 16 June 2026, Sangante signed a five-year contract with La Liga side Sevilla.

== International career ==
Sangante was one of the players who were called up with the Senegal national team by head coach Patrick Vieira for the 2027 Africa Cup of Nations qualification matches against Mozambique and Ethiopia on 25 and 29 September 2026, respectively; and the friendly match against Comoros on 4 October 2026.

== Career statistics ==
As of match played 17 May 2026

Appearances and goals by club, season and competition
Club	Season	League			National cup (Note: Includes Coupe de France, FA Cup)		Continental		Other		Total	
Club	Season	Division	Apps	Goals	Apps	Goals	Apps	Goals	Apps	Goals	Apps	Goals
Le Havre B	2018–19	National 2	16	0	—		—		—		16	0
Le Havre B	2019–20	National 3	8	0	—		—		—		8	0
Le Havre B	2020–21	National 3	4	0	—		—		—		4	0
Le Havre B	Total		28	0	—		—		—		28	0
Le Havre	2020–21	Ligue 2	1	0	1	0	—		—		2	0
Le Havre	2021–22	Ligue 2	32	1	2	0	—		—		34	1
Le Havre	2022–23	Ligue 2	35	3	0	0	—		—		35	3
Le Havre	2023–24	Ligue 1	30	0	1	0	—		—		31	0
Le Havre	2024–25	Ligue 1	16	3	0	0	—		—		16	3
Le Havre	2025–26	Ligue 1	28	1	1	0	—		—		29	1
Le Havre	Total		142	8	5	0	—		—		147	8
Sevilla	2026–27	La Liga	0	0	0	0	—		—		0	0
Career total			170	8	5	0	0	0	0	0	175	8

== Honours ==
Individual

- UNFP Ligue 2 Team of the Year: 2022–23
