= David Odogu =

German footballer (born 2006)

Personal information
- Full name: David Uyoyo Odogu
- Date of birth: 3 June 2006 (age 20)
- Place of birth: Berlin, Germany
- Height: 1.91 m (6 ft 3 in)
- Position: Centre-back

Team information
- Current team: Toulouse (on loan from AC Milan)
- Number: 19

Youth career
- Steglitzer SC Südwest
- Hertha Zehlendorf
- 2019–2020: Union Berlin
- 2020–2025: VfL Wolfsburg

Senior career*
Years	Team	Apps	(Gls)
2023–2025	VfL Wolfsburg	3	(0)
2025–	AC Milan	2	(0)
2025–	Milan Futuro (res.)	3	(0)
2026–	→ Toulouse (loan)	0	(0)

International career^{‡}
2021–2022	Germany U16	3	(0)
2022–2023	Germany U17	12	(0)
2024	Germany U18	3	(0)
2024–	Germany U19	3	(0)
2025–	Germany U20	9	(0)
Medal record
Men's football
Representing Germany
FIFA U-17 World Cup
Winner	2023 Indonesia
UEFA European Under-17 Championship
Winner	2023 Hungary
- * Club domestic league appearances and goals as of 23:30, 21 March 2026 (UTC) ‡ National team caps and goals as of 22:45, 16 November 2026 (UTC)

David Uyoyo Odogu (born 3 June 2006) is a German professional footballer who plays as a centre-back for Ligue 1 club Toulouse, on loan from Serie A club AC Milan. He is a German youth international.

== Club career ==
=== VfL Wolfsburg ===
Born in Berlin, Odogu played for the youth academies of Steglitzer SC Südwest and Hertha Zehlendorf, before spending a season with the youth academy of Union Berlin. He moved to Bundesliga club VfL Wolfsburg in 2020, initially joining the youth academy. In December 2022, he signed a new contract with VfL Wolfsburg. In January 2023, he attended mid-season training camp with the VfL Wolfsburg first-team squad. Odogu finished runner-up with VfL Wolfsburg under-17 in the U17 Nachwuchsliga at the end of the 2022–23 season.

=== AC Milan ===
On 1 September 2025, he moved to Italy and joined Serie A club AC Milan, permanently for an estimated €10 million transfer fee ahead of the 2025–26 season.

On 23 September, Odogu made his debut for the club in a 3–0 Coppa Italia home victory over Lecce, substituting Strahinja Pavlović. One day later, he debuted for AC Milan's reserve team Milan Futuro on 24 September, starting in a goalless draw Serie D Group B away match against Casatese Merate. On 28 December, he made his league debut with AC Milan substituting Fikayo Tomori during the second half of a 3-0 win over Hellas Verona.

==== Loan to Toulouse ====
On 18 August 2026, Odogu joined French club Toulouse, on loan for the 2026–27 season.

== International career ==
A Germany youth international, Odogu featured for the Germany side that won the final of the 2023 UEFA European Under-17 Championship in Hungary, and the 2023 FIFA U-17 World Cup in Indonesia.

== Style of play ==
Odogu is described as a tall defender, capable of playing on the right or left side of central defence. Combining physical strength, with speed and a good tackling ability he has been compared to German international defender Antonio Rüdiger.

== Personal life ==
Born in Germany, Odogu has Nigerian heritage through his father. His parents and his sister attended the 2023 UEFA European U17 Championship final, which Germany won against France, but Odogu didn't play however. While he was away he continued with his education, and even sat exams in History and Geography during the tournament.

Odogu married his wife, Naemi, on June 6th, 2026.

== Career statistics ==
As of match played 21 March 2026

Appearances and goals by club, season and competition
Club	Season	League			Cup (Note: Includes Coppa Italia)		Continental		Other		Total	
Club	Season	Division	Apps	Goals	Apps	Goals	Apps	Goals	Apps	Goals	Apps	Goals
VfL Wolfsburg	2024–25	Bundesliga	3	0	0	0	—		—		3	0
VfL Wolfsburg	Total		3	0	0	0	—		—		3	0
AC Milan	2025–26	Serie A	2	0	1	0	—		0	0	3	0
AC Milan	Total		2	0	1	0	—		0	0	3	0
Milan Futuro	2025–26	Serie D	3	0	0	0	—		0	0	3	0
Milan Futuro	Total		3	0	0	0	—		0	0	3	0
Career total			8	0	1	0	0	0	0	0	9	0

== Honours ==
Germany U17

- UEFA European Under-17 Championship: 2023
- FIFA U-17 World Cup: 2023
