= José Serrano (footballer, born 1981) =

Spanish footballer

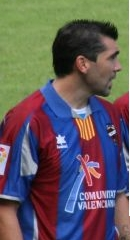
- Serrano with Levante in 2007

Personal information
- Full name: José Manuel Serrano Arenas
- Date of birth: 17 March 1981 (age 45)
- Place of birth: Seville, Spain
- Height: 1.83 m (6 ft 0 in)
- Position: Defender

Team information
- Current team: Rodina Moscow (assistant)

Youth career
- Sevilla

Senior career*
Years	Team	Apps	(Gls)
1999–2004	Sevilla B	152	(6)
2004–2005	Xerez	24	(0)
2005–2007	Levante B	52	(2)
2007–2008	Levante	39	(1)
2008–2010	Rayo Vallecano	20	(0)
2010–2012	Cádiz	28	(3)
2012–2013	Torreblanca		
2013–2018	Alcalá	174	(5)
Total		489+	(17+)

International career
1997–1998	Spain U16	7	(0)
1998–1999	Spain U17	12	(0)
1999–2000	Spain U18	5	(0)

Managerial career
- 2023–2024: Sevilla C
- * Club domestic league appearances and goals

José Manuel Serrano Arenas (born 17 March 1981) is a Spanish former professional footballer who played as a defender. He is currently assistant manager of Russian Premier League club Rodina Moscow.

== Club career ==
Serrano was born in Seville, Andalusia. After spending four years with local Sevilla FC's reserves, without any first-team appearances, he stayed one season with neighbouring Segunda División side Xerez CD and then switched to Levante UD.

Initially, Serrano played almost exclusively with the reserves in the Segunda División B, making his first-team and La Liga debut aged 25 years and 10 months in a 2–4 home defeat against Sevilla on 28 January 2007. The following campaign, he scored in a 1–5 loss to Valencia CF also at the Estadi Ciutat de València as Levante were already relegated.

For 2008–09, Serrano joined Madrid club Rayo Vallecano, recently returned to the second division, appearing in only 20 league games out of 84 over two years and being released, after which he signed a two-year contract with Cádiz CF, returning to his native region.

On 19 August 2013, the 32-year-old Serrano moved to amateurs CD Alcalá from Tercera División.
