= 2025–26 AC Milan season =

AC Milan
2025–26 season
- Owner: RedBird Capital Partners (99.93%); Private shareholders (0.07%)
- Chairman: Paolo Scaroni
- Head coach: Massimiliano Allegri
- Stadium: San Siro
- Serie A: 5th
- Coppa Italia: Round of 16
- Supercoppa Italiana: Semi-finals
- Top goalscorer: League: Rafael Leão (9); All: Rafael Leão; Christian Pulisic (10 each)
- Highest home attendance: 75,681 vs Juventus; 26 April 2026, Serie A
- Lowest home attendance: 54,418 vs Lecce; 23 September 2025, Coppa Italia
- Average home league attendance: 73,373
- Biggest win: 3–0 vs Udinese (A); 20 September 2025, Serie A 3–0 vs Lecce (H); 23 September 2025, Coppa Italia; 3–0 vs Hellas Verona (H); 28 December 2025, Serie A 3–0 vs Bologna (A); 3 February 2026, Serie A
- Biggest defeat: 0–3 vs Udinese (H); 11 April 2026, Serie A
Home colours	Away colours	Third colours

The 2025–26 season was the 127th season in the existence of AC Milan, and the club's 92nd season in the top flight of Italian football. In addition to the domestic league, Milan also participated in the Coppa Italia and the Supercoppa Italiana.

== Players ==
=== Squad information ===
As of 24 May 2026

No.	Player	Nat.	Position(s)	Date of birth (age)	Signed in	Contract ends	Signed from	Transfer fee	Notes	Apps	Goals
Goalkeepers
1	Pietro Terracciano	(Italy)	GK	8 March 1990 (age 36)	2025	2026	(Italy) Fiorentina	Free		2	0
16	Mike Maignan (captain)	(France)	GK	3 July 1995 (age 31)	2021	2031	(France) Lille	€13,000,000		203	0
96	Lorenzo Torriani	(Italy)	GK	31 January 2005 (age 21)	2024	2030	(Italy) Milan Primavera	—N/a	From Youth system	2	0
Defenders
2	Pervis Estupiñán	(Ecuador)	LB / LM	17 January 1998 (age 28)	2025	2030	(England) Brighton	€17,000,000		22	1
5	Koni De Winter	(Belgium)	CB / RB	12 June 2002 (age 24)	2025	2030	(Italy) Genoa	€20,000,000		29	1
23	Fikayo Tomori	(England)	CB / RB	19 December 1997 (age 28)	2021	2027	(England) Chelsea	€28,500,000		214	7
24	Zachary Athekame	(Switzerland)	RB / RM	13 December 2004 (age 21)	2025	2030	(Switzerland) Young Boys	€10,000,000		29	2
27	David Odogu	(Germany)	CB	3 June 2006 (age 20)	2025	2030	(Germany) Wolfsburg	€7,000,000		3	0
31	Strahinja Pavlović	(Serbia)	CB	24 May 2001 (age 25)	2024	2028	(Austria) Red Bull Salzburg	€18,000,000		72	7
33	Davide Bartesaghi	(Italy)	LB / CB / LM	29 December 2005 (age 20)	2023	2030	(Italy) Milan Primavera	—N/a	From Youth system	48	2
46	Matteo Gabbia (3rd captain)	(Italy)	CB / DM	21 October 1999 (age 27)	2017	2029	(Italy) Milan Primavera	—N/a	From Youth system	143	6
Midfielders
4	Samuele Ricci	(Italy)	CM / DM	21 August 2001 (age 25)	2025	2029	(Italy) Torino	€23,000,000		34	1
8	Ruben Loftus-Cheek	(England)	CM / AM / DM	23 January 1996 (age 30)	2023	2027	(England) Chelsea	€16,000,000		99	13
11	Christian Pulisic	(United States)	AM / RW / LW	18 September 1998 (age 28)	2023	2027	(England) Chelsea	€20,000,000		135	42
12	Adrien Rabiot	(France)	CM / DM / AM	3 April 1995 (age 31)	2025	2028	(France) Marseille	€9,000,000		32	6
14	Luka Modrić	(Croatia)	DM / CM / AM	9 September 1985 (age 41)	2025	2026	(Spain) Real Madrid	Free		37	2
19	Youssouf Fofana	(France)	CM / DM	1 October 1999 (age 27)	2024	2028	(France) Monaco	€20,000,000		87	3
30	Ardon Jashari	(Switzerland)	DM / CM	30 July 2002 (age 24)	2025	2030	(Belgium) Club Brugge	€34,000,000		17	0
56	Alexis Saelemaekers	(Belgium)	RM / LM / RB	27 June 1999 (age 27)	2020	2031	(Belgium) Anderlecht	€7,200,000		180	13
Forwards
7	Santiago Giménez	(Mexico)	ST	18 April 2001 (age 25)	2025	2029	(Netherlands) Feyenoord	€32,000,000		37	7
9	Niclas Füllkrug	(Germany)	ST	9 February 1993 (age 33)	2026	2026	(England) West Ham United	Loan		20	1
10	Rafael Leão (2nd captain)	(Portugal)	LW / ST / AM	10 June 1999 (age 27)	2019	2028	(France) Lille	€28,000,000		291	80
18	Christopher Nkunku	(France)	ST / LW / AM	14 November 1997 (age 29)	2025	2030	(England) Chelsea	€37,000,000		35	8

== Transfers ==
=== Summer window ===
Deals officialised beforehand are effective starting from 1 July 2025, unless stated otherwise.

==== In ====
Date	Pos.	Player	Age	Moving from	Fee	Notes	Source
3 July 2025	MF	(Italy) Samuele Ricci	23	(Italy) Torino	€23,000,000	+ €1,500,000 add-ons	
14 July 2025	MF	(Croatia) Luka Modrić	39	(Spain) Real Madrid	Free	End of contract	
18 July 2025	GK	(Italy) Pietro Terracciano	35	(Italy) Fiorentina	Free		
24 July 2025	DF	(Ecuador) Pervis Estupiñán	27	(England) Brighton	€17,000,000	+ €2,000,000 add-ons	
6 August 2025	MF	(Switzerland) Ardon Jashari	23	(Belgium) Club Brugge	€34,000,000	+ €3,000,000 add-ons	
7 August 2025	DF	(United States) Astin Mbaye	16	(United States) New York Red Bulls	Undisclosed	Joined Milan Futuro	
12 August 2025	DF	(Turkey) Berkay Karaca	19	(Germany) Schalke 04	Free	Joined Milan Futuro	
13 August 2025	DF	(Belgium) Koni De Winter	23	(Italy) Genoa	€20,000,000	+ €5,000,000 add-ons	
14 August 2025	DF	(Italy) Mattia Piermarini	19	(Italy) Ascoli	Undisclosed	Joined Milan Futuro	
15 August 2025	DF	(Switzerland) Zachary Athekame	20	(Switzerland) Young Boys	€10,000,000		
21 August 2025	FW	(Suriname) Cheveyo Balentien	18	(Netherlands) ADO Den Haag	Undisclosed	Joined Milan Futuro	
30 August 2025	FW	(France) Christopher Nkunku	27	(England) Chelsea	€37,000,000	+ €5,000,000 add-ons	
1 September 2025	FW	(France) Adrien Rabiot	30	(France) Marseille	€9,000,000	+€1,000,000 add-ons	
1 September 2025	DF	(Germany) David Odogu	19	(Germany) Wolfsburg	€7,000,000	+ €3,000,000 add-ons	

==== Loan returns ====
Date	Pos.	Player	Age	Moving from	Fee	Notes	Source
30 June 2025	MF	(Belgium) Alexis Saelemaekers	26	(Italy) Roma	Free		
11 August 2025	FW	(Spain) Álvaro Morata	32	(Turkey) Galatasaray	€5,000,000	Early termination of loan	

Total spending: ▼€162M

==== Out ====
Date	Pos.	Player	Age	Moving to	Fee	Notes	Source
5 June 2025	DF	(France) Pierre Kalulu	25	(Italy) Juventus	€14,300,000	From loan to definitive purchase	
10 June 2025	DF	(Argentina) Marco Pellegrino	22	(Argentina) Boca Juniors	€4,000,000	After return from loan	
11 June 2025	MF	(Netherlands) Tijjani Reijnders	26	(England) Manchester City	€55,000,000	Deal immediately effective	
30 June 2025	DF	(Italy) Davide Calabria	28	(Greece) Panathinaikos	Free	After return from loan, end of contract	
30 June 2025	DF	(Italy) Alessandro Florenzi	34	Unattached	Retired		
30 June 2025	FW	(Serbia) Luka Jović	27	(Greece) AEK Athens	Free	End of contract	
30 June 2025	FW	(Italy) (Nigeria) Bob Omoregbe	21	(Serbia) Novi Pazar	Free	From Milan Futuro, end of contract	
1 July 2025	DF	(Italy) Michele Camporese	33	(Italy) Livorno	Free	From Milan Futuro, contract termination	
3 July 2025	MF	(Italy) Gabriele Alesi	21	(Italy) Catanzaro	Undisclosed	From Milan Futuro	
5 July 2025	DF	(Morocco) Adam Bakoune	19	(Italy) Monza	Free	From Primavera squad, end of contract	
10 July 2025	DF	(France) Théo Hernandez	27	(Saudi Arabia) Al-Hilal	€25,000,000		
11 July 2025	DF	(Italy) Andrea Bozzolan	21	(Italy) Reggiana	Undisclosed	From Milan Futuro	
17 July 2025	GK	(Italy) Lapo Nava	21	(Italy) Cremonese	Free	From Milan Futuro	
18 July 2025	GK	(Italy) Marco Sportiello	33	(Italy) Atalanta	€1,000,000		
23 July 2025	MF	(Italy) Mattia Sandri	26	(Italy) Crotone	Undisclosed	From Milan Futuro	
23 July 2025	GK	(France) Noah Raveyre	20	(France) Pau	Undisclosed	From Milan Futuro	
24 July 2025	DF	(Italy) Dorian Paloschi	19	(Switzerland) Grasshopper	Free	From Primavera squad	
25 July 2025	GK	(Colombia) Devis Vásquez	27	(Italy) Roma	Free	After return from loan, contract termination	
26 July 2025	DF	(Brazil) Emerson Royal	26	(Brazil) Flamengo	€9,000,000		
30 July 2025	DF	(Italy) Leonardo D'Alessio	21	(Italy) Novara	Undisclosed	From Milan Futuro	
8 August 2025	MF	(Italy) Mattia Liberali	18	(Italy) Catanzaro	Undisclosed	From Milan Futuro	
11 August 2025	DF	(Sweden) Fredrik Nissen	20	(Sweden) AIK	Undisclosed	From Primavera squad	
12 August 2025	DF	(Germany) Malick Thiaw	24	(England) Newcastle United	€38,000,000	+ €4,000,000 add-ons	
18 August 2025	FW	(Serbia) Marko Lazetić	21	(Scotland) Aberdeen	Undisclosed	After return from loan	
21 August 2025	FW	(Switzerland) Noah Okafor	25	(England) Leeds United	€19,000,000	+ €2,000,000 add-ons, after return from loan	
1 September 2025	DF	(Italy) Ettore Quirini	22	(Italy) Salernitana	Undisclosed	From Milan Futuro	
1 September 2025	MF	(Italy) Mattia Malaspina	20	(Italy) Novara	Undisclosed	From Milan Futuro	
8 September 2025	MF	(Poland) Mateusz Skoczylas	18	(Poland) Cracovia	Undisclosed	From Primavera squad	
10 September 2025	MF	(France) Yacine Adli	25	(Saudi Arabia) Al Shabab	€8,000,000	After return from loan	

==== Loans ended ====
Date	Pos.	Player	Age	Moving to	Fee	Notes	Source
30 June 2025	DF	(England) Kyle Walker	35	(England) Manchester City	Free	End of loan	
30 June 2025	FW	(England) Tammy Abraham	27	(Italy) Roma	Free	End of loan	
30 June 2025	FW	(Portugal) João Félix	25	(England) Chelsea	Free	End of loan	
30 June 2025	FW	(Italy) Riccardo Sottil	26	(Italy) Fiorentina	Free	End of loan	
30 June 2025	FW	(Italy) Simone Ianesi	23	(Italy) Pontedera	Free	End of loan, from Milan Futuro	
30 June 2025	FW	(Italy) Nicolò Turco	21	(Austria) Red Bull Salzburg	Free	End of loan, from Milan Futuro	

==== Loans out ====
Date	Pos.	Player	Age	Moving to	Fee	Notes	Source
18 June 2025	MF	(Italy) Kevin Zeroli	20	(Italy) Monza	Free	Loan extended	
7 July 2025	FW	(Italy) Francesco Camarda	17	(Italy) Lecce	Free	With option to buy	
22 July 2025	MF	(Italy) Tommaso Pobega	26	(Italy) Bologna	€1,000,000	Loan extended, with obligation to buy	
28 July 2025	FW	(Italy) Lorenzo Colombo	23	(Italy) Genoa	Free	With conditional obligation to buy	
4 August 2025	MF	(Italy) Christian Comotto	17	(Italy) Spezia	Free	From Primavera squad	
11 August 2025	DF	(Italy) Filippo Terracciano	22	(Italy) Cremonese	€500,000	With conditional obligation to buy	
12 August 2025	FW	(Spain) Álvaro Morata	32	(Italy) Como	€1,000,000	With conditional obligation to buy	
12 August 2025	MF	(France) Warren Bondo	21	(Italy) Cremonese	€500,000		
15 August 2025	DF	(Italy) Vittorio Magni	19	(Italy) Cesena	Free	From Milan Futuro, with option to buy	
30 August 2025	DF	(Romania) Andrei Coubiș	21	(Italy) Sampdoria	Undisclosed	From Milan Futuro, with obligation to buy	
1 September 2025	DF	(Spain) Álex Jiménez	20	(England) Bournemouth	€1,500,000	With conditional obligation to buy	
1 September 2025	MF	(United States) Yunus Musah	22	(Italy) Atalanta	€4,000,000	With option to buy	
1 September 2025	FW	(Nigeria) Samuel Chukwueze	26	(England) Fulham	Free	With option to buy	
5 September 2025	MF	(Algeria) Ismaël Bennacer	27	(Croatia) Dinamo Zagreb	Undisclosed	With option to buy	

Total income: ▲€181.8M
Balance: ▲€19.8M

=== Winter window ===
Deals officialised beforehand will be effective starting from 2 January 2026.

==== In ====
Date	Pos.	Player	Age	Moving from	Fee	Notes	Source
9 January 2026	MF	(Italy) Jacopo Sardo	20	(Italy) Monza	Undisclosed	Joined Milan Futuro	
2 February 2026	MF	(Italy) Alphadjo Cissè	19	(Italy) Hellas Verona	€8,000,000	Loaned back to Catanzaro right after purchase	

==== Loans in ====
Date	Pos.	Player	Age	Moving from	Fee	Notes	Source
2 January 2026	FW	(Germany) Niclas Füllkrug	32	(England) West Ham United	Free	With option to buy	
2 February 2026	DF	(Austria) Magnus Dalpiaz	18	(Germany) Bayern Munich	Undisclosed	Joined Milan Futuro, with option to buy	

Total spending: ▼€8M

==== Out ====
Date	Pos.	Player	Age	Moving to	Fee	Notes	Source
22 December 2025	FW	(Belgium) Divock Origi	30	Unattached	Free	From Milan Futuro, contract termination	
9 January 2026	DF	(Romania) Andrei Coubiș	22	(Italy) Sampdoria	€150,000	From loan to definitive purchase	
19 January 2026	DF	(Italy) Vittorio Magni	19	(Italy) Cesena	Undisclosed	From loan to definitive purchase	
23 January 2026	DF	(Romania) Matteo Duțu	20	(Romania) Dinamo București	Undisclosed	From Milan Futuro	

==== Loans out ====
Date	Pos.	Player	Age	Moving to	Fee	Notes	Source
7 January 2026	MF	(Italy) Kevin Zeroli	20	(Italy) Juve Stabia	Free	After early return from loan	
14 January 2026	MF	(Sweden) Maximilian Ibrahimović	19	(Netherlands) Ajax	Undisclosed	From Milan Futuro, with option to buy	
2 February 2026	MF	(Italy) Alphadjo Cissè	19	(Italy) Catanzaro	Free	Loaned right after purchase	
2 February 2026	FW	(Italy) Diego Sia	19	(Spain) Mirandés	Undisclosed	From Milan Futuro	
18 March 2026	MF	(Sweden) Demirel Hodžić	21	(Sweden) Örgryte IS	Undisclosed	From Milan Futuro	

Total income: ▲€0.15M
Balance: ▼€7.85M

== Pre-season and friendlies ==
Win Draw Loss Fixtures

19 July 2025 Friendly	Milan	3–0	Milan Futuro	Carnago
10:30 CEST (UTC+2)	Bartesaghi (??); Liberali (??); Gabbia (??)	Report		Stadium: Milanello

23 July 2025 Friendly	Arsenal	1–0 (5–6 p)	Milan	Kallang, Singapore
19:30 SGT (UTC+8)	Saka 53'	Report		Stadium: National Stadium; Attendance: 22,813; Referee: Jansen Foo (Singapore)
	Penalties
	Ødegaard (penalty missed); Zubimendi (penalty scored); Merino (penalty scored); Nelson (penalty missed); Kiwior (penalty missed); Dowman (penalty scored); Trossard (penalty scored); Nichols (penalty scored); Salmon (penalty missed)		(penalty scored) Gabbia; (penalty missed) Colombo; (penalty scored) Chukwueze; (penalty missed) Liberali; (penalty missed) Okafor; (penalty scored) Bondo; (penalty scored) F. Terracciano; (penalty scored) Duțu; (penalty scored) Comotto

26 July 2025 Standard Chartered Trophy	Liverpool	2–4	Milan	Hong Kong
19:30 HKT (UTC+8)	Szoboszlai 26'; Gakpo 90+3'	Report	Leão 10'; Loftus-Cheek 52'; Okafor 59', 90+4'	Stadium: Kai Tak Stadium; Attendance: 49,704; Referee: Tam Ping Wun (Hong Kong)

31 July 2025 Friendly	Perth Glory	0–9	Milan	Perth, Australia
18:20 AWST (UTC+8)		Report	F. Terracciano 3'; Okafor 23', 27'; Comotto 29' (pen.); Chukwueze 31'; Leão 46', 85'; Ricci 58'; Musah 80'	Stadium: HBF Park; Attendance: 19,226; Referee: Daniel Elder (Australia)

9 August 2025 Friendly	Leeds United	1–1	Milan	Dublin, Ireland
15:00 BST (UTC+1)	Stach (yellow card) 59', (goal) 67'	Report	Giménez 31'	Stadium: Aviva Stadium; Attendance: 51,711; Referee: Paul McLaughlin (Republic of Ireland)

10 August 2025 VisitMalta Weekender	Chelsea	4–1	Milan	London, England
15:00 BST (UTC+1)	Coubiș 5' (o.g.); João Pedro 8'; Delap 67' (pen.), 90'	Report	Coubiș (red card) 18'; Maignan (yellow card) 66'; Fofana 70'	Stadium: Stamford Bridge; Attendance: 37,000; Referee: Michael Salisbury (England)

== Competitions ==
=== Overall record ===
Competition	First match	Last match	Starting round	Final position	Record							
Competition	First match	Last match	Starting round	Final position	Pld	W	D	L	GF	GA	GD	Win %
Serie A	23 August 2025	24 May 2026	Matchday 1	5th	38	20	10	8	53	35	+18	52.63
Coppa Italia	17 August 2025	4 December 2025	First round	Round of 16	3	2	0	1	5	1	+4	66.67
Supercoppa Italiana	18 December 2025		Semi-finals	Semi-finals	1	0	0	1	0	2	−2	0.00
Total					42	22	10	10	58	38	+20	52.38

Source: Soccerway

=== Serie A ===
==== League table ====
Pos	Team	Pld	W	D	L	GF	GA	GD	Pts	Qualification or relegation
3	Roma	38	23	4	11	59	31	+28	73	Qualification for the UEFA Champions League league phase
4	Como	38	20	11	7	65	29	+36	71	Qualification for the UEFA Champions League league phase
5	AC Milan	38	20	10	8	53	35	+18	70	Qualification for the UEFA Europa League league phase (Note: Since the 2025–26 Coppa Italia winners, Inter Milan, qualified for the Champions League via league position, the Europa League spot awarded to the cup winners was passed to the sixth-placed team, and the Conference League spot was moved down one league position.)
6	Juventus	38	19	12	7	61	34	+27	69	Qualification for the UEFA Europa League league phase
7	Atalanta	38	15	14	9	51	36	+15	59	Qualification for the UEFA Conference League play-off round

Source: Serie A
Rules for classification: 1) Points; 2) Tiebreaker for Champions team and third relegated team; 3) Head-to-head points; 4) Head-to-head goal difference; 5) Goal difference; 6) Goals scored; 7) Draw.
(Note: Head-to-head record is used only after all the matches between the teams in question have been played)

==== Results summary ====
Overall								Home						Away					
Pld	W	D	L	GF	GA	GD	Pts	W	D	L	GF	GA	GD	W	D	L	GF	GA	GD
38	20	10	8	53	35	+18	70	9	5	5	25	21	+4	11	5	3	28	14	+14

Source: Serie A

==== Results by round ====
Round	1	2	3	4	5	6	7	8	9	10	11	12	13	14	15	17	18	19	20	16^{1}	21	22	23	25	24^{2}	26	27	28	29	30	31	32	33	34	35	36	37	38
Ground	H	A	H	A	H	A	H	H	A	H	A	A	H	A	H	H	A	H	A	A	H	A	A	A	H	H	A	H	A	H	A	H	A	H	A	H	A	H
Result	L	W	W	W	W	D	W	D	D	W	D	W	W	W	D	W	W	D	D	W	W	D	W	W	D	L	W	W	L	W	L	L	W	D	L	L	W	L
Position	15	8	5	3	1	3	1	3	4	3	3	2	1	1	2	2	2	2	2	2	2	2	2	2	2	2	2	2	2	2	3	3	2	3	3	4	3	5

Source: Serie A
A = Away; H = Home; W = Win; D = Draw; L = Loss; P = Postponed

^{1} Matchday 16 (vs Como) was postponed due to Milan's participation in the Supercoppa Italiana.
^{2} Matchday 24 (vs Como) was postponed due to scheduling conflicts with the 2026 Winter Olympics opening ceremony.

==== Matches ====
The league fixtures were released on 6 June 2025.

23 August 2025 1	Milan	1–2	Cremonese	Milan
20:45 CEST (UTC+2)	Pavlović 45+1'; Jiménez (yellow card) 78'	Report	Baschirotto 28'; Grassi (yellow card) 48'; Bonazzoli 61'; Terracciano (yellow card) 69'; Payero (yellow card) 77'; Bondo (yellow card) 88'	Stadium: San Siro; Attendance: 75,011; Referee: Giuseppe Collu

29 August 2025 2	Lecce	0–2	Milan	Lecce
20:45 CEST (UTC+2)	Gaspar (yellow card) 64'	Report	Loftus-Cheek 66'; Pulisic 86'	Stadium: Stadio Via del mare Attendance: 28,227; Referee: Livio Marinelli

14 September 2025 3	Milan	1–0	Bologna	Milan
20:45 CEST (UTC+2)	Estupiñán (yellow card) 10'; Tomori (yellow card) 18'; Saelemaekers (yellow card) 45+1'; Modrić 61'	Report	Miranda (yellow card) 73'; Skorupski (yellow card) 86'	Stadium: San Siro; Attendance: 69,593; Referee: Matteo Marcenaro

20 September 2025 4	Udinese	0–3	Milan	Udine
20:45 CEST (UTC+2)	Atta (yellow card) 30'; Zemura (yellow card) 50'	Report	Pulisic 40', 53'; Fofana 46'	Stadium: Stadio Friuli; Attendance: 24,201; Referee: Daniele Doveri

28 September 2025 5	Milan	2–1	Napoli	Milan
20:45 CEST (UTC+2)	Saelemaekers 3'; Pulisic 31'; Estupiñán (red card) 57'; Rabiot (yellow card) 90'	Report	De Bruyne 60' (pen.)	Stadium: San Siro; Attendance: 73,754; Referee: Daniele Chiffi

5 October 2025 6	Juventus	0–0	Milan	Turin
20:45 CEST (UTC+2)	Locatelli (yellow card) 49'; Gatti (yellow card) 74'	Report	Fofana (yellow card) 44'; Pulisic (penalty missed) 53'; Bartesaghi (yellow card) 59'	Stadium: Juventus Stadium; Attendance: 41,328; Referee: Marco Guida

19 October 2025 7	Milan	2–1	Fiorentina	Milan
20:45 CEST (UTC+2)	Athekame (yellow card) 50'; Fofana (yellow card) 60'; Leão 63', 86' (pen.); Tomori (yellow card) 74'	Report	Nicolussi Caviglia (yellow card) 54'; Gosens 55'; Parisi (yellow card) 85'; Ranieri (yellow card) 88'	Stadium: San Siro; Attendance: 71,475; Referee: Livio Marinelli

24 October 2025 8	Milan	2–2	Pisa	Milan
20:45 CEST (UTC+2)	Leão 7'; Athekame (yellow card) 81', (goal) 90+3'	Report	Aebischer (yellow card) 31'; Cuadrado 60' (pen.); Vural (yellow card) 84'; Nzola 86', (yellow card) 90+5'	Stadium: San Siro; Attendance: 72,615; Referee: Luca Zufferli

28 October 2025 9	Atalanta	1–1	Milan	Bergamo
20:45 CET (UTC+1)	Lookman 35'; Brescianini (yellow card) 90+3'	Report	Ricci 4'; Giménez (yellow card) 9'; Modrić (yellow card) 77'; Gabbia (yellow card) 90+3'	Stadium: Gewiss Stadium; Attendance: 23,157; Referee: Daniele Doveri

2 November 2025 10	Milan	1–0	Roma	Milan
20:45 CET (UTC+1)	Pavlović 39'; Fofana (yellow card) 78'	Report	El Aynaoui (yellow card) 34'; Wesley (yellow card) 74'; Çelik (yellow card) 75'; Dybala (penalty missed) 53'; Hermoso (yellow card) 83'; Mancini (yellow card) 90+5'	Stadium: San Siro; Attendance: 75,048; Referee: Marco Guida

8 November 2025 11	Parma	2–2	Milan	Parma
20:45 CET (UTC+1)	Bernabé 45+1'; Del Prato 61'; Sørensen (yellow card) 86'	Report	Saelemaekers 12'; Leão 25' (pen.); Modrić (yellow card) 69'	Stadium: Stadio Ennio Tardini; Attendance: 22,064; Referee: Marco Di Bello

23 November 2025 12	Internazionale	0–1	Milan	Milan
20:45 CET (UTC+1)	Çalhanoğlu (yellow card) 61', (penalty missed) 74'	Report	Leão (yellow card) 45+2'; Pulisic 54'; Pavlović (yellow card) 72'	Stadium: Stadio Giuseppe Meazza; Attendance: 75,562; Referee: Simone Sozza

29 November 2025 13	Milan	1–0	Lazio	Milan
20:45 CET (UTC+1)	Tomori (yellow card) 26'; Leão 51'; Gabbia (yellow card) 64'; Ricci (yellow card) 90'	Report	Pellegrini (yellow card) 57'; Romagnoli (yellow card) 72'; Zaccagni (yellow card) 90+13'	Stadium: San Siro; Attendance: 73,156; Referee: Giuseppe Collu

8 December 2025 14	Torino	2–3	Milan	Turin
20:45 CET (UTC+1)	Vlašić 10' (pen.); Zapata 17'; Lazaro (yellow card) 53'; Anjorin (yellow card) 56'	Report	Maignan (yellow card) 19'; Rabiot 24'; Pulisic 67', 77'	Stadium: Stadio Olimpico Grande Torino; Attendance: 25,000; Referee: Daniele Chiffi

14 December 2025 15	Milan	2–2	Sassuolo	Milan
12:30 CET (UTC+1)	Loftus-Cheek (yellow card) 23'; Bartesaghi 34', 47'	Report	Koné 13'; Fadera (yellow card) 23'; Muharemović (yellow card) 57'; Thorstvedt (yellow card) 66'; Laurienté 77'	Stadium: San Siro; Attendance: 73,446; Referee: Valerio Crezzini

28 December 2025 17	Milan	3–0	Hellas Verona	Milan
12:30 CET (UTC+1)	Pulisic 45+1'; Nkunku 48' (pen.), 53'	Report	Al-Musrati (yellow card) 43'	Stadium: San Siro; Attendance: 74,618; Referee: Michael Fabbri

2 January 2026 18	Cagliari	0–1	Milan	Cagliari
20:45 CET (UTC+1)	Idrissi (yellow card) 83'; Palestra (yellow card) 90+1'	Report	Leão 50'; Saelemaekers (yellow card) 90+1'	Stadium: Unipol Domus; Attendance: 16,412; Referee: Rosario Abisso

8 January 2026 19	Milan	1–1	Genoa	Milan
20:45 CET (UTC+1)	Gabbia (yellow card) 70'; Leão 90+2'; Maignan (yellow card) 90+7'; Pavlović (yellow card) 90+7'; Tomori (yellow card) 90+9'	Report	Colombo 28'; Leali (yellow card) 80'; Stanciu (penalty missed) 90+9'	Stadium: San Siro; Attendance: 69,397; Referee: Maurizio Mariani

11 January 2026 20	Fiorentina	1–1	Milan	Florence
15:00 CET (UTC+1)	Kean (yellow card) 31'; Comuzzo 66'; Fagioli (yellow card) 80'	Report	Estupiñán (yellow card) 53'; Rabiot (yellow card) 84'; Nkunku 90'; Fofana (yellow card) 90+4'	Stadium: Stadio Artemio Franchi; Attendance: 22,171; Referee: Davide Massa

15 January 2026 16	Como	1–3	Milan	Como
20:45 CET (UTC+1)	Kempf 10'; Ramón (yellow card) 90+1'	Report	Nkunku 45+1' (pen.); Rabiot 55', 88'	Stadium: Stadio Giuseppe Sinigaglia; Attendance: 11,667; Referee: Marco Guida
Note: The match was originally scheduled for 21 December 2025, but was postponed due to Milan's participation in the Supercoppa Italiana.

18 January 2026 21	Milan	1–0	Lecce	Milan
20:45 CET (UTC+1)	De Winter (yellow card) 21'; Füllkrug 76'	Report	Ramadani (yellow card) 84'	Stadium: San Siro; Attendance: 70,591; Referee: Luca Zufferli

25 January 2026 22	Roma	1–1	Milan	Rome
20:45 CET (UTC+1)	Pellegrini 74' (pen.)	Report	Rabiot (yellow card) 51'; Athekame (yellow card) 55'; De Winter 62'; Modrić (yellow card) 70'; Maignan (yellow card) 74'	Stadium: Stadio Olimpico; Attendance: 63,582; Referee: Andrea Colombo

3 February 2026 23	Bologna	0–3	Milan	Bologna
20:45 CET (UTC+1)	Ravaglia (yellow card) 51'; Freuler (yellow card) 58'; Ferguson (yellow card) 65'	Report	Loftus-Cheek 20'; Nkunku 39' (pen.); Rabiot 48'	Stadium: Stadio Renato Dall'Ara; Attendance: 30,932; Referee: Gianluca Manganiello

13 February 2026 25	Pisa	1–2	Milan	Pisa
20:45 CET (UTC+1)	Touré (yellow card) 16'; Loyola 71'	Report	Loftus-Cheek 39'; Füllkrug (penalty missed) 56'; Modrić 85'; Bartesaghi (yellow card) 88'; Rabiot (yellow card) 90+1' (yellow-red card) 90+1'	Stadium: Stadio Romeo Anconetani; Attendance: 12,544; Referee: Michael Fabbri

18 February 2026 24	Milan	1–1	Como	Milan
20:45 CET (UTC+1)	Leão 64', (yellow card) 68'; Saelemaekers (yellow card) 87'	Report	Paz 32', (yellow card) 53'; Butez (yellow card) 63'; Roberto (yellow card) 68'	Stadium: San Siro; Attendance: 75,251; Referee: Maurizio Mariani
Note: The match was originally scheduled for 8 February 2026, but was postponed due to scheduling conflicts with the 2026 Winter Olympics opening ceremony.

22 February 2026 26	Milan	0–1	Parma	Milan
18:00 CET (UTC+1)	Saelemaekers (yellow card) 32'; Leão (yellow card) 52'	Report	Troilo (yellow card) 48', (goal) 80'	Stadium: San Siro; Attendance: 73,017; Referee: Marco Piccinini

1 March 2026 27	Cremonese	0–2	Milan	Cremona
12:30 CET (UTC+1)	Terracciano (yellow card) 76'; Maleh (yellow card) 85'	Report	Pavlović 90'; Leão 90+4'	Stadium: Stadio Giovanni Zini; Attendance: 14,711; Referee: Davide Massa

8 March 2026 28	Milan	1–0	Internazionale	Milan
20:45 CET (UTC+1)	Estupiñán 35'; Rabiot (yellow card) 80'; Modrić (yellow card) 89'	Report	Bastoni (yellow card) 65'; Dumfries (yellow card) 69'	Stadium: San Siro; Attendance: 75,627; Referee: Daniele Doveri

15 March 2026 29	Lazio	1–0	Milan	Rome
20:45 CET (UTC+1)	Isaksen 26'; Motta (yellow card) 70'; Tavares (yellow card) 81'; Pedro (yellow card) 90+4'; Patric (yellow card) 90+5'	Report	Estupiñán (yellow card) 55'	Stadium: Stadio Olimpico; Attendance: 50,000; Referee: Marco Guida

21 March 2026 30	Milan	3–2	Torino	Milan
18:00 CET (UTC+1)	Tomori (yellow card) 9'; Pavlović 37', (yellow card) 82'; Rabiot 54'; Fofana 56'; Giménez (yellow card) 90+6'	Report	Simeone 44'; Vlašić 83' (pen.); İlkhan (yellow card) 90+3'	Stadium: San Siro; Attendance: 73,043; Referee: Francesco Fourneau

6 April 2026 31	Napoli	1–0	Milan	Naples
20:45 CEST (UTC+2)	Buongiorno (yellow card) 12'; Politano 79', (yellow card) 82'	Report		Stadium: Stadio Diego Armando Maradona; Attendance: 50,000; Referee: Daniele Doveri

11 April 2026 32	Milan	0–3	Udinese	Milan
18:00 CEST (UTC+2)	Leão (yellow card) 16'	Report	Bartesaghi 27' (o.g.); Ekkelenkamp 37'; Kristensen (yellow card) 46'; Atta 71'	Stadium: San Siro; Attendance: 74,675; Referee: Matteo Marchetti

19 April 2026 33	Hellas Verona	0–1	Milan	Verona
15:00 CEST (UTC+2)	Akpa Akpro (yellow card) 24'; Al-Musrati (yellow card) 84'	Report	Rabiot 41'	Stadium: Stadio Marcantonio Bentegodi; Attendance: 21,338; Referee: Daniele Chiffi

26 April 2026 34	Milan	0–0	Juventus	Milan
20:45 CEST (UTC+2)	Bartesaghi (yellow card) 38'; Estupiñán (yellow card) 75'	Report	Cambiaso (yellow card) 21'; Boga (yellow card) 72'; Locatelli (yellow card) 86'	Stadium: San Siro; Attendance: 75,681; Referee: Simone Sozza

3 May 2026 35	Sassuolo	2–0	Milan	Reggio Emilia
15:00 CEST (UTC+2)	Berardi 5'; Matić (yellow card) 38'; Laurienté 47'; Garcia (yellow card) 57'; Volpato (yellow card) 89'; Fadera (yellow card) 90+4'	Report	Tomori (yellow card) 9' (yellow-red card) 24'; Ricci (yellow card) 71'; Loftus-Cheek (yellow card) 77'	Stadium: Mapei Stadium – Città del Tricolore; Attendance: 19,361; Referee: Fabio Maresca

10 May 2026 36	Milan	2–3	Atalanta	Milan
20:45 CEST (UTC+2)	Leão (yellow card) 34'; Pavlović 88'; Estupiñán (yellow card) 89'; Saelemaekers (yellow card) 90'; Nkunku 90+4' (pen.)	Report	Éderson 7'; Zappacosta 29'; Raspadori 51'; Hien (yellow card) 70'; Krstović (yellow card) 90+5'; Bellanova (yellow card) 90+6'	Stadium: San Siro; Attendance: 73,498; Referee: Luca Zufferli

17 May 2026 37	Genoa	1–2	Milan	Genoa
12:00 CEST (UTC+2)	Bijlow (yellow card) 49'; Vitinha (yellow card) 64'; Vásquez 87'	Report	Nkunku 51' (pen.); Gabbia (yellow card) 63'; Tomori (yellow card) 71'; Athekame 81'; Ricci (yellow card) 86'	Stadium: Stadio Luigi Ferraris; Attendance: 31,302; Referee: Simone Sozza

24 May 2026 38	Milan	1–2	Cagliari	Milan
20:45 CEST (UTC+2)	Saelemaekers 2'; Pavlović (yellow card) 56'; Maignan (yellow card) 58'	Report	Zé Pedro (yellow card) 2'; Borrelli 20'; Rodríguez 57'; Sulemana (yellow card) 90+6'	Stadium: San Siro; Attendance: 74,593; Referee: Marco Guida

=== Coppa Italia ===
17 August 2025 First round	Milan	2–0	Bari	Milan
21:15 CEST (UTC+2)	Leão 14'; Estupiñán (yellow card) 21'; Pulisic 48'	Report		Stadium: San Siro; Attendance: 71,061; Referee: Alberto Arena

23 September 2025 Second round	Milan	3–0	Lecce	Milan
21:00 CEST (UTC+2)	Giménez 20'; Ricci (yellow card) 35'; Nkunku 51'; Pulisic 64'; Pavlović (yellow card) 70'	Report	Siebert (red card) 18'; Kaba (yellow card) 43'	Stadium: San Siro; Attendance: 54,418; Referee: Paride Tremolada

4 December 2025 Round of 16	Lazio	1–0	Milan	Rome
21:00 CET (UTC+1)	Zaccagni 80'	Report	Pavlović (yellow card) 2'; De Winter (yellow card) 84'	Stadium: Stadio Olimpico; Attendance: 41,718; Referee: Marco Guida

=== Supercoppa Italiana ===
18 December 2025 Semi-finals	Napoli	2–0	Milan	Riyadh, Saudi Arabia
22:00 SAST (UTC+3)	Neres 39'; Højlund 64'; Spinazzola (yellow card) 81'; McTominay (yellow card) 83'	Report	Rabiot (yellow card) 38'; Tomori (yellow card) 83'; Athekame (yellow card) 85'	Stadium: King Saud University Stadium; Attendance: 24,941; Referee: Luca Zufferli

== Statistics ==
=== Appearances and goals ===
No.	Pos	Nat	Player	Total		Serie A		Coppa Italia		Supercoppa Italiana	
No.	Pos	Nat	Player	Apps	Goals	Apps	Goals	Apps	Goals	Apps	Goals
Goalkeepers
1	GK	(Italy) ITA	Pietro Terracciano	2	0	1+1	0	0	0	0	0
16	GK	(France) FRA	Mike Maignan	41	0	37	0	3	0	1	0
96	GK	(Italy) ITA	Lorenzo Torriani	0	0	0	0	0	0	0	0
Defenders
2	DF	(Ecuador) ECU	Pervis Estupiñán	22	1	13+6	1	2	0	1	0
5	DF	(Belgium) BEL	Koni De Winter	29	1	19+7	1	2	0	1	0
23	DF	(England) ENG	Fikayo Tomori	37	0	31+2	0	3	0	1	0
24	DF	(Switzerland) SUI	Zachary Athekame	29	2	7+20	2	0+1	0	0+1	0
27	DF	(Germany) GER	David Odogu	3	0	0+2	0	0+1	0	0	0
31	DF	(Serbia) SRB	Strahinja Pavlović	38	5	33+1	5	3	0	1	0
33	DF	(Italy) ITA	Davide Bartesaghi	33	2	27+4	2	1+1	0	0	0
46	DF	(Italy) ITA	Matteo Gabbia	31	0	28+2	0	1	0	0	0
Midfielders
4	MF	(Italy) ITA	Samuele Ricci	34	1	11+20	1	3	0	0	0
8	MF	(England) ENG	Ruben Loftus-Cheek	32	3	12+16	3	3	0	1	0
11	MF	(United States) USA	Christian Pulisic	34	10	18+12	8	1+2	2	1	0
12	MF	(France) FRA	Adrien Rabiot	32	6	28+1	6	2	0	1	0
14	MF	(Croatia) CRO	Luka Modrić	37	2	32+2	2	0+2	0	0+1	0
19	MF	(France) FRA	Youssouf Fofana	36	2	28+5	2	1+1	0	0+1	0
30	MF	(Switzerland) SUI	Ardon Jashari	16	0	7+6	0	1+1	0	1	0
56	MF	(Belgium) BEL	Alexis Saelemaekers	39	3	33+2	3	3	0	1	0
Forwards
7	FW	(Mexico) MEX	Santiago Giménez	18	1	11+5	0	1+1	1	0	0
9	FW	(Germany) GER	Niclas Füllkrug	20	1	3+17	1	0	0	0	0
10	FW	(Portugal) POR	Rafael Leão	31	10	23+6	9	2	1	0	0
18	FW	(France) FRA	Christopher Nkunku	34	8	15+16	7	1+1	1	1	0
25	FW	(Suriname) SUR	Cheveyo Balentien	3	0	0+2	0	0+1	0	0	0
Players transferred out during the season
17	FW	(Switzerland) SUI	Noah Okafor	1	0	0	0	0+1	0	0	0
20	DF	(Spain) ESP	Álex Jiménez	1	0	0+1	0	0	0	0	0
21	FW	(Nigeria) NGR	Samuel Chukwueze	1	0	0+1	0	0	0	0	0
80	MF	(United States) USA	Yunus Musah	2	0	1	0	0+1	0	0	0

Source: Competitions

=== Goalscorers ===
Players in italics left the team during the season.

Rank	No.	Pos.	Nat.	Player	Serie A	Coppa Italia	Supercoppa Italiana	Total
1	11	MF	(United States)	Christian Pulisic	8	2	0	10
1	10	FW	(Portugal)	Rafael Leão	9	1	0	10
3	18	FW	(France)	Christopher Nkunku	7	1	0	8
4	12	MF	(France)	Adrien Rabiot	6	0	0	6
5	31	DF	(Serbia)	Strahinja Pavlović	5	0	0	5
6	8	MF	(England)	Ruben Loftus-Cheek	3	0	0	3
6	56	MF	(Belgium)	Alexis Saelemaekers	3	0	0	3
8	14	MF	(Croatia)	Luka Modrić	2	0	0	2
8	24	DF	(Switzerland)	Zachary Athekame	2	0	0	2
8	29	MF	(France)	Youssouf Fofana	2	0	0	2
8	33	DF	(Italy)	Davide Bartesaghi	2	0	0	2
12	4	MF	(Italy)	Samuele Ricci	1	0	0	1
12	5	DF	(Belgium)	Koni De Winter	1	0	0	1
12	7	FW	(Mexico)	Santiago Gimenez	0	1	0	1
12	9	FW	(Germany)	Niclas Füllkrug	1	0	0	1
12	2	DF	(Ecuador)	Pervis Estupiñán	1	0	0	1
Own goals					0	0	0	0
Totals					54	5	0	59

=== Assists ===
Players in italics left the team during the season.

Rank	No.	Pos.	Nat.	Player	Serie A	Coppa Italia	Supercoppa Italiana	Total
1	19	MF	(France)	Youssouf Fofana	4	1	0	5
1	11	MF	(United States)	Christian Pulisic	5	0	0	5
3	4	MF	(Italy)	Samuele Ricci	4	0	0	4
3	56	MF	(Belgium)	Alexis Saelemaekers	3	1	0	4
3	12	MF	(France)	Adrien Rabiot	4	0	0	4
6	23	DF	(England)	Fikayo Tomori	2	1	0	3
6	14	MF	(Croatia)	Luka Modric	3	0	0	3
6	10	FW	(Portugal)	Rafael Leão	3	0	0	3
6	18	FW	(France)	Christopher Nkunku	3	0	0	3
10	24	DF	(Switzerland)	Zachary Athekame	2	0	0	2
10	7	FW	(Mexico)	Santiago Giménez	1	1	0	2
12	2	DF	(Ecuador)	Pervis Estupiñán	1	0	0	1
12	33	DF	(Italy)	Davide Bartesaghi	0	1	0	1
12	31	DF	(Serbia)	Strahinja Pavlović	1	0	0	1
12	8	MF	(England)	Ruben Loftus-Cheek	1	0	0	1
12	30	MF	(Switzerland)	Ardon Jashari	1	0	0	1
12	5	DF	(Belgium)	Koni De Winter	1	0	0	1
Totals					39	5	0	44

=== Clean sheets ===
Rank	No.	Pos.	Nat.	Player	Serie A	Coppa Italia	Supercoppa Italiana	Total
1	16	GK	(France)	Mike Maignan	13	1	0	14
2	1	GK	(Italy)	Pietro Terracciano	1	1	0	2
3	N.A.	GK	N.A.	Shared	1	0	0	1
Totals					15	2	0	17

=== Disciplinary record ===
Players in italics left the team during the season.

No.	Pos.	Nat.	Player	Serie A			Coppa Italia			Supercoppa Italiana			Total		
No.	Pos.	Nat.	Player	Yellow card	(yellow card) (yellow-red card)	Red card	Yellow card	(yellow card) (yellow-red card)	Red card	Yellow card	(yellow card) (yellow-red card)	Red card	Yellow card	(yellow card) (yellow-red card)	Red card
2	DF	(Ecuador)	Pervis Estupiñán	5		1	1						6		1
4	MF	(Italy)	Samuele Ricci	3									3		
5	DF	(Belgium)	Koni De Winter	1			1						2		
7	FW	(Mexico)	Santiago Giménez	2									2		
8	MF	(England)	Ruben Loftus-Cheek	2									2		
10	FW	(Portugal)	Rafael Leão	5									5		
12	MF	(France)	Adrien Rabiot	5	1					1			6	1	
14	MF	(Croatia)	Luka Modrić	4									4		
16	GK	(France)	Mike Maignan	4									4		
19	MF	(France)	Youssouf Fofana	4									4		
20	DF	(Spain)	Álex Jiménez	1									1		
23	DF	(England)	Fikayo Tomori	6	1					1			7	1	
24	DF	(Switzerland)	Zachary Athekame	3						1			4		
31	DF	(Serbia)	Strahinja Pavlović	4			1						5		
33	DF	(Italy)	Davide Bartesaghi	3									3		
46	DF	(Italy)	Matteo Gabbia	4									4		
56	MF	(Belgium)	Alexis Saelemaekers	5									5		
Totals				61	2	1	3	0	0	3	0	0	67	2	1
