= José Ángel Moreno =

Spanish football manager (born 1953)

Moreno
Personal information
- Full name: José Ángel Moreno
- Date of birth: 19 September 1953 (age 73)
- Place of birth: Seville, Spain

Managerial career
- Years: Team
- 1978–1979: Carolinense
- 1980–1983: Betis (youth)
- 1983–1984: Betis B
- 1986: Betis B
- 1986–1988: Palma del Río
- 1988–1994: Sevilla B
- 1994–1995: Xerez
- 1997: Sevilla B
- 1997–1998: Almería
- 1998–1999: Écija
- 1999–2001: Poli Almería
- 2001: Granada
- 2001–2002: Algeciras
- 2003–2006: Levante B
- 2008: Levante
- 2011: Ceuta

José Ángel Moreno (born 19 September 1953), simply known as Moreno, is a Spanish former football manager.

== Managerial career ==
Born in Seville, Andalusia, Moreno began his managerial career with Carolinense CD in the Tercera División. He was later in charge of Real Betis' youth setup, being also manager of the reserves. In 1988, he was appointed Sevilla Atlético manager, remaining in charge for six seasons.

Moreno subsequently managed clubs in Segunda División B, coaching Xerez CD, UD Almería, Écija Balompié, Polideportivo Almería, Granada CF and Algeciras CF. In 2003, he was named manager of another reserve team, Levante UD B in Tercera División.

In 2006, after taking the Valencians to the third level, Moreno was appointed director of the youth setup. On 16 April 2008, he was appointed at the helm of the main squad in La Liga, replacing Gianni De Biasi.

After achieving a 3–1 home win against Getafe CF (and being the first manager of the club's history to do so in his first match in charge in the category), Moreno only obtained one point out of 15, and his side was eventually relegated as last place. He subsequently returned to his previous role, and left the Granotes on 10 July 2009.

On 20 April 2011, Moreno was named AD Ceuta manager until the end of the season. He only remained in charge for the last four matches, and eventually left the club.
