= Matteo Duțu =

Romanian footballer (born 2005)

Personal information
- Date of birth: 23 November 2005 (age 20)
- Place of birth: Rome, Italy
- Height: 1.92 m (6 ft 4 in)
- Position: Centre-back

Team information
- Current team: Dinamo București
- Number: 30

Youth career
- 2011–2024: Lazio
- 2024–2025: AC Milan

Senior career*
Years	Team	Apps	(Gls)
2023–2024	Lazio	0	(0)
2024–2026	Milan Futuro	19	(1)
2025–2026	AC Milan	0	(0)
2026–	Dinamo București	11	(0)

International career^{‡}
2021–2022	Romania U17	7	(0)
2022–2023	Romania U18	9	(0)
2023	Romania U19	4	(0)
2024	Romania U20	5	(0)
2025–2026	Romania U21	14	(0)
- * Club domestic league appearances and goals as of 25 October 2026 ‡ National team caps and goals as of 6 October 2026

Matteo Duțu (born 23 November 2005) is a professional footballer who plays as a centre-back for Liga I club Dinamo București. Born in Italy, he is a Romania youth international.

== Club career ==
=== Lazio ===
Duțu began his career in 2011, progressing through the youth ranks of Serie A club Lazio. During the 2023–24 season, on 13 December 2023, he received his first call-up with the senior team for a 2–0 away loss UEFA Champions League group stage match against Spanish La Liga club Atlético Madrid, as an unused substitute.

=== AC Milan ===
On 12 July 2024, Duțu moved to fellow Serie A club AC Milan for an estimated €200,000 and joining the under-19 team. He was first called-up with the newly created reserve team Milan Futuro on 10 August 2024, for a 3–0 away win Coppa Italia Serie C match against Lecco, but didn't play. A couple months later he made his professional debut with Milan Futuro on 20 October 2024, substituting Davide Bartesaghi at the 80th minute of a 3–1 home loss Serie C match against Legnago.

Duțu was one of the players that were called up by AC Milan head coach Massimiliano Allegri, for the 2025 AC Milan Asia-Pacific Tour pre-season matches against English Premier League clubs Arsenal and Liverpool, as well as Australian A-League Men club Perth Glory on 23, 26 and 31 July 2025, respectively.

He became Milan Futuro's captain ahead of the 2025–26 season.

Duțu received his first call-up with AC Milan for the 2–0 loss 2025–26 Supercoppa Italiana match against Napoli on 18 December 2025, as an unused substitute however.

=== Dinamo București ===
On 23 January 2026, he moved to Romania and joined Liga I club Dinamo București, permanently for an undisclosed fee.

== International career ==
Born in Rome, Italy, Duțu is eligible to represent Italy and Romania internationally. He has represented Romania at the youth level, having featured with the U17, U18, U19, U20 and U21 teams.

== Career statistics ==
As of match played 28 October 2026

Appearances and goals by club, season and competition
Club	Season	League			National cup (Note: Includes Coppa Italia Serie D, Cupa României)		Europe		Other		Total	
Club	Season	Division	Apps	Goals	Apps	Goals	Apps	Goals	Apps	Goals	Apps	Goals
Lazio	2023–24	Serie A	0	0	0	0	0	0	0	0	0	0
Milan Futuro	2024–25	Serie C	1	0	0	0	—		0	0	1	0
Milan Futuro	2025–26	Serie D	18	1	2	1	—		0	0	20	2
Milan Futuro	Total		19	1	2	1	—		0	0	21	2
AC Milan	2025–26	Serie A	0	0	0	0	0	0	0	0	0	0
Dinamo București	2025–26	Liga I	8	0	3	0	—		1 (Note: Appearances in Liga I European play-offs)	0	12	0
Dinamo București	2026–27	Liga I	3	0	2	0	—		—		5	0
Dinamo București	Total		11	0	5	0	—		1	0	17	0
Career total			30	1	7	1	0	0	1	0	38	2

== Personal life ==
He is the younger brother of fellow professional footballer Eduard Duțu, who progressed through the youth ranks of Fiorentina, and also plays as a centre-back as well, for Liga II club Bihor Oradea.
