= Vittorio Magni (footballer) =

Italian footballer (born 2006)

Personal information
- Date of birth: 1 June 2006 (age 20)
- Place of birth: Milan, Italy
- Height: 1.83 m (6 ft 0 in)
- Position: Full-back

Team information
- Current team: Cesena
- Number: 23

Youth career
- Lombardia Uno
- –2025: AC Milan

Senior career*
Years	Team	Apps	(Gls)
2024–2025	Milan Futuro (res.)	16	(0)
2025–2026	AC Milan	0	(0)
2025–2026	→ Cesena (loan)	7	(0)
2026–	Cesena	10	(0)

International career^{‡}
2022–2023	Italy U17	8	(0)
2024	Italy U18	1	(0)
2023–2025	Italy U19	17	(0)
2025–	Italy U20	2	(0)
- * Club domestic league appearances and goals as of 27 October 2026 ‡ National team caps and goals as of 23:45, 9 September 2025 (UTC)

Vittorio Magni (born 1 June 2006) is an Italian professional footballer who plays as a full-back for Serie B club Cesena.

== Club career ==
=== Youth career ===
A youth product of Lombardia Uno, Magni moved to the youth academy of AC Milan, where he progressed ans finished his development.

=== Milan Futuro ===
He was first called-up with the newly created reserve team Milan Futuro on 25 August 2024, for a 1–0 away loss Serie C match against Virtus Entella, but didn't play. He made his professional debut with Milan Futuro on 14 September 2024, during a 2–0 home loss Serie C match against Ascoli.

On 19 July 2025, during the 2025–26 pre-season, Magni was called-up with the senior squad for the first time by head coach Massimiliano Allegri.

==== Loan to Cesena ====
On 15 August 2025, he joined Serie B club Cesena on an initial loan for the 2025–26 season, with the option to make the move permanent once the season concludes.

=== Cesena ===
On 19 January 2026, Magni permanently joined Cesena, signing a contract until 2030.

== International career ==
Magni has represented Italy at under-17, under-18, under-19, and under-20 levels.

== Career statistics ==
As of match played 17 January 2026

Appearances and goals by club, season and competition
Club	Season	League			Cup (Note: Includes Coppa Italia Serie C)		Continental		Other		Total	
Club	Season	Division	Apps	Goals	Apps	Goals	Apps	Goals	Apps	Goals	Apps	Goals
Milan Futuro	2024–25	Serie C	16	0	1	0	—		—		17	0
Milan Futuro	Total		16	0	—		—		—		16	0
Cesena (loan)	2025–26	Serie B	7	0	0	0	—		0	0	7	0
Cesena (loan)	Total		7	0	0	0	—		0	0	7	0
Career total			23	0	1	0	0	0	0	0	24	0
