= Nico Guillén =

Spanish footballer (born 2008)

Personal information
- Full name: Nicolás Guillén Peguero
- Date of birth: 30 January 2008 (age 18)
- Place of birth: Huelva, Spain
- Height: 1.85 m (6 ft 1 in)
- Position: Midfielder

Team information
- Current team: Sevilla
- Number: 27

Youth career
- 2021–2025: Sevilla

Senior career*
Years	Team	Apps	(Gls)
2024–	Sevilla B	34	(2)
2026–	Sevilla	0	(0)

International career^{‡}
2024	Spain U16	4	(0)
2024–	Spain U17	14	(0)
2025–	Spain U18	3	(1)
- * Club domestic league appearances and goals as of 6 June 2026 ‡ National team caps and goals as of 14 October 2025

Nicolás Guillén Peguero (born 30 January 2008), known as Nico Guillén, is a Spanish professional footballer who plays as a midfielder for La Liga club Sevilla.

== Early life ==
Guillén was born on 30 January 2008. Born in Spain, he is a native of Huelva, Spain.

== Club career ==
As a youth player, Guillén joined the youth academy of La Liga side Sevilla. In 2024, he was promoted to the club's reserve team.

== International career ==
Guillén is a Spain youth international. During February 2025, he played for the at the Torneio Internacional Algarve U17.

== Style of play ==
Guillén plays as a midfielder and is left-footed. English newspaper The Guardian wrote in 2025 that he "is a versatile midfielder stylistically similar to Fernando Redondo".
