= CD Imperio de Albolote =

Spanish football team

Imperio de Albolote
- Full name: Club Deportivo Imperio de Albolote
- Founded: 1931
- Dissolved: 2012
- Ground: Estadio Municipal, Albolote, Spain
- Capacity: 2,500
- 2011–12: Regional Preferente, 11th of 18
Home colours	Away colours

Club Deportivo Imperio de Albolote was a football team based in Albolote. Founded in 1931 and dissolved in 2012, the team played in Regional Preferente. The club's home ground is Estadio Municipal de Albolote.

Shortly after the club's dissolution, a new club named Albolote CF was founded in the city, but was dissolved in 2020 and CF Imperio de Albolote took its place.

== Season to season ==
Season	Tier	Division	Place	Copa del Rey
1982–83	7	2ª Reg.	4th	
1983–84	6	1ª Reg.	4th	
1984–85	6	1ª Reg.	8th	
1985–86	6	1ª Reg.	2nd	
1986–87	5	Reg. Pref.	13th	
1987–88	5	Reg. Pref.	9th	
1988–89	5	Reg. Pref.	14th	
1989–90	5	Reg. Pref.	13th	
1990–91	5	Reg. Pref.	7th	
1991–92	5	Reg. Pref.	8th	
1992–93	5	Reg. Pref.	4th	
1993–94	5	Reg. Pref.	1st	
1994–95	5	Reg. Pref.	3rd	
1995–96	5	Reg. Pref.	4th	
1996–97	5	Reg. Pref.	5th	

Season	Tier	Division	Place	Copa del Rey
1997–98	5	Reg. Pref.	2nd	
1998–99	4	3ª	22nd	
1999–2000	5	Reg. Pref.	1st	
2000–01	4	3ª	18th	
2001–02	5	Reg. Pref.	1st	
2002–03	5	Reg. Pref.	5th	
2003–04	5	Reg. Pref.	2nd	
2004–05	4	3ª	14th	
2005–06	4	3ª	10th	
2006–07	4	3ª	19th	
2007–08	5	1ª And.	2nd	
2008–09	4	3ª	19th	
2009–10	5	1ª And.	16th	
2010–11	6	Reg. Pref.	4th	
2011–12	6	Reg. Pref.	11th	

- 6 seasons in Tercera División

== Notable players ==
- (Spain) Manuel Lucena
