= Miguel Sierra (footballer) =

Spanish footballer (born 2004)

Personal information
- Full name: Miguel Ángel Sierra Ortega
- Date of birth: 14 July 2004 (age 22)
- Place of birth: Granada, Spain
- Height: 1.81 m (5 ft 11 in)
- Position: Winger

Team information
- Current team: Sevilla
- Number: 30

Youth career
- 2014–2019: Chana Barrio
- 2019–2022: Reino Granada
- 2022–2023: Granada

Senior career*
| Years | Team | Apps | (Gls) |
| 2023 | Cubillas Albolote | 2 | (0) |
| 2023–2024 | Avilés Industrial | 24 | (0) |
| 2024– | Sevilla B | 53 | (2) |
| 2025– | Sevilla | 4 | (0) |
- * Club domestic league appearances and goals as of 10 June 2026 ‡ National team caps and goals as of 21:18, 28 November 2025 (UTC)

Miguel Ángel Sierra Ortega (born 14 July 2004) is a Spanish professional footballer who plays as a left winger for Sevilla FC.

== Career ==
Born in Granada, Andalusia, Sierra joined Granada CF's youth sides in January 2022, after representing CF Reino de Granada and UD Estrellas Chana Barrio. He made his senior debut with the former's affiliate side FC Cubillas de Albolote in the División de Honor Andaluza in March 2023, but joined Segunda Federación side Real Avilés Industrial CF on 10 July of that year, after finishing his formation.

On 7 August 2024, Sierra signed a two-year contract with Sevilla FC, being initially assigned to the reserves in Primera Federación. On 5 September 2024, he was called up to the first team by manager García Pimienta for a period of trainings, as several players were out on international duty.

After establishing himself as a first-choice with the B's, Sierra made his professional – and La Liga – debut on 30 November 2025, coming on as a late substitute for Chidera Ejuke in a 2–0 home loss to rivals Real Betis.

He scored his first goal as a professional player against Atlético de Madrid while playing for Sevilla FC, in a 1-3 defeat.
