= Fran González (footballer, born 2005) =

Spanish footballer

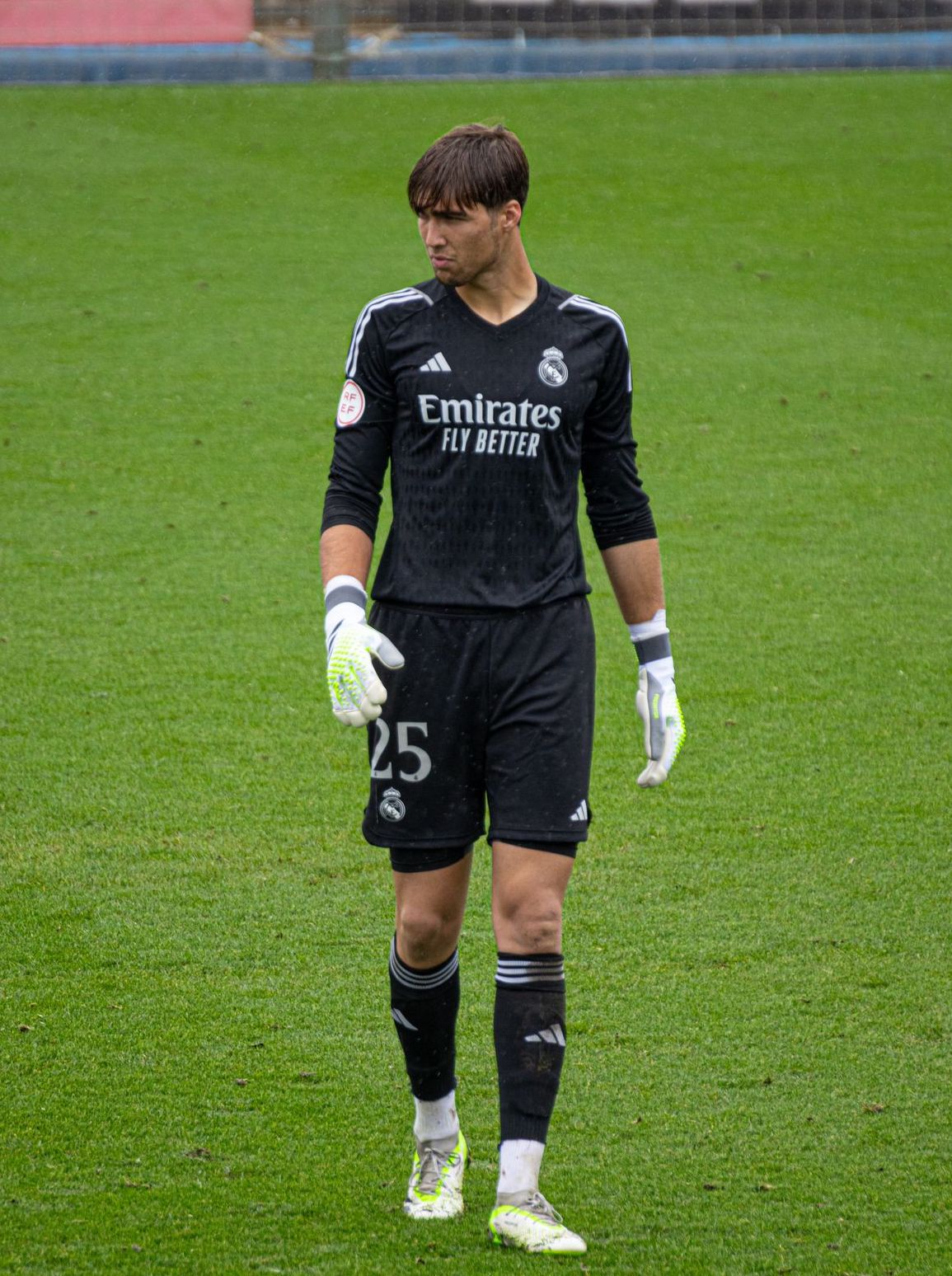
- González with Real Madrid C in 2023

Personal information
- Full name: Francisco Javier González Pérez
- Date of birth: 24 June 2005 (age 21)
- Place of birth: León, Spain
- Height: 1.99 m (6 ft 6 in)
- Position: Goalkeeper

Team information
- Current team: Sevilla
- Number: 13

Youth career
- 2010–2022: Cultural Leonesa
- 2022–2024: Real Madrid

Senior career*
Years	Team	Apps	(Gls)
2023–2024	Real Madrid C	22	(0)
2024–2026	Real Madrid B	46	(0)
2025–2026	Real Madrid	1	(0)
2026–	Sevilla	0	(0)

International career^{‡}
2023–2024	Spain U19	6	(0)
2025	Spain U20	5	(0)
2025–	Spain U21	3	(0)
Medal record
Men's football
Representing Spain
UEFA European Under-19 Championship
Winner	2024 Northern Ireland
- * Club domestic league appearances and goals as of 31 May 2026 ‡ National team caps and goals as of 31 March 2026

Francisco Javier González Pérez (born 24 June 2005) is a Spanish footballer who plays as a goalkeeper for La Liga club Sevilla.

== Early life and club career ==
González was born on 24 June 2005 in León. From his beginnings in football at the early age of five, Fran González has been forged in the youth categories of Cultural Leonesa, where he showed an outstanding talent as a goalkeeper. For 12 seasons, he passionately defended the Leonesa colours.

=== Real Madrid ===
In 2022, González joined Real Madrid after a season in the National League with the Cultural Leonesa's Juvenil B team. His performance in Real Madrid Juvenil B drew attention, particularly under the watchful eye of Luis Llopis, the goalkeeping coach of the first team under the management of Carlo Ancelotti.

In July 2023, González was called up for the preseason of Real Madrid's first team in the United States, marking a milestone in his career. His five-year contract extension with Real Madrid solidified his position and made him one of the four goalkeepers for the 2023/24 season.

Fran González joined the Real Madrid Juvenil A, alternating between matches with the Real Madrid C team in the Tercera Federación. Despite not being part of the first team's squad, his youth did not hinder him from being a starter in the Tercera Federación in a 0–1 victory in Las Rozas. He also traveled with the first team on their United States tour and was registered for the Champions League.

González made his LaLiga debut on 4 April 2025 against Valencia, making him the youngest goalkeeper to debut for Real Madrid since Iker Casillas in 2000. The game ended in a 1–2 loss.

=== Sevilla ===
On 2 August 2026, González joined Sevilla, signing a contract until 2031.

== International career ==
González is a Spain youth international, has been called up to represent the Spain U19. He got called up for 2024 UEFA European Under-19 Championship held in Northern Ireland and was an unused substitute throughout the tournament, which Spain won after defeating France U19 2–1 in the final.

== Style of playing ==
González is known for his reflexes, agility and shot-stopping.

== Personal life ==
González has regarded Spain international Iker Casillas as his footballing idol.

== Career statistics ==
=== Club ===
As of match played 29 October 2026

Appearances and goals by club, season and competition
Club	Season	League			Cup		Europe		Other		Total	
Club	Season	Division	Apps	Goals	Apps	Goals	Apps	Goals	Apps	Goals	Apps	Goals
Real Madrid C	2023–24	Tercera Federación	22	0	—		—		—		22	0
Real Madrid Castilla	2023–24	Primera Federación	1	0	—		—		—		1	0
Real Madrid Castilla	2024–25	Primera Federación	19	0	—		—		—		19	0
Real Madrid Castilla	2025–26	Primera Federación	26	0	—		—		—		26	0
Real Madrid Castilla	Total		46	0	—		—		—		46	0
Real Madrid	2024–25	La Liga	1	0	0	0	0	0	0	0	1	0
Sevilla	2026–27	La Liga	0	0	1	0	—		—		1	0
Career total			69	0	1	0	0	0	0	0	70	0

== Honours ==
Real Madrid

- UEFA Champions League: 2023–24
- UEFA Super Cup: 2024
- FIFA Intercontinental Cup: 2024

Spain U19

- UEFA European Under-19 Championship: 2024
