= Ibrahima Sow =

Senegalese footballer (born 2007)

Personal information
- Date of birth: 26 January 2007 (age 19)
- Place of birth: Dakar, Senegal
- Height: 1.84 m (6 ft 0 in)
- Position: Striker

Team information
- Current team: Sevilla B
- Number: 23

Youth career
- Torre del Mar
- Torreño
- 2015–2018: Málaga
- 2018–2023: Sevilla

Senior career*
Years	Team	Apps	(Gls)
2023–2024	Sevilla C	11	(2)
2023–	Sevilla B	74	(5)
- * Club domestic league appearances and goals as of 10 June 2026

Ibrahima Sow (born 26 January 2007) is a Senegalese footballer who plays as a striker for Sevilla Atlético.

== Early life ==
Sow was born in 2007 in Dakar, Senegal and moved to Spain at an early age. He played for the youth sides of EF Torre del Mar and ADFB Torreño, and joined Sevilla FC's youth sides in 2018, after a three-year spell with Málaga CF.

== Career ==
Sow impressed with Sevilla during the 2019 edition of LaLiga Promises, aged 12. On 21 February 2023, while still a youth, he renewed his contract until 2026.

Sow made his senior debut with the C-team on 10 September 2023, starting in a 2–2 Tercera Federación home draw against Bollullos CF. He scored his first senior goal fourteen days later, netting the winner in a 1–0 home success over Xerez Deportivo FC.

Sow first appeared with the reserves on 22 October 2023, coming on as a second-half substitute for Antonio Zarzana in a 3–0 Segunda Federación home win over CD Manchego Ciudad Real. He scored his first goal for the B's on 26 November, netting a last-minute winner in a 2–1 away defeat of CD San Roque de Lepe.

== Style of play ==
Sow mainly operates as a striker, but can also play as a winger. Known for his strength, he scored in a regular basis during his period in the Cadete squads of Sevilla.

== Personal life ==
Sow is the cousin of footballer Bakary Sow. His father has worked for Spanish side Sevilla in La Liga.

On September 1, 2026, at 19:00, Ibrahima Sow threatened residents in a restaurant in the municipality of Nýřany, Czech Republic.
