= Sevilla Atlético =

Association football club in Spain

- Full name: Sevilla Atlético Club
- Nicknames: Sevilla B Franjirrojos; Nervionenses
- Founded: 1 March 1950; 76 years ago as Club Deportivo Puerto
- Ground: Estadio Jesús Navas; Seville, Andalusia, Spain
- Capacity: 8,000
- President: José María del Nido Carrasco
- Head coach: Diego Galiano
- League: Segunda Federación – Group 4
- 2025–26: Primera Federación – Group 2, 20th of 20 (relegated)
Home colours	Away colours	Third colours

Sevilla Atlético is a Spanish football team based in Seville in the autonomous community of Andalusia. Founded in 1950, it is the reserve team of Sevilla. It plays in Segunda Federación – Group 4 and holds home games at the Estadio Jesús Navas, which has a 7,500-seat capacity.

Reserve teams in Spain play in the same football pyramid as their senior team rather than a separate league. Reserve teams cannot play in the same division as their senior team, so Sevilla Atlético is not eligible for promotion to La Liga, the division in which Sevilla's first team plays. Reserve teams are also no longer permitted to enter the Copa del Rey.

== History ==
Founded in 1950, Sevilla Atlético quickly reached Tercera División, winning the competition in 1961 and 1962 and also spending the 1962–63 season in Segunda División. After three years in the regional leagues in the early 1970s, the club returned to the third level in 1976.

In 1977, the Segunda División B was created as the new third division, and Sevilla B spent time in that and the fourth categories. In 1999, it fell short in the second level promotion play-offs, after finishing the regular season as runner-up – earlier, in 1991, the club changed its name to Sevilla Fútbol Club B. In the following decade, in spite of three consecutive top-three finishes, the team underachieved in the playoffs. In the 2006–07 season, however, after a 1–0 aggregate win against Burgos, courtesy of a Lolo goal in the second leg at home, it returned to division two after more than 40 years of absence. In 2006, it was again renamed Sevilla Atlético.

After two seasons in division two, with a ninth place in the first year, in a campaign which also saw manager Manuel Jiménez leave to take the reins of the first team, Sevilla Atlético returned again to the third. Sevilla Atlético finished their 2015–16 campaign in third place in Group 4 and qualified for the promotion play-offs, they beat Lleida in the penalties 5–4 and therefore promoted back to Segunda División after seven years. In the 2016-17 season, the club finished 13th among 22 teams, never occupying a relegation spot. In the 2017-18 season, after losing manager Diego Martínez as well as key players Borja Lasso, Antonio Cotán, and Diego González and with ex-Sevilla player Luis Tevenet as manager, Sevilla Atlético were relegated from the second division, finishing last placed 22nd with 32 points.

=== Club names ===
- Club Deportivo Puerto (1950–1960)
- Sevilla Atlético Club (1960–1991)
- Sevilla Fútbol Club "B" (1991–1992)
- Sevilla Fútbol Club, S.A.D. "B" (1992–2006)
- Sevilla Atlético (2006–present)

== Season to season ==
- As CD Puerto

Season	Tier	Division	Place	Copa del Rey
1950–51	5	2ª Reg.		
1951–52	5	2ª Reg.		
1952–53	4	1ª Reg.	11th	
1953–54	4	1ª Reg.	13th	
1954–55	4	1ª Reg.	3rd	
1955–56	3	3ª	4th	
1956–57	3	3ª	11th	
1957–58	3	3ª	13th	
1958–59	3	3ª	4th	
1959–60	3	3ª	2nd	

- As Sevilla Atlético Club (Farm team)

Season	Tier	Division	Place	Copa del Rey
1960–61	3	3ª	1st	
1961–62	3	3ª	1st	
1962–63	2	2ª	15th	Round of 32
1963–64	3	3ª	7th	
1964–65	3	3ª	5th	
1965–66	3	3ª	2nd	
1966–67	3	3ª	3rd	
1967–68	3	3ª	2nd	
1968–69	3	3ª	5th	
1969–70	3	3ª	5th	
1970–71	3	3ª	5th	First round
1971–72	3	3ª	12th	
1972–73	3	3ª	20th	
1973–74	4	1ª Reg.	3rd	
1974–75	4	1ª Reg.	2nd	
1975–76	4	Reg. Pref.	2nd	

Season	Tier	Division	Place	Copa del Rey
1976–77	3	3ª	10th	First round
1977–78	3	2ª B	13th	Second round
1978–79	3	2ª B	6th	First round
1979–80	3	2ª B	18th	Second round
1980–81	4	3ª	1st	
1981–82	4	3ª	3rd	Third round
1982–83	4	3ª	1st	First round
1983–84	4	3ª	1st	First round
1984–85	4	3ª	3rd	First round
1985–86	4	3ª	1st	First round
1986–87	4	3ª	1st	First round
1987–88	3	2ª B	12th	First round
1988–89	3	2ª B	2nd	First round
1989–90	3	2ª B	3rd	
1990–91	3	2ª B	18th	N/A

- As Sevilla FC's reserve team

Season	Tier	Division	Place
1991–92	4	3ª	1st
1992–93	3	2ª B	7th
1993–94	3	2ª B	14th
1994–95	3	2ª B	7th
1995–96	3	2ª B	7th
1996–97	3	2ª B	9th
1997–98	3	2ª B	11th
1998–99	3	2ª B	2nd
1999–2000	3	2ª B	19th
2000–01	4	3ª	1st
2001–02	3	2ª B	11th
2002–03	3	2ª B	10th
2003–04	3	2ª B	3rd
2004–05	3	2ª B	1st
2005–06	3	2ª B	3rd
2006–07	3	2ª B	1st
2007–08	2	2ª	9th
2008–09	2	2ª	22nd
2009–10	3	2ª B	15th
2010–11	3	2ª B	2nd

Season	Tier	Division	Place
2011–12	3	2ª B	10th
2012–13	3	2ª B	14th
2013–14	3	2ª B	14th
2014–15	3	2ª B	14th
2015–16	3	2ª B	3rd
2016–17	2	2ª	13th
2017–18	2	2ª	22nd
2018–19	3	2ª B	10th
2019–20	3	2ª B	9th
2020–21	3	2ª B	4th / 1st
2021–22	3	1ª RFEF	17th
2022–23	4	2ª Fed.	10th
2023–24	4	2ª Fed.	1st
2024–25	3	1ª Fed.	8th
2025–26	3	1ª Fed.	20th
2026–27	4	2ª Fed.	

- 5 seasons in Segunda División
- 3 seasons in Primera Federación/Primera División RFEF
- 31 seasons in Segunda División B
- 3 seasons in Segunda Federación
- 27 seasons in Tercera División

== Current squad ==
As of 8 September 2026

Note: Flags indicate national team as defined under FIFA eligibility rules; some limited exceptions apply. Players may hold more than one non-FIFA nationality.

No.	Pos.	Nation	Player
1	GK	ESP	Rafa Romero
2	DF	ESP	Jorge Moreno
3	DF	ESP	Sergio Martínez
4	DF	ESP	Iker Muñoz
5	DF	ROU	Robert Jălade
6	MF	ESP	Victor Chumachenko
7	FW	SEN	Ibra Sow
8	MF	ESP	Edu Altozano
9	FW	ESP	Iker Villar
10	MF	ESP	Nico Guillén
11	FW	ESP	Manuel Ángel
13	GK	ARG	Loren Luchino
15	FW	ESP	Miguel Sierra
16	MF	ESP	Jesús Cruz
17	FW	ESP	José Pedraza
18	FW	ESP	Marc Scuri
19	DF	ESP	Antonio Soriano

No.	Pos.	Nation	Player
20	DF	ESP	Valentino Fattore
21	FW	ESP	Eric Alcaide
22	DF	GER	Tamiou Kpebane
23	FW	ESP	Jesuly
24	DF	ESP	Marc Fernández
25	GK	ESP	Sergio Recio
26	MF	ESP	Hugo Ortiz
27	FW	ESP	Francis Lociga
28	FW	ESP	Bruno Luque
29	DF	ESP	Manu Arenas
30	MF	ESP	Aitor Caballero
31	GK	CAN	Carlos Toscano
32	GK	MAR	Rayan Azouagh
33	DF	LUX	Aston da Silva
34	DF	ESP	Mario Díaz
36	DF	ESP	Adrián Pérez

=== Current technical staff ===
Position	Staff
Head coach	(Spain) Diego Galiano
Goalkeeping coach	(Spain) Tomás Romero
Doctor	(Spain) Fátima Breña
Physiotherapist	(Spain) Ángel Chinchilla
Equipment manager	(Spain) Javi Arza

Last updated: 8 September 2026
Source: Sevilla FC

== Selected former players ==
Note: this list includes players that have appeared in at least 100 league games and/or have reached international status.

- (Argentina) Diego Perotti
- (Argentina) Federico Fazio
- (Scotland) Ikechi Anya
- (Cameroon) Lauren
- (Finland) Teemu Pukki
- (Chile) Bryan Rabello
- (Spain) Alejandro Alfaro
- (Spain) Salva
- (Spain) Carlos Fernández
- (Spain) Lolo
- (Spain) Jonathan Ruiz
- (Spain) José Serrano
- (Spain) Juan Velasco
- (Spain) Paco Gallardo
- (Spain) Carlos Marchena
- (Spain) Sergio Rico
- (Spain) Alberto Moreno
- (Spain) Antonio Moreno
- (Spain) Jesús Navas
- (Spain) David Prieto
- (Spain) Antonio Puerta
- (Spain) Sergio Ramos
- (Spain) José Antonio Reyes
- (Spain) Diego Capel
- (Spain) Luis Alberto
- (Spain) Antonio Cotán
- (Spain) David Carmona
- (Spain) José Matos
- (Spain) Borja Lasso
- (Spain) Curro

- (Spain) José Campaña

== Selected former coaches ==
- (Spain) Francisco Antúnez (1968–70)
- (Spain) Antonio López Habas (1977–78)
- (Spain) José Ángel Moreno (1988–94)
- (Spain) Juan Carlos Álvarez (1994–95)
- (Spain) Julián Rubio (1996–97)
- (Spain) José Ángel Moreno (1997)
- (Spain) Juan Carlos Álvarez (1998–99), (1999–00)
- (Spain) Manuel Ruiz Sosa (2000)
- (Spain) Manolo Jiménez (2000–07)
- (Spain) Diego (2009–10)
- (Spain) Diego Martínez (2014–17)
- (Spain) Luis Tevenet (2017–18)
- (Spain) Luci (2018–19)
- (Spain) Paco Gallardo (2019–21)
- (Spain) Juan Acejo (2021–present)
