= Emanuele Sala =

Italian footballer (born 2007)

Personal information
- Full name: Emanuele Sala
- Date of birth: 27 November 2007 (age 18)
- Place of birth: Sesto San Giovanni, Italy
- Height: 1.91 m (6 ft 3 in)
- Position: Midfielder

Team information
- Current team: Milan Futuro

Youth career
- AC Milan

Senior career*
Years	Team	Apps	(Gls)
2025–	Milan Futuro (res.)	38	(4)
2025–	AC Milan	0	(0)

International career^{‡}
2022	Italy U16	1	(0)
2024	Italy U17	13	(2)
2024–	Italy U19	24	(1)
2025–	Italy U20	11	(0)
Medal record
Men's football
Representing Italy
UEFA European Under-17 Championship
Winner	2024 Cyprus
- * Club domestic league appearances and goals as of 22:55, 8 November 2026 (UTC) ‡ National team caps and goals as of 23:45, 16 November 2026 (UTC)

Emanuele Sala (born 27 November 2007) is an Italian professional footballer who plays as a midfielder for Serie D club Milan Futuro, the reserve team of Serie A club AC Milan. He is an Italian youth international.

== Club career ==
=== AC Milan ===
He is a youth product of AC Milan, signing his first professional contract with the club in late 2023, until 2026.

Sala received his first call-up and made his professional debut with the newly created reserve team Milan Futuro by the inaugural head coach Daniele Bonera, during the 2024–25 season on 5 January 2025, for the 0–0 away draw Serie C match against Carpi, as a starter. The following season, Milan Futuro was relegated to the Serie D, he scored his first professional goal on 4 January 2026, during a 3–0 away win Serie D match against Leon.

Sala was called up by first team head coach Massimiliano Allegri for the pre-season friendly match against English Premier League club Leeds United at the Aviva Stadium, in Dublin, Ireland, on 9 August 2025, starting during a 1–1 draw.

He received his first official call-up with AC Milan on 19 October 2025, during a 2–1 home win Serie A match against Fiorentina; however, he was an unused substitute. Five days later on 24 October, Sala was called up again for the 2–2 home draw Serie A match against newly promoted Pisa, but did not feature. He signed his first professional contract on November. The following month Sala was called up again for the 2–0 loss Supercoppa Italiana match against Napoli on 18 December. He got called-up with AC Milan for 4 matches across all three competitions during the 2025–26 season, including the league, Coppa Italia, as well as the super cup, he failed to make his debut with the first team, yet managed to scored 5 goals and 3 assists while appearing in 30 matches with Milan Futuro across all competitions.

== International career ==
Sala is an Italy youth international, having represented the under-16, under-17, under-19, and under-20s.

With the U17 side he won the 2024 UEFA European Under-17 Championship.

== Career statistics ==
As of match played 8 November 2026

Appearances and goals by club, season and competition
Club	Season	League			Cup		Continental		Other		Total	
Club	Season	Division	Apps	Goals	Apps	Goals	Apps	Goals	Apps	Goals	Apps	Goals
Milan Futuro	2024–25	Serie C	1	0	—		—		—		1	0
Milan Futuro	2025–26	Serie D	26	4	2 (Note: Appearances in Coppa Italia Serie D)	1	—		1 (Note: Appearance in Serie D play-offs)	0	29	5
Milan Futuro	2026–27	Serie D	11	0	0	0	—		0	0	11	0
Milan Futuro	Total		38	4	2	1	—		1	0	41	5
AC Milan	2025–26	Serie A	0	0	—		—		0	0	0	0
AC Milan	Total		0	0	—		—		0	0	0	0
Career total			38	4	2	1	0	0	1	0	41	5

== Honours ==
Italy U17

- UEFA European Under-17 Championship: 2024
