= Alessandro Bonomi =

Italian footballer (born 2006)

Personal information
- Date of birth: 8 April 2006 (age 20)
- Place of birth: Como, Italy
- Positions: Attacking midfielder; winger

Team information
- Current team: Milan Futuro

Youth career
- AC Milan

Senior career*
Years	Team	Apps	(Gls)
2024–	Milan Futuro (res.)	8	(1)
- * Club domestic league appearances and goals as of 23:55, 8 November 2026 (UTC)

Alessandro Bonomi (born 8 April 2006) is an Italian professional footballer who plays as an attacking midfielder and winger for Serie D club Milan Futuro, the reserve team of Serie A club AC Milan.

== Club career ==
Bonomi is a youth product of AC Milan, during the 2023–24 season, he had a breakthrough with the Primavera, under head coach Ignazio Abate in the Campionato Primavera 1. On 16 May 2026, after 11 years with the club, he renewed his contract with AC Milan.

Bonomi received his first call-up with AC Milan's newly created reserve team during the 2024–25 season, for the 2–0 away win Serie C match against Perugia, on 27 October 2024, as an unused substitute however. The following season, he made his professional debut with Milan Futuro, now relegated to the Serie D, as a starter during the 2–0 home win Coppa Italia Serie D match against Trevigliese, on 24 August 2025.

Bonomi made his league debut on 6 September 2026, substituting Silvano Vos at the second half of a 4–3 home win Serie D match against Caldiero Terme on the league's opening match for the season. He scored his first professional goal with Milan Futuro the following month, during a 2–1 away win league match against ChievoVerona, on 18 October.

== International career ==
In November 2023, Bonomi was called-up with the Italy U18s.

== Career statistics ==
As of match played 8 November 2026

Appearances and goals by club, season and competition
Club	Season	League			Cup (Note: Includes in Coppa Italia Serie D)		Continental		Other		Total	
Club	Season	Division	Apps	Goals	Apps	Goals	Apps	Goals	Apps	Goals	Apps	Goals
Milan Futuro	2024–25	Serie C	0	0	—		—		—		0	0
Milan Futuro	2025–26	Serie D	—		2	0	—		—		2	0
Milan Futuro	2026–27	Serie D	8	1	1	0	—		0	0	9	1
Milan Futuro	Total		8	1	3	0	—		0	0	11	1
Career total			8	1	3	0	0	0	0	0	11	1
