= Yahya Idrissi-Regragui =

Footballer (born 2007)

Personal information
- Full name: Yahya Idrissi-Regragui
- Date of birth: 25 November 2007 (age 18)
- Place of birth: Watford, England
- Height: 1.79 m (5 ft 10 in)
- Positions: Attacking midfielder; winger

Team information
- Current team: Milan Futuro

Youth career
- West Ham United
- 2021–2026: Chelsea
- 2026–: AC Milan

Senior career*
Years	Team	Apps	(Gls)
2026–	Milan Futuro	6	(1)

International career^{‡}
- Morocco U15
2023–2024	Morocco U16	5	(1)
2023–2024	Morocco U17	2	(1)
2024–2025	Morocco U18	2	(1)
- * Club domestic league appearances and goals as of 8 November 2026 ‡ National team caps and goals as of 26 May 2024 (UTC)

Yahya Idrissi-Regragui (Arabic: يحيى إدريسي الركراكي; born 25 November 2007) is a professional footballer who plays as an attacking midfielder or winger for Serie D club Milan Futuro, the reserve team of Serie A club AC Milan. Born in England, he is a youth international for Morocco.

== Club career ==
As a youth player, Idrissi-Regragui started his youth career with the academy of West Ham United, then moved to the academy of Chelsea aged 11 in 2021. During his time with Chelsea he won the Under-17 Premier League Cup during the 2023–24 season, and attracted interest from fellow Premier League clubs, with both Manchester United and Newcastle United, among others trying to recruit him, before he signed his first professional contract with Chelsea the following season in 2025.

On 2 February 2026, Idrissi-Regragui was transferred to Italian club AC Milan, signing a four-year contract, and initially joining their reserve team Milan Futuro.

He was one of the 26 players called up with the senior squad by head coach Ruben Amorim on 12 July 2026, for pre-season ahead of the 2026–27 season.

Idrissi-Regragui featured with the primavera side (in the Campionato Primavera 1) after arriving at the second half of the 2025–26 season, he went on to make his professional debut with the reserve team the following season, during the 3–1 home loss Coppa Italia Serie D match against Sant'Angelo, on 29 August 2026. The following month, on 2 September, Idrissi-Regragui made his second appearance with Milan Futuro during the 2–1 away win Premier League International Cup group B match against the U21 squad of English Premier League club Everton. He made his league debut with the team on 11 October, substituting Mattia Cappelletti in the second half of a 2–1 home loss Serie D match against Rovato.

== International career ==
He was born in Watford, England, and also holds Moroccan citizenship, being eligible to represent either nation.

Idrissi-Regragui is a Moroccan youth international, having represented the under-15, under-16, under-17 and the under-18 teams.

== Career statistics ==
As of match played 8 November 2026

Appearances and goals by club, season and competition
Club	Season	League			National Cup		League Cup (Note: Includes Coppa Italia Serie D)		Other		Total	
Club	Season	Division	Apps	Goals	Apps	Goals	Apps	Goals	Apps	Goals	Apps	Goals
Milan Futuro	2026–27	Serie D	6	1	0	0	1	0	0	0	7	1
Career total			6	1	0	0	1	0	0	0	7	1
