= Damir Zukić =

Slovenian footballer (born 2004)

Personal information
- Date of birth: 20 May 2004 (age 22)
- Place of birth: Ljubljana, Slovenia
- Height: 1.90 m (6 ft 3 in)
- Positions: Defender; defensive midfielder

Team information
- Current team: Milan Futuro

Youth career
- –2023: Ilirija 1911
- 2025–: AC Milan

Senior career*
Years	Team	Apps	(Gls)
2023	Ilirija 1911	15	(0)
2024	Primorje	14	(0)
2024–	Milan Futuro (res.)	37	(0)

International career^{‡}
2025–	Slovenia U21	4	(0)
- * Club domestic league appearances and goals as of 4 November 2026 ‡ National team caps and goals as of 5 June 2026

Damir Zukić (born 20 May 2004) is a Slovenian professional footballer who plays as a defender and defensive midfielder for Serie D club Milan Futuro, the reserve team of Serie A club AC Milan. He is a Slovenia youth international.

== Club career ==
As a youth player, he played in his hometown for Ilirija 1911 until 2023, with whom he debuted professionally the same year, the following year he moved to Primorje. Zukić then moved to Italy and in 2024 joined Milan Futuro, the reserve team of Serie A side AC Milan.

== International career ==
He was born in Ljubljana, Slovenia, and holds dual Slovenian and Bosnian citizenship, being eligible to represent either nation.

Zukić has represented Slovenia at the under-21 level since 2025.

== Career statistics ==
As of match played 4 November 2026

Appearances and goals by club, season and competition
Club	Season	League			Cup (Note: Includes Slovenian Cup, Coppa Italia Serie C, Coppa Italia Serie D)		Other		Total	
Club	Season	Division	Apps	Goals	Apps	Goals	Apps	Goals	Apps	Goals
Ilirija 1911	2022–23	Slovenian Second League	2	0	—		—		2	0
Ilirija 1911	2023–24	Slovenian Second League	13	0	1	0	—		14	0
Ilirija 1911	Total		15	0	1	0	—		16	0
Primorje	2023–24	Slovenian Second League	9	0	—		—		9	0
Primorje	2024–25	Slovenian PrvaLiga	5	0	—		—		5	0
Primorje	Total		14	0	—		—		14	0
Milan Futuro	2024–25	Serie C	11	0	1	0	—		12	0
Milan Futuro	2025–26	Serie D	19	0	2	0	0	0	21	0
Milan Futuro	2026–27	Serie D	7	0	1	0	0	0	8	0
Milan Futuro	Total		37	0	4	0	0	0	40	0
Career total			66	0	5	0	0	0	71	0
