= Mattia Piermarini =

Italian footballer (born 2006)

Personal information
- Date of birth: 13 March 2006 (age 20)
- Place of birth: Ascoli Piceno, Italy
- Height: 1.87 m (6 ft 2 in)
- Position: Centre-back

Team information
- Current team: Milan Futuro

Youth career
- –2024: Ascoli
- 2025–: AC Milan

Senior career*
Years	Team	Apps	(Gls)
2024–2025	Ascoli	19	(0)
2026–	Milan Futuro (res.)	4	(0)
- * Club domestic league appearances and goals as of 23:55, 11 October 2026 (UTC)

Mattia Piermarini (born 13 February 2006) is an Italian professional footballer who plays as a centre-back for Serie D club Milan Futuro, the reserve team of Serie A club AC Milan.

== Club career ==
=== Ascoli ===
Born in Ascoli Piceno, Italy, he is an academy graduate of his hometown club Ascoli. Signing his first professional contract on 5 June 2024, until 2027. Piermarini was promoted to the senior team for the 2024–25 season, he received his first call-up and made his professional debut with Ascoli on 11 August 2024, as a starter during a 2–1 home win Coppa Italia Serie C first round match against Gubbio.

=== AC Milan ===
On 14 August 2025, he signed with Serie A club AC Milan, immediately joining the reserve team ahead of the 2025–26 season. Piermarini started his first season with AC Milan playing four matches with the Primavera in the Campionato Primavera 1, during August and September 2025. He went on to get called-up three times and made two appearances as a starter for Milan Futuro's last few matches of the 2025–26 season, first on 2 April 2026, during a 1–1 home draw Serie D match against Villa Valle, the second time six days later on 8 April, during a 1–0 away loss Serie D match against Real Calepina.

== International career ==
In February 2025, Piermarini was called up to the Italy U19s. Months later, in May, he was called up to the Italy U20s by head coach Bernardo Corradi.

== Career statistics ==
As of match played 11 October 2026

Appearances and goals by club, season and competition
Club	Season	League			Cup		Continental		Other		Total	
Club	Season	Division	Apps	Goals	Apps	Goals	Apps	Goals	Apps	Goals	Apps	Goals
Ascoli	2024–25	Serie C	19	0	—		—		—		19	0
Ascoli	Total		19	0	—		—		—		19	0
Milan Futuro	2025–26	Serie D	2	0	—		—		—		2	0
Milan Futuro	2026–27	Serie D	2	0	—		—		1 (Note: Appearance in Premier League International Cup)	0	3	0
Milan Futuro	Total		4	0	—		—		1	0	5	0
Career total			23	0	0	0	0	0	1	0	24	0
