= Cheveyo Balentien =

Surinamese footballer (born 2006)

Personal information
- Full name: Cheveyo Dayshaun Balentien
- Date of birth: 18 December 2006 (age 19)
- Place of birth: Almere, Netherlands
- Height: 1.89 m (6 ft 2 in)
- Positions: Winger; forward

Team information
- Current team: AC Milan

Youth career
- –2016: SC Buitenboys
- 2016–2022: Utrecht
- 2022–2025: ADO Den Haag
- 2026–: AC Milan

Senior career*
Years	Team	Apps	(Gls)
2025	ADO Den Haag	1	(0)
2025–	Milan Futuro (res.)	5	(2)
2025–	AC Milan	2	(0)

International career^{‡}
2024–	Suriname U20	1	(0)
2026–	Suriname	1	(0)
- * Club domestic league appearances and goals as of 22:55, 11 October 2026 (UTC) ‡ National team caps and goals as of 23:55, 15 November 2026 (UTC)

Cheveyo Dayshaun Balentien (born 18 December 2006) is a professional footballer who plays as a winger and forward for Serie A club AC Milan, and its reserve team Serie D club Milan Futuro. Born in the Netherlands, he plays for the Suriname national team.

== Club career ==
=== ADO Den Haag ===
On 10 August 2025, he made his professional debut with ADO Den Haag in a 5–1 Eerste Divisie win against Willem II as a substitute.

=== AC Milan ===
On 21 August 2025, Italian club AC Milan announced the signing of Balentien from ADO Den Haag, with the intention to involve him in the Milan Futuro reserve team, set to play in the Serie D for the 2025–26 season. He signed a contract with the club until 2030.

Soon after, he made his debut with Milan Futuro, playing 25 minutes in a Coppa Italia Serie D game against Trevigliese. Being immediately noticed by first team head coach Massimiliano Allegri, he was instead promoted to the senior team and called up for the next Serie A league game against Lecce, during which he made his debut as a substitute for Santiago Giménez on the 88th minute.

During his first season he went on to feature with the AC Milan Primavera, playing one match in the Campionato Primavera 1, the following season, he featured with the Primavera as well.

== International career ==
Balentien was born in the Netherlands, and is of Surinamese descent. He is eligible to represent either nation. Balentien made his debut as a starter with Suriname U20s during a 2–0 win friendly match against Liechtenstein U19s, on 24 September 2024.

He was one of the players who were called-up with the Suriname national team by head coach Henk Fraser for the friendly match against Lithuania and Eswatini on 15 November 2026. Balentien debuted with the senior team on 15 November 2026, as a starter and assisting twice during a 4–0 win friendly match against the Eswatini national team.

== Personal life ==
Born in the Netherlands, Balentien is of Surinamese descent.

== Career statistics ==
=== Club ===
As of match played 11 October 2026

Appearances and goals by club, season and competition
Club	Season	League			Cup (Note: Includes Coppa Italia, Coppa Italia Serie D)		Continental		Other		Total	
Club	Season	Division	Apps	Goals	Apps	Goals	Apps	Goals	Apps	Goals	Apps	Goals
ADO Den Haag	2025–26	Eerste Divisie	1	0	—		—		—		1	0
ADO Den Haag	Total		1	0	—		—		—		1	0
Milan Futuro	2025–26	Serie D	4	2	2	0	—		0	0	6	2
Milan Futuro	2026–27	Serie D	1	0	1	0	—		1 (Note: Appearance in Premier League International Cup)	0	3	0
Milan Futuro	Total		5	2	3	0	—		1	0	9	2
AC Milan	2025–26	Serie A	2	0	1	0	—		0	0	3	0
AC Milan	Total		2	0	1	0	0	0	0	0	3	0
Career total			8	2	4	0	0	0	1	0	13	2

=== International ===
As of match played 15 November 2026

Appearances and goals by national team and year
National team	Year	Apps	Goals
Suriname	2026	1	0
Total		1	0
