= Nirash Perera =

Italian footballer (born 2007)

Personal information
- Full name: Nirash Raffaello Perera
- Date of birth: 2 January 2007 (age 19)
- Place of birth: Milan, Italy
- Positions: Defender; wide midfielder

Team information
- Current team: AC Milan
- Number: 47

Youth career
- AC Milan

Senior career*
Years	Team	Apps	(Gls)
2025–	Milan Futuro (res.)	13	(2)
2026–	AC Milan	0	(0)

International career^{‡}
2024	Italy U17	2	(0)
2024–2025	Italy U18	4	(0)
- * Club domestic league appearances and goals as of 8 November 2026 ‡ National team caps and goals as of 24 March 2025

Nirash Raffaello Perera (born 2 January 2007) is an Italian professional footballer who plays as a defender and wide midfielder for Serie D club Milan Futuro, the reserve team of Serie A club AC Milan.

== Early life ==
Perera was born on 2 January 2007 in Italy. A native of Milan metropolitan area, Italy, he is of Sri Lankan descent through his parents.

== Club career ==
=== AC Milan ===
As a youth player, Perera joined the youth academy of Serie A club AC Milan, where he played in the Campionato Primavera 1 and UEFA Youth League, signing his first professional contract with the club on February 2024.

He was promoted to the club's reserve team and debuted professionally in the Serie D during the 2025–26 season, signing a contract extension on March 2026. Perera was called-up with Rossoneri senior team the following season, during a 2–0 away win league match against Udinese on 25 October 2026, as an unused substitute however.

== International career ==
Perera is an Italy youth international, having represented the under-17 and under-18 levels, and is eligible to represent Sri Lanka internationally through his parents.

On 23 January 2024, he made his debut with the U17 team during a 3–3 away friendly draw with the Spain U17. On 10 October 2024, he debuted with the under-18 team during a 0–2 home loss to the Austria U18.

== Style of play ==
Perera plays as a defender or midfielder and is right-footed. Italian news website SportMania24 wrote in 2026 that "Perera plays on the left flank, but... he can also play as a full-back, midfielder, and, if necessary, as part of a three-man attack".

== Career statistics ==
As of match played 8 November 2026

Appearances and goals by club, season and competition
Club	Season	League			Cup (Note: Includes Coppa Italia Serie D)		Continental		Other		Total	
Club	Season	Division	Apps	Goals	Apps	Goals	Apps	Goals	Apps	Goals	Apps	Goals
Milan Futuro	2025–26	Serie D	4	1	—		—		1 (Note: Appearance in Serie D play-offs)	0	5	1
Milan Futuro	2026–27	Serie D	9	1	1	0	—		1 (Note: Appearance in Premier League International Cup)	0	11	1
Milan Futuro	Total		13	2	1	0	—		1	0	15	2
AC Milan	2026–27	Serie A	0	0	0	0	0	0	0	0	0	0
AC Milan	Total		0	0	0	0	0	0	0	0	0	0
Career total			13	2	1	0	0	0	1	0	15	2
