= Matteo Pittarella =

Italian footballer (born 2007)

Personal information
- Full name: Matteo Pittarella
- Date of birth: 25 May 2008 (age 18)
- Height: 1.94 m (6 ft 4 in)
- Position: Goalkeeper

Team information
- Current team: AC Milan
- Number: 37

Youth career
- –2019: Lecco
- 2019–: AC Milan

Senior career*
Years	Team	Apps	(Gls)
2025–	AC Milan	0	(0)
2025–	Milan Futuro (res.)	16	(0)

International career^{‡}
2025	Italy U17	1	(0)
- * Club domestic league appearances and goals as of 23:55, 1 November 2026 (UTC) ‡ National team caps and goals as of 23:45, 23 January 2025 (UTC)

Matteo Pittarella (born 25 May 2008) is an Italian professional footballer who plays as a goalkeeper for Serie D club Milan Futuro, the reserve team of Serie A club AC Milan. He is an Italian youth international.

== Club career ==
Pittarella is a youth product of Lecco, in 2019 he joined the youth academy of Serie A giants AC Milan, with whom he signed his first professional contract in July 2025.

He was called up by first team head coach Massimiliano Allegri for the pre-season friendly match against English Premier League club Leeds United on 9 August 2025, starting during a 1–1 draw.

Pittarella received his first official call-up with AC Milan on 17 August 2025, during a 2–0 home win 2025–26 Coppa Italia match against Bari, as an unused substitute however. Six days later on 23 August, he was called up again for the 1–2 home loss Serie A match against Cremonese, but did not feature. The next day he received his first call-up with Milan Futuro for a 2–0 home win Coppa Italia Serie D qualification match against Trevigliese on 24 August, yet six days later he made his professional debut, starting with Milan Futuro during a 1–0 away win Coppa Italia Serie D match against Gozzano, on 30 August.

He was one of the 26 players called-up with the senior squad by head coach Ruben Amorim on 12 July 2026, for pre-season ahead of the 2026–27 season.

== International career ==
Pittarella has represented Italy with the under-17 squad since 2025.

== Career statistics ==
As of match played 1 November 2026

Appearances and goals by club, season and competition
Club	Season	League			Cup (Note: Includes Coppa Italia Serie D)		Continental		Other		Total	
Club	Season	Division	Apps	Goals	Apps	Goals	Apps	Goals	Apps	Goals	Apps	Goals
Milan Futuro	2025–26	Serie D	8	0	1	0	—		0	0	9	0
Milan Futuro	2026–27	Serie D	8	0	1	0	—		1 (Note: Appearance in Premier League International Cup)	0	10	0
Milan Futuro	Total		16	0	2	0	—		1	0	19	0
AC Milan	2025–26	Serie A	0	0	0	0	—		—		0	0
AC Milan	2026–27	Serie A	0	0	0	0	0	0	0	0	0	0
AC Milan	Total		0	0	0	0	0	0	0	0	0	0
Career total			16	0	2	0	0	0	1	0	19	0
