= Federico Colombo (footballer) =

Italian footballer (born 2007)

Personal information
- Date of birth: 5 January 2007 (age 19)
- Place of birth: Busto Arsizio, Italy
- Position: Defender

Team information
- Current team: Milan Futuro

Youth career
- Olgiatese
- AC Milan

Senior career*
Years	Team	Apps	(Gls)
2025–	Milan Futuro (res.)	7	(0)

International career^{‡}
2022	Italy U15	6	(0)
2022–2023	Italy U16	15	(0)
2023–2024	Italy U17	9	(0)
2024–2025	Italy U18	4	(0)
- * Club domestic league appearances and goals as of 23:55, 8 November 2026 (UTC) ‡ National team caps and goals as of 23:45, 5 August 2025 (UTC)

Federico Colombo (born 5 January 2007) is an Italian professional footballer who plays as a defender for Serie D club Milan Futuro, the reserve team of Serie A club AC Milan. He is a former Italian youth international.

== Club career ==
Colombo is an AC Milan youth product, after 9 seasons progressing through the academy at the club, he renewed his contract on 23 March 2026.

After having been called-up for 5 matches with AC Milan's reserve team during the 2025–26 season, he made his professional debut with Milan Futuro on 3 May 2026, substituting Luca Menon at the second half of a 10–1 home win Serie D match against Vogherese.

On 2 September 2026, Colombo scored his first goal with Milan Futuro, as a starter during the 2–1 away win Premier League International Cup group B match against the U21 squad of English Premier League club Everton.

== International career ==
He is an Italy youth international, having featured with the under-15, under-16, under-17 and under-18 teams.

== Career statistics ==
As of match played 8 November 2026

Appearances and goals by club, season and competition
Club	Season	League			Cup		Continental		Other		Total	
Club	Season	Division	Apps	Goals	Apps	Goals	Apps	Goals	Apps	Goals	Apps	Goals
Milan Futuro	2025–26	Serie D	1	0	—		—		0	0	1	0
Milan Futuro	2026–27	Serie D	6	0	—		—		1 (Note: Appearance in Premier League International Cup)	1	7	1
Milan Futuro	Total		7	0	—		—		1	1	8	1
Career total			7	0	0	0	0	0	1	1	8	1
