= El Hadji Malick Cissé =

Senegalese footballer (born 2008)

Personal information
- Date of birth: 4 January 2008 (age 18)
- Place of birth: Dakar, Senegal
- Height: 1.85 m (6 ft 1 in)
- Positions: Centre-back; defensive midfielder

Team information
- Current team: AC Milan
- Number: 48

Youth career
- –2026: Be Sport
- 2026–: AC Milan

Senior career*
Years	Team	Apps	(Gls)
2026–	Milan Futuro (res.)	9	(0)
2026–	AC Milan	0	(0)

International career^{‡}
2025	Senegal U17	8	(1)
- * Club domestic league appearances and goals as of 8 November 2026 ‡ National team caps and goals as of 15 November 2025

El Hadji Malick Cissé (born 4 January 2008) is a Senegalese professional footballer who plays as a centre-back and defensive midfielder for Serie D club Milan Futuro, the reserve team of Serie A club AC Milan.

== Club career ==
He was born in Dakar, Senegal, and is a youth product of his hometown academy Be Sport. On 2025, clubs from Europe showed interest in recruiting him, first from the two English clubs Burnley and Ipswich Town, followed by French side Lyon, Italian side AC Milan, as well as Spanish side Barcelona.

On 30 January 2026, AC Milan announced Cissé's signing, initially joining both the reserve team and the primavera squad. He made 12 appearances with the primavera in the Campionato Primavera 1 during his first season with the club.

Cissé made his professional debut with Milan Futuro on 29 August 2026, as a starter during the 3–1 home loss first round Coppa Italia Serie D match against Sant'Angelo. Eight days later, he started with the team during a 4–3 home win Serie D match against Caldiero Terme on the league's opening match for the season, on September 6th.

He was called-up with the AC Milan senior team on 25 October 2026, during a 2–0 away win Serie A match against Udinese, as an unused substitute however.

== International career ==
Cissé is a Senegal youth international, having participated in the 2025 FIFA U-17 World Cup, as one of the 21 players of the U17s squad.

== Career statistics ==
As of match played 8 November 2026

Appearances and goals by club, season and competition
Club	Season	League			Cup (Note: Includes Coppa Italia Serie D)		Continental		Other		Total	
Club	Season	Division	Apps	Goals	Apps	Goals	Apps	Goals	Apps	Goals	Apps	Goals
Milan Futuro	2026–27	Serie D	9	0	1	0	—		0	0	10	0
Milan Futuro	Total		9	0	1	0	—		0	0	10	0
AC Milan	2026–27	Serie A	0	0	0	0	0	0	0	0	0	0
AC Milan	Total		0	0	0	0	0	0	0	0	0	0
Career total			9	0	1	0	0	0	0	0	10	0
