= Lorenzo Ossola =

Italian footballer (born 2007)

Personal information
- Date of birth: 12 February 2007 (age 19)
- Place of birth: Varese, Italy
- Positions: Winger; attacking midfielder

Team information
- Current team: AC Milan
- Number: 40

Youth career
- Varese
- AC Milan

Senior career*
Years	Team	Apps	(Gls)
2025–	Milan Futuro (res.)	30	(7)
2026–	AC Milan	0	(0)

International career^{‡}
2025	Italy U18	3	(0)
2025–	Italy U19	1	(0)
- * Club domestic league appearances and goals as of 23:55, 8 November 2026 (UTC) ‡ National team caps and goals as of 23:45, 5 August 2025 (UTC)

Lorenzo Ossola (born 12 February 2007) is an Italian professional footballer who plays as a winger or attacking midfielder and captain of Serie D club Milan Futuro, the reserve team of Serie A club AC Milan. He is an Italian youth international.

== Club career ==
He was born in Varese, Italy, and started his youth career with the academy of his hometown club Varese Calcio, later joining the academy of AC Milan.

On 17 October 2025, after 12 years progressing through the youth ranks at the club, Ossola renewed his contract with AC Milan. He made his professional debut during the 2025–26 season with the reserve team, substituting Demirel Hodžić at the second half of a goalless away draw Serie D match against Casatese Merate, on 24 September 2025. Two months later, on 26 November, Ossola scored his first professional goal with Milan Futuro, the winner during a 1–0 home win Serie D match against Real Calepina.

He was one of the 26 players called-up with the senior squad by head coach Ruben Amorim on 12 July 2026, for pre-season ahead of the 2026–27 season.

On 2 September 2026, Ossola scored the second goal with Milan Futuro during the 2–1 away win Premier League International Cup group B match against the U21 squad of English Premier League club Everton. Four days later, he started with the team and scored the first goal of a 4–3 home win Serie D match against Caldiero Terme on the league's opening match for the season, on September 6th.

Ossola was called-up with the AC Milan senior team on 25 October 2026, during a 2–0 away win Serie A match against Udinese, as an unused substitute however.

== International career ==
He is an Italy youth international, having featured with the under-18, and under-19 teams.

== Career statistics ==
As of match played 8 November 2026

Appearances and goals by club, season and competition
Club	Season	League			Cup (Note: Includes Coppa Italia Serie D)		Continental		Other		Total	
Club	Season	Division	Apps	Goals	Apps	Goals	Apps	Goals	Apps	Goals	Apps	Goals
Milan Futuro	2025–26	Serie D	21	3	1	0	—		1 (Note: Appearance in Serie D play-offs)	0	23	3
Milan Futuro	2026–27	Serie D	9	4	1	0	—		1 (Note: Appearance in Premier League International Cup)	1	11	5
Milan Futuro	Total		30	7	2	0	—		2	1	34	8
AC Milan	2026–27	Serie A	0	0	0	0	0	0	0	0	0	0
AC Milan	Total		0	0	0	0	0	0	0	0	0	0
Career total			30	7	2	0	0	0	2	1	34	8
