= Milan Futuro =

Reserve team of AC Milan

- Nickname: Milan U23
- Founded: 27 June 2024; 2 years ago
- Ground: Stadio Felice Chinetti, Solbiate Arno, Italy
- Capacity: 4,500
- Owner(s): RedBird Capital Partners (99.93%); Private shareholders (0.07%)
- Sporting director: Jovan Kirovski
- Head coach: Sergio Navarro Barquero
- League: Serie D
- 2025–26: Serie D, Group B: 4th of 18
- Website: www.acmilan.com/en
Home colours	Away colours	Third colours

Milan Futuro (lit. 'Future [AC] Milan'), occasionally referred to as Milan U23, is a professional football club based in Milan, Lombardy, Italy, which acts as the reserve team of Serie A club AC Milan. Founded on 27 June 2024, the club started in Serie C. Following relegation, they compete in Serie D.

== History ==
AC Milan's reserve team was admitted to Serie C on 27 June 2024 to fill a vacancy created by Ancona's exclusion. After five years as an assistant coach for the main senior squad, on 27 June 2024, Daniele Bonera was unveiled as their inaugural head coach, the team was registered under the denomination of Milan Futuro (Future Milan). For their first season, the team was put into Girone B of Serie C, usually intended for teams from Central Italy, due to the presence of other reserves team from Northern Italy in their respective group (Girone A). This was due to not saturating a single group with too many professional reserve teams.

Bonera was dismissed from his role on 24 February 2025, leaving the team deep in the relegation zone. A day later, on 25 February 2025, Massimo Oddo was appointed as head coach.

In their debut season, Milan Futuro were immediately relegated to the Serie D. They placed 18th in the regular season, and they lost to SPAL (2–1 on aggregate) in the relegation play–offs.

On 30 June 2026, the club announced the departure of head coach Massimo Oddo ahead of the 2026–27 season. He was replaced by Sergio Navarro Barquero, who was appointed as the head coach on 4 July 2026.

On 12 August 2026, the club's participation in the Premier League International Cup for the English competition's 13th edition was announced.

== Stadium ==
The team will play home games in the Stadio Felice Chinetti, nearby Solbiate Arno, a comune in the Province of Varese.

== Players ==
=== Current squad ===
The team currently competes in the Serie D and the Coppa Italia Serie D. It also participates in the Premier League International Cup. Sergio Navarro Barquero has been the head coach since July 2026. The following players are Milan Futuro's roster for the current season. All players are eligible for the first-team, while some players also qualify for the Primavera (under-19) and youth sector squads. Shirt numbers refer to Milan Futuro and may differ from numbers used by the same players in the youth championship or the main roster. Players in bold are those who have been called-up and/or featured with the senior squad during the current season (2026–27).

As of 25 October 2026

Note: Flags indicate national team as defined under FIFA eligibility rules; some limited exceptions apply. Players may hold more than one non-FIFA nationality.

No.	Pos.	Nation	Player
—	GK	FRA	**Léo Paul Bouyer**
—	GK	ITA	Pietro Faccioli
—	GK	ITA	**Matteo Pittarella**
—	DF	ITA	Mattia Cappelletti
—	DF	SEN	**El Hadji Malick Cissé**
—	DF	ITA	Federico Colombo
—	DF	TUR	Berkay Karaca
—	DF	ITA	Matteo Pagliei
—	DF	ITA	**Nirash Raffaello Perera**
—	DF	ITA	Mattia Piermarini
—	DF	SLO	Damir Zukić
—	MF	ITA	Andrea Di Siena
—	MF	MAR	Yahya Idrissi-Regragui

No.	Pos.	Nation	Player
—	MF	ITA	Tommaso Mancioppi
—	MF	ITA	Fabio Pandolfi
—	MF	ITA	Filippo Leonardo Plazzotta
—	MF	ITA	Emanuele Sala
—	MF	NED	**Silvano Vos**
—	FW	GER	Levis Prince Asanji
—	FW	SUR	Cheveyo Balentien
—	FW	ITA	Alessandro Bonomi
—	FW	ITA	Emanuele Borsani
—	FW	ITA	Alex Castiello
—	FW	ENG	Aurelien Guernier
—	FW	ITA	**Luca Menon**
—	FW	ITA	**Lorenzo Ossola** (captain)

=== Main squad & Youth sectors ===
The following players are part of the senior squad or youth sector squads and have either been called by Milan Futuro during the current season for any official competition match, or/and signed an official professional contract with the club. Players in bold are those from the senior squad.

As of 4 November 2026

Note: Flags indicate national team as defined under FIFA eligibility rules; some limited exceptions apply. Players may hold more than one non-FIFA nationality.

No.	Pos.	Nation	Player
—	GK	ITA	Alessandro Pacileo
—	GK	SRB	Ilja Pantelin
—	DF	ITA	Lorenzo Calvani
—	DF	ITA	Mattia Mercogliano
—	DF	ROU	Christian Vechiu
—	DF	BUL	**Valeri Vladimirov**
—	DF	GRE	Spyridon Zormpas

No.	Pos.	Nation	Player
—	MF	AUS	Max Anastasio
—	MF	FRA	Maiga-Hamadoun Cissé
—	MF	ITA	Cristiano Dotta
—	MF	ITA	Riccardo Grassini
—	FW	ITA	Gabriele Borsa
—	FW	ITA	Edoardo Zanaga
—	FW	ITA	Mattia Zaramella

== Management staff ==
Milan Futuro
(Spain) Sergio Navarro Barquero	Head coach
(Spain) Roberto Robles	Assistant coach
(Italy) Pietro Guido Lietti	Athletic coach
(Italy) Mauro Tassotti	Technical
(United States) Jovan Kirovski	Sporting director

== See also ==
- Italian reserve football teams
