= Mattia Cappelletti =

Italian footballer (born 2007)

Personal information
- Date of birth: 10 June 2007 (age 19)
- Place of birth: Milan, Italy
- Position: Right-back

Team information
- Current team: Milan Futuro

Youth career
- AC Milan

Senior career*
Years	Team	Apps	(Gls)
2025–	Milan Futuro (res.)	43	(2)

International career^{‡}
2022–2023	Italy U16	14	(0)
2023–2024	Italy U17	10	(0)
2024	Italy U18	4	(0)
2025–	Italy U19	4	(0)
- * Club domestic league appearances and goals as of 23:55, 8 November 2026 (UTC) ‡ National team caps and goals as of 23:45, 9 September 2025 (UTC)

Mattia Cappelletti (born 10 June 2007) is an Italian professional footballer who plays as a right-back for Serie D club Milan Futuro, the reserve team of Serie A club AC Milan. He is an Italian youth international.

== Club career ==
He is a youth product of his hometown club AC Milan, progressing through the youth ranks up to the reserve team, after impressing with the Primavera, Cappelletti went on to debut professionally with Milan Futuro and scoring two goals during 33 appearances in the Italian fourth-tier during the 2025–26 season.

On 15 January 2026, after 8 seasons with the club, Cappelletti renewed his contract with AC Milan.

== International career ==
He is an Italy youth international, having featured with the under-16, under-17, under-18 and under-19 teams.

== Style of play ==
Cappelletti stands out for his quickness and projection, noting both his defending and attacking as a right-back as well, after some impressive performances during his first professional season, he received comparisons to fellow AC Milan graduate Davide Bartesaghi.

== Career statistics ==
As of match played 8 November 2026

Appearances and goals by club, season and competition
Club	Season	League			Cup (Note: Includes Coppa Italia Serie D)		Continental		Other		Total	
Club	Season	Division	Apps	Goals	Apps	Goals	Apps	Goals	Apps	Goals	Apps	Goals
Milan Futuro	2025–26	Serie D	33	2	1	0	—		1 (Note: Appearance in Serie D play-offs)	0	35	2
Milan Futuro	2026–27	Serie D	10	0	1	0	—		1 (Note: Appearance in Premier League International Cup)	0	12	0
Milan Futuro	Total		43	2	2	0	—		2	0	47	2
Career total			43	2	2	0	0	0	2	0	47	2
