= Luca Menon =

Italian footballer (born 2009)

Personal information
- Date of birth: 6 March 2009 (age 17)
- Place of birth: Italy
- Positions: Wide midfielder; winger

Team information
- Current team: AC Milan
- Number: 49

Youth career
- Cittadella
- 2023–: AC Milan

Senior career*
Years	Team	Apps	(Gls)
2026–	Milan Futuro (res.)	8	(2)
2026–	AC Milan	0	(0)

International career^{‡}
2026–	Italy U17	2	(0)
- * Club domestic league appearances and goals as of 23:55, 1 November 2026 (UTC) ‡ National team caps and goals as of 23:45, 22 January 2026 (UTC)

Luca Menon (born 6 March 2009) is an Italian professional footballer who plays as a wide midfielder and winger for Serie D club Milan Futuro, the reserve team of Serie A club AC Milan. He is an Italian youth international.

== Club career ==
Menon is a youth product of Cittadella, later joining the youth academy of AC Milan in 2023. Having impressed during the 2025–26 season with the under-17 team, he was promoted to the under-23 and reserves and secured his first professional deal.

He received his first call-up with AC Milan's reserve team during the second half of the 2025–26 season, on 22 February 2026, in a 3–0 away win Serie D match against Caldiero Terme, as an unused substitute however. Menon made gis professional debut with Milan Futuro, on 8 February, substituting Matteo Geroli at the second half of a 1–0 away loss Serie D match against Real Calepina. Eighteen days later, he made his second appearance for the club and his first start, during a 3–1 away win Serie D match against Castellanzese. Menon scored his first professional goal the following month, on May 3, starting once again and scoring the 7th goal of a 10–1 home win against Vogherese.

On 30 May 2026, he signed his first professional contract with AC Milan.

Menon was called-up with the AC Milan senior team on 25 October 2026, during a 2–0 away win Serie A match against Udinese, as an unused substitute however.

== International career ==
He is an Italy youth international, having debuted with the under-17 team in 2026.

== Career statistics ==
As of match played 1 November 2026

Appearances and goals by club, season and competition
Club	Season	League			Cup (Note: Includes Coppa Italia Serie D)		Continental		Other		Total	
Club	Season	Division	Apps	Goals	Apps	Goals	Apps	Goals	Apps	Goals	Apps	Goals
Milan Futuro	2025–26	Serie D	3	1	—		—		1 (Note: Appearance in Serie D play-offs)	0	4	1
Milan Futuro	2026–27	Serie D	6	1	1	0	—		1 (Note: Appearance in Premier League International Cup)	0	8	1
Milan Futuro	Total		9	2	1	0	—		2	0	12	2
AC Milan	2026–27	Serie A	0	0	0	0	0	0	0	0	0	0
AC Milan	Total		0	0	0	0	0	0	0	0	0	0
Career total			9	2	1	0	0	0	2	0	12	2
