= Berkay Karaca =

Turkish footballer (born 2006)

Personal information
- Date of birth: 11 January 2006 (age 20)
- Place of birth: Gelsenkirchen, Germany
- Positions: Left-back; left midfielder; left winger

Team information
- Current team: Milan Futuro

Youth career
- 2014–2025: Schalke 04

Senior career*
Years	Team	Apps	(Gls)
2025–	Milan Futuro	25	(0)

International career^{‡}
2023	Turkey U18	3	(0)
2024	Turkey U19	6	(0)
- * Club domestic league appearances and goals as of 15 March 2026 ‡ National team caps and goals as of 18 November 2024

Berkay Karaca (born 11 January 2006) is a professional footballer who plays as a left-back, left midfielder and left winger for Serie D club Milan Futuro, the reserve team of Serie A club AC Milan. Born in Germany, he is a former Turkish youth international.

== Club career ==
As a youth player, he played in Germany for Schalke 04 from 2014 until 2025. Following his stint there, he moved to Italy and joined Milan Futuro, the reserve team of Serie A side AC Milan. Karaca made his professional debut with Milan Futuro for a 2–0 home win Coppa Italia Serie D qualification match against Trevigliese on 24 August 2025.

He was one of the 26 players called-up with the senior squad by head coach Ruben Amorim on 12 July 2026, for pre-season ahead of the 2026–27 season.

== International career ==
He was born in Gelsenkirchen, Germany, and holds dual German and Turkish citizenship, being eligible to represent either nation.

Karaca has represented Turkey at under-18 and under-19 levels.

== Career statistics ==
As of match played 15 March 2026

Appearances and goals by club, season and competition
Club	Season	League			Cup		Continental		Other		Total	
Club	Season	Division	Apps	Goals	Apps	Goals	Apps	Goals	Apps	Goals	Apps	Goals
Milan Futuro	2025–26	Serie D	25	0	2 (Note: Appearances in Coppa Italia Serie D)	0	—		0	0	27	0
Milan Futuro	Total		25	0	2	0	—		0	0	27	0
Career total			25	0	2	0	0	0	0	0	27	0
