= ASD Solbiatese Calcio 1911 =

Italian football club

Solbiatese
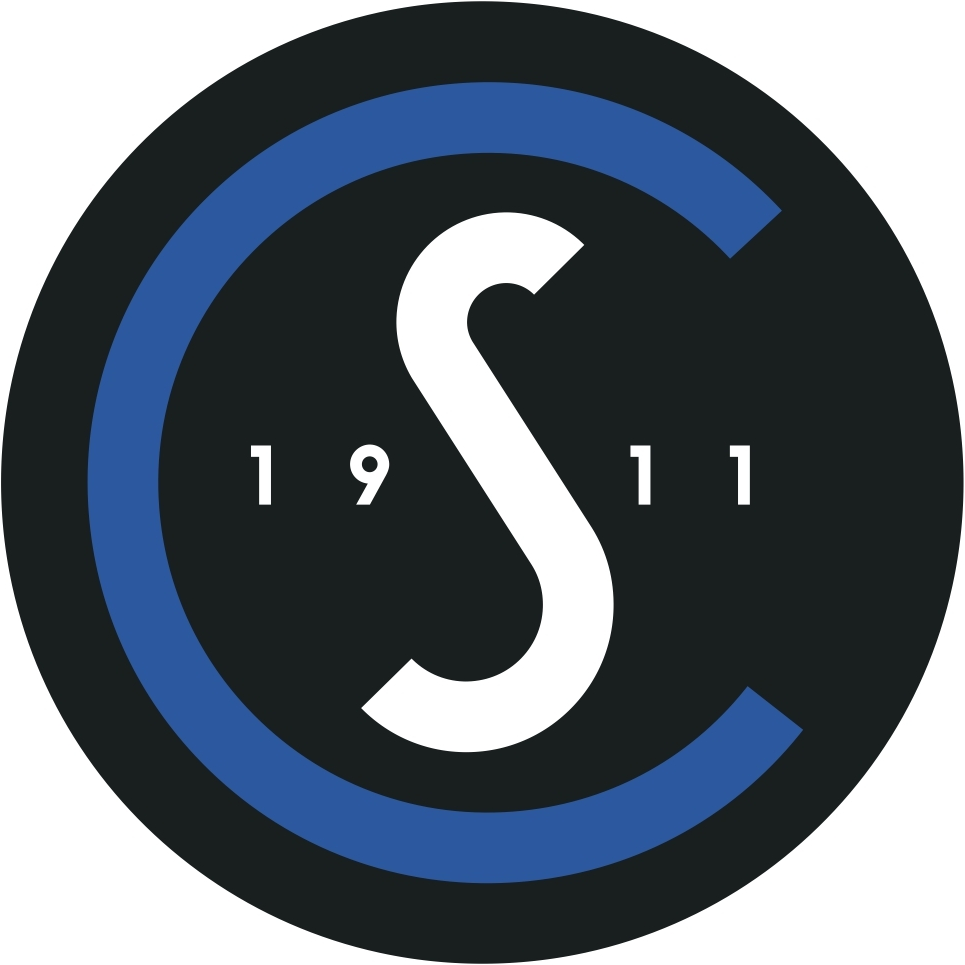
- Full name: Associazione Sportiva Dilettantistica; Solbiatese Calcio 1911
- Founded: 2012
- Ground: Stadio Felice Chinetti, Solbiate Arno, Italy
- Capacity: 4,500
- Chairman: Oreste Battiston
- Manager: Marco Spilli
- League: Eccellenza
- 2024–25: Eccellenza Lombardy Group A, 2nd of 18th
Home colours	Away colours

A.S.D. Solbiatese Calcio 1911 is an Italian association football club located in Somma Lombardo and also representing the town of Solbiate Arno (Province of Varese), Lombardy. It currently plays in Eccellenza.

== History ==
=== Foundation ===
The club was founded in 2012 after the merger of A.S. Solbiatese Arno Calcio and S.S. Sommese 1920.

=== Before the merger ===
==== Solbiatese Arno Calcio ====
The team was founded in 1911 as A.S. Solbiatese Calcio in Solbiate Arno and spent several seasons in Serie C and Serie C2. It was refounded as Solbiatese Arno Calcio in 2000, taking Solbiatese Arno Calcio, by merging with A.S. Arno Calcio (founded 1980 in the same town).

During the seasons 2007–10, their top scorer has been Massimo 'Max' Marsich.

In the 2010–11 season, the club was relegated from Serie D group B to Eccellenza Lombardy. In the next season it was again relegated to Promozione Lombardy

==== S.S. Sommese 1920 ====
The team was founded in 1920 in Somma Lombardo.

In the 2011–12 it was ranked 2nd in Eccellenza Lombardy/A and was defeated by Real Vicenza in the final playoffs.

== Colors and badge ==
Its colors are black and blue.
