= Stadio Felice Chinetti =

Football stadium in Varese province, Italy

Coordinates: 45°42′36″N 8°48′36″E

- Interactive map of Stadio Felice Chinetti
- Location: Via per Oggiona, 1 Solbiate Arno, Province of Varese, Lombardy, Italy
- Owner: Solbiate Arno
- Capacity: 4,500
- Surface: Grass; 105 x 65 m

Construction
- Opened: 1955
- Renovated: 2004

Tenants
- Solbiatese (1955–); Inter Milan Women (2019–2020); Milan Futuro (2024–)

Stadio Felice Chinetti is a stadium in Solbiate Arno, Italy. it's the home ground of Solbiatese and Milan Futuro. The stadium holds 4,500 spectators.

== History ==
The stadium was built in 1955 and is named after Felice Chinetti (1921–1944), a paratrooper from Solbiate Arno who served in the 185th Paratroopers Division "Folgore". He was killed on 8 July 1944 during the Battle of Filottrano.

The stadium was the home ground of Calcio Solbiatese during the club's most successful years, including its seasons in Serie C during the 1970s and in Serie C2 during the 1990s. The first major renovation took place in 2004, when the covered main stand was rebuilt.

During the 2010s, the stadium hosted several home matches of the Calcio Milan Primavera team. In particular, during the 2017–18 season it served as the venue for all of Milan Primavera's home matches while the Centro Sportivo Vismara was undergoing redevelopment.

During the 2019–20 season, the stadium hosted the home matches of Calcio femminile Inter, newly promoted to Serie A, before the club relocated to the Arena Civica.

Beginning with the 2024–25 season, the stadium became the home ground of Calcio Milan Futuro, the reserve team of Calcio Milan competing in Serie C. To meet the league's infrastructure requirements, Milan invested approximately €700,000 in stadium upgrades.
