= ASD Sasso Marconi 1924 =

Italian football club

Sasso Marconi
- Full name: A.S.D. Sasso Marconi 1924
- Founded: 1924; 102 years ago 2019; 7 years ago (merger)
- Ground: Centro Sportivo Giacomo Carbonchi
- Capacity: 1,800
- Chairman: Alessandro Pozzi
- Manager: Carlo Alberto Bertone
- League: Serie D
- 2025–26: Serie D/D, 14th (qualified for relegation play-off)
| Home colours | Away colours |

A.S.D. Sasso Marconi 1924 is an Italian association football club located in Sasso Marconi, Bologna. It currently plays in Serie D.

== History ==
The club was founded in 2006, but merged from Sasso Marconi and Axys Zola. Therefore, they were reinstated in Serie D from the 2019–20 season.

== Colors and badge ==
The team's colors are yellow and blue.
