= 2024–25 Serie C =

Serie C
- Season: 2024–25
- Dates: Regular season: 25 August 2024 – 27 April 2025; Play-offs: 4 May 2025 – 7 June 2025
- Promoted: Padova; Virtus Entella; Avellino; Pescara (via play-off)
- Relegated: Caldiero Terme; Union Clodiense Chioggia; Lucchese (bankrupt); SPAL (excluded); Milan Futuro; Sestri Levante; Legnago Salus; Messina; Turris (excluded); Taranto (excluded)
- Matches: 1,066
- Goals: 2,523 (2.37 per match)
- Top goalscorer: Emanuele Cicerelli; Vanja Vlahović (19 goals each)
- Biggest home win: Ternana 8–0 Legnago
- Biggest away win: Triestina 1–5 Atalanta U23; Milan Futuro 1–5 Torres; Potenza 1–5 Trapani; Crotone 0–4 Avellino; Latina 0–4 Crotone; Benevento 1–5 Juventus Next Gen (Play-off)
- Highest scoring: Ternana 8–0 Legnago; Potenza 4–4 Giugliano; Atalanta U23 7–1 Torres (Play-off)
- Longest winning run: 11 matches Avellino (27–31, 33–38)
- Longest unbeaten run: 32 matches Virtus Entella (7–38)
- Longest winless run: 20 matches Clodiense (3–22)
- Longest losing run: 7 matches Pro Patria (20–26); Messina (15–16, 18–21, 23)
- Highest attendance: 19,141; Pescara 0–1 Ternana (Play-off final)
- Lowest attendance: 71; Clodiense 2–2 Renate
- Total attendance: 3,012,727
- Average attendance: 2,590

The 2024–25 Serie C, officially known as Serie C NOW for sponsorship, was the 66th season of the Serie C, the third tier of the Italian football league system, organized by the Lega Pro.

== Changes ==
The league is composed of 60 teams, geographically divided into three different groups. The group composition was decided and formalized by the Serie C league committee between July and August.

The following teams have changed divisions since the 2023–24 season:

=== To Serie C ===
Relegated from Serie B

- Ternana
- Ascoli
- Feralpisalò
- Lecco

Promoted from Serie D

- Alcione (Group A winners)
- Caldiero Terme (Group B winners)
- Union Clodiense Chioggia (Group C winners)
- Carpi (Group D winners)
- Pianese (Group E winners)
- Campobasso (Group F winners)
- Cavese (Group G winners)
- Team Altamura (Group H winners)
- Trapani (Group I winners)

=== From Serie C ===
Promoted to Serie B

- Mantua
- Cesena
- Juve Stabia
- Carrarese

Relegated to Serie D

- Fiorenzuola
- Pro Sesto
- Alessandria
- Recanatese
- Fermana
- Olbia
- Virtus Francavilla
- Monterosi
- Brindisi

=== Exclusions and readmissions ===
On 10 June 2024, the Italian Football Federation rejected Ancona's application due to outstanding debts. On 14 June 2024, the repechage criteria were announced, with new Under-23 teams being given priority to fill the vacancy created by Ancona's exclusion. Milan Futuro, AC Milan's reserve team, were finally admitted on 27 June.

On 7 March 2025, Taranto was excluded by the league due to repeated financial irregularities.

== Group A (North) ==
=== Stadia and locations ===
Ten teams from Lombardy, 6 teams from Veneto, 2 teams from Piedmont, 1 team from Friuli-Venezia Giulia and 1 team from Trentino-Alto Adige/Südtirol.

Location of teams in 2024–25 Serie C (Group A)
Location of teams in 2024–25 Serie C (Group A) (Lombardy)

Club	City	Stadium	Capacity
AlbinoLeffe	Albino and Leffe	AlbinoLeffe Stadium (Zanica)	1,791
Alcione	Milan	Stadio Breda (Sesto San Giovanni)	3,523
Arzignano Valchiampo	Arzignano	Stadio Tommaso Dal Molin	1,690
Atalanta U23	Bergamo	Comunale di Caravaggio (Caravaggio)	2,180
Caldiero Terme	Caldiero	Mario Gavagnin-Sinibaldo Nocini (Verona)	1,500
Feralpisalò	Salò and Lonato del Garda	Stadio Lino Turina (Salò)	2,364
Giana Erminio	Gorgonzola	Città di Gorgonzola	3,766
Lecco	Lecco	Stadio Rigamonti-Ceppi	5,508
Lumezzane	Lumezzane	Tullio Saleri	4,150
Novara	Novara	Silvio Piola	17,875
Padova	Padua	Euganeo	32,420
Pergolettese	Crema	Giuseppe Voltini	4,095
Pro Patria	Busto Arsizio	Carlo Speroni	5,000
Pro Vercelli	Vercelli	Silvio Piola	5,526
Renate	Renate	Città di Meda (Meda)	2,500
Trento	Trento	Briamasco	3,000
Triestina	Trieste	Nereo Rocco	26,566
Union Clodiense Chioggia	Chioggia	Mario Sandrini (Legnago)	2,152
Vicenza	Vicenza	Romeo Menti	17,163
Virtus Verona	Verona	Mario Gavagnin-Sinibaldo Nocini	1,500

=== Table ===
Pos	Team	Pld	W	D	L	GF	GA	GD	Pts	Qualification
1	Padova (C, P)	38	26	8	4	65	24	+41	86	Promotion to Serie B and Supercoppa di Serie C
2	Vicenza	38	25	8	5	59	24	+35	83	National play-offs 2nd round
3	Feralpisalò	38	21	9	8	53	30	+23	72	National play-offs 1st round
4	AlbinoLeffe	38	16	12	10	46	38	+8	60	Group play-off 2nd round
5	Renate	38	18	6	14	35	36	−1	60	Group play-offs 1st round
6	Giana Erminio	38	16	9	13	44	39	+5	57 (Note: Head-to-head points: Giana Erminio 9, Trento 5, Atalanta U23 2.)	Group play-offs 1st round
7	Trento	38	14	15	9	47	42	+5	57	Group play-offs 1st round
8	Atalanta U23	38	16	9	13	65	53	+12	57	Group play-offs 1st round
9	Virtus Verona	38	15	11	12	52	43	+9	56	Group play-offs 1st round
10	Arzignano	38	15	8	15	45	46	−1	53	Group play-offs 1st round
11	Novara (Note: 2 points deducted due to administrative irregularities.)	38	14	12	12	42	39	+3	52	
12	Alcione Milano	38	13	8	17	33	37	−4	47	
13	Lecco	38	10	13	15	36	47	−11	43	
14	Pergolettese	38	11	9	18	36	49	−13	42	
15	Lumezzane	38	9	15	14	40	55	−15	42	
16	Triestina (Note: 5 point deducted due to administrative irregularities.) (O)	38	12	8	18	40	45	−5	39	Relegation play-outs
17	Pro Vercelli (O)	38	9	10	19	30	51	−21	37	Relegation play-outs
18	Pro Patria (Note: Later restored in Serie C following Lucchese’s bankruptcy.) (T)	38	6	16	16	32	44	−12	34	Loser of relegation play-outs, then reprived from relegation to Serie D
19	Caldiero Terme (R)	38	8	9	21	39	64	−25	33	Loser of relegation play-outs, relegated to Serie D
20	Union Clodiense Chioggia (R)	38	4	9	25	34	67	−33	21	Relegation to Serie D

Source: Lega Pro, Soccerway (in English)
Rules for classification: 1) Points; 2) Head-to-head points; 3) Head-to-head goal difference; 4) Goal difference; 5) Goals scored; 6) Lower goals against; 7) Wins; 8) Lower losses; 9) Away wins; 10) Lower home losses.
(Note: Head-to-head record is used only after all the matches between the teams in question have been played)
(C) Champions; (O) Play-off winners; (P) Promoted; (R) Relegated; (T) Qualified, but not yet for the particular phase indicated

=== Results ===
Home \ Away	ALB	ALC	ARZ	ATA	CAL	FER	GIA	LEC	LUM	NOV	PAD	PER	PPA	PVE	REN	TRE	TRI	UCC	VIC	VVE
AlbinoLeffe	—	1–0	1–1	2–2	2–3	0–0	0–3	0–0	2–0	1–1	0–2	3–0	0–0	3–1	1–0	0–0	2–0	1–0	1–1	3–1
Alcione	0–2	—	0–1	0–1	1–1	0–3	2–2	0–0	1–0	2–1	0–2	2–1	2–0	1–2	0–1	0–1	1–0	2–0	1–2	0–0
Arzignano	1–1	0–2	—	3–1	2–1	1–0	1–0	2–0	1–1	0–2	1–4	1–1	1–0	3–1	1–2	1–2	3–0	1–0	1–2	0–2
Atalanta U23	1–1	1–2	1–3	—	2–0	4–1	1–3	5–2	0–1	0–0	1–1	5–1	2–1	2–0	4–0	1–1	3–1	2–1	2–2	0–3
Caldiero Terme	0–2	0–2	1–2	1–1	—	2–3	1–0	1–0	2–2	2–0	0–2	0–1	1–1	4–1	2–2	2–0	0–2	2–2	0–2	0–3
Feralpisalò	1–0	1–1	1–1	3–1	2–0	—	2–0	2–1	1–1	0–0	1–0	1–2	1–0	2–0	3–1	2–0	2–0	3–1	2–0	1–0
Giana Erminio	0–2	0–2	0–1	2–1	3–1	3–1	—	1–0	1–1	2–2	0–1	0–0	1–1	1–2	2–1	2–0	3–0	2–1	0–0	1–1
Lecco	2–1	1–0	3–2	0–1	5–1	0–0	1–0	—	1–1	1–1	0–3	1–0	2–1	2–1	0–2	1–2	2–1	1–0	1–1	1–1
Lumezzane	1–0	1–1	1–0	2–1	2–2	1–3	3–2	4–0	—	2–2	0–0	0–2	1–1	0–2	0–2	0–2	1–3	0–2	0–1	0–3
Novara	2–0	1–1	1–0	0–3	3–1	0–1	0–1	0–0	0–0	—	2–1	3–1	2–1	1–0	1–0	3–0	2–3	0–0	0–0	3–0
Padova	3–0	1–0	1–1	3–1	1–0	0–0	3–0	2–1	2–0	2–1	—	2–1	3–1	1–1	1–0	3–0	1–1	2–1	1–0	4–1
Pergolettese	1–2	1–2	0–2	3–1	3–2	2–2	0–1	0–0	1–0	1–2	1–2	—	2–1	1–0	0–1	0–0	1–0	2–2	0–1	1–2
Pro Patria	1–2	0–0	1–0	1–2	0–0	0–0	1–2	2–1	4–1	1–1	1–1	1–1	—	1–1	0–1	1–1	0–0	3–1	0–3	1–1
Pro Vercelli	0–2	1–0	0–3	0–0	2–1	1–0	0–1	3–2	3–3	1–0	1–3	1–0	2–2	—	1–2	0–0	0–1	1–1	0–1	0–0
Renate	0–2	0–1	0–0	1–0	0–0	1–0	1–0	1–0	1–2	0–1	3–2	2–1	1–0	1–0	—	1–1	0–1	2–1	0–1	0–3
Trento	5–1	1–0	3–2	2–2	1–0	3–2	2–0	1–1	2–2	1–3	0–1	1–1	0–0	1–0	0–0	—	1–1	5–0	3–1	1–1
Triestina	1–1	1–0	3–0	1–5	0–1	1–2	0–1	1–1	2–3	6–0	0–1	0–0	1–0	1–1	0–1	1–0	—	3–0	2–0	0–2
Union Clodiense Chioggia	1–3	1–3	1–1	1–3	0–1	0–1	0–1	1–1	1–1	2–1	1–2	0–1	1–2	2–0	2–2	2–2	1–0	—	1–2	1–2
Vicenza	2–0	4–1	4–0	3–0	2–1	1–0	2–2	1–0	1–1	1–0	1–1	2–0	2–0	2–0	1–0	3–0	1–0	2–1	—	3–0
Virtus Verona	1–1	1–0	2–1	1–2	5–2	1–3	1–1	1–1	0–1	1–0	1–0	1–2	0–1	0–0	1–2	1–2	2–2	4–1	2–1	—

Source: Soccerway
Legend: Blue = home team win; Yellow = draw; Red = away team win.
For upcoming matches, an "a" indicates there is an article about the rivalry between the two participants.

== Group B (Centre) ==
=== Stadia and locations ===
Four feet teams from Tuscany, 3 teams from Emilia-Romagna, 3 teams from Umbria, 2 teams from Abruzzo, 2 teams from Liguria, 2 teams from Marche, 1 team from Sardinia, 1 team from Lombardy, 1 team from Veneto and 1 team from Molise.

Location of teams in 2024–25 Serie C (Group B)

Club	City	Stadium	Capacity
Arezzo	Arezzo	Città di Arezzo	13,128
Ascoli	Ascoli Piceno	Cino e Lillo Del Duca	12,461
Campobasso	Campobasso	Nuovo Romagnoli	21,800
Carpi	Carpi	Sandro Cabassi	5,510
Gubbio	Gubbio	Pietro Barbetti	4,939
Legnago	Legnago	Mario Sandrini	2,152
Lucchese	Lucca	Porta Elisa	12,800
Milan Futuro	Milan	Stadio Felice Chinetti (Solbiate Arno)	4,500
Perugia	Perugia	Renato Curi	23,625
Pescara	Pescara	Adriatico – Giovanni Cornacchia	20,515
Pianese	Piancastagnaio	Stadio comunale (Piancastagnaio)	1,500
Pineto	Pineto	Pavone-Mariani	1,500
Pontedera	Pontedera	Ettore Mannucci	2,700
Rimini	Rimini	Romeo Neri	9,768
Sestri Levante	Sestri Levante	Stadio Alberto Picco (La Spezia)	11,466
SPAL	Ferrara	Paolo Mazza	16,134
Torres	Sassari	Vanni Sanna	7,480
Ternana	Terni	Libero Liberati	17,460
Virtus Entella	Chiavari	Comunale di Chiavari	5,587
Vis Pesaro	Pesaro	Tonino Benelli	4,898

=== Table ===
Pos	Team	Pld	W	D	L	GF	GA	GD	Pts	Qualification
1	Virtus Entella (P)	38	23	14	1	61	24	+37	83	Promotion to Serie B and Supercoppa di Serie C
2	Ternana (Note: 2 points deducted due to financial administrative irregularities.)	38	22	10	6	64	23	+41	74	National play-offs 2nd round
3	Torres	38	19	11	8	55	36	+19	68	National play-offs 1st round
4	Pescara (O, P)	38	19	10	9	55	35	+20	67	Group play-offs 2nd round
5	Arezzo	38	18	8	12	47	37	+10	62	Group play-offs 1st round
6	Vis Pesaro	38	15	13	10	44	34	+10	58	Group play-offs 1st round
7	Pineto	38	15	12	11	46	49	−3	57	Group play-offs 1st round
8	Pianese	38	15	9	14	48	47	+1	54	Group play-offs 1st round
9	Rimini (Note: 2 points deducted due to financial administrative irregularities.)	38	13	14	11	45	35	+10	51	National play-offs 1st round (Note: Rimini qualify for the national play-offs first round by winning the Coppa Italia Serie C.)
10	Pontedera	38	13	9	16	54	54	0	48	Group play-offs 1st round
11	Gubbio	38	13	9	16	32	42	−10	48	Group play-offs 1st round
12	Perugia	38	11	14	13	43	41	+2	47	
13	Carpi	38	11	11	16	41	48	−7	44	
14	Campobasso	38	11	10	17	36	46	−10	43	
15	Ascoli	38	9	13	16	37	46	−9	40	
16	Lucchese (Note: 6 points deducted due to unpaid salaries, then bankrupted) (E, R, R)	38	10	15	13	47	64	−17	39	Playouts, then phoenix in Eccellenza
17	SPAL (Note: 3 points deducted due to financial administrative irregularities, then excluded from the league.) (E, R, R)	38	9	11	18	41	61	−20	35	Playouts, then phoenix in Eccellenza
18	Milan Futuro (R)	38	7	13	18	36	57	−21	34	Relegation play-outs
19	Sestri Levante (R)	38	6	13	19	34	54	−20	31	Relegation play-outs
20	Legnago (R)	38	6	11	21	30	63	−33	29	Relegation to Serie D

Source: Lega Pro, Soccerway (in English)
Rules for classification: 1) Points; 2) Head-to-head points; 3) Head-to-head goal difference; 4) Goal difference; 5) Goals scored; 6) Lower goals against; 7) Wins; 8) Lower losses; 9) Away wins; 10) Lower home losses.
(Note: Head-to-head record is used only after all the matches between the teams in question have been played)
(E) Eliminated; (O) Play-off winners; (P) Promoted; (R) Relegated

=== Results ===
Home \ Away	ARE	ASC	CAM	CRP	GUB	LEG	LUC	MLF	PER	PES	PIA	PIN	PON	RIM	SLV	SPL	TER	TOR	VEN	VPE
Arezzo	—	1–1	1–0	0–1	2–0	1–0	4–1	1–0	2–0	0–0	4–2	1–2	2–4	1–1	1–0	2–1	1–2	0–1	1–1	0–0
Ascoli	1–0	—	1–1	2–1	1–0	1–2	1–2	2–2	0–1	1–2	1–0	0–1	1–1	0–1	4–1	1–1	0–3	1–2	0–1	0–0
Campobasso	0–1	2–0	—	2–1	1–1	2–0	3–0	1–1	2–1	2–2	0–2	1–3	0–2	1–2	0–0	4–0	1–0	0–1	0–2	3–2
Carpi	2–1	2–2	0–0	—	0–2	0–0	0–0	0–0	2–0	1–2	0–1	1–1	2–1	2–2	0–2	1–0	1–2	1–2	0–3	2–1
Gubbio	0–0	0–0	0–0	1–0	—	0–3	3–1	3–2	1–0	1–2	1–0	2–1	0–1	1–0	1–0	1–1	0–0	1–2	0–2	1–3
Legnago	0–3	0–1	0–0	1–3	0–1	—	1–1	2–1	2–2	1–3	0–2	2–1	2–3	1–3	0–3	0–3	0–1	2–3	1–1	0–1
Lucchese	0–1	2–1	2–0	2–2	0–1	1–1	—	1–1	2–1	1–3	3–3	3–3	2–1	2–2	0–0	2–3	4–1	3–2	2–2	1–0
Milan Futuro	2–2	0–2	3–2	1–1	1–0	1–3	0–2	—	0–0	2–3	0–1	0–2	1–1	0–0	2–2	2–1	1–0	1–5	1–2	1–1
Perugia	2–0	2–1	2–1	1–0	1–1	2–1	4–0	0–2	—	0–0	1–1	3–0	3–0	1–4	2–2	3–0	0–0	1–0	0–1	0–1
Pescara	0–1	1–2	3–0	2–1	2–0	0–1	4–1	4–1	0–0	—	2–1	0–1	2–1	0–0	1–0	1–1	0–0	2–2	1–1	2–2
Pianese	2–3	1–1	2–0	1–0	3–1	1–1	2–0	1–0	3–3	3–2	—	4–0	0–3	0–1	0–1	0–1	1–3	2–1	1–1	2–0
Pineto	3–1	1–0	0–1	1–4	1–2	1–0	0–0	2–1	3–1	1–0	1–0	—	1–1	1–1	1–0	3–2	1–0	0–0	2–2	1–1
Pontedera	0–1	1–1	1–2	0–2	2–1	0–0	4–1	1–1	2–1	0–3	1–2	3–2	—	3–0	4–1	5–1	1–2	2–3	1–1	0–1
Rimini	0–2	2–0	1–1	0–0	0–1	1–0	0–0	1–0	1–1	0–1	0–0	1–1	5–1	—	4–2	0–1	0–1	1–1	1–2	0–1
Sestri Levante	0–1	0–0	2–0	1–3	2–1	1–1	1–1	1–2	2–2	3–1	2–3	0–0	0–1	0–3	—	1–3	0–1	1–2	0–0	1–1
SPAL	0–2	2–2	1–2	2–1	3–0	1–1	2–3	1–2	1–1	0–1	1–1	2–1	1–1	0–3	1–1	—	0–3	1–0	0–2	0–1
Ternana	3–1	3–1	0–0	0–1	2–1	8–0	5–0	3–0	0–0	1–2	2–0	3–0	0–0	1–1	1–0	4–1	—	3–1	1–1	2–1
Torres	0–2	1–2	2–1	4–2	0–0	0–0	0–0	0–0	2–1	1–0	3–0	1–1	1–0	2–0	2–1	0–0	1–1	—	0–1	3–0
Virtus Entella	2–1	2–1	3–0	1–1	2–1	3–1	0–0	1–0	1–0	0–1	2–0	4–1	3–1	2–1	4–0	2–1	0–0	1–1	—	1–1
Vis Pesaro	3–0	1–1	1–0	4–0	1–1	3–0	2–1	2–1	0–0	1–0	2–0	1–1	2–0	1–2	0–0	1–1	0–2	1–3	0–1	—

Source: Soccerway
Legend: Blue = home team win; Yellow = draw; Red = away team win.
For upcoming matches, an "a" indicates there is an article about the rivalry between the two participants.

== Group C (South) ==
=== Stadia and locations ===
Seven teams from Campania, five teams from Apulia, three teams from Sicily, two teams from Basilicata, one team from Lazio, one team from Calabria and one team from Piedmont.

Location of teams in 2024–25 Serie C (Group C)
Location of teams in 2024–25 Serie C (Group C) (Campania)
Location of teams in 2024–25 Serie C (Group C) (Basilicata)

Club	City	Stadium	Capacity
Audace Cerignola	Cerignola	Domenico Monterisi	7,453
Avellino	Avellino	Partenio-Adriano Lombardi	26,000
Benevento	Benevento	Ciro Vigorito	16,867
Casertana	Caserta	Alberto Pinto	12,000
Catania	Catania	Angelo Massimino	20,204
Cavese	Cava de' Tirreni	Simonetta Lamberti	5,200
Crotone	Crotone	Ezio Scida	16,640
Foggia	Foggia	Pino Zaccheria	25,085
Giugliano	Giugliano in Campania	Alberto De Cristofaro	6,044
Juventus Next Gen	Turin	Stadio La Marmora-Pozzo (Biella)	3,800
Latina	Latina	Domenico Francioni	9,310
Messina	Messina	San Filippo-Franco Scoglio	38,722
Monopoli	Monopoli	Vito Simone Veneziani	6,880
Picerno	Picerno	Donato Curcio	1,500
Potenza	Potenza	Alfredo Viviani	4,977
Sorrento	Sorrento	Italia	3,600
Taranto	Taranto	Erasmo Iacovone	27,584
Team Altamura	Altamura	Franco Fanuzzi (Brindisi)	7,462
Trapani	Trapani	Provinciale	7,000
Turris	Torre del Greco	Amerigo Liguori	3,566

=== Table ===
Pos	Team	Pld	W	D	L	GF	GA	GD	Pts	Qualification
1	Avellino (C, P)	34	22	9	3	61	26	+35	75	Promotion to Serie B and Supercoppa di Serie C
2	Audace Cerignola	34	19	10	5	50	32	+18	67	National play-offs 2nd round
3	Monopoli	34	15	12	7	36	25	+11	57	National play-offs 1st round
4	Crotone	34	15	9	10	62	49	+13	54	Group play-offs 2nd round
5	Catania (Note: 1 point deducted due to having presented a late bank guarantee.)	34	14	12	8	49	34	+15	53	Group play-offs 1st round
6	Benevento	34	13	13	8	51	34	+17	52	Group play-offs 1st round
7	Potenza	34	12	13	9	55	52	+3	49	Group play-offs 1st round
8	Picerno	34	10	18	6	39	27	+12	48	Group play-offs 1st round
9	Juventus Next Gen	34	12	8	14	44	45	−1	44	Group play-offs 1st round
10	Giugliano	34	12	7	15	51	54	−3	43	Group play-offs 1st round
11	Trapani	34	11	8	15	42	42	0	41	
12	Cavese	34	10	11	13	34	39	−5	41	
13	Team Altamura	34	9	10	15	35	47	−12	37	
14	Sorrento	34	9	8	17	26	49	−23	35	
15	Latina	34	9	7	18	25	56	−31	34	
16	Casertana	34	6	14	14	30	38	−8	32	
17	Foggia (O)	34	7	10	17	34	51	−17	31	Relegation play-outs
18	Messina (Note: 4 point deducted due to unpaid social security contributions.) (R)	34	6	11	17	29	53	−24	25	Loser of relegation play-outs, relegated to Serie D
19	Turris (Note: Turris was excluded on 12 March 2025 following repeated financial irregularities. Previously the club was deducted a total of 11 points due to financial irregularities. Turris went bankrupt in June.) (D, R, R)	0	0	0	0	0	0	0	0	Excluded
20	Taranto (Note: Taranto was excluded on 7 March 2025 following repeated financial irregularities. Previously the club was deducted a total of 19 points due to unpaid salaries.) (D, R, R)	0	0	0	0	0	0	0	0	Excluded

Source: Lega Pro, Soccerway (in English)
Rules for classification: 1) Points; 2) Head-to-head points; 3) Head-to-head goal difference; 4) Goal difference; 5) Goals scored; 6) Lower goals against; 7) Wins; 8) Lower losses; 9) Away wins; 10) Lower home losses.
(Note: Head-to-head record is used only after all the matches between the teams in question have been played)
(C) Champions; (D) Disqualified; (O) Play-off winners; (P) Promoted; (R) Relegated

=== Results ===
Home \ Away	ACR	AVE	BEN	CAS	CAT	CAV	CRO	FOG	GIU	JNG	LAT	MES	MPO	PIC	POT	SOR	TAT	TRA
Audace Cerignola	—	1–1	2–4	0–0	2–0	3–1	1–1	3–2	3–1	3–3	1–0	2–0	1–0	2–1	0–1	2–0	1–1	1–0
Avellino	0–0	—	2–1	5–0	2–2	2–1	2–1	2–1	1–1	2–1	0–1	6–0	1–0	1–0	1–0	1–0	2–1	2–0
Benevento	1–1	2–2	—	1–0	3–2	2–1	1–1	4–0	0–1	4–1	5–0	0–0	0–0	0–0	4–1	1–1	1–1	0–1
Casertana	0–1	1–2	1–1	—	1–3	1–0	2–0	4–0	1–1	2–3	0–2	1–1	0–0	0–1	0–0	4–0	1–1	0–1
Catania	0–0	1–2	1–0	1–1	—	1–1	0–0	1–1	3–1	1–2	0–1	0–0	1–0	0–0	0–2	4–0	2–0	2–1
Cavese	0–2	1–1	1–2	1–0	0–1	—	2–1	2–1	1–0	0–1	1–0	3–3	0–1	1–1	0–0	1–0	1–1	2–1
Crotone	2–1	0–4	2–2	2–3	3–2	1–1	—	3–2	3–2	2–1	4–0	2–0	2–0	0–0	4–1	1–2	2–0	1–2
Foggia	0–1	1–0	2–2	0–0	2–2	0–1	1–1	—	1–2	1–0	1–0	1–2	1–4	1–0	3–4	2–1	0–2	2–2
Giugliano	1–3	1–1	1–2	1–1	3–2	0–0	1–3	2–1	—	1–0	5–2	2–3	1–2	0–2	1–2	5–0	2–3	2–1
Juventus Next Gen	3–4	0–3	2–0	1–0	1–3	3–1	4–1	2–0	0–0	—	0–0	2–0	1–0	1–1	2–3	0–1	1–2	2–0
Latina	0–1	0–3	1–1	1–1	1–4	1–0	0–4	0–0	0–1	3–2	—	1–1	0–1	2–0	1–0	2–0	0–2	0–2
Messina	1–3	0–1	0–0	2–2	0–1	1–3	0–2	0–3	1–0	2–1	2–1	—	0–0	0–0	2–2	0–1	3–1	0–1
Monopoli	1–1	1–1	1–0	1–0	1–2	3–1	1–1	1–0	3–2	0–0	2–0	2–1	—	1–1	0–0	0–1	1–1	2–2
Picerno	0–0	4–1	1–0	0–0	1–1	1–1	5–2	0–0	1–3	1–1	1–2	2–0	2–2	—	1–1	2–0	2–0	0–0
Potenza	1–2	0–0	3–0	2–1	1–2	2–2	3–3	1–1	4–4	1–1	5–1	2–1	0–1	2–2	—	1–0	3–1	1–5
Sorrento	0–1	1–2	0–3	1–1	0–0	1–3	2–1	2–1	3–0	0–1	1–1	2–1	1–2	1–1	0–2	—	2–1	1–1
Team Altamura	1–0	1–3	0–2	2–0	1–1	0–0	1–3	0–2	0–1	2–0	1–1	2–1	0–1	1–2	2–2	1–1	—	2–1
Trapani	5–1	1–2	1–2	0–1	0–3	1–0	0–3	0–0	1–2	1–1	4–0	1–1	0–1	0–3	4–2	0–0	2–0	—

Source: Soccerway
Legend: Blue = home team win; Yellow = draw; Red = away team win.
For upcoming matches, an "a" indicates there is an article about the rivalry between the two participants.

== Promotion play-offs ==
Date and rules were confirmed on March 31 and April 7, 2025, respectively.

=== Group phase ===
==== First round ====
Matches were played on 4 May 2025.

Team 1	Score	Team 2
Renate	0–0	Arzignano
Giana Erminio	1–0	Virtus Verona
Trento	1–2	Atalanta U23
Arezzo	3–1	Gubbio
Vis Pesaro	1–1	Pontedera
Pineto	0–1	Pianese
Catania	3–2	Giugliano
Benevento	1–5	Juventus Next Gen
Potenza	2–0	Picerno

==== Second round ====
Matches were played on 7 May 2025.

Team 1	Score	Team 2
Albinoleffe	1–3	Atalanta U23
Renate	1–2	Giana Erminio
Pescara	2–1	Pianese
Arezzo	0–1	Vis Pesaro
Crotone	0–0	Juventus Next Gen
Catania	1–0	Potenza

=== National phase ===
==== First round ====
The first legs were played on 11 May 2025 and the second legs were played on 14 May 2025.

Team 1	Agg.	Team 2	1st leg	2nd leg
Crotone	4–3	Feralpisalò	3–1	1–2
Atalanta U23	8–3	Torres	7–1	1–2
Giana Erminio	6–2	Monopoli	3–1	3–1
Vis Pesaro	5–4	Rimini	1–1	4–3
Catania	2–2	Pescara	0–1	2–1

==== Second round ====
The first legs were played on 18 May 2025 and the second legs were played on 21 May 2025.

Team 1	Agg.	Team 2	1st leg	2nd leg
Crotone	1–3	Vicenza	1–2	0–1
Giana Erminio	1–2	Ternana	1–0	0–2
Atalanta U23	2–2	Audace Cerignola	0–0	2–2
Vis Pesaro	2–6	Pescara	2–4	0–2

=== Final Four ===
==== Semi-finals ====
The first legs were played on 25 May 2025 and the second legs were played on 28 May 2025.

Team 1	Agg.	Team 2	1st leg	2nd leg
Vicenza	1–3	Ternana	0–0	1–3
Audace Cerignola	2–5	Pescara	1–4	1–1

==== Final ====
The first leg was played on 2 June 2025 and the second leg was played on 7 June 2025.

Team 1	Agg.	Team 2	1st leg	2nd leg
Ternana	1–1 (1–3 p)	Pescara	0–1	1–0 (a.e.t.)

== Relegation play-outs ==
The first legs were played on 10 May 2025 and the second legs were played on 17 May 2025.

Team 1	Agg.	Team 2	1st leg	2nd leg
Caldiero	0–0	Triestina	0–0	0–0
Pro Patria	1–1	Pro Vercelli	1–0	0–1
Sestri Levante	2–2	Lucchese	2–1	0–1
Milan Futuro	1–2	SPAL	1–0	0–2
Messina	0–1	Foggia	0–0	0–1

== Top goalscorers ==
Rank	Player	Club	Goals
1	(Serbia) Vanja Vlahović^{3}	Atalanta U23	22
2	(Italy) Emanuele Cicerelli	Ternana	19
2	(Italy) Emiliano Pattarello^{1}	Arezzo	19
4	(Italy) Salvatore Caturano	Potenza	18
4	(Argentina) Facundo Lescano	Trapani (12); Avellino (6)	18
4	(Italy) Guglielmo Mignani	Pianese	18
7	(Italy) Gianmario Comi	Pro Vercelli	17
8	(Italy) Mattia Bortolussi	Padova	16
8	(Italy) Michael De Marchi	Virtus Verona	16
8	(Italy) Marco Tumminello^{1}	Crotone	16

Note

^{1} Player scored 1 goal in the play-offs.
^{3} Player scored 3 goals in the play-offs.

== Attendances ==
The top 10 clubs with the highest average home attendance:

#	Club	Average
1	Catania	16,441
2	Vicenza	9,202
3	Avellino	7,476
4	Benevento	5,760
5	Foggia	5,540
6	SPAL	5,528
7	Ternana	4,846
8	Ascoli	4,738
9	Pescara	4,713
10	Trapani	4,486
