= Italy national under-16 football team =

National association football team

Italy
- Association: Italian Football Federation (Federazione Italiana Giuoco Calcio – FIGC)
- Confederation: UEFA (Europe)
- Head coach: Giovanni Costantino
- Most caps: Davide Sinigaglia (14, pre-2001); Lorenzo De Silvestri (18, post 2001)
- Top scorer: Arturo Lupoli (11)
- FIFA code: ITA
| First colours | Second colours |

The Italy national U-16 football team is the national under-16 football team of Italy and is controlled by the Italian Football Federation. The team was known as Italy national under-15 football team prior to 2001, to reflect the age limit at the start of the season instead of the end of the season.

The Italy under-16 football team is a feeder team of the Italy under-17 team.

The under-16 team was known as the under-15 team prior to 2001. Before then, the UEFA European Under-17 Championship was known as UEFA European Under-16 Football Championship (the under-19 Championship was similarly known as the under-18 tournament) due to the name referring to the age limit at the start of a new season. The age limit moved from August to January for the 1997–98 tournament. Since the 2002 Tournament, the age in the name of the tournament has referred to the age limit at the end of the season. The current manager is Daniel Zoratto. They play most their home matches at the Stadio Comunale "Filippo Pirani" in Grottammare, Marche.

== History ==
The team regularly competes in the Montaigu Tournament, winning on two occasions (1999, 2003), finishing runner-up on four occasions (1982, 2000, 2004, 2006), and third place on a further two occasions (1994, 1995).

== Current squad ==
The following players were called up for the 2023 UEFA Under-16 Development Tournament.

Caps and goals as of 20 April 2023, after the match against Hungary.

| No. | Pos. | Player | Date of birth (age) | Caps | Goals | Club |
|---|---|---|---|---|---|---|
| | GK | Alessandro Nunziante | 14 March 2007 (age 19) | 6 | 0 | (Italian Football Federation) Benevento |
| | GK | Massimo Pessina | 25 December 2007 (age 18) | 3 | 0 | (Italian Football Federation) Bologna |
| | DF | Cristian Cama | 5 June 2007 (age 19) | 14 | 0 | (Italian Football Federation) Roma |
| | DF | Federico Colombo | 6 January 2007 (age 19) | 13 | 0 | (Italian Football Federation) Milan |
| | DF | Christian Garofalo | 4 January 2007 (age 19) | 12 | 1 | (Italian Football Federation) Napoli |
| | DF | Mattia Cappelletti | 10 June 2007 (age 19) | 11 | 0 | (Italian Football Federation) Milan |
| | DF | Gianluca Maggiore | 27 June 2007 (age 19) | 8 | 0 | (Italian Football Federation) Atalanta |
| | DF | Lorenzo Biagioni | 9 February 2007 (age 19) | 6 | 0 | (Italian Football Federation) Fiorentina |
| | DF | Francesco Verde | 21 February 2007 (age 19) | 3 | 0 | (Italian Football Federation) Juventus |
| | DF | Raul Zinni | 17 February 2007 (age 19) | 2 | 0 | (Italian Football Federation) Roma |
| | MF | Alessandro Di Nunzio | 21 April 2007 (age 19) | 17 | 3 | (Italian Football Federation) Roma |
| | MF | Alessandro Olivieri | 9 February 2007 (age 19) | 16 | 3 | (Italian Football Federation) Empoli |
| | MF | Niccolò Gariani | 28 March 2007 (age 19) | 16 | 2 | (Italian Football Federation) Atalanta |
| | MF | Diego Pisani | 1 August 2007 (age 19) | 13 | 1 | (Italian Football Federation) Fiorentina |
| | MF | Ernesto Perin | 13 March 2007 (age 19) | 13 | 0 | (Italian Football Federation) Milan |
| | MF | Andrea Orlandi | 24 January 2007 (age 19) | 12 | 4 | (Italian Football Federation) Empoli |
| | MF | Elia Plicco | 1 February 2007 (age 19) | 7 | 0 | (Italian Football Federation) Parma |
| | MF | Matias Mancuso | 15 March 2007 (age 19) | 3 | 0 | (Italian Football Federation) Internazionale |
| | FW | Stefano Maiorana | 14 February 2007 (age 19) | 16 | 3 | (Italian Football Federation) Fiorentina |
| | FW | Mattia Mosconi | 26 March 2007 (age 19) | 12 | 7 | (Italian Football Federation) Internazionale |
| | FW | Francesco Castaldo | 28 April 2007 (age 19) | 10 | 1 | (Italian Football Federation) Bologna |
| | FW | Francesco Camarda | 10 March 2008 (age 18) | 4 | 1 | (Italian Football Federation) Milan |
