= ACD Sant'Angelo 1907 =

Italian football club

Sant'Angelo
- Full name: Associazione Calcio Dilettantistica Sant'Angelo 1907 S.r.l.
- Founded: 1907
- Ground: Stadio Carlo Chiesa, Sant'Angelo Lodigiano, Italy
- Capacity: 4,100
- Chairman: Giuseppe Roveda
- Head coach: Manuele Domenicali
- League: Serie D
- 2025–26: Serie D/D, 11th
Home colours	Away colours

Associazione Calcio Dilettantistica Sant'Angelo 1907, or simply Sant'Angelo, is a football club based in Sant'Angelo Lodigiano, Lombardy, Italy. The club plays in Serie D.

== History ==
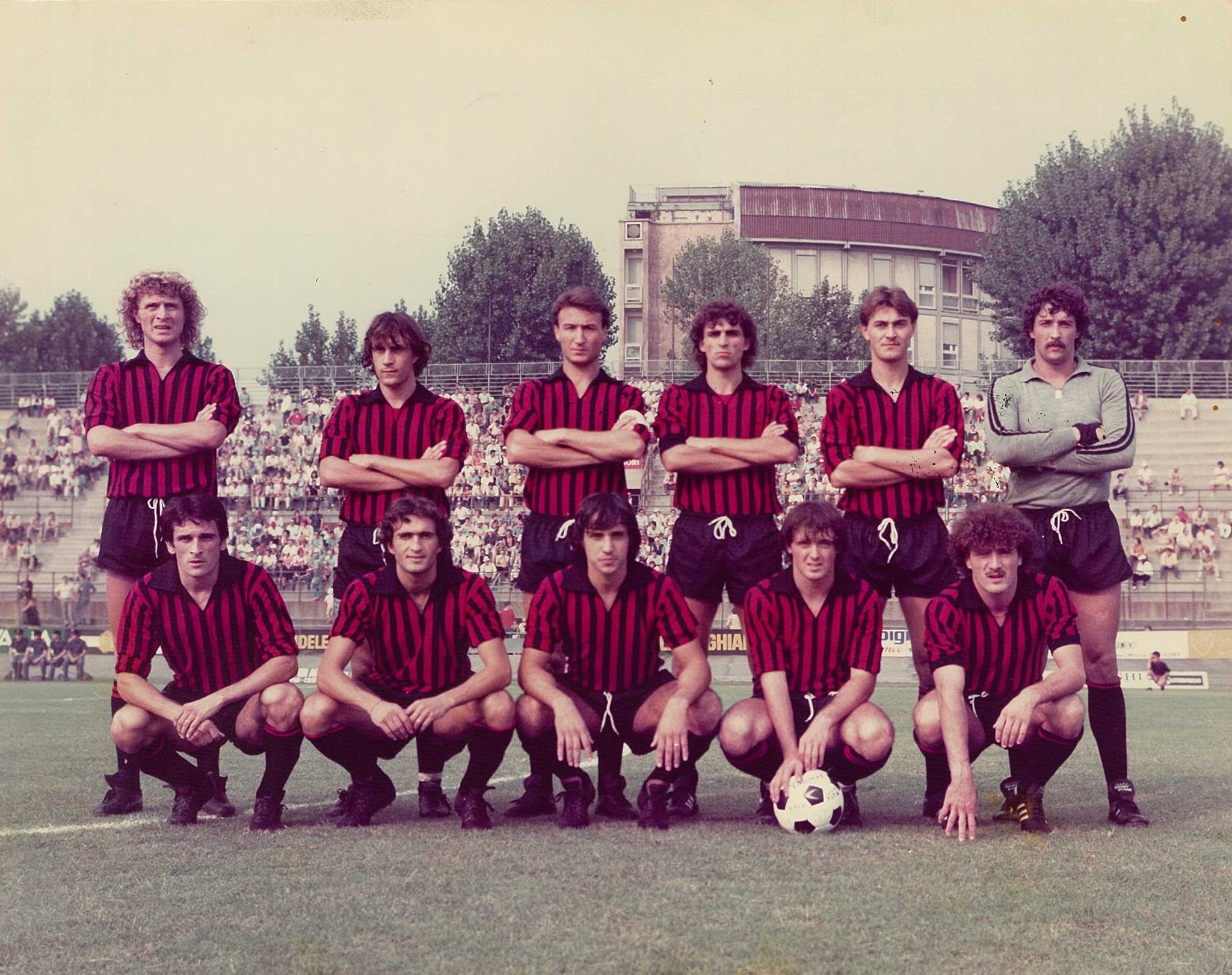

=== Early years ===
The club was founded in 1907, but until the season 1927–28 didn't compete in any official championship.

The debut in a true and actual tournament took place the successive year, when compete in Terza Divisione, finishing fourth. It competes between the Prima, Seconda and Terza Divisione until 1941, when the Second World War compel it to inactivity. It starts again in 1945, from the Serie C, category maintained for a period of three years, then slides in Promozione and in Prima Divisione.

Inactive in 1950–51, returns in Promozione at the conclusion of the season 195–53 and in the Campionato Nazionale Dilettanti in the summer on 1956. The leap, however, costs expensive: in fact, at the conclusion of the year 1960–61 disappears. The society comes refunded two years later and, starting from the Terza Divisione, climbs to Serie D, thanks to four promotions in five years: to the first place in Terza Divisione in 1964 and then another one in the greater series, therefore, after a sixteenth place in Prima Divisione in 1966, finishes in fourth place that gives promotion in Promozione, and a first place in the new division, that opens the doors to Serie D. In the summer of 1968 and the adventure in the Serie D lasts three years: after a fourth and a third place, the demotion arrives in 1971, with a seventeenth place. In 1971 the first squad falls in Promozione, but after two years finishes first. From that year begin the gold years, thanks to the ideas and the funds of an eminent manager, Carlo Chiesa.

=== Serie C and the decline ===
With Carlo Chiesa, the squad reaches the utmost of its popularity: promoted in Serie D at the conclusion of 1972–73, the successive year conquest the second successive promotion, ascending in Serie C.

Between the end of the seventies and the beginning of the eighties, this small town played against teams including Triestina, Piacenza, Monza, Venice, Atalanta, and Udinese.

The miracle, nevertheless, cannot last in eternal, so, after to the slid in Serie C2 (with the reform of the championships) in the summer in 1978, butimmediately returns and succeeds to maintain the Serie C1 until 1981–82, when the last place closes the adventure in Serie C1. After a two-year period in Serie C2, it closed also the cycle in the professional tournaments : the third from last place, in fact, banishes it in Interregionale. From this moment it has continued in the amateur divisions (Serie D, Eccellenza and Promozione).

=== Serie D ===
On 22 April 2012, after the draw (1–1) against the Castellucchio, it was promoted mathematically in Serie D.

== Colors and badge ==
The club colors are red and black.
