= Solbiate Arno =

- Comune
- Comune di Solbiate Arno
- Location within Italy Location within Lombardy
- Coordinates: 45°43′N 8°49′E
- Country: Italy
- Region: Lombardy
- Province: Province of Varese (VA)

Area
  - Total: 3.0 km^{2} (1.2 sq mi)

Population (Dec. 2004)
  - Total: 4,157
  - Density: 1,400/km^{2} (3,600/sq mi)
- Demonym: Solbiatesi
- Time zone: UTC+1 (CET)
  - Summer (DST): UTC+2 (CEST)
- Postal code: 21048
- Dialing code: 0331

Solbiate Arno is a comune (municipality) in the Province of Varese in the Italian region Lombardy, located about 40 km (25 mi) northwest of Milan and about 11 km (6.8 mi) south of Varese. As of 31 December 2004, it had a population of 4,157 and an area of 3.0 km^{2} (1.2 sq mi).

Solbiate Arno borders the following municipalities: Albizzate, Carnago, Caronno Varesino, Jerago con Orago, Oggiona con Santo Stefano.

It is served by Albizzate-Solbiate Arno railway station.

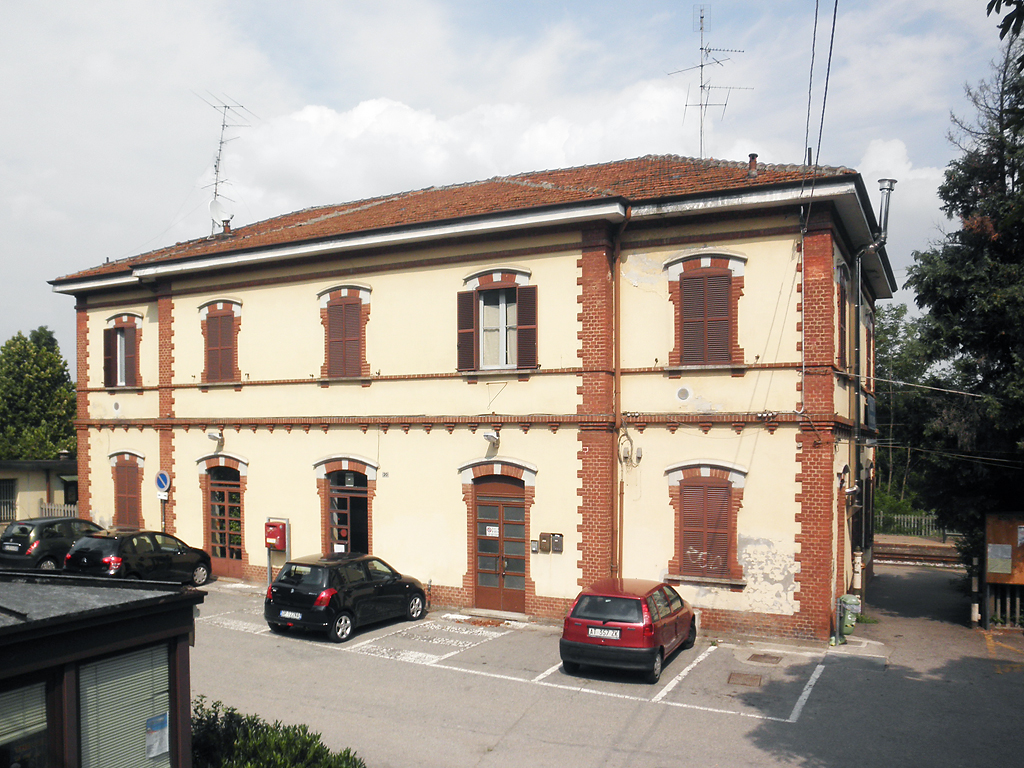

== Demographic evolution ==
Historical population

Year	Pop.	±%
1861	797	—
1871	830	+4.1%
1881	904	+8.9%
1901	910	+0.7%
1911	1,080	+18.7%

Year	Pop.	±%
1921	1,206	+11.7%
1931	1,445	+19.8%
1936	1,469	+1.7%
1951	1,921	+30.8%
1961	2,498	+30.0%

Year	Pop.	±%
1971	3,288	+31.6%
1981	3,522	+7.1%
1991	4,057	+15.2%
2001	4,027	−0.7%

Source: Data from ISTAT
