= 2026–27 Serie D =

Serie D
- Season: 2026–27

The 2026–27 Serie D is the seventy-ninth season of the top-level Italian non-professional football championship, the forty-fifth edition under the lordship of the Lega Nazionale Dilettanti. It represents the fourth tier in the Italian football league system.

== Rules ==
The season provides a total of nine promotions to Serie C (the winners of all nine groups). Teams placed between second and fifth for each group will play a so-called "playoff tournament," starting with two one-legged games played at the best-placed team's home venue:

- 2nd-placed team vs 5th-placed team;
- 3rd-placed team vs 4th-placed team.

In the event of a draw at the end of the game, two extra periods will be played. If no winner is determined after that, the best-placed team will advance to the final.

The two winning teams will then play a one-legged final, to be hosted at the best-placed team's home venue, with the same rules as in the first round. The playoff winners will be prioritized to fill a potential Serie C league vacancy.

The two bottom-placed teams for each league group are automatically relegated to Eccellenza. Two two-legged relegation playoff games (known in Italian as "play-out") will therefore be played between:

- 13th-placed team vs 16th-placed team (for 18-team groups), or 15th-placed team vs 18th-placed team (for 20-team groups);
- 14th-placed team vs 15th-placed team (for 18-team groups), or 16th-placed team vs 17th-placed team (for 20-team groups).

Two extra times will be played in case of an aggregate draw after the second leg. If a further aggregate draw occurs, the team with the worst record will be relegated.

In case the two teams have a league gap of at least eight points, the relegation playoff will not take place and the worst-placed club will be automatically relegated instead.

== Teams ==
The league's composition involves nine divisions, grouped geographically and named alphabetically.

Relegated from Serie C

- Virtus Verona
- Pro Patria
- Triestina
- Bra
- Pontedera
- Siracusa
- Trapani

=== Exclusions ===
The regulations would have involved interchanging nine clubs between Serie C and Serie D. However, due to Rimini not completing their season and Ternana Calcio renouncing their Serie C spot due to major financial issues, two league spots were consequently vacated.

=== Teams promoted from Eccellenza ===
The following teams were promoted from Eccellenza:

Abruzzo

- Lanciano
- Santegidiese^{[PO]}

Apulia

- Brindisi
- Bisceglie^{[CI]}

Basilicata

- Melfi

Calabria

- PraiaTortora

Campania

- Real Forio
- Ebolitana
- Gladiator^{[PO]}

Emilia-Romagna

- Nibbiano & Valtidone
- Mezzolara

Friuli-Venezia Giulia

- Lavarian Mortean Esperia

Lazio

- Aranova
- Anagni
- Certosa^{[PO]}

Liguria

- Millesimo
- Fezzanese^{[PO]}

Lombardy

- Arconatese
- Tritium
- Pavonese
- Solbiatese^{[PO]}

Marche

- Montecchio Gallo

Molise

- Venafro

Piedmont & Aosta Valley

- Borgosesia
- Alessandria
- Lascaris^{[PO]}

Sardinia

- Ossese

Sicily

- Licata
- Modica
- Avola^{[PO]}

Trentino Alto Adige – Südtirol

- Virtus Bolzano

Tuscany

- Lucchese
- Rondinella Marzocco

Umbria

- Angelana
- Pietralunghese^{[PO]}

Veneto

- Schio
- Sandonà

^{PO} Promoted as national playoff winners. ^{CI} Promoted as Coppa Italia Dilettanti champions.

== Group A ==
| Pos | Team | Pld | W | D | L | GF | GA | GD | Pts | Promotion, qualification or relegation |
|---|---|---|---|---|---|---|---|---|---|---|
| 1 | Alessandria | 12 | 11 | 0 | 1 | 24 | 11 | +13 | 33 | Promotion to Serie C (Note: If two or more teams finish tied on points at the top of the league, once the tie-breaking criteria have applied, the 1st and the 2nd-placed teams play a tie-breaker, whose winner gets promotion to Serie C.) |
| 2 | Biellese | 12 | 7 | 3 | 2 | 25 | 13 | +12 | 24 | Qualification for wild card playoffs (Note: Winning playoffs does not grant promotion to Serie C, but a chance to get promoted in case of vacancies.) |
| 3 | Chisola | 12 | 6 | 4 | 2 | 25 | 13 | +12 | 22 | Qualification for wild card playoffs |
| 4 | Ligorna | 12 | 5 | 4 | 3 | 18 | 13 | +5 | 19 | Qualification for wild card playoffs |
| 5 | Derthona | 12 | 5 | 4 | 3 | 17 | 17 | 0 | 19 | Qualification for wild card playoffs |
| 6 | Millesimo | 12 | 5 | 2 | 5 | 17 | 13 | +4 | 17 | |
| 7 | Sanremese | 12 | 4 | 5 | 3 | 16 | 13 | +3 | 17 | |
| 8 | Gozzano | 12 | 5 | 2 | 5 | 15 | 17 | −2 | 17 | |
| 9 | Imperia | 12 | 4 | 4 | 4 | 14 | 13 | +1 | 16 | |
| 10 | Saluzzo | 12 | 3 | 6 | 3 | 11 | 11 | 0 | 15 | |
| 11 | Borgosesia | 12 | 3 | 5 | 4 | 15 | 17 | −2 | 14 | |
| 12 | Sestri Levante | 12 | 3 | 5 | 4 | 10 | 12 | −2 | 14 | |
| 13 | Asti | 12 | 4 | 2 | 6 | 13 | 17 | −4 | 14 | Qualification for relegation playoffs (Note: If the 13th-placed team finishes nine or more points ahead of the 16th-placed team, then the relegation playoff is not played, and the 16th-placed team is relegated to Eccellenza directly. If the 14th-placed team finishes nine or more points ahead of the 15th-placed team, the relegation playoff is not played, and the 15th-placed team is relegated directly to Eccellenza.) |
| 14 | Fezzanese | 12 | 4 | 2 | 6 | 11 | 17 | −6 | 14 | Qualification for relegation playoffs |
| 15 | Lascaris | 12 | 3 | 4 | 5 | 12 | 17 | −5 | 13 | Qualification for relegation playoffs |
| 16 | Bra | 12 | 2 | 4 | 6 | 10 | 19 | −9 | 10 | Qualification for relegation playoffs |
| 17 | Valenzana Mado | 12 | 2 | 3 | 7 | 12 | 19 | −7 | 9 | Relegation to Eccellenza |
| 18 | Celle Varazze | 12 | 2 | 1 | 9 | 7 | 20 | −13 | 7 | Relegation to Eccellenza |

Updated to match(es) played on 19 November 2026. Source:
Rules for classification: (Note: 1) Points; 2) Head-to-head points; 3) Head-to-head goal difference; 4) Goal difference; 5) Goals scored; 6) Draw.)

== Group B ==
| Pos | Team | Pld | W | D | L | GF | GA | GD | Pts | Promotion, qualification or relegation |
|---|---|---|---|---|---|---|---|---|---|---|
| 1 | ChievoVerona | 12 | 8 | 2 | 2 | 27 | 11 | +16 | 26 | Promotion to Serie C |
| 2 | Nibbiano & Valtidone | 12 | 8 | 2 | 2 | 16 | 7 | +9 | 26 | Qualification for wild card playoffs |
| 3 | Piacenza | 12 | 7 | 3 | 2 | 23 | 11 | +12 | 24 | Qualification for wild card playoffs |
| 4 | Milan Futuro | 11 | 7 | 2 | 2 | 21 | 15 | +6 | 23 | Qualification for wild card playoffs |
| 5 | Leon | 11 | 6 | 3 | 2 | 19 | 13 | +6 | 21 | Qualification for wild card playoffs |
| 6 | Caldiero Terme | 12 | 6 | 3 | 3 | 19 | 15 | +4 | 21 | |
| 7 | Villa Valle | 12 | 4 | 6 | 2 | 15 | 10 | +5 | 18 | |
| 8 | Scanzorosciate | 12 | 4 | 5 | 3 | 14 | 13 | +1 | 17 | |
| 9 | Pavonese | 12 | 4 | 5 | 3 | 14 | 15 | −1 | 17 | |
| 10 | Virtus Verona | 12 | 4 | 3 | 5 | 15 | 18 | −3 | 15 | |
| 11 | Pro Palazzolo | 12 | 4 | 3 | 5 | 12 | 17 | −5 | 15 | |
| 12 | Real Calepina | 12 | 3 | 4 | 5 | 16 | 23 | −7 | 13 | |
| 13 | Club Milano | 12 | 3 | 2 | 7 | 10 | 15 | −5 | 11 | Qualification for relegation playoffs |
| 14 | Rovato | 12 | 2 | 4 | 6 | 18 | 23 | −5 | 10 | Qualification for relegation playoffs |
| 15 | Virtus CiseranoBergamo | 12 | 2 | 4 | 6 | 11 | 17 | −6 | 10 | Qualification for relegation playoffs |
| 16 | Brusaporto | 12 | 3 | 1 | 8 | 9 | 19 | −10 | 10 | Qualification for relegation playoffs |
| 17 | Tritium | 12 | 2 | 3 | 7 | 14 | 21 | −7 | 9 | Relegation to Eccellenza |
| 18 | Fiorenzuola | 12 | 1 | 3 | 8 | 8 | 18 | −10 | 6 | Relegation to Eccellenza |

Updated to match(es) played on 19 November 2026. Source:
Rules for classification:

== Group C ==
| Pos | Team | Pld | W | D | L | GF | GA | GD | Pts | Promotion, qualification or relegation |
|---|---|---|---|---|---|---|---|---|---|---|
| 1 | Cjarlins Muzane | 12 | 9 | 1 | 2 | 25 | 11 | +14 | 28 | Promotion to Serie C |
| 2 | Union Clodiense Chioggia | 12 | 6 | 4 | 2 | 18 | 14 | +4 | 22 | Qualification for wild card playoffs |
| 3 | Luparense | 12 | 5 | 6 | 1 | 17 | 6 | +11 | 21 | Qualification for wild card playoffs |
| 4 | Sandonà | 12 | 5 | 5 | 2 | 13 | 8 | +5 | 20 | Qualification for wild card playoffs |
| 5 | Campodarsego | 12 | 5 | 4 | 3 | 21 | 18 | +3 | 19 | Qualification for wild card playoffs |
| 6 | Mestre | 12 | 4 | 6 | 2 | 15 | 11 | +4 | 18 | |
| 7 | Conegliano | 12 | 5 | 3 | 4 | 11 | 12 | −1 | 18 | |
| 8 | Legnago Salus | 12 | 4 | 5 | 3 | 17 | 14 | +3 | 17 | |
| 9 | Bassano | 12 | 4 | 5 | 3 | 10 | 9 | +1 | 17 | |
| 10 | Este | 12 | 5 | 2 | 5 | 9 | 8 | +1 | 17 | |
| 11 | Triestina | 12 | 3 | 5 | 4 | 11 | 14 | −3 | 14 | |
| 12 | Maia Alta Obermais | 12 | 3 | 4 | 5 | 15 | 18 | −3 | 13 | |
| 13 | Calvi Noale | 12 | 3 | 4 | 5 | 13 | 16 | −3 | 13 | Qualification for relegation playoffs |
| 14 | LME | 12 | 3 | 4 | 5 | 12 | 18 | −6 | 13 | Qualification for relegation playoffs |
| 15 | Unione La Rocca Altavilla | 12 | 2 | 5 | 5 | 19 | 15 | +4 | 11 | Qualification for relegation playoffs |
| 16 | Schio | 12 | 2 | 5 | 5 | 12 | 15 | −3 | 11 | Qualification for relegation playoffs |
| 17 | Virtus Bolzano | 12 | 3 | 2 | 7 | 13 | 31 | −18 | 11 | Relegation to Eccellenza |
| 18 | Brian Lignano | 12 | 1 | 2 | 9 | 10 | 23 | −13 | 5 | Relegation to Eccellenza |

Updated to match(es) played on 15 November 2026. Source:
Rules for classification:

== Group D ==
| Pos | Team | Pld | W | D | L | GF | GA | GD | Pts | Promotion, qualification or relegation |
|---|---|---|---|---|---|---|---|---|---|---|
| 1 | Pistoiese | 11 | 9 | 1 | 1 | 24 | 5 | +19 | 28 | Promotion to Serie C |
| 2 | Pro Patria | 12 | 7 | 3 | 2 | 15 | 7 | +8 | 24 | Qualification for wild card playoffs |
| 3 | Lentigione | 12 | 7 | 3 | 2 | 20 | 13 | +7 | 24 | Qualification for wild card playoffs |
| 4 | Casatese Merate | 12 | 7 | 1 | 4 | 16 | 14 | +2 | 22 | Qualification for wild card playoffs |
| 5 | Castellanzese | 12 | 6 | 1 | 5 | 19 | 12 | +7 | 19 | Qualification for wild card playoffs |
| 6 | Pro Sesto | 12 | 5 | 3 | 4 | 23 | 14 | +9 | 18 | |
| 7 | Sant'Angelo | 12 | 5 | 3 | 4 | 17 | 13 | +4 | 18 | |
| 8 | Cittadella Modena | 12 | 5 | 3 | 4 | 13 | 10 | +3 | 18 | |
| 9 | Solbiatese | 12 | 4 | 6 | 2 | 13 | 11 | +2 | 18 | |
| 10 | Crema | 12 | 5 | 3 | 4 | 15 | 17 | −2 | 18 | |
| 11 | Pavia | 12 | 4 | 5 | 3 | 15 | 9 | +6 | 17 | |
| 12 | Correggese | 12 | 4 | 3 | 5 | 15 | 21 | −6 | 15 | |
| 13 | Varese | 12 | 3 | 5 | 4 | 17 | 14 | +3 | 14 | Qualification for relegation playoffs |
| 14 | Varesina | 12 | 3 | 5 | 4 | 17 | 17 | 0 | 14 | Qualification for relegation playoffs |
| 15 | Tropical Coriano | 11 | 2 | 3 | 6 | 10 | 15 | −5 | 9 | Qualification for relegation playoffs |
| 16 | Pontedera | 12 | 2 | 1 | 9 | 12 | 30 | −18 | 7 | Qualification for relegation playoffs |
| 17 | Arconatese | 12 | 1 | 3 | 8 | 11 | 27 | −16 | 6 | Relegation to Eccellenza |
| 18 | Oltrepò | 12 | 1 | 2 | 9 | 5 | 28 | −23 | 5 | Relegation to Eccellenza |

Updated to match(es) played on 19 November 2026. Source:
Rules for classification:

== Group E ==
| Pos | Team | Pld | W | D | L | GF | GA | GD | Pts | Promotion, qualification or relegation |
|---|---|---|---|---|---|---|---|---|---|---|
| 1 | Prato | 12 | 8 | 4 | 0 | 21 | 7 | +14 | 28 | Promotion to Serie C |
| 2 | Nuova Ternana | 12 | 7 | 3 | 2 | 23 | 9 | +14 | 24 | Qualification for wild card playoffs |
| 3 | Siena | 12 | 7 | 1 | 4 | 24 | 11 | +13 | 22 | Qualification for wild card playoffs |
| 4 | Follonica Gavorrano | 12 | 5 | 7 | 0 | 17 | 10 | +7 | 22 | Qualification for wild card playoffs |
| 5 | Lucchese | 12 | 5 | 4 | 3 | 23 | 20 | +3 | 19 | Qualification for wild card playoffs |
| 6 | Aquila Montevarchi | 12 | 6 | 1 | 5 | 17 | 14 | +3 | 19 | |
| 7 | Flaminia Civitacastellana | 12 | 5 | 4 | 3 | 15 | 14 | +1 | 19 | |
| 8 | Terranuova Traiana | 12 | 4 | 6 | 2 | 18 | 14 | +4 | 18 | |
| 9 | San Donato Tavarnelle | 12 | 5 | 2 | 5 | 12 | 13 | −1 | 17 | |
| 10 | Tau Calcio Altopascio | 12 | 5 | 2 | 5 | 13 | 18 | −5 | 17 | |
| 11 | Seravezza Pozzi | 12 | 4 | 4 | 4 | 18 | 13 | +5 | 16 | |
| 12 | Scandicci | 12 | 4 | 4 | 4 | 20 | 17 | +3 | 16 | |
| 13 | Sasso Marconi | 12 | 3 | 3 | 6 | 17 | 19 | −2 | 12 | Qualification for relegation playoffs |
| 14 | Mezzolara | 12 | 1 | 9 | 2 | 11 | 17 | −6 | 12 | Qualification for relegation playoffs |
| 15 | Rondinella Marzocco | 12 | 2 | 5 | 5 | 8 | 16 | −8 | 11 | Qualification for relegation playoffs |
| 16 | Grassina | 12 | 1 | 5 | 6 | 10 | 21 | −11 | 8 | Qualification for relegation playoffs |
| 17 | Progresso | 12 | 2 | 1 | 9 | 8 | 24 | −16 | 7 | Relegation to Eccellenza |
| 18 | Ghiviborgo | 12 | 0 | 3 | 9 | 9 | 27 | −18 | 3 | Relegation to Eccellenza |

Updated to match(es) played on 19 November 2026. Source:
Rules for classification:

== Group F ==
| Pos | Team | Pld | W | D | L | GF | GA | GD | Pts | Promotion, qualification or relegation |
|---|---|---|---|---|---|---|---|---|---|---|
| 1 | Teramo | 12 | 9 | 2 | 1 | 30 | 15 | +15 | 29 | Promotion to Serie C |
| 2 | L'Aquila | 12 | 8 | 4 | 0 | 22 | 8 | +14 | 28 | Qualification for wild card playoffs |
| 3 | Foligno | 12 | 7 | 2 | 3 | 16 | 12 | +4 | 23 | Qualification for wild card playoffs |
| 4 | Ancona | 12 | 6 | 4 | 2 | 20 | 10 | +10 | 22 | Qualification for wild card playoffs |
| 5 | Vigor Senigallia | 12 | 7 | 1 | 4 | 22 | 22 | 0 | 22 | Qualification for wild card playoffs |
| 6 | San Nicolò Notaresco | 12 | 5 | 4 | 3 | 14 | 11 | +3 | 19 | |
| 7 | Atletico Ascoli | 12 | 5 | 3 | 4 | 16 | 13 | +3 | 18 | |
| 8 | Fossombrone | 12 | 5 | 3 | 4 | 17 | 19 | −2 | 18 | |
| 9 | Montecchio Gallo | 12 | 4 | 4 | 4 | 15 | 13 | +2 | 16 | |
| 10 | Giulianova | 12 | 5 | 1 | 6 | 14 | 15 | −1 | 16 | |
| 11 | Maceratese | 12 | 4 | 3 | 5 | 15 | 18 | −3 | 15 | |
| 12 | Termoli | 12 | 3 | 4 | 5 | 7 | 9 | −2 | 13 | |
| 13 | Lanciano | 12 | 3 | 4 | 5 | 16 | 19 | −3 | 13 | |
| 14 | Sporting Trestina | 12 | 3 | 2 | 7 | 8 | 16 | −8 | 11 | Qualification for relegation playoffs |
| 15 | Recanatese | 12 | 2 | 4 | 6 | 13 | 18 | −5 | 10 | Qualification for relegation playoffs |
| 16 | Pietralunghese | 12 | 2 | 3 | 7 | 7 | 14 | −7 | 9 | Qualification for relegation playoffs |
| 17 | Santegidiese | 12 | 2 | 3 | 7 | 10 | 20 | −10 | 9 | Relegation to Eccellenza |
| 18 | Angelana | 12 | 2 | 1 | 9 | 7 | 17 | −10 | 7 | Relegation to Eccellenza |

Updated to match(es) played on 19 November 2026. Source:
Rules for classification:

== Group G ==
| Pos | Team | Pld | W | D | L | GF | GA | GD | Pts | Promotion, qualification or relegation |
|---|---|---|---|---|---|---|---|---|---|---|
| 1 | Sarnese | 12 | 9 | 2 | 1 | 23 | 10 | +13 | 29 | Promotion to Serie C |
| 2 | Trastevere | 12 | 6 | 4 | 2 | 20 | 20 | 0 | 22 | Qualification for wild card playoffs |
| 3 | Monastir | 12 | 6 | 2 | 4 | 29 | 24 | +5 | 20 | Qualification for wild card playoffs |
| 4 | Albalonga | 12 | 4 | 6 | 2 | 18 | 14 | +4 | 18 | Qualification for wild card playoffs |
| 5 | Vigor Campagnano | 12 | 5 | 3 | 4 | 16 | 13 | +3 | 18 | Qualification for wild card playoffs |
| 6 | UniPomezia | 12 | 4 | 5 | 3 | 20 | 16 | +4 | 17 | |
| 7 | Ossese | 12 | 4 | 5 | 3 | 18 | 16 | +2 | 17 | |
| 8 | Anzio | 12 | 4 | 4 | 4 | 11 | 10 | +1 | 16 | |
| 9 | Venafro | 12 | 4 | 4 | 4 | 11 | 13 | −2 | 16 | |
| 10 | Paganese | 12 | 4 | 3 | 5 | 20 | 16 | +4 | 15 | |
| 11 | Afragolese | 12 | 3 | 6 | 3 | 13 | 10 | +3 | 15 | |
| 12 | Aranova | 12 | 4 | 3 | 5 | 16 | 18 | −2 | 15 | |
| 13 | Anagni | 12 | 4 | 2 | 6 | 16 | 20 | −4 | 14 | Qualification for relegation playoffs |
| 14 | Budoni | 12 | 4 | 2 | 6 | 20 | 26 | −6 | 14 | Qualification for relegation playoffs |
| 15 | Gelbison | 12 | 4 | 2 | 6 | 13 | 20 | −7 | 14 | Qualification for relegation playoffs |
| 16 | Latte Dolce | 12 | 3 | 4 | 5 | 15 | 19 | −4 | 13 | Qualification for relegation playoffs |
| 17 | COS Sarrabus Ogliastra | 12 | 3 | 3 | 6 | 12 | 15 | −3 | 12 | Relegation to Eccellenza |
| 18 | Atletico Lodigiani | 12 | 1 | 4 | 7 | 14 | 25 | −11 | 7 | Relegation to Eccellenza |

Updated to match(es) played on 19 November 2026. Source:
Rules for classification:

== Group H ==
| Pos | Team | Pld | W | D | L | GF | GA | GD | Pts | Promotion, qualification or relegation |
|---|---|---|---|---|---|---|---|---|---|---|
| 1 | Virtus Francavilla | 12 | 9 | 0 | 3 | 21 | 13 | +8 | 27 | Promotion to Serie C |
| 2 | Gravina | 12 | 6 | 5 | 1 | 21 | 12 | +9 | 23 | Wild card playoffs |
| 3 | Martina | 12 | 7 | 1 | 4 | 21 | 13 | +8 | 22 | Wild card playoffs |
| 4 | Turris | 12 | 6 | 4 | 2 | 18 | 12 | +6 | 22 | Wild card playoffs |
| 5 | Brindisi | 12 | 7 | 1 | 4 | 17 | 11 | +6 | 22 | Wild card playoffs |
| 6 | Gladiator | 12 | 6 | 3 | 3 | 20 | 18 | +2 | 21 | |
| 7 | Fidelis Andria | 12 | 6 | 2 | 4 | 15 | 13 | +2 | 20 | |
| 8 | Manfredonia | 12 | 5 | 3 | 4 | 16 | 15 | +1 | 18 | |
| 9 | Palmese | 12 | 5 | 2 | 5 | 22 | 20 | +2 | 17 | |
| 10 | Real Aversa | 12 | 4 | 5 | 3 | 17 | 17 | 0 | 17 | |
| 11 | Bisceglie | 12 | 5 | 0 | 7 | 16 | 18 | −2 | 15 | |
| 12 | Melfi | 12 | 4 | 2 | 6 | 9 | 16 | −7 | 14 | |
| 13 | Nocerina | 12 | 4 | 1 | 7 | 15 | 18 | −3 | 13 | Qualification for relegation playoffs |
| 14 | Real Forio | 12 | 3 | 3 | 6 | 17 | 20 | −3 | 12 | Qualification for relegation playoffs |
| 15 | Ischia | 12 | 2 | 4 | 6 | 14 | 18 | −4 | 10 | Qualification for relegation playoffs |
| 16 | Ebolitana | 12 | 2 | 4 | 6 | 8 | 17 | −9 | 10 | Qualification for relegation playoffs |
| 17 | Francavilla | 12 | 2 | 2 | 8 | 7 | 14 | −7 | 8 | Relegation to Eccellenza |
| 18 | Nardò (Note: 2 point deducted due to financial irregularities.) | 12 | 2 | 4 | 6 | 13 | 22 | −9 | 8 | Relegation to Eccellenza |

Updated to match(es) played on 19 November 2026. Source:
Rules for classification:

== Group I ==
| Pos | Team | Pld | W | D | L | GF | GA | GD | Pts | Promotion, qualification or relegation |
|---|---|---|---|---|---|---|---|---|---|---|
| 1 | Reggina | 12 | 9 | 2 | 1 | 31 | 9 | +22 | 29 | Promotion to Serie C |
| 2 | Vibonese | 12 | 8 | 3 | 1 | 28 | 10 | +18 | 27 | Qualification for wild card playoffs |
| 3 | Sambiase | 12 | 8 | 2 | 2 | 21 | 11 | +10 | 26 | Qualification for wild card playoffs |
| 4 | Avola | 12 | 6 | 2 | 4 | 18 | 17 | +1 | 20 | Qualification for wild card playoffs |
| 5 | PraiaTortora | 12 | 5 | 4 | 3 | 17 | 11 | +6 | 19 | Qualification for wild card playoffs |
| 6 | Nuova Igea Virtus | 12 | 5 | 4 | 3 | 27 | 24 | +3 | 19 | |
| 7 | Milazzo | 12 | 6 | 1 | 5 | 14 | 15 | −1 | 19 | |
| 8 | Licata | 12 | 5 | 2 | 5 | 13 | 22 | −9 | 17 | |
| 9 | Città di Gela (Note: 1 point deducted due to financial irregularities.) | 12 | 4 | 5 | 3 | 13 | 9 | +4 | 16 | |
| 10 | Siracusa (Note: 7 points deducted due to financial irregularities.) | 12 | 6 | 4 | 2 | 20 | 12 | +8 | 15 | |
| 11 | Nissa | 12 | 4 | 3 | 5 | 19 | 15 | +4 | 15 | |
| 12 | Athletic Club Palermo | 12 | 4 | 3 | 5 | 16 | 17 | −1 | 15 | |
| 13 | Modica | 12 | 4 | 1 | 7 | 14 | 17 | −3 | 13 | Qualification for relegation playoffs |
| 14 | Trapani (Note: 5 points deducted due to financial irregularities.) | 12 | 4 | 3 | 5 | 12 | 17 | −5 | 10 | Qualification for relegation playoffs |
| 15 | Vigor Lamezia | 12 | 2 | 3 | 7 | 11 | 21 | −10 | 9 | Qualification for relegation playoffs |
| 16 | CastrumFavara | 12 | 2 | 2 | 8 | 12 | 20 | −8 | 8 | Qualification for relegation playoffs |
| 17 | Ragusa | 12 | 1 | 3 | 8 | 10 | 23 | −13 | 6 | Relegation to Eccellenza |
| 18 | Enna | 12 | 0 | 3 | 9 | 4 | 30 | −26 | 3 | Relegation to Eccellenza |

Updated to match(es) played on 19 November 2026. Source:
Rules for classification:
