= 2025–26 Serie D =

Serie D
- Season: 2025–26
- Promoted: Vado; Folgore Caratese; Treviso; Desenzano; Grosseto; Ostia Mare; Scafatese; Barletta; Savoia
- Relegated: Cairese; Derthona; Lavagnese; NovaRomentin; Breno; Castellanzese; Sondrio; Vogherese; San Luigi; Vigasio; Adriese; Portogruaro; Imolese; Tropical Coriano; Trevigliese; Tuttocuoio; Camaiore; Poggibonsi; Cannara; Sansepolcro; Chieti; San Marino; Castelfidardo; Sammaurese; Olbia; Real Monterotondo; Cassino; Montespaccato; Heraclea; Pompei; Acerrana; Ferrandina; Acireale; Messina; Paternò; Sancataldese

The 2025–26 Serie D is the seventy-eighth season of the top-level Italian non-professional football championship. It represents the fourth tier in the Italian football league system.

== Rules ==
The season will provide a total of nine promotions to Serie C (those being the winners of all nine groups). Teams placed between second and fifth for each group will play a so-called "playoff tournament," starting with two one-legged games played at the best-placed team's home venue:

- 2nd-placed team vs 5th-placed team;
- 3rd-placed team vs 4th-placed team.

In the event of a draw at the end of the game, two extra periods will be played. If no winner is determined after that, the team with the best placement will advance to the final.

The two winning teams will then play a one-legged final, to be hosted at the best-placed team's home venue, with the same rules as in the first round. The playoff winners will be prioritized to fill a potential Serie C league vacancy.

The two bottom-placed teams for each league group are automatically relegated to Eccellenza. Two two-legged relegation playoff games (known in Italian as "play-out") will therefore be played between:

- 13th-placed team vs 16th-placed team (for 18-team groups), or 15th-placed team vs 18th-placed team (for 20-team groups);
- 14th-placed team vs 15th-placed team (for 18-team groups), or 16th-placed team vs 17th-placed team (for 20-team groups).

Two extra times will be played in case of an aggregate draw after the second leg. If a further aggregate draw occurs, the team with the worst record will be relegated.

In case the two teams have a league gap of at least eight points, the relegation playoff will not take place and the worst-placed club will be automatically relegated instead.

== Teams ==
The league's composition involves nine divisions, grouped geographically and named alphabetically.

=== Teams relegated from Serie C ===
The following teams were relegated from the 2024–25 Serie C:

- From Group A: Union Clodiense Chioggia, Caldiero Terme
- From Group B: Milan Futuro, Sestri Levante, Legnago Salus
- From Group C: Messina

Three clubs originally relegated from Serie C (Taranto, Turris, and Lucchese) went bankrupt and were subsequently disbanded. The number of clubs in Serie D decreased from 168 to 165 to achieve the objective of 160 teams in eight groups for the 2026–27 season. Article 52 of NOIF regulations was consequently amended to ban the recreation of bankrupted clubs in this league, moving them to the lower fully amateur divisions instead.

In addition, SPAL submitted an incomplete and invalid application to the league, and was subsequently excluded, replaced by the playoff-winning team Ravenna. Consequently, the number of clubs in Serie D decreased from 165 to 164.

=== Teams promoted from Eccellenza ===
The following teams were promoted from Eccellenza:

Abruzzo

- Giulianova
- Castelnuovo Vomano^{[PO]}^{[EX]}

Apulia

- Barletta

Basilicata

- Ferrandina

Calabria

- Vigor Lamezia

Campania

- Afragolese
- Heraclea
- Real Normanna^{[PO]}

Emilia Romagna

- Correggese
- Tropical Coriano

Friuli-Venezia Giulia

- San Luigi

Lazio

- Valmontone
- UniPomezia
- Montespaccato^{[RE]}

Liguria

- Celle Varazze

Lombardy

- Pavia
- Mapello
- Rovato Vertovese
- Leon^{[PO]}
- Scanzorosciate^{[PO]}

Marche

- Maceratese

Molise

- Vastogirardi^{[EX]}

Piedmont & Aosta Valley

- Biellese
- Valenzana Mado

Sardinia

- Budoni
- Monastir^{[PO]}

Sicily

- Athletic Club Palermo
- Milazzo
- Città di Gela^{[PO]}

Trentino Alto Adige – Südtirol

- Maia Alta Obermais

Tuscany

- Camaiore
- Scandicci

Umbria

- Vivi Altotevere Sansepolcro
- Cannara^{[PO]}

Veneto

- Unione La Rocca Altavilla
- Conegliano

^{EX} Originally promoted, successively excluded. ^{PO} Promoted as national playoff winners. ^{RE} Admitted as repechage to fill a vacancy.

As usual, there was an interchange of 36 clubs between Serie D and Eccellenza. However, as both the winners, finalists, and semifinalists of the Coppa Italia Dilettanti had already won promotion to Serie D, they were not eligible for the additional spot commonly assigned to the tournament.

The spot was consequently vacated, reducing the number of clubs from 164 to 163 teams. Moreover, the Eccellenza Molise winners, Vastogirardi, did not apply for a Serie D spot, thus reducing the number to 162, the standard membership for this season. Successively, due to financial issues, three more clubs were rejected, Matera, Avezzano, and Eccellenza's playoff winners Castelnuovo Vomano, and they were replaced by:

- two Serie D's playouts losers (as expected Follonica Gavorrano and COS Orientale Sarda);
- the best Eccellenza's playoff losers (as expected Montespaccato Rome).

=== Relocations, mergers and renamings ===
- Città di Varese was renamed to Varese;
- Cynthialbalonga was renamed to Albalonga, renouncing the joint representation of Albano Laziale and Genzano di Roma in order to represent only the former city.
- Nola replaced Puteolana, acquiring the sports rights of the latter.

== Group A ==
Pos	Team	Pld	W	D	L	GF	GA	GD	Pts	Promotion, qualification or relegation
1	Vado (C, P)	33	23	6	4	66	22	+44	75	Promotion to Serie C (Note: If two or more teams finish tied on points at the top of the league, once the tie-breaking criteria have applied, the 1st and the 2nd-placed teams play a tie-breaker, whose winner gets promotion to Serie C.)
2	Ligorna (Q)	33	20	9	4	55	25	+30	69	Qualification for wild card playoffs (Note: Winning playoffs does not grant promotion to Serie C, but a chance to get promoted in case of vacancies.)
3	Biellese (Q)	33	16	9	8	46	26	+20	57	Qualification for wild card playoffs
4	Sestri Levante	33	15	9	9	54	32	+22	54	Qualification for wild card playoffs
5	Varese	33	15	8	10	40	41	−1	53	Qualification for wild card playoffs
6	Chisola	33	15	7	11	41	34	+7	52	
7	Sanremese	33	12	10	11	35	30	+5	46	
8	Valenzana Mado	33	12	9	12	31	45	−14	45	
9	Saluzzo	33	11	9	13	47	43	+4	42	
10	Celle Varazze	33	11	8	14	40	47	−7	41	
11	Imperia	33	10	11	12	36	43	−7	41	
12	Cairese	33	9	13	11	29	33	−4	40	
13	Club Milano	33	11	6	16	39	48	−9	39	Qualification for relegation playoffs (Note: If the 13th-placed team finishes nine or more points ahead of the 16th-placed team, then the relegation playoff is not played, and the 16th-placed team is relegated to Eccellenza directly. If the 14th-placed team finishes nine or more points ahead of the 15th-placed team, the relegation playoff is not played, and the 15th-placed team is relegated directly to Eccellenza.)
14	Derthona (T)	33	11	6	16	35	45	−10	39	Qualification for relegation playoffs
15	Gozzano (Q)	33	8	12	13	36	42	−6	36	Qualification for relegation playoffs
16	Asti (Q)	33	8	11	14	31	38	−7	35	Qualification for relegation playoffs
17	Lavagnese (R)	33	5	12	16	30	49	−19	27	Relegation to Eccellenza
18	NovaRomentin (Note: 5 points deducted due to a late salary payment.) (R)	33	6	3	24	25	73	−48	16	Relegation to Eccellenza

Updated to match(es) played on 26 April 2026. Source:
Rules for classification: (Note: 1) Points; 2) Head-to-head points; 3) Head-to-head goal difference; 4) Goal difference; 5) Goals scored; 6) Draw.)
(C) Champions; (P) Promoted; (Q) Qualified for the phase indicated; (R) Relegated; (T) Qualified, but not yet for the particular phase indicated

== Group B ==
Pos	Team	Pld	W	D	L	GF	GA	GD	Pts	Promotion, qualification or relegation
1	Folgore Caratese (C, P)	33	18	11	4	53	26	+27	65	Promotion to Serie C
2	Casatese Merate (Q)	33	15	13	5	48	28	+20	58	Qualification for wild card playoffs
3	ChievoVerona (Q)	33	17	6	10	50	42	+8	57	Qualification for wild card playoffs
4	Milan Futuro	33	15	8	10	52	36	+16	53	Qualification for wild card playoffs
5	Leon	33	14	11	8	44	33	+11	53	Qualification for wild card playoffs
6	Brusaporto	33	15	6	12	40	36	+4	51	
7	Oltrepò (Note: 3 points deducted due to unpaid salaries and administrative irregularities.)	33	14	8	11	36	35	+1	47	
8	Villa Valle	33	13	8	12	42	44	−2	47	
9	Scanzorosciate	33	11	13	9	40	32	+8	46	
10	Virtus CiseranoBergamo	33	11	12	10	32	30	+2	45	
11	Caldiero Terme	33	10	14	9	48	38	+10	44	
12	Real Calepina	33	11	8	14	41	46	−5	41	
13	Castellanzese (T)	33	10	10	13	40	38	+2	40	Qualification for relegation playoffs
14	Pavia (Q)	33	9	10	14	35	45	−10	37	Qualification for relegation playoffs
15	Varesina	33	7	14	12	36	42	−6	35	Qualification for relegation playoffs
16	Breno	33	8	11	14	37	50	−13	35	Qualification for relegation playoffs
17	Nuova Sondrio (R)	33	8	7	18	36	59	−23	31	Relegation to Eccellenza
18	Vogherese (Note: 6 points deducted due to financial and administrative irregularities.) (R)	33	2	8	23	20	70	−50	8	Relegation to Eccellenza

Updated to match(es) played on 26 April 2026. Source:
Rules for classification:
(C) Champions; (P) Promoted; (Q) Qualified for the phase indicated; (R) Relegated; (T) Qualified, but not yet for the particular phase indicated

== Group C ==
Pos	Team	Pld	W	D	L	GF	GA	GD	Pts	Promotion, qualification or relegation
1	Treviso (C, P)	33	21	6	6	50	24	+26	69	Promotion to Serie C
2	Legnago Salus (Q)	33	17	7	9	59	40	+19	58	Qualification for wild card playoffs
3	Union Clodiense Chioggia (Q)	33	16	9	8	45	29	+16	57	Qualification for wild card playoffs
4	Brian Lignano	33	15	8	10	54	34	+20	53	Qualification for wild card playoffs
5	Este	33	13	13	7	38	29	+9	52	Qualification for wild card playoffs
6	Mestre	33	13	13	7	36	29	+7	52	
7	Cjarlins Muzane	33	13	12	8	40	35	+5	51	
8	Bassano	33	12	14	7	37	26	+11	50	
9	Conegliano	33	13	11	9	36	27	+9	50	
10	Campodarsego	33	12	9	12	33	33	0	45	
11	Unione La Rocca Altavilla	33	9	16	8	27	24	+3	43	
12	Luparense	33	10	13	10	36	37	−1	43	
13	Calvi Noale	33	12	5	16	37	40	−3	41	Qualification for relegation playoffs
14	Vigasio	33	8	14	11	43	42	+1	38	Qualification for relegation playoffs
15	Maia Alta Obermais	33	8	9	16	32	45	−13	33	Qualification for relegation playoffs
16	San Luigi	33	8	9	16	32	53	−21	33	Qualification for relegation playoffs
17	Adriese (R)	33	5	6	22	24	58	−34	21	Relegation to Eccellenza
18	Portogruaro (R)	33	1	8	24	25	79	−54	11	Relegation to Eccellenza

Updated to match(es) played on 26 April 2026. Source:
Rules for classification:
(C) Champions; (P) Promoted; (Q) Qualified for the phase indicated; (R) Relegated

== Group D ==
Pos	Team	Pld	W	D	L	GF	GA	GD	Pts	Promotion, qualification or relegation
1	Desenzano (X)	33	22	8	3	55	21	+34	74	Promotion to Serie C
2	Lentigione (X)	33	22	6	5	49	21	+28	72	Qualification for wild card playoffs
3	Pistoiese (Q)	33	19	11	3	56	22	+34	68	Qualification for wild card playoffs
4	Piacenza (Q)	33	18	7	8	57	34	+23	61	Qualification for wild card playoffs
5	Pro Palazzolo	33	16	8	9	43	30	+13	56	Qualification for wild card playoffs
6	Pro Sesto	33	15	10	8	45	29	+16	55	
7	Cittadella Vis Modena	33	15	10	8	35	24	+11	55	
8	Rovato Vertovese	33	14	10	9	35	28	+7	52	
9	Sangiuliano City (Note: 3 points deducted due to administrative irregularities.) (E)	33	14	8	11	41	40	+1	47	Bankruptcy
10	Crema	33	9	11	13	34	44	−10	38	
11	Sant'Angelo	33	10	8	15	36	49	−13	38	
12	Correggese	33	8	12	13	34	36	−2	36	
13	Progresso	33	9	9	15	34	41	−7	36	Qualification for relegation playoffs
14	Sasso Marconi	33	8	7	18	32	45	−13	31	Qualification for relegation playoffs
15	Imolese	33	7	10	16	27	47	−20	31	Qualification for relegation playoffs
16	Tropical Coriano (T)	33	7	9	17	28	44	−16	30	Qualification for relegation playoffs
17	Trevigliese (R)	33	5	7	21	28	59	−31	22	Relegation to Eccellenza
18	Tuttocuoio (R)	33	0	7	26	15	70	−55	7	Relegation to Eccellenza

Updated to match(es) played on 26 April 2026. Source:
(E) Eliminated; (Q) Qualified for the phase indicated; (R) Relegated; (T) Qualified, but not yet for the particular phase indicated; (X) Assured of at least wildcard play-offs, but may get promoted directly

== Group E ==
Pos	Team	Pld	W	D	L	GF	GA	GD	Pts	Promotion, qualification or relegation
1	Grosseto (C, P)	33	21	6	6	55	25	+30	69	Promotion to Serie C
2	Tau Calcio Altopascio (Q)	33	17	9	7	51	32	+19	60	Qualification for wild card playoffs
3	Prato (Note: 2 points deducted due to financial irregularities.) (Q)	33	19	5	9	48	29	+19	60	Qualification for wild card playoffs
4	Siena (Q)	33	17	8	8	53	31	+22	59	Qualification for wild card playoffs
5	Seravezza Pozzi (Q)	33	15	11	7	41	28	+13	56	Qualification for wild card playoffs
6	Terranuova Traiana	33	14	8	11	28	30	−2	50	
7	Scandicci	33	11	15	7	39	31	+8	48	
8	Foligno	33	13	9	11	44	37	+7	48	
9	Aquila Montevarchi	33	10	16	7	28	31	−3	46	
10	Sporting Trestina	33	10	11	12	36	38	−2	41	
11	Ghiviborgo	33	10	10	13	42	41	+1	40	
12	San Donato Tavarnelle	33	9	12	12	29	34	−5	39	
13	Orvietana (Q)	33	9	10	14	33	37	−4	37	Qualification for relegation playoffs
14	Follonica Gavorrano	33	9	10	14	35	47	−12	37	Qualification for relegation playoffs
15	Camaiore	33	9	7	17	41	54	−13	34	Qualification for relegation playoffs
16	Poggibonsi	33	6	10	17	28	46	−18	28	Qualification for relegation playoffs
17	Cannara (R)	33	6	8	19	24	58	−34	26	Relegation to Eccellenza
18	Vivi Altotevere Sansepolcro (R)	33	2	15	16	20	46	−26	21	Relegation to Eccellenza

Updated to match(es) played on 26 April 2026. Source:
Rules for classification:
(C) Champions; (P) Promoted; (Q) Qualified for the phase indicated; (R) Relegated

== Group F ==
Pos	Team	Pld	W	D	L	GF	GA	GD	Pts	Promotion, qualification or relegation
1	Ostia Mare (C, P)	33	24	7	2	65	21	+44	79	Promotion to Serie C
2	Ancona (Q)	33	23	6	4	58	21	+37	75	Qualification for wild card playoffs
3	Teramo (Q)	33	21	10	2	64	28	+36	73	Qualification for wild card playoffs
4	Atletico Ascoli (Q)	33	14	12	7	54	34	+20	54	Qualification for wild card playoffs
5	San Nicolò Notaresco	33	13	11	9	42	30	+12	50	Qualification for wild card playoffs
6	L'Aquila	33	14	8	11	52	43	+9	50	
7	Vigor Senigallia	33	12	12	9	42	37	+5	48	
8	Giulianova	33	10	16	7	36	31	+5	46	
9	Fossombrone	33	11	11	11	28	32	−4	44	
10	UniPomezia 1938	33	10	11	12	40	39	+1	41	
11	Termoli	33	8	14	11	26	29	−3	38	
12	Maceratese	33	11	5	17	43	48	−5	38	
13	Sora (E)	33	8	11	14	38	50	−12	35	Bankruptcy
14	Chieti (Q)	33	7	11	15	30	55	−25	32	Qualification for relegation playoffs
15	Recanatese	33	7	8	18	37	57	−20	29	Qualification for relegation playoffs
16	San Marino	33	7	7	19	32	61	−29	28	Qualification for relegation playoffs
17	Castelfidardo (R)	33	6	5	22	30	63	−33	23	Relegation to Eccellenza
18	Sammaurese (Note: 2 points deducted due to administrative irregularities.) (R)	33	5	7	21	30	68	−38	20	Relegation to Eccellenza

Updated to match(es) played on 26 April 2026. Source:
Rules for classification:
(C) Champions; (E) Eliminated; (P) Promoted; (Q) Qualified for the phase indicated; (R) Relegated

== Group G ==
Pos	Team	Pld	W	D	L	GF	GA	GD	Pts	Promotion, qualification or relegation
1	Scafatese (C, P)	33	26	6	1	71	22	+49	84	Promotion to Serie C
2	Trastevere (Q)	33	17	9	7	64	44	+20	60	Qualification for wild card playoffs
3	Monastir	33	14	8	11	49	44	+5	50	Qualification for wild card playoffs
4	Albalonga	33	14	8	11	55	51	+4	50	Qualification for wild card playoffs
5	Flaminia Civitacastellana	33	12	12	9	49	35	+14	48	Qualification for wild card playoffs
6	Nocerina	33	11	14	8	36	32	+4	47	
7	Latte Dolce	33	14	5	14	49	49	0	47	
8	Palmese	33	11	12	10	41	41	0	45	
9	COS Sarrabus Ogliastra	33	12	9	12	45	49	−4	45	
10	Valmontone (E)	33	13	6	14	44	50	−6	45	Bankruptcy
11	Budoni	33	12	8	13	34	32	+2	44	
12	Atletico Lodigiani	33	10	11	12	41	40	+1	41	
13	Ischia	33	11	7	15	35	52	−17	40	Qualification for relegation playoffs
14	Anzio	33	9	11	13	36	43	−7	38	Qualification for relegation playoffs
15	Real Monterotondo (Q)	33	10	6	17	39	53	−14	36	Qualification for relegation playoffs
16	Olbia (Note: 2 points deducted due to administrative irregularities.)	33	8	13	12	37	49	−12	35	Qualification for relegation playoffs
17	Montespaccato (R)	33	6	12	15	45	54	−9	30	Relegation to Eccellenza
18	Cassino (R)	33	4	9	20	24	54	−30	21	Relegation to Eccellenza

Updated to match(es) played on 26 April 2026. Source:
Rules for classification:
(C) Champions; (E) Eliminated; (P) Promoted; (Q) Qualified for the phase indicated; (R) Relegated

== Group H ==
Pos	Team	Pld	W	D	L	GF	GA	GD	Pts	Promotion, qualification or relegation
1	Barletta (C, P)	33	20	10	3	54	19	+35	70	Promotion to Serie C
2	Martina (Q)	33	18	8	7	46	28	+18	62	Wild card playoffs
3	Città di Fasano (Q, E)	33	17	8	8	45	35	+10	59	Bankruptcy
4	Paganese (Q)	33	17	7	9	36	26	+10	58	Wild card playoffs
5	Nardò	33	13	13	7	39	27	+12	52	Wild card playoffs
6	Gravina	33	15	7	11	47	38	+9	52	
7	Afragolese	33	13	10	10	45	44	+1	49	
8	Fidelis Andria	33	13	9	11	34	26	+8	48	
9	Virtus Francavilla	33	12	11	10	43	38	+5	47	
10	Real Normanna	33	10	13	10	25	23	+2	43	
11	Sarnese	33	9	13	11	49	47	+2	40	
12	Francavilla	33	10	10	13	37	38	−1	40	
13	Manfredonia	33	10	10	13	32	38	−6	40	Qualification for relegation playoffs
14	Nola	33	10	8	15	40	49	−9	38	Qualification for relegation playoffs
15	Heraclea Calcio	33	9	8	16	29	38	−9	35	Qualification for relegation playoffs
16	Pompei	33	8	7	18	24	37	−13	31	Qualification for relegation playoffs
17	Ferrandina	33	7	9	17	20	41	−21	30	Relegation to Eccellenza
18	Real Acerrana (R)	33	3	5	25	19	72	−53	14	Relegation to Eccellenza

Updated to match(es) played on 26 April 2026. Source:
Rules for classification:
(C) Champions; (E) Eliminated; (P) Promoted; (Q) Qualified for the phase indicated; (R) Relegated

== Group I ==
Pos	Team	Pld	W	D	L	GF	GA	GD	Pts	Promotion, qualification or relegation
1	Savoia	33	19	9	5	60	29	+31	66	Promotion to Serie C
2	Nissa	33	18	10	5	47	26	+21	64	Qualification for wild card playoffs
3	Reggina	33	19	6	8	40	21	+19	63	Qualification for wild card playoffs
4	Athletic Club Palermo (Q)	33	17	6	10	57	46	+11	57	Qualification for wild card playoffs
5	Gelbison (Q)	33	16	9	8	43	32	+11	57	Qualification for wild card playoffs
6	Nuova Igea Virtus (Note: 5 points deducted due to having fielded a disqualified player.)	33	15	13	5	48	32	+16	53	
7	Sambiase	33	14	11	8	36	26	+10	53	
8	Milazzo	33	12	8	13	31	35	−4	44	
9	Città di Gela (Note: 1 point deducted due to unpaid salaries to a player in a past season.)	33	13	5	15	41	43	−2	43	
10	Vigor Lamezia	33	10	9	14	39	34	+5	39	
11	CastrumFavara	33	10	7	16	36	45	−9	37	
12	Enna	33	8	11	14	48	51	−3	35	
13	Ragusa	33	7	13	13	22	32	−10	34	Qualification for relegation playoffs
14	Acireale (Note: 1 point deducted due to administrative irregularities.)	33	7	12	14	37	49	−12	32	Qualification for relegation playoffs
15	Vibonese	33	7	11	15	31	47	−16	32	Qualification for relegation playoffs
16	Messina (Note: 14 points deducted due to administrative irregularities.)	33	10	13	10	27	33	−6	29	Qualification for relegation playoffs
17	Sancataldese	33	7	8	18	31	46	−15	29	Relegation to Eccellenza
18	Paternò (R)	33	4	7	22	21	68	−47	19	Relegation to Eccellenza

Updated to match(es) played on 26 April 2026. Source:
Rules for classification:
(Q) Qualified for the phase indicated; (R) Relegated
