= Coppa Italia Serie D =

Association football competition in Italy

- Organiser(s): Lega Nazionale Dilettanti
- Founded: 1999
- Region: Italy
- Teams: 162
- Current champions: Ravenna (1st title)
- Most championships: No club has won more than one title
- Website: lnd.it
- 2026–27 Coppa Italia Serie D

Coppa Italia Serie D (Italian for Serie D Italian Cup) is a straight knock-out based competition involving teams from Serie D in Italian football. The competition is held since the 1999–2000, when Serie D clubs split from Coppa Italia Dilettanti, a tournament that was opened also to teams from Eccellenza and Promozione. Only the semi-finals and the final are on a home/away basis.

== Past winners ==
Season	Winners	Runners-up
1999–2000	Castrense	Montecchio
2000–01	Todi	Fanfulla
2001–02	Pievigina	Grottaglie
2002–03	Sansovino	USO Calcio
2003–04	Juve Stabia	Massese
2004–05	USO Calcio	Isola Liri
2005–06	Sorrento	Giarre
2006–07	Aversa Normanna	Rodengo Saiano
2007–08	Como	Colligiana
2008–09	Sapri	Villacidrese
2009–10	Matera	Voghera
2010–11	Perugia	Turris
2011–12	Sant'Antonio Abate	Sandonà
2012–13	Torre Neapolis	Delta Porto Tolle
2013–14	Pomigliano	Pontisola
2014–15	Fondi	Correggese
2015–16	Monopoli	OltrepòVoghera
2016–17	Chieri	Albalonga
2017–18	Campodarsego	San Donato Tavarnelle
2018–19	Matelica	Messina
2019–20	Abandoned due to the COVID-19 pandemic	
2020–21	Not played	
2021–22	Follonica Gavorrano	Torres
2022–23	Pineto	Giana Erminio
2023–24	Trapani	Follonica Gavorrano
2024–25	Ravenna	Guidonia Montecelio
2025–26	Pistoiese	Ancona

== See also ==
- Serie D
- Coppa Italia Dilettanti
- Football in Italy
