= Li Yonghong =

Chinese businessman

- Born: 16 September 1969 (age 56); Huazhou, Guangdong, China
Citizenship
mainland China	(1969–1994)
Hong Kong	(1994–present)
- Occupations: Businessman, investor
- Known for: Former owner of Duolun Investment (HK); Former GM of Chief Power Real Estate; Former owner of A.C. Milan
- Father: Li Naizhi
Family
Li Hongqiang	(brother)
Li Yongfei	(brother)

Li Yong Hong
- Simplified Chinese: 李勇鸿
- Traditional Chinese: 李勇鴻
Transcriptions
Standard Mandarin
- Hanyu Pinyin: Li Yǒnghóng

Li Yonghong (born 16 September 1969) is a Chinese businessman and investor who first came into the public eye in 2016 when he succeeded Silvio Berlusconi as the owner of the Italian football club A.C. Milan. Li is also known for his stock market transactions in mainland China.

Li Yonghong was born in Guantang Village, Daqiao Town, Huazhou, Maoming, Guangdong Province. He also had a citizenship in the Hong Kong S.A.R. of China by migrating there in 1994 (claimed by himself), which was considered as a "foreign" investor in mainland China due to separate legal jurisdiction of Hong Kong from the rest of China.

== Career ==
According to a C.V. provided by Li Yonghong to Duolun Industry, Li Yonghong was the director and general manager of a Hong Kong incorporated company Enson Enterprises Limited (Chinese: 安順企業有限公司) from 1994 to 1997 (a company dissolved by striking-off in 2000); the director and general manager of a Chongqing-based company (Chinese: 爱普科技; lit. 'Aipu Technology') from 1997 to 2005, as well as chairman and CEO of Hong Kong-incorporated "Grand Dragon International Holdings Co., Ltd." from 2005.

However, according to the filings in Hong Kong Companies Registry, there was no such Li Yonghong in the board of directors of Enson Enterprises, nor in Grand Dragon.

Instead, Li Yonghong was the director of China Power Group (HK) Limited (Chinese: 華力寶集團(香港)有限公司), Hong Kong China Power Books Publication Co., Ltd. (Chinese: 香港華力寶圖書出版有限公司), Noble Wisdom Development Limited (Chinese: 卓彥發展有限公司) and LYH Investment Limited, according to the database of Hong Kong Companies Registry.

== A.C. Milan ==
In August 2016, Fininvest, the parent company of Italian football club A.C. Milan, signed a preliminary agreement with the Chinese investment management company Sino-Europe Sports Investment Management Changxing Co., Ltd. (Chinese: 中欧体育投资管理长兴有限公司) to sell the club for €740 million (including €220 million indebtedness of the company), valued on 30 June 2016 (A further €90 million cost of the club from 1 July to the closing date was added to the valuation). Sino-Europe Sports paid Fininvest €100 million immediately after the deal as a deposit, and the closing date of the deal was set at December 2016.

According to the Chinese Government's National Enterprise Credit Information Publicity System, Sino-Europe Sports, registered in Changxing County, was solely owned by mainland Chinese citizen Chen Huashan (Chinese: 陈华山) with a share capital of just CN¥100 million. However, it was reported that Li Yonghong and a private equity fund (Chinese: 海峡中欧私募投资基金) of Haixia Capital Management were the true owners of Sino-Europe Sports. Sino-Europe Sports was represented by David Han Li in the signing of the contracts with Fininvest.

In the same month, Sino-Europe Sports founded a private equity fund (incorporated as a limited partnership as 中欧体育投资长兴合伙企业) to raise funds to acquire Milan, and Chinese listed company Rongyu Group (formerly known as Jilin Yongda Group) signed an agreement to subscribe CN¥300 million deferred share, and would only pay-in the capital when the fund raised enough capital in ordinary and preference share.

However, Sino-Europe Sports failed to pay the residual sum in December, and the deal was delayed to March 2017. Sino-Europe Sports paid a second deposit of €100 million (making the total deposit €200 million) to Fininvest via Hong Kong subsidiaries of Sino-Europe Sports: Rossoneri Sport Investment Co., Ltd. and Rossoneri Champion Co., Ltd.. However, according to the filing in the Hong Kong Companies Registry, Rossoneri Sport Investment borrowed HK$830 million (around €100 million according to the exchange rate at that time) from a BVI-incorporated company, Willy Shine International Holdings Limited (Chinese: 威陽國際控股有限公司) on 13 December 2016. The loan was refurbished on 23 January 2017. In February 2017, Rossoneri Sport Investment (of Hong Kong) was recapitalised by yet another BVI-incorporated company Rossoneri Advanced Co., Ltd. for HK$864.5 million, meaning Sino-Europe Sports became a minority shareholder in Rossoneri Sport Investment (of Hong Kong) for HK$100 million share, or 10.37%, although Chen remained as the sole director of Rossoneri Sport Investment and the 100% owner of the entire share capital of Rossoneri Champion. The two BVI companies had raised concerns in Italy as to who the actual investors were.

Sino-Europe Sports failed to pay the residual sum again in March 2017. In order to finalise the deal, the company received a loan from Elliott Management Corporation, an investment firm which has widely been described as a vulture fund. According to Calcio e Finanza, Elliott used two associate companies, King George Investments and Genio Investments, to finance the parent company of Milan that was owned by Li indirectly. It was further reported that another private equity fund, Blue Skye, also financed the deal.

On 13 April 2017, the sale was officially finalised, and Rossoneri Sport Investment Luxembourg Sàrl became the new direct parent company of the club. Rossoneri Luxembourg, as of January 2017, was owned by the Hong Kong company Rossoneri Sport Investment. On 14 April, Li Yonghong was confirmed as the new chairman of the club, and Marco Fassone was confirmed as CEO (Italian: Amministratore Delegato). It was reported that the final price of the club was €606 million (the price including a refurbishment of a €90m credit line of Fininvest to Milan), excluding the refurbishment of the club debt. The club had planned to issue 2 tranches of corporate bonds for a total of €128m, as well as a recapitalization of a maximum of €60m, in order to fund the club in 2017 after the takeover.

On 22 October 2017, it was revealed by David Webb that Teamway International Group (known as Jin Bao Bao at that time), a small-sized Hong Kong-listed company, had lent US$8.3 million (approx. HK$65 million by the narrow band floating exchange rate) to Hong Kong-based Rossoneri Sport Investment. According to the press release by Teamway on 29 August 2017, it was also revealed that Rossoneri Advance[d] was owned by Li Yonghong himself; Li charged the entire issued shares of Rossoneri Advance[d] to Teamway International Group as collateral. In September 2017, Rossoneri Sport Investment also filed a revised "Annual Return" to reflect the "correct" condition in June 2017, that Rossoneri Advance owned all the shares of the company. On 31 October 2017, Reuters reported that Li only paid-in €27 million out of €60 million capital increase of AC Milan so far, matching the concern of his financial condition, willingness and ability to recapitalize Milan with such a high interest rate on a small amount of loan. Last but not least, Li failed to refurbish the loan in February 2018, but was allowed to extend for a month, with an interest rate of 24% p.a.

On 16 November 2017, The New York Times reported that Li alleged that he had a mining empire to Italian football officials, which "was hardly known even in mining circles [of China]." The mining empire, on paper, was owned by other people. However, the newspaper also stated that "Some wealthy people in China list their holdings under the names of relatives or associates to avoid scrutiny". At the same time, UEFA was not convinced to accept a proposal from Milan, regarding a voluntary agreement that aimed to delay the deadline for the break-even requirement of UEFA Financial Fair Play Regulations, according to a report from La Gazzetta dello Sport. It was formally rejected in December by UEFA, citing "uncertainties in relation to the refinancing of the loans to be paid back in October 2018 and the financial guarantees provided by the main shareholder."; Marca speculated that the club may face disciplinary action regarding the club's summer spending. Eventually Milan was banned by UEFA from European competition for the 2018–19 season, citing "the break-even requirement". It was reported that Milan failed to meet the aggregate break-even requirement for the period from 2014 to 2017.

In July 2018, Elliott Management acquired full ownership of Milan. On 12 July, Elliott officially struck-off Li's holding company Rossoneri Champion Inv. Lux. as a shareholder of Milan's direct parent company Rossoneri Sport Inv. Lux. According to the press release of Teamway International Group, Li also defaulted on the loan from Teamway International Group.

structure of Sino-Europe Sports (as of January 2017)

Chen Huashan
Sino-Europe Sports Investment Management Changxing
Sino-Europe Sports Investment Changxing LP
Rossoneri Sport Investment Management Changxing
Rossoneri Sport Investment
Rossoneri Sport Investment Luxembourg

?
2 private equity funds
Rossoneri Champion

structure of AC Milan Group (as of June 2017)

Li Yonghong

Rossoneri Advance[d]

Rossoneri Sport Investment

- Blue Skye Financial Partners
- King George Investments
- Genio Investments

Rossoneri Champion Investment Luxembourg

Rossoneri Champion

Project Redblack

Rossoneri Sport Investment Luxembourg

A.C. Milan

== Other Business Activities ==
=== Jade Valley Group ===
It was reported that Li Yonghong is the son of Li Naizhi (Chinese: 李乃志) and younger brother of Li Yongfei (Chinese: 李勇飞), which were arrested in 2003 for illegally raising funds in Huazhou, Maoming. According to legal proceeding, Li family had set up a company in mainland China as Jade Valley Development (Chinese: 绿色山河开发) to invest in farmland. However, they also made false dividend forecast to attract investment as a pyramid scheme.

According to the legal proceeding and Hong Kong Companies Registry, Li family had set up a Hong Kong company Jade Valley Group Limited (Chinese: 綠色山河集團有限公司, formerly known as Lis Consortium (International) Limited; 利事集團投資有限公司) to channel the assets, which was 95% owned by Li Yonghong's eldest brother Li Hongqiang (Chinese: 李洪强); the rest of the share was owned by a Honduras citizen, with unknown relation with Li family. Chinese police failed to arrest Li Hongqiang as he also had Hong Kong citizenship and evaded from mainland China. It was reported that Li Hongqiang had emigrated to Honduras. Jade Valley Group Limited was dissolved by striking off from the register by the government of Hong Kong in 2005.

According to 1993 Hainan Yearbook, Li family's Jade Valley Group Limited incorporated two subsidiaries in Hainan (Chinese: 海南首力房地产开发有限公司; lit. 'Hainan Chief Power Real Estate Development Co.', 'Ltd.' and Chinese: 海口首力酒店有限公司; lit. 'Haikou Chief Power Hotel Co.', 'Ltd.'), to develop Chief Power Building (Chinese: 首力大厦; pinyin: Shǒulì Dàshà), which Li Yonghong was the general manager and his eldest brother Li Hongqiang as the chairman. In 2010 Chief Power Real Estate was dissolved by strike-off from the registry by the administration bureau, as the bureau failed to inspect the company. Chief Power Hotel Co., Ltd. was also involved in numerous legal dispute with others, including the selling of a unit in Chief Power Building without disclosing the unit had been mortgaged, contract dispute with a pawn shop in the sell and bought back of a unit of Chief Power Building, and fail to repayment of loans to China Construction Bank (the bad debt was later transferred to China Cinda Asset Management) and China Investment Bank (for US$1.1 million; the bank business was received by China CITIC Bank). Chief Power Hotel Co., Ltd. was also suffered from a scam that another person falsify a document to sell unit A2 of 12/F of Chief Power Building.

=== Duolun Industry ===
Li Yonghong was also sanctioned CN¥600,000 in 2013 by the Chinese regulator China Securities Regulatory Commission for failing to disclose the sale of the entire share capital of the parent company of a Chinese listed company Shanghai Duolun Industry Co., Ltd. (SSE: 600696, now known as "P2P Financial Information Service Co., Ltd.").

The holding company, known as "Duolun Investment (Hong Kong) Co., Ltd." at that time (now known as "P2P (China) Co., Ltd.") was incorporated in Hong Kong. The holding company owned 11.75% shares of the listed company as the largest shareholder at 31 December 2011. Li Yonghong acquired the holding company in December 2011 for CN¥360 million and sold in May–June 2012 for CN¥340 million. Before the deal, the holding company had already faced financial difficulties, which pledged 11.75% shares of the listed company to Bohai Trust in October 2011, as well as selling a further 15.22% shares from April to September 2011 and an additional 9.53% shares in November 2011. A pledge of 35.82% shares of the listed company (to Hua Xia Bank and New China Trust) were only released in April and September 2011.

In July 2013, the pledge of the 11.75% share of the listed company by the holding company was released by Bohai Trust. However, the holding company, under the new owner Xian Yan (Chinese: 鲜言), pledged the entire 11.75% shares back to Li Yonghong. Half of the pledged shares were released in April 2014 and May 2014, only sold by the holding company on the same day. In August 2014, the shares pledged to Li Yonghong were released, only re-pledged to Ping An Securities on the same day.

According to a news report by China Securities Journal, Chen Jianyong (Chinese: 陈建勇) and Xian Li (Chinese: 鲜栗), the relatives of Li Yonghong and Xian Yan respectively, had formed two companies (Chinese: 广东鸿远能源投资 and Chinese: 湖北精九投资) respectively, which were the investors in a private equity fund (as a trust) to buy the shares of Duolun Industry, which was accused by other investor (Chinese: 江苏沐雪) of the fund as insider trading.

=== Using alias ===
According to news report by Securities Times (a newspaper of "People's Daily Press"), Li Yonghong may used an alias Li Bingfeng (Chinese: 李秉峰) to do business in some companies, such as Beijing Dahe Zhizhou Group (Chinese: 北京大河之洲集团) and Li family's Chief Power Real Estate.

=== Grand Dragon International Holding ===
Li Yonghong alleged himself as the chairman of Hong Kong-incorporated Grand Dragon International Holdings (Chinese: 龍浩國際集團; pinyin: Lóng Hào Guójì Jítuán; lit. 'Longhao International Group'). The company falsely claimed itself as the official Chinese side representative to build the Thai Canal.

In 2017 a press release of Grand Dragon International Holding appeared on the website of another company Guangdong Longhao Aviation Group (Chinese: 广东龙浩航空集团; pinyin: Guǎngdōng Lóng Hào Hángkōng Jítuán), denying Li was the chairman of Grand Dragon International Holdings at any time.

=== List of Dishonest Judgment Debtors ===
On 12 September 2018, Li was added to the List of Dishonest Judgment Debtors (Chinese: 失信被执行人名单; pinyin: shīxìn bèi zhíxíng rén míngdān) by the local court of Jingmen. According to the press release, Li defaulted a loan from aforementioned Hubei Jingjiu (Chinese: 湖北精九; pinyin: Húběi Jīngjiǔ).
