= Teamway International Group =

Teamway International Group Holdings
- Formerly: Jin Bao Bao Holdings
- Company type: public
- Traded as: SEHK: 1239
- ISIN: KYG8713D1051
- Industry: manufacturing, conglomerate
- Founded: 4 January 2011; 15 years ago
- Founder: Chao Pang Ieng
Headquarters
Grand Cayman, Cayman Islands	(legal)
Tsim Sha Tsui, Hong Kong	(de facto)
- Area served: mainland China, Hong Kong
- Key people: Xu Gefei (chairman)
- Products: packaging products and structural components
- Services: corporate secretarial, consultancy and business valuation services
- Revenue: ▲CN¥379 million (2017)
- Net income: ▼CN¥ negative 2 million (2017)
- Total assets: ▲CN¥746 million (2017)
- Total equity: ▲CN¥284 million (2017)
Owner
Cao Longbing	(19.82%)
Ling Zheng	(8.43%)
Jiang Zhong	(7.55%)

former Chinese name
- Traditional Chinese: 金寶寶控股有限公司
- Simplified Chinese: 金宝宝控股有限公司
Transcriptions
Standard Mandarin
- Hanyu Pinyin: Jīn bǎo bǎo kòng gǔ yǒu xiàn gōng sī
Yue: Cantonese
- Jyutping: gam1 bou2 bou2 hung3 gu2 jau5 haan6 gung1 si1
- Website: www.teamwaygroup.com
- Footnotes / references in consolidated financial statement

Teamway International Group Holdings Limited is a Cayman-incorporated holding company based in Hong Kong and in the mainland China. It is a "registered non-Hong Kong company" in the Hong Kong Companies Registry since 2011. It was formerly known as Jin Bao Bao Holdings Limited (the Chinese legal name registered in Hong Kong was 金寶寶控股有限公司). According to the company itself, it is "principally engaged in the business of (i) design, manufacture and sale of packaging products and structural components in the PRC; (ii) provision of corporate secretarial, consultancy and business valuation services; and (iii) property investment."

== History ==
Jin Bao Bao Holdings Limited is a Chinese packaging group; the holding company itself, was incorporated in the Cayman Islands on 4 January 2011, but headquartered in Hong Kong.

In December 2011, shortly after its initial public offering on the Stock Exchange of Hong Kong, the company was also infamously known for its narrow shareholders base, which 15 shareholders owned 96.11% shares of the company. The company later resolved the problem by widen its share capital.

In February 2017, it was also known for a 52% soar in its share price within two hours. According to a Hong Kong newspaper, South China Morning Post, the largest beneficial owner (20.59% of total share capital) of the holding company at that time, Huang Youlong and his wife Zhao Wei, also owned Zhejiang Talent Television & Film, Sino Golf Holdings, Yunfeng Financial, Zhejiang People Culture [sic] (Chinese: 浙江万家文化; Zhejiang Wanjia Culture) and Alibaba Pictures Group, all were listed companies on the Hong Kong or on the Shenzhen Stock Exchange. They sold the shares of Teamway in July 2017; the couple were banned to enter the securities market of the mainland China by the China Securities Regulatory Commission for market manipulation on Sunriver Culture (Chinese: 祥源文化; former Wanjia Culture) in November 2017.

In April 2017, after acquiring the corporate secretarial, consultancy and business valuation services in November 2016, the company attempted to sell the packaging main business. However, it was collapsed. In May 2017, Teamway International became an indirect shareholder of Singapore-listed company Cityneon, as part of a consortium called "Lucrum 1 Investment". Jin Bao Bao owned 8.5% stake in the consortium. In November 2017 a memorandum of understanding was signed to acquire the controlling stake (additional 76% shares) of Lucrum 1 Investment from other investor: BVI-incorporated Massive Right Investments. It was reported that Massive Right Investments was owned by Geng Zhihua. The deal to acquire Lucrum 1 Investment was collapsed in February 2018.

The holding company was proposed to rename to Teamway International Group Holdings Limited in July 2017; it became effective in October.

Teamway International, via a subsidiary Great Earn International, was also known for lending money to Li Yonghong's investment vehicle "Rossoneri Sport Investment" on 28 August 2017, for US$8.3 million (approx. HK$65 million) which was an indirect parent company of Italian football club A.C. Milan. According to Teamway, Li Yonghong charged the share of "Rossoneri Advance", the parent company of "Rossoneri Sport Investment" to Teamway, which David Webb, a critic, doubted the deal, as there was another "lower stream" holding company incorporated in Luxembourg, which Teamway may not be the ultimate controller of A.C. Milan if any default and/or in the senior rank of repayment.

== Shareholders ==
As of 30 June 2017, it was 19.03% owned by Huang Youlong, husband of Chinese actress Zhao Wei as the largest substantial shareholder. However, on 7 July 2017, Huang sold the entire stake he held (2.100 billion number of shares). At the same time, Cao Longbing (Chinese: 操隆兵; pinyin: Cāo Lóng Bīng), via Bright State Investment, acquired the same number of shares for an average price of HK$0.0670. Huang acquired the stake (20.59% of the share capital at that time) in June 2016 for HK$0.3 per share, from Trend Rich Enterprises; Trend Rich Enterprises was an investment vehicle of Liu Liangjian (Chinese: 劉良建). Liu Liangjian himself acquired the stake (75% of the share capital at that time) from Rich Gold International, for HK$3.733 per share [before the subdivision of shares in May 2015 and subsequent issue of bonus share to the existing shareholder] in January 2015, or approx. HK$0.07466 per share, which he sold 2.1 billion number of share to the off-market for HK0.3 per shares on 22 January 2016, few days after selling 1.9 billion share to the "open market" that eventually went to Liu Yang for the same price and on the same day; Rich Gold International was the investment vehicle of Chao Pang Ieng (Chinese: 周鵬鷹). The initial public offering price [before splitting and issue of new and bonus share], was just HK$1.25 in 2011.

The second largest substantial shareholder, As of 30 June 2017, was a private equity fund Riverwood China Growth Fund, that was managed by Atlantis Capital Holdings, a company owned by Liu Yang (simplified Chinese: 刘央; traditional Chinese: 劉央), for 14.10% shares (about 1.555 billion of shares, was 1.9 billion in January 2016). Liu Yang's stake was also acquired from Liu Liangjian (via open market) for HK$0.30 per share on 19 January 2016; she was one of the 2012 "Asia's 50 Power Businesswomen" by Forbes.

The third largest substantial shareholder, As of 30 June 2017, was Ling Zheng (Chinese: 凌正), for 8.43% shares (930 million number of shares), who also served as the chairman of the company since 27 September 2016. Ling Zheng acquired the stake for HK$0.26 per share in December 2015 from Liu Liangjian. Liu Liangjian also sold 470 million shares to Fang Haibo (Chinese: 方海波) on the same day.

The fourth largest substantial shareholder, As of 30 June 2017 (7.55% or 833.34 million number of shares) was Jiang Zhong (Chinese: 江中, via Media Range Limited) which was purchased on 25 May for HK$0.06 per share (HK$50 million in new share).
