= Yongda =

Yongda is the romanization of Chinese word 永大 and 永达 (Pinyin: Yǒng dà and Yǒng dá respectively), may refer to:

- China Yongda Automobiles Services Holdings Limited, a Chinese listed company based in Shanghai (listed on the Hong Kong Stock Exchange)
  - Yongda Cup, a Go competition
- Jilin Yongda Group, a Chinese listed company based in Jilin City, Jilin Province (listed on the Shenzhen Stock Exchange)
- Fujian Yongda Group, a Chinese steel maker based in Zhangzhou, Fujian Province

== See also ==
- Yungtay, the Taiwanese romanization of the Chinese word 永大
  - Yungtay Engineering Co., Ltd.
    - Shanghai Yungtay, a subsidiary of Yungtay Engineering
    - Yungtay Cup, a Go competition
