= Jean-Pierre Meersseman =

Jean-Pierre Meersseman is a Belgian chiropractor and sports scientist. Besides Belgium, he has worked in Italy. He has been described as "something of a miracle worker in Italian football".

== Career ==
Jean-Pierre Meersseman graduated in Chiropractic in 1971 from the Palmer College of Chiropractic, Iowa (USA). He started practicing chiropractic in Italy in 1972, where he founded the Sanrocco chiropractic center and where, in the 1980s, he directed the "Villa Aprica" hospital in Como, later acquired by the San Donato group. In 1990, he founded JPM Chiropractic.

Meersseman was considered a European pioneer of chiropractic during the 1980s. During the 1990s was asked to treat the Italian prime minister and the Italian Serie A side Milan owner Silvio Berlusconi's backaches. After that, he was hired by Milan through the CEO Adriano Galliani.

In 2002, he and Adriano Galliani founded Milan Lab, the football science center of Italian Serie A side Milan. After working for Milan, Meersseman continued running his clinic in Como, Italy.
