= Boglioli =

Italian tailoring company

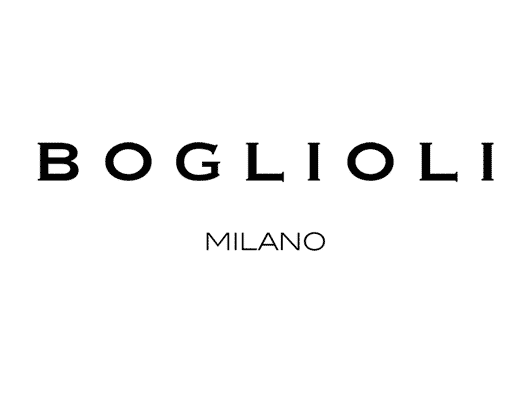
- Industry: Fashion
- Founded: 1974; 52 years ago
- Headquarters: Gambara, Italy
- Owner: Phi Industrial Acquisitions
- Number of employees: 200
- Website: www.bogliolimilano.com

Boglioli is a tailoring company originally based in the Italian town of Gambara, Brescia. The showroom is in Via Tortona 31 in Milan. Its signature item of menswear is garment-dyed jackets. The president and CEO of the company is Francesco Russo.

== History ==
Boglioli was founded in 1974 as a family-run Italian business, established by Mario Boglioli along with his brother Stefano. In 1987, the brand presented its first collection during Pitti Uomo.

In the early 1990s, little brother Pierluigi Boglioli joined the family business and introduced the brand's signature jacket, a deconstructed cashmere jacket with a vintage feel, characterised by its washed-out colors obtained through the garment-dying process, in which the dye is added to the garment only after it has been stitched.

The success in the Italian market pushed Boglioli to expand worldwide to such countries as the United States, Canada, Japan, and Russia.

In 2013, Pierluigi and Mario Boglioli sold Boglioli to a private equity group. During the 2010s, Boglioli expanded from tailoring to global fashion and branding, and hired Gucci's former head of tailoring to operate this shift. Boglioli opened its first retail store on Via San Pietro all’Orto in Milan in 2014, then one on Bond Street in New York City in 2016.

Starting in 2016, Boglioli was the official style partner of the soccer team A.C. Milan in a partnership lasting until the 2019/2020 season.

In 2022, Boglioli launched its line of womenswear.

== See also ==
- Italian fashion
- Made in Italy
