= Gre-No-Li =

Footballing trio

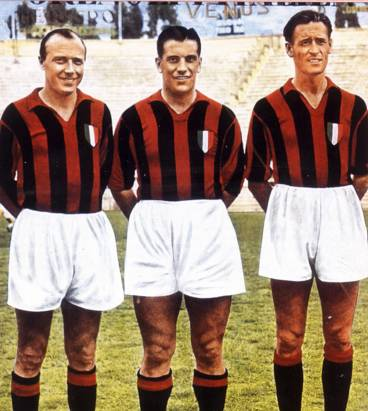
Gunnar Gren, Gunnar Nordahl and Nils Liedholm with A.C. Milan.

Gre-No-Li is a contraction of the surnames of three Swedish footballers: Gunnar Gren, Gunnar Nordahl and Nils Liedholm. The denomination was colloquially used after these players composed a formidable trio of attacking players while playing for the Sweden national team and Italian club A.C. Milan in the 1950s.

The three forwards led Sweden to Olympic gold at the 1948 Olympic tournament in London. Shortly after that success, in January 1949, centre-forward Nordahl joined Milan, and was accompanied by Gren and Liedholm in the summer of the same year.

The impact of the trio was immediate. Nordahl scored 16 goals in 15 matches in the second half of the 1948–49 season, and in the 1949-50 season Milan scored 118 goals in 38 matches (a record in 20-teams Serie A seasons). The trio's most notable achievement at the club came the following season, when Milan won the scudetto; their first was won 44 years previously. Others have won the title: 1955 (Liedholm and Nordahl); 1957 and 1958 (Liedholm but Gren and Nordahl had moved away). Gunnar Nordahl was particularly successful in Italy, as he was the overall top-scorer in five out of seven Serie A seasons, between 1949 and 1956. He remains, as of 2023, the third-highest goalscorer in the history of the league, and the all-time top-scorer in Milan history. The trio's contribution was fundamental also in archieving two Latin Cups, in 1951 and 1956, the latter won without Gren, who had left the club in 1953. Nordahl left Milan in 1956 to join Roma, while Liedholm stayed with the club as a leader in the midfield and being the captain from 1956 to 1961, when he retired from football.
