= Marco Fassone =

Marco Fassone (born August 17, 1964) is an Italian business executive and sports manager, former managing director of AC Milan. He assumed this role after Li Yonghong’s Luxembourg-based holding company, Rossoneri Sport Investment, completed the takeover of Milan from Italian media mogul and former prime minister Silvio Berlusconi.

He has previously held leadership positions at other football clubs, most notably, Juventus, Napoli and Inter Milan.
