= Milan Lab =

Milan Lab is the football science center of Italian Serie A side Milan.

== History ==
Milan Lab was founded in 2002 by Belgian doctor Jean-Pierre Meersseman and Milan CEO Adriano Galliani.
