= Italo Galbiati =

Italian footballer and coach (1937–2023)

Personal information
- Date of birth: 8 August 1937
- Place of birth: Milan, Italy
- Date of death: 8 March 2023 (aged 85)
- Position: Midfielder

Senior career*
| Years | Team | Apps | (Gls) |
| 1958–1960 | Inter Milan | 1 | (0) |
| 1959–1960 | → Reggina | 13 | (0) |
| 1960–1966 | Lecco | 146 | (5) |
| 1966–1967 | Como | 31 | (3) |

Managerial career
- 1967–1968: Puteolana
- 1980–1982: AC Milan Primavera
- 1981: AC Milan
- 1982: AC Milan
- 1982–1984: AC Milan (assistant coach)
- 1984: AC Milan
- 1984–1986: AC Milan (assistant coach)
- 1986–1987: AC Milan Primavera
- 1987–1996: AC Milan (assistant coach)
- 1996–1997: Real Madrid (assistant coach)
- 1997–1999: AC Milan (assistant coach)
- 1999–2004: Roma (assistant coach)
- 2004–2006: Juventus (technical collaborator)
- 2006–2007: Real Madrid (assistant coach)
- 2007–2012: England (assistant coach)
- 2012–2015: Russia (assistant coach)
- * Club domestic league appearances and goals

Italo Galbiati (8 August 1937 – 8 March 2023) was an Italian football coach and player. He was a trusted assistant to Fabio Capello having worked with Capello at AC Milan, Roma, Juventus, Real Madrid and England national team. He also managed AC Milan himself on a caretaker basis, and was an assistant manager to Capello with the Russia national team.

== Career ==
Galbiati was born in Milan on 8 August 1937. A midfielder, he played for Inter Milan from 1958 to 1960, only managing to win a single cap, in a Fairs Cup away game against Olympique Lyon. He later served as caretaker for AC Milan during the early 1980s, and then joining Fabio Capello as assistant through all of his managing career.

Galbiati was described as the 'good cop', when dealing with players, as opposed to Capello's 'bad cop'.

Sporting positions
| Preceded by Terry Venables | England national football team assistant manager 2008 – 2012 with Franco Baldini | Succeeded by Ray Lewington |
