= Rongyu Group =

- Formerly: Jilin Yongda Group
- Type: public
- Traded as: SZSE: 002622
- Founded: 1993 (predecessor); 6 November 1998 (date of incorporation)
- Founder: Lu Yongxiang; Lu Yang; Lu Lan; Lan Xiuzhen; Lu Yongkai; Lu Yuzhen; Li Xiangwen
- Headquarters: Jilin City, China
- Brands: YDD
- Revenue: ▼CN¥146.5 million (2015)
- Operating income: ▲CN¥91.0 million (2015)
- Net income: ▲CN¥90.3 million (2015)
- Total assets: ▼CN¥1.352 billion (2015)
- Total equity: ▼CN¥1.154 billion (2015)
- Owner: Guangzhou Huiyin Rifeng (23.81%)
- Website: jlydjt.com
- Footnotes in consolidated basis

Rongyu Group Co., Ltd.
- Simplified Chinese: 融钰集团股份有限公司
- Traditional Chinese: 融鈺集團股份有限公司
Transcriptions

Jilin Yongda Group Co., Ltd.
- Simplified Chinese: 吉林永大集团股份有限公司
- Traditional Chinese: 吉林永大集團股份有限公司
Transcriptions
Standard Mandarin
- Hanyu Pinyin: Jílín yǒng dà jítuán gǔfèn yǒuxiàn gōngsī

Rongyu Group Co., Ltd. is a Chinese listed company based in Jilin City, Jilin Province. As of 8 November 2016, the company was a constituent of SZSE 1000 Index (as well as sub-index SZSE 700 Index) but not in SZSE Component Index, making the company ranked between the 501st to 1,000th by free float adjusted market capitalization.

== Business overview ==
The company was a producer of energy meters, permanent magnetic AC contactor, moulded case circuit breaker (MCCB), miniature circuit breaker (MCB) and high voltage vacuum breaker. However, the company was under reconstruction since 2015, seeking new area of investment.

In September 2015 the company also announced that they would acquire a company that operates icardpay.com, an online payment system. However, the deal was terminated by the board of directors in June 2016.

On 2 June 2016 the company announced an investment into a private equity fund for CN¥300 million, which later revealed that the fund would acquire Italian football club A.C. Milan. The takeover bid was €520 million. The fund: Sino-Europe Sports Investment Changxing Limited Partnership (Chinese: 中欧体育投资长兴合伙企业(有限合伙)) would raise a maximum of CN¥4.5 billion to finance the bid.

In November 2016 the company was renamed into Rongyu Group. At the same time the company acquired a company (Chinese: 智容科技; pinyin: Zhìróng Kējì) for CN¥250 million.

== Ownership ==
In 2015 the largest shareholder of the company, former chairman Lu Yongxiang (Chinese: 吕永祥), sold his 23.81% stake to a private equity fund (Chinese: 广州汇垠日丰投资合伙企业(有限合伙), literally Guangzhou Huiyin Rifeng Investment Partnership (Limited Partnership)) The deal was completed in 2016. A joint venture of Ping An Insurance and UOB Asset Management, Ping An – UOB Fund Management, was a limited partner of Guangzhou Huiyin Rifeng for 99.9996% stake. The general partner and the manager of the fund was Guangzhou Huiyin Aofeng (Chinese: 广州汇垠澳丰股权投资基金管理有限公司). The largest shareholder of the management company was the Government of Guangzhou City for 30.68% stake.

== Subsidiaries ==
- Chinese: 融钰创新投资（深圳）; lit. 'Rongyu Venture Investment (Shenzhen)' (100%)
- Chinese: 智容科技 (100%)
- Chinese: 北京融钰科技; lit. 'Beijing Rongyu Technology' (100%)
