= AC Milan =

Association football club in Italy

- Full name: Associazione Calcio Milan S.p.A.
- Nicknames: I Rossoneri (The Red and Black); Il Diavolo (The Devil)
- Founded: 18 December 1899; 126 years ago, as Milan Foot-Ball and Cricket Club
- Stadium: San Siro
- Capacity: 75,817 (limited capacity); 80,018 (maximum capacity)
- Owner(s): RedBird Capital Partners (99.93%); Private shareholders (0.07%)
- President: Paolo Scaroni
- Head coach: Ruben Amorim
- League: Serie A
- 2025–26: Serie A, 5th of 20
- Website: www.acmilan.com
Home colours	Away colours	Third colours

Associazione Calcio Milan (Italian pronunciation: [assotʃatˈtsjoːne ˈkaltʃo ˈmiːlan]), commonly referred to as simply Milan (Italian pronunciation: [ˈmiːlan]) in Italy or AC Milan outside of Italy, is an Italian professional football club based in Milan, Lombardy. Founded in 1899, the club competes in Serie A, the top tier of Italian football. In its early history, Milan played its home games in different grounds around the city before moving to its current stadium, the San Siro, in 1926. The stadium, which was built by Milan's second chairman, Piero Pirelli, and has been shared with Inter Milan since 1947, is the largest in Italian football, with a total capacity of 75,817. The club has a long-standing rivalry with Inter, with whom they contest the Derby della Madonnina, one of the most followed derbies in football.

Milan has spent its entire history in Serie A with the exception of the 1980–81 and 1982–83 seasons. Silvio Berlusconi’s 31-year tenure as Milan president was a standout period in the club's history, as they established themselves as one of Europe's most dominant and successful clubs. Milan won 29 trophies during his tenure, securing multiple Serie A and UEFA Champions League titles. During the 1991–92 season, the club notably achieved the feat of being the first team to win the Serie A title without losing a single game. Milan is home to multiple Ballon d'Or winners, and three of the club's players, Marco van Basten, Ruud Gullit, and Frank Rijkaard, were ranked in the top three on the podium for the 1988 Ballon d'Or, an unprecedented achievement in the history of the prize.

Milan is one of the most successful football clubs in the world in terms of total trophies won. Domestically, Milan has won 19 league titles, 5 Coppa Italia titles and 8 Supercoppa Italiana titles. In international competitions, Milan is Italy's most successful club. (Note: Being in South America, Boca Juniors's and Independiente's titles are with CONMEBOL instead of UEFA) The club has won seven European Cup/Champions League titles, making them the competition's second-most successful team behind Real Madrid, and further honours include five UEFA Super Cups, two UEFA Cup Winners' Cups, a joint record (Note: Shared with Barcelona and Real Madrid) two Latin Cups, a joint record (Note: Shared with Boca Juniors, Nacional, Peñarol and Real Madrid) three Intercontinental Cups and one FIFA Club World Cup.

Milan is one of the wealthiest clubs in Italian and world football. It was a founding member of the now-defunct G-14 group of Europe's leading football clubs as well as its replacement, the European Club Association.

== History ==
=== Foundation and early years (1899–1950) ===
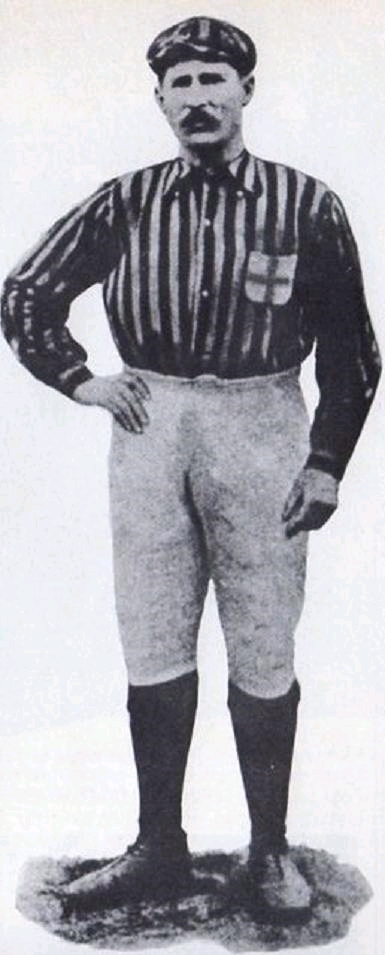
Herbert Kilpin, the club's first captain and one of its founding members

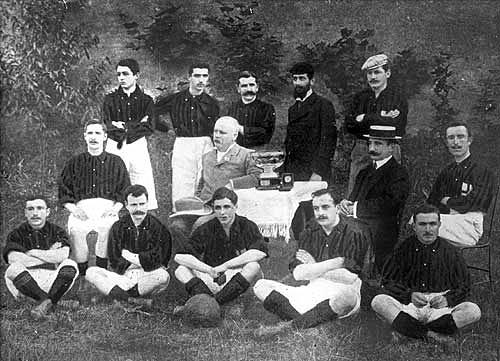
The AC Milan formation that won the Italian championship in 1901

"Saremo una squadra di diavoli. I nostri colori saranno il rosso come il fuoco e il nero come la paura che incuteremo agli avversari."

— 1899, Herbert Kilpin

"We will be a team of devils. Our colours will be red like fire and black like the fear we will invoke in our opponents."

— 1899, Herbert Kilpin

AC Milan was founded as Milan Foot-Ball and Cricket Club in 1899 by English expatriate Herbert Kilpin. The club claims 16 December of that year as their foundation date, but historical evidence seems to suggest that the club was actually founded a few days after, most likely on 18 December. However, with the club's charter being lost, the exact date remains open to debate.

In honour of its English origins, the club has retained the English spelling of the city's name, as opposed to the Italian spelling Milano, which it was forced to bear under the fascist regime. Milan won its first Italian championship in 1901, interrupting a three-year hegemony of Genoa, and a further two in succession in 1906 and 1907. The club proved successful in the first decade of its existence, with several important trophies won, including, among others, the Medaglia del Re three times, the Palla Dapples 23 times and the FGNI tournament five times, a competition organized by the Italian Gymnastics Federation but not officially recognized by the Italian Football Federation.

In 1908, Milan experienced a split caused by internal disagreements over the signing of foreign players, which led to the forming of another Milan-based team, Internazionale. Following these events, Milan did not manage to win a single domestic title until 1950–51, with some exceptions represented by the 1915–16 Coppa Federale and the 1917–18 Coppa Mauro, two tournaments played during the First World War which, especially the former, received a lot of attention and proved to be highly competitive, despite them not being officially recognized by the Italian federation.

=== Return to victory and international affirmation (1950–1970) ===
The 1950s saw the club return to the top of Italian football, headed by the famous Gre-No-Li Swedish trio Gunnar Gren, Gunnar Nordahl and Nils Liedholm. This was one of the club's most successful periods domestically, with the Scudetto going to Milan in 1951, 1955, 1957 and 1959. This decade witnessed also the first European successes of Milan, with the 1951 and 1956 Latin Cup triumphs against Lille and Athletic Bilbao. Milan was also the first Italian club to take part to the newly born European Cup in the 1955–56 season, and reached the final two years later, when they were defeated by Real Madrid.

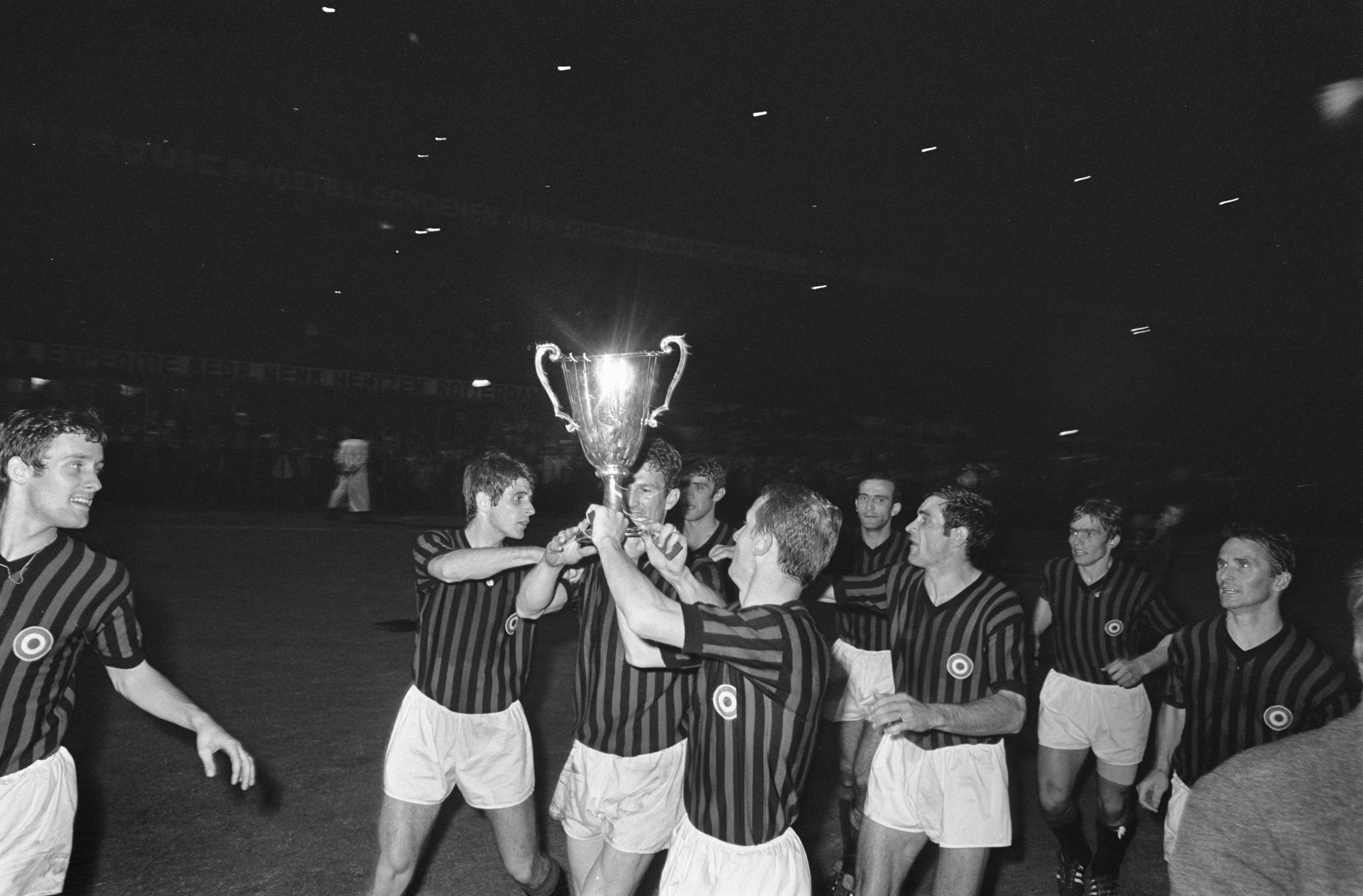
AC Milan celebrating after winning the European Cup Winners' Cup final in 1968

The 1960s began with the debut of Milan's legend Gianni Rivera in 1960: he would remain with the club for the rest of his career for the following 19 seasons. In 1961, Nereo Rocco was appointed as new coach of the club, which under his leadership won immediately a scudetto in 1961–62, followed, in the next season, by Milan's first European Cup triumph, achieved after beating Benfica in the final. This success was repeated in 1969, with a 4–1 win over Ajax in the final, which was followed by the Intercontinental Cup title the same year. During this period Milan also won its ninth scudetto, its first Coppa Italia, with victory over Padova in the 1967 final, and two European Cup Winners' Cups in 1967–68 and 1972–73, after defeating in the last match Hamburg and Leeds United respectively.

=== 10th Scudetto and decline (1970–1986) ===
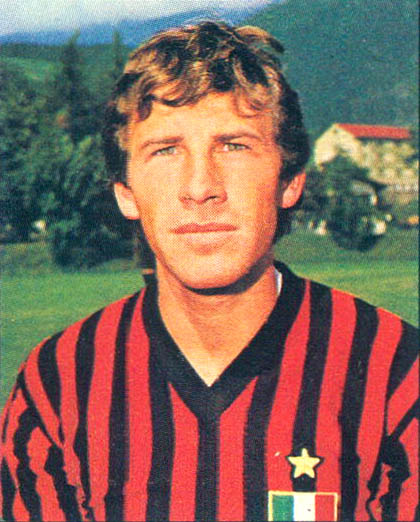
Franco Baresi in 1979

Domestically, the 1970s were characterized by the pursuit of the 10th Serie A title, which grants the winner the Scudetto star. For three years in a row, in 1971, 1972 and 1973, Milan ended up second in the league, after some memorable duels with Inter and Juventus. Finally, the achievement was reached in 1979. The same year saw the retirement of Gianni Rivera and the debut of Franco Baresi, at his first full season with the club.

After this success, the team went into a period of decline. The club in 1980 was involved in the Totonero scandal and as punishment was relegated to Serie B for the first time in its history. The scandal was centred around a betting syndicate paying players and officials to fix the outcome of matches. Milan achieved promotion back to Serie A at the first attempt, winning the 1980–81 Serie B title, but were again relegated a year later as the team ended its 1981–82 campaign in third-last place. In 1983, Milan won the Serie B title for the second time in three seasons to return to Serie A, where they achieved a sixth-place finish in 1983–84.

=== Berlusconi's ownership and international glory (1986–2012) ===
On 20 February 1986, entrepreneur Silvio Berlusconi (who owned Fininvest and Mediaset) acquired the club and saved it from bankruptcy; he invested vast amounts of money, appointed rising manager Arrigo Sacchi at the helm of the Rossoneri and signed Dutch internationals Ruud Gullit, Marco van Basten and Frank Rijkaard. The Dutch trio added an attacking impetus to the team, and complemented the club's Italian internationals Paolo Maldini, Franco Baresi, Alessandro Costacurta and Roberto Donadoni. Under Sacchi, Milan won its first Scudetto in nine years in the 1987–88 season. The following year, the club won its first European Cup in two decades, beating Romanian club Steaua București 4–0 in the final. Milan retained their title with a 1–0 win over Benfica a year later and was the last team to win back-to-back European Cups until Real Madrid's win in 2017. The Milan team of 1988–1990, nicknamed the "Immortals" in the Italian media, has been voted the best club side of all time in a global poll of experts conducted by World Soccer magazine.

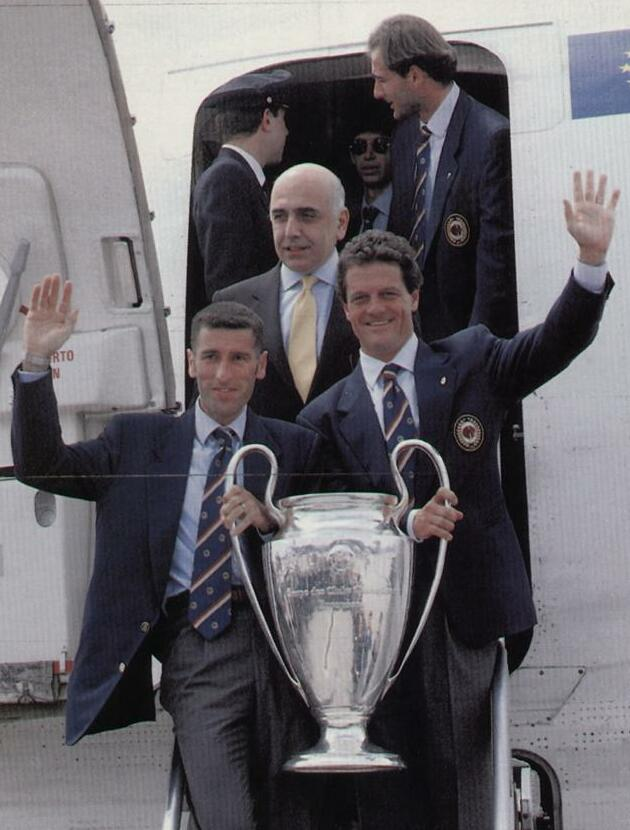
Mauro Tassotti (left) holds the UEFA Champions League trophy along with manager Fabio Capello, following Milan's victory in the 1993–94 edition of the tournament.

After Sacchi left Milan in 1991, he was replaced by the club's former player Fabio Capello whose team won three consecutive Serie A titles between 1992 and 1994, a spell which included a 58-match unbeaten run in Serie A (which earned the team the label "the Invincibles"), and back-to-back UEFA Champions League final appearances in 1993, 1994 and 1995. A year after losing 1–0 to Marseille in the 1993 Champions League final, Capello's team reached its peak in one of Milan's most memorable matches of all time, the famous 4–0 win over Barcelona in the 1994 Champions League final. Capello's side went on to win the 1995–96 league title before he left to manage Real Madrid in 1996. In 1998–99, after a two-year period of decline, Milan lifted its 16th championship in the club's centenary season.

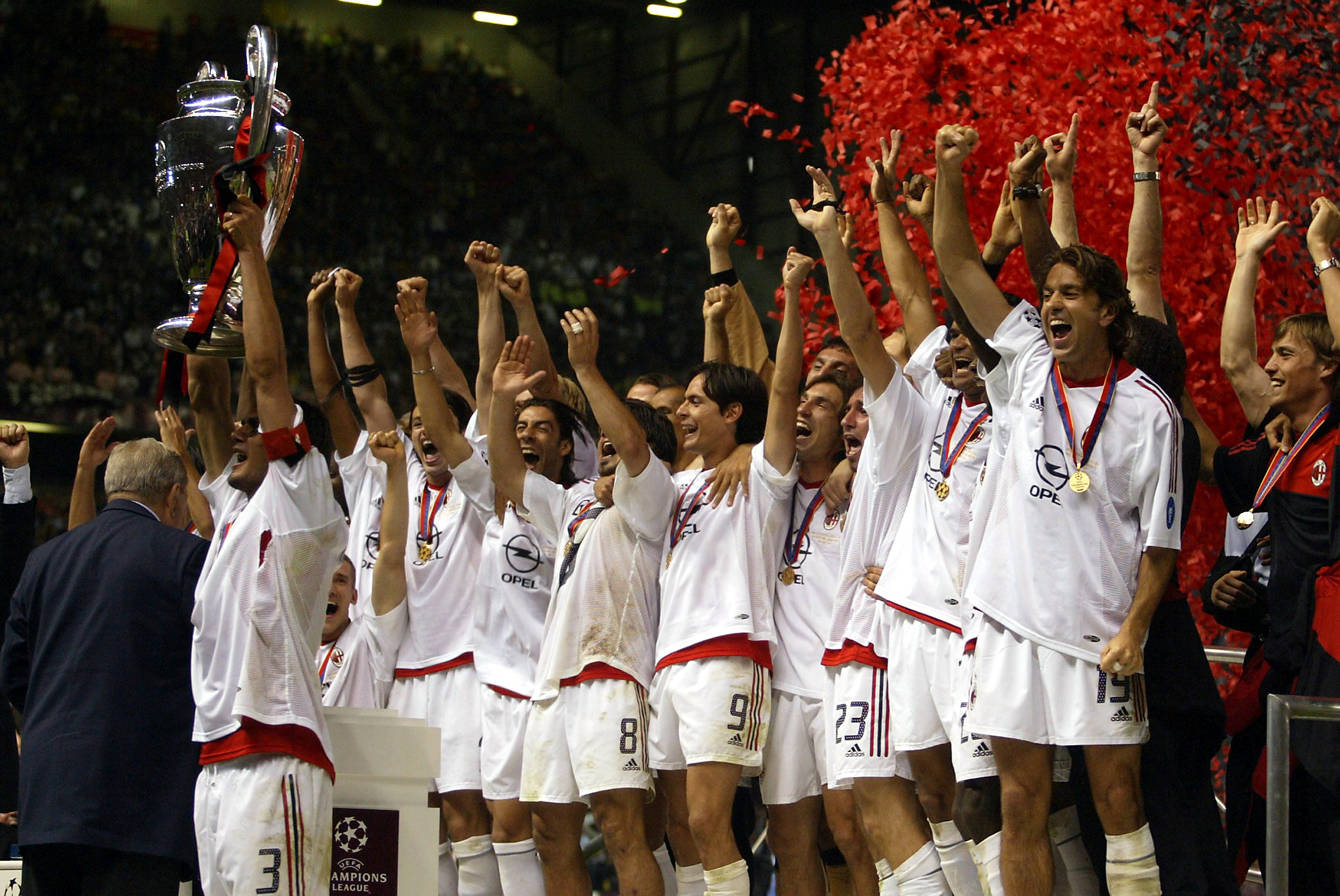
Milan captain Paolo Maldini lifting the European Cup after they won the 2002–03 UEFA Champions League

Milan's next period of success came under another former player, Carlo Ancelotti. After his appointment in November 2001, Ancelotti took Milan to the 2003 Champions League final, where they defeated Juventus on penalties to win the club's sixth European Cup. The team then won the Scudetto in 2003–04 before reaching the 2005 Champions League final, where they were beaten by Liverpool on penalties despite leading 3–0 at half-time. Two years later, the two teams met again in the 2007 Champions League final, with Milan winning 2–1 to lift the title for a seventh time. The team then won its first FIFA Club World Cup in December 2007. In 2009, after becoming Milan's second longest serving manager with 420 matches overseen, Ancelotti left the club to take over as manager at Chelsea.

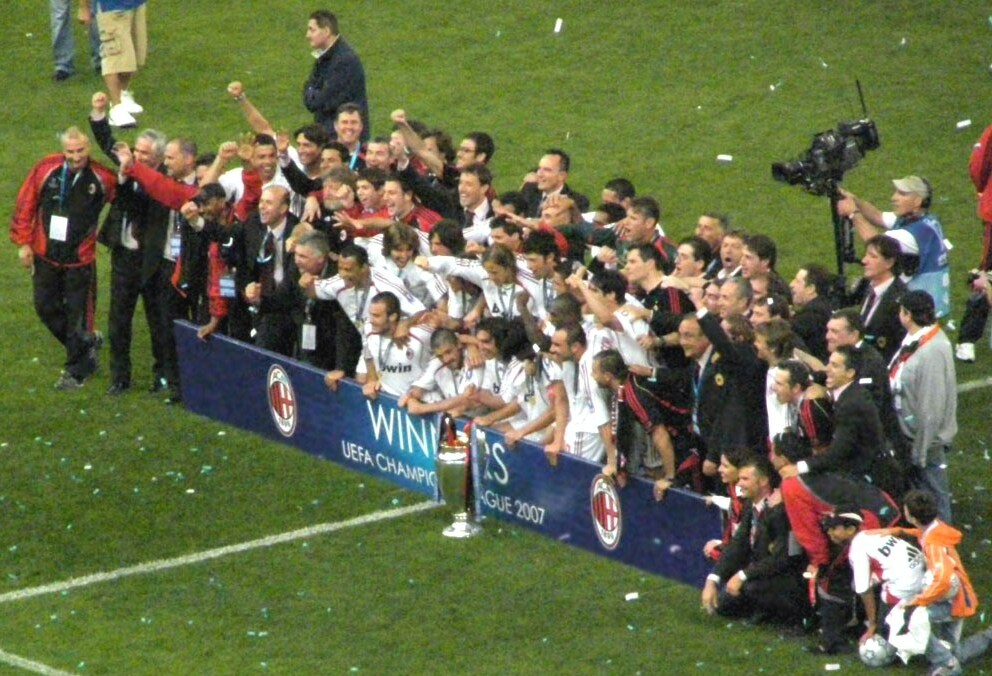
Milan celebrates winning the 2006–07 UEFA Champions League.

During this period, the club was involved in the Calciopoli scandal, where five teams were accused of fixing matches by selecting favourable referees. A police inquiry excluded any involvement of Milan managers; however, the Italian Football Federation (FIGC) unilaterally decided that it had sufficient evidence to charge Milan vice-president Adriano Galliani. As a result, Milan was initially punished with a 15-point deduction and was banned from the 2006–07 UEFA Champions League. An appeal saw that penalty reduced to eight points, which allowed the club to retain its Champions League participation.

Following the aftermath of the Calciopoli, local rivals Internazionale dominated Serie A, winning four Scudetti. However, with the help a strong squad boasting players such as Zlatan Ibrahimović, Robinho and Alexandre Pato joining many of the veterans of the club's mid-decade European successes, Milan recaptured the Scudetto in the 2010–11 Serie A season, their first since the 2003–04 season and 18th overall.

=== Changes in ownership and decline (2012–2019) ===
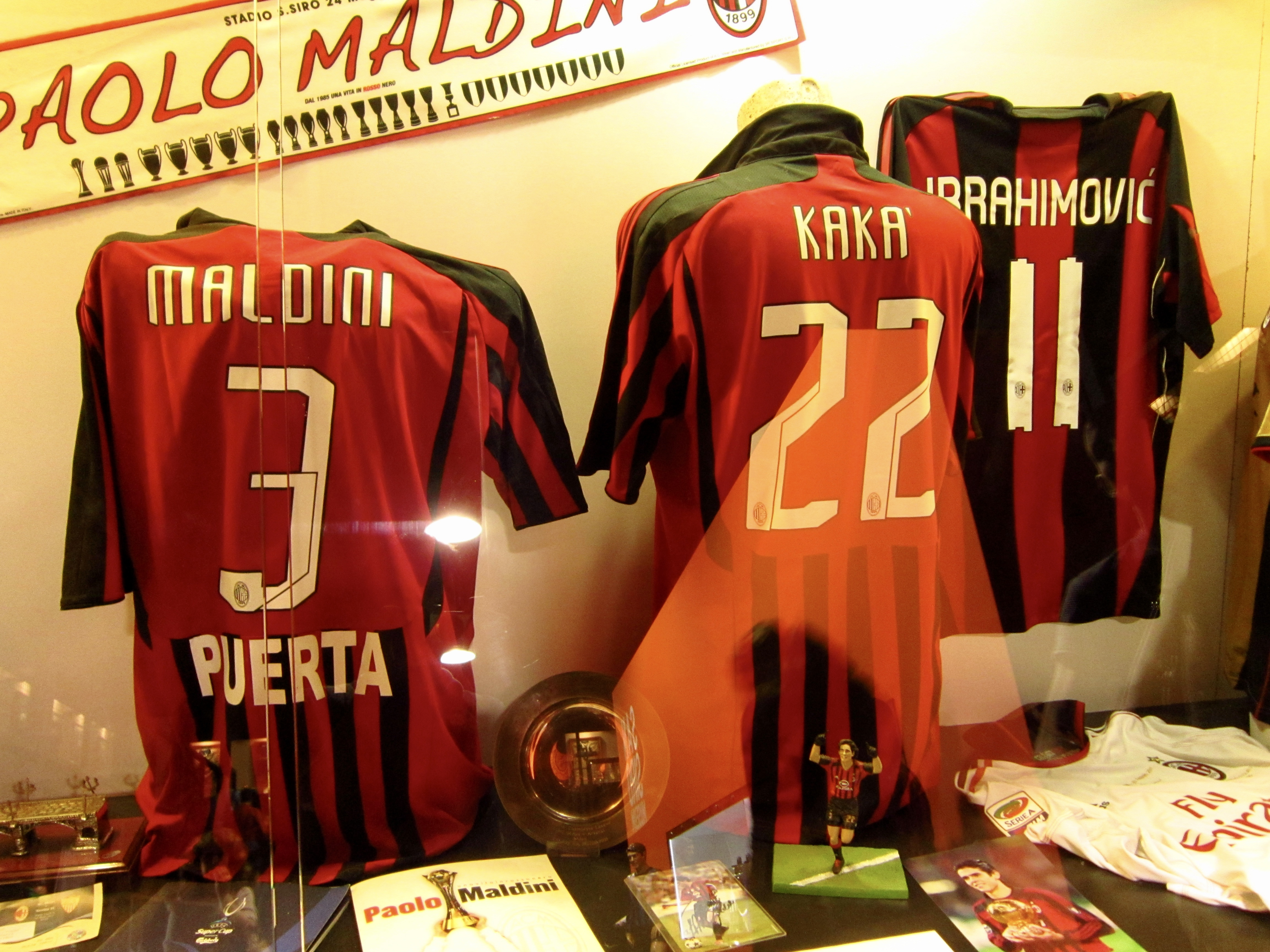
Jerseys of Paolo Maldini (number 3), Kaká (number 22) and Zlatan Ibrahimović (number 11) in the San Siro museum

After their 18th Scudetto, the club declined in performance. Milan failed to qualify to European competitions for a few years, and the only trophy won was the 2016 Supercoppa Italiana, achieved under Vincenzo Montella's coaching after defeating Juventus in the penalty shoot-out.

On 5 August 2016, a new preliminary agreement was signed with the Chinese investment management company Sino-Europe Sports Investment Management Changxing Co., to which Fininvest sold a 99.93% stake of Milan for about €520 million, plus the refurbishment of the club financial debt of €220 million. On 13 April 2017, the deal was completed and Rossoneri Sport Investment Lux became the new direct parent company of the club. In order to finalise the deal, American hedge fund Elliott Management Corporation provided Li with a loan of €303 million (€180 million to complete the payment to Fininvest and €123 million issued directly to the club). On 10 July 2018, Li failed to keep up with his loan repayment plan, neglecting to deposit a €32 million instalment on time in order to refinance the €303 million loan debt owed to the American hedge fund. As a result, In July 2018, chairman Li Yonghong's investment vehicle Rossoneri Champion Inv. Lux. was removed as the shareholder of Rossoneri Sport Inv. Lux., the direct parent company of the club, making the investment vehicle majority controlled by Elliott Management Corporation the sole shareholder of Rossoneri Sport Inv. Lux.

On 27 November 2017, Montella was sacked due to poor results and replaced by former player Gennaro Gattuso. Milan qualified for the 2018–19 UEFA Europa League group stage after finishing sixth in the 2017–18 Serie A season, but were banned by UEFA from European competition due to violations of Financial Fair Play regulations for failure to break-even. Milan appealed to the Court of Arbitration for Sport and the decision was overturned on 20 July 2018.

In Gattuso's first full season in charge, Milan exceeded expectations and spent much of the campaign in the top 4. Despite winning their final 4 games, Milan missed out on the Champions League by one point. After Milan's failure to qualify for the Champions League, Gattuso resigned as manager. On 19 June 2019, Milan hired former Sampdoria manager Marco Giampaolo on a two-year contract. On 28 June 2019, Milan was excluded from the 2019–20 UEFA Europa League for violating Financial Fair Play regulations for the years 2014–2017 and 2015–2018.

=== Recent history (2019–present) ===
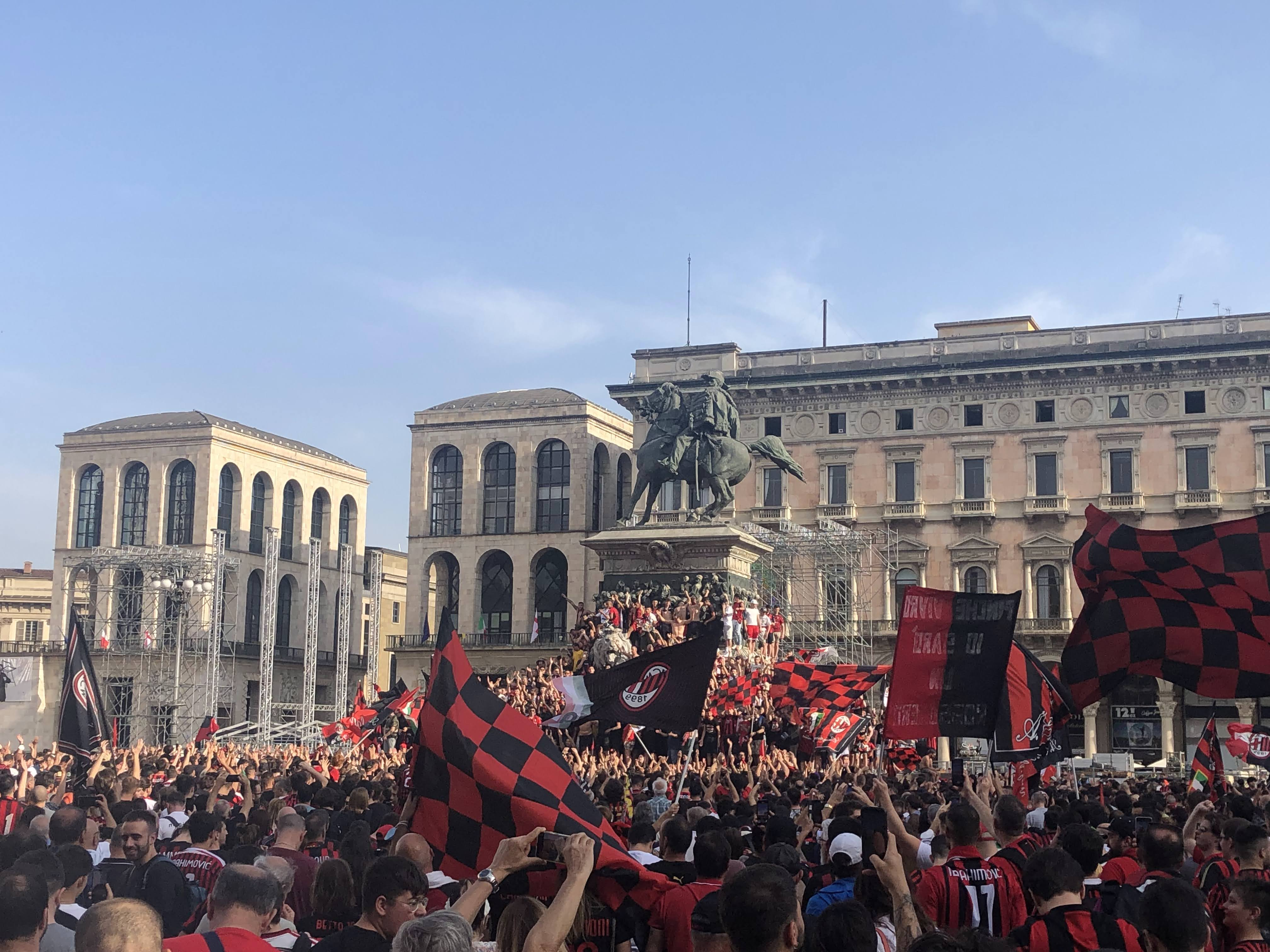
Rossoneri fans celebrating their 2021–22 Serie A win in Piazza del Duomo, Milan

After four months in charge, Giampaolo was sacked after losing four of his first seven games, which was exacerbated by poor performances and a lack of supporter confidence. Stefano Pioli was hired as his replacement. After the restart of the Serie A campaign due to the COVID-19 outbreak, Milan went on a ten match unbeaten streak, winning seven in the process including matches against Juventus, Lazio and Roma. This streak led to Milan abandoning their plans of hiring Ralf Rangnick as their new manager and sporting director, and instead extended Pioli's contract for a further two years. Following a stellar start in the 2020–21 Serie A, which was a continuation of the second half of the previous season, Milan under Pioli in his first full season were led to a second-place finish in the league which was the highest finish for the team since the 2011–12 Serie A. This result allowed Milan to qualify for the 2021–22 UEFA Champions League for the following season, which would become their first appearance in the UEFA Champions League in seven years since their last appearance in the 2013–14 UEFA Champions League.

Milan secured their 19th Italian championship title on the last round of the 2021–22 season, with a club-record tally of 86 points. It was their first league title since the 2010–11 season. In the Serie A Awards, Rafael Leão was named as the league's most valuable player, Mike Maignan as the best goalkeeper, and Pioli as coach of the season. On 1 June 2022, RedBird Capital Partners agreed to acquire AC Milan for $1.3 billion, while Elliott Management Corporation would keep a minority stake. After five seasons with Milan, Pioli stepped down at the end of 2023–24 season and Paulo Fonseca was named as his replacement. Halfway through the 2024–25 season, Fonesca was sacked and replaced by Sérgio Conceição. Despite winning the 2024–25 Supercoppa Italiana, the team finished in eighth place and failed to qualify for European competition for the first time since 2016.

After a final day defeat, finishing fifth in 2025-2026 Serie A season and failing to secure qualification for the 2026-27 UEFA Champions League, Milan announced a reorganisation of its football operations, leading to the departures of head coach Massimiliano Allegri, CEO Giorgio Furlani, Sporting Director Igli Tare and Technical Director Geoffrey Moncada. Ruben Amorim succeeded Allegri as head coach on 16 June 2026.

== Colours and badge ==
Coat of arms of the city of Milan – has been the club badge worn on match kits from the origins to the mid-1940s

Red and black are the colours which have represented the club throughout its entire history. They were chosen by its founder Herbert Kilpin, who took a set of black and red shirts from his former club Notts Olympic with him when moving to Milan, and he claimed the colours represented the players' fiery ardour (red) and the opponents' fear to challenge the team (black). Rossoneri, the team's widely used nickname, literally means "the red & blacks" in Italian, in reference to the colours of the stripes on its jersey.

Another nickname derived from the club's colours is the Devil. An image of a red devil was used as Milan's logo at one point with a Golden Star for Sport Excellence located next to it. As is customary in Italian football, the star above the logo was awarded to the club after winning ten league titles in 1979. The official Milan logos have always displayed the Flag of Milan, which was originally the flag of Saint Ambrose, next to red and black stripes. The modern badge used today represents the club colours and the flag of the Comune di Milano, with the acronym ACM at the top and the foundation year (1899) at the bottom. For what concerns the badge worn on match kits, from the origins to the mid-1940s, it was simply the flag of Milan. For many decades, no club logo was displayed, with the exception of the devil's logo in the early 1980s. The club badge made its definitive appearance on the match strips in the 1995–96, in a form that remained basically unchanged until present days.

Since its foundation, the Milan home kit consisted of a red and black striped shirt, combined with white shorts and black socks; over the course of the decades, only cyclical changes dictated by the fashions of the time affected this pattern, which remained almost unchanged up to present days. In the first decade of the 20th century, the Rossoneri's first kit was a simple silk shirt characterized by thin stripes, with the badge of the city of Milan sewn at heart level. From the 1910s, the stripes were enlarged following a pattern that would remain unchanged until the late 1950s. The 1960s marked a return to the origins, with the use of thin stripes. This style would last until the 1985–86 season, with a small intermezzo from 1980 to 1982, when the stripes changed to a middle size again. A notable innovation occurred in this period. Between the 1979–80 and 1980–81 seasons, the Milan shirt achieved an important record by adding the surnames of the players above the number for the first time in Italian football.

From the 1986–87 season, under the impulse of the new club owner Silvio Berlusconi, the stripes were brought back to a middle size, and the colour of the socks was changed to white, taking the same colour of the shorts. In such a way, Berlusconi aimed at giving the players a more elegant look, as well as making the kit more distinguishably red and black when watched on the television compared to the thin striped kit, which, at a distance and on the television, could mistaken for a full red or brown shirt. This style continued until 1998. Starting from the 1998–99 season, the kits started to be modified on a yearly basis in their design.

Milan's away kit has always been completely white, sometimes adorned with various types of decorations, the most common of which are one vertical or horizontal red and black stripe. The white away kit is considered by both the fans and the club to be a lucky strip in Champions League finals, due to the fact that Milan has won six finals out of eight in an all white strip (losing only to Ajax in 1995 and Liverpool in 2005), and only won one out of three in the home strip. The third strip, which is rarely used, changes yearly, being mostly black with red trimmings.

I can't think of many shirts out there that are as recognisable as Milan's. – Our kits go beyond just the sphere of football.

— In an interview with SoccerBible, Milan player Gianluca Lapadula complimented the iconic design of Rossoneri.

First logo of the "Milan Foot-Ball and Cricket Club", used from 1899 to 1916

Milan logo used between 1936 and 1945

Milan logo used between 1946 and 1979, with few variations over the years

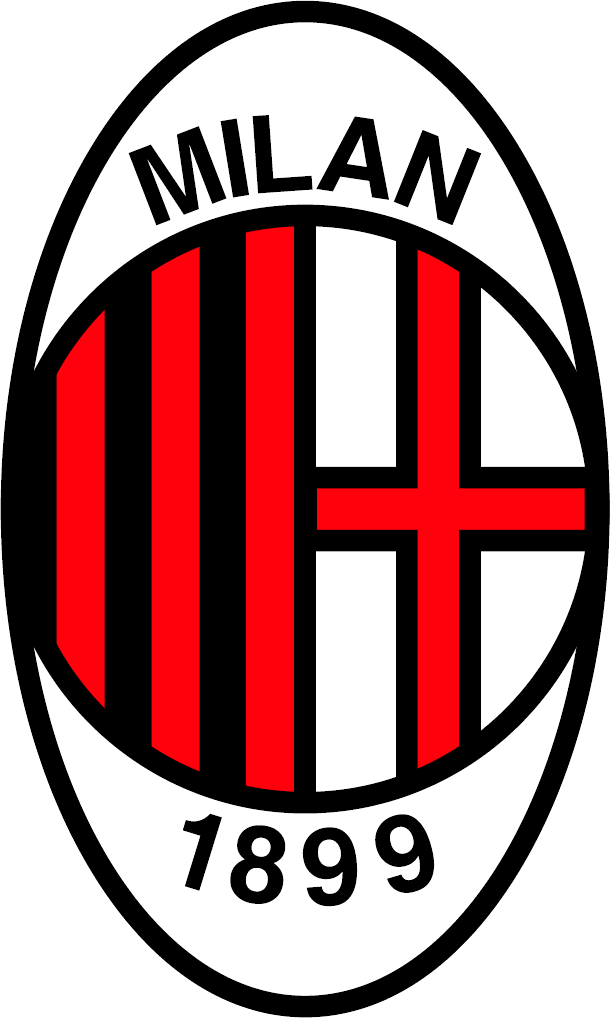
Milan logo used between 1986 and 1998

Milan logo used since 1998

=== Anthem and mascot ===
"AC Milan Anthem – Milan Milan" debuted in 1988 and was composed by Tony Renis and Massimo Guantini.

The official mascot, designed by Warner Bros., is "Milanello", a red devil with the AC Milan kit and a ball.

== Stadiums ==
View of the San Siro in 1934

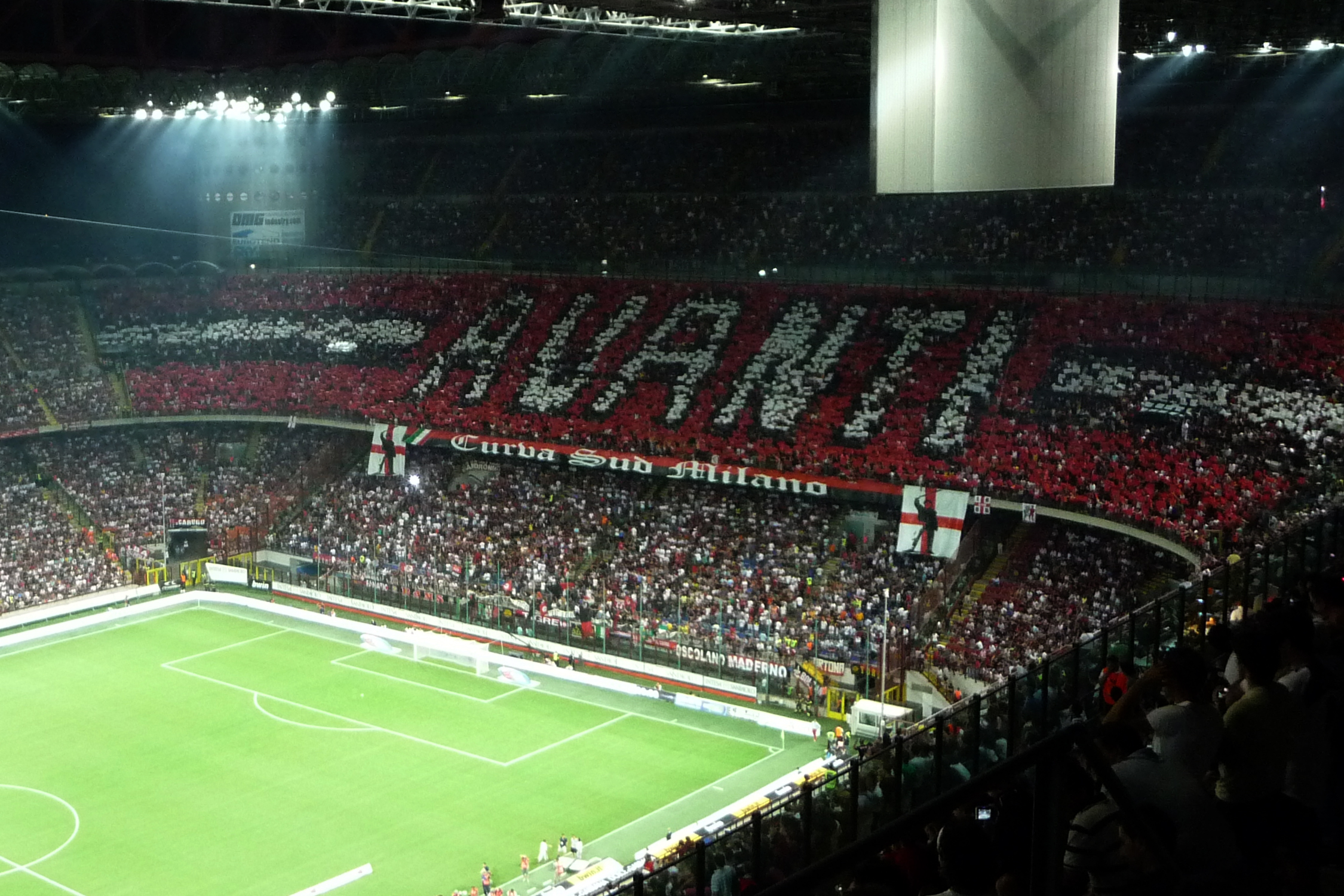
Curva Sud of the San Siro

An aerial view of the San Siro

Milan played their first matches at the Trotter pitch, located where the Milan Central railway station would later be built. It could not be defined as a stadium, as there were no dressing rooms, no stands and no other facilities. In 1903, Milan moved to the Acquabella pitch, where the stands consisted of a section of ground raised for the purpose. Milan played there until 1905. The following year the club moved to the Porta Monforte pitch, where they played until 1914. The stadium was furnished with a ticket office and wooden stands. In the following years Milan played at the Velodromo Sempione from 1914 to 1920, and at the Viale Lombardia stadium from 1920 to 1926. The latter was a modern structure, with a big main stand and which hosted several games of the Italy national football team.

In 1926, Milan moved to the stadium where they still play nowadays: the San Siro. The stadium, officially known as the Stadio Giuseppe Meazza after the former player who represented both Milan and Internazionale, has 75,923 seats. The more commonly used name, "San Siro", is the name of the district where it is located. The San Siro was privately built by funding from Milan's president at the time, Piero Pirelli. Construction was performed by 120 workers, and took 13 1/2 months to complete. The stadium was owned by the club until it was sold to the city in 1935, and since 1947 it has been shared with Internazionale when the other major Milanese club was accepted as joint tenant.

The first game played at the stadium was on 19 September 1926, when Milan lost 6–3 in a friendly match against Internazionale. Milan played its first league game in the San Siro on 19 September 1926, losing 1–2 to Sampierdarenese. From an initial capacity of 35,000 spectators, the stadium has undergone several major renovations, most recently in preparation for the 1990 FIFA World Cup, when its capacity was set to 85,700, all covered with a polycarbonate roof. In the summer of 2008, its capacity was reduced to 80,018, to meet the new standards set by UEFA.

Based on the English model for stadiums, the San Siro is specifically designed for football matches, as opposed to many multi-purpose stadiums used in Serie A. It is therefore renowned in Italy for its fantastic atmosphere during matches, largely thanks to the closeness of the stands to the pitch. The frequent use of flares by supporters contributes to the atmosphere, but the practice has occasionally caused problems.

On 19 December 2005, Milan vice-president and executive director Adriano Galliani announced that the club was seriously working towards a relocation. He stated Milan's new stadium will be largely based on the Veltins-Arena – the home of Schalke 04 in Gelsenkirchen – and will follow the standards of football stadiums in the United States, Germany and Spain. As opposed to many other stadiums in Italy, Milan's new stadium would likely be used for football only, having no athletics track. On 11 December 2014, Barbara Berlusconi announced a proposal to build a property stadium of 42,000 seats in Portello, behind the new HQ of the Rossoneri, and the large square "Piazza Gino Valle". The new village with shopping malls and hotel is located near CityLife district and is served by the metro. On 20 September 2015, however, Silvio Berlusconi called an end to his club's plans to build a new stadium in the city. In 2017, new CEO Marco Fassone stated that the club may look at either staying in the San Siro or moving to a new stadium with the club hierarchy emphasising the need to increase average attendance for home games.

On 27 September 2023, chairman Paolo Scaroni announced the club had filed a proposal to build a new 70,000-seater stadium, alongside the club headquarters and museum in the comune of San Donato Milanese, a suburb south of Milan.

== Supporters ==
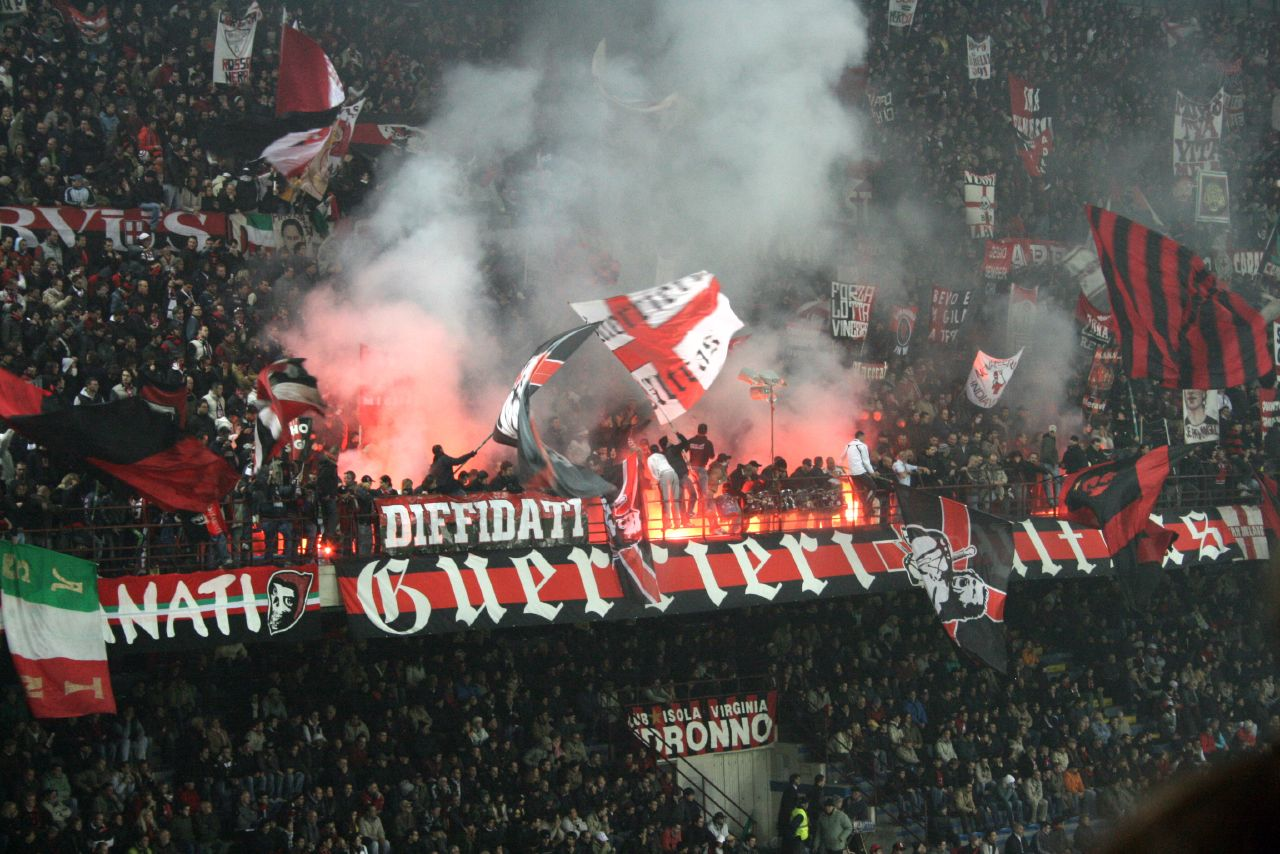
Brigate Rossonere

Milan is one of the most supported football clubs in Italy, according to research conducted by Italian newspaper La Repubblica. Historically, Milan was supported by the city's working class, which granted them the nickname of casciavid [kaʃaˈʋiːt] (which in Milanese dialect means "screwdrivers"), used until the 1960s. On the other hand, crosstown rivals Inter Milan were mainly supported by the more prosperous middle class. The oldest ultras groups in all of Italian football, Fossa dei Leoni, originated in Milan. Currently, the main ultras group within the support base is Brigate Rossonere. Milan ultras have never had any particular political preference, but the media traditionally associated them with the left wing until recently, when Berlusconi's presidency somewhat altered that view.

According to a study from 2010, Milan is the most supported Italian team in Europe and seventh overall, with over 18.4 million fans. It had the thirteenth highest average attendance of European football clubs during the 2019–20 season, behind Borussia Dortmund, Bayern Munich, Manchester United, Barcelona, Real Madrid, Inter, Schalke 04, Tottenham Hotspur, Celtic, Atlético Madrid, West Ham United and Arsenal.

== Club rivalries ==
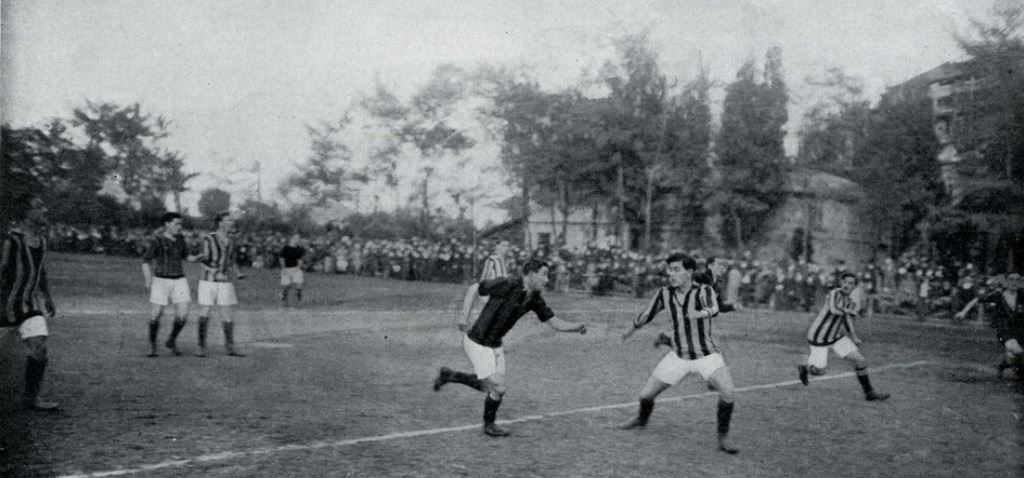
Scene of a Derby della Madonnina in 1915

Milan's main rivalry is with its neighbour club, Inter Milan. Both clubs meet in the widely anticipated Derby della Madonnina twice every Serie A season. The name of the derby refers to the Blessed Virgin Mary, whose statue atop the Milan Cathedral is one of the city's main attractions. The first match was held in the final of the Chiasso Cup of 1908, a football tournament played in Canton Ticino, Switzerland, on 18 October of that year; the Rossoneri won 2–1. The rivalry reached its highest point in the 1960s, when the two clubs dominated the scene both domestically and internationally. In Italy, they cumulatively won five Serie A titles, while internationally they collected four European cups. On the bench it showcased the clash of two different approaches to Catenaccio by the two managers: Nereo Rocco for Milan and Helenio Herrera for Inter. On the pitch, the stage was taken by some of the biggest stars the Italian Serie A could offer: players such as Gianni Rivera, Giovanni Trapattoni and José Altafini for Milan and Sandro Mazzola, Giacinto Facchetti and Luis Suárez for Inter. The match usually creates a lively atmosphere, with numerous (often humorous or offensive) banners unfolded before the start of the game. Flares are commonly present and contribute to the spectacle, but they have occasionally led to problems, including the abandonment of the second leg of the 2004–05 Champions League quarter-final match between Milan and Inter on 12 April 2005, after a flare thrown from the crowd by an Inter supporter struck Milan goalkeeper Dida on the shoulder.

Their rivalry with Juventus is between the two most titled teams in Italy. The challenge confronts also two of the clubs with the greater basin of supporters as well as those with the greatest turnover and stock market value in the country. Milan and Juventus were often fighting for the top positions of the Serie A standings. Some important periods marked by this rivalry were the early 1950s, which saw the two teams alternating each other as Serie A champions (the two clubs won seven titles in the decade), and big duels between forwards, with the Swedish Gre-No-Li on the rossoneri side and the trio formed by Giampiero Boniperti, John Hansen and Karl Aage Præst on the bianconeri side; the early 1970s, when for two consecutive seasons, 1971-72 and 1972-73, Milan lost the scudetto to Juventus by just one point; the 1990s, when the two clubs dominated the league by winning eight (consecutive) titles out of ten, lining up players that marked the history of football in their era and in the whole history; and finally in the 2000s, when, between the 2004–05 and 2005–06 seasons, the two clubs contested each other the Serie A titles, both won by Juventus but then revoked due to the Calciopoli scandal. The only match played by the two teams in European competitions was the 2003 UEFA Champions League final, the first such final between two Italian clubs, won by Milan at the penalties, which granted Milan the sixth Champions League title of their history.

The rivalry with Genoa started at the dawn of the 20th century, when the two clubs repeatedly faced each other for the Italian championship and other important trophies of the time. It then continued in the 1981-82 Serie A season, when Genoa avoided relegation in Naples just a few minutes from the final whistle of the last game of the season condemning the Rossoneri to the second Serie B season of their history. The rivalry worsened in 1995 after Genoa fan Vincenzo Spagnolo was stabbed to death by a Milan supporter. Milan also has rivalries with Fiorentina, Atalanta and Napoli.

== Popular culture ==
In the movie industry, among the films dedicated to the Rossoneri team is Sunday Heroes (1953), by director Mario Camerini, in which the main plot pivots around a fictional football match between the Rossoneri and a club on the brink of relegation. In the film, in addition to the coach Lajos Czeizler, many of the Milan players of the time appear, including Lorenzo Buffon, Carlo Annovazzi and the entire Gre-No-Li trio.

Milan as a fan base and some of their most popular players appeared in several Italian comedy movies. Among them the following are worth mentioning: Eccezzziunale... veramente, Really SSSupercool: Chapter Two (whose cast includes Paolo Maldini, Gennaro Gattuso, Massimo Ambrosini, Dida, Andriy Shevchenko and Alessandro Costacurta) and Tifosi (whose cast includes Franco Baresi).

=== Milan TV ===
On 16 December 1999, on the day of the centenary of the club's foundation, Milan Channel was launched. The subscription-based television channel broadcasts news, events and vintage matches of the club. It is the first Italian thematic channel entirely dedicated to a football team. On 1 July 2016, the channel took on the new name of Milan TV, renewing its graphics and logo.

=== Forza Milan! ===
In the editorial field, Forza Milan! was the official magazine of the club for over half a century. It was founded in 1963 by journalist Gino Sansoni and published by Panini. Issued with a monthly cadence, it covered all events surrounding Milan, with interviews to its protagonists, special posters, reports of official and friendly matches. Under the direction of Gigi Vesigna it reached a monthly circulation of 130,000 copies. The last issue of the magazine was published in June 2018.

== Honours ==
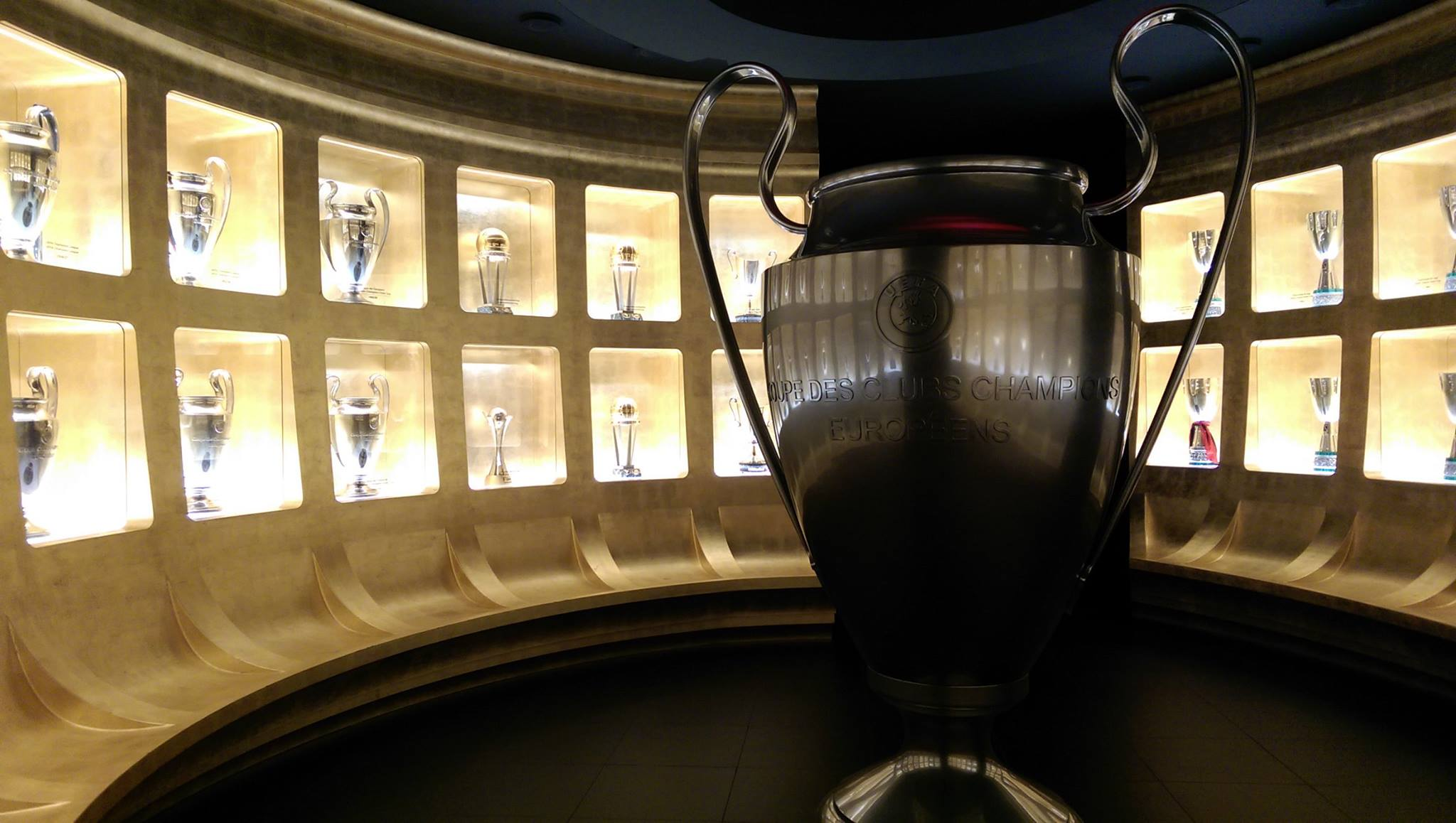
A partial view of the club's trophy room at the Mondo Milan Museum

With a total of 32 domestic honours, Milan is one of the most successful clubs in Italy. The club won its first Serie A title in 1901 with its most recent coming in 2022. Milan's tenth scudetto win meant that it earned the right to place a star on its jersey in recognition of this.

Milan is the most successful Italian club in international football with 20 major international trophies won (18 of them organised by UEFA and FIFA), and the third most successful in Europe overall after Real Madrid and Barcelona. They have won the European Cup/Champions League seven times, an Italian record and only surpassed by Real Madrid, with their most recent coming in 2007. Milan's fifth European Cup win, in 1994, meant that the club was awarded the trophy permanently and is allowed to display a multiple-winner badge on its shirt. The club also holds a joint record of two wins in the Latin Cup and a joint record of three wins in the Intercontinental Cup. In 2007, Milan won the FIFA Club World Cup for the first time, completing an international treble of Champions League, Super Cup and Club World Cup.

AC Milan honours
Type	Competition	Titles	Seasons
Domestic	Serie A	19	1901, 1906, 1907, 1950–51, 1954–55, 1956–57, 1958–59, 1961–62, 1967–68, 1978–79, 1987–88, 1991–92, 1992–93, 1993–94, 1995–96, 1998–99, 2003–04, 2010–11, 2021–22
Domestic	Serie B	2	1980–81, 1982–83
Domestic	Coppa Italia	5	1966–67, 1971–72, 1972–73, 1976–77, 2002–03
Domestic	Supercoppa Italiana	8	1988, 1992, 1993, 1994, 2004, 2011, 2016, 2024
Continental	European Cup / UEFA Champions League	7	1962–63, 1968–69, 1988–89, 1989–90, 1993–94, 2002–03, 2006–07
Continental	European Cup Winners' Cup	2	1967–68, 1972–73
Continental	European Super Cup / UEFA Super Cup	5	1989, 1990, 1994, 2003, 2007
Continental	Latin Cup	2^{s}	1951, 1956
Worldwide	Intercontinental Cup	3^{s}	1969, 1989, 1990
Worldwide	FIFA Club World Cup	1	2007

- record
- ^{s} shared record

== Club statistics and records ==
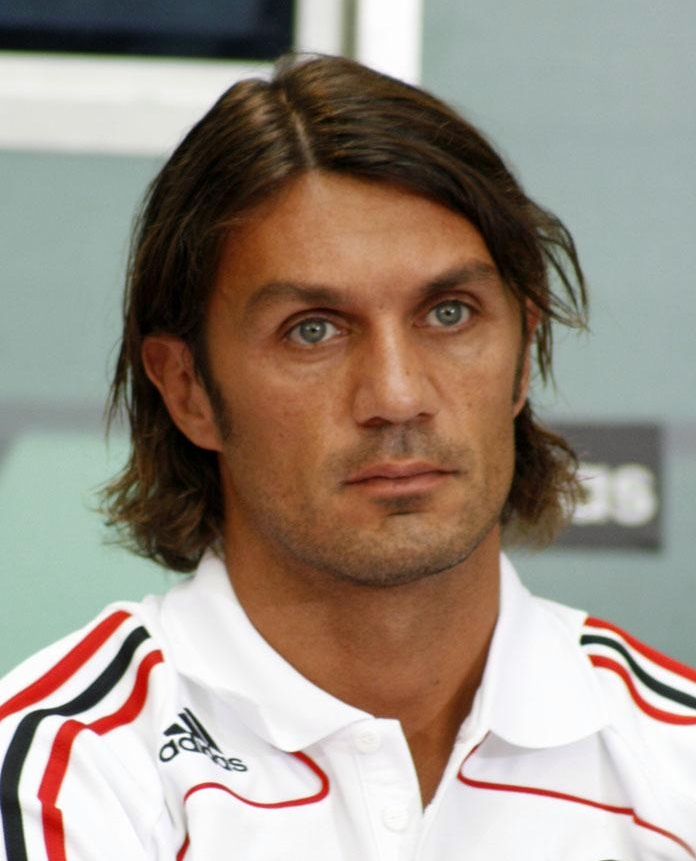
Paolo Maldini made a record 902 appearances for Milan, including 647 in Serie A.

Paolo Maldini holds the records for both total appearances and Serie A appearances for Milan, with 902 official games played in total and 647 in Serie A (as of 31 May 2009, not including playoff matches), the latter being an all-time Serie A record.

Swedish forward Gunnar Nordahl scored 38 goals in the 1950–51 season, 35 of which were in Serie A, setting an Italian football and club record. He went on to become Milan's all-time top goalscorer, scoring 221 goals for the club in 268 games. He is followed in second place by Andriy Shevchenko with 175 goals in 322 games, and Gianni Rivera in third place, who has scored 164 goals in 658 games. Rivera is also Milan's youngest ever goalscorer, scoring in a league match against Juventus at just 17 years.

Legendary tactician Nereo Rocco, the first proponent of catenaccio in the country, was Milan's longest-serving manager, sitting on the bench for over nine years (in two spells) in the 1960s and early 1970s, winning the club's first European Cup triumphs. Italian Prime Minister Silvio Berlusconi, who purchased the club in 1986, is Milan's longest-serving president (23 years, due to a two-year vacancy between 2004 and 2006).

The first official match in which Milan participated was in the Third Federal Football Championship, the predecessor of Serie A, losing 3–0 to Torinese. Milan's largest ever victory was 13–0 against Audax Modena, in a league match at the 1914–15 season. Its heaviest defeat was recorded in the league at the 1922–23 season, beaten 0–8 by Bologna.

During the 1991–92 season, the club achieved the feature of being the first team to win the Serie A title without losing a single game. Previously, only Perugia had managed to go unbeaten over an entire Serie A season (1978–79), but finished second in the table. In total, Milan's unbeaten streak lasted 58 games, starting with a 0–0 draw against Parma on 26 May 1991 and coincidentally ending with a 1–0 home loss to Parma on 21 March 1993. This is a Serie A record, as well as the third-longest unbeaten run in top flight European football, coming in behind Steaua București's record of 104 unbeaten games and Celtic's 68 game unbeaten run.

Since 2007, along with Boca Juniors, Milan has won more FIFA recognised international club titles than any other club in the world with 18 titles. They were overtaken by Al Ahly from Egypt after their 2014 CAF Confederation Cup win.

The sale of Kaká to Real Madrid in 2009 broke the eight-year-old world football transfer record held by Zinedine Zidane, costing the Spanish club €67 million (about £56 million). That record, however, lasted for less than a month, broken by Cristiano Ronaldo's £80 million transfer. This record, however, is in terms of nominal British pound rates, not adjusted to inflation or the real value of the euro. Madrid bought Zidane for €77.5 million in 2001, about £46 million at that time.

== Players ==
=== Current squad ===
As of 31 August 2026

Note: Flags indicate national team as defined under FIFA eligibility rules; some limited exceptions apply. Players may hold more than one non-FIFA nationality.

No.	Pos.	Nation	Player
1	GK	ITA	Pietro Terracciano
2	DF	ECU	Pervis Estupiñán
5	DF	BEL	Koni De Winter
8	MF	ENG	Ruben Loftus-Cheek
9	FW	POR	Gonçalo Ramos
11	MF	USA	Christian Pulisic
12	MF	FRA	Adrien Rabiot
13	DF	FRA	Sankhoun Diawara
14	MF	CRO	Luka Modrić
16	GK	FRA	Mike Maignan (captain)
20	MF	ENG	Omari Hutchinson (on loan from Nottingham Forest)
21	MF	NGR	Samuel Chukwueze
22	FW	BEL	Diego Moreira
23	DF	ENG	Fikayo Tomori

No.	Pos.	Nation	Player
28	MF	ITA	Christian Comotto
30	MF	SUI	Ardon Jashari
31	DF	SRB	Strahinja Pavlović
33	DF	ITA	Davide Bartesaghi
34	DF	ESP	Mario Gila
35	DF	BUL	Valeri Vladimirov
42	DF	ITA	Filippo Terracciano
46	DF	ITA	Matteo Gabbia (vice-captain)
56	MF	BEL	Alexis Saelemaekers
70	MF	ITA	Alphadjo Cisse
73	FW	ITA	Francesco Camarda
80	MF	USA	Yunus Musah
96	GK	ITA	Lorenzo Torriani

=== Milan Futuro and Primavera ===
As of 25 October 2026

The following players are part of both Milan Futuro or AC Milan Youth Sector squads and have been called-up to AC Milan for any official competition match. Shirt numbers refer to main squad.
Note: Flags indicate national team as defined under FIFA eligibility rules; some limited exceptions apply. Players may hold more than one non-FIFA nationality.

No.	Pos.	Nation	Player
37	GK	ITA	Matteo Pittarella
40	FW	ITA	Lorenzo Ossola
41	GK	FRA	Léo Paul Bouyer
47	DF	ITA	Nirash Perera

No.	Pos.	Nation	Player
48	DF	SEN	El Hadji Malick Cissé
49	FW	ITA	Luca Menon
55	MF	NED	Silvano Vos

=== Other players under contract ===
As of 1 September 2026

Note: Flags indicate national team as defined under FIFA eligibility rules; some limited exceptions apply. Players may hold more than one non-FIFA nationality.

No.	Pos.	Nation	Player
—	MF	COD	Warren Bondo

=== Out on loan ===
As of 1 September 2026

Note: Flags indicate national team as defined under FIFA eligibility rules; some limited exceptions apply. Players may hold more than one non-FIFA nationality.

No.	Pos.	Nation	Player
—	DF	SUI	Zachary Athekame (at Lyon until 30 June 2027)
—	DF	GER	David Odogu (at Toulouse until 30 June 2027)
—	MF	FRA	Youssouf Fofana (at Sevilla until 30 June 2027)
—	MF	ITA	Samuele Ricci (at Como until 30 June 2027)
—	MF	ITA	Jacopo Sardo (at Pescara until 30 June 2027)

No.	Pos.	Nation	Player
—	MF	ITA	Kevin Zeroli (at Südtirol until 30 June 2027)
—	FW	MEX	Santiago Giménez (at Porto until 30 June 2027)
—	FW	MNE	Andrej Kostić (at Sparta Rotterdam until 30 June 2027)
—	FW	FRA	Christopher Nkunku (at RB Leipzig until 30 June 2027)

=== Retired numbers ===
No.	Player	Nationality	Position	Milan debut	Last match	Ref
3	Paolo Maldini	Italy	Centre back / Left back	20 January 1985	31 May 2009	
6	Franco Baresi	Italy	Sweeper	23 April 1978	1 June 1997	

== Coaching staff ==
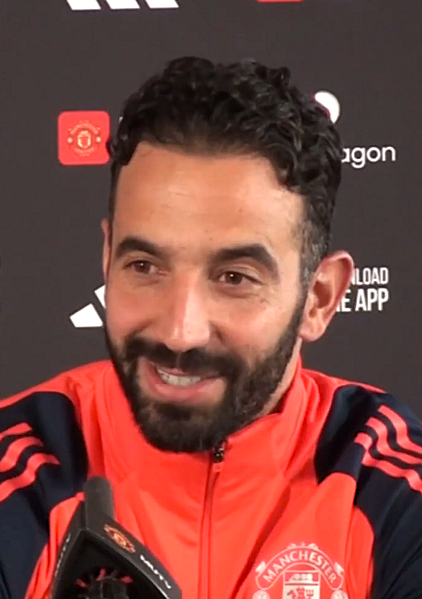
Ruben Amorim is the head coach of the club.

As of 16 June 2026

Position	Name
Head coach	(Portugal) Ruben Amorim
Assistant coaches	(Portugal) Carlos Fernandes
Assistant coaches	(Portugal) Adélio Cândido
Assistant coaches	(Portugal) Emanuel Ferro
Match analyst	(Italy) Simone Bottitta
Goalkeeper coach	(Portugal) Jorge Vital
Fitness coaches	(Italy) Andrea Riboli
Fitness coaches	(Portugal) Paulo Barreira
Physiotherapist	(Italy) Stefano Grani
Head of medical	(Italy) Stefano Mazzoni
Sports scientist	(Italy) Marco Luison
Sporting director	Vacant
Technical director	Vacant
Executive assistant	(Germany) Hendrik Almstadt
Academy coach	(Italy) Vincenzo Vergine

== Chairmen and managers ==
=== Chairmen history ===
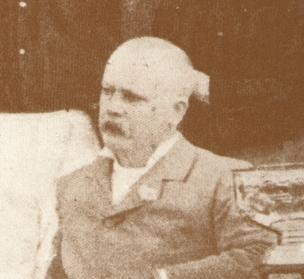
Alfred Edwards, the first chairman of the club from 1899 to 1909.

Milan has had numerous chairmen (Note: The Italian word for chairman of the board of directors was Presidente. However, it was not equal to the English meaning of president of a company.) over the course of its history. Here is a complete list of them.

Name	Years
Alfred Edwards	1899–1909
Piero Pirelli	1909–1928
Luigi Ravasco	1928–1930
Mario Benazzoli	1930–1933
Commission	1933
Luigi Ravasco	1933–1935
Pietro Annoni	1935–1936
Regency	1936
Emilio Colombo	1936–1939
Achille Invernizzi	1939–1940
Commission	1940–1944

Name	Years
Regency	1944–1945
Umberto Trabattoni	1945–1954
Andrea Rizzoli	1954–1963
Felice Riva	1963–1965
Commission	1965–1966
Luigi Carraro	1966–1967
Franco Carraro	1967–1971
Federico Sordillo	1971–1972
Albino Buticchi	1972–1975
Bruno Pardi	1975–1976
Vittorio Duina	1976–1977

Name	Years
Felice Colombo	1977–1980
Gaetano Morazzoni	1980–1982
Giuseppe Farina	1982–1986
Rosario Lo Verde	1986
Silvio Berlusconi	1986–2004
Regency	2004–2006
Silvio Berlusconi	2006–2008
Regency	2008–2017
Li Yonghong	2017–2018
Paolo Scaroni	2018–

=== Managerial history ===
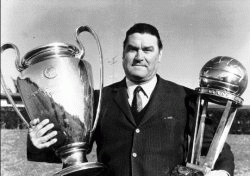
Nereo Rocco, with 10 trophies, was the most successful manager in the history of AC Milan.

Below is a list of Milan managers from 1900 until the present day.

Name	Nationality	Years
Herbert Kilpin	(England)	1900–1908
Daniele Angeloni	(Italy)	1906–1907
Technical Commission	(Italy)	1907–1910
Giovanni Camperio	(Italy)	1910–1911
Technical Commission	(Italy)	1911–1914
Guido Moda	(Italy)	1915–1922
Ferdi Oppenheim	(Austria)	1922–1924
Vittorio Pozzo	(Italy)	1924–1926
Guido Moda	(Italy)	1926
Herbert Burgess	(England)	1926–1928
Engelbert König	(Austria)	1928–1931
József Bánás	(Hungary)	1931–1933
József Viola	(Hungary)	1933–1934
Adolfo Baloncieri	(Italy)	1934–1937
William Garbutt	(England)	1937
Hermann Felsner József Bánás	(Federal State of Austria) (Hungary)	1937–1938
József Viola	(Hungary)	1938–1940
Guido Ara Antonio Busini	(Italy) (Italy)	1940–1941
Mario Magnozzi	(Italy)	1941–1943
Giuseppe Santagostino	(Italy)	1943–1945
Adolfo Baloncieri	(Italy)	1945–1946
Giuseppe Bigogno	(Italy)	1946–1949
Lajos Czeizler	(Hungary)	1949–1952
Gunnar Gren	(Sweden)	1952
Mario Sperone	(Italy)	1952–1953
Béla Guttmann	(Hungary)	1953–1954
Antonio Busini	(Italy)	1954
Hector Puricelli	(Uruguay)	1954–1956
Giuseppe Viani	(Italy)	1957–1960
Paolo Todeschini	(Italy)	1960–1961
Nereo Rocco	(Italy)	1961–1963
Luis Carniglia	(Argentina)	1963–1964
Nils Liedholm	(Sweden)	1963–1966
Giovanni Cattozzo	(Italy)	1966
Arturo Silvestri	(Italy)	1966–1967
Nereo Rocco	(Italy)	1967–1972
Cesare Maldini	(Italy)	1973–1974
Giovanni Trapattoni	(Italy)	1974
Gustavo Giagnoni	(Italy)	1974–1975

Name	Nationality	Years
Nereo Rocco	(Italy)	1975
Paolo Barison	(Italy)	1975–1976
Giovanni Trapattoni	(Italy)	1976
Giuseppe Marchioro	(Italy)	1976–1977
Nereo Rocco	(Italy)	1977
Nils Liedholm	(Sweden)	1977–1979
Massimo Giacomini	(Italy)	1979–1981
Italo Galbiati	(Italy)	1981
Luigi Radice	(Italy)	1981–1982
Italo Galbiati	(Italy)	1982
Francesco Zagatti	(Italy)	1982
Ilario Castagner	(Italy)	1982–1984
Italo Galbiati	(Italy)	1984
Nils Liedholm	(Sweden)	1984–1987
Fabio Capello	(Italy)	1987
Arrigo Sacchi	(Italy)	1987–1991
Fabio Capello	(Italy)	1991–1996
Óscar Tabárez Giorgio Morini	(Uruguay) (Italy)	1996
Arrigo Sacchi	(Italy)	1996–1997
Fabio Capello	(Italy)	1997–1998
Alberto Zaccheroni	(Italy)	1998–2001
Cesare Maldini Mauro Tassotti	(Italy)	2001
Fatih Terim Antonio Di Gennaro	(Turkey) (Italy)	2001
Carlo Ancelotti	(Italy)	2001–2009
Leonardo	(Brazil)	2009–2010
Massimiliano Allegri	(Italy)	2010–2014
Mauro Tassotti (caretaker)	(Italy)	2014
Clarence Seedorf	(Netherlands)	2014
Filippo Inzaghi	(Italy)	2014–2015
Siniša Mihajlović	(Serbia)	2015–2016
Cristian Brocchi	(Italy)	2016
Vincenzo Montella	(Italy)	2016–2017
Gennaro Gattuso	(Italy)	2017–2019
Marco Giampaolo	(Italy)	2019
Stefano Pioli	(Italy)	2019–2024
Paulo Fonseca	(Portugal)	2024
Sérgio Conceição	(Portugal)	2024–2025
Massimiliano Allegri	(Italy)	2025–2026
Ruben Amorim	(Portugal)	2026–

== AC Milan sponsorships ==
=== Shirt sponsors ===
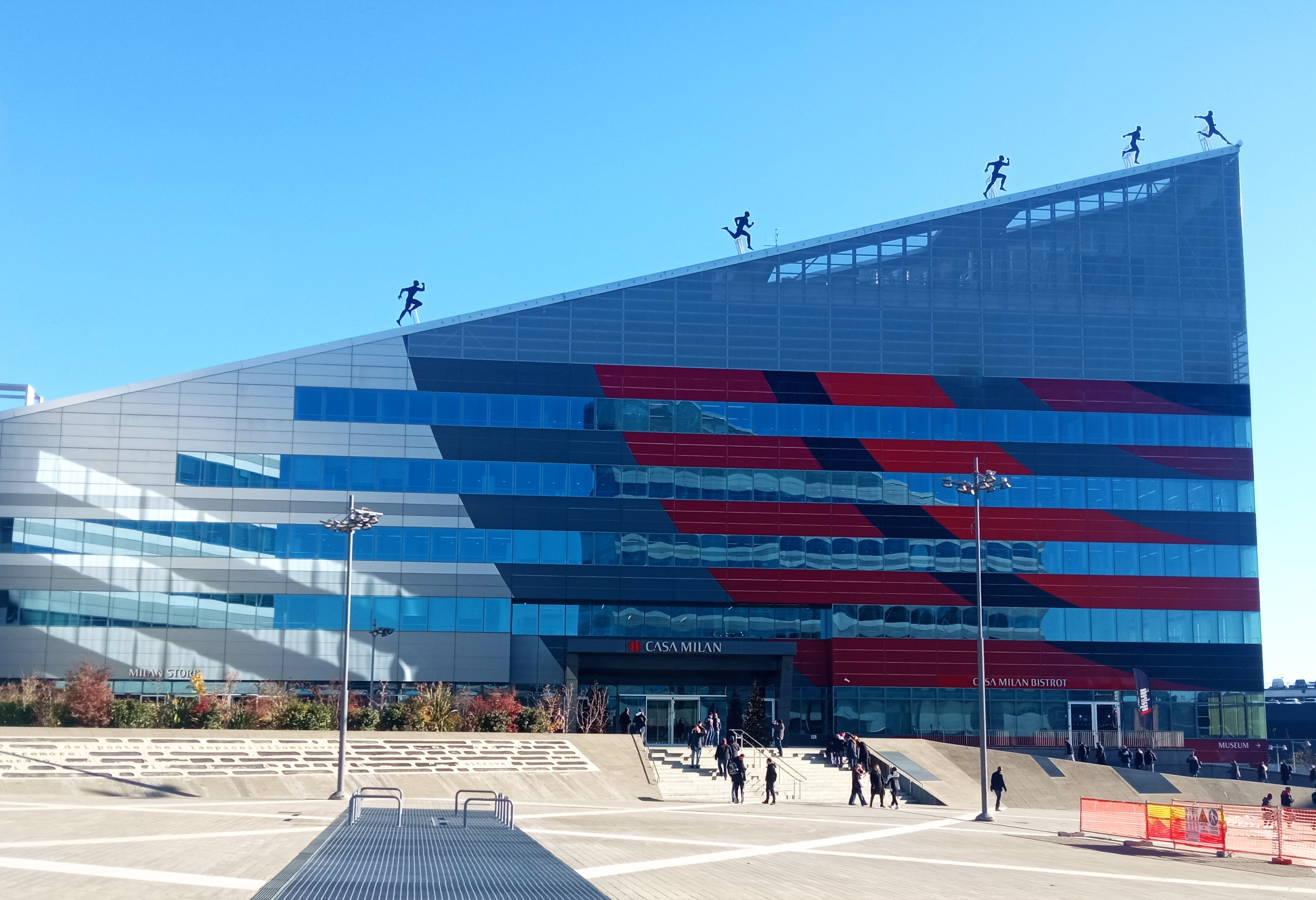
AC Milan headquarters in Milan

Emirates is the current main sponsor for Milan's shirt starting from the 2010–11 season and through to the 2019–20 season. Previously, German car manufacturer Opel (owned by General Motors) had sponsored Milan for 12 seasons. For most of those 12 years, "Opel" was displayed on the front of the shirt, but in the 2003–04 and the 2005–06 seasons respectively, "Meriva" and "Zafira" (two cars from the company's range) were displayed.

=== Fashion and luxury ===
As a team based in the world's most important fashion capital, AC Milan is known for its partnerships with Italian high fashion brands. Dolce & Gabbana have been closely associated with the team since the Italian luxury brand designed AC Milan's official off-field suits in 2004. The collaboration continued for over 10 years.

In 2016, it was announced that Boglioli would be its style partner replacing Diesel. The partnership continued until the 2019/2020 season. In 2020, Harmont & Blaine became the Rossoneri's new style partner. In 2021, Harmont & Blaine released a special AC Milan capsule collection as part of the collaboration. In 2022, AC Milan announced a partnership with Italian luxury streetwear brand Off-White.

Beyond fashion, AC Milan partnered with Italian luxury jewelry company Damiani in 2018 designating them as the team's new "luxury partner". The same year, luxury leather maker Piquadro became the team's "official tech travel" partner. In 2020, Etro became AC Milan's official travel accessories supplier. The partnership was later renewed.

=== Online betting ===
In 2022, AC Milan announced that the online betting and casino company Betsson would be its official betting partner with exclusive access to AC Milan IP in Latin America.

=== Kit deals ===
The current shirts are supplied by Puma. Previously it was supplied by German sportswear manufacturer Adidas, whose deal was scheduled to run until 2023. The deal made Adidas the official manufacturer of all kits, training equipment and replica outfits. However, an early termination of the deal was announced in October 2017, effective on 30 June 2018. Prior to Adidas, the Italian sports company Lotto produced Milan's sportswear.

For the 2024–2025 season, AC Milan released a fourth kit in partnership with Off-White described as a "manifesto of style".

Kit supplier	Period	Contract announcement	Contract duration	Value	Notes
Adidas	1998–2018	9 October 2013	2013–2018	€20 million per year	Original contract duration: 2013–2023; Contract prematurely terminated by mutual consent at the end of the 2017–18 season.
Puma	2018–present	12 February 2018	2018–present	Between €10 million and 15 million per year	

=== Table of kit suppliers and shirt sponsors ===
Period	Kit manufacturer	Shirt sponsor			
Period	Kit manufacturer	Brand	Company	Back	Sleeve
1978–80	Adidas	None		None	
1980–82	Linea Milan	Pooh Jeans	Italiana Manifatture	None	
1982–83	Ennerre	Hitachi	Hitachi Europe	None	
1983–84	Ennerre	Olio Cuore		None	
1984–85	Rolly Go	Oscar Mondadori	Arnoldo Mondadori Editore	None	
1985–86	Gianni Rivera	Fotorex U-Bix	Olivetti	None	
1986–87	Kappa	Fotorex U-Bix	Olivetti	None	
1987–90	Kappa	Mediolanum		None	
1990–92	Adidas	Mediolanum		None	
1992–93	Adidas	Motta		None	
1993–94	Lotto	Motta		None	
1994–98	Lotto	Opel	General Motors	None	
1998–06	Adidas	Opel	General Motors	None	
2006–10	Adidas	Bwin		None	
2010–18	Adidas	Emirates	The Emirates Group	None	
2018–21	Puma	Emirates	The Emirates Group	None	
2021–23	Puma	Emirates	The Emirates Group	Wefox	BitMEX
2023–24	Puma	Emirates	The Emirates Group	Wefox	MSC Cruises
2024–	Puma	Emirates	The Emirates Group	Bitpanda	MSC Cruises

=== Other sponsors ===
Starting in 2013, Banco BPM has been a long-term premium partner of AC Milan with the deal progressively renewed, most recently in 2023.

Skrill is AC Milan's official global payments partner since 2020 in a deal originally for four years. Skrill has also been match sponsor.

eBay is AC Milan's official marketplace partner since 2020 with a deal that includes an online AC Milan store hosted on eBay's website.

== AC Milan financials ==
On 13 April 2017 Milan became a subsidiary of Rossoneri Sport Investment Luxembourg, which acquired 99.9% shares of AC Milan S.p.A. from Fininvest. Li Yonghong became the new chairman and Marco Fassone was confirmed as CEO. Li Yonghong's investment vehicle was removed as the shareholder of Rossoneri Sport Investment Luxembourg after defaulting to Elliott Management Corporation, which lent a large sum of money to Li to finalise the acquisition. Other partners of Elliott were Arena Investors and Blue Skye, according to news reports. Elliott nominated a new board of directors for both Rossoneri Sport Investment Luxembourg and Milan, with Paolo Scaroni as the new chairman (Italian: presidente) of the board of Milan. The four previous Chinese member of the board and former CEO Marco Fassone were all dismissed.

According to The Football Money League published by consultants Deloitte, in the 2005–06 season, Milan was the fifth-highest earning football club in the world with an estimated revenue of €233.7 million. However, it fell to twelfth in 2013–14 season. The club is also ranked as the eighth-wealthiest football club in the world by Forbes magazine as of 2014, making it the wealthiest in Italian football, just surpassing ninth-ranked Juventus by a narrow margin.

As a consequence of the aggregate 2.5-year financial result in the reporting periods ending at 31 December 2015, 31 December 2016 and 30 June 2017 (a FFP-adjusted net loss of €146 million, €121 million in excess of the acceptable deviation in the regulation), Milan was initially banned from European competitions due to breach in UEFA Financial Fair Play Regulations. However, the European ban was lifted by an appeal to the Court of Arbitration for Sport. Milan was allowed to achieve the break even condition on or before 30 June 2021.

AC Milan Group consolidated financial statement (In millions of euros)
Year	Revenue	Profit	Total Assets	Equity	Re-capitalization
2006	305.111	11.904	287.065	▼ −40.768	▼1.464
2007	▼275.442	▼ −31.716	▲303.678	▼ −47.483	▲25.000
2008	▼237.900	▼ −66.838	▲325.625	▼ −64.482	▲50.000
2009 (restated)	▲307.349	▲ −9.836	▲394.150	▼ −71.978	▼2.340
2010	▼253.196	▼ −69.751	▼380.868	▼ −96.693	▲45.068
2011	▲266.811	▲ −67.334	▼363.756	▲ −77.091	▲87.060
2012	▲329.307	▲ −6.857	▼334.284	▲ −54.948	▼29.000
2013	▼278.713	▼ −15.723	▲354.595	▼ −66.921	▼3.750
2014	▼233.574	▼ −91.285	▼291.301	▼ −94.206 (Note: The full restated financial statement of 2014 was not available; in 2016 Annual Report, the equity at the end of 2014 financial year was stated as negative 111.616 million)	▲64.000
2015 (restated)	▼213.426	▲ −89.079	▲362.156	▲ −50.557	▲150.000
2016	▲236.128	▲ −74.871	▼315.200	−50.427	▼75.000
2017 (first half)	▼102.866	▲ −32.624	▲447.557	▲29.969	▲59.520 + 53.500
2017–18	▲255.733	▼ −126.019	▼435.166	▼ −36.043	▼38.88 + 21.1032 (59.983)
2018–19	▼242.637	▼ −145.985	▲455.954	▲82.286	
2019–20	▼192.317	▼ −194.616	▼380.588	▼34.124	
2020–21	▲261.1	▲ −96.4	▲405.7	▲67.3	
2021–22	▲297.7	▲ −66.5			
2022–23	▲404.5	▲6.1		▲177.2	
2023–24	▲457				

Note: Re-capitalization figures were obtained from item versamenti soci in conto capitale e/o copertura perdite, for 2006 to 2017 financial year

== Superleague Formula ==
Milan took part in three editions of the Superleague Formula, from 2008 to 2010. This car competition involved the participation of professional racing teams sponsored by international football teams. The Rossoneri supported the Dutch team Scuderia Playteam in the first season, then Azerti Motorsport in 2009 and the Atech Grand Prix in 2010. The team took several victories and pole positions, and finished third in the final standings of the 2008 championship with Robert Doornbos, former Minardi and Red Bull driver in the Formula 1 World Championship, as main driver. In the same year, Doornbos achieved his team's first victory at the Nürburgring circuit in Germany. Giorgio Pantano drove for Milan in the 2009 season and he has also won races for the team.

== See also ==
- Milan Lab
- European Club Association
- Dynasties in Italian football
- List of world champion football clubs
