= 2026–27 AC Milan season =

AC Milan
2026–27 season
- Owner: RedBird Capital Partners (99.93%); Private shareholders (0.07%)
- Chairman: Paolo Scaroni
- Head coach: Ruben Amorim
- Stadium: San Siro
- Serie A: 4th
- Coppa Italia: Round of 16
- UEFA Europa League: League phase
- Top goalscorer: League: Alphadjo Cisse; Adrien Rabiot (5 each); All: Alphadjo Cisse (8)
- Highest home attendance: 77,691 vs Internazionale; 31 October 2026, Serie A
- Lowest home attendance: 49,372 vs Ferencváros; 5 November 2026, UEFA Europa League
- Average home league attendance: 74,545
- Biggest win: 5–1 vs Frosinone (H); 22 November 2026, Serie A Tim
- Biggest defeat: 0–3 vs Bournemouth (A); 22 October 2026, UEFA Europa League
Home colours	Away colours	Third colours

The 2026–27 season is the 128th season in the existence of AC Milan, and the club's 93rd season in the top flight of Italian football. In addition to the domestic league, Milan is also participating in the Coppa Italia and UEFA Europa League.

== Players ==
=== Squad information ===
As of 2 September 2026

No.	Player	Nat.	Position(s)	Date of birth (age)	Signed in	Contract ends	Signed from	Transfer fee	Notes
Goalkeepers
1	Pietro Terracciano	(Italy)	GK	8 March 1990 (age 36)	2025	2027	(Italy) Fiorentina	Free	
16	Mike Maignan (captain)	(France)	GK	3 July 1995 (age 31)	2021	2031	(France) Lille	€13,000,000	
96	Lorenzo Torriani	(Italy)	GK	31 January 2005 (age 21)	2024	2030	(Italy) Milan Primavera	—N/a	From Youth system
Defenders
2	Pervis Estupiñán	(Ecuador)	LB / LWB / LM	17 January 1998 (age 28)	2025	2030	(England) Brighton & Hove Albion	€17,000,000	
5	Koni De Winter	(Belgium)	CB / RB	12 June 2002 (age 24)	2025	2030	(Italy) Genoa	€20,000,000	
13	Sankhoun Diawara	(France)	CB / LB	13 January 2006 (age 20)	2026	2031	(France) Troyes	€3,000,000	
23	Fikayo Tomori	(England)	CB / RB	19 December 1997 (age 28)	2021	2027	(England) Chelsea	€28,500,000	
31	Strahinja Pavlović	(Serbia)	CB	24 May 2001 (age 25)	2024	2031	(Austria) Red Bull Salzburg	€18,000,000	
33	Davide Bartesaghi	(Italy)	LB / CB / LWB	29 December 2005 (age 20)	2023	2030	(Italy) Milan Primavera	—N/a	From Youth system
34	Mario Gila	(Spain)	CB / RB	29 August 2000 (age 26)	2026	2031	(Italy) Lazio	€25,000,000	
35	Valeri Vladimirov	(Bulgaria)	CB	4 June 2008 (age 18)	2024	2029	(Italy) Milan Primavera	—N/a	From Youth system
42	Filippo Terracciano	(Italy)	CB / RB / LB	8 February 2003 (age 23)	2024	2029	(Italy) Hellas Verona	€4,500,000	
46	Matteo Gabbia (vice-captain)	(Italy)	CB / DM	21 October 1999 (age 27)	2017	2029	(Italy) Milan Primavera	—N/a	From Youth system
Midfielders
8	Ruben Loftus-Cheek	(England)	AM / CM / DM	23 January 1996 (age 30)	2023	2027	(England) Chelsea	€16,000,000	
11	Christian Pulisic	(United States)	AM / RW / LW	18 September 1998 (age 28)	2023	2031	(England) Chelsea	€20,000,000	
12	Adrien Rabiot	(France)	CM / AM / DM	3 April 1995 (age 31)	2025	2028	(France) Marseille	€9,000,000	
14	Luka Modrić	(Croatia)	DM / CM / AM	9 September 1985 (age 41)	2025	2027	(Spain) Real Madrid	Free	
20	Omari Hutchinson	(England)	AM / RW / RWB	30 October 2003 (age 23)	2026	2027	(England) Nottingham Forest	€4,200,000	On loan, with option to buy
22	Diego Moreira	(Belgium)	LM / LWB / RM	6 August 2004 (age 22)	2026	2031	(France) Strasbourg	€45,000,000	
28	Christian Comotto	(Italy)	CM	25 April 2008 (age 18)	2024	2031	(Italy) Milan Primavera	—N/a	From Youth system
30	Ardon Jashari	(Switzerland)	DM / CM	30 July 2002 (age 24)	2025	2030	(Belgium) Club Brugge	€34,000,000	
56	Alexis Saelemaekers	(Belgium)	RM / RWB / AM	27 June 1999 (age 27)	2020	2031	(Belgium) Anderlecht	€7,200,000	
70	Alphadjo Cisse	(Italy)	AM / LW / SS	22 October 2006 (age 20)	2026	2030	(Italy) Hellas Verona	€8,000,000	
80	Yunus Musah	(United States)	CM / DM	29 November 2002 (age 23)	2023	2028	(Spain) Valencia	€20,000,000	
Forwards
9	Gonçalo Ramos	(Portugal)	ST	20 June 2001 (age 25)	2026	2031	(France) Paris Saint-Germain	€74,000,000	
21	Samuel Chukwueze	(Nigeria)	RW / RWB / RM	22 May 1999 (age 27)	2023	2028	(Spain) Villarreal	€20,000,000	
73	Francesco Camarda	(Italy)	ST	10 March 2008 (age 18)	2023	2031	(Italy) Milan Primavera	—N/a	From Youth system

== Transfers ==
=== Summer window ===
Deals officialised beforehand are effective starting from 1 July 2026, unless stated otherwise.

==== In ====
Date	Pos.	Player	Age	Moving from	Fee	Notes	Source
31 March 2026	FW	(Montenegro) Andrej Kostić	19	(Serbia) Partizan	€3,000,000	Joined Milan Futuro	
30 June 2026	FW	(Portugal) Gonçalo Ramos	25	(France) Paris Saint-Germain	€74,000,000		
10 July 2026	DF	(Spain) Mario Gila	25	(Italy) Lazio	€25,000,000	+ €5,000,000 add-ons	
29 July 2026	DF	(France) (Senegal) Sankhoun Diawara	20	(France) Troyes	€3,000,000		
19 August 2026	MF	(Belgium) Diego Moreira	22	(France) Strasbourg	€45,000,000	+ €20,000,000 add-ons	

==== Loans in ====
Date	Pos.	Player	Age	Moving to	Fee	Notes	Source
31 August 2026	FW	(England) (Jamaica) Omari Hutchinson	22	(England) Nottingham Forest	€4,200,000	With option to buy	

==== Loan returns ====
Date	Pos.	Player	Age	Moving from	Fee	Notes	Source
18 June 2026	FW	(Italy) Francesco Camarda	18	(Italy) Lecce	€1,000,000	Buy-back clause activated	
30 June 2026	DF	(Italy) Filippo Terracciano	23	(Italy) Cremonese	Free		
30 June 2026	MF	(Democratic Republic of the Congo) (France) Warren Bondo	22	(Italy) Cremonese	Free		
30 June 2026	MF	(Italy) (Guinea) Alphadjo Cisse	19	(Italy) Catanzaro	Free		
30 June 2026	MF	(Italy) Christian Comotto	18	(Italy) Spezia	Free		
30 June 2026	MF	(United States) Yunus Musah	23	(Italy) Atalanta	Free		
30 June 2026	FW	(Nigeria) Samuel Chukwueze	27	(England) Fulham	Free		

Total spending: €155.1M▼

==== Out ====
Date	Pos.	Player	Age	Moving to	Fee	Notes	Source
8 February 2026	DF	(Spain) Álex Jiménez	20	(England) Bournemouth	€18,500,000	From loan to definitive purchase	
18 February 2026	MF	(Italy) Tommaso Pobega	26	(Italy) Bologna	€7,000,000	From loan to definitive purchase	
4 May 2026	FW	(Italy) Lorenzo Colombo	24	(Italy) Genoa	€7,000,000	From loan to definitive purchase	
18 June 2026	MF	(Ivory Coast) Chaka Traorè	21	(Serbia) Partizan	€100,000	From Milan Futuro	
26 June 2026	FW	(Italy) Simone Lontani	18	(Italy) Parma	Free	End of contract, from Primavera squad	
29 June 2026	GK	(Italy) Alessandro Longoni	18	(France) Paris Saint-Germain	Free	End of contract, from Primavera squad	
30 June 2026	MF	(Italy) Simone Branca	34	(Italy) Cjarlins Muzane	Free	End of contract, from Milan Futuro	
30 June 2026	FW	(Italy) Filippo Scotti	19	(Italy) Avellino	Free	End of contract, from Primavera squad	
1 July 2026	FW	(Spain) Álvaro Morata	33	(Italy) Como	€12,000,000	From loan to definitive purchase	
18 July 2026	MF	(Sweden) Maximilian Ibrahimović	19	(Netherlands) AZ	Undisclosed	After return from loan	
7 August 2026	MF	(Algeria) Ismaël Bennacer	28	(Qatar) Al-Gharafa	Free	Contract termination, after return from loan	
12 August 2026	DF	(Italy) Gabriele Minotti	23	(Italy) Renate	Free	Contract termination, from Milan Futuro	
14 August 2026	MF	(Nigeria) Victor Eletu	21	(Italy) Pescara	Undisclosed	From Milan Futuro	
28 August 2026	FW	(Italy) Diego Sia	20	(Italy) Dolomiti Bellunesi	Undisclosed	After return from loan	
29 August 2026	FW	(Portugal) Rafael Leão	27	(Turkey) Galatasaray	€38,000,000		
31 August 2026	FW	(Italy) Andrea Magrassi	33	(Italy) Reggina	Free	Contract termination, from Milan Futuro	
7 September 2026	MF	(Sweden) (Bosnia and Herzegovina) Demirel Hodžić	21	(Croatia) Istra	Undisclosed	After return from loan	

==== Loans ended ====
Date	Pos.	Player	Age	Moving to	Fee	Notes	Source
30 June 2026	DF	(Austria) Magnus Dalpiaz	19	(Germany) Bayern Munich	Free	From Milan Futuro	
30 June 2026	FW	(Germany) Niclas Füllkrug	33	(England) West Ham United	Free		

==== Loans out ====
Date	Pos.	Player	Age	Moving to	Fee	Notes	Source
14 August 2026	DF	(Switzerland) Zachary Athekame	21	(France) Lyon	Undisclosed		
18 August 2026	DF	(Germany) (Nigeria) David Odogu	20	(France) Toulouse	Undisclosed		
19 August 2026	FW	(Montenegro) Andrej Kostić	19	(Netherlands) Sparta Rotterdam	Undisclosed	From Milan Futuro	
25 August 2026	FW	(France) Christopher Nkunku	28	(Germany) RB Leipzig	€3,000,000	With option to buy	
29 August 2026	MF	(Italy) Samuele Ricci	25	(Italy) Como	€1,500,000	With option to buy	
31 August 2026	FW	(Mexico) Santiago Giménez	25	(Portugal) Porto	Undisclosed	With obligation to buy	
1 September 2026	MF	(Italy) Kevin Zeroli	21	(Italy) Südtirol	Undisclosed	After return from loan, with option to buy	
1 September 2026	MF	(Italy) Jacopo Sardo	21	(Italy) Pescara	Undisclosed	From Milan Futuro	
1 September 2026	MF	(France) Youssouf Fofana	27	(Spain) Sevilla	Undisclosed		

Total income: ▲€87.1M
Balance: ▼€68.0M

=== Winter window ===
Deals officialised beforehand will be effective starting from 2 January 2027.

==== In ====
Date	Pos.	Player	Age	Moving from	Fee	Notes	Source

==== Loan returns ====
Date	Pos.	Player	Age	Moving from	Fee	Notes	Source

Total spending: ▼

==== Out ====
Date	Pos.	Player	Age	Moving to	Fee	Notes	Source

==== Loans out ====
Date	Pos.	Player	Age	Moving to	Fee	Notes	Source

Total income: ▲
Balance: ▼

== Pre-season and friendlies ==
Win Draw Loss Fixtures

19 July 2026 Friendly	Milan	7–0	Milan Futuro	Carnago
10:30 CEST (UTC+2)	Kostić; Ossola; Chukwueze; Pavlović; Camarda; Loftus-Cheek; Fofana	Report		Stadium: Milanello

25 July 2026 Friendly	Celtic (Scotland)	2–2	Milan	Glasgow, Scotland
15:00 BST (UTC+1)	Durán 11'; Forrest 28'; Tierney (yellow card) 50'	Report	Camarda 47' (pen.), 52'	Stadium: Celtic Park; Referee: Nick Walsh (Scotland)

5 August 2026 Friendly	Milan	1–1	Internazionale	Perth, Australia
18:00 AWST (UTC+8)	Nkunku 84' (pen.); Estupiñán (yellow card) 90+3'	Report	Bisseck (yellow card) 36'; Dimarco 52'	Stadium: Optus Stadium; Attendance: 52,310; Referee: Lachlan Keevers (Australia)

8 August 2026 Friendly	Chelsea (England)	3–0	Milan	Jakarta, Indonesia
19:00 WIB (UTC+7)	João Pedro 45+2', 46'; Caicedo 50'	Report	Pavlović (yellow card) 45'	Stadium: Gelora Bung Karno Stadium; Attendance: 40,856; Referee: Yudai Yamamoto (Japan)

15 August 2026 Friendly	Manchester United (England)	2–4	Milan	Wroclaw, Poland
16:45 CEST (UTC+1)	Maguire 2'; Dorgu (yellow card) 48', (goal) 51'	Report	Estupiñán (yellow card) 11'; Chukwueze 37'; Cisse 57'; Ramos 68'; Loftus-Cheek 71'	Stadium: Tarczyński Arena; Referee: Szymon Marciniak (Poland)

== Competitions ==
=== Overall record ===
Competition	First match	Last match	Starting round	Final position	Record							
Competition	First match	Last match	Starting round	Final position	Pld	W	D	L	GF	GA	GD	Win %
Serie A	23 August 2026	30 May 2027	Matchday 1	TBD	11	7	3	1	23	13	+10	63.64
Coppa Italia	13 January 2027	TBD	Round of 16	TBD	0	0	0	0	0	0	+0	—
UEFA Europa League	16 September 2026	TBD	League phase	TBD	4	1	0	3	4	7	−3	25.00
Total					15	8	3	4	27	20	+7	53.33

Last updated: 8 November 2026
Source: Soccerway

=== Serie A ===
==== League table ====
Pos	Team	Pld	W	D	L	GF	GA	GD	Pts	Qualification or relegation
2	Roma	12	9	3	0	36	11	+25	30	Qualification for the Champions League league phase
3	Inter Milan	11	9	1	1	28	13	+15	28	Qualification for the Champions League league phase
4	AC Milan	12	8	3	1	28	14	+14	27	Qualification for the Champions League league phase
5	Como	12	8	2	2	20	10	+10	26	Qualification for the Europa League league phase (Note: The winners of the 2026–27 Coppa Italia and the fifth-placed team both qualify for the Europa League league phase. If the Coppa Italia winners finish in the top five, the sixth-placed team will qualify for the Europa League league phase. If Italy are one of the two associations with the highest UEFA coefficient points, fifth place will qualify for the Champions League league phase and the other qualifying spots will move down one position.)
6	Juventus	12	6	3	3	19	12	+7	21	Qualification for the Conference League play-off round

Updated to match(es) played on 22 November 2026. Source: Serie A
Rules for classification: 1) Points; 2) Head-to-head points; 3) Head-to-head goal difference; 4) Goal difference; 5) Goals scored; 6) Drawing of lots.
End-of-season ties on points for 1st or 17th are instead decided by a one- or two-leg play-off, respectively, unless the play-off would involve a UEFA competition finalist (in which case rules 2–6 apply). Rules 2–6 determine home advantage (for 17th, the better-ranked team hosts the second leg); if three or more teams are tied, they also select the two play-off teams.

==== Results summary ====
Overall								Home						Away					
Pld	W	D	L	GF	GA	GD	Pts	W	D	L	GF	GA	GD	W	D	L	GF	GA	GD
12	8	3	1	28	14	+14	27	5	0	1	18	8	+10	3	3	0	10	6	+4

Last updated: 22 November 2026.
Source: Serie A

==== Results by round ====
Round	1	2	3	4	5	6	7	8	9	10	11	12	13	14	15	16	17	18	19	20	21	22	23	24	25	26	27	28	29	30	31	32	33	34	35	36	37	38
Ground	A	H	A	A	H	A	H	A	H	H	A	H	A	H	A	H	A	H	A	H	A	H	A	A	H	A	H	H	A	H	A	H	A	H	A	H	A	H
Result	W	W	D	D	W	D	W	W	L	W	W	W																										
Position	5	3	4	6	5	5	4	4	5	5	4	4																										

Updated to match(es) played on 22 November 2026. Source: Serie A
A = Away; H = Home; W = Win; D = Draw; L = Loss; P = Postponed

==== Matches ====
The league dates were released on 5 June 2026.

23 August 2026 1	Torino	1–2	Milan	Turin
20:45 CEST (UTC+2)	Adams 90+3'	Report	Loftus-Cheek (yellow card) 53'; Cisse 64'; Rabiot 67'	Stadium: Stadio Olimpico Grande Torino; Attendance: 24,285; Referee: Luca Zufferli

28 August 2026 2	Milan	2–0	Venezia	Milan
20:45 CEST (UTC+2)	Ramos 69'; Pavlović (yellow card) 71'; Halhal 89' (o.g.)	Report	Schingtienne (yellow card) 27'; Pérez (yellow card) 48'; Haps (yellow card) 54'	Stadium: San Siro; Attendance: 75,141; Referee: Gianluca Manganiello

6 September 2026 3	Juventus	1–1	Milan	Turin
20:45 CEST (UTC+2)	Gatti 90+2', (yellow card) 90+6'	Report	Cisse 68', (yellow card) 90+6'; Estupiñán (yellow card) 79'; De Winter (yellow card) 90+2'	Stadium: Juventus Stadium; Attendance: 41,577; Referee: Maurizio Mariani

12 September 2026 4	Lazio	2–2	Milan	Rome
18:00 CEST (UTC+2)	Cancellieri 10'; Noslin 39'; Belahyane (yellow card) 63'; Zaccagni (yellow card) 78'	Report	Pulisic (yellow card) 59'; Pavlović (yellow card) 64'; Moreira 65', 67'; Gila (yellow card) 86'	Stadium: Stadio Olimpico; Attendance: 10,500; Referee: Matteo Marcenaro

20 September 2026 5	Milan	3–0	Lecce	Milan
20:45 CEST (UTC+2)	Pulisic 14'; Rabiot 61'; Moreira 73'	Report	Veiga (yellow card) 58'	Stadium: San Siro; Attendance: 73,197; Referee: Federico La Penna

11 October 2026 6	Sassuolo	1–1	Milan	Reggio Emilia
18:00 CEST (UTC+2)	Odenthal 68'; Thorstvedt (yellow card) 90+4'	Report	Estupiñán (yellow card) 41'; De Winter (yellow card) 45+3'; Rabiot 63'; Ramos (yellow card) 87'; Pavlović (yellow card) 90+1'	Stadium: Mapei Stadium – Città del Tricolore; Attendance: 20,347; Referee: Francesco Fourneau

18 October 2026 7	Milan	3–2	Atalanta	Milan
18:00 CEST (UTC+2)	Ramos 24' (pen.), (penalty missed) 57'; Rabiot (yellow card) 41', (goal) 43'; Gila 57'	Report	Gaetano 66'; Éderson (yellow card) 69'; Obrić (yellow card) 78'; Krstović 81'	Stadium: San Siro; Attendance: 73,869; Referee: Daniele Chiffi

25 October 2026 8	Udinese	0–2	Milan	Udine
20:45 CET (UTC+1)	Karlström (yellow card) 43'	Report	Pulisic 6'; Ramos (yellow card) 39'; Hutchinson 65'; Modrić (yellow card) 90'	Stadium: Stadio Friuli; Attendance: 23,550; Referee: Matteo Marcenaro

28 October 2026 9	Milan	2–4	Bologna	Milan
18:30 CET (UTC+1)	Cisse 14', 27'	Report	Mbangula 8', 62', 86'; Bartesaghi 60' (o.g.); Pobega (yellow card) 76'; Heggem (yellow card) 84'	Stadium: San Siro; Attendance: 72,825; Referee: Juan Luca Sacchi

31 October 2026 10	Milan	3–1	Internazionale	Milan
20:45 CET (UTC+1)	Pulisic 4'; Rabiot 10'; Moreira 43', (yellow card) 52'; De Winter (yellow card) 49'	Report	Bastoni 22'; Carlos Augusto (yellow card) 90'	Stadium: San Siro; Attendance: 77,691; Referee: Marco Guida

8 November 2026 11	Genoa	1–2	Milan	Genoa
15:00 CET (UTC+1)	Marcandalli (yellow card) 50'; Ellertsson 88'; Ehizibue (yellow card) 90+4'	Report	Cisse 13'; Pulisic 19', (yellow card) 77'; Diawara (yellow card) 29'; Rabiot (yellow card) 50'; Gila (yellow card) 87'	Stadium: Stadio Luigi Ferraris; Attendance: 30,987; Referee: Davide Massa

22 November 2026 12	Milan	5–1	Frosinone	Milan
15:00 CET (UTC+1)	Calvani 4' (o.g.); Ramos 19'; Jashari 48'; Cisse 60', (yellow card) 87'; Pulisic 68'	Report	Masini 25'; Cittadini (yellow card) 34'; Calò (yellow card) 40'; Monterisi (yellow card) 57'; Oyono (yellow card) 66'	Stadium: San Siro; Referee: Luca Pairetto

30 November 2026 13	Cagliari	v	Milan	Cagliari
20:45 CET (UTC+1)		Report		Stadium: Unipol Domus

6 December 2026 14	Milan	v	Parma	Milan
20:45 CET (UTC+1)		Report		Stadium: San Siro

13 December 2026 15	Napoli	v	Milan	Naples
20:45 CET (UTC+1)		Report		Stadium: Stadio Diego Armando Maradona

19 December 2026 16	Milan	v	Como	Milan
18:00 CET (UTC+1)		Report		Stadium: San Siro

2 January 2027 17	Monza	v	Milan	Monza
20:45 CET (UTC+1)		Report		Stadium: Stadio Brianteo

5 January 2027 18	Milan	v	Fiorentina	Milan
20:45 CET (UTC+1)		Report		Stadium: San Siro

9 January 2027 19	Roma	v	Milan	Rome
18:00 CET (UTC+1)		Report		Stadium: Stadio Olimpico

17 January 2027 20	Milan	v	Torino	Milan
--:-- CET (UTC+1)		Report		Stadium: San Siro

24 January 2027 21	Frosinone	v	Milan	Frosinone
--:-- CET (UTC+1)		Report		Stadium: Stadio Benito Stirpe

31 January 2027 22	Milan	v	Juventus	Milan
--:-- CET (UTC+1)		Report		Stadium: San Siro

7 February 2027 23	Bologna	v	Milan	Bologna
--:-- CET (UTC+1)		Report		Stadium: Stadio Renato Dall'Ara

14 February 2027 24	Internazionale	v	Milan	Milan
--:-- CET (UTC+1)		Report		Stadium: Stadio Giuseppe Meazza

21 February 2027 25	Milan	v	Genoa	Milan
--:-- CET (UTC+1)		Report		Stadium: San Siro

28 February 2027 26	Como	v	Milan	Como
--:-- CET (UTC+1)		Report		Stadium: Stadio Giuseppe Sinigaglia

7 March 2027 27	Milan	v	Cagliari	Milan
--:-- CET (UTC+1)		Report		Stadium: San Siro

14 March 2027 28	Milan	v	Sassuolo	Milan
--:-- CET (UTC+1)		Report		Stadium: San Siro

21 March 2027 29	Atalanta	v	Milan	Bergamo
--:-- CET (UTC+1)		Report		Stadium: Gewiss Stadium

4 April 2027 30	Milan	v	Monza	Milan
--:-- CEST (UTC+2)		Report		Stadium: San Siro

11 April 2027 31	Fiorentina	v	Milan	Florence
--:-- CEST (UTC+2)		Report		Stadium: Stadio Artemio Franchi

18 April 2027 32	Milan	v	Napoli	Milan
--:-- CEST (UTC+2)		Report		Stadium: San Siro

25 April 2027 33	Lecce	v	Milan	Lecce
--:-- CEST (UTC+2)		Report		Stadium: Stadio Via del mare

2 May 2027 34	Milan	v	Lazio	Milan
--:-- CEST (UTC+2)		Report		Stadium: San Siro

9 May 2027 35	Parma	v	Milan	Parma
--:-- CEST (UTC+2)		Report		Stadium: Stadio Ennio Tardini

16 May 2027 36	Milan	v	Roma	Milan
--:-- CEST (UTC+2)		Report		Stadium: San Siro

23 May 2027 37	Venezia	v	Milan	Venice
--:-- CEST (UTC+2)		Report		Stadium: Stadio Pier Luigi Penzo

30 May 2027 38	Milan	v	Udinese	Milan
--:-- CEST (UTC+2)		Report		Stadium: San Siro

=== Coppa Italia ===
13 January 2027 Round of 16	Milan	v	Monza	Milan
21:00 CET (UTC+1)		Report		Stadium: San Siro

=== UEFA Europa League ===
==== League phase ====
The league phase draw was held on 28 August 2026.

Pos	Team	Pld	W	D	L	GF	GA	GD	Pts
26	(Austria) Red Bull Salzburg	4	1	1	2	3	8	−5	4
27	(Spain) Celta Vigo	4	1	0	3	4	6	−2	3
28	(Italy) Milan	4	1	0	3	4	7	−3	3
29	(Poland) Jagiellonia Białystok	4	1	0	3	4	7	−3	3
30	(Czech Republic) Viktoria Plzeň	4	1	0	3	3	7	−4	3

Updated to match(es) played on 5 November 2026. Source: UEFA
Rules for classification: League phase tiebreakers

Round	1	2	3	4	5	6	7	8
Ground	H	A	A	H	A	H	A	H
Result	L	W	L	L				
Position	29	16	24	28				
Points	0	3	3	3				

Updated to match(es) played on 5 November 2026. Source: UEFA
A = Away; H = Home; W = Win; D = Draw; L = Loss

16 September 2026 1	Milan (Italy)	0–2	(Portugal) Benfica	Milan, Italy
21:00 CEST (UTC+2)	Pavlović (yellow card) 11'	Report	Lukébakio 16'; El Karouani (yellow card) 26'; Durán (yellow card) 37'; Kamiński 53'; Banjaqui (yellow card) 77'; Barreiro (yellow card) 85'; Pavlidis (yellow card) 90+2'	Stadium: San Siro; Attendance: 68,393; Referee: Jarred Gillett (England)

15 October 2026 2	Red Bull Salzburg (Austria)	0–4	(Italy) Milan	Salzburg, Austria
18:45 CEST (UTC+2)	Zabransky (yellow card) 40'	Report	Cisse 15', 32', 49'; Hutchinson (yellow card) 21'; Ramos 72'; Terracciano (red card) 84'	Stadium: Red Bull Arena; Attendance: 22,503; Referee: Horațiu Feşnic (Romania)

22 October 2026 3	Bournemouth (England)	3–0	(Italy) Milan	Bournemouth, England
20:00 BST (UTC+1)	Kluivert 8' (pen.); Diakité (yellow card) 16'; Adams (yellow card) 29'; Tavernier 32' (pen.); Adli 84'	Report	Maignan (red card) 28'; Estupiñán (yellow card) 35'; Tomori (yellow card) 63'; De Winter (yellow card) 81'	Stadium: Dean Court; Attendance: 12,130; Referee: Vasilios Fotias (Greece)

5 November 2026 4	Milan (Italy)	0–2	(Hungary) Ferencváros	Milan, Italy
18:45 CET (UTC+1)	Cisse (yellow card) 32'; De Winter (yellow card) 51'	Report	Joseph 52', 66'; Yusuf (red card) 77'; Á. Nagy (yellow card) 90+4'	Stadium: San Siro; Attendance: 49,372; Referee: Urs Schnyder (Switzerland)

26 November 2026 5	Olympiacos (Greece)	v	(Italy) Milan	Piraeus, Greece
19:45 EET (UTC+2)		Report		Stadium: Karaiskakis Stadium

10 December 2026 6	Milan (Italy)	v	(England) Sunderland	Milan, Italy
21:00 CET (UTC+1)		Report		Stadium: San Siro

21 January 2027 7	Levski Sofia (Bulgaria)	v	(Italy) Milan	Sofia, Bulgaria
22:00 EET (UTC+2)		Report		Stadium: Vasil Levski National Stadium
Note: The match will be played at Vasil Levski National Stadium in Sofia, instead of Levski Sofia's regular stadium, Stadion Georgi Asparuhov, which does not meet UEFA requirements.

28 January 2027 8	Milan (Italy)	v	Ararat-Armenia	Milan, Italy
21:00 CET (UTC+1)		Report		Stadium: San Siro

== Statistics ==
=== Appearances and goals ===
As of 31 October 2026

No.	Pos	Nat	Player	Total		Serie A		Coppa Italia		Europa League	
No.	Pos	Nat	Player	Apps	Goals	Apps	Goals	Apps	Goals	Apps	Goals
Goalkeepers
1	GK	(Italy) ITA	Pietro Terracciano	0	0	0	0	0	0	0	0
16	GK	(France) FRA	Mike Maignan	13	0	10	0	0	0	3	0
96	GK	(Italy) ITA	Lorenzo Torriani	1	0	0	0	0	0	0+1	0
Defenders
2	DF	(Ecuador) ECU	Pervis Estupiñán	9	0	6+2	0	0	0	1	0
5	DF	(Belgium) BEL	Koni De Winter	13	0	9+1	0	0	0	3	0
13	DF	(France) FRA	Sankhoun Diawara	5	0	2+1	0	0	0	0+2	0
23	DF	(England) ENG	Fikayo Tomori	5	0	2+1	0	0	0	2	0
31	DF	(Serbia) SRB	Strahinja Pavlović	13	0	10	0	0	0	3	0
33	DF	(Italy) ITA	Davide Bartesaghi	9	0	3+3	0	0	0	2+1	0
34	DF	(Spain) ESP	Mario Gila	9	1	8	1	0	0	0+1	0
35	DF	(Bulgaria) BUL	Valeri Vladimirov	0	0	0	0	0	0	0	0
42	DF	(Italy) ITA	Filippo Terracciano	4	0	0+2	0	0	0	1+1	0
46	DF	(Italy) ITA	Matteo Gabbia	3	0	1+2	0	0	0	0	0
Midfielders
8	MF	(England) ENG	Ruben Loftus-Cheek	9	0	3+4	0	0	0	2	0
11	MF	(United States) USA	Christian Pulisic	9	3	5+2	3	0	0	0+2	0
12	MF	(France) FRA	Adrien Rabiot	11	5	6+2	5	0	0	1+2	0
14	MF	(Croatia) CRO	Luka Modrić	11	0	7+3	0	0	0	0+1	0
20	MF	(England) ENG	Omari Hutchinson	9	1	2+4	1	0	0	3	0
22	MF	(Belgium) BEL	Diego Moreira	8	4	4+2	4	0	0	1+1	0
28	MF	(Italy) ITA	Christian Comotto	3	0	0+2	0	0	0	0+1	0
30	MF	(Switzerland) SUI	Ardon Jashari	11	0	3+5	0	0	0	3	0
56	MF	(Belgium) BEL	Alexis Saelemaekers	5	0	2+2	0	0	0	0+1	0
70	MF	(Italy) ITA	Alphadjo Cisse	11	7	4+4	4	0	0	3	3
80	MF	(United States) USA	Yunus Musah	12	0	7+3	0	0	0	2	0
Forwards
9	FW	(Portugal) POR	Gonçalo Ramos	12	3	10	2	0	0	1+1	1
21	FW	(Nigeria) NGR	Samuel Chukwueze	8	0	6+1	0	0	0	1	0
73	FW	(Italy) ITA	Francesco Camarda	5	0	0+4	0	0	0	1	0
Players transferred out during the season

=== Goalscorers ===
As of 8 November 2026

Players in italics left the team during the season.

Rank	No.	Pos.	Nat.	Player	Serie A	Coppa Italia	Europa League	Total
1	70	MF	(Italy)	Alphadjo Cisse	5	0	3	8
2	12	MF	(France)	Adrien Rabiot	5	0	0	5
3	22	MF	(Belgium)	Diego Moreira	4	0	0	4
3	11	MF	(United States)	Christian Pulisic	4	0	0	4
5	9	FW	(Portugal)	Gonçalo Ramos	2	0	1	3
6	20	MF	(England)	Omari Hutchinson	1	0	0	1
6	34	DF	(Spain)	Mario Gila	1	0	0	1
Own goals					1	0	0	1
Totals					23	0	4	27

=== Assists ===
As of 8 November 2026

Players in italics left the team during the season.

Rank	No.	Pos.	Nat.	Player	Serie A	Coppa Italia	Europa League	Total
1	12	MF	(France)	Adrien Rabiot	4	0	1	5
2	22	DF	(Portugal)	Diego Moreira	3	0	0	3
3	14	MF	(Croatia)	Luka Modrić	2	0	0	2
3	21	FW	(Nigeria)	Samuel Chukwueze	2	0	0	2
5	9	FW	(Portugal)	Gonçalo Ramos	2	0	0	2
5	11	MF	(United States)	Christian Pulisic	1	0	0	1
5	20	MF	(England)	Omari Hutchinson	0	0	1	1
5	23	DF	(England)	Fikayo Tomori	1	0	0	1
5	31	DF	(Serbia)	Strahinja Pavlović	1	0	0	1
5	33	DF	(Italy)	Davide Bartesaghi	0	0	1	1
5	56	MF	(Belgium)	Alexis Saelemaekers	1	0	0	1
Totals					17	0	3	20

=== Clean sheets ===
As of 31 October 2026

Rank	No.	Pos.	Nat.	Player	Serie A	Coppa Italia	Europa League	Total
1	16	GK	(France)	Mike Maignan	3	0	1	4
Totals					3	0	1	4

=== Disciplinary record ===
As of 28 October 2026

Players in italics left the team during the season.

No.	Pos.	Nat.	Player	Serie A			Coppa Italia			Europa League			Total		
No.	Pos.	Nat.	Player	Yellow card	(yellow card) (yellow-red card)	Red card	Yellow card	(yellow card) (yellow-red card)	Red card	Yellow card	(yellow card) (yellow-red card)	Red card	Yellow card	(yellow card) (yellow-red card)	Red card
2	DF	(Ecuador)	Pervis Estupiñán	2						1			3		
5	DF	(Belgium)	Koni De Winter	2						1			3		
8	MF	(England)	Ruben Loftus-Cheek	1									1		
9	FW	(Portugal)	Gonçalo Ramos	2									2		
11	MF	(United States)	Christian Pulisic	1									1		
12	MF	(France)	Adrien Rabiot	1									1		
14	MF	(Croatia)	Luka Modrić	1									1		
16	GK	(France)	Mike Maignan									1			1
20	MF	(England)	Omari Hutchinson	1									1		
23	DF	(England)	Fikayo Tomori							1			1		
31	DF	(Serbia)	Strahinja Pavlović	3						1			4		
34	DF	(Spain)	Mario Gila	1									1		
42	DF	(Italy)	Filippo Terracciano									1			1
70	MF	(Italy)	Alphadjo Cisse	1									1		
Totals				16	0	0	0	0	0	4	0	2	20	0	2

== Notes ==
1. Difference between €3M paid by Lecce to buy out the player and €4M paid by Milan to counter buy-back
