= 2024–25 AC Milan season =

Milan
2024–25 season
- Owner: RedBird Capital Partners (99.93%); Private shareholders (0.07%)
- Chairman: Paolo Scaroni
- Head coach: Paulo Fonseca (until 29 December); Sérgio Conceição (from 30 December)
- Stadium: San Siro
- Serie A: 8th
- Coppa Italia: Runners-up
- Supercoppa Italiana: Winners
- UEFA Champions League: Knockout phase play-offs
- Top goalscorer: League: Christian Pulisic (11); All: Christian Pulisic (17)
- Highest home attendance: 75,502 vs Juventus; 23 November 2024, Serie A
- Lowest home attendance: 31,392 vs Sassuolo; 3 December 2024, Coppa Italia
- Average home league attendance: 71,528
- Biggest win: 6–1 vs Sassuolo (H); 3 December 2024, Coppa Italia
- Biggest defeat: 1–3 vs Liverpool (H); 17 September 2024, UEFA Champions League; 0–2 vs Napoli (H); 29 October 2024, Serie A 0–2 vs Juventus (A); 18 January 2025, Serie A
Home colours	Away colours	Third colours

The 2024–25 season was the 126th season in the existence of AC Milan, and the club's 91st season in the top flight of Italian football. In addition to the domestic league, Milan also participated in the Coppa Italia, Supercoppa Italiana and UEFA Champions League.

== Players ==
=== Squad information ===
As of 24 May 2025

No.	Player	Nat.	Position(s)	Date of birth (age)	Signed in	Contract ends	Signed from	Transfer fee	Notes	Apps	Goals
Goalkeepers
16	Mike Maignan (captain)	(France)	GK	3 July 1995 (age 31)	2021	2026	(France) Lille	€13,000,000		162	0
57	Marco Sportiello	(Italy)	GK	10 May 1992 (age 34)	2023	2027	(Italy) Atalanta	Free		12	0
96	Lorenzo Torriani	(Italy)	GK	31 January 2005 (age 21)	2024	2027	(Italy) Milan Primavera	Free	From Youth system	2	0
Defenders
19	Théo Hernandez (vice-captain)	(France)	LB / LM	6 October 1997 (age 29)	2019	2026	(Spain) Real Madrid	€20,000,000		261	34
20	Álex Jiménez	(Spain)	RB / LB / RW	8 May 2005 (age 21)	2023	2028	(Spain) Real Madrid B	€5,000,000	From Youth system	33	0
22	Emerson Royal	(Brazil)	RB / RM	14 January 1999 (age 27)	2024	2028	(England) Tottenham Hotspur	€15,000,000		25	0
23	Fikayo Tomori	(England)	CB / RB	19 December 1997 (age 28)	2021	2027	(England) Chelsea	€28,500,000		177	7
24	Alessandro Florenzi	(Italy)	RB / LB / RW	11 March 1991 (age 35)	2021	2025	(Italy) Roma	€3,700,000		77	3
28	Malick Thiaw	(Germany)	CB	8 August 2001 (age 25)	2022	2027	(Germany) Schalke 04	€7,000,000		85	1
31	Strahinja Pavlović	(Serbia)	CB	24 May 2001 (age 25)	2024	2028	(Austria) Red Bull Salzburg	€18,000,000		34	2
32	Kyle Walker	(England)	RB / CB	28 May 1990 (age 36)	2025	2025	(England) Manchester City	Loan		16	0
42	Filippo Terracciano	(Italy)	LB / RB	8 February 2003 (age 23)	2024	2029	(Italy) Hellas Verona	€4,500,000		22	0
46	Matteo Gabbia	(Italy)	CB	21 October 1999 (age 27)	2017	2029	(Italy) Milan Primavera	Free	From Youth system	112	6
Midfielders
8	Ruben Loftus-Cheek	(England)	CM / AM	23 January 1996 (age 30)	2023	2027	(England) Chelsea	€16,000,000		67	10
11	Christian Pulisic	(United States)	RW / LW / AM	18 September 1998 (age 28)	2023	2027	(England) Chelsea	€20,000,000		99	31
14	Tijjani Reijnders	(Netherlands)	CM / AM	29 July 1998 (age 28)	2023	2027	(Netherlands) AZ	€20,000,000		103	19
29	Youssouf Fofana	(France)	DM / CM	1 October 1999 (age 27)	2024	2028	(France) Monaco	€20,000,000		51	1
38	Warren Bondo	(France)	CM / DM	15 September 2003 (age 23)	2025	2029	(Italy) Monza	€10,000,000		5	0
80	Yunus Musah	(United States)	CM / AM / RM	29 November 2002 (age 23)	2023	2028	(Spain) Valencia	€20,000,000		79	0
Forward
7	Santiago Giménez	(Mexico)	ST	18 April 2001 (age 25)	2025	2029	(Netherlands) Feyenoord	€32,000,000		19	6
9	Luka Jović	(Serbia)	ST	23 December 1997 (age 28)	2023	2025	(Italy) Fiorentina	Free		47	13
10	Rafael Leão	(Portugal)	LW / ST	10 June 1999 (age 27)	2019	2028	(France) Lille	€28,000,000		260	70
21	Samuel Chukwueze	(Nigeria)	RW	22 May 1999 (age 27)	2023	2028	(Spain) Villarreal	€20,000,000		68	8
79	João Félix	(Portugal)	ST / AM / LW	10 November 1999 (age 27)	2025	2025	(England) Chelsea	Loan		21	3
90	Tammy Abraham	(England)	ST	2 October 1997 (aged 26)	2024	2025	(Italy) Roma	Loan		44	10
99	Riccardo Sottil	(Italy)	LW / RW	3 June 1999 (age 27)	2025	2025	(Italy) Fiorentina	Loan		8	0

== Transfers ==
=== Summer window ===
Deals officialised beforehand are effective starting from 1 July 2024.

==== In ====
Date	Pos.	Player	Age	Moving from	Fee	Notes	Source
28 June 2024	DF	(Spain) Álex Jiménez	19	(Spain) Real Madrid Castilla	€5,000,000	From loan to definitive purchase	
12 July 2024	FW	(Italy) Samuele Longo	32	(Spain) Ponferradina	Free	Joined Milan Futuro	
12 July 2024	DF	(Romania) (Italy) Matteo Duțu	18	(Italy) Lazio	Undisclosed	Joined Primavera squad	
19 July 2024	FW	(Spain) Álvaro Morata	31	(Spain) Atlético Madrid	€13,000,000	—N/a	
31 July 2024	DF	(Serbia) Strahinja Pavlović	23	(Austria) Red Bull Salzburg	€18,000,000	—N/a	
12 August 2024	DF	(Brazil) Emerson Royal	25	(England) Tottenham Hotspur	€15,000,000	—N/a	
14 August 2024	DF	(Bulgaria) Valeri Vladimirov	16	(Bulgaria) Botev Plovdiv	Undisclosed	Joined Primavera squad	
17 August 2024	MF	(France) Youssouf Fofana	25	(France) Monaco	€20,000,000	—N/a	
23 August 2024	MF	(Sweden) (Bosnia and Herzegovina) Demirel Hodžić	19	(Italy) Bologna	Undisclosed	Joined Milan Futuro	
30 August 2024	MF	(Netherlands) (Suriname) Silvano Vos	19	(Netherlands) Ajax	€3,000,000	Joined Milan Futuro	
30 August 2024	DF	(Slovenia) (Bosnia and Herzegovina) Damir Zukić	20	(Slovenia) Primorje	Undisclosed	Joined Milan Futuro	

==== Loans in ====
Date	Pos.	Player	Age	Moving from	Fee	Notes	Source
1 August 2024	GK	(Italy) Davide Mastrantonio	20	(Italy) Roma	Free	Joined Milan Futuro	
29 August 2024	FW	(Italy) Nicolò Turco	20	(Austria) Red Bull Salzburg	Free	Joined Milan Futuro	
30 August 2024	FW	(England) Tammy Abraham	26	(Italy) Roma	Undisclosed	—N/a	

==== Loan returns ====
Date	Pos.	Player	Age	Moving from	Fee	Notes	Source
30 June 2024	DF	(Senegal) Fodé Ballo-Touré	27	(England) Fulham	—N/a	Joined Milan Futuro	
30 June 2024	DF	(Italy) Andrea Bozzolan	20	(Italy) Perugia	—N/a	Joined Milan Futuro	
30 June 2024	DF	(Italy) Leonardo D'Alessio	20	(Italy) Pro Sesto	—N/a	Joined Milan Futuro	
30 June 2024	MF	(Italy) Antonio Gala	20	(Italy) Sestri Levante	—N/a	Joined Milan Futuro	
30 June 2024	FW	(Italy) Gabriele Alesi	20	(Italy) Sampdoria	—N/a	Joined Milan Futuro	
30 June 2024	FW	(Italy) Bob Murphy Omoregbe	20	(Italy) Sestri Levante	—N/a	Joined Milan Futuro	
30 June 2024	FW	(Belgium) Divock Origi	29	(England) Nottingham Forest	—N/a	Joined Milan Futuro	
30 June 2024	FW	(Ivory Coast) Chaka Traorè	19	(Italy) Palermo	—N/a	Joined Milan Futuro	

Total spending: ▼€74.3M

==== Out ====
Date	Pos.	Player	Age	Moving to	Fee	Notes	Source
19 February 2024	MF	(Bosnia and Herzegovina) Rade Krunić	30	(Turkey) Fenerbahçe	€3,500,000	From loan to definitive purchase	
14 May 2024	FW	(France) Olivier Giroud	37	(United States) Los Angeles FC	Free	End of contract	
10 June 2024	DF	(France) (Democratic Republic of the Congo) Clinton Nsiala	20	(Scotland) Rangers	Free	End of contract, from Primavera squad	
15 June 2024	FW	(Belgium) Charles De Ketelaere	23	(Italy) Atalanta	€22,000,000	From loan to definitive purchase	
30 June 2024	GK	(Italy) Antonio Mirante	40	—N/a	Free	End of contract	
30 June 2024	DF	(Italy) Mattia Caldara	29	(Italy) Modena	Free	End of contract	
30 June 2024	DF	(Denmark) Simon Kjær	35	Retired			
1 July 2024	FW	(Italy) (Colombia) Maikol Cifuentes	19	(Portugal) Lusitânia	Free	After return from loan, from Primavera squad	
12 July 2024	GK	(Italy) Andrea Bartoccioni	20	(Italy) Renate	Undisclosed	From Primavera squad	
15 July 2024	FW	(Sweden) (The Gambia) Emil Roback	21	(Thailand) Muangthong United	Undisclosed	—N/a	
16 July 2024	DF	(Italy) Tommaso Cecotti	18	(Italy) Carpi	Undisclosed	From loan to definitive purchase	
23 July 2024	DF	(Serbia) Jan-Carlo Simić	19	(Belgium) Anderlecht	€3,000,000	—N/a	
30 July 2024	DF	(Finland) Axel Sandler	17	(Sweden) AIK	Undisclosed	From Primavera squad	
31 July 2024	FW	(Italy) Daniel Maldini	22	(Italy) Monza	Undisclosed	From loan to definitive purchase	
20 August 2024	FW	(Italy) Marco Nasti	20	(Italy) Cremonese	Undisclosed	From Milan Futuro	

==== Loans out ====
Date	Pos.	Player	Age	Moving to	Fee	Notes	Source
18 June 2024	FW	(Serbia) Marko Lazetić	20	(Serbia) TSC	Free	After return from loan	
18 July 2024	GK	(Colombia) Devis Vásquez	26	(Italy) Empoli	Free	After return from loan	
23 July 2024	FW	(Argentina) Luka Romero	19	(Spain) Alavés	Free	After return from loan	
31 July 2024	FW	(Italy) Lorenzo Colombo	22	(Italy) Empoli	Free	After return from loan	
10 August 2024	DF	(Argentina) Marco Pellegrino	22	(Argentina) Independiente	Free	After return from loan	
21 August 2024	DF	(France) Pierre Kalulu	24	(Italy) Juventus	€3,300,000	With option to buy	
24 August 2024	MF	(Italy) Tommaso Pobega	25	(Italy) Bologna	Free	With option to buy	
28 August 2024	MF	(France) Yacine Adli	24	(Italy) Fiorentina	€1,500,000	With option to buy	
30 August 2024	FW	(Belgium) Alexis Saelemaekers	25	(Italy) Roma	Free	After return from loan	

Total income: ▲€33.3M

=== Winter window ===
==== In ====
Date	Pos.	Player	Age	Moving from	Fee	Notes	Source
2 January 2025	FW	(Italy) Andrea Magrassi	31	(Italy) Cittadella	Undisclosed	Joined Milan Futuro	
17 January 2025	DF	(Italy) Michele Camporese	32	(Italy) Cosenza	Undisclosed	Joined Milan Futuro	
21 January 2025	DF	(Italy) Ettore Quirini	21	(Italy) Lucchese	Undisclosed	Joined Milan Futuro	
3 February 2025	FW	(Mexico) Santiago Giménez	23	(Netherlands) Feyenoord	€32,000,000	—N/a	
3 February 2025	MF	(Italy) Simone Branca	32	(Italy) Cittadella	Undisclosed	Joined Milan Futuro	
3 February 2025	MF	(France) Warren Bondo	21	(Italy) Monza	€10,000,000	—N/a	
3 February 2025	FW	(Germany) (Cameroon) Levis Asanji	19	(Germany) Union Berlin	Undisclosed	Joined Primavera squad	

==== Loans in ====
Date	Pos.	Player	Age	Moving from	Fee	Notes	Source
17 January 2025	FW	(Italy) Simone Ianesi	22	(Italy) Pontedera	Undisclosed	Joined Milan Futuro	
24 January 2025	DF	(England) Kyle Walker	34	(England) Manchester City	Undisclosed	With option to buy	
3 February 2025	FW	(Italy) Riccardo Sottil	25	(Italy) Fiorentina	€1,000,000	With option to buy	
3 February 2025	FW	(Portugal) João Félix	25	(England) Chelsea	€5,500,000	—N/a	

Total spending: ▼€48.5M

==== Out ====
Date	Pos.	Player	Age	Moving to	Fee	Notes	Source
18 January 2025	FW	(Argentina) Luka Romero	20	(Mexico) Cruz Azul	€3,300,000	After return from loan	
21 January 2025	DF	(Senegal) Fodé Ballo-Touré	28	(France) Le Havre	Free	From Milan Futuro	
29 January 2025	FW	(Italy) Samuele Longo	33	(Spain) Antequera	Free	From Milan Futuro	
29 January 2025	MF	(Italy) Antonio Gala	20	(Italy) Foggia	Undisclosed	From Milan Futuro	
3 February 2025	MF	(Paraguay) Hugo Cuenca	20	(Italy) Genoa	Free	From Milan Futuro	
3 February 2025	MF	(Poland) Dariusz Stalmach	19	(Germany) 1. FC Magdeburg	€250,000	From Milan Futuro	

==== Loans ended ====
Date	Pos.	Player	Age	Moving to	Fee	Notes	Source
30 January 2025	GK	(Italy) Davide Mastrantonio	21	(Italy) Roma	—N/a	Anticipated end of loan, from Milan Futuro	

==== Loans out ====
Date	Pos.	Player	Age	Moving to	Fee	Notes	Source
18 January 2025	DF	(Argentina) Marco Pellegrino	22	(Argentina) Huracán	Free	After return from loan	
2 February 2025	FW	(Spain) Álvaro Morata	32	(Turkey) Galatasaray	€6,000,000	With option to buy	
3 February 2025	DF	(Italy) Davide Calabria	28	(Italy) Bologna	Undisclosed	—N/a	
3 February 2025	FW	(Switzerland) Noah Okafor	23	(Italy) Napoli	€1,500,000	With option to buy	
3 February 2025	MF	(Italy) Kevin Zeroli	20	(Italy) Monza	Undisclosed	—N/a	
3 February 2025	MF	(Algeria) Ismaël Bennacer	27	(France) Marseille	€1,000,000	With option to buy	

Total income: ▲€12.05M

== Pre-season and friendlies ==
Win Draw Loss Fixtures

20 July 2024 Friendly	Rapid Wien	1–1	Milan	Vienna, Austria
17:30 CDT (UTC−5)	Demir 88'	Report	Florenzi 64'	Stadium: Allianz Stadion; Attendance: 24,500; Referee: Patrick Koscielnicki (Austria)

27 July 2024 FC Series; Soccer Champions Tour	Manchester City	2–3	Milan	New York City, United States
18:00 EDT (UTC−4)	Haaland 19'; McAtee 55'	Report	Colombo 30', 34'; Saelemaekers (yellow card) 73'; Nasti 78'	Stadium: Yankee Stadium; Attendance: 46,122; Referee: Serhiy Boyko (Ukraine)

31 July 2024 Soccer Champions Tour	Real Madrid	0–1	Milan	Chicago, United States
19:30 CDT (UTC−5)		Report	Chukwueze 55'; Bakoune (yellow card) 86'	Stadium: Soldier Field; Referee: Rubiel Vazquez (United States)

6 August 2024 Soccer Champions Tour	Barcelona	2–2 (3–4 p)	Milan	Baltimore, United States
19:30 EDT (UTC−4)	Lewandowski 22', 58'; Martín (yellow card) 37'; Casadó (yellow card) 69'; Junyent (yellow card) 84'; G. Fernández (yellow card) 86'	Report	Jović 10'; Pulisic 15'; Saelemaekers (yellow card) 46'; Bennacer (yellow card) 89'	Stadium: M&T Bank Stadium; Attendance: 51,337; Referee: Victor Rivas (United States)
	Penalties
	Koundé (penalty missed); Junyent (penalty missed); Bernal (penalty scored); T. Fernández (penalty scored); Vitor Roque (penalty scored); Faye (penalty missed)		(penalty missed) Bennacer; (penalty scored) Calabria; (penalty scored) Okafor; (penalty missed) Kalulu; (penalty scored) Adli; (penalty scored) Zeroli

13 August 2024 Trofeo Silvio Berlusconi	Milan	3–1	Monza	Milan, Italy
21:00 CEST (UTC+2)	Saelemaekers 11'; Jović 47'; Reijnders 56'	Report	Maldini 34'	Stadium: San Siro; Attendance: 54,089; Referee: Antonio Giua

== Competitions ==
=== Overall record ===
Competition	First match	Last match	Starting round	Final position	Record							
Competition	First match	Last match	Starting round	Final position	Pld	W	D	L	GF	GA	GD	Win %
Serie A	17 August 2024	24 May 2025	Matchday 1	8th	38	18	9	11	61	43	+18	47.37
Coppa Italia	3 December 2024	14 May 2025	Round of 16	Runners-up	5	3	1	1	13	4	+9	60.00
Supercoppa Italiana	3 January 2025	6 January 2025	Semi-finals	Winners	2	2	0	0	5	3	+2	100.00
UEFA Champions League	17 September 2024	18 February 2025	League phase	Knockout phase play-offs	10	5	1	4	15	13	+2	50.00
Total					55	28	11	16	94	63	+31	50.91

Source: Soccerway

=== Serie A ===
==== League table ====
Pos	Team	Pld	W	D	L	GF	GA	GD	Pts	Qualification or relegation
6	Fiorentina	38	19	8	11	60	41	+19	65 (Note: Fiorentina finished ahead of Lazio on head-to-head points: Fiorentina 2–1 Lazio, Lazio 1–2 Fiorentina.)	Qualification for the Conference League play-off round
7	Lazio	38	18	11	9	61	49	+12	65	
8	Milan	38	18	9	11	61	43	+18	63	
9	Bologna	38	16	14	8	57	47	+10	62	Qualification for the Europa League league phase (Note: Bologna qualified for the Europa League league stage as the winners of the 2024–25 Coppa Italia.)
10	Como	38	13	10	15	49	52	−3	49	

Source: Serie A
Rules for classification: 1) Points; 2) Tiebreaker for Champions team and third relegated team; 3) Head-to-head points; 4) Head-to-head goal difference; 5) Goal difference; 6) Goals scored; 7) Draw.
(Note: Head-to-head record is used only after all the matches between the teams in question have been played)

==== Results summary ====
Overall								Home						Away					
Pld	W	D	L	GF	GA	GD	Pts	W	D	L	GF	GA	GD	W	D	L	GF	GA	GD
38	18	9	11	61	43	+18	63	9	7	3	30	16	+14	9	2	8	31	27	+4

Source: Serie A

==== Results by round ====
Round	1	2	3	4	5	6	7	8	10	11	12	13	14	15	16	17	18	20	19^{1}	21	22	23	24	25	26	9^{2}	27	28	29	30	31	32	33	34	35	36	37	38
Ground	H	A	A	H	A	H	A	H	H	A	A	H	H	A	H	A	H	H	A	A	H	H	A	H	A	A	H	A	H	A	H	A	H	A	A	H	A	H
Result	D	L	D	W	W	W	L	W	L	W	D	D	W	L	D	W	D	D	W	L	W	D	W	W	L	L	L	W	W	L	D	W	L	W	W	W	L	W
Position	5	14	14	10	7	3	6	4	8	7	7	7	7	7	8	8	8	8	7	8	7	8	7	7	7	8	9	9	9	9	9	9	9	9	9	8	9	8

Source: Serie A
A = Away; H = Home; W = Win; D = Draw; L = Loss; P = Postponed

^{1} Matchday 19 (vs Como) was postponed due to Milan's participation in the Supercoppa Italiana.
^{2} Matchday 9 (vs Bologna) was postponed due to heavy rain and flooding.

==== Matches ====
The league fixtures were released on 4 July 2024.

17 August 2024 1	Milan	2–2	Torino	Milan
20:45 CEST (UTC+2)	Jović (yellow card) 57'; Morata 89', (yellow card) 90'; Okafor 90+5'	Report	Thiaw 30' (o.g.); Vojvoda (yellow card) 45+2'; Ricci (yellow card) 45+3'; Zapata 68'; Tameze (yellow card) 90'; Dembélé (yellow card) 90+7'	Stadium: San Siro; Attendance: 70,742; Referee: Fabio Maresca

24 August 2024 2	Parma	2–1	Milan	Parma
18:30 CEST (UTC+2)	Man 2'; Cancellieri 77'	Report	Pavlović (yellow card) 34'; Pulisic 66'; Emerson (yellow card) 88'; Loftus-Cheek (yellow card) 90+2'	Stadium: Stadio Ennio Tardini; Attendance: 21,808; Referee: Juan Luca Sacchi

31 August 2024 3	Lazio	2–2	Milan	Rome
20:45 CEST (UTC+2)	Rovella (yellow card) 39'; Castellanos 62'; Zaccagni (yellow card) 64'; Dia 66'; Patric (yellow card) 85'; Guendouzi (yellow card) 90+3'	Report	Pavlović 8'; Fofana (yellow card) 20'; Leão 72'; Terracciano (yellow card) 90+1'	Stadium: Stadio Olimpico; Attendance: 53,000; Referee: Davide Massa

14 September 2024 4	Milan	4–0	Venezia	Milan
20:45 CEST (UTC+2)	Hernandez 2'; Fofana 16'; Pulisic 25' (pen.); Abraham 29' (pen.); Gabbia (yellow card) 38'	Report	Schingtienne (yellow card) 28'; Nicolussi Caviglia (yellow card) 67' (yellow-red card) 73'	Stadium: San Siro; Attendance: 71,273; Referee: Davide Di Marco

22 September 2024 5	Internazionale	1–2	Milan	Milan
20:45 CEST (UTC+2)	Mkhitaryan (yellow card) 18'; Dimarco 27', (yellow card) 88'; Çalhanoğlu (yellow card) 40'; Asllani (yellow card) 86'	Report	Pulisic 10'; Fofana (yellow card) 38'; Gabbia 89'	Stadium: Stadio Giuseppe Meazza; Attendance: 75,366; Referee: Maurizio Mariani

27 September 2024 6	Milan	3–0	Lecce	Milan
20:45 CEST (UTC+2)	Morata 38'; Hernandez 41'; Pulisic 43'; Emerson (yellow card) 49'; Bartesaghi (red card) 80'	Report	Baschirotto (yellow card) 34'	Stadium: San Siro; Attendance: 71,103; Referee: Luca Zufferli

6 October 2024 7	Fiorentina	2–1	Milan	Florence
20:45 CEST (UTC+2)	Dodô (yellow card) 8'; Kean (penalty missed) 22'; Adli 35'; Guðmundsson 73'; Bove (yellow card) 90+5'	Report	Tomori (yellow card) 24'; Morata (yellow card) 43'; Hernandez (penalty missed) 45+1', (red card) 90+6'; Abraham (penalty missed) 56'; Pulisic 60'; Reijnders (yellow card) 72'	Stadium: Stadio Artemio Franchi; Attendance: 21,923; Referee: Luca Pairetto

19 October 2024 8	Milan	1–0	Udinese	Milan
18:00 CEST (UTC+2)	Chukwueze 13'; Reijnders (red card) 29'; Terracciano (yellow card) 49'; Maignan (yellow card) 89'	Report	Bijol (yellow card) 43'; Lucca (yellow card) 82'; Kamara (yellow card) 89'	Stadium: San Siro; Attendance: 71,018; Referee: Daniele Chiffi

29 October 2024 10	Milan	0–2	Napoli	Milan
20:45 CET (UTC+1)		Report	Lukaku 5'; Kvaratskhelia 43'; Olivera (yellow card) 73'	Stadium: San Siro; Attendance: 73,507; Referee: Andrea Colombo

2 November 2024 11	Monza	0–1	Milan	Monza
20:45 CET (UTC+1)	Đurić (yellow card) 53'; Bondo (yellow card) 83'	Report	Reijnders 43'; Morata (yellow card) 47'	Stadium: Stadio Brianteo; Attendance: 17,000; Referee: Ermanno Feliciani

9 November 2024 12	Cagliari	3–3	Milan	Cagliari
18:00 CET (UTC+1)	Zortea 2'; Zappa 53', 89'	Report	Leão 15', 40'; Fofana (yellow card) 61'; Abraham 69'; Hernandez (yellow card) 90+1'	Stadium: Unipol Domus; Attendance: 16,271; Referee: Michael Fabbri

23 November 2024 13	Milan	0–0	Juventus	Milan
18:00 CET (UTC+1)	Leão (yellow card) 26'; Emerson (yellow card) 67'; Fofana (yellow card) 69'	Report	Gatti (yellow card) 27'; Locatelli (yellow card) 87'	Stadium: San Siro; Attendance: 75,502; Referee: Daniele Chiffi

30 November 2024 14	Milan	3–0	Empoli	Milan
18:00 CET (UTC+1)	Morata 19'; Gabbia (yellow card) 25'; Reijnders 44', 69'; Musah (yellow card) 57'	Report	Colombo (yellow card) 35'; Henderson (yellow card) 67'	Stadium: San Siro; Attendance: 68,725; Referee: Federico Dionisi

6 December 2024 15	Atalanta	2–1	Milan	Bergamo
20:45 CET (UTC+1)	De Ketelaere 12', (yellow card) 55'; Bellanova (yellow card) 71'; Lookman 87'	Report	Morata 22'	Stadium: Gewiss Stadium; Attendance: 22,606; Referee: Federico La Penna

15 December 2024 16	Milan	0–0	Genoa	Milan
20:45 CET (UTC+1)		Report	Vogliacco (yellow card) 22'; Zanoli (yellow card) 42'	Stadium: San Siro; Attendance: 70,078; Referee: Marco Guida

20 December 2024 17	Hellas Verona	0–1	Milan	Verona
20:45 CET (UTC+1)	Dawidowicz (yellow card) 35'	Report	Emerson (yellow card) 25'; Reijnders 56'	Stadium: Stadio Marcantonio Bentegodi; Attendance: 23,635; Referee: Livio Marinelli

29 December 2024 18	Milan	1–1	Roma	Milan
20:45 CET (UTC+1)	Reijnders 16', (yellow card) 82'; Hernandez (yellow card) 43'; Morata (yellow card) 44'; Gabbia (yellow card) 90+4'	Report	Koné (yellow card) 4'; Hummels (yellow card) 13'; Dybala 23'; Paredes (yellow card) 67'; Çelik (yellow card) 71'	Stadium: San Siro; Attendance: 74,283; Referee: Michael Fabbri

11 January 2025 20	Milan	1–1	Cagliari	Milan
20:45 CET (UTC+1)	Morata 51'; Jiménez (yellow card) 82'	Report	Felici (yellow card) 41'; Zortea 55'; Piccoli (yellow card) 90+1'	Stadium: San Siro; Attendance: 69,263; Referee: Matteo Marchetti

14 January 2025 19	Como	1–2	Milan	Como
18:30 CET (UTC+1)	Diao 60'; Kempf (yellow card) 65'	Report	Morata (yellow card) 20'; Bennacer (yellow card) 33'; Thiaw (yellow card) 43'; Jiménez (yellow card) 53'; Musah (yellow card) 56'; Hernandez 71'; Leão 76', (yellow card) 85'	Stadium: Stadio Giuseppe Sinigaglia; Attendance: 13,602; Referee: Gianluca Manganiello
Note: The match was originally scheduled for 5 January 2025, but was postponed due to Milan's participation in the Supercoppa Italiana.

18 January 2025 21	Juventus	2–0	Milan	Turin
18:00 CET (UTC+1)	Mbangula 59'; Weah 64'	Report	Bennacer (yellow card) 61'; Emerson (yellow card) 72'	Stadium: Juventus Stadium; Attendance: 40,784; Referee: Davide Massa

26 January 2025 22	Milan	3–2	Parma	Milan
12:30 CET (UTC+1)	Pavlović (yellow card) 12'; Pulisic 38' (pen.); Fofana (yellow card) 43'; Reijnders 90+2'; Chukwueze 90+5'	Report	Cancellieri 24'; Vogliacco (yellow card) 33'; Sohm (yellow card) 37'; Del Prato (yellow card) 46', (goal) 80'; Haj Mohamed (yellow card) 74'; Hainaut (yellow card) 85'	Stadium: San Siro; Attendance: 72,304; Referee: Rosario Abisso

2 February 2025 23	Milan	1–1	Internazionale	Milan
18:00 CET (UTC+1)	Reijnders 45'	Report	Bastoni (yellow card) 53'; Dumfries (yellow card) 61'; De Vrij 90+3'	Stadium: San Siro; Attendance: 75,493; Referee: Daniele Chiffi

8 February 2025 24	Empoli	0–2	Milan	Empoli
18:00 CET (UTC+1)	Henderson (yellow card) 45+3'; Grassi (yellow card) 62'; Marianucci (red card) 65'	Report	Félix (yellow card) 18'; Tomori (yellow card) 36' (yellow-red card) 55'; Giménez (yellow card) 65', (goal) 76'; Leão 68'	Stadium: Stadio Carlo Castellani; Attendance: 14,500; Referee: Luca Pairetto

15 February 2025 25	Milan	1–0	Hellas Verona	Milan
20:45 CET (UTC+1)	Musah (yellow card) 16'; Jiménez (yellow card) 59'; Giménez 75', (yellow card) 79'	Report	Coppola (yellow card) 11'; Niasse (yellow card) 21'; Bradarić (yellow card) 43'; Duda (yellow card) 50'	Stadium: San Siro; Attendance: 69,578; Referee: Francesco Fourneau

22 February 2025 26	Torino	2–1	Milan	Turin
18:00 CET (UTC+1)	Thiaw 5' (o.g.); Ricci (yellow card) 27'; Gineitis 76'	Report	Musah (yellow card) 16'; Pulisic (penalty missed) 33'; Reijnders 74'	Stadium: Stadio Olimpico Grande Torino; Attendance: 26,868; Referee: Simone Sozza

27 February 2025 9	Bologna	2–1	Milan	Bologna
20:45 CET (UTC+1)	Castro 48'; Casale (yellow card) 53'; Ndoye 82'	Report	Leão 43'; Hernandez (yellow card) 47'; Thiaw (yellow card) 54'	Stadium: Stadio Renato Dall'Ara; Attendance: 31,784; Referee: Maurizio Mariani
Note: The match was originally scheduled for 26 October 2024, but was postponed due to heavy rain and flooding.

2 March 2025 27	Milan	1–2	Lazio	Milan
20:45 CET (UTC+1)	Pavlović (red card) 67'; Giménez (yellow card) 76'; Leão (yellow card) 80'; Chukwueze 84'	Report	Zaccagni 28'; Vecino (yellow card) 90+2'; Pedro 90+8' (pen.)	Stadium: San Siro; Attendance: 65,969; Referee: Gianluca Manganiello

8 March 2025 28	Lecce	2–3	Milan	Lecce
18:00 CET (UTC+1)	Krstović 7', 59', (yellow card) 90+1'; Berisha (yellow card) 42'	Report	Gallo 68' (o.g.); Pulisic 73' (pen.), 81'; Abraham (yellow card) 88'	Stadium: Stadio Via del mare Attendance: 25,753; Referee: Daniele Doveri

15 March 2025 29	Milan	2–1	Como	Milan
18:00 CET (UTC+1)	Bondo (yellow card) 10'; Pulisic 53'; Reijnders 75'; Musah (yellow card) 48'; Jiménez (yellow card) 79'	Report	Da Cunha 33'; Perrone (yellow card) 68'; Strefezza (yellow card) 79'; Paz (yellow card) 90'; Alli (red card) 90+1'	Stadium: San Siro; Attendance: 74,800; Referee: Matteo Marchetti

30 March 2025 30	Napoli	2–1	Milan	Naples
20:45 CEST (UTC+2)	Politano 2'; Lukaku 19', (yellow card) 40'	Report	Giménez (penalty missed) 69'; Jović 84'; Jiménez (yellow card) 90'	Stadium: Stadio Diego Armando Maradona; Attendance: 52,836; Referee: Simone Sozza

5 April 2025 31	Milan	2–2	Fiorentina	Milan
20:45 CEST (UTC+2)	Abraham 23'; Hernandez (yellow card) 41'; Walker (yellow card) 45+4'; Leão (yellow card) 58'; Pulisic (yellow card) 58'; Jović 64'	Report	Thiaw 7' (o.g.); Kean 10'; Marí (yellow card) 31'; Dodô (yellow card) 41'; De Gea (yellow card) 66'	Stadium: San Siro; Attendance: 72,451; Referee: Giovanni Ayroldi

11 April 2025 32	Udinese	0–4	Milan	Udine
20:45 CEST (UTC+2)	Bijol (yellow card) 74'	Report	Leão 42'; Pavlović 45'; Hernandez 74'; Reijnders 81'; Terracciano (yellow card) 89'	Stadium: Stadio Friuli; Attendance: 24,214; Referee: Juan Luca Sacchi

20 April 2025 33	Milan	0–1	Atalanta	Milan
20:45 CEST (UTC+2)		Report	Cuadrado (yellow card) 56'; Éderson 62'	Stadium: San Siro; Attendance: 72,745; Referee: Marco Piccinini

27 April 2025 34	Venezia	0–2	Milan	Venice
12:30 CEST (UTC+2)	Candé (yellow card) 55'	Report	Pulisic 5'; Giménez 90+6'	Stadium: Stadio Pier Luigi Penzo; Attendance: 12,048; Referee: Gianluca Manganiello

5 May 2025 35	Genoa	1–2	Milan	Genoa
20:45 CEST (UTC+2)	Thorsby (yellow card) 27'; Vitinha 61'	Report	Pavlović (yellow card) 21'; Loftus-Cheek (yellow card) 69'; Leão 76', (yellow card) 82'; Frendrup 77' (o.g.); Gabbia (yellow card) 84'; Félix (yellow card) 90+2'	Stadium: Stadio Luigi Ferraris; Attendance: 32,081; Referee: Giuseppe Collu

9 May 2025 36	Milan	3–1	Bologna	Milan
20:45 CEST (UTC+2)	Loftus-Cheek (yellow card) 60'; Félix (yellow card) 67'; Giménez 73', 90+2'; Pulisic 79'	Report	Lucumí (yellow card) 37'; Orsolini 49'; Castro (yellow card) 90+1'	Stadium: San Siro; Attendance: 71,076; Referee: Livio Marinelli

18 May 2025 37	Roma	3–1	Milan	Rome
20:45 CEST (UTC+2)	Mancini 3', (yellow card) 25'; Cristante (yellow card) 45', (goal) 87'; Paredes 58'; Çelik (yellow card) 61'	Report	Giménez (red card) 21'; Félix 39'; Jiménez (yellow card) 62'; Tomori (yellow card) 90'	Stadium: Stadio Olimpico; Attendance: 74,283; Referee: Marco Piccinini

24 May 2025 38	Milan	2–0	Monza	Milan
20:45 CEST (UTC+2)	Gabbia 64'; Félix 74'	Report	Bianco (yellow card) 51'	Stadium: San Siro; Attendance: 69,124; Referee: Daniele Rutella

=== Coppa Italia ===
3 December 2024 Round of 16	Milan	6–1	Sassuolo	Milan
21:00 CET (UTC+1)	Chukwueze 12', 21'; Reijnders 17'; Leão 23'; Calabria 56'; Abraham 61'; Terracciano (yellow card) 80'	Report	Paz (yellow card) 39'; Mulattieri 59'; Odenthal (yellow card) 64'	Stadium: San Siro; Attendance: 31,392; Referee: Kevin Bonacina

5 February 2025 Quarter-finals	Milan	3–1	Roma	Milan
21:00 CET (UTC+1)	Abraham 16', 42'; Félix 71'	Report	Dovbyk 54'; Koné (yellow card) 70'	Stadium: San Siro; Attendance: 57,878; Referee: Marco Piccinini

2 April 2025 Semi-finals; First leg	Milan	1–1	Internazionale	Milan
21:00 CET (UTC+1)	Hernandez (yellow card) 19'; Abraham 47'; Reijnders (yellow card) 89'	Report	Acerbi (yellow card) 53'; Bisseck (yellow card) 58'; Çalhanoğlu 67'	Stadium: San Siro; Attendance: 67,595; Referee: Michael Fabbri

23 April 2025 Semi-finals; Second leg	Internazionale	0–3 (1–4 agg.)	Milan	Milan
21:00 CEST (UTC+2)	Çalhanoğlu (yellow card) 71'	Report	Jović 36', 49'; Reijnders 85'	Stadium: San Siro; Attendance: 75,552; Referee: Daniele Doveri

14 May 2025 Final	Milan	0–1	Bologna	Rome
21:00 CEST (UTC+2)	Tomori (yellow card) 38'; Pulisic (yellow card) 45+2'	Report	Ferguson (yellow card) 43'; Ndoye 53'; Fabbian (yellow card) 57'; Lucumí (yellow card) 74'	Stadium: Stadio Olimpico; Attendance: 68,490; Referee: Maurizio Mariani

=== Supercoppa Italiana ===
3 January 2025 Semi-finals	Juventus	1–2	Milan	Riyadh, Saudi Arabia
22:00 SAST (UTC+3)	Yıldız 21'; McKennie (yellow card) 45+1'	Report	Pulisic 71' (pen.), (yellow card) 82'; Gatti 75' (o.g.); Emerson (yellow card) 79'	Stadium: King Saud University Stadium; Attendance: 24,783; Referee: Andrea Colombo

6 January 2025 Final	Internazionale	2–3	Milan	Riyadh, Saudi Arabia
22:00 SAST (UTC+3)	L. Martínez 45+1'; Taremi 47'; Mkhitaryan (yellow card) 51'; Dumfries (yellow card) 54'; Barella (yellow card) 72'; Bastoni (yellow card) 89'	Report	Hernandez 52'; Tomori (yellow card) 57'; Pulisic 80'; Abraham 90+3'	Stadium: King Saud University Stadium; Attendance: 24,841; Referee: Simone Sozza

=== UEFA Champions League ===
==== League phase ====
The league phase draw was held on 29 August 2024.

Pos	Team	Pld	W	D	L	GF	GA	GD	Pts	Qualification
11	(Royal Spanish Football Federation) Real Madrid	8	5	0	3	20	12	+8	15 (Note: Tied on points (15), goal difference (+8), goals scored (20), away goals (6) and wins (5). Ranked on away wins: Real Madrid 2, Bayern Munich 1.)	Advance to knockout phase play-offs (seeded)
12	(German Football Association) Bayern Munich	8	5	0	3	20	12	+8	15	Advance to knockout phase play-offs (seeded)
13	(Italian Football Federation) Milan	8	5	0	3	14	11	+3	15	Advance to knockout phase play-offs (seeded)
14	(Royal Dutch Football Association) PSV Eindhoven	8	4	2	2	16	12	+4	14	Advance to knockout phase play-offs (seeded)
15	(French Football Federation) Paris Saint-Germain	8	4	1	3	14	9	+5	13	Advance to knockout phase play-offs (seeded)

Source: UEFA
Rules for classification: League phase tiebreakers
Notes:

Round	1	2	3	4	5	6	7	8
Ground	H	A	H	A	A	H	H	A
Result	L	L	D	L	D	W	W	W
Position	21	35	27	36	34	28	23	18
Points	0	0	1	1	2	5	8	11

Source: UEFA
A = Away; H = Home; W = Win; D = Draw; L = Loss

17 September 2024 1	Milan (Italy)	1–3	(England) Liverpool	Milan, Italy
21:00 CEST (UTC+2)	Pulisic 3'; Calabria (yellow card) 22'; Fofana (yellow card) 31'	Report	Konaté 23', (yellow card) 80'; Van Dijk 41'; Mac Allister (yellow card) 53'; Szoboszlai 67'	Stadium: San Siro; Attendance: 59,826; Referee: Espen Eskås (Norway)

1 October 2024 2	Bayer Leverkusen (Germany)	1–0	(Italy) Milan	Leverkusen, Germany
21:00 CEST (UTC+2)	García (yellow card) 8'; Boniface 51'; Frimpong (yellow card) 74'	Report	Morata (yellow card) 84'; Chukwueze (yellow card) 90+4'; Tomori (yellow card) 90+5'	Stadium: BayArena; Attendance: 30,210; Referee: Sandro Schärer (Switzerland)

22 October 2024 3	Milan (Italy)	3–1	(Belgium) Club Brugge	Milan, Italy
18:45 CEST (UTC+2)	Pulisic 35'; Leão (yellow card) 50'; Morata (yellow card) 59'; Reijnders 61', 71'; Gabbia (yellow card) 71'; Camarda (yellow card) 88'	Report	Seys (yellow card) 20'; Jashari (yellow card) 23'; Onyedika (red card) 40'; Sabbe 51'; Skóraś (yellow card) 73'	Stadium: San Siro; Attendance: 58,649; Referee: Felix Zwayer (Germany)

5 November 2024 4	Real Madrid (Spain)	1–3	(Italy) Milan	Madrid, Spain
21:00 CET (UTC+1)	Vinícius 23' (pen.), (yellow card) 71'; Camavinga (yellow card) 58'; Vazquez (yellow card) 68'; Militão (yellow card) 68'	Report	Thiaw 12'; Morata (yellow card) 21', (goal) 39'; Reijnders 73'; Fofana (yellow card) 85'	Stadium: Santiago Bernabéu; Attendance: 75,561; Referee: Slavko Vinčić (Slovenia)

26 November 2024 5	Slovan Bratislava (Slovakia)	2–3	(Italy) Milan	Bratislava, Slovakia
18:45 CET (UTC+1)	Barseghyan 24'; Marcelli 88'; Tolić (yellow card) 90' (yellow-red card) 90'; Bajrić (yellow card) 90+6'	Report	Pulisic 21'; Chukwueze (yellow card) 54'; Calabria (yellow card) 58'; Leão 68'; Abraham 71'; Tomori (yellow card) 79'	Stadium: Tehelné pole Attendance: 22,500; Referee: José María Sánchez Martínez (Spain)

11 December 2024 6	Milan (Italy)	2–1	(Serbia) Red Star Belgrade	Milan, Italy
21:00 CET (UTC+1)	Musah (yellow card) 32'; Leão 42'; Hernandez (yellow card) 45'; Tomori (yellow card) 79'; Abraham 87'	Report	Krunić (yellow card) 33'; Radonjić 67'; Djiga (yellow card) 81'	Stadium: San Siro; Attendance: 53,717; Referee: Jesús Gil Manzano (Spain)

22 January 2025 7	Milan (Italy)	1–0	(Spain) Girona	Milan, Italy
21:00 CET (UTC+1)	Leão 37'; Calabria (yellow card) 41'; Hernandez (yellow card) 80'	Report	Gil (yellow card) 59'; Martín (yellow card) 82'	Stadium: San Siro; Attendance: 66,030; Referee: Tobias Stieler (Germany)

29 January 2025 8	Dinamo Zagreb (Croatia)	2–1	(Italy) Milan	Zagreb, Croatia
21:00 CET (UTC+1)	Baturina 19'; Mišić (yellow card) 31'; Pjaca (yellow card) 34', (goal) 60'; Nevistić (yellow card) 90+4'	Report	Pulisic (yellow card) 26', (goal) 53'; Musah (yellow card) 31' (yellow-red card) 39'; Maignan (yellow card) 39'	Stadium: Stadion Maksimir; Attendance: 18,856; Referee: François Letexier (France)

==== Knockout phase ====
===== Knockout phase play-offs =====
The knockout phase play-off draw was held on 31 January 2025.

12 February 2025 First leg	Feyenoord (Netherlands)	1–0	(Italy) Milan	Rotterdam, Netherlands
21:00 CET (UTC+1)	Paixão 3'; Smal (yellow card) 57'; Milambo (yellow card) 62'	Report	Thiaw (yellow card) 51'	Stadium: De Kuip; Attendance: 45,000; Referee: José María Sánchez Martínez (Spain)

18 February 2025 Second leg	Milan (Italy)	1–1 (1–2 agg.)	(Netherlands) Feyenoord	Milan, Italy
18:45 CET (UTC+1)	Giménez 1'; Hernandez (yellow card) 44' (yellow-red card) 51'; Félix (yellow card) 76'; Leão (yellow card) 90+7'	Report	Moder (yellow card) 22'; Carranza 73'; Mitchell (yellow card) 90+3'; Read (red card) 90+7'	Stadium: San Siro; Attendance: 54,749; Referee: Szymon Marciniak (Poland)

== Statistics ==
=== Appearances and goals ===
No.	Pos	Nat	Player	Total		Serie A		Coppa Italia		Supercoppa Italiana		Champions League	
No.	Pos	Nat	Player	Apps	Goals	Apps	Goals	Apps	Goals	Apps	Goals	Apps	Goals
Goalkeepers
16	GK	(France) FRA	Mike Maignan	53	0	37	0	4	0	2	0	10	0
57	GK	(Italy) ITA	Marco Sportiello	3	0	1+1	0	1	0	0	0	0	0
96	GK	(Italy) ITA	Lorenzo Torriani	2	0	0	0	0+1	0	0	0	0+1	0
Defenders
19	DF	(France) FRA	Théo Hernandez	49	5	30+3	4	4	0	2	1	10	0
20	DF	(Spain) ESP	Álex Jiménez	28	0	14+8	0	4	0	2	0	0	0
22	DF	(Brazil) BRA	Emerson Royal	26	0	16+1	0	0	0	2	0	4+3	0
23	DF	(England) ENG	Fikayo Tomori	36	0	19+3	0	4	0	2	0	6+2	0
24	DF	(Italy) ITA	Alessandro Florenzi	1	0	0+1	0	0	0	0	0	0	0
28	DF	(Germany) GER	Malick Thiaw	31	1	19+3	0	1+1	0	2	0	4+1	1
31	DF	(Serbia) SRB	Strahinja Pavlović	35	2	21+3	2	4	0	0	0	6+1	0
32	DF	(England) ENG	Kyle Walker	16	0	7+4	0	2+1	0	0	0	2	0
33	DF	(Italy) ITA	Davide Bartesaghi	7	0	1+3	0	0+2	0	0	0	0+1	0
42	DF	(Italy) ITA	Filippo Terracciano	17	0	6+7	0	1	0	0+1	0	0+2	0
46	DF	(Italy) ITA	Matteo Gabbia	36	2	24+2	2	3	0	0+1	0	5+1	0
Midfielders
8	MF	(England) ENG	Ruben Loftus-Cheek	28	0	10+9	0	1+1	0	0+1	0	4+2	0
14	MF	(Netherlands) NED	Tijjani Reijnders	54	15	36+1	10	5	2	2	0	10	3
29	MF	(France) FRA	Youssouf Fofana	52	1	29+6	1	5	0	2	0	9+1	0
30	MF	(Italy) ITA	Mattia Liberali	1	0	1	0	0	0	0	0	0	0
38	MF	(France) FRA	Warren Bondo	5	0	3+1	0	0+1	0	0	0	0	0
79	MF	(Portugal) POR	João Félix	21	3	8+7	2	0+4	1	0	0	2	0
80	MF	(United States) USA	Yunus Musah	40	0	19+10	0	1+1	0	1+1	0	5+2	0
Forwards
7	FW	(Mexico) MEX	Santiago Giménez	19	6	7+7	5	0+3	0	0	0	2	1
9	FW	(Serbia) SRB	Luka Jović	17	4	6+9	2	2	2	0	0	0	0
10	FW	(Portugal) POR	Rafael Leão	49	12	24+9	8	4+1	1	0+1	0	9+1	3
11	FW	(United States) USA	Christian Pulisic	50	17	29+5	11	4+1	0	2	2	8+1	4
21	FW	(Nigeria) NGR	Samuel Chukwueze	36	5	9+17	3	1+2	2	0	0	1+6	0
73	FW	(Italy) ITA	Francesco Camarda	14	0	1+9	0	0	0	0	0	0+4	0
77	FW	(Italy) ITA	Bob Murphy Omoregbe	1	0	0+1	0	0	0	0	0	0	0
90	FW	(England) ENG	Tammy Abraham	44	10	12+16	3	3+2	4	0+2	1	2+7	2
99	FW	(Italy) ITA	Riccardo Sottil	8	0	1+5	0	0+2	0	0	0	0	0
Players transferred/loaned out during the season
2	DF	(Italy) ITA	Davide Calabria	14	1	4+3	0	1	1	0+1	0	3+2	0
4	MF	(Algeria) ALG	Ismaël Bennacer	8	0	4+2	0	0	0	1	0	1	0
5	DF	(France) FRA	Pierre Kalulu	0	0	0	0	0	0	0	0	0	0
7	FW	(Spain) ESP	Álvaro Morata	25	6	13+3	5	0	0	2	0	6+1	1
17	FW	(Switzerland) SUI	Noah Okafor	17	1	5+6	1	0+1	0	0	0	1+4	0
18	MF	(Italy) ITA	Kevin Zeroli	1	0	0+1	0	0	0	0	0	0	0
32	MF	(Italy) ITA	Tommaso Pobega	0	0	0	0	0	0	0	0	0	0
56	MF	(Belgium) BEL	Alexis Saelemaekers	1	0	1	0	0	0	0	0	0	0
94	MF	(France) FRA	Yacine Adli	0	0	0	0	0	0	0	0	0	0

Source: Competitions

=== Goalscorers ===
Players in italics left the team during the season.

Rank	No.	Pos.	Nat.	Player	Serie A	Coppa Italia	Supercoppa Italiana	Champions League	Total
1	11	MF	(United States)	Christian Pulisic	11	0	2	4	17
2	14	MF	(Netherlands)	Tijjani Reijnders	10	2	0	3	15
3	10	FW	(Portugal)	Rafael Leão	8	1	0	3	12
4	90	FW	(England)	Tammy Abraham	3	4	1	2	10
5	7	FW	(Spain)	Álvaro Morata	5	0	0	1	6
5	7	FW	(Mexico)	Santiago Giménez	5	0	0	1	6
7	21	FW	(Nigeria)	Samuel Chukwueze	3	2	0	0	5
8	19	DF	(France)	Théo Hernandez	4	0	1	0	5
9	9	FW	(Serbia)	Luka Jović	2	2	0	0	4
10	79	MF	(Portugal)	João Félix	2	1	0	0	3
11	31	DF	(Serbia)	Strahinja Pavlović	2	0	0	0	2
11	46	DF	(Italy)	Matteo Gabbia	2	0	0	0	2
13	2	DF	(Italy)	Davide Calabria	0	1	0	0	1
13	17	FW	(Switzerland)	Noah Okafor	1	0	0	0	1
13	28	DF	(Germany)	Malick Thiaw	0	0	0	1	1
13	29	MF	(France)	Youssouf Fofana	1	0	0	0	1
Own goals					2	0	1	0	3
Totals					61	13	5	15	94

=== Assists ===
Players in italics left the team during the season.

Rank	No.	Pos.	Nat.	Player	Serie A	Coppa Italia	Supercoppa Italiana	Champions League	Total
1	10	FW	(Portugal)	Rafael Leão	8	1	1	1	11
2	11	MF	(United States)	Christian Pulisic	9	0	0	1	10
3	29	MF	(France)	Youssouf Fofana	6	1	0	2	9
4	90	FW	(England)	Tammy Abraham	5	1	0	1	7
4	19	DF	(France)	Theo Hernandez	3	2	1	0	6
6	14	MF	(Netherlands)	Tijjani Reijnders	5	0	0	0	5
7	7	FW	(Mexico)	Santiago Giménez	2	1	0	0	3
7	21	FW	(Nigeria)	Samuel Chukwueze	2	0	0	1	3
9	17	FW	(Switzerland)	Noah Okafor	0	1	0	1	2
9	80	MF	(United States)	Yunus Musah	2	0	0	0	2
9	23	DF	(England)	Fikayo Tomori	1	0	0	1	2
9	20	DF	(Spain)	Álex Jiménez	1	1	0	0	2
12	7	FW	(Spain)	Álvaro Morata	0	0	0	1	1
12	8	MF	(England)	Ruben Loftus-Cheek	0	1	0	0	1
12	4	MF	(Algeria)	Ismaël Bennacer	0	0	0	1	1
12	31	DF	(Serbia)	Strahinja Pavlović	1	0	0	0	1
12	28	DF	(Germany)	Malick Thiaw	0	0	0	1	1
Totals					44	9	2	11	67

=== Clean sheets ===
Rank	No.	Pos.	Nat.	Player	Serie A	Coppa Italia	Supercoppa Italiana	Champions League	Total
1	16	GK	(France)	Mike Maignan	12	1	0	1	14
2	N.A.	GK	N.A.	Shared	1	0	0	0	1
3	57	GK	(Italy)	Marco Sportiello	0	0	0	0	0
3	96	GK	(Italy)	Lorenzo Torriani	0	0	0	0	0
Totals					13	1	0	1	15

=== Disciplinary record ===
Players in italics left the team during the season.

No.	Pos.	Nat.	Player	Serie A			Coppa Italia			Supercoppa Italiana			Champions League			Total		
No.	Pos.	Nat.	Player	Yellow card	(yellow card) (yellow-red card)	Red card	Yellow card	(yellow card) (yellow-red card)	Red card	Yellow card	(yellow card) (yellow-red card)	Red card	Yellow card	(yellow card) (yellow-red card)	Red card	Yellow card	(yellow card) (yellow-red card)	Red card
7	FW	(Spain)	Álvaro Morata	5									3			8		
29	MF	(France)	Youssouf Fofana	5									2			7		
23	DF	(England)	Fikayo Tomori	2	1		1			1			3			7	1	
22	DF	(Brazil)	Emerson Royal	5						1						6		
31	DF	(Serbia)	Strahinja Pavlović	3		1										3		1
8	MF	(England)	Ruben Loftus-Cheek	3												3		
42	DF	(Italy)	Filippo Terracciano	3			1									4		
46	DF	(Italy)	Matteo Gabbia	4									1			5		
2	DF	(Italy)	Davide Calabria										3			3		
33	DF	(Italy)	Davide Bartesaghi			1												1
21	FW	(Nigeria)	Samuel Chukwueze										2			2		
14	MF	(Netherlands)	Tijjani Reijnders	2		1	1									3		1
19	DF	(France)	Théo Hernandez	4		1	1						2	1		7	1	1
16	GK	(France)	Mike Maignan	1									1			2		
10	FW	(Portugal)	Rafael Leão	5									2			7		
73	FW	(Italy)	Francesco Camarda										1			1		
80	MF	(United States)	Yunus Musah	5									1	1		6	1	
11	MF	(United States)	Christian Pulisic	1			1			1			1			4		
20	DF	(Spain)	Álex Jiménez	6												6		
4	MF	(Algeria)	Ismaël Bennacer	2												2		
9	FW	(Serbia)	Luka Jović	1												1		
28	DF	(Germany)	Malick Thiaw	2									1			3		
79	MF	(Portugal)	João Félix	3									1			4		
7	FW	(Argentina)	Santiago Giménez	3		1										3		1
90	FW	(England)	Tammy Abraham	1												1		
38	MF	(France)	Warren Bondo	1												1		
32	DF	(England)	Kyle Walker	1												1		
Totals				68	1	5	5	0	0	3	0	0	24	2	0	100	3	5
