= Terracciano =

Terracciano is an Italian surname. Notable people with the surname include:

- Filippo Terracciano (born 2003), Italian footballer
- Pietro Terracciano (born 1990), Italian footballer
