= Lorenzo Torriani =

Italian footballer (born 2005)

Personal information
- Date of birth: 31 January 2005 (age 21)
- Place of birth: Vimodrone, Italy
- Height: 1.97 m (6 ft 6 in)
- Position: Goalkeeper

Team information
- Current team: AC Milan
- Number: 96

Youth career
- 2010–2011: Città di Cologno
- 2011–2024: AC Milan

Senior career*
Years	Team	Apps	(Gls)
2024–	AC Milan	0	(0)
2024–	Milan Futuro (res.)	28	(0)

International career^{‡}
2024–2025	Italy U20	4	(0)
2026–	Italy U21	1	(0)
- * Club domestic league appearances and goals as of 22:45, 10 May 2026 (UTC) ‡ National team caps and goals as of 23:45, 8 June 2026 (UTC)

Lorenzo Torriani (born 31 January 2005) is an Italian professional footballer who plays as a goalkeeper for Serie A club AC Milan.

== Club career ==
Torriani began playing football with Città di Cologno, before joining the youth academy of AC Milan as an under-8 and worked his way up their youth categories.

In 2024 he started appearing as Milan's reserve goalkeeper, and was part of their preseason in the summer of 2024. On 26 June 2024, he signed his first professional contract with Milan until 2027. He made his senior and professional debut with Milan on 17 September 2024, as a substitute in a UEFA Champions League match against English club Liverpool, after the starting goalkeeper, Mike Maignan, was left injured.

On 10 November 2024, Torriani made his debut for the newly created reserve team Milan Futuro, starting in a 2–2 Serie C draw at home against Arezzo.

== International career ==
Torriani is a youth international for Italy, having first been called up to the Italy U20s in September 2024 for a set of Under 20 Elite League matches. In May 2026, he was called up with the Italy U21s for the friendly match against Albania U21 on 8 June 2026.

== Career statistics ==
As of match played 5 November 2026

Appearances and goals by club, season and competition
Club	Season	League			Cup		Europe		Other		Total	
Club	Season	Division	Apps	Goals	Apps	Goals	Apps	Goals	Apps	Goals	Apps	Goals
AC Milan	2024–25	Serie A	0	0	1 (Note: Appearance in Coppa Italia)	0	1 (Note: Appearance in UEFA Champions League)	0	—		2	0
AC Milan	2025–26	Serie A	0	0	0	0	—		0	0	0	0
AC Milan	2026–27	Serie A	0	0	0	0	2 (Note: Appearance in UEFA Europa League)	0	—		2	0
AC Milan	Total		0	0	1	0	3	0	0	0	4	0
Milan Futuro	2024–25	Serie C	6	0	—		—		0	0	6	0
Milan Futuro	2025–26	Serie D	22	0	0	0	—		0	0	22	0
Milan Futuro	Total		28	0	0	0	—		0	0	28	0
Career total			28	0	1	0	3	0	0	0	32	0

== Honours ==
Milan

- Supercoppa Italiana: 2024–25
