= Andrea Mira =

Italian footballer (born 1995)

Personal information
- Date of birth: 17 January 1995 (age 31)
- Place of birth: Italy
- Position: Midfielder

Senior career*
Years	Team	Apps	(Gls)
-2014/15	Inter Milan	0	(0)
2014/2015	A.C. Renate	1	(0)
2015/2016	Piacenza Calcio 1919	9	(0)
2016-2017/18	A.S.D. Varesina	35	(0)
2017/2018	Nuorese Calcio	16	(0)
2018-2019	F.C. Verbano Calcio	20	(6)
2019-2020	Busto 81		
2020-2022	A.S.D. Varesina		
- * Club domestic league appearances and goals

Andrea Mira (born 17 January 1995) is an Italian footballer.
