= Valeri Vladimirov =

Bulgarian footballer (born 2008)

Valeri Vladimirov Валери Владимиров
Personal information
- Full name: Valeri Ivanov Vladimirov
- Date of birth: 4 June 2008 (age 18)
- Place of birth: Plovdiv, Bulgaria
- Height: 1.90 m (6 ft 3 in)
- Position: Centre-back

Team information
- Current team: AC Milan
- Number: 35

Youth career
- –2024: Botev Plovdiv
- 2024–: AC Milan

Senior career*
Years	Team	Apps	(Gls)
2025–	Milan Futuro (res.)	22	(1)
2025–	AC Milan	0	(0)

International career^{‡}
2023–2024	Bulgaria U16	3	(0)
2023–2024	Bulgaria U17	5	(0)
2025–	Bulgaria U19	6	(0)
2026–	Bulgaria U21	3	(0)
- * Club domestic league appearances and goals as of 22:55, 20 September 2026 (UTC) ‡ National team caps and goals as of 23:45, 6 October 2026 (UTC)

Valeri Ivanov Vladimirov (Bulgarian: Валери Иванов Владимиров; born 4 June 2008) is a Bulgarian professional footballer who plays as a centre-back for Serie D club Milan Futuro, the reserve team of Serie A club AC Milan. He is a Bulgarian youth international.

== Club career ==
Vladimirov is a youth product of his local hometown team Botev Plovdiv, with whom he played until 2024. On August of the 2024–25 season, he moved to Italy and signed with Serie A giants AC Milan, initially assigned to the youth sector with eventual plans for his progression through the newly created reserve team Milan Futuro.

On 17 August 2025, Vladimirov received his first call-up with the senior squad by head coach Massimiliano Allegri for the 2–0 win 2025–26 Coppa Italia match against Bari as an unused substitute. After a season with solid and impressive performances with both Milan Futuro, and the Primavera squad, he also ended up getting called up for three matches with the senior squad.

On 12 June 2026, he renewed his contract with AC Milan.

Vladimirov was promoted to AC Milan's senior squad under new head coach Ruben Amorim ahead of the 2026–27 season. He started with Milan Futuro during a 4–3 home win Serie D match against Caldiero Terme on the league's opening match for the season, on 6 September 2026.

== International career ==
Vladimirov is a Bulgarian youth international, having featured with the under-16, under-17 and under-19 teams.

== Career statistics ==
As of match played 20 September 2026

Appearances and goals by club, season and competition
Club	Season	League			Cup (Note: Includes Coppa Italia Serie D)		Continental		Other		Total	
Club	Season	Division	Apps	Goals	Apps	Goals	Apps	Goals	Apps	Goals	Apps	Goals
Milan Futuro	2024–25	Serie C	0	0	—		—		0	0	0	0
Milan Futuro	2025–26	Serie D	18	1	2 (Note: Appearances in Coppa Italia Serie D)	0	—		1 (Note: Appearance in Serie D play-offs)	0	21	1
Milan Futuro	2026–27	Serie D	4	0	0	0	—		0	0	4	0
Milan Futuro	Total		23	1	2	0	0	0	0	0	25	1
AC Milan	2025–26	Serie A	0	0	0	0	—		0	0	0	0
Career total			23	1	2	0	0	0	0	0	25	1
