= Bob Omoregbe =

Italian footballer (born 2003)

Personal information
- Full name: Bob Murphy Omoregbe
- Date of birth: 5 November 2003 (age 23)
- Place of birth: Novara, Italy
- Height: 1.85 m (6 ft 1 in)
- Positions: Winger; forward

Team information
- Current team: Novi Pazar
- Number: 7

Youth career
- –2021: Borgosesia
- 2022–2023: AC Milan

Senior career*
Years	Team	Apps	(Gls)
2021	Borgosesia	20	(7)
2023–2025	AC Milan	1	(0)
2023	→ Torres (loan)	10	(0)
2023–2024	→ Fiorenzuola (loan)	12	(2)
2024	→ Sestri Levante (loan)	12	(1)
2024–2025	Milan Futuro (res.)	19	(1)
2025–	Novi Pazar	21	(3)
- * Club domestic league appearances and goals as of 12 June 2026

Bob Murphy Omoregbe (born 5 November 2003) is an Italian professional footballer who plays as a winger and forward for Serbian SuperLiga club Novi Pazar.

== Early life ==
Omoregbe was born on 5 November 2003 in Novara, Italy. He is of Nigerian descent.

== Club career ==
=== AC Milan ===
Omoregbe started his professional career with Borgosesia in 2021. Six months later, he joined the youth academy of Serie A side AC Milan for an estimated €100,000 fee. In 2023, he was sent on loan to Torres, before being sent on loan to Fiorenzuola the same year. Subsequently, he was sent on loan to Sestri Levante.

Omoregbe returned from loan ahead of the 2024–25 season and immediately joined the newly created Serie C club Milan Futuro, which serves as the reserve team of AC Milan. After the winter break, on 11 January 2025, he was promoted and received his first call-up with AC Milan, for a 1–1 home draw Serie A match against Cagliari, making his debut substituting Rafael Leão at the 88th minute. Following the end of the 2024–25 season, Omoregbe's contract was not renewed and he became a free agent.

=== Novi Pazar ===
On 10 July 2025, he signed with Serbian SuperLiga club Novi Pazar.

== Playing style ==
Regarding France international Ousmane Dembélé and England international Raheem Sterling as his football idols, Omoregbe plays as a winger or as a forward and is known for his speed and technical ability. Right-footed, he received comparisons to future AC Milan teammate and Portugal international Rafael Leão while playing for Borgosesia.

== Career statistics ==
=== Club ===
As of match played 17 May 2025

Appearances and goals by club, season and competition
Club	Season	League			Cup (Note: Includes Coppa Italia Serie D, Coppa Italia Serie C)		Europe		Other		Total	
Club	Season	Division	Apps	Goals	Apps	Goals	Apps	Goals	Apps	Goals	Apps	Goals
Borgosesia	2020–21	Serie D	4	1	0	0	—		—		4	1
Borgosesia	2021–22	Serie D	16	6	1	0	—		—		17	6
Borgosesia	Total		20	7	1	0	—		—		21	7
Torres (loan)	2022–23	Serie C	10	0	—		—		—		10	0
Torres (loan)	Total		10	0	—		—		—		10	0
Fiorenzuola (loan)	2023–24	Serie C	12	2	1	2	—		—		13	4
Fiorenzuola (loan)	Total		12	2	1	2	—		—		13	4
Sestri Levante (loan)	2023–24	Serie C	12	1	—		—		—		12	1
Sestri Levante (loan)	Total		12	1	—		—		—		12	1
Milan Futuro	2024–25	Serie C	17	1	0	0	—		2 (Note: Appearances in Serie C play-out)	0	19	1
Milan Futuro	Total		17	1	0	0	—		2	0	19	1
AC Milan	2024–25	Serie A	1	0	0	0	—		—		1	0
AC Milan	Total		1	0	0	0	—		—		1	0
Career total			72	11	2	2	0	0	2	0	76	13
