= Davide Bartesaghi =

Italian footballer (born 2005)

Personal information
- Date of birth: 29 December 2005 (age 20)
- Place of birth: Erba, Italy
- Height: 1.93 m (6 ft 4 in)
- Positions: Left-back; left wing-back

Team information
- Current team: AC Milan
- Number: 33

Youth career
- 2010–2012: Atalanta
- 2012–2024: AC Milan

Senior career*
Years	Team	Apps	(Gls)
2023–	AC Milan	48	(2)
2024–2025	Milan Futuro	25	(1)

International career^{‡}
2022	Italy U18	3	(0)
2023–2024	Italy U19	14	(0)
2024–2025	Italy U20	5	(0)
2025–	Italy U21	9	(0)
2026–	Italy	2	(0)
- * Club domestic league appearances and goals as of 22:09, 22 November 2026 (UTC) ‡ National team caps and goals as of 16 November 2026

Davide Bartesaghi (born 29 December 2005) is an Italian professional footballer who plays as a left-back for Serie A club AC Milan and the Italy national team.

== Club career ==
Bartesaghi started playing in the youth sector of Atalanta, before joining the youth academy of AC Milan in 2012, aged seven. He started training with the club's first team in the summer of 2023.

On 23 September 2023, he made his senior and professional debut for AC Milan, coming on as a second-half substitute for Alessandro Florenzi in a 1–0 Serie A win over Hellas Verona. On 2 October, he signed his first professional contract with the Rossoneri, penning a deal until 2026. On 13 December, he made his UEFA Champions League debut, coming on as a substitute in a 2–1 away win over Newcastle United in the group stage.

Bartesaghi made his debut for the newly created reserve team Milan Futuro on 10 August 2024, starting for a 3–0 away win Coppa Italia Serie C first round match against Lecco.

== International career ==
Bartesaghi is a youth international for Italy, having been called up to the Italy U19s in 2023.

In May 2026, he was one of the players who were called up with the Italy national senior squad by interim head coach Silvio Baldini, for the friendly matches against Luxembourg and Greece on 3 and 7 June 2026, respectively.

== Style of play ==
Bartesaghi started his youth career as a forward, before being moved onto the wing; he then went on to play as a mezzala, and finally settled as an attacking full-back.

A left-footed player, he has indicated the left-back role in a four-man defense as his preferred position; he can also play either as a left-sided center-back in a back three, or a left wing-back in variations of 3–4–3 or 3–5–2 formations.

== Career statistics ==
=== Club ===
As of match played 22 November 2026

Appearances and goals by club, season and competition
Club	Season	League			National cup (Note: Includes Coppa Italia, Coppa Italia Serie C)		Europe		Other		Total	
Club	Season	Division	Apps	Goals	Apps	Goals	Apps	Goals	Apps	Goals	Apps	Goals
AC Milan	2023–24	Serie A	6	0	1	0	1 (Note: Appearance in UEFA Champions League)	0	—		8	0
AC Milan	2024–25	Serie A	4	0	2	0	1	0	0	0	7	0
AC Milan	2025–26	Serie A	31	2	2	0	—		0	0	33	2
AC Milan	2026–27	Serie A	7	0	0	0	4 (Note: Appearances in UEFA Europa League)	0	—		11	0
AC Milan	Total		48	2	5	0	6	0	0	0	59	2
Milan Futuro	2024–25	Serie C	25	1	4	0	—		2 (Note: Appearances in Serie C play-out)	0	31	1
Career total			73	3	9	0	6	0	2	0	90	3

=== International ===
As of match played 7 June 2026

Appearances and goals by national team and year
National team	Year	Apps	Goals
Italy	2026	2	0
Total		2	0

== Honours ==
AC Milan

- Supercoppa Italiana: 2024–25
