= Gabriele Minotti =

Italian footballer (born 2003)

Personal information
- Date of birth: 13 January 2003 (age 23)
- Place of birth: Carate Brianza, Italy
- Height: 1.90 m (6 ft 3 in)
- Position: Centre-back

Team information
- Current team: Renate
- Number: 73

Youth career
- –2023: Monza
- 2024: AC Milan

Senior career*
Years	Team	Apps	(Gls)
2022–2023	→ Giana Erminio (loan)	35	(2)
2023–2024	Giana Erminio	37	(2)
2024–2026	Milan Futuro (res.)	44	(1)
2026–	Renate	4	(0)
- * Club domestic league appearances and goals as of 23:55, 19 October 2026 (UTC)

Gabriele Minotti (born 13 January 2003) is an Italian professional footballer who plays as a centre-back for Serie C Group A club Renate.

== Club career ==
Minotti was born in Carate Brianza, Italy, and is a youth product of Monza, in 2022 he moved to Giana Erminio, with whom he debuted professionally and played for two seasons.

On July 2024, he joined the newly created AC Milan reserve team, which debuted in Italy's third-tier Serie C competitively for the team's inaugural season during 2024–25. Minotti scored his first goal with Milan Futuro on 12 April 2026, as a starter during a 4–0 away win Serie D match against Brusaporto.

On 12 August 2026, he joined Serie C club Renate as a free agent, after mutually agreeing to terminate his contract with AC Milan, ahead of the 2026–27 season.

== Career statistics ==
As of match played 26 April 2026

Appearances and goals by club, season and competition
Club	Season	League			Cup		Other		Total	
Club	Season	Division	Apps	Goals	Apps	Goals	Apps	Goals	Apps	Goals
Giana Erminio (loan)	2022–23	Serie D	35	2	—		1 (Note: Appearance in Serie D play-off)	0	36	2
Giana Erminio	2023–24	Serie C	37	2	—		—		37	2
Giana Erminio	Total		72	4	—		1	0	73	4
Milan Futuro	2024–25	Serie C	27	0	—		2 (Note: Appearances in Serie C play-out)	0	29	0
Milan Futuro	2025–26	Serie D	17	1	—		0	0	17	1
Milan Futuro	Total		44	1	—		2	0	46	1
Career total			116	5	—		3	0	119	5
