= Filippo Terracciano =

Italian footballer

Personal information
- Full name: Filippo Terracciano
- Date of birth: 8 February 2003 (age 23)
- Place of birth: Verona, Italy
- Height: 1.86 m (6 ft 1 in)
- Positions: Defender; midfielder

Team information
- Current team: AC Milan
- Number: 42

Youth career
- 2019–2022: Hellas Verona

Senior career*
Years	Team	Apps	(Gls)
2021–2024	Hellas Verona	39	(0)
2024–	AC Milan	18	(0)
2025–2026	→ Cremonese (loan)	36	(2)

International career^{‡}
2021	Italy U18	1	(0)
2021–2022	Italy U19	7	(0)
2022–2024	Italy U20	9	(1)
2022	Italy U21	1	(0)
- * Club domestic league appearances and goals as of 22:51, 8 November 2026 (UTC) ‡ National team caps and goals as of 21 November 2023

Filippo Terracciano (born 8 February 2003) is an Italian professional footballer who plays as a defender and midfielder for Serie A club AC Milan. He is a former Italian youth international.

Known for his tactical versatility and near ambidexterity, Terracciano can play in many positions of most common modern formations, such as a full-back or a wing-back on either side of the pitch, centre-back, a central, defensive or box-to-box midfielder, and occasionally a winger.

== Club career ==
=== Hellas Verona ===
Terracciano made his professional debut for Hellas Verona on the 15 December 2021 against Empoli in Coppa Italia. He made his Serie A debut against Empoli on 20 March 2022.

=== AC Milan ===
On 8 January 2024, Terracciano joined fellow Serie A club AC Milan for a reported fee of €4.5 million, plus €1.5 million in add-ons, and a 10% sell-on clause on a future sale; he signed a contract until 30 June 2028 with the club.

According to the club's senior team head coach Stefano Pioli, Terracciano had been signed to play as a full-back.

==== Loan to Cremonese ====
On 11 August 2025, Terracciano joined recently Serie A promoted club Cremonese, on a one-year loan for the 2025–26 season, with an obligation to buy if the club avoids relegation at the end of the season. He quickly settled in, breaking into the team's starting XI as a right center back in the back-three of the 3–5–2 formation. He finished the season with 36 league appearances and 2 goals scored; his transfer to Cremonese had long been a settled issue before the club's relegation on the last matchday of the season, which now made the buyout clause optional. As the club decided against it, Terracciano returned to Milan.

== Career statistics ==
As of match played 8 November 2026

Appearances and goals by club, season and competition
Club	Season	League			Coppa Italia		Europe		Other		Total	
Club	Season	Division	Apps	Goals	Apps	Goals	Apps	Goals	Apps	Goals	Apps	Goals
Hellas Verona	2021–22	Serie A	1	0	1	0	—		—		2	0
Hellas Verona	2022–23	Serie A	20	0	0	0	—		—		20	0
Hellas Verona	2023–24	Serie A	18	0	1	0	—		—		19	0
Hellas Verona	Total		39	0	2	0	0	0	0	0	41	0
AC Milan	2023–24	Serie A	3	0	1	0	2 (Note: Appearances in UEFA Europa League)	0	—		6	0
AC Milan	2024–25	Serie A	13	0	1	0	2 (Note: Appearances in UEFA Champions League)	0	1 (Note: Appearance in Supercoppa Italiana)	0	17	0
AC Milan	2026–27	Serie A	2	0	0	0	3	0	—		5	0
AC Milan	Total		18	0	2	0	7	0	1	0	28	0
Cremonese (loan)	2025–26	Serie A	36	2	1	0	—		—		37	2
Career total			93	2	5	0	7	0	1	0	106	2

== Honours ==
AC Milan

- Supercoppa Italiana: 2024–25
