= AC Renate =

Italian football club

Renate
- Full name: Associazione Calcio Renate Srl
- Nicknames: Nerazzurri (the black and blues), Pantere (Panthers)
- Founded: 1947; 79 years ago 1955; 71 years ago
- Ground: Stadio Città di Meda
- Capacity: 3,000
- Chairman: Luigi Spreafico
- Manager: Simone Banchieri
- League: Serie C Group A
- 2025–26: Serie C Group A, 3rd of 20
- Website: www.acrenate.it
Home colours	Away colours

Associazione Calcio Renate is an Italian association football club based in Renate, Lombardy. It currently plays in Serie C.

The club plays their home games at the Stadio Città di Meda in Meda instead of their home field, Stadio Mario Riboldi in Renate, to comply with Lega Pro stadium criteria.

== History ==
The club was founded in 1947 as Unione Sportiva Renatese.

On 1961 the club has changed its name with Associazione Calcio Renate.

=== Lega Pro Seconda Divisione ===
On 4 August 2010, the club was admitted for the first time to the professional leagues despite finishing 5th in group B in the 2009–10 Serie D season in order to fill one of the sixteen vacancies available for the 2010-11 Lega Pro Seconda Divisione season following the bankruptcies and irregularities of other clubs. The team finished 5th their first season in Group A and a 2nd-place finish in 2013–14 ensured a spot in the inaugural unified Lega Pro division for 2014–15.

=== Serie C ===
The club has maintained their position in the third tier of the Italian football league system since 2014-15 and are currently competing in Group A of Serie C.

== Colours and badge ==
Its colours are blue and black.

== Current squad ==
As of 1 September 2026.

Note: Flags indicate national team as defined under FIFA eligibility rules; some limited exceptions apply. Players may hold more than one non-FIFA nationality.

No.	Pos.	Nation	Player
1	GK	ITA	Francesco Anacoura
2	DF	ITA	Riccardo De Zen
4	DF	ITA	Filippo Viganò
5	DF	ITA	Simone Auriletto
7	FW	CMR	Jonathan Italeng
8	MF	ITA	Salvatore Dore
9	FW	ISL	Óttar Magnús Karlsson
10	MF	ITA	Samuele Careccia
11	MF	ITA	Andrea Delcarro
12	GK	ITA	Andrea Bartoccioni
13	DF	MDA	Andrei Motoc
14	MF	ITA	Michele Calì
15	MF	URU	Martín Suárez (on loan from Reggiana)
17	MF	ITA	Andrea Bonetti
20	FW	ARG	Santiago Zalazar

No.	Pos.	Nation	Player
21	DF	ITA	Corrado Riviera
22	GK	ITA	Alessandro Rossi
23	DF	ITA	Luca Gobbo (on loan from Atalanta)
25	MF	ITA	Francesco Vassallo
29	DF	ITA	Tommaso Botrini
30	GK	ITA	Michele Avella
33	DF	ITA	Michele Tempre
47	MF	IRL	Liam Kerrigan
71	MF	ITA	Pasquale Ruiz Giraldo
61	GK	ITA	Riccardo Polo
72	MF	ITA	Gianluca Mastromonaco
73	DF	ITA	Gabriele Minotti
92	FW	ITA	Nicola Anelli
97	FW	SEN	Mbarick Fall

=== Out on loan ===
Note: Flags indicate national team as defined under FIFA eligibility rules; some limited exceptions apply. Players may hold more than one non-FIFA nationality.

No.	Pos.	Nation	Player
—	GK	ITA	Leonardo Rossi (at Gelbison until 30 June 2027)
—	DF	ITA	Pietro La Ruffa (at Caronnese until 30 June 2027)

No.	Pos.	Nation	Player
—	FW	ITA	Lorenzo De Leo (at Ligorna until 30 June 2027)

== Former players ==
- (Italy) Andrea Mira
