= Real Madrid CF =

Association football club in Spain

Real Madrid
- Full name: Real Madrid Club de Fútbol
- Nicknames: Los Blancos (The Whites); Los Merengues (The Meringues); Los Vikingos (The Vikings); La Casa Blanca (The White House); Reyes de Europa (Kings of Europe); Madridistas (supporters)
- Short name: RMA
- Founded: 6 March 1902; 124 years ago (as Madrid Football Club)
- Stadium: Bernabéu
- Capacity: 83,186
- Coordinates: 40°27′11.0″N 3°41′18.1″W
- President: Florentino Pérez
- Head coach: José Mourinho
- League: La Liga
- 2025–26: La Liga, 2nd of 20
- Website: realmadrid.com
Home colours	Away colours	Third colours

Real Madrid Club de Fútbol (Spanish pronunciation: [reˈal maˈðɾið ˈkluβ ðe ˈfuðβol]) is a Spanish professional association football club based in Madrid. The club competes in La Liga, the top tier of Spanish football.

Founded in 1902 as Madrid Football Club, the club has traditionally worn a white home kit. The honorific title 'Real' is Spanish for "Royal" and was bestowed by Alfonso XIII in 1920. Real Madrid have played their home matches in the Bernabéu since 1947. Unlike most European sporting clubs, Real Madrid's members have owned and operated the club throughout its history. The club is one of the most widely supported in the world and the most followed sports club across social media. It was estimated to be worth $6.6 billion in 2024, making it the world's most valuable football club. In 2024, it became the first football club to make €1 billion ($1.08bn) in revenue. The club anthem is the "Hala Madrid y nada más".

Real Madrid is one of the most successful football clubs in the world and the most decorated club in Europe. In Spanish domestic football, the club has won 71 trophies; a record 36 La Liga titles, 20 Copa del Rey, 13 Supercopa de España, a Copa Eva Duarte and a Copa de la Liga. In International football, Real Madrid have won a record 35 trophies: a record 15 European Cup/UEFA Champions League titles, a record six UEFA Super Cups, two UEFA Cups, a joint-record two Latin Cups, a record one Iberoamerican Cup, and a record nine world championships. (Note: Real Madrid have won five FIFA Club World Cup, three Intercontinental Cup and one FIFA Intercontinental Cup title for a total of nine. Additionally, Real Madrid won a one-off Ibero-American Cup (contested by Copa de Oro and Copa del Rey winners) in 1994.) Madrid has been ranked joint first a record number of times in the IFFHS Club World Ranking. In UEFA's club ranking, Madrid ranks first in the all-time club ranking.

As one of the three founding members of La Liga never relegated from the top division along with Barcelona and Athletic Bilbao, Real Madrid has many long-standing rivalries, most notably El Clásico with Barcelona and El Derbi Madrileño with Atlético Madrid. The club established itself as a major force in Spanish and European football during the 1950s and 60s, winning five consecutive and six overall European Cups. This success was replicated on the domestic front, with Madrid winning 12 league titles in 16 years. This team, which included Alfredo Di Stéfano, Ferenc Puskás, Paco Gento and Raymond Kopa, is considered by some in the sport to be the greatest of all time. Real Madrid is known for its Galácticos policy, which involves signing the world's best players, such as Ronaldo, Zinedine Zidane and David Beckham to create a superstar team. In 2009, Madrid signed Cristiano Ronaldo for a record-breaking £80 million (€94 million) from Manchester United; he became the club's and history's all-time top goal-scorer. In addition to signing star players, Real Madrid develops homegrown talent through its academy, La Fábrica, which has produced notable graduates such as Raúl, Iker Casillas, and Dani Carvajal, and has supplied the highest number of players to Europe's top five leagues.

Real Madrid was recognized as the greatest football club of the 20th century, receiving the FIFA Centennial Order of Merit in 2004. Real Madrid has the highest number of participations in the European Cup/UEFA Champions League (55), a tournament in which they hold the records for most wins, draws and goals scored. Real Madrid is the only club to have won three consecutive titles in the European Cup/UEFA Champions League twice, achieving this in 1956-58 and 2016-18. In 2024, they won a record-extending 15th Champions League title (the sixth in eleven seasons), recognized as such by Guinness World Records. Real Madrid is the first club across all Europe's top-five leagues to win 100 trophies in all competitions. As of May 2026, Real Madrid are ranked 2nd in UEFA club rankings, and first over 2013–23 coefficient.

== History ==
=== Early years (1902–1943) ===
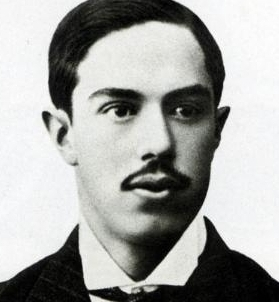
Julián Palacios, the first president of the club in 1900–1902

Real Madrid's origins go back to when football was introduced to Madrid by the academics and students of the Institución Libre de Enseñanza, which included several Cambridge and Oxford University graduates. They founded (Sociedad) Sky Football in 1897, commonly known as La Sociedad (The Society) as it was the only one based in Madrid, playing on Sunday mornings at Moncloa.

In 1900, conflict between members caused some of them to leave and create a new club, Nueva Sociedad de Football (New Society of Football), to distinguish themselves from Sky Football. Among the dissenters were Julián Palacios, recognized as the first Real Madrid president, Juan Padrós and Carlos Padrós, the latter two being brothers and future presidents of Real Madrid. In 1901, this new club was renamed as Madrid Football Club. Later, following a restructuring in 1902, Sky was renamed as "New Foot-Ball Club".

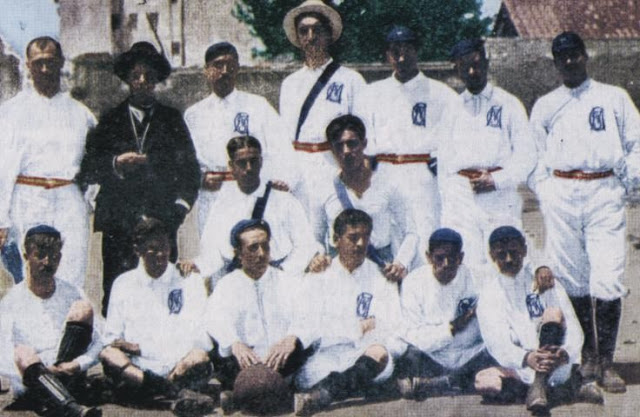
Madrid FC team in 1902

On 6 March 1902, after a new board presided by Juan Padrós had been elected, Madrid Football Club was officially founded. The Padrós brothers summoned other football enthusiasts to a meeting in the back room of Al Capricho, the family business. They viewed football as a mass sport that should be accessible to representatives of all social classes, and thought the new club should embody that idea. The brothers proposed the name, Madrid Football Club, which was unanimously accepted. The membership fee was also set, two pesetas a month, and the color of the shirt was chosen to be white in honour of a famous English team Corinthian, which Juan Padrós had met on one of his trips.

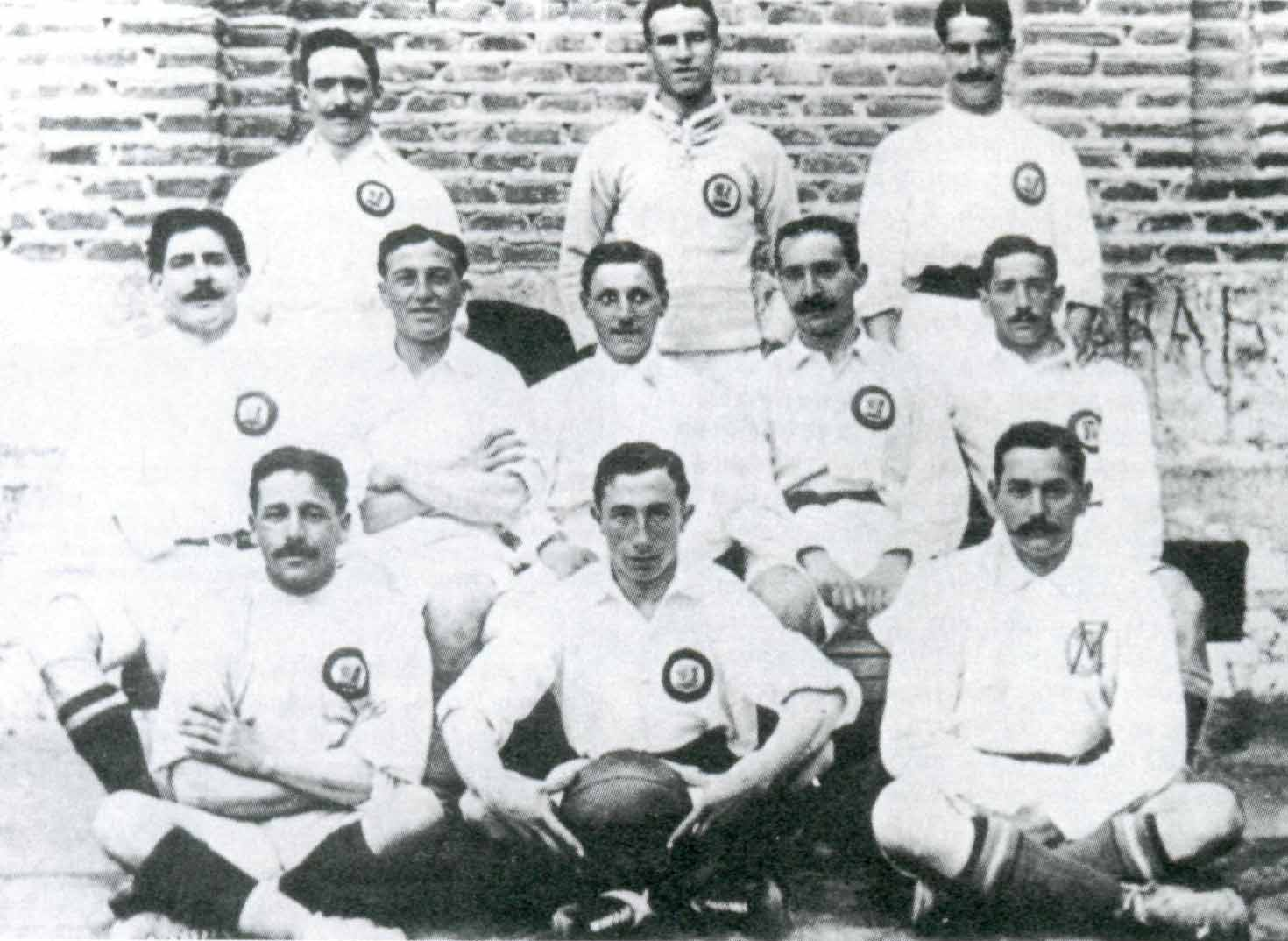
Madrid FC team in 1906

Three years after its founding, in 1905, Madrid FC won its first title after defeating Athletic Bilbao in the Spanish Cup final. The club became one of the founding sides of the Royal Spanish Football Federation on 4 January 1909, when club president Adolfo Meléndez signed the foundation agreement of the Spanish FA. After moving between several grounds, the team relocated to the Campo de O'Donnell in 1912. In 1920, the club's name was changed to Real Madrid after King Alfonso XIII granted the title of Real (Royal) to the club.

In 1929, the first Spanish football league was founded. Real Madrid led the first league season until the last match, a loss to Athletic Bilbao, meant they finished runners-up to Barcelona. Real Madrid won its first league title in the 1931–32 season and retained it the following year.

On 14 April 1931, the arrival of the Second Spanish Republic caused the club to lose the title Real and the royal crown on its emblem, going back to being named Madrid Football Club until the end of the Spanish Civil War. Football continued during the Second World War, and on 13 June 1943, Madrid beat Barcelona 11–1 in the second leg of the Copa del Generalísimo semi-finals, the Spanish Cup having been renamed in honour of General Franco. (Note: The Copa del Rey, as it was known for the most part of its history, was renamed to Copa del Presidente de la República by the Second Spanish Republic in 1932 and then to Copa del Generalísimo by the Francoist government in 1939.)

The first leg, played at the Les Corts in Catalonia, had ended with Barcelona winning 3–0. Madrid complained about all the three goals that referee Fombona Fernández had allowed for Barcelona, with the home supporters also whistling Madrid throughout, whom they accused of employing roughhouse tactics, and Fombona for allowing them to. The newspaper Ya reported the whistling as a "clear intention to attack the representatives of Spain". Barcelona fans were banned from traveling to Madrid. The day of the second leg, the Barcelona team were insulted and stones were thrown at their bus as soon as they left their hotel.

Barcelona's striker Mariano Gonzalvo said of the incident, "Five minutes before the game had started, our penalty area was already full of coins." Barcelona goalkeeper Luis Miró rarely approached his line—when he did, he was armed with stones. As Francisco Calvet told the story: "They were shouting: Reds! Separatists!... a bottle just missed Sospedra that would have killed him if it had hit him. It was all set up."

Real Madrid went 2–0 up within half an hour. The third goal brought with it a sending off for Barcelona's Benito García after he made what Calvet claimed was a "completely normal tackle". Madrid's José Llopis Corona recalled: "At which point, they got a bit demoralized", while Ángel Mur countered, "at which point, we thought: 'go on then, score as many as you want'". Madrid made it 8–0 by half-time; two goals were also ruled out for offside, and proceeded to score a further three goals in the second half, to which Barcelona replied with a late consolation goal.

According to football writer Sid Lowe: "There have been relatively few mentions of the game [since] and it is not a result that has been particularly celebrated in Madrid. Indeed, the 11–1 occupies a far more prominent place in Barcelona's history. This was the game that first formed the identification of Madrid as the team of the dictatorship and Barcelona as its victims." Fernando Argila, Barcelona's reserve goalkeeper from the 1943 match, said: "There was no rivalry. Not, at least, until that game."

=== Santiago Bernabéu and unprecedented success (1943–1978) ===
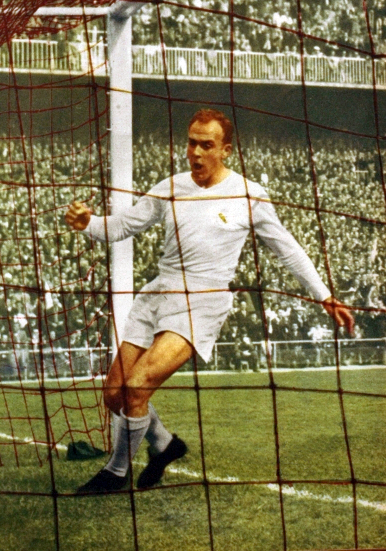
Alfredo Di Stéfano led the club to win five consecutive European Cups (currently the Champions League).

Santiago Bernabéu became president of Real Madrid in 1943. Under his presidency, the club was rebuilt after the Civil War, and he oversaw the construction of the club's current stadium, Estadio Real Madrid Club de Fútbol (now known as the Santiago Bernabéu), and its training facilities Ciudad Deportiva. Additionally, during the 1950s former Real Madrid Amateurs player Miguel Malbo founded Real Madrid's youth academy, or "cantera", known today as La Fábrica. Beginning in 1953, he embarked upon a strategy of signing world-class players from abroad, the most prominent being Alfredo Di Stéfano.

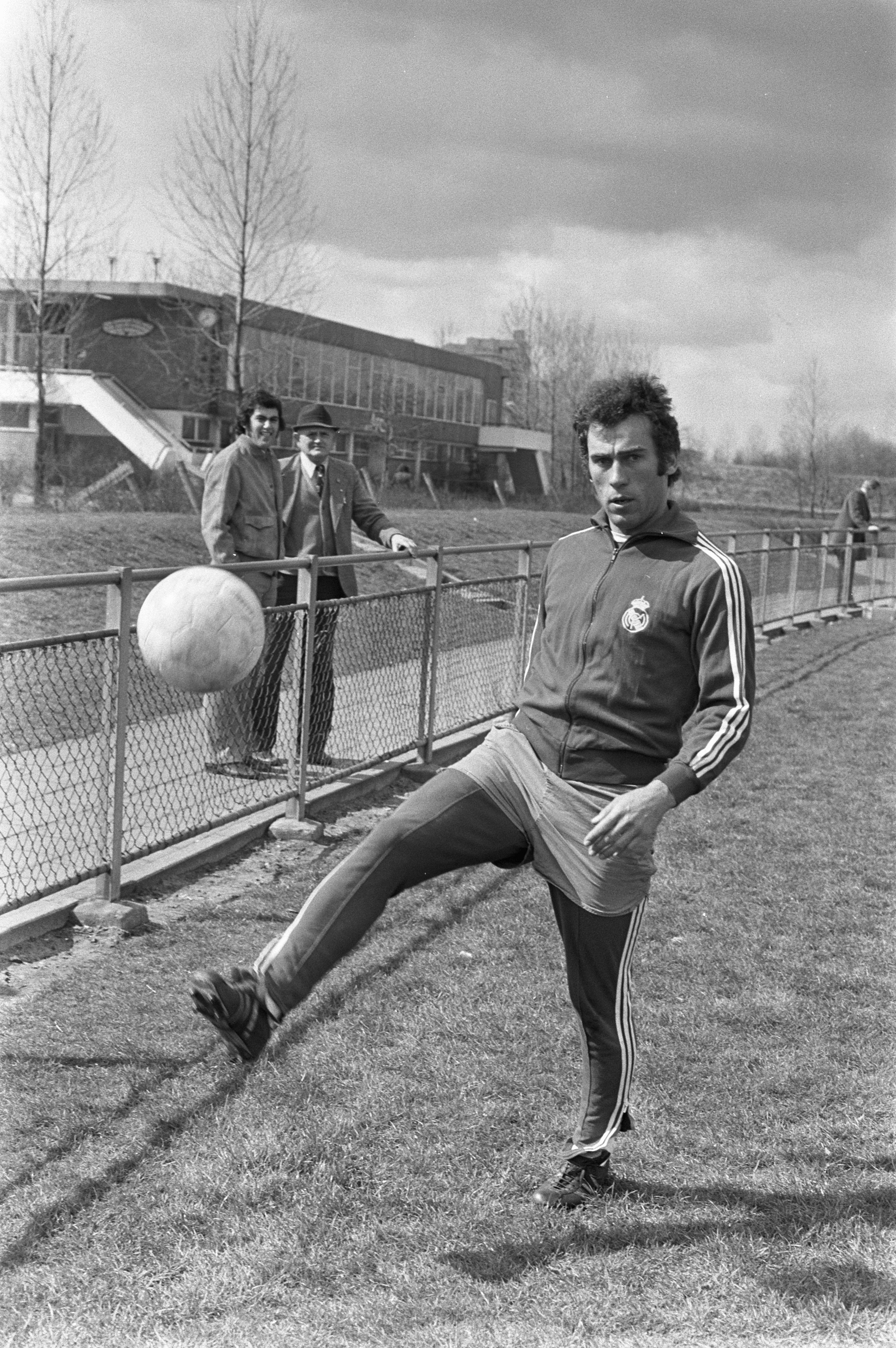
Amancio Amaro, captain of the Yé-yé team of the 1960s

In 1955, acting upon the idea proposed by Gabriel Hanot, a French sports journalist and editor of L'Équipe, Bernabéu, Ernest Bedrignan (deputy chairman of the Ligue de Football Professionnel) and Gusztáv Sebes created the European Cup, a continental tournament for the league champions around Europe, which is today known as the UEFA Champions League. It was under Bernabéu's guidance that Real Madrid established itself as a major force in both Spanish and European football. The club won the European Cup five times in a row between 1956 and 1960, which included the 7–3 Hampden Park final against Eintracht Frankfurt in 1960. After these five consecutive successes, Real was permanently awarded the original cup and earned the right to wear the UEFA badge of honour. Real Madrid's achievements in Europe were built upon its unprecedented domestic dominance, with the club winning twelve league titles out of sixteen possible from 1953–54 to 1968–69, including a five-in-a-row sequence in 1961–65, and finishing runners-up a further three times.

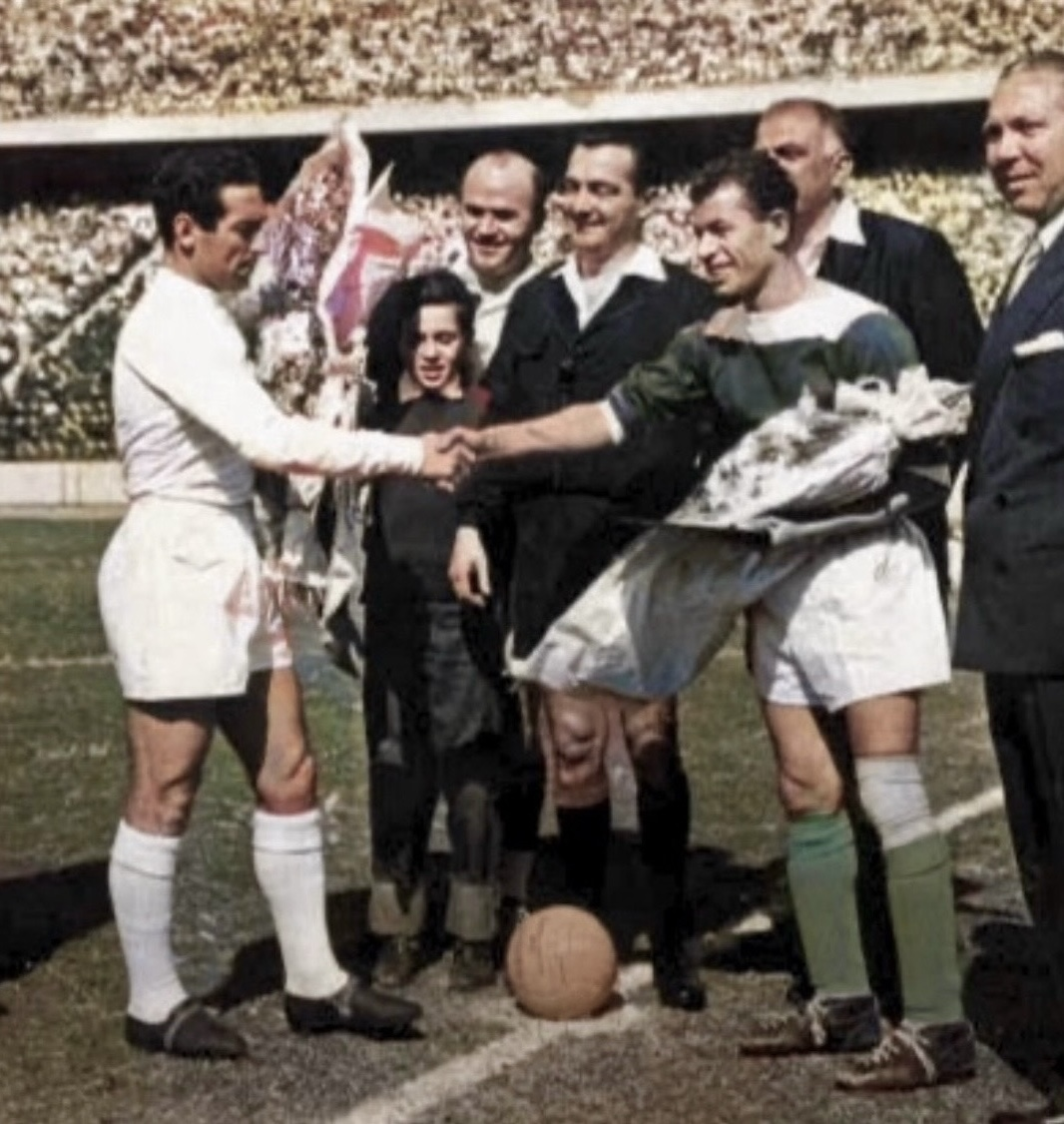
Real Madrid's captain Paco Gento shaking hands with Zamalek's captain Sharif El-Far before their friendly match on the occasion for celebrating 50 years on Zamalek's establishment in Cairo Stadium on 10 March 1961

The club won the European Cup for a sixth time in 1966, defeating Partizan Belgrade 2–1 in the final with a team composed entirely of same nationality players, a first in the competition. This team became known as the Yé-yé. The name "Yé-yé" came from the "Yeah, yeah, yeah" chorus in The Beatles' song "She Loves You" after four members of the team posed for Marca and impersonated the Beatles. The Yé-yé generation was also European Cup runners-up in 1962 and 1964. In the 1970s, Real Madrid won six league championships and three Spanish Cups. The club competed in its first European Cup Winners' Cup in 1970–71 and progressed all the way to the final, where it lost to English side Chelsea 2–1 in a replay. On 2 July 1978, club president Santiago Bernabéu died while the World Cup was being played in Argentina. FIFA decreed three days of mourning to honour him during the tournament. The following year, the club organized the first edition of the Trofeo Santiago Bernabéu in memory of its former president.

Bernabéu had been Real Madrid's president for almost 35 years, during which his club won one Intercontinental Cup, six European Cups, 16 league titles, six Spanish Cups, two Latin Cups and one Copa Eva Duarte.

=== Quinta del Buitre and sustained success (1980–2000) ===

In the early 1980s, Real Madrid had lost its grasp on the La Liga title, until a new cohort of home-grown stars brought domestic success back to the club. Spanish sports journalist Julio César Iglesias gave to this generation the name La Quinta del Buitre ("Vulture's Cohort"), which was derived from the nickname given to one of its members, Emilio Butragueño. The other four members were Manolo Sanchís, Martín Vázquez, Míchel and Miguel Pardeza. All five footballers were graduates of Real Madrid's youth academy. With La Quinta del Buitre (reduced to four members when Pardeza left for Zaragoza in 1986) and notable players like goalkeeper Francisco Buyo, right-back Miguel Porlán Chendo and Mexican striker Hugo Sánchez, Real Madrid had one of the best teams in Spain and Europe during the second half of the 1980s, winning two UEFA Cups, five Spanish championships in a row, one Spanish Cup, and three Spanish Super Cups. In the early 1990s, La Quinta del Buitre split up after Martín Vázquez, Emilio Butragueño and Míchel left the club.

In 1996, President Lorenzo Sanz appointed Fabio Capello as coach. Although his tenure lasted only one season, Real Madrid were proclaimed league champions, and players like Predrag Mijatović, Davor Šuker, Clarence Seedorf, Roberto Carlos and keeper Bodo Illgner arrived at the club to strengthen a squad that already boasted the likes of Raúl, Fernando Hierro and Fernando Redondo. As a result, Real Madrid (with the addition of Fernando Morientes in 1997) finally ended its 32-year wait for its seventh European Cup: in 1998, under manager Jupp Heynckes, they defeated Juventus 1–0 in the final with a goal from Mijatović.

In November 1999, Vicente del Bosque took over as coach. For the last season of the century, 1999–2000, the squad was still led by the older veterans such as Fernando Hierro, Fernando Redondo, Roberto Carlos and Raúl. Real added the budding young talents of Guti and Iker Casillas, supported by the arrival of Steve McManaman and Nicolas Anelka from the English Premier League, alongside local talents Míchel Salgado and Iván Helguera. In Del Bosque's first season in charge, Real won the Champions League for the eighth time, following a 3–0 victory over Valencia in the final, with goals from Morientes, McManaman and Raúl. This victory marked the beginning of a successful period in Real Madrid's history.

=== Florentino Pérez era (2000–2006) ===

In July 2000, Florentino Pérez was elected club president. He vowed in his campaign to erase the club's €270 million debt and modernize the club's facilities. However, the primary electoral promise that propelled Pérez to victory was the signing of Luís Figo from arch-rivals Barcelona. The following year, the club had its training ground rezoned and used the money to begin assembling the Galácticos team by signing a global star every summer, which included Zinedine Zidane, Ronaldo, Luís Figo, David Beckham and Fabio Cannavaro. It is debatable whether the gamble paid off, as despite winning the UEFA Champions League and an Intercontinental Cup in 2002, followed by La Liga in 2003, the club failed to win a major trophy for the next three seasons. Off the pitch, the Zidanes y Pavones policy resulted in increased financial success based on the exploitation of the club's high marketing potential around the world, particularly in Asia.

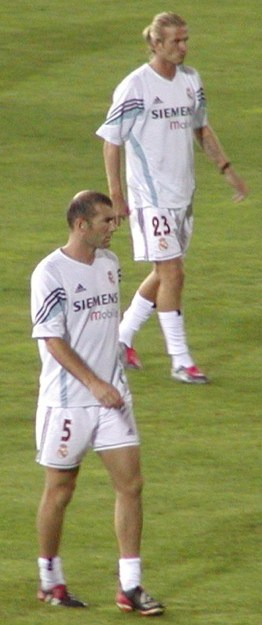
Beckham and Zidane were considered Galácticos.

The few days after the capturing of the 2003 La Liga title were surrounded with controversy. The first controversial decision came when Pérez sacked winning coach Vicente del Bosque. Over a dozen players left the club, including Madrid captain Fernando Hierro, while defensive midfielder Claude Makélélé refused to take part in training in protest at being one of the lowest-paid players at the club and subsequently moved to Chelsea. "That's a lot [of players leaving] when the normal rule is: never change a winning team", stated Zidane. Real Madrid, with newly appointed coach Carlos Queiroz, started their domestic league slowly after a hard win over Real Betis.

The 2005–06 season began with the promise of several new signings: Júlio Baptista (€24 million), Robinho (€30 million), and Sergio Ramos (€27 million). However, Real Madrid suffered from some poor results, including a 0–3 loss at the hands of Barcelona at the Santiago Bernabéu in November 2005. Madrid's coach Wanderley Luxemburgo was sacked the following month and his replacement was Juan Ramón López Caro. A brief return to form came to an abrupt halt after Madrid lost the first leg of the Copa del Rey semi-finals 6–1 to Real Zaragoza, a defeat that was nearly reversed with a 4–0 home victory. Shortly after, Real Madrid were eliminated from the Champions League for a fourth successive year, this time at the hands of Arsenal. On 27 February 2006, Florentino Pérez resigned.

=== Ramón Calderón era (2006–2009) ===
Ramón Calderón was elected as club president on 2 July 2006 and subsequently appointed Fabio Capello as the new coach and Predrag Mijatović as the new sporting director. Real Madrid won the Liga title in 2007 for the first time in four years, but Capello was nonetheless sacked at the end of the campaign. The title was won on 17 June, where Real faced Mallorca at the Bernabéu while Barcelona and Sevilla, the other title challengers, faced Gimnàstic de Tarragona and Villarreal, respectively. At half-time, Real were 0–1 down, while Barcelona had surged ahead into a 0–3 lead in Tarragona. However, three goals in the last half-hour secured Madrid a 3–1 win and their first league title since 2003. Real Madrid repeated as league winners in 2007–08, but the following season ended up being one of the most disastrous in the club's history: Real was knocked out of the Champions League at the round of 16 stage for the fifth time in a row, losing to Liverpool 0–5 on aggregate, and was embarrassed by Barcelona at the Santiago Bernabéu with a humiliating 2–6 loss, which all but confirmed the league title for Barça that went on to win the treble.

=== Second Florentino Pérez era (2009–present) ===
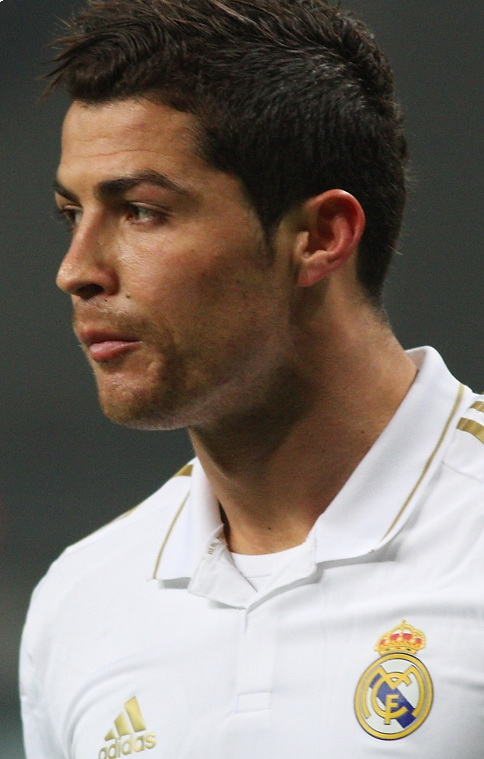
Cristiano Ronaldo was the club's most expensive signing when he joined in 2009, costing €94 million. He went on to become the club's all-time top scorer.

On 1 June 2009, Florentino Pérez regained Real Madrid's presidency amid the outrage over the club's decline. Pérez continued with the Galácticos policy pursued in his first term, buying Kaká from Milan for a record-breaking (in pounds sterling) sum of £56 million, and then breaking the record again by purchasing Cristiano Ronaldo from Manchester United for £80 million. Real Madrid spent in excess of €261 million in the summer of 2009, and the assembled team was soon dubbed the Second Galácticos. The 2009–10 season, however, was a transitional one as Madrid again finished second in the league, although this time amassing 96 points, the club's record at the time, and went out of the Champions League at the hands of Lyon. The season was marred by Cristiano Ronaldo's injury, that sidelined him for seven weeks, although he still topped the goalscoring charts with 33 goals, and Madrid became the highest scoring team in La Liga, with 102 goals. Real Madrid also had the misfortune to become the runners-up with the highest points total in the history of Europe's top five leagues, until surpassed by Liverpool's 97 points in 2018–19.

José Mourinho took over as manager in May 2010. In the 2010–11 season, the rebuilt Madrid successfully fought on all fronts, going toe to toe with a brilliant Barcelona side which some regard as the greatest team in football history. Ultimately, Madrid finished second in the league, with 92 points and four behind their perennial rivals, defeated them in the Copa del Rey final, and lost to Barça in the Champions League semi-finals, where Real progressed to for the first time since 2002–03. Moreover, from 16 April through 3 May, a rare occurrence happened when, for the first time ever, four Clásicos were to be played in a span of just 18 days. The first fixture was in the league campaign on 16 April (which ended 1–1 with penalty goals for both sides), the second one was in the Copa del Rey final (which was won by Madrid 1–0 a.e.t., bringing them their first trophy in the second Galáctico era) on 20 April and the third and fourth ones in the controversial two-legged Champions League semi-finals on 27 April and 3 May (Barcelona won on aggregate with a 2–0 away victory and a 1–1 home draw). Madrid again became the highest scoring team in La Liga, with 102 goals, repeating its output from the previous season, with Ronaldo scoring 40 and winning the European Golden Shoe.

In the 2011–12 season, Real Madrid won La Liga for a record 32nd time in its history, also finishing the season with numerous league records set, including 100 points amassed in a single season, a total of 121 goals scored, a goal difference of +89, 16 away games won, and 32 wins overall. They also competed in the UEFA Champions League for the 15th successive season, losing in the semi-finals to Bayern Munich in a penalty shoot-out after a 3–3 aggregate tie. Madrid entered the Copa del Rey as the defending champions, but lost 3–4 on aggregate in the quarter-finals to Barcelona. In the same season, Cristiano Ronaldo became the fastest player to reach 100 goals scored in Spanish league history. In reaching 101 goals in 92 games, Ronaldo surpassed Real Madrid legend Ferenc Puskás, who scored 100 goals in 105 matches. Ronaldo set a new club mark for individual goals scored in one year (60) and became the first player ever to score against all 19 opposition teams in a single season.

Real Madrid started the 2012–13 season by winning the Supercopa de España, defeating Barcelona on away goals. However, the super cup turned out to be their only trophy of the season, despite being close to win them all. Real finished runners-up to Barça in La Liga, accumulating 85 points, and reached the semi-finals of the UEFA Champions League for the third year in a row, where they were eliminated by Borussia Dortmund 3–4 on aggregate. Madrid also entered the Copa del Rey in the round of 32, going on a memorable run to the final, which saw them defeat Barcelona in the semi-finals before losing to Atlético Madrid 1–2 a.e.t. Real Madrid faced the Blaugrana six times throughout the season, coming away with three wins, two draws, and one loss. A major transfer of the season was the signing of Luka Modrić from Tottenham Hotspur for a fee in the region of £33 million. After a loss to Atlético in the Copa del Rey final, Pérez announced the departure of José Mourinho at the end of the season by "mutual agreement".

==== La Décima and Champions League dominance ====

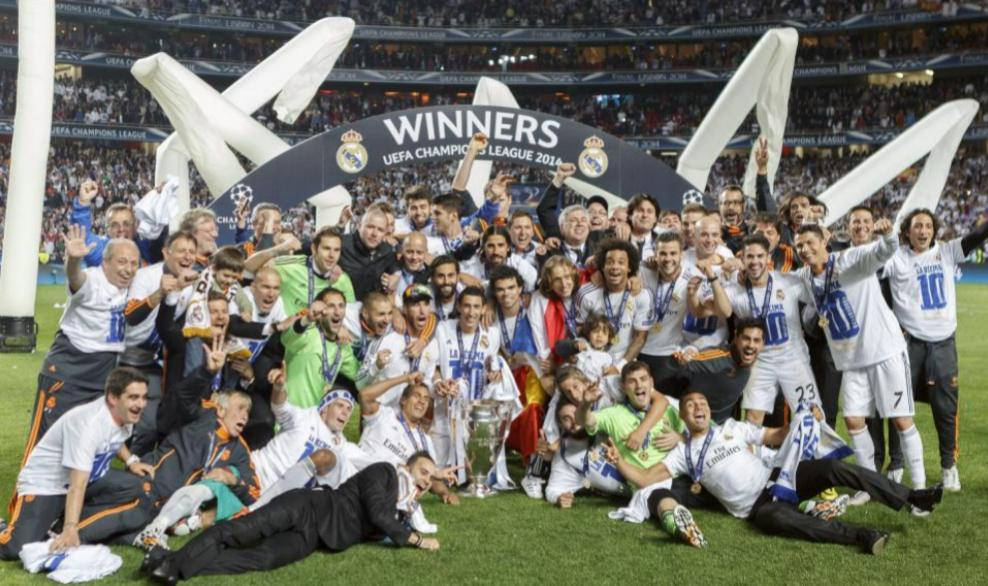
Real Madrid players celebrate the club's historic tenth European Cup / Champions League win (La Décima) in 2014.

On 25 June 2013, Carlo Ancelotti succeeded Mourinho to become the manager of Real Madrid on a three-year deal, with Zinedine Zidane named as one of his assistants. On 1 September 2013, the long-awaited transfer of Gareth Bale from Tottenham Hotspur was announced. The transfer of the Welshman was reportedly a new world record signing, with the transfer price approximated at €100 million. In Ancelotti's first season at the club, Real Madrid fought on all three fronts for the continental treble. Despite leading in the league campaign on multiple occasions, Madrid ultimately finished in third place (level on points with Barcelona and three behind cross-city rivals Atlético Madrid), collecting 87 points in total and scoring 104 goals. By that time, Los Blancos had already secured the Copa del Rey – against rivals Barcelona – in April, with Bale scoring the winner. The major breakthrough came in the UEFA Champions League, where Real returned to the final after twelve years, having beaten defending champions Bayern Munich 5–0 on aggregate in the semi-finals. In the final, they defeated then-recently-league winners Atlético Madrid 4–1 a.e.t. to clinch their tenth European Cup (first since 2002) and become the first team to win ten European Cups/Champions League titles, an achievement known as "La Décima" (Spanish: "The Tenth", [la ˈðeθima]). Real's attacking trio of Bale, Benzema and Cristiano, dubbed the BBC, finished the season with 97 goals.

After winning the 2014 Champions League, Real Madrid signed goalkeeper Keylor Navas, midfielder Toni Kroos and attacking midfielder James Rodríguez. In August, Madrid won the 2014 UEFA Super Cup against Sevilla, the club's 79th official trophy. During the last week of the 2014 summer transfer window, Real Madrid sold two players key to the previous season's successes: Xabi Alonso to Bayern Munich and Ángel Di María to Manchester United. This decision by the club was surrounded by controversy, with Cristiano Ronaldo stating, "If I was in charge, maybe I would have done things differently", while Carlo Ancelotti admitted, "We must start again from zero."

After a slow start to the 2014–15 season, Real Madrid went on a record-breaking 22-match winning streak, which included wins against Barcelona and Liverpool, surpassing the previous Spanish record of 18 successive wins set by Frank Rijkaard's Barça in the 2005–06 season. In late December, Real Madrid won their first Club World Cup, defeating San Lorenzo 2–0 in the final. The winning streak came to an end in their opening match of 2015 with a loss to Valencia, leaving the club two short of equalling the world record of 24 consecutive wins. Madrid was in contention for both the La Liga title and the UEFA Champions League until the end but ultimately came up short, finishing with 92 points in the league, two behind treble-winning Barcelona and losing to Juventus 2–3 on aggregate in the Champions League semi-finals. Ronaldo finished the season scoring 48 league goals, winning his fourth European Golden Shoe, and 61 goals in all competitions, breaking his record from 2011 to 2012. Overall, despite playing an attractive attacking football and being the highest scoring team in Europe with 118 league goals, several narrow defeats meant that Real finished the season with two trophies out of six possible, which contributed to the dismissal of Carlo Ancelotti on 25 May 2015.

On 3 June 2015, Rafael Benítez was confirmed as the new Real Madrid manager for the 2015–16 season, signing a three-year contract. Real Madrid remained unbeaten in the league until a 3–2 loss at Sevilla on the matchday 11. This was followed by a 0–4 home loss in the first Clásico of the season against Barcelona. Perhaps, his reign is best remembered by multiple lopsided wins achieved both in La Liga and the Champions League (6–0 vs Espanyol, 8–0 vs Malmö, 10–2 vs Rayo Vallecano and others). In the Copa del Rey round of 32, Real accidentally fielded an ineligible player in a 3–1 first leg win at Cádiz and was disqualified from the tournament two days later by the competition judge, despite protests from president Pérez. In the meantime, Madrid comfortably topped their UCL group with 16 points and a +16 goal difference. Benítez was relieved of his duties on 4 January 2016 following allegations of unpopularity with supporters, displeasure with players and a failure to produce good results against top teams. Benítez's departure was announced along with the promotion of Zinedine Zidane to his first head coaching role. Under Zidane, Madrid managed to turn the odds in its favour, ultimately winning the Champions League, something no one expected. The notable results include a 2–1 away victory over reigning treble winners Barcelona, who were on a record-breaking winning streak, a fantastic comeback against Wolfsburg in the Champions League quarter-finals (after losing the away game 0–2, Madrid erased the deficit and won 3–0 at home, courtesy of a Cristiano Ronaldo hat-trick), as well as a 12-game winning streak to conclude the league campaign, meaning Real finished second, with 90 points and just one point behind champions Barcelona, coming agonizingly close to clinching the title and overcoming a 12-point deficit in the process. Finally, on 28 May, Real Madrid's eleventh Champions League title was won thanks to a 5–3 penalty shoot-out victory over rivals Atlético Madrid after a 1–1 draw in the final, with the achievement being termed "La Undécima".

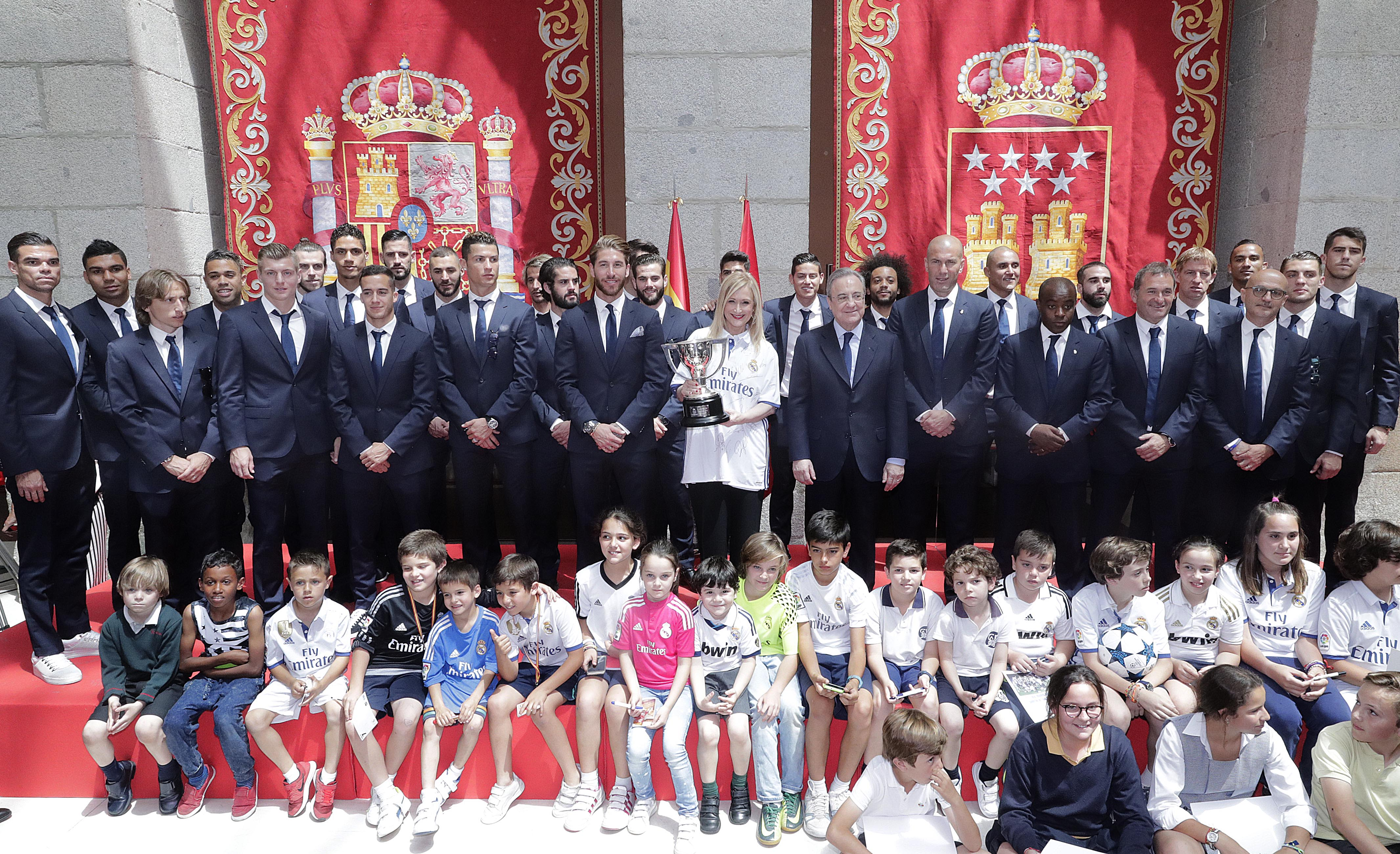
2016–17 La Liga champions Real Madrid celebrate the title with Community of Madrid President Cristina Cifuentes.

Real Madrid began their 2016–17 campaign, which was to be Zidane's first full season in charge of the club, with a victory in the 2016 UEFA Super Cup against Sevilla. On 10 December 2016, Madrid played their 35th-straight match without a loss, which set a new club record. On 18 December 2016, the club defeated Japanese outfit Kashima Antlers 4–2 in the final of the 2016 FIFA Club World Cup. With a 3–3 draw at Sevilla in the second leg of the Copa del Rey round of 16 on 12 January 2017, Madrid progressed to the quarter-finals with a 6–3 aggregate victory and extended its unbeaten run to 40 matches, breaking Barcelona's Spanish record of 39 matches unbeaten in all competitions from the previous season. Their unbeaten streak ended after a 1–2 away loss against the same opposition in La Liga three days later. The team then was knocked out of the Copa del Rey by Celta Vigo 3–4 on aggregate. These slips, however, did not affect the overall trajectory of the season. In May, Madrid won the league title for a record 33rd time, their first title in five years, accumulating 93 points in the process. On 3 June 2017, the club's victory over Juventus in the Champions League final resulted in Real Madrid becoming the first team to successfully defend their title in the UEFA Champions League era, and the first to win consecutive titles in the competition since Milan in 1989 and 1990, when the tournament was known as the European Cup. Real Madrid's title was its 12th, extending the record, and its third in four years. The achievement is also known as "La Duodécima". The 2016–17 season was the greatest campaign in terms of trophies won (four out of possible five) in the history of Real Madrid, an achievement that would be later equalled in the 2017–18 season.

Real kicked off the 2017–18 campaign by winning its second consecutive and fourth overall UEFA Super Cup in a 2–1 victory against Manchester United. Five days later, Real Madrid beat Barcelona at the Camp Nou 3–1 in the first leg of the 2017 Supercopa de España and then defeated Barça 2–0 in the return leg, ending their 24 consecutive match scoring record in El Clásico matches and winning the second trophy of the season. On 16 December 2017, Real beat Brazilian club Grêmio 1–0 in the FIFA Club World Cup final and became the first team to retain the trophy. In the 2017–18 UEFA Champions League, Madrid once again progressed to the final where they defeated Liverpool 3–1 to become the first club to win three straight titles in the Champions League era, as well as the first team to win three consecutive titles in the European Cup/Champions League since Bayern Munich in 1976. The trophy also marked Madrid's fourth win in five years and their eighth consecutive semi-finals appearance. On 31 May, only five days after winning the final, Zidane announced his resignation as Real Madrid manager, citing the club's "need for change" as his rationale for departing. Zidane's and Ronaldo's departures marked the end of the Second Galáctico Era that yielded four Champions League titles, two La Liga titles, two Copa del Rey, two Supercopa de España, three UEFA Super Cups, and three FIFA Club World Cup titles. The team was instrumental in ending Barcelona's dominance, despite the Blaugrana boasting arguably the greatest collection of talent in history, and overshadowed the Catalans on the European stage. Real Madrid was also somewhat notoriously unlucky in its league campaigns throughout these nine years, finishing runners-up with 96, 92 (twice) and 90 points, as well as on 87 points in third place, just three off the league winners.

==== Following Ronaldo's departure ====
Chart of Real Madrid's league performance 1929–2025

On 12 June 2018, Real Madrid named Julen Lopetegui, the head coach of the Spanish national team, as their new manager. It was announced that he would officially begin his managerial duties after the 2018 FIFA World Cup. However, the Spanish national team sacked Lopetegui a day prior to the tournament, stating that he had negotiated terms with the club without informing them. The club then began re-shaping the squad in the summer of 2018, which included the sale of Cristiano Ronaldo to Juventus for a reported €117 million. Madrid began their 2018–19 campaign by losing to Atlético Madrid 2–4 a.e.t. in the 2018 UEFA Super Cup. After a 1–5 loss to Barcelona in El Clásico on 28 October which left Real Madrid in the ninth place with only 14 points after ten games, Lopetegui was dismissed a day later and replaced by then Castilla coach, Santiago Solari. On 22 December 2018, Real Madrid beat Al Ain 4–1 in the FIFA Club World Cup and became the outright record winners of the Club World Cup with four titles. However, they were then knocked out of the Copa del Rey at the semi-final stage by Barcelona, losing 1–4 on aggregate. On 5 March 2019, Real was defeated by Ajax 1–4 (3–5 on aggregate) at home, crashing out of the Champions League at the round of 16 stage after eight consecutive semi-finals appearances. On 11 March 2019, Real Madrid dismissed Solari and reinstated Zidane as the head coach of the club. Madrid finished the season with 68 points and a +17 goal difference, its lowest totals since 2001–02 and 1999–2000 respectively.

In the summer of 2019, Madrid signed Eden Hazard, Luka Jović, Éder Militão, Ferland Mendy, Rodrygo, Reinier and other players for a total of more than €350 million. On 12 January 2020, Madrid beat cross-city rivals Atlético Madrid in a penalty shootout in the Supercopa de España final to win their eleventh title. After a three-month hiatus due to the COVID-19 outbreak in March 2020, La Liga was restarted in June and Madrid won ten games in a row to capture the team's 34th league title, collecting 87 points in total. From the competition's resumption in June and until the end of the 2020–21 season, Real temporarily played home fixtures at the Alfredo Di Stéfano Stadium, while the Santiago Bernabéu underwent extensive renovations.

==== Further domestic success and La Decimocuarta ====
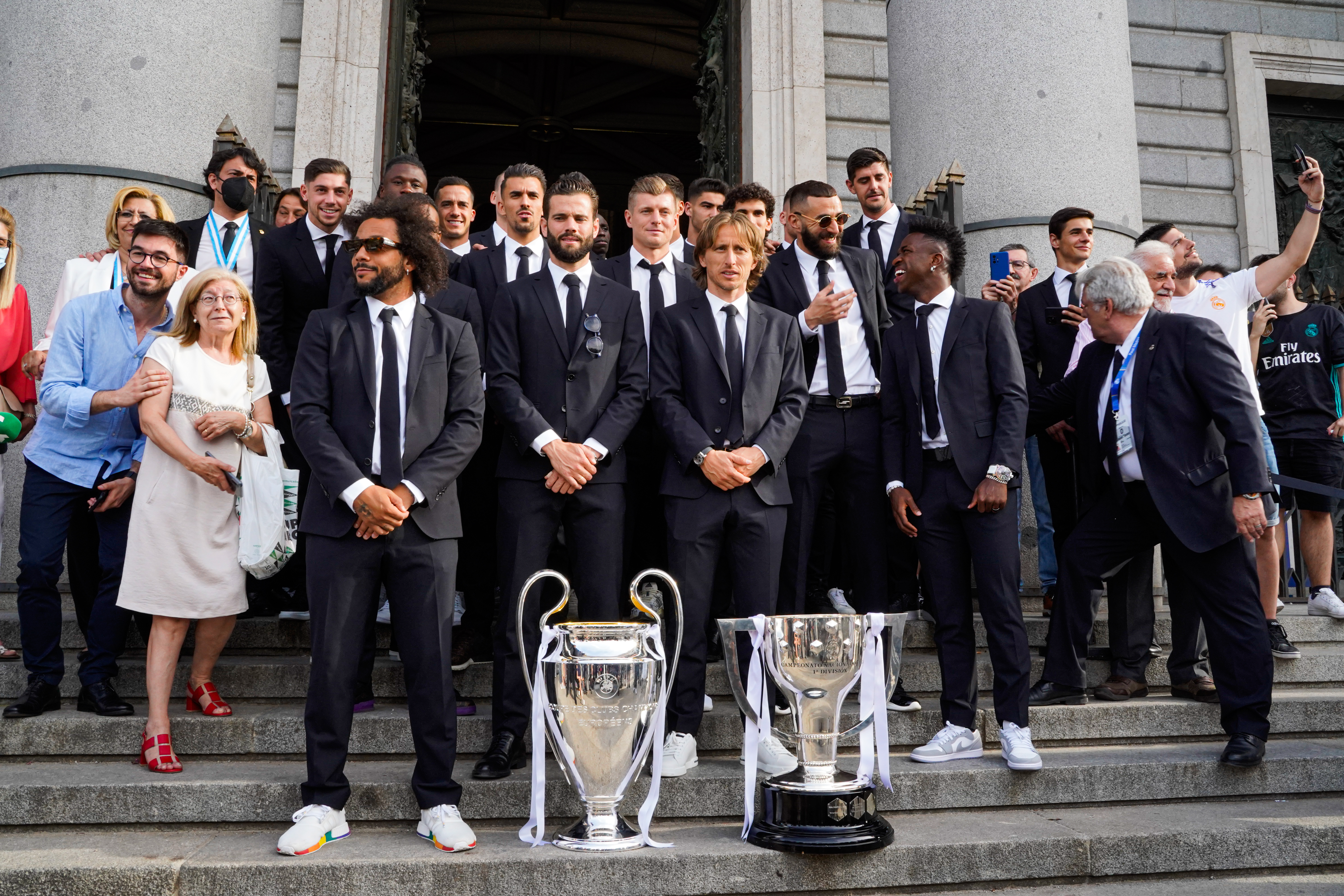
Real Madrid players celebrating the double on 29 May 2022, the day after their Champions League victory

Zidane left a second time on 27 May 2021 after going trophyless that season, with Carlo Ancelotti returning to coach the team for the 2021–22 season. On the domestic front, he delivered two trophies out of possible three, winning La Liga and the Supercopa de España. As such, Ancelotti won all six available top trophies at Madrid. In the Champions League, Madrid produced one of the most memorable runs of all time, defeating pre-tournament favourites Paris Saint-Germain, defending champions and favourites Chelsea, Premier League champions and heavy favourites Manchester City, all in dramatic fashion, and setting up the final against Liverpool, who were once again widely considered as favourites, in a rematch of their 2018 encounter. A lone Vinícius Júnior goal sealed the 14th European Cup for Los Blancos, their fifth in nine years, and Ancelotti's second in charge. Real also claimed their fourth ever European double (after 1956–57, 1957–58, and 2016–17). Despite Real's status as the most decorated team in the history of the Champions League, they were not favoured to win that year's edition, and their improbable run was widely considered a surprise.

==== Even more success and La Decimoquinta ====
After a highly successful 2021–22 season, Real Madrid signed German defender Antonio Rüdiger and French midfielder Aurélien Tchouaméni, while club legends Marcelo, Isco, Gareth Bale and Casemiro left the club. Real Madrid's 2022–23 season began with lifting the UEFA Super Cup and later the FIFA Club World Cup. The season ended with Real Madrid winning the 2022–23 Copa del Rey, but losing the La Liga and Spanish Super Cup to Barcelona and the Champions League to Manchester City, being defeated 5–1 on aggregate.

In 2023, Real Madrid signed Jude Bellingham, who was given the number #5 jersey, previously used by Zinedine Zidane. Real also signed Arda Güler and Fran García. Meanwhile, Vinícius Júnior was given the number #7 jersey, previously used by Raúl and Cristiano Ronaldo; while Rodrygo was given the number #11 jersey, previously used by Gareth Bale. Karim Benzema left the club, while Toni Kroos would later announce that he would retire from football after the season.

The 2023–24 season would prove to be another highly successful season for Los Blancos. First, Real Madrid lifted the Spanish Super Cup against Barcelona 4–1, taking revenge of the previous year's 3–0 defeat. Then, Real Madrid lifted the La Liga with relative ease, reaching 95 points, the second-best winning campaign by Real Madrid in La Liga history after the 2011–12 100 points season. In the 2023–24 UEFA Champions League, Real Madrid knocked out RB Leipzig in the Round of 16, then defending champions Manchester City in penalties.

In the semifinals, Real Madrid faced Bayern Munich again. The first match was a 2–2 draw, while the second match in the Bernabéu was marked by a double by Joselu in the last few minutes of the game, with Bayern Munich suffering a historic comeback after leading 1–0. Real Madrid faced Borussia Dortmund in the final, and won 2–0, with Dani Carvajal being the man of the match and scoring with a header after a Toni Kroos corner, and Vinícius Júnior once again scoring in a UCL final. Real Madrid won their 15th Champions League without losing a single match during the campaign.

==== Mbappé era and decline ====
Following the conclusion of the 2023–24 season, Real Madrid announced that striker Kylian Mbappé would be joining the club on a free transfer from Paris Saint-Germain in July 2024, concluding one of the most highly anticipated transfer sagas in modern history. On 18 December 2024, Real Madrid clinched their second trophy of the season, uplifting the inaugural 2024 FIFA Intercontinental Cup by beating Pachuca 3–0.

Despite high expectations, Madrid endured a disappointing 2024–25 season, finishing as runners-up in all 3 domestic competitions to Barcelona. They suffered a 5–2 defeat to Barça in the 2025 Supercopa de España final and were edged out 3–2 after extra time in the 2024-25 Copa del Rey final. The season also saw a humbling Champions League quarter-final exit, as Real Madrid were eliminated by Arsenal 5–1 on aggregate.

Following these setbacks, Real Madrid announced that Carlo Ancelotti would depart as manager at the end of the season. Across his two spells as a manager, he won 15 titles, making him the most successful manager in the club's history. To improve the squad, Real Madrid secured two significant signings ahead of the 2025 FIFA Club World Cup: English full-back Trent Alexander-Arnold from Liverpool and Spanish centre-back Dean Huijsen from Bournemouth.

On 25 May 2025, former player and Bayer Leverkusen manager Xabi Alonso was appointed as Real Madrid manager on a three-year contract. The 2025 FIFA Club World Cup marked his professional managerial debut, with Real Madrid drawing 1–1 against Al-Hilal before suffering a 4–0 defeat to Paris Saint-Germain in the semi-final. After the Club World Cup, Madrid finalized the signings of two other players: Álvaro Carreras from Benfica and Franco Mastantuono from River Plate, registering the latter as a Castilla player. On 12 January 2026, Alonso and Real Madrid mutually parted ways one day after a 3–2 loss to Barcelona in the Supercopa de España final. Former player and Castilla manager Álvaro Arbeloa was officially announced as head coach on 13 January 2026, just one day after the Supercopa loss. His first match in charge was a 3–2 loss to Albacete in the Copa del Rey on 14 January, which resulted in an early exit from the domestic cup. Real Madrid eliminated Manchester City in a 5–1 aggregate victory in the 2025–26 UEFA Champions League Round of 16, but later got eliminated by Bayern Munich 6–4 on aggregate. Under Arbeloa, the team experienced a mixed run in La Liga, widening the points gap between themselves and first-place Barcelona.

On 7 May 2026, just three days before the El Clásico, a fight broke out between Valverde and his teammate, Aurélien Tchouaméni. Following the fight, Valverde required stitches because he suffered a cut that needed to be addressed medically. Valverde was found unconscious on the floor with blood all over him and suffering from partial amnesia after hitting his head. Subsequent to the altercation, Real Madrid initiated a disciplinary investigation. The process culminated in both players extending mutual apologies to each other. As a result, the club imposed a fine of €500 thousand on each player and formally concluded the internal inquiry.

On 10 May 2026, Real Madrid suffered a decisive 2–0 defeat that officially saw Barcelona secure the La Liga title for the 29th time at the newly refurbished Spotify Camp Nou.

== Crests and colours ==
=== Crests ===
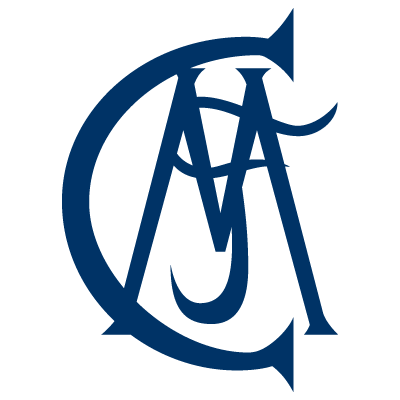
1902

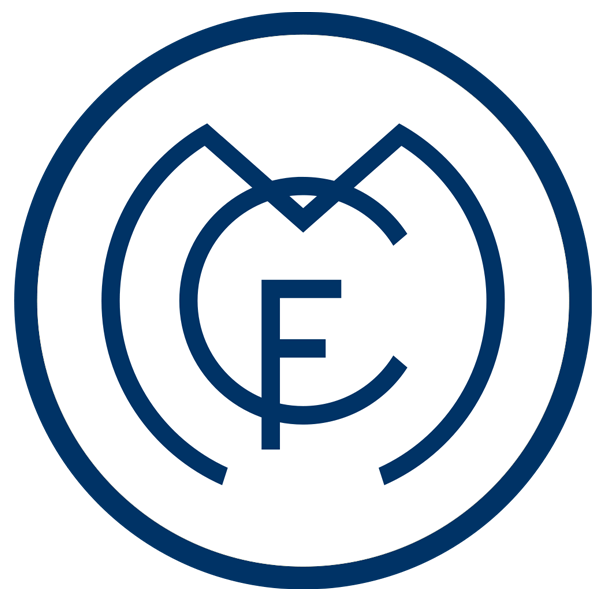
1908

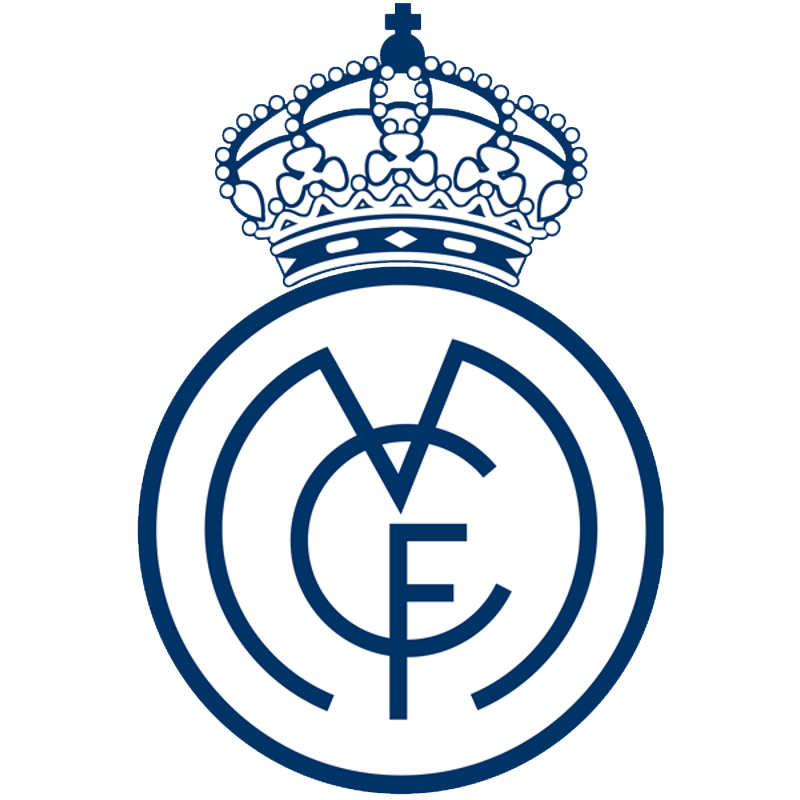
1920

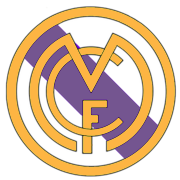
1931

2001

The first crest had a simple design consisting of a decorative interlacing of the three initials of the club, "MCF" for Madrid Club de Fútbol, in dark blue on a white shirt. The first change in the crest occurred in 1908 when the letters adopted a more streamlined form and appeared inside a circle. The next change in the configuration of the crest did not occur until the presidency of Pedro Parages in 1920. At that time, King Alfonso XIII granted the club his royal patronage which came in the form of the title "Real Madrid", meaning "Royal". Thus, Alfonso's crown was added to the crest and the club styled itself Real Madrid Club de Fútbol.

With the dissolution of the monarchy in 1931, all royal symbols (the crown on the crest and the title of Real) were eliminated. The crown was replaced by the dark mulberry band of the Region of Castile. In 1941, two years after Nationalist victory in the Civil War, the Francoist regime restored the crest's "Real Corona", or "Royal Crown", while the mulberry stripe of Castile was retained as well. In addition, the whole crest was made full color, with gold being the most prominent, and the club went back to its honorific name Real Madrid Club de Fútbol. The most recent modification to the crest occurred in 2001 when the club wanted to better situate itself for the 21st century and further standardize its crest. One of the modifications made was changing the mulberry stripe to a more bluish shade.

=== Colours ===
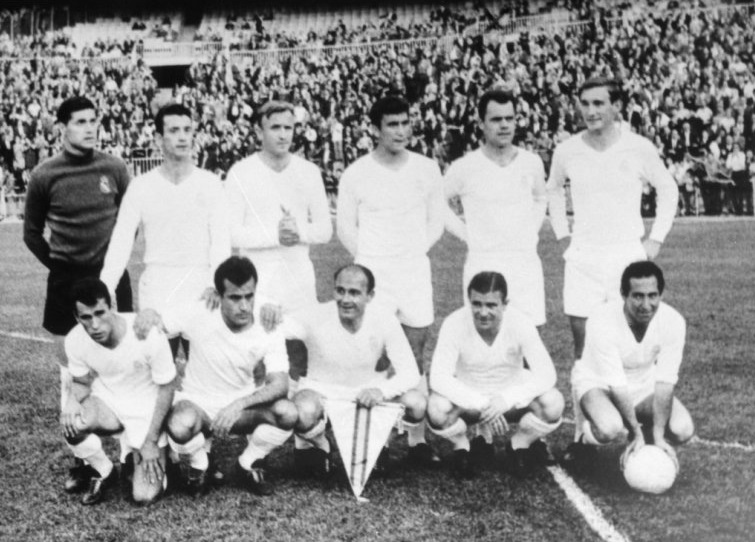
Real Madrid in 1964. Nicknamed Los Blancos (The Whites), the club has worn an all-white home kit except for one season in 1925.

Real Madrid has maintained the white shirt for its home kit throughout the history of the club. There was, however, one season in 1926 that the shirt and shorts were not both white. It was an initiative undertaken by Juan Padrós in honour of an English team Corinthian, which he had met on one of his trips, one of the most famous teams at the time known for its elegance and sportsmanship. It was decided that Real Madrid would wear black shorts in an attempt to replicate the English team, which had also inspired Madrid's original white kit, but the initiative lasted just one year. After being eliminated from the 1926 Copa del Rey by Barcelona with a 1–5 defeat in Madrid and a 2–0 defeat in Catalonia, President Parages decided to return to an all-white kit, claiming that the other kit brought bad luck. (Note: Real Madrid home kit in 1905 was all-white, so the supporters began referring to the players as Los Blancos.) By the early 1940s, the manager changed the kit again by adding buttons to the shirt and the club's crest on the left breast, which has remained ever since. On 23 November 1947, in a game against Atlético Madrid at the Metropolitano Stadium, Real Madrid became the first Spanish team to wear numbered shirts. English club Leeds United permanently switched their blue shirt for a white one in the 1960s, to emulate the dominant Real Madrid of the era.

Real's traditional away colours are all blue or all purple. Since the advent of the replica kit market, the club has also released various other one colour designs, including red, green, orange and black. The club's kit is manufactured by Adidas, whose contract extends from 1998. Real Madrid's first shirt sponsor, Zanussi, agreed for the 1982–83, 1983–84 and 1984–85 seasons. Following that, the club was sponsored by Parmalat and Otaysa before a long-term deal was signed with Teka in 1992. In 2001, Real Madrid ended their contract with Teka and for one season and used the Realmadrid.com logo to promote the club's website. Then, in 2002, a deal was signed with Siemens and in 2006, the BenQ Siemens logo appeared on the club's shirt. Real Madrid's shirt sponsor from 2007 until 2013 was bwin.com following the economic problems of BenQ Siemens. Fly Emirates became their shirt sponsor in 2013, and in 2017 the club renewed the sponsorship with the airliner, signing a deal until 2022 worth €70 million per year. In 2022, the agreement was again extended, until 2026. In 2015, Madrid signed a new ten-year contract with Adidas, believed to be worth a total of £850 million (€1 billion), with the club earning £59 million (€64 million) per season. The contract includes a clause sanctioning penalty or agreement termination anytime, if Real Madrid fails to qualify for the European competitions or is relegated from La Liga.

==== Kit suppliers and shirt sponsors ====
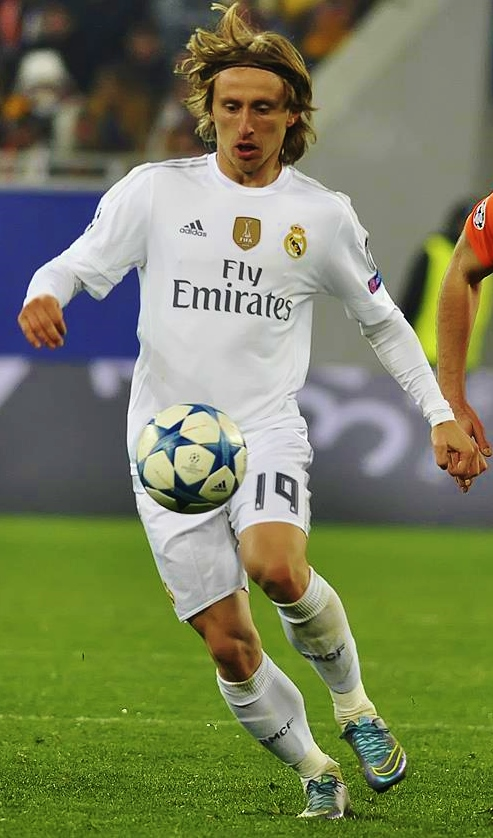
Real Madrid's jersey (worn by Luka Modrić in 2015) is manufactured by Adidas, with Emirates the shirt sponsor.

Period	Kit manufacturer	Shirt sponsor	Sleeve sponsor
1981–1982	Adidas	—	—
1982–1985	Adidas	Zanussi	—
1985–1989	Hummel	Parmalat	—
1989–1991	Hummel	Reny Picot	—
1991–1992	Hummel	Otaysa	—
1992–1994	Hummel	Teka	—
1994–1998	Kelme	Teka	—
1998–2001	Adidas	Teka	—
2001–2002	Adidas	Realmadrid.com (Note: Realmadrid.com appeared as shirt sponsor to promote the club's new website.)	—
2002–2005	Adidas	Siemens mobile	—
2005–2006	Adidas	Siemens	—
2006–2007	Adidas	BenQ-Siemens	—
2007–2013	Adidas	bwin	—
2013–2024	Adidas	Emirates	—
2024–	Adidas	Emirates	HP

==== Kit deal ====
Kit supplier	Period	Contract announcement	Contract duration	Value	Notes
Adidas	1998–present	Undisclosed	2015–2020 (6 years)	Total €1 billion	
Adidas	1998–present	8 May 2019	2020–2028 (8 years)	Total €1.1 billion	

Note: early termination clauses can be activated at any time depending on the team's performance.

== Stadium ==
Bernabéu
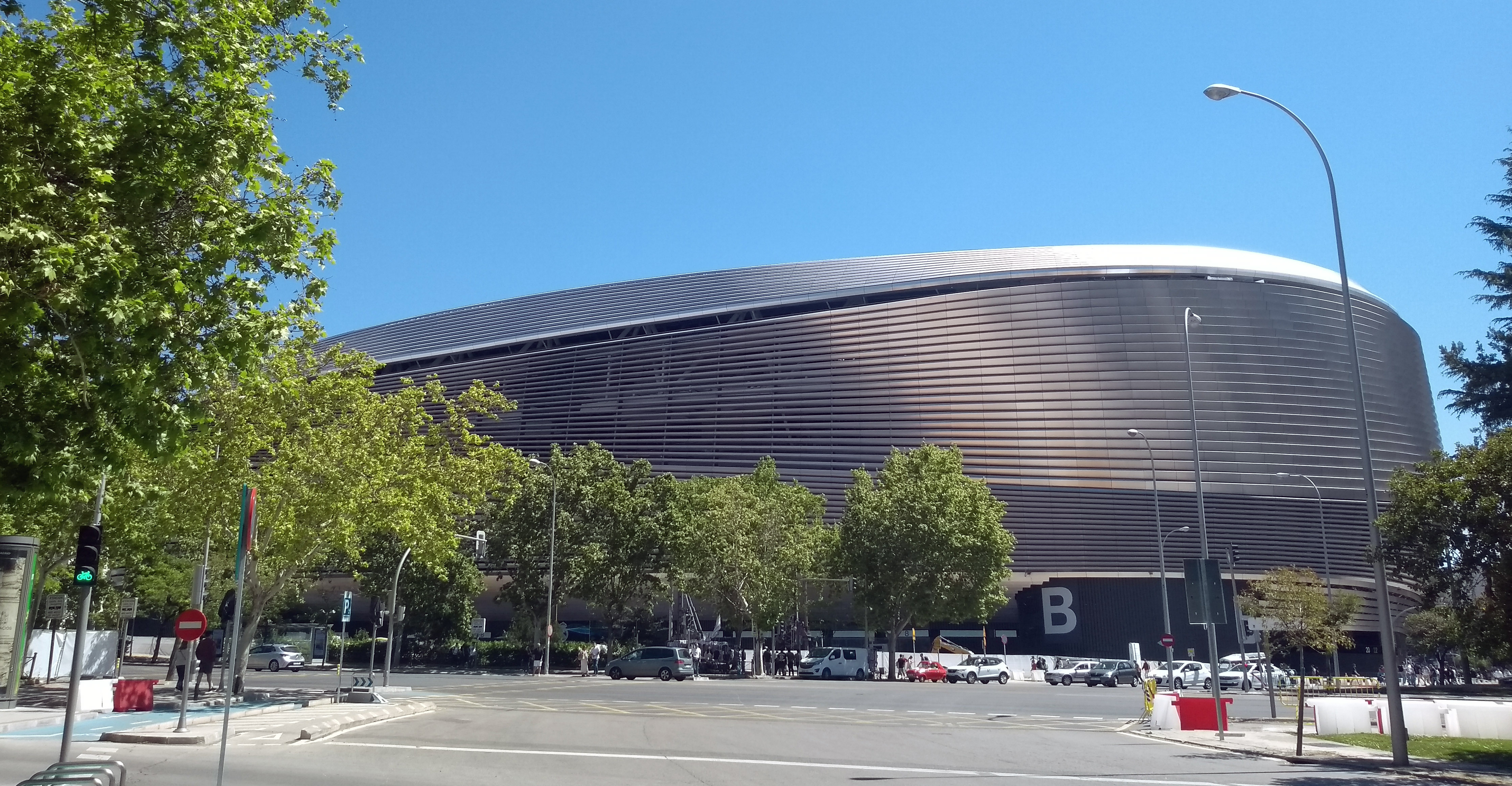
- Capacity: 85,000
- Field size: 107 m × 72 m (351 ft × 236 ft)

Construction
- Groundbreaking: 27 October 1944
- Opened: 14 December 1947
- Architects: Manuel Muñoz Monasterio, Luis Alemany Soler, Antonio Lamela

After moving between several grounds, the team relocated to the Campo de O'Donnell in 1912, which remained its home stadium for 11 years. After this period, the club moved for one year to the Campo de Ciudad Lineal, a small ground with a capacity of 8,000 spectators. After that, Real Madrid started playing its home matches at the Estadio Chamartín, which was inaugurated on 17 May 1923 with a match against Newcastle United. In this stadium, which hosted 22,500 spectators, Real Madrid celebrated its first Spanish league title. Following his election in 1943, president Santiago Bernabéu decided that the Chamartín was not big enough for the ambitions of the club, and thus a new stadium was built and inaugurated on 14 December 1947. Initially known as Nuevo Chamartín, the stadium was renamed in honour of Bernabéu in 1955 and continues to bear his name to this day. The first match at the Bernabéu was played between Madrid and the Portuguese club Belenenses, with Los Blancos winning 3–1 and Sabino Barinaga scoring the first goal.

The capacity has changed frequently, peaking at 120,000 after a 1953 expansion. Since then, there have been a number of reductions due to modernizations (the last standing areas were removed in 1998–99 in response to UEFA regulations which had forbidden standing at matches in European competitions), countered to some extent by expansions. The current capacity of the ground is 81,044. Real Madrid has the fourth-highest average attendance in Europe, behind Borussia Dortmund, Barcelona and Manchester United.

The Bernabéu has hosted the 1964 UEFA European Championship final, the 1982 FIFA World Cup final, and the 1957, 1969, 1980 and 2010 European Cup/Champions League finals. The stadium has its own namesake Madrid Metro station along the 10 line. On 14 November 2007, the Bernabéu was upgraded to Elite Football Stadium status by UEFA.

On 9 May 2006, the Alfredo Di Stéfano Stadium, named after club legend Alfredo Di Stéfano, was inaugurated in the Real Madrid City, where Real Madrid usually trains. The inaugural match was played between Real Madrid and Reims, a rematch of the 1956 European Cup final. Real Madrid 6–1, with goals from Sergio Ramos, Antonio Cassano (2), Roberto Soldado (2) and José Manuel Jurado. The venue is now part of the Ciudad Real Madrid, the club's training facility located outside Madrid, in Valdebebas. The stadium's capacity is 5,000 people, and it is Real Madrid Castilla's home ground. For the latter part of the 2019–20 season and throughout the 2020–21 season, the stadium hosted the first team's home games due to a combination of the COVID-19 pandemic-triggered restrictions and an extensive renovation of the Santiago Bernabéu.

The latest renovation of the Santiago Bernabéu is set to increase the capacity by approximately 4,000 with the addition of an extra tier, bringing it to nearly 85,000. Furthermore, the height will also be increased by ten metres and a retractable roof, a retractable pitch and a 360-degree screen will be installed. The works have started in 2019, and the renovated stadium was initially planned to be unveiled in 2022; however, the COVID-19 pandemic and Russian invasion of Ukraine caused significant disruption to supply chains, prompting the club to postpone the stadium's inauguration to 2023.

== Records and statistics ==
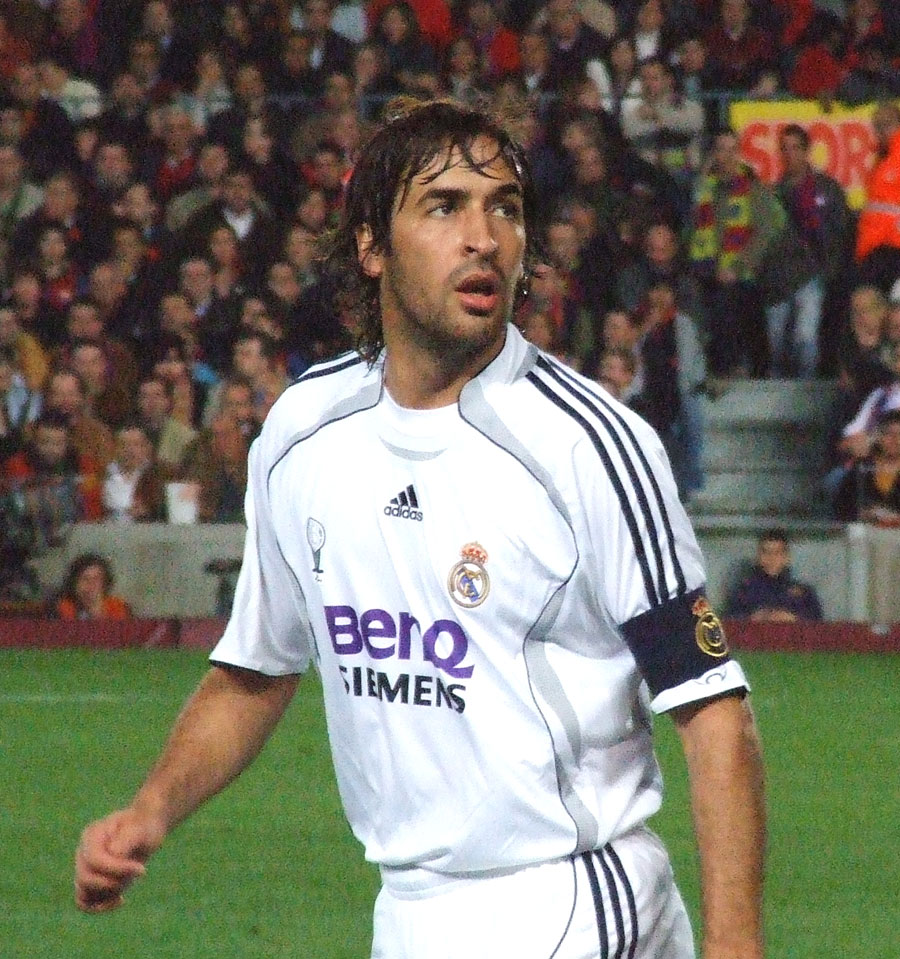
Raúl is Real Madrid's all-time leader in appearances.

Raúl holds the record for most appearances with Real Madrid, with 741 appearances from 1994 to 2010. Iker Casillas comes second with 725 appearances, followed by Manuel Sanchis Jr., having played 710 times. The record for a goalkeeper is held by Iker Casillas, with 725 appearances. With 63 goals, Cristiano Ronaldo has scored the most international goals while playing for the club. Meanwhile, Sergio Ramos has accumulated the most caps while playing for the club, with 176.

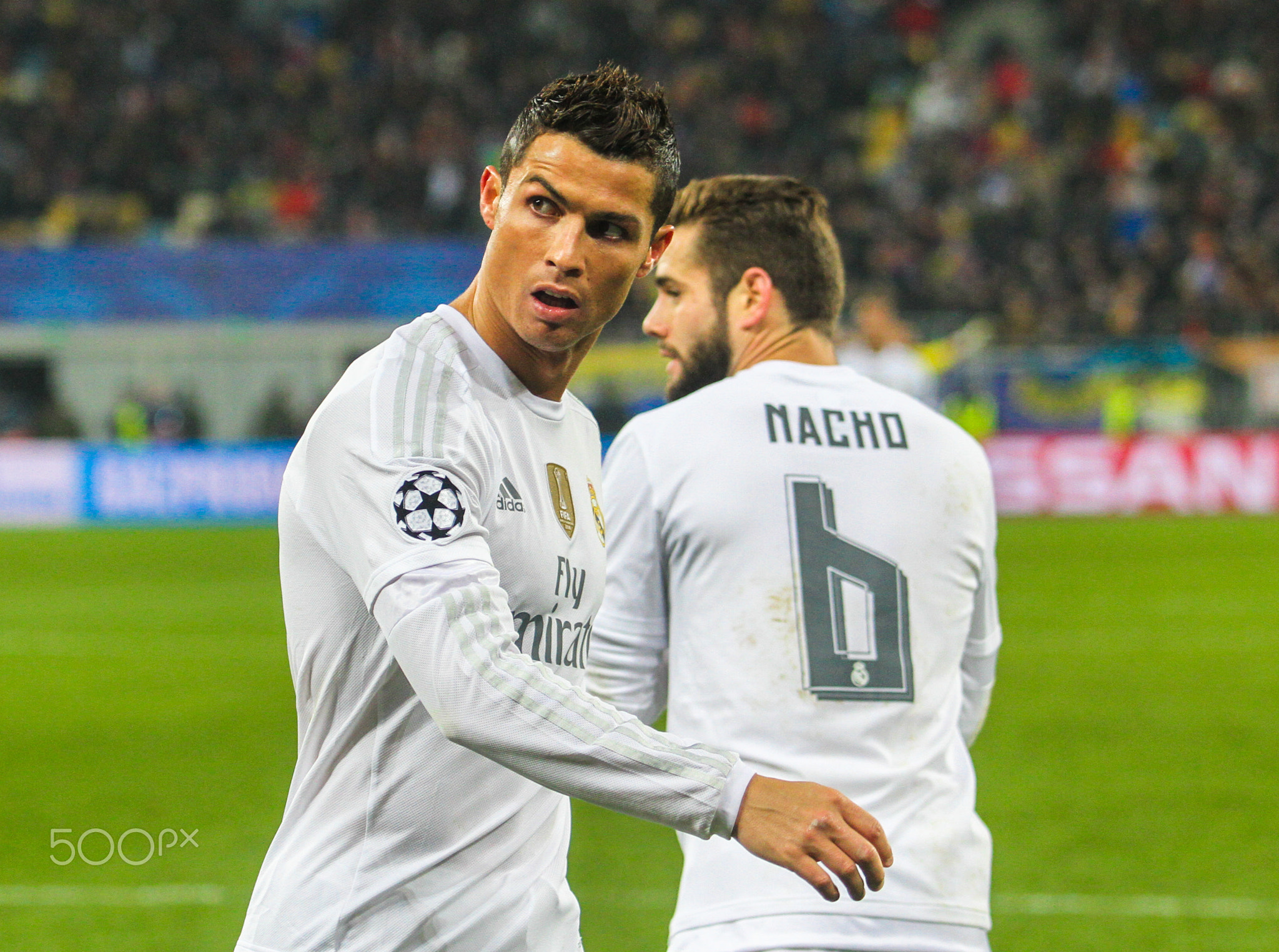
Cristiano Ronaldo is Real Madrid's record goalscorer and the first player ever to score against every team in a single La Liga season.

Cristiano Ronaldo (2009–2018) is Real Madrid's all-time top goalscorer, with 450 goals in 438 matches. Six other players have also scored over 200 goals for Real: Alfredo Di Stéfano (1953–1964), Santillana (1971–1988), Ferenc Puskás (1958–1966), Hugo Sánchez (1985–1992), Karim Benzema (2009–2023) and the previous goalscoring record-holder Raúl (1994–2010). Cristiano Ronaldo also holds the record for the most league goals scored in one season (48 in 2014–15), alongside being Real's top goalscorer of all time in La Liga history with 311 goals. Di Stéfano's 49 goals in 58 matches was for decades the all-time highest tally in the European Cup, until it was surpassed by Raúl in 2005, and is now held by Cristiano Ronaldo with 105 goals for Madrid and 140 overall. The fastest goal in the history of the club (13 seconds) was scored by the Chilean Iván Zamorano on 3 September 1994 during a league match against Sevilla.

Officially, the highest home attendance figure for a Real Madrid match is 129,690, which was for a European Cup match in 1956 against Milan. The current official capacity of the Santiago Bernabéu is 80,000. Real has also set records in Spanish football, most notably the most domestic titles (36 as of 2023–24) and the most seasons won in a row (five, during 1960–65 and 1985–90). With 121 matches (from 17 February 1957 to 7 March 1965), the club holds the record for longest unbeaten run at home in La Liga.

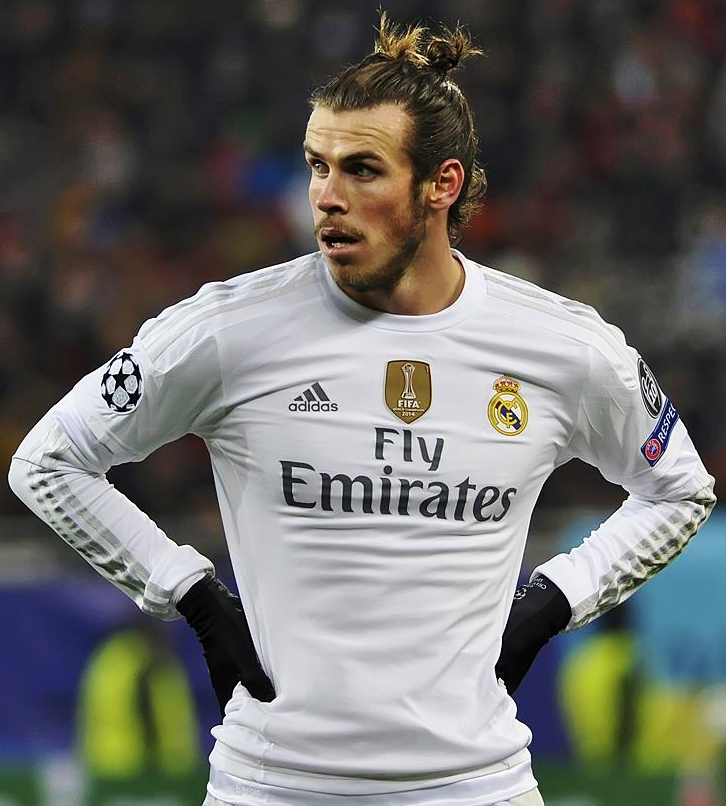
Gareth Bale is the club's joint record signing, costing €100 million in 2013.

The club also holds the record for winning the European Cup/UEFA Champions League fifteen times and for the most semi-finals appearances (33). As of June 2024, Cristiano Ronaldo is the all-time top scorer in the UEFA Champions League, with 140 (141 including qualifiers) goals in total, 105 while playing for Real Madrid. The team has the record number of consecutive participations in the European Cup (before it became the Champions League) with 15, from 1955–56 to 1969–70. Among the club's on-field records is a 22-game winning streak in all competitions during the 2014–15 season, a Spanish record. In September 2017, the club equalled the record of the Brazilian club Santos, starring Pelé, by scoring in their 73rd consecutive game, before Bayern Munich broke the record in 2021.

In June 2009, the club broke its own record for the highest transfer fee ever paid in the history of football after purchasing Manchester United star Cristiano Ronaldo for €94 million (£80 million). The fee of €77.5 million (100 billion lire) for Zinedine Zidane's transfer from Juventus to Real Madrid in 2001 was the previous highest transfer fee ever paid. This record (in pounds sterling) had been broken previously in June 2009, for a few days, when Real Madrid agreed to buy Kaká from Milan for €67 million (£65 million). The transfer of Tottenham Hotspur's Gareth Bale in 2013 was reportedly a new world record signing, with the transfer fee approximated at around €100 million. In January 2016, documents pertaining to Bale's transfer were leaked which confirmed a world record transfer fee of €100,759,418. Real Madrid equalled their record signing in 2019, when the club signed Eden Hazard from Chelsea for a reported €115 million. The club's record sale occurred on 10 July 2018, when Juventus signed Cristiano Ronaldo for €117 million.

== Support ==
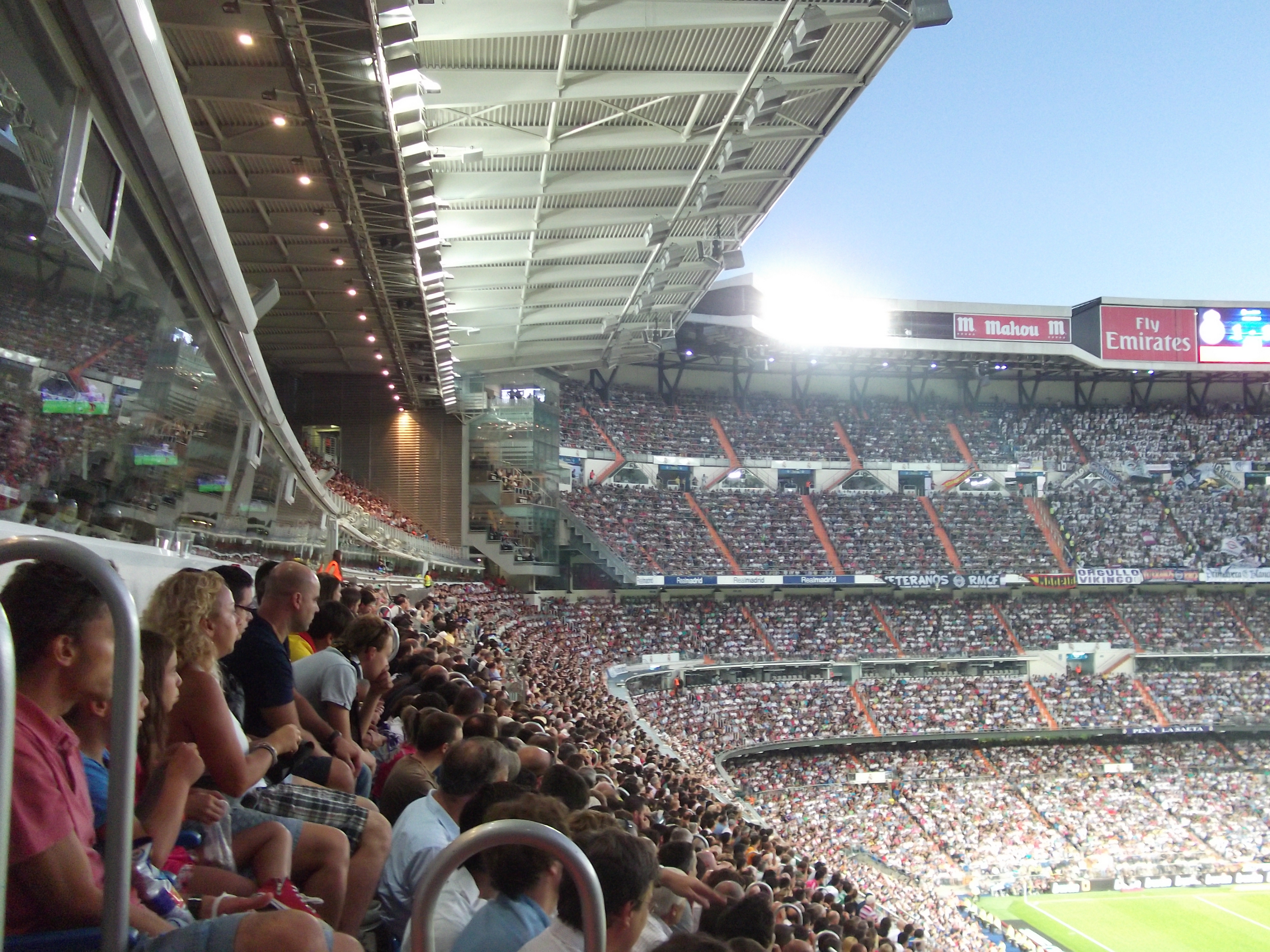
The number of season tickets at the Bernabéu is capped at 65,000, with the remaining seats made available to the general public.

During most home matches, the majority of the seats in the stadium are occupied by season-ticket holders, of which the figure is capped at 65,000. To become a season ticket holder, one must first be a socio, or club member. In addition to members, the club has more than 1,800 peñas (official, club-affiliated supporters' groups) in Spain and around the world. Real Madrid has the second highest average all-time attendance in Spanish football and regularly attracts over 74,000 fans to the Bernabéu. One of the best supported teams globally, Real Madrid was the first sports team (and first brand) to reach 100 million fans on Facebook in April 2017.

Real Madrid's hardcore supporters are the so-called Ultras Sur supporters, or simply Ultras. They are known for their extreme right-wing politics, akin to Barcelona's hardcore supporters group Boixos Nois. The Ultras Surs have developed an alliance with other right wing groups, most notably Lazio Irriducibili fans, and have also developed an alliance with left-wing groups. On several occasions, they have racially abused opposing players, and have been investigated by UEFA for doing so. Florentino Pérez took it upon himself to ban the Ultras from the Bernabéu and assign their seats to the general public. This decision was controversial with some of the Bernabéu faithful, however, as the lively atmosphere of games would suffer as a result. The Ultras have since held protests outside the Bernabéu and have demanded to be reinstated and allowed to enter the grounds.

Questioned over Pope Francis' adherence to 2014 FIFA Club World Cup Final opponents San Lorenzo, Madrid captain Sergio Ramos stated: "In the semi-finals, we noticed the love from supporters in Marrakesh and it seemed like we were playing at home. That sums up the greatness of this team. Madrid is God's team and the team of the world". Among the club's famous supporters is golfer Sergio García, who was invited to take the honorary kickoff for El Clásico at the Bernabeu wearing his green jacket from winning the 2017 Masters.

== Rivalries ==
=== El Clásico ===
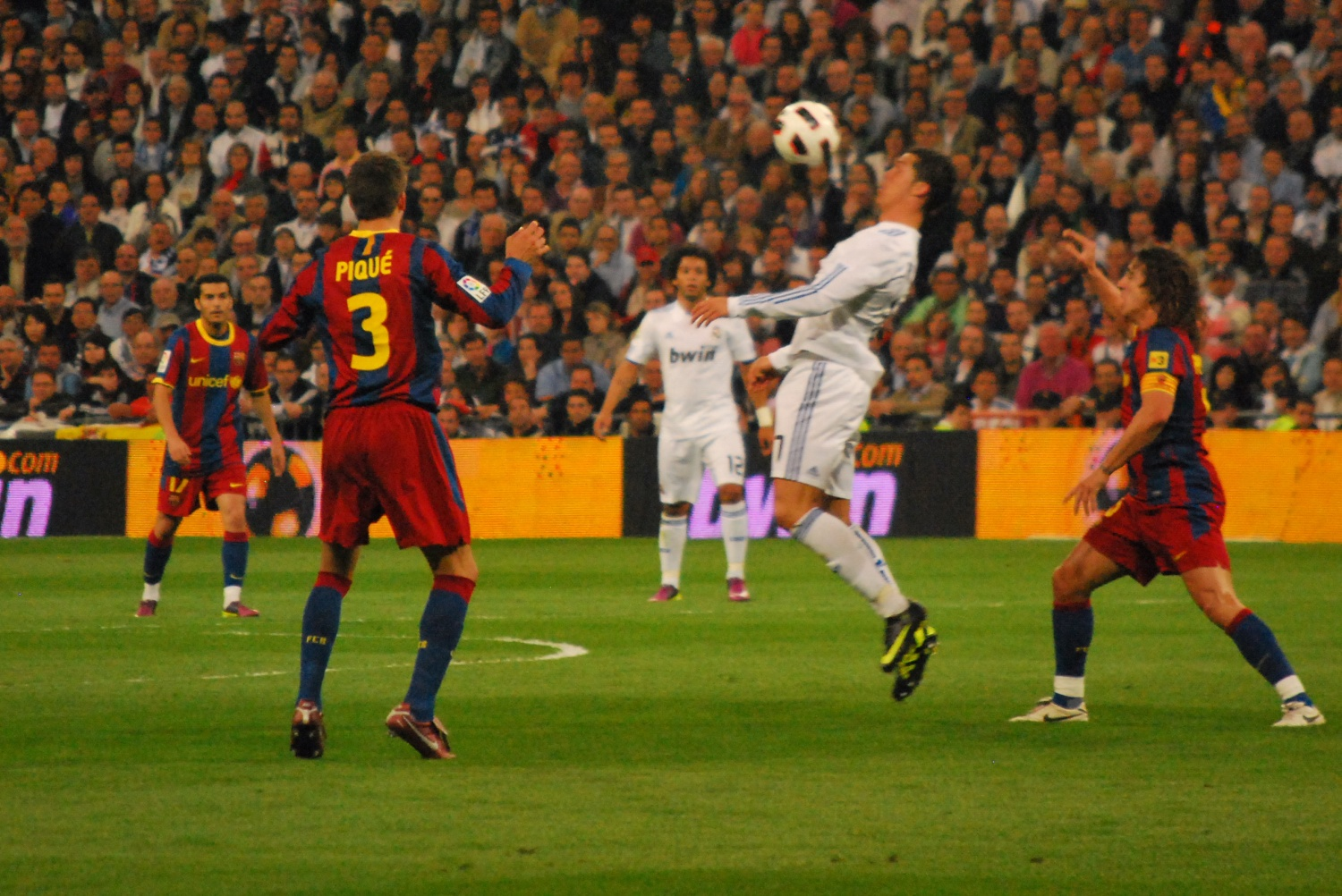
Scene from a 2011 El Clásico at the Santiago Bernabéu Stadium

There is often a fierce rivalry between the two strongest teams in a national league, and this is particularly the case in La Liga, where the game between Real Madrid and Barcelona is known as "The Classic" (El Clásico). From the start of national competitions the clubs were seen as representatives of two rival regions in Spain: Castile and Catalonia, as well as of the two cities. The rivalry reflects what many regard as the political and cultural tensions felt between the Castilians and Catalans, seen by one author as a re-enactment of the Spanish Civil War. Over the years, the record for Real Madrid and Barcelona is 105 victories for Madrid, 104 victories for Barcelona, and 52 draws as of June 2025.

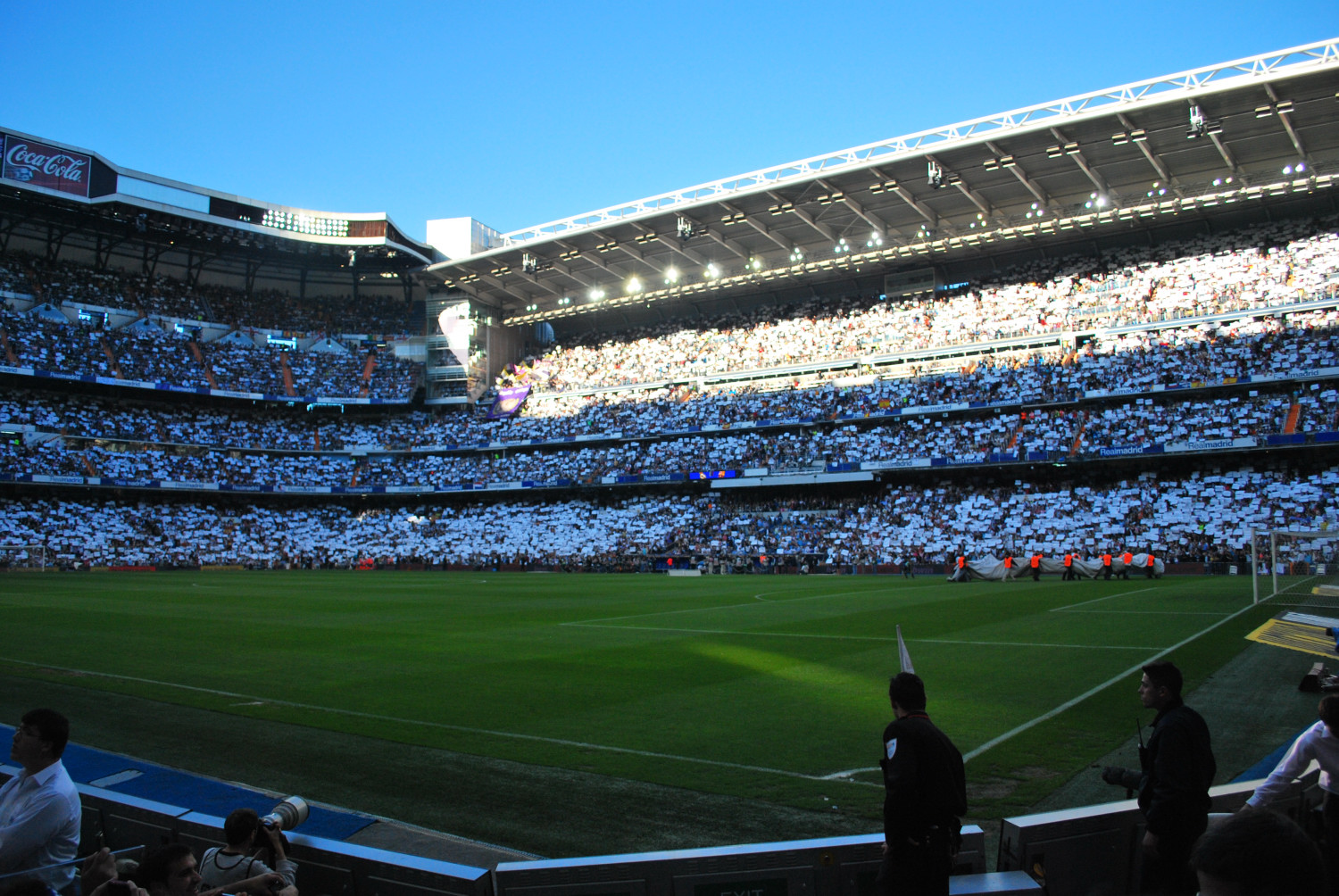
Real Madrid fans displaying the white of their club before El Clásico. Real Madrid fans also often wave Spanish flags at El Clásico games.

As early as the 1930s, Barcelona "had developed a reputation as a symbol of Catalan identity, opposed to the centralising tendencies of Madrid". During the dictatorships of Miguel Primo de Rivera and especially Francisco Franco, all regional languages and identities in Spain were frowned upon and restrained. As such, most citizens of Barcelona were in strong opposition to Franco's regime. In that period, Barcelona gained their motto Més que un club (English: More than a club) because of its alleged connection to Catalan nationalist as well as to progressive beliefs.

There is an ongoing controversy as to what extent Franco's rule (1939–75) influenced the activities and on-pitch results of both Barcelona and Real Madrid. Fans of both clubs tend to exaggerate the myths favouring their narratives. Most historians agree that Franco did not have a preferred football team, but his Spanish nationalist beliefs led him to associate himself with the establishment teams, such as Atlético Aviación and Madrid FC (that recovered its "royal" name after the fall of the Republic and again became Real Madrid). On the other hand, he also wanted the renamed Barcelona succeed as "Spanish team", rather than a Catalan one. During the early years of Franco's rule, Real Madrid were not particularly successful, winning two Copa del Generalísimo titles and a Copa Eva Duarte; Barcelona claimed three league titles, one Copa del Generalísimo and one Copa Eva Duarte. During that period, Atlético Aviación were believed to be the preferred team over Real Madrid. The most contested stories of the period include Real Madrid's 11–1 home win against Barcelona in the Copa del Generalísimo, where the Catalan team alleged intimidation, and the controversial transfer of Alfredo Di Stéfano to Real Madrid, despite his agreement with Barcelona. The latter transfer was part of Real Madrid chairman Santiago Bernabéu's "revolution" that ushered in the era of unprecedented dominance. Bernabéu, himself a veteran of the Civil War who fought for Franco's forces, saw Real Madrid on top, not only of Spanish, but also European football, helping create the European Cup, the first true competition for Europe's best club sides. His vision was fulfilled when Real Madrid not only started winning consecutive league titles, but also swept the first five editions of the European Cup in the 1950s. These events had a profound impact on Spanish football and influenced Franco's attitude. According to historians, during this time he realized the importance of Real Madrid for his regime's international image, and the club became his preferred team until his death. Fernando Maria Castiella, who served as minister of foreign affairs under Franco from 1957 until 1969, noted that "[Real Madrid] is the best embassy we have ever had". Franco died in 1975, and the Spanish transition to democracy soon followed. Under his rule, Real Madrid had won 14 league titles, six Copa del Generalísimo titles, one Copa Eva Duarte, six European Cups, two Latin Cups and one Intercontinental Cup. In the same period, Barcelona had won eight league titles, nine Copa del Generalísimo titles, three Copa Eva Duarte titles, three Inter-Cities Fairs Cups and two Latin Cups.

The rivalry was intensified during the 1950s when the clubs disputed the signing of Alfredo Di Stéfano. Di Stéfano had impressed both Barcelona and Real Madrid while playing for Los Millonarios in Bogotá, Colombia, during a players' strike in his native Argentina. Soon after Millonarios' return to Colombia, Barcelona directors visited Buenos Aires and agreed with River Plate, the last FIFA-affiliated team to have held Di Stéfano's rights, for his transfer in 1954 for the equivalent of 150 million Italian lira (according to other sources 200,000 dollars). This started a battle between the two Spanish rivals for his rights. FIFA appointed Armando Muñoz Calero, former president of the Spanish Football Federation as mediator. Calero decided to let Di Stéfano play the 1953–54 and 1955–56 seasons in Madrid, and the 1954–55 and 1956–57 seasons in Barcelona. The agreement was approved by the Football Association and their respective clubs. Although the Catalans agreed, the decision created various discontent among the Blaugrana members and the president was forced to resign in September 1953. Barcelona sold Madrid their half-share, and Di Stéfano moved to Los Blancos, signing a four-year contract. Real paid 5.5 million Spanish pesetas for the transfer, plus a 1.3 million bonus for the purchase, an annual fee to be paid to the Millonarios, and a 16,000 salary for Di Stéfano with a bonus double that of his teammates, for a total of 40% of the annual revenue of the Madrid club.

Di Stéfano became integral in the subsequent success achieved by Real Madrid, scoring twice in his first game against Barcelona. With him, Madrid won the first five editions of the European Cup. The 1960s saw the rivalry reach the European stage when Real Madrid and Barcelona met twice in the European Cup, with Madrid triumphing en route to their fifth consecutive title in 1959–60 and Barcelona prevailing en route to losing the final in 1960–61. Ahead of the 1973–74 season, Johan Cruyff arrived to Barcelona for a world record £920,000 from Ajax. Already an established player with Ajax, Cruyff quickly won over the Barcelona fans when he told the European press that he chose Barcelona over Real Madrid because he could not play for a club associated with Francisco Franco. He further endeared himself when he named his son "Jordi", after the local Catalan Saint George. In 2002, the European encounter between the clubs was dubbed the "Match of The Century" by Spanish media, and Madrid's win was watched by more than 500 million people around the world. A fixture known for its intensity and indiscipline, it has also featured memorable goal celebrations from both teams, often involving mocking the opposition. In October 1999, Real Madrid forward Raúl silenced 100,000 Barcelona fans at the Camp Nou when he scored before he celebrated by putting a finger to his lips as if telling the crowd to be quiet. In 2009, Barcelona captain Carles Puyol kissed his Catalan armband in front of Madrid fans at the Bernabéu. Cristiano Ronaldo twice gestured to the hostile crowd to "calm down" after scoring against Barcelona at the Camp Nou in 2012 and 2016. In April 2017, Messi celebrated his 93rd-minute winner for Barcelona against Real Madrid at the Bernabéu by taking off his Barcelona shirt and holding it up to incensed Real Madrid fans – with his name and number facing them. Later that year, in August, Ronaldo was subbed on in the first leg of the Supercopa de España, proceeded to score in the 80th minute and took his shirt off before holding it up to Barça's fans with his name and number facing them.

=== El Derbi madrileño ===
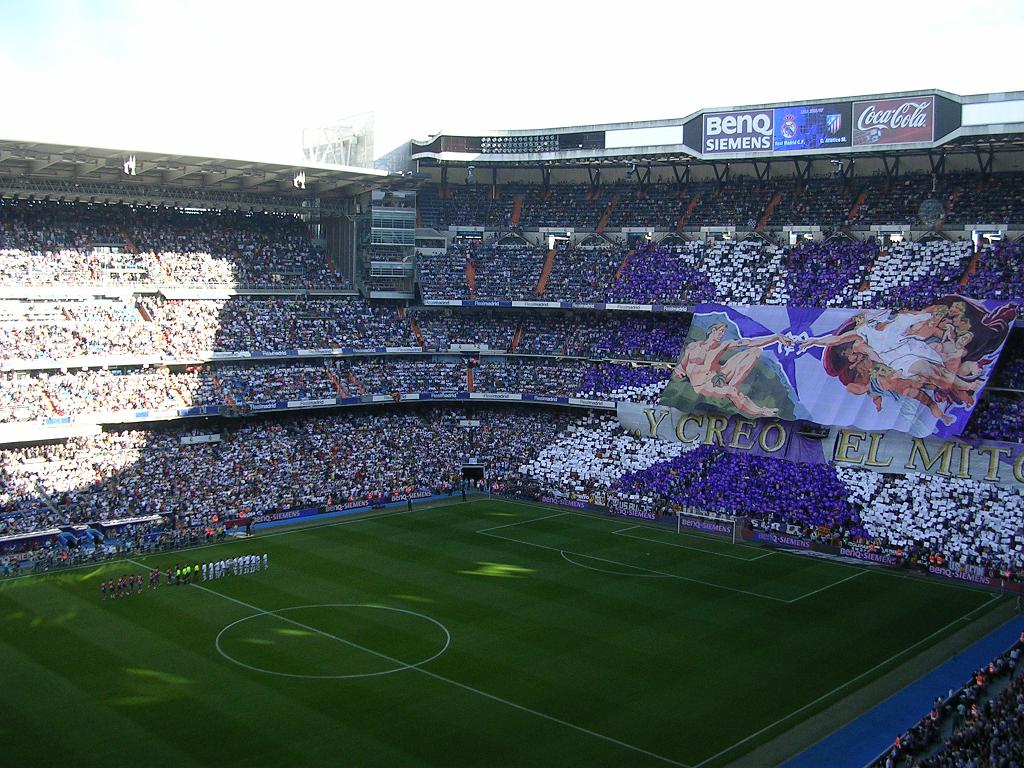
Real Madrid supporters during the October 1, 2006 El Derbi madrileño match held at the Santiago Bernabéu

The club's nearest neighbour is Atlético Madrid, a rivalry being shared between fans of both football teams. Although Atlético was founded by three Basque students in 1903, it was joined in 1904 by dissident members of "Madrid FC". The two teams met for the first time on 2 December 1906 in the regional championship, with Real Madrid winning 2–1. Their first league meeting came on 21 February 1929 in matchday three of the first league championship at the former Chamartín. It was the first official derby of the new tournament, and Real won 2–1. After the Civil War, during the early Francoist period, Atlético became associated with the military air force (and thus renamed Atlético Aviación), although the alleged preference of the regime for the club is subject to discussion. In any case, during this period Atlético became the most successful club in Spain, reducing the historical gap between the two clubs, until the regime preference shifted towards Real Madrid in the 1950s, as Franco sought to make political capital out of Real Madrid's multiple European Cup titles at a time when Spain was internationally isolated; one minister said, "Real Madrid are the best ambassadors we've ever had". Thus, Atlético fans regularly chanted that Real were "El equipo del gobierno, la vergüenza del país" – "The team of the government, the shame of the country" – and allegedly adopted a more left-wing slant (tempered by the rise of ultras culture and Rayo Vallecano's presence as the "true" leftist club in Madrid).

The rivalry first gained international attention in 1959 during the European Cup when the two clubs met in the semi-finals. Real won the first leg 2–1 at the Santiago Bernabéu, while Atlético won 1–0 at the Metropolitano. The tie went to a replay, which Real won 2–1. Atlético, however, gained some revenge when, led by former Real Madrid coach José Villalonga, it defeated its city rivals in two successive Copa del Generalísimo finals in 1960 and 1961. In the 1970s, Atlético again took the lead as the most successful Spanish club of the decade, which prompted the Real Madrid fanbase to look down on Atlético calling them and their supporters "Indios" (Indians, a reference to the Latin American players signed by the Red-and-whites). By then, Real Madrid did not want to sign non-Caucasian players (president Santiago Bernabéu even stated, when he decided not to sign Portuguese star Eusebio at the end of the 1960s, "Mientras yo viva, aquí no jugará ningún negro ni un blanco con bigote" ("As long as I live, no black or white with a mustache will play here"). Atlético's supporters accepted the new "Indian" nickname joyfully and have been using it until today. The Santiago Bernabéu, Real Madrid's stadium, is alongside banks and businesses on the upper class Paseo de la Castellana street, while the Vicente Calderón (the stadium that Atlético Madrid used until the 2016–17 season) could be found near a brewery, alongside the Manzanares River and a motorway. Real draw greater support all across the region because of their historically greater resources and success, while Atlético have a relatively working class fan base mainly from the south of the city, with some fans also scattered throughout the city. In fact, the Atlético crest includes the Coat of arms of Madrid, whereas Real crest has no such a reference to the city (instead, it includes a reference to the broader Castile region).

Between 1961 and 1989, when Real dominated La Liga, only Atlético offered it any serious challenge, winning league titles in 1966, 1970, 1973 and 1977. In 1965, Atlético became the first team to beat Real at the Bernabéu in eight years. Real Madrid's record against Atlético in more recent times has been favourable. A high point came in the 2002–03 season, when Real clinched the La Liga title after a 4–0 victory at the Vicente Calderón. Atlético's first win over its city rivals since 1999 came in the Copa del Rey final in May 2013. In 2013–14, Real and Atlético were finalists of the UEFA Champions League, the first final which hosted two clubs from the same city. Real Madrid triumphed with a 4–1 comeback victory in extra time. On 7 February 2015, Real suffered their first defeat in 14 years at the Vicente Calderón, a 4–0 loss. On 28 May 2016, Real and Atlético again met for the Champions League title, which resulted in a win for Real after a penalty shootout at the San Siro.

=== El Viejo Clásico ===
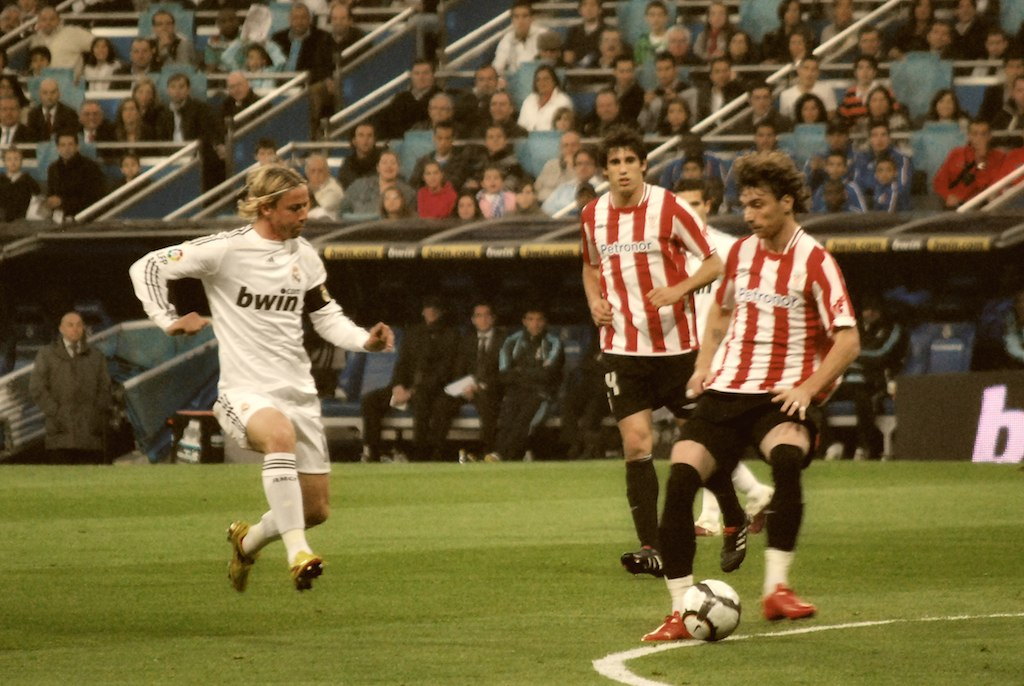
Real Madrid's Guti (left) and Athletic Bilbao's Javi Martínez (centre) and Amorebieta (right) during a match at the Bernabéu, 2010

A further minor rivalry exists between Real Madrid and Athletic Bilbao. This is known as El Viejo Clásico (the old classic), so named as the two clubs were dominant in the first half of the 20th century, meeting in nine Copa del Rey finals including the first in 1903. Until 10 December 2011, this fixture was the most played in the history of Spanish football, when it was surpassed by El Clásico.

Athletic Bilbao, who operate a policy of only using local players, have long since ceased to be a competitive rival to clubs such as Real Madrid, who scour the globe for the best talent; the Lions won only two of the 26 matches between the teams from 2005–06 to 2016–17. However, the matches remain keenly fought due to their historical and cultural significance, with some parallels to the political aspect of the Barcelona/Catalonia rivalry as Athletic are the largest club in the Basque region.

=== European rivalries ===
==== Bayern Munich ====
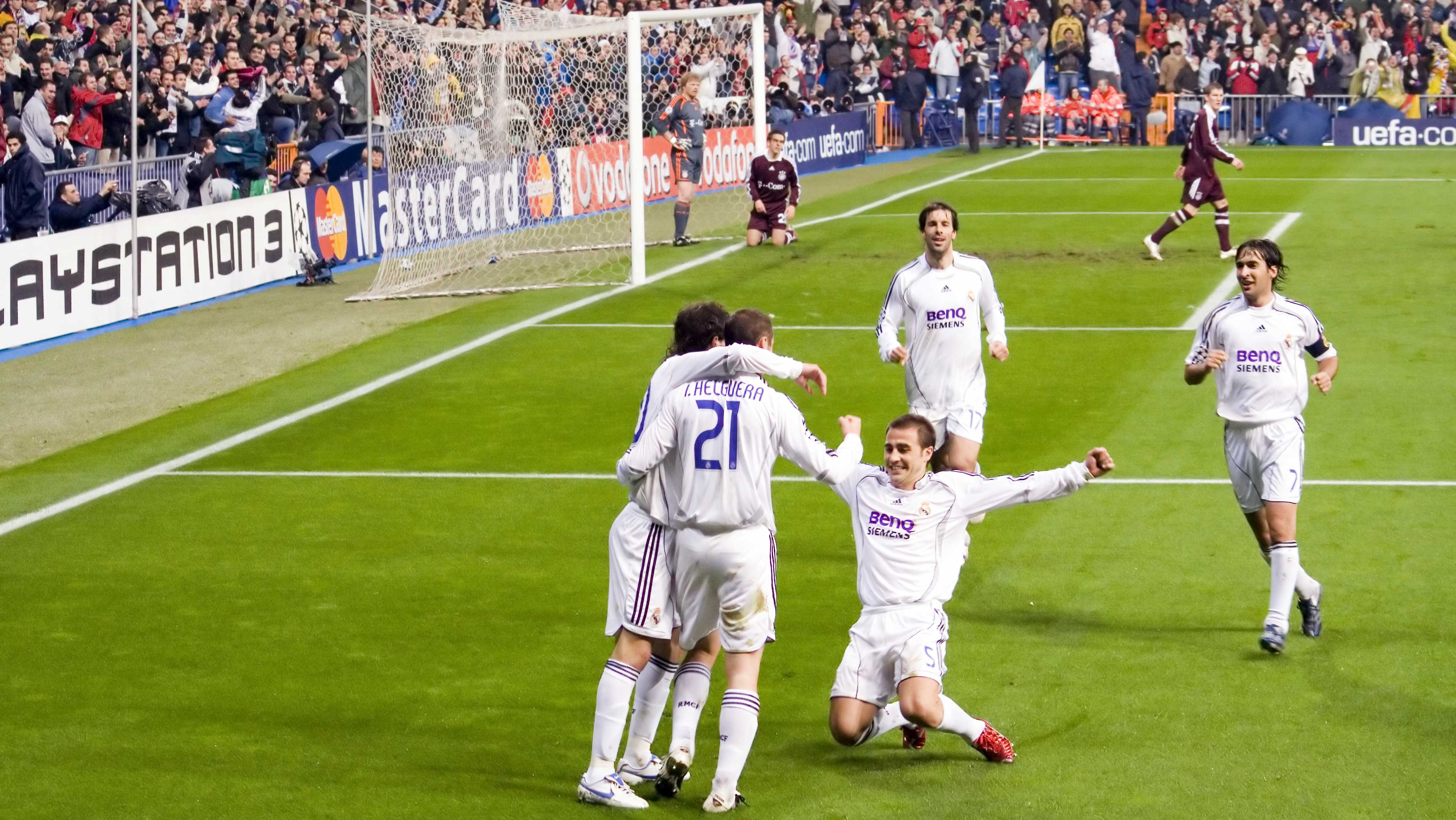
Real Madrid players celebrating a goal against Bayern Munich in 2007

Real Madrid and Bayern Munich are two of the most successful clubs in the UEFA Champions League/European Cup competition, with Real winning 15 times and Bayern winning six times. Although they have never met in a final, Real Madrid versus Bayern is the match that has historically been played most often in the Champions League/European Cup with 30 matches (thirteen wins for each of Madrid and Bayern, with four draws), with several controversial incidents occurring due to the great importance of most of their meetings. Real Madrid supporters often refer to Bayern as the "Bestia negra" ("Black Beast").

During the 2010s, the two teams met in the 2011–12 Champions League semi-finals, which ended 3–3 on aggregate (Bayern won 3–1 on penalties after extra time, but lost the final at their own stadium by the same method), then at the same stage in the 2013–14 edition with Real Madrid winning 5–0 on aggregate, and again in 2017–18 with the Spanish club progressing 4–3; both times they went on to win the competition.

==== Juventus ====
Another match that is often played in the European Cup/Champions League is Real Madrid vs Juventus, the most decorated Italian club. They have played each other in 21 matches and have an almost perfectly balanced record (nine wins for Juventus, ten wins for Real Madrid and two draws), as well as nearly the same goal difference (Madrid ahead 26 to 25).

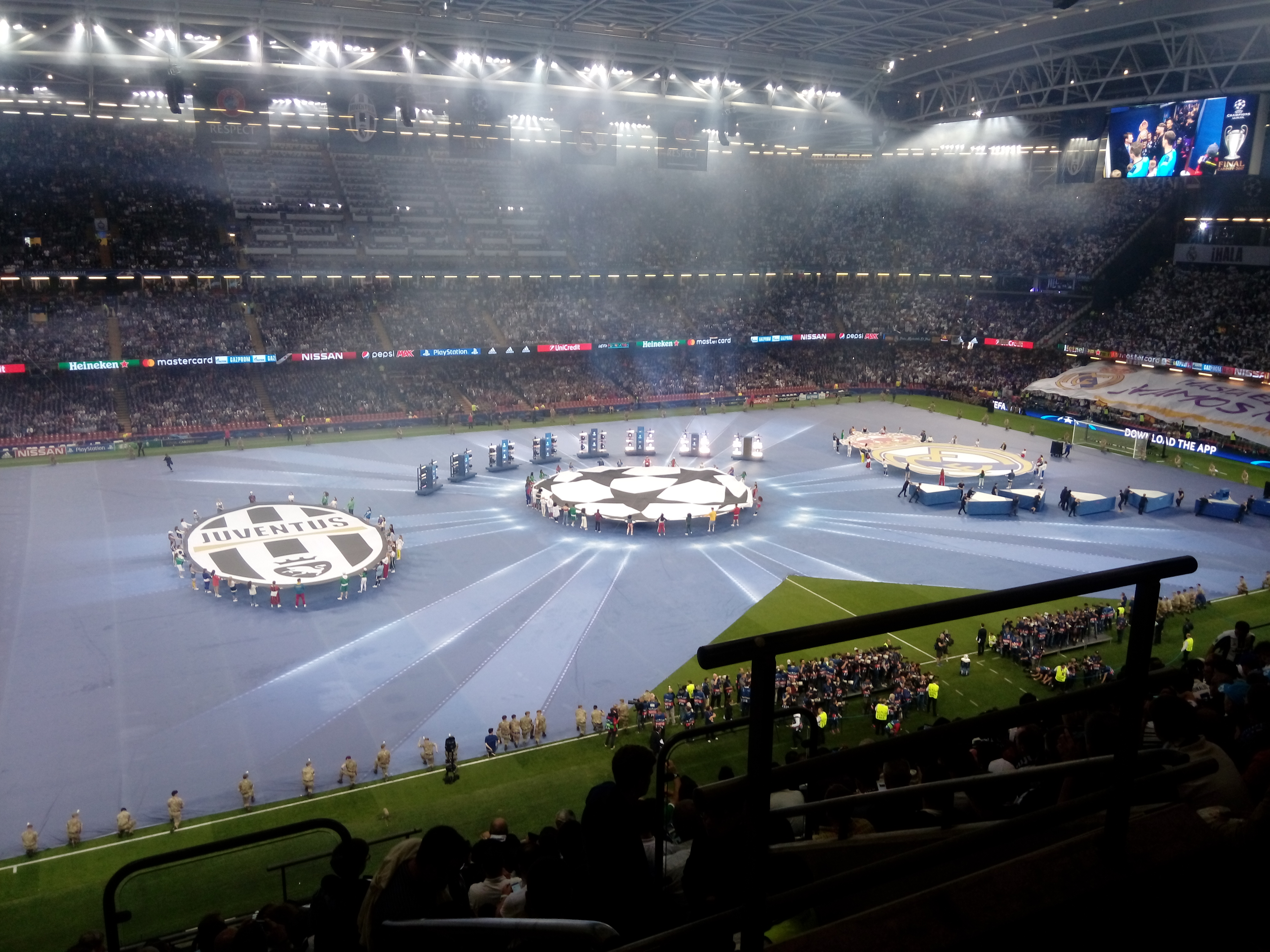
Pre-match display at the 2017 Champions League final between Real Madrid and Juventus

Their first meeting was in the quarter-finals of the 1961–62 European Cup, which Real Madrid won 3–1 in a replay held in Paris. At the quarter-final stage in 1995–96, Juventus prevailed 2–1 over the two legs and went on to lift the trophy. In the 1998 UEFA Champions League Final between the teams in Amsterdam, Real Madrid won 1–0. They met again in the 2002–03 UEFA Champions League semi-finals, when both clubs were in their respective 'golden eras'; Juventus won 4–3 on aggregate. By that time, star midfielder Zinedine Zidane, who played for the Bianconeri in the 1998 final, had moved from Turin to Madrid in a world record €77 million deal.

The teams met again in the 2013–14 UEFA Champions League group stage, with Madrid winning 2–1 at home and drawing 2–2 away en route to their tenth title. In the 2014–15 UEFA Champions League semi-finals, former Real Madrid player Álvaro Morata scored one goal in each leg to take Juventus to the final, winning 3–2 on aggregate, while Cristiano Ronaldo scored both goals for Madrid. They faced off again in the 2017 UEFA Champions League Final in Cardiff, with Ronaldo scoring twice as Real Madrid won 4–1.

The latest Champions League meeting was in the 2017–18 quarter-finals, which Real Madrid won 4–3 on aggregate; the tie ended in dramatic and controversial fashion, with a debatable penalty awarded to Real Madrid in the last minute of the second leg after Juventus built a 3–0 lead at the Bernabeu to pull level in the tie following a defeat at the Allianz Stadium by the same scoreline. Cristiano Ronaldo scored three goals over the two matches including the decisive penalty and a spectacular overhead kick, and having won the Champions League with Madrid for a fourth time, he transferred to Juventus a few months later for a €117 million fee.

== Finances and ownership ==
It was under Florentino Pérez's first presidency (2000–2006) that Real Madrid started its ambition of becoming the world's richest professional football club. The club ceded part of its training grounds to the city of Madrid in 2001, and sold the rest to four corporations: Repsol YPF, Mutua Automovilística de Madrid, Sacyr Vallehermoso and OHL. The sale eradicated the club's debts, paving the way for it to buy the world's most expensive players, such as Zinedine Zidane, Luís Figo, Ronaldo and David Beckham. The city had previously rezoned the training grounds for development, a move which in turn increased their value, and then bought the site. The European Commission started an investigation into whether the city overpaid for the property, to be considered a form of state subsidy.

The sale of the training ground for office buildings cleared Real Madrid's debts of €270 million and enabled the club to embark upon an unprecedented spending spree which brought big-name players to the club. In addition, profit from the sale was spent on a state-of-the-art training complex on the city's outskirts. Although Pérez's policy resulted in increased financial success from the exploitation of the club's high marketing potential around the world, especially in Asia, it came under increasing criticism for being too focused on marketing the Real Madrid brand and not enough on the performances of the team.

By September 2007, Real Madrid was considered the most valuable football brand in Europe by BBDO. In 2008, it was ranked the second-most valuable club in world football, at €951 million (£640 million / $1.285 billion), only beaten by Manchester United, which was valued at €1.333 billion (£900 million). In 2010, Real Madrid had the highest turnover in football worldwide. In September 2009, Real Madrid's management announced plans to open the club's own dedicated theme park by 2013, and in 2024 unveiled Real Madrid World in Dubai.

A study at Harvard University concluded that Real Madrid "is one of the 20 most important brand names and the only one in which its executives, the players, are well-known. We have some spectacular figures in regard to worldwide support of the club. There are an estimated 287 million people worldwide who follow Real Madrid." In 2010, Forbes evaluated Real Madrid's worth to be around €992 million (US$1.323 billion), ranking them second only to Manchester United, based on figures from the 2008–09 season. According to Deloitte, Real Madrid had a recorded revenue of €401 million in the same period, ranking first.

Along with Barcelona, Athletic Bilbao and Osasuna, Real Madrid is organised as a registered association. This means that the club is owned by its supporters, who elect the president. The president cannot invest his own money, and the club can only spend what it earns, which is mainly derived through sponsorships, commercial partnerships, merchandise sales, television rights, prize money and ticket sales. Unlike a limited company, it is not possible to purchase shares in the club, but only a membership. The members of Real Madrid, called "socios", form an assembly of delegates which is the highest governing body of the club. As of 2010, the club had 60,000 socios. At the end of the 2009–10 season, the club's board of directors stated that Real Madrid had a net debt of €244.6 million, €82.1 million lower than the previous fiscal year. Real Madrid announced that it had a net debt of €170 million after the 2010–11 season. From 2007 to 2011, the club made a net profit of €190 million.

During the 2009–10 season, Real Madrid made €150 million through ticket sales, the most of any club in top-flight football. Real Madrid has the highest number of shirt sales per season, around 1.5 million. For the 2010–11 season, Madrid's wage bill totalled €169 million, which was second-highest in Europe behind Barcelona; furthermore, its wage bill to turnover ratio was the best in Europe at 43 percent, ahead of Manchester United and Arsenal at 46 percent and 50 percent, respectively. In 2013, Forbes listed the club as the world's most valuable sports team, worth $3.3 billion. Real Madrid was valued at €3.47 billion ($4.1 billion) in 2018, and in the 2016–17 season it was the second highest-earning football club in the world, with an annual revenue of €674.6 million. In November 2018, the average first-team pay at Madrid was £8.1m ($10.6m) per year, making it the second-highest paid sports team in the world after Barcelona. In 2022, Forbes listed Real Madrid as the most valuable football club in the world, at $5.1 billion.

Real Madrid became the first football club to generate over €1 billion in revenue in the 2023–24 season, according to the Deloitte Football Money League 2025.

== Popular culture ==
Real Madrid was the featured club in the second installment of the Goal! football movie trilogy, Goal! 2: Living the Dream... (2007). The film follows former Newcastle United star Santiago Muñez as he is first scouted and then signed by Real Madrid for the 2005–06 season. The film's creators wanted to put emphasis on the changes in Muñez's life after his move to Madrid. Production was done with the full support of UEFA, allowing the film crew to use many real life players in cameo roles. Real Madrid squad members featured in the film included Iker Casillas, Zinedine Zidane, David Beckham, Ronaldo, Roberto Carlos, Raúl, Sergio Ramos, Robinho, Michael Owen, Míchel Salgado, Júlio Baptista, Steve McManaman and Iván Helguera. In the film, both Florentino Pérez and Alfredo Di Stéfano presented the fictional player Muñez to the club after his signing.

Real, The Movie (Real, la pelicula) is a 2005 part feature, part documentary film that showcases the worldwide passion for Real Madrid. Produced by the club and directed by Borja Manso, it follows five sub-stories of fans from around the world and their love for the club. Along with the fictional portion of the film, it also contains real footage of the squad, during training at Ciudad Real Madrid, matches, and interviews. Although the film mentions all of the squad, it mainly focuses on galácticos such as David Beckham, Zinedine Zidane, Raúl, Luís Figo, Ronaldo, Iker Casillas and Roberto Carlos, among others. The film was originally produced in Spanish, but has been dubbed for their worldwide fanbase.

The book White Storm: 100 years of Real Madrid by Phil Ball was the first English-language history of Real Madrid. Published in 2002, it talks about the most successful moments of the club during its first centenary, having been translated into various languages. In late 2011, Real Madrid released a digital music album, entitled Legends, and a remix of the club's anthem, "Himno del Real Madrid", was released as the first single from the album.

=== Real Madrid TV ===
Real Madrid TV is an encrypted digital television channel, operated by Real Madrid and specialising in the club. The channel is available in Spanish and English. It is located at Ciudad Real Madrid in Valdebebas (Madrid), Real Madrid's training centre. It can also be watched via the Real Madrid app.

=== Hala Madrid ===
Hala Madrid is a magazine published quarterly for the Real Madrid club members and the Madridistas Fan Club card holders. The phrase Hala Madrid, meaning "Forward Madrid" or "Go Madrid", is also the title of the club's official anthem, which is often sung by the Madridistas (the club's fans). The magazine includes reports on the club's matches in the previous month, as well as information about the reserve and youth teams. Features often include interviews with players, both past and present, and the club's historic matches.

=== Video games ===
Real Madrid has appeared in many football-based video games, namely in the FIFA, EA Sports FC and Pro Evolution Soccer series. A Real Madrid player has appeared on the cover of both titles a combined seven times.

In 2007, Spanish game publisher Virgin Play signed a deal with the club to make officially licensed Real Madrid video games. The only one released under the deal (due to Virgin Play's liquidation in September 2009) would end up being Real Madrid: The Game, which was developed by Atomic Planet Entertainment and was published under Virgin Play's publishing division V.2 Play in May 2009 for the PlayStation 2, PlayStation Portable, Windows, Wii and Nintendo DS exclusively in European territories Virgin Play released their products in. The game featured a career mode with a mixture of role-playing and simulation as well as arcade-styled Football gameplay.

== Honours ==
Real Madrid CF honours
Type	Competition	Titles	Seasons
Domestic	La Liga	36	1931–32, 1932–33, 1953–54, 1954–55, 1956–57, 1957–58, 1960–61, 1961–62, 1962–63, 1963–64, 1964–65, 1966–67, 1967–68, 1968–69, 1971–72, 1974–75, 1975–76, 1977–78, 1978–79, 1979–80, 1985–86, 1986–87, 1987–88, 1988–89, 1989–90, 1994–95, 1996–97, 2000–01, 2002–03, 2006–07, 2007–08, 2011–12, 2016–17, 2019–20, 2021–22, 2023–24
Domestic	Copa del Rey	20	1905, 1906, 1907, 1908, 1917, 1934, 1936, 1946, 1947, 1961–62, 1969–70, 1973–74, 1974–75, 1979–80, 1981–82, 1988–89, 1992–93, 2010–11, 2013–14, 2022–23
Domestic	Copa de la Liga	1	1985
Domestic	Supercopa de España	13	1988, 1989, 1990, 1993, 1997, 2001, 2003, 2008, 2012, 2017, 2020, 2022, 2024
Domestic	Copa Eva Duarte	1	1947
Continental	European Cup/UEFA Champions League	15	1955–56, 1956–57, 1957–58, 1958–59, 1959–60, 1965–66, 1997–98, 1999–2000, 2001–02, 2013–14, 2015–16, 2016–17, 2017–18, 2021–22, 2023–24
Continental	UEFA Cup/UEFA Europa League	2	1984–85, 1985–86
Continental	UEFA Super Cup	6	2002, 2014, 2016, 2017, 2022, 2024
Continental	Latin Cup	2^{s}	1955, 1957
Intercontinental	Ibero-American Cup	1	1994
Worldwide	FIFA Club World Cup	5	2014, 2016, 2017, 2018, 2022
Worldwide	Intercontinental Cup	3^{s}	1960, 1998, 2002
Worldwide	FIFA Intercontinental Cup	1^{s}	2024
Regional	Campeonato de Madrid/Campeonato Regional Centro	23	1903, 1905, 1906, 1906–07, 1907–08, 1912–13, 1915–16, 1916–17, 1917–18, 1919–20, 1921–22, 1922–23, 1923–24, 1925–26, 1926–27, 1928–29, 1929–30, 1930–31, 1931–32, 1932–33, 1933–34, 1934–35, 1935–36
Regional	Copa Federación Centro	4^{s}	1922–23, 1927–28, 1943–44, 1944–45

- record
- ^{s} shared record

== Players ==
=== Current squad ===
As of 2 September 2026

Note: Flags indicate national team as defined under FIFA eligibility rules; some limited exceptions apply. Players may hold more than one non-FIFA nationality.

No.	Pos.	Nation	Player
1	GK	BEL	Thibaut Courtois
2	DF	ESP	Raúl Asencio
3	DF	BRA	Éder Militão
4	DF	ESP	Dean Huijsen
5	MF	ENG	Jude Bellingham
6	MF	FRA	Eduardo Camavinga
7	FW	BRA	Vinícius Júnior (vice-captain)
8	MF	URU	Federico Valverde (captain)
9	FW	BRA	Endrick
10	FW	FRA	Kylian Mbappé
11	FW	BRA	Rodrygo
12	DF	ENG	Trent Alexander-Arnold
13	GK	UKR	Andriy Lunin

No.	Pos.	Nation	Player
14	MF	FRA	Aurélien Tchouaméni
15	MF	TUR	Arda Güler
16	DF	FRA	Ibrahima Konaté
17	DF	ESP	Marc Cucurella
18	DF	ESP	Álvaro Carreras
19	FW	ESP	Carlos Espí
20	MF	POR	Bernardo Silva
21	FW	MAR	Brahim Díaz
22	DF	GER	Antonio Rüdiger
23	DF	FRA	Ferland Mendy
24	DF	NED	Denzel Dumfries
25	FW	CIV	Yan Diomande
27	MF	ESP	Thiago Pitarch

=== Reserve and Academy teams ===
Note: Flags indicate national team as defined under FIFA eligibility rules; some limited exceptions apply. Players may hold more than one non-FIFA nationality.

No.	Pos.	Nation	Player
26	GK	ESP	Sergio Mestre
28	DF	ESP	Jesús Fortea
29	MF	ESP	Jorge Cestero
30	DF	ESP	Joan Martínez
31	GK	ESP	Javi Navarro
32	MF	ESP	Diego Lacosta

No.	Pos.	Nation	Player
33	DF	ESP	Mario Rivas
35	FW	ESP	Daniel Yáñez
36	MF	ESP	Alexis Ciria
37	MF	ESP	Gabri Valero
38	MF	ESP	Sergio Martínez
39	GK	UKR	Illia Voloshyn

=== Out on loan ===
Note: Flags indicate national team as defined under FIFA eligibility rules; some limited exceptions apply. Players may hold more than one non-FIFA nationality.

No.	Pos.	Nation	Player
30	FW	ARG	Franco Mastantuono (at Fiorentina until 30 June 2027)

== Personnel ==
=== Current technical staff ===
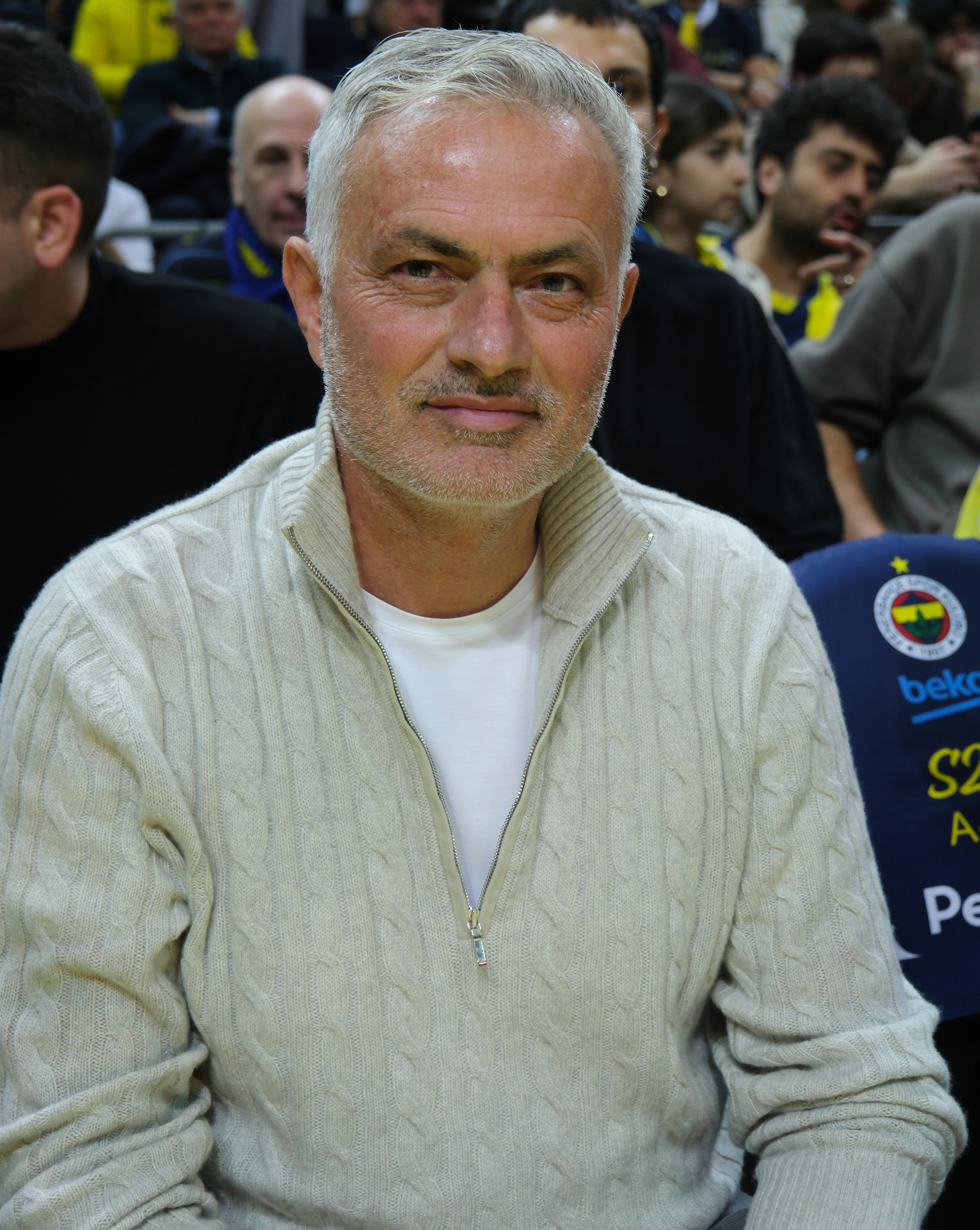
José Mourinho is the current head coach of Real Madrid

Role	Staff
Head coach	(Portugal) José Mourinho
Assistant coaches	(Portugal) João Tralhão
Assistant coaches	(Portugal) Pedro Machado
Assistant coaches	(Germany) Sami Khedira
Goalkeeper coach	(Portugal) Nuno Santos
Fitness coach	(Portugal) António Dias
Fitness coach	(Italy) Antonio Pintus
Sports sciences	(Portugal) Sandro Carriço
Head analyst	(Italy) Roberto Merella

- Last updated: 10 July 2026
- Source: Real Madrid CF

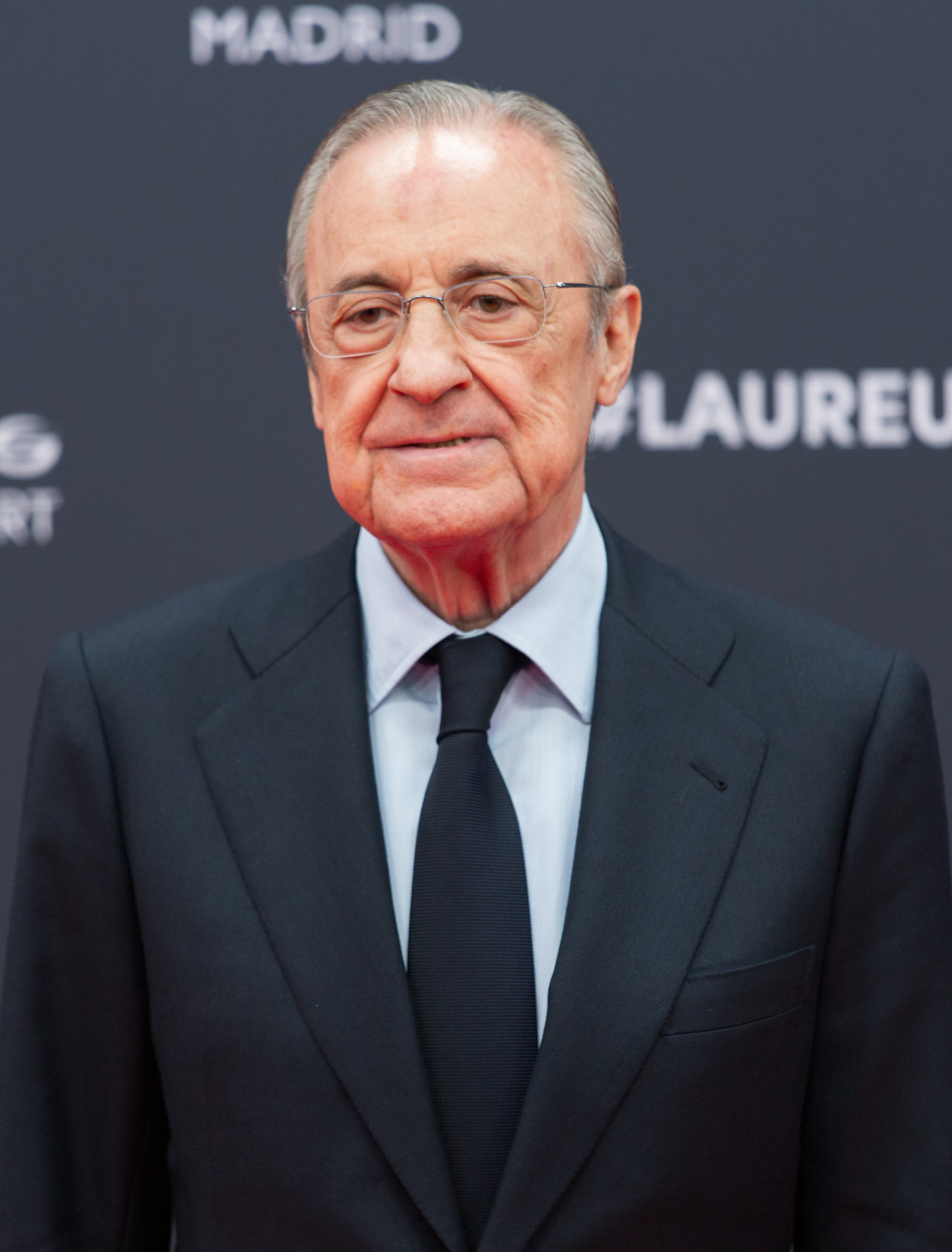
Spanish businessman Florentino Pérez is the current president of the club

=== Management ===
Role	Name
President	(Spain) Florentino Pérez
Vice-presidents	(Spain) Eduardo Fernández de Blas
Vice-presidents	(Spain) Pedro López Jiménez
Vice-presidents	(Spain) Enrique Sánchez González
Vice-presidents	(Spain) Enrique Pérez Rodríguez
Honorary president	(Spain) Pirri
Secretary	(Spain) José Luis del Valle Pérez
Members	(Spain) Jerónimo Farré Muncharaz (Spain) Manuel Cerezo Velázquez (Spain) José Sánchez Bernal (Spain) Manuel Torres Gómez (Spain) Manuel Gómez Barrera (Spain) Gumersindo Santamaría Gil (Spain) José Manuel Otero Lastres (Spain) Nicolás Martín-Sanz García (Spain) Manuel Redondo Sierra (Spain) Catalina Miñarro Brugarolas (Spain) José Ángel Sánchez Periáñez (Spain) Francisco García Sanz (Spain) Donato González Sánchez

- Last updated: 4 June 2024
- Source: Real Madrid CF

== See also ==
- European Club Association
- List of fan-owned sports teams
- List of world champion football clubs
