= Joan Martínez =

Joan Martínez may refer to:

- Joan Martinez Alier (born 1939), Catalan economist
- Joan Martínez Vilaseca (1943–2021), Spanish footballer and manager
- Joan Lino Martínez (born 1978), Spanish athlete
- Joan Martínez (footballer, born 2007) (Joan Martínez Lozano), Spanish footballer
