= 2026–27 Atalanta BC season =

Atalanta
2026–27 season
- President: Antonio Percassi
- Head coach: Maurizio Sarri
- Stadium: New Balance Arena
- Serie A: 12th
- Coppa Italia: Round of 16
- UEFA Conference League: League phase
- Top goalscorer: League: Nikola Krstović (7); All: Nikola Krstović (8)
- Highest home attendance: 21,977 vs Cagliari; 12 September 2026, Serie A
- Lowest home attendance: 18,218 vs Kairat; 5 November 2026, Conference League
- Average home league attendance: 21,277
- Biggest win: 3–1 vs Venezia (H); 12 October 2026, Serie A 3–1 vs Pafos (H); 15 October 2026, Conference League
- Biggest defeat: 0–3 vs Parma (H); 2 November 2026, Serie A
Home colours	Away colours	Third colours

The 2026–27 season is the 120th season in the history of Atalanta BC, and the club's 16th consecutive season in the Italian top flight. In addition to the domestic league, the club is participating in the Coppa Italia and the UEFA Conference League.

== Players ==
=== First-team squad ===
As of 1 September 2026

Note: Flags indicate national team as defined under FIFA eligibility rules; some limited exceptions apply. Players may hold more than one non-FIFA nationality.

No.	Pos.	Nation	Player
3	DF	CIV	Odilon Kossounou
4	DF	SWE	Isak Hien
7	FW	GHA	Kamaldeen Sulemana
8	MF	CRO	Mario Pašalić
9	FW	ITA	Gianluca Scamacca
10	MF	SRB	Lazar Samardžić
11	FW	ENG	Jonathan Rowe (on loan from Bologna)
13	MF	BRA	Éderson (captain)
16	DF	ITA	Raoul Bellanova
17	MF	BEL	Charles De Ketelaere
18	FW	ITA	Giacomo Raspadori
19	MF	CIV	Franck Kessié

No.	Pos.	Nation	Player
22	GK	ITA	Thomas Pompei
23	DF	BIH	Sead Kolašinac
29	GK	ITA	Marco Carnesecchi
31	DF	DEN	Thomas Kristensen (on loan from Udinese)
42	DF	ITA	Giorgio Scalvini
47	DF	ITA	Lorenzo Bernasconi
57	GK	ITA	Marco Sportiello
59	MF	POL	Nicola Zalewski
70	MF	ITA	Gianluca Gaetano
77	DF	ITA	Davide Zappacosta
90	FW	MNE	Nikola Krstović
99	MF	MKD	Eljif Elmas (on loan from RB Leipzig)

=== Atalanta U23 ===
Note: Flags indicate national team as defined under FIFA eligibility rules; some limited exceptions apply. Players may hold more than one non-FIFA nationality.

No. / Pos. / Nation / Player; 40 / DF / SRB / Relja Obrić	No. / Pos. / Nation / Player; 52 / MF / ITA / Alberto Manzoni

== Transfers ==
=== Summer window ===
==== In ====
Date	Pos.	Player	From	Fee	Notes	Ref.
1 July 2026	DF	(Croatia) Ljubo Puljić	(Germany) Bayern Munich	€2,800,000	Joined Atalanta U23	
9 July 2026	MF	(Italy) Gianluca Gaetano	(Italy) Cagliari	€12,000,000	+ €2,000,000 in add-ons	
13 August 2026	DF	(Denmark) Thomas Kristensen	(Italy) Udinese	€22,000,000	+ €3,000,000 in add-ons	
29 August 2026	MF	(Ivory Coast) Franck Kessié	(Saudi Arabia) Al-Ahli	Free		
1 September 2026	GK	(Italy) Thomas Pompei	(Italy) Cosenza	Undisclosed		

==== Loans in ====
Date	Pos.	Player	From	Fee	Notes	Ref.
22 August 2026	MF	(North Macedonia) Eljif Elmas	(Germany) RB Leipzig	€2,000,000	Option to buy for €15,000,000	
1 September 2026	FW	(England) Jonathan Rowe	(Italy) Bologna	€5,000,000	Obligation to buy for €35,000,000 under certain conditions	

==== Loan returns ====
Date	Pos.	Player	From	Fee	Notes	Ref.
30 June 2026	DF	(Italy) Giovanni Bonfanti	(Italy) Spezia	Free		
30 June 2026	DF	(England) Ben Godfrey	(Denmark) Brøndby	Free	Option to buy not exercised	
30 June 2026	DF	(Italy) Marco Palestra	(Italy) Cagliari	Free		
30 June 2026	MF	(Ghana) Ibrahim Sulemana	(Italy) Cagliari	Free	Option to buy not exercised	
30 June 2026	FW	(Mali) El Bilal Touré	(Turkey) Beşiktaş	Free	Option to buy not exercised	
30 June 2026	FW	(Italy) Daniel Maldini	(Italy) Lazio	Free	Purchase conditions not met	
30 June 2026	FW	(Serbia) Vanja Vlahović	(Italy) Spezia	Free	Option to buy not exercised	

==== Out ====
Date	Pos.	Player	To	Fee	Notes	Ref.
1 July 2026	GK	(Italy) Francesco Rossi	Retired			
1 July 2026	DF	(Italy) Marco Palestra	(England) Chelsea	€57,000,000	+ €5,000,000 in add-ons	
1 July 2026	MF	(Italy) Marco Brescianini	(Italy) Fiorentina	€10,000,000	From loan to definitive purchase	
4 August 2026	DF	(Italy) Andrea Ceresoli	(Germany) 1. FC Nürnberg	€500,000	From Atalanta U23	
10 August 2026	DF	(Albania) Berat Djimsiti	(Saudi Arabia) Al-Diriyah	€3,000,000		
30 August 2026	MF	(Netherlands) Marten de Roon	(Italy) Roma	Free	+ €650,000 in add-ons	
1 September 2026	GK	(Italy) Paolo Vismara	(Italy) Juve Stabia	Undisclosed		
1 September 2026	DF	(Netherlands) Mitchel Bakker	Unattached	Undisclosed	Contract terminated by mutual consent	
1 September 2026	MF	(Italy) Federico Cassa	(Italy) Bologna	Undisclosed		

==== Loans out ====
Date	Pos.	Player	To	Fee	Notes	Ref.
1 July 2026	DF	(England) Ben Godfrey	(Scotland) Rangers	Free	Option to buy for €4,700,000	
7 August 2026	FW	(Mali) El Bilal Touré	(Italy) Parma	€1,500,000	Obligation to buy for €10,000,000 under certain conditions	
9 August 2026	FW	(Italy) Daniel Maldini	(Italy) Cagliari	€1,000,000	Option to buy for €8,000,000	
10 August 2026	DF	(Italy) Giovanni Bonfanti	(Spain) Las Palmas	Free	Option to buy for €3,500,000	
1 September 2026	DF	(Italy) Honest Ahanor	(England) Crystal Palace	Free	Will join Chelsea on a permanent basis on 1 July 2027 for €46,000,000	
1 September 2026	MF	(Ghana) Ibrahim Sulemana	(Italy) Sassuolo	Free	Option to buy for an undisclosed fee	

==== Loan returns ====
Date	Pos.	Player	To	Fee	Notes	Ref.
30 June 2026	MF	(United States) Yunus Musah	(Italy) Milan	Free	Option to buy not exercised	

=== Winter window ===
==== In ====
Date	Pos.	Player	From	Fee	Notes	Ref.

==== Loans in ====
Date	Pos.	Player	From	Fee	Notes	Ref.

==== Out ====
Date	Pos.	Player	To	Fee	Notes	Ref.

==== Loans out ====
Date	Pos.	Player	To	Fee	Notes	Ref.

== Competitions ==
=== Overall record ===
Competition	First match	Last match	Starting round	Final position	Record							
Competition	First match	Last match	Starting round	Final position	Pld	W	D	L	GF	GA	GD	Win %
Serie A	23 August 2026	30 May 2027	Matchday 1	TBD	11	4	2	5	17	20	−3	36.36
Coppa Italia	26 January 2027	TBD	Round of 16	TBD	0	0	0	0	0	0	+0	—
UEFA Conference League	20 August 2026	TBD	Play-off round	TBD	5	2	2	1	5	4	+1	40.00
Total					16	6	4	6	22	24	−2	37.50

Last updated: 8 November 2026
Source: Soccerway

=== Serie A ===
==== League table ====
Pos	Team	Pld	W	D	L	GF	GA	GD	Pts
10	Genoa	12	5	1	6	13	16	−3	16
11	Cagliari	12	5	1	6	10	17	−7	16
12	Atalanta	12	4	3	5	21	24	−3	15
13	Torino	12	4	2	6	15	18	−3	14
14	Lecce	12	3	1	8	12	25	−13	10

Updated to match(es) played on 22 November 2026. Source: Serie A
Rules for classification: 1) Points; 2) Head-to-head points; 3) Head-to-head goal difference; 4) Goal difference; 5) Goals scored; 6) Drawing of lots.
End-of-season ties on points for 1st or 17th are instead decided by a one- or two-leg play-off, respectively, unless the play-off would involve a UEFA competition finalist (in which case rules 2–6 apply). Rules 2–6 determine home advantage (for 17th, the better-ranked team hosts the second leg); if three or more teams are tied, they also select the two play-off teams.

==== Results summary ====
Overall								Home						Away					
Pld	W	D	L	GF	GA	GD	Pts	W	D	L	GF	GA	GD	W	D	L	GF	GA	GD
12	4	3	5	21	24	−3	15	3	2	2	15	15	0	1	1	3	6	9	−3

Last updated: 22 November 2026.
Source: Serie A

==== Results by round ====
Round	1	2	3	4	5	6	7	8	9	10	11	12	13	14	15	16	17	18	19	20	21	22	23	24	25	26	27	28	29	30	31	32	33	34	35	36	37	38
Ground	H	H	A	H	A	H	A	H	A	H	A	H	A	A	H	H	A	H	A	H	A	H	H	A	H	A	H	A	H	A	A	H	A	H	A	A	H	A
Result	W	W	L	L	L	W	L	D	D	L	W	D																										
Position	6	5	8	11	11	10	11	11	12	13	12	12																										

Updated to match(es) played on 22 November 2026. Source: Serie A
A = Away; H = Home; W = Win; D = Draw; L = Loss

==== Matches ====
The match schedule was released on 5 June 2026.

23 August 2026 1	Atalanta	2–1	Sassuolo	Bergamo
20:45 CEST (UTC+2)	Raspadori 6'; Krstović 65'	Report	Odenthal 55'	Stadium: New Balance Arena; Attendance: 20,828; Referee: Valerio Crezzini

31 August 2026 2	Atalanta	1–0	Bologna	Bergamo
20:45 CEST (UTC+2)	Krstović (yellow card) 73'; Samardžić 90+6'	Report		Stadium: New Balance Arena; Attendance: 21,586; Referee: Daniele Doveri

5 September 2026 3	Roma	2–1	Atalanta	Rome
20:45 CEST (UTC+2)	Hermoso 90'; Soulé 90+3'	Report	Éderson 47'; Bellanova (yellow card) 84'	Stadium: Stadio Olimpico; Attendance: 67,279; Referee: Andrea Colombo

11 September 2026 4	Atalanta	1–2	Cagliari	Bergamo
20:45 CEST (UTC+2)	Scamacca 41'	Report	Mendy 19'; Maldini 61' (pen.)	Stadium: New Balance Arena; Attendance: 21,977; Referee: Alberto Arena

20 September 2026 5	Juventus	2–0	Atalanta	Turin
18:00 CEST (UTC+2)	Conceição (yellow card) 22', (goal) 28'; Bremer 77'	Report	Kristensen (yellow card) 17'; Kessié (yellow card) 43'	Stadium: Juventus Stadium; Attendance: 40,351; Referee: Luca Zufferli

12 October 2026 6	Atalanta	3–1	Venezia	Bergamo
18:30 CEST (UTC+2)	Kessié 4'; Krstović 6', 30'; Elmas (red card) 89'	Report	Moreno (yellow card) 18'; Hainaut 37'; Juan Jesus (yellow card) 42'	Stadium: New Balance Arena; Attendance: 20,923; Referee: Paride Tremolada

18 October 2026 7	Milan	3–2	Atalanta	Milan
18:00 CEST (UTC+2)	Ramos 24' (pen.), (penalty missed) 57'; Rabiot (yellow card) 41', (goal) 43'; Gila 57'	Report	Gaetano 66'; Éderson (yellow card) 69'; Obrić (yellow card) 78'; Krstović 81'	Stadium: San Siro; Attendance: 73,869; Referee: Daniele Chiffi

25 October 2026 8	Atalanta	4–4	Frosinone	Bergamo
15:00 CEST (UTC+2)	Krstović 14', 45'; Éderson 33' (pen.), (yellow card) 69'; Elmas 50'	Report	Schmid 1', 17'; Bracaglia (yellow card) 7'; Kvernadze (yellow card) 28'; Calò 48'; Terzić 82', (yellow card) 85'; Raimondo (yellow card) 90+2'	Stadium: New Balance Arena; Attendance: 21,400; Referee: Livio Marinelli

29 October 2026 9	Fiorentina	2–2	Atalanta	Florence
20:45 CET (UTC+1)	Viery (yellow card) 30'; Pellegrino (yellow card) 51'; Njie 53'; João Mário 61'; Gnonto (yellow card) 75'	Report	Elmas (yellow card) 12'; De Ketelaere 41'; Zalewski 74'; Obrić (yellow card) 83'	Stadium: Stadio Artemio Franchi; Attendance: 20,351; Referee: Federico La Penna

2 November 2026 10	Atalanta	0–3	Parma	Bergamo
20:45 CET (UTC+1)		Report	Fabbian 41'; Zappacosta 47' (o.g.); Lontani 58'	Stadium: New Balance Arena; Attendance: 20,947; Referee: Valerio Crezzini

8 November 2026 11	Monza	0–1	Atalanta	Monza
15:00 CET (UTC+1)	Kouadio (yellow card) 14'; Colombo (yellow card) 48'; Carboni (yellow card) 90+2'; Colpani (yellow card) 90+3'	Report	Krstović 49'; Éderson (yellow card) 85'; De Ketelaere (yellow card) 90+2'	Stadium: Stadio Brianteo; Attendance: 12,158; Referee: Claudio Giuseppe Allegretta

22 November 2026 12	Atalanta	4–4	Internazionale	Bergamo
20:45 CET (UTC+1)	Elmas 35'; Scalvini (yellow card) 60'; De Ketelaere 72', 80'; Zappacosta (yellow card) 74'; Kessié 90+1' (pen.)	Report	Esposito 16', 32', 52'; Sučić 75' (pen.); Carlos Augusto (yellow card) 90+5'	Stadium: New Balance Arena; Referee: Fabio Maresca

30 November 2026 13	Lecce	v	Atalanta	Lecce
18:30 CET (UTC+1)		Report		Stadium: Stadio Via del mare

6 December 2026 14	Lazio	v	Atalanta	Rome
15:00 CET (UTC+1)		Report		Stadium: Stadio Olimpico

14 December 2026 15	Atalanta	v	Genoa	Bergamo
18:30 CET (UTC+1)		Report		Stadium: New Balance Arena

20 December 2026 16	Atalanta	v	Napoli	Bergamo
20:45 CET (UTC+1)		Report		Stadium: New Balance Arena

3 January 2027 17	Udinese	v	Atalanta	Udine
15:00 CET (UTC+1)		Report		Stadium: Stadio Friuli

6 January 2027 18	Atalanta	v	Como	Bergamo
18:00 CET (UTC+1)		Report		Stadium: New Balance Arena

10 January 2027 19	Torino	v	Atalanta	Turin
18:00 CET (UTC+1)		Report		Stadium: Stadio Olimpico Grande Torino

16 January 2027 20	Atalanta	v	Roma	Bergamo
--:-- CET (UTC+1)		Report		Stadium: New Balance Arena

23 January 2027 21	Bologna	v	Atalanta	Bologna
--:-- CET (UTC+1)		Report		Stadium: Stadio Renato Dall'Ara

30 January 2027 22	Atalanta	v	Fiorentina	Bergamo
--:-- CET (UTC+1)		Report		Stadium: New Balance Arena

6 February 2027 23	Atalanta	v	Lazio	Bergamo
--:-- CET (UTC+1)		Report		Stadium: New Balance Arena

13 February 2027 24	Genoa	v	Atalanta	Genoa
--:-- CET (UTC+1)		Report		Stadium: Stadio Luigi Ferraris

20 February 2027 25	Atalanta	v	Monza	Bergamo
--:-- CET (UTC+1)		Report		Stadium: New Balance Arena

27 February 2027 26	Internazionale	v	Atalanta	Milan
--:-- CET (UTC+1)		Report		Stadium: San Siro

6 March 2027 27	Atalanta	v	Torino	Bergamo
--:-- CET (UTC+1)		Report		Stadium: New Balance Arena

13 March 2027 28	Venezia	v	Atalanta	Venice
--:-- CET (UTC+1)		Report		Stadium: Stadio Pier Luigi Penzo

20 March 2027 29	Atalanta	v	Milan	Bergamo
--:-- CET (UTC+1)		Report		Stadium: New Balance Arena

3 April 2027 30	Sassuolo	v	Atalanta	Reggio Emilia
--:-- CEST (UTC+2)		Report		Stadium: Mapei Stadium – Città del Tricolore

10 April 2027 31	Cagliari	v	Atalanta	Cagliari
--:-- CEST (UTC+2)		Report		Stadium: Unipol Domus

17 April 2027 32	Atalanta	v	Udinese	Bergamo
--:-- CEST (UTC+2)		Report		Stadium: New Balance Arena

24 April 2027 33	Parma	v	Atalanta	Parma
--:-- CEST (UTC+2)		Report		Stadium: Stadio Ennio Tardini

1 May 2027 34	Atalanta	v	Juventus	Bergamo
--:-- CEST (UTC+2)		Report		Stadium: New Balance Arena

8 May 2027 35	Frosinone	v	Atalanta	Frosinone
--:-- CEST (UTC+2)		Report		Stadium: Stadio Benito Stirpe

15 May 2027 36	Como	v	Atalanta	Como
--:-- CEST (UTC+2)		Report		Stadium: Stadio Giuseppe Sinigaglia

22 May 2027 37	Atalanta	v	Lecce	Bergamo
--:-- CEST (UTC+2)		Report		Stadium: New Balance Arena

29 May 2027 38	Napoli	v	Atalanta	Naples
--:-- CEST (UTC+2)		Report		Stadium: Stadio Diego Armando Maradona

=== Coppa Italia ===
26 January 2027 Round of 16	Atalanta	v	Udinese	Bergamo
21:00 CET (UTC+1)		Report		Stadium: New Balance Arena

=== UEFA Conference League ===
==== Play-off round ====
The draw for the play-off round was held on 3 August 2026.

20 August 2026 First leg	Atalanta (Italy)	0–0	(Israel) Hapoel Tel Aviv	Bergamo, Italy
20:30 CEST (UTC+2)	Raspadori (yellow card) 48'	Report	Kraev (yellow card) 32'; Altman (yellow card) 54'	Stadium: Stadio di Bergamo; Attendance: 21,061; Referee: Javier Alberola Rojas (Spain)

27 August 2026 Second leg	Hapoel Tel Aviv (Israel)	0–1 (0–1 agg.)	(Italy) Atalanta	Miskolc, Hungary
20:00 CEST (UTC+2)	Falcão (yellow card) 20'; Mayembo (yellow card) 60'; Coco (yellow card) 84'; Turiel (yellow card) 87'; Chico (yellow card) 90+3'	Report	Scamacca 72'	Stadium: Diósgyőri Stadion; Attendance: 5,437; Referee: Daniel Schlager (Germany)
Note: Due to the Gaza war, Israeli teams were required to play their home matches at neutral venues until further notice.

==== League phase ====
The draw for the league phase was held on 28 August 2026.

Pos	Team	Pld	W	D	L	GF	GA	GD	Pts	Qualification
14	(Germany) SC Freiburg	3	2	0	1	4	5	−1	6	Advance to knockout phase play-offs (seeded)
15	(Serbia) Red Star Belgrade	3	1	1	1	6	6	0	4	Advance to knockout phase play-offs (seeded)
16	(Italy) Atalanta	3	1	1	1	4	4	0	4	Advance to knockout phase play-offs (seeded)
17	(Portugal) Braga	3	1	1	1	2	3	−1	4	Advance to knockout phase play-offs (unseeded)
18	(Belgium) Gent	3	1	1	1	1	2	−1	4	Advance to knockout phase play-offs (unseeded)

Updated to match(es) played on 5 November 2026. Source: UEFA
Rules for classification: League phase tiebreakers

Round	1	2	3	4	5	6
Ground	H	A	H	A	A	H
Result	W	L	D			
Position	4	15	16			
Points	3	3	4			

Updated to match(es) played on 5 November 2026. Source: UEFA
A = Away; H = Home; W = Win; D = Draw; L = Loss

15 October 2026 1	Atalanta (Italy)	3–1	(Cyprus) Pafos	Bergamo, Italy
21:00 CEST (UTC+2)	Elmas 1'; Raspadori 18' (pen.); Scamacca 44'	Report	Biel 88'	Stadium: Stadio di Bergamo; Attendance: 18,709; Referee: Adam Ladebäck (Sweden)

22 October 2026 2	Ajax (Netherlands)	2–0	(Italy) Atalanta	Amsterdam, Netherlands
21:00 CEST (UTC+2)	Amrabat (yellow card) 45'; Arokodare 87'; Ter Stegen (yellow card) 90+2'; Ouazane 90+3'	Report	Samardžić (yellow card) 68'; Zalewski (yellow card) 86'	Stadium: Johan Cruyff Arena; Attendance: 51,739; Referee: António Nobre (Portugal)

5 November 2026 3	Atalanta (Italy)	1–1	(Kazakhstan) Kairat	Bergamo, Italy
18:45 CET (UTC+1)	Sulemana (yellow card) 27'; Obrić (yellow card) 39'; Scamacca (yellow card) 57'; Krstović 82'	Report	Mendonça (yellow card) 20'; Gual 53'; Mrynsky (yellow card) 86'; Bekbolat (yellow card) 88'; Jukkola (yellow card) 88'	Stadium: Stadio di Bergamo; Attendance: 18,218; Referee: Julian Weinberger (Austria)

26 November 2026 4	Borac Banja Luka (Bosnia and Herzegovina)	v	(Italy) Atalanta	Banja Luka, Bosnia and Herzegovina
21:00 CET (UTC+1)		Report		Stadium: Banja Luka City Stadium

10 December 2026 5	Riga (Latvia)	v	(Italy) Atalanta	Riga, Latvia
19:45 EET (UTC+2)		Report		Stadium: Skonto Stadium

17 December 2026 6	Atalanta (Italy)	v	(Sweden) Mjällby AIF	Bergamo, Italy
21:00 CET (UTC+1)		Report		Stadium: Stadio di Bergamo

== Statistics ==
=== Appearances and goals ===
No.	Pos	Nat	Player	Total		Serie A		Coppa Italia		Conference League	
No.	Pos	Nat	Player	Apps	Goals	Apps	Goals	Apps	Goals	Apps	Goals
Goalkeepers
22	GK	(Italy) ITA	Thomas Pompei	0	0	0	0	0	0	0	0
29	GK	(Italy) ITA	Marco Carnesecchi	14	0	10	0	0	0	4	0
57	GK	(Italy) ITA	Marco Sportiello	0	0	0	0	0	0	0	0
Defenders
3	DF	(Ivory Coast) CIV	Odilon Kossounou	6	0	4	0	0	0	2	0
4	DF	(Sweden) SWE	Isak Hien	0	0	0	0	0	0	0	0
16	DF	(Italy) ITA	Raoul Bellanova	11	0	7+1	0	0	0	3	0
23	DF	(Bosnia and Herzegovina) BIH	Sead Kolašinac	8	0	4+2	0	0	0	2	0
31	DF	(Denmark) DEN	Thomas Kristensen	8	0	5	0	0	0	2+1	0
40	DF	(Serbia) SRB	Relja Obrić	5	0	3+1	0	0	0	1	0
42	DF	(Italy) ITA	Giorgio Scalvini	11	0	7+2	0	0	0	2	0
47	DF	(Italy) ITA	Lorenzo Bernasconi	11	0	5+3	0	0	0	2+1	0
77	DF	(Italy) ITA	Davide Zappacosta	11	0	7+2	0	0	0	2	0
Midfielders
8	MF	(Croatia) CRO	Mario Pašalić	12	0	4+4	0	0	0	1+3	0
10	MF	(Serbia) SRB	Lazar Samardžić	13	1	4+5	1	0	0	2+2	0
13	MF	(Brazil) BRA	Éderson	14	2	10	2	0	0	3+1	0
17	MF	(Belgium) BEL	Charles De Ketelaere	13	1	9+1	1	0	0	1+2	0
19	MF	(Ivory Coast) CIV	Franck Kessié	4	1	3+1	1	0	0	0	0
41	MF	(Italy) ITA	Javison Idele	2	0	0+1	0	0	0	0+1	0
52	MF	(Italy) ITA	Alberto Manzoni	1	0	0	0	0	0	0+1	0
59	MF	(Poland) POL	Nicola Zalewski	12	1	3+5	1	0	0	4	0
70	MF	(Italy) ITA	Gianluca Gaetano	12	1	5+3	1	0	0	4	0
99	MF	(North Macedonia) MKD	Eljif Elmas	10	2	4+4	1	0	0	2	1
Forwards
7	FW	(Ghana) GHA	Kamaldeen Sulemana	2	0	0+2	0	0	0	0	0
9	FW	(Italy) ITA	Gianluca Scamacca	11	3	4+3	1	0	0	3+1	2
11	FW	(England) ENG	Jonathan Rowe	8	0	6+1	0	0	0	0+1	0
18	FW	(Italy) ITA	Giacomo Raspadori	7	2	2+2	1	0	0	3	1
90	FW	(Montenegro) MNE	Nikola Krstović	13	6	6+4	6	0	0	1+2	0
Players transferred/loaned out during the season
49	MF	(Italy) ITA	Federico Cassa	2	0	0	0	0	0	0+2	0

Last updated: 2 November 2026
Source: Competitions

=== Goalscorers ===
Rank	No.	Pos.	Nat.	Player	Serie A	Coppa Italia	Conference League	Total
1	90	FW	(Montenegro)	Nikola Krstović	7	0	1	8
2	9	FW	(Italy)	Gianluca Scamacca	1	0	2	3
2	17	MF	(Belgium)	Charles De Ketelaere	3	0	0	3
2	99	MF	(North Macedonia)	Eljif Elmas	2	0	1	3
5	13	MF	(Brazil)	Éderson	2	0	0	2
5	18	FW	(Italy)	Giacomo Raspadori	1	0	1	2
5	19	MF	(Ivory Coast)	Franck Kessié	2	0	0	2
8	10	MF	(Serbia)	Lazar Samardžić	1	0	0	1
8	59	MF	(Poland)	Nicola Zalewski	1	0	0	1
8	70	MF	(Italy)	Gianluca Gaetano	1	0	0	1
Own goals					0	0	0	0
Totals					21	0	5	26
