= 2024 UEFA Super Cup =

- Match programme cover
Real Madrid	Atalanta
(Spain)	(Italy)
2	0
- Date: 14 August 2024
- Venue: National Stadium, Warsaw
- Man of the Match: Jude Bellingham (Real Madrid)
- Referee: Sandro Schärer (Switzerland)
- Attendance: 56,042
- Weather: Clear night 25 °C (77 °F); 34% humidity

The 2024 UEFA Super Cup was the 49th edition of the UEFA Super Cup, an annual football match organised by UEFA and contested by the reigning champions of the top two European club competitions, the UEFA Champions League and the UEFA Europa League. It was played at the National Stadium in Warsaw, Poland, on 14 August 2024. It was contested by Spanish club Real Madrid, winners of the 2023–24 UEFA Champions League, and Italian club Atalanta, winners of the 2023–24 UEFA Europa League.

Real Madrid won the match 2–0 for their sixth UEFA Super Cup title. In doing so, they became the most successful club in the competition's history, breaking a three-way tie of five victories each along with Barcelona and Milan.

== Teams ==
Team	Qualification	Previous participations (bold indicates winners)
(Spain) Real Madrid	Winners of the 2023–24 UEFA Champions League	8 (1998, 2000, **2002**, **2014**, **2016**, **2017**, 2018, **2022**)
(Italy) Atalanta	Winners of the 2023–24 UEFA Europa League	None

== Venue ==
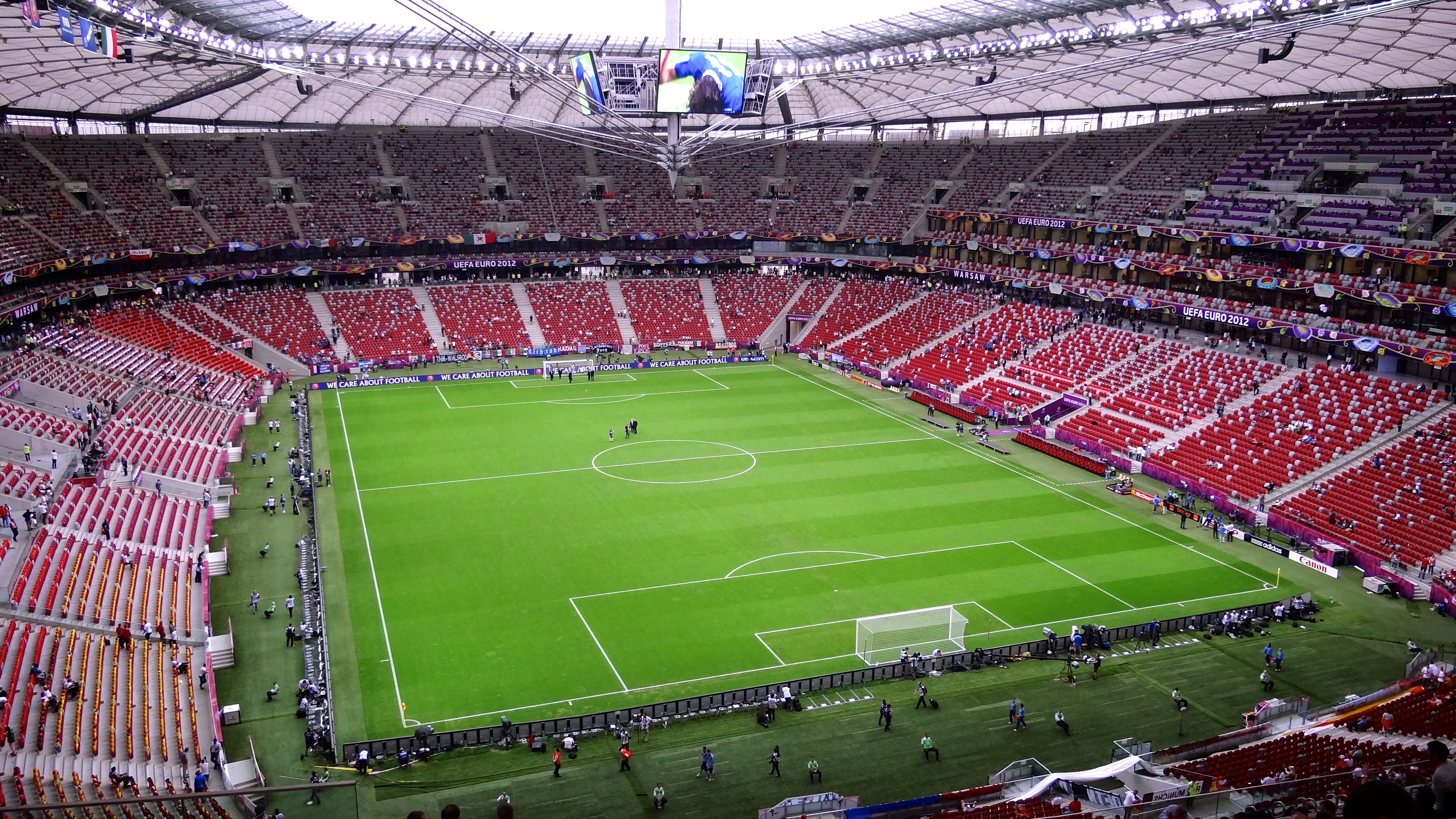
The National Stadium in Warsaw hosted the match.

=== Host selection ===
The National Stadium in Warsaw, Poland, was selected to host the match at the meeting of the UEFA Executive Committee in Limassol, Cyprus, on 26 September 2023. The stadium was built for the UEFA Euro 2012 tournament in Poland and Ukraine, where it hosted three Group A matches, a quarter-final and a semi-final. It has since hosted the 2015 UEFA Europa League final, as well as being the usual venue for home matches of the Poland national football team. It has a UEFA capacity of 58,274 seats.

== Pre-match ==
=== Officials ===
On 26 July 2024, UEFA appointed Swiss official Sandro Schärer as referee for the match. Schärer has been a FIFA referee since 2015. He was joined by compatriots Stéphane De Almeida and Jonas Erni as assistant referees, while Mykola Balakin of Ukraine acted as fourth official. Germany's Bastian Dankert had been selected as the video assistant referee (VAR), with Switzerland's Fedayi San and Dankert's fellow countrymen Christian Dingert serving as the assistant VAR officials.

== Match ==
=== Summary ===
After a goalless first half, in the 59th minute Vinícius Júnior got in on the left and cut-back low from the byline for Federico Valverde to score from close range into an empty net to put Real Madrid into the lead. In the 68th minute, Kylian Mbappé scored on his Real Madrid debut to make it 2–0 when he shot right-footed into the top right corner of the net from twelve yards out after a low pass from Jude Bellingham from the left.

=== Details ===
The Champions League winners were designated as the "home" team for administrative purposes.

14 August 2024
21:00 UTC+2

Real Madrid (Spain)	2–0	(Italy) Atalanta
Valverde 59'; Mbappé 68'	Report

National Stadium, Warsaw
Attendance: 56,042
Referee: Sandro Schärer (Switzerland)

**Real Madrid**	**Atalanta**

GK	1	(Belgium) Thibaut Courtois
RB	2	(Spain) Dani Carvajal (c)		(substituted off) 88'
CB	3	(Brazil) Éder Militão
CB	22	(Germany) Antonio Rüdiger
LB	23	(France) Ferland Mendy
CM	8	(Uruguay) Federico Valverde
CM	14	(France) Aurélien Tchouaméni
RW	11	(Brazil) Rodrygo		(substituted off) 76'
AM	5	(England) Jude Bellingham	(yellow card) 35'	(substituted off) 88'
LW	7	(Brazil) Vinícius Júnior	(yellow card) 42'	(substituted off) 88'
CF	9	(France) Kylian Mbappé		(substituted off) 83'
Substitutes:
GK	13	(Ukraine) Andriy Lunin
GK	26	(Spain) Fran González
DF	18	(Spain) Jesús Vallejo
DF	20	(Spain) Fran García
DF	31	(Spain) Jacobo Ramón
MF	6	(France) Eduardo Camavinga
MF	10	(Croatia) Luka Modrić		(substituted on) 76'
MF	15	(Turkey) Arda Güler		(substituted on) 88'
MF	17	(Spain) Lucas Vázquez		(substituted on) 88'
MF	19	(Spain) Dani Ceballos		(substituted on) 88'
MF	21	(Morocco) Brahim Díaz		(substituted on) 83'
FW	16	(Brazil) Endrick
Manager:
(Italy) Carlo Ancelotti

GK	1	(Argentina) Juan Musso
CB	19	(Albania) Berat Djimsiti	(yellow card) 64'
CB	4	(Sweden) Isak Hien		(substituted off) 90'
CB	23	(Bosnia and Herzegovina) Sead Kolašinac		(substituted off) 71'
RM	77	(Italy) Davide Zappacosta		(substituted off) 62'
CM	15	(Netherlands) Marten de Roon (c)
CM	13	(Brazil) Éderson	(yellow card) 9'
LM	22	(Italy) Matteo Ruggeri
AM	8	(Croatia) Mario Pašalić		(substituted off) 90'
CF	17	(Belgium) Charles De Ketelaere		(substituted off) 62'
CF	11	(Nigeria) Ademola Lookman
Substitutes:
GK	29	(Italy) Marco Carnesecchi
GK	31	(Italy) Francesco Rossi
DF	5	(England) Ben Godfrey		(substituted on) 62'
DF	20	(Netherlands) Mitchel Bakker		(substituted on) 71'
DF	27	(Italy) Marco Palestra		(substituted on) 90'
DF	40	(Italy) Pietro Comi
DF	41	(Italy) Pietro Tornaghi
MF	6	(Ghana) Ibrahim Sulemana
MF	25	(Italy) Federico Cassa
MF	44	(Italy) Alberto Manzoni		(substituted on) 90'
FW	32	(Italy) Mateo Retegui		(substituted on) 62'
FW	45	(Italy) Dominic Vavassori
Manager:
(Italy) Gian Piero Gasperini

Man of the Match:
Jude Bellingham (Real Madrid)

Assistant referees:
Stéphane De Almeida (Switzerland)
Jonas Erni (Switzerland)
Fourth official:
Mykola Balakin (Ukraine)
Video assistant referee:
Bastian Dankert (Germany)
Assistant video assistant referees:
Fedayi San (Switzerland)
Christian Dingert (Germany)

**Match rules**

- 90 minutes
- Penalty shoot-out if scores level
- Maximum of twelve named substitutes
- Maximum of five substitutions
- Maximum of three substitution opportunities

=== Statistics ===
First half
Statistic	Real Madrid	Atalanta
Goals scored	0	0
Total shots	3	2
Shots on target	0	0
Saves	0	0
Ball possession	56%	44%
Corner kicks	1	1
Fouls committed	8	11
Offsides	0	0
Yellow cards	2	1
Red cards	0	0

Second half
Statistic	Real Madrid	Atalanta
Goals scored	2	0
Total shots	10	5
Shots on target	6	1
Saves	1	4
Ball possession	49%	51%
Corner kicks	4	1
Fouls committed	4	8
Offsides	0	1
Yellow cards	0	1
Red cards	0	0

Overall
Statistic	Real Madrid	Atalanta
Goals scored	2	0
Total shots	13	7
Shots on target	6	1
Saves	1	4
Ball possession	53%	47%
Corner kicks	5	2
Fouls committed	12	19
Offsides	0	1
Yellow cards	2	2
Red cards	0	0

== See also ==
- 2024 UEFA Champions League final
- 2024 UEFA Europa League final
- 2024–25 UEFA Champions League
- 2024–25 UEFA Europa League
- 2024–25 Atalanta BC season
- 2024–25 Real Madrid CF season
- Atalanta BC in European football
- Real Madrid CF in international football
