= 2024–25 Atalanta BC season =

Atalanta
2024–25 season
- President: Antonio Percassi
- Head coach: Gian Piero Gasperini
- Stadium: Gewiss Stadium
- Serie A: 3rd
- Coppa Italia: Quarter-finals
- Supercoppa Italiana: Semi-finals
- UEFA Champions League: Knockout phase play-offs
- UEFA Super Cup: Runners-up
- Top goalscorer: League: Mateo Retegui (25); All: Mateo Retegui (28)
- Highest home attendance: 23,249 vs Roma; 12 May 2025, Serie A
- Lowest home attendance: 19,469 vs Sturm Graz; 21 January 2025, UEFA Champions League
- Average home league attendance: 22,675
- Biggest win: List: 6–1 vs Hellas Verona (H) 26 October 2024, Serie A 6–1 vs Young Boys (A) 26 November 2024, UEFA Champions League 6–1 vs Cesena (H) 18 December 2024, Coppa Italia 5–0 vs Sturm Graz (H) 21 January 2025, UEFA Champions League 5–0 vs Hellas Verona (A) 8 February 2025, Serie A 5–0 vs Empoli (A) 23 February 2025, Serie A
- Biggest defeat: 0–4 vs Internazionale (A); 30 August 2024, Serie A
Home colours	Away colours	Third colours

The 2024–25 season was the 118th season in the history of Atalanta BC, and the club's 14th consecutive season in the Italian top flight. In addition to the domestic league, the club participated in the Coppa Italia, Supercoppa Italiana (as runners-up of the 2023–24 Coppa Italia), UEFA Champions League, and made a debut appearance in the UEFA Super Cup (as winners of the 2023–24 UEFA Europa League).

== Players ==
=== First-team squad ===
As of 3 February 2025

Note: Flags indicate national team as defined under FIFA eligibility rules; some limited exceptions apply. Players may hold more than one non-FIFA nationality.

No.	Pos.	Nation	Player
2	DF	ITA	Rafael Tolói (captain)
3	DF	CIV	Odilon Kossounou (on loan from Bayer Leverkusen)
4	DF	SWE	Isak Hien
5	DF	AUT	Stefan Posch (on loan from Bologna)
6	MF	GHA	Ibrahim Sulemana
7	MF	COL	Juan Cuadrado
8	MF	CRO	Mario Pašalić
9	FW	ITA	Gianluca Scamacca
11	FW	NGR	Ademola Lookman
13	MF	BRA	Éderson
15	MF	NED	Marten de Roon (vice-captain)
16	MF	ITA	Raoul Bellanova
17	FW	BEL	Charles De Ketelaere

No.	Pos.	Nation	Player
19	DF	ALB	Berat Djimsiti (3rd captain)
22	MF	ITA	Matteo Ruggeri
23	DF	BIH	Sead Kolašinac
24	MF	SRB	Lazar Samardžić (on loan from Udinese)
27	MF	ITA	Marco Palestra
28	GK	POR	Rui Patrício
29	GK	ITA	Marco Carnesecchi
31	GK	ITA	Francesco Rossi
32	FW	ITA	Mateo Retegui
42	DF	ITA	Giorgio Scalvini
44	MF	ITA	Marco Brescianini (on loan from Frosinone)
70	FW	ITA	Daniel Maldini
77	MF	ITA	Davide Zappacosta

=== Atalanta U23 ===
Note: Flags indicate national team as defined under FIFA eligibility rules; some limited exceptions apply. Players may hold more than one non-FIFA nationality.

No.	Pos.	Nation	Player
25	FW	ITA	Federico Cassa
40	DF	ITA	Pietro Comi
41	DF	ITA	Pietro Tornaghi
43	MF	ITA	Lorenzo Riccio
45	FW	ITA	Dominic Vavassori

No.	Pos.	Nation	Player
46	MF	ITA	Alberto Manzoni
47	MF	ITA	Lorenzo Bernasconi
48	FW	SRB	Vanja Vlahović
49	DF	ITA	Tommaso Del Lungo
50	MF	ITA	Federico Steffanoni

== Transfers ==
=== Summer window ===
==== In ====
Date	Pos.	Player	From	Fee	Notes	Ref.
1 July 2024	FW	(Belgium) Charles De Ketelaere	(Italy) Milan	€22,700,000	Loan transfer made permanent	
1 July 2024	DF	(England) Ben Godfrey	(England) Everton	€12,000,000		
17 July 2024	MF	(Ghana) Ibrahim Sulemana	(Italy) Cagliari	€7,500,000		
8 August 2024	FW	(Italy) Mateo Retegui	(Italy) Genoa	€20,900,000		
22 August 2024	DF	(Italy) Raoul Bellanova	(Italy) Torino	€20,000,000		
26 August 2024	MF	(Colombia) Juan Cuadrado	Unattached	Free		
27 August 2024	GK	(Portugal) Rui Patrício	Unattached	Free		

==== Loans in ====
Date	Pos.	Player	From	Fee	Notes	Ref.
5 July 2024	MF	(Italy) Nicolò Zaniolo	(Turkey) Galatasaray	€3,200,000	Option to buy for €15,000,000 obligation to buy under certain conditions	
16 August 2024	MF	(Italy) Marco Brescianini	(Italy) Frosinone	€2,000,000	Obligation to buy for €10,000,000	
18 August 2024	MF	(Serbia) Lazar Samardžić	(Italy) Udinese	Free	Obligation to buy for €20,000,000	
28 August 2024	DF	(Ivory Coast) Odilon Kossounou	(Germany) Bayer Leverkusen	€5,000,000	Option to buy for €25,000,000	

==== Out ====
Date	Pos.	Player	To	Fee	Notes	Ref.
1 July 2024	DF	(Sweden) Emil Holm	(Italy) Spezia	End of loan		
1 July 2024	FW	(Colombia) Duván Zapata	(Italy) Torino	€8,600,000	Loan transfer made permanent	
1 July 2024	MF	(The Gambia) Ebrima Colley	(Switzerland) Young Boys	€1,650,000	Loan transfer made permanent	
1 July 2024	FW	(Italy) Giuseppe Di Serio	(Italy) Spezia	€1,500,000	Loan transfer made permanent	
9 July 2024	DF	(Italy) Caleb Okoli	(England) Leicester City	€14,000,000		
12 July 2024	FW	(Italy) Nicolò Cambiaghi	(Italy) Bologna	€10,000,000		
17 July 2024	DF	(Italy) Nadir Zortea	(Italy) Cagliari	€5,000,000		
30 July 2024	MF	(Russia) Aleksei Miranchuk	(United States) Atlanta United	€12,000,000		
6 August 2024	DF	(Netherlands) Hans Hateboer	(France) Rennes	€3,000,000		
28 August 2024	MF	(Netherlands) Teun Koopmeiners	(Italy) Juventus	€54,700,000		
30 August 2024	MF	(Ukraine) Viktor Kovalenko	Unattached	Free	Contract terminated	

==== Loans out ====
Date	Pos.	Player	To	Fee	Notes	Ref.
13 July 2024	MF	(Italy) Andrea Oliveri	(Italy) Bari	Free		
17 July 2024	MF	(France) Michel Adopo	(Italy) Atalanta	Free	Option to buy for €4,000,000	
17 July 2024	FW	(Italy) Roberto Piccoli	(Italy) Cagliari	€500,000	Option to buy for €11,600,000	
30 July 2024	GK	(Italy) Pierluigi Gollini	(Italy) Genoa	Free	Option to buy for €2,500,000	
9 August 2024	DF	(Italy) Giovanni Bonfanti	(Italy) Pisa	Free		
23 August 2024	FW	(Mali) El Bilal Touré	(Germany) Stuttgart	€2,500,000	Obligation to buy for €18,000,000 under certain conditions	
27 August 2024	GK	(Argentina) Juan Musso	(Spain) Atlético Madrid	€1,500,000	Obligation to buy for €7,000,000	
30 August 2024	DF	(Netherlands) Mitchel Bakker	(France) Lille	Free		

=== Winter window ===
==== In ====
Date	Pos.	Player	From	Fee	Notes	Ref.
22 January 2025	GK	(Italy) Pierluigi Gollini	(Italy) Genoa	Loan terminated early		
1 February 2025	MF	(Italy) Daniel Maldini	(Italy) Monza	€10,000,000		

==== Loans in ====
Date	Pos.	Player	From	Fee	Notes	Ref.
3 February 2025	DF	(Austria) Stefan Posch	(Italy) Bologna	€1,000,000	Option to buy for €7,000,000	

==== Out ====
Date	Pos.	Player	To	Fee	Notes	Ref.
24 January 2025	GK	(Italy) Pierluigi Gollini	(Italy) Roma	€800,000		
3 February 2025	MF	(Italy) Nicolò Zaniolo	(Turkey) Galatasaray	Loan terminated early		

==== Loans out ====
Date	Pos.	Player	To	Fee	Notes	Ref.
5 January 2025	DF	(England) Ben Godfrey	(England) Ipswich Town	Free		

== Friendlies ==
=== Pre-season ===
27 July 2024 Friendly	AZ (Netherlands)	2–2	(Italy) Atalanta	Alkmaar, Netherlands
15:00 CEST (UTC+2)	Parrott 35'; Goes (yellow card) 51'; Zeefuik 87'; Addai (yellow card)	Report	Wolfe 65' (o.g.); De Ketelaere 70'	Stadium: AFAS Stadion; Attendance: 13,500; Referee: Joey Kooij (Netherlands)

4 August 2024 Friendly	Parma (Italy)	4–1	(Italy) Atalanta	Parma, Italy
18:00 CEST (UTC+2)	Man 6', 51'; Bonny 30'; Partipilo (yellow card) 73', (goal) 78'	Report	Lookman 32'; Éderson (yellow card) 47'; Zappacosta (yellow card) 82'	Stadium: Stadio Ennio Tardini; Attendance: 5,499; Referee: Marco Monaldi

9 August 2024 Friendly	FC St. Pauli (Germany)	3–0	(Italy) Atalanta	Hamburg, Germany
18:30 CEST (UTC+2)	Eggestein 58'; Afolayan 68'; Boukhalfa 71'	Report	Tolói (yellow card) 76'; Sulemana (yellow card) 84'	Stadium: Millerntor-Stadion; Attendance: 26,302; Referee: Harm Osmers (Germany)

== Competitions ==
=== Overall record ===
Competition	First match	Last match	Starting round	Final position	Record							
Competition	First match	Last match	Starting round	Final position	Pld	W	D	L	GF	GA	GD	Win %
Serie A	19 August 2024	25 May 2025	Matchday 1	3rd	38	22	8	8	78	37	+41	57.89
Coppa Italia	18 December 2024	4 February 2025	Round of 16	Quarter-finals	2	1	0	1	6	2	+4	50.00
Supercoppa Italiana	2 January 2025		Semi-finals	Semi-finals	1	0	0	1	0	2	−2	0.00
UEFA Champions League	19 September 2024	18 February 2025	League phase	Knockout phase play-offs	10	4	3	3	22	11	+11	40.00
UEFA Super Cup	14 August 2024		Final	Runners-up	1	0	0	1	0	2	−2	0.00
Total					52	27	11	14	106	54	+52	51.92

Source: Soccerway

=== Serie A ===
==== League table ====
Pos	Team	Pld	W	D	L	GF	GA	GD	Pts	Qualification or relegation
1	Napoli (C)	38	24	10	4	59	27	+32	82	Qualification for the Champions League league phase
2	Inter Milan	38	24	9	5	79	35	+44	81	Qualification for the Champions League league phase
3	Atalanta	38	22	8	8	78	37	+41	74	Qualification for the Champions League league phase
4	Juventus	38	18	16	4	58	35	+23	70	Qualification for the Champions League league phase
5	Roma	38	20	9	9	56	35	+21	69	Qualification for the Europa League league phase

Source: Serie A
Rules for classification: 1) Points; 2) Tiebreaker for Champions team and third relegated team; 3) Head-to-head points; 4) Head-to-head goal difference; 5) Goal difference; 6) Goals scored; 7) Draw.
(Note: Head-to-head record is used only after all the matches between the teams in question have been played)
(C) Champions

==== Results summary ====
Overall								Home						Away					
Pld	W	D	L	GF	GA	GD	Pts	W	D	L	GF	GA	GD	W	D	L	GF	GA	GD
38	22	8	8	78	37	+41	74	9	5	5	36	24	+12	13	3	3	42	13	+29

Source: Serie A

==== Results by round ====
Round	1	2	3	4	5	6	7	8	9	10	11	12	13	14	15	16	17	18	20	19^{1}	21	22	23	24	25	26	27	28	29	30	31	32	33	34	35	36	37	38
Ground	A	A	A	H	H	A	H	A	H	H	A	H	A	A	H	A	H	A	A	H	H	A	H	A	H	A	H	A	H	A	H	H	A	H	A	H	A	H
Result	W	L	L	W	L	D	W	W	W	W	W	W	W	W	W	W	W	D	D	D	L	W	D	W	D	W	D	W	L	L	L	W	W	D	W	W	W	L
Position	1	8	12	9	12	12	8	6	5	3	3	2	2	2	1	1	1	1	3	3	3	3	3	3	3	3	3	3	3	3	3	3	3	3	3	3	3	3

Source: Serie A
A = Away; H = Home; W = Win; D = Draw; L = Loss

^{1} Matchday 19 (vs Juventus) was postponed due to both clubs' participation in the Supercoppa Italiana.

==== Matches ====
The match schedule was released on 4 July 2024.

19 August 2024 1	Lecce	0–4	Atalanta	Lecce
18:30 CEST (UTC+2)		Report	Brescianini 35', 66'; Retegui 45', 57' (pen.); De Roon (yellow card) 60'; Éderson (yellow card) 80'	Stadium: Stadio Via del mare Attendance: 28,719; Referee: Davide Massa

25 August 2024 2	Torino	2–1	Atalanta	Turin
18:30 CEST (UTC+2)	Ilić 31', (yellow card) 40'; Adams 49'; Zapata (yellow card) 89'; Milinković-Savić (yellow card) 90+2'	Report	Retegui 26'; Pašalić (yellow card) 29', (penalty missed) 90+6'; Hien (yellow card) 38'; Djimsiti (yellow card) 77'; Zaniolo (yellow card) 90+7'	Stadium: Stadio Olimpico Grande Torino; Attendance: 20,451; Referee: Antonio Rapuano

30 August 2024 3	Internazionale	4–0	Atalanta	Milan
20:45 CEST (UTC+2)	Djimsiti 3' (o.g.); Barella 10'; Thuram 47', 56'	Report	De Roon (yellow card) 45+1'; Retegui (yellow card) 53'	Stadium: San Siro; Attendance: 71,745; Referee: Matteo Marchetti

15 September 2024 4	Atalanta	3–2	Fiorentina	Bergamo
15:00 CEST (UTC+2)	Retegui 21'; Hien (yellow card) 27'; De Ketelaere 45'; Lookman 45+1'; Zappacosta (yellow card) 82'	Report	Martínez Quarta 15'; Bove (yellow card) 17'; Kean 32'; Mandragora (yellow card) 44'; Richardson (yellow card) 67'	Stadium: Gewiss Stadium; Attendance: 22,705; Referee: Juan Luca Sacchi

24 September 2024 5	Atalanta	2–3	Como	Bergamo
20:45 CEST (UTC+2)	Zappacosta 18'; De Roon (yellow card) 83'; Lookman 90+9' (pen.)	Report	Roberto (yellow card) 11'; Moreno (yellow card) 36'; Strefezza 46'; Kolašinac 54' (o.g.); Fadera 58'; Van Der Brempt (yellow card) 90+1'	Stadium: Gewiss Stadium; Attendance: 22,977; Referee: Paride Tremolada
Note: The match was originally scheduled for 23 September 2024, but was postponed to the following day due to heavy rain.

28 September 2024 6	Bologna	1–1	Atalanta	Bologna
20:45 CEST (UTC+2)	Freuler (yellow card) 1'; Fabbian (yellow card) 35'; Castro 46'; Lucumí (red card) 51'; Skorupski (yellow card) 79'	Report	Bellanova (yellow card) 29'; Kossounou (yellow card) 33'; Éderson (yellow card) 73'; Samardžić 90'	Stadium: Stadio Renato Dall'Ara; Attendance: 27,126; Referee: Antonio Rapuano

5 October 2024 7	Atalanta	5–1	Genoa	Bergamo
18:00 CEST (UTC+2)	Retegui 24', 50', 74' (pen.); Éderson 60'; De Roon 80'	Report	Ekhator 83'	Stadium: Gewiss Stadium; Attendance: 23,138; Referee: Daniele Chiffi

20 October 2024 8	Venezia	0–2	Atalanta	Venice
15:00 CEST (UTC+2)	Busio (yellow card) 90+2'	Report	Pašalić 7'; Éderson (yellow card) 43'; Retegui 47'	Stadium: Stadio Pier Luigi Penzo; Attendance: 11,979; Referee: Luca Zufferli

26 October 2024 9	Atalanta	6–1	Hellas Verona	Bergamo
20:45 CEST (UTC+2)	De Roon 6'; Retegui 9', 58'; De Ketelaere 14'; Lookman 29', 34'	Report	Bradarić (yellow card) 16'; Sarr 42'	Stadium: Gewiss Stadium; Attendance: 23,015; Referee: Ermanno Feliciani

30 October 2024 10	Atalanta	2–0	Monza	Bergamo
20:45 CET (UTC+1)	Djimsiti (yellow card) 54'; Kolašinac (yellow card) 56'; Samardžić 70'; Zappacosta 88'	Report	Maldini (yellow card) 77'; Caldirola (yellow card) 82'; Valoti (yellow card) 90+3'	Stadium: Gewiss Stadium; Attendance: 22,142; Referee: Marco Piccinini

3 November 2024 11	Napoli	0–3	Atalanta	Naples
12:30 CET (UTC+1)	Mazzocchi (yellow card) 90+3'	Report	Lookman 10', 31'; Kolašinac (yellow card) 65'; Retegui 90+2', (yellow card) 90+4'; Djimsiti (yellow card) 90+4'	Stadium: Stadio Diego Armando Maradona; Attendance: 50,873; Referee: Daniele Doveri

10 November 2024 12	Atalanta	2–1	Udinese	Bergamo
12:30 CET (UTC+1)	Pašalić 56'; Touré 60' (o.g.); Lookman (yellow card) 90+1'	Report	Kamara 45+3'; Touré (yellow card) 84'	Stadium: Gewiss Stadium; Attendance: 22,884; Referee: Marco Di Bello

23 November 2024 13	Parma	1–3	Atalanta	Parma
20:45 CET (UTC+1)	Cancellieri 49'	Report	Retegui 4'; Éderson 39'; Lookman 75'; Ruggeri (yellow card) 88'; De Roon (yellow card) 90+3'	Stadium: Stadio Ennio Tardini; Attendance: 18,790; Referee: Ginaluca Manganiello

2 December 2024 14	Roma	0–2	Atalanta	Rome
20:45 CET (UTC+1)	Dybala (yellow card) 53'; El Shaarawy (yellow card) 90+4'	Report	De Roon 69'; Hien (yellow card) 78'; Kolašinac (yellow card) 88'; Zaniolo 89', (yellow card) 90'	Stadium: Stadio Olimpico; Attendance: 55,772; Referee: Marco Guida

6 December 2024 15	Atalanta	2–1	Milan	Bergamo
20:45 CET (UTC+1)	De Ketelaere 12', (yellow card) 55'; Bellanova (yellow card) 71'; Lookman 87'	Report	Morata 22'	Stadium: Gewiss Stadium; Attendance: 22,606; Referee: Federico La Penna

14 December 2024 16	Cagliari	0–1	Atalanta	Cagliari
15:00 CET (UTC+1)	Luperto (yellow card) 43'; Augello (yellow card) 52'; Obert (yellow card) 86'	Report	De Roon (yellow card) 49'; Zaniolo 66', (yellow card) 66'; Samardžić (yellow card) 90+1'	Stadium: Unipol Domus; Attendance: 15,985; Referee: Luca Pairetto

22 December 2024 17	Atalanta	3–2	Empoli	Bergamo
18:00 CET (UTC+1)	Zaniolo (yellow card) 22'; De Ketelaere 34', 86'; Lookman 45+1'	Report	Colombo 13'; Esposito 57' (pen.); Pezzella (yellow card) 64'	Stadium: Gewiss Stadium; Attendance: 22,163; Referee: Ermanno Feliciani

28 December 2024 18	Lazio	1–1	Atalanta	Rome
20:45 CET (UTC+1)	Dele-Bashiru 27'; Hien (yellow card) 34'; Zaccagni (yellow card) 69'; Rovella (yellow card) 90'	Report	Cuadrado (yellow card) 70'; Brescianini 88'; Lookman (yellow card) 90+4'	Stadium: Stadio Olimpico; Attendance: 48,000; Referee: Davide Massa

11 January 2025 20	Udinese	0–0	Atalanta	Udine
15:00 CET (UTC+1)	Lovrić (yellow card) 56'	Report	Scalvini (yellow card) 29'; Kolašinac (yellow card) 47'	Stadium: Stadio Friuli; Attendance: 21,727; Referee: Maurizio Mariani

14 January 2025 19	Atalanta	1–1	Juventus	Bergamo
20:45 CET (UTC+1)	Kolašinac (yellow card) 74'; Retegui 78'	Report	Kalulu 54'; Mbangula (yellow card) 86'	Stadium: Gewiss Stadium; Attendance: 22,920; Referee: Daniele Doveri
Note: The match was originally scheduled for 5 January 2025, but was postponed due to both clubs' participation in the Supercoppa Italiana.

18 January 2025 21	Atalanta	2–3	Napoli	Bergamo
20:45 CET (UTC+1)	Retegui 16'; Lookman 55'; Djimsiti (yellow card) 64'; Ruggeri (yellow card) 66'; Scalvini (yellow card) 76'; Hien (yellow card) 85'	Report	Politano 27'; McTominay 40', (yellow card) 88'; Neres (yellow card) 42'; Lukaku 78'	Stadium: Gewiss Stadium; Attendance: 22,874; Referee: Andrea Colombo

25 January 2025 22	Como	1–2	Atalanta	Como
15:00 CET (UTC+1)	Paz 30'; Jack (yellow card) 66'; Cutrone (yellow card) 90+3'	Report	Lookman (yellow card) 51'; Retegui 56', 70'; Brescianini (yellow card) 88'; Samardžić (yellow card) 90'	Stadium: Stadio Giuseppe Sinigaglia; Attendance: 10,366; Referee: Luca Pairetto

1 February 2025 23	Atalanta	1–1	Torino	Bergamo
18:00 CET (UTC+1)	Djimsiti 35'; Retegui (penalty missed) 74'	Report	Maripán 40'; Coco (yellow card) 45+1'; Tameze (yellow card) 72'; Milinković-Savić (yellow card) 75'	Stadium: Gewiss Stadium; Attendance: 22,547; Referee: Marco Piccinini

8 February 2025 24	Hellas Verona	0–5	Atalanta	Verona
15:00 CET (UTC+1)	Niasse (yellow card) 16'; Ghilardi (yellow card) 42'	Report	Retegui 21', 25', 44', 56'; Éderson 37'; Sulemana (yellow card) 80'	Stadium: Stadio Marcantonio Bentegodi; Attendance: 20,872; Referee: Simone Sozza

15 February 2025 25	Atalanta	0–0	Cagliari	Bergamo
15:00 CET (UTC+1)	Hien (yellow card) 90+5'	Report	Coman (yellow card) 90+5'	Stadium: Gewiss Stadium; Attendance: 21,485; Referee: Matteo Marchetti

23 February 2025 26	Empoli	0–5	Atalanta	Empoli
18:00 CET (UTC+1)		Report	Gyasi 27' (o.g.); Retegui 33'; Lookman 43', 55'; Carnesecchi (yellow card) 67'; Zappacosta 74'	Stadium: Stadio Carlo Castellani; Attendance: 9,176; Referee: Maurizio Mariani

1 March 2025 27	Atalanta	0–0	Venezia	Bergamo
15:00 CET (UTC+1)	Lookman (yellow card) 90+2'	Report	Radu (yellow card) 86'; Pérez (yellow card) 90+2'	Stadium: Gewiss Stadium; Attendance: 21,991; Referee: Giuseppe Collu

9 March 2025 28	Juventus	0–4	Atalanta	Turin
20:45 CET (UTC+1)	Yıldız (yellow card) 44'	Report	Retegui 29' (pen.); Hien (yellow card) 41'; De Roon 46'; Zappacosta 66'; Lookman 77'	Stadium: Juventus Stadium; Attendance: 40,266; Referee: Simone Sozza

16 March 2025 29	Atalanta	0–2	Internazionale	Bergamo
20:45 CET (UTC+1)	Bellanova (yellow card) 39'; Éderson (yellow card) 81' (yellow-red card) 81'	Report	Carlos Augusto 54'; Bastoni (yellow card) 79' (yellow-red card) 90+5'; Pavard (yellow card) 86'; L. Martínez 87'	Stadium: Gewiss Stadium; Attendance: 23,215; Referee: Davide Massa

30 March 2025 30	Fiorentina	1–0	Atalanta	Florence
15:00 CEST (UTC+2)	Kean 45'	Report	Hien (yellow card) 77'; Samardžić (yellow card) 86'; Kolašinac (yellow card) 90+3'	Stadium: Stadio Artemio Franchi; Attendance: 20,409; Referee: Daniele Doveri

6 April 2025 31	Atalanta	0–1	Lazio	Bergamo
18:00 CEST (UTC+2)	Kolašinac (yellow card) 77'	Report	Rovella (yellow card) 40'; Isaksen 54'; Lazzari (yellow card) 88'	Stadium: Gewiss Stadium; Attendance: 22,731; Referee: Daniele Chiffi

13 April 2025 32	Atalanta	2–0	Bologna	Bergamo
12:30 CEST (UTC+2)	Retegui 3', (yellow card) 60'; Hien (yellow card) 7'; Pašalić 21'; Zappacosta (yellow card) 34'; Tolói (yellow card) 66'	Report	Miranda (yellow card) 90+3'	Stadium: Gewiss Stadium; Attendance: 23,156; Referee: Maurizio Mariani

20 April 2025 33	Milan	0–1	Atalanta	Milan
20:45 CEST (UTC+2)		Report	Cuadrado (yellow card) 56'; Éderson 62'	Stadium: San Siro; Attendance: 72,745; Referee: Marco Piccinini

27 April 2025 34	Atalanta	1–1	Lecce	Bergamo
20:45 CEST (UTC+2)	Retegui 69' (pen.); Zappacosta (yellow card) 78'	Report	Karlsson 29' (pen.); Gallo (yellow card) 49'	Stadium: Gewiss Stadium; Attendance: 21,875; Referee: Federico La Penna

4 May 2025 35	Monza	0–4	Atalanta	Monza
15:00 CEST (UTC+2)	Palacios (yellow card) 51'	Report	De Ketelaere 12', 23'; Lookman 47'; Hien (yellow card) 71'; Cuadrado (yellow card) 81'; Brescianini 88'	Stadium: Stadio Brianteo; Attendance: 10,440; Referee: Luca Pairetto

12 May 2025 36	Atalanta	2–1	Roma	Bergamo
20:45 CEST (UTC+2)	Lookman 9'; Sulemana 76'; Djimsiti (yellow card) 90'	Report	Cristante 32'	Stadium: Gewiss Stadium; Attendance: 23,249; Referee: Simone Sozza

17 May 2025 37	Genoa	2–3	Atalanta	Genoa
20:45 CEST (UTC+2)	Pinamonti 37', 58'	Report	Sulemana 47'; Maldini 63'; Retegui 89'	Stadium: Stadio Luigi Ferraris; Attendance: 31,929; Referee: Davide Ghersini

25 May 2025 38	Atalanta	2–3	Parma	Bergamo
20:45 CEST (UTC+2)	Maldini 32', 33'; Djimsiti (yellow card) 47'	Report	Hainaut 49'; Ondrejka 71', 90+1'; Balogh (yellow card) 89'	Stadium: Gewiss Stadium; Attendance: 23,161; Referee: Livio Marinelli

=== Coppa Italia ===
18 December 2024 Round of 16	Atalanta	6–1	Cesena	Bergamo
18:30 CET (UTC+1)	Zappacosta 4'; De Ketelaere 8', 35'; Samardžić 27', 71'; Djimsiti (yellow card) 28'; Tolói (yellow card) 45'; Brescianini 54'	Report	Bastoni (yellow card) 53'; Ceesay 90'	Stadium: Gewiss Stadium; Attendance: 20,234; Referee: Daniele Perenzoni

4 February 2025 Quarter-finals	Atalanta	0–1	Bologna	Bergamo
21:00 CET (UTC+1)	De Roon (yellow card) 90+2'	Report	Holm (yellow card) 67'; Castro 80'; Ndoye (yellow card) 90+2'	Stadium: Gewiss Stadium; Attendance: 20,492; Referee: Livio Marinelli

=== Supercoppa Italiana ===
2 January 2025 Semi-finals	Internazionale	2–0	Atalanta	Riyadh, Saudi Arabia
22:00 SAST (UTC+3)	Dumfries 49', 61'; Carlos Augusto (yellow card) 88'	Report	Scalvini (yellow card) 28'	Stadium: King Saud University Stadium; Attendance: 16,896; Referee: Daniele Chiffi

=== UEFA Champions League ===
==== League phase ====
The draw for the league phase was held on 29 August 2024. The fixture list was announced on 31 August 2024.

Pos	Team	Pld	W	D	L	GF	GA	GD	Pts	Qualification
7	(French Football Federation) Lille	8	5	1	2	17	10	+7	16	Advance to round of 16 (seeded)
8	(The Football Association) Aston Villa	8	5	1	2	13	6	+7	16	Advance to round of 16 (seeded)
9	(Italian Football Federation) Atalanta	8	4	3	1	20	6	+14	15	Advance to knockout phase play-offs (seeded)
10	(German Football Association) Borussia Dortmund	8	5	0	3	22	12	+10	15	Advance to knockout phase play-offs (seeded)
11	(Royal Spanish Football Federation) Real Madrid	8	5	0	3	20	12	+8	15 (Note: Tied on points (15), goal difference (+8), goals scored (20), away goals (6) and wins (5). Ranked on away wins: Real Madrid 2, Bayern Munich 1.)	Advance to knockout phase play-offs (seeded)

Source: UEFA
Rules for classification: League phase tiebreakers
Notes:

Round	1	2	3	4	5	6	7	8
Ground	H	A	H	A	A	H	H	A
Result	D	W	D	W	W	L	W	D
Position	16	11	17	9	5	13	7	9

Source: UEFA
A = Away; H = Home; W = Win; D = Draw; L = Loss

19 September 2024 1	Atalanta (Italy)	0–0	(England) Arsenal	Bergamo, Italy
21:00 CEST (UTC+2)	Éderson (yellow card) 12'; Retegui (penalty missed) 51'	Report		Stadium: Stadio Atleti Azzurri d'Italia; Attendance: 22,858; Referee: Clément Turpin (France)

2 October 2024 2	Shakhtar Donetsk (Ukraine)	0–3	(Italy) Atalanta	Gelsenkirchen, Germany
18:45 CEST (UTC+2)	Ghram (yellow card) 20'	Report	Djimsiti 21'; Lookman 44'; Bellanova 48'; Zaniolo (yellow card) 78'; Éderson (yellow card) 84'	Stadium: Arena AufSchalke; Attendance: 21,636; Referee: João Pinheiro (Portugal)
Note: Due to the Russian invasion of Ukraine, Shakhtar Donetsk were required to play their home matches at neutral venues until further notice.

23 October 2024 3	Atalanta (Italy)	0–0	(Scotland) Celtic	Bergamo, Italy
18:45 CEST (UTC+2)		Report	Johnston (yellow card) 8'	Stadium: Stadio Atleti Azzurri d'Italia; Attendance: 21,614; Referee: Irfan Peljto (Bosnia and Herzegovina)

6 November 2024 4	VfB Stuttgart (Germany)	0–2	(Italy) Atalanta	Stuttgart, Germany
21:00 CET (UTC+1)	Chase (yellow card) 41'; Demirović (yellow card) 69'	Report	Hien (yellow card) 44'; Lookman 51'; Éderson (yellow card) 55'; Bellanova (yellow card) 79'; Zaniolo 88'	Stadium: Neckarstadion; Attendance: 60,000; Referee: Rade Obrenović (Slovenia)

26 November 2024 5	Young Boys (Switzerland)	1–6	(Italy) Atalanta	Bern, Switzerland
21:00 CET (UTC+1)	Ganvoula 11'; Colley (yellow card) 44'; Elia (yellow card) 74'	Report	Retegui 9', 39'; De Ketelaere 28', 56'; Kolašinac 32'; Brescianini (yellow card) 45'; Samardžić 90'	Stadium: Stadion Wankdorf; Attendance: 31,500; Referee: Manfredas Lukjančukas (Lithuania)

10 December 2024 6	Atalanta (Italy)	2–3	(Spain) Real Madrid	Bergamo, Italy
21:00 CET (UTC+1)	De Ketelaere 45+2' (pen.); Lookman 65'; Kossounou (yellow card) 90+2'	Report	Mbappé 10'; Tchouaméni (yellow card) 45+2'; Vinícius 56'; Bellingham 59'; Vázquez (yellow card) 90+3'	Stadium: Stadio Atleti Azzurri d'Italia; Attendance: 22,967; Referee: Szymon Marciniak (Poland)

21 January 2025 7	Atalanta (Italy)	5–0	(Austria) Sturm Graz	Bergamo, Italy
18:45 CET (UTC+1)	Retegui 12'; Samardžić (yellow card) 36'; Pašalić 58'; De Ketelaere 63'; Lookman 90'; Brescianini 90+4'	Report		Stadium: Stadio Atleti Azzurri d'Italia; Attendance: 19,469; Referee: Donatas Rumšas (Lithuania)

29 January 2025 8	Barcelona (Spain)	2–2	(Italy) Atalanta	Barcelona, Spain
21:00 CET (UTC+1)	Yamal 47'; Araújo 72'	Report	Kolašinac (yellow card) 51'; Éderson 67', (yellow card) 90+7'; Pašalić 79', (yellow card) 90+7'; De Roon (yellow card) 90+3'	Stadium: Estadi Olímpic Lluís Companys; Attendance: 42,728; Referee: Michael Oliver (England)
Note: The match was played at the Estadi Olímpic Lluís Companys in Barcelona, instead of Barcelona's regular stadium, the Camp Nou, which was being renovated.

==== Knockout phase ====
===== Knockout phase play-offs =====
The draw for the knockout phase play-offs was held on 31 January 2025.

12 February 2025 First leg	Club Brugge (Belgium)	2–1	(Italy) Atalanta	Bruges, Belgium
18:45 CET (UTC+1)	Jutglà 15'; Nilsson 90+4' (pen.)	Report	Pašalić 41'; Tolói (yellow card) 90+1'; Cuadrado (yellow card) 90+2'; Hien (yellow card) 90+2'	Stadium: Jan Breydel Stadium; Attendance: 24,242; Referee: Halil Umut Meler (Turkey)

18 February 2025 Second leg	Atalanta (Italy)	1–3 (2–5 agg.)	(Belgium) Club Brugge	Bergamo, Italy
21:00 CET (UTC+1)	Kolašinac (yellow card) 11'; Lookman 46', (penalty missed) 61'; Djimsiti (yellow card) 80'; Tolói (red card) 87'; De Roon (yellow card) 87'	Report	Talbi 3', 27'; Onyedika (yellow card) 36'; Jutglà 45+3'; Tzolis (yellow card) 60'; De Cuyper (yellow card) 87'; Nilsson (yellow card) 87'	Stadium: Stadio Atleti Azzurri d'Italia; Attendance: 21,727; Referee: Felix Zwayer (Germany)

=== UEFA Super Cup ===
14 August 2024 Final	Real Madrid (Spain)	2–0	(Italy) Atalanta	Warsaw, Poland
21:00 CEST (UTC+2)	Bellingham (yellow card) 35'; Vinícius (yellow card) 42'; Valverde 59'; Mbappé 68'	Report	Éderson (yellow card) 9'; Djimsiti (yellow card) 64'	Stadium: National Stadium; Attendance: 56,042; Referee: Sandro Schärer (Switzerland)

== Statistics ==
=== Appearances and goals ===
No.	Pos	Nat	Player	Total		Serie A		Coppa Italia		Supercoppa Italiana		Champions League		UEFA Super Cup	
No.	Pos	Nat	Player	Apps	Goals	Apps	Goals	Apps	Goals	Apps	Goals	Apps	Goals	Apps	Goals
Goalkeepers
28	GK	(Portugal) POR	Rui Patrício	6	0	3	0	2	0	0	0	1	0	0	0
29	GK	(Italy) ITA	Marco Carnesecchi	44	0	34	0	0	0	1	0	9	0	0	0
31	GK	(Italy) ITA	Francesco Rossi	1	0	0	0	0+1	0	0	0	0	0	0	0
Defenders
2	DF	(Italy) ITA	Rafael Tolói	17	0	2+9	0	2	0	0	0	2+2	0	0	0
3	DF	(Ivory Coast) CIV	Odilon Kossounou	23	0	12+6	0	0	0	1	0	2+2	0	0	0
4	DF	(Sweden) SWE	Isak Hien	42	0	27+3	0	2	0	1	0	8	0	1	0
5	DF	(Austria) AUT	Stefan Posch	8	0	4+1	0	0+1	0	0	0	1+1	0	0	0
16	DF	(Italy) ITA	Raoul Bellanova	43	1	27+7	0	1	0	0	0	6+2	1	0	0
19	DF	(Albania) ALB	Berat Djimsiti	48	2	33+2	1	2	0	0+1	0	8+1	1	1	0
22	DF	(Italy) ITA	Matteo Ruggeri	37	0	18+11	0	0	0	1	0	3+3	0	1	0
23	DF	(Bosnia and Herzegovina) BIH	Sead Kolašinac	34	1	23	0	0	0	1	0	9	1	1	0
27	DF	(Italy) ITA	Marco Palestra	15	0	2+7	0	1	0	0+1	0	1+2	0	0+1	0
42	DF	(Italy) ITA	Giorgio Scalvini	8	0	4+2	0	0	0	1	0	0+1	0	0	0
77	DF	(Italy) ITA	Davide Zappacosta	43	5	26+4	4	2	1	1	0	8+1	0	1	0
Midfielders
6	MF	(Ghana) GHA	Ibrahim Sulemana	10	2	3+6	2	0+1	0	0	0	0	0	0	0
7	MF	(Colombia) COL	Juan Cuadrado	32	0	7+16	0	0+1	0	0	0	2+6	0	0	0
8	MF	(Croatia) CRO	Mario Pašalić	47	6	23+11	3	2	0	0	0	8+2	3	1	0
13	MF	(Brazil) BRA	Éderson	49	5	32+5	4	1	0	0+1	0	8+1	1	1	0
15	MF	(Netherlands) NED	Marten de Roon	50	4	34+2	4	2	0	1	0	10	0	1	0
17	MF	(Belgium) BEL	Charles De Ketelaere	50	13	25+11	7	2	2	0+1	0	8+2	4	1	0
24	MF	(Serbia) SRB	Lazar Samardžić	42	5	7+24	2	1+1	2	1	0	2+6	1	0	0
25	MF	(Italy) ITA	Federico Cassa	2	0	0+2	0	0	0	0	0	0	0	0	0
44	MF	(Italy) ITA	Marco Brescianini	38	6	9+20	4	0+2	1	1	0	1+5	1	0	0
46	MF	(Italy) ITA	Alberto Manzoni	2	0	0+1	0	0	0	0	0	0	0	0+1	0
48	MF	(Serbia) SRB	Vanja Vlahović	3	0	0+3	0	0	0	0	0	0	0	0	0
70	MF	(Italy) ITA	Daniel Maldini	11	3	2+8	3	0+1	0	0	0	0	0	0	0
Forwards
9	FW	(Italy) ITA	Gianluca Scamacca	1	0	0+1	0	0	0	0	0	0	0	0	0
11	FW	(Nigeria) NGR	Ademola Lookman	40	20	28+3	15	0	0	0+1	0	5+2	5	1	0
32	FW	(Italy) ITA	Mateo Retegui	49	28	32+4	25	2	0	0	0	8+2	3	0+1	0
Players transferred/loaned out during the season
1	GK	(Argentina) ARG	Juan Musso	2	0	1	0	0	0	0	0	0	0	1	0
5	DF	(England) ENG	Ben Godfrey	5	0	0+1	0	0+1	0	0	0	0+2	0	0+1	0
10	MF	(Italy) ITA	Nicolò Zaniolo	23	3	0+14	2	0+1	0	1	0	0+7	1	0	0
20	DF	(Netherlands) NED	Mitchel Bakker	2	0	0+1	0	0	0	0	0	0	0	0+1	0

Source: Competitions

=== Goalscorers ===
Rank	No.	Pos.	Nat.	Player	Serie A	Coppa Italia	Supercoppa Italiana	Champions League	UEFA Super Cup	Total
1	32	FW	(Italy)	Mateo Retegui	25	0	0	3	0	28
2	11	FW	(Nigeria)	Ademola Lookman	15	0	0	5	0	20
3	17	MF	(Belgium)	Charles De Ketelaere	7	2	0	4	0	13
4	8	MF	(Croatia)	Mario Pašalić	3	0	0	3	0	6
4	44	MF	(Italy)	Marco Brescianini	4	1	0	1	0	6
6	13	MF	(Brazil)	Éderson	4	0	0	1	0	5
6	24	MF	(Serbia)	Lazar Samardžić	2	2	0	1	0	5
6	77	DF	(Italy)	Davide Zappacosta	4	1	0	0	0	5
9	15	MF	(Netherlands)	Marten de Roon	4	0	0	0	0	4
10	10	MF	(Italy)	Nicolò Zaniolo	2	0	0	1	0	3
10	70	FW	(Italy)	Daniel Maldini	3	0	0	0	0	3
12	6	MF	(Ghana)	Ibrahim Sulemana	2	0	0	0	0	2
12	19	DF	(Albania)	Berat Djimsiti	1	0	0	1	0	2
14	16	DF	(Italy)	Raoul Bellanova	0	0	0	1	0	1
14	23	DF	(Bosnia and Herzegovina)	Sead Kolašinac	0	0	0	1	0	1
Own goal					2	0	0	0	0	2
Totals					78	6	0	22	0	106
