= Relja Obrić =

Slovenian footballer (born 2006)

Personal information
- Date of birth: 11 April 2006 (age 20)
- Place of birth: Belgrade, Serbia and Montenegro
- Height: 1.94 m (6 ft 4 in)
- Position: Centre-back

Team information
- Current team: Atalanta
- Number: 40

Youth career
- FK Milutinac
- Partizan
- 2023–2025: Atalanta

Senior career*
Years	Team	Apps	(Gls)
2024–2026	Atalanta U23	47	(1)
2026–	Atalanta	4	(0)

International career^{‡}
2021–2022	Slovenia U16	5	(0)
2022–2023	Slovenia U17	12	(1)
2024–2025	Slovenia U19	12	(0)
2025–	Slovenia U21	7	(0)
2026–	Slovenia	1	(0)
- * Club domestic league appearances and goals as of 3 November 2026 ‡ National team caps and goals as of 16 November 2026

Relja Obrić (born 11 April 2006) is a professional footballer who plays as a centre-back for Serie A club Atalanta. Born in Serbia, Obrić represents the Slovenia national team internationally.

== Club career ==
Born in Belgrade, Obrić is a youth product of the Serbian clubs FK Milutinac and Partizan. He moved to the youth academy of the Italian club Atalanta on 31 January 2023 on a two-and-a-half-year contract. In April 2024, Obrić extended his contract with Atalanta until 2028, before being promoted to the Atalanta U23 squad for the 2024–25 season, playing in the third-tier Serie C.

== International career ==
Obrić holds dual Slovenian-Serbian citizenship; he is of Serbian descent through most of his relatives and of Slovenian descent through his maternal grandmother. He opted to play for Slovenia internationally, representing the Slovenia under-17 team at the 2023 UEFA European Under-17 Championship. He also made the final squad for the Slovenia under-21 team at the 2025 UEFA European Under-21 Championship.

He received his first call-up to the Slovenia senior national team in November 2026 for the UEFA Nations League matches against Switzerland and North Macedonia.

== Career statistics ==
=== International ===
As of match played 16 November 2026

Appearances and goals by national team and year
National team	Year	Apps	Goals
Slovenia	2026	1	0
Total		1	0
