= Éderson (footballer, born 1999) =

Brazilian footballer

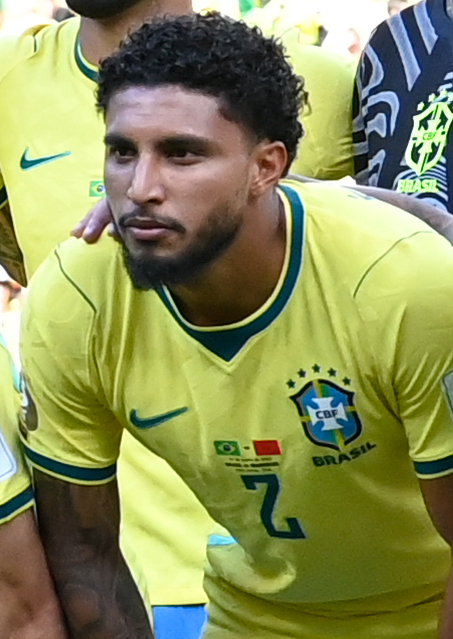
- Éderson with Brazil in 2026

Personal information
- Full name: Éderson José dos Santos Lourenço da Silva
- Date of birth: 7 July 1999 (age 27)
- Place of birth: Campo Grande, Mato Grosso do Sul, Brazil
- Height: 1.83 m (6 ft 0 in)
- Position: Central midfielder

Team information
- Current team: Atalanta
- Number: 13

Youth career
- –2019: Desportivo Brasil
- 2017: → Shandong Luneng (loan)
- 2018–2019: → Cruzeiro (loan)

Senior career*
Years	Team	Apps	(Gls)
2017–2019	Desportivo Brasil	9	(1)
2018–2019	→ Cruzeiro (loan)	5	(0)
2019–2020	Cruzeiro	21	(2)
2020–2022	Corinthians	23	(3)
2021	→ Fortaleza (loan)	40	(2)
2022	Salernitana	15	(2)
2022–	Atalanta	149	(15)

International career^{‡}
2018	Brazil U20	1	(0)
2024–	Brazil	5	(0)
- * Club domestic league appearances and goals as of 23:58, 8 November 2026 (UTC) ‡ National team caps and goals as of 22:17, 5 July 2026 (UTC)

Éderson José dos Santos Lourenço da Silva (born 7 July 1999), simply known as Éderson (Brazilian Portuguese: [ˈɛdeʁsõ(w̃)]), is a Brazilian professional footballer who plays as a central midfielder for Serie A club Atalanta and the Brazil national team.

Éderson began his career in Brazilian football, playing for Desportivo Brasil, Cruzeiro, Corinthians and Fortaleza. He joined Italian club Salernitana in January 2022. Later that year, he signed for Atalanta. He has made more than 150 appearances for Atalanta, and won the UEFA Europa League in 2023–24.

Éderson played youth international football for Brazil at under-20 level, before making his senior international debut in June 2024. He represented Brazil at the 2024 Copa América and 2026 FIFA World Cup.

== Club career ==
=== Early career ===
Born in Campo Grande, Mato Grosso do Sul, Éderson played in the youth academy, and started his professional career, at Desportivo Brasil, a club from São Paulo. He was loaned to Chinese club Shandong Luneng in 2017.

=== Cruzeiro ===
On 15 July 2018, Éderson was loaned to Cruzeiro, a team playing in the Campeonato Brasileiro Série A, that has the option to sign him after the loan ending in mid-2019. At first, the player was expected to be part of Cruzeiro's under-20 team, but after training with the first team for some time, Éderson impressed coach Mano Menezes who decided to give him a chance in the first team.

As Cruzeiro was playing three competitions at once, Menezes was forced to use most of the players in the squad in order of rest some important players for some priority competitions. Due to this fact, many young and reserve players had his chance in the first team. On 5 September 2018, Éderson debuted in a 1–1 draw against Botafogo. He came in the match's 75th minute, replacing Thiago Neves.

Despite Cruzeiro's disastrous campaign in the 2019 Campeonato Brasileiro Série A (which led the team to be relegated to Série B for the first time in its history), Éderson was one of the best players in the team and was considered by many journalists one of the club's few bright spots in the season.

=== Corinthians ===
After Cruzeiro's relegation to Série B, Éderson sued the club for unpaid wages. They reached an agreement allowing him to freely sign with another club. On 20 February 2020, after several days of speculation, Corinthians announced they had signed Éderson for five years.

=== Fortaleza ===
On 20 February 2021, Éderson was loaned to Fortaleza. He debuted with Fortaleza on 10 March of the same year. In Fortaleza, in 2021, he was one of the main players of the club during the Campeonato Brasileiro of that year, helping the club to qualify to the Copa Libertadores of 2022.

=== Salernitana ===
On 30 January 2022, Éderson signed a contract with Salernitana in Italy until 2026. A few months later, on 16 April, he scored his first Serie A goal in a 2–1 away win over Sampdoria.

=== Atalanta ===
On 6 July 2022, Éderson joined fellow Serie A club Atalanta. On 15 January 2023, he netted his first goal for the club in an 8–2 victory over his former club Salernitana. In his second season, he managed to achieve the UEFA Europa League title with the club. On 29 January 2025, he scored his first UEFA Champions League goal in a 2–2 away draw against Barcelona.

== International career ==
On 7 October 2018, Éderson was called up to play for the Brazil under-20 team in two friendly matches against Chile on 13 and 15 October 2018. He played as a starter in the second game, a 2–2 draw.

On 19 May 2024, Éderson received his first call-up to the senior Brazil national team, being included in the squad for the 2024 Copa América. He made his debut on 8 June 2024, in a friendly against Mexico at Kyle Field in Texas, United States. He started the game and played 84 minutes, Brazil won 3–2. Éderson was named in Brazil's preliminary 55-man squad for the 2026 FIFA World Cup, but initially did not make the final 26-man squad. However, on 7 June, he was named in the final squad, replacing right-back Wesley, who suffered a injury the day before in a friendly against Egypt and had to be cut out.

== Style of play ==
Éderson. He is out of this world for his ability to combine running, physicality, technique and intelligence.

— Italian former manager Fabio Capello

Éderson has been described as an all-round midfielder, capable of winning possession and then either passing or carrying the ball forward. Fabio Capello praised his "rare tactical intelligence", while former Corinthians coach Tiago Nunes described him as a box-to-box midfielder rather than a deep-lying playmaker. Nunes highlighted his ability to break through lines, reach the final third and progress the ball up the pitch, as well as his physical strength, capacity to sustain the pace of a match and strong mentality.

Under Gian Piero Gasperini, Éderson was typically used in a two-man midfield within a 3–4–3 system, often alongside players such as Teun Koopmeiners or Marten de Roon. His all-action style of play helped ensure that Atalanta's midfield was rarely overpowered physically. Gasperini's departure the following year altered Éderson's role at Atalanta, but he remained a dynamic midfielder who offered more than a traditional ball-winner, combining strong positional awareness with physicality across his key duties.

== Personal life ==
He has matrilineal roots in the Terena Indigenous people of the Bananal Village in Aquidauana.

== Career statistics ==
=== Club ===
As of match played 22 November 2026

Appearances and goals by club, season and competition
Club	Season	League			State league (Note: Includes Campeonato Paulista Série A3, Campeonato Paulista, Campeonato Cearense)		National cup (Note: Includes Copa do Brasil, Coppa Italia)		Continental		Other		Total	
Club	Season	Division	Apps	Goals	Apps	Goals	Apps	Goals	Apps	Goals	Apps	Goals	Apps	Goals
Desportivo Brasil	2017	Série A3	—		9	1	—		—		—		9	1
Cruzeiro (loan)	2018	Série A	5	0	—		0	0	0	0	—		5	0
Cruzeiro	2019	Série A	21	2	0	0	1	0	0	0	—		22	2
Cruzeiro	Cruzeiro total		26	2	0	0	1	0	0	0	—		27	2
Corinthians	2020	Série A	16	0	7	3	2	0	—		—		25	3
Fortaleza (loan)	2021	Série A	34	1	6	1	10	0	—		7 (Note: Appearances in Copa do Nordeste)	1	57	3
Salernitana	2021–22	Serie A	15	2	—		—		—		—		15	2
Atalanta	2022–23	Serie A	35	1	—		2	0	—		—		37	1
Atalanta	2023–24	Serie A	36	6	—		5	0	12 (Note: Appearances in UEFA Europa League)	1	—		53	7
Atalanta	2024–25	Serie A	37	4	—		1	0	9 (Note: Appearances in UEFA Champions League)	1	2 (Note: One appearance in UEFA Super Cup, one appearance in Supercoppa Italiana)	0	49	5
Atalanta	2025–26	Serie A	30	2	—		2	0	9	1	—		41	3
Atalanta	2026–27	Serie A	12	2	—		0	0	5 (Note: Appearances in UEFA Conference League)	0	—		17	2
Atalanta	Total		150	15	—		10	0	35	3	2	0	197	18
Career total			241	20	22	5	23	0	35	3	9	1	330	29

=== International ===
As of match played 5 July 2026

Appearances and goals by national team and year
National team	Year	Apps	Goals
Brazil	2024	2	0
Brazil	2025	1	0
Brazil	2026	2	0
Total		5	0

== Honours ==
Cruzeiro

- Campeonato Mineiro: 2019

Fortaleza

- Campeonato Cearense: 2021

Atalanta

- UEFA Europa League: 2023–24
- Coppa Italia runner-up: 2023–24
