= Marco Brescianini =

Italian footballer (born 2000)

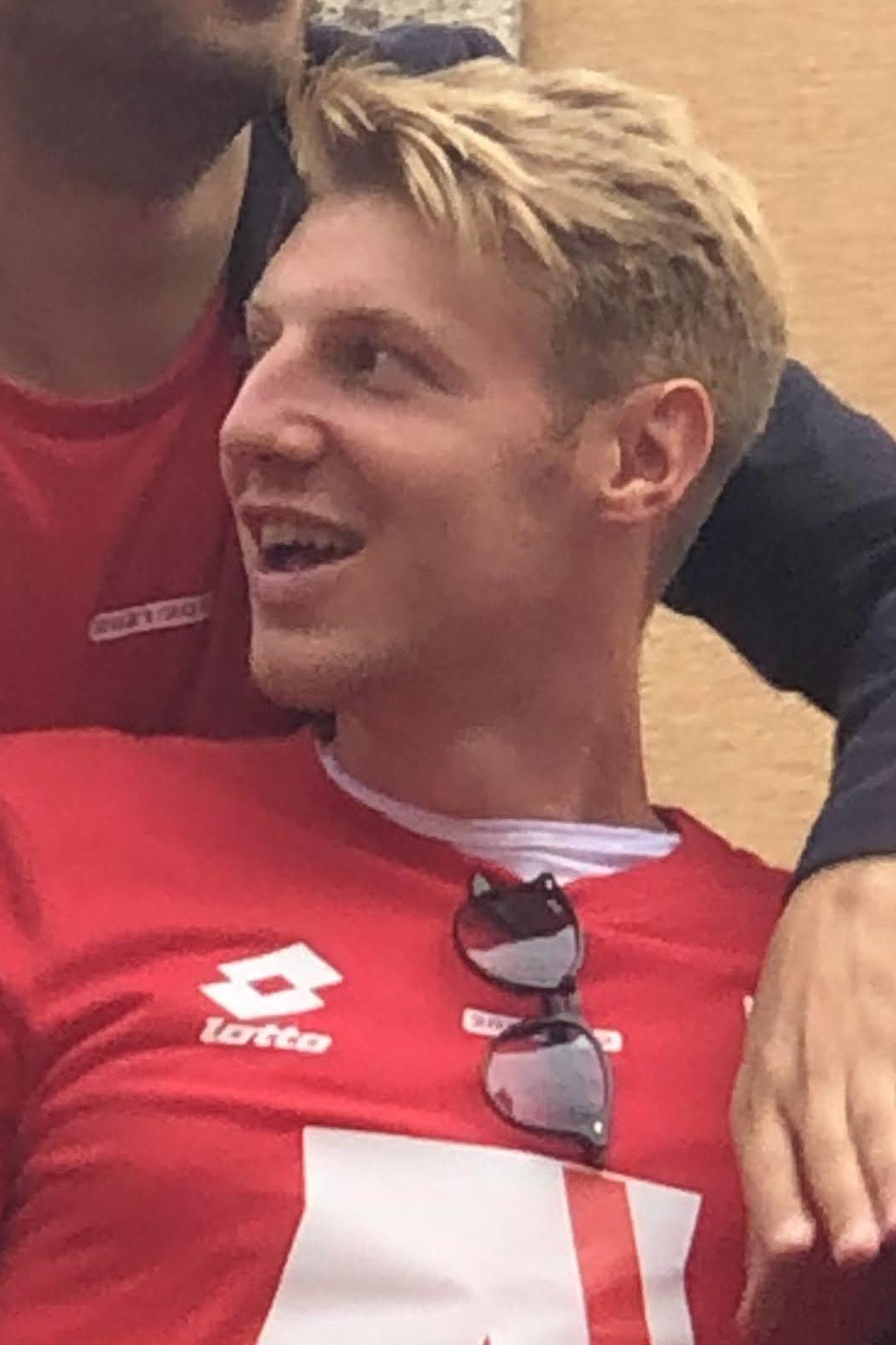
- Brescianini celebrating promotion with Monza in 2022

Personal information
- Date of birth: 20 January 2000 (age 26)
- Place of birth: Calcinate, Italy
- Height: 1.88 m (6 ft 2 in)
- Position: Midfielder

Team information
- Current team: Fiorentina
- Number: 4

Youth career
- AC Milan

Senior career*
Years	Team	Apps	(Gls)
2020–2023	AC Milan	1	(0)
2020–2021	→ Virtus Entella (loan)	29	(2)
2021–2022	→ Monza (loan)	5	(0)
2022–2023	→ Cosenza (loan)	37	(3)
2023–2025	Frosinone	36	(4)
2024–2025	→ Atalanta (loan)	29	(4)
2025–2026	Atalanta	9	(1)
2026	→ Fiorentina (loan)	17	(1)
2026–	Fiorentina	5	(0)

International career^{‡}
2021	Italy U21	1	(0)
2024	Italy	2	(0)
- * Club domestic league appearances and goals as of 17:02, 18 October 2026 (UTC) ‡ National team caps and goals as of 9 September 2024

Marco Brescianini (born 20 January 2000) is an Italian professional footballer who plays as a midfielder for Serie A club Fiorentina.

== Club career ==
=== Early club careers ===
Coming through the youth system, Brescianini made his first team debut for AC Milan aged 20, on 1 August 2020, replacing Ismaël Bennacer after 66 minutes in a 3−0 home win against Cagliari in the Serie A. On 7 July 2023, AC Milan announced that it sold Brescianini to Frosinone.

On 29 August 2020, Brescianini was sent to Serie B club Virtus Entella on loan until 30 June 2021. On 10 June 2021, he joined Serie B club Monza on a one-year loan. He made his debut on 14 August in a 2–1 Coppa Italia defeat against Cittadella in the first round. On 7 August 2022, Brescianini moved on loan again, this time joining Serie B club Cosenza on a one-year loan.

=== Frosinone ===
On 7 July 2023, Brescianini joined newly-promoted Serie A club Frosinone, signing a contract until June 2027. On 29 October, he scored his first goal for Frosinone in a 4–3 away loss against Cagliari. On 2 December 2023, he scored a goal from a free kick against AC Milan, once his parent club, in a 3–1 loss for Frosinone at San Siro.

=== Atalanta ===
On 16 August 2024, Brescianini joined Atalanta on loan, with an option and conditional obligation to buy. On 19 August, he scored two goals in his debut match against Lecce.

==== Loan to Fiorentina ====
On 9 January 2026, Brescianini moved to Fiorentina on loan, with an option to buy and a conditional obligation to buy.

== International career ==
On 7 September 2021, Brescianini debuted with the Italy U21 squad, playing as a substitute in a 1–0 qualifying victory against Montenegro. On 6 September 2024, he debuted for the Italy national team in a Nations League match against France at the Parc des Princes, replacing Federico Dimarco in the 81st minute as Italy won 3–1.

== Career statistics ==
=== Club ===
As of match played 18 October 2026

Appearances and goals by club, season and competition
Club	Season	League			Coppa Italia		Europe		Other		Total	
Club	Season	Division	Apps	Goals	Apps	Goals	Apps	Goals	Apps	Goals	Apps	Goals
AC Milan	2019–20	Serie A	1	0	0	0	—		—		1	0
Virtus Entella (loan)	2020–21	Serie B	29	2	2	0	—		—		31	2
Monza (loan)	2021–22	Serie B	5	0	1	0	—		0	0	6	0
Cosenza (loan)	2022–23	Serie B	37	3	0	0	—		2 (Note: Appearances in Serie B relegation play-offs)	0	39	3
Frosinone	2023–24	Serie A	36	4	4	0	—		—		40	4
Atalanta (loan)	2024–25	Serie A	29	4	2	1	6 (Note: Appearances in UEFA Champions League)	1	1 (Note: Appearance in Supercoppa Italiana)	0	38	6
Atalanta	2025–26	Serie A	9	1	1	0	2	0	—		12	1
Atalanta	Atalanta total		38	5	3	1	8	1	1	0	50	7
Fiorentina (loan)	2025–26	Serie A	17	1	1	0	0	0	—		18	1
Fiorentina	2026–27	Serie A	6	0	1	0	—		—		7	0
Career total			169	15	12	1	8	1	3	0	192	17

=== International ===
As of match played 9 September 2024

Appearances and goals by national team and year
National team	Year	Apps	Goals
Italy	2024	2	0
Total		2	0
