= Federico Cassa =

Italian footballer (born 2006)

Personal information
- Date of birth: 1 February 2006 (age 20)
- Place of birth: Casnate con Bernate, Italy
- Position: Central midfielder

Team information
- Current team: Catanzaro (on loan from Bologna)
- Number: 21

Youth career
- Atalanta

Senior career*
Years	Team	Apps	(Gls)
2024–2026	Atalanta U23	49	(3)
2024–2026	Atalanta	2	(0)
2026–	Bologna	0	(0)
2026–	→ Catanzaro (loan)	0	(0)

International career^{‡}
2024	Italy U19	2	(1)
2026–	Italy U20	2	(0)
2026–	Italy U21	1	(0)
- * Club domestic league appearances and goals as of 1 May 2026 ‡ National team caps and goals as of 25 September 2026

Federico Cassa (born 1 February 2006) is an Italian professional footballer who plays as a central midfielder for Serie B club Catanzaro, on loan from Bologna.

== Club career ==
=== Atalanta ===
Cassa was raised in the Atalanta youth system. He made his professional debut for their reserve squad Atalanta U23 in a Serie C game against Arzignano on 28 April 2024.

Cassa was first called up to Atalanta's senior squad for the 2024 UEFA Super Cup game on 14 August 2024, against Real Madrid, remaining on the bench in the game.

He made his senior Atalanta debut five days later in a Serie A game against Lecce; he was substituted on for Mateo Retegui in the 83rd minute of Atalanta's 4–0 victory.

=== Bologna ===
On 1 September 2026, Cassa was transferred to fellow Serie A club Bologna. Immediately after, he would be loaned to Serie B club Catanzaro for the 2026–27 season.
