= Ibrahim Sulemana (footballer, born 2003) =

Ghanaian footballer

Personal information
- Full name: Ibrahim Sulemana Kakari
- Date of birth: 22 May 2003 (age 23)
- Place of birth: Sunyani, Ghana
- Height: 1.80 m (5 ft 11 in)
- Position: Defensive midfielder

Team information
- Current team: Sassuolo (on loan from Atalanta)
- Number: 55

Youth career
- 2018–2019: Sunyani
- 2019–2021: Atalanta
- 2021–2022: Hellas Verona

Senior career*
Years	Team	Apps	(Gls)
2022–2023	Hellas Verona	17	(0)
2023–2024	Cagliari	21	(2)
2024–	Atalanta	9	(2)
2025–2026	→ Bologna (loan)	3	(0)
2026	→ Cagliari (loan)	16	(1)
2026–	→ Sassuolo (loan)	0	(0)

International career^{‡}
2024–	Ghana	7	(0)
- * Club domestic league appearances and goals as of 25 May 2026 ‡ National team caps and goals as of 27 March 2026

Ibrahim Sulemana Kakari (born 22 May 2003) is a Ghanaian professional footballer who plays as a defensive midfielder for Serie A club Sassuolo, on loan from Atalanta, and the Ghana national team.

== Early life ==
Hailing from Bono in southwestern Ghana, Ibrahim Sulemana started football in his home town of Sunyani. It is also in this city that he was spotted by the Ghanaian player agent, Oliver Artur, who came to organize a day of detection in the region. Selected among several other players, he was invited to a test stay in Italy in the summer of 2019. Enough to catch the eye of Atalanta recruiters, who included him in their U17 group. Sulemana stayed there for two years, the time to participate in several national tournaments, before injuring his face following a bad blow received in a match. Not retained by Atalanta, he finally signed with Hellas Verona in the summer of 2021. The club covered his medical expenses, including his facial surgery, and also allowed him to start with the Primavera. He signed his first professional contract at Hellas on 1 July 2022.

== Club career ==
Sulemana started his career with Serie A side Hellas Verona. On 9 October 2022, he debuted for Verona during a 2–1 loss to Salernitana.

On 1 July 2023, Sulemana signed a four-year contract with Cagliari. On 21 January 2024, he netted his maiden Serie A goal in a 3–1 away defeat against Frosinone.

Sulemana transferred north to Serie A club Atalanta on 17 July 2024. On 12 May 2025, he scored his first goal for Atalanta in a 2–1 victory over Roma, securing his club's third place in the league and qualification to the Champions League.

On 21 January 2026, Sulemana returned to Cagliari on loan. On 1 September 2026, he was loaned to Sassuolo with an option to purchase.

== International career ==
Sulemana made his debut for the Ghana national team on 6 June 2024 in a World Cup qualifier against Mali at the Stade du 26 Mars. He substituted Salis Abdul Samed in the 88th minute, as Ghana scored in added time for a 2–1 victory.

== Career statistics ==
=== Club ===
As of match played 24 May 2026

Appearances and goals by club, season and competition
Club	Season	League			Coppa Italia		Europe		Other		Total	
Club	Season	Division	Apps	Goals	Apps	Goals	Apps	Goals	Apps	Goals	Apps	Goals
Hellas Verona	2022–23	Serie A	17	0	—		—		—		17	0
Cagliari	2023–24	Serie A	21	2	3	0	—		—		24	2
Atalanta	2024–25	Serie A	9	2	1	0	0	0	0	0	10	2
Bologna (loan)	2025–26	Serie A	3	0	1	0	0	0	0	0	4	0
Cagliari (loan)	2025–26	Serie A	16	1	—		—		—		16	1
Career total			66	5	5	0	0	0	0	0	71	5

=== International ===
As of match played 27 March 2026

Appearances and goals by national team and year
National team	Year	Apps	Goals
Ghana	2024	5	0
Ghana	2025	1	0
Ghana	2026	1	0
Total		7	0
