= Alberto Manzoni =

Italian footballer (born 2005)

Personal information
- Date of birth: 25 June 2005 (age 21)
- Place of birth: Treviglio, Italy
- Height: 1.80 m (5 ft 11 in)
- Position: Midfielder

Team information
- Current team: Atalanta U23
- Number: 7

Youth career
- 2014–2024: Atalanta
- 2019–2020: → Giana Erminio (loan)

Senior career*
Years	Team	Apps	(Gls)
2024–	Atalanta	1	(0)
2024–	Atalanta U23	47	(8)

International career^{‡}
2024	Italy U19	1	(0)
2024–	Italy U20	4	(0)
- * Club domestic league appearances and goals as of 1 May 2026 ‡ National team caps and goals as of 19 November 2024

Alberto Manzoni (born 25 June 2005) is an Italian professional footballer who plays as a midfielder for Serie C Group C club Atalanta U23.

== Early life ==
Manzoni was born in Treviglio and moved to France as a 5-year old where he stayed for four years. At the age of 9 he moved back to Italy in Cassano d'Adda, and shortly after joined Atalanta's youth academy.

== Club career ==
Manzoni worked his way up the Atalanta youth academy after joining in 2014, and spent one year on loan with Giana Erminio as an under-15. On 24 October 2023, he signed his first professional contract with Atalanta. On 14 August 2024, he made his professional debut as a substitute in the 2024 UEFA Super Cup, a 2–0 defeat to Real Madrid.

== International career ==
Manzoni is a youth international for Italy, having been called up to the Italy U19 in February 2024.

== Style of play ==
Manzoni is a max box to box midfielder. He started his career as a striker, then as a winger, then moved behind the forwards and as an inside midfielder during his time in the under-15s. He has an eye for scoring goals because of his development.
