= Mateo Retegui =

Footballer (born 1999)

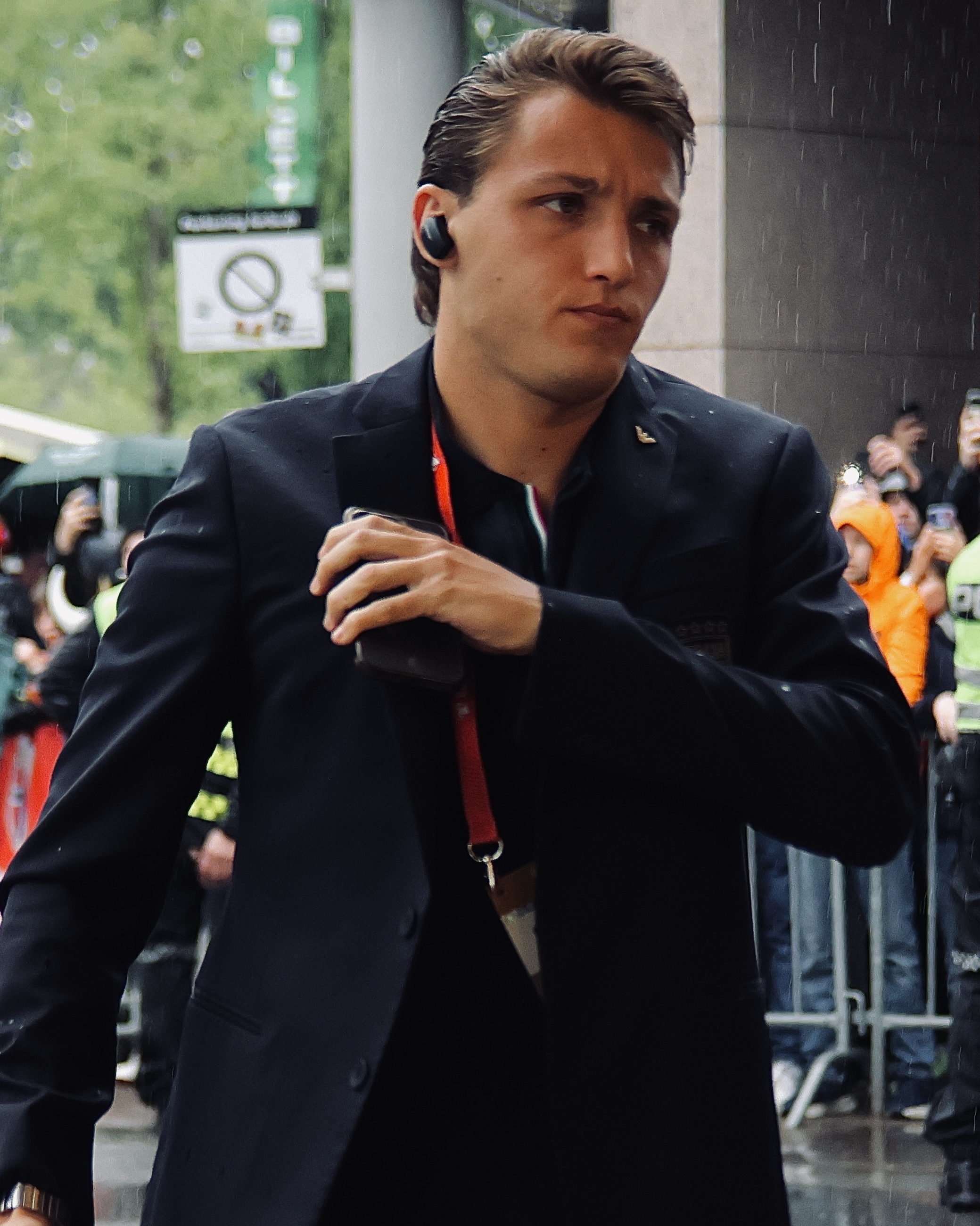
- Retegui with Italy in 2025

Personal information
- Full name: Mateo Retegui
- Date of birth: 29 April 1999 (age 27)
- Place of birth: San Fernando, Argentina
- Height: 1.86 m (6 ft 1 in)
- Position: Striker

Team information
- Current team: Al-Qadsiah
- Number: 32

Youth career
- 2014–2016: River Plate
- 2016–2018: Boca Juniors

Senior career*
Years	Team	Apps	(Gls)
2018–2023	Boca Juniors	1	(0)
2019–2020	→ Estudiantes (loan)	21	(4)
2020–2021	→ Talleres (loan)	24	(4)
2021–2023	→ Tigre (loan)	48	(30)
2023–2024	Genoa	29	(7)
2024–2025	Atalanta	36	(25)
2025–	Al-Qadsiah	39	(23)

International career^{‡}
2018	Argentina U20	5	(0)
2023–	Italy	28	(11)
Medal record
Men's Football
Representing Italy
UEFA Nations League
Third place	2023 Netherlands
- * Club domestic league appearances and goals as of 22:01, 23 October 2026 (UTC) ‡ National team caps and goals as of 31 March 2026

Mateo Retegui (born 29 April 1999) is a professional footballer who plays as a striker for Saudi Pro League club Al-Qadsiah. Born in Argentina, he plays for the Italy national team.

== Early life ==
Retegui was born and raised in Argentina. His maternal grandfather, Angelo Dimarco, emigrated to Argentina from Canicattì, Sicily. His father's grandparents on one side of the family were also Italian, specifically from Genoa, while the paternal ancestors were originally Basque (the surname Retegui being from Gipuzkoa, Spain).

He is the son of former field hockey player Carlos Retegui, who represented Argentina as a player and coach at various Pan American Games and Olympic Games. His sister Micaela is also an Olympian field hockey player.

== Club career ==
=== Early career in Argentina ===
Retegui began his senior career with Boca Juniors, who signed him years prior from River Plate. He was first promoted into the club's first-team by manager Guillermo Barros Schelotto during the 2017–18 Argentine Primera División season, appearing as an unused substitute on occasions against Arsenal de Sarandí and Estudiantes in December 2017. His professional debut arrived on 17 November 2018, with the forward being substituted on for the final moments of a 1–0 home win over Patronato.

January 2019 saw Retegui loaned to Estudiantes for eighteen months. He appeared eight times in 2018–19, before scoring five goals in twenty-one appearances in 2019–20.

In February 2022, Retegui joined Tigre on a loan deal until the end of 2023.

=== Genoa ===
On 26 July 2023, Retegui joined Serie A club Genoa on a five-year deal, for a reported fee of €15 million. On 11 August 2023, he scored his first two goals for the club in a Coppa Italia match against Serie B side Modena.

=== Atalanta ===
Retegui moved to fellow Serie A club Atalanta in a deal worth a reported €28 million on 8 August 2024, following an anterior cruciate ligament injury to Atalanta forward and Italy teammate Gianluca Scamacca. Later that year, on 26 November, he scored his first Champions League goals by netting a brace in a 6–1 away victory over Young Boys. He scored four goals in a 5–0 demolition of Hellas Verona on 8 February 2025, in which he became the first player to score a first-half hat-trick for Atalanta in Serie A. A month later, on 9 March, he scored from the penalty spot in a 4–0 away win over Juventus, handing them their worst home defeat since 1967. He concluded the 2024–25 season as the Capocannoniere, netting 25 goals and becoming only the second Atalanta player to earn the title after Filippo Inzaghi in the 1996–97 campaign.

=== Al-Qadsiah ===
On 21 July 2025, Retegui joined Saudi Pro League club Al-Qadsiah for a reported transfer fee of €65 million. A month later, on 30 August, he marked his league debut with a brace in a 3–1 win over Al-Najma.

== International career ==
Retegui represented Argentina at U19 and U20 level, including for the latter at the 2018 South American Games.

Being eligible to play for Italy through descent, in February 2023 it was reported Retegui was pre-selected by Roberto Mancini to join the Azzurri team for the first UEFA Euro 2024 qualification games. Retegui received his first official call up to the Italy national team on 17 March 2023, and proceeded to score in his international debut on 23 March against England in a Euro 2024 qualifying match lost 2–1 in Naples. He would tally again in his subsequent appearance on 26 March, netting the winner in a 2–0 win over Malta in a Euro 2024 qualifier in Ta' Qali, to become the first player to score in his first two competitive matches for the national side since Pierino Prati accomplished the feat in 1968.

On 21 March 2024, Retegui scored twice in a 2–1 victory over Venezuela. He was the first Genoa player to score a brace for Italy since Virgilio Levratto at the 1928 Summer Olympics. In June 2024, Retegui was included by manager Luciano Spalletti in Italy's squad for UEFA Euro 2024. Later that year, on 6 September, he was named player of the match, in which he also provided an assist, in a 3–1 away win over France during the UEFA Nations League, helping his country to secure their first win against their opponent in Paris since April 1954.

On 14 October 2025, Retegui scored twice in a 3–0 win against Israel during the 2026 World Cup qualifiers.

== Career statistics ==
=== Club ===
As of match played 20 October 2026

Appearances and goals by club, season and competition
Club	Season	League			National cup (Note: Includes Copa Argentina, Coppa Italia, King's Cup)		League cup (Note: Includes Copa de la Liga Profesional)		Continental		Other		Total	
Club	Season	Division	Apps	Goals	Apps	Goals	Apps	Goals	Apps	Goals	Apps	Goals	Apps	Goals
Boca Juniors	2017–18	Argentine Primera División	0	0	0	0	—		0	0	0	0	0	0
Boca Juniors	2018–19	Argentine Primera División	1	0	0	0	—		0	0	0	0	1	0
Boca Juniors	Total		1	0	0	0	0	0	0	0	0	0	1	0
Estudiantes (loan)	2018–19	Argentine Primera División	3	0	1	0	—		—		4 (Note: Appearances in Copa de la Superliga)	0	8	0
Estudiantes (loan)	2019–20	Argentine Primera División	18	4	3	1	—		—		—		21	5
Estudiantes (loan)	Total		21	4	4	1	0	0	0	0	0	0	29	5
Talleres (loan)	2020	—	—		2	0	11	1	—		—		13	1
Talleres (loan)	2021	Argentine Primera División	24	4	4	0	14	2	6 (Note: Appearances in Copa Sudamericana)	0	—		48	6
Talleres (loan)	Total		24	4	6	0	25	3	6	0	0	0	61	7
Tigre (loan)	2022	Argentine Primera División	27	19	1	0	13	3	—		1 (Note: Appearance in Trofeo de Campeones)	1	42	23
Tigre (loan)	2023	Argentine Primera División	21	11	1	0	—		6	1	—		28	12
Tigre (loan)	Total		48	30	2	0	13	3	6	1	1	1	70	35
Genoa	2023–24	Serie A	29	7	2	2	—		—		—		31	9
Atalanta	2024–25	Serie A	36	25	2	0	—		10 (Note: Appearances in UEFA Champions League)	3	1 (Note: Appearance in UEFA Super Cup)	0	49	28
Al-Qadsiah	2025–26	Saudi Pro League	28	16	2	3	—		—		1 (Note: Appearance in Saudi Super Cup)	0	31	19
Al-Qadsiah	2026–27	Saudi Pro League	10	6	1	2	—		2 (Note: Appearances in AFC Champions League Elite)	1	0	0	13	9
Al-Qadsiah	Total		38	22	3	5	—		2	1	1	0	44	28
Career total			197	91	19	8	38	6	24	5	7	1	285	112

=== International ===
As of match played 31 March 2026

Appearances and goals by national team and year
National team	Year	Apps	Goals
Italy	2023	4	2
Italy	2024	14	4
Italy	2025	8	5
Italy	2026	2	0
Total		28	11

Italy score listed first, score column indicates score after each Retegui goal.

List of international goals scored by Mateo Retegui
No.	Date	Venue	Cap	Opponent	Score	Result	Competition	Ref.
1	23 March 2023	Stadio Diego Armando Maradona, Naples, Italy	1	England	1–2	1–2	UEFA Euro 2024 qualifying	
2	26 March 2023	National Stadium, Attard, Malta	2	Malta	1–0	2–0	UEFA Euro 2024 qualifying	
3	21 March 2024	Chase Stadium, Fort Lauderdale, United States	5	Venezuela	1–0	2–1	Friendly	
4	21 March 2024	Chase Stadium, Fort Lauderdale, United States	5	Venezuela	2–1	2–1	Friendly	
5	10 October 2024	Stadio Olimpico, Rome, Italy	15	Belgium	2–0	2–2	2024–25 UEFA Nations League A	
6	14 October 2024	Stadio Friuli, Udine, Italy	16	Israel	1–0	4–1	2024–25 UEFA Nations League A	
7	5 September 2025	Stadio Atleti Azzurri d'Italia, Bergamo, Italy	21	Estonia	2–0	5–0	2026 FIFA World Cup qualification	
8	5 September 2025	Stadio Atleti Azzurri d'Italia, Bergamo, Italy	21	Estonia	4–0	5–0	2026 FIFA World Cup qualification	
9	11 October 2025	A. Le Coq Arena, Tallinn, Estonia	23	Estonia	2–0	3–1	2026 FIFA World Cup qualification	
10	14 October 2025	Stadio Friuli, Udine, Italy	24	Israel	1–0	3–0	2026 FIFA World Cup qualification	
11	14 October 2025	Stadio Friuli, Udine, Italy	24	Israel	2–0	3–0	2026 FIFA World Cup qualification	

== Honours ==
Individual

- Argentine Primera División top scorer: 2022
- Serie A Player of the Month: October 2024
- Capocannoniere: 2024–25
- Serie A Best Striker: 2024–25
- Serie A Team of the Season: 2024–25
- Serie A Team of the Year: 2024–25
