= Davide Zappacosta =

Italian footballer (born 1992)

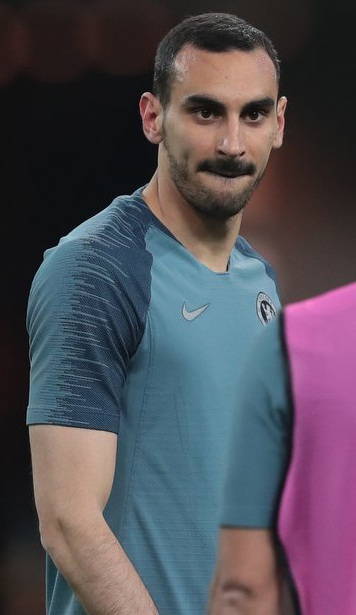
- Zappacosta with Chelsea in 2019

Personal information
- Full name: Davide Zappacosta
- Date of birth: 11 June 1992 (age 34)
- Place of birth: Sora, Italy
- Height: 1.82 m (6 ft 0 in)
- Positions: Right-back; wing-back

Team information
- Current team: Atalanta
- Number: 77

Youth career
- 1998–2008: Sora
- 2008–2010: Isola Liri

Senior career*
Years	Team	Apps	(Gls)
2010–2011	Isola Liri	14	(1)
2011–2012	Atalanta	0	(0)
2011–2012	→ Avellino (loan)	27	(0)
2012–2014	Avellino	58	(3)
2014–2015	Atalanta	29	(3)
2015–2017	Torino	56	(2)
2017–2021	Chelsea	26	(1)
2019–2020	→ Roma (loan)	9	(0)
2020–2021	→ Genoa (loan)	25	(4)
2021–	Atalanta	151	(14)

International career^{‡}
2013–2015	Italy U21	17	(0)
2016–	Italy	14	(0)
- * Club domestic league appearances and goals as of 23:14, 22 May 2026 (UTC) ‡ National team caps and goals as of 18 October 2026

Davide Zappacosta (born 11 June 1992) is an Italian professional footballer who plays as a right-back or wing-back for Serie A club Atalanta and the Italy national team.

== Club career ==
=== Early career ===
Born in Sora, Lazio, Zappacosta joined his hometown Sora's youth setup in 1998 aged six, as a forward. In the 2006–07 season, he played in Sora's under-15 team in the Lazio Region Giovanissimi League. In 2008, he moved to neighbouring Isola Liri, appearing in the Campionato Nazionale Dante Berretti under-20's, and made his senior debut for the side in the 2009–10 campaign, obtaining a total of 14 caps and a goal in the league.

=== Atalanta ===
In January 2011 Zappacosta joined Atalanta in a co-ownership deal for a €60,000 transfer fee. He played for the Primavera for six months. He appeared during the pre-season with the main squad.

=== Avellino ===
On 31 August 2011, at age 19, he was signed by Avellino initially in a temporary deal. The loan was turned into a co-ownership deal for a €40,000 fee in 2012, after Atalanta bought him outright from Isola Liri for an undisclosed amount.

He played 3 seasons for Avellino, the first two in Lega Pro Prima Divisione, winning the championship of Group B of the third tier in the 2012–13 season as well as being crowned the grand champions after beating Trapani in Group A. After promotion to Serie B he decided to get a tattoo of the date "05.05.2013". The following year he scored a debut goal in Serie B in the 2–1 win against Novara, standing out as one of the best full backs in the league.

=== Return to Atalanta ===
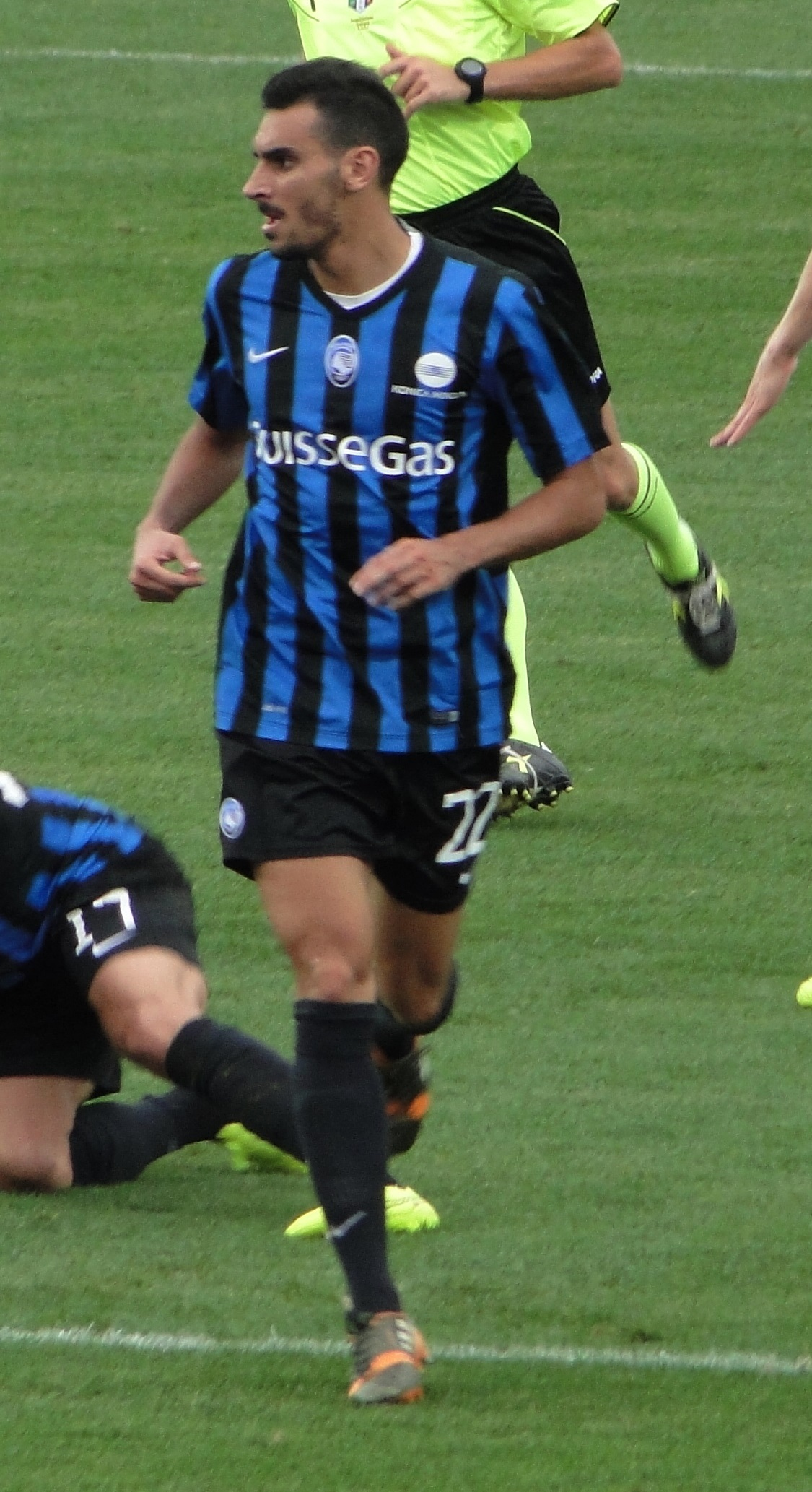
Zappacosta playing for Atalanta in 2014

On 4 June 2014, Zappacosta returned to Atalanta for €900,000 fee, signing a four-year deal. He made his official debut with Atalanta on 23 August 2014 against Pisa in a 2–0 win in the third qualifying round of the Coppa Italia. On 31 August 2014 Zappacosta made his debut in Serie A, starting in a 0–0 home draw against Hellas Verona. On 6 January 2015 he scored his first Serie A goal in the 37th minute of a 2–2 draw to Genoa. On 11 January, one week later, he scored his second goal in the 72nd minute of a 1–1 home draw against Chievo Verona. On 8 February, Zappacosta scored his third goal of the season in the 9th minute of a 3–2 away defeat against Fiorentina. He finished the 2014–15 season at Atalanta with 30 appearances, three goals and one assist.

=== Torino ===
On 10 July 2015 he was sold to Torino, in the same transfer that brought the midfielder Daniele Baselli to Piedmont, for a total of €10 million transfer fee. On 20 September, Zappacosta made his debut for Torino as a substitute replacing Bruno Peres in the 76th minute of a 2–0 home win over Sampdoria. He scored his first goal for the club on 28 October during a 3–3 draw at home to Genoa. Zappacosta finished his first season at Torino with 26 appearances, one goal and one assist, and his second with 29 appearances, one goal and five assists.

=== Chelsea ===
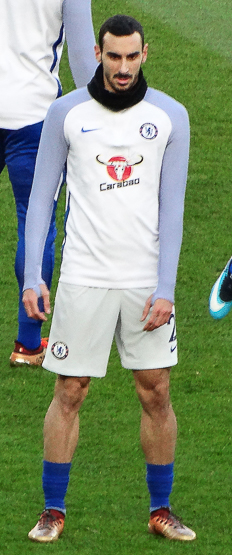
Zappacosta training with Chelsea in 2017

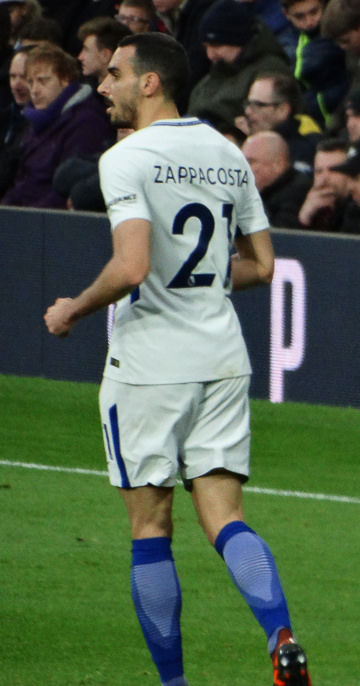
Zappacosta playing for Chelsea in 2017

On 31 August 2017, he was sold to Chelsea for a reported fee of €28 million plus bonuses. He signed a four-year deal at Stamford Bridge. The transfer was completed minutes before the transfer window shut on deadline day. Zappacosta made his debut for Chelsea on 9 September as a substitute replacing Victor Moses in the 74th minute of a 2–1 away win against Leicester City. He made his Champions League debut and scored his first goal for Chelsea on 12 September 2017, in a 6–0 home win against Qarabağ FK. With this goal, Zappacosta became the 100th Italian player to score a goal in the Champions League. His first Premier League goal came from outside the box in a 5–0 home win against Stoke City on 30 December 2017. At the end of the season he was an unused substitute in a Chelsea win against Manchester United in the 2018 FA Cup Final.

On 29 May 2019, Zappacosta appeared in Chelsea's 4–1 victory over Arsenal in the 2019 UEFA Europa League Final, coming on as a late substitute for Eden Hazard.

==== Roma (loan) ====
On 21 August 2019, Zappacosta signed a one-year extension to his contract at Chelsea and then joined Roma on an initial six-month loan deal with an option to extend the loan until the end of the 2019–20 season. On 4 October 2019, Zappacosta suffered an anterior cruciate ligament injury during training.

==== Genoa (loan) ====
On 19 September 2020, Zappacosta returned to Italy with Genoa on loan until the end of 2020–21 season. One day later, on 20 September, he scored a goal in his league debut as Genoa beat Crotone 4–1 at home.

=== Second return to Atalanta ===
On 24 August 2021, Zappacosta returned to Bergamo to sign with Atalanta on a permanent basis for his third spell at the club. He carried out his medical and signed on a four-year contract the following day, reportedly signing from Chelsea for a fee of around €10 million, plus add ons. He scored his first goal in a 2–1 home win against Sassuolo in September.

On 22 May 2024, Zappacosta started in Atalanta's 3–0 victory over Bayer Leverkusen in the 2024 Europa League final at the Dublin Arena, setting up Ademola Lookman's opening goal of the match.

== International career ==
During his period in Irpinia, he made his debut with the Italy under-21 on 5 September 2013 in a 2015 UEFA European Under-21 Championship qualifier match against Belgium, losing 3–1. He also received a call-up from Italy under-21 Serie B representative team against a team of free agent that was trained in a camp held by Italian Footballers' Association, in August 2013.

He took part in the 2015 UEFA European Under-21 Championship in the Czech Republic, playing as a starter in the right full-back position in all three of Italy's games, who were eliminated in the group stage.

In May 2016, Zappacosta was called up to the senior national team by coach Antonio Conte in preparation for the UEFA Euro 2016. He was subsequently included in the list of 30 provisional players for the tournament. On 31 May, he was named one of three reserves for the senior side for Euro 2016.

He made his international debut for Italy on 12 November 2016, against Liechtenstein in a 2018 World Cup qualifying match, starting the match as a right back.

== Career statistics ==
=== Club ===
As of match played 22 May 2026

Appearances and goals by club, season and competition
Club	Season	League			National cup (Note: Includes Coppa Italia, FA Cup)		League cup (Note: Includes EFL Cup)		Europe		Other		Total	
Club	Season	Division	Apps	Goals	Apps	Goals	Apps	Goals	Apps	Goals	Apps	Goals	Apps	Goals
Isola Liri	2009–10	Lega Pro Seconda Divisione	2	0	0	0	—		—		—		2	0
Isola Liri	2010–11	Lega Pro Seconda Divisione	12	1	0	0	—		—		—		12	1
Isola Liri	Total		14	1	0	0	—		—		—		14	1
Atalanta	2011–12	Serie A	0	0	0	0	—		—		—		0	0
Avellino (loan)	2011–12	Lega Pro Prima Divisione	27	0	0	0	—		—		—		27	0
Avellino	2012–13	Lega Pro Prima Divisione	26	1	1	0	—		—		—		27	1
Avellino	2013–14	Serie B	32	2	4	0	—		—		—		36	2
Avellino	Total		58	3	5	0	—		—		—		63	3
Atalanta	2014–15	Serie A	29	3	1	0	—		—		—		30	3
Torino	2015–16	Serie A	25	1	1	0	—		—		—		26	1
Torino	2016–17	Serie A	29	1	0	0	—		—		—		29	1
Torino	2017–18	Serie A	2	0	1	0	—		—		—		3	0
Torino	Total		56	2	2	0	—		—		—		58	2
Chelsea	2017–18	Premier League	22	1	4	0	4	0	5 (Note: Appearances in UEFA Champions League)	1	—		35	2
Chelsea	2018–19	Premier League	4	0	2	0	1	0	10 (Note: Appearances in UEFA Europa League)	0	0	0	17	0
Chelsea	2019–20	Premier League	0	0	—		—		—		0	0	0	0
Chelsea	2020–21	Premier League	0	0	—		—		—		—		0	0
Chelsea	Total		26	1	6	0	5	0	15	1	0	0	52	2
Roma (loan)	2019–20	Serie A	9	0	0	0	—		0	0	—		9	0
Genoa (loan)	2020–21	Serie A	25	4	0	0	—		—		—		25	4
Atalanta	2021–22	Serie A	34	1	1	1	—		10 (Note: Six appearances in UEFA Champions League, four appearances in UEFA Europa League)	0	—		45	2
Atalanta	2022–23	Serie A	21	4	0	0	—		—		—		21	4
Atalanta	2023–24	Serie A	31	2	4	0	—		11	0	—		46	2
Atalanta	2024–25	Serie A	30	4	2	1	—		9	0	2 (Note: One appearance in UEFA Super Cup, one appearance in Supercoppa Italiana)	0	43	5
Atalanta	2025–26	Serie A	35	3	3	0	—		10	1	—		48	4
Atalanta	Total		151	14	10	2	—		40	1	2	0	203	17
Career total			395	28	24	2	5	0	55	2	2	0	481	32

=== International ===
As of match played 6 June 2025

Appearances and goals by national team and year
National team	Year	Apps	Goals
Italy	2016	2	0
Italy	2017	5	0
Italy	2018	6	0
Italy	2019	0	0
Italy	2020	0	0
Italy	2021	0	0
Italy	2022	0	0
Italy	2023	0	0
Italy	2024	0	0
Italy	2025	1	0
Total		14	0

== Honours ==
Avellino

- Lega Pro Prima Divisione: 2012–13

Chelsea

- FA Cup: 2017–18
- UEFA Europa League: 2018–19

Atalanta

- UEFA Europa League: 2023–24
