= Ben Godfrey =

English footballer (born 1998)

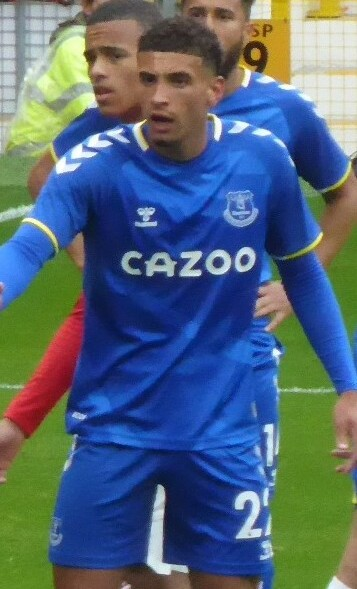
- Godfrey playing for Everton in 2021

Personal information
- Full name: Benjamin Matthew Godfrey
- Date of birth: 15 January 1998 (age 28)
- Place of birth: York, North Yorkshire, England
- Height: 1.85 m (6 ft 1 in)
- Position: Centre-back

Team information
- Current team: Rangers (on loan from Atalanta)
- Number: 4

Youth career
- York City
- 2011–2013: Middlesbrough
- 2013–2014: York City

Senior career*
Years	Team	Apps	(Gls)
2014–2016	York City	12	(1)
2016–2020	Norwich City	66	(4)
2017–2018	→ Shrewsbury Town (loan)	40	(1)
2020–2024	Everton	82	(0)
2024–	Atalanta	1	(0)
2025	→ Ipswich Town (loan)	3	(0)
2025–2026	→ Sheffield United (loan)	4	(0)
2026	→ Brøndby (loan)	12	(1)
2026–	→ Rangers (loan)	4	(0)

International career
2019	England U20	2	(0)
2019–2021	England U21	9	(1)
2021	England	2	(0)
- * Club domestic league appearances and goals as of 21:18, 14 May 2026 (UTC)

Benjamin Matthew Godfrey (born 15 January 1998) is an English professional footballer who plays as a centre-back for Scottish Premiership club Rangers, on loan from Serie A club Atalanta.

Godfrey has represented England from youth to senior level, debuting for the latter in June 2021.

== Early and personal life ==
Benjamin Matthew Godfrey was born on 15 January 1998 in York, North Yorkshire, England. When young, he attended Archbishop Holgate's School. His father, Alex Godfrey, is a retired professional rugby league footballer. Godfrey is of Jamaican descent through his paternal grandfather.

== Club career ==
=== Early career ===
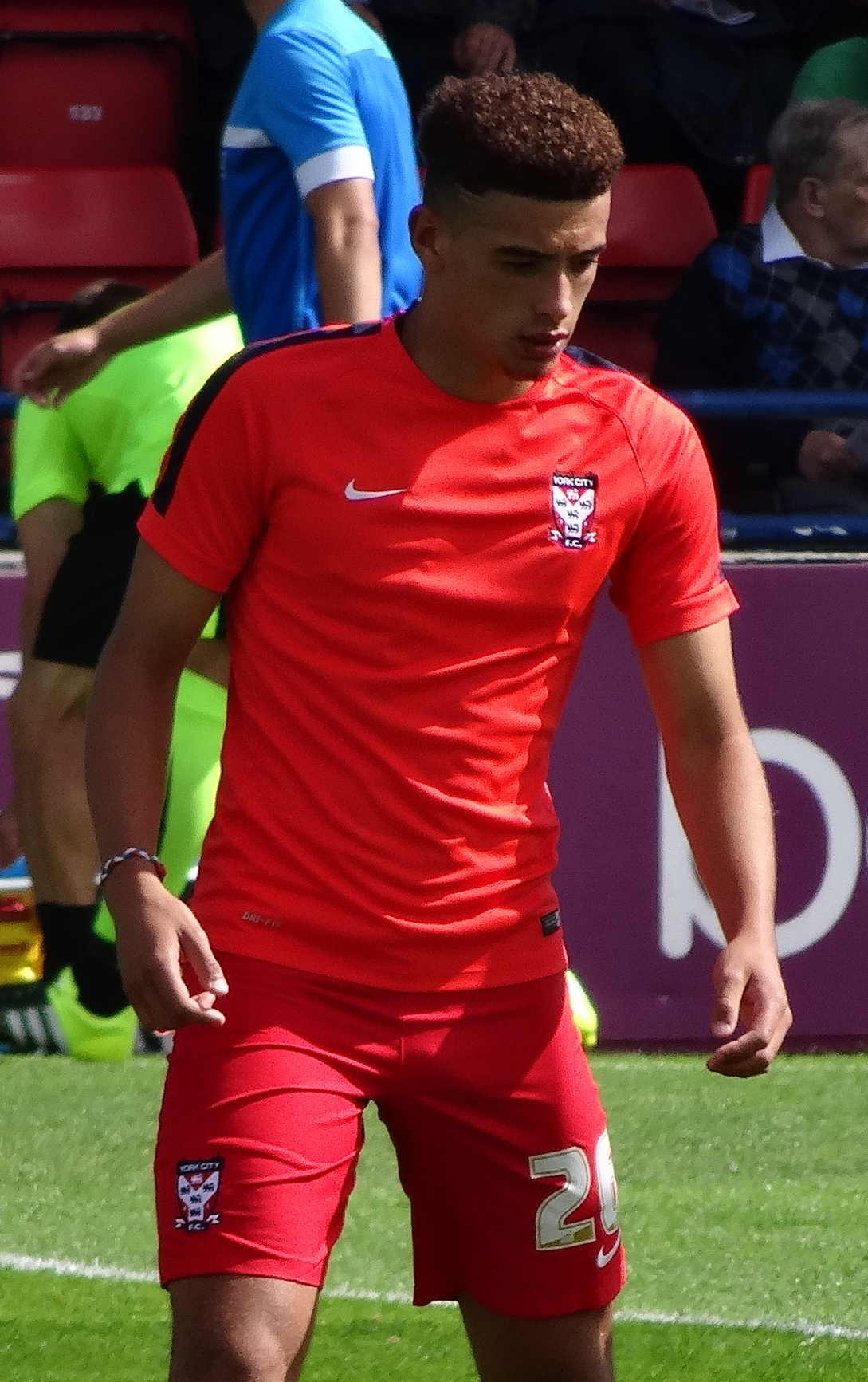
Godfrey warming up for York City in 2015

Godfrey captained the York & District under-13 team that beat Southampton at Stadium MK in the final of the English Schools' FA Inter-Association Trophy in May 2011. This was the first time a team from York had won an English Schools' FA competition. He started his career with York City's youth system, before moving to Middlesbrough's academy in the summer of 2011. After being released by the club, he had trials with Leeds United and Sheffield Wednesday, before returning to York at under-15 level, with whom he started his scholarship. Godfrey captained York's under-18 team in the 2014–15 season, while still a first-year scholar. His first involvement with the first team came as an unused substitute in a League Two match against Newport County on 11 October 2014. Godfrey made his debut aged 17 when starting York's 1–0 home win over Yeovil Town on 18 August 2015. He scored his first goal for York in the eighth minute of stoppage time in a 2–1 home loss to Plymouth Argyle on 14 November 2015 with a shot from 10 yards.

=== Norwich City ===
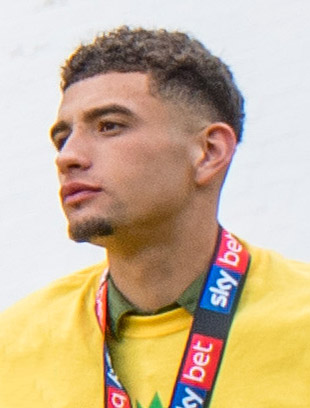
Godfrey with Norwich City in 2019

Godfrey signed for Premier League club Norwich City on 15 January 2016 on a three-and-a-half-year contract for an undisclosed fee and would initially play in their academy team. He made his debut on 23 August as a substitute in the 65th minute of Norwich's EFL Cup second round match against Coventry City and scored in the 87th minute of a 6–1 home win with a shot from outside the penalty area. Godfrey made his league debut in a 2–0 home win over Birmingham City on 28 January 2017 as an 81st-minute substitute. He signed a new four-year contract with Norwich on 11 August 2017, keeping him at the club until the summer of 2021.

On 24 August 2017, Godfrey joined League One club Shrewsbury Town on loan until 1 January 2018. The deal was later extended to the end of the season.

For the 2018–19 season, Godfrey returned to Norwich. He played in their four EFL Cup games but his appearances in the league were limited to substitute appearances until December: With centre-backs Grant Hanley and Timm Klose both injured, Godfrey made his first league start for Norwich in the Championship match against Bolton Wanderers, partnering Christoph Zimmermann at centre half in a 3–2 win. He remained in the side even when Hanley was fit again and scored his first goal for Norwich at the end of the year to give them an early lead against Derby County, although a late comeback from Derby saw Norwich lose the game 4–3. This was only a temporary setback for both Godfrey and Norwich however. Godfrey would score three more goals, all of which would earn Norwich points as they chased promotion back to the Premier League. This was achieved in the penultimate game, a 2–1 win over Blackburn Rovers, with Godfrey in the team. In all, Godfrey played 31 league games during the season, starting 26 of them.

Godfrey made his first Premier League appearance in the opening game of the 2019–20 season, a 4–1 defeat against Liverpool, playing alongside Hanley. There were again a number of injuries to centre halves throughout the season, to the point that Godfrey was the only fit regular centre back at one point, and even captained the side with Hanley, Alexander Tettey, Klose and Zimmermann all out injured. After prominent performances by winning two of their first five games, Norwich were soon demoted to the bottom of the table. When they did record a rare win against fellow strugglers AFC Bournemouth, Godfrey was sent off in the second half for a late challenge on fellow Englishman Callum Wilson, having the unfortunate distinction of being the first Premier League player to be dismissed as a result of a referee consulting a VAR monitor. Godfrey again made 30 league appearances for Norwich but, in a season disrupted by a three-month suspension during the 2020 COVID-19 pandemic, the club were relegated back to the Championship.

Godfrey would play in Norwich's first three games in the 2020–21 season, making his last appearance for the club in a 1–0 defeat against Bournemouth.

=== Everton ===
On 5 October 2020, Godfrey signed for Premier League club Everton on a five-year contract for an undisclosed fee, reported by The Athletic to be an initial £20 million, potentially rising to £25 million in add-ons. He made his debut on 17 October in a Merseyside derby against local rivals Liverpool in a 2–2 draw at home in the Premier League, coming on as a 31st-minute substitute after an injury to right-back and captain Séamus Coleman. Adam Jones of the Liverpool Echo said that Godfrey "was thrown into the deep end for his debut and stood up to the task very well".

At the end of his first season at the club, Godfrey was voted by Everton fans as the club's Young Player of the Season.

=== Atalanta and loans out ===
On 28 June 2024, Godfrey moved to Italy, signing for Serie A club Atalanta for an undisclosed fee reported to be in the region of £11 million with a sell-on clause.

On 5 January 2025, having made just five appearances since joining Atalanta, Godfrey returned to the Premier League, joining Ipswich Town on loan for the remainder of the 2024–25 season. He made his debut a week later when starting in Ipswich's 3–0 home win over Bristol Rovers in the 2024–25 FA Cup third round.

On 22 August 2025, Godfrey joined EFL Championship club Sheffield United on loan for the 2025–26 season. He made his debut the following day in United's 1–0 home defeat to Millwall. On 19 December, it was announced that Sheffield United had terminated Godfrey's loan contract early, sending him back to Atalanta effectively.

On 20 January 2026, Atalanta sent Godfrey on loan to Danish Superliga club Brøndby until the end of the 2025–26 season. He made his competitive debut on 8 February in a 0–0 home draw against Randers, playing the full match.

== International career ==
Godfrey received his first call-up for the England national under-20 team ahead of their 2018–19 Under 20 Elite League fixtures against Poland and Portugal in March 2019. He made his debut on 21 March when starting the 3–1 defeat at home to Poland. He made his second and final appearance for the under-20s in the following match, a 1–0 defeat away to Portugal on 26 March, as England finished in fourth place in the Under 20 Elite League.

Godfrey was included in the England national under-21 team for the first time for their 2021 UEFA European Under-21 Championship qualification matches against Turkey and Kosovo in September 2019. He made his debut as an 81st-minute substitute during a 3–2 away win against Turkey on 6 September. He started the following match as captain, as England beat Kosovo 2–0 at home on 9 September. Godfrey scored his first international goal on 8 September 2020 in a 2–1 away win against Austria in 2021 European Under-21 Championship qualification with a sliding finish after a well-timed run. He was in England's squad for the 2021 European Under-21 Championship and played in their first two matches in the group stage before missing the third and final match through injury. England were eliminated from the tournament after finishing bottom of a four-team group. Godfrey finished his under-21 career with nine appearances and one goal from 2019 to 2021.

On 25 May 2021, Godfrey was called up as part of Gareth Southgate's 33-man provisional England squad for the delayed UEFA Euro 2020. He was not named in the final 26-man squad, with Southgate stating that Godfrey was part of the provisional squad "in order to gain experience", and remained in the squad for England's pre-tournament friendlies against Austria and Romania at the Riverside Stadium. Godfrey made his debut on 2 June as a 61st-minute substitute as England beat Austria 1–0, and made his first start four days later, playing the entirety of a 1–0 win over Romania.

== Style of play ==
A physically durable player, Godfrey primarily plays as a centre-back, but has also been deployed as a central midfielder and as a full-back in his early career.

== Career statistics ==
=== Club ===
As of match played 21 May 2026

Appearances and goals by club, season and competition
Club	Season	League			National cup (Note: Includes FA Cup, Coppa Italia)		League cup (Note: Includes Football League Cup/EFL Cup)		Europe		Other		Total	
Club	Season	Division	Apps	Goals	Apps	Goals	Apps	Goals	Apps	Goals	Apps	Goals	Apps	Goals
York City	2014–15	League Two	0	0	0	0	0	0	—		0	0	0	0
York City	2015–16	League Two	12	1	1	0	1	0	—		1 (Note: Appearance in Football League Trophy)	0	15	1
York City	Total		12	1	1	0	1	0	—		1	0	15	1
Norwich City	2015–16	Premier League	0	0	—		—		—		—		0	0
Norwich City	2016–17	Championship	2	0	1	0	3	1	—		—		6	1
Norwich City	2017–18	Championship	0	0	—		0	0	—		—		0	0
Norwich City	2018–19	Championship	31	4	1	0	4	0	—		—		36	4
Norwich City	2019–20	Premier League	30	0	2	0	1	0	—		—		33	0
Norwich City	2020–21	Championship	3	0	—		0	0	—		—		3	0
Norwich City	Total		66	4	4	0	8	1	—		—		78	5
Norwich City U23	2016–17	—			—		—		—		4 (Note: Appearances in EFL Trophy)	0	4	0
Shrewsbury Town (loan)	2017–18	League One	40	1	4	0	—		—		7 (Note: Four appearances in EFL Trophy, three appearances in League One play-offs)	0	51	1
Everton	2020–21	Premier League	31	0	4	0	1	0	—		—		36	0
Everton	2021–22	Premier League	23	0	3	0	1	0	—		—		27	0
Everton	2022–23	Premier League	13	0	1	0	0	0	—		—		14	0
Everton	2023–24	Premier League	15	0	0	0	1	0	—		—		16	0
Everton	Total		82	0	8	0	3	0	—		—		93	0
Atalanta	2024–25	Serie A	1	0	1	0	—		2 (Note: Appearances in UEFA Champions League)	0	1 (Note: Appearance in UEFA Super Cup)	0	5	0
Ipswich Town (loan)	2024–25	Premier League	3	0	2	0	—		—		—		5	0
Sheffield United (loan)	2025–26	Championship	4	0	0	0	—		—		—		4	0
Brøndby (loan)	2025–26	Danish Superliga	11	1	0	0	—		—		1 (Note: Appearance in Danish Superliga play-off)	0	12	1
Career total			219	7	20	0	12	1	2	0	14	0	267	8

=== International ===
Appearances and goals by national team and year
National team	Year	Apps	Goals
England	2021	2	0
Total		2	0

== Honours ==
Shrewsbury Town

- EFL Trophy runner-up: 2017–18

Norwich City

- EFL Championship: 2018–19

Individual

- Everton Young Player of the Season: 2020–21
