= 2021–22 Udinese Calcio season =

Udinese
2021–22 season
- Owner: Giampaolo Pozzo
- President: Franco Soldati
- Manager: Luca Gotti (until 7 December); Gabriele Cioffi (caretaker, from 7 December)
- Stadium: Stadio Friuli
- Serie A: 12th
- Coppa Italia: Round of 16
- Top goalscorer: League: Gerard Deulofeu (13); All: Gerard Deulofeu (13)
Home colours	Away colours	Third colours

The 2021–22 season was the 125th season in the existence of Udinese Calcio and the club's 27th consecutive season in the top flight of Italian football. In addition to the domestic league, Udinese participated in this season's edition of the Coppa Italia.

== Players ==
As of 20 January 2022

Note: Flags indicate national team as defined under FIFA eligibility rules; some limited exceptions apply. Players may hold more than one non-FIFA nationality.

No.	Pos.	Nation	Player
1	GK	ITA	Marco Silvestri
2	DF	ARG	Nehuén Pérez (on loan from Atlético Madrid)
4	DF	NED	Marvin Zeegelaar
5	MF	GER	Tolgay Arslan
6	MF	FRA	Jean-Victor Makengo
7	FW	NGR	Isaac Success
8	MF	BIH	Mato Jajalo
9	FW	POR	Beto (on loan from Portimonense)
10	FW	ESP	Gerard Deulofeu
11	MF	BRA	Walace
13	DF	ITA	Destiny Udogie (on loan from Hellas Verona)
16	DF	ARG	Nahuel Molina

No.	Pos.	Nation	Player
17	DF	NED	Bram Nuytinck (captain)
19	DF	DEN	Jens Stryger Larsen
20	GK	ITA	Daniele Padelli
22	DF	ESP	Pablo Marí (on loan from Arsenal)
23	FW	ARG	Ignacio Pussetto (on loan from Watford)
24	MF	GER	Lazar Samardžić
28	DF	CRO	Filip Benković
29	GK	DOM	Antonio Santurro
30	FW	MKD	Ilija Nestorovski
37	MF	ARG	Roberto Pereyra
50	DF	BRA	Rodrigo Becão
93	DF	FRA	Brandon Soppy

=== Other players under contract ===
As of 30 December 2021
Features player not included in main roster.

Note: Flags indicate national team as defined under FIFA eligibility rules; some limited exceptions apply. Players may hold more than one non-FIFA nationality.

No. / Pos. / Nation / Player; — / MF / CZE / Jan Kubala	No. / Pos. / Nation / Player; — / MF / SRB / Petar Mićin

=== Out on loan ===
As of 26 January 2022

Note: Flags indicate national team as defined under FIFA eligibility rules; some limited exceptions apply. Players may hold more than one non-FIFA nationality.

No.	Pos.	Nation	Player
—	GK	ITA	Manuel Gasparini (at Legnago Salus until 30 June 2022)
—	MF	ITA	Marco Ballarini (at Foggia until 30 June 2022)
—	MF	ITA	Thomas Battistella (at Carrarese until 30 June 2022)
—	MF	SEN	Mamadou Coulibaly (at Salernitana until 30 June 2022)
—	MF	NOR	Martin Palumbo (at Juventus U23 until 30 June 2022)
—	FW	BIH	Riad Bajić (at Brescia until 30 June 2022)

No.	Pos.	Nation	Player
—	FW	ESP	Cristo González (at (Spain) Valladolid until 30 June 2022)
—	FW	ITA	Kevin Lasagna (at Hellas Verona until 30 June 2022)
—	FW	BRA	Ryder Matos (at Perugia until 30 June 2022)
—	FW	BRA	Felipe Vizeu (at (Japan) Yokohama FC until 30 June 2022)
—	DF	IRL	James Abankwah (at (Republic of Ireland) St Patrick's Athletic until 30 June 2022)

== Pre-season and friendlies ==
Win Draw Loss Fixtures

17 July 2021 Friendly	Udinese (Italy)	4–1	(Slovenia) Bilje	Udine, Italy
17:00 CEST (UTC+2)	Okaka 23'; Makengo 51'; González 63', 90'	Report	Žižmond 33'	Stadium: Centro Sportivo Dino Bruseschi; Referee: Baroni Di Firenze

28 July 2021 Friendly	Udinese (Italy)	2–3	(Austria) Sturm Graz	Sankt Veit an der Glan, Austria
18:00 CEST (UTC+2)	Pussetto 45'; Forestieri 57'	Report	Kiteishvili 9'; Yeboah 39'; Kuen 81' (pen.)	Stadium: Jacques Lemans Arena

31 July 2021 Friendly	Lens (France)	4–1	(Italy) Udinese	Lens, France
18:00 CEST (UTC+2)	Wooh 13'; Boura 16'; Clauss (yellow card) 26'; Banza 45+2'; Costa 89'	Report	Makengo (yellow card) 43'; Samir 77'	Stadium: Stade Bollaert-Delelis; Referee: Thomas Léonard

7 August 2021 Friendly	Watford (England)	Cancelled	(Italy) Udinese	Watford, England
16:00 CEST (UTC+2)				Stadium: Vicarage Road

7 August 2021 Friendly	Udinese (Italy)	1–0	(Italy) Empoli	Abano Terme, Italy
18:00 CEST (UTC+2)	Viti 43' (o.g.)	Report		Stadium: Stadio di Monteortone; Referee: Giovanni Ayroldi

4 September 2021 Friendly	Udinese (Italy)	4–1	(Italy) Dolomiti Bellunesi	Udine, Italy
16:00 CEST (UTC+2)	Deulofeu 23'; Jajalo 44'; Beto 55'; Okaka 90'	Report	Petdji Tsila 76'	Stadium: Stadio Friuli; Referee: Federico Muccignato

13 November 2021 Friendly	Udinese (Italy)	2–2	(Slovenia) Koper	Udine, Italy
15:00 CET (UTC+1)	Success 22'; De Maio 74'	Report	Žužek 8'; Barišič 43'	Stadium: Stadio Friuli; Referee: David Santarossa

== Competitions ==
=== Overall record ===
Competition	First match	Last match	Starting round	Final position	Record							
Competition	First match	Last match	Starting round	Final position	Pld	W	D	L	GF	GA	GD	Win %
Serie A	22 August 2021	22 May 2022	Matchday 1	12th	38	11	14	13	61	58	+3	28.95
Coppa Italia	13 August 2021	18 January 2022	First round	Round of 16	3	2	0	1	7	2	+5	66.67
Total					41	13	14	14	68	60	+8	31.71

Source: Soccerway

=== Serie A ===
==== League table ====
Pos	Team	Pld	W	D	L	GF	GA	GD	Pts
10	Torino	38	13	11	14	46	41	+5	50 (Note: Torino finished ahead of Sassuolo on head-to-head points: Sassuolo 0–1 Torino, Torino 1–1 Sassuolo.)
11	Sassuolo	38	13	11	14	64	66	−2	50
12	Udinese	38	11	14	13	61	58	+3	47
13	Bologna	38	12	10	16	44	55	−11	46
14	Empoli	38	10	11	17	50	70	−20	41

Source: Serie A
Rules for classification: 1) Points; 2) Head-to-head points; 3) Head-to-head goal difference; 4) Goal difference; 5) Goals scored; 6) Draw. (Note: Head-to-head record is used only after all the matches between the teams in question have been played)

==== Results summary ====
Overall								Home						Away					
Pld	W	D	L	GF	GA	GD	Pts	W	D	L	GF	GA	GD	W	D	L	GF	GA	GD
38	11	14	13	61	58	+3	47	6	7	6	31	29	+2	5	7	7	30	29	+1

Source: Serie A

==== Results by round ====
Round	1	2	3	4	5	6	7	8	9	10	11	12	13	14	15	16	17	18	19	20	21	22	23	24	25	26	27	28	29	30	31	32	33	34	35	36	37	38
Ground	H	H	A	H	A	H	A	H	A	H	A	H	A	H	A	A	H	A	H	A	H	A	A	H	A	H	A	H	H	A	H	A	H	A	H	A	H	A
Result	D	W	W	L	L	L	D	D	D	D	L	W	L	D	D	L	D	W	L	W	L	L	D	W	L	D	D	W	D	L	W	W	W	D	L	D	L	W
Position	11	6	5	8	10	13	13	10	14	14	14	14	15	14	14	14	15	14	14	14	14	15	15	14	14	16	14	14	14	14	13	13	12	12	12	12	12	12

Source: Serie A
A = Away; H = Home; W = Win; D = Draw; L = Loss

==== Matches ====
The league fixtures were announced on 14 July 2021.

22 August 2021 1	Udinese	2–2	Juventus	Udine
18:30 CEST (UTC+2)	Pereyra 51' (pen.); Walace (yellow card) 76'; Deulofeu 83'	Report	Dybala 3'; Cuadrado 23'; Szczęsny (yellow card) 50'; Kulusevski (yellow card) 88'; Ronaldo (yellow card) 90+5'	Stadium: Stadio Friuli; Attendance: 9,660; Referee: Ivano Pezzuto

27 August 2021 2	Udinese	3–0	Venezia	Udine
18:30 CEST (UTC+2)	Pussetto 29'; Deulofeu 70'; Samir (yellow card) 73'; Okaka (yellow card) 85'; Molina 90+3'	Report	Heymans (yellow card) 52'; Vacca (yellow card) 77'; Schnegg (yellow card) 90'	Stadium: Stadio Friuli; Attendance: 8,274; Referee: Livio Marinelli

12 September 2021 3	Spezia	0–1	Udinese	La Spezia
15:00 CEST (UTC+2)	Nikolaou (yellow card) 14'	Report	Pussetto (yellow card) 13'; Arslan (yellow card) 14'; Samardžić 89'	Stadium: Stadio Alberto Picco; Attendance: 5,162; Referee: Marco Guida

20 September 2021 4	Udinese	0–4	Napoli	Udine
20:45 CEST (UTC+2)	Samir (yellow card) 56'; Molina (yellow card) 66'	Report	Osimhen 24'; Rrahmani 35'; Koulibaly 52'; Mário Rui (yellow card) 82'; Lozano 84'	Stadium: Stadio Friuli; Attendance: 11,484; Referee: Gianluca Manganiello

23 September 2021 5	Roma	1–0	Udinese	Rome
20:45 CEST (UTC+2)	Abraham 36'; Pellegrini (yellow card) 56' (yellow-red card) 90'; Cristante (yellow card) 65'; Calafiori (yellow card) 66'	Report	Walace (yellow card) 32'	Stadium: Stadio Olimpico; Attendance: 29,593; Referee: Antonio Rapuano

26 September 2021 6	Udinese	0–1	Fiorentina	Udine
15:00 CEST (UTC+2)	Arslan (yellow card) 45+2'; Walace (yellow card) 53'	Report	Vlahović 16' (pen.); Martínez Quarta (yellow card) 17'; Amrabat (yellow card) 70'; Odriozola (yellow card) 90+5'	Stadium: Stadio Friuli; Attendance: 7,208; Referee: Davide Ghersini

3 October 2021 7	Sampdoria	3–3	Udinese	Genoa
15:00 CEST (UTC+2)	Stryger Larsen 24' (o.g.); Quagliarella 48' (pen.); Thorsby (yellow card) 53'; Candreva 69'; Askildsen (yellow card) 77'; Bereszyński (yellow card) 86'; Ekdal (yellow card) 90+1'	Report	Pereyra 15', (yellow card) 72'; Beto 43'; Silvestri (yellow card) 47'; Samir (yellow card) 78'; Forestieri 82', (yellow card) 90+4'; Becão (yellow card) 90+2'	Stadium: Stadio Luigi Ferraris; Attendance: 4,292; Referee: Daniele Orsato

17 October 2021 8	Udinese	1–1	Bologna	Udine
15:00 CEST (UTC+2)	Pereyra (yellow card) 23' (yellow-red card) 38'; Beto 83'	Report	Svanberg (yellow card) 49'; Barrow 67'; Vignato (yellow card) 82'; Skorupski (yellow card) 84'; Soumaoro (yellow card) 84'; Domínguez (yellow card) 87'; Hickey (yellow card) 90'; Soriano (yellow card) 90+4'	Stadium: Stadio Friuli; Attendance: 10,627; Referee: Rosario Abisso

24 October 2021 9	Atalanta	1–1	Udinese	Bergamo
12:30 CEST (UTC+2)	Malinovskyi 56'; Lovato (yellow card) 76'; Pezzella (yellow card) 78'	Report	Samir (yellow card) 17'; Pussetto (yellow card) 58'; Beto 90+4'	Stadium: Gewiss Stadium; Attendance: 9,951; Referee: Livio Marinelli

27 October 2021 10	Udinese	1–1	Hellas Verona	Udine
18:30 CEST (UTC+2)	Success 3'; Becão (yellow card) 72'	Report	Dawidowicz (yellow card) 56'; Barák 83' (pen.); Ilić (yellow card) 88'	Stadium: Stadio Friuli; Attendance: 8,751; Referee: Matteo Marchetti

31 October 2021 11	Internazionale	2–0	Udinese	Milan
12:30 CET (UTC+1)	Correa 60', 68'	Report	Beto (yellow card) 38'; Pereyra (yellow card) 51'	Stadium: San Siro; Attendance: 48,076; Referee: Juan Luca Sacchi

7 November 2021 12	Udinese	3–2	Sassuolo	Udine
15:00 CET (UTC+1)	Arslan (yellow card) 4'; Deulofeu 8'; Frattesi 39' (o.g.); Beto 51', (yellow card) 84'; Makengo (yellow card) 86' (yellow-red card) 89'	Report	Berardi 15'; Frattesi 28'; Ferrari (yellow card) 38'; Müldür (yellow card) 67'; Consigli (yellow card) 82'	Stadium: Stadio Friuli; Attendance: 8,322; Referee: Federico Dionisi

22 November 2021 13	Torino	2–1	Udinese	Turin
20:45 CET (UTC+1)	Brekalo 8'; Bremer 48'; Zaza (yellow card) 90+2'	Report	Molina (yellow card) 16'; Pereyra (yellow card) 57'; Walace (yellow card) 68'; Forestieri 77'	Stadium: Stadio Olimpico Grande Torino; Attendance: 7,034; Referee: Ivano Pezzuto

28 November 2021 14	Udinese	0–0	Genoa	Udine
12:30 CET (UTC+1)	Molina (yellow card) 45+2'; Makengo (yellow card) 56'; Pussetto (yellow card) 86'	Report	Vásquez (yellow card) 40'; Sabelli (yellow card) 44'; Ghiglione (yellow card) 86'; Rovella (yellow card) 90+1'	Stadium: Stadio Friuli; Attendance: 11,537; Referee: Francesco Meraviglia

2 December 2021 15	Lazio	4–4	Udinese	Rome
20:45 CET (UTC+1)	Immobile 34', (yellow card) 40'; Patric (yellow card) 37' (yellow-red card) 57'; Pedro 51'; Milinković-Savić 56'; Acerbi 79'	Report	Beto 17', 32'; Becão (yellow card) 29'; Molina 44', (yellow card) 53' (yellow-red card) 69'; Udogie (yellow card) 90+8'; Soppy (yellow card) 90+9'; Arslan 90+9'; Walace (red card) 90+10'	Stadium: Stadio Olimpico; Attendance: 7,000; Referee: Marco Piccinini

6 December 2021 16	Empoli	3–1	Udinese	Empoli
18:30 CET (UTC+1)	Parisi (yellow card) 9'; Żurkowski (yellow card) 47'; Stojanović 50'; Bajrami 59'; Romagnoli (yellow card) 67'; Pinamonti 78'; Tonelli (yellow card) 90+1'	Report	Deulofeu 22'; Samir (yellow card) 30'; Soppy (yellow card) 41'; Nestorovski (yellow card) 85'	Stadium: Stadio Carlo Castellani; Attendance: 4,808; Referee: Daniele Paterna

11 December 2021 17	Udinese	1–1	Milan	Udine
20:45 CET (UTC+1)	Beto 17'; Pérez (yellow card) 24'; Deulofeu (yellow card) 55'; Zeegelaar (yellow card) 87'; Success (red card) 90+5'	Report	Castillejo (yellow card) 87'; Ibrahimović 90+2'; Florenzi (yellow card) 90+5'	Stadium: Stadio Friuli; Attendance: 16,835; Referee: Francesco Fourneau

18 December 2021 18	Cagliari	0–4	Udinese	Cagliari
20:45 CET (UTC+1)	Marin (red card) 40'; Dalbert (yellow card) 43'; Bellanova (yellow card) 71'	Report	Makengo 4'; Deulofeu 45', 69', (yellow card) 70'; Molina 50'; Becão (yellow card) 84'	Stadium: Unipol Domus; Attendance: 7,864; Referee: Fabio Maresca

9 January 2022 21	Udinese	2–6	Atalanta	Udine
16:30 CET (UTC+1)	Becão (yellow card) 30'; Deulofeu (yellow card) 44'; Djimsiti 59' (o.g.); Beto 88'	Report	Pašalić 17'; Muriel 22', 76'; Malinovskyi 43'; De Roon (yellow card) 45'; Djimsiti (yellow card) 77'; Mæhle 89'; Pessina 90+2'	Stadium: Stadio Friuli; Attendance: 8,679; Referee: Michael Fabbri

15 January 2022 22	Juventus	2–0	Udinese	Turin
20:45 CET (UTC+1)	Dybala 19'; Arthur (yellow card) 23'; McKennie 79'	Report	Soppy (yellow card) 34'; Zeegelaar (yellow card) 77'	Stadium: Juventus Stadium; Attendance: 5,000; Referee: Antonio Giua

22 January 2022 23	Genoa	0–0	Udinese	Genoa
15:00 CET (UTC+1)	Sturaro (yellow card) 39'; Portanova (yellow card) 73'; Cambiaso (yellow card) 79' (yellow-red card) 79'	Report	Makengo (yellow card) 41'; Deulofeu (yellow card) 72'; Arslan (yellow card) 73'; Pérez (yellow card) 86'	Stadium: Stadio Luigi Ferraris; Attendance: 5,000; Referee: Daniele Doveri

6 February 2022 24	Udinese	2–0	Torino	Udine
18:00 CET (UTC+1)	Jajalo (yellow card) 36'; Soppy (yellow card) 66'; Arslan (yellow card) 67'; Molina 90+3'; Pussetto 90+7' (pen.)	Report	Lukić (yellow card) 20'; Mandragora (yellow card) 65' (yellow-red card) 90+2'; Singo (yellow card) 67'; Praet (yellow card) 72'	Stadium: Stadio Friuli; Attendance: 9,837; Referee: Antonio Rapuano

13 February 2022 25	Hellas Verona	4–0	Udinese	Verona
15:00 CET (UTC+1)	Depaoli 2', (yellow card) 68'; Barák 31'; Tameze (yellow card) 51', (goal) 85'; Caprari 66'; Bessa (yellow card) 90'	Report	Becão (yellow card) 51'	Stadium: Stadio Marcantonio Bentegodi; Attendance: 11,713; Referee: Andrea Colombo

20 February 2022 26	Udinese	1–1	Lazio	Udine
20:45 CET (UTC+1)	Deulofeu 5'; Arslan (yellow card) 28'; Pérez (yellow card) 44'; Makengo (yellow card) 54'	Report	Felipe Anderson 45'; Cataldi (yellow card) 70'; Zaccagni (yellow card) 72'	Stadium: Stadio Friuli; Attendance: 10,799; Referee: Luca Massimi

25 February 2022 27	Milan	1–1	Udinese	Milan
18:45 CET (UTC+1)	Leão 29', (yellow card) 90+5'; Rebić (yellow card) 68'	Report	Pérez (yellow card) 17'; Becão (yellow card) 49'; Udogie 66'; Molina (yellow card) 73'; Success (yellow card) 77'	Stadium: San Siro; Attendance: 44,588; Referee: Matteo Marchetti

5 March 2022 28	Udinese	2–1	Sampdoria	Udine
15:00 CET (UTC+1)	Deulofeu 3', (yellow card) 87'; Udogie 12'; Pereyra (yellow card) 44'; Walace (yellow card) 56'; Arslan (yellow card) 68'; Becão (yellow card) 74'	Report	Caputo 13'; Ekdal (yellow card) 63'; Murru (yellow card) 68'	Stadium: Stadio Friuli; Attendance: 12,405; Referee: Massimiliano Irrati

13 March 2022 29	Udinese	1–1	Roma	Udine
18:00 CET (UTC+1)	Molina 15'; Deulofeu (yellow card) 26'; Makengo (yellow card) 86'; Becão (yellow card) 90+4'	Report	Afena-Gyan (yellow card) 70'; Ibañez (yellow card) 88'; Pellegrini 90+4' (pen.)	Stadium: Stadio Friuli; Attendance: 15,114; Referee: Marco Di Bello

19 March 2022 30	Napoli	2–1	Udinese	Naples
15:00 CET (UTC+1)	Osimhen 52', 63', (yellow card) 90+2'; Rrahmani (yellow card) 65'	Report	Deulofeu 22'; Zeegelaar (yellow card) 45+2'; Udogie (yellow card) 50'; Marí (red card) 83'	Stadium: Stadio Diego Armando Maradona; Attendance: 37,363; Referee: Francesco Fourneau

3 April 2022 31	Udinese	5–1	Cagliari	Udine
15:00 CEST (UTC+2)	Becão 38'; Walace (yellow card) 42'; Beto 45', 49', 73'; Molina 59'; Pereyra (yellow card) 61'	Report	Dalbert (yellow card) 20'; João Pedro 32'; Grassi (yellow card) 35' (yellow-red card) 82'; Baselli (yellow card) 59'	Stadium: Stadio Friuli; Attendance: 12,215; Referee: Rosario Abisso

10 April 2022 32	Venezia	1–2	Udinese	Venice
15:00 CEST (UTC+2)	Busio (yellow card) 2'; Cuisance (yellow card) 18'; Haps (yellow card) 28'; Henry (yellow card) 59', (goal) 86'; Ceccaroni (yellow card) 61'; Ampadu (yellow card) 74'; Nani (yellow card) 77'	Report	Arslan (yellow card) 18'; Deulofeu 35' (pen.); Udogie (yellow card) 62'; Becão 90+4'	Stadium: Stadio Pier Luigi Penzo; Attendance: 10,459; Referee: Marco Guida

16 April 2022 33	Udinese	4–1	Empoli	Udine
14:30 CEST (UTC+2)	Ismajli 6' (o.g.); Deulofeu 52'; Molina (yellow card) 63'; Pussetto 79'; Samardžić 87'	Report	Ismajli (yellow card) 44'; Stojanović (yellow card) 61'; Bandinelli (yellow card) 63'; Pinamonti 70' (pen.); Verre (yellow card) 85'	Stadium: Stadio Friuli; Attendance: 15,226; Referee: Matteo Marchetti

20 April 2022 19	Udinese	0–1	Salernitana	Udine
18:45 CEST (UTC+2)	Jajalo (yellow card) 31'; Marí (yellow card) 89'; Deulofeu (yellow card) 90+2'	Report	Ranieri (yellow card) 56'; Éderson (yellow card) 84'; Bohinen (yellow card) 86'; Kastanos (yellow card) 90+2'; Verdi 90+3', (yellow card) 90+4'	Stadium: Stadio Friuli; Attendance: 12,362; Referee: Simone Sozza
Note: Udinese were awarded a 3–0 win and Salernitana were docked an additional point after Salernitana players failed to show up for the match. Salernitana appealed the decision and the Italian Football Association court overturned it after the government approved a new sports protocol in January with clearer guidelines on when a match should be postponed for COVID-19 related reasons.

24 April 2022 34	Bologna	2–2	Udinese	Bologna
15:00 CEST (UTC+2)	Hickey 6'; Sansone 59', (yellow card) 70'; De Silvestri (yellow card) 81'	Report	Udogie 25'; Pérez (yellow card) 30'; Success 46'; Pussetto (yellow card) 90'	Stadium: Stadio Renato Dall'Ara; Attendance: 15,922; Referee: Alberto Santoro

27 April 2022 20	Fiorentina	0–4	Udinese	Florence
18:00 CEST (UTC+2)	González (yellow card) 49'; Torreira (yellow card) 59'; Maleh (yellow card) 90+4'	Report	Marí 12'; Nuytinck (yellow card) 16'; Deulofeu 36', (yellow card) 49'; Makengo (yellow card) 55'; Udogie (yellow card) 80', (goal) 90+5'; Walace 90+1'	Stadium: Stadio Artemio Franchi; Attendance: 22,067; Referee: Ivano Pezzuto
Note: The match was originally scheduled for 6 January 2022, but was postponed to 27 April 2022 due to COVID-19 outbreaks within the squads.

1 May 2022 35	Udinese	1–2	Internazionale	Udine
18:00 CEST (UTC+2)	Marí (yellow card) 40'; Pereyra (yellow card) 65'; Pussetto 72'	Report	Perišić 12'; Martínez (penalty missed) 39', 39'; Vecino (yellow card) 90+2'	Stadium: Stadio Friuli; Attendance: 20,910; Referee: Daniele Chiffi

7 May 2022 36	Sassuolo	1–1	Udinese	Reggio Emilia
18:00 CEST (UTC+2)	Scamacca 6'; Ayhan (yellow card) 39'; Kyriakopoulos (yellow card) 76'	Report	Pérez (yellow card) 15'; Becão (yellow card) 39'; Nuytinck 77'	Stadium: Mapei Stadium – Città del Tricolore; Attendance: 7,460; Referee: Matteo Marcenaro

14 May 2022 37	Udinese	2–3	Spezia	Udine
18:00 CEST (UTC+2)	Nuytinck (yellow card) 18'; Molina 26'; Pereyra (yellow card) 71'; Marí 90+3'; Arslan (yellow card) 90+3'	Report	Gyasi (yellow card) 19', (goal) 45+3'; Verde 35'; Maggiore 47'; Kiwior (yellow card) 80'; Manaj (penalty missed) 90+1'	Stadium: Stadio Friuli; Attendance: 20,950; Referee: Gianluca Aureliano

22 May 2022 38	Salernitana	0–4	Udinese	Salerno
21:00 CEST (UTC+2)	Belec (yellow card) 45+4'	Report	Deulofeu 6'; Nestorovski 34'; Udogie 42'; Pereyra (penalty missed) 45+6', 57', (yellow card) 58'	Stadium: Stadio Arechi; Attendance: 29,739; Referee: Daniele Orsato

=== Coppa Italia ===
13 August 2021 First round	Udinese	3–1	Ascoli	Udine
20:45 CEST (UTC+2)	Pereyra 11', 55'; Stryger Larsen (yellow card) 38'; Molina 53'	Report	Avlonitis (yellow card) 29'; Baschirotto (yellow card) 63'; Dionisi (yellow card) 80'; D'Orazio 90+2'	Stadium: Dacia Arena; Attendance: 2,604; Referee: Matteo Gariglio

14 December 2021 Second round	Udinese	4–0	Crotone	Udine
18:00 CET (UTC+1)	Pussetto 20', 62'; De Maio 28'; Jajalo (yellow card) 36'; Success 41' (pen.); Zeegelaar (yellow card) 84'	Report		Stadium: Stadio Friuli; Attendance: 1,291; Referee: Matteo Gualtieri

18 January 2022 Round of 16	Lazio	1–0 (a.e.t.)	Udinese	Rome
17:30 CET (UTC+1)	Luiz Felipe (yellow card) 52'; Patric (yellow card) 63'; Cataldi (yellow card) 78'; Felipe Anderson (yellow card) 97'; Immobile 106'; Hysaj (yellow card) 110'; Moro (yellow card) 118'	Report	Becão (yellow card) 10'; Zeegelaar (yellow card) 42'; Pussetto (yellow card) 48'; Pérez (yellow card) 101'; Soppy (yellow card) 110'; Arslan (yellow card) 117'	Stadium: Stadio Olimpico; Referee: Daniele Minelli

== Statistics ==
=== Appearances and goals ===
No.	Pos	Nat	Player	Total		Serie A		Coppa Italia	
No.	Pos	Nat	Player	Apps	Goals	Apps	Goals	Apps	Goals
Goalkeepers
1	GK	(Italy) ITA	Marco Silvestri	37	0	35	0	2	0
28	GK	(Italy) ITA	Daniele Padelli	4	0	3	0	1	0
Defenders
2	DF	(Argentina) ARG	Nehuén Pérez	22	0	19+1	0	2	0
4	DF	(Netherlands) NED	Marvin Zeegelaar	16	0	6+8	0	2	0
13	DF	(Italy) ITA	Destiny Udogie	37	5	29+6	5	2	0
16	DF	(Argentina) ARG	Nahuel Molina	37	8	31+4	7	1+1	1
17	DF	(Netherlands) NED	Bram Nuytinck	29	1	23+4	1	1+1	0
19	DF	(Denmark) DEN	Jens Stryger Larsen	12	0	8+3	0	1	0
22	DF	(Spain) ESP	Pablo Marí	15	2	15	2	0	0
28	DF	(Croatia) CRO	Filip Benković	2	0	0+2	0	0	0
50	DF	(Brazil) BRA	Rodrigo Becão	36	2	35	2	1	0
93	DF	(France) FRA	Brandon Soppy	30	0	7+21	0	2	0
Midfielders
5	MF	(Germany) GER	Tolgay Arslan	33	1	22+8	1	0+3	0
6	MF	(France) FRA	Jean-Victor Makengo	36	1	26+7	1	2+1	0
8	MF	(Bosnia and Herzegovina) BIH	Mato Jajalo	24	0	6+16	0	2	0
11	MF	(Brazil) BRA	Walace	38	1	33+3	1	2	0
24	MF	(Germany) GER	Lazar Samardzic	24	2	1+21	2	2	0
37	MF	(Argentina) ARG	Roberto Pereyra	25	5	22+2	3	1	2
75	MF	(Italy) ITA	Riccardo Pinzi	1	0	0+1	0	0	0
80	MF	(Italy) ITA	Simone Pafundi	1	0	0+1	0	0	0
Forwards
7	FW	(Nigeria) NGR	Isaac Success	24	2	11+11	2	2	0
9	FW	(Portugal) POR	Beto	29	11	24+4	11	0+1	0
10	FW	(Spain) ESP	Gerard Deulofeu	35	13	31+3	13	0+1	0
14	FW	(Nigeria) NGR	Isaac Success	9	2	4+4	1	1	1
23	FW	(Argentina) ARG	Ignacio Pussetto	31	6	11+17	4	3	2
30	FW	(North Macedonia) MKD	Ilija Nestorovski	9	1	1+6	1	0+2	0
Players transferred out during the season
3	DF	(Brazil) BRA	Samir	19	0	17	0	2	0
87	DF	(France) FRA	Sebastien De Maio	4	1	2	0	1+1	1
45	MF	(Argentina) ARG	Fernando Forestieri	6	2	0+4	2	0+2	0
9	FW	(Spain) ESP	Cristo González	1	0	0	0	1	0
7	FW	(Italy) ITA	Stefano Okaka	3	1	0+2	0	0+1	1

Last updated: 22 May 2022
Source: Competitions
