= Lazar Samardžić =

Serbia international footballer (born 2002)

Personal information
- Full name: Lazar Vujadin Samardžić
- Date of birth: 24 February 2002 (age 24)
- Place of birth: Berlin, Germany
- Height: 1.84 m (6 ft 0 in)
- Position: Attacking midfielder

Team information
- Current team: Atalanta
- Number: 10

Youth career
- Blau-Weiß Spandau
- –2008: Schwarz-Weiß Neukölln
- 2008–2009: Grün-Weiss Neukölln
- 2009–2020: Hertha BSC

Senior career*
Years	Team	Apps	(Gls)
2020	Hertha BSC	3	(0)
2020–2021	RB Leipzig	7	(0)
2021–2024	Udinese	93	(13)
2024–	Atalanta	66	(5)

International career^{‡}
2017–2018	Germany U16	7	(2)
2019	Germany U17	5	(1)
2019	Germany U19	6	(2)
2020–2022	Germany U20	5	(2)
2022–2023	Germany U21	5	(2)
2023–	Serbia	31	(1)
- * Club domestic league appearances and goals as of 23:07, 3 November 2026 (UTC) ‡ National team caps and goals as of 13 November 2026

Lazar Vujadin Samardžić (Serbian Cyrillic: Лазар Вујадин Самарџић, pronounced [lâzaːr sǎmaːrdʒitɕ]; born 24 February 2002) is a professional footballer who plays as an attacking midfielder for Serie A club Atalanta. Born in Germany, he plays for the Serbia national team.

== Early life ==
Born in Berlin to Serb immigrant parents, father Mladen and mother Ana, Samardžić grew up a fan of Red Star Belgrade with two younger brothers, Luka and Tadija.

The youngster started pursuing organized football at the age of six, in 2008, in the BSV Grün-Weiss Neukölln 1950 e.V. youth system.

== Club career ==
=== Hertha BSC ===
==== Youth ====
Samardžić joined Hertha BSC on 9 October 2009. Samardžić played for the U17 and U19 teams of Hertha BSC in the Under 17 and Under 19 Bundesliga, scoring 16 and 14 goals respectively. Samardžić won the bronze award of the Fritz Walter Medal in the U17 group.

==== First team ====
Samardžić was announced to have signed a professional contract, and first appeared as an unused substitute for the professional team in a 3–3 away draw against Fortuna Düsseldorf on 28 February 2020.

Samardžić made his debut for Hertha BSC in the Bundesliga on 22 May 2020, coming on as a substitute for Per Ciljan Skjelbred in the 81st minute of the Berlin derby against Union Berlin, which finished as a 4–0 win. Samardzic is considered one of Germany's most talented prospects and he has attracted serious interest from elite clubs around the world, such as Chelsea, Barcelona and Juventus.

=== RB Leipzig ===
On 8 September 2020, Samardžić joined fellow Bundesliga side RB Leipzig on a five-year deal. He made his RB Leipzig debut on 3 October, coming off the bench in a 4–0 win against FC Schalke 04.

=== Udinese ===
Ahead of the 2021–22 season, 19-year-old Samardžić moved to Serie A club Udinese. He signed a five-year contract.

=== Atalanta ===
On 18 August 2024, Samardžić joined fellow Serie A side Atalanta on loan, with an obligation to make the transfer permanent under certain conditions. Later that year, on 26 November, he scored his first Champions League goal in a 6–1 away victory over Young Boys.

== International career ==
Samardžić played for Berlin at the Under-15 level and Germany at the Under-17 and Under-19 levels. He first appeared internationally and played two matches in the 2019 UEFA European Under-17 Championship qualification against Belarus and Slovenia. He then played in all three matches of the group stage of the tournament, scoring once, but the team failed to progress to the knockout stage. For the U-19 level, he played in the 2020 UEFA European Under-19 Championship qualification, scoring twice.

=== Serbia national team ===
In February 2023, the Football Association of Serbia announced that Samardžić had accepted manager Dragan Stojković's invitation to switch his allegiance to Serbia on his 21st birthday. He subsequently received his first official call-up to the Serbian senior national team the following month, being included in the list for the UEFA Euro 2024 qualifying matches against Lithuania and Montenegro.

On 25 March 2023, Samardžić made his debut for Serbia in a 2–0 win over Lithuania in Belgrade.

Samardžić was selected in Serbia's squad for the UEFA Euro 2024. He played in group stage matches against Slovenia and Denmark. Serbia finished fourth in the group.

== Personal life ==
Hailing from the village of Tupković Gornji near Živinice, Samardžić's Bosnian Serb father Mladen, whose family roots are from Krivošije near Kotor in Montenegro, also pursued football in his youth though never rose to professional ranks. Upon immigrating to Germany and settling in Berlin, Mladen Samardžić was active as an administrator in Berlin-based FK Srbija, a community football club for Serb immigrants. Samardžić's Bosnian Serb mother Ana hails from Jajce.

Samardžić has a middle name, a naming convention unusual for Serbs; his middle name, Vujadin, is his paternal grandfather's name that was reportedly included in newborn Lazar's birth certificate on his father Mladen's insistence.

While playing in Hertha, Samardžić began dating Sila Enisa, German-born model of Turkish descent. After getting engaged during a summer 2025 vacation in Ibiza, the couple got married in July 2026 in a Serbian Orthodox Church ceremony in Italy.

== Career statistics ==
=== Club ===
As of match played 3 November 2026

Appearances and goals by club, season and competition
Club	Season	League			National cup (Note: Includes DFB-Pokal, Coppa Italia)		Europe		Other		Total	
Club	Season	Division	Apps	Goals	Apps	Goals	Apps	Goals	Apps	Goals	Apps	Goals
Hertha BSC	2019–20	Bundesliga	3	0	0	0	—		—		3	0
RB Leipzig	2020–21	Bundesliga	7	0	2	0	0	0	—		9	0
Udinese	2021–22	Serie A	22	2	2	0	—		—		24	2
Udinese	2022–23	Serie A	37	5	2	0	—		—		39	5
Udinese	2023–24	Serie A	34	6	0	0	—		—		34	6
Udinese	2024–25	Serie A	—		1	0	—		—		1	0
Udinese	Total		93	13	5	0	—		—		98	13
Atalanta (loan)	2024–25	Serie A	31	2	2	2	8 (Note: Appearances in UEFA Champions League)	1	1 (Note: Appearance in Supercoppa Italiana)	0	42	5
Atalanta	2025–26	Serie A	26	2	2	0	10	4	—		38	6
Atalanta	2026–27	Serie A	9	1	0	0	2 (Note: Appearances in UEFA Conference League)	0	—		11	1
Atalanta	Atalanta total		66	5	4	2	20	5	1	0	91	12
Career total			169	18	11	2	20	5	1	0	201	25

=== International ===
As of match played 13 November 2026

Appearances and goals by national team and year
National team	Year	Apps	Goals
Serbia	2023	5	0
Serbia	2024	12	0
Serbia	2025	9	1
Serbia	2026	5	0
Total		31	1

Scores and results list Serbia's goal tally first.

List of international goals scored by Lazar Samardžić
No.	Date	Venue	Opponent	Score	Result	Competition
1.	20 March 2025	Ernst-Happel-Stadion, Vienna, Austria	Austria	1–1	1–1	2024–25 UEFA Nations League promotion/relegation play-offs

== Honours ==
RB Leipzig

- DFB-Pokal runner up: 2020–21

Individual

- Fritz Walter Medal U17 Bronze: 2019
