= Pinzi =

Pinzi is a surname. Notable people with the surname include:

- Giampiero Pinzi (born 1981), Italian footballer, father of Riccardo
- Riccardo Pinzi (born 2003), Italian footballer
