= 2026–27 Crystal Palace F.C. season =

English football club season

Crystal Palace
2026–27 season
- Co-owners: Woody Johnson (43%); Josh Harris (10%); David Blitzer (10%); Steve Parish (10%); Other(s) (27%)
- Chairman: Steve Parish
- Manager: Thomas Frank (from 16 November); Pierre Sage (until 12 November)
- Stadium: Selhurst Park
- Premier League: 20th
- FA Cup: Third round
- EFL Cup: Quarter-finals
- UEFA Europa League: League phase
Home colours	Away colours	Third colours

The 2026–27 season is the 121st season in the history of Crystal Palace Football Club, and their fourteenth consecutive season in the Premier League. In addition to the domestic league, the club is also participating in the FA Cup, the EFL Cup, and the UEFA Europa League.

== Managerial changes ==
Prior to the season starting, Pierre Sage was appointed manager on a three-year contract, replacing Oliver Glasner, who left at the end of his contract. However, Sage only lasted until 12 November, when he was dismissed of his role with the club bottom of the table. Four days later, Thomas Frank was appointed as the new manager on a three-year contract.

== Transfers ==
=== In ===
Date	Pos.	Player	From	Fee	Ref.
First Team
9 July 2026	RWB	(Spain) Óscar Mingueza	(Spain) Celta Vigo	Free	
7 August 2026	CB	(Japan) Takehiro Tomiyasu	(Netherlands) Ajax	Free	
11 August 2026	LW	(England) Dwight McNeil	(England) Everton	Swap Deal	
15 August 2026	RW/RWB	(Israel) Anan Khalaili	(Belgium) Union Saint-Gilloise	£24,500,000	
18 August 2026	RW/CF	(United States) Zavier Gozo	(United States) Real Salt Lake	£11,000,000	
1 September 2026	LWB	(England) Ben Chilwell	(France) Strasbourg	Free	
2 September 2026	CM	(Netherlands) Quinten Timber	(France) Marseille	£17,150,000	
Academy
17 July 2026	CM	(England) Amaari Sealey	(England) AFC Wimbledon	Undisclosed	
29 July 2026	CB	(Northern Ireland) Alfie Mulvenna	(Northern Ireland) Larne	Undisclosed	
7 September 2026	CB	(Morocco) Taha Majni	(Morocco) Union Touarga	£595,000 (Note: A potential further £85,000 in add-ons.)	

=== Out ===
Date	Pos.	Player	To	Fee	Ref.
First Team
30 July 2026	CB	(France) Maxence Lacroix	(England) Chelsea	£52,000,000	
11 August 2026	RW	(Wales) Brennan Johnson	(England) Everton	Swap Deal	
31 August 2026	RWB	(Colombia) Daniel Muñoz	(England) Nottingham Forest	£22,000,000	
31 August 2026	CM	(Northern Ireland) Justin Devenny	(England) Stoke City	Undisclosed	
Academy
29 July 2026	RWB	(England) Danny Imray	(Wales) Wrexham	£5,000,000	
17 August 2026	LB	(Republic of Ireland) Tayo Adaramola	(Belgium) Cercle Brugge	£500,000	
20 August 2026	CB	(England) Mofe Jemide	(Portugal) Alverca	Undisclosed	
1 September 2026	GK	(England) Joe Whitworth	(England) Wigan Athletic	Free transfer	
2 September 2026	CM	(England) David Ozoh	(England) Derby County	£4,000,000	

=== Loans in ===
Date	Pos.	Player	From	Date until	Ref.
First Team
12 August 2026	RW	(Ivory Coast) Evann Guessand	(England) Aston Villa	End of season (Note: Club option to sign permanently)	
26 August 2026	CB	(France) Axel Disasi	(England) Chelsea	End of season	
1 September 2026	CB	(Italy) Honest Ahanor	(Italy) Atalanta	End of season	
2 September 2026	RW	(Chile) Darío Osorio	(Denmark) Midtjylland	End of season (Note: Club option to sign permanently)	
Academy

=== Loans out ===
Date	Pos.	Player	To	Loaned until	Ref.
First Team
25 July 2026	GK	(Canada) Owen Goodman	(Scotland) Dundee	End of season	
11 August 2026	RB	(Trinidad and Tobago) Rio Cardines	(England) Bristol City	End of season	
1 September 2026	LWB	(Croatia) Borna Sosa	(Germany) 1. FC Köln	End of season	
2 September 2026	CF	(England) Romain Esse	(England) Millwall	End of season	
4 September 2026	SS	(Brazil) Matheus França	(Portugal) Alverca	End of season	
4 September 2026	RW	(Ghana) Jesurun Rak-Sakyi	(Turkey) Kasımpaşa	End of season	
Academy
4 July 2026	CAM	(Sierra Leone) Hindolo Mustapha	(England) Wigan Athletic	11 August 2026 (Note: On 11 August, Mustapha's season-long loan at Wigan Athletic was terminated by mutual consent and subsequently joined Notts County on loan.)	
11 August 2026	CAM	(Sierra Leone) Hindolo Mustapha	(England) Notts County	End of season	
25 September 2026	GK	(England) Thiago Speroni	(England) Dagenham & Redbridge	3 January 2027	

=== Released / out of contract ===
Date	Pos.	Player	Subsequent club	Joined date	Ref.
First Team
30 June 2026	RB	(England) Nathaniel Clyne			
Academy
30 June 2026	CB	(Northern Ireland) Craig Farquhar	(England) Barnet	1 July 2026	
30 June 2026	CF	(England) Jemiah Umolu	(Belgium) Gent	1 July 2026	
30 June 2026	LW	(England) Asher Agbinone	(United Arab Emirates) Al-Wahda	3 July 2026	
30 June 2026	GK	(England) Jackson Izquierdo	(England) Crawley Town	25 July 2026	
30 June 2026	CM	(Albania) Matteo Dashi	(England) Reading	31 July 2026	
30 June 2026	CDM	(England) Kaden Rodney	(Qatar) Muaither	9 August 2026	
30 June 2026	CB	(Republic of Ireland) Jake Grante	(England) St Albans City	11 August 2026	
30 June 2026	CB	(Ivory Coast) Abdul Ouedraogo	(Belgium) Gent	11 August 2026	
30 June 2026	CF	(Australia) Rylan Brownlie	(England) Barnsley	22 September 2026	
30 June 2026	CF	(England) Zach Marsh	(England) Derby County	15 October 2026	
30 June 2026	RW	(England) Zack Henry			
30 June 2026	GK	(England) Jack Mason			
30 June 2026	CB	(England) Joshua Muwana			
30 June 2026	LW	(England) David Obou			
30 June 2026	CM	(England) Stuart Oduro			
30 June 2026	CDM	(Scotland) Dylan Reid			
30 June 2026	GK	(England) Harry Whitworth			

== Pre-season and friendlies ==
On 5 June, Palace announced they would feature in the second edition of the Como Cup, with matches against Lens and Famalicão. Five days later, a trip to face Bromley was confirmed. On 26 June, a trip to Germany to face SC Freiburg was added to the schedule. Three days later, a behind closed doors meeting with Swindon Town was added to complete the pre-season calendar. On 24 July, a behind-closed-doors friendly against Fulham was announced.

Win Draw Loss Fixtures

18 July 2026 Friendly	Crystal Palace	5–1	Swindon Town	Beckenham
12:30 BST	Nketiah 9', 21'; França 56', 59' (pen.), 82'	Report	Drinan (penalty missed) 27'; Holman 33'	Stadium: Crystal Palace Training Centre; Attendance: 0 (behind closed doors)

25 July 2026 Friendly	Bromley	3–0	Crystal Palace	Bromley
15:00 BST	Adeboyejo 62', 74' (pen.); Kabamba 86'			Stadium: Hayes Lane

28 July 2026 Friendly	Crystal Palace	0–3	Lens	Como, Italy
19:00 CEST		Report	Édouard 4', 20'; Bulatović 23'	Stadium: Djarum Stadio - Giuseppe Sinigaglia
Note: 45-minute match

28 July 2026 Friendly	Famalicão	0–0 (4–5 p)	Crystal Palace	Como, Italy
20:30 CEST				Stadium: Djarum Stadio - Giuseppe Sinigaglia
Note: 45-minute match

31 July 2026 Friendly	Al-Ula	1–3	Crystal Palace	Como, Italy
19:45 CEST	Al-Sulaiheem 16'		Devenny 1'; Nketiah 10'; Canvot 57'	Stadium: Djarum Stadio - Giuseppe Sinigaglia

7 August 2026 Friendly	Fulham	1–2	Crystal Palace	New Malden
18:00 BST	Robinson 3'	Report	Sarr 33'; França 47'	Stadium: Motspur Park Training Ground; Attendance: 0 (behind closed doors)

15 August 2026 Friendly	SC Freiburg	3–0 (a.e.t.)	Crystal Palace	Freiburg, Germany
14:00 CEST	Engelhardt; Höler; Scherhant 104'			Stadium: Europa-Park Stadion

3 October 2026 Friendly	Crystal Palace	0–2	Bristol City	Selhurst
12:25 BST		Report	McNally 6'; Pring (yellow card) 39'; Twine 50'	Stadium: Selhurst Park

== Competitions ==
=== Overall record ===
Competition	First match	Last match	Starting round	Final position	Record							
Competition	First match	Last match	Starting round	Final position	Pld	W	D	L	GF	GA	GD	Win %
Premier League	22 August 2026	30 May 2027	Matchday 1	TBD	10	2	1	7	10	24	−14	20.00
FA Cup	7–11 January 2027	TBD	Third round	TBD	0	0	0	0	0	0	+0	—
EFL Cup	8 September 2026	TBD	Third round	TBD	2	2	0	0	4	0	+4	100.00
UEFA Europa League	17 September 2026	TBD	League phase	TBD	4	1	2	1	9	6	+3	25.00
Total					16	5	3	8	23	30	−7	31.25

Last updated: 8 November 2026
Source: Soccerway

=== Premier League ===
==== League table ====
Pos	Team	Pld	W	D	L	GF	GA	GD	Pts	Qualification or relegation
16	Ipswich Town	11	3	2	6	15	22	−7	11	
17	Nottingham Forest	11	2	3	6	9	15	−6	9	
18	Sunderland	11	2	3	6	8	17	−9	9	Relegation to EFL Championship
19	Manchester United	10	1	5	4	14	19	−5	8	Relegation to EFL Championship
20	Crystal Palace	11	2	1	8	12	27	−15	7	Relegation to EFL Championship

Updated to match(es) played on 21 November 2026. Source: Premier League
Rules for classification: 1) Points; 2) Goal difference; 3) Goals scored; 4) If the champions, relegated teams or qualified teams for UEFA competitions cannot be determined by rules 1 to 3 following the completion of the competition, rules 4.1 to 4.3 are applied between such teams – 4.1) Head-to-head points; 4.2) Head-to-head away goals; 4.3) Play-off at a neutral site.

==== Results summary ====
Overall								Home						Away					
Pld	W	D	L	GF	GA	GD	Pts	W	D	L	GF	GA	GD	W	D	L	GF	GA	GD
11	2	1	8	12	27	−15	7	1	0	4	7	13	−6	1	1	4	5	14	−9

Last updated: 21 November 2026.
Source: Soccerway

==== Results by round ====
Round	1	2	3	4	5	6	7	8	9	10	11	12	13	14	15	16	17	18	19	20
Ground	A	H	A	H	A	H	A	H	A	H	A	H	A	A	H	A	H	H	A	H
Result	L	L	W	L	D	W	L	L	L	L	L									
Position	16	18	13	16	15	12	14	17	18	20	20									
Points	0	0	3	3	4	7	7	7	7	7	7									

Updated to match(es) played on 21 November 2026. Source: Premier League
A = Away; H = Home; W = Win; D = Draw; L = Loss; P = Postponed

==== Matches ====
On 19 June 2026, the Premier League fixtures were released.

Win Draw Loss Fixtures

22 August 2026 1	Everton	2–0	Crystal Palace	Liverpool
15:00 BST	Dewsbury-Hall 42'; Barry 53'	Report		Stadium: Hill Dickinson Stadium; Attendance: 51,820; Referee: Paul Tierney

28 August 2026 2	Crystal Palace	1–4	Manchester City	Selhurst
20:00 BST	Donnarumma 56' (o.g.)	Report	Haaland 17', 84'; Cherki 54', 59'	Stadium: Selhurst Park; Attendance: 25,149; Referee: Andy Madley
Note: Fixture was initially scheduled for 29 August, but was rescheduled for live Sky Sports broadcasting.

5 September 2026 3	Fulham	2–3	Crystal Palace	Fulham
15:00 BST	King 11'; Palacios 43'	Report	Mitchell 35', 54'; Chilwell 77'	Stadium: Craven Cottage; Attendance: 27,014; Referee: Sam Barrott

12 September 2026 4	Crystal Palace	2–3	Ipswich Town	Selhurst
15:00 BST	Khalaili 14'; Disasi (red card) 34'; Larsen 75'	Report	Emersonn 23'; Davis 45'; Flemming 90'	Stadium: Selhurst Park; Attendance: 25,122; Referee: Chris Kavanagh

20 September 2026 5	Leeds United	0–0	Crystal Palace	Leeds
14:00 BST		Report		Stadium: Elland Road; Attendance: 36,462; Referee: Adam Herczeg
Note: Fixture was initially scheduled for 19 September, but was pushed back a day due to Palace's involvement in the UEFA Europa League on the preceding Thursday.

11 October 2026 6	Crystal Palace	3–1	Nottingham Forest	Selhurst
14:00 BST	Kamada 41'; Lerma 45+4'; Pino 59'	Report	Ndoye 3'	Stadium: Selhurst Park; Attendance: 25,120; Referee: Peter Bankes
Note: Fixture was initially scheduled for a 10 October, but was rescheduled for live broadcasting.

18 October 2026 7	Brighton & Hove Albion	5–0	Crystal Palace	Brighton and Hove
14:00 BST	Canvot 4' (o.g.); Gómez 7'; Ayari 10'; Kostoulas 49'; Hinshelwood 84'	Report		Stadium: Falmer Stadium; Attendance: 31,440; Referee: Robert Jones
Note: Fixture was initially scheduled for 17 October, but was rescheduled due to both clubs involved in European action the preceding Thursday.

25 October 2026 8	Crystal Palace	0–2	Newcastle United	Selhurst
14:00 BST		Report	Osula 47'; Barnes 58'	Stadium: Selhurst Park; Attendance: 25,018; Referee: Paul Tierney
Note: Fixture was initially scheduled for 17 October but was rescheduled due to both clubs' involvement in European action the preceding Thursday.

31 October 2026 9	Tottenham Hotspur	2–0	Crystal Palace	Tottenham
17:30 GMT	Gray 25'; Van Hecke 73'	Report	Mateta (red card) 13'	Stadium: Tottenham Hotspur Stadium; Attendance: 60,549; Referee: Michael Oliver
Note: Fixture was initially scheduled for a 15:00 kick-off, but was rescheduled for live Sky Sports broadcasting.

8 November 2026 10	Crystal Palace	1–3	Liverpool	Selhurst
14:00 GMT	Nketiah 90+5' (pen.)	Report	Mac Allister 40'; Wirtz 54'; Isak 89'	Stadium: Selhurst Park; Attendance: 25,176; Referee: Tony Harrington
Note: Fixture was initially scheduled for 28 November, but was pushed back a day for live Sky Sports broadcasting.

21 November 2026 11	Coventry City	3–2	Crystal Palace	Coventry
15:00 GMT	Awoniyi 5'; Sakamoto 30'; McNeil 85' (o.g.)	Report	Pino 13'; Larsen 45+1'	Stadium: Coventry Building Society Arena; Attendance: 31,209; Referee: Darren England

29 November 2026 12	Crystal Palace	v	Hull City	Selhurst
14:05 GMT				Stadium: Selhurst Park
Note: Fixture was initially scheduled for 28 November, but was pushed back a day for live Sky Sports broadcasting.

2 December 2026 13	Chelsea	v	Crystal Palace	Fulham
19:30 GMT				Stadium: Stamford Bridge
Note: Fixture was initially scheduled for a 20:00 kick-off, but was brought forward half-an-hour for live Sky Sports broadcasting.

5 December 2026 14	Aston Villa	v	Crystal Palace	Birmingham
15:00 GMT				Stadium: Villa Park

13 December 2026 15	Crystal Palace	v	Manchester United	Selhurst
19:00 GMT				Stadium: Selhurst Park
Note: Fixture was initially scheduled for 12 December, but was pushed back a day for live TNT Sports broadcasting.

19 December 2026 16	Sunderland	v	Crystal Palace	Sunderland
15:00 GMT				Stadium: Stadium of Light
Note: Fixture was initially scheduled for 19 December, but was pushed back a day for live Sky Sports broadcasting.

27 December 2026 17	Crystal Palace	v	Arsenal	Selhurst
19:00 GMT				Stadium: Selhurst Park
Note: Fixture was initially scheduled for 26 December, but was pushed back a day for live Sky Sports broadcasting.

30 December 2026 18	Crystal Palace	v	Bournemouth	Selhurst
19:30 GMT				Stadium: Selhurst Park
Note: Fixture was initially scheduled for a 15:00 kick-off, but was pushed back for live Sky Sports broadcasting.

2 January 2027 19	Brentford	v	Crystal Palace	Brentford
15:00 GMT				Stadium: Brentford Community Stadium

6 January 2027 20	Crystal Palace	v	Chelsea	Selhurst
19:30 GMT				Stadium: Selhurst Park
Note: Fixture was initially scheduled for a 15:00 kick-off, but was pushed back for live Sky Sports broadcasting.

=== FA Cup ===
Win Draw Loss Fixtures

=== EFL Cup ===
As a Premier League club competing in a European competition, Crystal Palace entered the EFL Cup in the third round, and were drawn at home to Middlesbrough. They were then drawn away to Fulham in the fourth round, and at home to Sunderland in the quarter-finals.

Win Draw Loss Fixtures

8 September 2026 Third round	Crystal Palace	3–0	Middlesbrough	Selhurst
19:45 BST	Larsen 37', 53'; Kamada 72'	Report		Stadium: Selhurst Park; Attendance: 13,074; Referee: Tony Harrington

28 October 2026 Fourth round	Fulham	0–1	Crystal Palace	Fulham
19:45 GMT		Report	Nketiah 37'	Stadium: Craven Cottage; Attendance: 22,420; Referee: Simon Hooper

16 December 2026 Quarter-finals	Crystal Palace	v	Sunderland	Selhurst
19:30 GMT		Report		Stadium: Selhurst Park

=== UEFA Europa League ===
==== League phase ====
Crystal Palace were drawn against Lech Poznań, TSG Hoffenheim, Real Sociedad, and Sparta Prague at home, and Lyon, Beşiktaş, Jagiellonia Białystok, and Red Bull Salzburg away in the league phase.

Pos	Team	Pld	W	D	L	GF	GA	GD	Pts	Qualification
19	(Portugal) Torreense	4	2	0	2	7	9	−2	6	Advance to knockout phase play-offs (unseeded)
20	(Spain) Real Sociedad	4	1	2	1	9	4	+5	5	Advance to knockout phase play-offs (unseeded)
21	(England) Crystal Palace	4	1	2	1	9	6	+3	5	Advance to knockout phase play-offs (unseeded)
22	(Czech Republic) Sparta Prague	4	1	1	2	6	6	0	4	Advance to knockout phase play-offs (unseeded)
23	(Germany) TSG Hoffenheim	4	1	1	2	6	6	0	4	Advance to knockout phase play-offs (unseeded)

Updated to match(es) played on 5 November 2026. Source: UEFA
Rules for classification: League phase tiebreakers

Round	1	2	3	4	5	6	7	8
Ground	H	A	A	H	H	A	H	A
Result	W	L	D	D				
Position	2	15	15	21				
Points	3	3	4	5				

Updated to match(es) played on 5 November 2026. Source: UEFA
A = Away; H = Home; W = Win; D = Draw; L = Loss

Win Draw Loss Fixtures

17 September 2026 1	Crystal Palace (England)	4–0	(Poland) Lech Poznań	London, England
20:00 BST	Pino 10'; Richards 27'; Larsen 34' (pen.); Nketiah 89'	Report	Murawski (yellow card) 76' (yellow-red card) 88'	Stadium: Selhurst Park; Attendance: 18,117; Referee: Michal Očenáš (Slovakia)

15 October 2026 2	Lyon (France)	3–2	(England) Crystal Palace	Décines-Charpieu, France
18:45 CEST	Tolisso 8'; Nuamah 45+2'; Šulc 76'	Report	Pino 50'; Kamada 81'	Stadium: Parc Olympique Lyonnais; Attendance: 40,274; Referee: João Pinheiro (Portugal)

22 October 2026 3	Beşiktaş (Turkey)	2–2	(England) Crystal Palace	Beşiktaş, Turkey
22:00 TRT	Ndidi 45+2'; Olaitan 73'	Report	Pino 51'; Mateta 55'	Stadium: Beşiktaş Stadium; Attendance: 38,622; Referee: Danny Makkelie (Netherlands)

5 November 2026 4	Crystal Palace (England)	1–1	(Germany) TSG Hoffenheim	London, England
17:45 GMT	Wharton (yellow card) 58' (yellow-red card) 77'; Kamada 90+1'	Report	Prass 7'	Stadium: Selhurst Park; Attendance: 18,741; Referee: Horațiu Feşnic (Romania)

26 November 2026 5	Crystal Palace (England)	v	(Spain) Real Sociedad	London, England
20:00 GMT		Report		Stadium: Selhurst Park

10 December 2026 6	Jagiellonia Białystok (Poland)	v	(England) Crystal Palace	Białystok, Poland
18:45 CET		Report		Stadium: Chorten Arena

21 January 2027 7	Crystal Palace (England)	v	(Czech Republic) Sparta Prague	London, England
20:00 GMT		Report		Stadium: Selhurst Park

28 January 2027 8	Red Bull Salzburg (Austria)	v	(England) Crystal Palace	Salzburg, Austria
21:00 CET		Report		Stadium: Red Bull Arena

== Statistics ==
=== Appearances and goals ===
As of match played 8 November 2026

Players with no appearances are not included on the list; italics indicate a loaned in player.

No.	Pos	Nat	Player	Total		Premier League		FA Cup		EFL Cup		Europa League	
No.	Pos	Nat	Player	Apps	Goals	Apps	Goals	Apps	Goals	Apps	Goals	Apps	Goals
1	GK	(England) ENG	Dean Henderson	7	0	5+0	0	0+0	0	1+0	0	1+0	0
3	DF	(England) ENG	Tyrick Mitchell	15	2	10+0	2	0+0	0	0+1	0	4+0	0
4	DF	(Morocco) MAR	Chadi Riad	1	0	1+0	0	0+0	0	0+0	0	0+0	0
5	DF	(France) FRA	Axel Disasi	10	0	5+1	0	0+0	0	1+0	0	3+0	0
6	DF	(France) FRA	Jaydee Canvot	12	0	8+0	0	0+0	0	0+0	0	3+1	0
7	FW	(Senegal) SEN	Ismaïla Sarr	5	0	0+2	0	0+0	0	0+0	0	1+2	0
8	DF	(Colombia) COL	Jefferson Lerma	8	1	2+4	1	0+0	0	1+1	0	0+0	0
9	FW	(England) ENG	Eddie Nketiah	14	3	3+6	1	0+0	0	1+0	1	0+4	1
10	MF	(Spain) ESP	Yeremy Pino	16	4	9+1	1	0+0	0	1+1	0	4+0	3
11	FW	(England) ENG	Dwight McNeil	13	0	3+4	0	0+0	0	0+2	0	1+3	0
12	FW	(United States) USA	Zavier Gozo	3	0	0+2	0	0+0	0	0+1	0	0+0	0
14	FW	(France) FRA	Jean-Philippe Mateta	6	1	3+1	0	0+0	0	0+0	0	2+0	1
17	DF	(Japan) JPN	Takehiro Tomiyasu	5	0	2+2	0	0+0	0	1+0	0	0+0	0
18	MF	(Japan) JPN	Daichi Kamada	16	4	10+0	1	0+0	0	0+2	1	3+1	2
19	MF	(England) ENG	Will Hughes	6	0	0+4	0	0+0	0	2+0	0	0+0	0
20	MF	(England) ENG	Adam Wharton	16	0	10+0	0	0+0	0	0+2	0	4+0	0
21	DF	(Italy) ITA	Honest Ahanor	7	0	2+1	0	0+0	0	2+0	0	2+0	0
22	FW	(Norway) NOR	Jørgen Strand Larsen	12	4	6+2	1	0+0	0	1+0	2	2+1	1
23	MF	(Netherlands) NED	Quinten Timber	10	0	6+0	0	0+0	0	1+0	0	3+0	0
24	FW	(Chile) CHI	Darío Osorio	9	0	0+4	0	0+0	0	2+0	0	0+3	0
25	DF	(Israel) ISR	Anan Khalaili	14	1	7+3	1	0+0	0	0+0	0	3+1	0
26	DF	(United States) USA	Chris Richards	15	1	10+0	0	0+0	0	1+0	0	4+0	1
28	MF	(Mali) MLI	Cheick Doucouré	1	0	0+0	0	0+0	0	1+0	0	0+0	0
29	FW	(Ivory Coast) CIV	Evann Guessand	3	0	0+2	0	0+0	0	1+0	0	0+0	0
30	DF	(Spain) ESP	Óscar Mingueza	9	0	2+2	0	0+0	0	2+0	0	1+2	0
33	DF	(England) ENG	Ben Chilwell	4	1	0+2	1	0+0	0	2+0	0	0+0	0
44	GK	(Argentina) ARG	Walter Benítez	9	0	5+0	0	0+0	0	1+0	0	3+0	0
Players who featured but departed the club permanently during the season:
2	DF	(Colombia) COL	Daniel Muñoz	1	0	1	0	0	0	0	0	0	0

=== Clean sheets ===
As of match played 8 November 2026

Rank	No.	Player	Premier League	FA Cup	EFL Cup	Europa League	Total
1	44	(Argentina) Walter Benítez	1	0	1	1	3
2	1	(England) Dean Henderson	0	0	1	0	1
Total			1	0	2	1	4

=== Disciplinary record ===
As of match played 8 November 2026

Rank	No.	Pos.	Player	Premier League			FA Cup			EFL Cup			Europa League			Total		
Rank	No.	Pos.	Player	Yellow card	(yellow card) (yellow-red card)	Red card	Yellow card	(yellow card) (yellow-red card)	Red card	Yellow card	(yellow card) (yellow-red card)	Red card	Yellow card	(yellow card) (yellow-red card)	Red card	Yellow card	(yellow card) (yellow-red card)	Red card
1	5	CB	(France) Axel Disasi	0	0	1	0	0	0	0	0	0	0	0	0	0	0	1
2	20	CM	(England) Adam Wharton	1	0	0	0	0	0	0	0	0	0	1	0	1	1	0
3	10	LW	(Spain) Yeremy Pino	4	0	0	0	0	0	0	0	0	3	0	0	7	0	0
4	8	CDM	(Colombia) Jefferson Lerma	3	0	0	0	0	0	1	0	0	0	0	0	4	0	0
5	6	CB	(France) Jaydee Canvot	1	0	0	0	0	0	0	0	0	1	0	0	2	0	0
5	18	CAM	(Japan) Daichi Kamada	2	0	0	0	0	0	0	0	0	0	0	0	2	0	0
5	25	RB	(Israel) Anan Khalaili	2	0	0	0	0	0	0	0	0	0	0	0	2	0	0
5	26	CB	(United States) Chris Richards	1	0	0	0	0	0	0	0	0	1	0	0	2	0	0
9	7	RW	(Senegal) Ismaïla Sarr	0	0	0	0	0	0	0	0	0	1	0	0	1	0	0
9	9	CF	(England) Eddie Nketiah	0	0	0	0	0	0	0	0	0	1	0	0	1	0	0
9	21	CB	(Italy) Honest Ahanor	0	0	0	0	0	0	0	0	0	1	0	0	1	0	0
9	29	RW	(Ivory Coast) Evann Guessand	0	0	0	0	0	0	1	0	0	0	0	0	1	0	0
9	30	RB	(Spain) Óscar Mingueza	1	0	0	0	0	0	0	0	0	0	0	0	1	0	0
Total				15	0	1	0	0	0	2	0	0	8	1	0	25	1	1

== Awards ==
=== Player awards ===
==== Premier League Save of the Month ====
Month	Player	Match	Result	Ref.
September	(England) Dean Henderson	v. Fulham	Nominated	
October	(Argentina) Walter Benítez	v. Nottingham Forest	Nominated	
October	(England) Dean Henderson	v. Tottenham Hotspur	Nominated	
