= Yunus Musah =

American soccer player (born 2002)

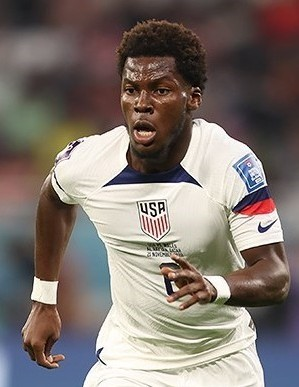
- Musah with the United States at the 2022 FIFA World Cup

Personal information
- Full name: Yunus Dimoara Musah
- Date of birth: November 29, 2002 (age 23)
- Place of birth: The Bronx, New York, U.S.
- Height: 5 ft 10 in (1.78 m)
- Positions: Midfielder; wing-back

Team information
- Current team: AC Milan
- Number: 80

Youth career
- 2008–2012: Giorgione
- 2012–2019: Arsenal
- 2019: Valencia

Senior career*
Years	Team	Apps	(Gls)
2019–2020	Valencia B	17	(1)
2020–2023	Valencia	94	(2)
2023–	AC Milan	72	(0)
2025–2026	→ Atalanta (loan)	19	(1)

International career^{‡}
2016–2017	England U15	7	(0)
2017–2018	England U16	9	(0)
2018–2019	England U17	10	(2)
2019	England U18	9	(2)
2020–	United States	50	(1)
Medal record
Representing United States
Men's soccer
CONCACAF Nations League
Winner	2021
Winner	2023
Winner	2024
- * Club domestic league appearances and goals as of 23:10, November 22, 2026 (UTC) ‡ National team caps and goals as of October 6, 2026

Yunus Dimoara Musah (born November 29, 2002) is an American professional soccer player who plays as a midfielder and wing-back for Serie A club AC Milan and the United States national team.

An alumnus of Arsenal's Hale End academy, Musah began his senior career with La Liga club Valencia in 2020 at age 17 after quickly rising through club's youth and reserve teams. With Valencia, he featured in 94 league appearances for the club. In June 2023 he signed with Serie A club AC Milan for €20 million ($21.9m) and won the 2025 Supercoppa Italiana.

Born in the United States to Ghanaian parents, he grew up mostly in Italy and England. He was a youth international for England before debuting with the U.S. senior squad in 2020 and officially committing to the nation in 2021. Musah won the CONCACAF Nations League in 2021 and 2023, and named the 2022 U.S. Soccer Young Player of the Year.

== Club career ==
=== Early career ===
Musah was born in New York City to Ghanaian parents when his mother was on vacation in the United States. After his birth, the family moved to Castelfranco Veneto, Italy, where he started his career at the local Giorgione Calcio 2000 team. In 2012, at age nine, he moved to London and joined Arsenal's academy whilst studying at Eastbury Community School in Barking. Arsenal U16 coach Trevor Bumstead stated Musah made an immediate impression; "As a player, he was 'wow'. He's got fantastic physical attributes and the drive and determination to go with that. He would play anywhere to get in the team but his favourite was as a central attacking midfield player."

=== Valencia ===
In the summer of 2019, Musah joined Valencia, at the age of 16, and was assigned to the reserves in Segunda División B. He made his debut with the B-team at the age of 16 on September 15, 2019, starting in a 0–0 home draw against La Nucía. He scored his first senior goal on March 1, 2020, netting his team's only goal in a 2–1 loss at Gimnàstic de Tarragona.

After the arrival of new manager Javi Gracia in Valencia's first team, Musah spent the 2020 pre-season with the main squad. At age 17 years and eight months, he made his first team—and La Liga—debut on September 13 of that year, starting in a 4–2 home win against Levante UD. In doing so, he became the first Englishman and American to debut for the club.

On November 1, 2020, aged 17 years and 338 days, Musah scored a goal in a 2–2 draw against Getafe CF, becoming the youngest non-Spanish player to score for Valencia, breaking the previous record held by Lee Kang-in, aged 18 years and 219 days. The following month, he extended his contract with Valencia until 2026. On December 16, in the first round of the Copa del Rey, he came on with four minutes remaining away to Tercera División club Terrassa and scored an equalizing goal as his team won 4–2 after extra time. He was nominated for the 2022 Golden Boy award for his seasonal performances.

In the 2021–22 Copa del Rey, Musah scored in wins at Utrillas and Arenteiro in the early rounds. In the final on April 23, he replaced Dimitri Foulquier after 100 minutes of a 1–1 draw against Real Betis and was the only player to miss in the penalty shootout.

=== AC Milan ===
On August 4, 2023, Musah joined Serie A club AC Milan for €18m ($19.8m) plus €2m ($2.2m) in bonuses, signing a contract until June 2028. He chose the number 80, previously worn by Ronaldinho. On September 19 at age 20, Musah made his UEFA Champions League debut against Newcastle United as a sub in the 72nd minute. On October 7, he provided his first assist for Milan in a pass to Christian Pulisic in the 1–0 win over Genoa.

On August 17, 2024, during the 2024–25 season opening match against Torino, Musah assisted Noah Okafor's equalizer to level the game 2–2 in stoppage time.

==== Loan to Atalanta ====
On 1 September 2025, Musah joined fellow Serie A club Atalanta, on an initial one-year loan deal with an option to buy at the end of the season.

== International career ==
As a youth, Musah was eligible to play for the United States, Ghana, Italy, and England.

=== England youth teams ===
Musah made his international debut with England's under-15s in 2016 and subsequently represented England up to the under-18 level. He was also called up to the under-19 squad in October 2020. A Musah penalty earned England's under-18s a draw against Brazil's under-17s on September 8, 2019, and he went on to score a crucial goal against Austria's under-18s on October 16, 2019, with England winning 3–2. In total, Musah played more than 30 times for England at youth level.

=== U.S. men's team ===
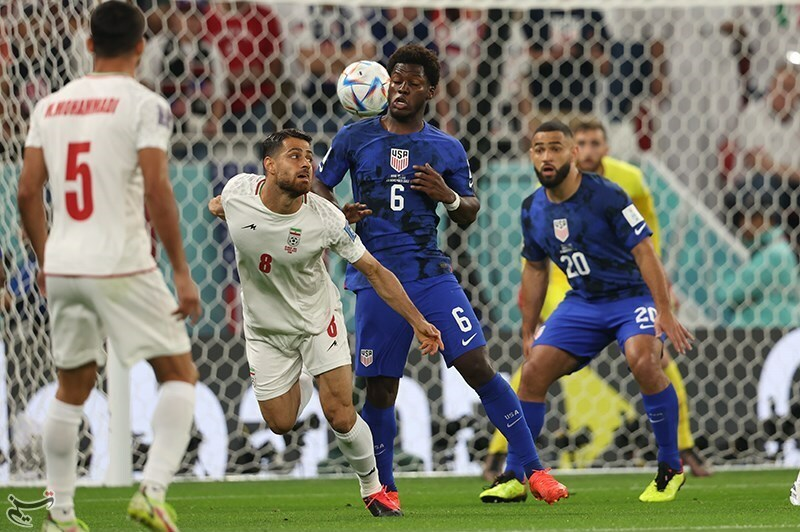
Musah at the 2022 FIFA World Cup against Iran

Musah accepted a call-up to the United States senior squad on November 2, 2020, to play in friendlies against Wales and Panama later that month. He was part of a largely Europe-based squad which included 10 first-time selections and had an average age of 22. Musah had been contacted by the United States Soccer Federation through Nico Estévez, a United States assistant manager who had connections with Valencia CF having previously managed their youth and reserve teams for eight years. Musah made his senior international debut on November 11, starting in a 0–0 draw against Wales at the Liberty Stadium in Swansea. He then started the following 6–2 win over Panama on November 16.

Despite Musah having played for the United States at senior level, England senior manager Gareth Southgate attempted to persuade Musah to play for England, stating: "We're monitoring him. He's been with us in the last couple of months and we'd very much like his future to be with us." England under-21 manager Aidy Boothroyd also stated: "I am hopeful we will see him in the U21s at some point. I don't know [if he has made his decision]. I hope he hasn't because I think if he came here and saw what we are all about that he would really enjoy it." Meanwhile, United States management continued to connect with Musah after the November USMNT camp, with assistant manager Nico Estévez in day-to-day contact and also manager Gregg Berhalter holding conversations with Musah and his family.

In late 2020, as he approached his 18th birthday, Musah was reportedly undecided on the question of which nation to represent permanently. On March 15, 2021, however, he officially committed to represent the United States internationally.

Musah played for the U.S. at the 2022 World Cup in Qatar. He was regarded as one of the tournament's best young players for his impressive performances against England and Iran in the team's group stage. He won the U.S. Soccer Young Player of the Year award in 2022. On October 12, 2024, Musah scored his debut goal for the United States in a friendly match against Panama that had a final score of 2–0.

== Personal life ==
Musah is a Muslim. During the 2022 FIFA World Cup hosted in Qatar, he stated "I'm enjoying being able to practice my religion really well." In addition to English, Musah is fluent in Italian, Spanish, Hausa, and Dagbani.

== Playing style ==
Musah mainly plays as a central and defensive midfielder, and has occasionally been deployed as a wing-back, wide midfielder, full-back, attacking midfielder and winger, he is known for his technical ability, movement, and strength.

== Career statistics ==
=== Club ===
As of match played November 22, 2026

Appearances and goals by club, season and competition
Club	Season	League			National cup (Note: Includes Copa del Rey, Coppa Italia)		Europe		Other		Total	
Club	Season	Division	Apps	Goals	Apps	Goals	Apps	Goals	Apps	Goals	Apps	Goals
Valencia B	2019–20	Segunda División B	17	1	—		—		—		17	1
Valencia	2020–21	La Liga	32	1	3	1	—		—		35	2
Valencia	2021–22	La Liga	29	1	7	2	—		—		36	3
Valencia	2022–23	La Liga	33	0	3	0	—		1 (Note: Appearance in Supercopa de España)	0	37	0
Valencia	Total		94	2	13	3	—		1	0	108	5
AC Milan	2023–24	Serie A	30	0	1	0	9 (Note: Five appearances in UEFA Champions League, four appearances in UEFA Europa League)	0	—		40	0
AC Milan	2024–25	Serie A	29	0	2	0	7 (Note: Appearances in UEFA Champions League)	0	2 (Note: Appearances in Supercoppa Italiana)	0	40	0
AC Milan	2025–26	Serie A	1	0	1	0	—		—		2	0
AC Milan	2026–27	Serie A	12	0	0	0	3 (Note: Appearances in UEFA Europa League)	0	—		15	0
AC Milan	Total		72	0	4	0	19	0	2	0	97	0
Atalanta (loan)	2025–26	Serie A	19	1	1	1	7	0	—		27	2
Career total			202	4	18	4	26	0	3	0	249	8

=== International ===
As of match played October 6, 2026

Appearances and goals by national team and year
National team	Year	Apps	Goals
United States	2020	2	0
United States	2021	9	0
United States	2022	12	0
United States	2023	10	0
United States	2024	12	1
United States	2025	2	0
United States	2026	3	0
Total		50	1

United States score listed first, score column indicates score after each United States goal.

List of international goals scored by Yunus Musah
No.	Date	Venue	Cap	Opponent	Score	Result	Competition	Ref.
1	12 October 2024	Q2 Stadium, Austin, United States	42	Panama	1–0	2–0	Friendly	

== Honors ==
Valencia

- Copa del Rey runner-up: 2021–22

AC Milan

- Supercoppa Italiana: 2024–25

United States

- CONCACAF Nations League: 2019–20, 2022–23, 2023–24

Individual

- U.S. Soccer Young Male Player of the Year: 2022
- CONCACAF Nations League Finals Best XI: 2023
