= 2025–26 Atalanta BC season =

Atalanta
2025–26 season
- President: Antonio Percassi
- Head coach: Ivan Jurić (until 10 November); Raffaele Palladino (from 11 November)
- Stadium: New Balance Arena
- Serie A: 7th
- Coppa Italia: Semi-finals
- UEFA Champions League: Round of 16
- Top goalscorer: League: Nikola Krstović; Gianluca Scamacca (10 each); All: Gianluca Scamacca (14)
- Highest home attendance: 23,243 vs Internazionale; 28 December 2025, Serie A
- Lowest home attendance: 11,651 vs Genoa; 3 December 2025, Coppa Italia
- Average home league attendance: 22,242
- Biggest win: 4–0 vs Genoa (H); 3 December 2025, Coppa Italia; 4–0 vs Parma (H); 25 January 2026, Serie A
- Biggest defeat: 1–6 vs Bayern Munich (H); 10 March 2026, Champions League
Home colours	Away colours	Third colours

The 2025–26 season was the 119th season in the history of Atalanta BC, and the club's 15th consecutive season in the Italian top flight. In addition to the domestic league, the club participated in the Coppa Italia and the UEFA Champions League.

== Players ==
=== First-team squad ===
As of 2 February 2026

Note: Flags indicate national team as defined under FIFA eligibility rules; some limited exceptions apply. Players may hold more than one non-FIFA nationality.

No.	Pos.	Nation	Player
3	DF	CIV	Odilon Kossounou
4	DF	SWE	Isak Hien
5	DF	NED	Mitchel Bakker
6	MF	USA	Yunus Musah (on loan from Milan)
7	MF	GHA	Kamaldeen Sulemana
8	MF	CRO	Mario Pašalić
9	FW	ITA	Gianluca Scamacca
10	MF	SRB	Lazar Samardžić
13	MF	BRA	Éderson
15	MF	NED	Marten de Roon (captain)
16	DF	ITA	Raoul Bellanova
17	MF	BEL	Charles De Ketelaere

No.	Pos.	Nation	Player
18	FW	ITA	Giacomo Raspadori
19	DF	ALB	Berat Djimsiti (vice-captain)
23	DF	BIH	Sead Kolašinac
29	GK	ITA	Marco Carnesecchi
31	GK	ITA	Francesco Rossi
42	DF	ITA	Giorgio Scalvini
47	MF	ITA	Lorenzo Bernasconi
57	GK	ITA	Marco Sportiello
59	MF	POL	Nicola Zalewski
69	DF	NGR	Honest Ahanor
77	DF	ITA	Davide Zappacosta
90	FW	MNE	Nikola Krstović

=== Atalanta U23 ===
Note: Flags indicate national team as defined under FIFA eligibility rules; some limited exceptions apply. Players may hold more than one non-FIFA nationality.

No.	Pos.	Nation	Player
40	DF	SLO	Relja Obrić
41	FW	GUI	Henry Camara
95	GK	ITA	Paolo Vismara

== Transfers ==
=== Summer window ===
==== In ====
Date	Pos.	Player	From	Fee	Notes	Ref.
1 July 2025	DF	(Ivory Coast) Odilon Kossounou	(Germany) Bayer Leverkusen	€20,000,000	From loan to permanent transfer	
1 July 2025	MF	(Italy) Marco Brescianini	(Italy) Frosinone	€10,000,000	From loan to permanent transfer	
1 July 2025	MF	(Serbia) Lazar Samardžić	(Italy) Udinese	€14,800,000	From loan to permanent transfer	
2 July 2025	FW	(Ghana) Kamaldeen Sulemana	(England) Southampton	€17,000,000	+ €4,000,000 add-ons	
4 July 2025	DF	(Nigeria) Honest Ahanor	(Italy) Genoa	€17,000,000	+ €6,000,000 add-ons	
18 July 2025	GK	(Italy) Marco Sportiello	(Italy) Milan	€1,000,000		
18 August 2025	MF	(Poland) Nicola Zalewski	(Italy) Internazionale	€17,000,000		
20 August 2025	FW	(Montenegro) Nikola Krstović	(Italy) Lecce	€25,000,000	+ €5,000,000 add-ons	

==== Loans in ====
Date	Pos.	Player	From	Fee	Notes	Ref.
1 September 2025	MF	(United States) Yunus Musah	(Italy) Milan	€4,000,000	Option to buy for €25,000,000	

==== Out ====
Date	Pos.	Player	To	Fee	Notes	Ref.
1 June 2025	GK	(Portugal) Rui Patrício	(United Arab Emirates) Al Ain	Free		
10 June 2025	GK	(Argentina) Juan Musso	(Spain) Atlético Madrid	€3,000,000	From loan to permanent transfer	
30 June 2025	DF	(Austria) Stefan Posch	(Italy) Bologna	Free	Return from loan	
1 July 2025	DF	(Italy) Matteo Ruggeri	(Spain) Atlético Madrid	€17,000,000	+ €3,000,000 add-ons	
1 July 2025	MF	(France) Michel Ndary Adopo	(Italy) Cagliari	€3,800,000	From loan to permanent transfer	
1 July 2025	FW	(Italy) Roberto Piccoli	(Italy) Cagliari	€12,000,000	From loan to permanent transfer	
21 July 2025	FW	(Italy) Mateo Retegui	(Saudi Arabia) Al Qadsiah	€68,250,000		
6 August 2025	MF	(Colombia) Juan Cuadrado	(Italy) Pisa	Free		
15 August 2025	DF	(Italy) Rafael Tolói	(Brazil) São Paulo	Free		

==== Loans out ====
Date	Pos.	Player	To	Fee	Notes	Ref.
22 August 2025	DF	(England) Ben Godfrey	(England) Sheffield United	Free		
26 August 2025	MF	(Italy) Marco Palestra	(Italy) Cagliari	Free		
26 August 2025	FW	(Mali) El Bilal Touré	(Turkey) Beşiktaş	€3,000,000	Obligation to buy under conditions	
1 September 2025	DF	(Italy) Giovanni Bonfanti	(Italy) Pisa	Free	Obligation to buy under conditions	
1 September 2025	MF	(Ghana) Ibrahim Sulemana	(Italy) Bologna	€500,000	Obligation to buy under conditions	

=== Winter window ===
==== In ====
Date	Pos.	Player	From	Fee	Notes	Ref.
2 January 2026	DF	(England) Ben Godfrey	(England) Sheffield United	Free	Return from loan	
20 January 2026	MF	(Ghana) Ibrahim Sulemana	(Italy) Bologna	Free	Return from loan	
28 January 2026	DF	(Italy) Giovanni Bonfanti	(Italy) Pisa	Free	Return from loan	
15 January 2026	FW	(Italy) Giacomo Raspadori	(Spain) Atlético Madrid	€22,000,000		

==== Loans in ====
Date	Pos.	Player	From	Fee	Notes	Ref.

==== Out ====
Date	Pos.	Player	To	Fee	Notes	Ref.
2 February 2026	FW	(Nigeria) Ademola Lookman	(Spain) Atlético Madrid	€35,000,000	+ €5,000,000 variables	

==== Loans out ====
Date	Pos.	Player	To	Fee	Notes	Ref.
9 January 2026	MF	(Italy) Marco Brescianini	(Italy) Fiorentina	€1,000,000	Obligation to buy under conditions	
20 January 2026	DF	(England) Ben Godfrey	(Denmark) Brøndby	Free	Option to buy for an undisclosed fee	
21 January 2026	MF	(Ghana) Ibrahim Sulemana	(Italy) Cagliari	Free	Option to buy for an undisclosed fee	
27 January 2026	FW	(Italy) Daniel Maldini	(Italy) Lazio	€1,000,000	Obligation to buy under conditions	
28 January 2026	DF	(Italy) Giovanni Bonfanti	(Italy) Spezia	Free		

== Competitions ==
=== Overall record ===
Competition	First match	Last match	Starting round	Final position	Record							
Competition	First match	Last match	Starting round	Final position	Pld	W	D	L	GF	GA	GD	Win %
Serie A	24 August 2025	22 May 2026	Matchday 1	7th	38	15	14	9	51	36	+15	39.47
Coppa Italia	3 December 2025	22 April 2026	Round of 16	Semi-finals	4	2	2	0	10	3	+7	50.00
UEFA Champions League	17 September 2025	18 March 2026	League phase	Round of 16	12	5	1	6	16	23	−7	41.67
Total					54	22	17	15	77	62	+15	40.74

Source: Soccerway

=== Serie A ===
==== League table ====
Pos	Team	Pld	W	D	L	GF	GA	GD	Pts	Qualification or relegation
5	AC Milan	38	20	10	8	53	35	+18	70	Qualification for the UEFA Europa League league phase (Note: Since the 2025–26 Coppa Italia winners, Inter Milan, qualified for the Champions League via league position, the Europa League spot awarded to the cup winners was passed to the sixth-placed team, and the Conference League spot was moved down one league position.)
6	Juventus	38	19	12	7	61	34	+27	69	Qualification for the UEFA Europa League league phase
7	Atalanta	38	15	14	9	51	36	+15	59	Qualification for the UEFA Conference League play-off round
8	Bologna	38	16	8	14	49	46	+3	56	
9	Lazio	38	14	12	12	41	40	+1	54	

Source: Serie A
Rules for classification: 1) Points; 2) Tiebreaker for Champions team and third relegated team; 3) Head-to-head points; 4) Head-to-head goal difference; 5) Goal difference; 6) Goals scored; 7) Draw.
(Note: Head-to-head record is used only after all the matches between the teams in question have been played)

==== Results summary ====
Overall								Home						Away					
Pld	W	D	L	GF	GA	GD	Pts	W	D	L	GF	GA	GD	W	D	L	GF	GA	GD
38	15	14	9	51	36	+15	59	9	6	4	25	15	+10	6	8	5	26	21	+5

Source: Serie A

==== Results by round ====
Round	1	2	3	4	5	6	7	8	9	10	11	12	13	14	15	16	17	18	19	20	21	22	23	24	25	26	27	28	29	30	31	32	33	34	35	36	37	38
Ground	H	A	H	A	A	H	H	A	H	A	H	A	H	A	H	A	H	H	A	H	A	H	A	H	A	H	A	H	A	H	A	H	A	A	H	A	H	A
Result	D	D	W	W	D	D	D	D	D	L	L	L	W	L	W	W	L	W	W	W	D	W	D	W	W	W	L	D	D	W	W	L	D	L	D	W	L	D
Position	7	11	7	5	6	6	8	7	9	11	13	13	12	12	12	9	10	8	7	7	7	7	7	7	6	7	7	7	7	7	7	7	7	7	7	7	7	7

Source: Serie A
A = Away; H = Home; W = Win; D = Draw; L = Loss

==== Matches ====
The match schedule was released on 6 June 2025.

24 August 2025 1	Atalanta	1–1	Pisa	Bergamo
20:45 CEST (UTC+2)	Maldini (yellow card) 28'; Scamacca 50'; Sulemana (yellow card) 83'	Report	Hien 26' (o.g.)	Stadium: Gewiss Stadium; Attendance: 22,235; Referee: Alberto Ruben Arena

30 August 2025 2	Parma	1–1	Atalanta	Parma
18:30 CEST (UTC+2)	Valenti (yellow card) 77'; Cutrone 85'; Oristanio (yellow card) 90+4'	Report	Hien (yellow card) 75'; Pašalić 79'; De Roon (yellow card) 90+4'	Stadium: Stadio Ennio Tardini; Attendance: 17,212; Referee: Maurizio Mariani

14 September 2025 3	Atalanta	4–1	Lecce	Bergamo
15:00 CEST (UTC+2)	Scalvini 37'; De Ketelaere 51', 73'; Zalewski 70'	Report	N'Dri 82'	Stadium: Gewiss Stadium; Attendance: 21,261; Referee: Gianluca Manganiello

21 September 2025 4	Torino	0–3	Atalanta	Turin
15:00 CEST (UTC+2)	Zapata (penalty missed) 73'	Report	Krstović 30', 38'; Sulemana 34'	Stadium: Stadio Olimpico Grande Torino; Attendance: 18,259; Referee: Andrea Colombo

27 September 2025 5	Juventus	1–1	Atalanta	Turin
18:00 CEST (UTC+2)	Cabal 78'	Report	De Roon (yellow card) 32' (yellow-red card) 80'; Sulemana 45'; Zappacosta (yellow card) 87'	Stadium: Juventus Stadium; Attendance: 40,893; Referee: Simone Sozza

4 October 2025 6	Atalanta	1–1	Como	Bergamo
20:45 CEST (UTC+2)	Samardžić 6'; Djimsiti (yellow card) 58'	Report	Perrone 19'; Diego Carlos (yellow card) 83'; Smolčić (yellow card) 85'; Addai (yellow card) 88'	Stadium: Gewiss Stadium; Attendance: 23,042; Referee: Luca Zufferli

19 October 2025 7	Atalanta	0–0	Lazio	Bergamo
18:00 CEST (UTC+2)	De Ketelaere (yellow card) 29'; Sulemana (yellow card) 40'; Pašalić (yellow card) 53'; Hien (yellow card) 62'	Report		Stadium: Gewiss Stadium; Attendance: 22,342; Referee: Giuseppe Collu

25 October 2025 8	Cremonese	1–1	Atalanta	Cremona
20:45 CEST (UTC+2)	Floriani Mussolini (yellow card) 16'; Vardy (yellow card) 51', (goal) 78'; Vázquez (yellow card) 90+4'	Report	Scamacca (yellow card) 76'; Brescianini 84'	Stadium: Stadio Giovanni Zini; Attendance: 11,052; Referee: Alberto Arena

28 October 2025 9	Atalanta	1–1	Milan	Bergamo
20:45 CET (UTC+1)	Lookman 35'; Brescianini (yellow card) 90+3'	Report	Ricci 4'; Giménez (yellow card) 9'; Modrić (yellow card) 77'; Gabbia (yellow card) 90+3'	Stadium: Gewiss Stadium; Attendance: 23,157; Referee: Daniele Doveri

1 November 2025 10	Udinese	1–0	Atalanta	Udine
15:00 CET (UTC+1)	Zaniolo 40'; Kamara (yellow card) 64'	Report	Krstović (yellow card) 66'; De Ketelaere (yellow card) 90+1'; Éderson (yellow card) 90+4'	Stadium: Stadio Friuli; Attendance: 20,167; Referee: Michael Fabbri

9 November 2025 11	Atalanta	0–3	Sassuolo	Bergamo
12:30 CET (UTC+1)		Report	Berardi 29' (pen.), 66'; Muric (yellow card) 36'; Pinamonti 47'; Candé (yellow card) 79'	Stadium: Gewiss Stadium; Attendance: 21,933; Referee: Valerio Crezzini

22 November 2025 12	Napoli	3–1	Atalanta	Naples
20:45 CET (UTC+1)	Neres 17', 38'; Lang 45'; Juan Jesus (yellow card) 75'	Report	Scamacca 52'; De Roon (yellow card) 59'; Zappacosta (yellow card) 62'	Stadium: Stadio Diego Armando Maradona; Attendance: 45,000; Referee: Marco Di Bello

30 November 2025 13	Atalanta	2–0	Fiorentina	Bergamo
18:00 CET (UTC+1)	Kossounou 41'; Lookman 52'; Hien (yellow card) 84'	Report	Pongračić (yellow card) 59'; Marí (yellow card) 69'; Mandragora (yellow card) 71'	Stadium: Gewiss Stadium; Attendance: 21,591; Referee: Matteo Marcenaro

6 December 2025 14	Hellas Verona	3–1	Atalanta	Verona
20:45 CET (UTC+1)	Belghali 28'; Giovane 36'; Nelsson (yellow card) 45'; Frese (yellow card) 50'; Bernede 71'	Report	De Roon (yellow card) 65'; Scamacca 81' (pen.)	Stadium: Stadio Marcantonio Bentegodi; Attendance: 20,949; Referee: Maurizio Mariani

13 December 2025 15	Atalanta	2–1	Cagliari	Bergamo
20:45 CET (UTC+1)	Scamacca 11', 81'; Bernasconi (yellow card) 33'	Report	Rodríguez (yellow card) 57'; Gaetano 75', (yellow card) 76'	Stadium: Gewiss Stadium; Attendance: 21,695; Referee: Davide Di Marco

21 December 2025 16	Genoa	0–1	Atalanta	Genoa
16:45 CET (UTC+1)	Leali (red card) 3'; Thorsby (yellow card) 85'	Report	Samardžić (yellow card) 60'; Zalewski (yellow card) 78'; Hien 90+4'	Stadium: Stadio Luigi Ferraris; Attendance: 30,460; Referee: Rosario Abisso

28 December 2025 17	Atalanta	0–1	Internazionale	Bergamo
20:45 CET (UTC+1)	Kolašinac (yellow card) 19'; Sulemana (yellow card) 80'	Report	L. Martínez 65'; Bastoni (yellow card) 77'	Stadium: Gewiss Stadium; Attendance: 23,243; Referee: Federico La Penna

3 January 2026 18	Atalanta	1–0	Roma	Bergamo
20:45 CET (UTC+1)	Scalvini 12'; De Roon (yellow card) 19'	Report	Mancini (yellow card) 43'; Hermoso (yellow card) 45+3'	Stadium: Gewiss Stadium; Attendance: 23,088; Referee: Michael Fabbri

7 January 2026 19	Bologna	0–2	Atalanta	Bologna
18:30 CET (UTC+1)		Report	Krstović 37', 60'	Stadium: Stadio Renato Dall'Ara; Attendance: 23,454; Referee: Marco Di Bello

10 January 2026 20	Atalanta	2–0	Torino	Bergamo
20:45 CET (UTC+1)	De Ketelaere 13'; Musah (yellow card) 87'; Pašalić 90+5'	Report	Tameze (yellow card) 25'; İlkhan (yellow card) 62'	Stadium: Gewiss Stadium; Attendance: 20,918; Referee: Francesco Fourneau

16 January 2026 21	Pisa	1–1	Atalanta	Pisa
20:45 CET (UTC+1)	Coppola (yellow card) 81'; Durosinmi 87'	Report	Pašalić (yellow card) 40'; Scalvini (yellow card) 66'; Krstović 83'	Stadium: Stadio Romeo Anconetani; Attendance: 10,372; Referee: Matteo Marchetti

25 January 2026 22	Atalanta	4–0	Parma	Bergamo
15:00 CET (UTC+1)	Scamacca 15' (pen.), (yellow card) 53'; De Roon 24'; Raspadori 73'; Krstović 90+3'	Report		Stadium: Gewiss Stadium; Attendance: 21,815; Referee: Juan Luca Sacchi

1 February 2026 23	Como	0–0	Atalanta	Como
15:00 CET (UTC+1)	Perrone (yellow card) 9'; Butez (yellow card) 36'; Addai (yellow card) 69'; Da Cunha (yellow card) 80'; Paz (penalty missed) 90+8'	Report	Ahanor (red card) 8'; De Roon (yellow card) 44'; Bellanova (yellow card) 86'; Krstović (yellow card) 90+7'	Stadium: Stadio Giuseppe Sinigaglia; Attendance: 11,925; Referee: Luca Pairetto

9 February 2026 24	Atalanta	2–1	Cremonese	Bergamo
18:30 CET (UTC+1)	Krstović 13'; Zappacosta 25'; Kolašinac (yellow card) 49'; Kossounou (yellow card) 82'	Report	Thorsby 90+4'	Stadium: Gewiss Stadium; Attendance: 21,796; Referee: Marco Piccinini

14 February 2026 25	Lazio	0–2	Atalanta	Rome
18:00 CET (UTC+1)	Taylor (yellow card) 78'	Report	Scalvini (yellow card) 10'; Ahanor (yellow card) 11'; Éderson 41' (pen.); Zalewski 60'; Bernasconi (yellow card) 74'; Djimsiti (yellow card) 90'	Stadium: Stadio Olimpico; Attendance: 3,400; Referee: Juan Luca Sacchi

22 February 2026 26	Atalanta	2–1	Napoli	Bergamo
15:00 CET (UTC+1)	Pašalić 61'; Zalewski (yellow card) 77'; Samardžić 81'	Report	Beukema 18'; Juan Jesus (yellow card) 37'	Stadium: Gewiss Stadium; Attendance: 22,015; Referee: Daniele Chiffi

1 March 2026 27	Sassuolo	2–1	Atalanta	Reggio Emilia
15:00 CET (UTC+1)	Idzes (yellow card) 12'; Pinamonti (red card) 16'; Koné 23'; Matić (yellow card) 57'; Thorstvedt 69'	Report	Bernasconi (yellow card) 21'; Zalewski (yellow card) 58'; Musah 88'	Stadium: Mapei Stadium – Città del Tricolore; Attendance: 13,260; Referee: Matteo Marchetti

7 March 2026 28	Atalanta	2–2	Udinese	Bergamo
18:00 CET (UTC+1)	De Roon (yellow card) 53'; Scamacca 75', 79'	Report	Mlačić (yellow card) 20'; Kristensen 40'; Davis 55'; Okoye (yellow card) 66'	Stadium: Gewiss Stadium; Attendance: 22,101; Referee: Antonio Rapuano

14 March 2026 29	Internazionale	1–1	Atalanta	Milan
15:00 CET (UTC+1)	Sučić (yellow card) 21'; Esposito 26'; Carlos Augusto (yellow card) 59'	Report	Kolašinac (yellow card) 21'; Krstović 82'; De Ketelaere (yellow card) 90+5'	Stadium: San Siro; Attendance: 74,364; Referee: Gianluca Manganiello

22 March 2026 30	Atalanta	1–0	Hellas Verona	Bergamo
15:00 CET (UTC+1)	Zappacosta 37'; Hien (yellow card) 83'	Report	Edmundsson (yellow card) 17'; Valentini (yellow card) 54'; Gagliardini (yellow card) 63'	Stadium: Gewiss Stadium; Attendance: 22,087; Referee: Giovanni Ayroldi

6 April 2026 31	Lecce	0–3	Atalanta	Lecce
15:00 CEST (UTC+2)		Report	Scalvini 29'; Djimsiti (yellow card) 47'; Krstović 59'; Zappacosta (yellow card) 70'; Raspadori 73'	Stadium: Stadio Via del mare Attendance: 24,884; Referee: Federico La Penna

11 April 2026 32	Atalanta	0–1	Juventus	Bergamo
20:45 CEST (UTC+2)	De Ketelaere (yellow card) 66'	Report	Boga 48'; Thuram (yellow card) 69'; Cambiaso (yellow card) 73'; Kostić (yellow card) 84'	Stadium: Gewiss Stadium; Attendance: 23,271; Referee: Fabio Maresca

18 April 2026 33	Roma	1–1	Atalanta	Rome
20:45 CEST (UTC+2)	Hermoso 45'; Pisilli (yellow card) 75'	Report	Krstović 12'; Éderson (yellow card) 65'; Djimsiti (yellow card) 90+1'	Stadium: Stadio Olimpico; Attendance: 61,474; Referee: Matteo Marcenaro

27 April 2026 34	Cagliari	3–2	Atalanta	Cagliari
18:30 CEST (UTC+2)	Mendy 1', 8'; Borrelli 47'	Report	Scamacca 40', 45'	Stadium: Unipol Domus; Attendance: 16,260; Referee: Juan Luca Sacchi

2 May 2026 35	Atalanta	0–0	Genoa	Bergamo
20:45 CEST (UTC+2)	Éderson (yellow card) 64'; Krstović (yellow card) 78'	Report	Amorim (yellow card) 19'	Stadium: Gewiss Stadium; Attendance: 22,861; Referee: Ivano Pezzuto

10 May 2026 36	Milan	2–3	Atalanta	Milan
20:45 CEST (UTC+2)	Leão (yellow card) 34'; Pavlović 88'; Estupiñán (yellow card) 89'; Saelemaekers (yellow card) 90'; Nkunku 90+4' (pen.)	Report	Éderson 7'; Zappacosta 29'; Raspadori 51'; Hien (yellow card) 70'; Krstović (yellow card) 90+5'; Bellanova (yellow card) 90+6'	Stadium: San Siro; Attendance: 73,498; Referee: Luca Zufferli

17 May 2026 37	Atalanta	0–1	Bologna	Bergamo
18:00 CEST (UTC+2)	Pašalić (yellow card) 77'	Report	Pobega (yellow card) 52'; Orsolini 78'	Stadium: Gewiss Stadium; Attendance: 22,140; Referee: Daniele Perenzoni

22 May 2026 38	Fiorentina	1–1	Atalanta	Florence
20:45 CEST (UTC+2)	Piccoli 39'	Report	Sulemana (yellow card) 47'; Ahanor (yellow card) 60'; Comuzzo 82' (o.g.)	Stadium: Stadio Artemio Franchi; Attendance: 19,606; Referee: Mario Perri

=== Coppa Italia ===
3 December 2025 Round of 16	Atalanta	4–0	Genoa	Bergamo
15:00 CET (UTC+1)	Djimsiti 19'; De Roon 54'; Pašalić 82'; Ahanor 90+1'	Report	Fini (red card) 36'	Stadium: Gewiss Stadium; Attendance: 11,651; Referee: Mario Perri

5 February 2026 Quarter-finals	Atalanta	3–0	Juventus	Bergamo
21:00 CET (UTC+1)	Scamacca 27' (pen.); Sulemana 77'; Pašalić 85'	Report		Stadium: Gewiss Stadium; Attendance: 22,623; Referee: Michael Fabbri

4 March 2026 Semi-finals; First leg	Lazio	2–2	Atalanta	Rome
21:00 CET (UTC+1)	Dele-Bashiru 47'; Dia 87'	Report	De Roon (yellow card) 23'; Pašalić 51', (yellow card) 69'; Musah 89'; Hien (yellow card) 90+5'	Stadium: Stadio Olimpico; Attendance: 5,000; Referee: Gianluca Manganiello

22 April 2026 Semi-finals; Second leg	Atalanta	1–1 (a.e.t.) (3–3 agg.) (1–2 p)	Lazio	Bergamo
21:00 CEST (UTC+2)	Kolašinac (yellow card) 31'; Pašalić 86'; Scamacca (yellow card) 117'	Report	Cancellieri (yellow card) 37'; Romagnoli 84'; Lazzari (yellow card) 120'	Stadium: Stadio Atleti Azzurri d'Italia; Attendance: 21,915; Referee: Andrea Colombo
	Penalties
	Raspadori (penalty scored); Scamacca (penalty missed); Zappacosta (penalty missed); Pašalić (penalty missed); De Ketelaere (penalty missed)		(penalty missed) Tavares; (penalty missed) Cataldi; (penalty scored) Isaksen; (penalty scored) Taylor

=== UEFA Champions League ===
==== League phase ====
The draw for the league phase was held on 28 August 2025.

Pos	Team	Pld	W	D	L	GF	GA	GD	Pts	Qualification
13	(Italian Football Federation) Juventus	8	3	4	1	14	10	+4	13	Advance to knockout phase play-offs (seeded)
14	(Royal Spanish Football Federation) Atlético Madrid	8	4	1	3	17	15	+2	13	Advance to knockout phase play-offs (seeded)
15	(Italian Football Federation) Atalanta	8	4	1	3	10	10	0	13	Advance to knockout phase play-offs (seeded)
16	(German Football Association) Bayer Leverkusen	8	3	3	2	13	14	−1	12	Advance to knockout phase play-offs (seeded)
17	(German Football Association) Borussia Dortmund	8	3	2	3	19	17	+2	11	Advance to knockout phase play-offs (unseeded)

Source: UEFA
Rules for classification: League phase tiebreakers

Round	1	2	3	4	5	6	7	8
Ground	A	H	H	A	A	H	H	A
Result	L	W	D	W	W	W	L	L
Position	36	22	17	16	10	5	13	15

Source: UEFA
A = Away; H = Home; W = Win; D = Draw; L = Loss

17 September 2025 1	Paris Saint-Germain (France)	4–0	(Italy) Atalanta	Paris, France
21:00 CEST (UTC+2)	Marquinhos 3'; Kvaratskhelia 39'; Barcola (penalty missed) 44'; Mendes 51'; Ramos 90+1'	Report	Musah (yellow card) 44'	Stadium: Parc des Princes; Attendance: 47,151; Referee: Sandro Schärer (Switzerland)

30 September 2025 2	Atalanta (Italy)	2–1	(Belgium) Club Brugge	Bergamo, Italy
18:45 CEST (UTC+2)	Musah (yellow card) 58'; Samardžić 74' (pen.); De Roon (yellow card) 81'; Pašalić 87'	Report	Tzolis 38'	Stadium: Stadio Atleti Azzurri d'Italia; Attendance: 21,950; Referee: Espen Eskås (Norway)

22 October 2025 3	Atalanta (Italy)	0–0	(Czech Republic) Slavia Prague	Bergamo, Italy
21:00 CEST (UTC+2)	Bernasconi (yellow card) 35'; De Roon (yellow card) 51'; Djimsiti (yellow card) 90+4'	Report	Bořil (yellow card) 87'; Prekop (yellow card) 90+4'	Stadium: Stadio Atleti Azzurri d'Italia; Attendance: 22,152; Referee: Ricardo de Burgos Bengoetxea (Spain)

5 November 2025 4	Marseille (France)	0–1	(Italy) Atalanta	Marseille, France
21:00 CET (UTC+1)	O'Riley (yellow card) 67'; Aguerd (yellow card) 90+8'	Report	De Ketelaere (penalty missed) 14'; Éderson (yellow card) 26'; Kossounou (yellow card) 50'; Samardžić 90'; Bellanova (yellow card) 90+2'	Stadium: Stade Vélodrome; Attendance: 64,319; Referee: José María Sánchez Martínez (Spain)

26 November 2025 5	Eintracht Frankfurt (Germany)	0–3	(Italy) Atalanta	Frankfurt, Germany
21:00 CET (UTC+1)		Report	Lookman 60'; Éderson 62'; De Ketelaere 65'	Stadium: Waldstadion; Attendance: 59,500; Referee: Chris Kavanagh (England)

9 December 2025 6	Atalanta (Italy)	2–1	(England) Chelsea	Bergamo, Italy
21:00 CET (UTC+1)	Scamacca 55'; De Ketelaere 83'	Report	João Pedro 25'; Chalobah (yellow card) 29'	Stadium: Stadio Atleti Azzurri d'Italia; Attendance: 20,685; Referee: Alejandro Hernández Hernández (Spain)

21 January 2026 7	Atalanta (Italy)	2–3	(Spain) Athletic Bilbao	Bergamo, Italy
21:00 CET (UTC+1)	Scamacca 16'; Krstović 88'; Carnesecchi (yellow card) 90+5'	Report	Vivian (yellow card) 22'; Jauregizar (yellow card) 54'; Guruzeta 58'; Serrano 70'; Navarro 74'	Stadium: Stadio Atleti Azzurri d'Italia; Attendance: 21,462; Referee: Danny Makkelie (Netherlands)

28 January 2026 8	Union Saint-Gilloise (Belgium)	1–0	(Italy) Atalanta	Brussels, Belgium
21:00 CET (UTC+1)	Burgess (yellow card) 10'; Khalaily 70'; Sykes (yellow card) 77'	Report	Samardžić (yellow card) 28'; Ahanor (yellow card) 69'; Scamacca (yellow card) 90+3'	Stadium: Constant Vanden Stock Stadium; Attendance: 15,010; Referee: Michael Oliver (England)
Note: The match was played at Constant Vanden Stock Stadium in Brussels, instead of Union Saint-Gilloise's regular stadium, Joseph Marien Stadium, which did not meet UEFA requirements.

==== Knockout phase ====
===== Knockout phase play-offs =====
The draw for the knockout phase play-offs was held on 30 January 2026.

17 February 2026 First leg	Borussia Dortmund (Germany)	2–0	(Italy) Atalanta	Dortmund, Germany
21:15 CET (UTC+1)	Guirassy 3'; Reggiani (yellow card) 18'; Beier 42'; Anton (yellow card) 48'	Report	Kossounou (yellow card) 40'; Djimsiti (yellow card) 40'; Scamacca (yellow card) 45+1'	Stadium: Westfalenstadion; Attendance: 76,900; Referee: Serdar Gözübüyük (Netherlands)
Note: The match was delayed by 15 minutes due to late team arrival caused by heavy traffic.

25 February 2026 Second leg	Atalanta (Italy)	4–1 (4–3 agg.)	(Germany) Borussia Dortmund	Bergamo, Italy
18:45 CET (UTC+1)	Scamacca 5'; Zappacosta 45'; Pašalić 57'; Hien (yellow card) 69'; Scalvini (red card) 90+7'; Samardžić 90+8' (pen.)	Report	Bensebaini (yellow card) 13' (yellow-red card) 90+7'; Can (yellow card) 53'; Silva (yellow card) 69'; Adeyemi 75'; Schlotterbeck (red card) 90+7'; Ryerson (yellow card) 90+9'	Stadium: Stadio Atleti Azzurri d'Italia; Attendance: 21,234; Referee: José María Sánchez Martínez (Spain)
Note: Scalvini and Schlotterbeck received red cards from the bench.

===== Round of 16 =====
The draw for the round of 16 was held on 27 February 2026.

10 March 2026 First leg	Atalanta (Italy)	1–6	(Germany) Bayern Munich	Bergamo, Italy
21:00 CET (UTC+1)	Musah (yellow card) 83'; Pašalić 90+3'	Report	Stanišić 12'; Olise 22', 64', (yellow card) 77'; Gnabry 25'; Laimer (yellow card) 39'; Jackson 52'; Musiala 67'; Kimmich (yellow card) 83'	Stadium: Stadio Atleti Azzurri d'Italia; Attendance: 22,557; Referee: Espen Eskås (Norway)

18 March 2026 Second leg	Bayern Munich (Germany)	4–1 (10–2 agg.)	(Italy) Atalanta	Munich, Germany
21:00 CET (UTC+1)	Kane 25' (pen.), 54'; Karl 56'; Díaz 70'	Report	Samardžić 85'	Stadium: Allianz Arena; Attendance: 75,000; Referee: Benoît Bastien (France)

== Statistics ==
=== Appearances and goals ===
No.	Pos	Nat	Player	Total		Serie A		Coppa Italia		Champions League	
No.	Pos	Nat	Player	Apps	Goals	Apps	Goals	Apps	Goals	Apps	Goals
Goalkeepers
29	GK	(Italy) ITA	Marco Carnesecchi	50	0	37	0	3	0	10	0
31	GK	(Italy) ITA	Francesco Rossi	0	0	0	0	0	0	0	0
57	GK	(Italy) ITA	Marco Sportiello	4	0	1	0	1	0	2	0
Defenders
3	DF	(Ivory Coast) CIV	Odilon Kossounou	32	1	10+9	1	0+3	0	10	0
4	DF	(Sweden) SWE	Isak Hien	39	1	20+8	1	2	0	7+2	0
5	DF	(Netherlands) NED	Mitchel Bakker	1	0	0+1	0	0	0	0	0
16	DF	(Italy) ITA	Raoul Bellanova	36	0	15+9	0	1+2	0	6+3	0
19	DF	(Albania) ALB	Berat Djimsiti	47	1	29+5	0	3	1	8+2	0
23	DF	(Bosnia and Herzegovina) BIH	Sead Kolašinac	28	0	15+4	0	3	0	5+1	0
42	DF	(Italy) ITA	Giorgio Scalvini	30	3	23+1	3	3	0	2+1	0
47	DF	(Italy) ITA	Lorenzo Bernasconi	37	0	17+6	0	3+1	0	10	0
69	DF	(Nigeria) NGR	Honest Ahanor	34	1	15+7	0	1+2	1	3+6	0
77	DF	(Italy) ITA	Davide Zappacosta	48	4	30+5	3	3	0	8+2	1
Midfielders
6	MF	(United States) USA	Yunus Musah	27	2	4+15	1	0+1	1	2+5	0
7	MF	(Ghana) GHA	Kamaldeen Sulemana	37	3	9+16	2	1+2	1	2+7	0
8	MF	(Croatia) CRO	Mario Pašalić	46	10	21+12	3	2+2	4	6+3	3
10	MF	(Serbia) SRB	Lazar Samardžić	38	6	11+15	2	1+1	0	2+8	4
13	MF	(Brazil) BRA	Éderson	41	3	26+4	2	2	0	9	1
15	MF	(Netherlands) NED	Marten de Roon	50	2	32+2	1	4	1	10+2	0
17	MF	(Belgium) BEL	Charles De Ketelaere	42	5	26+5	3	3	0	7+1	2
59	MF	(Poland) POL	Nicola Zalewski	42	2	24+9	2	3	0	4+2	0
Forwards
9	FW	(Italy) ITA	Gianluca Scamacca	38	14	16+8	10	2+2	1	7+3	3
18	FW	(Italy) ITA	Giacomo Raspadori	16	3	7+6	3	1+1	0	0+1	0
90	FW	(Montenegro) MNE	Nikola Krstović	48	11	18+15	10	2+1	0	5+7	1
Players transferred/loaned out during the season
11	FW	(Nigeria) NGR	Ademola Lookman	19	3	9+3	2	0	0	6+1	1
44	MF	(Italy) ITA	Marco Brescianini	12	1	0+9	1	0+1	0	0+2	0
70	FW	(Italy) ITA	Daniel Maldini	11	0	3+6	0	0+1	0	1	0

Source: Competitions

=== Goalscorers ===
Rank	No.	Pos.	Nat.	Player	Serie A	Coppa Italia	Champions League	Total
1	9	FW	(Italy)	Gianluca Scamacca	10	1	3	14
2	90	FW	(Montenegro)	Nikola Krstović	10	0	1	11
3	8	MF	(Croatia)	Mario Pašalić	3	4	3	10
4	10	MF	(Serbia)	Lazar Samardžić	2	0	4	6
5	17	MF	(Belgium)	Charles De Ketelaere	3	0	2	5
6	77	DF	(Italy)	Davide Zappacosta	3	0	1	4
7	7	MF	(Ghana)	Kamaldeen Sulemana	2	1	0	3
7	11	FW	(Nigeria)	Ademola Lookman	2	0	1	3
7	13	MF	(Brazil)	Éderson	2	0	1	3
7	18	FW	(Italy)	Giacomo Raspadori	3	0	0	3
7	42	DF	(Italy)	Giorgio Scalvini	3	0	0	3
12	6	MF	(United States)	Yunus Musah	1	1	0	2
12	15	MF	(Netherlands)	Marten de Roon	1	1	0	2
12	59	MF	(Poland)	Nicola Zalewski	2	0	0	2
15	3	DF	(Ivory Coast)	Odilon Kossounou	1	0	0	1
15	4	DF	(Sweden)	Isak Hien	1	0	0	1
15	19	DF	(Albania)	Berat Djimsiti	0	1	0	1
15	44	MF	(Italy)	Marco Brescianini	1	0	0	1
15	69	DF	(Nigeria)	Honest Ahanor	0	1	0	1
Own goals					1	0	0	1
Totals					51	10	16	77
