= Brandon Soppy =

French / Jamaican / Cameroon footballer (born 2002)

Personal information
- Full name: Brandon Soppy
- Date of birth: 21 February 2002 (age 24)
- Place of birth: Aubervilliers, France
- Height: 1.81 m (5 ft 11 in)
- Position: Right-back

Team information
- Current team: Lausanne-Sport
- Number: 2

Youth career
- 2011–2017: CFF Paris
- 2017–2020: Rennes

Senior career*
| Years | Team | Apps | (Gls) |
| 2018–2021 | Rennes II | 12 | (0) |
| 2020–2021 | Rennes | 10 | (0) |
| 2021–2022 | Udinese | 29 | (0) |
| 2022–2025 | Atalanta | 15 | (0) |
| 2023–2024 | → Torino (loan) | 5 | (0) |
| 2024 | → Schalke 04 (loan) | 5 | (0) |
| 2024–2025 | → Atalanta U23 | 8 | (0) |
| 2025– | Lausanne-Sport | 39 | (0) |

International career
| 2017–2018 | France U16 | 7 | (0) |
| 2018–2019 | France U17 | 16 | (2) |
| 2019 | France U18 | 11 | (0) |
| 2022 | France U20 | 1 | (0) |
Medal record
Men's football
Representing France
FIFA U-17 World Cup
| Third place | 2019 Brazil |
UEFA European Under-17 Championship
| Bronze medal – third place | 2019 Ireland |
- * Club domestic league appearances and goals as of 28 September 2026

Beanou-Junior Brandon Deflorent Soppy (born 21 February 2002) is a French professional footballer who plays as right-back for Swiss Super League club Lausanne-Sport.

== Club career ==
=== Early career ===
Soppy began playing football at Bobigny, before joining CFFP aged 12–13. He moved to INF Clairefontaine, and later signed for Rennes's youth academy.

=== Rennes ===
Soppy signed his first professional contract with Rennes aged 16; the following year, he played for their reserve team in the Championnat National 3. In August 2020, Soppy made his Ligue 1 debut aged 18, in a 2–2 draw against Lille.

=== Udinese ===
In summer 2021, Soppy joined Udinese in the Serie A; he played 30 games during the 2021–22 season: 28 in Serie A and two in the Coppa Italia.

=== Atalanta ===
On 19 August 2022, Soppy joined fellow Serie A side Atalanta.

==== Loan to Torino ====
He then moved to Torino on a season-long loan on 31 August 2023.

==== Loan to Schalke 04 ====
On 1 February 2024, he was loaned to German club Schalke 04 until the end of the season.

=== Lausanne ===
On 11 July 2025, Soppy signed a three-year contract with Lausanne-Sport in Switzerland.

== Style of play ==
Initially a centre-back, Soppy moved to right-back at the end of his first year at Rennes. He is known for his direct style of play and crossing ability.

== Career statistics ==
As of 27 September 2024

Appearances and goals by club, season and competition
| Club | Season | League | | | Cup | | Europe | | Total | |
| Club | Season | Division | Apps | Goals | Apps | Goals | Apps | Goals | Apps | Goals |
|---|---|---|---|---|---|---|---|---|---|---|
| Rennes II | 2018–19 | National 3 | 1 | 0 | — | | — | | 1 | 0 |
| Rennes II | 2019–20 | National 3 | 10 | 0 | — | | — | | 10 | 0 |
| Rennes II | 2020–21 | National 3 | 1 | 0 | — | | — | | 1 | 0 |
| Rennes II | Total | | 12 | 0 | — | | — | | 12 | 0 |
| Rennes | 2020–21 | Ligue 1 | 10 | 0 | 0 | 0 | 2 (Note: Appearances in UEFA Champions League) | 0 | 12 | 0 |
| Udinese | 2021–22 | Serie A | 28 | 0 | 2 | 0 | — | | 30 | 0 |
| Udinese | 2022–23 | Serie A | 1 | 0 | 1 | 0 | — | | 2 | 0 |
| Udinese | Total | | 29 | 0 | 3 | 0 | — | | 32 | 0 |
| Atalanta | 2022–23 | Serie A | 15 | 0 | 1 | 0 | — | | 16 | 0 |
| Atalanta | 2024–25 | Serie A | 0 | 0 | 0 | 0 | — | | 0 | 0 |
| Atalanta | Total | | 15 | 0 | 1 | 0 | — | | 16 | 0 |
| Torino (loan) | 2023–24 | Serie A | 5 | 0 | 0 | 0 | — | | 5 | 0 |
| Schalke 04 (loan) | 2023–24 | 2. Bundesliga | 5 | 0 | — | | — | | 5 | 0 |
| Career total | | | 76 | 0 | 4 | 0 | 2 | 0 | 82 | 0 |
