= Lorenzo Bernasconi =

Italian footballer (born 2003)

Personal information
- Full name: Lorenzo Bernasconi
- Date of birth: 16 November 2003 (age 22)
- Place of birth: Crema, Italy
- Height: 1.90 m (6 ft 3 in)
- Position: Left wing-back

Team information
- Current team: Atalanta
- Number: 47

Youth career
- –2021: Cremonese
- 2021–2023: → Atalanta (loan)

Senior career*
Years	Team	Apps	(Gls)
2020–2024	Cremonese	0	(0)
2023	→ Atalanta (loan)	0	(0)
2023–2024	→ Atalanta U23 (loan)	20	(1)
2024–	Atalanta	23	(0)
2024–2025	→ Atalanta U23 (loan)	35	(3)
- * Club domestic league appearances and goals as of 18 April 2026

Lorenzo Bernasconi (born 16 November 2003) is an Italian professional footballer who plays as a left wing-back for Serie A club Atalanta.

== Early life ==
Bernasconi was born on 16 November 2003. Born in Italy, he is a native of Crema, Italy.

== Career ==
As a youth player, Bernasconi joined the youth academy of Cremonese and was promoted to the club's senior team in 2020.

Following his stint there, he joined the youth academy of Serie A side Atalanta during the summer of 2021 and was promoted to the club's senior team in 2023.

== Style of play ==
Bernasconi plays as a defender and is left-footed. Italian news website Gianluca di Marzio wrote in 2025 that he is a "versatile and modern player, Bernasconi can play as a midfielder, full-back, and even as a central defender when needed".

== Career statistics ==
=== Club ===
As of match played 22 April 2026

Appearances and goals by club, season and competition
Club	Season	League			National cup		Europe		Other		Total	
Club	Season	Division	Apps	Goals	Apps	Goals	Apps	Goals	Apps	Goals	Apps	Goals
Atalanta U23 (loan)	2023–24	Serie C	20	1	1	0	—		4 (Note: Appearances in Serie B promotion play-offs)	0	25	1
Atalanta U23 (loan)	2024–25	Serie C	35	3	1	0	—		6	0	42	3
Atalanta U23 (loan)	Total		55	4	2	0	0	0	10	0	67	4
Atalanta	2025–26	Serie A	23	0	4	0	10 (Note: Appearances in UEFA Champions League)	0	—		37	0
Career total			78	4	6	0	10	0	10	0	104	4
