= Honest Ahanor =

Italian footballer (born 2008)

Personal information
- Full name: Honest Ahanor
- Date of birth: 23 February 2008 (age 18)
- Place of birth: Aversa, Italy
- Height: 1.84 m (6 ft 0 in)
- Positions: Centre-back; left-back; left wing-back

Team information
- Current team: Crystal Palace (on loan from Atalanta)
- Number: 21

Youth career
- –2024: Genoa

Senior career*
Years	Team	Apps	(Gls)
2024–2025	Genoa	6	(0)
2025–	Atalanta	22	(0)
2026–	→ Crystal Palace (loan)	3	(0)

International career^{‡}
2026–	Italy U21	2	(0)
2026–	Italy	2	(0)
- * Club domestic league appearances and goals as of 16:00, 11 October 2026 (UTC) ‡ National team caps and goals as of 23:45, 5 October 2026 (UTC)

Honest Ahanor (born 23 February 2008) is an Italian professional footballer who plays as a centre-back, left-back or left wing-back for Premier League club Crystal Palace, on loan from Serie A club Atalanta, and the Italy national team. He will join Premier League club Chelsea in July 2027.

== Club career ==
Ahanor was born on 23 February 2008 in Aversa, Italy. He has regarded former Italian international Paolo Maldini as his footballing idol.

=== Genoa ===
As a youth player, Ahanor joined the youth academy of Italian side Genoa. During the 2023–24 season, he played for the club's under-15, under-16, and under-17 teams. He helped the team secure a 2–2 draw against Napoli on 11 May, 2025, scoring the first goal after a cross from Junior Messias which Ahanor headed on the post and got the ball to bounce on Napoli’s goalkeeper Alex Meret’s thigh and into the back of the net.

=== Atalanta ===
On 4 July 2025, Ahanor signed with Serie A club Atalanta for a reported fee of €16 million, plus €4 million in bonuses. He signed a three-year contract with the club, the maximum length allowed as he is under 18 years old. On 30 September, Ahanor made his Champions League debut, starting and playing the full 90 minutes in a 2–1 win against Club Brugge. On 1 September 2026, it was announced that Ahanor would join Premier League club Chelsea in the summer of 2027.

==== Loan to Crystal Palace ====
On 1 September 2026, Atalanta sent him to Premier League side Crystal Palace on a season-long loan deal. He made his full debut for the club on 8 September 2026, starting in a 3–0 home win over Middlesbrough in the third round of the EFL Cup.

== International career ==
Until his 18th birthday, Ahanor was eligible to play solely for Nigeria. The son of Nigerian parents, Ahanor moved from Campania to Genoa at the age of one and developed entirely within the Italian football system. Despite being Italian by upbringing and cultural identity, he has never been eligible to represent Italy at youth level. Under current Italian law, children born in Italy to foreign parents cannot automatically acquire citizenship. They may apply only after turning 18, provided they have lived in the country continuously and legally. Ahanor’s case has reignited debate over Italy’s citizenship rules for second-generation immigrants. After turning 18 and applying for Italian citizenship, he then received his first call-up for Italy U21 on 20 March 2026 by head coach Silvio Baldini.

In May 2026, Ahanor was one of the players who were called up with the Italy national senior squad by interim head coach Silvio Baldini, for the friendly matches against Luxembourg and Greece on 3 and 7 June 2026, respectively.

== Style of play ==
A left-footed defender, Ahanor has mainly been seen as a left-back, but can operate as a left sided centre-back depending on the formation a team plays and has also filled in as a wing-back. His versatility has seen him occasionally deployed as a central midfielder or winger. He is known for his pace and athleticism in carrying the ball forwards.

== Career statistics ==
=== Club ===
As of match played 28 October 2026

Appearances and goals by club, season and competition
Club	Season	League			National cup (Note: Includes Coppa Italia, FA Cup)		League cup (Note: Includes EFL Cup)		Europe		Total	
Club	Season	Division	Apps	Goals	Apps	Goals	Apps	Goals	Apps	Goals	Apps	Goals
Genoa	2024–25	Serie A	6	0	0	0	—		—		6	0
Atalanta	2025–26	Serie A	22	0	4	1	—		9 (Note: Appearances in UEFA Champions League)	0	35	1
Crystal Palace (loan)	2026–27	Premier League	3	0	0	0	2	0	1 (Note: Appearances in UEFA Europa League)	0	6	0
Career total			31	0	4	1	2	0	10	0	47	1

=== International ===
As of match played 7 June 2026

Appearances and goals by national team and year
National team	Year	Apps	Goals
Italy	2026	2	0
Total		2	0
