= Tupković Gornji =

- Village
- Location within Bosnia and Herzegovina
- Coordinates: 44.4010°N 18.7978°E
- Country: Bosnia and Herzegovina
- Entity: Federation of Bosnia and Herzegovina
- Canton: Tuzla
- Municipality: Živinice

Area
  - Total: 3.35 sq mi (8.67 km^{2})

Population (2013)
  - Total: 1,280
  - Density: 382/sq mi (148/km^{2})
- Time zone: UTC+1 (CET)
  - Summer (DST): UTC+2 (CEST)

Tupković Gornji is a village in the municipality of Živinice, Bosnia and Herzegovina.

== Demographics ==
According to the 2013 census, its population was 1,280.

Ethnicity in 2013
Ethnicity	Number	Percentage
Bosniaks	1,277	99.8%
Croats	1	0.1%
Serbs	2	0.2%
Total	1,280	100%
