= Marten de Roon =

Dutch footballer (born 1991)

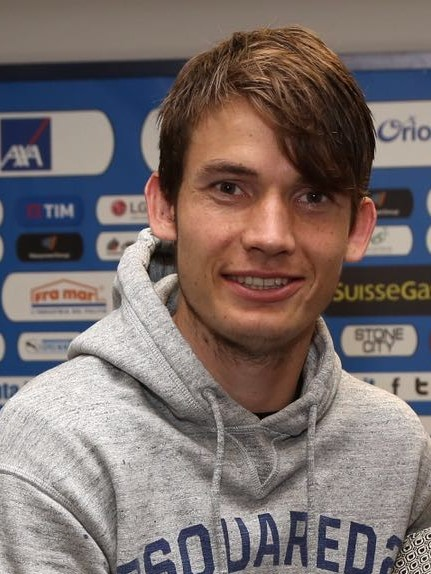
- De Roon in 2016

Personal information
- Full name: Marten Elco de Roon
- Date of birth: 29 March 1991 (age 35)
- Place of birth: Zwijndrecht, Netherlands
- Height: 1.86 m (6 ft 1 in)
- Position: Defensive midfielder

Team information
- Current team: Roma
- Number: 15

Youth career
- 1997–1999: ASWH
- 1999–2006: Feyenoord
- 2006–2010: Sparta Rotterdam

Senior career*
Years	Team	Apps	(Gls)
2010–2012	Sparta Rotterdam	58	(2)
2012–2015	Heerenveen	94	(5)
2015–2016	Atalanta	36	(1)
2016–2017	Middlesbrough	34	(4)
2017–2026	Atalanta	304	(19)
2026–	Roma	8	(0)

International career^{‡}
2009	Netherlands U19	3	(1)
2016–	Netherlands	44	(1)
Medal record
Men's football
Representing Netherlands
UEFA Nations League
Silver medal – second place	2019 Portugal
- * Club domestic league appearances and goals as of 15:09, 7 November 2026 (UTC) ‡ National team caps and goals as of 30 June 2026

Marten Elco de Roon (born 29 March 1991) is a Dutch professional footballer who plays as a defensive midfielder for Serie A club Roma and the Netherlands national team.

After representing various Dutch youth teams, he started his career at Sparta Rotterdam, and also played for SC Heerenveen in his home country before moving to Italian club Atalanta in 2015. He also played for English club Middlesbrough before rejoining Atalanta in 2017. He was a part of the team that won the UEFA Europa League in 2024 despite being injured, and became Atalanta's all-time appearance maker two years later.

De Roon is a Dutch international, having played for the Netherlands at the U19 level before making his senior debut for the Netherlands in 2016. He was named in the Dutch squads for the UEFA Euro 2020, 2022 FIFA World Cup and the 2026 FIFA World Cup.

== Early life ==
De Roon was born in Zwijndrecht and raised in Hendrik-Ido-Ambacht, where he played in youth teams of ASWH. From ASWH, he continued to youth teams of Feyenoord and Sparta Rotterdam.

== Club career ==
=== Sparta Rotterdam ===
De Roon made his Eredivisie debut for Sparta Rotterdam on 27 March 2010, starting in the match against Twente at De Grolsch Veste. He made a total of three appearances in the Eredivisie for the 2009–10 season.

=== Heerenveen ===
In April 2012, Eredivisie club SC Heerenveen announced the signing of De Roon on a three-year contract.

=== Atalanta ===
In July 2015, De Roon was signed by Serie A side Atalanta. Later that year, on 6 December, he scored his first Serie A goal for the club in a 3–0 victory Palermo.

=== Middlesbrough ===
On 4 July 2016, De Roon signed for newly-promoted Premier League side Middlesbrough for a reported £12 million transfer fee. He scored his first goal for his new club – a 91st-minute equaliser – on 5 November 2016 in a 1–1 draw with Manchester City at the Etihad Stadium. He went on to score a further 3 league goals for the club over the remainder of the season, including the only goal in a victory over Sunderland in the Tees–Wear derby, however Middlesbrough were relegated on 8 May 2017. On 18 July 2017, Middlesbrough confirmed that they paid £8.8 million for De Roon, with Atalanta earning another £900,000 after the midfielder played 30 games for the club.

=== Return to Atalanta ===
On 10 August 2017, De Roon re-signed for Atalanta for an undisclosed fee. He once again cemented himself as a starter under Gian Piero Gasperini, and helped Atalanta finish in a historic 3rd place in the 2018–19 season, earning them a spot in the 2019–20 UEFA Champions League group stage. He also scored a volley against Fiorentina in the Coppa Italia semi-finals in the 58th minute. Atalanta would win the tie 5–4, though lost in the final against Lazio. He made his Champions League debut on 18 September 2019 against Dinamo Zagreb.

In the 2023–24 season, De Roon frequently captained his team and marked a milestone by playing his 250th Serie A match in a 3–0 away victory over Empoli, becoming the first foreign player to reach this achievement at the club. On 15 May 2024, he suffered a knee injury during the Coppa Italia final against Juventus, which resulted in a 1–0 defeat. This injury also sidelined him for the Europa League final, where his team secured their first-ever title in the competition with a 3–0 win over Bayer Leverkusen.

On 22 March 2026, De Roon made his 436th appearance for Atalanta in a 1–0 home win against Hellas Verona, surpassing former captain Gianpaolo Bellini as the club's all-time record appearance maker.

=== Roma ===
On 30 August 2026, De Roon joined fellow Serie A club Roma for €850,000 on a one-year contract.

== International career ==
De Roon has represented the Netherlands under-19 national team in the qualification rounds for the 2010 UEFA European Under-19 Football Championship. On 12 November 2009, he made his debut and scored his first goal for the U-19 Oranje in a qualification match against Malta. On 13 November 2016, De Roon made his debut for the senior team in a 2018 FIFA World Cup qualification against Luxembourg.

De Roon was later named in the first Dutch squad chosen by new national team manager Ronald Koeman. This was in March 2018 for the friendly matches against England and Portugal.

On 26 May 2021, De Roon was named in the 26-man Dutch squad for the postponed UEFA Euro 2020.

On 11 November 2022, he was called up for the 2022 FIFA World Cup in Qatar. Two years later, De Roon missed the UEFA Euro 2024 due to a knee injury.

On 27 May 2026, De Roon was named in the Netherlands' squad for the 2026 FIFA World Cup.

== Career statistics ==
=== Club ===
As of match played 7 November 2026

Appearances and goals by club, season and competition
Club	Season	League			National cup (Note: Includes KNVB Cup, Coppa Italia, FA Cup)		Europe		Other		Total	
Club	Season	Division	Apps	Goals	Apps	Goals	Apps	Goals	Apps	Goals	Apps	Goals
Sparta Rotterdam	2009–10	Eredivisie	3	0	0	0	—		1 (Note: Appearance in Eredivisie relegation play-offs)	0	4	0
Sparta Rotterdam	2010–11	Eerste Divisie	27	0	1	0	—		0	0	28	0
Sparta Rotterdam	2011–12	Eerste Divisie	28	2	3	0	—		2 (Note: Appearances in Eerste Divisie promotion play-offs)	0	33	2
Sparta Rotterdam	Total		58	2	4	0	—		3	0	65	2
Heerenveen	2012–13	Eredivisie	26	1	2	0	4 (Note: Appearances in UEFA Europa League)	1	—		32	2
Heerenveen	2013–14	Eredivisie	32	3	3	0	—		—		35	3
Heerenveen	2014–15	Eredivisie	36	1	1	0	—		—		37	1
Heerenveen	Total		94	5	6	0	4	1	—		104	6
Atalanta	2015–16	Serie A	36	1	1	1	—		—		37	2
Middlesbrough	2016–17	Premier League	33	4	2	1	—		—		35	5
Middlesbrough	2017–18	Championship	1	0	—		—		—		1	0
Middlesbrough	Total		34	4	2	1	—		—		36	5
Atalanta	2017–18	Serie A	34	3	4	0	8	0	—		46	3
Atalanta	2018–19	Serie A	35	2	4	1	5	0	—		44	3
Atalanta	2019–20	Serie A	35	2	1	0	9 (Note: Appearances in UEFA Champions League)	0	—		45	2
Atalanta	2020–21	Serie A	35	1	5	0	6	0	—		46	1
Atalanta	2021–22	Serie A	30	3	2	0	12 (Note: Six appearances in UEFA Champions League, five appearances in UEFA Europa League)	0	—		44	3
Atalanta	2022–23	Serie A	35	3	2	0	—		—		37	3
Atalanta	2023–24	Serie A	30	0	5	0	11	0	—		46	0
Atalanta	2024–25	Serie A	36	4	2	0	10	0	2 (Note: One appearance in UEFA Super Cup, one appearance in Supercoppa Italiana)	0	50	4
Atalanta	2025–26	Serie A	34	1	4	1	12	0	—		50	2
Atalanta	Total		304	19	29	2	73	0	2	0	408	21
Roma	2026–27	Serie A	8	0	0	0	4	1	—		12	1
Career total			534	31	42	4	81	2	5	0	662	37

=== International ===
As of match played 29 June 2026

Appearances and goals by national team and year
National team	Year	Apps	Goals
Netherlands	2016	1	0
Netherlands	2017	1	0
Netherlands	2018	6	0
Netherlands	2019	8	0
Netherlands	2020	4	0
Netherlands	2021	8	0
Netherlands	2022	7	0
Netherlands	2023	6	1
Netherlands	2024	1	0
Netherlands	2025	0	0
Netherlands	2026	2	0
Total		44	1

Netherlands score listed first, score column indicates score after each De Roon goal.

List of international goals scored by Marten de Roon
No.	Date	Venue	Cap	Opponent	Score	Result	Competition
1	7 September 2023	Philips Stadion, Eindhoven, Netherlands	38	Greece	1–0	3–0	UEFA Euro 2024 qualifying

== Honours ==
Atalanta

- UEFA Europa League: 2023–24

Netherlands

- UEFA Nations League runner-up: 2018–19
