= Riccardo Pinzi =

Italian footballer

Personal information
- Date of birth: 17 August 2003 (age 23)
- Height: 1.86 m (6 ft 1 in)
- Position: Midfielder

Team information
- Current team: Fermana
- Number: 23

Youth career
- Udinese

Senior career*
Years	Team	Apps	(Gls)
2022	Udinese	1	(0)
2022–	Fermana	43	(1)
2024	→ Pro Vercelli (loan)	5	(0)
- * Club domestic league appearances and goals as of 3 May 2024

Riccardo Pinzi (born 17 August 2003) is an Italian footballer who plays as a midfielder for Eccellenza club Fermana.

== Club career ==
On 20 August 2022 Pinzi signed with Fermana.

On 1 February 2024, Pinzi moved to Pro Vercelli on loan.

== Personal life ==
Pinzi is the son of former Udinese player and Italy international Giampiero Pinzi.

== Club statistics ==
=== Club ===
As of 22 May 2022.

Club	Season	League			Cup		Other		Total	
Club	Season	Division	Apps	Goals	Apps	Goals	Apps	Goals	Apps	Goals
Udinese	2021–22	Serie A	1	0	0	0	0	0	1	0
Career total			1	0	0	0	0	0	1	0
