= Pedro Irastorza =

Spanish footballer (1918–1991)

Personal information
- Full name: Pedro Irastorza Ayerbe
- Date of birth: 22 April 1918
- Place of birth: Zaldibia, Gipuzkoa, Spain
- Date of death: 1991
- Position: Defender

Senior career*
Years	Team	Apps	(Gls)
1933–1935	Donostia	16	(0)
1935–1941	Osasuna	41	(0)
1941–1942	Real Sociedad	7	(0)
1942–1943	Murcia	12	(0)
- * Club domestic league appearances and goals

Pedro Irastorza Ayerbe (22 April 1918 – 1991) was a Spanish footballer who played as a defender for Real Sociedad. He is best known for being the third youngest player in the history of La Liga, having featured in a league match for Sociedad in 1934 at the age of 15.

== Biography ==
Born in Zaldibia, Gipuzkoa, Irastorza began his football career in the youth departments of his local club, Real Sociedad, which was renamed as Donostia Club de Futbol in 1931 with the advent of the Second Spanish Republic.

Irastorza made his official competitive debut for the first team on matchday 14 of the 1933–34 La Liga, starting in a 4–0 loss to FC Barcelona at the Camp de Les Corts on 4 February 1934, and in doing so at the age of 15 years and 288 days, he not only became the youngest player in the club's history (a record that he still holds), but also the youngest in La Liga's then-short history, becoming the first-ever under 16 player to feature in the Spanish top-flight. He held this record for just five years, until it was broken by Sansón, who debuted in 1939, aged 15 years and 255 days. Irastorza is currently the third youngest player in the Spanish top-flight, hedging out by just one day the fourth-placed Óscar Ramón, who also made his debut at the home of FC Barcelona, and also in a 4–0 loss. Donostia's coach, Harry Lowe, decided to give this debut to Irastorza because he had been impressed by his performances in the youth teams. The chronicles of the time say that he was a "very brave" midfielder, despite his age.

Irastorza had to wait seven months for his next competitive first-team match, which finally came on 16 September in a Copa Vasca match against Alavés. He became a regular for Donostia in the league in 1935, playing 14 matches between January and April, most notably in a 7–1 loss to Valencia at the Mestalla Stadium on 24 March 1935, where the 16-year-old Irastorza played alongside his 48-year-old coach Harry Lowe, who thus became the oldest player in La Liga that day. The age difference between them was 31 years and 255 days, which remains the biggest age difference between partners in La Liga's history. However, Irastorza was the more experienced one between the two of them since he had already played over 10 league matches while Lowe was making his competitive debut in Spanish football. In fact, Lowe's appearance in the game was nothing more than an emergency as Donostia went to Valencia with only 11 men and then one of them got injured just before the kick-off, so Lowe was forced to include himself in the line-up.

At the end of the 1934–35 season, Donostia was relegated to the Segunda División, so Irastorza left the club, but not before making his Copa del Rey debut against Real Unión in the first leg of the fifth round of the 1935 Copa del Presidente de la República; he also played the second leg and a tiebreaker in an eventual loss. He played for Osasuna until the Spanish Civil War broke out. Afterwards, he continued playing there until his return to Real Sociedad in the 1941–42 season. He retired in the following season playing for Murcia.

In total, Irastorza played 33 matches for Real Sociedad; 22 in La Liga, 8 in the Copa Vasca and 3 in the Copa del Rey; but failed to score a single goal. He left the club with a record of 9 wins, 2 draws, and 22 losses. Aged 15 years and 288 days, Irastorza remains the youngest player in the history of Real Sociedad to play in La Liga, and by quite some distance, since the player who came the closest to breaking this record, Ander Barrenetxea, debuted at the age of 16 years and 359 days.
