= Óscar Ramón =

Spanish footballer

Personal information
- Full name: Óscar Ramón Pellicer
- Date of birth: 25 November 1968
- Place of birth: Zaragoza, Spain
- Position: Midfielder

Senior career*
Years	Team	Apps	(Gls)
1984–1985	Real Zaragoza		
1989–1990	Atlético Madrileño		
1990–1991	Talavera		
1991–1992	Fuenlabrada		
1992–1993	Rayo Majadahonda		
- * Club domestic league appearances and goals

Óscar Ramón Pellicer (25 November 1968) is a Spanish former footballer who played as a midfielder for Real Zaragoza and Atlético Madrileño, the reserve team of Atlético Madrid. He is best known for being the fourth youngest player in the history of La Liga, having featured in a league match for Zaragoza in 1984 at the age of 15.

== Biography ==
Born in Zaragoza, Ramón began his football career in the youth departments of his hometown club, Real Zaragoza. He made his official competitive debut for the first team on matchday 2 of the 1984–85 La Liga, entering the field in the 83rd minute of an eventual 4–0 loss to FC Barcelona at the Camp Nou on 9 September 1984, and in doing so at the age of 15 years and 289 days, he not only became the youngest player in the club's history (a record that he still holds), but also the then third youngest player in La Liga's history, after Sansón (15 years and 255 days) and Pedro Irastorza (15 years and 288 days), who had both achieved this feat in the 1930s, with the latter having also made his debut at the home of FC Barcelona, and also in a 4–0 loss. This match was played with youth and amateur players from both teams due to an ongoing strike caused by professional players in order to protect their image rights by intervening in television agreements, and in fact, Ramón was only called up by the first team due to the 1984 footballers' strike for which Zaragoza went to the Camp Nou with youth players.

Ramón would later play in the Segunda División with Atlético Madrileño, the reserve team of Atlético Madrid, but for only one season, as he was unable to hold down a place. He then began bouncing around in the lower tiers of Spanish football, going on a journey through minor teams in the community of Madrid such as Talavera, Fuenlabrada, and Rayo Majadahonda, where he retired at the end of the 1992–93 season, at the age of 24.

He was a basketball coach at the Jesús Maestro school in Madrid.
