= Luka Romero =

Argentine footballer (born 2004)

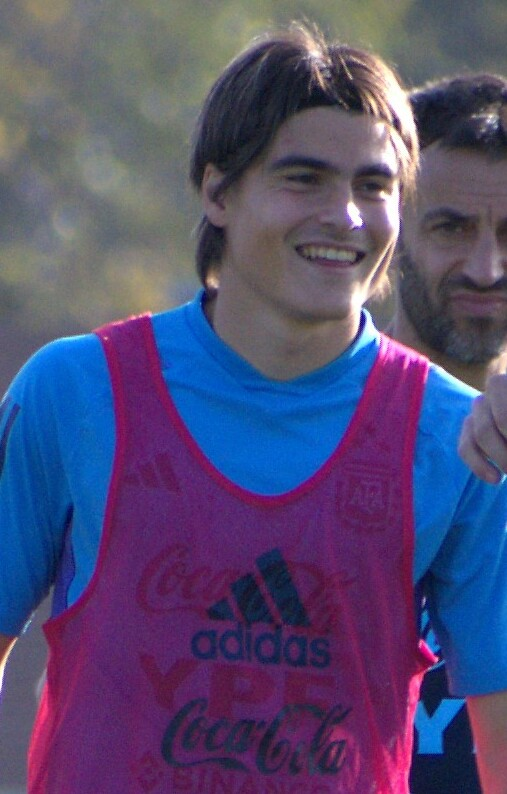
- Romero training with Argentina U20 in 2023

Personal information
- Full name: Luka Romero Bezzana
- Date of birth: 18 November 2004 (age 21)
- Place of birth: Durango, Mexico
- Height: 1.69 m (5 ft 7 in)
- Positions: Attacking midfielder; winger

Team information
- Current team: Cruz Azul
- Number: 18

Youth career
- Formentera
- 2011–2015: Sant Jordi
- 2015–2020: Mallorca

Senior career*
Years	Team	Apps	(Gls)
2020–2021	Mallorca	7	(1)
2020–2021	Mallorca B	15	(2)
2021–2023	Lazio	14	(1)
2023–2025	AC Milan	4	(0)
2024	→ Almería (loan)	13	(3)
2024–2025	→ Alavés (loan)	6	(0)
2025–	Cruz Azul	69	(6)

International career
2019	Argentina U15	6	(2)
2019	Argentina U16	1	(0)
2019–2020	Argentina U17	2	(0)
2022	Argentina U20	9	(2)
- * Club domestic league appearances and goals as of 7 November 2026

Luka Romero Bezzana (born 18 November 2004) is a professional footballer who plays as an attacking midfielder and winger for Liga MX club Cruz Azul. Born in Mexico, he represented Argentina at the youth international level.

Coming through the youth system, Romero made his first-team debut with Mallorca in La Liga aged 15 years and 219 days, becoming the youngest player to play in a top five European league. After alternating in 2020–21 between Mallorca's first team and B team, Romero joined Serie A side Lazio in 2021. His first goal in 2022 made him the first 2004-born player to score in the Italian top flight. He joined AC Milan on a free transfer in 2023.

== Early life ==
Native to Victoria de Durango, Mexico, to Argentine parents, Romero moved to Villanueva de Córdoba, Andalusia, Spain, at the age of three. He moved to Formentera, Balearic Islands at the age of seven, and started to play at Ibiza-based Sant Jordi.

In 2011, Romero had a trial with Barcelona, but could not sign as he was under the age of 10 and did not live in the area. In 2015, at the age of ten, he signed an eight-year youth contract with Mallorca. In his first four years, Romero scored 230 goals in 108 matches.

== Club career ==
=== Mallorca ===
Romero was called up to train with the main squad of Mallorca by manager Vicente Moreno on 5 June 2020. Eleven days later, he was included in the list for a La Liga match against Villarreal after being given special authorization at the age of 15 years and 221 days, but remained an unused substitute in the 1–0 away loss. Romero played his first match with Mallorca on 24 June, replacing Iddrisu Baba late into a 0–2 away defeat against Real Madrid. Aged 15 years and 219 days, he broke Sansón's record for the youngest player to ever play a professional match in La Liga. He also broke the age record for the five top European leagues which was held by Kalman Gerencseri since 1960.

Romero started the 2020–21 campaign with the main squad, but also appeared with the reserves in Tercera División on some occasions. He scored his first senior goals on 1 November, netting a brace with the B-side in a 3–0 away win against Llosetense. Romero scored his first professional goal on 29 November, netting the fourth in a 4–0 Segunda División home routing of Logroñés.

=== Lazio ===
On 19 August 2021, Romero was signed by Serie A club Lazio. On the opening day of the 2021–22 season, he became Lazio's youngest ever player when he made his debut at the age of 16 years, 9 months and 10 days in their 6–1 victory over Spezia. On 17 October, Romero was included in The Guardian's 60 best young talents in world football born in 2004. He scored his first goal for Lazio on 10 November 2022, the winner of a 1–0 win against Monza, becoming the first player born in 2004 to score in Serie A.

=== AC Milan ===
On 6 July 2023, AC Milan announced the signing of Romero on a free transfer, with contract until 30 June 2027.

On 24 July 2023, Romero made his debut for Milan in a friendly game against Real Madrid at the Rose Bowl, scoring a goal from outside the penalty area, making the score 2–0 in the eventual 3–2 loss for Milan. Despite the promising start, however, Romero's playing opportunities quickly diminished as the club signed Christian Pulisic, Noah Okafor and Samuel Chukwueze in the same month as Romero, and changed the primary starting line-up formation from a 4–2–3–1, in which Romero may play either centrally as an attacking midfielder or as an inverted winger on the right, to a 4–3–3, wherein Romero can only play in the latter position.

On 27 September 2023, Romero played his first competitive game for Milan, a 3–1 away win against Cagliari, in which he came on as a substitute for Christian Pulisic in the second half.

==== Loan to Almería ====
On 22 January 2024, Romero returned to Spain and joined La Liga club Almería on loan until the end of the 2023–24 season. On 24 February, he scored a brace in a 2–2 draw against Atlético Madrid.

==== Loan to Alavés ====
On 23 July 2024, Romero moved to fellow La Liga side Alavés on loan for the entire 2024–25 campaign. His loan-spell was cut short and he returned to AC Milan after six months on 17 January 2025.

=== Cruz Azul ===
On 18 January 2025, Romero moved to Mexico, the country where he was born and joined Liga MX club Cruz Azul, for an estimated €3.3 million fee, signing a five-year contract. On 25 January 2025, Romero made his debut for Cruz Azul in a 1–1 draw against Puebla, replacing Ángel Sepúlveda in the second half. He scored his first goal for Cruz Azul on 31 January 2025, netting the first of a 3–2 away win against Tijuana.

== International career ==
Born in Mexico to an Argentine family, he moved to Spain at a young age. Romero holds all three passports, and is currently eligible to represent all three senior national teams. He represented Argentina internationally at under-15 level in the 2019 South American U-15 Championship, where they finished runners-up, scoring two goals in six matches. In March 2020, Romero was called up to represent Argentina's under-17s at the Montaigu Tournament, but the competition was cancelled due to the COVID-19 pandemic.

Romero received his first-ever call up to Argentina's senior team by manager Lionel Scaloni in March 2022. On 26 March 2022, Romero played for the under-20 team in a 2–2 draw against the United States U20s.

On 3 May 2023, Romero was included in the Argentina U20 squad that took part in the 2023 FIFA U-20 World Cup, which took place in Argentina. They were knocked out in the round of 16 by Nigeria U20.

== Personal life ==
Romero's father, Diego, was a professional footballer. His twin brother Tobías is also a footballer, and plays as a goalkeeper.

== Career statistics ==
As of match played on 7 November 2026

Appearances and goals by club, season and competition
Club	Season	League			National cup (Note: Includes Copa del Rey, Coppa Italia)		Continental		Other		Total	
Club	Season	Division	Apps	Goals	Apps	Goals	Apps	Goals	Apps	Goals	Apps	Goals
Mallorca B	2019–20	Tercera División	—		—		—		1 (Note: Appearance in Tercera División play-offs)	0	1	0
Mallorca B	2020–21	Tercera División	15 (Note: Includes three appearances in phase two)	2	—		—		—		15	2
Mallorca B	Total		15	2	—		—		1	0	16	2
Mallorca	2019–20	La Liga	1	0	—		—		—		1	0
Mallorca	2020–21	Segunda División	6	1	2	0	—		—		8	1
Mallorca	Total		7	1	2	0	—		—		9	1
Lazio	2021–22	Serie A	8	0	1	0	—		—		9	0
Lazio	2022–23	Serie A	6	1	1	0	5 (Note: Three appearances in UEFA Europa League, two appearances in UEFA Europa Conference League)	0	—		12	1
Lazio	Total		14	1	2	0	5	0	—		21	1
AC Milan	2023–24	Serie A	4	0	1	0	—		—		5	0
Almería (loan)	2023–24	La Liga	13	3	—		—		—		13	3
Alavés (loan)	2024–25	La Liga	6	0	2	0	—		—		8	0
Cruz Azul	2024–25	Liga MX	17	2	—		6 (Note: Appearances in CONCACAF Champions Cup)	1	—		23	3
Cruz Azul	2025–26	Liga MX	37	3	—		5	3	4 (Note: Three appearances in Leagues Cup, one appearance in FIFA Intercontinental Cup)	0	46	6
Cruz Azul	2026–27	Liga MX	15	1	—		—		4 (Note: One appearance in Campeón de Campeones, three appearances in Leagues Cup)	0	19	1
Cruz Azul	Total		69	6	—		11	4	8	0	88	10
Career total			128	13	7	0	16	4	9	0	160	17

== Honours ==
Cruz Azul

- Liga MX: Clausura 2026
- Campeón de Campeones: 2026
- CONCACAF Champions Cup: 2025
