= 2023–24 AC Milan season =

Milan
2023–24 season
- Chairman: Paolo Scaroni
- Head coach: Stefano Pioli
- Stadium: San Siro
- Serie A: 2nd
- Coppa Italia: Quarter-finals
- UEFA Champions League: Group stage
- UEFA Europa League: Quarter-finals
- Top goalscorer: League: Olivier Giroud (15); All: Olivier Giroud (17)
- Average home league attendance: 71,835
- Biggest win: Milan 5–1 Cagliari
- Biggest defeat: Internazionale 5–1 Milan
| Home colours | Away colours | Third colours |

The 2023–24 season was the 125th season in the existence of AC Milan and the club's 90th season in the top flight of Italian football. In addition to the domestic league, Milan participated in this season's editions of the Coppa Italia, the UEFA Champions League (entering in the group stage) and the UEFA Europa League (entering in the knockout phase). This season was the fifth and final to feature Stefano Pioli as the senior team's head coach. AC Milan drew an average home attendance of 72,000 in 19 home games in the 2023–24 league season.

== Players ==
=== Squad information ===
As of 30 June 2024.

| No. | Player | Nat. | Position(s) | Date of birth (age) | Signed in | Contract ends | Signed from | Transfer fee | Notes | Apps | Goals |
Goalkeepers
| 16 | Mike Maignan | (France) | GK | 3 July 1995 (aged 28) | 2021 | 2026 | (France) Lille | €13,000,000 | | 110 | 0 |
| 57 | Marco Sportiello | (Italy) | GK | 10 May 1992 (aged 32) | 2023 | 2027 | (Italy) Atalanta | Free | | 9 | 0 |
| 69 | Lapo Nava | (Italy) | GK | 22 January 2004 (aged 20) | 2023 | n/a | (Italy) Milan Primavera | Free | From Youth system | 1 | 0 |
| 83 | Antonio Mirante | (Italy) | GK | 8 July 1983 (aged 40) | 2021 | 2024 | (Italy) Roma | Free | | 4 | 0 |
Defenders
| 2 | Davide Calabria (captain) | (Italy) | RB | 6 December 1996 (aged 27) | 2015 | 2025 | (Italy) Milan Primavera | Free | From Youth system | 258 | 9 |
| 19 | Théo Hernandez (vice-captain) | (France) | LB | 6 October 1997 (aged 26) | 2019 | 2026 | (Spain) Real Madrid | €20,000,000 | | 213 | 29 |
| 20 | Pierre Kalulu | (France) | CB | 5 June 2000 (aged 24) | 2020 | 2027 | (France) Lyon II | €480,000 | | 112 | 3 |
| 23 | Fikayo Tomori | (England) | CB | 19 December 1997 (aged 26) | 2021 | 2027 | (England) Chelsea | €28,500,000 | | 142 | 7 |
| 24 | Simon Kjær | (Denmark) | CB | 26 March 1989 (aged 35) | 2020 | 2024 | (Spain) Sevilla | €2,500,000 | | 121 | 1 |
| 28 | Malick Thiaw | (Germany) | CB | 8 August 2001 (aged 22) | 2022 | 2027 | (Germany) Schalke 04 | €7,000,000 | | 54 | 0 |
| 30 | Mattia Caldara | (Italy) | CB | 5 May 1994 (aged 30) | 2018 | 2024 | (Italy) Juventus | €35,000,000 | | 3 | 0 |
| 38 | Filippo Terracciano | (Italy) | RB | 8 February 2003 (aged 21) | 2024 | 2029 | (Italy) Hellas Verona | €4,500,000 | | 6 | 0 |
| 42 | Alessandro Florenzi | (Italy) | RB | 11 March 1991 (aged 33) | 2021 | 2025 | (Italy) Roma | €3,700,000 | | 76 | 3 |
| 46 | Matteo Gabbia | (Italy) | CB | 21 October 1999 (aged 24) | 2017 | 2026 | (Italy) Milan Primavera | Free | From Youth system | 76 | 4 |
| 74 | Álex Jiménez | (Spain) | RB | 8 May 2005 (aged 19) | 2023 | 2024 | (Spain) Real Madrid B | Undisclosed | From Youth system | 5 | 0 |
| 82 | Jan-Carlo Simić | (Serbia) | CB | 2 May 2005 (aged 19) | 2022 | 2027 | (Germany) VfB Stuttgart | €1,000,000 | From Youth system | 6 | 1 |
Midfielders
| 4 | Ismaël Bennacer | (Algeria) | CM | 1 December 1997 (aged 26) | 2019 | 2027 | (Italy) Empoli | €16,000,000 | | 170 | 8 |
| 7 | Yacine Adli | (France) | CM | 29 July 2000 (aged 23) | 2022 | 2026 | (France) Bordeaux | €8,000,000 | | 39 | 1 |
| 8 | Ruben Loftus-Cheek | (England) | CM | 23 January 1996 (aged 28) | 2023 | 2027 | (England) Chelsea | €16,000,000 | | 40 | 10 |
| 14 | Tijjani Reijnders | (Netherlands) | CM | 29 July 1998 (aged 25) | 2023 | 2027 | (Netherlands) AZ | €20,000,000 | | 50 | 4 |
| 32 | Tommaso Pobega | (Italy) | CM | 15 July 1999 (aged 24) | 2022 | 2027 | (Italy) Milan Primavera | Free | From Youth system | 43 | 3 |
| 80 | Yunus Musah | (United States) | CM | 29 November 2002 (aged 21) | 2023 | 2028 | (Spain) Valencia | €20,000,000 | | 40 | 0 |
Forwards
| 9 | Olivier Giroud | (France) | ST | 30 September 1986 (aged 37) | 2021 | 2024 | (England) Chelsea | €1,000,000 | | 132 | 49 |
| 10 | Rafael Leão | (Portugal) | LW | 10 June 1999 (aged 25) | 2019 | 2028 | (France) Lille | €28,000,000 | | 210 | 58 |
| 11 | Christian Pulisic | (United States) | RW | 18 September 1998 (aged 25) | 2023 | 2027 | (England) Chelsea | €20,000,000 | | 50 | 15 |
| 15 | Luka Jović | (Serbia) | ST | 23 December 1997 (aged 26) | 2023 | 2024 | (Italy) Fiorentina | Free | | 30 | 9 |
| 17 | Noah Okafor | (Switzerland) | LW | 24 May 2000 (aged 24) | 2023 | 2028 | (Austria) Red Bull Salzburg | €14,000,000 | | 36 | 6 |
| 21 | Samuel Chukwueze | (Nigeria) | RW | 22 May 1999 (aged 25) | 2023 | 2028 | (Spain) Villarreal | €20,000,000 | | 33 | 3 |

== Transfers ==
=== Summer window ===
Deals officialised beforehand were effective starting from 1 July 2023.

==== In ====
| Date | Pos. | Player | Age | Moving from | Fee | Notes | Source |
|---|---|---|---|---|---|---|---|
| 1 July 2023 | MF | (England) Ruben Loftus-Cheek | 27 | (England) Chelsea | €16,000,000 | + €4,000,000 add-ons | |
| 1 July 2023 | GK | (Italy) Lapo Nava | 19 | (Italy) Milan Primavera | Free | Promoted from Primavera | |
| 1 July 2023 | GK | (Italy) Marco Sportiello | 31 | (Italy) Atalanta | Free | | |
| 1 July 2023 | FW | (Ivory Coast) Chaka Traorè | 18 | (Italy) Milan Primavera | Free | Promoted from Primavera | |
| 3 July 2023 | GK | (France) Noah Raveyre | 18 | (France) Saint-Étienne | Free | Joined Primavera squad | |
| 6 July 2023 | MF | (Argentina) Luka Romero | 18 | (Italy) Lazio | Free | | |
| 13 July 2023 | MF | (United States) Christian Pulisic | 24 | (England) Chelsea | €20,000,000 | | |
| 19 July 2023 | MF | (Netherlands) Tijjani Reijnders | 24 | (Netherlands) AZ | €20,000,000 | + €5,000,000 add-ons | |
| 22 July 2023 | FW | (Switzerland) Noah Okafor | 23 | (Austria) Red Bull Salzburg | €14,000,000 | | |
| 27 July 2023 | FW | (Nigeria) Samuel Chukwueze | 24 | (Spain) Villarreal | €20,000,000 | + €8,000,000 add-ons | |
| 4 August 2023 | MF | (United States) Yunus Musah | 20 | (Spain) Valencia | €20,000,000 | + €1,000,000 add-ons | |
| 22 August 2023 | DF | (Argentina) Marco Pellegrino | 21 | (Argentina) Platense | €3,500,000 | + €2,000,000 add-ons | |
| 1 September 2023 | FW | (Serbia) Luka Jović | 25 | (Italy) Fiorentina | Free | | |

==== Loans in ====
| Date | Pos. | Player | Age | Moving from | Fee | Notes | Source |
|---|---|---|---|---|---|---|---|
| 20 July 2023 | DF | (Spain) Álex Jiménez | 18 | (Spain) Real Madrid B | Undisclosed | Joined Primavera squad | |

==== Loan returns ====
| Date | Pos. | Player | Age | Moving from | Fee | Notes | Source |
|---|---|---|---|---|---|---|---|
| 30 June 2023 | DF | (Italy) Mattia Caldara | 29 | (Italy) Spezia | | | |

Total spending: ▼€113,500,000

==== Out ====
| Date | Pos. | Player | Age | Moving to | Fee | Notes | Source |
|---|---|---|---|---|---|---|---|
| 30 June 2023 | GK | (Romania) Ciprian Tătărușanu | 37 | (Saudi Arabia) Abha | Free | End of contract | |
| 30 June 2023 | DF | (Italy) Gabriele Bellodi | 22 | (Italy) Olbia | Free | After return from loan, end of contract | |
| 30 June 2023 | FW | (Sweden) Zlatan Ibrahimović | 41 | Retired | | | |
| 1 July 2023 | MF | (Italy) Giovanni Robotti | 21 | (Italy) Derthona | Free | End of contract | |
| 3 July 2023 | MF | (Italy) Sandro Tonali | 23 | (England) Newcastle United | €70,000,000 | + €10,000,000 add-ons | |
| 7 July 2023 | MF | (Italy) Marco Brescianini | 22 | (Italy) Frosinone | Undisclosed | After return from loan | |
| 11 July 2023 | GK | (Greece) Fotis Pseftis | 20 | (Switzerland) Lugano | Undisclosed | From Primavera squad | |
| 13 July 2023 | FW | (Italy) Youns El Hilali | 20 | (Netherlands) Cambuur | Undisclosed | From Primavera squad | |
| 22 July 2023 | MF | (Italy) Federico Marrone | 19 | (Italy) Pontedera | Undisclosed | From Primavera squad | |
| 24 July 2023 | MF | (Italy) Nicholas Pluvio | 19 | (Italy) Gozzano | Undisclosed | From Primavera squad | |
| 31 July 2023 | FW | (Croatia) Ante Rebić | 29 | (Turkey) Beşiktaş | €500,000 | + €1,500,000 add-ons | |
| 10 August 2023 | GK | (Denmark) Andreas Jungdal | 21 | (Italy) Cremonese | Free | After return from loan | |
| 13 August 2023 | MF | (Croatia) Antonio Mionić | 22 | (Czech Republic) SK Líšeň | Free | After return from loan | |
| 24 August 2023 | DF | (Republic of Ireland) Cathal Heffernan | 18 | (England) Newcastle United | Undisclosed | From Primavera squad | |
| 25 August 2023 | FW | (Italy) Andrea Capone | 21 | (Croatia) NK Varaždin | Undisclosed | From Primavera squad | |

==== Loans ended ====
| Date | Pos. | Player | Age | Moving to | Fee | Notes | Source |
|---|---|---|---|---|---|---|---|
| 30 June 2023 | DF | (United States) Sergiño Dest | 22 | (Spain) Barcelona | | | |
| 30 June 2023 | MF | (France) Tiémoué Bakayoko | 28 | (England) Chelsea | | | |
| 30 June 2023 | MF | (Spain) Brahim Díaz | 23 | (Spain) Real Madrid | | | |
| 30 June 2023 | MF | (Belgium) Aster Vranckx | 20 | (Germany) VfL Wolfsburg | | | |

==== Loans out ====
| Date | Pos. | Player | Age | Moving to | Fee | Notes | Source |
|---|---|---|---|---|---|---|---|
| 10 July 2023 | MF | (Italy) Daniel Maldini | 21 | (Italy) Empoli | Free | After return from loan | |
| 11 July 2023 | FW | (Italy) (Nigeria) Bob Murphy Omoregbe | 19 | (Italy) Fiorenzuola | Free | After return from loan | |
| 16 July 2023 | FW | (Italy) Marco Nasti | 19 | (Italy) Bari | Undisclosed | After return from loan | |
| 19 July 2023 | MF | (Italy) Antonio Gala | 19 | (Italy) Sestri Levante | Free | From Primavera squad | |
| 19 July 2023 | DF | (Italy) Leonardo D'Alessio | 19 | (Italy) Pro Sesto | Free | From Primavera squad | |
| 22 July 2023 | FW | (Italy) Gabriele Alesi | 19 | (Italy) Sampdoria | Free | From Primavera squad | |
| 24 July 2023 | DF | (Italy) Tommaso Cecotti | 17 | (Italy) Carpi | Free | From Primavera squad | |
| 26 July 2023 | DF | (Italy) Matteo Gabbia | 23 | (Spain) Villarreal | Free | | |
| 3 August 2023 | DF | (Italy) Andrea Bozzolan | 19 | (Italy) Perugia | Free | From Primavera squad | |
| 5 August 2023 | GK | (Colombia) Devis Vásquez | 25 | (England) Sheffield Wednesday | Undisclosed | | |
| 11 August 2023 | FW | (Brazil) Junior Messias | 32 | (Italy) Genoa | €1,500,000 | With obligation to buy | |
| 16 August 2023 | FW | (Belgium) Charles De Ketelaere | 22 | (Italy) Atalanta | €3,000,000 | With option to buy | |
| 24 August 2023 | FW | (Serbia) Marko Lazetić | 19 | (Netherlands) Fortuna Sittard | Free | After return from loan | |
| 30 August 2023 | MF | (Belgium) Alexis Saelemaekers | 24 | (Italy) Bologna | €500,000 | With option to buy | |
| 1 September 2023 | DF | (Senegal) Fodé Ballo-Touré | 26 | (England) Fulham | Undisclosed | | |
| 1 September 2023 | FW | (Italy) Lorenzo Colombo | 21 | (Italy) Monza | Free | After return from loan | |
| 1 September 2023 | FW | (Belgium) Divock Origi | 28 | (England) Nottingham Forest | Free | With option to buy | |

Total income: ▲€75,500,000

=== Winter window ===
==== In ====
| Date | Pos. | Player | Age | Moving from | Fee | Notes | Source |
|---|---|---|---|---|---|---|---|
| 8 January 2024 | DF | (Italy) Filippo Terracciano | 20 | (Italy) Hellas Verona | €4,500,000 | | |

==== Loan returns ====
| Date | Pos. | Player | Age | Moving from | Fee | Notes | Source |
|---|---|---|---|---|---|---|---|
| 30 November 2023 | FW | (Sweden) Emil Roback | 20 | (Sweden) IFK Norrköping | | | |
| 3 January 2024 | DF | (Italy) Matteo Gabbia | 24 | (Spain) Villarreal | Free | Anticipated return from loan | |

Total spending: ▼€4,500,000

==== Out ====
| Date | Pos. | Player | Age | Moving to | Fee | Notes | Source |
|---|---|---|---|---|---|---|---|
| 15 January 2024 | FW | (Brazil) Junior Messias | 32 | (Italy) Genoa | €2,500,000 | From loan to definitive purchase | |

Notes

1. ^{†} Loan transfer made permanent

==== Loans out ====
| Date | Pos. | Player | Age | Moving to | Fee | Notes | Source |
|---|---|---|---|---|---|---|---|
| 9 January 2024 | FW | (Italy) (Nigeria) Bob Murphy Omoregbe | 20 | (Italy) Sestri Levante | Free | After anticipated return from loan | |
| 10 January 2024 | MF | (Italy) Daniel Maldini | 22 | (Italy) Monza | Free | After anticipated return from loan | |
| 13 January 2024 | MF | (Bosnia and Herzegovina) Rade Krunić | 30 | (Turkey) Fenerbahçe | Free | With option to buy | |
| 19 January 2024 | GK | (Colombia) Devis Vásquez | 25 | (Italy) Ascoli | Free | After anticipated return from loan | |
| 22 January 2024 | FW | (Argentina) Luka Romero | 19 | (Spain) Almería | Free | | |
| 22 January 2024 | FW | (Italy) (Colombia) Maikol Cifuentes | 18 | (Italy) Lecco | Free | From Primavera squad | |
| 1 February 2024 | DF | (Argentina) Marco Pellegrino | 21 | (Italy) Salernitana | Free | | |
| 1 February 2024 | FW | (Ivory Coast) Chaka Traorè | 19 | (Italy) Palermo | Free | With option to buy | |

Total income: ▲€2,500,000

== Pre-season and friendlies ==
Win Draw Loss Fixtures

| 20 July 2023 Friendly | Milan | 7–0 | Lumezzane | Carnago, Italy |
| 17:00 CEST (UTC+2) | Pobega 5', 17'; Messias 18'; Colombo 20', 42'; Romero 60+5' (pen.); Zeroli 60+7' | Report | | Stadium: Milanello; Referee: Andrea Colombo |
Note: Match was played in two halves of thirty minutes each.

| 23 July 2023 Soccer Champions Tour 2023 | Real Madrid | 3–2 | Milan | Los Angeles, United States |
| 19:10 PDT (UTC−7) | Valverde 57', 59'; Vinícius 84' | Report | Tomori 25'; Romero 42', (yellow card) 47' | Stadium: Rose Bowl; Attendance: 70,814; Referee: Timothy Ford (United States) |

| 27 July 2023 Soccer Champions Tour 2023 | Juventus | 2–2 (4–3 p) | Milan | Los Angeles, United States |
| 19:30 PDT (UTC−7) | Danilo 33'; Rugani 48'; Locatelli (yellow card) 54' | Report | Thiaw (yellow card) 15', (goal) 23'; Giroud 39' | Stadium: Dignity Health Sports Park; Attendance: 8,000; Referee: Timothy Ford (United States) |
| | Penalties |
| | Milik (penalty scored); Iling-Junior (penalty missed); Nicolussi (penalty scored); Huijsen (penalty scored); Kostić (penalty missed); Soulé (penalty scored) | | (penalty missed) Romero; (penalty scored) Adli; (penalty missed) Pobega; (penalty scored) Colombo; (penalty scored) De Ketelaere; (penalty missed) Bartesaghi |

| 1 August 2023 Soccer Champions Tour 2023 | Milan | 0–1 | Barcelona | Las Vegas, United States |
| 20:00 PDT (UTC−7) | Loftus-Cheek (yellow card) 29'; Reijnders (yellow card) 44' | Report | Alonso (yellow card) 7'; Fati 55' | Stadium: Allegiant Stadium; Attendance: 38,986; Referee: Alex Chilowicz (United States) |

| 8 August 2023 Trofeo Silvio Berlusconi | Monza | 1–1 (5–6 p) | Milan | Monza, Italy |
| 21:00 CEST (UTC+2) | Colpani 32'; Gagliardini (yellow card) 58' | Report | Pulisic (penalty missed) 29', 29'; Reijnders (yellow card) 45'; Leão (yellow card) 58'; Hernandez (yellow card) 61' | Stadium: Stadio Brianteo; Attendance: 16,917; Referee: Matteo Marcenaro |
| | Penalties |
| | Petagna (penalty scored); Caprari (penalty scored); Machín (penalty scored); Carboni (penalty scored); Pessina (penalty scored); Birindelli (penalty missed) | | (penalty scored) Reijnders; (penalty scored) Okafor; (penalty scored) Tomori; (penalty scored) Loftus-Cheek; (penalty scored) Colombo; (penalty scored) Thiaw |

| 9 August 2023 Friendly | Milan | 0–1 | Trento | Carnago, Italy |
| 18:00 CEST (UTC+2) | | Report | Šipoš 69' | Stadium: Milanello; Attendance: 0 Referee: Andrea Calzavara |

| 12 August 2023 Friendly | Milan | 4–0 | Étoile du Sahel | Carnago, Italy |
| 18:00 CEST (UTC+2) | Loftus-Cheek 13', 35', 38'; Giroud 53' (pen.) | Report | | Stadium: Milanello; Referee: Andrea Bordin (Italy) |

| 13 August 2023 Friendly | Milan | 4–2 | Novara | Carnago, Italy |
| 11:00 CEST (UTC+2) | Chukwueze 9'; Okafor 15'; Calabria 55'; Colombo 88' | Report | Corti 31'; Prinelli 82' | Stadium: Milanello; Attendance: 0 Referee: Matteo Gualtieri |

| 31 May 2024 Friendly | Milan | 2–5 | Roma | Perth, Australia |
| 19:10 AWST (UTC+8) | Hernandez 37'; Okafor 55' | Report | Baldanzi 27'; Abraham 45+2'; Angeliño 54'; Dybala 57'; Azmoun 77' | Stadium: Perth Stadium; Attendance: 56,522; Referee: Alireza Faghani (Australia) |

== Competitions ==
=== Overall record ===
| Competition | First match | Last match | Starting round | Final position | Record | | | | | | | |
| Competition | First match | Last match | Starting round | Final position | Pld | W | D | L | GF | GA | GD | Win % |
|---|---|---|---|---|---|---|---|---|---|---|---|---|
| Serie A | 21 August 2023 | 25 May 2024 | Matchday 1 | 2nd | 38 | 22 | 9 | 7 | 76 | 49 | +27 | 57.89 |
| Coppa Italia | 2 January 2024 | 10 January 2024 | Round of 16 | Quarter-finals | 2 | 1 | 0 | 1 | 5 | 3 | +2 | 50.00 |
| UEFA Champions League | 19 September 2023 | 13 December 2023 | Group stage | Group stage | 6 | 2 | 2 | 2 | 5 | 8 | −3 | 33.33 |
| UEFA Europa League | 15 February 2024 | 18 April 2024 | Knockout round play-offs | Quarter-finals | 6 | 3 | 0 | 3 | 13 | 9 | +4 | 50.00 |
| Total | | | | | 52 | 28 | 11 | 13 | 99 | 69 | +30 | 53.85 |

Source: Soccerway

=== Serie A ===
==== League table ====
| Pos | Team | Pld | W | D | L | GF | GA | GD | Pts | Qualification or relegation |
|---|---|---|---|---|---|---|---|---|---|---|
| 1 | Inter Milan (C) | 38 | 29 | 7 | 2 | 89 | 22 | +67 | 94 | Qualification for the Champions League league phase (Note: Serie A gained an additional Champions League place as a result of Italy finishing as one of the two associations with the highest coefficient points in 2023–24.) |
| 2 | Milan | 38 | 22 | 9 | 7 | 76 | 49 | +27 | 75 | Qualification for the Champions League league phase |
| 3 | Juventus | 38 | 19 | 14 | 5 | 54 | 31 | +23 | 71 | Qualification for the Champions League league phase |
| 4 | Atalanta | 38 | 21 | 6 | 11 | 72 | 42 | +30 | 69 | Qualification for the Champions League league phase |
| 5 | Bologna | 38 | 18 | 14 | 6 | 54 | 32 | +22 | 68 | Qualification for the Champions League league phase |

Source: Serie A
Rules for classification: 1) Points; 2) Tiebreaker for Champions team and third relegated team; 3) Head-to-head points; 4) Head-to-head goal difference; 5) Goal difference; 6) Goals scored; 7) Draw.
(Note: Head-to-head record is used only after all the matches between the teams in question have been played)
(C) Champions

==== Results summary ====
| Overall | | | | | | | | Home | | | | | | Away | | | | | |
| Pld | W | D | L | GF | GA | GD | Pts | W | D | L | GF | GA | GD | W | D | L | GF | GA | GD |
|---|---|---|---|---|---|---|---|---|---|---|---|---|---|---|---|---|---|---|---|
| 38 | 22 | 9 | 7 | 76 | 49 | +27 | 75 | 12 | 4 | 3 | 38 | 17 | +21 | 10 | 5 | 4 | 38 | 32 | +6 |

Source: Serie A

==== Results by round ====
| Round | 1 | 2 | 3 | 4 | 5 | 6 | 7 | 8 | 9 | 10 | 11 | 12 | 13 | 14 | 15 | 16 | 17 | 18 | 19 | 20 | 21 | 22 | 23 | 24 | 25 | 26 | 27 | 28 | 29 | 30 | 31 | 32 | 33 | 34 | 35 | 36 | 37 | 38 |
|---|---|---|---|---|---|---|---|---|---|---|---|---|---|---|---|---|---|---|---|---|---|---|---|---|---|---|---|---|---|---|---|---|---|---|---|---|---|---|
| Ground | A | H | A | A | H | A | H | A | H | A | H | A | H | H | A | H | A | H | A | H | A | H | A | H | A | H | A | H | A | A | H | A | H | A | H | H | A | H |
| Result | W | W | W | L | W | W | W | W | L | D | L | D | W | W | L | W | D | W | W | W | W | D | W | W | L | D | W | W | W | W | W | D | L | D | D | W | L | D |
| Position | 6 | 1 | 2 | 3 | 2 | 2 | 2 | 1 | 2 | 3 | 3 | 3 | 3 | 3 | 3 | 3 | 3 | 3 | 3 | 3 | 3 | 3 | 3 | 3 | 3 | 3 | 3 | 2 | 2 | 2 | 2 | 2 | 2 | 2 | 2 | 2 | 2 | 2 |

Source: Serie A
A = Away; H = Home; W = Win; D = Draw; L = Loss

==== Matches ====
The league fixtures were announced on 5 July 2023.

| 21 August 2023 1 | Bologna | 0–2 | Milan | Bologna |
| 20:45 CEST (UTC+2) | Aebischer (yellow card) 30'; Zirkzee (yellow card) 77' | Report | Giroud 11'; Pulisic 21'; Hernandez (yellow card) 51'; Krunić (yellow card) 76' | Stadium: Stadio Renato Dall'Ara; Attendance: 30,203; Referee: Luca Pairetto |

| 26 August 2023 2 | Milan | 4–1 | Torino | Milan |
| 20:45 CEST (UTC+2) | Pulisic 33'; Hernandez (yellow card) 39', (goal) 45+2'; Giroud 43' (pen.), 65' (pen.); Thiaw (yellow card) 70' | Report | Ilić (yellow card) 11'; Schuurs 36'; Milinković-Savić (yellow card) 57'; Linetty (yellow card) 89' | Stadium: San Siro; Attendance: 72,013; Referee: Maurizio Mariani |

| 1 September 2023 3 | Roma | 1–2 | Milan | Rome |
| 20:45 CEST (UTC+2) | Paredes (yellow card) 70'; Lukaku (yellow card) 85'; Spinazzola 90+2' | Report | Giroud 9' (pen.); Tomori (yellow card) 19' (yellow-red card) 61'; Loftus-Cheek (yellow card) 34'; Leão 48'; Okafor (yellow card) 90+7' | Stadium: Stadio Olimpico; Attendance: 61,690; Referee: Antonio Rapuano |

| 16 September 2023 4 | Internazionale | 5–1 | Milan | Milan |
| 18:00 CEST (UTC+2) | Mkhitaryan 5', 69'; Thuram 38'; Çalhanoğlu (yellow card) 72', (goal) 79' (pen.); Frattesi 90+3', (yellow card) 90+4' | Report | Thiaw (yellow card) 24'; Leão 57'; Hernandez (yellow card) 61' | Stadium: San Siro; Attendance: 75,571; Referee: Simone Sozza |

| 23 September 2023 5 | Milan | 1–0 | Hellas Verona | Milan |
| 15:00 CEST (UTC+2) | Leão 8'; Thiaw (yellow card) 24'; Musah (yellow card) 58'; Pulisic (yellow card) 76'; Florenzi (yellow card) 89' | Report | Faraoni (yellow card) 42'; Bonazzoli (yellow card) 55' | Stadium: San Siro; Attendance: 71,070; Referee: Matteo Marchetti |

| 27 September 2023 6 | Cagliari | 1–3 | Milan | Cagliari |
| 18:30 CEST (UTC+2) | Luvumbo 29'; Wieteska (yellow card) 42'; Zappa (yellow card) 53'; Oristanio (yellow card) 78' | Report | Okafor 40'; Tomori 45'; Loftus-Cheek (yellow card) 48', (goal) 60' | Stadium: Unipol Domus; Attendance: 16,348; Referee: Federico La Penna |

| 30 September 2023 7 | Milan | 2–0 | Lazio | Milan |
| 18:00 CEST (UTC+2) | Pulisic 60'; Leão (yellow card) 65'; Hernandez (yellow card) 84'; Maignan (yellow card) 86'; Okafor 88' | Report | Marušić (yellow card) 51'; Romagnoli (yellow card) 64' | Stadium: San Siro; Attendance: 72,035; Referee: Davide Massa |

| 7 October 2023 8 | Genoa | 0–1 | Milan | Genoa |
| 20:45 CEST (UTC+2) | De Winter (yellow card) 69'; Martínez (yellow card) 86' (yellow-red card) 90+13' | Report | Hernandez (yellow card) 21'; Florenzi (yellow card) 22'; Musah (yellow card) 47'; Adli (yellow card) 62'; Pulisic 87'; Maignan (red card) 90+9'; Tomori (yellow card) 90+11' | Stadium: Stadio Luigi Ferraris; Attendance: 33,205; Referee: Marco Piccinini |

| 22 October 2023 9 | Milan | 0–1 | Juventus | Milan |
| 20:45 CEST (UTC+2) | Thiaw (red card) 40'; Reijnders (yellow card) 61' | Report | Weah (yellow card) 52'; Locatelli 63', (yellow card) 72'; McKennie (yellow card) 67'; Gatti (yellow card) 71' | Stadium: San Siro; Attendance: 75,676; Referee: Maurizio Mariani |

| 29 October 2023 10 | Napoli | 2–2 | Milan | Naples |
| 20:45 CET (UTC+1) | Politano 50'; Natan (yellow card) 53' (yellow-red card) 89'; Raspadori 63'; Di Lorenzo (yellow card) 65'; Zanoli (yellow card) 86' | Report | Giroud 22', 31'; Reijnders (yellow card) 55'; Romero (yellow card) 62'; Musah (yellow card) 78' | Stadium: Stadio Diego Armando Maradona; Attendance: 52,250; Referee: Daniele Orsato |

| 4 November 2023 11 | Milan | 0–1 | Udinese | Milan |
| 20:45 CET (UTC+1) | Krunić (yellow card) 19' | Report | Pérez (yellow card) 54'; Kabasele (yellow card) 55'; Pereyra 62' (pen.) | Stadium: San Siro; Attendance: 71,018; Referee: Juan Luca Sacchi |

| 11 November 2023 12 | Lecce | 2–2 | Milan | Lecce |
| 15:00 CET (UTC+1) | Ramadani (yellow card) 45'; Strefezza (yellow card) 62'; Sansone 66'; Banda 70'; Piccoli (yellow card) 85'; González (yellow card) 90+2' | Report | Giroud 28', (yellow card) (red card) 90+3'; Reijnders 35'; Hernandez (yellow card) 44'; Musah (yellow card) 80'; Calabria (yellow card) 81'; Florenzi (yellow card) 90'; Krunić (yellow card) 90+4' | Stadium: Stadio Via del mare Attendance: 26,484; Referee: Rosario Abisso |

| 25 November 2023 13 | Milan | 1–0 | Fiorentina | Milan |
| 20:45 CET (UTC+1) | Hernandez 45+2' (pen.); Tomori (yellow card) 56' | Report | Arthur (yellow card) 12'; Parisi (yellow card) 45+1' | Stadium: San Siro; Attendance: 73,074; Referee: Marco Di Bello |

| 2 December 2023 14 | Milan | 3–1 | Frosinone | Milan |
| 20:45 CET (UTC+1) | Jović 43', (yellow card) 80'; Pulisic 50'; Tomori 74' | Report | Barrenechea (yellow card) 63'; Brescianini 82' | Stadium: San Siro; Attendance: 68,848; Referee: Matteo Marchetti |

| 9 December 2023 15 | Atalanta | 3–2 | Milan | Bergamo |
| 18:00 CET (UTC+1) | Lookman 38', 55'; Éderson (yellow card) 72'; Muriel 90+5' | Report | Giroud 45+3'; Reijnders (yellow card) 71'; Jović 80', (yellow card) 88'; Calabria (yellow card) 81' (yellow-red card) 90+3'; Bennacer (yellow card) 90+3' | Stadium: Gewiss Stadium; Attendance: 14,907; Referee: Federico La Penna |

| 17 December 2023 16 | Milan | 3–0 | Monza | Milan |
| 12:30 CET (UTC+1) | Reijnders 3', (yellow card) 34'; Simić 41'; Okafor 76' | Report | Carboni (yellow card) 55'; Gagliardini (yellow card) 90+3' | Stadium: San Siro; Attendance: 70,538; Referee: Gianluca Aureliano |

| 22 December 2023 17 | Salernitana | 2–2 | Milan | Salerno |
| 20:45 CET (UTC+1) | Fazio 42'; Kastanos (yellow card) 44'; Candreva 63'; Mazzocchi (yellow card) 71'; Gyömbér (yellow card) 74'; Fiorillo (red card) 90+4' | Report | Tomori 17'; Leão (yellow card) 35'; Jović 90' | Stadium: Stadio Arechi; Attendance: 23,467; Referee: Daniele Doveri |

| 30 December 2023 18 | Milan | 1–0 | Sassuolo | Milan |
| 18:00 CET (UTC+1) | Pulisic 59' | Report | Castillejo (yellow card) 88' | Stadium: San Siro; Attendance: 70,385; Referee: Livio Marinelli |

| 7 January 2024 19 | Empoli | 0–3 | Milan | Empoli |
| 12:30 CET (UTC+1) | Marin (yellow card) 81' | Report | Loftus-Cheek 11'; Giroud 31' (pen.); Calabria (yellow card) 41'; Jiménez (yellow card) 54'; Traorè 88' | Stadium: Stadio Carlo Castellani; Attendance: 15,009; Referee: Federico La Penna |

| 14 January 2024 20 | Milan | 3–1 | Roma | Milan |
| 20:45 CET (UTC+1) | Adli 11'; Giroud 56'; Kjær (yellow card) 71'; Hernandez 84'; Gabbia (yellow card) 90+1' | Report | Mancini (yellow card) 43'; Cristante (yellow card) 56'; Paredes 69' (pen.); Huijsen (yellow card) 81' | Stadium: San Siro; Attendance: 74,198; Referee: Marco Guida |

| 20 January 2024 21 | Udinese | 2–3 | Milan | Udine |
| 20:45 CET (UTC+1) | Samardžić 42'; Kamara (yellow card) 45+1'; Ebosele (yellow card) 52'; Thauvin (yellow card) 56', (goal) 62'; Walace (yellow card) 65'; Lucca (yellow card) 71'; Ferreira (yellow card) 78' | Report | Loftus-Cheek 31'; Jović 83'; Hernandez (yellow card) 88'; Okafor 90+3' | Stadium: Stadio Friuli; Attendance: 15,077; Referee: Fabio Maresca |
Note: The match was delayed for ten minutes in the first half after Milan players left the pitch, due to racist crowd remarks towards Milan goalkeeper Mike Maignan.

| 27 January 2024 22 | Milan | 2–2 | Bologna | Milan |
| 20:45 CET (UTC+1) | Leão (yellow card) 22'; Calabria (yellow card) 36'; Giroud (penalty missed) 42'; Adli (yellow card) 44'; Loftus-Cheek 45', 83', (yellow card) 45+2'; Hernandez (penalty missed) 74'; Terracciano (yellow card) 90+1' | Report | Calafiori (yellow card) 2'; Zirkzee 29'; Ferguson (yellow card) 29'; Urbański (yellow card) 57'; Orsolini 90+2' (pen.) | Stadium: San Siro; Attendance: 71,334; Referee: Davide Massa |

| 3 February 2024 23 | Frosinone | 2–3 | Milan | Frosinone |
| 18:00 CET (UTC+1) | Soulé 24' (pen.); Harroui (yellow card) 56'; Mazzitelli 65' | Report | Giroud 17'; Loftus-Cheek (yellow card) 43'; Reijnders (yellow card) 49'; Gabbia 72'; Jović 81'; Florenzi (yellow card) 90+5' | Stadium: Stadio Benito Stirpe; Attendance: 16,050; Referee: Luca Pairetto |

| 11 February 2024 24 | Milan | 1–0 | Napoli | Milan |
| 20:45 CET (UTC+1) | Hernandez 25', (yellow card) 90+6' | Report | Juan Jesus (yellow card) 85' | Stadium: San Siro; Attendance: 73,891; Referee: Daniele Doveri |

| 18 February 2024 25 | Monza | 4–2 | Milan | Monza |
| 20:45 CET (UTC+1) | Đurić (yellow card) 33'; Pessina 45' (pen.), (yellow card) 45+8'; Mota 45+6', (yellow card) 76'; Bondo (yellow card) 76', (goal) 90'; Colombo 90+5' | Report | Jović (red card) 53'; Giroud 64'; Gabbia (yellow card) 83'; Pulisic 88' | Stadium: Stadio Brianteo; Attendance: 14,319; Referee: Andrea Colombo |

| 25 February 2024 26 | Milan | 1–1 | Atalanta | Milan |
| 20:45 CET (UTC+1) | Leão 3', (yellow card) 45+3' | Report | Koopmeiners 42' (pen.); De Roon (yellow card) 44'; Holm (yellow card) 45+3'; Lookman (yellow card) 56'; Éderson (yellow card) 90+4' | Stadium: San Siro; Attendance: 71,264; Referee: Daniele Orsato |

| 1 March 2024 27 | Lazio | 0–1 | Milan | Rome |
| 20:45 CET (UTC+1) | Pellegrini (yellow card) 50' (yellow-red card) 57'; Romagnoli (yellow card) 58'; Immobile (yellow card) 77'; Hysaj (yellow card) 90'; Marušić (red card) 90+5'; Guendouzi (red card) 90+6' | Report | Florenzi (yellow card) 61'; Adli (yellow card) 70'; Gabbia (yellow card) 80'; Hernandez (yellow card) 84'; Okafor 88'; Leão (yellow card) 90+5'; Pulisic (yellow card) 90+6' | Stadium: Stadio Olimpico; Attendance: 50,500; Referee: Marco Di Bello |

| 10 March 2024 28 | Milan | 1–0 | Empoli | Milan |
| 15:00 CET (UTC+1) | Reijnders (yellow card) 26'; Pulisic 40' | Report | Fazzini (yellow card) 24'; Pezzella (yellow card) 53'; Żurkowski (yellow card) 65'; Cancellieri (yellow card) 80' | Stadium: San Siro; Attendance: 70,343; Referee: Juan Luca Sacchi |

| 17 March 2024 29 | Hellas Verona | 1–3 | Milan | Verona |
| 15:00 CET (UTC+1) | Serdar (yellow card) 7'; Noslin 64' | Report | Tomori (yellow card) 30'; Hernandez 44', (yellow card) 45'; Pulisic 50'; Chukwueze 79'; Reijnders (yellow card) 87' | Stadium: Stadio Marcantonio Bentegodi; Attendance: 26,165; Referee: Maurizio Mariani |

| 30 March 2024 30 | Fiorentina | 1–2 | Milan | Florence |
| 20:45 CET (UTC+1) | Biraghi (yellow card) 13'; Martínez Quarta (yellow card) 24'; Duncan 50' | Report | Thiaw (yellow card) 21'; Loftus-Cheek 47', (yellow card) 90+3'; Leão 53'; Tomori (yellow card) 90' | Stadium: Stadio Artemio Franchi; Attendance: 32,567; Referee: Fabio Maresca |

| 6 April 2024 31 | Milan | 3–0 | Lecce | Milan |
| 15:00 CEST (UTC+2) | Pulisic 6'; Giroud 20'; Leão 57'; Chukwueze (yellow card) 78' | Report | Blin (yellow card) 34'; Krstović (red card) 45' | Stadium: San Siro; Attendance: 72,035; Referee: Luca Massimi |

| 14 April 2024 32 | Sassuolo | 3–3 | Milan | Reggio Emilia |
| 15:00 CEST (UTC+2) | Pinamonti 4', (yellow card) 69'; Laurienté 10', 53'; Ferrari (yellow card) 19'; Ruan (yellow card) 57' | Report | Leão 20'; Jović 59'; Thiaw (yellow card) 69'; Okafor 84' | Stadium: Mapei Stadium; Attendance: 19,199; Referee: Davide Massa |

| 22 April 2024 33 | Milan | 1–2 | Internazionale | Milan |
| 20:45 CEST (UTC+2) | Hernandez (yellow card) 37', (red card) 90+4'; Tomori 80', (yellow card) 90+2'; Gabbia (yellow card) 90'; Calabria (red card) 90+7' | Report | Acerbi 18'; Barella (yellow card) 22'; Martínez (yellow card) 32'; Thuram 49'; Dumfries (red card) 90+4' | Stadium: San Siro; Attendance: 75,554; Referee: Andrea Colombo |

| 27 April 2024 34 | Juventus | 0–0 | Milan | Turin |
| 18:00 CEST (UTC+2) | | Report | Musah (yellow card) 45+1' | Stadium: Juventus Stadium; Attendance: 39,845; Referee: Maurizio Mariani |

| 5 May 2024 35 | Milan | 3–3 | Genoa | Milan |
| 18:00 CEST (UTC+2) | Reijnders (yellow card) 43'; Florenzi 45'; Gabbia 72'; Giroud 75' | Report | Retegui 5' (pen.); Ekuban 48'; Thiaw 87' (o.g.); Vásquez (yellow card) 90+4' | Stadium: San Siro; Attendance: 73,901; Referee: Alessandro Prontera |

| 11 May 2024 36 | Milan | 5–1 | Cagliari | Milan |
| 20:45 CEST (UTC+2) | Bennacer (yellow card) 28', (goal) 35'; Gabbia (yellow card) 33'; Pulisic 59', 86'; Reijnders 74'; Leão 83' | Report | Nández 63'; Mina (yellow card) 69' | Stadium: San Siro; Attendance: 70,612; Referee: Simone Sozza |

| 18 May 2024 37 | Torino | 3–1 | Milan | Turin |
| 20:45 CEST (UTC+2) | Zapata 26'; Ilić 40'; Rodriguez 46'; Ricci (yellow card) 90+5' | Report | Bennacer 55' (pen.); Tomori (yellow card) 78' | Stadium: Stadio Olimpico Grande Torino; Attendance: 24,638; Referee: Ermanno Feliciani |

| 25 May 2024 38 | Milan | 3–3 | Salernitana | Milan |
| 20:45 CEST (UTC+2) | Leão 22'; Giroud 27'; Calabria 77' | Report | Pierozzi (yellow card) 51'; Simy 64', 89'; Sambia 87' | Stadium: San Siro; Attendance: 70,831; Referee: Davide Di Marco |

=== Coppa Italia ===
| 2 January 2024 Round of 16 | Milan | 4–1 | Cagliari | Milan |
| 21:00 CET (UTC+1) | Jović 29', 42'; Traorè 50'; Leão 90+1' | Report | Di Pardo (yellow card) 59'; Deiola (yellow card) 70'; Azzi 87', (yellow card) 88' | Stadium: San Siro; Attendance: 57,169; Referee: Alessandro Prontera |

| 10 January 2024 Quarter-finals | Milan | 1–2 | Atalanta | Milan |
| 21:00 CET (UTC+1) | Leão 45', (yellow card) 80'; Hernandez (yellow card) 58'; Mirante (red card) 90+5' | Report | Koopmeiners 45+2', 59' (pen.); Éderson (yellow card) 90' | Stadium: San Siro; Attendance: 64,036; Referee: Marco Di Bello |
Note: Mirante was sent off for dissent as an unused substitute.

=== UEFA Champions League ===
==== Group stage ====
The draw for the group stage was held on 31 August 2023.

| Pos | Team | Pld | W | D | L | GF | GA | GD | Pts | Qualification | DOR | PAR | MIL | NEW |
|---|---|---|---|---|---|---|---|---|---|---|---|---|---|---|
| 1 | (Germany) Borussia Dortmund | 6 | 3 | 2 | 1 | 7 | 4 | +3 | 11 | Advance to knockout phase | — | 1–1 | 0–0 | 2–0 |
| 2 | (France) Paris Saint-Germain | 6 | 2 | 2 | 2 | 9 | 8 | +1 | 8 (Note: Tied on head-to-head points. Head-to-head goal difference: Paris Saint-Germain +2, Milan −2.) | Advance to knockout phase | 2–0 | — | 3–0 | 1–1 |
| 3 | (Italy) Milan | 6 | 2 | 2 | 2 | 5 | 8 | −3 | 8 | Transfer to Europa League | 1–3 | 2–1 | — | 0–0 |
| 4 | (England) Newcastle United | 6 | 1 | 2 | 3 | 6 | 7 | −1 | 5 | | 0–1 | 4–1 | 1–2 | — |

Source: UEFA
Rules for classification: Group stage tiebreakers
Notes:

| 19 September 2023 1 | Milan (Italy) | 0–0 | (England) Newcastle United | Milan, Italy |
| 18:45 CEST (UTC+2) | Calabria (yellow card) 40'; Musah (yellow card) 82'; Giroud (yellow card) 83'; Krunić (yellow card) 89' | Report | Schär (yellow card) 49' | Stadium: San Siro; Attendance: 65,695; Referee: José María Sánchez Martínez (Spain) |

| 4 October 2023 2 | Borussia Dortmund (Germany) | 0–0 | (Italy) Milan | Dortmund, Germany |
| 21:00 CEST (UTC+2) | Schlotterbeck (yellow card) 19'; Can (yellow card) 25'; Hummels (yellow card) 81' | Report | Reijnders (yellow card) 23'; Musah (yellow card) 88' | Stadium: Westfalenstadion; Attendance: 81,365; Referee: Szymon Marciniak (Poland) |

| 25 October 2023 3 | Paris Saint-Germain (France) | 3–0 | (Italy) Milan | Paris, France |
| 21:00 CEST (UTC+2) | Hakimi (yellow card) 16'; Mbappé 32'; Dembélé (yellow card) 44'; Kolo Muani 53'; Lee 89' | Report | Thiaw (yellow card) 4'; Krunić (yellow card) 7'; Tomori (yellow card) 61'; Kalulu (yellow card) 62' | Stadium: Parc des Princes; Attendance: 45,962; Referee: Slavko Vinčić (Slovenia) |

| 7 November 2023 4 | Milan (Italy) | 2–1 | (France) Paris Saint-Germain | Milan, Italy |
| 21:00 CEST (UTC+2) | Leão 12'; Giroud 50'; Musah (yellow card) 66' | Report | Škriniar 9', (yellow card) 80'; Vitinha (yellow card) 24'; Kolo Muani (yellow card) 29'; Ugarte (yellow card) 44'; Hernandez (yellow card) 55' | Stadium: San Siro; Attendance: 75,649; Referee: Jesús Gil Manzano (Spain) |

| 28 November 2023 5 | Milan (Italy) | 1–3 | (Germany) Borussia Dortmund | Milan, Italy |
| 21:00 CET (UTC+1) | Giroud (penalty missed) 6'; Chukwueze 37'; Tomori (yellow card) 67' | Report | Reus 10' (pen.); Bynoe-Gittens 59'; Adeyemi 69'; Can (yellow card) 90+6' | Stadium: San Siro; Attendance: 75,292; Referee: István Kovács (Romania) |

| 13 December 2023 6 | Newcastle United (England) | 1–2 | (Italy) Milan | Newcastle upon Tyne, England |
| 20:00 GMT (UTC±0) | Joelinton 33', (yellow card) 72'; Schär (yellow card) 90+5' | Report | Leão (yellow card) 40'; Maignan (yellow card) 45+1'; Pulisic 59'; Jović (yellow card) 75'; Musah (yellow card) 80'; Chukwueze 84'; Florenzi (yellow card) 90' | Stadium: St James' Park; Attendance: 52,037; Referee: Danny Makkelie (Netherlands) |

=== UEFA Europa League ===
==== Knockout phase ====
===== Knockout round play-offs =====
The draw for the knockout round play-offs was held on 18 December 2023.

| 15 February 2024 First leg | Milan (Italy) | 3–0 | (France) Rennes | Milan, Italy |
| 21:00 CET (UTC+1) | Loftus-Cheek 32', 47'; Leão 53' | Report | Nagida (yellow card) 87' | Stadium: San Siro; Attendance: 69,021; Referee: Nikola Dabanović (Montenegro) |

| 22 February 2024 Second leg | Rennes (France) | 3–2 (3–5 agg.) | (Italy) Milan | Rennes, France |
| 18:45 CET (UTC+1) | Bourigeaud 11', 54' (pen.), 68' (pen.); Gouiri (yellow card) 69' | Report | Jović 22'; Kjær (yellow card) 53'; Leão 58'; Maignan (yellow card) 79' | Stadium: Roazhon Park; Attendance: 28,320; Referee: João Pinheiro (Portugal) |

===== Round of 16 =====
The draw for the round of 16 was held on 23 February 2024.

| 7 March 2024 First leg | Milan (Italy) | 4–2 | (Czech Republic) Slavia Prague | Milan, Italy |
| 21:00 CET (UTC+1) | Florenzi (yellow card) 2'; Giroud 34'; Reijnders 44'; Loftus-Cheek 45+1'; Calabria (yellow card) 72'; Pulisic 85' | Report | Diouf (red card) 26'; Douděra 36'; Schranz 65' | Stadium: San Siro; Attendance: 59,325; Referee: Halil Umut Meler (Turkey) |

| 14 March 2024 Second leg | Slavia Prague (Czech Republic) | 1–3 (3–7 agg.) | (Italy) Milan | Prague, Czech Republic |
| 18:45 CET (UTC+1) | Holeš (red card) 20'; Douděra (yellow card) 22'; Jurásek 84'; Tomič (yellow card) 86'; Dorley (yellow card) 89' | Report | Pulisic 33'; Loftus-Cheek 36'; Tomori (yellow card) 44'; Leão 45+6', (yellow card) 89'; Gabbia (yellow card) 56' | Stadium: Fortuna Arena; Attendance: 19,334; Referee: Glenn Nyberg (Sweden) |

===== Quarter-finals =====
The draw for the quarter-finals was held on 15 March 2024.

| 11 April 2024 First leg | Milan (Italy) | 0–1 | (Italy) Roma | Milan, Italy |
| 21:00 CEST (UTC+2) | Pulisic (yellow card) 33'; Adli (yellow card) 63'; Loftus-Cheek (yellow card) 73' | Report | Mancini 17'; Cristante (yellow card) 38' | Stadium: San Siro; Attendance: 75,023; Referee: Clément Turpin (France) |

| 18 April 2024 Second leg | Roma (Italy) | 2–1 (3–1 agg.) | (Italy) Milan | Rome, Italy |
| 21:00 CEST (UTC+2) | Mancini 12'; Dybala 22'; Çelik (red card) 31' | Report | Gabbia (yellow card) 46', (goal) 85'; Adli (yellow card) 51'; Jović (yellow card) 77'; Calabria (yellow card) 86'; Tomori (yellow card) 89'; Hernandez (yellow card) 90+3' | Stadium: Stadio Olimpico; Attendance: 66,025; Referee: Szymon Marciniak (Poland) |

== Statistics ==
=== Appearances and goals ===
| No. | Pos | Nat | Player | Total | | Serie A | | Coppa Italia | | Champions League | | Europa League | |
| No. | Pos | Nat | Player | Apps | Goals | Apps | Goals | Apps | Goals | Apps | Goals | Apps | Goals |
Goalkeepers
| 16 | GK | (France) FRA | Mike Maignan | 42 | 0 | 29 | 0 | 1 | 0 | 6 | 0 | 6 | 0 |
| 57 | GK | (Italy) ITA | Marco Sportiello | 9 | 0 | 7 | 0 | 0 | 0 | 0+1 | 0 | 0+1 | 0 |
| 69 | GK | (Italy) ITA | Lapo Nava | 1 | 0 | 0+1 | 0 | 0 | 0 | 0 | 0 | 0 | 0 |
| 83 | GK | (Italy) ITA | Antonio Mirante | 3 | 0 | 2 | 0 | 1 | 0 | 0 | 0 | 0 | 0 |
Defenders
| 2 | DF | (Italy) ITA | Davide Calabria | 41 | 1 | 26+3 | 1 | 2 | 0 | 5+1 | 0 | 3+1 | 0 |
| 19 | DF | (France) FRA | Théo Hernandez | 46 | 5 | 31+1 | 5 | 2 | 0 | 6 | 0 | 6 | 0 |
| 20 | DF | (France) FRA | Pierre Kalulu | 11 | 0 | 4+5 | 0 | 0 | 0 | 1 | 0 | 0+1 | 0 |
| 23 | DF | (England) ENG | Fikayo Tomori | 35 | 4 | 24+2 | 4 | 0 | 0 | 6 | 0 | 2+1 | 0 |
| 24 | DF | (Denmark) DEN | Simon Kjær | 25 | 0 | 14+6 | 0 | 0+1 | 0 | 0+1 | 0 | 3 | 0 |
| 28 | DF | (Germany) GER | Malick Thiaw | 30 | 0 | 19+2 | 0 | 0 | 0 | 5 | 0 | 1+3 | 0 |
| 30 | DF | (Italy) ITA | Mattia Caldara | 1 | 0 | 0+1 | 0 | 0 | 0 | 0 | 0 | 0 | 0 |
| 38 | DF | (Italy) ITA | Filippo Terracciano | 6 | 0 | 1+2 | 0 | 0+1 | 0 | 0 | 0 | 0+2 | 0 |
| 42 | DF | (Italy) ITA | Alessandro Florenzi | 40 | 1 | 19+12 | 1 | 0+1 | 0 | 1+3 | 0 | 3+1 | 0 |
| 46 | DF | (Italy) ITA | Matteo Gabbia | 25 | 3 | 14+4 | 2 | 1 | 0 | 0 | 0 | 6 | 1 |
| 74 | DF | (Spain) ESP | Álex Jiménez | 5 | 0 | 0+3 | 0 | 2 | 0 | 0 | 0 | 0 | 0 |
| 82 | DF | (Serbia) SRB | Jan-Carlo Simić | 6 | 1 | 0+4 | 1 | 1+1 | 0 | 0 | 0 | 0 | 0 |
| 95 | DF | (Italy) ITA | Davide Bartesaghi | 8 | 0 | 0+6 | 0 | 0+1 | 0 | 0+1 | 0 | 0 | 0 |
Midfielders
| 4 | MF | (Algeria) ALG | Ismaël Bennacer | 25 | 2 | 13+7 | 2 | 0 | 0 | 0 | 0 | 3+2 | 0 |
| 7 | MF | (France) FRA | Yacine Adli | 33 | 1 | 17+7 | 1 | 1+1 | 0 | 1+2 | 0 | 2+2 | 0 |
| 8 | MF | (England) ENG | Ruben Loftus-Cheek | 40 | 10 | 26+3 | 6 | 1 | 0 | 4 | 0 | 5+1 | 4 |
| 11 | MF | (United States) USA | Christian Pulisic | 50 | 15 | 32+4 | 12 | 1+1 | 0 | 5+1 | 1 | 6 | 2 |
| 14 | MF | (Netherlands) NED | Tijjani Reijnders | 50 | 4 | 33+3 | 3 | 2 | 0 | 5+1 | 0 | 4+2 | 1 |
| 32 | MF | (Italy) ITA | Tommaso Pobega | 15 | 0 | 3+8 | 0 | 0 | 0 | 2+2 | 0 | 0 | 0 |
| 80 | MF | (United States) USA | Yunus Musah | 40 | 0 | 13+17 | 0 | 1 | 0 | 4+1 | 0 | 4 | 0 |
| 85 | MF | (Italy) ITA | Kevin Zeroli | 4 | 0 | 0+3 | 0 | 0+1 | 0 | 0 | 0 | 0 | 0 |
Forwards
| 9 | FW | (France) FRA | Olivier Giroud | 47 | 17 | 28+7 | 15 | 0+1 | 0 | 6 | 1 | 5 | 1 |
| 10 | FW | (Portugal) POR | Rafael Leão | 47 | 15 | 29+5 | 9 | 1+1 | 2 | 5 | 1 | 6 | 3 |
| 15 | FW | (Serbia) SRB | Luka Jović | 30 | 9 | 8+15 | 6 | 2 | 2 | 0+2 | 0 | 1+2 | 1 |
| 17 | FW | (Switzerland) SUI | Noah Okafor | 36 | 6 | 6+22 | 6 | 0 | 0 | 0+3 | 0 | 0+5 | 0 |
| 21 | FW | (Nigeria) NGR | Samuel Chukwueze | 33 | 3 | 12+12 | 1 | 1 | 0 | 2+2 | 2 | 0+4 | 0 |
| 73 | FW | (Italy) ITA | Francesco Camarda | 2 | 0 | 0+2 | 0 | 0 | 0 | 0 | 0 | 0 | 0 |
Players transferred out during the season
| 18 | FW | (Argentina) ARG | Luka Romero | 4 | 0 | 0+3 | 0 | 1 | 0 | 0 | 0 | 0 | 0 |
| 29 | FW | (Italy) ITA | Lorenzo Colombo | 0 | 0 | 0 | 0 | 0 | 0 | 0 | 0 | 0 | 0 |
| 31 | DF | (Argentina) ARG | Marco Pellegrino | 1 | 0 | 0+1 | 0 | 0 | 0 | 0 | 0 | 0 | 0 |
| 33 | MF | (Bosnia and Herzegovina) BIH | Rade Krunić | 14 | 0 | 8+2 | 0 | 0 | 0 | 2+2 | 0 | 0 | 0 |
| 70 | FW | (Ivory Coast) CIV | Chaka Traorè | 4 | 2 | 0+2 | 1 | 1 | 1 | 0+1 | 0 | 0 | 0 |

Source: Competitions

=== Goalscorers ===
Players in Italics left the team during the season

| Rank | No. | Pos. | Nat. | Player | Serie A | Coppa Italia | Champions League | Europa League | Total |
|---|---|---|---|---|---|---|---|---|---|
| 1 | 9 | FW | (France) | Olivier Giroud | 15 | 0 | 1 | 1 | 17 |
| 2 | 11 | MF | (United States) | Christian Pulisic | 12 | 0 | 1 | 2 | 15 |
| 2 | 10 | FW | (Portugal) | Rafael Leão | 9 | 2 | 1 | 3 | 15 |
| 4 | 8 | MF | (England) | Ruben Loftus-Cheek | 6 | 0 | 0 | 4 | 10 |
| 5 | 15 | FW | (Serbia) | Luka Jović | 6 | 2 | 0 | 1 | 9 |
| 6 | 17 | FW | (Switzerland) | Noah Okafor | 6 | 0 | 0 | 0 | 6 |
| 7 | 19 | DF | (France) | Théo Hernandez | 5 | 0 | 0 | 0 | 5 |
| 8 | 23 | DF | (England) | Fikayo Tomori | 4 | 0 | 0 | 0 | 4 |
| 8 | 14 | MF | (Netherlands) | Tijjani Reijnders | 3 | 0 | 0 | 1 | 4 |
| 10 | 21 | FW | (Nigeria) | Samuel Chukwueze | 1 | 0 | 2 | 0 | 3 |
| 10 | 46 | DF | (Italy) | Matteo Gabbia | 2 | 0 | 0 | 1 | 3 |
| 12 | 70 | FW | (Ivory Coast) | Chaka Traorè | 1 | 1 | 0 | 0 | 2 |
| 12 | 4 | MF | (Algeria) | Ismaël Bennacer | 2 | 0 | 0 | 0 | 2 |
| 14 | 7 | MF | (France) | Yacine Adli | 1 | 0 | 0 | 0 | 1 |
| 14 | 82 | DF | (Serbia) | Jan-Carlo Simić | 1 | 0 | 0 | 0 | 1 |
| 14 | 42 | DF | (Italy) | Alessandro Florenzi | 1 | 0 | 0 | 0 | 1 |
| 14 | 2 | DF | (Italy) | Davide Calabria | 1 | 0 | 0 | 0 | 1 |
| Own goals | | | | | 0 | 0 | 0 | 0 | 0 |
| Totals | | | | | 76 | 5 | 5 | 13 | 99 |

=== Assists ===
| Rank | No. | Pos. | Nat. | Player | Serie A | Coppa Italia | Champions League | Europa League | Total |
|---|---|---|---|---|---|---|---|---|---|
| 1 | 10 | FW | (Portugal) | Rafael Leão | 9 | 0 | 0 | 4 | 13 |
| 2 | 19 | DF | (France) | Théo Hernandez | 5 | 3 | 1 | 3 | 12 |
| 3 | 9 | FW | (France) | Olivier Giroud | 9 | 0 | 1 | 0 | 10 |
| 3 | 11 | MF | (United States) | Christian Pulisic | 8 | 1 | 0 | 1 | 10 |
| 5 | 42 | DF | (Italy) | Alessandro Florenzi | 4 | 0 | 1 | 3 | 8 |
| 6 | 2 | DF | (Italy) | Davide Calabria | 3 | 0 | 1 | 0 | 4 |
| 7 | 14 | MF | (Netherlands) | Tijjani Reijnders | 3 | 0 | 0 | 0 | 3 |
| 7 | 21 | FW | (Nigeria) | Samuel Chukwueze | 3 | 0 | 0 | 0 | 3 |
| 9 | 17 | FW | (Switzerland) | Noah Okafor | 2 | 0 | 1 | 0 | 3 |
| 9 | 7 | MF | (France) | Yacine Adli | 2 | 0 | 0 | 0 | 2 |
| 9 | 80 | MF | (United States) | Yunus Musah | 2 | 0 | 0 | 0 | 2 |
| 12 | 8 | MF | (England) | Ruben Loftus-Cheek | 1 | 0 | 0 | 0 | 1 |
| 12 | 16 | GK | (France) | Mike Maignan | 1 | 0 | 0 | 0 | 1 |
| 12 | 15 | FW | (Serbia) | Luka Jović | 1 | 0 | 0 | 0 | 1 |
| 12 | 4 | MF | (Algeria) | Ismaël Bennacer | 2 | 0 | 0 | 0 | 2 |
| 12 | 24 | DF | (Denmark) | Simon Kjaer | 1 | 0 | 0 | 0 | 1 |
| 12 | 28 | DF | (Germany) | Malick Thiaw | 1 | 0 | 0 | 0 | 1 |
| 12 | 46 | DF | (Italy) | Matteo Gabbia | 1 | 0 | 0 | 0 | 1 |
| Totals | | | | | 58 | 4 | 5 | 11 | 78 |

=== Clean sheets ===
| Rank | No. | Pos. | Nat. | Player | Serie A | Coppa Italia | Champions League | Europa League | Total |
|---|---|---|---|---|---|---|---|---|---|
| 1 | 16 | GK | (France) | Mike Maignan | 10 | 0 | 1 | 1 | 12 |
| 2 | N.A. | GK | N.A. | Shared | 1 | 0 | 1 | 0 | 2 |
| 2 | 57 | GK | (Italy) | Marco Sportiello | 2 | 0 | 0 | 0 | 2 |
| Totals | | | | | 13 | 0 | 2 | 1 | 16 |

=== Disciplinary record ===
Players in Italics left the team during the season

| No. | Pos. | Nat. | Player | Serie A | | | Coppa Italia | | | Champions League | | | Europa League | | | Total | | |
| No. | Pos. | Nat. | Player | Yellow card | (yellow card) (yellow-red card) | Red card | Yellow card | (yellow card) (yellow-red card) | Red card | Yellow card | (yellow card) (yellow-red card) | Red card | Yellow card | (yellow card) (yellow-red card) | Red card | Yellow card | (yellow card) (yellow-red card) | Red card |
| 19 | DF | (France) | Théo Hernandez | 10 | | 1 | 1 | | | | | | 1 | | | 12 | | 1 |
| 33 | MF | (Bosnia and Herzegovina) | Rade Krunić | 3 | | | | | | 2 | | | | | | 5 | | |
| 28 | DF | (Germany) | Malick Thiaw | 5 | | 1 | | | | 1 | | | | | | 6 | | 1 |
| 17 | FW | (Switzerland) | Noah Okafor | 1 | | | | | | | | | | | | 1 | | |
| 8 | MF | (England) | Ruben Loftus-Cheek | 5 | | | | | | | | | 1 | | | 6 | | |
| 23 | DF | (England) | Fikayo Tomori | 6 | 1 | | | | | 1 | | | 2 | | | 9 | 1 | |
| 80 | MF | (United States) | Yunus Musah | 5 | | | | | | 4 | | | | | | 9 | | |
| 11 | MF | (United States) | Christian Pulisic | 2 | | | | | | | | | 1 | | | 3 | | |
| 42 | DF | (Italy) | Alessandro Florenzi | 5 | | | | | | 1 | | | 1 | | | 7 | | |
| 9 | FW | (France) | Olivier Giroud | 1 | | 1 | | | | 1 | | | | | | 2 | | 1 |
| 2 | DF | (Italy) | Davide Calabria | 2 | 1 | 1 | | | | 1 | | | 2 | | | 5 | 1 | 1 |
| 16 | GK | (France) | Mike Maignan | 1 | | 1 | | | | 1 | | | 1 | | | 3 | | 1 |
| 10 | FW | (Portugal) | Rafael Leão | 5 | | | 1 | | | 1 | | | 1 | | | 8 | | |
| 14 | MF | (Netherlands) | Tijjani Reijnders | 8 | | | | | | 1 | | | | | | 9 | | |
| 7 | MF | (France) | Yacine Adli | 3 | | | | | | | | | 2 | | | 5 | | |
| 20 | DF | (France) | Pierre Kalulu | | | | | | | 1 | | | | | | 1 | | |
| 7 | MF | (Argentina) | Luka Romero | 1 | | | | | | | | | | | | 1 | | |
| 15 | FW | (Serbia) | Luka Jović | 2 | | 1 | | | | 1 | | | 1 | | | 4 | | 1 |
| 4 | DF | (Algeria) | Ismaël Bennacer | 2 | | | | | | | | | | | | 2 | | |
| 74 | DF | (Spain) | Álex Jiménez | 1 | | | | | | | | | | | | 1 | | |
| 83 | GK | (Italy) | Antonio Mirante | | | | | | 1 | | | | | | | | | 1 |
| 46 | DF | (Italy) | Matteo Gabbia | 5 | | | | | | | | | 2 | | | 7 | | |
| 24 | DF | (Denmark) | Simon Kjær | 1 | | | | | | | | | 1 | | | 2 | | |
| 38 | DF | (Italy) | Filippo Terracciano | 1 | | | | | | | | | | | | 1 | | |
| 21 | FW | (Nigeria) | Samuel Chukwueze | 1 | | | | | | | | | | | | 1 | | |
| Totals | | | | 76 | 2 | 6 | 2 | 0 | 1 | 16 | 0 | 0 | 16 | 0 | 0 | 110 | 2 | 7 |
