= Harry Lowe (footballer, born August 1886) =

English footballer (1886–1966)

Personal information
- Full name: Horace Lowe
- Date of birth: 10 August 1886
- Place of birth: Northwich, England
- Date of death: 1966 (aged 79–80)
- Height: 5 ft 9 in (1.75 m)
- Position: Centre half

Senior career*
Years	Team	Apps	(Gls)
- Northwich Victoria
1913–1914	Brighton & Hove Albion	2	(1)
1914–1926	Tottenham Hotspur	65	(0)
1927	Fulham	3	(0)
- Beckenham Town
1934–1935	Real Sociedad	1	(0)

Managerial career
- 1930–1935: Real Sociedad
- 1935: Espanyol
- * Club domestic league appearances and goals

Horace Lowe (10 August 1886 – 1966), commonly known as Harry Lowe, was an English footballer who played for Northwich Victoria, Brighton & Hove Albion, Tottenham Hotspur, Fulham and Beckenham. He is best-known for being the oldest player in the history of La Liga, which he achieved in 1935, at the age of 48.

== Playing career ==
Lowe began his career at Northwich Victoria before joining Brighton & Hove Albion. In 1914 the centre half signed for Tottenham Hotspur. He played a total of 72 matches in all competitions between 1914 and 1926 for the Spurs. He later played for Fulham and finally Beckenham Town.

== Coaching career ==
As a coach, Lowe managed the Spanish side Real Sociedad between 1930 and 1935, and Espanyol in 1935. Lowe arrived in San Sebastián at the end of 1930 to coach Real Sociedad, replacing coach Benito Díaz, who had had to emigrate to France; in the summer of 1931, when the Second Spanish Republic was established, this club was forced to change its name to Donostia Club de Futbol. He brought to Sociedad the most advanced English tactics, and as a result, they finished in third place in the 1930–31 La Liga.

On 4 February 1934, Lowe decided to field the 15-year-old Pedro Irastorza in a La Liga match against FC Barcelona at the Camp de Les Corts, and while Sociedad lost 4–0, Irastorza went down in history as the first-ever under 16 player to feature in the Spanish top-flight.

On 24 March 1935, Sociedad, who was in penultimate place in the standings, traveled to Valencia for its away match against Valencia CF at the Mestalla Stadium, but they did not bring any substitutes to the away game for financial reasons, because in order to reduce expenses, it was common at the time for modest clubs to bring only the eleven players who were going to play. During that trip, however, one of his 11 players got sick and fell ill just before the kick-off, so Lowe had to decide whether to play with 10 at Mestalla or put on his own boots, and he decided to take responsibility.

Lowe thus made his competitive debut in Spanish football that day, which was also the last match that he ever played, and in doing so at the age of 48 years and 226 days, he became by far the oldest player to play a match in the Spanish top division, a record that he still holds by a large margin, since the next closest are Joaquín and Diego López in 2023, and Ricardo in 2013, aged 41. Notably, he made an assist for the only goal of the Basque side, which lost 7–1. Furthermore, the 48-year-old Lowe played alongside the 16-year-old Pedro Irastorza; the age difference between them was 31 years and 255 days, which remains the biggest age difference between partners in La Liga's history. Sociedad went on to experience its first-ever relegation in history at the end of that season, after which Lowe left.

He then became coach of RCD Espanyol, where he arrived accompanied by two English footballers, Cipson and Green. Lowe had not yet finished the season when he left for England for private matters, being replaced by Patricio Caicedo.
