= Lapo Nava =

Italian footballer

Personal information
- Full name: Lapo Francesco Maria Nava
- Date of birth: 22 January 2004 (age 22)
- Place of birth: Milan, Italy
- Height: 1.97 m (6 ft 6 in)
- Position: Goalkeeper

Team information
- Current team: Alcione (on loan from Cremonese)
- Number: 69

Youth career
- –2024: AC Milan

Senior career*
| Years | Team | Apps | (Gls) |
| 2022–2025 | AC Milan | 1 | (0) |
| 2024–2025 | Milan Futuro (res.) | 18 | (0) |
| 2025– | Cremonese | 0 | (0) |
| 2026– | → Alcione (loan) | 0 | (0) |
- * Club domestic league appearances and goals as of 15:38, 10 July 2026 (UTC)

Lapo Francesco Maria Nava (born 22 January 2004) is an Italian professional footballer who plays as a goalkeeper for Serie C Group A club Alcione, on loan from Cremonese.

== Career ==
=== Youth career ===
Nava came through the AC Milan Youth Sector. In the 2021–22 season, he was the first choice goalkeeper for the Milan under-18 side and in the 2022–23 season, he was elevated to the Primavera team, where he also became the first choice goalkeeper. He played a key role in the AC Milan U19 side making the semi-finals of the 2022–23 UEFA Youth League, playing in every game and keeping three clean sheets during the tournament. On 6 January 2022, 17-year-old Nava was named as substitute in the match day squad for AC Milan first team against Roma, after second choice goalkeeper Ciprian Tătărușanu caught COVID-19 and third-choice stopper Alessandro Plizzari was ruled out through injury. He was also on the bench for AC Milan's match three days later against Venezia, but did not make an appearance in either game.

=== AC Milan ===
During the 2022–23 season, Nava appeared on the bench seven times for AC Milan's first team, including four UEFA Champions League games.

At the beginning of the 2023–24 season, Nava was invited to join the first team for pre-season training. He made an appearance off the bench during a pre-season match against Novara.

On 19 August 2023, Nava was officially named as a member of the first team squad.

He was called-up for the 1–0 Serie A home loss match against Juventus on 22 October 2023, due to the absences of both Mike Maignan and Marco Sportiello for the date, Nava along with the reserve squad goalkeeper Andrea Bartoccioni featured on the bench as back-up options for the starting veteran Antonio Mirante, but neither played.

On 25 May 2024, Nava made his AC Milan and competitive senior football debut, coming on as a substitute for Antonio Mirante at the 88th minute and conceding a goal the very next minute in a 3–3 home 2023–24 Serie A closing game against Salernitana.

He made his debut for the newly created reserve team Milan Futuro on 10 August 2024, starting and saving a penalty at the 50th minute of a 3–0 away win Coppa Italia Serie C first round match against Lecco.

=== Cremonese ===
On 17 July 2025, Nava joined fellow Serie A club Cremonese on a permanent transfer, signing a contract until 2028.

==== Loan to Alcione ====
On 8 July 2026, Cremonese announced that Nava would be playing in Serie C once again, having joined Milan-based team Alcione on loan.

== Personal life ==
Nava is the son of former professional footballer Stefano Nava, who also played for AC Milan and later coached in the club's youth sector.

== Career statistics ==
As of match played 17 May 2025

Appearances and goals by club, season and competition
| Club | Season | League | | | National cup (Note: Includes Coppa Italia Serie C) | | Europe | | Other | | Total | |
| Club | Season | Division | Apps | Goals | Apps | Goals | Apps | Goals | Apps | Goals | Apps | Goals |
|---|---|---|---|---|---|---|---|---|---|---|---|---|
| AC Milan | 2021–22 | Serie A | 0 | 0 | 0 | 0 | — | | — | | 1 | 0 |
| AC Milan | 2022–23 | Serie A | 0 | 0 | 0 | 0 | 0 | 0 | 0 | 0 | 0 | 0 |
| AC Milan | 2023–24 | Serie A | 1 | 0 | 0 | 0 | 0 | 0 | — | | 1 | 0 |
| AC Milan | 2024–25 | Serie A | 0 | 0 | 0 | 0 | 0 | 0 | 0 | 0 | 0 | 0 |
| AC Milan | Total | | 1 | 0 | 0 | 0 | 0 | 0 | 0 | 0 | 1 | 0 |
| Milan Futuro | 2024–25 | Serie C | 18 | 0 | 4 | 0 | — | | 2 (Note: Appearances in Serie C play-out) | 0 | 24 | 0 |
| Cremonese | 2025–26 | Serie A | 0 | 0 | 0 | 0 | — | | — | | 0 | 0 |
| Alcione Milano | 2026–27 | Serie C | 0 | 0 | 0 | 0 | — | | — | | 0 | 0 |
| Career total | | | 19 | 0 | 4 | 0 | 0 | 0 | 2 | 0 | 25 | 0 |
