= Chaka Traorè =

Ivorian footballer

Personal information
- Date of birth: 23 December 2004 (age 21)
- Place of birth: Attécoubé, Ivory Coast
- Height: 1.75 m (5 ft 9 in)
- Positions: Winger; attacking midfielder

Team information
- Current team: Partizan
- Number: 7

Youth career
- 2016–2017: U.S. Audace
- 2017–2021: Parma
- 2021–2023: AC Milan

Senior career*
Years	Team	Apps	(Gls)
2021	Parma	3	(0)
2023–2026	AC Milan	2	(1)
2024	→ Palermo (loan)	10	(0)
2024–2026	Milan Futuro (res.)	45	(11)
2026–	Partizan	6	(1)

International career^{‡}
2023–	Ivory Coast U23	1	(0)
- * Club domestic league appearances and goals as of 22:45, 31 August 2026 (UTC) ‡ National team caps and goals as of 23:45, 24 March 2023 (UTC)

Chaka Traorè (born 23 December 2004) is an Ivorian professional footballer who plays as a winger and attacking midfielder for Serbian SuperLiga club Partizan.

== Club career ==
=== Parma ===
Traorè made his professional debut with Parma in a 2–1 Coppa Italia loss to Lazio on 21 January 2021. On 10 April 2021 he made his Serie A debut in a 3–1 loss against AC Milan; he also became the first 2004-born player to play in Serie A.

=== AC Milan ===
On 30 August 2021, Traorè moved to Serie A club AC Milan, immediately joining the youth sector roster. In July 2023, he extended his contract with the club until June 2028 and was promoted to the senior team. He made his senior debut for AC Milan on 28 November 2023 in a 3–1 Champions League loss to Borussia Dortmund, coming on as a substitute in the 77th minute. Traorè made his first league appearance for AC Milan four days later in a 3–1 win against Frosinone. He started and scored his first senior goal for AC Milan on 2 January 2024 in Coppa Italia, securing a 4–1 win over Cagliari. On 7 January, Traorè scored his first Serie A goal in a match against Empoli, contributing to a 3–0 win.

==== Loan to Palermo ====
On 1 February 2024, he joined Serie B club Palermo on loan for the rest of the season, with an option to make the move permanent.

==== Return to AC Milan and Milan Futuro ====
After the 2023–24 season concluded, Traorè returned to AC Milan and joined their newly created reserve team Milan Futuro, set to compete in the Serie C Group B. He made his debut with Milan Futuro on 17 August 2024, starting for a 2–1 away win Coppa Italia Serie C round of 16 match against Novara.

He scored his first goal with Milan Futuro on 26 September 2024, coming on as a substitute for Mattia Liberali at the 73rd minute, and scoring the second goal with a header at the 85th minute, for a 2–1 home win Serie C Group B match against SPAL.

=== Partizan ===
On 18 June 2026, Traorè moved to Serbian SuperLiga and signed with Partizan, ahead of the 2026–27 season.

== International career ==
Traorè was called up to the Ivory Coast U23s in March 2023.

== Personal life ==
Born in Ivory Coast, he moved to Italy where he grew up.

In 2015 he took a small boat from Africa's North Coast with the aim to reach Italy. Once in Italy, Traorè and his agent, who was later found guilty of assisting illegal immigration, were headed to Parma. Traorè was traveling under a false name and was listed as Cissè in his passport. In Italy, the then 11-year-old took on various part-time jobs to survive before he finally was discovered by U.S. Audace—a prominent academy club in the provincial capital.

== Career statistics ==
=== Club ===
As of match played 23 August 2026

Appearances and goals by club, season and competition
Club	Season	League			National cup (Note: Includes Coppa Italia, Coppa Italia Serie C)		Europe		Other		Total	
Club	Season	Division	Apps	Goals	Apps	Goals	Apps	Goals	Apps	Goals	Apps	Goals
Parma	2020–21	Serie A	3	0	1	0	—		0	0	4	0
Parma	Total		3	0	1	0	—		0	0	4	0
AC Milan	2023–24	Serie A	2	1	1	1	1 (Note: Appearance in UEFA Champions League)	0	0	0	4	2
AC Milan	2024–25	Serie A	0	0	0	0	0	0	0	0	0	0
AC Milan	Total		2	1	1	1	0	0	0	0	4	2
Palermo (loan)	2023–24	Serie B	10	0	—		—		2 (Note: Appearances in 2024 Serie B promotion play-offs)	0	12	0
Palermo (loan)	Total		10	0	—		—		2	0	12	0
Milan Futuro	2024–25	Serie C	20	2	3	0	—		2 (Note: Appearances in Serie C play-out)	0	25	2
Milan Futuro	2025–26	Serie D	25	9	0	0	—		0	0	25	9
Milan Futuro	Total		45	11	3	0	—		2	0	50	11
Partizan	2026–27	Serbian SuperLiga	5	1	0	0	4 (Note: Appearances in UEFA Conference League)	2	0	0	9	3
Partizan	Total		5	1	0	0	4	2	0	0	9	3
Career total			65	13	5	1	5	2	4	0	79	16

== Honours ==
AC Milan

- Supercoppa Italiana: 2024
