= Sansón (footballer) =

Spanish footballer

Personal information
- Full name: Francisco Bao Rodríguez
- Date of birth: 20 April 1924
- Place of birth: Vigo, Spain
- Date of death: 13 February 2012 (aged 87)
- Place of death: Vigo, Spain
- Height: 1.85 m (6 ft 1 in)
- Position: Defender

Youth career
- Vigués

Senior career*
Years	Team	Apps	(Gls)
1939–1941	Celta	6	(0)
1941–1943	Cultural Leonesa	14	(0)
1943–1945	Sporting Gijón	22	(8)
1945–1950	Oviedo	115	(1)
1950–1955	Celta	40	(0)
1955–1956	Xerez	3	(0)
Total		200	(9)
- * Club domestic league appearances and goals

Francisco Bao Rodríguez (20 April 1924 – 13 February 2012), known as Sansón, was a Spanish footballer who played as a defender.

He was the youngest ever player to take part in a La Liga game for 80 years, when he appeared for Celta in 1939.

== Career ==
Born in Vigo, Province of Pontevedra, Galicia, Sansón joined local RC Celta de Vigo in 1939. On 31 December that year, aged 15 years and 255 days, he made his La Liga debut in a 4–1 away win against Sevilla FC, one of just six league appearances he would make for the club over two seasons, after which he was deemed surplus to requirements due to his age.

In 1943, after two years with Cultural y Deportiva Leonesa, Sansón returned to the top division with Sporting de Gijón, although he was again only a reserve at that level. Subsequently, he developed into an important player with Asturias neighbours Real Oviedo – also in the latter tier – playing an average of 23 matches during his stint, which included two top-five finishes.

Sansón returned to Celta for the 1950–51 season, where he was utilised as a defender, midfielder and forward, but he was again almost exclusively a backup (20 games in his third year, a total of only 20 in the other four). After rejecting a new five-year contract for 500.000 pesetas, he retired in 1956 after a spell with Xerez CD, with top-flight totals of 167 matches and one goal, scored for Oviedo on 29 January 1950 in a 2–0 home victory over Real Madrid.

Sansón's record was broken on 24 June 2020, when RCD Mallorca's Luka Romero took the field against Real Madrid. As of April 2025, he was the fourth-youngest player to make an appearance in the top five European leagues, only behind Kalman Gerencseri, Ethan Nwaneri and Romero.

== Death ==
On 13 February 2012, Sansón died in his hometown at the age of 87.
