= Kalman Gerencseri =

French footballer (1945–2023)

Personal information
- Date of birth: 9 January 1945
- Place of birth: Wingles, France
- Date of death: 23 August 2023 (aged 78)
- Height: 1.72 m (5 ft 8 in)
- Position: Midfielder

Senior career*
Years	Team	Apps	(Gls)
1960–1962	Lens B		
1960–1969	Lens	134	(2)
1969–1978	Auxerre		
- * Club domestic league appearances and goals

Kalman Gerencseri (9 January 1945 – 23 August 2023) was a French footballer who played as midfielder. He is the youngest player to play in the French first division, having made his debut on 12 August 1960 at the age of 15 years, 7 months and 12 days.

== Early and personal life ==
Gerencseri was born in Wingles, France, to a family of Hungarian miners who had emigrated before the First World War. While playing in France, he was often known by just "Kalman", as locals found his second name too difficult to pronounce.

== Club career ==
Gerencseri was called up to the first team of professional club Lens by manager Jules Bigot ahead of a Division 1 fixture against AS Monaco on 20 August 1960, which ended in a 1–0 loss. In doing so at the age of 15 years and 222 days, he became the youngest player in the history of Ligue 1, a record which still stands, and will forever stand, as the French Football Federation have imposed a minimum age limit of sixteen. This was also the age record for the Top 5 European leagues for over 60 years, until it was broken by Luka Romero in 2020, aged 15 years and 219 days.

In a nine-year career with Lens, he made a total of 134 league appearances, scoring twice, and played in a further eighteen games in additional competitions. He notably won the 1965 edition of the Coupe Charles Drago, and featured in a 5–1 friendly loss to the Hungary during their preparation for the 1966 FIFA World Cup. Following his departure from Lens in 1969, he spent seven years with Auxerre in the second and third divisions of French football, before retiring in 1978.

== Death ==
Gerencseri died on 23 August 2023, at the age of 78.
